= Circus (disambiguation) =

A circus is a traveling company of performers that may include acrobats, clowns, trained animals, and other novelty acts.

Circus or The Circus may also refer to:

== Art and architecture ==
- Roman circus, an open-air public space in the Roman Empire
- The Circus, Bath, a structure in Bath, Somerset, England
- The Circus (Seurat), an 1891 painting by Georges Seurat

== Literature ==
- Circus (magazine), an American rock music magazine 1966–2006
- Circus (novel), a 1975 novel by Alistair MacLean

== Film and television ==
=== Film ===
- The Circus (1928 film), an American film directed by and starring Charlie Chaplin
- Circus (1932 film), a Flip the Frog cartoon
- Circus (1936 film), a Soviet comedy musical directed by Grigori Aleksandrov
- Circus (1939 film), a Swedish-Danish drama film directed by George Schnéevoigt
- The Circus (1943 film), a Mexican comedy starring Cantinflas
- Circus (2000 film), a British/American neo-noir crime film directed by Rob Walker
- Circus (2009 film), an Indian Kannada-language film directed by Dayal Padmanabhan

=== Television ===
- Circus (Canadian TV series), a 1978–1985 Canadian variety show
- Circus (Indian TV series), a 1989–1990 Indian drama series
- Circus, a 2010 PBS documentary series on the Big Apple Circus
- The Circus: Inside the Greatest Political Show on Earth, a 2016 documentary series
- "Circus" (Aqua Teen Hunger Force), a 2002 episode
- "Circus" (Bluey), a 2020 episode
- "Circus" (Glenn Martin, DDS), a 2009 episode
- "The Circus" (Helluva Boss), a 2022 episode
- "Circus", an episode of the TV series Pocoyo
- "Circus" (Slow Horses), a 2025 episode

== Music ==
=== Performers ===
- Circus (American band), a 1970–1975 power pop band
- Circus (French band), a pop group formed in 2012
- Circus (rapper) (21st century), American rapper
- Circus, a 1967–1969 British jazz group that included Mel Collins
- Circus, a 1972–1990 Swiss progressive rock band

=== Albums ===
- Circus (Argent album) or the title song, 1975
- Circus (Britney Spears album) or the title song (see below), 2008
  - The Circus Starring Britney Spears, a 2009 concert tour
- Circus (Chiaki Kuriyama album), 2011
- Circus (Eraserheads album), 1994
- Circus (FictionJunction Yuuka album), 2007
- Circus (Lenny Kravitz album) or the title song (see below), 1995
- Circus (EP), by Stray Kids, or the title song (see below), 2022
- Circus, by Flairck, 1981
- Circus, by Mary Black, 1995
- Circus, by Teflon Brothers, 2017
- The Circus (Erasure album) or the title song (see below), 1987
- The Circus (Man with a Mission album), 2026
- The Circus (Take That album) or the title song, 2008
- The Circus (EP), by Mick Jenkins, 2020
- The Circus, by the Venetia Fair, 2009

=== Songs ===
- "Circus" (Britney Spears song), 2008
- "Circus" (Lenny Kravitz song), 1995
- "Circus" (Stray Kids song), 2022
- "Circus", by Brotherhood of Man later reissued on Images, 1977
- "Circus", by Circle from Kollekt, 1998
- "Circus", by Friend & Lover, 1969
- "Circus", by John Cale from Walking on Locusts, 1996
- "Circus", by Kim Taeyeon from Something New, 2018
- "Circus", by John Denver from Rhymes & Reasons, 1969
- "Circus", by MC Mong from Show's Just Begun, 2008
- "Circus", by Moloko from Do You Like My Tight Sweater?, 1995
- "Circus", by Sonny & Cher, 1969
- "Circus", by String Driven Thing, 1972
- "Circus", by Summer Walker from Still Over It, 2021
- "Circus", by Tomoyasu Hotei, 1996
- "Circus", by Uriah Heep from Sweet Freedom, 1973
- "Circus", written by Louis Alter, 1949
- "Circus (What I Am)", by Michael Quatro, 1972
- "The Circus" (song), by Erasure, 1987
- "The Circus", by the Clentele from Music for the Age of Miracles, 2017
- "The Circus", by Toby Fox from Deltarune Chapter 1 OST, 2018

== Other uses ==
- Circus (bird), the largest genus of harriers
- Circus (video game), a Breakout clone released by Exidy in 1977
- Circus offensive, British Royal Air Force bombing operations during World War II
- Secret Intelligence Service (MI6), nicknamed "The Circus", the UK foreign intelligence service
- Circus, a United Kingdom term for a circular road junction

== See also ==
- Cirkus (disambiguation)
- Three Ring Circus (disambiguation)
- Two Ring Circus (disambiguation)
- Circus Circus (disambiguation)
- Circus Maximus (disambiguation)
- Flying circus (disambiguation)
