= Big ring =

Big ring may refer to:

== Places ==
- Big Ring, a ring of galaxies in the constellation Bootes, a very large structure in the universe

=== Paths ===
- a ring road
- Moscow Big Ring Road (A108), a Russian federal highway
- Moscow Big Ring Railway, see Rail transport in Russia
- Big Ring Road (Budapest), Hungary; a boulevard around central Pest, Budapest, starting and ending at bridges across the Danube River to Buda, Budapest
- Big Ring, a track configuration for the race circuit Sokol International Racetrack, Almaty, Kazakhstan

=== Fictional ===
- Big Ring, a fictional space station in Mobile Suit Gundam AGE; see List of Mobile Suit Gundam AGE episodes

== Arts, entertainment, media ==
- Big Ring Records, the record label created by the band 'The Steel Wheels' for their own record releases
- Big Ring (陳秋月), an award-winning Taiwanese radio program at the 1983 18th Golden Bell Awards
- The big ring, or center ring, at a circus

== See also ==
- Great Ring (disambiguation)
- Ring (disambiguation)
- Big (disambiguation)
