= One ring (disambiguation) =

The One Ring is a central plot element in J. R. R. Tolkien's The Lord of the Rings.

One ring may also refer to:

- the missed call telephone scam, a phone fraud
- TheOneRing.net, a fandom website for Middle-Earth related topics
- The One Ring Roleplaying Game, a tabletop role-playing game
- The One Ring (Legends), a module for the play-by-mail game

== See also ==
- Ring 1 (disambiguation)
- Ring (disambiguation)
- The Ring (disambiguation)
- Power ring (disambiguation)
- TOR (disambiguation)
- Monocyclic aromatic hydrocarbon, 1-ringed aromatic hydrocarbons
- Heterocyclic compounds, 1-ring
