= Rings 1 and 2 =

Ring 1 or Ring 2 may refer to:

- Ring 1 (disambiguation)
- Ring 2 (disambiguation)

== See also ==
- Ring (disambiguation)
