= Grignard =

Grignard is a surname of French origin. People with that name include:

- Ferre Grignard (1939–82), Belgian skiffle-singer
  - Ferre Grignard (1972 album)
- Georges Grignard (1905–77), French racing driver
- Pierre Grignard (active 1918–20), Belgian local politician
- Victor Grignard (1871–1935), Nobel Prize-winning French organic chemist

== See also ==
- 10305 Grignard, a main-belt asteroid named after Ferre Grignard
- Grignard (crater), a lunar impact crater named after Victor Grignard
- Grignard reaction, an organic chemical reaction developed by Victor Grignard, involving the use of a Grignard reagent
- Grignard reagent, an organomagnesium compound developed by Victor Grignard.
