= Two rings =

Two rings, or variations, may refer to:

- 2-ring, in mathematics
- "Two Rings", a 2011 song by Ice Choir from the 2012 album Afar
- a type of ring binder
- Bicyclic molecule, two-ringed molecule
  - Heterocyclic compounds, 2-ring

== See also ==
- Two Ring Circus (disambiguation)
- Ring Ring (disambiguation)
- Ring 2 (disambiguation)
- Ring (disambiguation)
- 2nd Ring Road, in Beijing
