= Three Rings (disambiguation) =

The Three Rings are fictional artifacts in Tolkien's legendarium.

Three Rings, or variations, may also refer to:

== Arts and entertainment ==
- Three-ring circus or three-ring
- Three Rings Design, a video game developer
- Three Ringz, a 2008 album by T-Pain
- "Three Rings" (song), by Grizzly Bear, 2017

== Animals ==
- Three Rings (horse), winner of the 1950 Edgemere Handicap
- Ypthima butterflies
  - Ypthima asterope, the common three-ring
  - Ypthima watsoni, the looped three-ring
  - Ypthima yatta, the Yatta three-ring

== Other uses ==
- 3-ring release system, a parachute component
- Three-ring binder, a type of paper filing container
- Tricyclic chemical compounds (3-ringed chemical compounds)
  - Heterocyclic compounds, 3-ring

== See also ==
- Borromean rings, three simple closed curves in three-dimensional space
- Ring Ring Ring (disambiguation)
- Ring 3 (disambiguation)
- Three Ring Circus (disambiguation)
- Third Ring Road (disambiguation)
- Ring (disambiguation)
- Tricycle (disambiguation)
