= Ring Ring =

Ring Ring may refer to:

- Ring Ring (album), a 1973 album by Björn & Benny, Agnetha & Anni-Frid, who would later become ABBA
  - "Ring Ring" (ABBA song), the title song
- "Ring Ring" (Jax Jones song), 2018
- "Ring Ring", a song by Juice Wrld from Death Race for Love, 2019
- "Ring Ring", a song by Mika from Life in Cartoon Motion, 2007
- "Ring Ring", a song by Rick Ross from Rich Forever, 2012
- Ring Ring, a fictional character in the TV series Pucca
- Ring Ring (2019 film), an action thriller film starring Lou Ferrigno
- Ring Ring (2025 film), an Indian Tamil-language drama film
- Ring Ring (political party), a political association founded in Italy by Michele Boldrin and Alberto Forchielli

== See also ==
- "Ring Ring, I've Got to Sing", a 1966 song by Ferre Grignard
- "Ring Ring Ring (Ha Ha Hey)", a 1991 song by De La Soul
- Ringtone
- Two rings (disambiguation)
- Ring 2 (disambiguation)
- Ring (disambiguation)
