= Cirkus =

Cirkus may refer to:

- Cirkus (Stockholm), arena in Stockholm
- CirKus, trip-hop band
- "Cirkus", a 1970 song by King Crimson on the album Lizard
- "Cirkus", a 2013 song by Jelena Rozga on the album Moderna Žena
  - Cirkus: The Young Persons' Guide to King Crimson Live, a King Crimson live album
- Cirkus (1939 film), a Danish-Swedish film
- Cirkus (film), a 2022 Indian comedy film by Rohit Shetty
  - Cirkus (soundtrack), its soundtrack by Devi Sri Prasad, Hiten-Badshah, Lijo George and DJ Chetas

== See also ==
- Circus (disambiguation)
