= Captain Disaster =

Studio album by Ferre Grignard
- Released: 1968
- Genre: Psychedelic
- Label: Barclay
- Producer: Rikki Stein

Ferre Grignard chronology
Ring, Ring, I've Got to Sing (1966)	Captain Disaster (1968)	Fērrē Grignard (1972)

Singles from Captain Disaster
- 1. "Captain Disaster" / "Tell Me Now" Released: 1968; 2. "Yama, Yama, Hey" / "I Won't Have a Dance" Released: May 1969

Captain Disaster is Belgian singer-songwriter Ferre Grignard's second solo album. Released in 1968, it was a dramatic departure from the mainly skiffle-based Ring, Ring, I've Got to Sing.

== Track listing ==
All tracks are written by Ferre Grignard except where stated

Side 1
No.	Title	Writer(s)	Length
1.	"I Won't Have A Dance"		3:52
2.	"Tell Me Now"		3:04
3.	"Yama, Yama, Hey"	F. Grignard, George Smits	2:10
4.	"My Friend"	F. Grignard, H. Hermans	4:46
5.	"Hansie Pansy"		2:40

Side 2
No.	Title	Writer(s)	Length
1.	"Down in the Valley"	(Arranged by F. Grignard)	4:12
2.	"The Pirate Song"	(Arranged by F. Grignard)	3:55
3.	"Pleasure Train"	(Arranged by F. Grignard)	3:00
4.	"Captain Disaster"	F. Grignard, G. Smits	3:03
5.	"The Lost Affair"		1:58

== Release history ==
Year	Country	Label	Cat. No.
1968	France	Barclay	920 117
1968	United States	Vanguard	VSD-79298
1970	Spain	Movieplay	S 21.171
1970	United Kingdom	Major Minor	SMLP 72

== Personnel ==
- Ferre Grignard: Vocals
- Instrumental Group
- George "Toet" Smits: Guitar, Harmonica
- Rikki Stein: Production
- Jean-Claude Petit: Arrangements
- Bernard Estardy: Sound Engineer
- Raoul Vandenboom: Front Liner Photo
- Jules Halfant: Art Direction
- Jean-Pierre Leloir: Photography
