= Ring 0 =

Ring 0 or zero ring or variations, may refer to:

== Arts and entertainment ==
- Ring 0: Birthday, a Japanese horror prequel film
  - The Ring Volume 0: Birthday, a subsequent manga

== Technology ==
- Ring 0 (computer security), the highest privilege level
- Telephone dialling instructions to access a switchboard operator

== Other uses ==
- Zero ring, the trivial ring in mathematics ring theory
- O̊, the letter "O" with a ring diacritical mark

== See also ==
- Birthday (short story collection), a Japanese anthology containing prequels and sequels to Ring
- Ring road (disambiguation)
- Ring (disambiguation)
