= I Warned You! =

I Warned you!

Studio album by Ferre Grignard
- Released: April 1978
- Recorded: Late 1977 – early 1978 at Studio Soundpush in Blaricum
- Genres: R&B, blues rock
- Length: 39:32
- Label: Philips
- Producers: Hugo Spencer & Jan Schuurman

Ferre Grignard chronology
Fērrē Grignard (1972)	I Warned you! (1978)	The Best of Ferre Grignard (1991)

Singles from I warned you!
- 1. "I Warned You" / "All Right" Released: March 1978

I Warned You (stylized as "I warned you!") is the final album by Belgian skiffle musician, Ferre Grignard, released in 1978.

Several tracks have been known to be played more than a decade before recording. "All Right" had been played for a French television broadcast in 1973. "Orphan Blues" had been played live in the late 1960s. A live 1966 recording of "I'm Alabama Bound" appears on the LP Beat & Prosa

"On My Dying Bed" has an incorrect running time of 5:30 on the LP label. There are three extra verses printed on the lyrics sheet, presumably cut out during the mastering of the album. This running time is in fact that of its demo "The First of the Sick Animals", released on Lost Tracks.

The lyric sheet has a vast number of typos on it, this is due to Ferre's style of singing. Either a transcript typed out an interpretation of the lyrics, or Ferre sang them in his loose English and provided the printing press with his lyric sheets. Due to Ferre's cut-up style, however, he improvised much of his vocal output using various lines such as "sailing down" and "sun shine bright".

Although several of the self-penned songs are credited thus, some parts are lifted from other songs following the folk tradition. "The New Sheriff" shares some verses with Woody Guthrie's "Dead or Alive". "All Right" has one bit culled from "Roving Gambler". "Orphan Blues" is almost a copy of "I've Been Treated Wrong".

== Track listing ==
Side A
No.	Title	Writer(s)	Length
1.	"I Warned You"	Ferre Grignard	4:10
2.	"The New Sheriff"	Ferre Grignard	3:40
3.	"All Right"	Ferre Grignard	3:40
4.	"Orphan Blues"	Ferre Grignard	5:13
5.	"Irene Goodnight"	H. Ledbetter	3:19

Side B
No.	Title	Writer(s)	Length
1.	"I'm Alabama Bound"	Trad./arr. Ferre Grignard	3:22
2.	"Have A Whiff On Me"	Trad./arr. Ferre Grignard	1:15
3.	"On My Dying Bed" (original title: "The First of the Sick Animals")	Ferre Grignard	4:38
4.	"Midnight Special"	Trad./arr. Ferre Grignard	4:10
5.	"Smoozy Punky Baby"	Ferre Grignard	6:02

== Personnel ==
Ferre worked with members of the Belgian blues band 5th Ball Gang, during the late 1970s. The members he worked with are seen posing with him on the back cover of the album, in the dining room of the house Ferre was living in at the time, the mansion of fellow Flemish songwriter Peter Benoit.

- Ferre Grignard: vocals & guitar
- Hugo Spencer: bass & vocals
- Trevor Pape: lead guitar
- Luk Kuypers: drums
- William Down: mandolin, violin & banjo
- George "Toet" Smits: harmonica
