= Ring Ring Ring (disambiguation) =

"Ring Ring Ring" is a 2025 song by Tyler, the Creator.

Ring Ring Ring may also refer to:

== Songs ==
- "Ring Ring Ring (Ha Ha Hey)", a 1991 song by De La Soul
- "Ring Ring Ring", a 2001 song by Aaron Soul
- "Ring Ring Ring", a 2009 song by Kurd Maverick
- "Ring Ring Ring", a 1985 Eurovision song by Merethe Trøan
- "Ring Ring Ring", a 2017 song by Mikael Gabriel
- "Ring Ring Ring", a 2006 song by S.H.E. from Forever
- "Ring Ring Ring", a 2019 song by Verivery from Veri-Us
- "Ring, Ring, Ring", a 2003 song by Brian Setzer from Nitro Burnin' Funny Daddy
- "Ring, Ring, Ring", a 1984 song by Joaquin Sabrina from Ruleta Rusa
- "Ring Ring Ring!", a 2007 song from Little Busters!
- "Ring! Ring! Ring!", a 2009 song by Scandal from Best Scandal

== Other uses ==
- "Ring Ring Ring" (chapter 76), a serialized manga chapter of Chainsaw Man

== See also ==
- Three Rings (disambiguation)
- Ring 3 (disambiguation)
- Ring (disambiguation)
