= 18 Shades of Gay =

Temporary public art installation in Montréal, Quebec, Canada

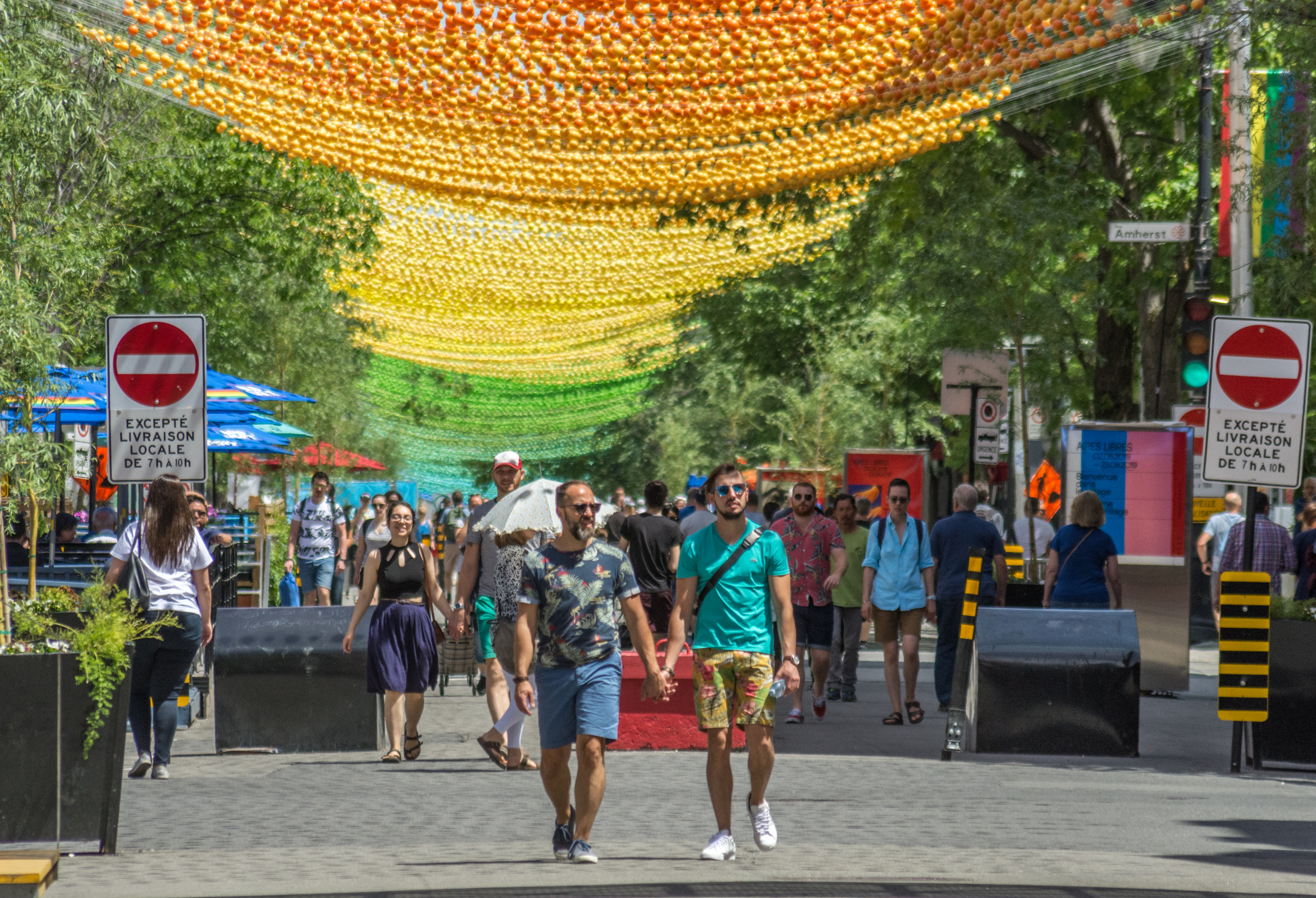
- The art installation in 2019
- Artist: Claude Cormier
- Location: Montreal, Quebec, Canada
- 45.5181°N 73.5564°W

18 Shades of Gay was an art installation by Claude Cormier along Sainte-Catherine Street in Montreal's Gay Village, in Quebec, Canada.

The work was initially installed in 2011 as part of Montreal 375th anniversary celebrations, and consisted of pink plastic balls. In 2017, the pink balls were replaced with multi-coloured balls. The installation was retired in 2019 with Cormier explaining he never intended for them to stay up long. This was due to concerns about the balls degrading from sun and rain exposure.

After the installation was removed, the balls were made available to buy for $100. Buyers would receive 54 of the balls in a single colour and materials to string them up. The majority of the proceeds were put towards the next art installation, with 10 percent going towards three local LGBT organisations.

The installation won the 2020 National Urban Design Award in the Urban Fragments category.
