= Ferre Grignard (1972 album) =

FĒRRĒ GRIGNARD

Studio album by Ferre Grignard
- Released: 1972
- Genre: Rock, skiffle, blues rock
- Label: Les Disques Motors

Ferre Grignard chronology
Captain Disaster (1968)	FĒRRĒ GRIGNARD (1972)	I warned you! (1978)

Singles from FĒRRĒ GRIGNARD
- 1. "Lazy John" / "She's Back" Released: 1972

Férré Grignard (stylized: FĒRRĒ GRIGNARD) is Belgian singer-songwriter Ferre Grignard's third solo album. Released in 1972, it was a significant departure from the psychedelic nature of the last album, Captain Disaster.

== Track list ==
All music is composed by Ferre Grignard except where indicated.

Side 1
No.	Title	Lyrics	Length
1.	"Fog Trouble"	Jozef Hermans
2.	"I've Gotta Cheat Ya Baby"	Hermans
3.	"She's Back"	Hermans
4.	"Cool It Baby"	Michel Overkom

Side 2
No.	Title	Lyrics	Length
1.	"Lazy John"
2.	"Be My Guest Lord"	Overkom
3.	"The Muze"	Hermans
4.	"Chully Chully Mr. Fries"	Hermans

== Personnel ==
- Ferre Grignard: vocals, guitar
- Emilius Fingertips: washboard
- Derroll Adams: banjo
- Gilles Papiri: bass
- François Auger: drums
- George Toet Smits: guitar, harmonica
- Slim Pezin: lead guitar
- Koen de Bruyn: piano
