= Three Ring Circus =

Three Ring Circus, or variations, may refer to

- Three-ring circus, a type of circus
- 3 Ring Circus, a 1954 American comedy film
- "Three Ring Circus", a 1977 song by Barry Biggs
- "Three Ring Circus", a 1974 song by Blue Magic
- "Three Ring Circus", a song by Beady Eye song from the 2011 album Different Gear, Still Speeding
- 3 Ring Circus – Live at the Palace, a 2013 live album recorded in 1995 by Sublime
- Three-Ring Circus: Kobe, Shaq, Phil, and the Crazy Years of the Lakers Dynasty, a 2020 book by Jeff Pearlman

== See also ==
- Two Ring Circus (disambiguation)
- Circus (disambiguation)
