= Wringing =

Wringing may refer to:

- Wringing (gauge blocks), the temporary attachment of gauge blocks to each other
- Wringer, a device that extracts liquid by action of twisting or squeezing (see: mangle (machine))
- Neck wringing (see: strangling)

== See also ==
- Rett syndrome, a genetic postnatal neurological disorder
- Danny Wring, English former professional footballer
- Ringing (disambiguation)
