= Lincoln Alexander Public School =

Lincoln Alexander Public School may refer to:

== Schools named after The Honourable Lincoln Alexander ==
Schools named in honour of Lincoln Alexander, former federal Member of Parliament, former federal cabinet minister, former Lieutenant Governor of Ontario.

Elementary schools

- Lincoln Alexander Public School in Ajax, Ontario, part of the Durham District School Board
- Lincoln Alexander Public School in Hamilton, Ontario, part of the Hamilton-Wentworth District School Board
- Lincoln Alexander Public School in Markham, Ontario part of the York Region District School Board

Other

- Lincoln M. Alexander Secondary School in Mississauga, Ontario, part of the Peel District School Board
