= Ring 5 =

Ring 5 may refer to:

- Ring 5 (ring of Uranus)
- Ring 5 (Copenhagen), a proposed ring road in Denmark

== See also ==
- Ring (disambiguation)
- 5th Ring Road, in Beijing, China
