= Claude Cormier =

Canadian landscape architect and urban designer (1960–2023)

Claude Cormier CQ RCA
- Born: June 22, 1960; Princeville, Quebec, Canada
- Died: September 15, 2023 (aged 63); Montreal, Quebec, Canada
- Education: University of Guelph; University of Toronto; Harvard University
- Occupation: Architect
- Website: ccxa.ca

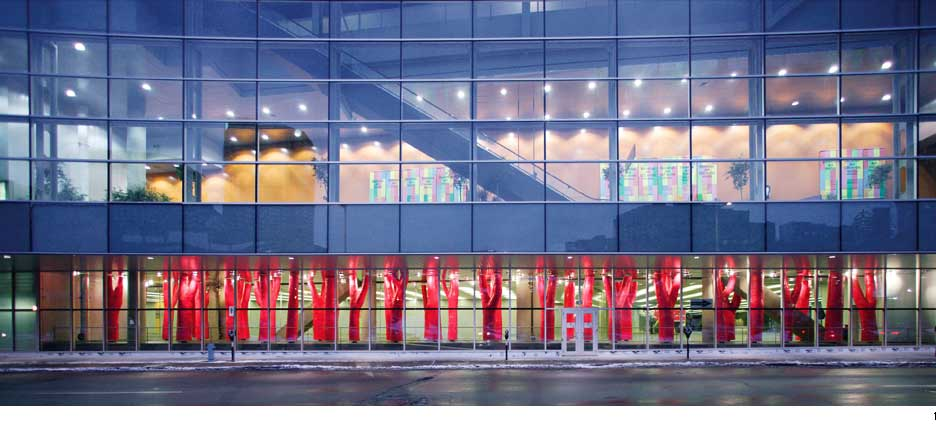
"Lipstick Forest", Palais de congres, seen from exterior.

Claude Cormier CQ RCA (June 22, 1960 – September 15, 2023) was a Canadian landscape architect from Quebec. The majority of his projects are located in Montreal and Toronto. His landscape practice was founded in 1994. In March 2022, the practice Claude Cormier + associes became CCxA in light of new partners.

== Biography ==
Claude Cormier studied History & Theory of Design at Harvard University, Landscape Architecture at the University of Toronto, Agronomy at the University of Guelph, and established the firm CCxA (formerly Claude Cormier et Associés) in Montreal in 1994. Over the years, the firm has been engaged to work on major public works in Montreal, Toronto, and the USA and has received more than 100 awards. In 2010, the Harvard University Graduate School of Design organised an exclusive retrospective exhibition of the firm "Erratics". In 2009, Cormier was Knighted to the Ordre National du Québec, the province's highest distinction for individuals who have contributed to the development and leadership of Quebec. Cormier was also selected as an Emerging Voice for North America by the Architectural League of New York, as well as one of 14 international designers advancing the design field by Fast Company Magazine. Last year the firm was invited by Phaidon Press to be featured in a publication as one of the top 30 worldwide Landscape architects in the world. Serious Fun: The Landscapes of Claude Cormier, the first book exclusively dedicated to Claude Cormier's practice, was published in Fall 2021 at Oro editions. Cormier died on September 15, 2023, at the age of 63, of multiple cancers caused by Li-Fraumeni syndrome.

In 2024, Claude Cormier was posthumously awarded the 2024 Governor General's Medal in Landscape Architecture (GGMLA) from the Canadian Society of Landscape Architects (CSLA).

== Projects ==
=== Design philosophy ===
During his time at Harvard’s Graduate School of Design, Cormier studied the works of two "seemingly contradictory" landscape architects, Martha Schwartz and Frederick Law Olmsted. He once described as main influences as "Martha is mom and Olmsted is dad".

=== Canada ===
- Warehouse Campus Park, Edmonton (2022–)
- Love Park (2018–2023), Toronto
- The Ring, Place Ville Marie, June 2022, Montréal
- RioCan Leaside Centre (2020–2024), Toronto
- Leslie Slip Lookout Park (2020–2022), Toronto
- Vaughan Metropolitan Centre and Smart VMC (2020–2022), Vaughan
- Pensionnat Saint-Nom-de-Marie (2020–2022), Montréal
- 1 Square Phillips (2019–2023), Montréal
- National Bank Headquarters (2019–2023), Montreal
- The Well (2013–2023), Toronto
- Draper Park (2022–), Toronto
- Canadian Institute of the Blind (2015–2023), Edmonton
- Cobe, West Don Lands (2018–2022), Toronto
- St-Clair Block Development – Plan d'ensemble (2018–2022)
- Garrison Point Condos – Plan d'ensemble (2012–2022), King West Village, Toronto
- 2-8 Gloucester (2018–2022), Toronto
- 88 Queen St East (2015–2022), Toronto
- RCA-Lenoir (2020–), Montréal
- 175 Wynford-Don Valley Parkway (2020–), Toronto
- King and Portland Development (2020), Toronto
- Daniels Waterfront/City of the Arts (2020), Toronto Waterfront
- Musée Pointe-à-Callière – Masterplan (2019), Montréal
- 592 Sherbourne Street/The Selby (2019), Toronto
- Pôle Champlain – Proposition (2019), Ottawa
- Pink Balls / 18 Shades of Gay (2011–2019), Montréal
- 700 St-Jacques (2018–), Montréal
- Breakwater Park (2018), Kingston
- River City Phase 3 (2018), Toronto
- Dorchester Square and Place du Canada (2008–2018), Montréal
- Collège Ahuntsic (2018), Montréal
- Vaughan Metropolitan Centre – Masterplan (2018), Vaughan
- Vaughan Metropolitan Centre Bus Terminal Block (2013–), Vaughan
- TOM I, II, III, IV (2012–2014, 2017), Musée des beaux-arts de Montréal, Montréal
- Balade pour la paix (2017), Montréal
- Parc Jean-Drapeau – Plan de mise en valeur et réaménagement (2017), Montréal
- Jardin Frédéric Back du Musée des beaux-arts de Montréal (2017), Montréal
- Cité archéologique Place d'Youville, Musée de Pointe-à-Callière (2017), Montréal
- Berczy Park (2017), Toronto
- National Holocaust Monument with Studio Daniel Libeskind and Edward Burtynsky (2017), Ottawa
- Curtis Block (2016–), Calgary
- Scrivener Square (2016–), Toronto
- CIBC Commerce Court (2016–), Toronto
- The Sony Centre for the Performing Arts and L-Tower (2016), Toronto
- 300 Front Street (2015), Toronto
- Performing Arts Centre & Brock University School of Fine and Performing Arts (2015), St. Catharines
- 117 Peter Street (2015), Toronto
- Au grand dam (2015), Ville LaSalle
- One The Esplanade (2014), Toronto
- Le Château Appartements (2013), Montreal
- Blue Stick Garden (1999–2013), Métis sur mer, Montreal, Winnipeg
- Four Seasons Hotel and Residences (2012), Toronto
- Clock Tower Beach (2012), Montreal
- Parc Hydro-Québec (2012), Montreal
- Canadian Centre for Architecture (1992–2010), Montreal
- Sugar Beach (2010), Toronto
- Evergreen Brickworks (2010), Toronto
- Canadian Museum of History Plaza (2010), Gatineau
- Benny Farm (2010), Montreal
- Place d'Youville (2008), Montreal
- HtO Urban Beach (2007), Toronto
- Entrepôt Frigorifique – Masterplan (2006), Montreal
- Université du Quebec à Montreal, Campus des sciences (2005), Montreal
- Commissioners Park – Concept (2004), Toronto
- Place des Arts – Masterplan (2003), Montreal
- Lipstick Forest (2002), Montreal
- Blue Lawn, Canadian Centre for Architecture (1997), Montreal

In Toronto, Cormier won two design competitions for the Sugar Beach project and for the HtO project.

=== USA and abroad ===
- Cascade Park (2021), Chicago (USA)
- Buchwald Plaza (2019), Mount Vernon (USA)
- Rice University – Masterplan (2019), Houston (USA)
- Blue Forest, Nissan Design America (2007), Detroit and La Jolla (USA)
- Pergola, Biennale d'art contemporain (2006), Le Havre (France)
- Blue Tree, Cornerstone Festival of Architectural Gardens (2005), Sonoma (USA)
- Blue Stick Garden (2005), Chicago (USA)
- Blue Stick Garden, Hestercombe Gardens (2004), Taunton (England)
- Solange (2003), Lyon (France)
- International Mosaïcultures of Montréal – Masterplan (2003), Dubaï, UAE
- Shanghai's Montreal Garden (2000), Shanghai (China)
- Red Lawn, Schindler House MAK Center (1999), Los Angeles (USA)
