= The Ring =

The Ring may refer to:

== Arts and entertainment ==
- The Ring (franchise), a Japanese horror media franchise

=== Literature ===
- The Ring, a 1967 novel by Richard Chopping
- The Ring, a 1988 book by Daniel Keys Moran
- The Ring, a 1980 novel by Danielle Steel, which formed the basis for the 1996 film
- The Ring, a 1964 children's book by John Updike
- The Ring (magazine), a boxing periodical
- "The Ring" (poem), by Heinrich Wittenwiler
- The Ring: Boxing the 20th Century, 1993 book

=== Film ===
- The Ring (1927 film), by Alfred Hitchcock
- The Ring (1952 film), by Kurt Neumann
- The Ring (1985 film), a Romanian film
- The Rings, a 1985 Iranian horror mystery film
- The Ring (1996 film), or Danielle Steel's The Ring, a TV film
- Ring (film), or The Ring, a 1998 Japanese horror film
  - The Ring (2002 film), a remake starring Naomi Watts
- The Ring (2007 film), a Canadian drama film
- The Ring (2017 film), working title of Jab Harry Met Sejal, a 2017 Indian film by Imtiaz Ali

=== Television ===
- "The Ring" (Angel), a 2000 episode of Angel
- The Ring (Chuck), a fictional spy organization in Chuck
- "The Ring" (South Park), a 2009 episode of South Park
- "The Ring" (Yes, Dear), an episode of Yes, Dear

=== Music ===
- Der Ring des Nibelungen ('The Ring of the Nibelung'), a cycle of operas by Richard Wagner
- The Ring (album), by Terri Hendrix, 2002

== Other uses ==
- The Ring in Southwark, London, England, a boxing stadium run by Bella Burge
- Nürburgring, or the Ring, a German race track
- The Ring (rock formation), in Bulgaria
- The Ring: Terror's Realm, a 2000 video game
- The Ring (Montreal), an art installation in Montreal

== See also ==
- Ring (disambiguation)
- The Circle (disambiguation)
- One Ring, a fictional ring of power in J. R. R. Tolkien's Middle-earth
- Ring Nebula, a planetary nebula
