= Berczy Park =

Park in Toronto, Ontario, Canada

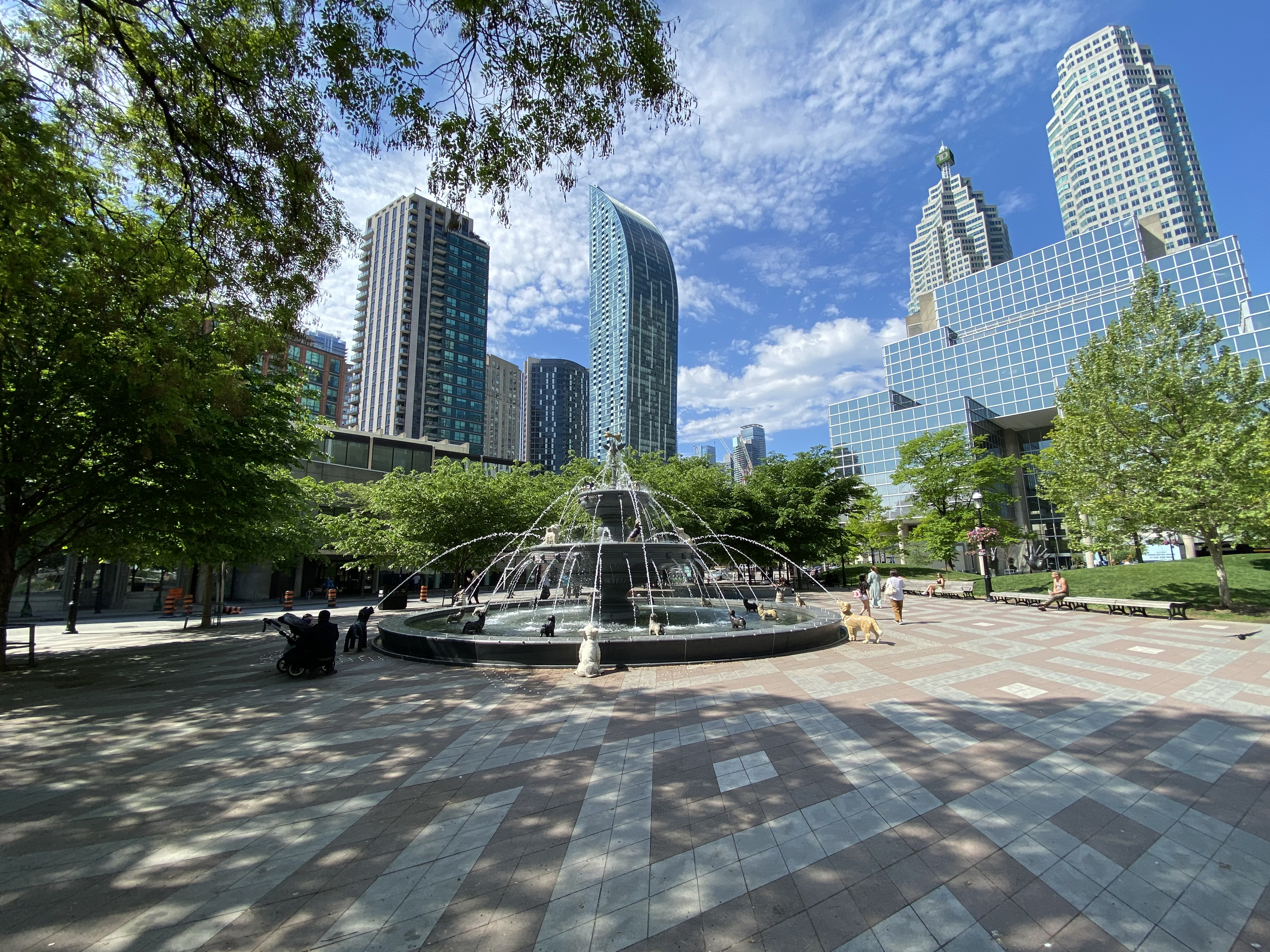
- Dog fountain in Berczy Park

- Location within Toronto
- Type: Urban park
- Location: 35 Wellington St E, Toronto, Ontario, Canada
- Coordinates: 43°38′53″N 79°22′31″W
- Owner: City of Toronto
- Operator: Toronto Parks, Forestry & Recreation
- Public transit: King; 121; 503
- Website: Berczy Park

Berczy Park is a 0.4-hectare park in downtown Toronto, Ontario, Canada. The park is triangular in shape, bounded by Scott Street, Front Street and Wellington Street. The park is bordered at its eastern tip, where Wellington and Front join, by the Gooderham Building, a heritage building that is an example of a "flatiron building". A mural is located on the western facade of the building.

The park is named after William Berczy, an architect and surveyor, who worked with John Graves Simcoe, the first Governor of Upper Canada, in founding its capital, York, Upper Canada, the town that grew into Toronto.

== History ==
The park was opened in 1980, replacing a parking lot. Prior to the 1950s, the site was occupied by office building behind both the Gooderham and Coffin Block. The park was closed in September 2015 for renovation. A key focal point of the renovated park was the replacement of the park's original fountain, with a larger two-tier fountain that incorporated sculptures. The park was redesigned by landscape architect Claude Cormier of Montreal, who also designed Toronto's Sugar Beach. The renovations cost $7.2 million.

The renovation was the first since the park opened. Among the required work was the removal of several large trees that had outgrown the soil reservoir provided for them. Fifty new trees were planted in Silva Cell growing chambers, each tree having 30 cubic metres (1,100 cu ft) of soil provided for its roots to grow. The park officially reopened on June 28, 2017.

== Features ==
The distinctive feature of the park is a large, two-tier fountain with cast-iron statues of 27 dogs and a cat, affectionately named "Pam McCat" after the late councillor Pam McConnell, who spearheaded the construction of the park. The dogs are all looking up towards a large bone perched on the fountain's peak. Pam, the cat is looking north at statues of two small birds perched on the arm of a lamp post about 3 m (9.8 ft) away from the fountain. The fountain also includes a ground-level trough to provide drinking water for real dogs. Each of the dog statues contributes to the fountain function by sprouting water upwards from their mouths. There is also a second cat statue perched on an electrical box at the southwest corner of the park looking west towards an upcoming Cat Park.

At the east end of the park, there is an irrigated pea gravel patch, intended for dog owners to allow their pets to do their business. The landscaping includes grassy berms and garden beds. A children's play area is planned for the northwest corner of the park. Scott Street, on the west side of the park, features curbless borders and pavers to integrate the street into the park design. The City's Economic Development and Culture Division has commissioned a public artwork titled Jacob's Ladder by Toronto artist Luis Jacob. It will be installed in late 2017 on the west side of the park.
