= Ringing =

Ringing may mean:

== Vibrations ==
- Ringing (signal), unwanted oscillation of a signal, leading to ringing artifacts
- Vibration of a harmonic oscillator
  - Bell ringing
- Ringing (telephony), the sound of a telephone bell
- Ringing (medicine), a ringing sound in the ears

== Other uses ==
- Bird ringing, using numbered small metal pr plastic leg rings to track birds
- Ringing (of vehicles), the illegal practice of stealing a vehicle and replacing its identification number with that of another vehicle of the same model which has been a write-off

== See also ==
- Wringing (disambiguation)
- Ring (disambiguation)
