= Ringe =

Ringe may refer to:

== People ==
- Don Ringe (born c. 1946), media consultant
- Donald Ringe, linguist
- Ivo Ringe (born 1951), artist
- Philip Theodor Ringe (1824–1882), silversmith
- Vishwanath Rao Ringe (1922–2005), vocalist

== Places ==
- Ringe Municipality, Denmark
- Ringe, Denmark
- Ringe, Germany
- Ringe, Minnesota

== See also ==
- Ring (disambiguation)
