= Love Park (Toronto) =

Public park in Toronto, Canada

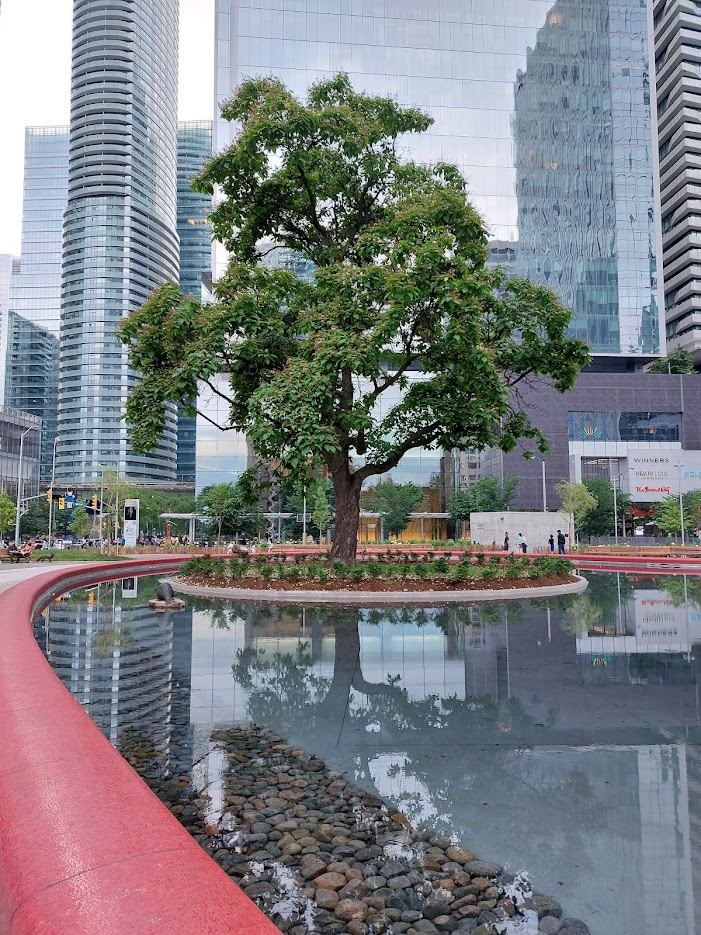
- Love Park (2023)

- Location within Toronto
- Type: Urban park
- Location: 96 Queens Quay West, Toronto, Ontario, Canada
- Coordinates: 43°38′27″N 79°22′47″W
- Area: 2 acres (0.81 ha)
- Created: 2023
- Designer: CCxA
- Owner: City of Toronto
- Operator: Toronto Parks, Forestry & Recreation
- Website: www.toronto.ca/love-park/

Love Park is a public park located in the South Core of Toronto, Ontario, Canada. Developed by Waterfront Toronto, and designed by CCxA, the park is operated by Toronto Parks, Forestry and Recreation. Construction on Love Park began in July 2021, and the park officially opened on June 23, 2023.

== Project site ==
Love Park's site is the former plot of the York-Bay-Yonge eastbound off-ramp of the Gardiner Expressway. The off-ramp was removed in 2016–2017 to reclaim the space for the community by allowing for the widening of Harbour Street to improve pedestrian and cyclist access to the waterfront. The allotted space is 0.81 hectares (2 acres) in the Financial District of the Toronto harbourfront. The allotted budget for the construction of the park is approximately CA$7 million. The project was planned to break ground in 2019 though due to delays was not started until 2021.

== Design ==
Love Park was designed by CCxA (formerly Claude Cormier + associes) landscape architects based in Montreal. They worked with gh3*, an architecture firm in Toronto. “The park was designed to be an alter ego for its surroundings of large and reflective glass-clad structures.” The design of Love Park follows a classic design strategy with a central water installation surrounded by lush green spaces. This strategy is reflected in parks and installations around the world and has been utilized for generations. This design strategy is also seen in Natrel Rink, Nathan Phillips Square, and Paul Quarrington Ice Rink and Splash Pad. These are three public spaces that are near Love Park and similarly have central water features. Love Park is a continuation of Toronto's efforts to revitalize its harbourfront community and bring green spaces to areas dominated by skyscrapers.

== Features ==
Love Park has a number of features to augment the space. The largest such feature is the heart-shaped reflecting pool in the middle of the park. According to Cormier, the heart design was inspired by an image he saw on social media following the 2018 Toronto van attack, while the red tile surrounding the pool references mosaics in Park Güell. “Within the reflecting pool it will have a small island with red and pink flowers as well as a large, illuminated heart that will be suspended above.” The reflecting pool will be a central water feature. The park also will have a fully mirrored arcade that creates a functional pavilion that's interior houses a universal washroom and a coffee kiosk for parkgoers to utilize while providing shelter from the elements for a number of seating areas. The pavilion will be a space for residents of the community, people who work in the commercial buildings, and tourists to have a rest, eat lunch, or have a morning coffee while experiencing the park. Love Park also has several clearings and platforms for the display of public art installations and to facilitate small gatherings.
