= Ring 3 =

Ring 3 may refer to:

- Ring III, a road in Helsinki region, Finland
- Ring 3 (Oslo), a road Norway
- Ring 3 (computer security)

== See also ==
- Three-ring (disambiguation)
- Third Ring Road (disambiguation)
- Ring Ring Ring (disambiguation)
- Ring (disambiguation)
- Loop (novel), the third Ring novel
- Rings (2017 film), third film in the American-remake Ring film series
- Ring 0: Birthday, third film in the Japanese Ring film series
