= Ring structure =

Ring structure may refer to:

- Chiastic structure, a literary technique
- Heterocyclic compound, a chemical structure
- Ring (mathematics), an algebraic structure
- Ring dike, a geographic structure

== See also ==
- Ring (disambiguation)
