= Third Ring Road =

Third Ring Road may refer to:

- 3rd Ring Road (Beijing)
- Third Ring Expressway (Isfahan)
- 3rd Ring Road (Kunming)
- Third Ring Road (Moscow)
- R3 (ring road) of Charleroi, Belgium
- Ring 3 (Hamburg), Germany
- Ring 3 (Oslo), Norway

== See also ==
- List of ring roads
- Ring 3 (disambiguation)
- Three-ring (disambiguation)
