= Power ring =

Power ring or ring(s) of power may refer to:

== Fictional entities ==
- Power ring (DC Comics), an object featured in comic books
- Power Ring (character), several comic book characters
- Rings of Power, fictional artefacts in J. R. R. Tolkien's legendarium

== Media ==
- Rings of Power (video game), for the Sega Genesis/Mega Drive, 1992
- Rock & Rule (known as Ring of Power outside North America), a 1983 film
- The Lord of the Rings: The Rings of Power, an Amazon Prime Video television series set in Tolkien's Middle-earth
- "The Ring of Powers", an episode of Ugly Americans

== See also ==
- Great Ring (disambiguation)
- Magic ring, a mythical, folkloric or fictional piece of jewellery
- Ring (disambiguation)
- Ring circuit, an electrical wiring technique
