= Draper Street (Toronto) =

Street in Toronto, Ontario, Canada

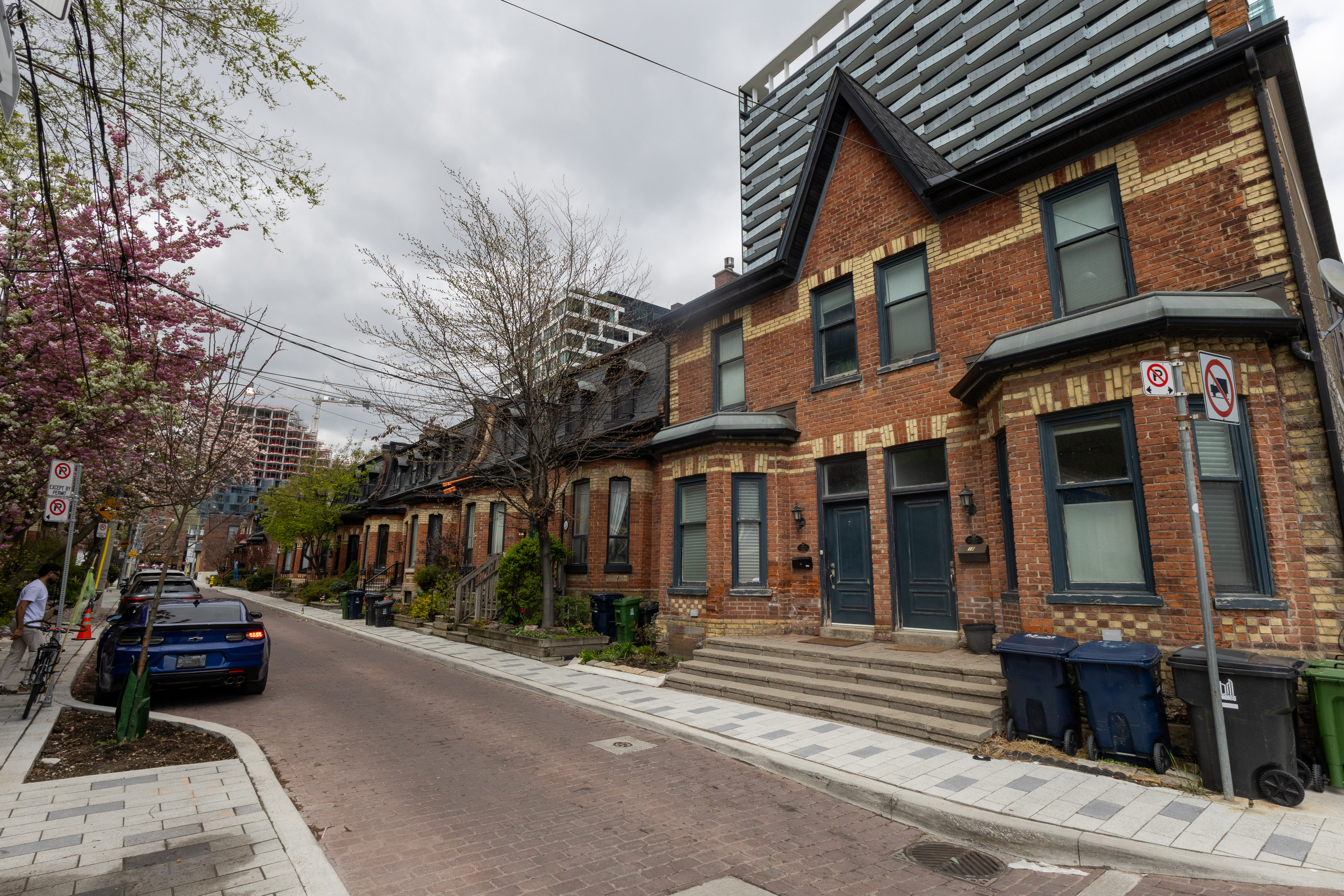
- Maintained by: City of Toronto government
- Location: Toronto
- North end: Wellington Street
- South end: Front Street

Draper Street is a street in downtown Toronto, Ontario, Canada. It is a north–south street located to the west of Spadina Avenue, from Front Street West north to Wellington Street. Draper Street is notable for its collection of 28 nineteenth-century row cottages of the Second Empire style. They were designated by the City of Toronto government in the 1990s to have heritage status. The entire street is designated as a Heritage Conservation District as a way to preserve its heritage for posterity.

The street is named after William Henry Draper, a lawyer, judge, and politician in Upper Canada, which became Canada West. The street was laid out in an 1856 plan of subdivision by J. Stoughton Dennis, on lands that were part of the 1794 Garrison Reserve. Draper and Charles Jones are listed as the property owners of the lots to be subdivided for development. The street is narrow, at 32 feet (9.8 m) wide. The lots are all 88 feet (27 m) deep and vary in width from 22 feet (6.7 m) to 32 feet (9.8 m) wide.

Construction did not begin immediately after the subdividing of the properties. In 1857, an economic depression started, which may have delayed construction. The one-and-a-half-storey cottages were built from 1881 to 1889 by developer Jonathan Madell. First, seven cottages were built on the east side of the street in 1881, and four cottages on the west side from 1881–l to 1882 that were designed by architect J. A. Fowler. In 1886, two houses were built on the corners of Draper Street and Front Street West. In 1889, the row cottages of #20–32 were built on the west side of the street.

In 1997, the residents of Draper Street requested the Board of Heritage Toronto to designate the properties under the Ontario Heritage Act. The board voted to designate the properties, and Toronto City Council approved the designation on February 4, 1999, under By-law 026-99. Of the original cottages, #19 and #21 had been torn down, #27 had its facade replaced, and #29 had its facade remodelled. The two houses on the northwest corner of Front and Draper were torn down to make a commercial building facing on Front.

The areas to the north and the east of the street are the site of redevelopment. The condominium project "The Well" now exists on the industrial lands to the east that used to be home to The Globe and Mail's headquarters. A vacant lot on Draper Street was converted into a parkette connecting to the project lands. A 16-storey condominium is proposed for the corner of Wellington Street West and Draper.

== Draper Park ==
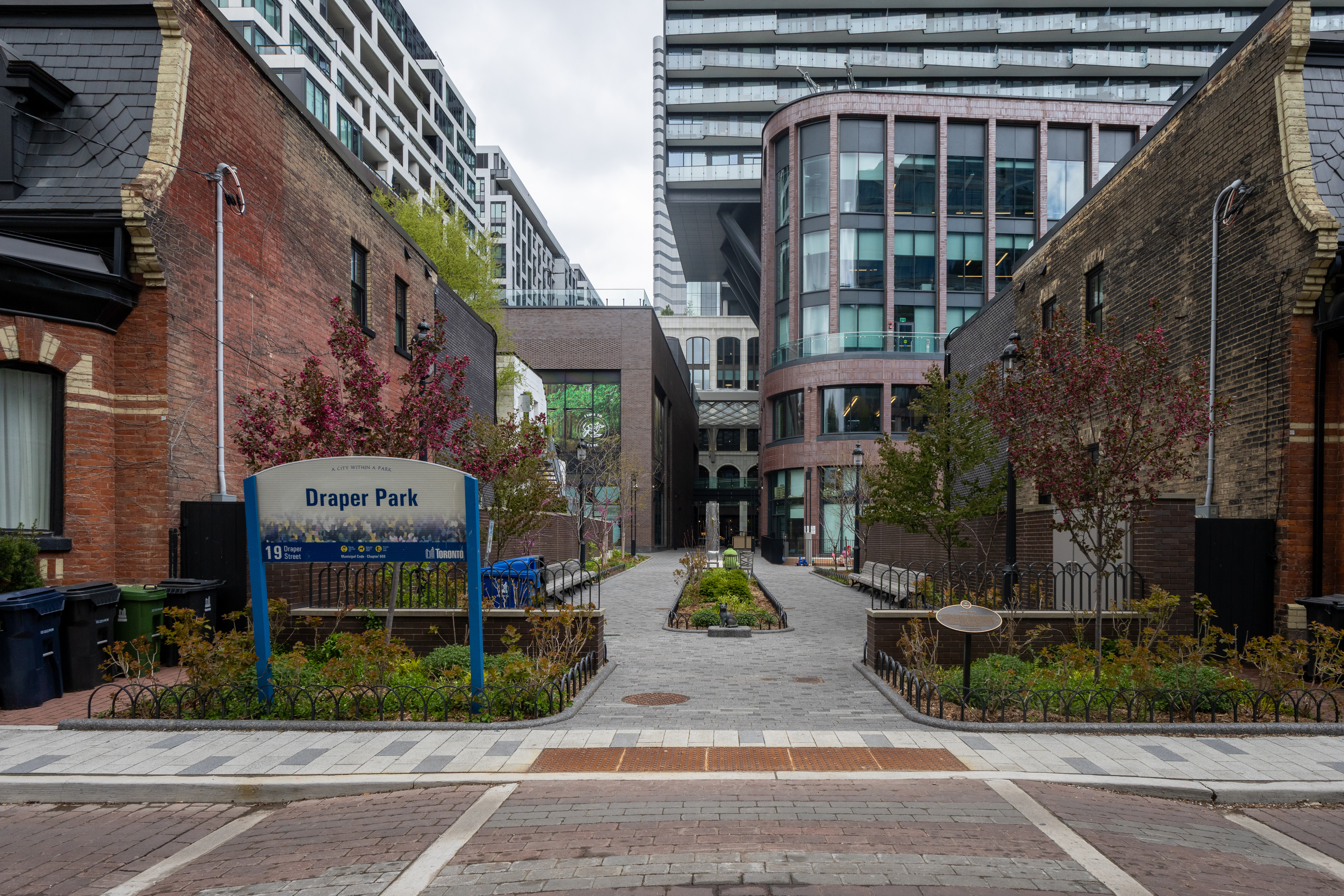
Draper Park in 2026

A narrow park, Draper Park, opened in 2022 at Draper Street north of Front Street, connecting Draper with a nearby development east of the street. The park is just 11 metres (36 ft) wide and 15 metres (49 ft) long. A property developer received permission to redevelop that 7.8 acres (3.2 hectares) property, if compensated for the higher density, if they purchased nearby properties, and turned them into park space. This short walkway is part of the developer's deal. The new park features a paved walkway with gardens, benches and cat statue and was designed by Claude Cormier.

The site was once occupied by 19-21 Draper Street, Second Empire semi-detached units built in 1881 by Richard Humphries, demolished in 1941–42 before replaced by Farrell Plastics Limited factory (along with 17 Draper Street) in 1950 and vacant after fire in 1969. More recently it was fenced off with a plaque commemorating the history of Draper Street.

== Notable persons ==
- Lincoln Alexander was born on Draper Street
