= The Ring (Montreal) =

2022 sculpture by Claude Cormier

- L’Anneau (French)
- The Ring
- Artist: Claude Cormier
- Year: 2022
- Dimensions: 30 m diameter (98 ft)
- Weight: 23,000 kg (51,000 lb)
- Location: Montreal; 45.501411°N 73.570012°W
- Website: https://placevillemarie.com/en/the-ring

The Ring located in Montreal

The Ring (French: L’Anneau) is a sculpture located at the Place Ville Marie in Montréal, Canada, designed by Claude Cormier + associes and erected in June 2022. The sculpture weighs around 23,000 kilograms (51,000 lb), spans 30 metres (98 ft) and cost over CA$5,000,000 of taxpayer and private money. The sculpture is heated to prevent snow buildup, and has vibration dampers to prevent damage during high winds and earthquakes.
