= Ring 1 =

Ring 1 may refer to:

== Roads ==
- Ring I, in Finland
- Ring 1 (Aarhus), in Denmark
- Ring 1 (Hamburg), in Germany

== Other uses ==
- RING1, a gene
- Ring 1, the first magic club of the International Brotherhood of Magicians
- Ring 1, a protection ring in computer security

== See also ==
- Ring (disambiguation)
- One ring (disambiguation)
- The Ring (franchise)
  - Ring (film), a 1998 Japanese horror film, first in a series
  - The Ring (2002 film), an American horror film, first in a series
