= Cirkus (soundtrack) =

- Soundtrack album cover for Cirkus

Soundtrack album by Devi Sri Prasad, Hiten-Badshah and Lijo George-DJ Chetas
- Released: 3 January 2023
- Recorded: 2021–2022
- Studios: YRF Studios, Mumbai; Soundideaz, Mumbai; DSP Studio, Chennai
- Genre: Film soundtrack
- Length: 10:04
- Language: Hindi
- Label: T-Series
- Producers: Lijo George; Devi Sri Prasad; Badshah

Singles from Cirkus
- 1. "Current Laga Re" Released: 8 December 2022; 2. "Sun Zara" Released: 16 December 2022; 3. "Aashiqui" Released: 21 December 2022

Cirkus is the soundtrack album to the 2022 Indian Hindi-language action comedy film of the same name, directed by Rohit Shetty. The film was produced by Rohit Shetty Productionz and T-Series Films. The soundtrack was composed by Devi Sri Prasad, Hiten-Badshah and Lijo George-DJ Chetas, while the background score was composed by Amar Mohile.

The film featured three tracks with lyrics written by Kumaar, and Badshah. The album was released by T-Series on 3 January 2023, post the film's release. The track "Current Laga Re" created the record for reaching 30 million views, within 24 hours of its release. The tracks "Current Laga Re" and "Sun Zara", topped the national charts, in all music and video platforms.

== Production ==
In early-May 2021, it was reported that Rohit Shetty roped Devi Sri Prasad to compose the songs for the film, marking their maiden collaboration. He composed a dance number and romantic track for the film's soundtrack album. In January 2022, Prasad said "I was thrilled when I got a call from Rohit Shetty sir. I am really excited about this collaboration. We have already done the song, and it is the kind of track that I always wanted to compose in Hindi. It has a nice melody but it also has a sweet lovable groove to it." In an interview, Prasad said "I'm really looking forward to Rohit Shetty's film Cirkus. They are going to be straight Hindi songs and have a very nice melody. It has a nice groove to it. I was waiting to compose that kind of a song in Hindi, and Rohit sir really liked the song. I want to see how people will react to it."

In March 2022, in a guest appearance on India's Got Talent season 9, Rohit Shetty told the contestants Divyansh and Manuraj that they and Badshah would compose the theme song of the film. The duo Lijo George-DJ Chetas composed a track for the film, marking after fourth collaboration with the director, after Golmaal Again (2017), Simmba (2018), and Sooryavanshi and second with Ranveer Singh after Simmba. Hiten and Badshah also composed a track. Shetty further roped lyricist Kumaar to write the lyrics for the songs, with Badshah penning a song. The background score was composed by Amar Mohile. The music rights were acquired by T-Series.

== Composition ==
The first single "Current Laga Re" was composed by the duo Lijo George-DJ Chetas. The track was sung by Nakash Aziz, Jonita Gandhi, Dhvani Bhanushali, and Lijo George himself. The Tamil rap was sung by Vivek Hariharan. The lyrics of the song was penned by Kumaar with Tamil rap by Hari.

The second single "Sun Zara" was composed by Devi Sri Prasad with lyrics written by Kumaar. It was sung by Papon, Shreya Ghoshal. Prasad used 60s tune to match the film setting. Speaking about the romantic track, he said "the song has a different vibe to it and Ranveer has added his own touch."

The third single "Aashiqui" had the music similar to Badshah's "Jugnu". The song was composed and written by Badshah himself. The music for the song provided by Hiten and was sung by Badshah and Amrita Singh. The song also has 60s tune.

== Marketing and release ==
The first single's teaser was unveiled on 7 December 2022. The song titled "Current Laga Re" was released on 8 December. The release coincided with a promotional event held in Mumbai. Ranveer Singh, Rohit Shetty and Deepika Padukone was present at the event.

The second single's teaser was unveiled on 15 December 2022. On 16 December 2022, the makers released the song "Sun Zara". The third single's teaser was unveiled on 20 December. The third single titled "Aashiqui" was released on 21 December 2022.

== Music videos ==
The music videos were choreographed by Ganesh Acharya. The music video of the song "Current Laga Re", featuring Ranveer Singh and Deepika Padukone was choreographed by Ganesh Acharya. The dance number was shot in mid-February 2021 for five days in Mumbai. Shetty said "When we shot "Current Laga Re" for five days, nobody bothered to even look at Ranveer! Everyone present on the sets were inquisitively watching Deepika only." Padukone said "It felt like I was bringing alive the Meenamma in me again. They always say that every character that you play comes from a little bit of your own personality. I do feel like a lot of Meenamma or the character that you're seeing in this song, is inherently me. It's just maybe you all don't get to see it as often just because I'm shy". The music video of "Sun Zara" featuring Pooja Hegde and Jacqueline Fernandez with Singh was shot in early December 2021 at Ooty. About the song shooting of "Aashiqui", Hegde said "You had to have like hit the mark before the camera reaches because there are two Ranveers. And it's all in one shot and it would be like– we would be waiting, just when the camera pans to us we have to do our step. And if one person messed up, we have to start all over again. It was exhausting for him [Ranveer Singh] especially because he was dancing with both of us [Pooja and Jacqueline]. So, he was almost like in every frame." Post the release of song, Jacqueline posted several pictures from the sets of song shoot.

== Track listing ==
No.	Title	Lyrics	Music	Singer(s)	Length
1.	"Current Laga Re"	Kumaar	Lijo George-DJ Chetas	Nakash Aziz, Jonita Gandhi, Dhvani Bhanushali, Lijo George, Vivek Hariharan	3:46
2.	"Sun Zara"	Kumaar	Devi Sri Prasad	Papon, Shreya Ghoshal	3:35
3.	"Aashiqui"	Badshah	Hiten, Badshah	Badshah, Amrita Singh	2:43
Total length:					10:04

== Reception ==
Komal Nahta in his review wrote "The 'Bijli' song (Current Laga Re) is of the popular variety. The other songs are just about fair. Lyrics (Kumaar, Badshah and Hari) are in synch with the mood of the film. Song picturisations (by Ganesh Acharya) are eye-filling. Amar Mohile's background music ought to have been far better." A critic of Bollywood Hungama wrote "Amar Mohile's background score adds to the cinematic feel. Ganesh Acharya's choreography is catchy."

Monika Rawal Kukreja of Hindustan Times wrote "Deepika Padukone's cameo in the song Current Laga Re might compensate for all the missing fun". Pratikshya Mishra of The Quint wrote "the music, credited to DSP, Lijo George- DJ Chetas and Badshah, with lyrics by Kumaar & Badshah, is catchy and little else. To its credit, the track 'Current Laga Re' featuring a magnificent cameo by Deepika Padukone has definite earworm potential."

== Impact ==
The song "Current Laga Re" started trending in the charts after its release. The song was The Financial Express's five top-charting songs in 2022. The second single "Sun Zara" too was trending in the charts post release.

== Controversy ==
After the release of the song "Current Laga Re", some listeners felt it was copy of "Blockbuster" song from Sarrainodu. Nakash Aziz, the singer of the track, stated "maybe people are making this judgement based on the rhythm, music, as the song also has Tamil lyrics. But it is not something due to which we need to take offence."
