= List of Mobile Suit Gundam AGE episodes =

Cover of the fourth DVD volume by Bandai Visual.

This is a list of episodes from the anime series Mobile Suit Gundam AGE. The series premiered on October 9, 2011, on the terrestrial MBS and TBS networks, occupying the networks' noted Sunday 5:00 p.m. schedule.

The story of this installment of the Gundam meta-series is divided into four arcs. Each of the first three arcs focus on one among three different protagonists who are members of the same family (a father, his son and his grandson), each one piloting his own version of the eponymous mecha during an interplanetary conflict that spans a whole century. The first arc is set between episodes 1 and 15, with Asu e (明日へ, To Tomorrow) by Galileo Galilei as its opening song and Kimi no Naka no Eiyū (君の中の英雄, The Hero Within You) by Minami Kuribayashi as its ending song. The second arc is set between episodes 16 and 28, with "sharp#" by Negoto as its opening song, and "My World" by SPYAIR as its ending song. The third arc is set between episodes 29 and 39 with "Real" by ViViD as its opening song, and "WHITE Justice" by Faylan as its ending song. A fourth and final arc focusing on all three protagonists at once is set between episodes 40 and 49 with "AURORA" by Aoi Eir as its opening song, and "Forget-me-not ~Wasurenagusa~" by FLOWER as its ending song.

== Arc 1: Flit ==
No.	Title	Original release date
1	"Saviour Gundam"; Transliteration: "Kyūseishu Gandamu" (Japanese: 救世主ガンダム)	October 9, 2011
A.G. 115: Orphaned by the Unknown Enemy (U.E.) assault on his home colony Orvan 7 years ago, Flit Asuno is raised on the Federation military's Arinston Base on Space Colony Nora. Believing that the day will come when humanity can turn the tide against the U.E., he uses plans found in the AGE Device left to him by his mother to develop mankind's saviour--the mobile suit "Gundam". Then, Nora is attacked by a new type of U.E. mobile suit. Flit pilots the Gundam he built to defend the people of Nora.
2	"The Power of AGE"; Transliteration: "Eiji no Chikara" (Japanese: AGEの力)	October 16, 2011
Nora fell under the U.E. assault. Commander Bruzar of the Earth Federation Force (E.F.F.) Arinston Base rushes to evacuate the civilians. His lieutenant Grodek, seeking an escape for the people of the space colony, launches the new E.F.F. warship Diva. Flit, piloting the Gundam, also attempts escape, but then notices a girl straggler. While attempting to save her and slip away into space, Flit is attacked by a U.E. To fight off this fierce foe, Flit and Vargas activate the Gundam's powerful "AGE System"...
3	"Shattered Colony"; Transliteration: "Yugamu Koronī" (Japanese: ゆがむコロニー)	October 23, 2011
Space Colony Nora's collapse has almost reached the point of no return. Having taken the girl into his Gundam, Flit escapes into space, only to encounter a new, black enemy mobile suit. Meanwhile, Lieutenant Colonel Grodek, who has taken command of the Diva, fights to control the Colony Core and save Nora's inhabitants from its collapse. Base Commander Bruzar remains on Nora to complete the final preparation for the Colony Core's ejection. They each risk their lives, giving their all for survival. As the Gundam and its shadowy foe face off, Flit hears unexpected words from the girl...
4	"White Wolf"; Transliteration: "Shiroi Ōkami" (Japanese: 白い狼)	October 30, 2011
Federation ace pilot Woolf Enneacle a.k.a. 'White Wolf' wakes up from the cold sleep chamber aboard the Diva. Upon learning Flit has become the first person to defeat a U.E. mobile suit, he begins to take interest in Flit's Gundam and tries to claim it for his own. Much to Flit's chagrin, they decide to have a mock battle to determine who should pilot the mobile suit. However, during the mock battle, the two bumped into the UE mothership, and end up making a startling discovery about how the UE have been able to remain hidden all these years.
5	"Demon Boy"; Transliteration: "Mashounen" (Japanese: 魔少年)	November 6, 2011
The Diva docks at Fardain. Flit, thrown into the chaos of combat, resolves to become stronger. Lost in thought as he races a Hoveride, Flit hits and injures a boy named Desil on the streets of Fardain. Flit invites Desil to the Diva for treatment, but he shortly becomes more trouble than anyone planned on. The U.E.'s assaults reach Fardain. The Gundam sorties. But just who is the pilot!?
6	"Light and Shadow in Fardain"; Transliteration: "Fādēn no Hikari to Kage" (Japanese: ファーデーンの光と影)	November 13, 2011
Flit and Emily, caught up in a mobile suit battle which rages through Fardain, seek shelter in its undercity. There they encounter Iwark Bria, a man living on the edge. He tells them of the battles between the Euba and Zalam syndicates for control of Fardain. At that moment, Iwark's daughter Riria surfaces and is caught in a battle between mobile suits. Iwark attempts to protect her using a construction MS. Flit sorties in the Gundam to save them both. As the mobile suit battle rages through Fardain, a new enemy suddenly appears...
7	"Gundam Evolves"; Transliteration: "Shinka-suru Gandamu" (Japanese: 進化するガンダム)	November 20, 2011
Flit, imprisoned by Zalam for the destruction he wreaked, is brought before their leader Don Boyage. Flit argues that Zalam and Euba should cease their feud over control of Fardain, but is rejected by Boyage. Then, Euba's boss Ract Elfamel attacks at the lead of a mobile suit squadron. Another war breaks out within the colony. Flit stands forth in the Gundam to prevent it, but a U.E. assault sparks a three-sided battle. Unable to use beam weapons inside a colony, the Gundam takes on a new form to stand up to the U.E.
8	"Do or Die on the Common Front"; Transliteration: "Kesshi no Kyōdō-sensen" (Japanese: 決死の共同戦線)	November 27, 2011
To take down the U.E. that have infiltrated Fardain, Flit fights in the Gundam's new form: Titus. What the Titus loses by abandoning its Dodds rifle, unusable in colonies, it more than makes up for in brute force. Meanwhile, doubts remain between Zalam and Euba, and clashes erupt as they come together on the battlefield. As the situation becomes more desperate, Flit fights to unite the clashing Zalam and Euba elements under one banner. A new mobile suit rises on the battlefield. Who pilots its alabaster form?
9	"Secret Mobile Suit"; Transliteration: "Himitsu no Mobirusūtsu" (Japanese: 秘密のモビルスーツ)	December 4, 2011
Flit questions Woolf about the source of the new G-EXES. Woolf confesses and leads Flit to his old haunt, the Madorna Factory. Flit is amazed by the range of mobile suits under construction. But then, a shocking sight! Among the other models is a U.E. mobile suit! Flit and company are astounded. Just then, the U.E. suit activates and begins to destroy the contents of the factory. Flit and Woolf fight together against it, but cannot resist its fierce attacks...
10	"D-Day"; Transliteration: "Gekisen no Hi" (Japanese: 激戦の日)	December 11, 2011
A larger U.E. detachment assaults Fardain. Zalam and Euba join together to protect the populace. The Diva joins the battle, ambushing the oncoming U.E. Then, the U.E. mothership arrives. Against this fierce foe, resolves waver. Zalam's leader Don Boyage attempts to inspire his men from the front lines, but... As the desperate fight unfolds, Flit's rage boils over, and he equips a new Ware the AGE System has generated--Spallow. Can Flit defend Fardain!?
11	"Reunion at Minsry"; Transliteration: "Minsurī no Saikai" (Japanese: ミンスリーの再会)	December 18, 2011
The Diva arrives at the neutral Space Colony Minsry. Flit and the others, planning a secret meeting to discuss an assault on the U.E. space fortress, call upon Minsry's leader, a tycoon named Birmings. There, Flit is reunited with Yurin, who was taken in by the Birmings family. As the meetings continue, Yurin opens her heart to Flit, who shares her tragic past. Then, as they return to the Diva, they are stopped by a E.F.F. MS squadron. Grodek has been judged a traitor, and his capture ordered. Flit and the others decide to take on the Federation forces, but...
12	"Course for Counterattack"; Transliteration: "Hangyaku-sha-tachi no Funade" (Japanese: 反逆者たちの船出)	January 1, 2012
The Diva sets sail from Minsry, its preparations to assault the space fortress Ambat complete. However, in its path lies the E.F.F. fleet commanded by Guavaran, who have orders to capture Grodek as a mutineer. As the Diva halts, its path blocked, the U.E. attack. The Federation fleet, beaten back by the fierce U.E. assault, is unable to capture the Diva. The crew of the Diva must decide whether to seize the moment and escape, or rescue Guavaran's fleet and seal their own capture. Grodek, captain of the Diva, must make a crucial decision.
13	"Space Fortress Ambat"; Transliteration: "Uchū Yōsai Anbatto" (Japanese: 宇宙要塞アンバット)	January 8, 2012
The crew of the Diva, pinning their hopes on a decisive final battle, set sail for the space fortress Ambat. The drums of war rise to a fever pitch. The U.E. attack with a force of mobile suits and massive warships. In a battle unlike any they've fought before, the Diva and the combined Zalam-Euba forces clamp down on their fear and fight for survival. Flit, now using his power as an X-rounder, battles a powerful U.E. mobile suit. To preemptively strike the U.E., the Diva changes its form, unveiling a new weapon. Will its light lead mankind to victory!?
14	"Flash of Sorrow"; Transliteration: "Kanashimi no Senkō" (Japanese: 悲しみの閃光)	January 15, 2012
The Battle of Ambat continues. Flit enters a fierce duel with a black mobile suit. He is shocked that its pilot is none other than Desil. Desil, using his well-honed X-rounder abilities, corners Flit. Then, a purple mobile suit enters the fray. Flit is forced to battle two mobile suits at once. The pilot of the purple mobile suit is an unexpected familiar face. Why must we fight, asks Flit? The answer he receives is...
15	"Those Tears Fall In Space"; Transliteration: "Sono Namida, Uchū ni Ochi te" (Japanese: その涙、宇宙に落ちて)	January 22, 2012
The crew infiltrates the space fortress Ambat. Fortress Commander Gerra Zoi pilots the top-of-the line Defurse to defeat the Gundam. The Gundam and Defurse have a final battle inside the fortress, but moved by his hatred towards the UE, Flit finally corners Gerra. But a surprising truth awaits him. What does Gerra tell them about the earth's cursed past? Who are the UE? The truth is revealed!

== Arc 2: Asemu ==
No.	Title	Original release date
16	"The Gundam in the Stable"; Transliteration: "Umagoya no Gandamu" (Japanese: 馬小屋のガンダム)	January 29, 2012
Twenty five years have passed, and history is passed on to a new generation. The war between the Earth Federation and the Vagan, who used to be known as the UE, continues. Federation Military Commander Flit Asuno gives his son Asemu the AGE device on his 17th birthday. Just then, Asemu's colony, Tordia, is attacked by the Vagan. Asemu launches in a hidden Gundam to protect the colony.
17	"Friendship and Love and Mobile Suits"; Transliteration: "Yūjō to Koi to Mobiru Sūtsu" (Japanese: 友情と恋とモビルスーツ)	February 5, 2012
Zeheart joins the Mobile Suit Club and helps Asemu and his friends build a new mobile suit. However Zeheart ia actually a Vagan spy. When his allies learn the Gundam can only be on the Asuno Estates, they task Zeheart with the job of infiltrating the premises. Zeheart locates the Gundam. When the championship of the Colony's Mobile Suit Battles arrive, the Vagan's attack the Asuno Residence hoping to claim Gundam. Asemu runs home to save Gundam, but can he make it in time? Why do the Vagan's want the Gundam so badly?
18	"Battle at Graduation Ceremony"; Transliteration: "Sotsugyö Shiki no Sentö" (Japanese: 卒業式の戦闘)	February 12, 2012
Graduation day arrives for Zeheart and Asemu. While the Graduation Ceremony is going on, the Military Police arrive and try to arrest Zeheart for being a spy. Asemu defends him, and one of Zeheart's allies lays a distraction allowing Zeheart to escape. In order to escape Zeheart gets into his Mobile Suit, but this leads to a battle with Asemu where Zeheart's identity is revealed to Asemu and Romary. Commander Woolf arrives and chases off Zeheart, but Asemu can't help but remember Zeheart's words- he's too kind to be a warrior.
19	"Asemu Sets Off"; Transliteration: "Asemu no Tabidachi" (Japanese: アセムの旅立ち)	February 19, 2012
Asemu and Romary both join the Military forces and are placed on the Diva. Asemu's Mobile Suit Commander is none other than Commander Woolf, and his father is now main superior at the Big Ring. The Vagan counter by placing Zeheart in charge of their main forces. As the Diva begins to leave the colony, Dique is revealed to be the new ship technician for the Diva. The Vagan attack the Diva suspecting Gundam is aboard it. However the Gundam AGE-1 has been sent ahead with Flit, and Asemu is forced to wait as the AGE system makes the finishing touches on the new model - Gundam AGE-2. When things appear dire, Asemu is finally able to launch in the AGE-2 where he shows the new pilots and the people on the Diva that he can become a Savior for the new generation.
20	"The Red Mobile Suit"; Transliteration: "Akai Mobiru Sūtsu" (Japanese: 赤いモビルスーツ)	February 26, 2012
The Vagan launch a new model red mobile suit, the Zeydra that enters into a one-on-one battle with AGE-2. The commander of the new mobile suit is none other than Zeheart, who hopes this mobile suit can withstand his X-Rounder abilities.
21	"Looming Illusion"; Transliteration: "Tachihadakaru Genei" (Japanese: 立ちはだかる幻影)	March 4, 2012
After Zeheart spares Asemu's life, Asemu takes the advanced military training test to just to find that despite having all the attributes of a skilled pilot, he has no aptitude to become an X-Rounder. Upon learning of this, Woolfe brings him to the Madorna Workshop to have him perform a special training to hone his skills.
22	"Big Ring Absolute Line of Defense"; Transliteration: "Biggu Ringu Zettai Bōei Sen" (Japanese: ビッグリング絶対防衛線)	March 11, 2012
The Vagan begin a full out attack on the Big Ring. The winner of the battle will have a direct route to Earth that could turn the scale of the war to their side. Commander Flit deploys the suits in a specific strategy hoping to withstand the attack, and Asemu is assigned to the front line where he will once again have to face Zeheart. Meanwhile Flit pilots his old AGE-1 against Desil Galette, now piloting the new mobile suit Khronos in a heated confrontation due to their long dated enmity.
23	"Suspicious Colony"; Transliteration: "Giwaku no Koronī" (Japanese: 疑惑のコロニー)	March 18, 2012
Flit joins the crew of the Diva on a secret mission to investigate a colony suspicious of providing support to the Vagan war effort. When their suspicions are confirmed, Flit orders an attack on the conspirators, but his son opposes him fearing that the lives of innocent colonists may be endangered. Hanging on an impasse between following his father's orders and his own convictions, Asemu is approached by Zeheart. Meanwhile, Grodek Ainoa ends his prison term and gets released.
24	"X-Rounder"; Transliteration: "X Raundā" (Japanese: Xラウンダー)	March 25, 2012
Grodek confesses to Flit that during his time in jail, he had access to information regarding a secret organization from Earth conspiring with the Vagans. He promises to bring evidence against them in their next meeting. Later, both Flit and Asemu get themselves in trouble against Zeheart and his special corps, the Magician 8, until Asemu receives a new upgrade to his mobile suit, assembling the Gundam AGE-2 Double Bullet to turn the tides on their favor. After the battle, Flit arrives to the meeting with Grodek just to find that he was murdered.
25	"The Terrifying Mu-szell"; Transliteration: "Kyōbu no Myūseru" (Japanese: 恐怖のミューセル)	April 1, 2012
Flit recovers a Vagan intact cockpit from their previous battle and Dique's team finds that its pilot was using a special helmet to artificially stimulate his X-Rounder abilities. Against orders, Asemu steals the helmet believing it would give him the chance to get on par with Zeheart's skills, but the side effects of wearing it in combat puts his life in danger.
26	"Earth, This is Eden"; Transliteration: "Chikyuu, Sore wa Eden" (Japanese: 地球、それはエデン)	April 8, 2012
The Vagans launch an attack on the Industrial colony of Nortram, planning to seize it and make use of its resources to spearhead their invasion of Earth, but once again the Federation Forces stand in their way, deploying their newest weapon against them. Decil once more disobeys Zehart's orders and leaves by himself seeking to confront Flit, but when he ends up against Asemu and Woolf together instead, tragedy strikes in both sides of the conflict.
27	"I Saw a Red Sunset"; Transliteration: "Akai Yuuhi wo Mita" (Japanese: 赤い夕陽を見た)	April 15, 2012
The battle for Nortram intensifies until the Vagans' main fortress is severely damaged and threatens to fall on Earth. To prevent that disaster strikes the planet, Asemu and Zeheart join forces on a suicide mission to destroy it from inside. Having fulfilled their duty, both pilots accept their imminent deaths and sort out their differences, until Zeheart is shown an escape route leading them to safety.
28	"Upheaval in the Earth Sphere"; Transliteration: "Chikyūken no Douran" (Japanese: 地球圏の動乱)	April 22, 2012
One year after the battle of Nortram, Flit makes use of the information he got from Grodek to expose the conspiration between the Earth Government and the Vagans to the public. With their plans uncovered, the Veigans launch an attack to kill the Earth Prime Minister, but Asemu stands in their way. Through a purge committee led by Flit Asuno, conspirators with the Veigan within the Earth Federation were executed for treason and the Earth Federation was reborn under new leadership. A couple of years later, Asemu marries Romary.

== Arc 3: Kio ==
No.	Title	Original release date
29	"Grandpa's Gundam"; Transliteration: "Jiichan no Gandamu" (Japanese: じいちゃんのガンダム)	April 29, 2012
Just after the birth of his son Kio, Asemu leaves for a special mission but never returns. On A.G. 164, the Vagans launch a large scale invasion on Earth that overruns the Federation Forces by surprise. Just when everything seems lost, Flit and Kio board the brand new Gundam AGE-3 to fight back.
30	"The City Became a Battlefield"; Transliteration: "Senjō ni Naru Machi" (Japanese: 戦場になる町)	May 6, 2012
Flit and Kio struggle to contain Zeheart and the Vagan offensive on their town Olivernotes. By Flit's request, the retired Diva is reinstated into duty and launched to assist them.
31	"Tremble in Fear - Ghosts of the Desert"; Transliteration: "Senritsu Sabaku no Bōrei" (Japanese: 戦慄 砂漠の亡霊)	May 13, 2012
The Diva flies at low altitude to avoid enemy detection while passing through a desert, when it is ambushed by the "Phantom 3", a Vagan special unit whose desert-oriented gear gives them the upper hand. Kio and the others struggle to keep the enemy at bay long enough for the Age Builder to complete their newest weapon, the G-Hopper, and dispatch it to assemble the Gundam AGE-3 Fortress.
32	"The Traitor"; Transliteration: "Uragirimono" (Japanese: 裏切り者)	May 20, 2012
On their way to the Federation base of Roustroulam, the crew of Diva learns that one of their pilots Shanalua Mullen is a spy working for the Vagans. Kio is ordered by his grandfather to help defend the base against the Vagans, but he decides to go after Shanalua instead, wondering about the reasons behind her treason.
33	"Howl to the Earth"; Transliteration: "Daichi ni Hoeru" (Japanese: 大地に吠える)	May 27, 2012
The Battle of Roustroulam continues, but when Flit and the others realize the Vagans' true intentions, they must race against time to disarm the bombs left behind by the enemy.
34	"Space Pirates Bisidian"; Transliteration: "Uchū Kaizoku Bishidian" (Japanese: 宇宙海賊ビシディアン)	June 3, 2012
The Diva reaches space in safety and sets course for the Federation base on the moon. On their way they are ambushed by the Bisidian Space Pirates led by Captain Ash, who is revealed to be none other than Asemu Asuno himself, piloting the Gundam AGE-2 Dark Hound. The situation changes when a Vagan squad join the battle, including the two remaining members of the Phantom 3, eager to enact revenge for their comrade's death.
35	"The Cursed Treasure"; Transliteration: "Norowa reshi hihō" (Japanese: 呪われし秘宝)	June 10, 2012
The crew of Diva takes heed of the message left behind by Asemu revealing the existence of EXA-DB, an ancient military database whose secrets can change the course of the war. Zeheart jonis fellow commander Zanald Beyhard in a pincer attack on the Diva, and to protect it from the enemy, Kio pilots the brand new Gundam AGE-3 Orbital.
36	"Stolen Gundam"; Transliteration: "Ubawareta Gandamu" (Japanese: 奪われたガンダム)	June 17, 2012
The Vagans flee the battlefield after capturing Kio, much to Flit's despair. The Diva is forced to make a stop at the Madorna Workshop for repairs and ressuply where Flit is contacted by Asemu, asking for him to let him and the Bisidians lead the mission to rescue Kio.
37	"The Vagan's World"; Transliteration: "Veigan no Sekai" (Japanese: ヴェイガンの世界)	June 24, 2012
At Vagan's central colony, the "Second Moon", Kio is brought before their leader Fezarl Ezelcant, who treats him more like a guest than a prisoner. Ezelcant has Kio explore the colony to learn about the harsh situation of its people while Zanald's crew have the Gundam AGE-3 analyzed as part of their plans to develop their own Gundam.
38	"Fugitive Kio"; Transliteration: "Tōbōsha Kio" (Japanese: 逃亡者キオ)	July 1, 2012
Kio cooperates with Ezelcant in exchange for medicine to his new friend Lu. He then spends his days at the Second Moon happily besides Lu and her brother Deen until Asemu and the Bisidian pirates infiltrate the colony to rescue him and retrieve the Gundam AGE-3.
39	"The Door to the New World"; Transliteration: "Shinsekai no Tobira" (Japanese: 新世界の扉)	July 8, 2012
Asemu and Kio's escape from the Vagans is halted by Ezelcant, piloting the recently completed Gundam Legilis and they find themselves surrounded by the enemy until the Bisidian pirates join the fight to assist them. During their fight, Ezelcant reveals to Kio the true nature of his master plan, the "Project Eden".

== Arc 4: Three Generations ==
No.	Title	Original release date
40	"Kio's Decision: Together with the Gundam"; Transliteration: "Kio no Ketsui: Gandamu to Tomoni" (Japanese: キオの決意 ガンダムと共に)	July 15, 2012
After a brief reunion with his family, Kio takes part in a mission to recapture the Federation Lunar base from the Vagans while determined to follow his will to protect everyone, regardless of side, piloting the AGE System's ultimate creation, the Gundam AGE-FX.
41	"Magnificent Fram"; Transliteration: "Karei na Furamu" (Japanese: 華麗なフラム)	July 22, 2012
The battle for the Lunar base intensifies as Zeheart and his aide Fram Nara set for the frontlines. Kio attempts to dissuade Fram without success and just when he finds himself in a pinch, Asemu joins the fight and confronts Zeheart about Ezelcant's true intentions.
42	"Girard Spriggan"; Transliteration: "Jirādo Supurigan" (Japanese: ジラード・スプリガン)	July 29, 2012
Kio's confront with Fram in interrupted by Girard Spriggan, a former member of the Earth Federation who switched sides. As Kio struggles against Girard, her past and the reasons for her defection are revealed and Flit joins the battle with his upgraded Gundam AGE-1 Glansa to assist him.
43	"Splendid! Triple Gundam"; Transliteration: "Souzetsu Toripuru Gandamu" (Japanese: 壮絶 トリプルガンダム)	August 5, 2012
The Federal Forces break the enemy's defense lines and infiltrate the Lunar base. While Seric Abis convinces the Vagans to admit defeat, Girard's X-Rounder powers go berserk and she starts attacking both allies and foes alike.
44	"Diverging Paths"; Transliteration: "Wakare Yuku Michi" (Japanese: 別れゆく道)	August 19, 2012
Having successfully taken over the Lunar Base, the Earth Federal Forces turn their attentions to La Gramis, the Vagan's main fortress. Kio and Asemu confront Flit about his obsession to take revenge on the entire Vagan race for all the friends and loved ones he lost during the war. Meanwhile, after revealing to Zeheart all the truth about Project Eden, Ezelcant nominates him his successor, entrusting him the Gundam Legilis.
45	"Sid the Destroyer"; Transliteration: "Hakaisha Shido" (Japanese: 破壊者シド)	August 26, 2012
Zeheart confronts the mobile armor Sid determined to master the full power of the Gundam Legilis and reclaim the EXA-DB. The Bisidian take heed of the battle and also launch an attack against Sid, but it proves more powerful than Asemu and Zeheart can handle until they end up joining forces to defeat it.
46	"Space Fortress La Gramis"; Transliteration: "Uchū Yōsai La Guramisu" (Japanese: 宇宙要塞 ラ・グラミス)	September 2, 2012
The final battle between the Earth Federation and the Vagans begins. Zeheart and Fram drive Kio into a corner, but he still refuses to activate the Gundam-FX's newest weapon, the FX Burst in because of his oath to not kill his enemies. Meanwhile, Ezelcant informs Zanald that he has chosen Zeheart to succeed him and asks to lend him his support, but Zanald has other plans.
47	"Life Scattered on the Blue Planet (Litt. Blue Star, Scattered Lives)"; Transliteration: "Aoi Hoshi Chiriyuku Inochi" (Japanese: 青い星 散りゆく命)	September 9, 2012
As the battle goes on, with casualties piling up on both sides, Kio is forced to confront his Vagan friend Deen. Kio manages to subdue Deen but when Deen is killed by Zanald in an attempt to shoot him down, Kio activates the FX Burst and launches himself furiously against Zanald. Meanwhile, Zeheart renews his resolve to win the war no matter the costs.
48	"The Glitter of Despair"; Transliteration: "Zetsubō no Kirameki" (Japanese: 絶望 の 煌めき)	September 16, 2012
In a desperate move do destroy both the Gundams and the Diva, Zeheart sends his most trusted allies in a suicide mission. However, Flit manages to see through this strategy and have all of Diva's personal evacuated before the Vagans fire their main weapon once more. Upon realizing that his plan has failed, costing the lives of many of his comrades, Zeheart boards the Legilis and launches himself against the Gundams.
49	"End of a Long Journey"; Transliteration: "Nagaki Tabi no Owari" (Japanese: 長き旅 の 終わり)	September 23, 2012
In a last effort to prevent defeat, the Vagans deploy their ultimate mobile suit, the Vagan Gear, piloted by Ezelcant's clone Zera Gins. While confronting the Gundams, the Vagan Gear is taken over by the SID and starts attacking friend and foe alike. After Kio convinces him to give up on his ambition of destroying the Vagans, Flit rallies both the Federation and Vagan soldiers to join forces, and work together to stop the Vagan Gear and save the Second Moon from being destroyed.
