= Ferre Grignard =

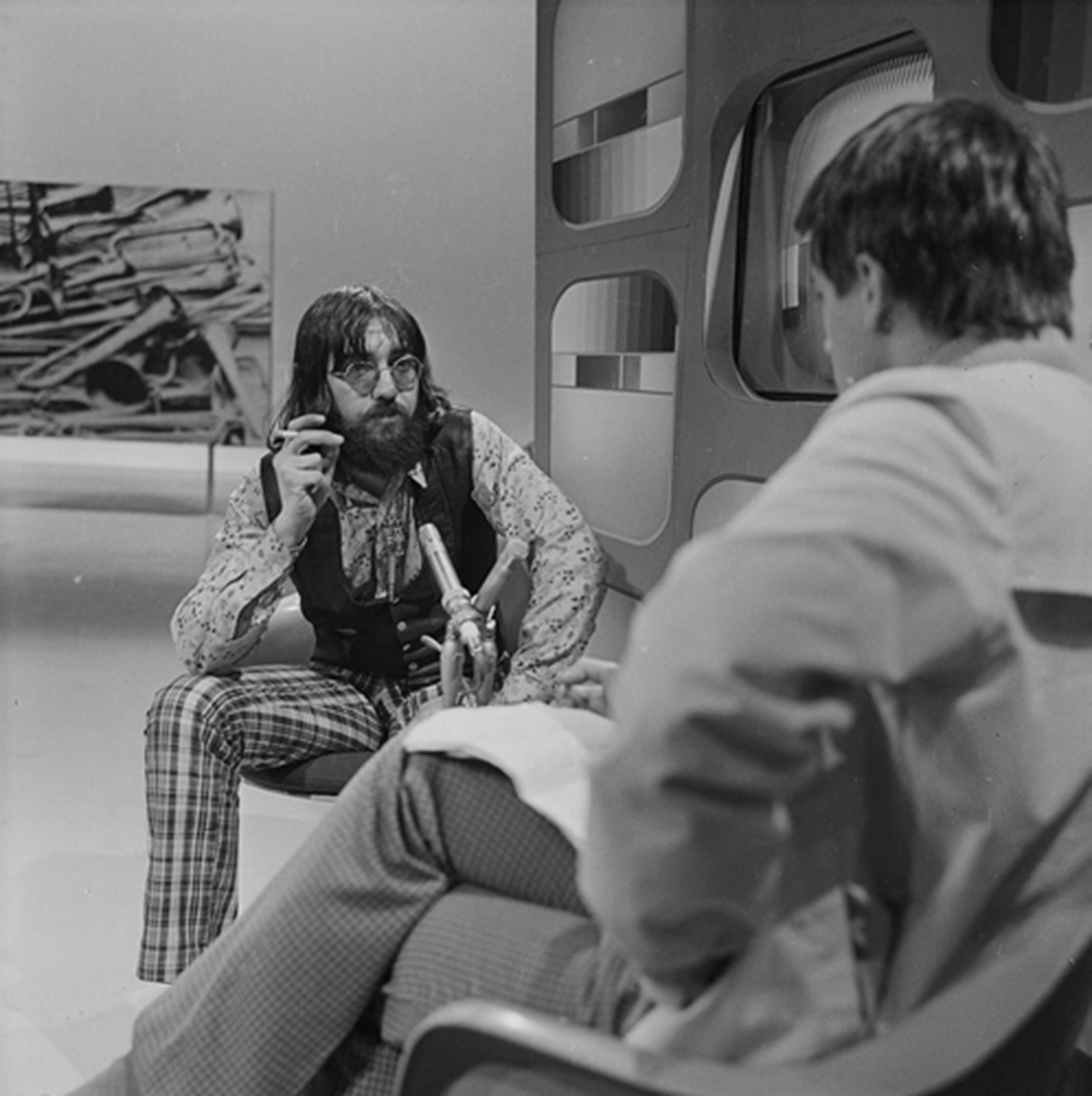
- Grignard (1966)

Background information
- Born: Fernand Grignard; 13 March 1939; Antwerp, Belgium
- Origin: 'The Muze', Antwerp
- Died: 8 August 1982 (aged 43) Antwerp
- Genres: Blues, skiffle, folk
- Occupations: Singer-songwriter, painter
- Instrument: Guitar
- Years active: 1958–1980
- Labels: Fontana, Philips, Barclay, Major Minor, Disques Motors

Ferre Grignard (13 March 1939 – 8 August 1982) was a Belgian skiffle-singer from Antwerp, Belgium. He had success with a number of songs, such as "Ring Ring, I've Got To Sing", "Yama, Yama, Hey", and "My Crucified Jesus".

== Biography ==
Ferre Grignard was born in Antwerp in 1939. He learned to play the harmonica and guitar when he was young. At the end of the 1950s, he went to an Antwerp art academy where he formed a skiffle group. He was unsuccessful as a painter, but he could play the guitar and sing the blues and his performances in "De Muze", an Antwerp jazz café, made him well known in the Antwerp artists' world. He went to the United States for a time but was expelled for being an anarchist.

The young generation accepted him as the first Belgian protest singer, because of his hippie-like appearance and the content of his songs. In 1965 he performed at the first "Jazz-festival" at Bilzen. He was discovered by Hans Kusters (who owned the record company HKM). His first single "Ring Ring, I've Got to Sing" was released and charted in Belgium and the Netherlands. Other songs such as "Yama, Yama, Hey", "Drunken Sailor", "My Crucified Jesus" also charted with their mixture of skiffle, folk music and blues. At the height of his career he performed at the Paris Olympia. The Belgian artist George Smits was a member of Ferre Grignard's band around that time.

After the ensuing international success, things started to go wrong. He went to live in a mansion, where he made music, painted and partied with the 20 friends who lived with him. He also refused to fill in his tax-forms, so he was ordered to pay the taxes and large part of the royalties from his music went directly to taxes. He neglected his career and was soon forgotten by his fans. A comeback in the 1970s failed.

He died in Antwerp of throat cancer in 1982. At that time he was living in an attic without heating, surrounded by empty bottles. Grignard was buried at the Schoonselhof cemetery, among many of Antwerp's most notable citizens.

== Discography ==
Albums
Year	Title	Label	Cat. No.
1966	Ring, Ring, I've Got To Sing	Fontana	858 088 FPY
1968	Ferre Grignard	Philips	12837
1969	Captain Disaster	Barclay	920 117
1972	Fērrē Grignard	Disques Motors	MT 44011
1978	I Warned You!	Philips	6320 042

Compilation albums
Year	Title	Label	Cat. No
1991	The Best of Ferre Grignard	Philips	845 5442
1997	Het beste van Ferre Grignard	Polygram	536 0332
2002	Lost Tracks	Nijgh & Van Ditmar	21311
2014	Integraal	Universal	4702435

Singles
Date	A-side	B-side	Label	Cat. No.	Album
1965	"Ring Ring, I've Got To Sing"	"Maureen"	De Muze	S 50116	Non-album Single
Mar 1966	"Ring, Ring, I've Got To Sing"	"We Want War"	Philips	319 870 BF	Ring, Ring, I've Got To Sing
Jul 1966	"She's Gone"	"My Crucified Jesus"	Philips	319 875 BF	Ring, Ring, I've Got To Sing
Oct 1966	"Hash Bamboo Shuffle 1702"	"Drunken Sailor"	Philips	319 880 BF	Ring, Ring, I've Got To Sing
Jan 1967	"A Worried Man"	"Maureen"	Philips	319 892 BF	Ring, Ring, I've Got To Sing
Sep 1967	"La, Si, Do"	"Yellow You, Yellow Me"	Barclay	60 847	Non-album singles
Nov 1967	"Close Your Nose… If"	"Old Joe Clark"	Barclay	60 868	Non-album singles
Aug 1968	"Captain Disaster"	"Tell Me Now"	Barclay	60 956	Captain Disaster
Apr 1969	"Yama, Yama, Hey"	"I Won't Have A Dance"	Barclay	BE 61044	Captain Disaster
Aug 1971	"Railroad Bill"	"Maybe Tomorrow"	Disques Motors	MT 4010	Non-album Single
May 1972	"Lazy John"	"She's Back"	Disques Motors	MT 4022	Fērrē Grignard
Dec 1973	"Knockin' Me Down"	"When I'm Down"	Philips	6021 098	Non-album Single
Mar 1978	"I Warned You"	"All Right"	Philips	6021 195	I Warned You!

EPs
Year	Title	A-side	B-side	Label	Cat. No	Album
1966	Ring, Ring, I've Got To Sing	1 – "Ring, Ring, I've Got To Sing"; 2 – "We Want War"	1 – "My Crucified Jesus"; 2 – "She's Gone"	Philips	434.330 BE	Ring, Ring, I’ve Got To Sing
1966	Hash Bamboo Shuffle 1702	1 – "Hash Bamboo Shuffle 1702"; 2 – "The Zoo"	1 – "Diggin' My Potatoes"; 2 – "Drunken Sailor"	Philips	434.337 BE	Ring, Ring, I’ve Got To Sing
1968	La, Si, Do	1 – "Yellow You, Yellow Me"; 2 – "Close Your Nose… If"	1 – "La, Si, Do 25"; 2 – "Old Joe Clark"	Barclay	71 199	Non-album EP
