= Ringtone (disambiguation) =

A ringtone or ring tone is the sound made by a telephone to indicate an incoming call or text message.

Ringtone may also refer to:

- Ringtone (film), a 2010 Malayalam film
- "Ringtone", a song by 100 gecs from their album 1000 Gecs
  - "Ringtone" (remix), a remix of the song, featuring Charli XCX, Rico Nasty and Kero Kero Bonito
- "Ringtone", a song "Weird Al" Yankovic from his EP Internet Leaks
- "The Ringtone", an episode of the television show Spooky Nights
