= Flying circus (disambiguation) =

A flying circus is a barnstorming troupe (a flying exhibition team).

Flying circus or Flying Circus may also refer to:

- The Flying Circus, a German World War I air wing led by Baron von Richthofen
- Cobham's Flying Circus, an English flying circus (barnstorming group) started by Alan Cobham in 1932
- Flying Circus, an American World War II air corps led by Joe Foss
- Pussy Galore's Flying Circus in James Bond movie Goldfinger
- The Flying Circus (Canada), a short-lived Canadian folk rock band (1967–1968)
- The Flying Circus (band), an Australian country rock/pop band (1968–74)
- Flying Circus (film), 1968 Looney Tunes animated cartoon
- Flying Circus (wargame), a Board wargame, 1972
- Monty Python's Flying Circus, a British television sketch comedy originally broadcast 1969–1974
- The Flying Circus of Physics, a collection of physics problems by Jearl Walker first published in 1975
- Circo Voador, in Portuguese, a concert venue in Rio de Janeiro

== See also ==
- Jagdgeschwader 1 (World War I), a German World War I fighter wing, commanded at one point by Manfred von Richthofen (the "Red Baron")
