= War of the Ring (disambiguation) =

The War of the Ring is a fictitious military conflict in J. R. R. Tolkien's The Lord of the Rings.

War of the Ring may also refer to:

- The History of The Lord of the Rings also known as The War of the Ring, part of The History of Middle-earth book series by Christopher Tolkien
- The War of the Ring online campaign, a Games Workshop Online Community worldwide campaign
- War of the Ring (SPI game), a 1977 strategy board game
- War of the Ring (board game), a 2004 strategy board game
- The Lord of the Rings: War of the Ring, a computer game
- War of the Ring, a variant of the Middle-earth Strategy Battle Game by Games Workshop
