= Circus Maximus (disambiguation) =

Circus Maximus is an ancient arena and mass entertainment venue located in Rome.

Circus Maximus may also refer to:

== Music ==
- Circus Maximus (American band), a 1960s band featuring Jerry Jeff Walker
- Circus Maximus (Norwegian band), a 2000s progressive metal band
- The Circus Maximus, a 1992 album by Manilla Road
- Circus Maximus (Momus album), 1986
- Symphony No. 3 (Corigliano) or Symphony No. 3, Circus Maximus, a piece for large wind band by American composer John Corigliano
- "Circus Maximus" (song), a 2023 song by Travis Scott featuring the Weeknd and Swae Lee
- "Circus Maximus", a 2005 song by the band Clutch from the album Robot Hive/Exodus
- "Circus Maximus Tour," a 2023-24 tour by artist Travis Scott

== Other ==
- Circus Maximus (film), a 2023 film directed by and starring Travis Scott
- Circus Maximus (game), a chariot-racing board game
- Circus Maximus (horse) (born 2016), winner of the 2019 St James's Palace Stakes
- Circo Massimo (Rome Metro), a station of the Rome Metro
- Circus Maximus: Chariot Wars, a 2002 video game
