= Great Ring (disambiguation) =

Great Ring or variation, may refer to:

== J. R. R. Tolkien's legendarium ==
- Any of the fictional Rings of Power
  - The One Ring, also known as the Great Ring

== Other arts and entertainment ==
- The Great Ring of Arakko, a government body in the Marvel Comics universe
- Velikoye Koltso Award (Russian: Great Ring Award), part of the Aelita Prize for Russian science fiction writers
- Great Ring, a circle dance, that was once part of the Cotillion

== Places ==
- Great Ring Canal, River Thames, England, UK; a canal ring

=== Roads ===
- A ring road
- Great Ring Road, Budapest, Hungary; a ring road
- Great Ring Road (Kyiv), Ukraine; a ring road
- Grande Raccordo Anulare (GRA; Italian: Great Ring Spur Route; English: Great Ring Road), Rome, Italy; a ring road

== Other uses ==
- Kinki Great Ring, a Japanese baseball team (now called the Fukuoka SoftBank Hawks)
- Henge, a Neolithic structure
  - stone circle

== See also ==
- Ring (disambiguation)
- Great (disambiguation)
- Big ring (disambiguation)
