= Ring 2 (disambiguation) =

Ring 2 is a 1999 Japanese horror film.

Ring 2 may also refer to:

== Roads ==
- Ring II, in Finland
- Ring 2 (Aarhus), in Denmark
- Ring 2 (Copenhagen), in Denmark
- Ring 2 (Oslo), in Norway

== Other uses ==
- The Ring Two, a 2005 American horror film
- Ring 2 (computer security)

== See also ==
- Spiral (Suzuki novel), the second Ring novel
- Two rings (disambiguation)
- Ring Ring (disambiguation)
- Ring (disambiguation)
