= Circus (American band) =

American power pop band

- Circus

Background information
- Origin: Cleveland, Ohio
- Genres: Power pop, soft rock
- Years active: 1970–1975
- Labels: RCA; Metromedia
- Past members: Mick Sabol; Phil Alexander; Tommy Dobeck; Frank Salle; Dan Hrdlicka; Craig Balzer; Bruce Balzer/

Circus was a Cleveland, Ohio-based power pop band active in the early- and mid-1970s. Their lone, self-titled album was released in 1973, and their single "Stop Wait & Listen" debuted at #91 on the Billboard Hot 100 charts on March 17 of that year.

== Former members ==
- Mick Sabol - Guitars, vocals
- Phil Alexander - Vocals, keyboards
- Tommy Dobeck - Drums
- Frank Salle - Bass guitar
- Dan Hrdlicka - Guitars, vocals (1970-1973)
- Craig Balzer - Guitars, vocals (1973-1975)
- Bruce Balzer - Guitars, vocals (1973-1975)
