= Ring Ring, I've Got to Sing =

1966 single by Ferre Grignard

- European 1966 7" vinyl single cover

Single by Ferre Grignard

from the album Ring, Ring, I've Got to Sing
- B-side: "We Want War"
- Released: 1966
- Recorded: September 16, 1965
- Label: Philips
- Songwriter(s): Ferre Grignard

"Ring, Ring I've Got to Sing" is a 1966 protest song composed and performed by Ferre Grignard. It became an international hit. The song criticizes racism and war through an African-American who doesn't want to fight for his country, because of the way black people are treated in the United States.

== History ==
After an unsuccessful career as an artist, Ferre Grignard had learned to play the guitar and sing the blues. In 1964, De Muze opened in Antwerp. It was a bar often frequented by people with an alternative lifestyle. Ferre Grignard often performed there, and "Ring, Ring I've Got to Sing" was greatly appreciated. In 1965, the owner invited him to record the song. Not long thereafter Hans Kusters, a music producer who also owned a record company, heard the song and asked Ferre Grignard to record it once again. In 1966 this version, distributed on 500 copies, became a hit, and because of its mixture of skiffle, folk and blues, Grignard's first album Ring, Ring I've Got to Sing scored high on the European charts.

The song was re-issued many times, and it appeared in numerous compilations. In 2007, the song was inducted into the Flemish Hall of Fame of pop music. "Ring Ring, I've Got to Sing" is still present on many Belgian all-time top hit charts.

== Charts ==
Chart (1966)	Peak position
Belgium (Ultratop 50 Flanders)	10
Belgium (Ultratop 50 Wallonia)	28
Netherlands (Dutch Top 40)	16
Netherlands (Single Top 100)	15
