= Circus Circus =

Circus Circus is a brand of casino hotels. It was formerly owned by Mandalay Resort Group (formerly Circus Circus Enterprises). The name may refer to:

- Circus Circus Las Vegas, owned by Phil Ruffin
- Circus Circus Reno, owned and operated by Caesars Entertainment
- Gold Strike Tunica in Mississippi, formerly Circus Circus Tunica
- Circus Circus Atlantic City, a defunct hotel and casino project, Atlantic City, New Jersey
