= Ring Road (disambiguation) =

A ring road is a road that encircles a town, city or country. The article includes examples of ring roads.

Ring Road may also refer to:

== Roads ==
- List of ring roads

== Arts and entertainment ==
- Ring Road (film), a 2015 Indian Kannada-language film
- Ring Road (EP), a 2020 EP by American indie rock band Dirty Projectors
- "Ring Road" (song), by Underworld, 2008
- "Ring Roadu", a song by Hemachandra, Geetha Madhuri and Koti from the 2011 Indian film Katha Screenplay Darsakatvam Appalaraju
- Ring Roads, a translation of Les Boulevards de ceinture, a 1972 novel by Patrick Modiano

== Other uses ==
- Ring languages, or Ring Road languages, in Cameroon
