= Ring =

Ring(s) most often refers to:

- Ring (jewellery), a round band, usually made of metal, worn as ornamental jewelry
- To make a sound with a bell, and the sound made by a bell

(The) Ring(s) may also refer to:

== Arts, entertainment, and media ==
=== Film and TV ===
- The Ring (franchise), a Japanese horror media franchise based on the novel series by Koji Suzuki
  - Ring (film), or The Ring, a 1998 Japanese horror film by Hideo Nakata
    - The Ring (2002 film), an American horror film, remake of the 1998 Japanese film
  - Ring (1995 film), a TV film
  - Rings (2005 film), a short film by Jonathan Liebesman
  - Rings (2017 film), an American horror film
- "Ring", a season 3 episode of Servant (TV series)

=== Gaming ===
- Ring (video game), 1998
- The Ring: Terror's Realm, a 2000 video game, also known simply as Ring
- Rings (Sonic the Hedgehog), a collectible in Sonic the Hedgehog games

=== Literature ===
- Ring (Baxter novel), a 1994 science fiction novel
- Ring (Alexis novel), a 2021 Canadian novel by André Alexis
- Ring (novel series), a Japanese novel series by Koji Suzuki
  - Ring (Suzuki novel), 1991

=== Music ===
==== Albums ====
- Ring (The Connells album), 1993
- Ring (Gary Burton album), 1974
- Ring (Glasser album), 2010
- Ring (Miliyah Kato album), 2009
- Ring (R album), 2020
- "Ring" (White Reaper song), 2019

==== Songs ====
- "Ring" (B'z song), 2000
- "Ring" (Cardi B song), 2018
- "Ring", by Phoebe Ryan, 2020
- "Ring" (Selena Gomez song), 2020
- "Ring" (T.I. song), 2020
- "Rings" (song), 1971, covered by Lonnie Mack, Cymarron, Tompall & the Glaser Brothers, and others
- "Rings" (Aesop Rock song), 2016

==== Other uses in music ====
- Ring (rock band), a 1980s British band
- Der Ring des Nibelungen, Wagner's epic "Ring cycle"

== People ==
- Ring (surname), including a list of people with the name
- Ring of Sweden, a Swedish monarch or local ruler c. 936
- Frances Rings, Australian dancer and choreographer

== Places ==
- Ring, County Waterford, Ireland
- Ring, Wisconsin, US

== Mathematics ==
- Annulus (mathematics), a geometric planar ring
- Ring (mathematics), an algebraic structure
- Ring of sets, a family of subsets closed under certain operations

== Computers and electronics ==
- Protection ring, in computer security
- Ring (data structure), or ring buffer
- Ring (software), former name of VOIP Jami
- Ring circuit, an electrical wiring technique
- Ring network, a network topology

== Science ==
- Ring (chemistry), a cyclic molecule
- Ring system, in astronomy, matter orbiting a planet or other stellar body
- Annulus (mycology), or ring, on the stipe of mushrooms
- Ring attached to a bird by bird ringing, for identification

== Sports ==
=== Apparatus ===
- Juggling ring, a popular prop used by jugglers
- Ringette, a stick sport game using a ring
- Rings (gymnastics), a gymnastics apparatus and its associated event

=== Places ===
- Boxing ring, the space in which a boxing match occurs
- Wrestling ring, the stage on which a professional wrestling match usually occurs
- Fighting Network Rings, or RINGS, a Japanese combat sport promotion

== Other uses ==
- Crime ring, or ring, in organized crime
- Ring (Bulgaria), a Bulgarian sports TV channel
- Ring (company), a home-security company, maker of the Ring video doorbell
- Ring (diacritic), which may appear above or below letters
- Ring, a bidders' pool for collusion in an auction
- Ring, a local club of the International Brotherhood of Magicians
- Ring, a perception of sound caused by tinnitus
- Ring languages, spoken in Cameroon
- Ring road, a type of highway encircling a town or city

== See also ==
- Ring King, arcade boxing game
- Ring of Solomon
- Ringe (disambiguation)
- Ringer (disambiguation)
- Ringette, winter team sport played on an ice rink
- Ringing (disambiguation)
- Ringo (disambiguation)
- Ringtone (disambiguation)
- The Ring (disambiguation)
- Ring 0 (disambiguation)
- Ring 1 (disambiguation)
- Ring 2 (disambiguation)
- Ring 3 (disambiguation)
- Ring 4 (disambiguation)
- Ring 5 (disambiguation)
- Ring of Honor (disambiguation)
- Ring Ring (disambiguation)
- Ring Ring Ring (disambiguation)
- Ring Road (disambiguation)
- Ring structure (disambiguation)
- Annulus (disambiguation)
- Brass ring, a grabbable ring on a carousel
- Cock ring, a ring worn around the penis
- Circle symbol (disambiguation)
- Coffee ring effect
- Napkin ring problem, on the volume left after drilling a cylindrical hole through a sphere
- Piston ring, part of an engine
- Power ring (disambiguation)
- Ring of bells, a set of bells hung for English full circle ringing
- Storage ring, a type of particle accelerator
- The Lord of the Rings (disambiguation)
- Torus, a doughnut shape
- War of the Ring (disambiguation)
