= Two Ring Circus =

Two Ring Circus may refer to:

- The Two Ring Circus, a 1987 remix album by Erasure
- "Two Ring Circus", a 1974 song by Peggy Sue
- "Two Ring Circus", a 1996 TV episode of Ellen

== See also ==
- Circus
