= George Smits =

Belgian visual artist (1944–1997)

George Smits (Antwerp, 1944–1997), a.k.a. 'Toet', was a Belgian visual artist, comics artist, radio presenter, experimental musician and inventor of experimental musical instruments.

== Biography ==
In the sixties, he was a member of the band of Ferre Grignard. Smits was also active as an actor in a few movies, and was part of Antwerp's underground arts scene (e.g. the Ercola collective and also part of Fred Bervoets band and Panamarenko). Besides his musical career, he was active as a painter, comics artist and an experimental musician with his own radio show on the Belgian public radio Radio Centraal. This radio show, broadcast at night, gave Smits the motivation to increasingly focus on creating music (leaving some of his paintings unfinished), using instruments he had invented himself as well as effects, but also, gradually, new electronic tools. Smith prepared his radio show very precisely, spending about 20 hours recording sounds in advance of the broadcast. On his program, he used the pseudonym Captain Zbolk.

George Smits is mostly known for his self-created musical instruments. Many of Smits' instruments are acoustic and made with polystyrene, large springs and long strings.

== Discography ==
- Zbolk Night Radio, (1997, Audioview/Lowlands AUDIO-002, 70'01")
- Toet (Audioview/Lowlands Distribution)
