= List of Ring characters =

This article lists the characters who have appeared in the Japanese Ring films, based on a series of novels written by Koji Suzuki. The series is made up of Ring, Spiral, Ring 2, Ring 0: Birthday and Sadako 3D. The films have also been adapted into the Korean film The Ring Virus, and the American series The Ring, Rings (2005), The Ring Two and Rings (2017). In television the first novel has been adapted into the television film Ring: Kanzenban as well as Ring: The Final Chapter a 12-episode television series. A follow-up series, Rasen, was also produced.

The books and films revolve around a mysterious video cassette that is said to curse those who watch it so that they will die within a week of viewing. The main characters discover this to be true and must solve the videotape's origins to save themselves and other characters from the deadly curse.

== Main characters ==
=== Kazuyuki Asakawa ===
Kazuyuki Asakawa (浅川 和行, Asakawa Kazuyuki) is the lead character in the first novel of the series, Ring. He has two older brothers: Junichi, who works in a publishing company, and another one who works as a high school teacher. Kazuyuki is married to Shizuka Oda and they have a one-year-old daughter named Yoko. His best friend is Ryuji Takayama, a college professor and alleged rapist. After his wife's niece Tomoko dies and he comes across another boy who died on the same day on his motorbike, Asakawa tries to find out why, which then links him to the cursed videotape. After watching it, he is left with just seven days to figure out how to break the curse. While Kazuyuki manages to escape the curse by showing Ryuji with a copy of the videotape, as revealed in Spiral, his daughter and wife do not despite having done the same, as the virus which causes the curse mutated when Kazuyuki copied the tape for Ryuji. In his panic, Kazuyuki experiences a car accident which leaves him catatonic. Ando attempts to interview him about the virus, but he remains mute. Several weeks later, Kazuyuki passes away in his sleep. It is later revealed that the virus spared Kazuyuki because he unwittingly helped it spread; Kazuyuki's journal chronicling his investigation on Sadako is printed by Junichi into a book published nationally.

In Ring: Kanzenban (1995), Asakawa is played by Katsunori Takahashi with little difference except for an unborn child rather than a one-year-old daughter. In the 1999 television series, Ring: The Final Chapter, he is played by Toshirō Yanagiba. In this incarnation, he is a widower with a young son, Yoichi, while Ryuji is not a friend of his and it is not speculated that the two have previously known each other. In the film series, Kazuyuki's role is played by Reiko Asakawa (浅川 玲子, Asakawa Reiko). Other than the gender change and her relationship with Ryuji, who is now Reiko's ex-husband and the father of Yoichi, Reiko is otherwise unchanged from Kazuyuki's persona. The producers opted for this because they felt a woman would have more appeal to box office audience.

In Ring 2, after the death of his father, Yoichi has started to become more and more like Sadako and is unable to speak. Reiko and Yoichi go into hiding from the authorities but are tracked down by Mai Takano, one of Ryuji's students, and she promises to help Reiko solve the problem with Yoichi. However, when another person dies from the curse of the videotape, Mai tells the police about Reiko and they arrest her. Scientists plan to do tests on Yoichi to test his level of ESP. Yoichi cries out to Reiko in a panic. When the policemen call Yoichi a "monster", Yoichi launches a physic attack on two doctors. The police chase the two of them and they try to escape. While trying to cross a road, Reiko falls into one of her terrible visions; her father telling her that Yoichi is not himself anymore. She did not have enough time to escape; she is hit by a truck and is killed. The shock of seeing his mother killed prompts Yoichi to nearly kill one of the policemen. It appears that Reiko's spirit is watching him still and Yoichi is saved from Sadako by the spirit of his father Ryuji.

In Spiral, after she and Yoichi turn up dead following a car crash, her superior Yoshino finds both the videotape and Reiko's diary in her car. Following Reiko's death, many people begin to die after a week as they did after watching the video. While the hero, Andou, thinks that it is the video causing the deaths, he discovers that none of them watched the video tape. At the end of the film, it turns out that it is Reiko's diary; she and Ryuji were helping Sadako all along. Consequently, the reincarnation of Ryuji takes the diary with the intention of publishing it to spread the curse even further.

In the BBC radio drama adaptation, Fright Night: Ring, broadcast in 2015, Kazayuki's name is altered to Mitchell Hooper and is depicted as a British expatriate living in Japan rather than a Japanese citizen by birth. He is voiced by Matthew Gravelle.

=== Ryuji Takayama ===
Ryuji Takayama (高山 竜司, Takayama Ryūji) is a major character in the series, first appearing in Ring. In Ring, Ryūji Takayama is a strange man with a dark sense of humor, who as such claims to be an occasional rapist and seems to fear nothing. As soon as Asakawa explains the story, Ryuji believes him, and wants nothing other than to see the cursed videotape. Asakawa shows it to him, and although Ryuji remains nonchalant, he agrees there is a powerful aura around the tape. He asks Asakawa to make him a copy to study at home, which Asakawa does. By the end, he and Asakawa believe they have solved the mystery surrounding the series' central character, Sadako Yamamura; the following day, however, Sadako's malignant spirit emerges from the tape and kills him. In Spiral a former medical school classmate, Ando, performs the autopsy on Ryuji. He discovers a bit of newspaper sticking out of Ryuji's stomach sutures, with two sets of numbers on it: "178" and "136". Later on, it is traced to a code, utilizing a sequence of Ryuji's DNA. The message contained was "mutation". Ando later discovers that Ryuji decided to join forces with Sadako, and is blackmailed by Sadako into bringing Ryuji back to life. Sadako and Ryuji then plot to spread the virus throughout the world using the diary of his dead friend, Asakawa.

In Loop, protagonist Kaoru Futami (二見 馨, Futami Kaoru) discovers that he is actually a clone of Ryuji, who realized he was living in an artificial world right before his death and asked the outside world to help him escape. Kaoru realizes that he is the cure to the virus that afflicts his girlfriend, Reiko, and is implanted into the Loop; in order to obtain the cure to the virus to save his girlfriend, he has to die. When in the Loop, Kaoru is reborn through Sadako instead of Ryuji, and Kaoru from then on lives under the name of Ryuji Takayama. After six months of research, Kaoru/Ryuji creates a vaccine for the Ring virus, a sample of which he gives to Ando. The vaccine is then mass-produced, neutralizing the effects of the Ring virus. He also creates a virus designed to accelerate the Sadako clones' aging rate and kill them, ridding the Loop of Sadako Yamamura forever. However, the virus also affects Ryuji, and he eventually dies his second death. His last thoughts are of Reiko and her face.

In the novel S, set twenty-five years after the events of Spiral, Ryuji is revealed to be the real identity of Seiji Kashiwada (柏田 誠二, Kashiwada Seiji), an apparent serial killer who murdered four girls and made an attempt on Akane Maruyama's life. Ryuji tells Takanori and Akane that he had impersonated the real Kashiwada in his attempt to apprehend Hiroyuki Niimura, his student and a fundamentalist who wanted to rid the world of Sadako clones for good, targeting four clones whom Ryuji spared because he thought that they posed no danger. He failed in saving them all, but managed to save Akane when Niimura attempted to kill her. However, this ended up implicating the real Kashiwada, who was subsequently captured and executed by the authorities. Ryuji then reveals that he is Akane's biological father, fathering her with Masako Maruyama, the Sadako clone born from Mai Takano's womb. He then bids them farewell before leaving Loop, attempting to reach the real world once more.

In the film series, Ryuji is portrayed by Hiroyuki Sanada. In the films, Ryuji is shown to have a more somber and reserved personality, with no implication of being a rapist like in the novel. He is also the ex-husband of protagonist Reiko Asakawa, the gender-flipped version of Kazuyuki, Ryuji's best friend in the novel. Ryuji also possesses ESP powers similar to Sadako which he passes down to his family. Yoshio Harada portrays him in Ring: Kanzenban, while Tomoya Nagase portrays him in Ring: The Final Chapter. Seiji Kashiwada, Ryuji's fake identity, is played by Yusuke Yamamoto in the adaptations of S, Sadako 3D and Sadako 3D 2, but this version of Kashiwada is not connected to Ryuji, instead a person whom Sadako uses in aid of her revival. In the television series, Ryuji is instead a sociopathic occultist who is revealed to be the son of Sadako having been passed on her powers. His relationship with Asakawa is not close but rather exists for the purpose of solving the curse of the videotape.

Ryuji's counterpart in the American film series is Noah Clay, portrayed by Martin Henderson, while in the Korean version, his counterpart is Dr. Choi Yeol.

In the BBC radio drama adaptation Ryuji is voiced by Akira Koieyama.

=== Mitsuo Ando ===
Mitsuo Ando (安藤 満男, Andō Mitsuo) is the protagonist of the second novel, Spiral. A forensics doctor and autopsy surgeon, Ando was friends with Ryuji Takayama in medical school before he turned to mathematics and has to perform an autopsy on his body. His young son, Takanori, drowned while swimming with him and his wife filed for divorce afterward. Ando and Ryuji's student Mai Takano destroy the original tape after he watches it to end Sadako's curse for good. It is later revealed that both are manipulated by Ryuji, who is working with Sadako to ensure his survival; in return, he will help resurrect her. Ando is forced to agree to spread the curse as he already has sex with Sadako, causing the dormant Ring virus to infect his body; in exchange, Sadako will resurrect Ando's son. Disgusted at Ryuji, who ostensibly worked with Sadako, Ando keeps a distance from both and does not participate in the search for the cure to the virus, electing to live a quiet life with his family. He reconciles with his wife and conceives a daughter, Takanori's younger sister. Ando has a small supporting role in S, which stars Takanori as the protagonist. When Takanori asks him about the virus and his suspicions regarding his resurrection, Ando vehemently refuses to answer, forcing Takanori to seek others' help.

In the film adaptation of Spiral, Ando is played by Kōichi Satō.

=== Takanori Ando ===
Takanori Ando (安藤 孝則, Andō Takanori) is the protagonist of the fifth novel of the series, S. He is the eldest son of Mitsuo, a forensics doctor and protagonist of the novel Spiral. Takanori once died drowned that led to Mitsuo becoming almost suicidal. As part of the agreement to help Sadako spread the Ring virus, she promises Mitsuo that she will resurrect Takanori through her womb. Fast forward to twenty five years later, the 28-year-old Takanori is now an image processing specialist who works at a CG company. He is also in a relationship with Akane Maruyama, who is pregnant with his child. After being handed a USB drive by his boss, he notices a video of a man named Seiji Kashiwada who killed himself. His investigations suck him into the cases that his father once delved into, revolving around the ring virus and Sadako Yamamura, the person responsible for his means to live. Takanori also finds out that Akane is related to the case as much as he is, being the daughter of Ryuji Takayama and a Sadako clone. Eventually, regardless of the situations they went through, the couple make up their minds to continue living together.

In the film series, Takanori is portrayed by Ryuichi Sugahara in Spiral and Kōji Seto in Sadako 3D and Sadako 3D 2. Unlike in the novel S, which has him as the protagonist, he is only a supporting character in the novel's adaptations, although he still played major roles; the role of protagonists are instead given to his girlfriend, Akane, and his younger sister, Fuko, in Sadako 3D and Sadako 3D 2, respectively.

=== Sadako Yamamura ===
Sadako Yamamura (山村 貞子, Yamamura Sadako) is the primary antagonist in most novels in the series. Sadako was born intersex (she has the body of a woman but possesses a male and female genitalia) and is a powerful psychic. In the novels, she is the daughter of Shizuko Yamamura, a fellow psychic, and Heihachiro Ikuma, a professor who was married to another woman, making her a bastard child. Despite this, she was raised in a loving household, until an incident during Shizuko's demonstration which eventually led Shizuko to take her life and Ikuma to develop tuberculosis, abandoning Sadako to the care of Shizuko's relatives in her hometown of Izu Ōshima. As a teenager, she moved to the mainland to become an actress, but her hopes were dashed when she was implicated in the death of her theater director, forcing her to become a recluse caring for her ill father in a TB ward in the Izu Peninsula. It was there that she was raped by Jotaro Nagao, who then threw her down a well upon finding out that she was intersex. Because Nagao was sick with smallpox when he raped her, Sadako was infected by the smallpox virus, which mated with Sadako's inherent psychic powers to project her hate against the world onto a television screen that records a videotape, creating the infamous cursed tape.

In the film series, Sadako is not hermaphrodite but fully female, and Ikuma is not her biological father but rather a man who took care of Shizuko when she became sick. She is portrayed by Ayane Miura in Ring: Kanzenban, Rie Inō in Ring and Ring 2, Hinako Saeki in Spiral, Yukie Nakama in Ring 0: Birthday, Tae Kimura in the TV series Ring: The Final Chapter and Rasen, and Ai Hashimoto in Sadako 3D and Sadako 3D 2.

Sadako has counterparts in remakes from other countries. In the American film series, Sadako's counterpart is Samara Morgan, played by Daveigh Chase in The Ring, Kelly Stables in The Ring Two and Bonnie Morgan in Rings (2017), while in the Korean version, her counterpart is Park Eun-Suh, played by actress Bae Doona.

In the BBC radio drama adaptation, Sadako is voiced by Naoko Mori.

== Supporting characters ==
=== Toru Amano ===
Toru Amano (天野 徹, Amano Tōru) is a microbiologist who worked for the Loop project before it was ultimately scrapped because of the mutation of the MHC virus. In Loop, he explains to Kaoru Futami the origins of the Loop project and helps him find a cure for the virus.

=== Shizuka and Yoko Asakawa ===
Shizuka (静) and Yoko Asakawa (浅川 陽子, Asakawa Yōko) are Kazuyuki Asakawa's wife and daughter, respectively. Yoko is one and a half year old as of the events of Ring. Shizuka's maiden name is Oda (小田) and she is one of the three daughters born to Toru (徹, Tōru) and Setsuko Oda (小田 節子, Oda Setsuko), who live in Ashikaga. Her sisters are Yoshimi (良美), who has a daughter named Tomoko, and Kazuko (紀子), who has a son named Kenichi. Tomoko is one of the first victims of the cursed tape and the similarity of her case with three other people piques Kazuyuki's interest into the case. Shizuka and Yoko become directly involved when they watch the cursed tape that Kazuyuki carelessly left in their apartment. Despite Kazuyuki managing to save himself, Shizuka and Yoko still end up dying from the curse despite having copied and showed the tapes to Toru and Setsuko. It is later revealed that the two die because the virus had mutated into a far more dangerous form by the time they watched it, meaning they were doomed from the start no matter what they did.

In the film series as well as television series, Yoko's character is played by Yoichi Asakawa (浅川 陽一), portrayed by Rikiya Otaka and Yûta Fukagawa respectively. Unlike in the novel, Yoichi in the film is about seven years old and has much more involvement in the story as he is revealed to possess ESP powers from his father, Ryuji, and Sadako's possession of him becomes a major plot point in Ring 2. In the television series Yoichi is a toddler instead of a seven-year-old. As for Shizuka, she is usually excised in the adaptations which change Kazuyuki's gender; her counterpart is not present in the Japanese, Korean, and American theatrical films.

Yoichi appears in Dead by Daylight, voiced by Mirai Kawashima. Following the events of Ring 2, Yoichi grew up and graduated from university with a degree in marine biology, eventually becoming a professor there. When two of his students disappear in Izu Ōshima, Yoichi is reminded of his past. This leads him to obsessively expand his field of research into paranormal activity, resulting in Yoichi being ostracized by his peers and termination from his position at the university. Yoichi was undeterred, and with guidance from Ryuji, would come across a case at a lighthouse in Glasgow, Scotland similar to the disappearance of his students. On his way to the lighthouse, the boat is damaged and Yoichi barely makes it to shore, where he enters the lighthouse and eventually disappearing into a black fog. Yoichi then participates in the normal gameplay of Dead by Daylight, an endless trial in a strange dimension where he must work with other survivors to escape various killers.

In the BBC radio drama adaptation, the equivalent of Shizuka is instead named Toni.

=== Heihachiro Ikuma ===
Doctor Heihachiro Ikuma (伊熊 平八郎, Ikuma Heihachirō) is Shizuko's lover and Sadako's father. He had an affair with Shizuko while working as a professor at Tokyo University. Ikuma displayed Shizuko's powers to gain fame, but soon the couple had to face the attacks of the scientific community, who branded them as frauds. Driven insane, Ikuma tried to activate possible psychic powers of his own by meditating below a waterfall, causing him to develop tuberculosis. He then spent the rest of his life in a TB ward in the Izu Peninsula, being cared for by his daughter.

In the films, Ikuma is not Sadako's biological father, but he did raise her after Shizuko moved into his house. He noticed that Sadako had a murderous evil twin, locking the latter away for years in the attic. He eventually tossed her down the well after both girls reunited and killed numerous people. He died shortly after. He was played by Daisuke Ban.

=== Akane Maruyama ===
Akane Maruyama (丸山 茜, Maruyama Akane) is Takanori Ando's girlfriend in S. She is twenty four years old high school teacher and is pregnant with his child. Akane came from a lower-class background, having been raised in an orphanage after her mother's death, and sometimes feels that she is unworthy of a man of Takanori's status. After Takanori receives a USB file containing the suicide video of Seiji Kashiwada, she becomes drawn by a force to watch it. In addition to this, Akane also feels stalked by a figure, whom she deduces is Seiji, a serial killer who nearly killed her ten years ago. It is eventually revealed that her stalker is actually named Hiroyuki Niimura, a former student of Ryuji Takayama. Ryuji had impersonated the real Seiji to protect the world's last Sadako clones, but he failed in saving all of them. However, he managed to save Akane when she became Hiroyuki's target, but ended up leading the real Seiji to be wrongfully executed. Ryuji then reveals that he is Akane's biological father, fathering her with a Sadako clone named Masako Maruyama. At the end of the novel, Akane marries Takanori, allowing her to publicize her pregnancy to everyone.

In the film adaptations of S, Sadako 3D and Sadako 3D 2, Akane is portrayed by Satomi Ishihara. Unlike in the novel, Akane is protagonist of Sadako 3D and her connection with Ryuji is not present. Instead, Akane possesses special psychic power that makes her becoming targeted by Sadako to be her vessel. Her surname is also changed to Ayakawa (鮎川)

=== Jotaro Nagao ===
Jotaro Nagao (長尾 城太郎, Nagao Jōtarō) is a doctor responsible for tossing Sadako down the well in the novels. The last smallpox patient in Japan, he was institutionalized at the same sanatorium where Sadako's father, Heihachiro Ikuma, was treated in. During one fateful day, Nagao wandered from his facility and encountered Sadako. He then raped her, passing on the smallpox virus to her, before discovering that she had Testicular Feminization Syndrome. According to Nagao, a voice inside him persuaded him to throw Sadako down the well, where the smallpox virus interacted with her psychic powers to form a new virus. Years later, Kazuyuki and Ryuji visit Jotaro, now operating a clinic in Atami, and confront him to divulge the truth about Sadako. The experience traumatizes him, forcing him to close the clinic so his daughter can take care of him.

He is played by Kei Yamamoto in the television series and Tomorowo Taguchi in Ring: Kanzenban. His role in the Japanese films is merged with Heihachiro Ikuma, who is made Sadako's adopted father.

=== Tomoko Oishi and Masami Kurahashi ===
Tomoko Oishi (大石 智子, Ōishi Tomoko) is Kazuyuki's teenage niece, the only daughter of his wife, Shizuka's sister Yoshimi Oishi. She is one of the first four victims of the cursed tape, which she watched a week before the events of Ring. The similarity of her case with a male college student who died at the same time, as well as another couple, leads Kazuyuki to begin investigating the ring virus.

In the films, Tomoko and Masami Kurahashi (倉橋 雅美, Kurahashi Masami) are the pair of girls seen at the start of Ring, discussing rumors of the cursed tape which turn out to be true. When Tomoko is killed by Sadako, Masami witnesses the death and goes mad, ending up in hospital. In Ring 2, Mai encounters Masami in hospital and she is used by Doctor Kawajiri in his first attempt to destroy Sadako's powers but is killed in the process. They are played by Yuko Takeuchi and Hitomi Sato, respectively.

=== Okazaki ===
Okazaki (岡崎) is a journalist who works alongside Reiko Asakawa. He only appears in the film series. Okazaki has a brief role in the first film, but reappears in Ring 2 investigating Reiko's disappearance and helps Mai for a part of the film. He gets a copy of the tape from a girl named Kanae Sawaguchi who he promises to save after she watches the tape, but lies and allows her to die. This comes back to literally haunt him as Kanae's ghost stalks him until he ends up in hospital. He is played by Yūrei Yanagi.

=== Reiko Sugiura ===
Reiko Sugiura (杉浦 礼子, Sugiura Reiko) is Kaoru Futami's girlfriend. Reiko is a carrier of the Metastatic Human Cancer Virus; although she does not contract the virus itself, she passed it to Ryoji (亮次, Ryōji), her only son by her deceased husband, who commits suicide upon learning that his mother slept with Kaoru and became pregnant by him. Kaoru's motivation to find a cure in the Loop world is to be able to liberate Reiko of the virus; as he dies in the artificial world; his last thoughts are of Reiko. Reiko is the protagonist of the short story Happy Birthday, which chronicles her life after the cure for the MHC is found. She gives birth to a healthy boy and witnesses Kaoru's spirit caressing the boy and wishing him a happy birthday.

=== Mai Takano ===
Mai Takano (高野 舞, Takano Mai) is Ryuji Takayama's student and possibly girlfriend. Mai has a minor role in the first novel, finding his body after he dies of the ring virus. Mai has a larger role in Spiral. In it, she helps Ando to solve Ryuji's case and makes plans to date him. When she accidentally stumbles upon the cursed tape in Ryuji's bedroom, she feels the urge to watch it, after which she experiences morning sickness. In the week after, Mai disappears until her body is discovered cramped inside a shaft in a building. As later revealed, because Mai was ovulating when she watched the tape, the virus infected her ovum, causing it to develop rapidly into a Sadako clone. The virus then enchanted Mai to seek an isolated place so the clone could be delivered without catching anyone's attention. Ryuji had deliberately placed the tape so Mai would stumble on it, as he has been working with Sadako to come back to life.

In S, Ryuji reveals that he fathered Akane Maruyama with Masako, the Sadako clone born to Mai Takano, making her Akane's maternal grandmother.

Mai is played by Miki Nakatani in the films. Her character role differs between the sequels. Spiral sticks with the plot of the novel, with Mai helping Ando investigate what truly killed Ryuji and learns of the tape and Sadako. The two end up sleeping together, leading to Sadako's resurrection, Mai used as an incubator for Sadako in her fertile stage and is killed. In Ring 2, Mai investigates Ryuji's death and becomes attached to Reiko and Yoichi. She helps them flee the police, but Reiko is hit by a truck and dies. Mai becomes Yoichi's guardian and looks after him. At the end, Mai and Yoichi are involved in an experiment by Dr. Kawajiri to remove Sadako's powers from the boy. The experiment goes awry and everyone present save Mai and Yoichi die, who end up in the well but escape thanks to Ryuji and Sadako allowing them to leave.

=== Hiroshi Toyama ===
Hiroshi Toyama (遠山 博, Tōyama Hiroshi) is Sadako's lover, introduced in the short story Lemon Heart. Years ago, as the sound operator of Theater Group Soaring, Toyama learnt of Sadako's thoughtography but accepted them, promising to run away with her, but an early form of Sadako's curse started killing troupe members and Sadako fled to avoid killing Toyama. Toyama eventually married and had kids, but he never moves on from Sadako. He recites the story to Kenzo Yoshino, who informs him of Sadako's death as well as a potential fate that befalls him and all other troupe members involved with Sadako. A week later, Toyama suffers a heart attack and sees Sadako, reborn from the womb of Mai Takano, approach and caress him as he dies.

In the film prequel Ring 0: Birthday, Toyama is dating Etsuko Tachihara but leaves her for Sadako. He is killed by the reunited forms of Sadako, who is unable to recognise friend from foe. He is played by Seiichi Tanabe.

=== Shizuko Yamamura ===
Shizuko Yamamura (山村 志津子, Yamamura Shizuko) is Sadako's mother. A psychic who had the power to burn images onto paper, it is implied that she gained her powers after hauling the statue of En no Ozunu off the coast of Izu Oshima. Shizuko had an affair with a married professor from the mainland, Heihachiro Ikuma, and gave birth to his daughter, Sadako, as well as a stillborn boy. Ikuma displayed Shizuko's powers in public demonstrations, gaining the couple fame, but backlash soon appeared from the scientific community. During one fateful demonstration, Shizuko was unable to use her power, causing the media to brand her a fraud. This led the couple into a downward spiral as they became objects of scorn. Eventually, Shizuko took her own life by jumping into Mount Mihara, leaving Sadako in the care of her relatives.

In the films, Ikuma is not Sadako's father and it is implied that Shizuko became pregnant through mystical means. Her powers were put on display by Doctor Ikuma and Shizuko's cousin, Takashi, for the press. However, one journalist mocked Shizuko and labelled her a fraud. He was murdered by a young Sadako. Shizuko eventually went insane, spending hours on end standing in front of a mirror combing her hair. She predicted the eruption of a nearby volcano on Oshima Island, and her prediction came true the day she committed suicide by leaping into the volcano. She was played by actress Masako. Her American counterpart is split into two characters: Anna Morgan, played by Shannon Cochran. She was a famous horse breeder but suffered from hallucinations caused by Samara, leading to her trapping Samara down a well. She committed suicide moments after by falling off a cliff. The second one is Samara's biological mother, Evelyn Borden (née Osorio), played by Sissy Spacek. She tried to drown Samara as an infant and has been living in a mental institution ever since.

=== Takashi Yamamura ===
Takashi Yamamura (山村 敬, Yamamura Takashi) is Shizuko's cousin. Takashi never appears in the novels, being mentioned only a few times in Ring. He had a part in raising Sadako after Shizuko's suicide and operates a bed and breakfast in the south of the island. During the events of the book, Takashi is offshore to fish, returning only after Kazuyuki has returned back to the mainland.

Takashi has a larger role in the films, where he is played by Yoichi Numata. He was responsible for setting up Shizuko's public demonstration and was the catalyst for the events following to Sadako's imprisonment in the well. In Ring 2, he shows regret for his actions and allows Sadako's ghost to kill him. His American counterpart is Richard Morgan, played by Brian Cox. Samara's adoptive father, Richard hates Samara for the effects of her powers on Anna and banishes her to the family barn before her death. He kills himself in The Ring via electrocution in a bath after being visited by Rachel.

=== Kenzo Yoshino ===
Kenzo Yoshino (吉野 賢三, Yoshino Kenzō) is a colleague and close friend of Kazuyuki Asakawa. A 35-year-old journalist, Yoshino works in the company's branch office in Yokosuka, Kanagawa, where Kazuyuki also worked in until he was promoted to the head office in Tokyo. He helps Kazuyuki and Ryuji investigate the origins of the cursed videotape and Sadako Yamamura, following Kazuyuki's instructions, but refuses to watch the tape. In Spiral, he helps Ando to solve Ryuji's case, handing him files pertaining to Kazuyuki's search. In Birthday, Yoshino meets with Hiroshi Toyama, who dated Sadako as a young man, intending to learn more about her past and informing him about his potential fate.

He cameos in the first film, and has a prominent role in the retconned Spiral, where he comes into possession of Reiko's journal, which carries the Ring Virus, and he is eventually killed by it.
