= Ring 2 =

- Film poster

Japanese name
- Katakana: リング2
Transcriptions
- Revised Hepburn: Ringu 2
- Directed by: Hideo Nakata
- Screenplay by: Hiroshi Takahashi
- Story by: Koji Suzuki
- Produced by: Takashige Ichise; Shin Ishihara
- Starring: Miki Nakatani; Hitomi Satō; Kyoko Fukada; Nanako Matsushima; Hiroyuki Sanada
- Cinematography: Hideo Yamamoto
- Edited by: Nobuyuki Takahashi
- Music by: Kenji Kawai
- Production company: Asmik Ace Entertainment
- Distributed by: Toho
- Release date: January 23, 1999 (Japan)
- Running time: 95 minutes
- Country: Japan
- Language: Japanese
- Box office: $31.3 million (Japan)

Ring 2 (Japanese: リング2, Hepburn: Ringu 2) is a 1999 Japanese supernatural horror film, directed by Hideo Nakata and serves as a sequel to Ring.

Ring was originally a novel written by Koji Suzuki; its sequel, Spiral, was also adapted into a film as the sequel to Ring. Due to the negative response to Spiral, Ring 2 was made as a new sequel to Ring; it was not based on Suzuki's works and ultimately ignores the story of Spiral.

Ring 2 takes place four weeks after the first film, directly continuing the story which features most of the cast from Ring reprising their roles.

== Plot ==
After retrieving Sadako Yamamura's body from a well, the police summon her uncle Takashi to identify her. Detective Omuta informs Takashi that, according to forensics, Sadako survived in the well for 30 years. The remains are returned to Takashi, who gives them a burial at sea, hoping to be free from the guilt he has carried since her mother, Shizuko, committed suicide because of his actions.

Following the sudden deaths of Reiko Asakawa's ex-husband Ryuji Takayama and her father Koichi, the police look for her and her son Yoichi. Ryuji's assistant, Mai Takano, and Reiko's colleague, Okazaki, search for answers together. After they find a burned videotape in Reiko's apartment, Mai senses that Reiko's father died the same way as Ryuji.

Investigating the urban legend of the cursed videotape, Okazaki meets a high school student, Kanae Sawaguchi. She gives him a tape copy but admits she watched it herself. She begs Okazaki to watch the tape before the week is up, but he hides his copy in his desk drawer at work.

Trying to contact Masami Kurahashi, a friend of Reiko's niece Tomoko, Mai and Okazaki learn she is now mute and has a phobia of televisions after witnessing Tomoko's death. Dr. Oisho Kawajiri, Masami's doctor and a paranormal researcher, tries to expel the psychic energy within Masami through experimentation. Mai steps out for some air, encountering Masami, whose presence causes Sadako to materialize on television and terrify the patients. Masami tries to channel her fear into psychic vessel Mai, who realizes Yoichi has been trying to do the same thing.

Mai finds Yoichi and Reiko in a shopping mall. Yoichi has been mute since his father and grandfather's deaths, and his psychic abilities intensified. Reiko asks if Kawajiri can help. Returning to the hospital, Mai discovers that Okazaki has accidentally led the police to Kawajiri, who has informed them of Mai's contact with Reiko. Mai, Okazaki, and Detective Omuta observe Kawajiri's experiment to exorcise the psychic energy from Masami by projecting her mental imagery onto a blank tape. However, it causes the cursed videotape's imagery to appear. Mai destroys the recording. Omuta tortures Mai into revealing Reiko and Yoichi's location, forcing Mai to view Kanae's fear-contorted corpse. Overcome with guilt, Mai telepathically tells Yoichi to flee the police station. Yoichi psychically attacks the cops and escapes with Reiko, who is consequently hit and crushed underneath a truck. Yoichi begins to kill Omuta psychically, but Mai stops him, and the two run off together. Okazaki attempts to delete his interview with Kanae, only for her ghost to materialize and haunt him.

Mai and Yoichi travel to Oshima Island and stay in the Yamamura Inn. Yoichi has a nightmare, causing Shizuko's and a young Sadako's ghosts to appear before Mai wards them away. Dr. Kawajiri arrives in the night, offering to exorcise Yoichi as he tried with Masami, with Mai volunteering to act as a conduit to expel Sadako's hatred into a swimming pool, water being able to neutralize the energy. The attempt goes awry, and Sadako's coffin appears in the pool. Takashi jumps in, demanding to be taken by Sadako, while Kawajiri dives into the pool carrying electrical equipment, killing themselves alongside their assistant.

Mai and Yoichi fall into the water, appearing inside the well. Ryuji's ghost appears, absorbing Yoichi's fear, and summons a rope that will guide Mai to safety as long as she doesn't look down. Sadako's ghost appears, scaling the well only to cryptically ask, "Why is it only you were saved?". Mai and Yoichi emerge from the pool, tentatively free of their fear. While Okazaki is institutionalized, a nurse takes a picture of him. As she leaves the room, she notices something in the photo, seemingly shocked; behind Okazaki is Kanae's laughing spirit, looking for revenge.

== Cast ==
- Miki Nakatani as Mai Takano
- Rikiya Otaka as Yoichi Asakawa
- Nanako Matsushima as Reiko Asakawa
- Yoichi Numata as Takashi Yamamura
- Rie Inō as Sadako Yamamura
  - Mebuki Tsuchida as young Sadako Yamamura
- Kyoko Fukada as Kanae Sawaguchi
- Yūrei Yanagi as Okazaki
- Hitomi Satō as Masami Kurahashi
- Hiroyuki Sanada as Ryuji Takayama
- Fumiyo Kohinata as Ishi Kawajiri
- Kenjirō Ishimaru as Detective Keiji Omuta
- Masako as Shizuko Yamamura

== Production ==
Following the commercial success of Ring and Spiral, Kadokawa Shoten and Ace Pictures announced a public screenplay competition for a sequel or spin-off. Entrants were asked to submit an original screenplay for either Ring 2 or a related Ring story, with a ¥5 million prize and the possibility of the winning screenplay being produced as a film. The judging panel consisted of author Koji Suzuki, director Hideo Nakata, producer Masato Hara and Kadokawa executive Tsuguhiko Kadokawa.

No submitted screenplay was ultimately selected for production. Nakata later recalled that, after failing to find a suitable entry, he and Ring screenwriter Hiroshi Takahashi decided to develop the sequel themselves. Because Suzuki's novel Spiral and its film adaptation already existed, Nakata and Takahashi chose to devise an original story which would instead function as a direct continuation of Ring. Takahashi subsequently wrote an original screenplay that disregarded the events of Spiral.

A production press conference was held at the Imperial Hotel, Tokyo on September 22, 1998. Nakata, Suzuki, Hara and Kadokawa attended alongside cast members Miki Nakatani and Hitomi Satō.

== Release ==
Ring 2 was released in Japan on January 23, 1999, where it was distributed by Toho. It was released on a double bill with the film Shikoku. The film screened at the Fantasia International Film Festival in Montreal in 1999, with director Hideo Nakata in attendance. The festival later credited the enthusiastic audience response to Ring and Ring 2 with encouraging DreamWorks to acquire the franchise rights. The film was also presented at the Sitges Film Festival in Spain that year.

In South Korea, Ring 2 was released theatrically on 22 July 2000. A British theatrical release followed in January 2001. In France, the film opened on 20 March 2002, distributed by Euripide Distribution. In the Philippines, the film was released as Ring 2: Call of Evil on March 5, 2003.

=== Box office ===
It was the second highest-grossing Japanese film of 1999 (after Pokémon: The Movie 2000), earning a distribution income (rentals) of ¥2.1 billion upon its theatrical release. Ring 2 grossed a total Japanese box office revenue of ¥3.57 billion ($31.3 million).

In South Korea, the film sold 128,521 tickets. In France, the film sold 22,263 tickets, bringing the film's total overseas box office to 150,784 ticket sales.

=== Home media ===
In the United Kingdom, it was watched by 360,000 viewers on television during the first half of 2005, making it the seventh most-watched foreign-language film on UK television during that period. The original Ring also drew 390,000 viewers on UK television during the same period, adding up to a combined 750,000 UK television viewership for both Ring films during the first half of 2005.

In Japan, Ring 2 was released on DVD by Pioneer LDC on 11 August 2000. In the United Kingdom, the film was released on DVD by Tartan Video on 30 July 2001. An Italian DVD edition was released by Dynit on 21 May 2003, featuring Japanese and Italian audio. The film was released directly to video in the United States on August 23, 2005, by DreamWorks.

In Japan, Kadokawa released a standalone Blu-ray edition on 27 April 2012. In 2019, Arrow Films included the film in its Ring Collection Blu-ray box set, released in the United Kingdom on 18 March and the United States on 29 October.

== Reception ==
Variety referred to the film as a "very different beast" than the Ring, with "less atmosphere and more genre shocks". The review stated that the film "notably fails to build on the first movie's wonderfully nasty final scene" and is "progressively more conventional with no special visual style or under-the-skins frissons".

Keith Hennessey Brown of Eye for Film described the film as an effective, atmospheric and stylish sequel, while finding its narrative more meandering and less effective than that of its predecessor. The New Zealand International Film Festival, where the film screened in 2001, described it as a rare sequel that in some respects improved upon the original.

As a result of the film's popularity, one of the film's cast members, Kyoko Fukada (role of Kanae Sawaguchi), was offered a recording contract with Pony Canyon (the label that handled the releases of the film's soundtrack and its accompanying single), and her debut single "Saigo no Kajitsu" (最後の果実, The Last Fruit) was released by Pony Canyon on May 19, 1999.

Ring 2 holds a 7% rating on Rotten Tomatoes, based on fourteen reviews.

== Legacy ==
A prequel film was released the following year, Ring 0: Birthday (2000), based on the Lemon Heart segment of the Suzuki anthology novel Birthday in the Ring novel series. 13 years after this film’s release, the soft reboot Sadako 3D (2012) was released, loosely based on the Suzuki novel S, from the aforementioned Ring novel series. It ignores the continuity of this film and instead acknowledges the film Spiral, the original forgotten sequel that this film was meant to replace.

In 2019, a follow-up to this film was released called Sadako (2019), a direct sequel to Ring 2 that follows its own continuity separate from the Spiral continuity.

== See also ==
- List of ghost films
