= Ringu =

Ringu (the Japanese romanization of ring) may refer to:

- Ring (franchise)
- Ring (novel series)
- Ring (Suzuki novel) published in 1991
- Ring (1995 film), the 1995 adaptation of the above novel
- Ring (1998 film), the 1998 adaptation of the above novel
- Ringu Ringu language
