= Rasen =

Rasen may refer to:

- Rasen (novel) or Spiral, a 1995 Japanese novel by Koji Suzuki
- Rasen (film) or Spiral, a 1998 Japanese film based on the novel
- Rasen (TV series), a 1999 Japanese TV drama based on the novel
