= Birthday (short story collection) =

1999 book by Kōji Suzuki

- Author: Koji Suzuki
- Original title: Birthday (バースデイ, Bāsudei)
- Translator: Glynne Walley
- Cover artist: Chip Kidd
- Language: Japanese
- Series: Ring
- Genre: Horror
- Publisher: Kadokawa Shoten, Vertical, Inc.
- Publication date: 1999
- Publication place: Japan
- English publication date: 2006
- Media type: Print (hardback & paperback)
- Preceded by: Loop
- Followed by: S

Birthday (バースデイ, Bāsudei) is a story collection by Japanese writer Koji Suzuki and first published on February 5, 1999, in Japan. It is the fourth installment of Suzuki's Ring series.

== Plot ==
The book consists of three short stories occurring in different timeframes within the Ring universe:

=== Coffin in the Sky (空に浮かぶ棺, Sora ni Ukabu Hitsugi) ===
In November 1990, during the events of Spiral, Mai Takano wakes up at the bottom of an exhaust shaft of a building near Tokyo Bay. The only way out is by climbing a fabric tied to a beam above, but her ankle is broken, and the shaft is too small for her to move about. Mai also finds out that she is pregnant, despite never having a sexual encounter. She experiences bouts of leaving and entering unconsciousness and tries to recall her life and the events leading up to this point. As a former aide of Ryuji Takayama, who died of the ring virus, she was ordered by his publisher to search for some missing work papers in his childhood home. Once there, Mai was entranced by Ryuji's copy of the cursed video, took it home, and watched it. Upon watching, she felt movement in her belly and underwent morning sickness. Mai realizes that the fetus caused her to go into a trance. Under its control, she left her home with a cloth and a sack of towels, went to the shaft, and tied the fabric to climb down. She slipped, fell, and broke her ankle.

Mai's pregnancy is soon due, and she gives birth to a baby whom she realizes is Sadako Yamamura, who is reborn. The baby, Sadako, cuts her umbilical cord from the placenta, wipes herself with the towel, and leaves the shaft using the cloth. It grins at Mai and throws the fabric back into the shaft, leaving her to die.

=== Lemon Heart (レモンハート) ===
Hiroshi Toyama calls journalist Kenzo Yoshino to tell him more about Sadako Yamamura. Yoshino has just attended Kazuyuki Asakawa's funeral and also received news of Mai Takano's death in an exhaust shaft. Toyama is nearing his fifties, a twice-married man with children and a stable job, but he longs to meet Sadako, the only woman he truly loves. He recounts to Yoshino events that transpired 21 years earlier, when Toyama was merely a young sound director trainee of Theater Group Soaring. Toyama had a secret affair with Sadako, who begged him not to reveal it to outsiders as she still wanted to achieve success as a stage actress without controversy. Sadako pointed out the existence of an altar with a wrinkled umbilical cord behind Toyama's work room, which unsettled him. Toyama was further unsettled when Sadako groped director Yusaku Shigemori, which she stated was just a way to keep him away from her. She later apologized by having sex with Toyama in his workroom. Toyama felt as if her voice penetrated his head directly.

At the end of his story, Yoshino reluctantly tells Toyama that Sadako is probably dead. Yoshino then relays the truth about what happened at the end of the play, which he heard from another surviving ex-member. During the closing party, Toyama left the theater complex to drink. Another trainee named Okubo, who had a crush on Sadako, was rummaging through the sound room when he found a tape recording of Sadako and Toyama's intercourse. Jealous, he broadcast it to the green room, where several people, including Shigemori, heard it. The next day, Shigemori mysteriously died after supposedly visiting Sadako's apartment. The day was when Sadako disappeared from Toyama's life for good. Yoshino says that everyone who heard the recording, including Okubo, died in the previous year, one after another.

Toyama becomes paranoid of his mortality, as while he did not hear the recording, he was present in it. He also knew that Sadako used her thoughtography to record the sex tape. A week after the meeting with Yoshino, Toyama feels aches in his heart and collapses on the street. He sees a woman in a green dress following him while carrying an umbilical cord. Upon closer look, Toyama realizes that the woman is Sadako reborn, and the cord is the one she cut from Mai's womb. Instead of becoming frightened, Toyama welcomes her and dies in Sadako's arms.

=== Happy Birthday (ハッピー・バースデイ) ===
Following the events of Loop, Reiko Sugiura is called to meet with Toru Amano, a scientist of the LOOP project. She is shown events in the project: the deaths of Mai Takano and Hiroshi Toyama, both connected by Sadako Yamamura. Amano reveals to Reiko about the LOOP project, a simulated but alive universe mirroring the real world, how it was frozen 20 years ago just when the project was consumed by Sadako and her ring virus/Metastatic Human Cancer Virus (MHCV), and how Kaoru Futami, a reincarnation of Ryuji Takayama and Reiko's lover, had found a cure to neutralize the virus. Amano says that Kaoru entered the LOOP to find the cure and is dead in the real world. However, he promised Amano and Prof. Eliot that he would allow them to meet with Reiko face-to-face. Reiko dons virtual reality goggles and gloves and is thrust into the LOOP, where she meets Kaoru, who is attempting to assure her that everything is alright.

Months go by, and Reiko awaits her son's due date with Kaoru. Having lost her husband, her son, Ryoji, and Kaoru, loneliness increasingly overwhelms her, although she is keeping in touch with Kaoru's father, Hideyuki, who has been cured of the MHC. She periodically checks the LOOP to see Kaoru, whom she learns has rapidly aged from a 20-year-old to a 37-year-old, and finally to an old man in his sixties. Reiko is told that, other than the neutralizer, Kaoru also found a virus that makes the Sadako clones of LOOP rapidly age and die; however, because Kaoru is also a clone, he is affected by the virus. Eventually, Reiko has to see Kaoru die on the street while dreaming of Reiko.

When her time is due, Reiko gives birth to a healthy boy. She sees Kaoru's spirit appear in her room. He cradles their son and says, "Happy Birthday."

== Adaptations ==
No adaptations have adapted all three stories at once. The 2000 film Ring 0: Birthday and the audio drama adapt the short story Lemonheart, while the 1999 manga adapts Floating Coffin and Lemonheart, leaving out Happy Birthday, instead replacing it with a new story called Sadako. In March 2017, an audiobook featuring Rei Shimoda, was released on Audible.

Films

- Ring 0: Birthday (2000)

Audio drama

- Birthday (2000)

Manga

- Birthday (1999)

== Editions ==
Vertical, Inc. published the English translation of Birthday in December 2006.

== Sources and external links ==
- The Ring AREA – contains the cursed videos of the Ring cycle and their scene-by-scene analyses, as well as much other useful information.
- Vertical Inc. – publisher of English translations of the Ring novels.
