= Rikiya Otaka =

Japanese actor

- Born: Rikiya Otaka; August 27, 1991 (age 34); Kanagawa, Japan
- Occupation: Actor
- Years active: 1996–2006

Rikiya Otaka (大高 力也, Ōtaka Rikiya; born 27 August 1991) is a Japanese retired actor.

== Career ==
Otaka was born in Kanagawa, Japan. At age six he was chosen to play the part of seven-year-old Yoichi Asakawa in Ring. Today, he (alongside Hiroyuki Sanada who played Ryuji Takayama in Ring) is the most credited and popular male character in the Ring series. He reprised his role as Yoichi a year after the first sequel Spiral was a failure in the cinemas. In Ring 2, his character was the supporting male actor.

At 9 he worked as an extra and made a notable appearance in the film adaptation of the hit TV series Kamen Rider Agito. He then rejoined Hideo Nakata to play Yuuchi in Sleeping Bride. He made small appearances in Chloe and The Sea Is Watching.

He then starred as the main player in Baseball Kids. He then starred in a drama movie Catharsis as Subaru.

He more recently starred with Ken Watanabe in the drama history film Kita no Zeronen playing the Mamiya's son.

== Filmography ==
=== TV series ===
- Dear Woman (TBS, 1996) - Junpei Tsuno
- Beach Boys (Fuji TV, 1997, Ep.9) - Haruki Yoshinaga
- Ai to Kandō no Jitsuwa: Sayonara Mōdōken Berna (Fuji TV, 1998) - Kanta
- Aoi (NHK, 2000) - Young Toyotomi Hideyori
- Nagoya Senkyaku Banrai (NHK, 2000) - Hiroshi Yoshida
- Black Jack 2: Tensai Joi no Wedding Dress (TBS, 2000) - Takashi Machiyama
- Musashi (NHK, 2003) - Young Sasaki Kojirō
- Kunimitsu no Matsuri (Fuji TV, 2003) - Fujio Egashira
- Uchi wa Step Family (TBS, 2005) - Shō Takano

=== Films ===
- Ring (1998) - Yoichi Asakawa
- Ring 2 (1999) - Yoichi Asakawa
- Sleeping Bride (2000) - Young Yūichi Nagasawa
- Chloe (2001) - Boy
- Kamen Rider Agito the Movie: Project G4 (2001) - Rei Motoki
- Tasogare Ryūseigun: Dōsōkai Seidan (2002) - Akira
- The Sea Is Watching (2002)
- Baseball Kids (2003) - Tsubasa Machida
- Life is Journey (2003)
- Catharsis (2003) - Subaru
- The Boat to Heaven (2003) - Young Haruto Ishida
- Kita no Zeronen (2005) - Yūnosuke Mamiya
- Mabataki (2006) - Yukio
