= Hitomi Satō =

Hitomi Satō may refer to:

- Hitomi Sato (actress) (佐藤 仁美, born 1979), Japanese actress
- Hitomi Sato (table tennis) (佐藤 瞳, born 1997), Japanese table tennis player
