= Rock: Wanko no Shima =

Rock ~Wanko no Shima~
- Film Poster
- Directed by: Isamu Nakae
- Starring: Ryuta Sato, Kumiko Asō
- Production company: Fuji TV
- Distributed by: Toho
- Release date: 23 July 2011 (Japan)
- Country: Japan
- Language: Japanese

Rock ~Wanko no Shima~ (ロック ～わんこの島～, Rokku ~ wanko no shima ~) is a 2011 Japanese film directed by Isamu Nakae and was scheduled to be released in Japanese cinemas on 23 July 2011. It is based on a true story from the small island of Miyakejima.

== Cast ==
- Ryuta Sato
- Kumiko Asō
- Yoshinori Okada
- Shuuji Kashiwabara
- Koki Sahara
- Taiki Nakahayashi
- Jiro Sato
- Ken Mitsuishi
- Hitomi Satō
- Okayamahajime
- Shisho Nakamaru
- Mieko Harada
- Mitsuko Baisho
- Karen Miyama

== Filming ==
=== Post Production ===
This film's official trailer was first uploaded to this film's official page on April 16, 2011.
