= Rings (2017 film) =

2017 film by F. Javier Gutiérrez

- Theatrical release poster
- Directed by: F. Javier Gutiérrez
- Screenplay by: David Loucka; Jacob Estes; Akiva Goldsman
- Story by: David Loucka; Jacob Estes
- Based on: Spiral by Kōji Suzuki
- Produced by: Walter F. Parkes; Laurie MacDonald
- Starring: Matilda Lutz; Alex Roe; Johnny Galecki; Aimee Teegarden; Bonnie Morgan; Vincent D'Onofrio
- Cinematography: Sharone Meir
- Edited by: Steven Mirkovich; Jeremiah O'Driscoll
- Music by: Matthew Margeson
- Production companies: Paramount Pictures; Parkes/MacDonald Productions
- Distributed by: Paramount Pictures
- Release date: February 3, 2017
- Running time: 102 minutes
- Country: United States
- Language: English
- Budget: $25 million
- Box office: $83.1 million

Rings (Note: Known in Japan as The Ring: Rebirth.) is a 2017 American supernatural horror film directed by F. Javier Gutiérrez and written by David Loucka, Jacob Aaron Estes and Akiva Goldsman. It is the third installment in The Ring series and served as a direct sequel to the 2002 film, ignoring the events of The Ring Two (2005). It is based on elements of the novel Spiral by Kōji Suzuki. It stars Matilda Lutz as a young woman who finds herself on the receiving end of a terrifying curse that threatens to take her life in seven days. Alex Roe, Johnny Galecki, Aimee Teegarden, Bonnie Morgan and Vincent D'Onofrio also star in supporting roles.

Paramount Pictures had initially planned a third film, originally titled The Ring 3D, in early 2014, directed by Gutiérrez and written by Loucka and Estes. Later, Goldsman had been hired to co-write the script, while the film had been retitled to Rings. Principal photography began in March 2015, in Atlanta, and wrapped on May that same year. Reshoots took place in July 2016.

Rings was released in the United States on February 3, 2017, by Paramount Pictures. It received generally negative reviews from critics but was a box-office success, grossing $83 million worldwide on a budget of $25 million.

== Plot ==
In 2013, on an airplane bound for Seattle, Carter reveals that he has watched Samara Morgan's cursed videotape. Kelly reveals she has seen the tape too, and asks Carter if he made a copy; he replies that he did not. Moments later, Samara causes the airplane to crash, killing Carter and everyone else aboard.

Two years later in 2015, a college professor, Gabriel Brown, buys Carter's old VCR, discovering the videotape inside. In the process, he meets Skye and they hit it off. Elsewhere, a student, Julia, sees her boyfriend, Holt, off to college, but she grows concerned when he ghosts her. Soon, a panicked girl, Skye, contacts her because she is also concerned about Holt. When Julia goes looking for Holt, she meets Gabriel, and finds a group of people known as the Sevens, who are involved in an experiment involving the cursed video. The Sevens film themselves watching the video before passing the footage to another person called a "tail".

Julia recognizes Skye instantly. She goes with Skye to her apartment to unknowingly watch the video. When Skye tries to force her to watch the video, Julia locks herself in the bathroom. Samara kills Skye in the apartment. Julia tries to rush out of the apartment, and when finally opening the door, she finds Holt on the other side. Holt reveals that he has watched the tape as well, and has 12 hours left. Julia watches his copy, and when she picks up the phone, she experiences a vision of a door. The phone burns a mark into her hand. Julia's version of the video cannot be copied, and contains additional images of a mysterious woman. She realizes they must cremate Samara's physical remains.

Gabriel photocopies the mark on Julia's hand and sends them to Sacrament Valley, where Samara was given a proper burial after the residents of Moesko Island refused to accept the remains. Julia and Holt find an unmarked tomb, but when they break in, they find it empty. They are caught and taken to a blind man named Galen Burke, who claims Samara's body was entombed by a local priest, but a flood came, leading the priest to rebury her in a potter's field outside town.

On the way to the field, Julia and Holt come upon a car crash, and learn that Gabriel was involved. He had realized the mark on Julia's hand is Braille and translated it. However, he is killed by a falling utility pole before he could warn them. After experiencing a vision of Evelyn, Julia and Holt return to town. Julia goes to the church, and discovers a hidden chamber beneath the bell tower. She finds evidence that Evelyn was imprisoned there while pregnant: held in captivity by the priest after being raped. She escaped eight months into the pregnancy.

Holt learns that Galen is the priest. Julia separately visits Galen, and explains her findings. He attacks her, revealing he is the priest as well as Samara's biological father. He blinded himself to escape the reach of her powers. Julia pushes him down the stairs, temporarily incapacitating him. Holt rushes to Galen's house, where he is knocked unconscious. Julia discovers Samara's skeleton behind a wall, and Galen tries to strangle her to prevent her from cremating Samara's remains. He claims that the cremation would unleash an unspeakable evil upon the world, and that he has killed several people who previously attempted to do the same. Suddenly, a swarm of cicadas fly in, summoning Samara through Julia's phone. Samara cures Galen's blindness, and kills him. Holt recovers and rushes to Julia's aid. That night, he and Julia cremate Samara's corpse, in an attempt to appease her spirit once and for all, and return home.

While Julia is in the shower, Holt notices a voicemail from Gabriel, who warns him of the Braille, which Holt begins to translate. In the bathroom, Julia peels away the skin where the mark was, revealing grey skin underneath. She begins to cough up black hair, from which a cicada is born. Meanwhile, Julia's copy of the cursed video is sent to everyone on her contact list, eventually going viral, despite Holt's futile attempts to disconnect the computer. As his computer glitches, the Braille translation is revealed to be "rebirth". Samara is reborn in Julia, who sees Samara's face in her mirror instead of her own.

== Cast ==
- Matilda Lutz as Julia
- Alex Roe as Holt Anthony
- Johnny Galecki as Gabriel Brown
- Vincent D'Onofrio as Galen Burke
- Aimee Teegarden as Skye Johnston
- Bonnie Morgan as Samara Morgan
- Chuck David Willis as Blue
- Patrick R. Walker as Jamal
- Zach Roerig as Carter
- Laura Slade Wiggins as Faith
- Lizzie Brocheré as Kelly
- Karen Ceesay as Flight Attendant
- Dave Blamy as First Officer
- Michael E. Sanders as Pilot
- Randall Taylor as Holt's Father
- Drew Grey as Sam
- Kayli Carter as Evelyn Borden
- Jill Jane Clements as Karen Styx
- Adam Fristoe as Chris
- Rick Baker as Vendor

== Production ==
In 2014, Paramount Pictures announced the third entry in The Ring series, originally titled The Ring 3D, directed by F. Javier Gutiérrez after vacating the Crow remake. In August, Paramount was in talks with Akiva Goldsman to write a third draft of the screenplay, which had previously been worked on by David Loucka and Jacob Aaron Estes. In November, Gutiérrez posted an Instagram photo that showed that the title of the sequel had been changed to Rings. Principal photography on the film began on March 23, 2015, in Atlanta, and wrapped on May 31. Reshoots took place in July 2016. Post-production began in June 2015 at Paramount Studios, and was concluded in November 2016.

== Release ==
Paramount Pictures originally set the film for a November 13, 2015, release, but the film was pulled from the schedule, and rescheduled the release date to April 1, 2016. The film was rescheduled again for release on October 28, 2016, to take the place of Paramount's previous October horror release staple, the Paranormal Activity series, which ended in 2015 with Paranormal Activity: The Ghost Dimension at the time. The film was delayed to February 3, 2017, most likely to avoid competition with Ouija: Origin of Evil, leaving the latter as the only horror film that debuted around Halloween 2016.

=== Marketing ===
Paramount released two trailers to promote the film. The second international trailer contained new footage. In addition, Paramount released a prank video where an actress dressed as Samara jumped out of a television to scare unwitting patrons at an electronics store. The video garnered 200 million views in 24 hours on Facebook.

=== Home media ===
Rings was released on digital HD on April 21 and on Blu-ray and DVD on May 2, 2017. The digital HD and Blu-ray releases include behind-the-scenes interviews with the cast & crew, deleted/extended scenes, and an alternate ending.

== Reception ==
=== Box office ===
Rings grossed $27.8 million in the United States and Canada and $55.3 million in other territories for a worldwide total of $83.1 million, against a production budget of $25 million.

In North America, the film was released alongside The Space Between Us and The Comedian, and was projected to gross $12–14 million from about 3,000 theaters in its opening weekend. It made $800,000 from its Thursday night previews. It went on to open to $13 million, finishing second at the box office behind fellow horror film Split.

=== Critical response ===
On Rotten Tomatoes, the film has an approval rating of 7% based on 114 reviews and an average rating of 3.2/10. The site's critical consensus reads: "Rings may offer ardent fans of the franchise a few threadbare thrills, but for everyone else, it may feel like an endless loop of muddled mythology and rehashed plot points". On Metacritic, the film has a score of 25 out of 100 based on 23 critics, indicating "generally unfavorable reviews". Audiences polled by CinemaScore gave the film an average grade of "C−" on an A+ to F scale, lower than the B– and C+ earned by its respective predecessors.

Alex Gilyadov of IGN gave the film a score of 4.5/10, stating that it "opts for lazy jump scares and a convoluted origins story no one asked for or needed", though not dismissing that it has "some chilling scenes and creepy visuals". Hernan Khatchadourian of Diario Popular described the movie as "more entertaining than the long movie by Verbinsky", praising the cinematography, direction, and acting. Peter Travers of Rolling Stone gave the film zero stars and called it a "botch job" that suffers from "demo-worthy awfulness in directing, writing and acting". Peter Sobczynski of RogerEbert.com gave a single star, calling it "more wearying than frightening". A.A. Dowd of The A.V. Club commented that the film was a pale imitation of the 2002 American remake in terms of visuals and plot structure. He also dismissed the film's characters as "bland nothings", citing their lack of development in the story. John Squires from Bloody Disgusting "dug Rings quite a bit", suggesting that "the movie itself is actually way better than its clearly-intended-for-teen-audiences marketing", and the reveal of the final scene in the trailer was "completely robbed of suspense by the marketing department".

Other international critics applauded the film. Mike McCahill of The Guardian commented that the film "smoothly reinvents the wheel", pointing out that "the admirably loopy finale, involving blind Vincent d'Onofrio's swarming army of cicadas, is worthy of one of the better Exorcist sequels". Javier Jimenez Montoya of Vavel also praised the film, stating that "it's a step forward in the horror genre" and applauding "its strong, surprising ending".

The generally negative critical reception in the United States, along with its lower-than-expected American box office intake, was partially blamed by some critics and fans for the cancellation of Paramount's newest installment of the Friday the 13th franchise.

The final numbers in the global box office pushed Paramount to consider making another film in the Ring franchise.

== Future ==
Speaking at CinemaCon, Paramount Vice Chairman Rob Moore said that should the film prove successful, more sequels could recur annually, taking the place of Paramount's Paranormal Activity series. These plans were left in doubt following Moore's departure from the company. In a post-release interview, Moore's successor, Megan Colligan, said that "time will tell" if another sequel is in the cards. Following Colligan's departure, there has been no update on a sequel.

In September 2019, The Grudge (2019) director Nicolas Pesce expressed interest in a crossover film between The Grudge and the American The Ring film series, akin to Sadako vs. Kayako (2016).

== See also ==
- List of ghost films
- List of Ring characters
