= Spiral (1998 film) =

- Theatrical release poster

Japanese name
- Hiragana: らせん
Transcriptions
- Revised Hepburn: Rasen
- Directed by: George Iida
- Screenplay by: George Iida
- Based on: Spiral by Koji Suzuki
- Produced by: Takashige Ichise; Shinya Kawai; Takenori Sento
- Starring: Kōichi Satō; Miki Nakatani; Hinako Saeki; Shingo Tsurumi; Shigemitsu Ogi; Hiroyuki Sanada
- Cinematography: Makoto Watanabe
- Edited by: Hirohide Abe
- Music by: La Finca
- Production company: Ring/Spiral Production Committee
- Distributed by: Toho
- Release date: January 31, 1998 (Japan)
- Running time: 98 minutes
- Country: Japan
- Language: Japanese

Spiral (Japanese: らせん, Hepburn: Rasen) is a 1998 Japanese supernatural horror film and a sequel to Ring (1998). It is directed by George Iida and is based on the novel of the same title by Koji Suzuki. It is titled The Spiral (stylized as the Spiral) in English on the Japanese poster and video packaging, and it was previously released in North America as Rasen (a transliteration of the Japanese title) and in the United Kingdom, Ireland, and the Philippines as The Spiral.

Ring and its sequel Spiral were released in Japan at the same time. The studio hoped this would increase revenues, because the Ring story was already a successful novel and television film. The two films shared a few cast members and had the same production team, but different directors and screenwriters; Spiral was written and directed by George Iida whereas Ring was written by Hiroshi Takahashi and directed by Hideo Nakata. After their release, Ring became an enormous success while Spiral floundered, quickly becoming the "forgotten sequel".

Takahashi and Nakata were later recruited to produce another sequel, Ring 2 (1999), which replaced Spiral as the sequel to Ring, not based on Suzuki's works, and thus ultimately ignores the story of Spiral.

== Plot ==
Following the events of Ring, the body of Ryūji Takayama, former husband of Reiko Asakawa and father of Yōichi Asakawa is examined by his friend and rival, pathologist Mitsuo Andō. After he finds a cryptic note in Takayama's stomach, Reiko and Yōichi also turn up dead. Andō soon learns of a mysterious cursed videotape haunted by the spirit of a murdered young woman. Rumor has it that anyone who watches the video will die exactly one week later. Despondent over the death of his child, and believing that his rival's ghost is guiding him, Andō decides to see the video for himself. After watching the tape, strange things begin to happen around him, and he soon discovers that the tape's restless spirit has different plans in store for him.

With the help of Takayama's student, Mai Takano, Andō discovers more about Ryūji's past and the mysterious young woman, Sadako Yamamura. Searching for the truth about why Ryūji and Yōichi died from the virus, while Reiko did not, leads him to her boss, Yoshino. Yoshino lets Andō in on a secret: he has Reiko's diary. She and Ryūji had been researching the cursed videotape. While Reiko had broken the curse, Ryūji died 1 week after watching the tape. Reiko believed creating a copy would break the curse, but Yōichi died 1 week after watching the tape, just like his father had. Yoshino shows Andō both the tape and the diary.

When Andō tells Mai Takano what he has done, she is shocked and cannot understand why, since she felt from the start that it was the video that killed Takayama and his family. As they are talking, Yoshino calls Andō. He admits that he wishes he had never been involved in Reiko's business. Andō believes that Yoshino had watched the video but denies it, saying he was too scared. However, Yoshino still dies.

Andō destroys the videotapes and ensures he will be the video's last victim. He then confides in Mai about his son's death, and they end up sleeping together. Andō asks Mai if she will be there when he dies, but Mai tells him she is too scared. He understands and decides to try to find out more about the virus that killed Takayama and his son. He discovers that the virus that killed Yoshino is different from the one that killed the father and son. Andō asks for tests to be run on him.

Meanwhile, Mai Takano goes missing, and Andō survives the curse. He starts to feel that the story was just a myth, and he is relieved when Mai turns up, but is shocked to find out that she has been found dead, having given birth with no sign of a baby. Andō goes back to work, sees "Mai" there, and discovers that she is none other than Sadako Yamamura, reborn and claiming to be "perfectly dual-gendered". He then learns that Takayama was not helping Andō stop Sadako – instead, he was helping Sadako. A virus or the video did not kill Yoshino, Andō's friend Miyashita, and many others, but rather Reiko's diary. Sadako promises to help resurrect Andō's son in exchange for his help.

In the end, Andō brings Takayama and his son back to life with help from Sadako. Just as Ryūji leaves, he tells Andō, "Many years will pass before our world will be at peace".

== Cast ==
- Kōichi Satō as Mitsuo Andō
- Miki Nakatani as Mai Takano
- Hinako Saeki as Sadako Yamamura
- Shingo Tsurumi as Miyashita
- Shigemitsu Ogi as Maekawa Keibuho
- Yutaka Matsushige as Yoshino
- Daisuke Ban as Heihachiro Ikuma
- Naoaki Manabe as Kobayashi
- Hiroyuki Sanada as Ryūji Takayama

The original author, Koji Suzuki, made a cameo appearance as a father in a department store.

== Production ==
The film originated from a project developed by Toho and Kadokawa Shoten to combine elements of Koji Suzuki's novels Ring and Spiral into a single feature film. Producer Shinya Kawai subsequently proposed adapting the novels into two interconnected films, an arrangement accepted by Toho and Kadokawa.

Production of Spiral faced a compressed schedule because its screenplay depended on the completion of Ring, particularly the resolution of its central mystery. An earlier director had been selected, but was replaced by George Iida, who had previously written the screenplay for the 1995 television adaptation of Ring. Iida completed the screenplay in approximately two weeks, with filming beginning another two weeks later. The screenplay remained unfinished in October 1997, only three months before the planned theatrical release, and the film was not completed until January 1998.

The two films were promoted as a connected "dual movie" rather than a conventional double feature. Their advertising used contrasting colour schemes, with red employed for Ring and blue for Spiral, while avoiding prominent images of the principal actors. Due to the delays affecting Spiral, only Ring was shown at the completion premiere screening.

The film's theme song was "Yuganda Tokei" (ゆがんだ時計), performed by HIIH. The song appeared on the soundtrack album for Ring and Spiral, released by Pony Canyon on 21 January 1998.

== Release ==
Spiral was released theatrically in Japan on January 31, 1998 where it was distributed by Toho. In South Korea, the film was released theatrically on 11 November 2000 under the title Ring – Rasen. In the Philippines, the film was given a limited release as The Spiral on February 25, 2004. The film received a theatrical re-release in Taiwan on 15 August 2019, distributed by GaragePlay under the title 七夜怪談：復活之路.

In the United Kingdom, The Spiral was released on DVD by ArtsMagic on 29 September 2003. In Italy, the film was released on DVD by Dynit on 14 October 2003. A Japanese DVD edition followed on 3 March 2004. The film was released directly to DVD by DreamWorks in the United States on 23 August 2005, under the transliterated title Rasen. In Italy, Dynit subsequently released a standalone Blu-ray edition on 21 November 2012.

In 2019, Spiral was released in high definition by Arrow Films under its Arrow Video imprint as part of The Ring Collection Blu-ray box set. The collection was released in the United Kingdom on 18 March and in the United States on 29 October.

It was released in high definition on Blu-ray Disc and video on demand in the United States, Canada, the United Kingdom and Ireland by Arrow Films under their Arrow Video imprint, under the title Spiral. Spiral was also included in Arrow Video's Ring Collection Blu-ray box set.

== Reception ==
Den of Geek called the film "neither as poor as its reputation suggests or a long lost gem", while Collider called it a "gonzo sequel, one that doesn't hold itself together as well as its predecessor, it is a movie that should not be forgotten".

The simultaneous theatrical release of Ring and Spiral generated a combined ¥1 billion in distributor rentals in Japan, according to the Motion Picture Producers Association of Japan.

== Legacy ==
Though this film was replaced by Ring 2 as the sequel to Ring, it was followed by a related installment 14 years later in Sadako 3D (2012), a loose adaptation of the Suzuki novel S, the fourth installment in the Ring series. S is canonically a sequel to the novel Spiral that this film is an adaptation of. That being said, the film has little coherent continuity with Spiral (or any of the other Ring films) outside of Takanori Ando, the protagonist of Sadako 3D, being the son of Mitsuo Ando, the protagonist of this film and the novel. That's partially because Suzuki's third novel, 1998's Loop, was never adapted into a film, leaving a huge gap of story in between these films.

== See also ==
- List of Japanese films of 1998
- List of horror films of 1998
