= Catharisis =

- Directed by: Katsumi Sakaguchi
- Starring: Rikiya Otaka
- Country of origin: Japan
- Original language: Japanese

Original release
- Release: 2003

Catharisis (カタルシス) is a made for TV Japanese film made in 2003 based on a true story, starring Rikiya Otaka and directed by Katsumi Sakaguchi.

== Plot ==
Naoki Ono, a 14-year-old boy murders a young girl in the suburbs of Tokyo. As a result, the large family change their names and live apart, while Naoki goes to a reformatory. Towako, his mother, stays away with her youngest son and youngest daughter, while her husband lives with other family. Three years later, Towako requests that the families reunite and go the island of her birth to be with her dying mother. Thus, the family are back together. But things aren't so simple. Katsumi, Naoki's sister hasn't been able to speak since her brother murdered the girl. Little Subaru (Otaka) has also suffered from the selfishness of his brother. And what of their uncle Satoshi and his family, his own son was killed. The family have never been a 'family' before ... Could Grandmother bring them all together?
