= Ring 0: Birthday =

2000 film by Noroi Tsuruta

- Japanese theatrical release poster
- Directed by: Norio Tsuruta
- Screenplay by: Hiroshi Takahashi
- Based on: Lemon Heart by Koji Suzuki
- Produced by: Shinji Ogawa; Masao Nagai; Takasige Ichise
- Starring: Yukie Nakama; Seiichi Tanabe; Kumiko Asō; Yoshiko Tanaka
- Cinematography: Takahide Shibanushi
- Edited by: Hiroshi Sunaga
- Music by: Shinichiro Ogata
- Production company: Ring 0 Production Group Production
- Distributed by: Toho Co., Ltd.
- Release date: January 22, 2000 (Japan)
- Running time: 99 minutes
- Country: Japan
- Language: Japanese

Ring 0: Birthday (Japanese: リング0 バースデイ, Hepburn: Ringu Zero: Bāsudei) is a 2000 Japanese supernatural psychological thriller film directed by Norio Tsuruta, from a screenplay by Hiroshi Takahashi, based on the short story "Lemon Heart" from the Birthday anthology by Koji Suzuki. A prequel to Ring (1998), the story follows the life of the character of Sadako Yamamura just before she consigned to her fate seen in the later Ring series.

Ring 0, along with Isola, was known for being one of the earliest Japanese live-action psychological thriller-focused films to be released theatrically, becoming the first in Japan to gross over ¥1 billion in distribution income, preceding other releases like The Beach (2000), Unbreakable (2000), Vanilla Sky (2001) and Panic Room (2001). Ring 0: Birthday was nominated for the 2001 edition of Fantasporto, but lost to Amores perros.

== Plot ==
In the present, a girl confesses to her friend that she watched the cursed videotape. She also recounts having nightmares, including seeing Sadako's murder by Dr. Ikuma.

30 years prior, Miyaji, the fiancé of a fellow reporter who was killed during Shizuko's infamous ESP demonstration, interviews Shizuko's daughter Sadako's former elementary school teacher Sudo, about Sadako's nensha powers. Sudo recounts how Sadako was withdrawn as a child and predicted her classmates drowning in the ocean during a field trip. Meanwhile, 19-year-old Sadako joins an acting troupe as an understudy. Her natural charisma infuriates the lead actress, Aiko, whose relationship with the troupe director, Shigemori, sours due to the latter's newfound favor for Sadako. Aiko is later found dead, having been haunted by a figure in white, so Sadako takes her place. Sadako and troupe sound director Hiroshi Toyama are attracted to each other, much to the disappointment of costume designer Etsuko Tachihara, who harbours feelings for Toyama. While praised by Shigemori and Toyama, the other troupe members grow to distrust and fear Sadako, as they suspect that she is the one who caused Aiko's death and other supernatural occurrences, including an apparition of a girl in white with long hair similar to Sadako's.

Miyaji is told by Sudo that Shizuko descended into madness before her suicide, ever since moving to live with Dr. Heihachiro Ikuma, and that Sudo heard strange childlike noises in the attic. Etsuko, wanting to discover Sadako's origins, contacts Sadako's psychiatrist, but he refuses to answer and throws away Sadako's troupe's poster; the poster is taken by Miyaji's assistant, allowing him and Miyaji to locate Sadako in the troupe. When they start photographing her, she telekinetically breaks the camera; the two discover that all the photographs contain ghostly faces and a girl with long hair, confirming Miyaji's suspicion of "two" Sadakos. Shigemori, obsessed with Sadako, says he will kill her first if she tries to kill him, and proceeds to strangle her. Toyama interrupts, and Shigemori is killed through a blow that also wounds Toyama. Sadako heals him just by touching him; later, she helps a disabled man regain his ability to walk. After finishing their last play, the two confess their love and promise to leave the troupe and live together.

The play is a disaster as Sadako, influenced by recordings of her mother's demonstration played by Etsuko, sees visions of her mother during the demonstration and kills her psychiatrist. The troupe members, discovering Shigemori's body, corner her and beat her to death. Pursuing the "second" Sadako, they visit Ikuma at his home, who tells them that Sadako split into two beings resembling each of her parents; the malevolent one, who resembles her unknown father, is kept from growing by Ikuma in the attic. Before they can kill it, both Sadakos merge and escape with Toyama. Sadako stalks and kills all the troupe members in her merged form, including Toyama. Miyaji and Etsuko hide in an empty cabin in the woods. Rather than face Sadako's wrath, Miyaji shoots Etsuko and herself.

Ikuma finds Sadako, who has recovered and is tearfully mourning her actions. Ikuma drugs her and chases her outside to the well. Despite her pleas, he brains her with an axe and throws her down the well before breaking down in tears. Sadako dreams of meeting Toyama again before waking, and screams as the stone lid of the well is slid into place, trapping her inside.

== Cast ==
- Yukie Nakama as Sadako Yamamura
- Yoshiko Tanaka as Akiko Miyaji
- Seiichi Tanabe as Hiroshi Toyama
- Kumiko Asō as Etsuko Tachihara
- Takeshi Wakamatsu as Yusaku Shigemori
- Ryushi Mizukami as Wataru Kuno
- Kaoru Okunuki as Aiko Hazuki
- Atsuko Takahata as Kaoru Arima
- Yasuji Kimura as Togashi
- Daisuke Ban as Heihachiro Ikuma
- Masako as Shizuko Yamamura
- Mahito Ōba as Takashi Yamamura
- Kazue Tsunogae as Mrs. Sudo

== Production ==
In 1999, Koji Suzuki concluded the Ring series by including a fourth entry titled Birthday, which collected three short stories that filled in details of the story. Asmik Ace decided to hire Ring and Ring 2 screenwriter Hiroshi Takahashi to adapt the short stories of Birthday, Takahashi decided to only adapt the story Lemonheart from Birthday due to the complex nature of the short story collection. Lemonheart captured the life of the character of Sadako just before she was consigned to the fate seen in the later Ring series. Hideo Nakata was offered to direct Ring 0, while Kenji Kawai was offered the chance to compose the music of the film by Takasige Ichise, the producer of Ring and Ring 2; however, both Nakata and Kawai turned down the offer.

Once Ring 0 went into production, numerous changes were made to the film production staff. The director for the film was the first change, as Nakata was replaced by Norio Tsuruta. Tsuruta had previously worked on direct-to-video horror scripts such as Honto ni atta kowai hanashi (Scary True Stories) in 1991, and wrote and directed the sequel. After working on two pachinko-themed feature films in between 1993 and 1994 and eight direct-to-video horror works between 1991 and 1996, Tsuruta subsequently took a hiatus for nearly three years. Tsuruta's first work after his hiatus was "Tatari", the second episode of the Kansai TV Tanpatsu drama Haunted School: Spring Haunting Special in March 1999, which Tsuruta directed while Takahashi took responsibility for the screenplay. Tsuruta was offered the chance to direct by Takahashi, due to their having previously collaborated on "Tatari". Tsuruta referred to the film as "a tragedy" with a theme about "a young woman who is oppressed because she is different from everyone else. In Japan, there is great pressure not to stray too far from the norm". The assistant director for Tsuruta would be Shozo Katashima. (Note: Katashima was previously collaborated with Yukihiko Tsutsumi in ai-ou and Shusuke Kaneko in Gamera: Guardian of the Universe.) The second change was the cinematographer, which would now be handled by Takahide Shibanushi. (Note: Shibanushi work as a cinematographer prior to the film, including the live-action movie adaption of Cat's Eye and Love & Pop.) The third change was the sound recording and reproduction director, which was previously handled by Kiyoshi Kakizawa in Ring 2; he was replaced by Tetsuo Segawa, a veteran sound recording director who started his sound recording career during the late Japanese New Wave era. (Note: Segawa work as the sound recording director prior to the film, including Tokyo Blackout, Akira, Heaven and Earth and Welcome Back, Mr. McDonald.) The fourth change was the sound effects director, which was handled by Kenji Shibazaki in Ring and Ring 2; however, Shibazaki was replaced by Shizuo Kurahashi, a veteran sound effects editor/designer when the film went into production. (Note: Kurahashi work as the sound effects director prior to the film, including Akira, Armitage III, The Vision of Escaflowne, Perfect Blue, Cowboy Bebop, Trigun and Cardcaptor Sakura.) The fifth change was the script supervisor, which was handled by Kumiko Yoshida in Ring 2; however, Yoshida was replaced by Yoshimi Amaike when the film went into production. (Note: Amaike work as the script supervisor prior to the film, including Pro Golfer Oribe Kinjiro film series and Owls' Castle.) The last change for the film production staff was the art director, which was handled by Iwao Saito on Ring, Spiral and Ring 2; however, Sato was replaced by Osamu Yamaguchi when the film went into production. (Note: Yamaguchi work as the art director prior to the film, including Summer Vacation 1999, Tasmania Story, Graduation Journey: I Came from Japan and Osaka Story.) Genre-wise, Ring 0 retained the J-Horror trappings found in Ring and Ring 2. However, the techno-horror genre that made Ring famous was now abandoned in favor of psychological thriller, a genre that many Hollywood directors as well as some East Asian filmmakers had already explored, such as David Fincher, David Lynch, Martin Scorsese, M. Night Shyamalan, Satoshi Kon and Kiyoshi Kurosawa, but many other East Asian filmmakers and screenwriters, including Tsuruta and Takahashi themselves, were not familiar with.

Yukie Nakama was cast in the role of Sadako. After Nakama's friends had seen Ring, they teased her about her resemblance to Sadako. Nakama was later contacted by her agent, who mentioned they were looking for actresses for the role of Sadako and tried out for the role. She received confirmation of her having been cast in the role two weeks later.

=== Music ===
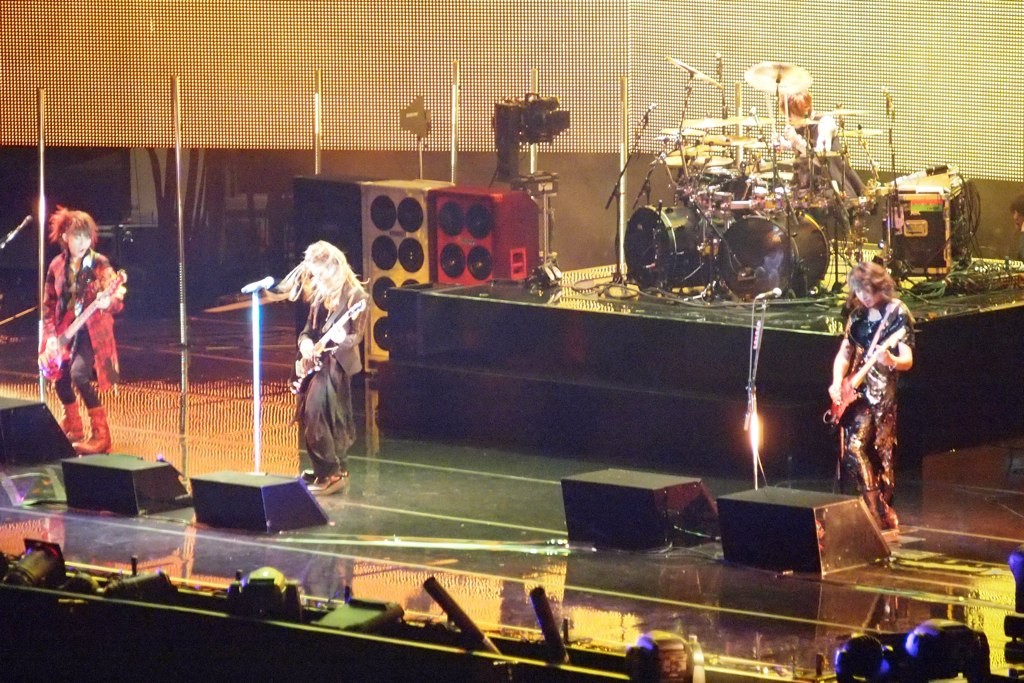
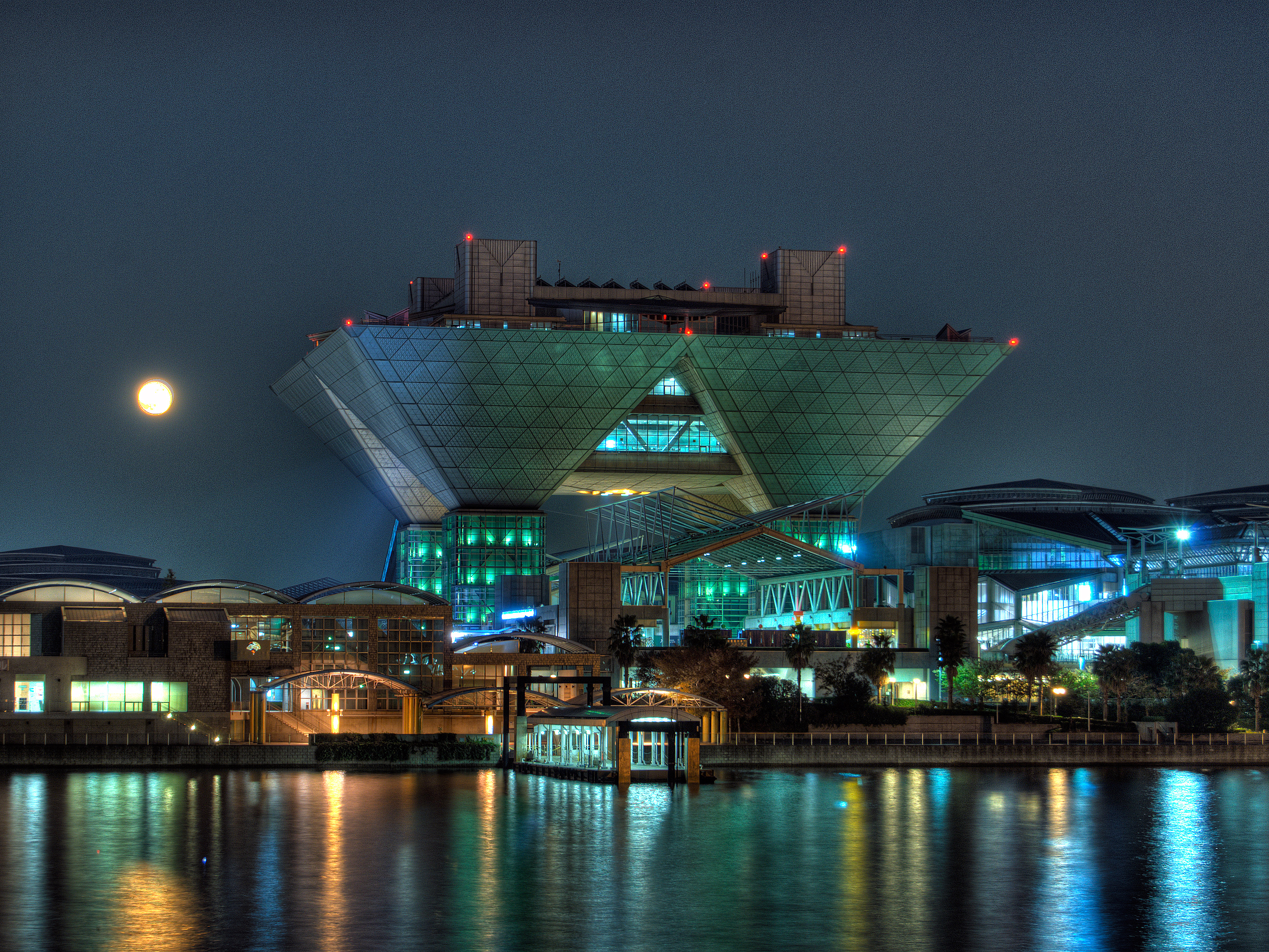
Rock band L'Arc-en-Ciel (pictured in 2012 at Madison Square Garden) sang finale the film's theme song, which performed for the first time on the "RESET>>LIVE *000" Concerts at the Tokyo Big Sight (pictured in 2007) on December 31, 1999.

"finale" by Japanese rock group L'Arc-en-Ciel, was used as the film official theme song, and it was released as Double A-side single, three days before the film's release. The band performed "finale" for the first time on the "RESET>>LIVE *000" Concerts at the Tokyo Big Sight on December 31, 1999. The music video of "finale" was directed by Wataru Takeishi, who previously directed many music video for the band including Winter Fall, Dive to Blue and Driver's High. Unlike many music videos from the songs that were a part of a film soundtrack or featured in a film at that time (such as "I Disappear" by Metallica and "Take a Look Around" by Limp Bizkit, both from Mission: Impossible 2), The music video of "Finale" was developed as an independent L'Arc-en-Ciel clip devoid of any footage from the film, since the music video of "Finale" was entirely filmed in various locations in the island of Hawaiʻi, including South Point Complex, Kīlauea and Mauna Kea Observatories. Because the video did not feature any clips from the movie, it was not included on any of the DVD releases of the film, and it was included in the band's second video compilation Chronicle 2, released on March 28, 2001 instead. the full track version of "finale" was appeared on the band's eighth studio album, "Real". while the four minute long theatrical cut version of "finale" would only appear in the Closing credits of Ring 0: Birthday, as well as a live performance on music TV shows, such as Music Station and Count Down TV; it was not included in the film's official soundtrack CD released by Kadokawa Shoten Publishing. Furthermore, the name of the theme song was kept secret on all print advertisements, posters, television commercials and press material for Ring 0: Birthday, except the theatrical pamphlet and the double feature trailers, as a part of Sony Music Entertainment Japan's decision to use several marketing tactics for "Neo Universe/Finale" to increase sales.

== Release ==
Ring 0: Birthday was released in Japan on January 22, 2000, where it was distributed by Toho. It was released on a double bill with Isola. The film received its North American premiere at the Fantasia International Film Festival in Montreal in July 2000.

Its United Kingdom premiere followed at the Edinburgh International Film Festival in August 2000, where it was screened alongside Ring (1998) and Ring 2 (1999). The film was theatrically released in Malaysia as Ring 0: The Origin on December 19, 2002, where it was distributed by Buena Vista-Columbia TriStar Distribution Joint Venture. In South Korea, Ring 0: Birthday was released theatrically on 11 April 2003, distributed by Dong-A Export Company. In the Philippines, the film was theatrically released as Ring-0: The Birthday on May 21, 2003.

=== Home media ===
Ring 0: Birthday was released on VHS and DVD format shortly after its theatrical run in Japan, with a NTSC-J region VHS released first on July 21, 2000, followed by the Region 2-locked DVD released on October 27, 2000, both from Kadokawa Video. The 2000 Kadokawa Video DVD release presented the film in its original 1.85:1 Anamorphic widescreen format with Japanese Dolby Digital 5.1 soundtrack, and included the extra features that were unavailable on the VHS released, including the cast and crew interviews, behind-the-scenes featurettes, Deleted scenes, theatrical trailers and TV commercial/teasers for the film.

The film was released in United Kingdom as a straight-to-video release by Tartan Video (under their Asia Extreme Label) on February 25, 2002, in both VHS and Region 0-DVD format. The 2002 Tartan Asia Extreme release presented the film in its original 1.85:1 anamorphic widescreen format, though it carried no special features apart from filmographies, photo galleries and trailers for other Tartan Asia Extreme releases.

On April 28, 2003 Madman Entertainment and The AV Channel co-announced that Ring 0: Birthday would release in Australia through the Eastern Eye Label as a straight-to-video release in June 11 of that same year on both VHS and Region 0-DVD format. The 2003 Madman/Eastern Eye release presented the film in the 1.78:1 anamorphic widescreen format instead of the original 1.85:1 anamorphic format found in the Kadokawa Video and the Tartan Asia Extreme release, and carried no special features apart from filmographies, photo galleries and trailers for Hellsing, Samsara, Spirited Away, Vampire Hunter D: Bloodlust and Wendigo. There is an easter egg located in the extras features menu. When the Madman Propaganda is highlighted, the viewer can press the left directional button to highlight a Kanji character on the girl's tongue, then press the Enter button. By doing this, the cursed video used in the previous films will play. In France, Ring 0 was released on DVD by StudioCanal on 7 October 2003. In Italy, Dynamic Italia released a standalone DVD edition on 15 October 2003.

Tartan later released the film as a part of The Ring Trilogy DVD boxset on October 25, 2004, in both 3-Disc Keep case Standard Edition (the Ring and Ring 2 discs are region-free, while the Ring 0: Birthday disc is region 2-locked; all discs include the same special features found on the 2002 Tartan Asia Extreme release) and 4-Disc Region 2-locked DVD Digipak Remastered-Collector's Edition (including the additional disc which contains Sleeping Bride and the inclusion of the DTS 5.1 soundtrack option in all discs (the DTS 5.1 soundtrack are recorded at a bitrate of 768 kbit/s), both of which are unavailable in the Standard Edition). The 2004 The Ring Trilogy Collector's Edition Released of Ring 0: Birthday presented the film in the 1.78:1 Anamorphic widescreen format found in the Madman/Eastern Eye release, and contain special features including film notes by Kim Newman and three extra features found in the 2000 Kadokawa Video DVD release: behind-the-scenes featurettes, deleted scenes and theatrical trailers. The 2004 The Ring Trilogy Collector's Edition release of the film also included the Dolby Digital 5.1 (recorded at a bitrate of 384 kbit/s) and DTS 5.1 soundtrack option (Both in Japanese), in addition to the Japanese Dolby Digital 2.0 Stereo soundtrack (recorded at a bitrate of 192 kbit/s) found in the 2002 Tartan Asia Extreme release. The film was released direct-to-video in the United States under the title Ringu 0 on August 23, 2005, by DreamWorks/Universal Home Video. In 2019, Arrow Films included the film in its Ring Collection Blu-ray box set, released in the United Kingdom on 18 March and the United States on 29 October. In Germany, Plaion Pictures released a standalone Blu-ray edition on 19 December 2023 as part of its J-Horror Collection series.

== Reception ==
The online film database AllMovie gave the film two stars out of five, referring to it as a "mediocre Carrie rip" and that it "can only be truly reviled as a desecration of the original Ringu's uniquely persuasive and subtle horror". The review noted that the "film's effort to explain exactly who Sadako (Yukie Nakama) is and how she became a powerful evil force, the film heaps contrivance upon contrivance, mixing clichés from backstage melodramas with those from Carrie and all its imitators, and leaving the viewer with little beyond the strength of Nakama's appealing performance and a few mild scares to hang on to".

The film opened in third place at the Japanese box office.

== See also ==
- List of horror films of 2000
- List of Japanese films of 2000
