= Koji Suzuki =

Japanese writer (1957–2026)

Koji Suzuki 鈴木 光司
- Born: Suzuki Kōji; May 13, 1957; Hamamatsu, Shizuoka, Japan
- Died: May 8, 2026 (aged 68); Tokyo, Japan
- Occupation: Writer
- Writing career
- Language: Japanese
- Period: 1990–2026
- Genres: Horror, thriller, fantasy, science fiction
- Notable works: Ring (1991); Dark Water (1996); Edge (2008)
- Notable awards: Shirley Jackson Award (2012); Bram Stoker Award for Lifetime Achievement (2022)

Koji Suzuki (鈴木 光司, Suzuki Kōji; May 13, 1957 – May 8, 2026) was a Japanese writer, who was born in Hamamatsu and lived in Tokyo. Suzuki was the author of the Ring novels, which have been adapted into other formats, including films, manga, television series, and video games. He wrote several books on the subject of fatherhood. His hobbies included traveling, motorcycling, as well as sailing.

He graduated from Keio University before debuting as a novelist. Koji Suzuki died in Tokyo on May 8, 2026, at the age of 68.

== Bibliography ==
Some of the books listed here are published in the US by Vertical Inc., owned by Kodansha and Dai Nippon Printing.

=== Ring series ===
- Ring (Ringu) (1991)
- Spiral (Rasen) (1995)
- Loop (Rupu) (1998)
- Birthday (Bāsudei) (1999) (Short story collection)
  - "Coffin in the Sky" [details what happened to Mai Takano in Spiral]
  - "Lemon Heart" [prequel to Ring]
  - "Happy Birthday" [a direct epilogue to Loop]
- S (Esu) (2012)
- Tide (Taido) (2013)

=== Standalone novels ===
- Paradise (Rakuen) (1990)
- The Shining Sea (Hikari sasu umi) (1993)
  - republished – The Shining Sea (2022 Vertical Publishing) – ISBN 978-1647291181
- Promenade of the Gods (Kamigami no Promenade) (2003)
- Edge (2008)
- Ubiquitous (2025)

=== Short story collections ===
- Death and the Flower (1995)
  - "Disposable Diapers and a Race Replica"
  - "Irregular Breathing"
  - "Key West"
  - "Beyond the Darkness"
  - "Embrace"
  - "Avidya"
- Dark Water (Honogurai mizu no soko kara) (1996) (includes an original framing story)
  - "Floating Water"
  - "Solitary Isle"
  - "The Hold"
  - "Dream Cruise"
  - "Adrift"
  - "Watercolors"
  - "Forest Under the Sea"

=== Short story ===
- "Drop" (2009) – Printed on three rolls of toilet paper in Japan in Japanese and in English in 2012.

== Films adapted from his works ==
- Ring (Ringu, a.k.a. Ringu: Kanzenban) (1995)
- Ring (Ringu) (1998)
- Spiral (Rasen) (1998)
- The Ring Virus (1999)
- Ring 2 (Ringu 2) (1999)
- Ring 0: Birthday (Ringu 0: Bāsudei) (2000)
- Dark Water (2002)
- The Ring (2002)
- Dark Water (2005)
- Rings (short film) (2005)
- The Ring Two (2005)
- Open Water 2: Adrift (2006)
- Masters of Horror (TV, episode 2.13 Dream Cruise) (2007)
- Sadako 3D (2012)
- Sadako 3D 2 (2013)
- Sadako vs. Kayako (2016)
- Rings (2017)
- Sadako (2019)
- Sadako DX (2022)

== Awards and nominations ==
=== Japanese awards ===
- 1990 Japan Fantasy Novel Award: Paradise
- 1996 Yoshikawa Eiji Prize for New Writers: Spiral
- 1996 Nominee for Naoki Prize: Dark Water
- 1996 Nominee for Izumi Kyōka Prize for Literature: Dark Water
- 1998 Nominee for Japanese SF Award: Loop

=== U.S. award ===
- 2012 Shirley Jackson Award for Best Novel: Edge

=== International award ===
- 2021 Bram Stoker Award for Lifetime Achievement
