= Hitomi Sato (actress) =

Japanese actress (born 1979)

Hitomi Satō
- Born: 10 October 1979 (age 46); Nagoya, Japan
- Occupation: Actress
- Years active: 1996–present
- Spouse: Kei Hosogai (m. 2019; div. 2023)

Hitomi Satō (佐藤仁美, Satō Hitomi; born 10 October 1979) is a Japanese actress. She has appeared in more than forty films since 1996.

On October 10, 2019, she married actor Kei Hosogai. They divorced on February 23, 2023.

== Selected filmography ==
=== Film ===
Year	Title	Role	Notes	Ref.
1998	Ring	Masami Kurahashi		
1999	Ring 2	Masami Kurahashi		
2002	The Cat Returns		Voice only	
2003	Doppelganger			
2010	A Boy and His Samurai			
2011	Rock: Wanko no Shima			
2016	Madou: After the Rain	Izumi Ishikawa	Lead role	
2019	Sadako	Masami Kurahashi		
2026	Kyojo: Reunion			
2026	Kyojo: Requiem			

=== TV ===
Year	Title	Role	Notes
2000	The Sun Never Sets	Yuko Masaki	
2001	R-17		
2006	Journey Under the Midnight Sun		
2008	Kiri no Hi		
2011	Kaseifu no Mita		

=== Video games ===
Year	Title	Role	Notes
1998	Murder on the Eurasia Express		
