= S (Suzuki novel) =

2012 novel by Koji Suzuki

- Author: Koji Suzuki
- Original title: S (エス, Esu)
- Translator: Greg Gencarello
- Language: Japanese
- Series: Ring
- Genre: Horror
- Publisher: Kadokawa Shoten
- Publication date: May 12, 2012
- Publication place: Japan
- English publication date: December 19, 2017
- Media type: Print
- Pages: 295
- Preceded by: Birthday
- Followed by: Tide

S is the fifth novel in the Ring series by Koji Suzuki. It served as the basis of the film Sadako 3D and Sadako 3D 2.

The novel was released in English on December 19, 2017, under the title S (Es). It was also released in French on April 10, 2014, and is sold under the title Sadako.

== Plot ==
25 years after the events of Spiral, Takanori Ando, graphic designer at Studio Oz, a CG production company, is dating high school teacher Akane Maruyama. He plans to marry Akane, who is pregnant with his child, to hide the fact that he impregnated her out of wedlock.

Company president Yoneda gives Takanori a USB drive with a recent viral video of a man committing suicide by hanging to reconfigure for a future project. Watching the file on his laptop, Takanori realizes that it is different from the 'viral' one. The suicidal man's body is positioned lower, revealing his neck. When inquired, Yoneda tells Takanori that it was given to him by Kiyomi Sakata, producer of the latest film that Studio Oz is working on. Meanwhile, Akane feels stalked by a figure. During an encounter at the high school where she works, she faints and is taken to a hospital, where she briefly hallucinates meeting her deceased mother.

One day, Akane unwittingly watches a copy of the suicide video. Consoling her, Takanori discovers that the video has changed further: the body is lowered to the extent that the man's face and the noose are now visible. The man is revealed to be Seiji Kashiwada, a serial killer convicted and executed a month ago for murdering four girls. Akane reveals that she was his potential fifth victim. To placate her, Takanori promises to keep track of her using a GPS. Analyzing the video, Takanori deduces the location where it was shot and heads there, finding out that the room is currently occupied by a man named Hiroyuki Niimura.

Takanori seeks the help of Tsuyoshi Kihara, who once researched the Kashiwada case. Kihara opines that Kashiwada was not truly guilty. From the video and the crime scene photos of Kashiwada's house, the two notice a first-edition copy of Ring, a book written by Kazuyuki Asakawa and published by his brother Junichi 25 years ago. Digging into the Ring case, Takanori is surprised to find his father Mitsuo, who now heads a private hospital, was involved.

Mitsuo explains the events leading to the ring virus' propagation but insists it is now extinct. Takanori suspects that Mitsuo is hiding something, especially after he gives an ambiguous answer about why the family registry mistakenly lists Takanori as being dead. Takanori suspects he had died at the age of 3 but somehow resurrected two years afterward.

Further into his research, Takanori realizes that he has met Kashiwada, known as Ryuji Takayama, years ago. Considering the physical similarities of Kashiwada's victims, Kihara theorizes that they were all clones of Sadako Yamamura, the originator of the ring virus. Kashiwada might be hunting Sadako clones and Akane is also a Sadako clone. During the premiere of Studio Oz's latest film, Takanori learns that Sakata's maiden name is Niimura. Requesting his friend to hack into her emails, Takanori connects to the emails of Hiroyuki, who is revealed to be Sakata's son. Hiroyuki keeps photos of the girls Kashiwada supposedly murdered, plus Akane's. Takanori realizes that Kashiwada was framed and Hiroyuki was the real serial killer.

The night after, Takanori loses track of Akane's GPS. His laptop turns on and plays the suicide video, only this time Seiji is not hanged. Seiji confirms that he is Ryuji. He admits sending Sakata the video and recounts events surrounding the Ring virus. Akane arrives shortly, prompting Ryuji to reveal his secret: he fathered her with Masako Maruyama, the alias of the Sadako clone born from Mai Takano. As a result, Akane is not truly a clone, as she was conceived sexually, so could survive where the Sadako clones could not. Ryuji was the one who ended the ring virus for good; by stopping the film adaptation, destroying the first edition copies of Ring, and reprinting them with the cure formula, he managed to stop the virus from propagating. He relented to allow four Sadako clones to exist, but all of them ended up being murdered by Hiroyuki, a former student of his. Ryuji managed to save Akane, but in the process implicated the real Seiji Kashiwada, whom he impersonated and as a result, was wrongly arrested and executed. Bidding farewell to them, Ryuji states that he will return to the "world where he came from".

The next day, Takanori receives news of Hiroyuki's suicide in a train station, though he has a feeling that Akane is involved. Months later, Takanori and Akane hold their wedding. As Akane heads to her high school free from having to hide her pregnancy, she hears some girls discussing a rumor about a cursed video, hinting that the curse is about to start again.
