= Ring (novel series) =

Six-novel series by Koji Suzuki

- Ring; Spiral; Loop; Birthday; S; Tide
- Author: Koji Suzuki
- Original title: リング
- Country: Japan
- Language: Japanese
- Genre: Horror
- Published: 1991–2013
- Media type: Print
- No. of books: 6

Ring (リング, Ringu) is a series of horror novels written by Koji Suzuki. The novels were initially a trilogy, consisting of Ring, Spiral, and Loop. A short story collection called Birthday was released shortly after, introducing extra stories interconnecting the trilogy. Two further books, S and Tide, were published in 2012 and 2013, respectively.

The novels revolve around a curse, embodied within a videotape, unleashed by Sadako Yamamura, the ghost of a psychic who was raped and murdered before being thrown into a well.

The success of the novels led to the release of numerous film adaptations in Japan, South Korea, and the United States.

== Books ==
=== Ring (1991) ===
This story is set in present-day Yokohama. When four teenagers mysteriously die one night at the same time, Kazuyuki Asakawa, a journalist and uncle to one of the teens, takes a particular interest in the case and investigates. This leads him to a holiday resort called South Hakone Pacific Land, where the four teens stayed one week before their death. There he watches a videotape left behind in their room which contains a series of abstract and realistic images. At the end of the sequence of cryptic and disturbing images, a warning appears: "The one who saw these images is destined to die in one week at this time. If you do not wish to die, do as will be said from now on. That is—" but the rest is erased by a TV commercial. This has a strange mental effect on Kazuyuki, who immediately believes that the tape has now placed its mark on him.

He enlists the help of his best friend, Ryuji Takayama, a philosophy graduate and a self-described rapist. When Ryuji hears Kazuyuki's story, he watches the tape, and asks Kazuyuki to make him a copy for him to study at home. After Kazuyuki's wife and child also watch the tape, Kazuyuki realises he must find the truth and perform the "charm" to prevent the deaths of both his family and his friend.

Their investigations lead them to search for a girl named Sadako Yamamura and lead them to the volcanic island of Oshima. Sadako was the daughter of Shizuko Yamamura, who was known for her exceptional ESP abilities but later branded as a charlatan. In depression, Shizuko jumped into Mount Mihara's crater. Later they learn that Sadako, who lived 30 years ago, was still missing. The evidence leads them back to South Hakone where they find a well. At the bottom lie Sadako's remains; Ryuji and Kazuyuki set her free by retrieving her remains from the well. Thinking they have performed the charm, Ryuji and Kazuyuki are convinced, Ryuji returns home while Kazuyuki goes to Izu-Oshima to return Sadako's remains to her relatives for a proper burial.

At Ryuji's deadline, he is working on his academic papers. He dials Mai Takano, his assistant, but only manages to let out a scream as he is killed by the curse by being shown a reflection of himself aged by 100 years in a mirror. When Kazuyuki receives Ryuji's posthumous hint that the cure may have to do with the virus wanting to reproduce and surmises that the charm was to copy the tape and show it to somebody else, he rushes to his family to save them.

=== Spiral (1995) ===
The events in the story begin a day after Ryuji's death. By chance, Mitsuo Ando, bereaved parent and Ryuji's former university classmate, is assigned to do the autopsy of Ryuji. He and his colleague, Miyashita, found a benign tumor in Ryuji's throat which is believed to be the cause of his death. They are puzzled because the tumor that they find resembles a smallpox tumor that was eradicated 30 years ago. Ando, along with his colleague, Miyashita, find out that an organism they eventually name the Ring Virus causes this tumor. The virus is transferred to the body through the tape and begins to grow into a tumor inside the viewer's throat. When the charm is not performed, the tumor grows until it blocks the airway and kills the person. To stop this, the tape must be copied and shown to another person. Inside his stomach they find the word RING and a series of cryptic messages. This further perplexes Ando.

In search for the cryptic messages meaning, he comes to meet Ryuji's assistant, Mai Takano. Mai, who seems to know something about the videotape, tells Ando about the curse but is unsure how Ryuji died. As a scientist, Ando laughs at Mai's explanation. He goes to talk to Kazuyuki Asakawa but finds that he and his family were involved in a car accident. It is discovered that Kazuyuki's wife and child were dead before the crash. Kazuyuki is critically wounded and unable to talk. At the accident site there lies a crushed videotape. When Mai suddenly disappears, Ando is further motivated to investigate. He stumbles upon Kazuyuki's files which contain the title, RING. He is uncertain about the discovery because it contains supernatural explanations and contradicts scientific ones.

The virus mutated and uses the report as a medium. After reading the report, Ando has thoughts of Sadako and the well. Through a series of events, he is led to the well in Hakone.

Days after Mai's disappearance, he meets a beautiful woman named Masako who introduced herself as Mai's older sister. He falls in love with her months later. In doing so, they make love one night and Masako ends up pregnant. Later he finds out that Masako and Sadako are the same. One night he receives a letter from Sadako stating the circumstances of her revival and what she wants from Ando. Sadako offers to bring back Ando's son in return for his not interference in the publishing of RING through Kazuyuki's brothers publishing agency. Ando chooses to cooperate with Sadako and the novel ends with a newly resurrected Ryuji providing a vaccine of the Ring virus to Ando and his resurrected son.

=== Loop (1998) ===
A medical student named Kaoru Futami has a father who has contracted a deadly disease called Metastatic Human Cancer (MHC), a cancer involving both animals and plants. He discovers that his father was involved in a massive supercomputer project named LOOP. The LOOP was a computer simulation of the emergence of life but that did not succeed. It is known that everyone who was involved in the LOOP has died by the same type of cancer.

In the course of events, Kaoru meets a woman named Reiko and falls in love with her. They sleep together, and Reiko becomes pregnant, which makes Reiko vulnerable to MHC. Kaoru continues his investigations, which lead him to a man (and the last surviving person involved in the LOOP) named Amano. Amano reveals that LOOP was a project involving 100 supercomputers strung together and aiming to recreate life. Amano tells Kaoru of a lab in New Mexico where another scientist might be alive. Kaoru goes there only to find the scientist dead. Then, he enters the lab and finds a pair of virtual reality goggles and gloves. He tried it, and minutes later he is in the LOOP.

In the LOOP, he sees everything, but one event intrigues him, the emergence of the Ring Virus. He sees in detail all the events of the previous novels from different angles. After some discussion with Amano, he knows that the LOOP's creator wanted to recreate Ryuji's death and in so doing could clone him and insert him into someone's womb. The cloned Ryuji, however, had the Ring Virus in him. When Ryuji was born, the virus escaped and mutated into MHC.

Kaoru is desperate to find a cure for MHC, but he encounters a storm that leaves him dying. He is saved by an old man named Cristoph Eliot, the leader of the LOOP project. He reveals that Kaoru was Ryuji's clone and so has an exceptional gift, immunity to MHC.

Kaoru has to be analyzed so that his immunity can be understood. An analysis machine is created. The analyzed object, however, has to be molecularized in order to be scanned accurately, meaning that Kaoru might die. Heroically, he agrees to this.

The old man transfers Kaoru's analyzed molecules into the LOOP. He promises that Reiko, his wife, can see him through the VR Goggles and that she will not be alone. In the LOOP, Kaoru is reborn through Sadako as Ryuji. He creates a vaccine for the Ring virus which he gives to Ando, re-enacting the epilogue of Spiral. The book ends with Kaoru/Ryuji sitting watching the stars, thinking that Reiko is watching over him.

=== Birthday (1999) ===
This short story collection consists of stories related to the Ring novels. It was also meant to be the conclusion to the Ring series at the time.

Floating Coffin – these are the final moments of Mai Takano's life after disappearing during the events of Spiral.

It begins when she watches the tape. She starts ovulating then, and Sadako's DNA is planted in Mai's eggs. After viewing the tape, she feels nausea. Unknown to her, Sadako is being conceived in her womb. Days later, Sadako has total control of Mai since she lacks the will to resist. Exactly seven days after viewing the tape, Mai gives birth to a baby Sadako. When Sadako is reborn, she kills Mai with her psychic powers.

Lemon Heart – the second story of the collection tells the story of Sadako when she was 19 years old in Tokyo. This is 30 years prior to Ring.

When Sadako graduated from high school, she joined the Hiroshi Acting Troupe as an apprentice. As days go by, she falls in love with Toyama, the soundman. Once, she is caught performing nensha with a turned-off TV. This alienates her from the group. While Sadako and Toyama are intimate, their conversation is accidentally recorded. When a member plays this recording to the rest of the troupe, much drama ensues. Because of these events, Sadako flees to Hakone to her father, who is in the hospital. It is later revealed that all who heard the recording died years later under mysterious circumstances.

At a well, a doctor rapes her, but she defends herself with a psychic attack on the doctor. He retaliates by strangling Sadako, which incapacitates her power. Helpless, she is thrown into the well. As she dies, she has a vision of being reborn inside Mai Takano's womb, which occurs in the first story.

Happy Birthday – the final story develops the plot of the last novel, Loop, while incorporating new information disclosed in the previous two short stories. It depicts the last events taking place in the Ring universe chronologically and is also the conclusion of the series.

Reiko is questioning the worth of giving birth to a child if the only world he'll arrive in is full of death. Her older son has died, and the father of her unborn child still missing. There she goes to a lab and learn the final secrets of the LOOP.

=== S (2012) ===
S is a 2012 Koji Suzuki novel and the fifth entry of the series.

Following on the story told in the series of novels that began with the runaway bestseller Ring, this work starts with 28-year-old image processing specialist Takanori Ando being handed a USB memory stick by the president of the CG production company where he works. Tasked with analyzing its contents, Ando gasps at the graphic images he sees, and quickly concludes that they cannot have been faked or generated by CG software. Assuming the man in the video did indeed kill himself, what could his purpose have been in leaving this footage behind? Ando saves the file to his PC. When he plays it again the next day, the man's body has shifted to a lower position, and in subsequent viewings, the video undergoes further changes. Meanwhile, Ando's fiancée Akane Maruyama, a 24-year-old high-school teacher, learns she is pregnant with his child. When she is at Ando's apartment, she is drawn as if by an irresistible force to watch the suicide video on his PC. After examining the video more closely, Ando manages to identify the apartment building where he believes it was filmed. He also realizes that someone is following him, though intermittently, and that he may in fact be in danger. The man who holds the key to the story is philosophy instructor Ryuji Takayama, who appeared in previous volumes of the series. Twenty-five years ago, Takayama had died after watching a video that transmitted a curse, but, miraculously returning to life, he has been battling the evil villainess Sadako to prevent the Sadako Virus from spreading. Akane is in fact Takayama's child by a woman who carries Sadako's DNA, and the man who kills himself in the suicide video is a way of informing Ando about the intervening events.

=== Tide (2013) ===
The sixth and final entry in the series, Tide is linked most directly to Loop.

Cram-school math instructor Seiji Kashiwada is a creation of the supercomputer LOOP, and the biological information implanted in him reflects the lives of Ryuji Takayama, who appeared in both Ring and Loop, and Kaoru Futami, who appeared in the latter volume; but due to a system error, portions of his memory have become lost. One day, student Rie Yoshina comes to him for advice regarding her friend Haruna Tajima, who inexplicably fell into a coma after seeing a female dogu figurine of the Jomon Period (ca. 12,000–300 BCE) depicting the release of a snake. It is a baffling story, but as he listens to Rie's account, Seiji senses intuitively that it is a message directed at him. As if guided by some unknown force, he begins going back over the events that took place in Ring. The reader learns about the conflicts between Shizuko Yamamura and her daughter Sadako, who were central to the events; about the early years of the ancient ascetic who gave Shizuko her special powers; and about the surprising secret of Ryuji Takayama's birth. In the process, Seiji becomes one with Ryuji, and begins filling in the missing pieces of his memory. At the same time, he comes to feel a connection with the unbroken tides of human passion and memory that have ebbed and flowed since time immemorial, and in turn, to understand why he has been given life in this world.

== Ring references in pop culture ==
The 2003 film Scary Movie 3 significantly parodies the American remake film The Ring.

The 2006 video game Yakuza 2 has a side quest involving Kiryu watching a haunted VHS tape and beginning to see the woman from the tape, only for her to disappear. He is told the only way to get rid of the curse is to pay 100,000 yen to an exorcist, but after doing so, he discovers it was a scam. Later, he catches the exorcist and comments that having a woman show up and vanish was clever, only for the exorcist to claim he never hired anyone to do that, implying the tape was actually haunted. The quest also shows up in the 2017 remake Yakuza Kiwami 2, this time ending with the woman showing up behind Kiryu and scaring away the fake exorcist, but then vanishing when Kiryu chooses to throw out the cursed tape.

The 2013 season 5 episode of Castle, "Scared to Death", contains a haunted DVD so scary that it kills people three days after they watch it. The episode makes a direct comparison between the curse and The Ring.
