= Loop (novel) =

1998 novel by Koji Suzuki

- Author: Koji Suzuki
- Original title: Loop (ループ, Rūpu)
- Translator: Glynne Walley
- Cover artist: Chip Kidd
- Language: Japanese
- Series: Ring
- Genre: Horror, science fiction
- Publisher: Kadokawa Shoten, Vertical, Inc.
- Publication date: 1998
- Publication place: Japan
- English publication date: 2006
- Media type: Paperback
- Preceded by: Spiral
- Followed by: Birthday

Loop (ループ, Rūpu) is a horror novel by Japanese writer Koji Suzuki, and the third in his series of Ring.

The story revolves around a simulated reality, exactly the same as our own, known as the Loop: created to simulate the emergence and evolution of life. It is in this alternate universe that the events of the previous novels, Ring and Spiral, took place.

Loop is the only book in the series to have not been the basis of any Ring films. However, the 2000 video game The Ring: Terror's Realm borrows a few elements from it, including a simulated reality called the Loop.

== Plot ==
The story revolves around a medical student named Kaoru Futami. His father, Hideyuki, contracts a deadly disease known as Metastatic Human Cancer (MHC). This terminal cancer affects all forms of organic life: humans, animals, and plants. Events lead Hideyuki to tell Kaoru more about a research program he was involved in called the LOOP project: a virtual reality simulator meant to represent the emergence of life and how the world most likely evolved. It is known that almost everyone who was involved in the LOOP project has died of the same cancer.

Kaoru takes a part-time job tutoring a boy named Ryoji, an asymptomatic carrier of MHC, and his mother, Reiko. Despite her being 15 years his senior, Kaoru falls in love with Reiko. Eventually, they begin an affair once Ryoji begins chemotherapy. When he finds out, Ryoji commits suicide by falling backwards out of a 12-story building. One month later, Kaoru learns from Reiko that she may be pregnant with Kaoru's child. He also reads Ryoji's suicide note, in which he explains his motivation for taking his own life.

As Kaoru continues his investigation into the LOOP project, his father asks him to meet a microbiologist named Amano, who was involved in the final stages of LOOP before it was scrapped. Amano reveals that LOOP utilized a hundred supercomputers strung together to recreate life, and tells Kaoru of a scientist in New Mexico who might still be alive. Kaoru's mother, Machiko, convinces him to go to New Mexico after relating a tale of the "Ancient One" who has a thousand eyes watching.

Kaoru then ventures to New Mexico, only to find the scientist dead. However, inside the scientist's lab, the computer turns itself on and tells Kaoru to put on a pair of virtual reality goggles and gloves, which brings him into the LOOP simulation. Kaoru experiences the life of a Native American who has a wife and two children and is brutally murdered by white colonisers. Coming out of the simulation, Kaoru calls Amano and asks for the coordinates of the events that are crucial to the LOOP evolution: the lives of Asakawa, Takayama, and Yamamura. Amano pinpoints the exact coordinates of the events that take place. He also explains how Kaoru can merge consciousness with people in LOOP or watch from afar like a ghost. He then finds out, in complete detail, events from the previous novels, navigating from different angles. First, he looks at things from Ryuji's eyes, then Asakawa, finally settling on a character named Ando, who discovers the truth about Sadako.

Soon after, he has another discussion with Amano, who knows that the LOOP's creator intends to recreate Ryuji's death. By doing so, he could create a clone and insert it into a woman's womb. But they forgot that Ryuji's clone would carry the Ring Virus with his genes. Therefore, when Ryuji was reborn, the virus escaped and mutated into the MHC virus.

Desperate to find the cure for the MHC virus, Kaoru ventures deeper west into the desert only to encounter a storm that leaves him on the verge of death. He is then saved by an old man named Eliot, who has purposefully crafted all the events to bring Kaoru to him. After resurrecting Kaoru, the man explains what happened and that Kaoru is Ryuji's clone. As a result, Kaoru has an exceptional gift of immunity to the MHC virus. To stop the virus from destroying the real world, Kaoru is sent back to the LOOP world as the one who solves (and eventually stops) the Ring virus. One of the main problems is that he cannot return to the real world to see his father (still in the hospital) or Reiko ever again. To save them, he agrees.

Upon accepting, the old man transfers Kaoru's analyzed molecules into the LOOP, where he promises Reiko can see him. In the LOOP, Kaoru solves the problem with Ando's help. He watches Ando's resurrected son play in the water. Once Ando leaves, Kaoru looks up at the stars, wondering about Reiko.

== See also ==
- Horror fiction
- Gothic fiction
- Japanese literature
- Ring
