= Ring (film) =

1998 Japanese horror film by Hideo Nakata

- Japanese theatrical release poster

Japanese name
- Katakana: リング
Transcriptions
- Revised Hepburn: Ringu
- Directed by: Hideo Nakata
- Screenplay by: Hiroshi Takahashi
- Based on: Ring by Koji Suzuki
- Produced by: Shinya Kawai; Taka Ichise; Takenori Sento
- Starring: Nanako Matsushima; Miki Nakatani; Yuko Takeuchi; Hitomi Sato; Yoichi Numata; Hiroyuki Sanada
- Cinematography: Junichiro Hayashi
- Edited by: Nobuyuki Takahashi
- Music by: Kenji Kawai
- Production company: Ring/Spiral Production Committee
- Distributed by: Toho
- Release date: January 31, 1998 (Japan)
- Running time: 95 minutes
- Country: Japan
- Language: Japanese
- Budget: $1.5 million
- Box office: $19.5 million (est.)

Ring (Japanese: リング, Hepburn: Ringu) is a 1998 Japanese supernatural psychological horror film directed by Hideo Nakata and written by Hiroshi Takahashi, based on the 1991 novel by Koji Suzuki. The film stars Nanako Matsushima, Miki Nakatani, and Hiroyuki Sanada, and follows a reporter who is racing to investigate the mystery behind a cursed video tape; whoever watches the tape dies seven days after doing so. The film is also titled The Ring (stylized as the Ring) in Japan and was released in North America as Ringu.

Production took approximately nine months, and the film was shot back-to-back with a sequel, Spiral, featuring much of the same cast but involving neither Nakata nor Takahashi; both films were released together in Japan on January 31, 1998, with the studio hoping for the popularity of the novel to make both films successful. After its release, Ring was a box office hit in Japan and internationally and was acclaimed by critics, who praised its atmosphere, slow-paced horror and themes.

Spawning a popular franchise, the film has been highly influential, triggering both a western popularization of Japanese horror, including with its own English-language adaptations starting with 2002's The Ring, and a renaissance of Japanese horror films, inspiring other successful franchises such as Ju-On and One Missed Call and spearheading Hollywood's horror films' transition from slashers into more atmospheric films in the 2000s. Despite the success of the original film, Spiral was largely ignored upon release, leading to Nakata and Takahashi making Ring 2 (1999), another sequel ignoring the events of Spiral.

== Plot ==
During a sleepover, high schoolers Tomoko and Masami discuss an urban legend about a videotape that curses its viewers to die in seven days after a foreboding phone call. Tomoko then confesses that a week ago, she and her friends watched a strange videotape and received an inexplicable phone call. After a false alarm phone call, Masami leaves to use the bathroom. Tomoko witnesses the TV turn on by itself and is killed by an unseen figure.

Reiko Asakawa, Tomoko's aunt and a journalist investigating the cursed tape urban legend, attends her funeral and learns that three of Tomoko's friends who watched the tape with her all died at the same time. Reiko finds an unmarked videotape in a resort cabin in Izu where the four stayed. It contains brief, seemingly unrelated scenes accompanied by screeching sounds, and ends with a shot of a well. After watching, Reiko sees an apparition and receives a phone call emitting the screeching sounds from the tape. Convinced she has been cursed, Reiko takes the tape and leaves the cabin.

Reiko enlists the help of her psychic ex-husband Ryūji Takayama. Examining a copy of the tape that Reiko made, the pair find a cryptic message spoken in an Ōshima dialect and prepare to go to Ōshima. Before departing, Reiko catches Yōichi, her son with Ryūji, watching the tape after being pressured by "Tomoko."

In Ōshima, Reiko and Ryūji learn about Shizuko Yamamura, the woman on the tape. Before her suicide, Shizuko gained notoriety following a public demonstration of her psychic ability organized by ESP researcher Dr. Heihachiro Ikuma, with whom she had an affair. When confronting Shizuko's cousin Takashi, they learn through a vision that during the demonstration, Shizuko's young daughter Sadako psychically killed a journalist who decried Shizuko's abilities. After failing to track down Sadako, Reiko realizes that Ryūji never received a phone call after watching the tape, as she did at the cabin in Izu. They rush back to the cabin.

Reiko and Ryūji find a sealed well in the cabin's crawlspace. Through another vision, they learn that Dr. Ikuma trapped Sadako inside the well. They conclude that Sadako remained alive and that the curse was born when a videotape "recorded" the rage she had projected. They drain the water and find Sadako's remains. Reiko's seven-day deadline passes and she remains alive, leading them to believe the curse is broken.

The next day, Ryūji's TV turns on by itself, showing the well at the end of the tape. Sadako's vengeful spirit staggers from the well and out of the TV, advancing toward Ryūji and killing him. Reiko, trying to call Ryūji, hears his last moments over the phone. Guided by an apparition, Reiko realizes she has unwittingly found out how to survive the curse: copy the tape and show it to someone else within seven days. Desperate to save Yōichi, Reiko drives to her father's home to show him the tape.

== Cast ==
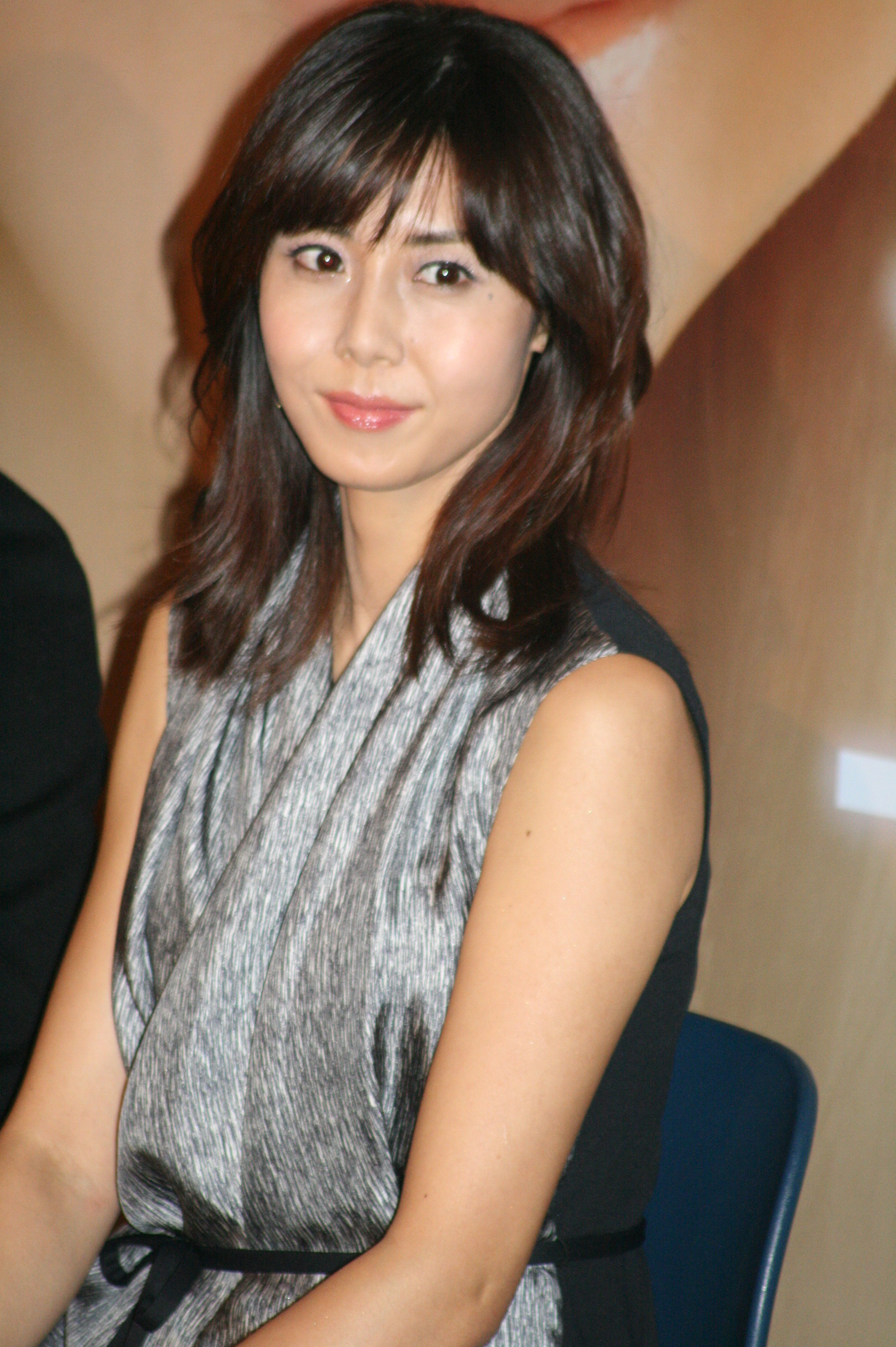
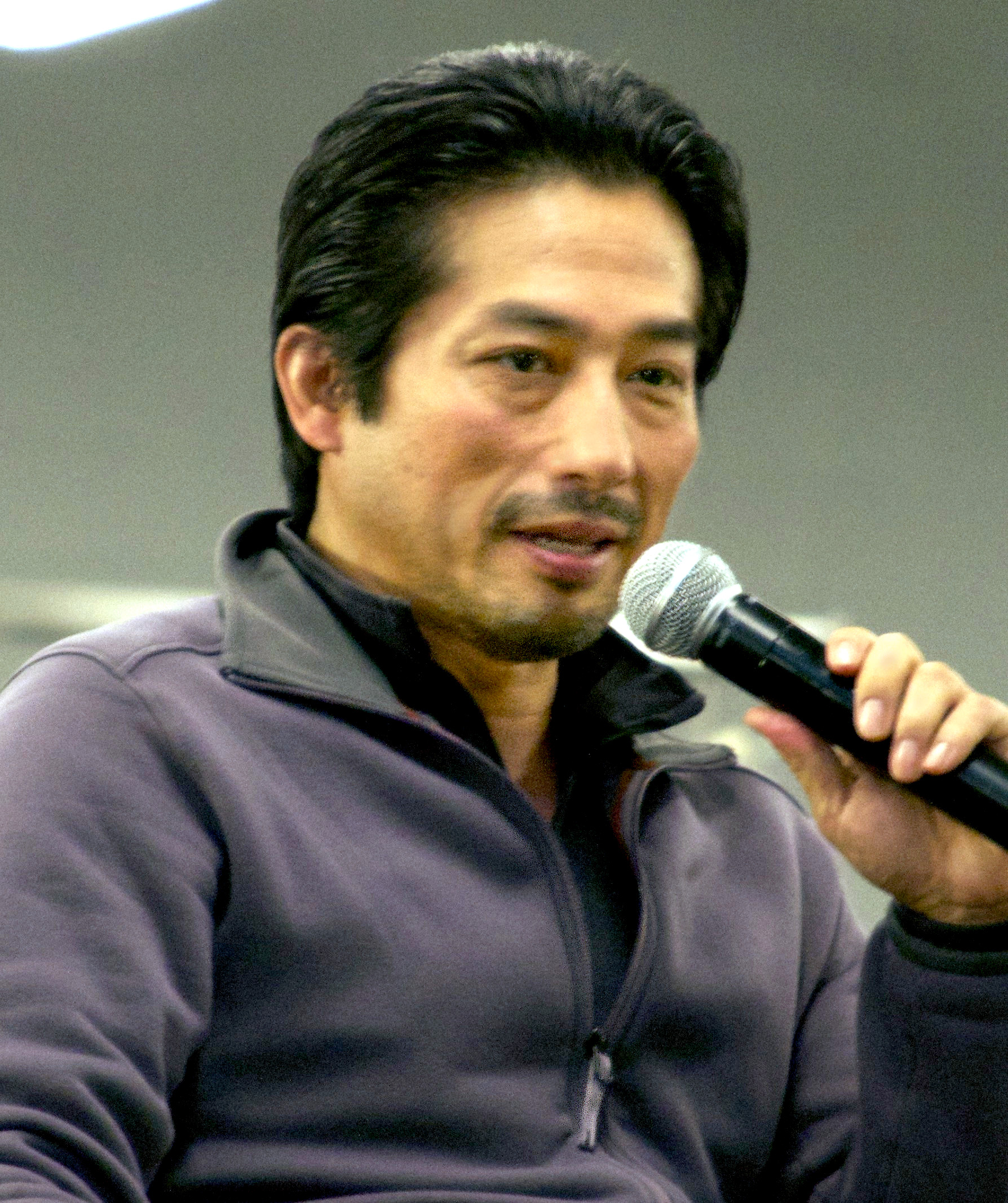
Nanako Matsushima (left) who played the role as the major protagonist, journalist Reiko Asakawa and Hiroyuki Sanada (right) who played the role as Reiko's former husband and university professor, Ryūji Takayama. Ring was Nanako Matsushima and Hiroyuki Sanada's second collaboration, following their first collaboration in the 1997 TV drama Konna Koi no Hanashi.
- Nanako Matsushima as Reiko Asakawa, a journalist who investigates her niece's death and finds the cursed video tape.
- Hiroyuki Sanada as Ryūji Takayama, Reiko's former husband, a former medical student turned university professor. He has a degree of sixth sense that detects supernatural auras.
- Rikiya Otaka as Yōichi Asakawa, Reiko's young son who also has a sixth sense like his father.
- Miki Nakatani as Mai Takano, Ryuji's student.
- Yuko Takeuchi as Tomoko Ōishi, Reiko's niece who watches the cursed video tape and is amongst its first victims.
- Hitomi Sato as Masami Kurahashi, Tomoko's best friend.
- Daisuke Ban as Dr. Heihachiro Ikuma, Sadako's father who threw her down a well.
- Rie Inō as Sadako Yamamura, a young woman with psychic powers who was thrown down a well where she died; her spirit lived on within a video tape.
- Masako as Shizuko Yamamura, Sadako's mother. She too had psychic powers but a disastrous press demonstration led to her suicide.
- Yoichi Numata as Takashi Yamamura, Sadako's uncle who runs an inn on Oshima Island.
- Yutaka Matsushige as Yoshino, a journalist associate of Reiko.
- Katsumi Muramatsu as Kōichi Asakawa, Reiko's father.

== Themes and interpretations ==
Critics have discussed Ring's preoccupations with Japanese tradition's collision with modernity. Colette Balmain identifies: "In the figure of Sadako, Ring [utilises the] vengeful yūrei archetype of conventional Japanese horror". She argues how this traditional Japanese figure is expressed via a video tape which "embodies contemporary anxieties, in that it is technology through which the repressed past reasserts itself".

Ruth Goldberg argues that Ring expresses "ambivalence about motherhood". She reads Reiko as a mother who – due to the new potential for women's independence – neglects her "natural" role as martyred homemaker in pursuit of an independent identity, subsequently neglecting her child. Goldberg identifies a doubling effect whereby the unconscious conflicts of Reiko's family are expressed via the supernatural in the other family under Reiko's investigation.

Jay McRoy reads the ending hopefully: if the characters therapeutically understand their conflicts, they can live on. Balmain, however, is not optimistic; she reads the replication of the video as technology spreading, virus-like, throughout Japan.

=== Title ===
The film's title, Ring, can be interpreted in several ways, such as alluding to the never ending cyclical nature of the ring curse/virus. Another interpretation is that "ring" relates to the phone call which warns those that view the video tape that they will die in seven days, as well as to the view of the ring of light seen from the bottom of the well where Sadako's body was left to decompose.

== Production ==
After the moderate success of the 1991 novel Ring by Koji Suzuki, Kadokawa Shoten decided to adapt it into a motion picture.

Screenwriter Hiroshi Takahashi and director Hideo Nakata collaborated to work on the script after reading Suzuki's novel and watching Fuji Television's 1995 made-for-TV film, directed by Chisui Takigawa. The broadcast version of the 1995 film was re-edited and released on home video under a new title, Ring: Kanzenban (lit. "Ring: The Complete Edition"; Nakata did not state which version of it he and Takahashi watched.

In their film script, Takashi and Nakata changed the protagonist's gender (from male to female), name (from Kazuyuki Asakawa to Reiko Asakawa), marital status (from married to divorced) and child's gender and name (from daughter Yoko to son Yoichi).

Following his work on Ghost Actress (1996), Nakata was approached to direct Ring. According to Nakata, author Koji Suzuki had liked his previous work and specifically asked him to direct the film adaptation. Nakata deliberately adopted a restrained approach to the horror, avoiding direct depictions of the victims' deaths despite questions from the producers over whether this approach would be effective.

Nakata cited The Haunting (1963) as an important influence on the film's approach to horror. He later recalled watching Robert Wise's film at least five times before shooting Ring, particularly admiring its ability to create psychological fear without visibly showing a ghost. Nakata also acknowledged influences from Japanese supernatural traditions, including kabuki theatre and Yotsuya Kaidan.

With the budget of US$1.5 million, the entire production took nine months and one week. According to director Nakata, the script and pre-production process took three or four months, shooting five weeks and post-production four months.

The special effects on the cursed video tape and some parts in the film were shot on a 35 mm film which was passed on to a laboratory in which a computer added a "grainy" effect.

Sound design was also an important part of the production. Nakata worked closely with composer Kenji Kawai and the film's sound-effects team, using numerous individual audio tracks to combine the score with environmental and technological sounds. According to Nakata, four different telephone sounds were mixed together for the film's telephone effects, while approximately 50 tracks each were used for background sound and sound effects.

== Release ==
Ring was released in Japan on January 31, 1998, where it was distributed by Toho. Upon release in Japan, Ring became the highest-grossing horror film in the country. The film was shown at the 1999 Fantasia Film Festival where it won the first place award for Best Feature in the Asian films section.

In the Philippines, the film was given limited releases as Ring: Circle of Evil on both December 4, 2002, and January 11, 2003, to coincide with the North American remake's release on January 17.

=== Box office ===
In Japan, the film earned a distribution income (rentals) of ¥1 billion in 1998, making it one of the top ten highest-grossing Japanese films of the year. The film grossed a total Japanese box office revenue of ¥1.7 billion (US$13 million).

Variety stated that Ring's "most notable success" has been in Hong Kong, where it became the biggest grosser during the first half of the year, beating popular American films such as The Matrix. On its 1999 Hong Kong release, Ring earned HK$31.2 million (US$4.03 million) during its two-month theatrical run making it Hong Kong's highest-grossing Japanese-language film. This record was later beaten by Stand By Me Doraemon in 2015. In Taiwan, where it released in 1999, the film grossed NT$50.83 million (US$1.619 million).

In France, the film sold 94,257 tickets, equivalent to an estimated gross revenue of approximately €506,160 (US$452,737). In South Korea, 56,983 tickets were sold in the capital city of Seoul, equivalent to an estimated gross revenue of approximately ₩341,970,000 ($287,656). The film also grossed $150,893 in Chile, the United Kingdom, Russia, and New Zealand, adding up to an estimated worldwide gross revenue of approximately $19,540,286.

=== Home media ===
Ring was released directly to home video in the United States and Canada by DreamWorks with English, Spanish, and French subtitles on March 4, 2003, under the transliterated title Ringu.

In the United Kingdom, it was watched by 390,000 viewers on television during the first half of 2005, making it the sixth most-watched foreign-language film on UK television during that period. Ring 2 also drew 360,000 viewers on UK television during the same period, adding up to a combined 750,000 UK television viewership for both Ring films during the first half of 2005.

To coincide with its 20th anniversary, Arrow Films under their Arrow Video imprint issued a Blu-ray Disc of Ring on March 18, 2019, in the UK and Ireland. Additionally, a Blu-ray box set featuring Ring, the sequels Spiral and Ring 2, and prequel Ring 0, was also released. The transfer features a 4K resolution restoration that was scanned from the film's original camera negative. The picture grading and restoration, which took place at Imagica Labs in Tokyo, was supervised and approved by Ring cinematographer Jun'ichirō Hayashi. Both Arrow's single Blu-ray Disc and Blu-ray box set were later released in the United States and Canada on October 29, again under the transliterated title Ringu.

== Reception ==
The review aggregator website Rotten Tomatoes gives the film an approval rating of 98% based on 43 reviews, with a weighted average of 7.5 out of 10. The site's critical consensus reads: "Ringu combines supernatural elements with anxieties about modern technology in a truly frightening and unnerving way".

Sight & Sound critic Mark Kermode praised the film's "timeless terror", with its "combination of old folk devils and contemporary moral panics" which appeal to both teen and adult audiences alike. While Adam Smith of Empire Online finds the film "throttled by its over complexity, duff plotting and a distinct lack of actual action", Kermode emphasizes that "one is inclined to conclude that it is the telling, rather than the content of the tale, that is all-important". Variety agrees that the slow pace, with "its gradual evocation of evil lying await beneath the surface of normality", is one of the film's biggest strengths. Ring was listed as the twelfth best horror film of all time by The Guardian and also picked by Stuart Heritage in the same paper as the film that frightened him most.

Upon its British release in 2000, Kevin Jackson of The Independent wrote that the advance hype surrounding the film was largely justified, highlighting the disturbing imagery of the cursed videotape. Ekow Eshun, writing for the same newspaper, praised the film's creation of a plausible and unsettling urban legend, arguing that this quality helped explain its considerable popularity.

Ring was ranked No. 69 in Empire magazine's "The 100 Best Films of World Cinema" in 2010. In the early 2010s, Time Out conducted a poll with several authors, directors, actors and critics who have worked within the horror genre to vote for their top horror films. Ring placed at number 61 on their top 100 list.

== Influence ==
The international success of the Japanese films launched a revival of horror film making in Japan that resulted in such pictures as Kiyoshi Kurosawa's 2001 film Pulse (known as Kairo (回路; lit. "Circuit") in Japan), Takashi Shimizu's The Grudge (呪怨, Juon) (2000), Hideo Nakata's Dark Water (仄暗い水の底から, Honogurai Mizu no Soko kara; lit. "From the Depths of Dark Water"), also based on a short story by Suzuki), and Higuchinsky's Uzumaki (2000, a.k.a. Vortex, based on the Junji Ito horror manga of the same name).

=== Influence on Western cinema ===
Ring had some influence on Western cinema and gained cult status in the West.

Throughout the 1980s and 1990s, Hollywood horror had largely been dominated by the slasher sub-genre, which relied on on-screen violence, shock tactics, and gore. Ring, whose release in Japan roughly coincided with The Blair Witch Project in the United States, helped to revitalize the genre by taking a more restrained approach to horror, leaving much of the terror to the audience's imagination. The film initiated global interest in Japanese cinema in general and Japanese horror cinema in particular, a renaissance which led to the coining of the term J-Horror in the West. This "New Asian Horror" resulted in further successful releases, such as Ju-on: The Grudge and Dark Water. In addition to Japanese productions this boom also managed to bring attention to similar films made in East Asia at the same time such as A Tale of Two Sisters from South Korea and The Eye from Hong Kong.

All of these films were later remade in English. Released in 2002, The Ring reached number 1 at the box office and grossed slightly more in Japan than the original. The original Ring grossed ¥1.7 billion in 1998, while The Ring remake grossed ¥1.75 billion in 2002.

== Sequels and remakes ==
The original sequel was Spiral, released in 1998, but due to its poor reception, a new sequel, Ring 2, was released in 1999 which continued the story line of this film. It was followed by a 2000 prequel, Ring 0: Birthday, followed by Sadako in 2019. Spiral in turn was followed by Sadako 3D in 2012 and Sadako 3D 2 in 2013. Another installment, Sadako DX, was released in 2022.

A television series, Ring: The Final Chapter, was made, with a similar storyline but many changes in characters and their backstories. A South Korean remake The Ring Virus was made in 1999, as well as an American remake, The Ring, in 2002.

== See also ==
- Chain letter
- List of cult films
- List of ghost films
- Don't Look Up (1996 film)
- Ju-On
- Yotsuya Kaidan
