= Spiral (Suzuki novel) =

1995 horror novel by Koji Suzuki

- Author: Koji Suzuki
- Original title: Spiral (らせん, Rasen)
- Translator: Glynne Walley
- Cover artist: Chip Kidd
- Language: Japanese
- Series: Ring
- Genre: Horror
- Publisher: Kadokawa Shoten, Vertical, Inc.
- Publication date: 1995
- Publication place: Japan
- English publication date: 2004
- Media type: Paperback
- Preceded by: Ring
- Followed by: Loop

Spiral (らせん, Rasen) is a 1995 Japanese novel, a part of author Koji Suzuki's Ring series. It is the second in the Ring series, and a film based on the book was released in 1998. The English translation of the book was published by Vertical Press in the United States and by HarperCollins in Britain.

Two direct film adaptations of the novel have been produced: the 1998 Japanese film Spiral, and the 2017 American film Rings, as well as a 1999 Japanese television series Rasen.

== Plot ==
Ando Mitsuo, a coroner still struggling with his son's death, is assigned to do the autopsy of his old classmate Ryūji Takayama. He and his colleague, Miyashita, find a tumor in Ryūji's heart, believed to be the cause of his death. Puzzled as the tumor appears similar to smallpox (which was eradicated in 1979), Ando completes the autopsy and, upon finding a newspaper poking through a suture, is reminded of Ryūji's cryptography hobby. Finding the newspaper numbers interesting, he decodes them and discovers they spell "RING", which perplexes Ando.

While searching for the message's meaning, Ando meets Mai Takano, Ryūji's assistant and friend. Mai mentions a videotape that Ryūji watched before dying and believes that it is connected to his death. Learning of Kazuyuki Asakawa, Ryūji's friend, Ando considers speaking to him, only to learn that Asakawa and his family were involved in a car accident, leaving Kazuyuki Asakawa the sole survivor and catatonic. Ando realizes that the wife and child were dead well before the car crashed, and that a tape recorder and word processor were in the vehicle.

After losing contact with Mai, Ando goes to her seemingly abandoned condominium. He finds what he believes to be a copy of the supposedly cursed videotape, albeit almost entirely overwritten, and thinks an unknown entity is hiding somewhere in the condo. Learning that Asakawa's tape deck and word processor went to his next of kin, Ando retrieves the word processor from his brother and copies the files.

Finding a document about the videotape, Ando reads that the curse spreads through a tape and can only be stopped by copying and sharing it with someone else. Despite dismissing the documents as pseudoscientific, Ando and Miyashita continue reading and discover that the Ring Virus started with the murder of psychic Sadako Yamamura. Additionally, Miyashita soon learns that a virus connects all of the victims and comes in two forms: a ring-shaped virus that kills the host, and a broken version of the same virus (similar to a sperm cell), which is dormant.

One week after Mai's disappearance, her corpse is found in the ventilation shaft of a barely used office building. Additionally, despite having given no physical indication that she was pregnant, Mai's corpse shows signs that she gave birth before her death. Upon visiting the crime scene, Ando meets a beautiful woman named Masako, who introduces herself as Mai's older sister. After having sex with Masako, Ando later receives a fax containing information on Sadako from Miyashita, only to realize that Masako is identical to Sadako.

Believing that Masako is Sadako reborn, Ando receives a note from her explaining that Mai was infected with the 2nd "sperm" ring virus, which targeted her womb. This allowed Sadako to conceive herself within Mai and control her, before birthing herself within a week and disposing of Mai's corpse. Also revealing that the Ring Virus can spread through literary descriptions, Sadako has ensured that Asakawa's brother publishes a book on Kazuyuki's files, allowing the virus to spread internationally. She then concludes that Ando is infected with the dormant virus and, should he interfere in any way, she will activate it and kill him; conversely, in exchange for Ando's cooperation, Sadako will resurrect Ando's dead son.

Finally learning that Ryūji worked with Sadako to ensure her resurrection, Ando realizes that Ryūji deliberately influenced himself and Mai. By supernaturally causing the paper code to appear to Ando and making Mai watch the tape when she was most fertile, Ryūji was the mastermind behind the plan, doing so to be spared and revived by Sadako. An epilogue shows Ando playing with his son, Takanori, at which point Ryūji arrives and implies that he acted for the greater good.

== Adaptations ==
A film of the same title was released in 1998 which was based on the book. It was poorly received and later another sequel to the 1998 Ring film was made, Ring 2. A 13-episode TV drama was broadcast in 1999 on Fuji Television. Elements of Spiral were adapted in the 2017 American film Rings.

Films

- Spiral (1998)

TV series

- Rasen (1999)

Manga

- Rasen (1999)

== See also ==
- Ring
- Koji Suzuki
- Japanese horror
