= The Ring (franchise) =

Horror film franchise

Ring
- Created by: Koji Suzuki
- Original work: Ring (1991)
- Owners: Kadokawa Corporation (most media); Paramount Pictures (American films)
- Years: 1991-present

Print publications
- Novel(s): Ring (1991); Spiral (1995); Loop (1998); Birthday (1999); S (2012); Tide (2013)
- Comics: Ring (1996); Ring – Volume 1 (1999); Ring – Volume 2 (1999); Ring 2 (1999); Spiral (1999); Birthday (1999); Ring 0: Birthday (2000); Sadako-san and Sadako-chan (2019); Sadako at the End of the World (2020)

Films and television
- Film(s): Ring (1995); Ring (1998); Spiral (1998); Ring 2 (1999); The Ring Virus (1999); Ring 0: Birthday (2000); The Ring (2002); The Ring Two (2005); Sadako 3D (2012); Sadako 3D 2 (2013); Sadako vs. Kayako (2016); Rings (2017); Sadako (2019); Sadako DX (2022)
- Short film(s): Rings (2005)
- Television series: Ring: The Final Chapter (1999); Spiral (1999)

Games
- Video game(s): The Ring: Terror's Realm (2000); Ring: Infinity (2000)

Audio
- Radio program(s): Ring (1996); Birthday (2000); Ring (2015)
- Soundtrack(s): Ring/Spiral (1998); Ring 2 (1999); Ring: The Final Chapter (1999); The Ring Virus (1999); Spiral (1999); Ring 0: Birthday (2000); The Ring/The Ring Two (2005); Rings (2017)

Ring (Japanese: リング, romanized: Ringu), also known as The Ring, is a horror media franchise, based on the novel series of the same name written by Koji Suzuki. The franchise includes nine Japanese films, two television series, eight manga adaptations, three English-language American film remakes, a Korean film remake, and two video games: The Ring: Terror's Realm and Ring: Infinity (both 2000). While most installments of the franchise are dramatic supernatural horror fiction, other genres are also explored, with the novel Loop (1998) being science fiction–focused, and the manga series Sadako-san and Sadako-chan (2019) and Sadako at the End of the World (2020) and feature film Sadako DX (2022) being comedy-focused.

The Japanese Ring films revolve around a cursed video tape; whoever watches the tape dies seven days later, unless the tape is copied and shown to another person, who then must repeat the same process. The video tape was created by a psychic, Sadako Yamamura, who was murdered by her adoptive father and thrown into a well. After her death, she returned as a ghostly malicious serial killer, killing anyone who fails to copy and then send the video tape to someone else under a seven-day deadline (constricted to a two-day deadline in Sadako vs. Kayako and a one-day deadline in Sadako DX).

== Japanese media ==
=== Novels ===
The franchise began with Koji Suzuki's 1991 novel Ring. It was the first of a trilogy, with two sequels: Spiral (1995) and Loop (1998). Several later novels based on Ring were released: Birthday (1999); which contains a prequel to Ring, an epilogue to Loop, and details about what happened to a key character in Spiral, S (2012), and Tide (2013).

=== Films ===
Ring story chronology
Spiral Continuity
- Ring (1998)
- Spiral (1998)
- Sadako 3D (2012)
- Sadako 3D 2 (2013)
Nakata Continuity
- Ring 0: Birthday (2000)
- Ring (1998)
- Ring 2 (1999)
- Sadako (2019)
DX Continuity
- Ring (1998)
- Sadako DX (2022)

In 1998, Hideo Nakata made a new Japanese adaptation of the book in his film Ring (also known as The Ring or its transliteration Ringu). The film was a critical and commercial success, being credited with revolutionizing the J-horror genre and influencing many future films in the wider horror genre.

The first sequel to the 1998 film was Spiral (also known as The Spiral or, in the original Japanese, Rasen). It was an adaptation of Spiral, Suzuki's sequel to his first Ring book. It was released on 31 January 1998, the same day as Ring. It was not received well by critics or audiences. It was directed by George Iida, who had previously worked as the writer for the television film, Ring (1995).

A replacement sequel, Ring 2, was released in 1999. The film continues the storyline of Ring (1998) and ignores the events of Spiral (1998) and many cast members from the original film return. Hideo Nakata also returned to direct. This was the first film in the franchise not based on any of Suzuki's novels. While not as critically well-received as the first film, it was a financial success, becoming the second-highest grossing Japanese film of 1999.

A prequel, Ring 0: Birthday, was released in 2000. The movie is based on the short story "Lemon Heart" from Suzuki's 1999 book, Birthday (the fourth book in the series). This film delved into a uniquely different mythos surrounding Sadako Yamamura and the cursed videotape than the novels, elaborated on from aspects introduced in the Nakata films.

In 2012, Sadako 3D was released, adapted from Suzuki's book S that released the same year. A direct sequel, Sadako 3D 2 was released in 2013. Both were directed by Tsutomu Hanabusa. They are sequels to Spiral, ignoring the film Ring 2 and thereby creating a branched-off continuity.

In 2016, Sadako vs. Kayako, directed by Kōji Shiraishi, was released, a crossover of the Ju-on series of horror films. It features Sadakaya, a ghost that resulted from the fusion of Sadako and the Ju-on antagonist Kayako Saeki. It is a standalone film and is not canon to either timeline or franchise and the deadline for the video tape is two days instead of seven.

Sadako aka Sadako KOL was released in 2019. It saw the return of director Hideo Nakata to the Japanese film series for the first time since Ring 2, 20 years prior. It is a sequel to Ring 2 following its own continuity separate from Spiral. The film is loosely based on Tide, the final novel in the series. KOL is an acronym for Key Opinion Leader; in this context, a social media star.

Sadako DX, directed by Hisashi Kimura, was released in 2022. The film stars Fuka Koshiba as a college student attempting to unravel the curse of Sadako with the help of a psychic and a fortune teller. It is a sequel to the original Ring, ignoring the events of the Spiral and Ring 2 timelines respectively.

=== Television ===
The first adaptation of Ring was the Japanese television film Ring (with one uncensored home video release titled Ring: Kanzenban, meaning 'Ring: The Complete Edition'), released in 1995. This remained the closest to the book but didn't have the success and recognition of the later films.

Ring: The Final Chapter is a 12 episode self-contained miniseries that aired in 1999, and is loosely based on the original Ring novel. It is not connected to the films or the previous television adaptation.

In the same year, a sequel television miniseries simply titled Spiral was made, consisting of 13 episodes.

=== Manga ===
A manga adaptation of the first novel was released in 1996 by Kouhirou Nagai, and several manga have been published by Kadokawa Shoten based on the films. The second manga adaptation is a two-volume series based on the first novel, the first Hideo Nakata film, and the 1999 television series. That manga was written and illustrated by Misao Inagaki. Both volumes were released on January 21, 1999. Dark Horse Comics compiled the first two volumes and released an English-language version on November 12, 2003.

The third adaptation, of Nakata's Ring 2 film, was written and by illustrated by Meimu, was released on February 3, 1999. Dark Horse Comics released it on May 19, 2004 as the second volume of The Ring manga series.

The fourth adaptation, titled Spiral (らせん, Rasen), is based on the novel and film of the same name. The manga was written and illustrated by Sakura Mizuki, and released on September 10, 1999. Dark Horse released it on August 18, 2004 as volume 3 of The Ring manga series.

The fifth adaptation, titled Birthday (バースデイ, Bāsudei), is based on the novel of the same name. The manga was written and illustrated by Meimu and released on December 22, 1999. Dark Horse Comics released it on November 3, 2004 as volume 4 of The Ring manga series.

The sixth, titled Ring 0, based on the film of that name, was also written and illustrated by Meimu, and released on January 28, 2000. Dark Horse Comics released it on March 30, 2005 as "Volume 0" of The Ring manga series.

There was also the manga prequel to this adaptation, titled The Curse of Yamamura Sadako (The Curse of Sadako Yamamura), included in the Ring 0 promotional image book "The Sadako", that explains how Sadako split into the good and evil halves before Ring 0.

The seventh, titled Sadako-San To Sadako-Chan (Sadako-San and Sadako-Chan), was published in February 2019, before the release of Sadako, as a comedy-oriented tie-in sequel to the film.

The eighth, titled Sadako at The End of the World, was released in 2020, following Sadako as she is summoned by the last two girls living on a post-apocalyptic Earth, indicating her curse to be nearing its end.

== Korean remake ==
The Ring Virus was the first remake to be made, in 1999, where the villain is renamed as Park Eun-suh, who is intersex, as Sadako was in the books. Though the film copied multiple scenes from the 1998 theatrical Ring film, it is, like the 1995 Ring TV movie, more faithful to the original novel series.

== American films ==
In 2002, an English-language remake was made, titled The Ring, where the killer is renamed as Samara Morgan, who is a preteen instead of an adult. The Ring was one of the highest-grossing horror remakes, its box office gross surpassing that of Ring. Two feature-length sequels were made, as well as a short film.

The Ring story chronology
The Ring continuity
- The Ring (2002)
- Rings (2005; short)
- The Ring Two (2005)
Alternate continuity
- The Ring (2002)
- Rings (2017)

The Ring was released on October 18, 2002. The film follows journalist Rachel Keller as she investigates a videotape that may have killed four teenagers (including her niece). There is an urban legend about this tape: the viewer will die seven days after watching it. If the legend is correct, Rachel would have to run against time to save her son's and her own.

A short film, Rings, was released on March 8, 2005, originally as part of the DVD set of the first film. Jake Pierce, a young teenager, watches a cursed video tape after joining a teen cult named "Rings".

The Ring Two was released on March 18, 2005. High school student Jake Pierce tries to make his girlfriend Emily watch the cursed videotape. After discovering that Emily covered her eyes and didn't watch the tape, he is killed by Samara Morgan. Rachel Keller learns of Jake's death and realizes she has to save her son Aidan from Samara.

Rings was released on February 3, 2017. The story follows Julia who becomes worried about her boyfriend when he explores a dark subculture surrounding a mysterious videotape said to kill the watcher seven days after they view the tape. Her actions lead her to make a horrifying discovery: there is a "movie within the movie" that no one has ever seen before. This film is a direct sequel to the 2002 film and ignores the events of both the short film Rings (2005) and The Ring Two.

=== Future ===
In September 2019, The Grudge (2019) director Nicolas Pesce expressed interest in a crossover film between The Grudge and the English-language The Ring film series.

== Japanese cast and crew ==
=== Cast ===
Key
- A ^{Y} indicates the actor portrayed the role of a younger version of the character.
- A ^{P} indicates the actor or actress portrayed their film character as possessed by another.
- An ^{A} indicates an appearance through archival footage.
- A ^{C} indicates a cameo appearance.
- A dark gray cell indicates the character was not in the film.

Character	Ring	Spiral	Ring 2	Ring 0: Birthday	Sadako 3D	Sadako 3D 2	Sadako	Sadako DX
Character	1998		1999	2000	2012	2013	2019	2022
Sadako Yamamura mysterious girl	Rie Inō	Hinako Saeki Miki Nakatani^{P}	Rie Inō Mebuki Tsuchida^{Y}	Yukie Nakama	Ai Hashimoto	Satomi Ishihara^{P}	Himeka Himejima	Computer-generated imagery
Shizuko Yamamura	Masako	Masako^{A}	Masako	Masako				
Mai Takano	Miki Nakatani	Miki Nakatani	Miki Nakatani					
Dr. Heihachiro Ikuma	Daisuke Ban	Daisuke Ban	Mentioned	Daisuke Ban				
Takashi Yamamura	Yoichi Numata		Yoichi Numata	Mahito Ohba^{Y}				
Reiko Asakawa	Nanako Matsushima	Nanako Matsushima^{A}	Nanako Matsushima					
Ryuji Takayama	Hiroyuki Sanada	Hiroyuki Sanada	Hiroyuki Sanada					
Masami Kurahashi	Hitomi Satō		Hitomi Satō				Hitomi Satō	
Yoichi Asakawa	Rikiya Otaka	Mentioned	Rikiya Otaka					
Okazaki	Yūrei Yanagi		Yūrei Yanagi					
Tomoko Ōishi	Yūko Takeuchi							
Yoshino	Yutaka Matsushige	Yutaka Matsushige						
Kōichi Asakawa	Katsumi Muramatsu	Mentioned	Mentioned					
Takanori Ando		Ryûichi Sugahara^{Y}			Koji Seto	Koji Seto		
Mitsuo Ando		Koichi Sato						
Miyashita		Shingo Tsurumi						
Shashin Gakari		Kozo Sato						
Maekawa Keibuho		Shigemitsu Ogi						
Kobayashi		Naoaki Manabe						
Smiling father		Kôji Suzuki^{C}						
Kanae Sawaguchi			Kyoko Fukada					
Ishi Kawajiri			Fumiyo Kohinata					
Detective Keiji Omuta			Kenjirō Ishimaru					
Akiko Miyaji				Yoshiko Tanaka				
Hiroshi Toyama				Seiichi Tanabe				
Etsuko Tachihara				Kumiko Asō				
Kaoru Arima				Atsuko Takahata				
Yusaku Shigemori				Takeshi Wakamatsu				
Wataru Kuno				Ryushi Mizukami				
Aiko Hazuki				Kaoru Okunuki				
Akane Ayukawa					Satomi Ishihara Yuna Taira^{Y}	Satomi Ishihara		
Seiji Kashiwada					Yusuke Yamamoto	Yusuke Yamamoto		
Detective Yugo Koiso					Ryosei Tayama	Ryosei Tayama		
Enoki					Shota Sometani			
Fuko Ando						Miori Takimoto		
Fumika Kamimura						Itsumi Osawa		
Nagi Ando						Kokoro Hirasawa		
Mitsugi Kakiuchi						Takeshi Onishi		
Seiji Kashiwada						Yusuke Yamamoto		
Mayu Akikawa							Elaiza Ikeda	
Yusuke Ishida							Takashi Tsukamoto	
Hatsuko Sobue							Rie Tomosaka	
Ayaka Ichijō								Fuka Koshiba
Oji Maeda								Kazuma Kawamura
Kenshin								Hiroyuki Ikeuchi

=== Crew ===
Crew/Detail	Ring	Spiral	Ring 2	Ring 0: Birthday	Sadako 3D	Sadako 3D 2	Sadako	Sadako DX
Crew/Detail	1998		1999	2000	2012	2013	2019	2022
Director	Hideo Nakata	George Iida	Hideo Nakata	Norio Tsuruta	Tsutomu Hanabusa	Tsutomu Hanabusa	Hideo Nakata	Hisashi Kimura
Producer(s)	Shinya Kawai Taka Ichise Takenori Sento	Takashige Ichise Shinya Kawai Takenori Sento	Takashige Ichise Shin Ishihara	Shinji Ogawa Masao Nagai Takasige Ichise	Atsuyuki Shimoda	Reiko Imayasu		
Writer(s)	Screenplay by Hiroshi Takahashi; Based on Ring by Koji Suzuki	Screenplay by George Iida; Based on Spiral by Koji Suzuki	Screenplay by Hiroshi Takahashi; Based on characters created by Koji Suzuki	Screenplay by Hiroshi Takahashi; Based on Lemon Heart from Birthday by Koji Suzuki	Screenplay by Koji Suzuku Tsutomu Takahashi; Based on S by Koji Suzuki	Screenplay by Daisuke Hosaka Noriaki Sugihara Based on S by Koji Suzuki	Screenplay by Noriaki Sugihara Based on Tide by Koji Suzuki	Screenplay by Yuya Takahashi
Composer	Kenji Kawai	La Finca	Kenji Kawai	Shinichiro Ogata	Kenji Kawai	Kenji Kawai		
Cinematographer	Junichiro Hayashi	Makoto Watanabe	Hideo Yamamoto	Takahide Shibanushi	Nobushige Fujimoto	Nobushige Fujimoto		
Editor(s)	Nobuyuki Takahashi	Hirohibe Abe	Nobuyuki Takahashi	Hiroshi Sunaga				
Production companies	Ring/Spiral Production Committee	Ring/Spiral Production Committee	Asmik Ace Entertainment	Ring 0 Production Group Production	Kadokawa Shoten	Tohokushinsha Film	Kadokawa	
Distributor	Toho	Toho	Toho	Toho	Kadokawa Shoten	Kadokawa Shoten	Kadokawa	
Release date	January 31, 1998		January 23, 1999	January 22, 2000	May 12, 2012	August 30, 2013	March 24, 2019	October 28, 2022
Running time	95 minutes	98 minutes	95 minutes	99 minutes	96 minutes	96 minutes	99 minutes	100 minutes

== American cast and crew ==
=== Cast ===
Key
- A ^{Y} indicates the actor portrayed the role of a younger version of the character.
- A ^{V} indicates the actor or actress lent only his or her voice for his or her film character.
- A ^{P} indicates the actor or actress portrayed their film character as possessed by another.
- An ^{A} indicates an appearance through archival footage.
- A ^{C} indicates a cameo appearance.
- A ^{E} indicates an appearance not included in the theatrical cut.
- A ^{U} indicates an uncredited appearance.
- A dark gray cell indicates the character was not in the film.

Characters	Films				Short film
Characters	The Ring	The Ring Two		Rings	Rings
Characters	2002	2005		2017	2005
Samara Morgan	Daveigh Chase	Daveigh Chase^{A}	Daveigh Chase^{A}	Daveigh Chase^{U}^{A}	Kelly Stables
Samara Morgan	Daveigh Chase	David Dorfman^{P}	Bonnie Morgan	Bonnie Morgan	Kelly Stables
Samara Morgan	Kelly Stables	David Dorfman^{P}	Kelly Stables	Zoe Pessin^{V} Matilda Lutz^{P}	Kelly Stables
Samara Morgan	Kelly Stables	Caitlin Mavromates^{Y}	Caitlin Mavromates^{Y}	Zoe Pessin^{V} Matilda Lutz^{P}	Kelly Stables
Anna Morgan	Shannon Cochran	Shannon Cochran^{A}	Shannon Cochran^{A}	Shannon Cochran^{A}	Shannon Cochran^{A}
Rachel Keller	Naomi Watts	Naomi Watts	Naomi Watts		Mentioned
Aidan Keller	David Dorfman	David Dorfman	David Dorfman		
Noah Clay	Martin Henderson				
Richard Morgan	Brian Cox				
Ruth Embry	Lindsay Frost				
Katherine "Katie" Embry	Amber Tamblyn				
Rebecca "Becca" Kotler	Rachael Bella				
Evelyn Borden (née Osorio)		Sissy Spacek Mary Elizabeth Winstead^{Y} ^{E}	Sissy Spacek Mary Elizabeth Winstead^{Y} ^{E}	Kayli Carter	
Jake Pierce		Ryan Merriman	Ryan Merriman		Ryan Merriman
Emily		Emily VanCamp	Emily VanCamp		Emily VanCamp
Eddie		Justin Allen^{VC}	Justin Allen^{VC}		Justin Allen
Max Rourke		Simon Baker	Simon Baker		
Dr. Emma Temple		Elizabeth Perkins	Elizabeth Perkins		
Galen Burke				Vincent D'Onofrio	
Julia				Matilda Lutz	
Holt Anthony				Alex Roe	
Gabriel Brown				Johnny Galecki	
Skye Johnston				Aimee Teegarden	
Carter				Zach Roerig	
Faith				Laura Slade Wiggins	
Kelly				Lizzie Brocheré	
Vanessa					Alexandra Breckenridge
Timothy "Tim" Rivers					Josh Wise

=== Crew ===
Crew/Detail	Films			Short film
Crew/Detail	The Ring	The Ring Two	Rings	Rings
Crew/Detail	2002	2005	2017	2005
Director	Gore Verbinski	Hideo Nakata	F. Javier Gutiérrez	Jonathan Liebesman
Producer(s)	Walter F. Parkes; Laurie MacDonald	Walter F. Parkes; Laurie MacDonald	Walter F. Parkes; Laurie MacDonald	Jeanette Volturno; Arnon Manor
Writer(s)	Screenplay by Ehren Kruger; Based on Ring by Koji Suzuki	Ehren Kruger	Screenplay by David Loucka; Jacob Estes; Akiva Goldsman; Story by David Loucka; Jacob Estes; Based on Spiral by Koji Suzuki	Ehren Kruger; Jonathan Liebesman
Composer	Hans Zimmer	Henning Lohner Martin Tillman	Matthew Margeson	—N/a
Director of photography	Bojan Bazelli	Gabriel Beristain	Sharone Meir	Lukas Ettlin
Editor(s)	Craig Wood	Michael N. Knue	Jeremiah O'Driscoll; Steve Mirkovich	Sheila Moreland
Production companies	BenderSpink Parkes/MacDonald Productions	BenderSpink Parkes/MacDonald Productions	Parkes/MacDonald + Imagenatation	CatchLight Films
Distributor	DreamWorks Pictures	DreamWorks Pictures	Paramount Pictures	DreamWorks Home Entertainment
Release date	October 18, 2002	March 18, 2005	February 3, 2017	March 8, 2005
Running time	115 minutes	110 minutes	102 minutes	17 minutes

== Other media ==
The novel as adapted by the Japanese radio station TBS as a radio drama in 1996 with significant changes such as Kazuyuki Asakawa becoming a radio DJ named Toru Asakawa, Ryuji becoming his female love interest Ryouko, Tomoko (one of the first four victims) becoming the only victim, Toru's radio colleague Tomokazu, Sadako's well being under the radio station, and Sadako wanting to use the Internet to spread himself and offering Toru to bring back into life his deceased daughter if he helps her, thus combining elements of Spiral into the story. This adaptation later got two different CD releases.

The novel was also adapted by the BBC into an hour-long radio drama as part of their Fright Night series, and starred Naoko Mori as Sadako. In this rendition, the counterpart of Kazayuki is instead named Mitchell Hooper and is portrayed as a British expatriate residing in Japan as a journalist rather than a Japanese citizen by birth and, consequently, his wife is renamed to Toni. Otherwise, the plot of the radio drama is fairly close to the original novel.

== Reception ==
The original 1991 novel Ring sold 500,000 copies by January 1998, and 1.5 million copies by July 2000.

=== Box office performance ===
Japanese films
Film	Year	Box office gross			Budget
Film	Year	Japan	South Korea	Other regions	Budget
Ring	1998	¥1,700,000,000	₩341,970,000	$6,261,738 (Note: Ring (1998) overseas box office: Chile and United Kingdom – $59,001; France – €506,160 ($452,737); Hong Kong – HK$31.2 million (US$4.03 million); Taiwan – NT$50.83 million (US$1.72 million))	$1.5 million
Spiral	1998	¥1,700,000,000	₩25,482,000	—N/a	?
Ring 2	1999	¥3,570,000,000	₩771,180,000	$117,493	?
Ring 0: Birthday	2000	¥1,600,000,000	₩40,642,000	—N/a	?
Sadako 3D	2012	¥1,350,000,000	₩1,128,635,032	$3,486,438 (Note: Sadako 3D (2012) overseas box office: Hong Kong, Malaysia, Singapore, Taiwan – US$2,263,295; Russia, Thailand – $1,223,143)	?
Sadako 3D 2	2013	¥688,494,993	₩92,668,200	$1,375,682	?
Sadako vs. Kayako	2016	¥1,000,000,000	₩202,716,000	$704,922	?
Sadako	2019	¥164,000,000	—N/a	—N/a	?
Regional total		¥11,772,494,993 ($142,079,440)	₩2,603,293,232 ($2,367,292)	$11,946,273	$1.5 million+
Worldwide total		$156,495,481			$1.5 million+

American films
Film	Release date	Box office gross			Budget	Ref.
Film	Release date	North America	Other territories	Worldwide	Budget	Ref.
The Ring	October 18, 2002	$129,128,133	$120,220,800	$249,348,933	$48 million	
The Ring Two	March 18, 2005	$76,231,249	$87,764,700	$163,995,949	$50 million	
Rings	February 3, 2017	$27,793,018	$55,287,872	$83,080,890	$25 million	
Total		$233,152,400	$263,273,372	$496,425,772	$123 million	

South Korean film
Film	Release date	Box office gross (South Korea)	Budget
The Ring Virus	June 12, 1999	₩1,994,124,000 ($1,689,326)	?

Total
Japanese films	American films	South Korean film	Box office total
$156,495,481	$496,425,772	$1,689,326	$654,610,579

=== Critical and audience response ===
Film	Rotten Tomatoes	Metacritic	CinemaScore
Ring	98% (43 reviews)	—N/a	—N/a
Ring 2	0% (13 reviews)	—N/a	—N/a
The Ring	72% (214 reviews)	57 (36 reviews)	B−
The Ring Two	21% (186 reviews)	44 (37 reviews)	C+
Sadako vs. Kayako	50% (22 reviews)	—N/a	—N/a
Rings	8% (115 reviews)	25 (23 reviews)	C−
Sadako	23% (26 reviews)	—N/a	—N/a

== Unofficial films ==
In 2015, Hikiko-san vs Sadako (or simply Hikiko vs Sadako), directed by Nagaoka Hisaaki was released. While the DVD cover features a character resembling Sadako emerging from a well, the character in the film is named Sadako Takamura.

In 2016 and 2017, Bunshinsaba vs. Sadako and Bunshinsaba vs Sadako 2, both directed by River Huang, a crossover with the Bunshinsaba film series, were released. In 2021, the third film in the series, formerly known as Bunshinsaba vs Sadako 3, was renamed Bunshinsaba: Hoichi the Earless (because of the addition of Kuman thong to the Chinese Bunshinsaba series' star Bixian the Pen Fairy and Sakado). It, too, was directed by River Huang.

The Return of Sadako, (Note: 贞子归来) released in 2018, was the first stand-alone Chinese Ring film to be made following the crossover film Bunshinaba vs. Sadako in 2016; produced by Scarecrow Pictures, the film's killers are renamed as sisters Sadako and Kawako, who flee to China alongside their father after the outbreak of the Second Sino-Japanese War, before turning against one another for the love of a Japanese boy; years later a projector is discovered in their house with their souls imprinted upon it. Though the film was marketed as an unofficial sequel to Sadako 3D 2, it is in-fact a remake.

Sadako: Pendant of Mourning was released on DVD on September 13, 2024, it was originally supposed to be released on Amazon Prime Video.
