= Ring 4 =

Ring 4 may refer to:

== Places ==
- Ring 4 (ring of Uranus)
- Ring 4 Route, a super bikeways in metropolitan Copenhagen, Denmark
- Ring 4 (Danish: Motorring 4), one of the motorways in Denmark

== Other uses ==
- Ring 4 (computer security), see protection ring
- Ring IV, a planned road in Helsinki region, Finland

== See also ==
- The Ring Volume 0: Birthday, the fourth release volume in the Ring literary J-horror series
- S (Suzuki novel), the fourth novel in the Ring literary J-horror series
- Sadako 3D 1, the fourth film in the Ring cinematic J-horror series
- Sadako 3D 2, the in-universe chronological fourth sequel to Ring in the cinematic J-horror series
- Fourth planned The Ring film in the U.S. film series of The Ring (franchise)
- Fourth Ring Society, at the New York City Ballet
- Fourth Ring Road (disambiguation)
- Ring (disambiguation)
