= Sadako (film) =

2019 Japanese supernatural horror film

- Theatrical release poster
- 貞子
- Directed by: Hideo Nakata
- Screenplay by: Noriaki Sugihara
- Based on: Tide by Koji Suzuki
- Starring: Elaiza Ikeda; Hiroya Shimizu
- Production company: Kadokawa Daiei Studio
- Distributed by: Kadokawa
- Release date: 24 May 2019
- Running time: 99 minutes
- Country: Japan
- Language: Japanese
- Box office: $5.6 million

Sadako (Japanese: 貞子), also known as Sadako KOL (Japanese: 貞子：咒殺 KOL), is a 2019 Japanese supernatural horror film directed by Hideo Nakata. Loosely based on the novel Tide by Koji Suzuki, the film is an installment in the Ring franchise, and a direct sequel to Nakata's 1999 film Ring 2, in a separate continuity from the prior films Sadako 3D (2012) and Sadako 3D 2 (2013). The film centers around a vengeful ghost named Sadako Yamamura who is associated with a cursed video tape; whoever watches the tape is killed seven days later.

Sadako premiered in Japan on 24 May 2019, and it played on the opening night of the Fantasia International Film Festival. A tie-in manga series, Sadako-san and Sadako-chan, was published in February before the film's release.

== Plot ==
Believing her daughter to be a reincarnation of Sadako Yamamura, clairvoyant Hatsuko Sofue locks her in a closet and prepares to set it on fire. Meanwhile, Sadako's ghost breaks free from a cave in Oshima Island and appears in Hatsuko's apartment. Sadako possesses the girl into setting the apartment on fire via telekinesis, killing five people, including her mother.

One month later at Kurokawa Memorial General Hospital, clinical psychologist Dr. Mayu Akikawa examines her patient, Ms. Kurahashi, who is abnormally obsessed with her. Mayu meets the girl after she fainted from seeing the ghost of a woman who committed suicide. She also learns that the girl was birthed and raised by Hatsuko in secret and that her real name is unknown, only being referred to as Sadako. Mayu's dropout brother Kazuma tries to recover his popularity as a YouTuber with the help of web marketing consultant Yusuke Ishida. Ishida recommends recording a frightening urban experience, prompting Kazuma to visit Hatsuko's apartment.

Meanwhile, the girl telekinetically attacks several children after being teased by them. She escapes to an elevator but faints after seeing the ghost of an old man. Mayu consoles her and learns about her abusive background. The girl later faints after she sees Sadako's ghost on a nearby TV. Ishida informs Mayu about Kazuma's disappearance after he visited Hatsuko's apartment. Mayu watches Kazuma's final YouTube video, where Kazuma runs away from Sadako's ghost in the apartment. The video also contains subliminal images of skulls underwater, which intermittently appears in other unrelated videos watched by Kazuma's followers.

Mayu is later attacked by Kurahashi after she refuses to reciprocate her feelings for her. The girl saves Mayu but Sadako's ghost manifests on a nearby TV and crawls out of it. She forcefully grabs Mayu's arm and traumatizes Kurahashi. The girl also falls into a coma. Mayu learns about Sadako's identity and asks Kurahashi to reveal more information; Sadako was born with deadly powers and after her father murdered her to suppress her powers, her ghost created a curse that killed several people. These victims included Kurahashi's friends, with Kurahashi being revealed to be Masami. Kurahashi informs Mayu that Kazuma is cursed and cannot be saved. That night, Sadako kills Kurahashi. Whilst watching another video of Kazuma's, Mayu sees more subliminal images, including those of a cave, a baby reflected in an eye, bodies rising from the water, a woman falling to her death off a cliff, submerged skulls, and her brother.

Ishida, who also saw these subliminal images, deduces that Sadako was born in Oshima Island and he and Mayu head there to save Kazuma. They visit the cave, which was visited by priests who practiced abstinence before the cave was closed due to a cave-in. The cave was also host to a shrine where parents would kill their unwanted children. Sadako was one of the potential victims as an infant but she survived, causing her to gain her powers. To maintain her powers, Sadako fed on the souls of unwanted children, with the girl being her latest victim. A hand pulls Mayu into the cave's pool, where she sees the disembodied spirit of the girl. The ghosts of the murdered children try to drown her but Mayu saves her, which also causes the girl to recover from her coma. Sadako attacks Mayu but Kazuma, who hid in the cave due to fear, emerges and allows Sadako to kill him instead.

The following day, Mayu barricades herself from Sadako using privacy curtains. The girl visits her and thanks her for saving her life. Suddenly, Sadako removes the curtains and kills Mayu.

== Cast ==
- Elaiza Ikeda as Dr. Mayu Akikawa
- Himeka Himejima as Girl / Sadako Yamamura
- Renn Kiriyama as Minoru Fujii
- Hiroya Shimizu as Kazuma Akikawa
- Rie Tomosaka as Hatsuko Sofue
- Takashi Tsukamoto as Yusuke Ishida
- Hitomi Sato as Masami Kurahashi
- Ayaka Minami as Sadako Yamamura

== Production ==
Producer Reiko Imayasu explained that the project originated from her desire to revisit Sadako's origins after the character had become a widely recognised horror icon. She approached original novelist Koji Suzuki and director Hideo Nakata about developing a new film, with the intention of combining the character's original mythology with contemporary fears surrounding social media and video-sharing websites. Hideo Nakata returned to the franchise for the first time since The Ring Two. In a 2019 interview, Nakata revealed that he had been approached approximately two years earlier to direct another film centred on Sadako, an offer he immediately accepted. He explained that watching Sadako 3D had helped him develop a greater creative distance from the character, making him more comfortable returning to the series.

Nakata said he wanted the film to feel familiar to people who had seen the original Ringu, while also giving younger viewers something new. Nakata also wanted Sadako to return to her scary roots, to contrast the two Sadako 3D films. Elaiza Ikeda was chosen because Nakata wanted a heroine who could project both strength and vulnerability.

== Release ==
Sadako was released theatrically in Japan on 24 May 2019. The film was screened at the 23rd Bucheon International Fantastic Film Festival in South Korea in July 2019, as part of its World Fantastic Red programme. On 11 July, it received its North American premiere as the opening film of the Fantasia International Film Festival in Montreal, Canada.

Internationally, Sadako received theatrical releases in Singapore on May 30, 2019, and Vietnam on July 19. It subsequently opened in Taiwan on August 23, Indonesia on August 28, Hong Kong on September 26, and Malaysia on October 17.

Under the title El aro: capítulo final, the film opened in Peru on October 24, 2019, becoming the first Latin American market to receive a theatrical release. Further theatrical releases followed in Costa Rica and Colombia later that year, and in Argentina on January 2, 2020, Chile on February 6, and Mexico on February 21. The film was released in Ukraine on December 3, 2020, and Russia on December 17, where it was distributed as Zvonok: Poslednyaya glava (The Ring: The Final Chapter).

=== Home media ===
Kadokawa released the film on DVD and Blu-ray in Japan on October 30, 2019. Both formats featured an audio commentary by director Hideo Nakata and actress Elaiza Ikeda. The Blu-ray edition also included behind-the-scenes footage, promotional events, an interview with Nakata, previously unreleased videos featuring Hiroya Shimizu, and a commemorative booklet.

Outside Japan, the film was released on DVD in Hong Kong on 5 December 2019 by Vicol Entertainment, under the title Sadako KOL, with English and Chinese subtitles. A Nordic home-video release followed on 7 September 2020, with a Blu-ray edition distributed by Universal Sony Pictures Home Entertainment featuring Swedish, Danish, Finnish and Norwegian subtitles. The film was also released on DVD in Taiwan under the title Sadako: Origin. In South Korea, Lookus Entertainment released the film on DVD on 1 June 2022, featuring Korean subtitles.

=== Tie-in manga ===
Several manga adaptations and spin-offs accompanied the film's release. A comedy spin-off titled Sadako-san and Sadako-chan, written and illustrated by Aya Tsutsumi, was published in Japan by Kadokawa on 23 May 2019, one day before the film's theatrical release. It was subsequently published in English by Seven Seas Entertainment on 22 June 2021.

Another spin-off, Sadako at the End of the World, written and illustrated by Koma Natsumi, began serialization in Monthly Comic Gene in April 2019. The manga follows Sadako and two young girls in a post-apocalyptic world. Kadokawa published a collected volume on 27 June 2019, followed by an English-language edition from Yen Press on 17 November 2020.

A direct manga adaptation of the film, illustrated by BLZ and also titled Sadako, was published by Kadokawa on 22 November 2019. The collected edition comprises 256 pages.

== Reception ==
On Rotten Tomatoes, the film has an approval rating of 23% based on 26 reviews, with an average rating of 5/10. The website's critics' consensus reads: "Sadako sees a once-terrifying franchise staggering limply to the finish with a rote final chapter that rehashes previous chapters to diminishing returns".

James Marsh of the South China Morning Post gave the film a score of two-and-a-half out of five stars, writing that the film's "balance between the old world and new media is awkward and only intermittently successful, but nevertheless drags this lurching, wayward franchise back in the right direction". Alexandra Heller-Nicholas, writing for the Alliance of Women Film Journalists, commended the film for its exploration of "the deeper, richer psychological terrain which was always in the series", writing positively of its "broad disinterest in continuing rehashing the now thoroughly overcooked cliché of the cursed video as the central narrative core of the film".

Conversely, Meagan Navarro of Bloody Disgusting lamented that the film "presents a wide open world of unexplored possibilities", and concluded that "despite a premise that suggests an attempt to modernize this franchise, nothing has changed at all. What once made Sadako so terrifying [...] has now become far too familiar and ineffective". Polygon's Joelle Monique wrote that the film "[loses] several of the key elements that made the original films terrifying and thrilling"; she criticized the ways in which the film deviates from the franchise's established lore, and negatively characterized the film as having "the lowest body count in Ringu franchise history". Nick Allen of RogerEbert.com noted the film as having "sporadic lukewarm scares" and wrote: "Sadako is far too touch-and-go with its chilling potential, all despite the promise from its creepy young lead (Himeka Himejima) [...] there are so many story pieces that don't build to grandiosity, so much as drag viewers to an underwhelming climax".

== See also ==
- List of ghost films
