= Sadako vs. Kayako =

- Theatrical release poster

Japanese name
- Kanji: 貞子 vs 伽椰子
Transcriptions
- Revised Hepburn: Sadako bāsasu Kayako
- Directed by: Kōji Shiraishi
- Screenplay by: Kōji Shiraishi
- Based on: Ring by Koji Suzuki and Ju-On by Takashi Shimizu
- Starring: Mizuki Yamamoto; Tina Tamashiro
- Production companies: Kadokawa Daiei Studio; NBCUniversal Entertainment Japan
- Distributed by: PKDN Films
- Release date: June 18, 2016 (Japan)
- Running time: 98 minutes
- Country: Japan
- Language: Japanese
- Box office: $9.3 million

Sadako vs. Kayako (Japanese: 貞子 vs 伽椰子, Hepburn: Sadako bāsasu Kayako) is a 2016 Japanese supernatural horror film directed by Kōji Shiraishi. It is a crossover of the Ju-on and Ring series. The film was first teased as an April Fools' joke on April 1, 2015, but was later confirmed on December 10 to be a real production. It was released in Japan on June 18, 2016, Indonesia on August 10 (followed by 4DX on February 15, 2017), and in North America on the streaming site Shudder on January 26, 2017. It received mixed reviews from critics.

== Plot ==
A social worker visits the residence of an elderly woman, only to find her strangled by an electric cord. A nearby video player suddenly turns on and plays the cursed videotape. As she watches, Sadako Yamamura appears and kills her.

The video player is sold at a shop and bought by university students Yuri Kurahashi and Natsumi Ueno. When they find the cursed videotape inside, they play it. The deadline for the curse has been reduced to two days, and the footage has been upgraded to display a decrepit building instead of the usual well. Yuri gets distracted by her phone, leaving Natsumi to watch the tape in its entirety by herself. Afterward, they receive a disturbing phone call as Sadako manifests in the room behind Yuri, startling Natsumi.

A worker at the shop who had watched the cursed tape leaps to her death. The girls return the video player and learn about the deaths related to the tape. Desperate, they go to their professor, an author on urban legends, Shin'ichi Morishige. Obsessed with the idea of meeting Sadako, Morishige eagerly watches the tape, although the girls are less than thrilled, as Natsumi only has one day to live. After he suffers intense headaches due to receiving a phone call, Morishige takes the girls to an exorcist, however, Sadako possesses Natsumi and forces the assistants to kill themselves before the exorcist begins to boil from the inside and kills Morishige for interfering. With her dying breath, the exorcist tells the girls that a man with psychic powers, Keizo Tokiwa, will help them.

When a despondent Natsumi blames Yuri for her situation, Yuri decides to watch the tape herself, hoping that this will pass the curse on to her and Natsumi will be spared. Keizo arrives, accompanied by a blind psychic girl, Tamao, who tells Yuri that she has unnecessarily cursed herself. The only way to expunge the curse is to pit Sadako against another vengeful spirit so both destroy each other. As Yuri learns that Natsumi has uploaded the cursed tape onto the Internet, Natsumi attempts to commit suicide to escape her imminent death. Whilst Yuri rushes to save Natsumi, Sadako appears before Natsumi and kills her by hanging. Keizo and Tamao realize that Sadako has targeted Kayako Saeki to be the rival spirit.

Meanwhile, high school student Suzuka Takagi starts having dreams of the haunted Saeki house after moving in nearby with her family. She runs into Keizo and Tamao, who state that the house beckons to Suzuka; he warns her not to enter the house or she will be killed. After Suzuka leaves, a group of bullies arrives and forces a schoolboy to enter the Saeki house. However, Kayako and Toshio violently drag all of them to their demise, including the schoolboy and the group leader, who gets killed by having his head snapped off by Toshio.

That night, Suzuka thinks she sees a schoolboy inside the Saeki house and goes inside. She sees Toshio, and her screams prompt her parents to rush in, only to be killed by Toshio and Kayako. Keizo saves Suzuka, but she is already cursed. Yuri and Suzuka agree to team up for Keizo's plan, where they enter the Saeki house so that Suzuka can watch the cursed videotape inside and Yuri can see Kayako, thus becoming afflicted with both curses. Keizo hopes this will make Sadako and Kayako fight over the girls and obliterate each other in the process.

As the plan unfolds, Toshio appears, but Sadako drags him inside the TV as he screams. Sadako crawls out of the TV whilst Kayako crawls downstairs, they brutally confront each other, but the battle ends in a stalemate. Keizo reveals his last resort: one of the girls has to lure both ghosts into a well outside the house so they can be sealed inside. Yuri chooses to sacrifice herself, jumping into the well as Sadako and Kayako begin to rush toward her, resulting in a massive collision that bisects Keizo and turns both ghosts into a giant mass of hair, flesh, and eyes. The giant mass falls into the well, presumably crushing Yuri to death. Suzuka seals the well and imprisons the ghosts.

This last resort does not work either, and instead backfires terribly: both Sadako and Kayako's curses combine and become a single entity: Sadakaya. Now possessing Yuri's body with the appearance of Sadako, a combined movement of both spirits, and the sound of Kayako's death rattle. Suzuka screams in horror, and Tamao's psychic powers are overwhelmed. Toshio reappears behind them, and the girls' fates are left unknown.

In a post-credits scene, the modified version of the cursed videotape is shown. Sadakaya menacingly contorts her body, imitating the movements of both Sadako and Kayako. She then teleports to the screen, emitting a death rattle.

== Cast ==
- Mizuki Yamamoto as Yūri Kurahashi/Sadakaya
- Tina Tamashiro as Suzuka Takagi
- Aimi Satsukawa as Natsumi Ueno
- Masahiro Komoto as Shin'ichi Morishige
- Masanobu Andō as Keizō Tokiwa
- Mai Kikuchi as Tamao
- Misato Tanaka as Fumiko Takagi
- Masayoshi Matsushima as Makoto Takagi
- Ichiruko Domen as Hōryū
- Runa Endo as Kayako Saeki
- Elly Nanami as Sadako Yamamura
- Rintaro Shibamoto as Toshio Saeki

== Production ==
Development of Sadako vs. Kayako began in 2014, when Kadokawa Corporation, which controlled the Sadako character, approached NBCUniversal Entertainment Japan, which controlled Kayako, about a potential crossover. According to Kadokawa producer Reiko Imayasu, the company had considered assembling several horror characters in a project inspired by The Avengers. The film was promoted through an April Fools' Day poster in 2015, although development of the story had already begun. A teaser was subsequently included at the end of Ju-On: The Final Curse (2015).

The producers sought to give both characters equal prominence while combining the different supernatural rules established by their respective franchises. An early version of the story involved a family of ghostbusters moving into Kayako's house to provoke a confrontation between the two spirits. The storyline was subsequently revised following the involvement of director Kōji Shiraishi, who was selected partly because he had not previously worked on either franchise.

The roles of Sadako, Kayako and Toshio were filled through auditions. Elly Nanami was selected to portray Sadako for her slender appearance and graceful movements, while Runa Endo was chosen as Kayako for her flexibility and intimidating physical performance. Shiraishi also sought a different appearance for Toshio, resulting in the casting of Rintaro Shibamoto.

The film's theme song is "Noroi no Shananana" (呪いのシャ・ナ・ナ・ナ) by the heavy metal band Seikima-II. It was released as part of a double A-side single on June 15, 2016, which also included an English-language version of the song.

== Promotion and marketing ==
Several events were held for the promotion of the movie. On Twitter, users could vote for either Sadako or Kayako as their favorite horror icon up until the day of the film's release. Two videos, one for Sadako and one for Kayako and Toshio, were uploaded to YouTube to appeal to voters. Sadako won. At the end of May, a press conference was held to promote the film. As with the previous Ju-on films, Sadako, Kayako, and Toshio were present, in costume, and stayed true to their roles. In the beginning of June, a baseball match featuring the Nippon-Ham Fighters and the Yakult Swallows was interrupted by Sadako, Kayako, and Toshio who staged the first pit ceremony. Other videos were released at the same time, featuring the ghosts of the movie teaching theater etiquette, such as not bringing recording devices or avoiding to take minors to see the movie. Social media was also heavily used to promote the movie. A Twitter account created for Sadako (as a promotion for the Sadako 3D movie) was reused. An Instagram account was created for Kayako and Toshio, depicting humorous, everyday life situations with the two ghosts. Promotional items playing on the Kawaii culture regularly seen in Japan were released. These items included cup hangers, beauty masks and even a collaboration with the Hello Kitty brand. Other items were more traditional, such as T-shirts, key rings and doorknob hangers.

On December 2–4, and December 9–25, 2016, they began to promote Kayako and Sadako into the virtual reality at Laforet Harajuku, as they held a virtual experience to celebrate the film's home video release.

== Release ==
Sadako vs. Kayako was released theatrically in Japan on June 18, 2016, distributed by Kadokawa. International theatrical releases followed in Singapore on June 23, distributed by Encore Films and Golden Village Pictures, and Russia on July 14. The film subsequently opened in the Philippines on July 27, Taiwan on August 5, Indonesia on August 10, and Malaysia and Thailand on August 18.

The film screened at FrightFest in London on August 27, 2016. It received its North American premiere at the 2016 Toronto International Film Festival, where it was selected as the closing film of the Midnight Madness programme. Other festival appearances included MOTELX in Portugal, the Sitges Film Festival and the San Sebastián Horror and Fantasy Film Festival in Spain.

Further theatrical releases followed in Hong Kong on October 6, 2016, Bolivia on November 10, and South Korea on January 4, 2017. The film opened in Mexico in June 2017 under the title El Aro vs. La Maldición.

=== Home media ===
Sadako vs. Kayako was released on DVD and Blu-ray in Japan on December 2, 2016, by NBCUniversal Entertainment Japan. A premium edition included behind-the-scenes footage, a commemorative booklet and promotional ghost photographs. The film was subsequently released on DVD and Blu-ray in Hong Kong on December 13, 2016.

The film was made available with English subtitles through the streaming service Shudder in the United States and United Kingdom on January 26, 2017.

In Italy, the film was released on DVD and Blu-ray by Eagle Pictures on January 31, 2018, under the title La battaglia dei demoni – Sadako vs Kayako. A Brazilian DVD edition was released by Flashstar Filmes in December 2018, featuring Japanese and Portuguese audio.

== Reception ==
The film has received mixed reviews. On the review aggregator website Rotten Tomatoes, 48% of 21 critics' reviews are positive, with an average rating of 5.4/10. John Squires of Bloody Disgusting complained that the title was deceptive: "It's not merely that it takes too long to get to the good stuff, it's that the good stuff never comes at all". He further stated the film was just not interesting: "Feeling like a reboot of The Ring crudely smashed together with a reboot of The Grudge, the film hardly brings the two franchises together in any sort of creative fashion, and it's all very clunky; worse yet, it's incredibly boring". Joe Lipsett, also writing for Bloody Disgusting, agreed saying that "the biggest flaw of Sadako vs. Kayako is that it takes far, far too long to get the titular to face off.....Even the narrative hoops required to bring the two franchises together don't hold up under scrutiny!"

More positive reviews include Chris Alexander, writing for Comingsoon.net, who found the film to be "goofy but entertaining". Katie Rife for The A.V. Club admitted that the "vs" in the title came up short, but said: "Still, for fans of Japanese horror looking for popcorn entertainment, or for fans of Western horror looking for something different-yet-familiar, it's worth indulging your curiosity for 98 minutes".

== See also ==
- Freddy vs. Jason
- Alien vs. Predator
- The Ring (franchise)
- Ju-On (franchise)
- List of ghost films
