= Sadako DX =

2022 Japanese supernatural comedy horror film

- Theatrical release poster

Japanese name
- Kanji: 貞子 DX
Transcriptions
- Revised Hepburn: Sadako DX
- Directed by: Hisashi Kimura
- Screenplay by: Yuya Takahashi
- Starring: Fuka Koshiba; Kazuma Kawamura; Mario Kuroba
- Music by: Kôji Endô
- Production company: Kadokawa Daiei Studio
- Distributed by: Kadokawa
- Release dates: 30 July 2022 (Fantasia Fest); 28 October 2022
- Running time: 100 minutes
- Country: Japan
- Language: Japanese
- Box office: $3.1 million

Sadako DX (Note: DX is an acronym of sorts for digital transformation.) (Japanese: 貞子 DX) is a 2022 Japanese supernatural comedy horror film directed by Hisashi Kimura. The film is an installment in the Ring franchise, and a distant sequel to 1998's Ring ignoring the events of the Spiral and Ring 2 timelines respectively. Sadako DX stars Fuka Koshiba as a quick-witted college student who has to unravel the cursed videotape after finding out her sister has seen it, discovering that the curse now claims the victim's life only 24 hours after viewing it. Sadako DX also stars Kazuma Kawamura and Mario Kuroba.

Sadako DX premiered at the 2022 Fantasia International Film Festival. It was released in Japan on 28 October the same year.

== Plot ==
Ayaka Ichijo (Fuka Koshiba), a graduate student and prodigy with an alleged IQ of 200, is introduced to the cursed videotape by psychic and fortune teller Master Kenshin (Hiroyuki Ikeuchi) on a televised variety show. He claims that while the tape has previously killed their victims in seven days, a new variant has emerged from a darknet market that kills the viewer in 24 hours. Ayaka doubts the validity of the tape's curse but brings the tape home to investigate it at Kenshin's request.

Later that night, Ayaka's sister Futaba (Yuki Yagi) watches the tape out of curiosity. The footage depicts Sadako climbing from the well in the first person, revealing a view of Futaba's current location inside the house once she climbs over the edge. After this, Futaba begins seeing Sadako following her while at school, taking the form of people she knows. This pressures Ayaka to research the video tape further, leading her back to Master Kenshin's office. There, she finds the easily frightened Oji Maeda (Kazuma Kawamura) threatening to throw himself off a building rather than face the curse. Ayaka talks him away from the edge by explaining how painful it would be and how he would likely not die from that height. The two meet Master Kenshin, who attempts to exorcise the videotape. During this exorcism, Ayaka views the tape with Kenshin and Oji. Kenshin claims that he has successfully exorcised the curse, but Ayaka doubts this and researches the video tape further.

Ayaka contacts a germaphobic Hikikomori, going by "Kanden" online, who has also been researching the cursed video. The two theorize on the mechanics of the new videotape, discussing its relation to the small-pox virus, and what larger role it plays in getting the curse to spread. Kanden theorizes that the curse has mutated to spread better in the digital age by reducing the incubation period and encouraging faster spread. During this discussion, Oji passes the 24-hour mark since watching the tape, seemingly surviving the curse. This leads him to believe that the exorcism has worked, but Ayaka and Kanden both disagree and settle on a theory that it must be because he watched the tape with his, now-dead, girlfriend. They analogize it to being like immunization; by having more people watch, the curse is spread thinner and thus each viewer is only exposed to a non-fatal dose. Their immune system then fights it off, and the curse no longer has an effect.

With only a few minutes remaining, Ayaka contacts her sister and mother, telling her mother to watch the tape with Futaba. This seemingly works, and Futaba survives past the 24-hour mark. Believing her troubles to be over, Ayaka posts the video online and tells everyone to watch it, which she believes will immunize the public to the curse. Kanden, however, says that his research is not over, as he has yet to solve the mystery of who sold the tape in the first place. Later, Ayaka realizes that it was Master Kenshin himself who spread the tape.

Ayaka confronts Kenshin, and it is revealed that he has purposefully spread the curse as a way to generate viewership for his show. As a child, Kenshin worked at a shrine with his father, who performed "exorcisms" for cash and came into possession of the cursed tape via two of its victims looking to be freed. Disillusioned with his father's work, he came to believe that his destiny was to fulfill the human desire for excitement. In his own words, spreading the curse was "his own brand of entertainment". Immediately following this revelation, Kenshin drops dead from the curse, invalidating Ayaka's theory of group viewership as an immunization.

Desperate for answers, and realizing that her uploading the video was exactly what Sadako wanted, Ayaka visits Kenshin's father's shrine. There, they find that Kanden is waiting for them in full gas mask and lab coat, having gotten bored trying to solve the mystery from his room. Ayaka calls her mother and sister to the shrine as the three attempt to solve the curse once and for all. Ayaka thinks back to the pattern that the curse has been following and realizes that the solution is not group viewership, but rather repeat viewership; to constantly subject one's self to the curse at least once every 24 hours. In the last few minutes before their deadlines, Ayaka, Oji, Kanden, Futaba, and her mother all rewatch the tape, saving them from death.

An unspecified amount of time later, all of them meet via video chat to rewatch the tape. As they all prepare to rewatch the tape in the minutes before their deadlines, Oji realizes that he has forgotten to rewind the tape since the last viewing. During his desperate attempt to rewind the tape before it is too late, his phone runs out of power.

A post-credits sequence shows a now-gigantic Sadako emerging from the well into a movie theater, much like in the cursed video, whereupon the audience panics at the sight of her. She looks at the screen to reveal that it simply reads "END".

== Cast ==
- Fuka Koshiba as Ayaka Ichijo
- Kazuma Kawamura as Oji Maeda
- Mario Kuroba as Kanden/Takashi
- Hiroyuki Ikeuchi as Master Kenshin
- Yuki Yagi as Futaba, Ayaka's sister
- Maho Toyota (guest appearance)

== Production ==
Producer Reiko Imayasu described Sadako (2019) as a return to the franchise's origins that brought one phase of the series to a close. For Sadako DX, the filmmakers instead sought to adapt the character to the era of digital transformation and social media, exploring how her curse could spread through online platforms. Imayasu also explained that the production sought to challenge traditional horror conventions by introducing a rational female protagonist who dismisses supernatural explanations, contrasting her with a more easily frightened male companion. The producers also wanted to blend comedy and horror, selecting Hisashi Kimura as director as the producers believed he could balance both genres.

== Music ==
The film's theme song, "Replay", is performed by Sandaime J Soul Brothers.

== Release ==
Sadako DX had its world premiere at the 2022 Fantasia International Film Festival on 30 July, followed by its release in Japan on 28 October. The film was also selected for the Critics Selection programme at the 2022 Brussels International Fantastic Film Festival in Belgium. On October 28, 2022, it was screened at the 33rd San Sebastián Horror and Fantasy Film Festival in Spain as part of the Japan Gaua programme, alongside Welcome to the Occult Forest: The Movie. It subsequently received its United Kingdom premiere at the 36th Leeds International Film Festival on 5 November 2022, with a second screening held on 7 November, as part of the festival's Fanomenon programme.

The film received international theatrical releases in Malaysia on November 3, 2022, Indonesia on November 25, Singapore on December 1, Vietnam on December 2, and Hong Kong on December 8. A Russian theatrical release followed on December 15.

In Latin America, Sadako DX opened in Colombia on January 19, 2023, followed by Argentina and Chile on February 9 and Bolivia on February 23, under the title El Aro 4. It was released in Brazil on April 27, 2023, under the title O Chamado 4: Samara Ressurge, distributed by Paris Filmes. Further releases followed in Taiwan on June 2 and Mexico on June 8.

=== Home media ===
Kadokawa released the film on DVD and Blu-ray in Japan on April 14, 2023. The Japanese Blu-ray deluxe edition included a bonus DVD containing making-of footage, promotional event recordings and trailers, alongside an audio commentary featuring Fuka Koshiba and Kazuma Kawamura, and a booklet.

In Brazil, where the film was released under the title O Chamado 4: Samara Ressurge, it became available on the Claro TV+ streaming service on 26 July 2023. It was subsequently added to Netflix in Brazil on 20 October 2023, with Japanese-language audio and Portuguese subtitles.

== Reception ==
=== Box office ===
In Japan, Sadako DX opened in 351 cinemas and debuted at number five at the weekend box office on October 29–30, 2022. The film grossed ¥305 million during its Japanese theatrical run.

Internationally, the film was released in Brazil under the title O Chamado 4: Samara Ressurge. According to the Brazilian National Cinema Agency, it opened across 447 screens and attracted 77,313 admissions, grossing R$1.52 million.

=== Critical response ===
Critically, Sadako DX received a mixed reception from critics and an overall negative reception from audiences.

The film received praise from Bloody Disgusting's Luiz H. C. for its willingness to experiment with the franchise and for its memorable ensemble of characters, but he also criticized it for its inconsistent tone and occasionally disappointing makeup and effects work, ultimately earning it a score of 3/5. Mark Schilling of The Japan Times gave it a more favorable review, praising it for exploring a meta-commentary angle to the series while keeping stakes high, giving the film a 3.5/5. The film was also received positively by Michael Gingold of Rue Morgue, who praised it as the most effective reboot the series had seen in a while.

The film holds a 2.6/5 audience review score on Japanese film information site eiga.com.

== See also ==
- List of ghost films
