= Bunshinsaba =

Bunshinsaba may refer to:

- Bunshinsaba (2004 film), a South Korean horror film
- Bunshinsaba (2012 film), a Chinese horror film
