= Mei Ting =

Chinese actress

- Born: 30 April 1975 (age 51); Nanjing, Jiangsu, China
- Education: Central Academy of Drama
- Occupation: Actress
- Years active: 1994–present
- Spouses: Yan Po (m. 2001; div. 2007) Zeng Jian (m. 2012)
- Children: 2

Mei Ting (Chinese: 梅婷, born 30 April 1975) is a Chinese actress. She received the Best Actress awards at the 22nd Cairo International Film Festival and 5th Huabiao Awards for her performance in A Time to Remember (1997).

== Early life ==
In the 1980s, at age 7, Mei Ting enrolled in the "Art Troupe of Little Red Flowers" a famous art and performance group and school for talented children in Nan Jing, her home town. At age 9, she played a role in film The Moon in Moon Festival. When she was 13, she started her career as a dancer in "Song & Dance Troupe of Frontier Line". At 19 in 1994. she was invited to play a major role in the TV series Red Cherry.

== Career ==
In 1996, Mei Ting was admitted into the prestige Central Academy of Drama in Beijing, Department of Acting. Among her classmates were Zhang Ziyi, Qin Hailu, Yuan Quan and Hu Jing, dubbed as the "Five Golden Flowers of the Class 1996". During her college years, she was already invited to act in a number of TV series. To everyone's surprise, the second year after her enrollment, she made a difficult decision to suspend her college study to dedicate herself fully to the appointed roles in a number of TV series.

In 1997, she played the role as "Qiu Qiu" in "A Time to Remember", with Leslie Cheung being "Jin", as a true to life character with exact and elaborate portrayal as well as exquisite depiction. She won the "Best Actress" award for her role in this film at the 22nd Cairo International Film Festival and Huabiao Awards. As an industrious and productive actress, Mei Ting acted in more than 10 movies and TV series between 1997 and 2001.

== Personal life ==
She was married to film director Yan Po from 2001 until 2007.

In 2012, she married cinematographer Zeng Jian and has two children with him.

== Filmography ==
=== Film ===
Year	English title	Chinese title	Role	Notes
1997	A Time to Remember	红色恋人	Qiu Qiu	
1999	Dragon Boat Regatta	赛龙夺锦	Zhen Zhen	
2002	Dazzling	花眼	Xin Moli	
2006	Aspirin	阿司匹林	Wen Jing	
2008	Desires of the Heart	桃花运	Zhang Ying	
2009	Judge	透析		
2011	1911	辛亥革命	Chen Yiying	
2012	Bunshinsaba	笔仙	Xiao Ai	
2013	Unbeatable	激战	Wang Mingjun	
2014	Blind Massage	推拿	Du Hong	
2015	Crazy New Year's Eve	一路惊喜	Zhang Weiwei	
2017	The House That Never Dies II	京城81号II	Niu Menghe/He Fei	
2019	The Big Shot	大人物		
2019	Desire Game	欲念游戏		Cameo
2021	Moses on the Plains	平原上的摩西		

=== Television series ===
Year	English title	Chinese title	Role	Notes
1994	Pure Red Hearts	血色童心	Chu Chu	
1997	The Story of the North	北方故事	Mei Duo	
1999	The Hometown	家园	Fang Ying	
2000	One Big Family	南北一家亲	Yao Hongnian	
2000	Heart Web	心网	Zhuo Ning/Yue Min	
2000	The Way of No Return	别无选择	Yuan Shalang	
2001	Love Again	让爱重来	Lei Yuanyuan	
2001	Meeting Aquarium	海洋馆的约会	Shi Yu	
2001	Huo Yuanjia	霍元甲	Nong Jingqiu	
2002	Don't Respond to Strangers	不要和陌生人说话	Hai Xiangnan	
2002	Blessing of Safety	平安是福	Le Xian	
2002	Heroic Era	激情年代	Bai Yun	
2002	Green Flower	绿萝花	Yi Rui	
2003	Iron Youth	铁血青春	Ouyang Wen	
2003	In the Next Life	夜幕较量	Wu Tong	
2003	Who to Depend on	谁可相依	Mei Hongyu	
2003	Heroic Age	英雄时代	Mei Hongyu	
2004	Camphor Tree	香樟树	Sima Xiaobin	
2005	Close to You, Warm Me	靠近你温暖我	Fang Hedan	
2005	Mutiny 1938	兵变1938	Xiao Ya	
2006	Glass Marriage	玻璃婚	Jiang Xiaowen	
2006	New Age of Marriage	新结婚时代	Jian Jia	
2007	Stage Sisters	舞台姐妹	Lan Chunhua	
2007	You Must be Happy	你一定要幸福	Qin Mingzhen	
2007	Women Tears	女人泪	Zhao Qingjian	
2007	Police Story	警察故事之红飘带	Yang Yue	
2008	The Spring of the City	城市里的春天	Xu Xiaoman	
2008	How Far is Happiness	幸福还有多远	Li Ping	
2008	Pretty Things	漂亮的事	Shen Han	
2010	Zhang Juzheng	万历首辅张居正	Empress Dowager Li	
2010	Cellphone	手机	Yu Wenjuan	
2011	Walking on the Tip	刀尖上行走	Lin Yingying	
2012	The Bachelor	大男当婚	Gu Qing	
2012	Thirty Years of Age	而立之年	Zong Xiaoming	
2014	Romance of Our Parents	父母爱情	An Jie	
2015	Ladies and Boys	淑女涩男	Fiona	Cameo
2015	Horrible Bosses	恶老板	Sha Liwei	
2017	Stairway to Stardom	逆袭之星途璀璨		Cameo
2017	The First Half of My Life	我的前半生		Special appearance
2017	Nirvana in Fire 2	琅琊榜之风起长林	Empress	
2017	Love is the Source of Joy	爱是欢乐的源泉	Zhu Jiaxiang	
2018	The Mask	面具	Yao Lan	
2018	Always with You	陪读妈妈	Li Na	
2018	Give Me An 18 Year Old	给我一个十八岁	Tian Yu	
2018	Mad House	疯人院	Su Shengping	
2018	The Rise of Phoenixes	天盛长歌	Ya Le	Cameo
2019	On the Road	在远方	Liu Ailian	
2020	Twenty Again	我的不惑青春	He Peijin	
2020	Together	在一起	Ma Yun	
2026	Swords Into Plowshares	太平年	Lady Yu	

=== Stage plays ===
Year	Title	Role	Notes
1998	Counterfeit Faust		
1998	Everyone has a Bright Red Heart		

== Awards ==
Year	Title		Role	Notes
1996	6th Chunyan Awards	Best Actress	Pure Red Hearts	
1998	22nd Cairo International Film Festival	Best Actress	A Time to Remember	
1999	5th Huabiao Awards	Outstanding Actress	A Time to Remember	
2003	21st China TV Golden Eagle Award	Audience's Choice for Actress	Love Again	
2007	11th Golden Phoenix Awards	Society Award	—N/a	
2015	15th Chinese Film Media Awards	Best Supporting Actress	Blind Massage	
2015	30th Flying Apsaras Awards	Outstanding Actress	Romance of Our Parents	
2017	4th The Actors of China Awards	Best Actress (Sapphire)	—N/a	
