= Perfect Blue (TV series) =

- Genre: Drama
- Created by: Miyuki Miyabe
- Written by: Junya Yamazaki; Yūya Takahashi
- Directed by: Akihiro Karaki; Mineya Tanaka; Masashi Asami
- Starring: Miori Takimoto; Naomi Zaizen; Yasufumi Terawaki; Aya Hirayama; Eiichiro Funakoshi
- Ending theme: "My Perfect Blue" by Kō Shibasaki
- Country of origin: Japan
- Original language: Japanese
- No. of episodes: 11

Production
- Producers: Junichirō Shiraishi; Yoshihiro Haruno

Original release
- Network: TBS
- Release: 8 October – 17 December 2012

Perfect Blue (パーフェクト・ブルー) is a 2012 Japanese television drama series. It is based on the novel Perfect Blue by Miyuki Miyabe.

It debuted on 8 October 2012. The theme song of the series was sung by Kou Shibasaki.

== Cast ==
- Miori Takimoto as Kayoko Hasumi
- Aya Hirayama as Nana Kimizuka
- Kensei Mikami as Shunichi Miyamoto
- Kumiko Shiratori as Momoko Nagashima
- Taishi Nakagawa as Shinya Morooka
- Haori Takahashi as Itoko Hasumi
- Kaori Asō as Ruriko Ejima
- Eiichiro Funakoshi as Masa (voice)
- Toshie Negishi as Michiko Miura
- Tetsu Watanabe as Tetsu Fujinaga
- Yasufumi Terawaki as Yūsuke Shiina
- Naomi Zaizen as Kyōko Hasumi

Preceded by Naniwa Shōnen Tanteidan (2 July 2012 – 17 September 2012)	TBS Panasonic Drama Theater; Mondays 20:00 – 20:54 (JST)	Succeeded by Hanchou: Keishichō Azumihan (14 January 2013 – 18 March 2013)
