= The Ring: Terror's Realm =

2000 video game

- North American Dreamcast cover art
- Developer: Asmik Ace Entertainment
- Publishers: JP: Asmik Ace Entertainment; NA: Infogrames North America
- Director: Atsushi Suzuki
- Producer: Hitoshi Iida
- Programmer: Atsushi Suzuki
- Artist: Yoshimi Kaida
- Writer: Hisaya Takabayashi
- Composer: Yoshiyuki Ishii
- Series: The Ring
- Platform: Dreamcast
- Release: JP: February 24, 2000; NA: September 26, 2000
- Genre: Survival horror
- Mode: Single-player

The Ring: Terror's Realm (known simply as Ring (リング, Ringu) in Japan) is a survival horror video game developed and published by Asmik Ace Entertainment in Japan and published by Infogrames North America in North America. It was released for Dreamcast on February 24, 2000 in Japan and September 26 in North America (it was originally set for a June 28 release date, but was delayed for unknown reasons). It is based on the Ring series of novels by Japanese author Koji Suzuki, which also inspired the Japanese film Ring (1998) and its American remake, The Ring (2002).

== Gameplay ==
The Ring: Terror's Realm is a survival horror adventure game in which players control Meg Rainman while investigating a series of mysterious deaths connected to a computer program called Ring. Gameplay takes place across two distinct environments: the real world, where Meg explores a research facility, interacts with other characters and collects clues, and a virtual world accessed through the mysterious program. The virtual environment introduces action-oriented sequences in which players encounter hostile creatures, explore unfamiliar locations and attempt to uncover the connection between the two worlds.

== Plot ==
Meg Rainman is a newly-hired researcher at the Centers for Disease Control (CDC) in the United States. Her boyfriend Robert is among four workers at the CDC who have died mysteriously on the same day, and the only thing that connects them is a program found in their computers, called "RING". When the CDC is put under lockdown, Meg finds herself imprisoned in the center with her co-workers, and inside the CDC Meg must find out the truth behind Robert's death and the "RING".

== Development and release ==
The game was previewed in Japan by Dreamcast Magazine in November 1999. The publication introduced it in the context of the Ring film franchise, including the films Ring, Rasen and Ring 2. Rather than directly reproducing the events of the films, the game featured a new storyline set in the United States, in which the supernatural threat was associated with a mysterious computer program rather than a cursed videotape. In February 2000, the magazine reported that development was 100 percent complete and published additional information about the game's characters and storyline. The same preview discussed the game's relationship to the existing films, including the newly released Ring 0: Birthday.

== Characters ==
Meg Rainman

The game's protagonist and main character, takes Robert's position at the CDC after he dies at the start of the game.

Robert

Researcher at the CDC, was working on the Ring virus before he and three other colleagues die on the same day.

Jack Nikson

Works as a reporter, neighbour and friend of Meg and Robert.

John Brad

Boss at the CDC.

Chris

Co-worker at the CDC, works on the ground floor.

Kathy

Co-worker at the CDC, has a striking resemblance to Tina Turner, likes to cause trouble and is the girlfriend of Lukino.

Timothy

An old doctor working at the CDC.

Lukino

The CDC's security chief, has six piercings, two on both ears and one on the nose and left eye, and is the boyfriend of Kathy.

== Reception ==
Reception

Aggregate score
Aggregator	Score
GameRankings	35%

Review scores
Publication	Score
AllGame	1.5/5
CNET Gamecenter	3/10
Electronic Gaming Monthly	4.67/10
Famitsu	24/40
GameSpot	4.6/10
GameSpy	1/10
IGN	5.4/10
Next Generation	1/5

The game received "unfavorable" reviews according to the review aggregation website GameRankings. In Japan, Famitsu gave it a score of 24 out of 40.

In a review submitted to "the ringworld", a fansite dedicated to Ring, contributors C. Gavlas and K. Gavlas called it "a crude, clumsy Resident Evil-style survival horror video game" and "a pretty depressing homage to Ring." Those unfamiliar with Suzuki's works were equally unimpressed. Jeremy Dunham of IGN said, "The lowest rung on the ladder of Dreamcast survival horror games, The Ring: Terror's Realm is just an average jaunt into the dark side," while a contributor to the PlanetDreamcast website (a part of GameSpy) declared it "hands-down the worst thing I've ever experienced on the Dreamcast." GameSpot concluded in the review of the Japanese import that "Die-hard survival-horror fans might possibly get a quick fix from this game, but even that's questionable. You'd really be better off playing through Code Veronica again." Jim Preston of NextGen said of the game, "If it were a hamster, we would bury it in a shoebox in the backyard."

According to NPD sales figures reproduced by Blast Processing!, The Ring: Terror's Realm had sold 14,238 copies in North America by March 2003.
