= Fourth Ring Road =

Fourth Ring Road may refer to:

- 4th Ring Road (Beijing), China
- Fourth Ring Road (Wuhan), China
- Ring 4 Route, a super bikeways in metropolitan Copenhagen, Denmark
- Ring 4 (Danish: Motorring 4), one of the motorways in Denmark
- Vierter Ring unfinished ring road of the Reichs Capital Germania, Germany
- Fourth Ring Road (Moscow), Russia

== See also ==
- List of ring roads
- Ring 4 (disambiguation)
