= Rie Inō =

Japanese actress

- 伊野尾 理枝
- Born: 1967 (age 58–59); Tokyo, Japan
- Occupation: Actress
- Notable work: Ring; Ring 2

Rie Inō (伊野尾理枝, Inō Rie; born 16 March 1967, in Tokyo, Japan) is a Japanese kabuki and film actress best known for her portrayal of Sadako Yamamura in the film Ring and its sequel Ring 2.

== Career ==
Inō first became a kabuki actress with the Banyû Inryoku theater troupe in 1987. Since then, she has frequently participated in shows, sometimes choreographing and directing them. She also dubs performances into Japanese Sign Language. She was cast in the 1998 horror film Ring as the vengeful ghost Sadako Yamamura. For this role, she walked backwards in a disjointed manner. The footage was then reversed to create a creepy and unnatural sense of movement. Sadako's long hair in the film was all Inō's, and she wore no wig or hair extensions for the role. Her performance in Ring was so well-received that she returned as Sadako in Ring 2 despite having given birth a few months prior. While on set, she breastfed her baby while still in costume. She would later discuss her role as Sadako in the 2024 documentary film The J-Horror Virus.

== Filmography ==
Year	Title	Role	Refs.
1998	Ring	Sadako Yamamura	
1999	Ring 2	Sadako Yamamura	
2024	The J-Horror Virus	Herself	
