= Miori Takimoto =

Japanese actress and former singer (born 1991)

- 瀧本 美織
- Born: October 16, 1991 (age 34); Tottori, Tottori Prefecture, Japan
- Occupations: Actress; Singer
- Years active: 2002–present
- Agent: Stardust Promotion
- Musical career
- Also known as: MIORI
- Genres: J-pop; Rock; Pop rock
- Instrument: Vocals
- Labels: Avex Trax (SweetS); Sony Records (Lagoon)
- Website: mioritakimoto.com

Miori Takimoto (瀧本 美織, Takimoto Miori; born October 16, 1991) is a Japanese actress and a former singer. She debuted in 2003 as a singer of the girl group Sweets, where she performed under the name Miori. After Sweets disbanded, she appeared on television as an actress.

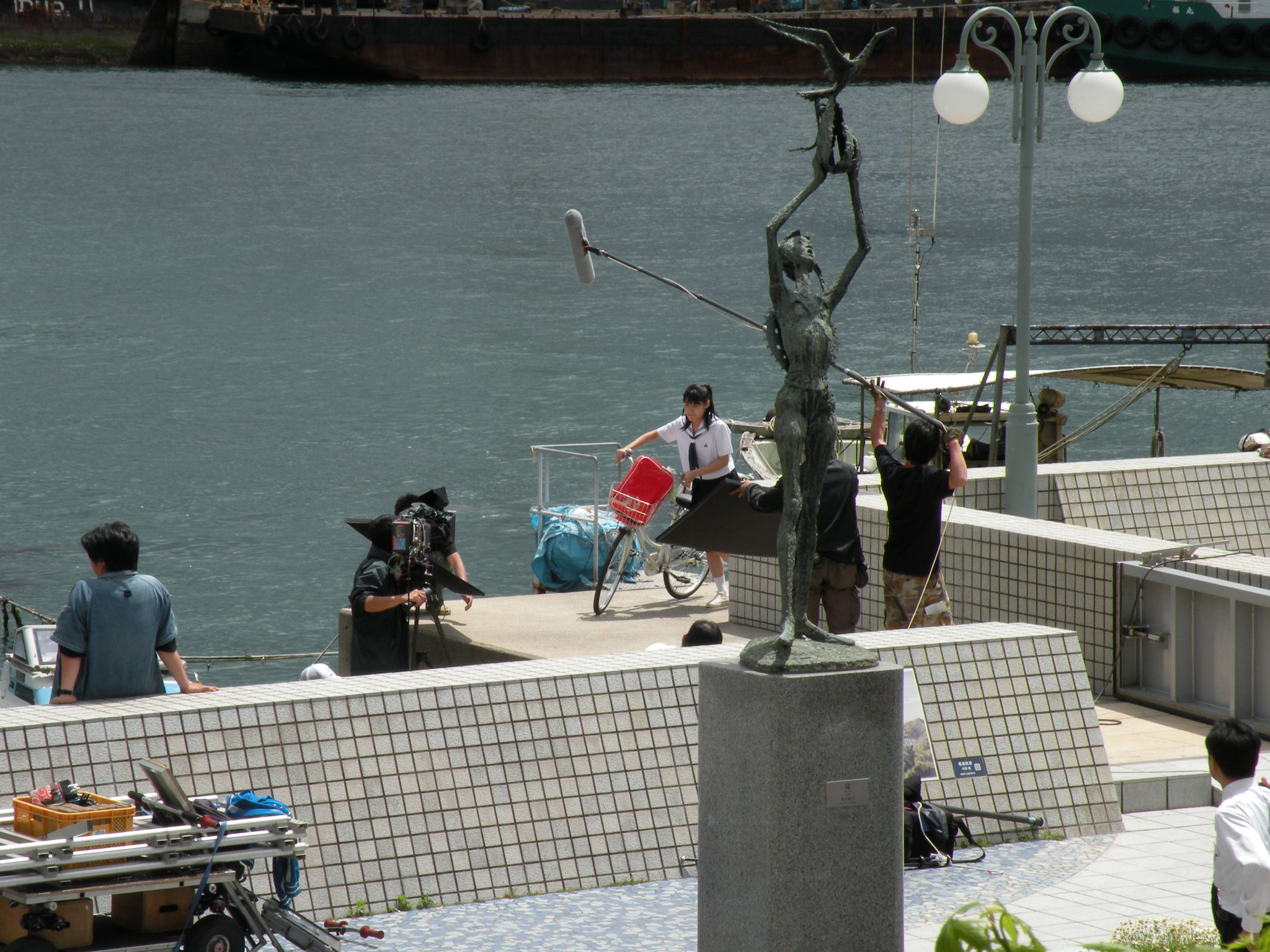
Scene from Teppan being filmed on location, 2010

== Biography ==
Miori Takimoto was born in Tottori, Tottori Prefecture, and began her professional career as a member of the former group SweetS, signed by avex. She was chosen from the avex trax 2002–2003 auditions, and the group debuted on August 27, 2003. During these years, she had side projects such as modelling for magazines and acting in Waseda Academy commercials. Miori and her fellow ex-SweetS members parted ways on June 7, 2006.

Upon leaving the music business, she pursued a career in acting. She appeared in a music video for Himari in November 2007. Miori signed with Stardust and since then has appeared in the film Higanjima, Yui's "Never Say Die" music video, and commercials. In November 2014, she debuted with the band Lagoon (ラグーン) as the vocalist.

== Works ==
=== TV dramas ===
- Teppan (NHK, 2010–2011), Akari Murakami
- He is Beautiful (美男ですね) (TBS, 2011), Mio Sakuraba
- Hungry! (ハングリー！) (KTV, 2012), role of Chie Okusu
- Mike-Neko Holmes no Suiri Episode 2 (NTV, 2012), Ryōko Kanezaki
- Miyuki Miyabe 4-shū Renzoku Mystery "Level 7" (TBS, 2012), Mai Shingyōji
- GTO (NTV, 2012), Azusa Fuyutsuki
  - Aki mo Oni Abare Special (2012)
  - Shōgatsu Special! Fuyuyasumi mo Nekketsu Jugyō da (2013)
  - Kanketsu-hen: Saraba Onizuka! Sotsugyō Special (2013)
- Miyuki Miyabe Mystery "Perfect Blue" (TBS, 2012), Kayoko Hasumi
- Tsuma wa, Kunoichi (NHK BS Premium, 2013), Orie
- Umi no Ueno Shinryōjo Episode 4 (Fuji TV, 2013), Michiru Fujii
- Dr.DMAT (TBS, 2014), Haruko Yakumo
- Satsujin Hensachi 70 (NTV, 2014), Rikako Mayama
- Cabin Attendant Keiji: New York Satsujin Jiken (Fuji TV, 2014), Yui Watabe
- Tsuma wa, Kunoichi: Saishūshō (NHK BS Premium, 2014), Orie
- Hula Girl to Inu no Choco (TV Tokyo, 2015), Sae Morita
- Keisei Saimin no Otoko Part 2 "Kobayashi Ichizō: Yume to Soroban" (NHK, 2015), Kou Tanba/Kou Kobayashi
- Final Life (2017), Kana Ayatsuji
- Auditor Shuhei Nozaki (2018)
- Fubuki Koshiji Monogatari (2018), Fubuki Koshiji
- Brother and Sister (2018), Sachi
- Unmei Kara Hajimaru Koi: You Are My Destiny (2020), Aya Sato
- Zaibatsu Fukushū (2025), Erika Ise
- Shinu Hodo Aishite (2025), Mio Kamishiro
- Tokyo Holiday (2025), Sakurako Ishida

=== Films ===
- Higanjima (2010), Yuki
- Shokudou Katatsumuri (2010)
- The Wind Rises (2013), voice of Naoko Satomi
- Sadako 3D 2 (2013), Fūko Andō
- Tensai Bakavon: Yomigaeru Flanders no Inu (2015), voice of Nero
- Hokusai (2021), Koto
- The Floor Plan (2024), Ayano Katabuchi

=== Commercials ===
- Circle K Bakery (2004)
- Waseda Academy (2005)
- Sony Sonpo Campaign (2009)
- Astellas Pharma Inc. and Pfizer Ltd. (2009)
- Asahi Soft Drinks "Mitsuya Cider" (2011)
- Asahi Fiber Glass "Aclear" (2011)
- Toyo Suisan (2012)
- Bourbon "Slow Bar" (2012)
- Godiva Chocolatier Short Movie 2014 (2014)
- Lixil (2014)

=== TV animations ===
- Magic Kaito 1412 (まじっく快斗1412) (YTV, 2015), Jody Hopper

=== Music Videos ===
- 2007 – Himari's "Akeneiro, Sora no Shita"
- 2009 – Fukuramu SUKURAMU's "Natsu no Hi"
- 2009 – YUI's "Never Say Die"
- 2010 – Stereophony's "Hanbunko"

=== Live Performances ===
- December 27, 2009 – 3-B Junior Live
- February 14, 2010 – 3-B Junior Special Valentine's Live

=== Dubbing ===
- Clarice (Clarice Starling (Rebecca Breeds))

== Bibliography ==
=== Books ===
- SDP Bunko Dai 3-dan: Mori Ougai "Takasebune" (November 17, 2008, SDP), cover ISBN 9784903620367
- Takimoto Miori Photobook "Issho ni Hashiro!!" (August 10, 2013, Kadokawa Media House) ISBN 9784048949408

=== Magazines ===
- Mina, Shufunotomo 2011–, a serialized photo "Can be a Heroine" since March 2012

== Awards ==
- 15th Nikkan Sports Drama Grand Prix (Jul–Sept 2011): Best Actress for Ikemen desu ne
- 68th Television Drama Academy Awards: Special Award – Teppan
