= Fuka Koshiba =

Japanese actress (born 1997)

- 小芝 風花
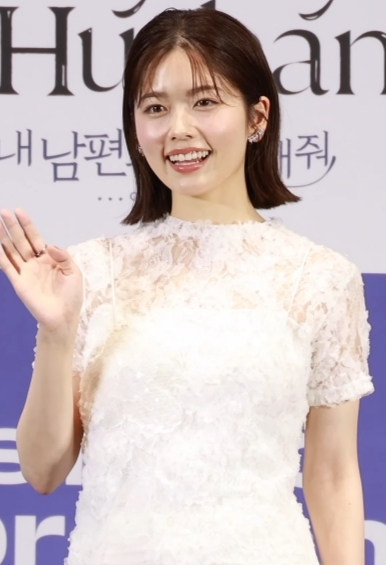
- Koshiba in 2025
- Born: April 16, 1997 (age 29); Osaka Prefecture, Japan
- Occupation: Actress
- Years active: 2012–present
- Agent: Top Coat
- Website: Official profile

Fuka Koshiba (小芝 風花, Koshiba Fūka; born April 16, 1997 in Osaka Prefecture, Japan) is a Japanese actress represented by the talent agency Top Coat.

== Life and career ==
Fuka Koshiba was born on April 16, 1997 in Sakai, Osaka, Japan. In an interview with Sports Nippon, she stated that her mother chose her given name after being inspired by Chiharu Matsuyama's song "Ōzora to Daichi no Naka de," combining the kanji characters for "wind" and "flower" to form "Fuka."

Koshiba began taking gymnastics lessons in her early elementary years before turning to figure skating in the third grade. She trained and competed for several years, reaching the Japan Skating Federation's Grade 7 proficiency level and placing eighth at a Western Japan sectional event. She was also selected for a national training camp for promising young skaters (全国有望新人発掘合宿) organized by the Japan Skating Federation. In addition to singles skating, she competed in ice dancing and won the novice division at the 15th All-Japan Figure Skating Novice Championships (第15回全日本フィギュアスケートノービス選手権大会).

Her interest in the entertainment industry began after seeing Olympic skater Mao Asada appear in a television commercial. Motivated by this, she auditioned for the 2011 Aeon × Oscar Promotion Girls Audition, performing a skating-inspired dance routine, and won the Grand Prix award. Although she initially intended to continue skating, she later decided to focus on acting after realizing that balancing both activities would be difficult.

In 2012, she debuted in the drama Iki mo Dekinai Natsu.

In 2014, Koshiba played her first leading role in Kiki's Delivery Service. She was awarded the Best Newcomer Award at the 57th Blue Ribbon Awards and 24th Japanese Movie Critics Awards for her acting in this film.

In 2023, Koshiba portrayed the character of Ranna Akamatsu in the cooking drama Fermat's Cuisine, starring Fumiya Takahashi and Jun Shison, and based on the manga series by Yūgo Kobayashi.

On December 27, 2024, she announced that she left Oscar Promotion at the end of the year, and transferred to Top Coat starting 2025.

On October 31, 2026, Koshiba appeared alongside Shigeru Miyamoto in a Nintendo Direct celebrating "Pikmin Day" on November 1. Miyamoto noticed her after seeing Pikmin hats she knitted on Instagram and brought her in to help bring awareness and "excitement" to the series going forward.

== Filmography ==
=== TV series ===
Year	Title	Role	Notes	Ref.
2012	Iki mo Dekinai Natsu	Mao Tanizaki		
2013	Skate Kutsu no Yakusoku: Nagoya Joshi Figure Monogatari	Yoko Mizumoto		
2014	Great Teacher Onizuka	Tsugumi Naruse		
2016	Here Comes Asa!	Chiyo Shirooka	Asadora	
2019	Tokusatsu GaGaGa	Kano Nakamura	Lead role	
2019	Pallarel Tokyo	Mika Kuraishi	Lead role	
2020	Gourmet Detective Goro Akechi	Ichigo Kobayashi		
2020–22	Yokai Housemate	Mio Meguro	Lead role; 2 seasons	
2021	Mocomi	Mokomi Shimizu	Lead role	
2022	Medium	Makoto Chiwasaki	Miniseries	
2022	Invert	Makoto Chiwasaki	Miniseries	
2023	Born to Be on Air!	Minare Koda	Lead role	
2023	Fermat's Cuisine	Ranna Akamatsu		
2024	Ōoku: The Palace	Isonomiya Tomoko	Lead role	
2025	Unbound	Hananoi	Taiga drama	
2025	The 19th Medical Chart	Takino		
2025	Marry My Husband	Misa Kanbe	Lead role	

=== Films ===
Year	Title	Role	Notes	Ref.
2014	Kiki's Delivery Service	Kiki	Lead role	
2015	Girls Step	Aimi Katase		
2017	Tenshi no Iru Toshokan	Sakura Yoshii	Lead role	
2018	Bunbuku Chagama	Kawashima		
2022	Yokai Housemate: Is He Prince Charming?	Mio Meguro	Lead role	
2022	Sadako DX	Ayaka Ichijō	Lead role	
2024	The Dancing Okami	Yuka Higuchi	Lead role	
2026	Chimney Town: Frozen in Time	Nagi (voice)		

=== Dubbing ===
Live-action

- The Nutcracker and the Four Realms as Clara Stahlbaum (Mackenzie Foy)
- Twisters as Kate Cooper (Daisy Edgar-Jones)

Animation

- The Lord of the Rings: The War of the Rohirrim as Héra

== Awards and nominations ==
Year	Award	Category	Work(s)	Result	Ref.
2015	57th Blue Ribbon Awards	Best Newcomer	Kiki's Delivery Service	Won	
2024	48th Elan d'or Awards	Newcomer of the Year	Herself	Won	
