= Sadako Yamamura =

Character in the Ring franchise

- Rie Inō as Sadako in Ring (1998)
- First appearance: Ring (1991)
- Last appearance: Sadako DX (2022)
- Created by: Koji Suzuki
- Based on: Sadako Takahashi
- Portrayed by: Rie Inō (Ring (1998 film), Ring 2); Hinako Saeki (Spiral (film)); Ayane Miura (Ring (1995 TV movie)); Tae Kimura (Ring: The Final Chapter, Spiral (TV)); Yukie Nakama (Ring 0: Birthday); Ai Hashimoto (Sadako 3D); Mizuki Endo (Sadako 3D 2); Elly Nanami (Sadako vs. Kayako); Ayaka Minami (Sadako); Naoko Mori (Fright Night: Ring); as Park Eun-suh: Bae Doona (The Ring Virus); as Samara Morgan: Daveigh Chase (The Ring); Kelly Stables (The Ring Two, Rings (2005)); Bonnie Morgan (The Ring Two, Rings (2017))

In-universe information
- Full name: Sadako Yamamura; Park Eun-suh; Samara Morgan
- Aliases: Masako (Spiral); Julia (Rings (2017))
- Species: Vengeful ghost; Quasi-oceanic demigod (formerly); Human (formerly)
- Gender: Female; Intersex (Novels/The Ring Virus)
- Occupation: Actress (formerly)
- Family: Novels: Shizuko Yamamura (mother) †; Heihachiro Ikuma (father) †; Takashi Yamamura (first cousin once removed); Unnamed younger brother †; Japanese films: Shizuko Yamamura (mother) †; Heihachiro Ikuma (adoptive father) †; Unknown sea demon (biological father); Takashi Yamamura (uncle) †; American films: Rachel Keller (surrogate mother); Anna Morgan (adoptive mother) †; Richard Morgan (adoptive father) †; Evelyn Borden (née Osorio) (biological mother) †; Galen Burke (biological father) †; Manga: Sadako-san and Sadako-chan
- Significant others: Ando Mitsuo (Spiral novel and film adaptation); Hiroshi Toyama (Birthday, Ring 0: Birthday)
- Nationality: Japanese

Sadako Yamamura (山村 貞子, Yamamura Sadako) is a fictional character and the main antagonist of Koji Suzuki's Ring novel series and its eponymous film series. Her backstory varies between continuities, but all depict her as the vengeful ghost of a young psychic who was murdered and thrown into a well. As a ghost, she is dressed in a simple white dress usually with long black hair hiding her face, and uses nensha, her most distinctive power, to create a cursed videotape; whoever watches the tape will be haunted by Sadako and die exactly one week later unless the tape is copied and shown to another person, who must then repeat the same process. The titular "ring" from the novels and films refers to a ring-like visual that appears on the cursed videotape, which depicts the top of the well as seen by Sadako from its bottom. Korean and American films reimagine the character as Park Eun-seo (Korean: 박은서) and Samara Morgan, respectively, with similar backgrounds and features.

Sadako has been played by several actresses in films, including Rie Inō, who premiered the role in Ring (1998) and Ring 2 (1999), Bae Doona in The Ring Virus (1999), and Daveigh Chase in the first American film (2002). Two film adaptations largely differ from her traditional depictions: Ring 0: Birthday (2000), in which she is portrayed by Yukie Nakama, follows the events leading to her death and features her as main protagonist rather than as an antagonist, while Sadako vs. Kayako (2016), in which is portrayed by Elly Nanami, is a crossover pitching her rivalry against Ju-On and The Grudge antagonist Kayako Saeki and briefly with Toshio Saeki.

Sadako and her American version, Samara, are both regarded as popular horror characters, notably spreading the appearance of ghosts with Yūrei-like looks of pale girls with long dark hair in popular culture.

== Appearances ==
=== In literature ===
==== Novels ====
Sadako was born in 1947 to Shizuko Yamamura and Dr. Heihachiro Ikuma in Oshima Island. The year before, Shizuko gained psychic powers after retrieving an ancient statuette of En no Ozuno from the ocean. Shizuko also gave birth to a baby boy, but he died four months later due to an illness. Planning to move to Tokyo with Ikuma, she entrusted her mother to take care of baby Sadako. At Ikuma's encouragement, Shizuko displayed her psychic powers during a publicized demonstration. However, Shizuko bowed out of the demonstration due to migraines brought on by her powers. The press denounced Shizuko as a fraud because of this. Depressed, Shizuko eventually returned to Oshima Island and committed suicide by jumping into Mount Mihara. Meanwhile, Ikuma attempted to unlock the psychic powers of his own by meditating beneath a waterfall, which ended up causing him to contract tuberculosis, requiring him to recuperate in a sanatorium in the Izu Peninsula, leaving Sadako to be raised by Shizuko's relatives. Like her mother, Sadako was a powerful psychic; whereas Shizuko could only burn images onto paper, Sadako could also project images into electronic media, such as TV.

At the age of nineteen, Sadako joins a Tokyo-based acting troupe. As revealed in the short story Lemon Heart, she falls in love with the sound operator, Hiroshi Toyama. He learns of her powers, but he accepts them. However, an early form of the curse is created in the form of a sound recording that kills four people, including the troupe's director, resulting in a heartbroken Sadako leaving Toyama. Eventually, Sadako visits Ikuma in the Izu sanatorium, only to be raped by a doctor named Jotaro Nagao, who is unknowingly infected with smallpox. During the assault, he discovers that Sadako has testicular feminization syndrome, and has the genitalia of both sexes. Sadako bites him on the shoulder, causing her to be infected with the smallpox virus that Nagao contracted. Finally, Nagao throws her down a nearby well and seals her within. Foreseeing herself being reborn years later, Sadako vows revenge on the world before she dies. Her psychic powers mutate the smallpox virus into a new strain of virus, called the "ring virus", one that causes anyone who contracts it to die, seemingly of fright, within a week.

By Ring, in 1991, the Izu sanatorium, including the well that Sadako was thrown into, was rebuilt into a mountain resort. The well is located right below a TV screen of one of the resort's cabins. When a vacationing family forgets to bring home their videotape after one night, Sadako projects the new virus onto the TV screen, taking the form of a video, and the VCR records it onto the tape. The next visitor at the cabin, 17-year-old Tomoko Oishi, inadvertently discovers and watches the tape, leading Sadako to kill her. Tomoko's uncle, journalist Kazuyuki Asakawa, begins investigating her death and watches the tape, leading to him being cursed by Sadako. He learns about Sadako's origin and writes a journal detailing his investigation.

As revealed in Spiral, the ring virus originally had an escape clause that allowed it to propagate itself, but Tomoko and her friends, not believing any of it, mischievously overwrote the part where the tape gave the solution as a prank. As a result, the virus had no means to inform its viewers on how to multiply itself, so it mutated when the next viewer of the tape, Kazuyuki, watched it and copied it for his friend, Ryuji Takayama. Two strains then emerged: a ring-shaped one, which would invariably kill its viewers within a week, and a spermatozoon-shaped one, which would lay dormant within the viewers unless they were ovulating women, whose ovum would be infected by the virus and transformed into a Sadako clone. This was because Sadako wanted to be reborn, something she could not biologically do because she was intersex. Finally, though the original tape and its copies had been disposed of by the events of Spiral, the virus found its way into a new medium: Kazuyuki's journal, which his brother published after he died in a car accident. Kazuyuki's survival was actually not because he copied the tape for Ryuji, but rather because he unwittingly helped the virus propagate. This was why Kazuyuki survived, while his wife and daughter, who also copied the tape per his instruction, did not.

The dormant virus infects the ovulating Mai Takano when she watches the tape, causing her to give birth to a Sadako clone who assumes the name Masako. She is described as a "complete hermaphrodite" as she has fully functional male and female reproductive organs. After her identity is revealed, Sadako tells Mitsuo Ando that she made a deal with Ryuji: in exchange for his resurrection, he would help her be reborn, something he did when he attracted Ando into the case. She then blackmails Ando: in exchange for not activating the dormant ring virus that he contracted when he read Kazuyuki's journal, he would refrain from stopping it from being published. As an incentive, Sadako, who can clone a person by implanting their genes into her, will bring his deceased son, Takanori, back to life. Realizing that Sadako would win no matter what he does, Ando reluctantly cooperates.

In the third novel, Loop, which revealed that the events of the previous two books were set in a virtual reality called LOOP, it is stated that the ring virus unwittingly escapes into the real world after its creators clone Ryuji, who is dying from the virus. The virus separates from Ryuji and mutates with a bacterium, creating a highly dangerous cancer called the Metastatic Human Cancer (MHC), which threatens all life. The cloned Ryuji, who is raised as Kaoru Futami and has no memories of his life in LOOP, eventually has to reenter the virtual reality to get the cure for both the ring virus and the MHC. In the short story "Happy Birthday", Kaoru finds a cure that neutralizes all clones in the virtual reality, causing both himself and the Sadako clones to rapidly age and die within a matter of years.

The fifth novel, S, reveals that Masako was impregnated by Ryuji and gave birth to a girl named Akane Maruyama. Akane, unlike the Sadako clones, does not inherit the defective genes that had imperiled the clones, including Masako, who dies a few years after she is born. Meanwhile, Ryuji tries to stop the ring virus from propagating through Kazuyuki's journal but relents to allow four Sadako clones to continue existing, thinking that they have short lives and therefore pose no threat. However, the clones are killed off one by one by Ryuji's student Hiroyuki Niimura, who feels he must destroy Sadako once and for all.

==== Manga ====
In Sadako-san and Sadako-chan, set after the 2019 film Sadako, Sadako seeks to move on from her tragic past and spread the curse via videotape by navigating the modern era of YouTube and social media with a young girl known as "Little Sadako", a reincarnation of herself. Little Sadako, a young child and fledging YouTuber who spends all day in a small closet at her mother's request, befriends Sadako when she arrives seven days after watching her tape and not being afraid of her, creating a joint YouTube channel with her dubbed "Twodako".

In the post-apocalyptic Sadako at the End of the World, Sadako is summoned after two young girls watch her videotape to find that an apocalypse has occurred since she was last summoned, and that the two girls are apparently the last humans alive. Conflicted over what to do when the girls' seven-day period is up, Sadako assists the pair in searching the world for more victims for her under the guise of friendship, as the trio's growing bond increases the possibility of Sadako herself finding peace and her curse being broken. Ultimately, after killing the last hairdresser on the planet after having their hair done and meeting with Okiku, Sadako reluctantly elects to take both girls' lives on the seventh day, ending her curse and reuniting with them in the afterlife.

=== In film ===
Sadako's past is portrayed differently in the film series. In this continuity, Sadako is not the biological child of Dr. Ikuma and Shizuko but is implied to be the result of sexual intercourse between Shizuko and an enigmatic sea demon after Shizuko spent hours staring at and talking to the ocean. In Ring 2 it is revealed that shortly after childbirth, Shizuko left baby Sadako in a cave called "The River of Offering" where people put their unwanted children to let the waves take the children away. When she was still there come morning, Shizuko instead took Sadako home. Shizuko's brother Takashi later learns of her psychic prediction of Mount Mihara's eruption and tells everyone about it, making her an instant celebrity. Dr. Ikuma, eager to prove the existence of ESP, encouraged her to participate in a demonstration at Tokyo. During the demonstration, Shizuko was successfully able to prove her psychic abilities, but a spiteful journalist, Miyaji, accused Shizuko of being a fraud, inciting other journalists to join in the slanderous uproar. Sadako, who watched from backstage, killed Miyaji in a rage.

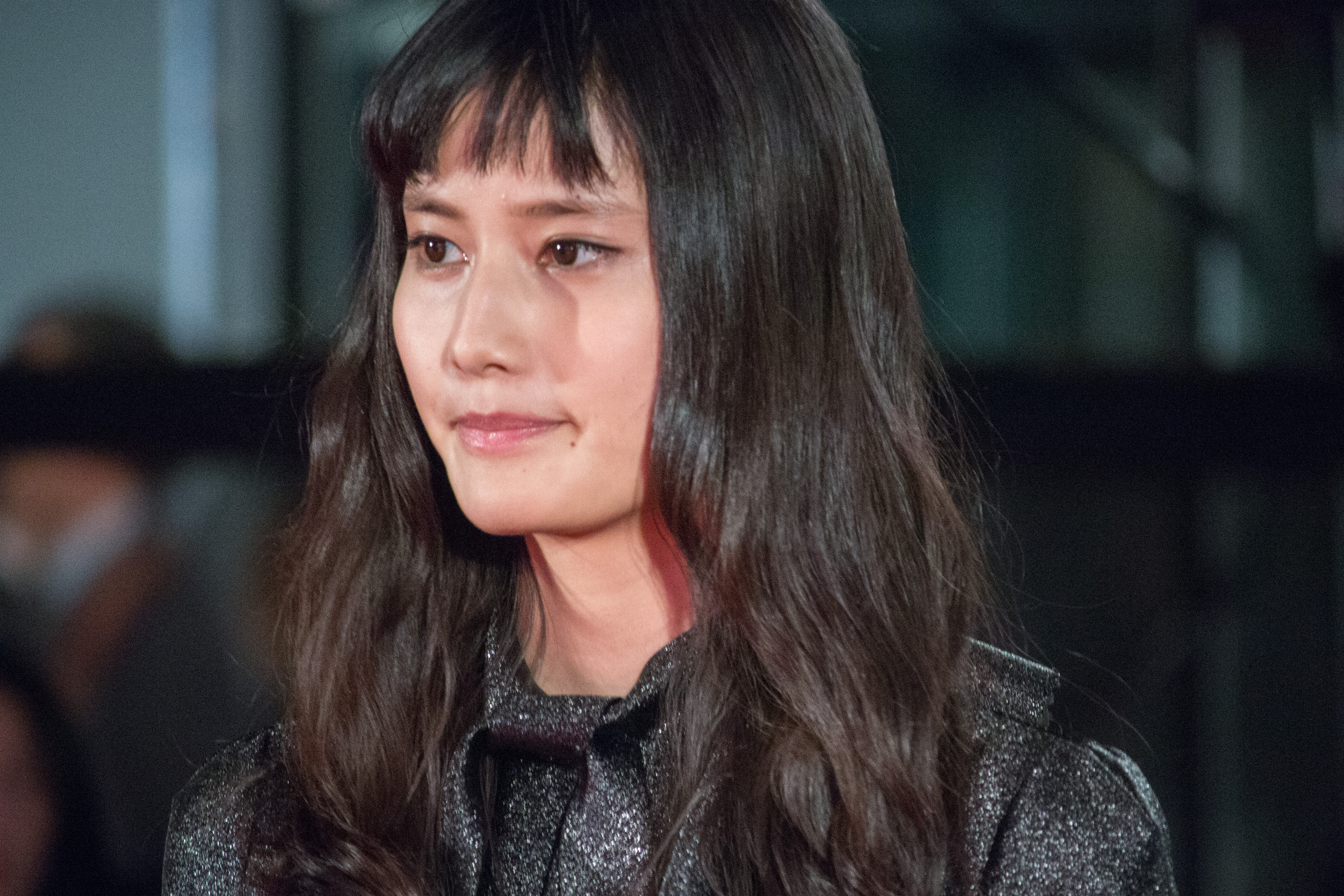
Ai Hashimoto (pictured in 2015) played Sadako in Sadako 3D (2012).

Sadako eventually split into identical twins, one good and innocent, and the other wrathful and destructive. After Shizuko committed suicide, Ikuma moved to Izu with the twins. The good Sadako grew into an adult and became an actress, while the evil twin was locked up by Ikuma and drugged to stunt her growth. Akiko Miyaji, the fiancée of the journalist whom Sadako killed, leads an angry mob to kill the evil Sadako, only for the twins to merge into one and slaughter her tormentors. Ikuma then wounded and threw Sadako down the well behind his house. Sadako survived for 30 years, dying shortly before the events of Ring, creating the cursed videotape.

At the end of Sadako 3D 2, it is revealed that Sadako has a daughter, who is briefly described as "the seed of despair, growing, and ready to bloom".

Sadako appears in the crossover film Sadako vs. Kayako, encountering Kayako Saeki, the antagonist of the Ju-On films. Sadako's cursed videotape, in this version, is reduced to a two-day deadline instead of the traditional seven days. She is also shown to be much stronger and more violent this time, forcing people who try to hinder her curse or escape to kill themselves in brutal ways. The two ghosts battle each other to kill two women who are under both of their respective curses, they are lured to an old well with the help of psychics Keizo Tokiwa and Tamao in an attempt to destroy them both. However, it ends up causing the two ghosts to fuse into a huge, monstrous entity called Sadakaya. Furthermore, prior to the battle and subsequent fusion, Sadako's curse is inadvertently transferred from the cursed videotape to the Internet, potentially unleashing it upon the entire world.

=== In video games ===
Sadako appeared as a playable character alongside Yoichi Asakawa in the asymmetrical horror game Dead by Daylight starting on March 8, 2022.

== Design ==
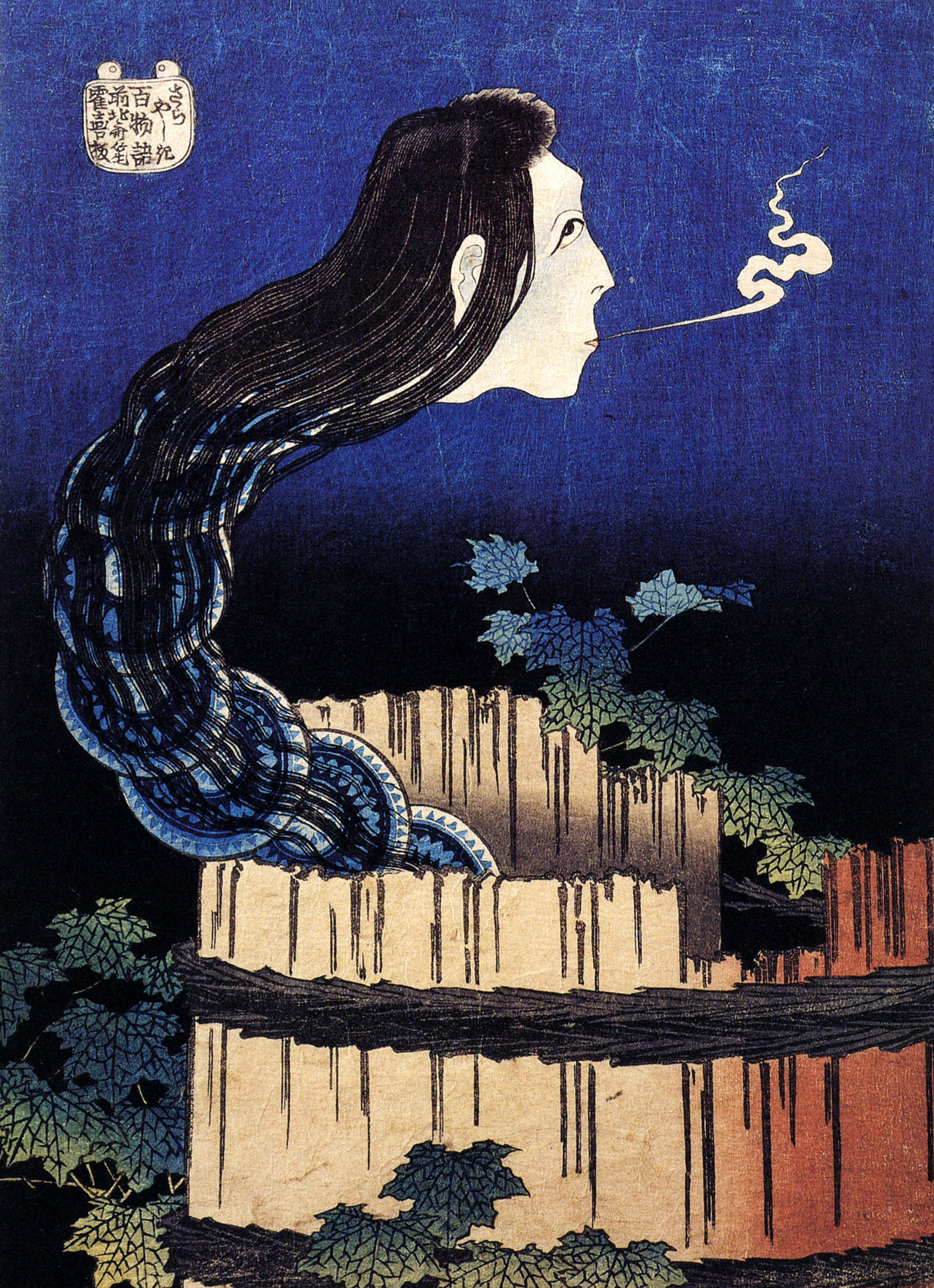
Sadako's backstory is heavily inspired by the Japanese legend of Okiku.

Sadako appears as a young woman whose face is hidden under her long black hair, and she wears a white dress that has water stains on it, which is also frayed at the end. This appearance is typical of yūrei. Specifically, Sadako is a type of yūrei known as an onryō, bound by a desire for vengeance. In Sadako 3D, Sadako appears as her human self while still displaying traits of an onryō, in addition to the standard yūrei appearance. Ring: Kanzenban was the only rendition that differed from a traditional yūrei appearance. She is shown similarly as a young woman, yet her hair barely covers her face, and is frequently portrayed nude, as opposed to a white garment. Sadako is also an amalgamation of two famous Japanese ghosts, Oiwa and Okiku. From Oiwa, Sadako takes the single, misshapen eye. From Okiku, the style of murder is, being thrown down a well and then having the ghost rise from the well to seek vengeance.

The success of the 1998 film Ring brought the image of the yūrei to Western popular culture for the first time, although the image has existed in Japan for centuries. This image is often used in J-Horror films, such as Ju-on (and its remake The Grudge), One Missed Call and Dark Water.

In the original Japanese film, Sadako's face is never seen aside from her one-eyed glare, employing the fear of the unknown. In Ringu 2, her skull is sculpted over with forensic clay in an attempt to reproduce her face. The Western remakes show Samara Morgan's face clearly.

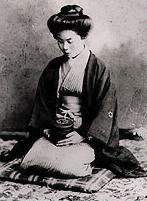
Chizuko Mifune, a famous psychic in the early 20th century, is an inspiration for Sadako and her mother, Shizuko.

Sadako is also based on the life of early-20th century psychic Sadako Takahashi, an apparent practitioner of nensha, the art of projecting images onto film by thought alone. In 1931, Takahashi was studied by psychologist Tomokichi Fukurai for his book, Clairvoyance and Thoughtography. Fukurai also worked with psychic Chizuko Mifune, who inspired the backstory of Sadako and her mother Shizuko.

== Powers ==
Sadako has a variety of psychic powers throughout all the Ring cycle books and films. The most famous is her ability to create the "cursed" videotape.

=== Videotape ===
In the films her method of killing with the video curse is not explained, but when someone is killed by it she is seen climbing out of a nearby surface, often a television screen, and approaching them. The corpses are discovered with looks of unearthly anguish on their faces.

In Spiral, the curse is explained in detail and is discovered to be a virus. When someone watches the cursed tape (or something else carrying the curse) some of their DNA is changed to become that of the Ring Virus (a hybrid of Sadako's DNA and that of the smallpox virus). This travels throughout their body and in most cases causes a sarcoma to form on one of the arteries of their heart. If the curse has not been appeased within seven days, the sarcoma detaches from the artery and clogs it, causing heart failure. Eventually, however, the virus is able to infect people through means other than videotapes, such as a report detailing the events of Ring written by Kazuyuki Asakawa in which the virus had entered from Asakawa's body, a novel version of the report was published by Asakawa's brother, a movie based on the novel (which Sadako was cast as herself in), and finally the Metastatic Human Cancer virus that appears in the third novel, Loop.

Each version of the videotape contains disturbing imagery. The novel version features messages at the start and end of the tape, though the method to removing the curse was recorded over. Most of the footage is from Sadako's perspective, including being sexually assaulted by Nagao Jotaro. The films' incarnation has more abstract imagery, and features an enigmatic figure whose face is obscured by a towel, pointing out to something off-screen. He is collectively referred to as the "Towel Man", and is speculated to symbolize Sadako's unknown, possibly otherworldly biological father. He appears in Ring, directing Reiko to Yoichi watching the tape, and later points out the copy she made of the tape, implying he may actually be Ryuji Takayama following his death. The final shot of the tape is of the well, which extends with each viewing, until the deadline of the curse where Sadako emerges from the well and then crawls out of the nearest reflective surface to kill her victim.

An alternate version of the tape was featured in Ring: The Final Chapter, portrayed as being recorded during pop singer Nao Matsuzaki's music video, and the deadline for the curse was extended to thirteen days. The American film incarnation mostly consists of abstract imagery or exaggerated visions that Samara Morgan has seen, but still adapts a lot from the Japanese version including the infamous final sequence where Samara emerges from television to kill her victims.

== Other versions ==
=== Park Eun-Suh ===
Sadako was the source for the character Park Eun-Suh in Korean remake film The Ring Virus (1999), portrayed by Korean actress Bae Doona.

Park Eun-Suh more closely resembles the Sadako from the novels. She appears to be about the same age as Sadako, though her age is never confirmed; she is only said to have disappeared after high school. She and her mother both had supernatural powers (similar to Sadako and Shizuko) and were rumored to be witches. After Eun-Suh's mother throws herself off a cliff into the sea, Eun-Suh's powers mysteriously disappear. As she grows older, she works at a nightclub under the name "Sunny Park". Her powers return. She is able to turn on an unplugged TV. After an incident in which she psychically murders a coworker who watched her showering, Eun-Suh mysteriously leaves the nightclub and her whereabouts become unknown to the staff. It is heavily implied that she killed him to hide the truth of her testicular feminization syndrome.

Eun-Suh is visiting her half-brother at a sanitarium when she is raped by him. During this encounter, he discovers that she is a hermaphrodite. She is ashamed and telepathically threatens him. Horrified, he chokes her unconscious and drops her in a nearby well.

=== Samara Morgan ===
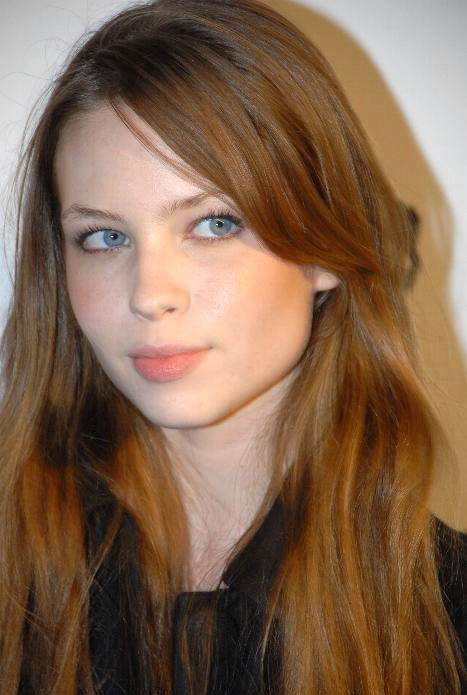
Daveigh Chase played Samara Morgan in The Ring (2002).

Sadako was the main influence on Samara Morgan from the 2002 American remake, The Ring and its sequels, The Ring Two and Rings (2017). She was played by Daveigh Chase, Kelly Stables and Bonnie Morgan, respectively. Samara Morgan is depicted as an otherworldly little girl, responsible for the creation of the cursed videotape from the American version of the Ring story. Her usual appearance is of a girl with long, dark hair covering her face and wearing a white dress. Samara possesses the power of nensha like Sadako, capable of burning images onto surfaces and into the minds of others. Unlike Sadako, Samara psychically disfigures her victims' faces before they finally die of a heart attack.

Samara's history is covered through the American films. The Ring states that Anna and Richard Morgan (Shannon Cochran and Brian Cox), who own a horse ranch on Moesko Island, Washington, claimed to have adopted Samara from unknown parents on the mainland after numerous unsuccessful attempts to have a child on their own. As Samara grows older, her powers burn horrible images into Anna's mind, nearly driving her insane. Richard banishes Samara to live in the ranch's barn, but she uses her powers to drive Anna's beloved horses to suicide after they "kept her up at night". At some point, Samara is taken to a psychiatric hospital but the doctors are unable to explain her powers. During a family vacation on Shelter Mountain, Anna attacks Samara as she stands before an old well, suffocating her with a garbage bag and then dropping her down the well. Anna then commits suicide by jumping off a cliff. However, Samara clings to life for seven days alone in the well before dying from a combination of starvation and hypothermia. Eventually, a set of rental cabins are built near the well, one on top of it. This allows Samara to project her visions into a VCR tape, creating the seven-day curse. Samara's curse kills Katie (Amber Tamblyn), the niece of journalist Rachel Keller (Naomi Watts), who investigates the tape's origins. Rachel, her ex-boyfriend Noah Clay (Martin Henderson) and their son Aidan (David Dorfman) all watch the video. Rachel meets Richard, who warns her to stay away and then kills himself via electrocution. Rachel and Noah eventually find Samara's corpse in the well and bury it. This however does nothing to appease Samara as hoped by Rachel and Noah and she kills Noah as per the rules of the curse. Rachel destroys the original videocassette in a fit of rage but uses a copied version of the video to continue the curse in order to save Aidan.

The Ring Two expands upon Samara's backstory: her mother, a woman named Evelyn (portrayed by Mary Elizabeth Winstead in her youth and by Sissy Spacek as an older woman), believed that her daughter had a demon inside her and tried to drown the girl, but she was prevented by nuns. Evelyn is sent to an insane asylum, while Samara was put up for adoption. In the film's present timeline, Samara deliberately manipulates the tape to get back to Rachel, having decided to make Rachel her new mother. After Rachel burns the tape, Samara possesses Aidan. Rachel drugs Samara and then nearly drowns Aidan to exorcise her. Samara retreats into a television set, and Rachel allows herself to be pulled into Samara's visionary world and down the well. Rachel climbs out of the well with Samara pursuing her, but she covers the seal on the well just in time.

In Rings (2017), served as an alternative sequel to the 2002 film, ignoring the events of The Ring Two. Instead, the film focuses on a new backstory of Evelyn. Evelyn (Kayli Carter) was kidnapped by a local priest, Galen Burke (Vincent D'Onofrio), who raped and impregnated her, which led to Samara's conception during Evelyn's captivity. Years after his daughter's death, Burke sealed Samara's remains in a wall of his house at some point after the events of the first film, knowing her spirit would still plague those who have encountered her. He also blinded himself so Samara could not kill him. Samara has been looking for a compassionate host in order to be reborn, which she finds in a teenage girl named Julia (Matilda Lutz). Burke tries to kill Julia, but Samara rises out of Julia's iPhone, restores Burke's sight, and kills him. After the cremation of her remains, Samara's spirit now resides in Julia. In the film's closing scenes, Samara's video begins spreading online and goes viral.

== Reception ==
The characters of Sadako Yamamura and Samara Morgan have been well received by audiences and film critics alike. The Movie Book describes Sadako as influencing the whole Japanese horror genre, making the mythological image of the yurei popular in film. British film critic Mark Kermode lists Sadako's iconic crawl out of a television set as his seventh scariest moment from the horror film genre. The scene also came sixth in Channel 4's 100 Greatest Scary Moments. On 10 August 2002, Sadako was given a public funeral at the Laforet Museum in Harajuku, Tokyo, to tie-in with the opening of a Ring exhibit at the museum and the release of The Ring, with Koji Suzuki attending the funeral. Empire's Mark Dinning described Samara as one of the film industry's most "unrelenting, unreasonable, plain uncontrollable baddies ever". Daveigh Chase has been praised for her performance as Samara Morgan, and won the MTV Movie Award for Best Villain at the 2003 ceremony.
