= The Ring Volume 0: Birthday =

Japanese manga

- Genre: Horror
- Manga
- Written by: Hiroshi Takahashi
- Illustrated by: Meimu
- Published by: Kadokawa Shoten
- English publisher: US: Dark Horse Manga
- Published: 2000
- Volumes: 1

The Ring Volume 0: Birthday (リング0 バースデイ) is the 5th installment of The Ring manga series, based on the Japanese film of the same name. The antagonist of previous films & manga, Sadako Yamamura, is now the protagonist; the manga explores the origin of the cursed video, her early life, and the development of her powers. Both the film and manga are loosely based on the Ring novel series by Koji Suzuki.

== Introduction ==
The events in The Ring Volume 0: Birthday take place 30 years prior to the events in previous manga installments and films. The manga opens in Tokyo with two women having a conversation over their phones about a dream related to a video. In the dream the woman having a conversation is seen exploring the premise of an abandoned house. As she explores the house further she finds a well and an opening in the house, she goes through the opening and up a pair of stairs. Next follows a scene where a woman is knocked into the well, this foreshadows the end of the book where Sadako is pushed into the well by her father.

== Synopsis ==
Journalist Miyaji Akiko begins conducting an investigation on the girl known as Sadako, believing she is responsible for her fiancé's death. Sadako works at a Tokyo theatre troupe and is considered an outcast. During rehearsals, the lead actress Aiko is mysteriously struck down dead. Despite the troupe's disapproval, the director Shigemori bequeaths the lead role to Sadako. Toyama, the sound man, is the sole member of the troupe who supports Sadako. During another rehearsal session, Toyama hears strange noises coming from the sound tapes. He and Etsuko, a troupe member with a crush on him, find that the sound appears at the part in rehearsals during which Aiko died. Also, Aiko's voice can be heard on the tape. Meanwhile, Shigemori shows up at Sadako's apartment, promising to help her become a famous actress.

At the theatre, Etsuko discovers Sadako's costume is missing. She and Toyama find Sadako backstage, in a dreamlike state, clutching the dress. Etsuko takes the dress and leaves, enraged. Sadako tells Toyama that she feels that someone is always following her. She collapses and wakes at Toyama's house. However, she has another bloody vision and runs off. Miyaji turns up at the theatre, asking to see Sadako. While she is taking photographs, the camera shatters. Miyaji receives a visit from Sadako's childhood teacher, who claims that she witnessed strange and horrifying things in the Yamamura Inn in Sadako's hometown. She also reports claims of a second Sadako.

The night before the play's premiere, Shigemori confronts Sadako and accuses her of killing the reporters at her mother Shizuko's public psychic experiment. He attacks her, only to be attacked and accidentally killed by Toyama. The two hide the body, and Toyama is taken to the hospital. There, Sadako reveals her healing abilities.

That night, at the play's premiere, Sadako and Toyama confess their love for each other. Etsuko and Miyaji cooperate to get their revenge on Sadako: Miyaji for her fiancé's death, and Etsuko for stealing Toyama. During the play, Etsuko plays a recording of Shizuko's experiment, freezing Sadako. Shizuko's ghost appears, and Sadako's doctor climbs onstage to help her. Sadako sees him as Shigemori and psychically sets him alight. Backstage, the other troupe members have found Shigemori's corpse, and chase Sadako into a dressing room, where they brutally club her to death. Miyaji deduces that she and the troupe have been cursed by their contact with Sadako and the curse will be only lifted by killing the second Sadako as well.

With Sadako's body in a truck, they drive to the house of Dr. Ikuma Heihachiro, Sadako's foster father. Seemingly expecting them, he leads them to the second Sadako's bedroom. She has, however, escaped. Back in the truck, Sadako revives thanks to her proximity to her other self. Together with Toyama, she escapes to a nearby clifftop. The two Sadakos merge and kill Toyama, then the rest of the troupe. Miyaji and Etsuko hide out in a nearby hut. When Sadako discovers them, Miyaji shoots Etsuko and herself, rather than face the death that Sadako brings.

Dr. Heihachiro finds Sadako sometime later, having calmed down. He takes her to the house and gives her an injection, claiming it will calm her, but the substance that he gave her was poison. He intends to kill her himself. Sadako attempts to run but struggles with movement. She makes it as far as the well in Heihachiro's yard. Heihachiro savagely slashes at her with a knife, and drops her in the well, sealing her away forever. Down in the well, Sadako wakes and screams, realizing her fate. Sometime later, the lines that Sadako rehearsed in the play run through her head as she mentally creates the cursed video.
