= Bunshinsaba (2012 film) =

- Film poster
- Directed by: Ahn Byeong-ki
- Screenplay by: Liu Han; Li Han; Li Wei
- Produced by: Pei Lin
- Starring: Mei Ting; Ma Shuliang; Wu Chao; Zhu Jiangdi; Guo Jingfei; Gao Xinyu
- Cinematography: Choi Sang-muk
- Edited by: Hahm Sung-won
- Music by: Jeong Yong-jin
- Production company: China Film Group Corporation
- Release date: 16 July 2012 (China)
- Running time: 92 minutes
- Country: China
- Language: Mandarin
- Box office: US$9.93 million

Bunshinsaba (simplified Chinese: 笔仙; traditional Chinese: 筆仙; pinyin: Bǐxiān) is a 2012 Chinese horror film directed by Ahn Byeong-ki." The film is set in Beijing, where Xiao Ai (Mei Ting) has her horror novel rejected by her patient publisher and finds out that her ex-husband, Qi Kun (Wu Chao), has been released from prison and is looking for her as well as her asthmatic son Xiao Xin (Zhu Jiangdi). Xiao Ai and Xiao Xin are offered an old house by her doctor where unexplainable events begin to happen.

The film was followed up by three sequels and four crossover films with Japanese horror franchises.

== Plot ==
A struggling novelist, Xiao Ai, has her horror novel rejected by her publisher. When her publisher notifies her that her husband, Qi Kun, who was imprisoned on charge of domestic abuse, has been released from prison, Xiao Ai decides to pack things up and move alongside her asthmatic son, Xiao Xin to a remote mansion owned by her friend and Xiao Xin's doctor, Yinan. Xiao Ai finds several cut-out photos of a girl and her mother inside a wardrobe, while Xiao Xin discovers a rag doll outside the mansion and takes an instant liking to it. Xiao Ai feels that ever since her son took the doll, the girl who is presumably the owner of the doll terrorizes her and makes Xiao Xin act unnatural, though he claims that the girl is afraid of her abusive mother. During one of her attempts to write a draft, Xiao Ai finds that a story has been written in her laptop, seemingly by no one, and which updates itself every day. The story matches the tale told by Xiao Xin: a girl who was abused by her mother after her father left them.

Despite repeated attempts to dispose of the doll, it always materializes back and returns to Xiao Xin's possession. The hauntings grow increasingly violent and malevolent, with Xiao Ai becoming even more paranoid and worried because of Xiao Xin's claims about the girl and her mother, until one day, Xiao Xin goes missing. Yinan calls the authorities to search for Xiao Xin. Xiao Ai also learns that the previous occupants of the mansion were a girl and her mother as per the story, and that the mother killed her daughter and herself when she could not take the pains of her husband leaving her. However, a rumor goes that the girl escaped the incident alive and was brought up in an orphanage. During the search, Qi Kun manages to reach the mansion and demands that Xiao Ai tells him the whereabouts of their son until Yinan stops him. Qi Kun informs Yinan that he had researched of Xiao Ai's background and learned that she was raised in an orphanage while being diagnosed with amnesia and asthma. Xiao Ai, meanwhile, sustains a head injury and is taken to the hospital by Yinan and Qi Kun, but along the way the car crashes off. Xiao Ai heads back to the mansion immediately.

At the mansion, Xiao Ai stumbles upon Qi Kun's research documents. It is revealed that the girl who haunts Xiao Ai is, in fact, Xiao Ai herself (albeit a younger version) and that Xiao Ai, deranged because of her own mother's abuses when she was young, is really the one who had abused Xiao Xin, but her bouts of amnesia meant that the only suspect of the abuses was Qi Kun, even though he only wanted to protect his son. She had also unknowingly wrote the story in her laptop, again because of her amnesia. Xiao Ai is led by her younger self to a secret room behind the wardrobe, where her mother hanged herself years before. She agrees to her younger self's demands to stay at the mansion in exchange for revealing where Xiao Xin is. After saving him, she attempts to escape the mansion but is almost strangled by her mother's spirit until she calls her "mother" for the first time since she never did it before, after which the spirit disappears.

Several months later, Xiao Ai has moved to the mansion permanently. She gives a monologue that her mother and son had taught her to understand her family, which led to her mother forgiving herself. A younger Xiao Ai is seen walking to the wardrobe where she is forcibly taken by her mother inside.

== Cast ==
- Mei Ting as Xiao Ai
- Ma Shuliang
- Wu Chao as Qi Kun
- Zhu Jiangdi as Xiao Xin
- Guo Jingfei as Yinan
- Gao Xinyu

== Style ==
Derek Elley of Film Business Asia commented that, outside the fact that the characters were speaking Mandarin, the film "looks exactly like a South Korean one — from its clean-looking shooting style, photography, editing, music and even immaculate wardrobe — and with its remote setting could just as well have been shot in South Korea as well." The Chinese title of the film translates to a type of ouija board game using a pen, but no such item appears in the film.

== Release ==
Bunshinsaba was released in China on July 12, 2012. The film grossed RMB32.0 million (US$5.01 million) in the first seven days of its theatrical run. Since the film's release, director Ahn Byeong-ki has become the first South Korean director to set up his own workshop (ByungKi An China Studio) in mainland China. The film ended its theatrical run grossing RMB61 million (US$9.93 million). The film was followed up an eight-film franchise, starting with a sequel Bunshinsaba 2 in 2013 and Bunshinsaba 3 in 2014.

== Sequels ==
- Bunshinsaba 2 (2013)
- Bunshinsaba 3 (2014)
- Bloody House (2016) aka Bunshinsaba: Then a Shadow

== Crossovers ==
- Bunshinsaba vs Sadako (2016), featuring characters from The Ring
- Bunshinsaba vs Sadako 2 (2017), featuring characters from The Ring
- Sadako Wars: Bixian vs Kayako (2017), featuring characters from Ju-On
- Bunshinsaba: Hoichi the Earless (2021), formerly known as Bunshinsaba vs Sadako 3, features Kuman thong in addition to the ghost from The Ring and Ju-On

== See also ==
- Bunshinsaba (2004)
