= Tsutomu Hanabusa =

Japanese film director

- Born: 1968 (age 57–58); Kyoto, Kyoto Prefecture, Japan
- Occupation: Film director

Tsutomu Hanabusa (英 勉, Hanabusa Tsutomu) is a Japanese film director.

== Filmography ==
Year	Film	Credited as		Distributors	Ref.
Year	Film	Director	Writer	Distributors	Ref.
2008	The Handsome Suit	Yes	No	Asmik Ace	
2011	High School Debut	Yes	No	Asmik Ace	
2011	Go! Boys' School Drama Club	Yes	No	HDYMP Showgate	
2012	Sadako 3D	Yes	Yes	PKDN Films, Lionsgate Films	
2013	Sadako 3D 2	Yes	No	PKDN Films, Lionsgate Films	
2015	No Longer Heroine	Yes	No	Warner Bros.	
2015	No Longer Heroine	Yes	No	Warner Bros.	
2015	Osomatsu-kun	Yes	No	HDYMP Showgate	
2017	Asahinagu	Yes	Yes	Toho, NBCUniversal Entertainment Japan	
2017	Miseinen Dakedo Kodomo Janai	Yes	No	Toho	
2018	Real Girl	Yes	Yes	Warner Bros.	
2019	Kakegurui – Compulsive Gambler	Yes	Yes	GAGA Corp.	
2020	Keep Your Hands Off Eizouken!	Yes	No	Toho, NBCUniversal Entertainment Japan	
2020	Project Dream: How to Build Mazinger Z's Hangar	Yes	No	Bandai Namco Arts, Tokyo Theatres, Sony Pictures (Columbia Pictures)	
2020	Grand Blue	Yes	No	CJ Constantin Film, Warner Bros.	
2020	Humanoid Monster Bela	Yes	No	DLE	
2021	Kakegurui 2: Ultimate Russian Roulette	Yes	Yes	GAGA Corp.	
2021	Tokyo Revengers	Yes	No	Warner Bros.	
2023	Tokyo Revengers 2: Bloody Halloween Part 1	Yes	No	Warner Bros.	
2023	Tokyo Revengers 2: Bloody Halloween Part 2	Yes	No	Warner Bros.	
2025	Suicide Notes Laid on the Table	Yes	No	Shochiku	
2025	Romantic Killer	Yes	No	Toho	
