= Itsumi Osawa =

Japanese actress, author, and singer (born 1966)

Itsumi Osawa 大沢逸美
- Born: March 23, 1966 (age 60); Sapporo, Hokkaidō, Japan
- Occupations: Actress, author, singer

Itsumi Osawa (Japanese: 大沢逸美, Hepburn: Ōsawa Itsumi; born March 23, 1966 in Hokkaidō, Japan) is a Japanese actress, author, and singer.

== Biography ==
Osawa was born in Hokkaidō, Japan. Her career began as a singer after she won the Grand Prix at the 7th HoriPro Talent Scout Caravan, a contest that searches for the next big talent in Japan. She released her first single "Jēmuzu Dīn mitai na onna no ko" (ジェームス・ディーンみたいな女の子, "A Girl like James Dean") in 1983. In the same year, her father died. Her mother was also in poor health and became her mother's primary caretaker until her death. Her novel Okāsan, gomenne (お母さん、ごめんね, Mom, I'm Sorry) details her experiences with her mother and Japan's healthcare system. She has also given lectures on the subject.

== Selected filmography ==
=== Television ===
- Aoi hitomi no seiraifu (1984)
- Janpuappu! Seishun (1986)
- Jû yon sai no haha (2006)
- Uruwashiki oni (2007)
- Mr. Brain (2009)
- Kamen Rider W (2010)

=== Film ===
- Jorôgumo (1995)
- Lustful Revenge (1996)
- School Days with a Pig (2008)
- Gakudori (2011)

== Bibliography ==
- Okāsan gomenne (Mom, I'm sorry, 2003)
- Serafimu no yoru

== Awards ==
- 8th Nippon Television Music Festival, Newcomer Award
- 14th Japan Music Awards, Newcomer Award
- 25th Japan Record Awards, Newcomer Award
- 16th Shinjuku Music Festival, Silver Award
- 10th FNS Music Festival, Rookie Award
