= Sadako 3D 2 =

- Japanese theatrical release poster
- Directed by: Tsutomu Hanabusa
- Screenplay by: Daisuke Hosaka; Noriaki Sugihara
- Based on: Tide by Koji Suzuki
- Produced by: Tsuyoshi Kobayashi; Reiko Imayasu; Mitsuru Sato; Satoshi Takei
- Starring: Miori Takimoto; Kōji Seto; Itsumi Osawa; Kokoro Hirasawa; Takeshi Onishi; Yusuke Yamamoto; Ryosei Tayama; Satomi Ishihara
- Cinematography: Nobushige Fujimoto
- Edited by: Tsutomu Miyazaki
- Music by: Kenji Kawai
- Production companies: Kadokawa Shoten; Tohokushinsha Film
- Distributed by: Kadokawa Shoten
- Release date: August 30, 2013 (Japan)
- Running time: 96 minutes
- Country: Japan
- Language: Japanese
- Box office: $8.4 million

Sadako 3D 2 (Japanese: 貞子3D2) is a 2013 Japanese supernatural horror film directed by Tsutomu Hanabusa and the sequel to 2012's Sadako 3D. It is the final installment in the Spiral timeline.

== Plot ==
Takanori Andō (Kōji Seto) is waiting while Akane Ayukawa is giving birth to their daughter. Seiji Kashiwada's landlord sitting in a garden reads Kashiwada's letters and mutters that the girl is born. Another woman is accessing her laptop in her room when her husband calls her; she is suddenly possessed by a force from her laptop that forces her to commit suicide by stabbing her eye with a knife.

Five years after the events of the previous film, Takanori and Akane's daughter, Nagi (Kokoro Hirasawa) is cared for by Takanori's younger sister, Fuko (Miori Takimoto); Takanori himself is now working at Asakawa General Hospital since Akane's death by childbirth, distancing himself from Fuko and Nagi as he blames Nagi for Akane's death.

Fuko is certain that something is wrong with Nagi, as she distances herself from her friends, likes to draw strange imagery, and is always present near people who commit suicide. She consults with her psychiatrist, Dr. Fumika Kamimura (Itsumi Osawa), but she only states that Fuko's anxiety comes from the fact that she has not moved from her mother's suicide years ago, whose death she could not prevent. While playing at a park, one of Nagi's friends, Yuna, teases her about Akane's death. Moments later, she is found dead in the nearby river. Fuko becomes even more anxious as more deaths start to occur, from Nagi's babysitter to a train full of people, which Nagi had foreshadowed in the drawings she drew during her psychological test with Dr. Kamimura. She also says that Dr. Kamimura, as well as everyone else, will die.

Detective Mitsugi Kakiuchi (Takeshi Onishi) is assigned to investigate the case. He questions Detective Yugo Koiso (Ryosei Tayama), who is disabled following his own investigations of a similar case five years before. Koiso tells Kakiuchi that the suicides are linked to Sadako Yamamura, who almost possessed Akane as her vessel so she might be reborn in the world. Seconds later, a force pushes Koiso's wheelchair through a set of stairs to his death.

Kakiuchi finds the security camera recording before the train accident and spots Nagi looking at the camera. He tries to question Takanori about Nagi and Akane, but he refuses to disclose anything other than Akane's death. As he hurries up ahead, he accidentally drops his trash bags, revealing bundles of black hair. While Fuko is cleaning Takanori's room, she finds a locked-up wardrobe that contains a photo of Takanori, Akane, and baby Nagi, as well as several letters for Takanori from Seiji Kashiwada asking about Nagi's well-being.

Fuko visits Kashiwada (Yusuke Yamamoto), the latter awaiting his execution for his murder of young women five years before. Describing himself as Nagi's "fan", Kashiwada reveals that Nagi is not Akane's child, but Sadako's and that the only way to stop Nagi is for Fuko to kill herself or to kill Nagi. On the way home, Fuko receives a call from Dr. Kamimura asking her to meet her but finds that she has been possessed, and while escaping from her attack, Fuko relives her experiences of seeing her mother's suicide and becomes cursed.

At home, Fuko experiences nightmares of Nagi and Takanori attacking her. She contemplates killing Nagi by throwing her into the sea but decides not to. She meets Takanori and, after urging him to help Nagi, he shows Fuko that Akane (Satomi Ishihara) is still alive, albeit in a comatose state. He tells Fuko that since Sadako attempted to be reborn through Akane in the first film, Akane has allowed herself to be possessed by Sadako so she can fight her from the inside. Eventually, Akane became pregnant and delivered Nagi, but she could never reunite with her mother again lest Sadako be reborn. Takanori also reveals that Nagi is not responsible for the deaths.

The next day, Fuko discovers Nagi is missing, while Takanori finds her roaming in the Asakawa Hospital. He is attacked and brutally beaten by Kakiuchi, who wants to kill Nagi and Akane to stop the curse, revealing that his wife (the woman killed in the beginning) had died from the curse and he himself is also cursed. Nagi escapes and reunites with Fuko, who allows Nagi to reunite with her mother. However, Akane is shot before she can reach Nagi by Kakiuchi, who promptly commits suicide. As the whole room is flooded by blood pouring from Sadako's well, Nagi is taken by Sadako, but Fuko manages to save her.

Several days later, Fuko and Nagi have a picnic at a meadow, while Kashiwada's landlord, still sitting in the garden, reads Kashiwada's last letter before his execution. The film ends with the camera recording that Kakiuchi watches, which reveals that Sadako's child is not Nagi.

== Cast ==
- Miori Takimoto as Fuko Ando, a young woman who takes care of her niece, Nagi, following her brother's abandonment.
- Kōji Seto as Takanori Ando, Fuko's older brother who blames his daughter, Nagi, for his lover's death.
- Itsumi Osawa as Fumika Kamimura, Fuko's psychiatrist.
- Kokoro Hirasawa as Nagi Ando, Takanori and Akane's quiet daughter who is suspected of hosting Sadako's powers.
- Takeshi Onishi as Mitsugi Kakiuchi, a detective whose wife's death results in him taking Sadako's case.
- Yusuke Yamamoto as Seiji Kashiwada, an online artist working for Sadako. He is currently awaiting execution.
- Ryosei Tayama as Yugo Koiso, a now-disabled detective who previously investigated Sadako's case in the previous film.
- Satomi Ishihara as Akane Ayukawa, Takanori's lover and Nagi's mother, who has been hosting Sadako since the end of the previous film.

== Production ==
Following the success of Sadako 3D, Tsutomu Hanabusa returned to direct a sequel, Sadako 3D 2. Daisuke Hosaka and Noriaki Sugihara wrote the screenplay, with Koji Suzuki credited for the original story. Shooting began around early March 2013.

The film introduced a system marketed as “Smart 4D”, in which audience members downloaded a free app and kept their phones switched on during the movie. The app worked with the film to trigger additional scares throughout the film.

The film's theme song, "SCREAM", was performed by South Korean pop duo TVXQ, known in Japan as Tohoshinki. The song was released as a Japanese single on September 4, 2013, five days after the film's Japanese theatrical release. Producer Tsuyoshi Kobayashi explained that the group was selected in hopes of combining the pop duo's popularity across Asia with that of the Ring franchise.

== Release ==
Sadako 3D 2 was released theatrically in Japan on August 30, 2013, distributed by Kadokawa. The film subsequently received theatrical releases in Hong Kong on September 19, the Philippines on September 25, Malaysia on October 10, and Singapore on October 31, 2013. It was also released in Thailand on January 9, 2014, and Russia and other Commonwealth of Independent States markets on March 20, 2014. In Taiwan, the film opened on December 6, 2013. It was released in South Korea on March 13, 2014, where it recorded 12,696 admissions.

=== Home media ===
Sadako 3D 2 was made available for rental on February 19, 2014 and then released on DVD and Blu-ray by Kadokawa in Japan on February 28, 2014. The home-video editions included a separate "Smart 4D" version designed to interact with the film's accompanying smartphone application. A limited three-disc collector's edition featured a Blu-ray supporting both 2D and 3D playback, a DVD containing the Smart 4D version, and a bonus DVD featuring behind-the-scenes footage, cast interviews and promotional events.

Outside Japan, the film was released on DVD and 2D/3D Blu-ray in Hong Kong on February 28, 2014 by Intercontinental Video, under the title Sadako 2. Both formats included English and Chinese subtitles. In South Korea, Media Hub released the film on DVD on May 21, 2014. In Brazil, the film was released as A Invocação 2 on DVD and Blu-ray by Focus Filmes, with the Blu-ray edition released on July 31, 2014.

== Reception ==
Sadako 3D 2 opened in sixth place at the Japanese box office, attracting 113,835 admissions and grossing ¥160.6 million during its opening weekend. Compared with its predecessor, Sadako 3D (2012), the sequel achieved 65% of its opening-weekend revenue and 74% of its admissions. According to Box Office Mojo, the film ultimately grossed approximately $7 million in Japan and $8.4 million worldwide. In Malaysia, it was the highest-grossing Japanese film of 2013, earning approximately RM1.1 million and attracting 86,000 admissions, according to a report by the Japan External Trade Organization. Outside Japan, the film's highest-grossing market recorded by Box Office Mojo was Russia and the Commonwealth of Independent States, where it earned $812,304.

The film received largely negative reviews from Japanese critics. Cinema Today published three reviews averaging two out of five stars. Setsu Shimizu criticised the film's slow pacing and the limited effectiveness of its smartphone-linked "Sma4D" presentation. Hideyuki Nakazawa criticised its confusing storytelling and excessively dark visuals, while Harumi Nakayama acknowledged the novelty of the interactive presentation but argued that it distracted audiences from the narrative.

In a more favourable review, James Mudge of BeyondHollywood argued that the sequel improved upon its predecessor through greater emotional depth, imaginative supernatural sequences and less intrusive use of 3D effects. Although he found the film less frightening than the earlier Ring entries, he considered it an entertaining example of commercial Japanese horror that made effective use of Sadako's established mythology.

== See also ==
- List of ghost films
