= Sadako 3D =

- Japanese theatrical release poster
- Directed by: Tsutomu Hanabusa
- Written by: Satomi Ishihara
- Screenplay by: Yoshinobu Fujioka; Tsutomu Hanabusa
- Story by: Koji Suzuki
- Based on: S by Koji Suzuki
- Produced by: Atsuyuki Shimoda
- Starring: Satomi Ishihara; Koji Seto; Yusuke Yamamoto
- Cinematography: Nobushige Fujimoto
- Music by: Kenji Kawai
- Production company: Kadokawa Shoten Company
- Release date: May 12, 2012 (Japan)
- Running time: 96 minutes
- Country: Japan
- Language: Japanese
- Box office: $20.3 million

Sadako 3D (Japanese: 貞子3D) is a 2012 supernatural horror film directed by Tsutomu Hanabusa, loosely based on the novel S by Koji Suzuki.

== Plot ==
A mysterious, white-clad man drops a long-haired woman into a well. The well is full of women, all with long hair, all dressed in night dresses.

Thirteen years after the original film, two suicides prompt Detective Koiso and his partner to investigate a string of mysterious deaths. The deaths involve video played on devices; just before the deaths, a voice says, "You're not the one". While Koiso is unconvinced, his partner deduces that the deaths are the result of a cursed video that online artist Seiji Kashiwada created.

Akane Ayukawa, a homeroom teacher of a schoolgirl who died, discovers the schoolgirl's best friend Risa had been looking into the cursed video. The video had been deleted, but the Error 404 message in its wake prompts the video to play when the viewer is alone. In it, Kashiwada allows himself to be killed by a long-haired woman. When the video ends, Risa is attacked; Akane arrives just in time to save her. The ghost tells Akane that she is "the one". Akane screams, and the computer is destroyed. Meanwhile, Koiso and his partner scout Kashiwada's apartment, noting the furniture and decorative wallpaper, which look like a set. The landlady notes that everything is superficial.

Akane is a telekinetic who displayed her power years ago when a maniac attacked her high school. Though she saved the school, she was branded a freak. Takanori Andō, son of Mitsuo Andō from the previous film, and a boy who appreciates her abilities, grows up to be her boyfriend. She soon realizes the video is targeted at her when, at their home, the video plays, and the woman appears. Multiple screens show the woman attacking. Takanori and Akane run to a street, where they believe themselves safe, but a large LCD truck shows a giant version of the ghost, who snatches Takanori away.

Until his partner commits suicide in front of him, Detective Koiso continues to doubt the existence of the film, even when it is revealed that the original broadcast of the online video killed its initial viewers and employees of the site where it was uploaded. Koiso makes his way to Kashiwada's apartment, eager to find answers. He discovers the wallpaper is a horde of white butterflies hiding notes and history. Kashiwada had been attempting to resurrect Sadako Yamamura, as revenge against the human populace for persecuting him. He initially kidnapped long-haired women and threw them down the well, alive. However, when it was revealed that a body could not be found that way, he orchestrated the "cursed video" so that the video would find the perfect host for her.

Koiso finds Akane, whom he'd interrogated previously, and the two of them journey to the old Yamamura household. It no longer has the inn, and a "new" decrepit mall was beside the well. Upon approach to the well, a freakish-looking Sadako facsimile appears and attacks Koiso, biting his neck. The women that had been thrown into the well had become imperfect versions of Sadako. They attack Akane, but with stealth and resistance, Akane prevails against the imperfect Sadakos.

When she arrives at the center of the derelict building, she discovers Takanori has been trapped in a mobile phone at the center of the room. A legion of imperfect Sadakos arrive, but her fear triggers her telekinetic powers, which decimates them. Akane is transported to the roof where the "real" Sadako has been waiting. Sadako says they are exactly the same, which Akane denies; Sadako uses her powers to destroy, while she helps people. Seeing Takanori with a knife to his throat, Akane trades herself for his life. Sadako agrees and goes into her. Akane is overlain with a large amount of the ghost's hair and is buried inside it.

Takanori, now free from Sadako's thrall, destroys the phone. The roof gives and Akane drops to the floor below covered in Sadako's hair, but she escapes alive. In a mid-credits scene, it was shown that just outside the building beside the well, Kashiwada's landlord moves away and her words, "Isn't it all artificial?" echo. In the post-credits scene, the intro to Kashiwada's video plays again, but his introduction changes: "Here we go again".

== Cast ==
- Satomi Ishihara as Akane Ayukawa
- Koji Seto as Takanori Ando
- Yusuke Yamamoto as Seiji Kashiwada
- Ryosei Tayama as Detective Koiso
- Ai Hashimoto as Sadako Yamamura

== Production ==
Sadako 3D revived the Japanese Ring film series 12 years after Ring 0: Birthday. Producer Reiko Imayasu later explained that the film was conceived during the worldwide 3D cinema boom following Avatar. Tsutomu Hanabusa was brought in to direct, while Yoshinobu Fujioka and Hanabusa were brought in to write a screenplay based on an original story by Koji Suzuki. The project was conceived to be a 3D film to revolve around the idea of having Sadako literally emerge from the cinema screen.

The film marked Satomi Ishihara's first appearance in a horror film. In an interview with Cinema Today, Ishihara described the physical demands of the production, particularly the action sequences involving running, falling down stairs and performing against strong wind effects. Although stunt performers were used for some sequences, Ishihara performed portions of the action herself.

== Marketing ==
The publicity team shifted from scary Sadako to a more humorous character to appeal to teens and people in their twenties. Marketing included Sadako throwing a pitch at a baseball game, and cosplayers moving through Shibuya.

A special one-night screening, titled Sadako 4D, was arranged for June 7, 2012, at Kadokawa Cinema Shinjuku in Tokyo. The event was designed to incorporate physical effects and audience interactions, including smoke effects, performers dressed as Sadako, and simulated attacks on audience members during the film.

== Release ==
Sadako 3D was released theatrically in Japan on May 12, 2012. The film received international theatrical releases in Hong Kong and South Korea on June 14, 2012, followed by Singapore on June 21, Russia on August 2, Malaysia on August 30, and Taiwan on August 31. It subsequently opened in Ukraine on November 8, 2012, and Germany on April 4, 2013, where it was released under the title Sadako 3D – Ring Originals 3. A theatrical release in Thailand followed on September 12, 2013. The film was also screened in the Casa Àsia section of the 2012 Sitges Film Festival.

=== Home media ===
Sadako 3D was released on Blu-ray and DVD in Japan on October 31, 2012, by Kadokawa. The Blu-ray supported both 2D and 3D playback, while a limited collector's edition of 4,444 sets included a bonus DVD featuring behind-the-scenes footage, promotional events and interviews, alongside a commemorative photo booklet.

In the United States, the film was released on Blu-ray, DVD and digital platforms by Well Go USA Entertainment on June 4, 2013.

Outside Japan and the United States, Sadako 3D was released on DVD in South Korea on October 25, 2012 by Art Service. In Hong Kong, Intercontinental Video released the film on DVD and 2D/3D Blu-ray on November 1, 2012, with English and Chinese subtitles. In Taiwan, the film was released on DVD and Blu-ray on January 18, 2013 by Tai Wan Jiao Chuan. In Germany, Ascot Elite Home Entertainment released the film on DVD, Blu-ray and 3D Blu-ray on August 27, 2013 under the title Sadako – Ring Originals. In Brazil, Focus Filmes released the film on DVD and Blu-ray in May 22, 2014 under the title A Invocação.

== Reception ==
Sadako 3D opened at number two at the Japanese box office, attracting 154,148 admissions and grossing ¥246.4 million during its opening weekend. By the end of 2012, the film had grossed ¥1.35 billion in Japan. The film was considered a commercial success in Japan. Following strong attendance during its first ten days, distributor Kadokawa expanded its theatrical release by ten additional screens on May 26, 2012.

Internationally, Sadako 3D grossed approximately US$1.01 million in Hong Kong, ranking 51st at the territory's box office for 2012. In Russia and the Commonwealth of Independent States, the film attracted 123,612 admissions and grossed 30.1 million roubles, according to Russian film industry publication Kinometro.

Critically, Sadako 3D was poorly received. Craig Skinner of HeyUGuys rated it 1.5/5, criticizing the thin characters, weak plot and overuse of 3D gimmicks. Steve Barton of Dread Central rated it 1/5, criticizing its CGI creatures, 3D effects and departures from the earlier Ring mythology. James Marsh of Screen Anarchy was similarly critical, arguing that the film's repetitive jump scares, computer-generated creatures and reliance on modern digital technology failed to recreate the psychological horror of the original Ring. He also criticised the film's narrative and character motivations.

James Mudge of BeyondHollywood offered a more favourable assessment, finding the first half unfocused and the CGI effects unconvincing but praising the increasingly bizarre second half, action sequences and use of contemporary technology. He considered the film an enjoyable, if inferior, addition to the franchise.

== Sequel ==
A sequel to Sadako 3D, titled Sadako 3D 2, was released on August 30, 2013.

== See also ==
- List of ghost films
