= 15th Yokohama Film Festival =

1994 film festival in Yokohama, Japan

- Location: Kannai Hall, Yokohama, Kanagawa, Japan
- Founded: 1980
- Festival date: 13 February 1994

The 15th Yokohama Film Festival (第15回ヨコハマ映画祭) was held on 13 February 1994 in Kannai Hall, Yokohama, Kanagawa, Japan.

== Awards ==
- Best Film: All Under the Moon
- Best Film Score: Hajime Kaburagi – Tsuge Yoshiharu World: Gensenkan Shujin
- Best New Actor: Goro Kishitani – All Under the Moon
- Best Actor: Hiroyuki Sanada – We Are Not Alone, Nemuranai Machi: Shinjuku Same, Yamai wa Ki Kara: Byōin e Ikō 2
- Best Actress: Isako Washio – Bloom in the Moonlight
- Best New Actress:
  - Kyōko Toyama – Kōkō Kyōshi
  - Tomoko Tabata – Moving
- Best Supporting Actor: Masato Hagiwara – Kyōso Tanjō, All Under the Moon, A Class to Remember
- Best Supporting Actress:
  - Kaoru Mizuki – Tsuge Yoshiharu World: Gensenkan Shujin
  - Ruby Moreno – All Under the Moon
- Best Director: Yoichi Sai – All Under the Moon
- Best New Director: Toshihiro Tenma – Kyōso Tanjō
- Best Screenplay: Nobuyuki Isshiki – We Are Not Alone, Yamai wa Ki Kara: Byōin e Ikō 2, Graduation Journey: I Came from Japan
- Best Cinematography: Junichi Fujisawa – All Under the Moon
- Special Prize: Teruo Ishii – Tsuge Yoshiharu World: Gensenkan Shujin – For his career and for directing the film.

== Best 10 ==
1. All Under the Moon
2. Moving
3. Sonatine
4. We Are Not Alone
5. Bloom in the Moonlight
6. Tsuge Yoshiharu World: Gensenkan Shujin
7. Nemuranai Machi: Shinjuku Same
8. Dying at a Hospital
9. Haruka, Nostalgia
10. Kyōso Tanjō

runner-up: J Movie Wars
