= Sorimachi =

Sorimachi (written: 反町) is a Japanese surname. Notable people with the surname include:

- Katsuhiko Sorimachi, Japanese lawyer
- Takashi Sorimachi (反町 隆史, born 1973), Japanese actor and singer
- Yasuharu Sorimachi (反町 康治, born 1964), Japanese footballer and manager
- Y. Sorimachi (astronomer), Japanese astronomer
