= I'm Mita, Your Housekeeper. =

Japanese TV series

- Poster
- Genre: Family drama Mystery
- Written by: Kazuhiko Yukawa
- Directed by: Ryuichi Inomata; Toya Sato; Jun Ishio; Ken Higurashi
- Starring: Nanako Matsushima; Yumi Shirakawa
- Opening theme: "Main Thema of Mita" by Yoshihiro Ike
- Ending theme: "Yasashiku Naritai" by Kazuyoshi Saito
- Composer: Yoshihiro Ike
- Country of origin: Japan
- Original language: Japanese
- No. of seasons: 1
- No. of episodes: 11 (list of episodes)

Production
- Executive producer: Yoshiki Tanaka
- Producers: Futoshi Ohira, Masaharu Ota
- Production locations: Aka Rengasoko (Yokohama); Chiba Zoological Park
- Running time: 46 minutes (ep. 2-8); 60 minutes (ep. 1, 9-11)

Original release
- Network: NTV
- Release: October 12 – December 21, 2011

Related
- The Suspicious Housekeeper

I'm Mita, Your Housekeeper. (家政婦のミタ, Kaseifu no Mita; lit. "Mita the Housekeeper") is a 2011 Japanese television drama series. The plot centers on a family that hires Akari Mita (played by actress Nanako Matsushima) as a housekeeper to upkeep their recently deceased mother's house, which has been thrown into disarray. Mita will do anything that her employer orders her to do, except smiling or revealing her past.

This television series was broadcast from October 12 to December 21, 2011, as part of Nippon Television's Tears Wednesday time slot, which airs every Wednesday from 10:00 to 10:54 pm. I'm Mita, Your Housekeeper. garnered an average viewership rating of 25.2%. Its last episode garnered a viewership rating of over 40% when it aired, making it the highest watched show of 2011 in Japan.

I'm Mita, Your Housekeeper. won several awards, including "Best Drama" at the 71st Television Drama Academy Awards. Despite the show's popularity, its writer revealed that there will not be any sequels to the series.

== Plot ==
The Asuda family—a father, Keiichi, and four children ranging in age from 5 to 16—are still grieving over the death of the mother, Nagiko. Through an agency, the father hires a new housekeeper to take charge of the housework. They get Mita, an impassive person who does her job impeccably, but speaks in monotones and completely suppresses her emotions. The agency owner warns the father to be careful about what family members ask Mita to do, because she will do anything that she is ordered to do, even going as far as to kill someone. The only thing she will not do is a task that requires her to smile or to speak about or reveal her past. During this period of time, the family becomes fragmented, as they each blame themselves for the mother's death. Mita helps guide the family through these problems, though she does not explicitly give them advice.

Eventually, the family manages to come to terms with their mother's death. They in turn help Mita to overcome her extremely traumatic past, because of which she cannot smile or speak her mind. Thanks to their constant care for her, Mita gradually starts to discover love again. However, Mita knows that she cannot become the stepmother of these children, and thus takes the drastic step of becoming a cruel and ultimately short-lived stepmother. In the end, Urara, the children's aunt, becomes their stepmother. Mita then reveals that she cannot work for them anymore, since she has found employment elsewhere. On Christmas Eve, the family finally managed to make Mita smile during their last dinner together. With the family having found their priorities in life, Mita leaves the family on Christmas Day to work for yet another household.

Other characters include Urara—a kindly and well-intended woman who is the sister of the deceased mother but is also something of a klutz with a knack for showing up at inopportune moments and messing up—and Yoshiyuki Yūki—Urara's father (the children's grandfather), who holds his son-in-law responsible for his daughter Nagiko's death; his anger and frustration gradually dissipate over the course of the events of the series. There is also a nosy and unpleasant neighbor who behaves in quite a cruel way to the Asudas, although she has her own problems.

== Cast ==
=== Harumi Housekeeping Agency ===
- Nanako Matsushima as Akari Mita (三田 灯; 36 years old)

The housekeeper of the Asuda household. She does not smile, and is very efficient in carrying out her duties. Beneath her facade however, she has had the traumatic experience of losing all the people that she loved most, including her father, husband, and son, all of whom died under tragic circumstances. Because of this, she dares not start to love another person, for the fear that she might bring them ill-luck. Eventually, she starts to feel emotions again after the Asuda family's constant pressure for her to show her own feelings.

- Yumi Shirakawa as Akemi Harumi (晴海 明美)

She is the head of the housekeeper agency that employs Akari. Harumi also used to be the housekeeper for Mita's family, and therefore knows her the best. She hopes that Mita will eventually smile of her own free will. Harumi later shifts the housekeeping agency to the middle of Tokyo (bringing Mita along with her) because the former building was too old.

=== Asuda household ===
- Hiroki Hasegawa as Keiichi Asuda (阿須田 恵一)

He is the head of the Asuda household. He wanted to divorce his wife Nagiko to marry Kazama, with whom he was having an affair. This led to his wife's suicide. When his children found out, he and his children fell apart, but reunite with Mita's help. His domestic troubles also result in him losing his prestigious job as a section chief in a reputable company. On the other hand, after this incident, he realizes that his children are an important part of his life.

- Shiori Kutsuna as Yui Asuda (阿須田 結; 17 years old)

The eldest child in the family. She is a second-year high school student and a member of her school's photography club. She is blamed for being the cause of her mother's misery, because her parents were forced to marry due to the fact that Nagiko was pregnant with her. Yui nearly commits suicide after discovering that her boyfriend is actually toying with her. She even asks Mita to kill her, though Mita is stopped in time. Yui later acts as a mother to the rest of the family, helping with housework and making important decisions. Yui's name implies her role in the family—the role of being the one who bonds the family.

- Taishi Nakagawa as Kakeru Asuda (阿須田 翔; 14 years old)

The eldest son in the family. He is a student in a public junior high school, and the captain of the school's basketball team. He is also a hot-headed person, and always makes rash decisions. However, he is very protective of his family members. His name 'Kakeru' symbolizes his role as the protector of the Asuda family.

- Shūto Ayabe as Kaito Asuda (阿須田 海斗; 12 years old)

The youngest son in the family. He is a sixth-grade student in elementary school, and is the class president of his class. Kaito aims to achieve high grades in order to enter a prestigious privately run junior high school. He has a calm personality, and is the one who comes up with solutions to solve the family's problems. Kaito's name is a pun, meaning that he will be "the one who finds answers to the family's problems".

- Miyu Honda as Kii Asuda (阿須田 希衣; 6 years old)

The youngest member of the family. She is a very inquisitive girl, and always asks the question of "What is [that]?" whenever somebody uses a difficult word or phrase in front of her. The family decides to live together once again because of her suicidal threats. Kii's name comes from the term "key person", which reflects her role as the key source of happiness in the family.

- Yūko Daike as Nagiko Asuda (阿須田 凪子)

The now-deceased wife of Keiichi. She committed suicide after Keiichi gave her a set of divorce papers to sign. Because of her suicide, the Asuda family was thrown into turmoil.

=== Yūki household ===
- Saki Aibu as Urara Yūki (結城 うらら; 28 years old)

She is the sister of Nagiko and a P.E. teacher at Yui's high school. Urara is always doomed with bad luck, and everything she undertakes in good faith ends in failure. Despite that, she has a cheery personality and always wears a smile on her face. She confesses her love for Keiichi; however, knowing that the love is ill-fated, she instead marries someone else. However, thanks to Mita, the Asuda family realizes that she is an important member of the family, and she actually wards off the family's bad luck. In the end, the Asuda family chooses Urara over Mita to be their mother (which was Mita's plan) and removes Urara from her wedding ceremony. Urara agrees that although she will not marry Keiichi, she will be the family's "mother".

- Sei Hiraizumi as Yoshiyuki Yūki (結城 義之; 68 years old)

Keiichi's stubborn father-in-law and a school principal. He disapproves of Keiichi after his shotgun marriage to Nagiko, believing Keiichi seduced his daughter. He nearly adopts the Asuda children against their wishes, believing that he can do a better job raising them than Keiichi. However, he softens his attitude towards the family after Mita pretends to be Nagiko's ghost at the Asuda family's orders. Although he eventually uncovers the hoax, he is very touched by Mita's account. Towards the end of the show, he becomes a doting grandfather towards the Asuda children.

=== Mita household ===
- Yuu Kamio as Naoya Mita (三田 直也)

Mita's deceased husband. Naoya was a successful doctor, and was 37 years old when he died in a fire that Mita's half-brother started due to a dispute.

- Kanata Fujimoto as Jun Mita (三田 純)

Mita's deceased son. Jun also died in the fire that killed his father. Mita is constantly haunted by his pleas for help he made before he burned to death.

- Miyoko Akaza as Mita's mother-in-law

She constantly blames Mita for Naoya's death, saying that her smile brought bad luck to her loved ones. She ordered Mita to not smile again to show that she was truly remorseful for Naoya's death.

- Kei Sunaga as Mita's father-in-law

He also blames Mita for the death of his son.

=== Minagawa household ===
- Hitomi Sato as Mariko Minagawa (皆川 真利子; 39 years old)

The neighbor of the Asuda household. She disapproves of the Asuda household because they have no mother. She is extremely protective of her son, Tsubasa, and is also concerned about his studies. However, when she discovered that her own husband was having an affair behind her back, she ordered Mita (who was their housekeeper at the time) to kill the whole family. She was chased out of the house after her plan was uncovered.

- Ryūga Nakanishi as Tsubasa Minagawa (皆川 翼; 6 years old)

The son of Mariko, and Kii's classmate. He revealed that his father was having an affair.

- Masanori Ikeda as Isao Minagawa (皆川 功)

Mariko's husband. He revealed that he regretted marrying Mariko, and had a secret affair behind her back.

=== Others ===
- Maho Nonami as Mie Kazama, Keiichi's coworker
- Syuusuke Saito as Takuya Ozawa, Yui's senior in school. He was also once Yui's boyfriend.

== Production ==
I'm Mita, Your Housekeeper. was first announced on August 12, 2011. It was announced that Nanako Matsushima will be the lead actress in the series, her first role in a television drama series after a two-year hiatus.

Nanako said that she was familiar with the writer of I'm Mita, Your Housekeeper., since they had collaborated on drama series like Great Teacher Onizuka and Majo no Jōken (which are Nanako's signature works), though this was the first time they had collaborated on a family drama. She added that she was "happy to challenge a new genre".

== Broadcast ==
I'm Mita, Your Housekeeper. aired in Nippon TV's Tears Wednesday drama time slot, every Wednesday from 10:00 to 10:54 pm. Due to the popularity of the series, episodes 9, 10, and 11 all had an extended broadcast. Before the final episode of the series was shown, an hour-long special program featuring special behind-the-scenes footage of I'm Mita, Your Housekeeper. was broadcast.

Writer Kazuhiko Yukawa announced that there will be no sequels to this series, despite its popularity. He said that he wanted "to leave [the remainder] to the viewers' imaginations".

=== Episodes ===
Ep.	Episode title	Romanized title	Translation of title	Broadcast date	Ratings
1	崩壊寸前の家庭にやって来た笑顔を忘れた氷の女…	Hōkai sunzen no katei ni yattekita egao o wasureta kōri no onna…	An emotionless women who has forgotten how to smile comes to a household that is on the verge of breaking up	October 12, 2011	19.5%
2	僕を裏切ったアイツを殺して	Boku o uragitta aitsu o koroshite	Kill that double-crosser	October 19, 2011	18.7%
3	母を殺した父の正体を暴いて	Haha o koroshita chichi no shōtai o abaite	The truth of Papa driving Mama to commit suicide is exposed	October 26, 2011	19.8%
4	あなたの愛娘を誘拐しました	Anata no manamusume o yūkai shimashita	Your daughter has been kidnapped	November 2, 2011	19.5%
5	全部脱いで! …承知しました	Zenbu nuide! … Shōchishimashita	Take off all your clothes… Very well	November 9, 2011	22.5%
6	私を殺して! …承知しました	Watashi o koroshite! … Shōchishimashita	Kill me… Very well	November 16, 2011	23.4%
7	死ぬまで二度と笑いません…	Shinu made nidoto waraimasen…	Even until I die, I will not smile again	November 23, 2011	23.5%
8	私の過去、すべてお話します	Watashi no kako, subete ohanashi shimasu	I will tell you my whole past	November 30, 2011	29.6%
9	最終章の始まり! 一筋の涙…炎の中で私を死なせて	Sai shūshō no hajimari! Hitosuji no namida…-en no naka de watashi o shina sete	'The beginning of the final chapter! A stream of tears… Let me die in the flames	December 7, 2011	27.6%
10	息子よ、夫よ、お願い…私も天国に連れて行って!	Musuko yo, otto yo, onegai… watashi mo tengoku ni tsureteitte!	My son! My husband! Please bring me to heaven, I beg you!	December 14, 2011	28.6%
11	本当の母親…それはあなたたちが決めることです!	Hontō no hahaoya… sore wa anatatachi ga kimeru kotodesu!	Who is your real mother… that is up to you all to decide	December 21, 2011	40.0%
Ratings for Kanto region (average rating: 25.17%)

== Reception ==
I'm Mita, Your Housekeeper. was extremely well received by Japanese television viewers. It garnered an average viewership rating of 25.17%, the highest of any 2011 Japanese television dramas. In addition, the "Mita effect" was attributed as a main factor that enabled Nippon Television to become the top broadcaster in Japan in 2011, beating the previous record-holder, Fuji Television.

In particular, the series' last episode achieved the highest viewership rating of 40.0%. At one point in the broadcast, the viewership ratings hit 42.8% in the Kantō region. This makes this episode the second-most watched Japanese television program of 2011, after the 62nd NHK Kōhaku Uta Gassen. The episode also ranks as the third-most viewed in the history of Japanese television dramas, excluding NHK's "Asadora" and "Taiga" dramas. Oricon noted that viewership ratings of 30% were previously considered the norm, but in modern days, viewership ratings of 40% can be considered "divine". Additionally, this episode achieved viewership ratings of 36.4% and 34.6% in the Kansai region and Nagoya, respectively.

=== Awards ===
Year	Award	Category	Result	Recipient
2011	71st Television Drama Academy Awards	Best Drama	Won	I'm Mita, Your Housekeeper.
2011	71st Television Drama Academy Awards	Best Actress	Won	Nanako Matsushima
2011	71st Television Drama Academy Awards	Best Supporting Actor	Won	Hiroki Hasegawa
2011	71st Television Drama Academy Awards	Best Screenwriter	Won	Kazuhiko Yukawa
2011	71st Television Drama Academy Awards	Best Director	Won	Ryuichi Inomata, Toya Sato, Jun Ishio, Ken Higurashi
2011	71st Television Drama Academy Awards	Best Theme Song	Won	"Yasashiku Naritai"
2012	Élan d'Or Award	Best Newcomer	Won	Hiroki Hasegawa
2012	Élan d'Or Award	Producer Award	Won	Futoshi Ohara

== Theme song ==
The theme song for I'm Mita, Your Housekeeper. is "Yasashiku Naritai" by Kazuyoshi Saito. This was revealed in an announcement made on September 29, 2011. "Yasashiku Naritai" was the first song Kazuyoshi provided for a Japanese television drama since the 2009 NHK drama Limit: Keiji no Genba 2. Main leads from I'm Mita, Your Housekeeper. were also featured in the song's music video.

The song later became Kazuyoshi's 39th single, released in Japan by Victor Entertainment on November 2, 2011. The single debuted at the 6th position on the Oricon Singles Chart, with its sales boosted by the show's good reception. It sold 70 thousand copies by December 27, 2011, a number that grew to over 2.5 million physical and digital copies by 2013, making it one of the best-selling singles in Japan. "Yasashiku Naritai" won "Best Theme Song" at the 71st Television Drama Academy Awards.

== Remake ==
A South Korean remake titled The Suspicious Housekeeper starring Choi Ji-woo and Lee Sung-jae was produced in 2013.

Preceded by Bull Doctor (06/07/2011 - 14/09/2011)	NTV Tears Wednesday 水曜ドラマ; Wednesdays 22:00 - 22:54 (JST)	Succeeded by Dirty Mama! (01/11/2012 - 14/03/2012)
