= Yumi Shirakawa =

Japanese actress

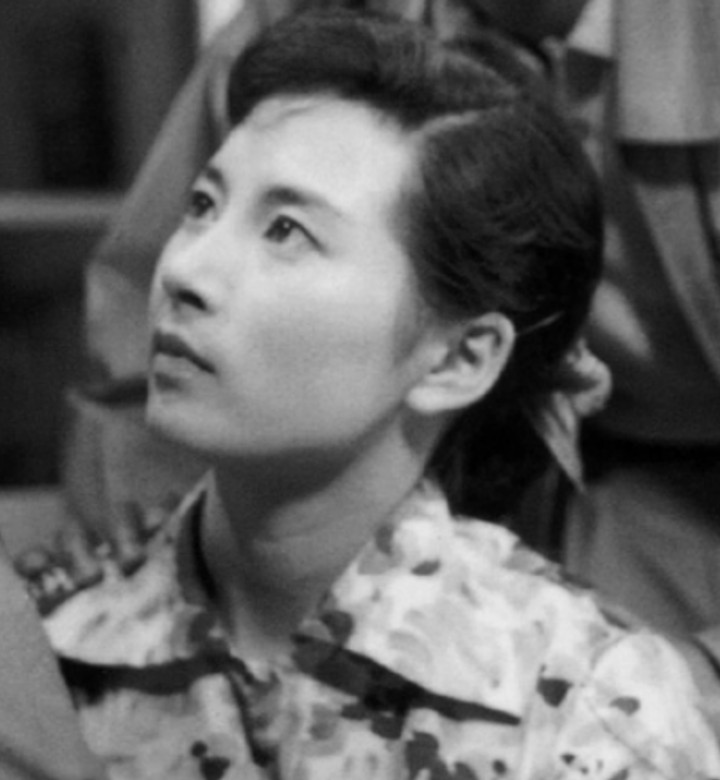
- Shirakawa on set of Rodan.
- Born: Akiko Yamazaki; 21 October 1936; Shinagawa, Tokyo, Japan
- Died: 14 June 2016 (aged 79); Meguro, Tokyo, Japan
- Occupation: Actress
- Years active: 1956–2016
- Spouse: Hideaki Nitani (m. 1964; died 2012)
- Children: 1

Yumi Shirakawa (白川 由美, Shirakawa Yumi; 21 October 1936 – 14 June 2016) was a Japanese film and television actress. She was called the Japanese Grace Kelly when she debuted. She was scouted and joined Toho film company. In the same year, she made her film debut with Narazumono. Her notable films are Rodan (1956), The H-Man (1958), and Yasujirō Ozu’s film The End of Summer (1961).

== Personal life ==
She was married to actor Hideaki Nitani until his death in 2012. Her daughter was born in 1964.

She died of heart failure on 14 June 2016, at the age of 79.

== Filmography ==
=== Film ===
Year	Title	Role	Notes	Ref.
1956	Rodan	Kiyo		
1957	Be Happy, These Two Lovers	Masako Shimizu		
1957	The Mysterians	Etsuko Shiraishi		
1958	The H-Man	Chikako Arai		
1958	The Badger Palace	Ocho		
1960	The Secret of the Telegian	Akiko Chujo		
1961	The Last War	Sanae		
1961	The End of Summer	Nakanishi Takako		
1961	Two Sons	Yoko		
1962	Chūshingura: Hana no Maki, Yuki no Maki	Ume		
1962	Gorath	Tomoko Sonoda		
1964	Yearning	Takako Morita		
1966	Adventure in Kigan Castle	Queen Izato		
2009	Niini no Koto o Wasurenaide	Chiyo Kawai		

=== TV series ===
Year	Title	Role	Notes	Ref.
1986	Hanekonma		Asadora	
1999	Majo no Jōken	Motoko Hirose	Asadora	
1998	Great Teacher Onizuka	Akira Sakurai		
2011	I'm Mita, Your Housekeeper.	Harumi Akemi		
2011	Ohisama	Setsuko Miyazawa	Asadora	
2013	Doctor-X: Surgeon Michiko Daimon	Hisae Asai	Season 2, Episode 7	
