= Nanako Matsushima =

Japanese actress and model (born 1973)

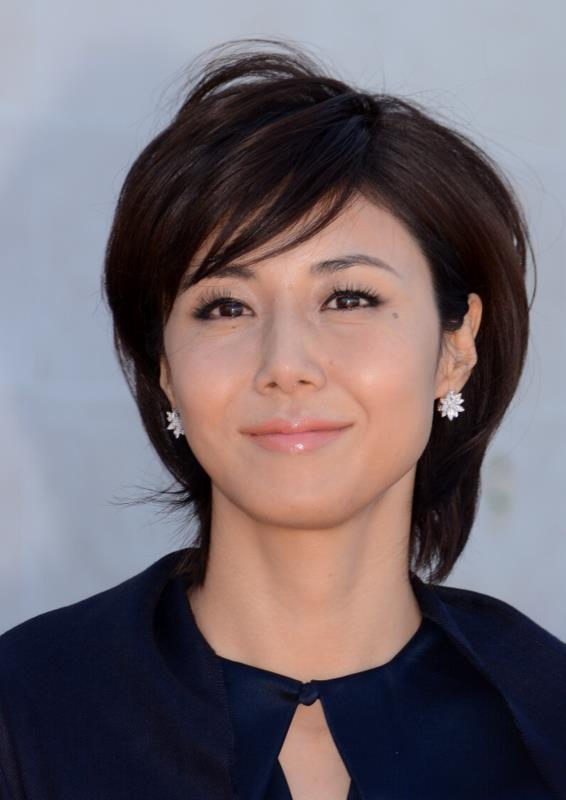
- Matsushima in May 2013
- Born: 13 October 1973 (age 53); Yokohama, Japan
- Occupations: Actress; model
- Years active: 1992–present
- Height: 1.73 m (5 ft 8 in)
- Spouse: Takashi Sorimachi (m. 2001)
- Children: 2

Nanako Matsushima (松嶋 菜々子, Matsushima Nanako; born 13 October 1973) is a Japanese actress and model. She is best known for starring in the horror film Ring (1998) and the drama series A Story of Love (1997) and I'm Mita, Your Housekeeper. (2011). The latter's final episode reached a viewer rating of 40%, making it one of the highest rated Japanese television dramas of all time.

== Early life ==
Nanako Matsushima was born in Yokohama on 13 October 1973. She spent her childhood in Tsurumi Ward, Yokohama City and Zama City until her debut. She has an older brother. Matsushima attended Sagami Women's University in Sagamihara, graduating in 2001.

== Career ==
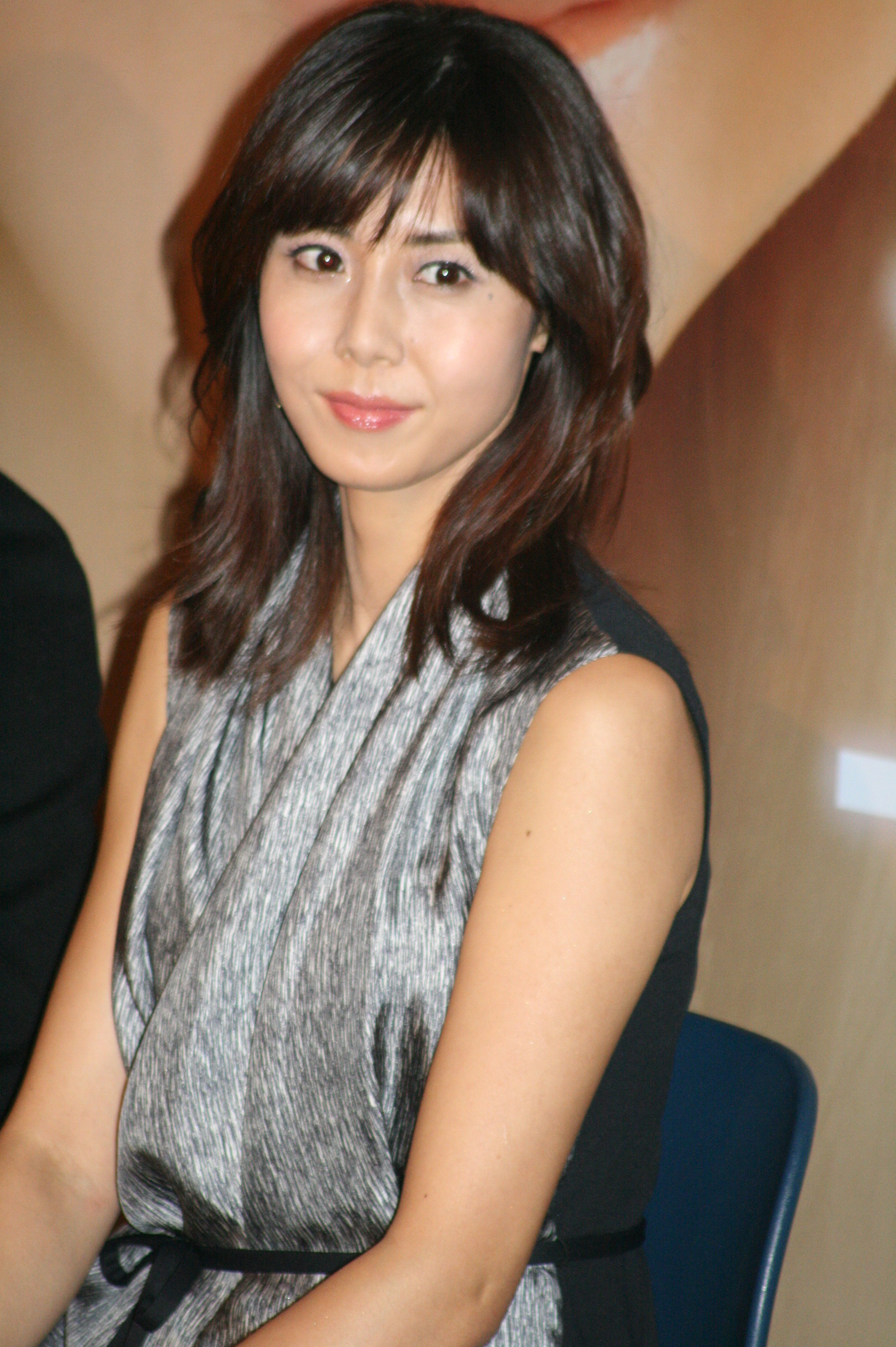
Matsushima in November 2009

In 1997, Matsushima starred as a poor but happy designer who happens to run a shop in a building owned by a wealthy and arrogant but dying rich man Shuichiro Harashima, played by Hiroyuki Sanada, in the drama A Story of Love (known as Konna Koi No Hanashi in Japanese). The drama chronicles the trial and tribulations that the leads undergo as their feelings developed into something more than mere friendship.

In 1998, Matsushima co-starred with her now-husband Takashi Sorimachi in the drama Great Teacher Onizuka, about a former delinquent turned teacher. The drama, based on a manga, received a 35.7 rating for its final episode, making it one of the highest rated Japanese dramas in history (#18 as of 2018). In November 2023, she co-starred alongside Sorimachi in a commercial for Shiseido and in 2025 once again she co-starred with her husband, Takashi Sorimachi for a new commercial for Shiseido. It was the couple's first shared commercial appearance since they first worked together in Great Teacher Onizuka and NHK's 2002 taiga drama "Toshiie to Matsu ~ kaga hyakumangoku monogatari ~", and their first time together following their marriage in 2001. In 2024 the couple appeared together in the remake of Great Teacher Onizuka, GTO Revival, where Matsushima guest starred, reprising her role as Azusa Fuyutsuki.

Matsushima starred in the horror film Ring (1998), which has since become regarded as one of the greatest horror films of all time. This marked her second collaboration with Hiroyuki Sanada, having previously worked together on the drama series A Story of Love.

In 1999, Matsushima appeared as the female lead in the drama Majo no Jōken (Terms for a Witch) which centres on the romance between a teacher and her student, with Hideaki Takizawa as the male lead. In the same year Matsushima also starring in a mystery murdered Television Drama "Koori no Sekai" also known in its English title "Ice World" where she co-starred together with Yutaka Takenouchi. The Television Drama centres on a story of an insurance investigator, played by Takenouchi, who investigate an insurance related murdered case where Matsushima played a High-School Teacher who was suspected in murdering her lovers due for an insurance fraud purpose as well as her colleague at High-School where she teach who suspected her. She appeared in the film Whiteout (2000), which grossed over 4.2 billion yen in Japan and earned her a nomination for the Outstanding Performance by an Actress in a Leading Role award at the 24th Japan Academy Film Prize.

Matsushima played Tsubaki Domyouji, sister of Arashi's Jun Matsumoto's main male lead Tsukasa Domyouji, in the 2005 drama Boys Over Flowers and its sequel, Boys Over Flowers 2, as well as the movie Hana yori Dango Final. Both dramas were a rating success with the final episode of Boys Over Flowers 2 peaking at 27.6. She starred alongside Matsumoto in 2012, in the comedy serial drama Lucky Seven, where she played his boss. They appeared together for a third time in the 2022 drama My Neighbor, Chikara, Matsushima played Matsumoto's character Chikara Nakagoshi's neighbor, Yoriko Michio. The two shared another stage in NHK's 2023 Taiga drama What Will You Do, Ieyasu?, with her playing the role of Odai no Kata, mother to Matsumoto's Tokugawa Ieyasu.

In 2011, Matsushima starred in I'm Mita, Your Housekeeper. The show's final episode garnered a rating of 40%, making it one of the highest rated Japanese dramas of all time.

In September 2021, Matsushima co-starred in a commercial for Uber Eats alongside Matt Kuwata.

== Personal life ==
Matsushima married actor Takashi Sorimachi on 21 February 2001. They have two daughters together, born on 31 May 2004 and 30 November 2007.

== Filmography ==
=== TV dramas ===
| Year | Title | Role | Notes | Ref. |
|---|---|---|---|---|
| 1992 | Shacho ni Natta Wakadaisho | Miwa Fujiki | | |
| 1996 | Sunflower | Nozomi Minamida | Lead role; Asadora | |
| 1997 | A Story of Love | Kaori Fujimura | | |
| 1998 | Sweet Season | Mahiro Fujitani | Lead role | |
| 1998–2026 | Great Teacher Onizuka (GTO) | Azusa Fuyutsuki | 2 seasons | |
| 1999 | Ice World | Tōko Egi | Lead role | |
| 1999 | Terms for a Witch | Michi Hirose | Lead role | |
| 1999–2026 | Emergency Room 24 Hours | Kaede Kojima | Lead role; 6 seasons | |
| 2000 | Perfect Woman | Sakurako Jinno | Lead role | |
| 2002 | Toshiie and Matsu | Maeda Matsu | Lead role; Taiga drama | |
| 2003 | The Beauty or the Beast | Makoto Takamiya | Lead role | |
| 2005 | Grave of the Fireflies | Hisako Sawano | Television film | |
| 2005–2007 | Boys Over Flowers | Tsubaki Domyoji | Special appearance; 2 seasons | |
| 2006 | Furuhata Ninzaburō | Kaede / Momiji | Episode 42 | |
| 2011 | I'm Mita, Your Housekeeper. | Akari Mita | Lead role | |
| 2012 | Lucky Seven | Toko Fujisaki | | |
| 2019 | Natsuzora: Natsu's Sky | Fujiko Shibata | Asadora | |
| 2022 | My Neighbor, Chikara | Yoriko Michio | | |
| 2023 | Kissing the Ring Finger | Shizuka Nitta | | |
| 2023 | What Will You Do, Ieyasu? | Odai no Kata | Taiga drama | |
| 2024 | GTO Revival | Azusa Fuyutsuki | Television film | |
| 2025 | Anpan | Tomiko Yanai | Asadora | |

=== Film ===
| Year | Title | Role | Notes | Ref. |
|---|---|---|---|---|
| 1998 | Ring | Reiko Asakawa | Lead role | |
| 1998 | Spiral | Reiko Asakawa | | |
| 1999 | Ring 2 | Reiko Asakawa | Special appearance | |
| 2000 | Whiteout | Chiaki Hirakawa | | |
| 2007 | Bizan: The Mountain of Mother's Love | Sakiko | Lead role | |
| 2010 | Ghost: In Your Arms Again | Nanami Hoshino | Lead role | |
| 2013 | Shield of Straw | Atsuko Shiraiwa | | |
| 2014 | When Marnie Was There | Yoriko Sasaki (voice) | | |
| 2018 | The Crimes That Bind | Hiromi Asai | | |
| 2019 | Almost a Miracle | Momoka Machida | | |
| 2021 | The Great Yokai War: Guardians | Reika | | |
| 2023 | Don't Call It Mystery: The Movie | | | |

== Awards and nominations ==
| Year | Award | Category | Work(s) | Result | Ref. |
|---|---|---|---|---|---|
| 1999 | 23rd Elan d'or Awards | Newcomer of the Year | Herself | Won | |
| 2000 | 9th TV Life Annual Drama Awards | Best Actress | Terms for a Witch, Emergency Room 24 Hours and Ice World | Won | |
| 2001 | 24th Japan Academy Film Prize | Best Actress | Whiteout | Nominated | |
| 2012 | 21st TV Life Annual Drama Awards | Best Actress | I'm Mita, Your Housekeeper. | Won | |
| 2012 | 15th Nikkan Sports Drama Grand Prix | Best Actress | I'm Mita, Your Housekeeper. | Won | |
