= Konna Koi no Hanashi =

Japanese television series

- Also known as: こんな恋のはなし
- Genre: Romantic; Drama
- Directed by: Ogura Hisao; Kono Keita; Hirano Shin
- Starring: Hiroyuki Sanada; Nanako Matsushima; Koji Tamaki; Naho Toda; Saya Takagi
- Country of origin: Japan
- Original language: Japanese
- No. of episodes: 14

Production
- Running time: 45 minutes
- Production company: Fuji Television

Original release
- Network: Fuji Television
- Release: 3 July – 18 September 1997

Konna Koi no Hanashi (こんな恋のはなし; A Story of Love) is a Japanese television drama starring Hiroyuki Sanada and Nanako Matsushima. It aired during the summer of 1997 in Japan, and in 2001 on KONG-TV in the United States. The original 12 episodes were split into 14 for the U.S. showing. A Story of Love dealt with social issues including poverty in first world countries and class barriers in Tokyo.

== Plot outline ==
Shuichiro Harashima (Hiroyuki Sanada), an upper-class and work-driven businessman, falls in love with Kaori Fujimura (Nanako Matsushima), a lower-class downtown sweetheart, and fights to save the doomed building in which she lives. Rumored to be cold-hearted and cruel, his love for Kaori and his growing friendship with her brother-in-law, Konosuke Shimodaira (Koji Tamaki), change him into a kind and caring person.

== Extended plot ==
Shuichiro Harashima is a cold-hearted businessman, whose only goal in life is to work hard and make money. After his father died when he was a child, he inherited the Harashima Conglomerate, a large company with new plans to knock down homes in the poorer parts of Tokyo to build new ones for richer people. He is powerful, cruel, merciless, and corrupted in his dealings at work, leaving him extremely lonely in his personal life. His plans for the future are cut short when he discovers he has an advanced case of stomach cancer and will be dead within six months. While at the doctor's office, he meets Konosuke Shimodaira, a local do-gooder whose big heart normally causes more trouble than it helps. When Harashima lends Konosuke 50 yen to pay his doctor's bill, Konosuke insists on paying it back straight away. He takes him to a bar where Harashima meets Konosuke's friends Nakahata, who has a habit of lying and gambling, "Sensei", who is trying to get into law school, and Yosaku, who has very bad manners.

After drinking too much, Konosuke takes Harashima home and puts him up for the night. The next day, after leaving, Harashima realizes he's left the watch his father dropped when he died. But before he can go back and get it, he gets a phone call from the company. Harashima becomes ruthless and hard in dealing with the problem with the rival companies who had blackened his name in the press. He carries on with his daily routine, including visiting the main Harashima store, where his father had started out. He stays after everyone has gone home, thinking about his father and. as he leaves, he is mistaken for a worker at the store by a gardener dropping off a plant for the main display.

By a strange twist of fate, he bumps into Kaori Fujimura, a poor, loving young woman who lives and works in the world ruled by Harashima. She mistakes him for the gardener, despite his smart dress, and presumes he's getting ready for a date. When Kaori notices Harashima's jacket gets dusty, she insists on cleaning it for him. He sits and listens to how she feels about her work and the Harashima store. She explains that though the store is becoming less popular and she dislikes the owner (Harashima), she doesn't want the store to fold. This makes Harashima curious and he is already bewitched by Kaori's beauty and her sunny, optimistic nature. Though he is unaware at first, he realizes on their second meeting that he has fallen head-over-heels in love with her.

With the events that occur, Harashima begins to realize what the values of friendship, loyalty, and love mean—but will he be able to reverse the fate of Kaori and Konosuke's doomed homes before his fate catches up with him?

== Cast ==
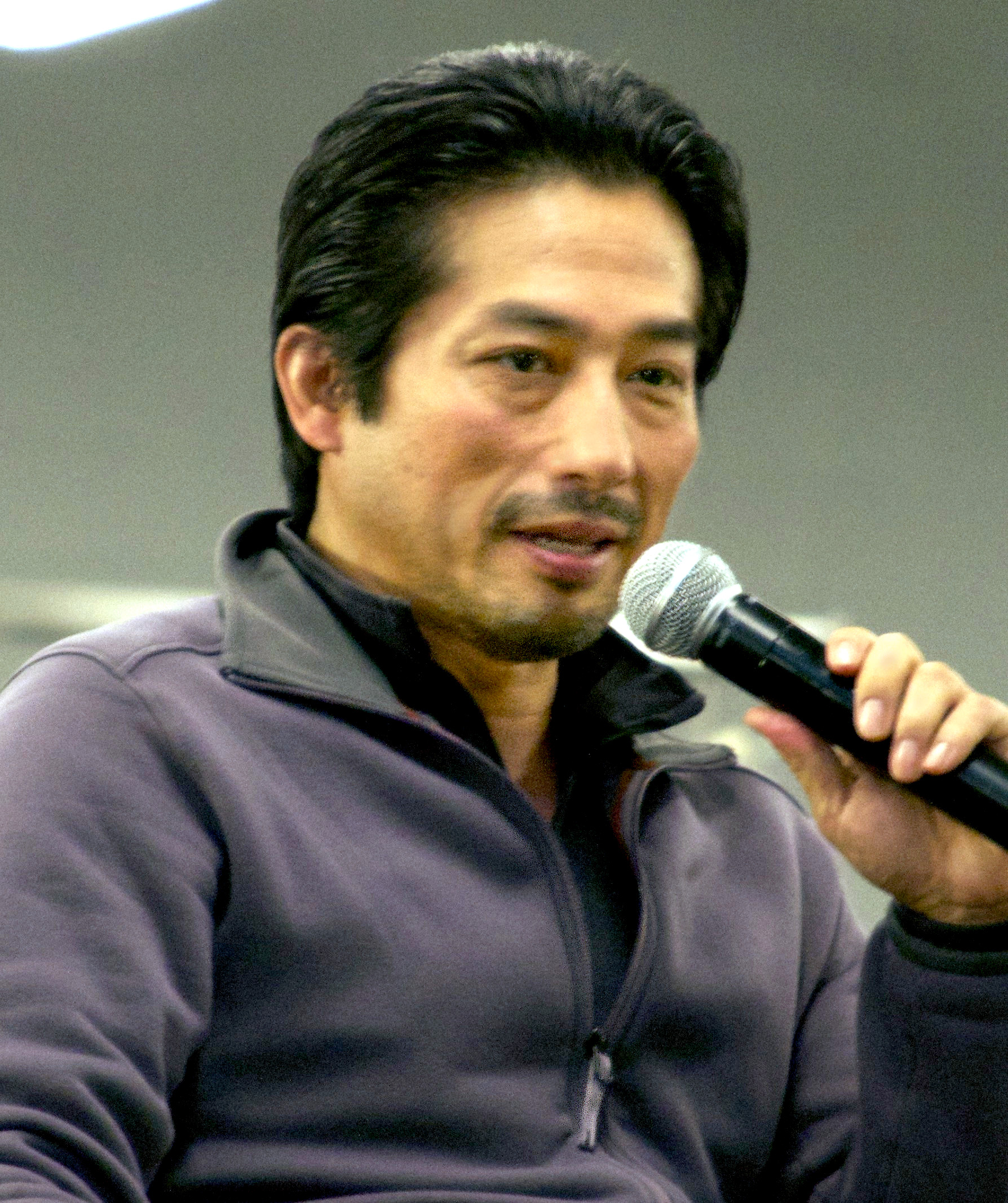
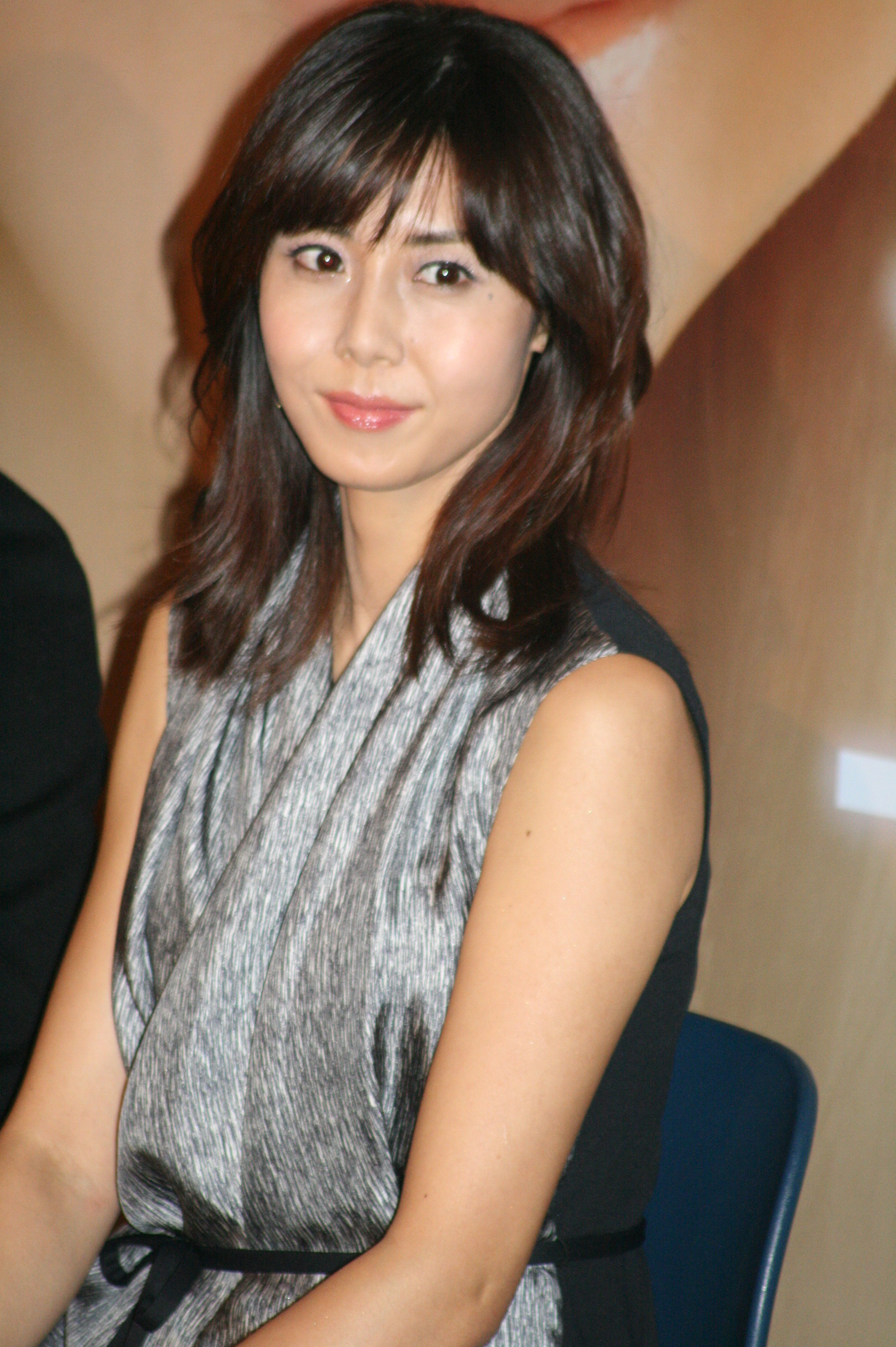
Hiroyuki Sanada (left) who played the role as Shuichiro Harashima and Nanako Matsushima (right) who played the role as Kaori Fujimura.
- Hiroyuki Sanada as Shuichiro Harashima
- Koji Tamaki as Konosuke Shimodaira
- Nanako Matsushima as Kaori Fujimura
- Naho Toda as Mayako Mizukoshi
- Saya Takagi as Misao Fujimura
- Yoko Saito as Hirano
- Yoshimasa Kondo as Norihiko Nakahata
- Hozumi Gōda as Dept. Chief Igarashi
- Yuuichi Haba as Dept. Chief Domoto
- Bsaku Satoh as Sensei
- Kenta Satoi as Director Ninagawa
- Yosuke Mikami as Shinpei Shimpaira

== Main characters ==
=== Shuichiro Harashima ===
He inherited Harashima Enterprises from his father when he was only nine. Harashima is 35 years old. Originally they just had a main store and small chain stores, but Harashima expanded it thought Japan and other parts of Asia. His father died telling him that love was just in the mind, leaving Harashima cruel, cold-hearted and selfish. Though he agreed to marry Mayako, daughter of a powerful politician, he wishes for it to improve his company's standing not for love. Harashima finds out he is going to die in just six months and wishes to finish his work and seal the company safely before his death. However, upon meeting Kaori, he falls in love with her and is unable to stop thinking about her. Though he discourages Konosuke's attempts to become friends with him, he starts to (slowly) begins to care about others and not just his company. He was born on December 4, 1961.

=== Kaori Fujimura ===
Kaori is everything the other women in Harashima's life are not. She's modest, selfless and poor, which makes her very attractive to him. Despite her rough start in life, she has come through and tried her best to make something of herself. She finds that she can relate well to Harashima because of how much they have in common, e.g., they are both orphans. When Kaori was quite young, she was in love with a man who she was going to marry, but he has cheated on her leaving her heartbroken. Kaori took a job at the Harashima main store because it brought her so much joy as a child; looking at the beautiful displays made her want to create them when she grew up so she could bring the same amount of joy to other poor children. Her over-protective sister, who always reminds Kaori of her habit of trusting people to easily, scolds Kaori often. Kaori falls deeply in love with Harashima, as he does with her but they find it hard to be accepted by their friends and families as they belong to different classes in society. She's twenty-three-years old and lives with her elder sister, Misao. Although she only live with her sister, Kaori and her sister Misao had a close relationship with Konosuke and his son Shinpei and at somepoint Kaori acted as Shinpei surrogate sister, such as going out together with Shinpei to amusement park, helping Shinpei doing his homework and even sharing each other about their feelings and thought.

=== Konosuke Shimodaira ===
Konosuke is the exact opposite of Harashima and yet they share similar histories. His father died with a smile on his face, telling him that he should respect and care for his friends, that love is a wonderful feeling that should be acted on and treated carefully, and that being good to others will always win the day. Most of the time, this theory backfires on him, but then again, so does Harashima's theory. Nonetheless, he argues to Harashima that he has lived a happier life than he has without money and with just his friends and family. Konosuke has feelings for Kaori's sister, but due to his selfless attitude to life he doesn't realise it nor does he realise that Misao feels the same about him.

=== Mayako Mizukoshi ===
She is twenty-five-years old, Harashima's fiancée and daughter of a big-time politician. All her life she had dreamt of marrying someone she truly loved and she is upset at the fact Harashima doesn't love her. Troubled by the fact that Harashima seems to have fallen in love with Kaori, she at first attempts to stop him from seeing her. She doesn't hold it against her and is moved by Kaori's generosity and kindness. Despite the fact she loves Harashima, too, she thinks that if she allows Harashima to see Kaori, he'll become tired of her. However, after they promise not see each other again and Mayako finds them together. In the end, her engagement to Harashima is broken off and she goes to Europe to study art, inspired by Kaori.

=== Misao Fujimura ===
Misao is thirty years old and takes her responsibility of being Kaori's guardian very seriously despite the fact Kaori has grown up. When their parents died, Misao raised and looked after Kaori with the help of Konosuke and his family. She works at the factory with Konosuke and the others, and tends to call everyone "Idiot" if they do something to displease her. She has feelings for Konosuke but never has a chance to tell him as he is too wrapped up in Harashima and Kaori's affair.

== Secondary characters ==
=== Hirano ===
Harashima's outstanding secretary who is the only person who Harashima trusts, even though he doesn't realise it. She is a loyal and devoted servant to Harashima. She has many contacts which in able her to help Harashima with many cases. At one point, she helps Konosuke find Harashima when he disappears.

=== Dept. Chief Igarashi ===
Igarashi is another top executive of Harashima Enterprises. Unlike Domoto who is greedy, merciless and thirst of power, Igarashi still have his humanitarian feeling in him and more prefer in emphasizing a Harashima Enterprises project which would give more benefit to the society. This can be seen by Igarashi proposal of the new town project that will be built in an area where Konosuke and Kaori Apartment are located, but will also suited with the existing society who already live in the area and gave more benefit to them, without using any cruel method such as demolizing and ousted the existing society who already live there which Domoto more prefer method. The proposal at first being rejected, but later-on was approved by Harashima who already gained his humanitarian feeling and was accepted. However, when Domoto ousted Harashima, Igarashi proposal was rejected and Igarashi was demouted. However Igarashi later-on work along together with Harashima and Hirano to oust Domoto and unveil his dirty business practice.

=== Dept. Chief Domoto ===
Merciless and cruel, Domoto has is eye of reaching the top of Harashima Enterprises. He often attempts to overthrow Harashima but is normally backed into a corner by Harashima's talent at being one step ahead of everyone. Domoto in described by others as a less attractive and less tolerable version of Harashima, who copies everything about Harashima, right down to his walk.

=== Mizukoshi ===
Mayako's father and a wealthy politician who cares only for money. He is selfish, bitter toward those who have little money and knows little about love. He uses Mayako as a way to get Harashima's money. He feels that anything can be solved with money. Upon finding that Kaori is Harashima's lover, he sends his secretary to give Kaori a "pay-off" in Harashima's name, without his knowledge. When Kaori sends the money back, the only reason he can imagine why she refused it was because it wasn't enough.

=== Norihiko Nakahata ===
Konosuke's friend who has a terrible gambling problem. As his debts rose he was forced the ask illegal dealers for a loan, who later came back to haunt him and blamed Konosuke who had agreed to be the guarantor. He tries to sell Harashima's father's watch to pay the debts, but it turned out be worthless. However, Harashima paid off his debts for him. Nakahata has a sick mother and Konosuke paid the fare for him to go and see her.

=== "Sensei" ===
Another one of Konosuke's friends, his real name is Sakai. Hoping to graduate law school and become a lawyer, the others rely on him to give them law advice. He is constantly turning to look in his law book to see if actions people make is legal. He takes over the factory after the president dies and even considers taking Harashima's offer of saving 10 of the workers. However, he decides to go down fighting with the other workers.

=== Yusaku ===
He's in his late twenties. He is one of the famous three who hang around with Konosuke, and he has a very bad temper. He's been in love with Kaori ever since high school, but she has never shown interest in him. When he finds out Kaori is Harashima's lover, he becomes terribly rude and says hurtful things to her. This is the only way he can deal with his rejection of her and his jealousy of Harashima.

=== Shinpei ===
Konosuke's nine-year-old son who regrets his poor life but loves his father very much. His mother tries to gain complete custody of him but he decides to stay with his father. Shinpei had a very close relation with Kaori and at somepoint Kaori acted as Shinpei's surrogate sister, such as helping Shinpei doing his homework, going together to amusement park and even sharing each other about their feelings and thought.

=== Zenkichi ===
Zenkichi owns the restaurant where Konosuke and the others live. He is very kind as he lend his money to his friends and the many causes they make. When Yusaku insults and has hostile feelings toward Kaori over her relationship with Harashima, he throws him out for not knowing how to treat a friend. His nature is similar to Konosuke's.

== Episode summaries ==
There were 12 episodes in the original Japanese airing. They were expanded into 14 episodes for the US release.

=== Episode 1 ===
Harashima finds out he has an incurable diseases and has little time left. Konosuke and the others face unemployment by the Harashima group. Meanwhile, Kaori meets an unknown stranger while working late at night. Later, Harashima returns to Konosuke in search of his watch only to discover that Nakahata has run away taking all the wages from the factory. Meanwhile, the unknown stranger comes to ask Kaori for a date. Elsewhere, Harashima finds out one of his workers has betrayed the company to one of their rivals.

=== Episode 2 ===
Nakahata went back to the Zenkichi restaurant where Konosuke and his friends use to hangout and Harashima, while his identity are still unknown to Konosuke and his friends, was at a presence too. However while in there a group of debt collector confronted Nakahata and ask to repay the 2.5 Million Yen he borrowed from them and telling Nakahata the watch, which actually belong to Harashima and was stolen by Nakahata, given to them to repay the debt wasn't even worth the amount of money Nakahata owe to them. However to their dismay, Harashima suddenly came up with a bank cheque book and written them a cheque which amount 2.5 Million Yen or equivalent with the amount Nakahata owe to them. Much to their surprise, Nakahata then apologized and ask for forgiveness to The Stranger for stealing his watch and thanks him for paying off his debt. Harashima then told Nakahata that sometimes if people get blinded by money, they may do things that could gone out of control. Konosuke and his friends then decide to collect some amount of money to repay it back to Harashima as a courtesy for paying off Nakahata debt and ask Kaori to return it to Harashima. Later that night Kaori accompanied Shinpei due to Konosuke who fell ill. Much to their joyness, both Kaori and Shinpei now bound an elder sister and younger brother relationship, thus making Kaori as a surrogate sister figure for Shinpei.

=== Episode 3 ===
Shinpei goes missing and everyone rushes out of work to find him. The man from Harashima Enterprises is there! Kaori while meeting The Stranger, then notified by Konosuke that Shinpei is missing, but has no idea where Shinpei is where about. However Kaori then realize that while playing together with Shinpei on the previous night, Shinpei then ask Kaori about a ride in amusement park such as screw coaster and carpet ride. Realize that Shinpei might have gone to an amusement park, The stranger and Kaori join in the search and indeed find Shinpai at a park near the amusement park. Shinpei then told Kaori that he was bullied by his classmate because Shinpei never go into amusement park. Saddened by the stories that Shinpei told, Kaori then took Shinpei to the amusement park and promise Shinpei to have a fun and joy in the amusement park. However once they arrived in the amusement park, the park has already closed, but later on to their surprise the amusement park then reopen again and the guard said that Kaori and Shinpei were given special service to the amusement park, along with The stranger. Both Shinpei, Kaori and The stranger spend much of fun and joy in the amusement park. However while everything is going so well in the amusement park, Kaori finds out that the stranger turns out to be Harashima, who actually own the amusement park and the one who order the amusement park to be reopen and given them special service. Learning that the Stranger is Harashima, Kaori runs off with Shinpei in humiliation.

=== Episode 4 ===
The man from Harashima Enterprises tries to use the reason that Konosuke along with other factory worker rushes out of work to find Shinpei as an excuse to fire them all in order to go through the process for closing the factory; however, after listening the excuse, instead of agreeing with the man's idea and suggestion, Harashima goes furious and berates the man for his inhumanity. However, much of the factory employees are still refused with the closing plan of the factory by Harashima group, including the president of the factory which later on confronted Harashima. The president of the factory dies after meeting the wrath of Harashima. As a result, Konosuke goes to see him and finds out who Harashima really is. Meanwhile, in Harashima's other life, he is overjoyed to see Kaori and even more thrilled that she has forgiven him. Mayako witnesses this and starts to worry that Harashima is having an affair.

=== Episode 5 ===
Misao catches on to Kaori and Harashima's secret "affair" and confides in Konosuke her concerns. Meanwhile, "Sensei" confides in Harashima that people from Harashima Enterprises had approached him with an offer to save 10 of the workers at the factory. Konosuke realises Harashima's will never change and he tells him he must never go near Kaori again.

=== Episode 6 ===
Kaori meets Mayako and is surprised when she claims to not mind if Harashima is seeing her. Misao finds out who Harashima and forbids Kaori from seeing him but Kaori runs away. When hearing this, Harashima rushes out into the night to find her — leaving Mayako cold.

=== Episode 7 ===
News gets out that Kaori spent the night with a wealthy man as Konosuke and Misao try to make sense of Kaori's feelings for Harashima. Mizukoshi finds out about Harashima's affair with Kaori, and Kaori's love is nearly dashed when a man claiming to be Harashima's servant offers her money in return for her silence. Kaori refuse the money and Konosuke who learn about it, later confront Harashima whom he thought to be the one responsible in ordering the servant to offer Kaori the silence money and Konosuke also told Harashima how Kaori are still deep in-love with him. Later-on in the night, Harashima came by to Konosuke's apartment to see Kaori to explain to him what really happened. However Harashima suddenly collapsed and was brought to Hospital by Konosuke, there Konosuke learn that Harashima is terminally ill and only have three months left to live. Saddened by what he heard, Konosuke then embrace Harashima and told him that he was very sorry for being mistaken about him this whole time.

=== Episode 8 ===
Kaori learn that Harashima visited her apartment and was brought to the hospital due to collapsed, when Kaori got into the hospital, Harashima already left. Later-on the next day, Shinpei asked Kaori to help him with his homework and while helping Shinpei doing his Homework, Kaori asked Shinpei why did Harashima came by to her apartment last night. Shinpei then tell Kaori that Harashima was actually intend to meet Kaori to tell her something while she's not there. Later-on while in the factory, Norihiko admit to Konosuke that his mother is terminally ill and that was the reason he is in a hugh debt. Under the advice of Konosuke, Norihiko then left Tokyo to go back to his hometown in-order to accompany his terminally ill mother. Meanwhile, a fire occurs on the department store and turns-out the fire came from Kaori display. Taking the blame for the fire, Kaori then offer her resignation and accept responsibility for it. However Harashima order for re-investigation of the cause of the fire at the Department Store which turns-out it was not came from Kaori Display. The head of the Department Store then apologized to Kaori and Kaori resume her work. Few days later while working at the Department Store, Mayako came by to see Kaori and the two going for lunch together. There Mayako admit that it was actually her father who send the servant to give Kaori the silence money and not Harashima.

=== Episode 9 ===
Shinpei asked Konosuke permission to go to the swimming pool. However turns-out Shinpei go visit his mother instead of going to swimming pool. Harashima who took notice of Shinpei going with someone instead of Konosuke then try to find-out what's going on. Shinpei's mother and Konosuke ex-wife convince Shinpei to leave Konosuke and live with her, especially due to Konosuke poor economic condition. Shinpei who's now confuse whether he should stay with his Father or go with his Mother, later-on ask both Kaori and Harashima for advice. Shinpei then decided to live with his mother and Harashima, over the request of Konosuke who can't take seeing Shinpei left him, agree to drive Shinpei to his mother. However at the last minute Shinpei change his mind and decided to stay living with Konosuke. Later at night, Kaori went out together with Shinpei to cheer him up, while the two eat together at a fast-food restaurant, Kaori then asked Shinpei why he suddenly changed his mind and decided to live with Konosuke, instead of with his mother. Shinpei told Kaori that not only he doesn't want to leave his father and his father's friend whom he already consider as his genuine family and much to Kaori's surprise that most of all Shinpei did not want to leave Kaori whom he admit that he already consider her as not only his sister, but also Kaori as his sibling like figure for Shinpei and he's been so thankful for Kaori's gracious to Shinpei this whole time, from Playing together with Shinpei, helping him doing his homework, going to amusement park together, spending time together and most of all accompanied Shinpei this whole time while he's alone. Kaori who was very touched by what Shinpei said, then embraced Shinpei in happiness and Kaori promise to Shinpei that she will not leave him alone and will be there for him every time he feels alone and in need of a company.

=== Episode 10 ===
Harashima who's know getting along very well with Konosuke, Kaori and their entourage, finally change his mind regarding the development project for the area where the factory and apartment where Konosuke, Kaori and their entourage live located. Harashima then decided to meet with the people around the apartment neighborhood. To their surprise, Konosuke entourage, from Norihiko, Yusaku, Sensei and Zenkichi, shocked to learn that The Stranger who already helped payoff Norihiko debt and done so many good things towards them is actually Harashima. However Harashima told all the people in the neighborhood that he has changed his mind regarding the project and will give allowances for those who decided to move from the area and for those who decided to stay in the area will be given special privilege in-order for them to continue to live in the neighborhood. To their surprise Harashima decision shocked not only the people in the neighborhood, but also other Harashima employee including Dept. Chief Domoto who's expecting to take as many profit as he can from the project.

=== Episode 11 ===
Kaori learns after overhearing Konosuke and Misao conversation that Harashima is terminally ill and only had three months to live. Saddened by what she overheard, Kaori then went to Harashima House and told him that she is indeed love him very much no matter what happened, even if he's only had three months to live. Meanwhile, the board in Harashima Enterprise grew furious over Harashima decision to change the project and decided to take any means necessary to kick Harashima from the chairman position. Meanwhile, Dept. Chief Domoto finds-out about Harashima terminal illness and decide to use it as a reason to kick Harashima from chairman position.

=== Episode 12 ===
Harashima is kick out of his position as Chairman of Harashima Enterprise by after the board was convince by Dept. Chief Domoto. The event reminds him of what his late father said that "Love" and "Friendship" is just a temporary illusion. However, after being accompanied by Kaori and Konosuke along with Harashima secretary Hirano and his old friend Igarashi, Harashima realize that he is not alone and still have people around him who cares towards him.

=== Episode 13 ===
Harashima with the help of Hirano and Igarashi engineer a plan to take down Domoto who turns-out working with Mayako's father, Mizukoshi in-order to get rid of Harashima, to bring them down and expose their dirt. Harashima and Kaori also grew their relationship and reconcile. The two then spending their time together and Harashima ask Kaori to stay by his side no matter what happen which Kaori without a doubt agree. However Domoto's who is now in-charge of Harashima Enterprise then rush to demolish the apartment and using thugs to evict the Apartment, including Kaori and Misao room. While protecting Misao from Domoto's thugs, Konosuke accidentally injured one of the thugs and was arrested by police. Konosuke who is now imprison, leaving Shinpei alone but was taking under the care of Kaori and Misao. However Harashima later bail Konosuke out of prison and admit to Konosuke and his entourage that after spending time with Konosuke, Kaori and their entourage, Harashima realize something meaningful in this life and in-return will make an amend, by giving something that will benefit them.

=== Episode 14 ===
Harashima with the help of Hirano and Igarashi and Mayako finally managed to retrieve the file which contain all the dirt of his company which implicate Domoto and Mayako's father, Mizukoshi, about the corruption practice between people within Harashima Enterprise, which include Harashima himself and Domoto, and Mizukoshi. Harashima, Domoto and Mizukoshi later-on arrested by the authority. However Harashima was released early after agree to cooperate with the authority in-order to expose the corruption scheme. After being release from Prison, Harashima was waited by none other than, Kaori, Konosuke, Misao, Hirano, Igarashi and along with all of Konosuke friend who's now change their perception towards Harashima and apologize for misjudging Harashima. Harashima also learn that he is now not alone and although he only had three months to live, he still had friend who is willing to stay by his side, even when he is in trouble.

=== Epilogue ===
Konosuke finally agreed to propose Misao and the two decided to get married. Harashima offer Konosuke to held the wedding at his Villa and ask Konosuke, Kaori, Misao, Shinpei and all of their friends to spend their time together in his Villa in-order to get some more happiness and joyness in-which Konosuke undoubtedly agreed. They all having so much fun and joyness at Konosuke's wedding that was held in Harashima's Villa. There Kaori also admit to Harashima that she never regret no matter what happen for getting to know Harashima and fall-in love with him which Harashima also express the same feeling towards Kaori. In the climax it is revealed that Harashima finally succumb to his illness and a year has passed since Harashima died, Kaori, Konosuke, Misao, Shinpei, now also accompany by Mayako and all of Konosuke's friend spending their time again in Harashima Villa which turns out was inherited to Kaori and Konosuke and was use by all of them for once a year gathering in the date where Harashima died.

== Issues in A Story of Love ==
- Poverty in developed countries
- Class barriers in Tokyo
- Homelessness
- Debts and money problems
- Illegal dealings with money
- Death/loss
- Cancer/premature death
- Unemployment
- Arranged marriage
- Inter-class marriage/romance/affairs
