= Hiroyuki Sanada =

Japanese actor (born 1960)

- 真田 広之
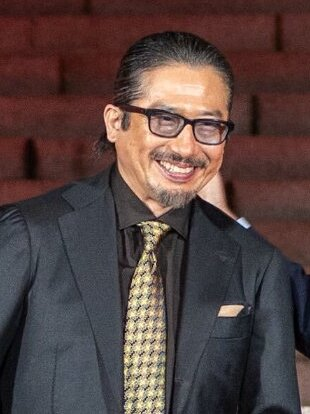
- Sanada in 2024
- Born: Hiroyuki Shimozawa (下澤 廣之); 12 October 1960 (age 66); Shinagawa, Tokyo, Japan
- Occupations: Actor, martial artist
- Years active: 1965–present
- Spouse: Satomi Tezuka (m. 1990; div. 1997)
- Children: 2
- Awards: See list

Japanese name
- Kanji: 真田 広之
- Hiragana: さなだ ひろゆき
- Katakana: サナダ ヒロユキ
Transcriptions
- Romanization: Sanada Hiroyuki

Alternative Japanese name
- Kanji: 下澤 廣之
Transcriptions
- Romanization: Shimozawa Hiroyuki
- Martial arts career
- Rank: 1st Dan–Karate

Hiroyuki Sanada (Japanese: 真田 広之; né Shimozawa; born 12 October 1960) is a Japanese actor and martial artist. He has received numerous accolades, including a Golden Globe Award, two Primetime Emmy Awards, a British Academy Television Award, a Japan Academy Film Prize, two Hochi Film Awards, a Mainichi Film Award, three Blue Ribbon Awards for Best Actor, four Kinema Junpo Awards, and honors from the Yokohama Film Festival. In 2018, he received the Medal of Honor with Purple Ribbon from the Japanese government for his "artistic developments, improvements, and accomplishments", and in 2025, Time named him one of the 100 most influential people in the world.

Sanada began his career in the mid-1960s at the age of five, and was the protégé of actor Sonny Chiba. A black belt in Kyokushin karate, he initially gained prominence for his roles in Japanese and Hong Kong action films, later establishing himself as a dramatic actor. He is best known to international audiences for his roles as Ryuji Takayama in Ring (1998) where he played alongside Nanako Matsushima, who was also his co-star in a 1997 television drama A Story of Love. His role as the Fool in a production of the Shakespeare play King Lear (1999–2000) gave him theatrical attention, and led to his appointment as an Honorary Member of the Order of the British Empire in 2002. Beginning in the 2000s, Sanada grew his Hollywood presence with such roles as Seibei Iguchi in The Twilight Samurai (2002), Ujio in The Last Samurai (2003), and Kenji in Rush Hour 3 (2007).

Sanada's appearances in Hollywood films include Sunshine (2007), Speed Racer (2008), The Wolverine, 47 Ronin (both 2013), Minions (2015), Life (2017), Avengers: Endgame (2019), Army of the Dead (2021), as Hanzo Hasashi / Scorpion in Mortal Kombat (2021), Bullet Train (2022), and John Wick: Chapter 4 (2023). He also had roles on Lost (2010) and the HBO series Westworld (2018–2020). Sanada gained awards for his role in the FX historical drama series Shōgun (2024) as Yoshii Toranaga, a fictionalized version of Tokugawa Ieyasu.

== Life and career ==
=== 1966–1978: Child actor ===
Born in Tokyo, Sanada was scouted by an entertainer while playing with the son of the actor Kokichi Takada who lived in the same condominium. After working as a model for a magazine for young children, he joined the Himawari Theatre Group at the age of five. Originally planning to be an action movie star, he studied Shorinji Kempo and later took up Kyokushin kaikan karate. He began playing baseball at age 8 as a catcher. Sanada was mentored by actor Shinichi "Sonny" Chiba, and was a member of his Japan Action Club (JAC), becoming his protégé.

At the age of five, Sanada had his first role in the 1966 film Game of Chance (浪曲子守唄) as the son of Chiba's character. He had several roles in Japanese television and films, but quit temporarily so he could focus on living a normal childhood. He said this gave him "a good chance to watch movies as the audience", helping his perspective. By his teenage years he knew how to act, fight, sing, dance, perform stunts, ride horseback, and had developed versatility. Sanada had noticed that many popular actors would develop such skills, and felt it was "the best service for the audience" to do so himself before he practised acting again. He gained attention for his dangerous stunt of jumping from a helicopter in the 1979 film G.I. Samurai, action directed by Sonny Chiba. In 1981, he appeared in the smash-hit movie Samurai Reincarnation directed by Kinji Fukasaku, in which he played an iga-ryū ninja.

=== 1982–1999: Japanese character roles ===
Sanada received a Bachelor of Arts degree in Film Science from Nihon University in 1982. In 1984, Sanada starred with Sonny Chiba and an 80's "idol" Hiroko Yakushimaru in Legend of the Eight Samurai, which became the number one film in Japan, earning ¥2.3 billion, and was later released in foreign language versions. This film established Sanada as a popular action star in Japan. In 1992, Sanada played Yoshinari, a stockbroker turned yakuza in the comedy film Keisho Sakazuki (Succession), with Ogata Ken. In 1997 Sanada starred in a television drama A Story of Love, also known by its Japanese title Konna Koi no Hanashi, where he played the role of Shuichiro Harashima, a wealthy but lonely upper-class businessman who falls in love with a decorating designer from a lower-class family played by Nanako Matsushima. The following year in 1998, Sanada once again co-starred with Nanako Matsushima in the mystery thriller Ringu (Ring) as Takayama Ryuji, the ex-husband of Matsushima's character Reiko, a journalist investigating the death of her niece. Also in 1998, Sanada starred as Asami in Jun Ichikawa's Tadon to Chikuwa. Sanada's role followed the story of a writer suffering from writer's block. In 1999, Sanada starred in Mayonaka Made (Round About Midnight) as Moriyama Koji, a confident jazz trumpet performer who performs at a club called Cotton Tail. In the film, Moriyama sees Michelle Reis's character being attacked by two murderers, who they proceed to chase throughout the film.

=== 1999–2002: Royal Shakespeare Company ===
In 1999 and 2000, he performed with the Royal Shakespeare Company (RSC) in their production of King Lear, as The Fool. Producer Nigel Hawthorne personally invited Sanada to play the role, yet Sanada had doubts since he had not taken an English-language role before. Sanada was convinced after the producers assured him that he was "an actor first before [being] Japanese or Asian". For this role, he was appointed an Honorary Member of the Order of the British Empire (MBE) in 2002, citing his "contribution to spreading British culture in Japan." That year, Sanada played the lead role of the low-ranking Seibei Iguchi in The Twilight Samurai. It follows the turbulent life and times of the character, and documents the financial woes that a 19th-century Japanese warrior could have faced.

=== 2003–2009: The Last Samurai and international breakthrough ===
In 2003, Sanada's role as Ujio, a master swordsman, opposite Tom Cruise in The Last Samurai, brought him praise. Sanada played Matsuda, a man who befriends Ralph Fiennes' character Todd Jackson, in The White Countess (2005) directed by James Ivory. He starred in the Chinese film The Promise directed by Chen Kaige as General Guangming. Sanada appeared in Rush Hour 3 (2007) with Jackie Chan and Chris Tucker, Danny Boyle's Sunshine (2007) as Kaneda, and The City of Your Final Destination (2009), in which he plays Pete, the younger lover of Anthony Hopkins's character Adam Gund.

=== 2010–2020: Lost, Westworld, and Avengers: Endgame ===
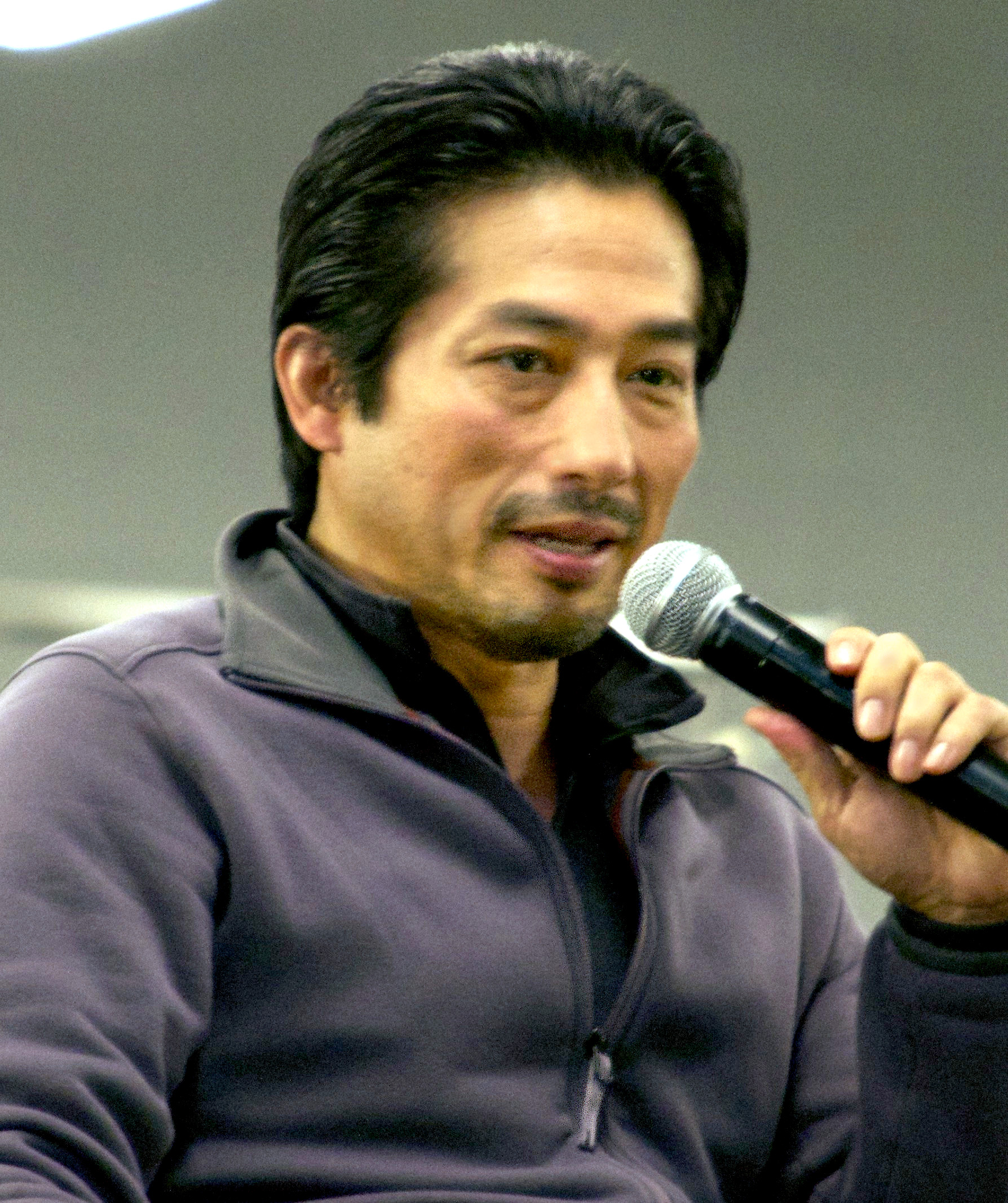
Sanada on a press tour for the series Helix (2013)

Sanada joined the cast of the ABC TV series Lost in 2010 during its sixth and final season. He portrayed Dogen, a high-ranking member of "The Others". In 2013, he appeared in 47 Ronin (the first English-language adaptation of the Chushingura legend, Japan's most famous tale of samurai loyalty and revenge) alongside Keanu Reeves, as Shingen Yashida in The Wolverine opposite Hugh Jackman, and as Takashi Nagase in The Railway Man, a story of vengeance and reconciliation co-starring Stellan Skarsgård and Colin Firth. He voiced "Sumo Villain" in Minions, a master of strength and power who pursues the Minions.

Sanada was a guest star as Takehaya, a former Japanese Navy officer and legendary pirate captain in post-plague Asia, in the apocalyptic drama series The Last Ship. He also starred in the 2017 movie Life with Jake Gyllenhaal, Rebecca Ferguson, and Ryan Reynolds. In 2018, he began a recurring role as swordmaster Musashi on the HBO series Westworld and played the minor role of Akihiko in the 2019 film Avengers: Endgame. That year, he received the Medal of Honor with Purple Ribbon from the Japanese government for his "artistic developments, improvements, and accomplishments" In August 2019, Sanada was cast in the Mortal Kombat reboot as Scorpion. In 2020, Sanada starred alongside Johnny Depp in the film Minamata. In 2021, he played the shrewd casino owner Bly Tanaka in Zack Snyder's action film Army of the Dead.

=== 2021–present: Bullet Train, John Wick: Chapter 4, Shōgun ===
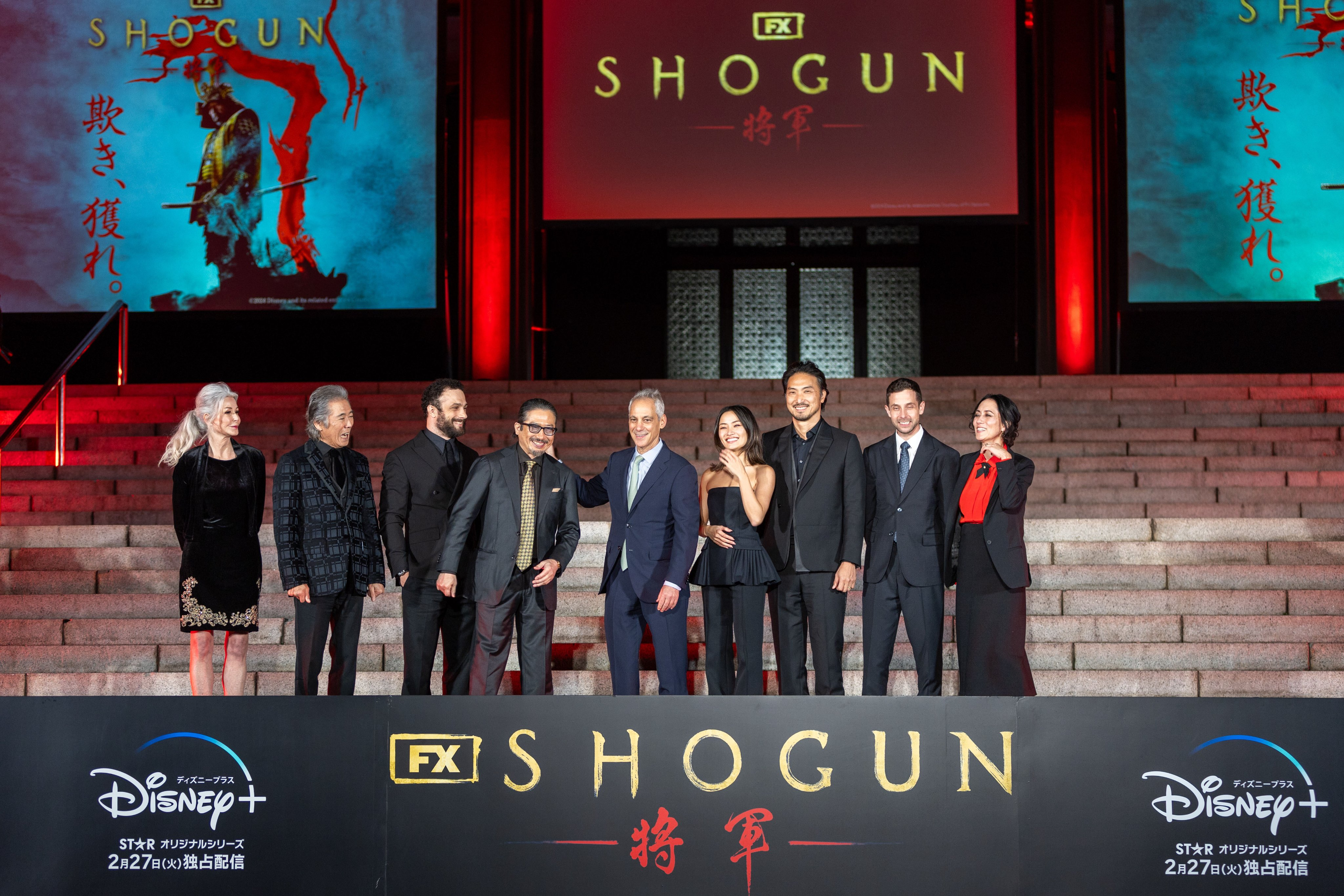
Sanada (fourth from the left) at an event promoting Shōgun in 2024

In 2022, Sanada took the major supporting role of the Elder in Bullet Train opposite Brad Pitt. In 2023, he portrayed Koji Shimazu, manager of the Osaka Continental Hotel, in John Wick: Chapter 4, and was featured in a multi-commercial campaign introducing Mazda CX-90.

In 2021, Sanada was announced as producer and part of the cast of the FX limited series Shōgun, adapted from the James Clavell novel, playing the part of Lord Toranaga. The series has received widespread global critical acclaim, with Sanada's role in the series considered a highlight among many reviewers. In 2024, Sanada became the first Japanese actor or actress to win any Primetime Emmy, and specifically the first Japanese winner of the Primetime Emmy Award for Outstanding Lead Actor in a Drama Series, for his role in Shōgun. Sanada also was a recipient of the Primetime Emmy for Outstanding Drama Series for his role as a producer for the series. Sanada received the inaugural award for best TV series performance at the EnergaCamerimage International Film Festival for the role. He was nominated for the Gotham TV Award for Outstanding Performance in a Limited Series, and the Television Critics Association Award for Individual Achievement in Drama. Sanada won the prize for Best Actor – Television Series Drama at the 82nd Golden Globe Awards, and received the Critics' Choice Television Award for Best Actor in a Drama Series for the role. In 2025, Time magazine named him one of the 100 most influential people in the world.

== Personal life ==
In 1990, Sanada married actress Satomi Tezuka and had two sons, including the actor Nichinan Tezuka. They divorced in 1997 after he had an affair with a younger actress, Riona Hazuki, with whom he had starred in a film. Tezuka took custody of their sons.

== Honors ==
- Time 100 listee (United States, 2025)
- Medal of Honor with Purple Ribbon (Japan, 2018)
- Honorary Member of the Order of the British Empire (United Kingdom, 2002)

== Performances ==
=== Films ===
Year	Title	Role	Director(s)	Notes	Ref.
1966	Game of Chance (浪曲子守唄)	Kenichi Endō	Ryūichi Takamori (鷹森立一)		
1967	Game of Chance 2 (続 浪曲子守唄)	Kenichi Endō	Ryūichi Takamori (鷹森立一)		
1967	Game of Chance 3: Lullaby for My Son (出世子守唄)	Kenichi Endō	Ryūichi Takamori (鷹森立一)		
1969	Abashiri Prison: Drifter at the Edge of the World (新網走番外地 さいはての流れ者)	Shōichi	Teruo Ishii (石井輝男)		
1970	Legacy of Honor (遊侠列伝)	Ichiro Kawamata	Shigehiro Ozawa (小沢 茂弘)		
1970	Brutal Tales of Chivalry 7 (昭和残侠伝 死んで貰います)	Yasuo Hanada	Masahiro Makino (マキノ雅弘)		
1974	The Executioner (直撃! 地獄拳)	Young Ryūichi Kōga	Teruo Ishii (石井輝男)		
1978	Shogun's Samurai (柳生一族の陰謀)	Hayate	Kinji Fukasaku (深作欣二)		
1978	Message from Space (宇宙からのメッセージ)	Shirō Hongō	Kinji Fukasaku (深作欣二)		
1979	Sanada Yukimura no Bōryaku (真田幸村の謀略)	Isa Nyūdō Miyoshi	Sadao Nakajima (中島貞夫)		
1979	G.I. Samurai (戦国自衛隊)	Takeda Katsuyori	Kōsei Saitō (斎藤光正)		
1979	Tonda Couple (翔んだカップル)	Hoshida	Shinji Sōmai (相米慎二)		
1979	Shogun's Ninja (忍者武芸帖 百地三太夫)	Takamaru Momochi	Norifumi Suzuki (鈴木則文)		
1981	Samurai Reincarnation (魔界転生)	Iga no Kirimaru	Kinji Fukasaku (深作欣二)		
1981	Roaring Fire (吼えろ鉄拳)	Jōji Hibiki/Tōru Hinohara	Norifumi Suzuki (鈴木則文)		
1981	The Kamikaze Adventurer (冒険者カミカゼ -ADVENTURER KAMIKAZE-)	Akira Hoshino	Ryūichi Takamori (鷹森立一)		
1981	The Blazing Valiant (燃える勇者)	Joe	Toru Dobashi (土橋亨)		
1982	Lovers Lost (道頓堀川)	Kunihiko Yasuoka	Kinji Fukasaku (深作欣二)		
1982	Ninja in the Dragon's Den (龍之忍者)	Genbu	Corey Yuen (元奎)		
1982	Fall Guy (蒲田行進曲)	Himself	Kinji Fukasaku (深作欣二)	Cameo appearance	
1982	Ninja Wars (伊賀忍法帖)	Jōtarō	Kōsei Saitō (斎藤光正)		
1983	Kabamaru the Ninja (伊賀野カバ丸)	Shizune Mejiro	Norifumi Suzuki (鈴木則文)		
1983	Legend of the Eight Samurai (里見八犬伝)	Shinbei Inue	Kinji Fukasaku (深作欣二)		
1984	The Street of Desire (彩り河)	Jōji Tanaka	Haruhiko Mimura (三村晴彦)		
1984	Kōtarō Makaritōru! (コータローまかりとおる！)	Tatsuya Yoshioka	Norifumi Suzuki (鈴木則文)		
1984	Mahjong hōrōki (麻雀放浪記)	Tetsu Bōya	Makoto Wada (和田誠)		
1985	The Dagger of Kamui (カムイの剣)	Jiro (voice)	Rintaro (りんたろう)		
1986	House on Fire (火宅の人)	Chūya Nakahara	Kinji Fukasaku (深作欣二)		
1986	Inuji ni Seshi Mono (犬死にせしもの)	Shigesa	Kazuyuki Izutsu (井筒和幸)		
1986	Cabaret (キャバレー)	Tanokura	Haruki Kadokawa (角川春樹)		
1986	In the Line of Duty: Royal Warriors (皇家戰士)	Kenji "Peter" Yamamoto	David Chung (鍾志文)		
1987	Sure Death 4: Revenge (必殺IV 恨みはらします)	Ukyōnosuke Okuda	Kinji Fukasaku (深作欣二)		
1988	Kaitō Ruby (快盗ルビイ)	Tōru Hayashi	Makoto Wada (和田誠)		
1989	Who Do I Choose? (どっちにするの。)	Jun Yamamoto	Shusuke Kaneko (金子修介)		
1990	Yellow Fangs (リメインズ_美しき勇者たち)	Eiji	Sonny Chiba (千葉真一)		
1990	Let's Go to the Hospital (病院へ行こう)	Kōhei Shintani	Yōjirō Takita (滝田洋二郎)		
1990	Tsugumi (つぐみ)	Kyōichi	Jun Ichikawa (市川準)		
1992	Succession (継承盃)	Masakazu Yoshinari	Kazuki Ōmori (大森一樹)		
1992	Let's Go to the Hospital 2 (病は気から 病院へ行こう2)	Ichirō Katakura	Yōjirō Takita (滝田洋二郎)		
1993	We Are Not Alone (僕らはみんな生きている)	Keiichi Takahashi	Yōjirō Takita (滝田洋二郎)		
1993	Nemuranai Machi: Shinjuku Same (眠らない街 新宿鮫)	Takashi Samejima	Yōjirō Takita (滝田洋二郎)		
1994	Uneasy Encounters (怖がる人々)	Man	Makoto Wada (和田誠)	Anthology film	
1994	Hero Interview (ヒーローインタビュー)	Jinta Todoroki	Michio Mitsuno (光野道夫)		
1994	Crest of Betrayal (忠臣蔵外伝 四谷怪談)	Takumi-no-kami Asano	Kinji Fukasaku (深作欣二)	Special appearance	
1994	119 (119)	Headquarters member	Naoto Takenaka (竹中直人)		
1995	Sharaku (写楽)	Tonbo	Masahiro Shinoda (篠田正浩)		
1995	East Meets West	Kenkichi Kamijō	Kihachi Okamoto (岡本喜八)		
1995	Emergency Call (緊急呼出し エマージェンシー・コール)	Hideyuki Harada	Kazuki Ōmori (大森一樹)		
1998	Ring (リング)	Ryūji Takayama	Hideo Nakata (中田秀夫)		
1998	Spiral (らせん)	Ryūji Takayama	George Iida (飯田譲治)		
1998	Murder on D Street (D坂の殺人事件)	Seiichirō Fukiya	Akio Jissoji (実相寺昭雄)		
1998	Tadon to Chikuwa (たどんとちくわ)	Asami	Jun Ichikawa (市川準)		
1999	Ring 2 (リング2)	Ryūji Takayama	Hideo Nakata (中田秀夫)	Special appearance	
2000	First Love (はつ恋)	Shinichirō Fujiki	Tetsuo Shinohara (篠原哲雄)		
2001	Minna no Ie (みんなのいえ)	Bartender	Kōki Mitani (三谷幸喜)		
2001	Round About Midnight (真夜中まで)	Kōji Moriyama	Makoto Wada (和田誠)		
2001	Onmyōji (陰陽師)	Dōson	Yōjirō Takita (滝田洋二郎)		
2002	Vengeance for Sale (助太刀屋助六)	Sukeroku Sukedachiya	Kihachi Okamoto (岡本喜八)		
2002	The Twilight Samurai (たそがれ清兵衛)	Seibei Iguchi	Yoji Yamada (山田洋次)		
2003	The Last Samurai	Ujio	Edward Zwick		
2005	Aegis (亡国のイージス)	Hisashi Sengoku	Junji Sakamoto (阪本順治)		
2005	The White Countess	Matsuda	James Ivory		
2005	The Promise (無極)	General Guangming	Chen Kaige (陳凱歌)		
2007	Sunshine	Kaneda	Danny Boyle		
2007	Rush Hour 3	Kenji	Brett Ratner		
2008	Speed Racer	Mr. Musha	The Wachowskis		
2009	The City of Your Final Destination	Pete	James Ivory		
2012	Tenchi: The Samurai Astronomer (天地明察)	Narrator	Yōjirō Takita (滝田洋二郎)		
2013	The Wolverine	Shingen Yashida	James Mangold		
2013	The Railway Man	Takashi Nagase	Jonathan Teplitzky		
2013	47 Ronin	Ōishi Yoshio	Carl Rinsch		
2015	Mr. Holmes	Tamiki Umezaki	Bill Condon		
2015	Minions	Dumo the Sumo (voice)	Pierre Coffin and Kyle Balda		
2017	Life	Sho Murakami	Daniel Espinosa		
2018	The Catcher Was a Spy	Kawabata	Ben Lewin		
2019	Avengers: Endgame	Akihiko	Russo brothers		
2020	Minamata	Mitsuo Yamazaki	Andrew Levitas		
2021	Mortal Kombat	Hanzo Hasashi / Scorpion	Simon McQuoid		
2021	Army of the Dead	Bly Tanaka	Zack Snyder		
2022	Bullet Train	The Elder	David Leitch		
2023	John Wick: Chapter 4	Shimazu Koji	Chad Stahelski		
2026	Mortal Kombat II	Hanzo Hasashi / Scorpion	Simon McQuoid		

=== Television ===
Year	Title	Role(s)	Notes	Ref.
1966	Freezing Point (氷点)		2 episodes	
1966	JNR Inspector No. 36 (鉄道公安36号)		2 episodes	
1967	Special Tactical Police (特別機動捜査隊)		1 episode	
1968–69	Ahirugaoka 77 (あひるヶ丘77)	Tahei Danno		
1970	Mito Kōmon (水戸黄門)	Kanta	1 episode	
1970–73	Key Hunter (キイハンター)		3 episodes	
1975	The Gorilla Seven (ザ★ゴリラ7)		1 episode	
1977	J.A.K.Q. Dengekitai (ジャッカー電撃隊)	Katsuya Nakayama	1 episode	
1977	Shinkansen Kōankan (新幹線公安官)	Yasuo	1 episode	
1978–79	Message from Space: Galactic Wars (宇宙からのメッセージ・銀河大戦)	Hayato Gen/Maboroshi	27 episodes	
1978–79	The Yagyu Conspiracy (柳生一族の陰謀)	Hyōma Hattori; Sasuke	13 episodes	
1978	Seven Detectives (七人の刑事)		1 episode	
1979	The Unfettered Shogun (吉宗評判記 暴れん坊将軍)	Otome Moroki	1 episode	
1980	Roar! Doberman Cop (爆走！ドーベルマン刑事)	Hiroshi Sawaki	1 episode	
1980–81	Yagyu Abaretabi (柳生あばれ旅)	Matahei	10 episodes	
1981–82	Shadow Warriors II (影の軍団II)	Hayate Kozō	10 episodes	
1982	Shadow Warriors III (影の軍団III)	Sasuke	13 episodes	
1982–83	Yagyu Jubei Abaretabi (柳生十兵衛あばれ旅)	Matahei	9 episodes	
1984	Wonderful Circus Guy (素晴らしきサーカス野郎)	Tsuyoshi Satomi	TV film	
1984	Chōdenshi Bioman (超電子バイオマン)	Ken Hayase	1 episode	
1985	Shadow Warriors IV (影の軍団IV)	Katsu Rintarō	18 episodes	
1985	And Then the War is Over (そして戦争が終った)	Tetsutarō Suzuki	TV film	
1985	Kamen no Ninja Akakage (仮面の忍者赤影)	Genji	TV film	
1985	Shadow Warriors: The End of An Era (影の軍団 幕末編)	Katsu Rintarō	3 episodes	
1986	Interviewer Saeko: A Returnless Journey (インタビュアー・冴子 〜もどらない旅へ〜)		TV film	
1987	Classmate is 13-years-old (同級生は13歳)	Kenkō Inawashiro		
1987	Dokuganryu Masamune (独眼竜政宗)	Matsudaira Tadateru	9 episodes	
1987	Sweet Memories (松田聖子のスイート・メモリーズ)	Kiyoshi Ishihara	TV film	
1987	Me and Sister (俺と姉貴)		TV film	
1988	Tokugawa Ieyasu (徳川家康)	Ishida Mitsunari	TV film	
1988	Love Story in New York (ニューヨーク恋物語)	Masahiro Sakairi		
1988	I Love You So Much (あなたが大好き)	Seiichi	TV film	
1989	Oda Nobunaga (織田信長)	Tokugawa Ieyasu	TV film	
1989	Sakamoto Ryoma (坂本龍馬)	Sakamoto Ryōma	TV film	
1990	Shingo's Ten Duels (新吾十番勝負)	Aoi Shingo	TV film	
1991	Taiheiki (太平記)	Ashikaga Takauji	49 episodes	
1991	Fall Guy: Gin-chan Goes (続・蒲田行進曲 銀ちゃんが行く)		TV film	
1992	Seiteki Mokushi Roku (性的黙示録)	Mitsuo Wada	TV film	
1992	Seizoroi Shimizu Ikka: Jirocho Uridasu (勢揃い清水一家 次郎長売り出す)	Shinya no Asakichi	TV film	
1993	Hideyoshi Toyotomi, Conqueror of a Nation (天下を獲った男 豊臣秀吉)	Azai Nagamasa	TV film	
1993	Kōkō Kyōshi (高校教師)	Takao Hamura	11 episodes	
1994	The Reason I Owed to Her (僕が彼女に、借金をした理由。)	Kunihiko Yamanobe	11 episodes	
1995	The Abe Clan (阿部一族)	Matashichirō Emoto	TV film	
1995	Miracles in the Holy Night: Santa Claus is Coming to Town (聖夜の奇跡 聖者が街にやってくる -Santa Claus is Coming to town-」)	Yūji Nonomura	TV film	
1996	Hideyoshi (秀吉)	Ishida Mitsunari		
1997	Shin Hanshichi Torimonocho (新・半七捕物帳)	Hanshichi	18 episodes	
1997	A Story of Love (こんな恋のはなし)	Shūichirō Harashima	12 episodes	
1998	That Man's Fear (その男の恐怖)	Keisuke Kishikawa	TV film	
1998	Tabloid (タブロイド)	Toshihito Manabe	10 episodes	
1999	Summer of Detectives (刑事たちの夏)	Kazuki Kurokawa	TV film	
1999	Furuhata Ninzaburō (古畑任三郎)	Kazuo Yura	1 episode	
1999	Kujira o Mita hi (鯨を見た日)	Tamio Ōba	TV film	
2001	Unmarried Family (非婚家族)	Yōsuke Matoba	12 episodes	
2004	Locked-in Syndrome (ロックド・イン症候群)	Shunsuke Kōsaka	TV film	
2010	Lost	Dogen	5 episodes	
2011–12	Revenge	Satoshi Takeda	4 episodes	
2014–15	Helix	Dr. Hiroshi Hatake	15 episodes	
2014	Extant	Hideki Yasumoto	13 episodes	
2016	The Last Ship	Takehaya	9 episodes	
2018–20	Westworld	Musashi / Dolores "Sato" Abernathy	4 episodes	
2021	Hawkeye	Akihiko	1 episode (archive footage)	
2024–present	Shōgun	Yoshii Toranaga	Executive Producer (season two)	

=== Stage appearances ===
Year	Title	Role	Notes
1981	Yagyu Jubei Makai Tensho	Iga no Kirimaru	
1981	Stuntman Story	Hiroyuki	
1982–84	The Big Adventure of The Fantastic Pirates	Icarus (Young Pirate)/Eagle Spirit	
1984	Little Shop of Horrors	Seymour Krelborn	
1985	The Drunken Duke	Napoleon Bonaparte	
1985	Tenshu Story		
1986	Adventure Youth Departure		
1986	Stuntman Love Story		
1986	Romeo and Juliet	Romeo	
1987	Biloxi Blues	Eugene	
1988	Big River	Huckleberry	
1989–90	Broadway Bound	Eugene	
1993	Moonlit Club		
1995–98	Hamlet	Hamlet	
1999–2000	King Lear	The Fool	
2000	The Orchestra Pit	Conductor	

== Accolades ==
Institution	Year	Category	Work	Result	Ref.
Astra TV Awards	2024	Best Actor in a Streaming Drama Series	Shōgun	Won	
Blue Ribbon Awards	1993	Best Actor	We Are Not Alone	Won	
Blue Ribbon Awards	1995	Best Actor	Sharaku; East Meets West; Kinkyu yobidashi - Emâjenshî kôru	Won	
Blue Ribbon Awards	2005	Best Actor	Aegis	Won	
British Academy Television Awards	2025	Best International Programme (as producer)	Shōgun	Won	
Camerimage	2024	Best Performance in a TV Series	Shōgun	Won	
Critics' Choice Television Awards	2025	Best Actor in a Drama Series	Shōgun	Won	
Golden Globe Awards	2025	Best Actor – Television Series Drama	Shōgun	Won	
Gotham TV Awards	2024	Outstanding Performance in a Limited Series	Shōgun	Nominated	
Hochi Film Awards	1988	Best Actor	Kaitō Ruby	Won	
Hochi Film Awards	1995	Best Actor	Sharaku; East Meets West; Kinkyu yobidashi - Emâjenshî kôru	Won	
Japan Academy Film Prize	1982	Newcomer of the Year	Samurai Reincarnation; Roaring Fire; Bôkensha kamikaze	Nominated	
Japan Academy Film Prize	1985	Outstanding Performance by an Actor in a Leading Role	Mahjong hōrōki The Street of Desire; Legend of the Eight Samurai	Nominated	
Japan Academy Film Prize	1991	Outstanding Performance by an Actor in a Leading Role	Tugumi; Byôin e ikô Rimeinzu: Utsukushiki yuusha-tachi	Nominated	
Japan Academy Film Prize	1994	Outstanding Performance by an Actor in a Leading Role	Nemuranai Machi: Shinjuku Same; We Are Not Alone	Nominated	
Japan Academy Film Prize	2003	Outstanding Performance by an Actor in a Leading Role	The Twilight Samurai	Won	
Japan Academy Film Prize	2006	Outstanding Performance by an Actor in a Leading Role	Aegis	Nominated	
Kinema Junpo Awards	1989	Best Actor	Kaitō Ruby	Won	
Kinema Junpo Awards	1994	Best Actor	Nemuranai Machi: Shinjuku Same We Are Not Alone	Won	
Kinema Junpo Awards	1996	Best Actor	Sharaku; East Meets West; Kinkyu yobidashi - Emâjenshî kôru	Won	
Kinema Junpo Awards	2003	Best Actor	The Twilight Samurai; Vengeance for Sale	Won	
Mainichi Film Awards	2003	Best Actor	The Twilight Samurai; Vengeance for Sale	Won	
Primetime Emmy Awards	2024	Outstanding Drama Series	Shōgun	Won	
Primetime Emmy Awards	2024	Outstanding Lead Actor in a Drama Series	Shōgun	Won	
Television Critics Association Awards	2024	Individual Achievement in Drama	Shōgun	Nominated	
TV Life Annual Drama Awards	1994	Best Actor	High School Teacher	Won	
Yokohama Film Festival	1989	Best Actor	Kaitō Ruby	Won	
Yokohama Film Festival	1994	Best Actor	Nemuranai Machi: Shinjuku Same; We Are Not Alone; Yamai wa kikara: Byôin e ikô 2	Won	

== Sources ==
- Nagano, Tatsuji; Sano, Tōru, others (2023). Fujimoto, Kōichi (ed.). アクション映画大解剖―見る者を飽きさせないスリルと興奮! [A Comprehensive Dissection of Action Movies: Thrills and Excitement that will Never Bore the Viewer!]. Movie Dissection Series Vol.7 (in Japanese). San-ei Shobo. ISBN 978-4-7796-4850-2.
