= Poison: Iitai Koto mo Ienai Konna Yo no Naka wa =

1998 single by Takashi Sorimachi

- 1998 single cover

Single by Takashi Sorimachi

from the album High Life
- Language: Japanese
- B-side: "If You Love Me, Don't Forget Me"
- Released: July 29, 1998
- Genre: Rock; J-pop
- Length: 4:05
- Label: Mercury Music Entertainment
- Composer: Jinjirō Inoue
- Lyricist: Takashi Sorimachi
- Producer: Ken Yoshida

Takashi Sorimachi singles chronology
"One" (1998)	"Poison: Iitai Koto mo Ienai Konna Yo no Naka wa" (1998)	"Free" (2000)

Movie Mix cover

Audio
- "Poison: Iitai Koto mo Ienai Konna Yo no Naka wa" on YouTube

"Poison: Iitai Koto mo Ienai Konna Yo no Naka wa" (Japanese: POISON 〜言いたい事も言えないこんな世の中は〜; lit. "Poison: In This World You Don't Say What You Want to Say") (Note: Also known as "Poison: Iitai Koto mo Ienai Konna Yo no Naka ja" (Japanese: POISON 〜言いたい事も言えないこんな世の中じゃ〜).) is a song by Japanese actor and singer Takashi Sorimachi from his second studio album, High Life (1998). It was written as the main theme to the drama series GTO, starring Sorimachi as the schoolteacher Eikichi Onizuka. Produced by Ken Yoshida and composed by Jinjirō Inoue with Sorimachi in charge of lyrics and vocals, "Poison" is a rock and J-pop track written in E major with an allegro tempo. The song was released as Sorimachi's fourth single on July 29, 1998, carrying the Mercury Music Entertainment label.

Upon release, "Poison" entered at No. 9 on Oricon's Singles Chart, and went on to chart in the top 20 for nine weeks. By the end of 1998, the single had surpassed 250,000 sales, taking No. 88 on Oricon's year-end chart and earning a Gold certification from the Recording Industry Association of Japan (RIAJ). A renewed single, titled the Movie Mix, was released on December 18, 1999, and peaked at No. 38 on Oricon's chart.

Post-release, "Poison" has appeared alongside various GTO projects and has been called representative of Sorimachi. In 2018, the song became an Internet phenomenon for its ability to soothe crying babies, attributed by academics to a rise and fall of a sound in the song, particularly during a guitar riff in the intro. This renewed attention caused the song to debut at No. 38 on Billboard Japan's Hot 100 chart, established in 2008. "Poison" has received two subsequent Gold certifications from the RIAJ: one in 2014 for 100,000 digital downloads, and another in 2023 for 50 million streams.

== Composition and release ==
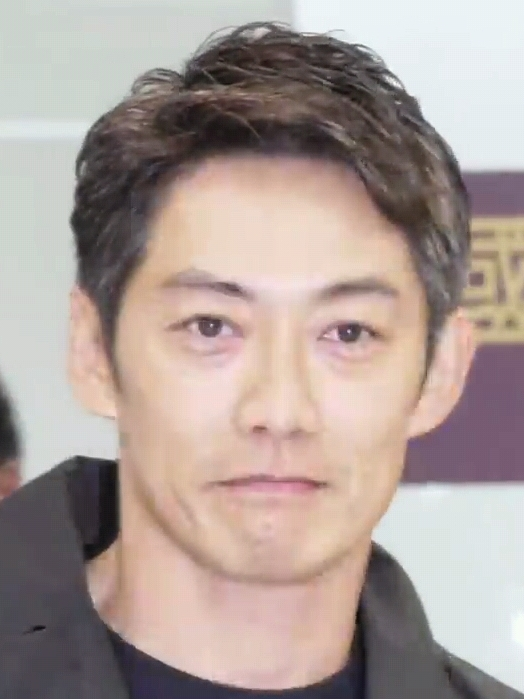
Takashi Sorimachi in 2019

"Poison: Iitai Koto mo Ienai Konna Yo no Naka wa" is a Japanese rock and pop song that lasts for 4 minutes and 5 seconds, composed in E major with an allegro tempo of 138 beats per minute, according to sheet music from Doremi Music Publishing. It opens with an instrumental intro, featuring a continuously rising and falling guitar riff. In the verse and chorus, the song lays mostly flat with high melody range. Vocals remain deep throughout the entire song.

The song was written by Takashi Sorimachi as the main theme to the 1998 television drama GTO, in which Sorimachi also stars in the lead role as the perverted but well-intent schoolteacher Eikichi Onizuka. Writing the song, Sorimachi thought back to his own time as a student, basing the lyrics in the feelings he remembered holding towards adults and society at that time. The song was produced and arranged by Ken Yoshida from composition by Jinjirō Inoue; Sorimachi was in charge of lyrics and vocals.

"Poison" was released as an 8 cm CD single on July 29, 1998, through Mercury Music Entertainment. It is Sorimachi's fourth single overall, and the second single from his second studio album, High Life. A renewed maxi single, titled the Movie Mix, was released on December 18, 1999. It included a remake of the song created for the 1999 GTO film and a drum and bass remix entitled "Poison 2000". Despite its popularity, "Poison" would be one of Sorimachi's final singles, followed only by "Free" in 2000.

== Reception ==
=== Critical reception ===
A comment for CDJournal described "Poison" as a song that "cheers for a man who keeps fighting without deceiving himself." The site's review for the Movie Mix wrote that the chorus will possibly move many listeners to tears, calling the single an item of interest for fans. The Movie Mix review also directed praise to "Poison 2000", opining that "Poison" in a drum and bass style was "surprisingly cool."

=== Commercial performance ===
"Poison" debuted on the weekly Oricon chart dated August 10, 1998, with 48,640 CD sales, placing at No. 9, its peak position. The single spent nine weeks in the top 20 of the chart, and in total charted for twelve weeks. When it left the chart in October, it had reached 270,010 sales, earning it a Gold certification from the RIAJ for surprassing 200,000, (Note: Per the RIAJ's pre-2003 criteria, the 1998 single was certified Gold for 200,000 physical sales. Under current criteria, it would have received a Platinum certification.) and a placement at No. 88 on Oricon's year-end chart. It saw similar success on the CDTV chart, peaking at No. 9 on its weekly chart and No. 87 on its year-end chart. "Poison" also saw significant use in karaoke, finishing 64th on Joysound's 1998 ranking.

The Movie Mix single opened at No. 45 on Oricon's chart with 5,610 sales in December 1999; it rose to a peak position at No. 38 the next week in January 2000. In total, the Movie Mix charted for four unconsecutive weeks and moved 23,930 units.

The song has seen more charting and certifications in the 2000s and onwards. In 2014, a 2009 digital download single of the song was certified Gold by the RIAJ for 100,000 downloads. In March 2020, the song debuted on Billboard Japan's Hot 100 chart (established in 2008) at No. 38, powered by Twitter mentions and digital downloads. Billboard's editorial team attributed the resurgence to the song's virality as an Internet meme. In July the next year, it took No. 41 on Billboard's Top Download chart. In September 2023, "Poison" received a third Gold certification, awarded for 50 million streams.

== Legacy ==
Kadokawa publication The TV wrote in 2021 that the song had become representative of Sorimachi, and CDJournal described it as his "big break" and hit as a musician in their comment for the 1998 single. A 2018 survey by Yukina Satō of Social Trend News asked people to finish "Iitai koto mo ienai konna yo no naka ja...", the hook to "Poison". With 360 responses, it found that most respondents aged 5–19 during GTO's initial airing could accurately finish the hook, with an over 80% success rate for those who had been aged 14, 16, and 17.

"Poison" has appeared in subsequent GTO projects. In a 2020 drama adaptation of the GTO prequel Shonan Junai Gumi, starring Ichirō Kan as Onizuka, "Poison" was featured as an insert song. In July 2023, fashion site Zozotown announced a line of T-shirts based on "Poison" and the 1998 drama. In September the same year, it was announced that Sorimachi would reprise his role as Onizuka for GTO Revival, set to premiere in spring 2024. The announcement caused "POISON" to trend on X, alongside "Sorimachi Takashi" (反町隆史), "Onizuka Eikichi" (鬼塚英吉), and "Sorimachi-san" (反町さん).

=== Internet meme ===
In early 2018, a post was made to the "0-Year Old Childcare" thread of Japanese textboard 2channel, stating that "Poison" could ease crying children and even put them to sleep if played for longer. As users of the site corroborated the song's effectiveness, the story spread around the Internet. Sorimachi was told of the phenomenon several times by his management and others, and said on a November 2019 episode of Ken Radio: "If only I had known earlier, maybe I could've used it on my own kids when they were little. My older child always cried [...] If I'd have known, I would've just put on my own song."

"Poison" intro sample
The falling and rising guitar riff in the intro (riff isolated in audio file) was attributed to the song's ability to ease crying children.

In an interview with WithNews, pedagog Yōko Shimura of Saitama University attributed the song's ability to ease children to a "clear" rise and fall of sound in the song's basso continuo. In July 2021, Sorimachi's talent management company Ken-On released a YouTube video in which they tested the trend with Sorimachi. The video opens with Sorimachi reacting to clips showing the song effective on children from Japan, Brazil, the U.S., the United Kingdom, and New Zealand. Sorimachi then video calls with the head of the Japan Acoustic Lab, who, similarly to Shimura, theorizes that the high frequency in the intro's rising and falling guitar riff is able to stimulate and calm babies up to two years old. As of November 2023, the video has surpassed 2 million views.

== Live performances and covers ==
To promote High Life, Sorimachi embarked on the Live Tour 98 High Life throughout Japan, performing "Poison" among other songs from the album. The tour's final day, performed at the Nakano Sunplaza, was released to video on February 3, 1999. A DVD release followed on December 20, 2000. According to Goo Imatopi and Livedoor News, Sorimachi was intended to perform "Poison" on NHK's Kōhaku Uta Gassen, but was unable to since the song's title conflicted with the 1998 Wakayama Arsenic poison case, a murder case with heavy impact in Japan.

"Poison: Iitai Koto mo Ienai Konna Yo no Naka wa" has been remixed and covered by various other artists. It is the lead track of the techno remix album Cosmetic Dramatic (2009) and the 14th track on rock remix cover album Yanki Rock Non Stop Mix (2010). As a television ending theme, "Poison" has been recorded in drama-related albums, including on Climax Love Story: Chapter 1 (2012), the first drama theme compilation album in a series of two, and on Love Story: Dramatic Mix (2018) via a cover. The song has also been covered during on-stage performances, such as by Powan in 2015 and by Coldrain featuring Shūhei Igari in 2017.

"Poison" has become a staple song of comedian Takashi Okamura, often performed by him during All Night Nippon (ANN) song festivals hosted by his comedy group Ninety-nine; by October 2021, Okamura had performed the song six times. At the 2023 ANN festival, Sorimachi joined Okamura in performance of the song. Okamura, who had suffered a rupture of the achilles tendon on his right foot, sat on a chair with a visible cast and sang whilst Sorimachi stood. Okamura described the joint performance as something he couldn't have considered "even in [his] dreams."

== Personnel ==
Credits adapted from the 1998 single liner notes.

- Takashi Sorimachi – vocals, lyrics
- Jinjirō Inoue – composer
- Ken Yoshida – producer, arrangement
- Hiroyuki Hanada – composer ("If You Love Me, Don't Forget Me")
- Kō Nakayama – arrangement (Movie Mix)

== Track listing ==
All lyrics are written by Takashi Sorimachi.

1998 CD single (original)
No.	Title	Music	Arrangement	Length
1.	"Poison: Iitai Koto mo Ienai Konna Yo no Naka wa"	Jinjirō Inoue	Ken Yoshida	4:05
2.	"If You Love Me, Don't Forget Me"	Hiroyuki Hanada	Yoshida	4:42
3.	"Poison: Iitai Koto mo Ienai Konna Yo no Naka wa" (Instrumental)	Inoue	Yoshida	4:05
4.	"If You Love Me, Don't Forget Me" (Instrumental)	Hanada	Yoshida	4:42
Total length:				17:34

Movie Mix maxi single
No.	Title	Music	Arrangement	Length
1.	"Poison" (Movie Mix)	Inoue	Kō Nakayama	4:00
2.	"Poison 2000"	Inoue	Nakayama	6:00
3.	"Poison" (Movie Mix / Original Backing Tracks)	Inoue	Nakayama	4:00
Total length:				14:00

Digital single
No.	Title	Music	Arrangement	Length
1.	"Poison: Iitai Koto mo Ienai Konna Yo no Naka wa"	Inoue	Yoshida	4:02

== Charts ==
=== Weekly charts ===
==== 1998 single ====
Weekly chart performance for "Poison: Iitai Koto mo Ienai Konna Yo no Naka wa" (original)
Chart (1998)	Peak position
Japan (Oricon)	9
Japan (CDTV)	9

Weekly chart performance for "Poison: Iitai Koto mo Ienai Konna Yo no Naka wa" (original)
Chart (2020)	Peak position
Japan (Billboard Japan Hot 100)	38
Japan (CDTV)	43

Weekly chart performance for "Poison: Iitai Koto mo Ienai Konna Yo no Naka wa" (original)
Chart (2021)	Peak position
Japanese Top Download Songs (Billboard Japan)	41

==== Movie Mix single ====
Weekly chart performance for "Poison: Iitai Koto mo Ienai Konna Yo no Naka wa" (Movie Mix)
Chart (1999–00)	Peak position
Japan (Oricon)	38
Japan (CDTV)	51

=== Yearly charts ===
Year-end chart performance for "Poison: Iitai Koto mo Ienai Konna Yo no Naka wa" (original)
Chart (1998)	Position
Japan (Oricon)	88
Japan (CDTV)	87
Japanese Karaoke Songs (Joysound)	64

== Certifications and sales ==
Certifications for "Poison: Iitai Koto mo Ienai Konna Yo no Naka wa"
Region	Certification	Certified units/sales
Japan (RIAJ) 1998 physical single	Gold	270,010
Japan (RIAJ) Digital single	Platinum	250,000^{*}
Streaming
Japan (RIAJ)	Platinum	100,000,000^{†}
^{*} Sales figures based on certification alone.^{†} Streaming-only figures based on certification alone.

== Release history ==
Release dates and formats for "Poison: Iitai Koto mo Ienai Konna Yo no Naka wa"
Region	Date	Format	Version	Label	Catalogue code	Ref(s).
Japan	July 29, 1998	Mini (8 cm) CD single	Original	Mercury Music Entertainment	PHDL-1170	
Japan	December 18, 1999	12 cm maxi single	Movie Mix	Mercury Music Entertainment	PHCL-11014	
Japan	September 30, 2009	Digital download single	—N/a	Universal Music Japan	—N/a	

=== Via albums ===
Albums featuring "Poison: Iitai Koto mo Ienai Konna Yo no Naka wa" (Note: Discludes covers, remixes, and third-party compilation albums.)
Region	Type	Album	Date	Label	Ref(s).
Japan	Soundtrack album	GTO: Original Soundtrack	August 12, 1998	Mercury Music Entertainment	
Japan	Studio album	High Life	September 18, 1998	Mercury Music Entertainment	
Japan	Live album	Live Tour 98 High Life	February 3, 1999	Mercury Music Entertainment	
Japan	Greatest hits album	Best of My Time: 1999	March 29, 2003	Mercury Music Entertainment	
Japan	Greatest hits album	Best of Best	June 7, 2006	Universal Music Japan	
Japan	Greatest hits album	Golden Best	December 8, 2010	Universal Music Japan	
