= Roaring Fire =

- Theatrical release poster
- Directed by: Norifumi Suzuki
- Written by: Norifumi Suzuki; Masakazi Suzuki; Shinsuke Inoue
- Produced by: Tatsuo Honda; Goro Kusakabe
- Starring: Hiroyuki Sanada; Etsuko Shihomi; Sonny Chiba; Mikio Narita
- Cinematography: Kiyoshi Kitasaka
- Edited by: Isamu Ichida
- Music by: Kentaro Haneda
- Distributed by: Toei
- Release date: 1 May 1982 (U.S.)
- Running time: 98 minutes
- Country: Japan
- Languages: Japanese; English

Roaring Fire (Japanese: 吼えろ鉄拳, Hepburn: Hoero! Tekken) is a 1981 Japanese martial arts film co-written and directed by Norifumi Suzuki and starring Hiroyuki Sanada, Etsuko Shihomi, and Sonny Chiba, who also choreographed the film's action sequences. The film also had former professional wrestler Abdullah the Butcher in a major role as an enemy-turned-ally of Sanada's hero character.

== Plot ==
In Hong Kong, a crime syndicate has cornered and ultimately shot down Toru Hinoharu, the heir to a major business corporation. Meanwhile, in Texas, we learn that there is another man who looks exactly like the late Toru, a cowboy named Joji Hibiki. When Joji learns his father is on his deathbed, his father reveals the truth about him. Given a letter, Joji learns that Mr. Hibiki had kidnapped Joji as a young boy due to his aspirations on trying to be wealthy in Japan. However, over the eighteen years, Hibiki actually thought of Joji as a son. Hibiki writes that Joji has a twin brother and sister and had read in a Japanese newspaper that his twin brother (Toru) was killed in Hong Kong. Joji heads to Japan to learn the truth about who he is.

Upon his arrival in Kobe, Joji meets a man who attempts to pickpocket him. While the man successfully steals his wallet, Joji's insistence to take him to the old Hinoharu place allows the thief to take him there. When Joji arrives with his monkey Peter, Peter steals a top from a bikini clad woman, prompting the woman and her friends to confront Joji. When Joji attempts to say it was a mistake, the girls call for the hulking Spartacus, whose futile attempts to catch Joji eventually gives the duo a level of respect. Meanwhile, someone has recognized Joji and mistakes him for the dead Toru. That night, Joji finds the pickpocket and confronts him and his friends. However, the group soon earn Joji's respect and they become friends.

Ikeda Hinokaru has learned about Joji and takes him in. Joji meets his sister Chihiro, who has been blind since the age of nine. At first thinking Joji is Toru, Joji reveals his true identity and Chihiro is relieved to hear she has another brother. To celebrate Joji's return, Ikeda gives Joji a chance to see Chihiro demonstrate her martial arts skills. While she is blinded, she uses the power of sound and the wind to find her attackers. That night, the family heads to a show performed by ventriloquist "Mr. Magic", who through his puppet, tells Joji that his uncle may not be who he is seen to be. When the group returns him, Joji overhears a conversation with Ikeda and the father of Reika, one of his new friends. Joji learns his uncle is the head of a local syndicate and that he has hired Reika's father to find a rare diamond known as the Queen of Sheba. When Reika's father attempts to quit, he is stomped on by Ikeda's moll and is forced to remain when Ikeda threatens to tell Reika about her father. Ikeda learns Joji has overheard the conversation and sets out to stop him. He puts Joji into a trap where he is forced to fight an American boxer followed by a staff expert. Joji is able to defeat them both and escape.

The next day, Joji, Reika, and another friend are chased by a ninja-like brigade hired by Ikeda, in which the friend, willing to distract them so Joji and Reika can escape, ends up thrown in a garbage can after an attempt to fight them off. When Ikeda sends some of his own men against Joji, Joji is able to fend off some of them until he is cornered. He gets some help from Spartacus, who sacrifices himself in order for Joji to escape. Joji and Reika are left, being chased by some shogun-like goons on bicycles until the entire brigade crash in a pile of cardboard boxes. Ikeda, unhappy with what has happened, decides to use Chihiro for bait and despite her efforts to fend off against her traitorous uncle and goons, is beaten bad and forced to take heroin. When Joji is forced to find the Queen of Shiba, he finds the diamond and when he returns with the diamond for Chihiro, he and Reika fall into a trap, but not before Reika sees her father shot down before her. One of Ikeda's molls, dressed up like a member of the Third Reich, has the trap Joji and Reika in filled with gas that was apparently used during World War II, which will cause madness within ten minutes. When the moll slips up into the trap, Joji and Reika and able to escape while the moll falls into madness.

Joji fights off more thugs and successfully rescues Chihiro, who by this time, is heavily under the influence from heroin and tells Joji that he must keep the Hinoharu name alive for good. When Ikeda and his goons arrive to kill Joji, Chihiro sacrifices herself to save her brother as she is shot down and falls off a cliff. Joji learns that Ikeda is planning to use the Queen of Sheba to forge an alliance with the Hong Kong syndicate responsible for Toru's death. Joji heads to Hong Kong to follow his uncle and seeks revenge. After fighting off both members of the syndicate and Ikeda's men in the streets, Joji gets assistance from Mr. Magic, who is revealed to be Shinsuke Tachizawa, a narcotics agent working for Interpol. Tachizawa tells Joji to let the authorities handle the matter, but Joji is insistent on getting to Ikeda. At first, Tachizawa threatens to arrest Joji but instead helps him. A brief fight scene with Joji and Tachizawa teaming up leads to the arrest of the Hong Kong syndicate boss.

When Ikeda and his group are celebrating their alliance, Joji busts in by throwing one of Ikeda's men through the glass roof, forcing the thug to crash into the dinner table. Joji singlehandedly faces off against all of Ikeda's men. With his lead moll and one henchmen shooting at him, he is able to use the sais of one of Ikeda's men and throws it at their hands. Ikeda narrowly escapes when Joji fights a hulking member of the goons. Joji is able to defeat the big man and finds himself targeted by more of Ikeda's men. An attempt to follow Ikeda by horseback leads to two men in a helicopter following Joji. One sports grenades and the other a machine gun. As Joji attempts to hide, he uses a tomahawk to hit the helicopter's fuel tank. When the gun-trotting thug sees Joji, his attempt to shoot Joji causes him to hit the leaking gas, causing the helicopter to crash, killing both thugs.

Joji then diverts Ikeda's getaway car into the river after forcing a samurai henchman to accidentally kill the driver. Ikeda escapes before the car plunges into the river. When the samurai comes out to confront Joji, he is distracted by Joji's splashing of the water. Joji gives the samurai a crushing blow to his throat. Ikeda is the last one remaining and Joji follows him up a small cliff. Ikeda shoots Joji in the shoulder, forcing him to hide behind rocks. Taking off his shirt and throwing it as a distraction, Ikeda is now confronted by Joji and after having one bullet left, tells Joji they have the same Hinoharu blood. Joji responds that his name is Joji Hibiki and is able to kick the gun out of Ikeda and puts him up against the cliff wall. Giving Ikeda the Queen of Sheba, Joji sees Ikeda grabng and looking at the diamond, at which he then proceeds to impale Ikeda's eye with the diamond with a punch. Ikeda falls off the cliff to his death. Tachizawa arrives and arrests Joji. On the ride back, Tachizawa decides to let Joji by using magic to uncuff him. Joji, excited at the chance to leave and return to Texas, is seen in a freeze frame as he jumps out of the helicopter into the ocean.

== Cast ==
- Hiroyuki Sanada as Joji Hibiki/Toru Hinoharu
- Etsuko Shihomi as Chihiro Hinoharu
- Sonny Chiba as Shinsuke "Mr. Magic" Tachizawa
- Tatsuo Endō as Yo Gentoku
- Mikio Narita as Ikeda Hinoharu
- Abdullah the Butcher as Spartacus
- Liner Getzman as the American boxer

== Release ==
New Line Cinema released the film in May 1982 and credited Hiroyuki Sanada as "Duke Sanada", something New Line Cinema had done with their Japanese film releases and giving the lead actors Western names for the markets.
