= Tsuge Yoshiharu World: Gensenkan Shujin =

- DVD cover
- Directed by: Teruo Ishii
- Screenplay by: Teruo Ishii
- Based on: Gensenkan Shujin by Yoshiharu Tsuge
- Starring: Shirō Sano; Kitaro; Kaoru Mizuki; Jtarō Sugisaku; Akio Yokoyama
- Cinematography: Koichi Ishii
- Edited by: Yoshiyuki Okuhara
- Music by: Hajime Kaburagi
- Production companies: Kinoshita Film; Sedic; TFC
- Distributed by: Daiei Film
- Release date: April 24, 1993 (Japan)
- Running time: 98 minutes
- Country: Japan
- Language: Japanese

Tsuge Yoshiharu World: Gensenkan Shujin (Japanese: ゲンセンカン主人), also known as Gensen-Kan Inn, is a 1993 Japanese film directed by Teruo Ishii.

== Cast ==
- Shirō Sano as Yoshiharu Tsuge
- Kitaro as Suyama
- Kaoru Mizuki as Madame at Gensen-Kan
- Jtarō Sugisaku as Sanryu-san
- Akio Yokoyama as Mr. Lee
- Nana Okada as Fukuko
- Chika Nakagami as Mr. Lee's wife
- Emu Hisazumi as Sayoko
- Mayo Kawasaki

== Background ==
The film is an adaptation of Yoshiharu Tsuge's Master of the Gensenkan Inn (1968).

== Reception ==
It was chosen as the 6th Best Film at the 15th Yokohama Film Festival. Kaoru Mizuki also won the Award for Best Supporting Actress.
