= Kaoru Mizuki =

Japanese actress (born 1959)

- Born: June 16, 1959 (age 66); Yokohama, Kanagawa Prefecture, Japan
- Occupation: Actress
- Years active: 1982–present

Kaoru Mizuki (水木薫, Mizuki Kaoru) is a Japanese actress. She won the Award for Best Supporting Actress at the 15th Yokohama Film Festival for Tsuge Yoshiharu World: Gensenkan Shujin.

== Filmography ==
- Tsuge Yoshiharu World: Gensenkan Shujin (1993)
- Wind-Up Type (1998)
- Kamen Rider Hibiki (2005-2006)
- Kamen Rider Hibiki & The Seven Senki (2005)
- Kizumomo (2008)
