= Takashi Sorimachi =

Japanese actor and singer (born 1973)

- 反町 隆史
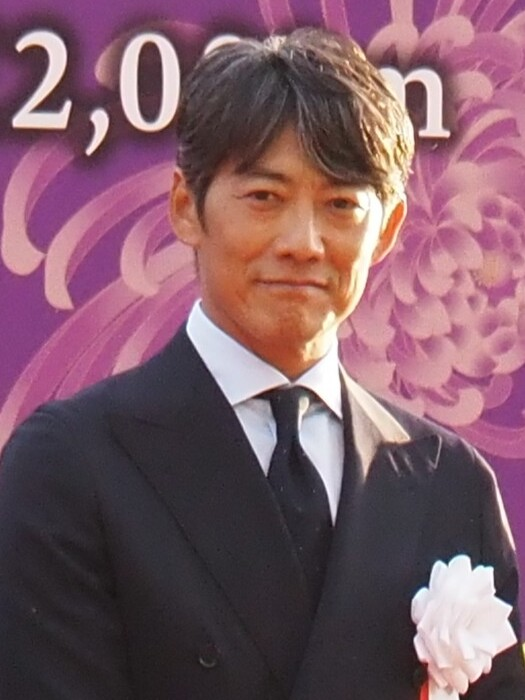
- Sorimachi in 2025
- Born: Takashi Noguchi (野口 隆史, Noguchi Takashi); December 19, 1973 (age 52); Saitama, Japan
- Occupations: Actor; singer; model
- Years active: 1988–1990; 1994–present
- Agent: Ken-On
- Spouse: Nanako Matsushima (m. 2001)
- Children: 2
- Musical career
- Genre: J-pop
- Instruments: Vocals; Guitar
- Label: Mercury Records

Takashi Noguchi (野口 隆史, Noguchi Takashi; born December 19, 1973), known professionally as Takashi Sorimachi (反町 隆史, Sorimachi Takashi), is a Japanese actor and singer. He is mostly famous for having portrayed Eikichi Onizuka in the 1998 live-action drama adaptation of the popular manga series Great Teacher Onizuka, and the assassin O in Hong Kong action thriller film Fulltime Killer.

== Career ==
Sorimachi was a member of Johnny & Associates's trainee group Heike-ha when he was in the third year of junior high school, under his real name, Takashi Noguchi, as backdancer of group Hikaru Genji, together with members of the agency's current groups Tokio (Shigeru Jojima, Tatsuya Yamaguchi, and Taichi Kokubun) and 20th Century (Masayuki Sakamoto), among others, but decided to leave both the group and the agency within the year, to pursue a career as a model and actor.

By 1994, Sorimachi was invited to participate at the Paris Fashion Week catwalk. He debuted as an actor that year with the drama "Maido Gomen Nasai", under his stage name.

With his acting in "Beach Boys", released in 1997, Sorimachi was calling the attention as a first-line actor. With that drama, he also debuted as a singer, releasing his first single "FOREVER", receiving the award of Newcomer of the Year at the 12th Japan Gold Disc Awards.

Another big attention grabber was 1998's Great Teacher Onizuka (GTO), which not only provided Sorimachi with the iconic role of rebel teacher Eikichi Onizuka, but also another chance to sing, releasing the theme song "Poison", a song that has a mysterious way to soothe crying babies up to age 2 all around the world. This was a sensation on the net after fans learned of the phenomenon from Sorimachi himself, when he was interviewed by his agency Ken-On's YouTube channel in 2021. "I'm happy to think that my work continues to help others. My friends tell me that they listened to this song with their babies and it stopped them from crying. I'm very happy.", he said, amused.

In 2005 he starred in the movie Otoko-tachi no Yamato as Sergeant Moriwaki, the leader of the soup kitchen on the battleship Yamato.

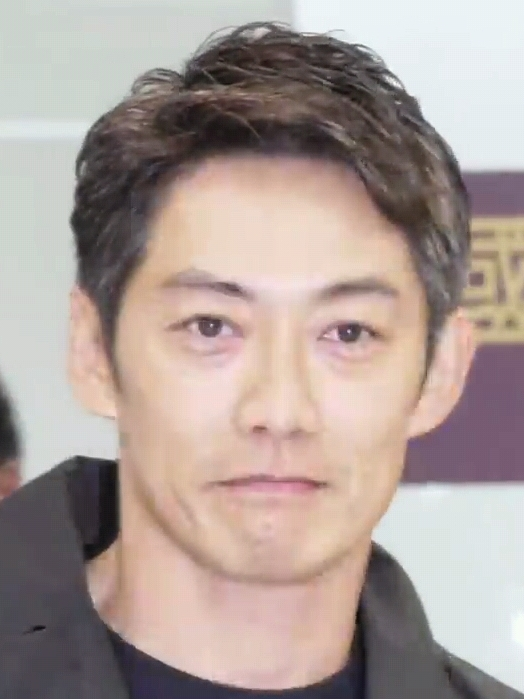
Sorimachi in 2019

In November 2023, Takashi Sorimachi co-starred along with his wife Nanako Matsushima in a commercial for skincare and makeup label Shiseido, marking it the couple's first screen shared in 25 years following their appearance in GTO, and the first time the couple co-starred together following their marriage in 2001. They appeared together again for a new Shiseido commercial in 2025. The couple also reprised their roles in GTO Revival, a 2024 special episode revival of 1998's TV Series.

In June 2026, it was announced through the official X account of GTO Revival, now renamed to GTO2026summer, that Sorimachi is to reprise his role again for a new GTO Revival series set to release on July 20, 2026.

== Personal life ==
On February 21, 2001, he married actress Nanako Matsushima, who he co-starred with in GTO.

On May 31, 2004, his wife gave birth to a baby girl. The couple had a second daughter on November 30, 2007.

== Filmography ==
=== Television ===
Year	Title	Role	Notes	Ref.
1997	Virgin Road	Kaoru Yoshimi		
1997	Beach Boys	Hiromi Sakurai	Lead role	
1998–2026	Great Teacher Onizuka	Eikichi Onizuka	Lead role; 2 seasons	
2002	Toshiie and Matsu	Oda Nobunaga	Taiga drama	
2013	Yae's Sakura	Ōyama Iwao	Taiga drama	
2015–2022	AIBOU: Tokyo Detective Duo	Wataru Kaburagi	Season 14–20	
2024	Okura: Cold Case Investigation	Senju Hidaka	Lead role	
2024	GTO Revival	Eikichi Onizuka	Lead role; television film	
2026	Water Margin	Chao Gai		
2026	Soda Master	Yuta "Yuen" Yoshii	Lead role	

=== Film ===
Year	Title	Role	Notes	Ref.
2003	The Thirteen Steps	Jun'ichi Mikami	Lead role	
2005	Yamato	Shōhachi Moriwaki	Lead role	
2007	The Blue Wolf: To the Ends of the Earth and Sea	Genghis Khan	Lead role	
2020	Mio's Cookbook	Mizuhara Tōzai		

== Discography ==
=== Studio albums ===
List of studio albums, with selected chart positions and sales figures
Title	Album details	Peak chart positions	Sales (Note: Sales provided by the Oricon You Taiju service and rounded down to nearest thousand.)
Title	Album details	JPN	Sales
Message (メッセージ)	Released: September 10, 1997; Label: Mercury Music Entertainment; Formats: CD	3	JPN: 92,000
High Life	Released: September 18, 1998; Label: Mercury Music Entertainment; Formats: CD	15	JPN: 54,000
Forever Dream	Released: December 19, 1998; Label: Mercury Music Entertainment; Formats: CD	10	JPN: 64,000
Soul	Released: December 6, 2000; Label: Mercury Music Entertainment; Formats: CD	100	JPN: 2,000

=== Compilation albums ===
List of compilation albums, with selected chart positions and sales figures
Title	Album details	Peak chart positions	Sales
Title	Album details	JPN	Sales
Best of My Time	Released: March 17, 1999; Label: Mercury Music Entertainment; Formats: CD	48	JPN: 7,000
Best of Best	Released: June 7, 2006; Label: Universal Music Japan; Formats: CD	—	
Golden Best	Released: December 8, 2010; Label: Universal Music Japan; Formats: CD	—	
"—" denotes a recording that did not chart or was not released in that territory.

=== Video albums ===
List of video albums
Title	Album details
Message	Released: March 25, 1998; Label: Mercury Music Entertainment; Formats: VHS, DVD
Clips and More	Released: December 2, 1998; Label: Mercury Music Entertainment; Formats: VHS
Live Tour 98 High Life	Released: December 20, 2000; Label: Universal Music Japan; Formats: DVD
1997-2000 Single Clips	Released: December 20, 2000; Label: Universal Music Japan; Formats: DVD

=== Singles ===
List of singles as lead artist, with selected chart positions, sales figures, and certifications
Title	Year	Peak positions		Sales	Certifications	Album
Title	Year	JPN	JPN Hot 100 (Note: The Billboard Japan Hot 100 was established in 2008.)	Sales	Certifications	Album
"Forever" (with Richie Sambora)	1997	3	—	JPN: 507,000	RIAJ: Platinum	Message
"Forever Dream"	1997	10	—			Forever Dream
"One"	1998	8	—	JPN: 200,000	RIAJ: Gold	High Life
"Poison: Iitai Koto mo Ienai Konna Yo no Naka wa"	1998	9	38	JPN: 270,000	RIAJ (physical): Gold; RIAJ (digital): Platinum; RIAJ (streaming): Platinum	High Life
"Poison" (Movie Mix)	1999	38	—	JPN: 23,000		Non-album single
"Free"	2000	35	—	JPN: 10,000		Soul
"—" denotes a recording that did not chart or was not released in that territory.

=== Other singles ===
- Poison (GTO Revival theme song) (Blue Encount feat. Takashi Sorimachi) (March 2024)
