= Majo no Jōken =

1999 Japanese television series

- Written by: Kazuhiko Yukawa
- Directed by: Nobuhiro Doi; Kazuhiro Naniwa; Osamu Katayama
- Starring: Nanako Matsushima; Hideaki Takizawa
- Theme music composer: Ken Shima
- Opening theme: First Love by Hikaru Utada
- Country of origin: Japan
- Original language: Japanese
- No. of episodes: 11

Production
- Producer: Yasuo Yagi
- Production locations: Musashi University, etc.
- Running time: 45 minutes

Original release
- Network: TBS
- Release: April 8 – June 17, 1999

Majo no Jōken (魔女の条件) (English title: Terms for a Witch) is a drama series that aired in Japan on TBS in 1999. This drama features Nanako Matsushima of Great Teacher Onizuka fame and Hideaki Takizawa of the idol duo Tackey & Tsubasa.

== Synopsis ==
Michi Hirose is a 26-year-old high school teacher who is engaged to a man, but she is unsure if she loves him. On her way to work, Michi is nearly run over by a teenager on his motorcycle and loses her engagement ring. The boy finds it and gives it to her without telling her who he is. At school, Michi finds that she has a new student, 17-year-old Hikaru Kurosawa, who is revealed to be the boy from earlier. Hikaru is a delinquent who has been expelled from several schools, but becomes soft to Michi after she talks with him. Hikaru has a strained relationship with his overprotective mother, who expects him to eventually take over the hospital she manages.

Michi finds herself drawn to Hikaru because they desire a world of freedom from their issues. Hikaru makes his feelings known when he tries to kiss Michi, but she rejects him. When asks if Michi really wants to marry her fiance, Masaru Kitai, she cannot bring herself to an answer. Hikaru's mother quickly becomes suspicious of their relationship. Michi begins to skip meetings with Masaru and parents to see Hikaru, and eventually realizes that she is falling in love with him. One night, Hikaru calls her to the school, where they have their first kiss and sleep together in the library. Jun Kinoshita, Hikaru's classmate who has suspected the affair, tells him that Michi will suffer the consequences.

Hikaru's mother alerts the school officials to the affair, and Michi is told to use her engagement as a reason to resign. Instead, she confesses to the whole school that she loves Hikaru and that what they are doing is not wrong. Instead of being fired, Michi is moved to a different class. To find happiness, Michi and Hikaru decide to run away together. Masaru fails to stop them and ends up being seduced by Michi's friend Kiriko. Michi and Hikaru move around over the next few months until his mother tracks them down and has Michi arrested. Hikaru is hospitalized after his mother accidentally injures him during a heated argument. Michi and Hikaru contact each other again and try to escape, only for Michi to be arrested again. Hikaru's mother tries to make him forget Michi by paying his tutor to seduce him, but he rejects her. She then sends Hikaru to America to study abroad. Michi finds him at the airport and asks him to stay, but Hikaru says that he no longer loves her, in order to protect her.

Michi discovers that Jun suffers physical abuse by her drunken father, and decides to take her in. After falling ill and passing out, Michi finds out that she is pregnant with Hikaru's child. When her father demands that she have an abortion, she leaves the house. Hikaru returns and embraces Michi, and promises to stay with her and their child forever. Michi nearly has a miscarriage and faints, and is told by the doctor that she may not be physically able to carry the baby to term. The couple begins living together and is determined to raise the baby as a family. Kiriko grows irritated at Michi for not realizing her feelings for Masaru and they have a brief fallout, but reconcile. Meanwhile, Hikaru's mother is fired from the hospital and, despondent over this and losing Hikaru, attempts suicide.

Michi decides to move in with Kiriko to let Hikaru take care of his mother, and finds a job at a new high school. During a field trip, she and Hikaru argue over whether their relationship is affecting their families and friends. After another near-miscarriage, the doctor tells Hikaru and her parents that she will have to abort the pregnancy. Hikaru reluctantly agrees, but Michi refuses and runs away from the hospital, pleading Hikaru not to kill their baby. Despite this tender moment, Michi ultimately miscarries and falls into a coma during the surgery. Masaru and Hikaru's mother finally accept the relationship. Jun decides to become a lawyer to help people in Michi and Hikaru's situation. Hikaru studies hard for college and decides to become a doctor. When he visits and lays next to Michi, she seemingly wakes from her coma to embrace him before they fall asleep together.

== Cast ==
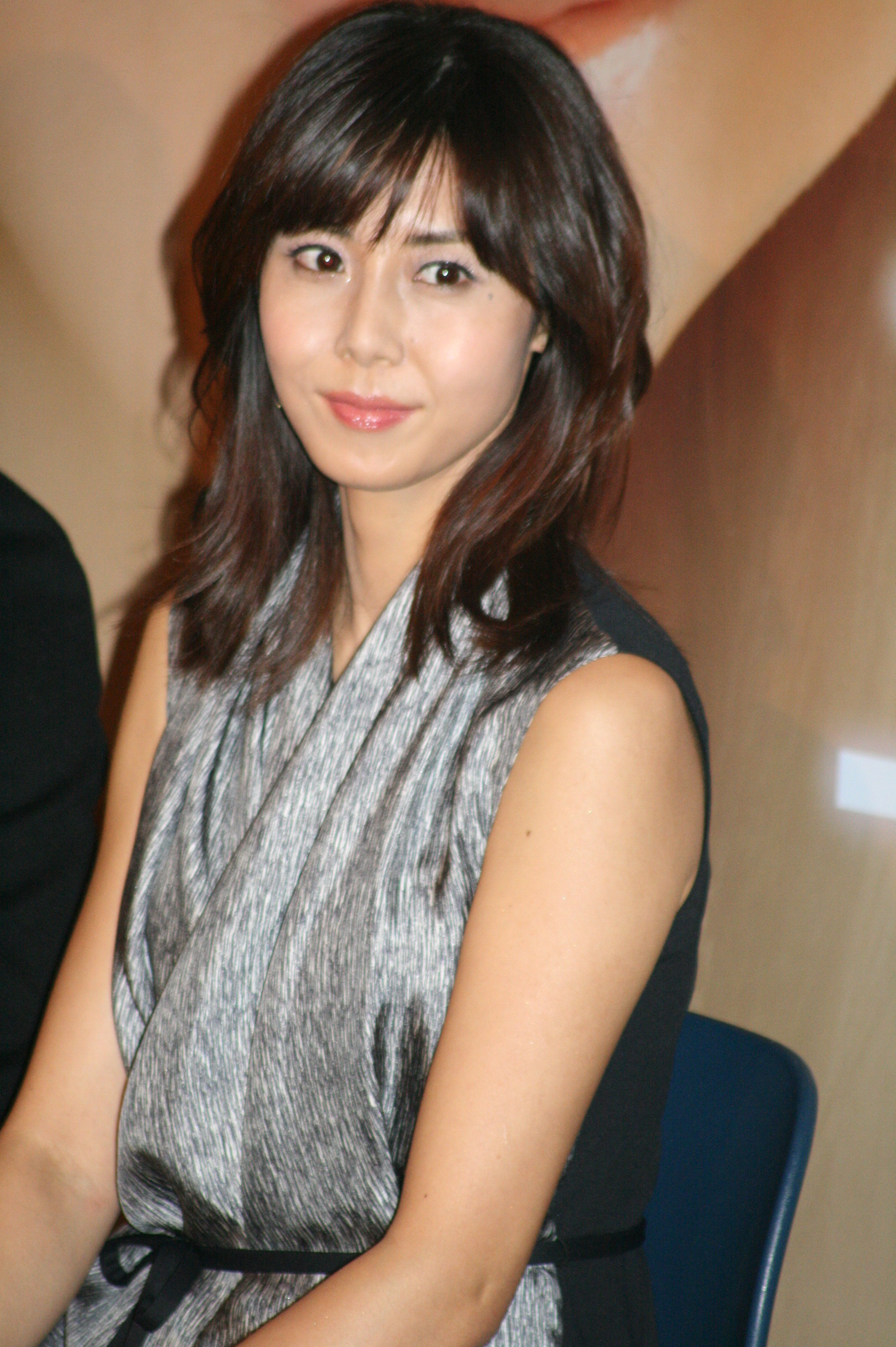
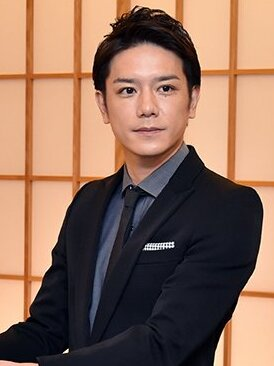
Nanako Matsushima (left, 2009) and Hideaki Takizawa (right, 2017) starred in the drama series.
- Nanako Matsushima as Michi Hirose (26)
- Hideaki Takizawa as Hikaru Kurosawa (17)
- Tetsuya Bessho as Masaru Kitai (30) (Michi's fiancee)
- Rin Ozawa as Miharu Sugai (21) (Hikaru's home tutor)
- Naomi Nishida as Kiriko Uda (26) (Masaru's colleague & Michi's friend)
- Maiko Yamada as Jun Kinoshita (17) (Hikaru's classmate)
- Yuichiro Yamaguchi as Yu Godai (42) (Doctor at Kurosawa Hospital)
- Ryosei Tayama as Okajima Sensei (50) (Ryousei High School Director)
- Youichi Nukumizu as Matsuoka Sensei (35) (History teacher)
- Kazue Tsunogae as Shunin Shimoda (45)
- Kazunaga Tsuji as Kenichi Hirose (59) (Michi's father)
- Yumi Shirakawa as Motoko Hirose (56) (Michi's mother)
- Hitomi Kuroki as Kyoko Kurosawa (39) (Hikaru's mother)

== Awards ==
=== 21st Television Drama Academy Awards ===
- Best Drama
- Best Casting
- Best Theme Song

First Love by Hikaru Utada
