= We Are Not Alone (1993 film) =

- DVD cover
- Directed by: Yōjirō Takita
- Written by: Nobuyuki Isshiki
- Starring: Hiroyuki Sanada; Ittoku Kishibe; Kyūsaku Shimada
- Cinematography: Takeshi Hamada
- Edited by: Isao Tomita
- Music by: Yasuaki Shimizu
- Distributed by: Shochiku
- Release date: March 13, 1993 (Japan)
- Running time: 115 minutes
- Country: Japan
- Language: Japanese

We Are Not Alone (Japanese: 僕らはみんな生きている, Hepburn: Bokura wa minna ikite iru), also known as Made in Japan, is a 1993 Japanese film directed by Yōjirō Takita.

== Cast ==
- Hiroyuki Sanada
- Ittoku Kishibe
- Kyūsaku Shimada
- Yū Hayami
- Tsutomu Yamazaki

== Reception ==
It was chosen as the 4th Best Film at the 15th Yokohama Film Festival. Hiroyuki Sanada also won the Award for Best Actor.
