= Nemuranai Machi: Shinjuku Same =

- DVD cover
- Directed by: Yōjirō Takita
- Screenplay by: Haruhiko Arai
- Based on: Shinjuku Shark by Arimasa Osawa
- Produced by: Shin'ya Kawai; Toshio Kobayashi
- Starring: Hiroyuki Sanada; Tadanobu Asano; Tadao Nakamaru; Hideo Murota; Eiji Okuda; Shigeru Yazaki; Masayuki Imai; Yasuhiro Arai
- Cinematography: Takeshi Hamada
- Edited by: Isao Tomita
- Music by: Shigeru Umebayashi
- Distributed by: Shochiku Co., Ltd. Empire Pictures
- Release date: October 8, 1993 (Japan)
- Running time: 117 minutes
- Country: Japan
- Language: Japanese

Nemuranai Machi: Shinjuku Same (Japanese: 眠らない街 新宿鮫), which is known in English as The City That Never Sleeps: Shinjuku Shark, is a 1993 Japanese film directed by Yōjirō Takita and starring Hiroyuki Sanada, Tadanobu Asano and Tadao Nakamaru.

== Plot ==
Detective Same is out to solve a murder of innocent civilians.

== Cast ==
- Hiroyuki Sanada as Detective Same
- Minako Tanaka as Sho
- Hideo Murota as Momoi
- Eiji Okuda as Kizu
- Shigeru Yazaki as Yabu
- Masayuki Imai as Koda
- Yasuhiro Arai as Yoshikawa
- Tadanobu Asano as Sunagami
- Tadao Nakamaru as Fujimaru
