= Ju-On: The Grudge =

- Theatrical release poster

Japanese name
- Kanji: 呪怨
- Kana: じゅおん
Transcriptions
- Revised Hepburn: Juon
- Directed by: Takashi Shimizu
- Written by: Takashi Shimizu
- Produced by: Taka Ichise
- Starring: Megumi Okina; Misaki Ito; Misa Uehara; Yui Ichikawa; Kanji Tsuda; Kayoko Shibata; Yukako Kukuri; Shuri Matsuda; Yōji Tanaka; Yoshiyuki Morishita; Hideo Sakaki; Takashi Matsuyama; Takako Fuji
- Cinematography: Tokusho Kikumura
- Edited by: Nobuyuki Takahashi
- Music by: Shiro Sato
- Production companies: Pioneer LDC; Nikkatsu; Oz Co.; Xanadeux
- Distributed by: Tokyo Theatres; Xanadeux
- Release dates: 18 October 2002 (Screamfest); 25 January 2003 (Japan)
- Running time: 92 minutes
- Country: Japan
- Language: Japanese
- Box office: $3.7 million

Ju-On: The Grudge is a 2002 Japanese supernatural horror film written and directed by Takashi Shimizu. It is the third installment in the Ju-On series and the first to be released theatrically (the first two being direct-to-video productions). It stars Megumi Okina, Misaki Ito, Misa Uehara, Yui Ichikawa, Kanji Tsuda, Kayoko Shibata, Yukako Kukuri, Shuri Matsuda, Yōji Tanaka, Yoshiyuki Morishita, Hideo Sakaki, Takashi Matsuyama and Takako Fuji.

Ju-On: The Grudge premiered at the Screamfest Film Festival on 18 October 2002, by Lions Gate Films. The film received favourable reviews from critics but was initially unfavourably compared to another Japanese horror film, Ring, but subsequent reception has been more positive.

A sequel to the film titled Ju-On: The Grudge 2, also directed by Shimizu, was released in 2003.

It also spawned a franchise, an American remake, 2006 and 2009 sequels, a 2020 sidequel to the remake and a prequel television series entitled Ju-On: Origins, which premiered in 2020.

== Plot ==
Several years before the main plot, Takeo Saeki murders his wife Kayako after discovering she is in love with another man, also killing the family cat, Mar, and his son, Toshio. The murders create a curse that revives the family as vengeful ghosts, which results in Kayako's ghost murdering Takeo. Whoever enters their house in Nerima, Tokyo, is eventually consumed by the curse, which spreads to the place they die in and in turn consumes anyone who comes in.

The latest owners of the house are the Tokunaga family, consisting of salaryman Katsuya, his wife Kazumi, and his ill mother Sachie. Kazumi is quickly consumed by the curse, and Katsuya is possessed by Takeo before dying as well. Kayako's ghost follows Katsuya's sister Hitomi to her office, where it kills a security guard, and then to her apartment, where it kills her as well.

Social worker Rika is sent by her boss Hirohashi to take care of Sachie. She discovers Toshio before she witnesses Sachie being killed by Kayako's ghost, causing her to faint in shock. Hirohashi finds Rika and contacts the police. Detectives Nakagawa and Igarashi discover Katsuya's and Kazumi's bodies in the attic and later learn of Hitomi's disappearance and the death of the security guard at her workplace. Hirohashi's body is discovered, and the ghosts begin to haunt Rika.

Upon researching the history of the house and the Saeki murders, Nakagawa and Igarashi contact a retired detective named Toyama, who is afraid of revisiting the case. Toyama goes to burn the house down but hears a group of teenage girls upstairs. One flees while the others are consumed. Kayako then appears, chasing Toyama away but killing Nakagawa and Igarashi. After becoming a shut-in, Toyama eventually succumbs to the curse, leaving behind a young daughter named Izumi.

After visiting the house, Rika moved on with her life. Her friend Mariko, an elementary school teacher, pays a visit to Toshio, who is registered as her student but has never shown up for class. Rika races to save her but is too late. Kayako's ghost comes after her but Rika sees herself as the "true face" of Kayako. Rika assumes Kayako's role and, from her perspective, is cornered by Takeo's ghost, who kills her in the same way he killed Kayako.

As a teenager, Izumi visits the house with her friends but flees while Kayako kills her friends; this is the event Toyama witnessed when he visited the house, as a vision of the future. Two weeks pass and two of Izumi's other friends visit her to deliver some photos. A news broadcast confirms Rika's body has been found at the Saeki residence after she was reported missing. They find that Izumi is wrought with guilt for abandoning her friends and has become increasingly paranoid, and her mother is under the influence of the curse as well. As Izumi's friends leave, they find that she and her dead friends have their eyes blackened out in photos. Izumi encounters a vision of her dead father and then discovers the ghosts of her friends watching her. She is cornered by her dead friends, only for Kayako to appear and drag her into damnation.

Many posters of missing persons lie on the ground in the almost deserted Tokyo streets. Rika's corpse, now with a much longer hairstyle similar to Kayako's, lies in the house's attic, only to reawaken with a death rattle.

== Cast ==
- Megumi Okina as Rika Nishina
- Misa Uehara as Izumi Toyama
  - Tomomi Kobayashi as Young Izumi
- Misaki Ito as Hitomi Tokunaga
- Yui Ichikawa as Chiharu
- Yōji Tanaka as Yûji Tôyama
- Kanji Tsuda as Katsuya Tokunaga
- Shuri Matsuda as Kazumi Tokunaga
- Kayoko Shibata as Mariko Uki
- Hirokazu Inoue as Detective Kenichi Nakagawa
- Daisuke Honda as Detective Daisuke Igarashi
- Risa Odagiri as Saori Takamiya
- Kaori Nakajô as Chiaki Nakano
- Kana Kobayashi as Ayano Muto
- Yukako Kukuri as Miyuki
- Hideo Sakaki as Welfare Center Clerk
- Chikako Isomura as Sachie Tokunaga
- Yoshiyuki Morishita as Security Guard
- Miho Fujima as Joshi Ana
- Isao Yatsu as Saito
- Takako Fuji as Kayako Saeki
- Yuya Ozeki as Toshio Saeki
- Takashi Matsuyama as Takeo Saeki

== Production ==
Director Takashi Shimizu developed the Ju-On series from several separate horror stories that he initially lacked the time and budget to produce as individual feature films. He cited Krzysztof Kieślowski's television series Dekalog as an influence on the interconnected narrative structure, explaining that he conceived the stories as pieces of a puzzle linked by a supernatural curse centred on a single house.

Before directing the theatrical film, Shimizu had made two low-budget, direct-to-video Ju-On productions, which were filmed over nine days. Their popularity led to the production of Ju-On: The Grudge as a theatrical feature. The film was shot on location in Tokyo, including a house in the city's suburbs. Shimizu described the production as low-budget and recalled that the house subsequently attracted visitors following the film's success, prompting complaints from neighbours.

Shimizu worked with sound designer Masato Komatsu, encouraging him to intensify the film's sound effects and music. Shimizu also provided the distinctive rattling vocalisation associated with the ghost Kayako, a sound he recalled experimenting with during his childhood. Actress Takako Fuji, who portrayed Kayako, later credited Shimizu with devising the character's distinctive movements, which were also informed by her childhood ballet training.

At a December 2002 preview screening, Takashi Shimizu explained that although the film's story was fictional, he had incorporated elements from accounts of purported real-life supernatural experiences. The report identified Shin Mimibukuro, a collection of Japanese ghost stories by Hirokatsu Kihara and Ichirō Nakayama, as a source of some of these elements.

== Release ==
Ju-on: The Grudge was shown on 18 October 2002 at the Screamfest Horror Film Festival in Los Angeles California under the title The Grudge. Ju-On: The Grudge was released theatrically in Japan on 25 January 2003. Later that year, the film was released in Hong Kong on 29 May and Singapore on 12 June, according to Screen International. In South Korea, the film opened on 27 June and attracted 1,016,928 cinema admissions. The film was subsequently released in Spain on 14 November 2003 under the title La maldición. Ju-On was given a limited theatrical release by Solar Films in the Philippines on 26 November 2003.

The film screened in the Midnight Madness programme at the Toronto International Film Festival in September 2003. The film was subsequently screened at the Leeds International Film Festival at Hyde Park Picture House on 3 October 2003.

In the United States, the film received a limited theatrical release on 23 July 2004. The American release grossed a total of $325,680 from 23 July to 9 December 2004.

=== Home media ===
In Japan, Ju-On: The Grudge was released on DVD on 25 July 2003 by Pioneer LDC. The initial limited-edition two-disc release included deleted scenes, an alternative ending accompanied by commentary from Takashi Shimizu, behind-the-scenes footage, cast interviews and comparisons between the director's storyboards and completed scenes. The film received its Japanese Blu-ray debut on 6 November 2014, when NBCUniversal Entertainment Japan released a limited three-film collection containing Ju-On: The Grudge, Ju-On: The Grudge 2 and Ju-On: The Beginning of the End.

In the United Kingdom, Premier Asia released the film on DVD on 4 October 2004. In 2022, Arrow Video released a limited Ju-On: The Grudge Collection, containing six films from the franchise. The edition featured a new 4K restoration of Ju-On: The Grudge from its original camera negative, presented on both Blu-ray and 4K Ultra HD Blu-ray. The restored film received a standalone 4K Ultra HD Blu-ray release on 22 January 2024.

In the United States, Lionsgate released the film on DVD on 9 November 2004. The disc included an audio commentary with Sam Raimi and Scott Spiegel, as well as interviews with the cast and crew. In the United States and Canada, Arrow Video released a limited-edition 4K Ultra HD Blu-ray on 11 August 2026. The release featured Arrow's restoration from the original camera negative, presented in Dolby Vision, alongside audio commentaries, interviews, deleted scenes and a collector's booklet.

== Reception ==
Rotten Tomatoes gives the film a rating of 83% based on six reviews, with an average rating of 5 out of 10. At Metacritic, a website which assigns a rating out of 100 for reviews from mainstream critics, the film has received an average score of 48, based on 22 reviews indicating "mixed or average reviews". The Washington Post gave the film a mixed reviewing, stating that it "isn't particularly scary. No, it's much harder on you than mere fright: It's ... creepy" and "it lacks any interest in conventional narrative and doesn't bother with hero or heroine, or with any sense of coherency, of any mechanism of solution of its mystery". David Kehr of The New York Times compared the film unfavourably to The Ring (1998), opining that Ju-on: The Grudge "turns into a rote series of killings, with each new sequence introduced by a title with the name of its primary victim. Because there is a new hero to identify with every 10 minutes, the viewer isn't drawn into a sustained suspense, but is merely subjected to a series of more or less foreseeable shocks". Kim Newman gave the film three stars out of five in Empire, noting that "as a film, it is at once too much a part of an overarching story and divided into too many episodes to be all of a piece. However, as a sustained collection of scare moments, it's a winner". Derek Elley compared the film unfavourably to both The Ring and Dark Water, writing that "in the end, The Grudge comes down to little more than when and where the ghostly little boy will next appear, and the final explanation is so-what".

The film's reception has changed to become more positive over time, with many fans and critics now frequently listing it as one of the greatest Japanese horror films ever made.

Some critics have identified loose connections between the story in the film and the traditional Japanese folktale Yotsuya Kaidan.

== Remake ==
In 2004, Sony Pictures Entertainment released an American remake of the film, titled The Grudge. Directed by Takashi Shimizu, the remake starred Sarah Michelle Gellar and Jason Behr. The remake follows a similar storyline to the original film, although its ending differs.

A further American installment, The Grudge, directed by Nicolas Pesce, was released in the United States on 3 January 2020. Rather than a remake or reboot, the film was designed as a separate story set within the same continuity as the 2004 film, with events taking place concurrently in the United States.

== See also ==
- List of ghost films
- List of horror films of 2002
- Yotsuya Kaidan, a traditional Japanese folktale featuring similarities to the Ju-On plot.
