= Kayoko Shibata =

Japanese actress, singer, and model

Kayoko Shibata (柴田 かよこ, Shibata Kayoko; born February 21, 1980 in Kanagawa Prefecture) is a Japanese actress, singer, and model. She is best known for her roles as Mariko in the film Ju-on and as Matsuri Tatsumi/GoPink in the tokusatsu Super Sentai television series Kyuukyuu Sentai GoGoFive, in which she was credited as Monika Sakaguchi (坂口 望二香, Sakaguchi Monika). She also reprised her role in two more occasions, first in the Super Sentai Crossover Film Timeranger Vs GogoFive and then in Episode 23 of the 35th Super Sentai Series Kaizoku Sentai Gokaiger.

== Filmography ==
- Kyuukyuu Sentai GoGoFive (1999) Matsuri Tatsumi/GoPink
- Kyuukyuu Sentai GoGoFive: Sudden Shock! A New Warrior (1999) Matsuri Tatsumi/GoPink
- Kyuukyuu Sentai GoGoFive Super Video: The Rescue Spirit Five Doctrines (1999) Matsuri Tatsumi/GoPink
- Kyuukyuu Sentai GoGoFive vs. Gingaman (2000) Matsuri Tatsumi/GoPink
- Mirai Sentai Timeranger vs. GoGoFive (2001) Matsuri Tatsumi/GoPink
- To Sing of Love (2002)
- Ju-on: The Grudge (2003) Mariko
- Bayside Shakedown 2 (2003)
- Chateau de Roses (2005) Rosemary
- Samurai Sentai Shinkenger (2009) (Episode 12) Kana (guest star)
- Kaizoku Sentai Gokaiger (2011) (Episode 23) Matsuri Tatsumi/GoPink
