= Yui Ichikawa =

Japanese idol and actress (born 1986)

- 市川 由衣
- Born: February 10, 1986 (age 40); Tokyo, Japan
- Occupations: Actress, singer, model
- Years active: 2001–present
- Spouse: Shigeyuki Totsugi (m. 2015)
- Children: 2
- Website: www.ken-on.co.jp/yui/

Yui Ichikawa (市川 由衣, Ichikawa Yui; born February 10, 1986) is an actress and model from Tokyo, Japan. She is also known by her nickname, Yui-nyan. As an actress she has appeared in several dramas (doramas), and in recent years she has concentrated more on her film career. She played a minor role in the movie Ju-on: The Grudge and reprised her character for a bigger role in the sequel, Ju-on: The Grudge 2. She has portrayed Nana Komatsu (Hachi) in the film adaptation of the famous manga Nana, and on December 18, 2006, Ichikawa and co-star Mika Nakashima went to New York City for the International Premier of Nana 2 at the IFC Center.

== Filmography ==
=== Films ===
Year	English Title	Japanese Title	Role	Notes	Ref(s):
2002	Ju-on: The Grudge	呪怨 THE MOVIE	Chiharu		
2003	Ju-on: The Grudge 2	呪怨2	Chiharu		
2004	Zebraman	ゼブラーマン	Midori Ichikawa		
2005	ZOO	ZOO	Rimiko		
2005	About Love	アバウト・ラブ／関於愛	Yuka		
2005	School Daze	スクールデイズ	Ayako Hayatsu		
2006	Forbidden Siren	サイレン	Yuki Amamoto	Lead role	
2006	Rough	ラフ ROUGH	Kaori Koyanagi		
2006	NANA 2	NANA 2	Nana Komatsu	Lead role	
2008	Onpun to Konbu	音符と昆布	Momo Kogure	Lead role	
2008	Kurosagi	クロサギ	Yukari Mishima		
2008	Hyakuhachi	ひゃくはち	–		
2014	Tokyo Tribe		Nori-chan		
2017	Traces of Sin	愚行録	Megumi Inamura		
2017	Alley Cat	アリーキャット	Saeko Tsuchiya		
2017	Moon and Lightning	月と雷	Yoshimura		
2023	Zom 100: Bucket List of the Dead	ゾン100 ゾンビになるまでにしたい100のこと			
2023	From the End of the World	世界の終わりから			

=== Television ===
Year	English Title	Japanese Title	Role
2001	Shibuyakei joshi Pro Race	渋谷系女子プロレス	herself
2002	Jikuu Keisatsu Wecker D-02	時空警察ヴェッカーD-02	Kana Goto
2002	Gokusen	ごくせん	Natsumi Sawada
2002	Taiho Shichauzo	逮捕しちゃうぞ	Yuka Kohashi
2003	Ju-on	呪怨	Chiharu
2003	Hotman	ホットマン	Hinata Furiya
2003	Ruton no Ouhi, Saigo no Koutei	流転の王妃・最後の皇弟	Kosei
2003	Yankee Bokou ni kaeru	ヤンキー母校に帰る	Yuki Touda
2004	Hotman '04 Spring Special	ホットマン'04春スペシャル	Hinata Furiya
2004	Tenkokuhe no Ouenka	天国への応援歌	Chiaki Shiraishi
2004	Wonderful Life	ワンダフルライフ	Touko Kitsuragi
2004	Hotman 2	ホットマン 2	Hinata Furiya
2005	H2~Kimi to itahibi	H2〜君といた日々	Hikari Amamiya
2005	Kikujirou Tosaki	菊次郎とさき	Yasuko Kitano
2005	Autorimitto	アウトリミット	Risa Morino
2006	Rondo	輪舞曲	Kotomi Kazama
2006	Ai to shi omitsumete	愛と死をみつめて	Hisako Oshima
2006	Kurosagi	クロサギ	Yukari Mishima
2006	Saigo no Nightingale	最後のナイチンゲール	Yasuko Taira
2006	Doubutsu 119	どうぶつ119	Narumi Koyama
2007	Detective School Q	探偵学園Q	Youko Mitsuno
2007	Sushi Ouji!	スシ王子!	Hikari Hayashida
2007	Suisei Monogatari	彗星物語	Kiyomi Shirota
2008	4 Shimai Tantei Dan	4姉妹探偵団	Tamami
2008	Kiri no Hi	霧の火	Nakajima Sakura
2009	RESCUE	RESCUE	Aoi Maezono
2011	Muscle Girl	マッスルガール!	Azusa Shiratori
2011	Bull Doctor	Episode 1	Saori Kurokawa
2014	Aoi Honō	アオイホノオ	Jun Iwase
2014	Gunshi Kanbei	軍師官兵衛	Otsuru
2024	Takasugi-san's Obento	高杉さん家のおべんとう	Reiko Kayama

=== Video game voicing ===
Year	English Title	Japanese Title	Role
2003	Chaos Legion	カオス レギオン	Arcia Rinslett
2008	Sands of Destruction	ワールド・デストラクション 〜導かれし意思〜	Rhi'a Dragunel

== Discography ==
=== Singles ===
Year	English Title	Japanese Title	Tracks	Ranking
2003	Ame	雨	4	-
2004	love letter	love letter	4	–
2004	Kira Kira	キラ・キラ	4	–
2004	Ai wa katsu	愛は勝つ	4	–

=== Albums ===
Year	English Title	Japanese Title	Tracks	Ranking
2004	i-pop mini	i-pop mini	8	–
