= Ju-On: The Grudge (video game) =

2009 video game

- Developer: feelplus
- Publishers: JP: AQ Interactive; NA: Xseed Games; EU: Rising Star Games
- Director: Takashi Shimizu
- Producer: Makoto Chiba
- Designer: Yuuki Sukekuni
- Programmers: Shuhei Osaku; Soichi Shimazu; Koji Omori
- Artist: Takamasa Ohsawa
- Series: Ju-On
- Platform: Wii
- Release: JP: July 30, 2009; NA: October 13, 2009; EU: October 30, 2009
- Genre: Survival horror
- Mode: Single-player

Ju-On: The Grudge, known in Japan as Kyōfu Taikan: Ju-On (Note: Japanese: 恐怖体感 呪怨, Hepburn: lit. Sensation of Fear: Ju-On), is a survival horror video game developed for the Wii. It was produced in honor of the Ju-On series' 10th anniversary. The game was directed by Takashi Shimizu, who also helmed the films. The game was developed by feelplus and published in Japan by AQ Interactive on July 30, 2009, and in North America and Europe in October of the same year by Xseed Games and Rising Star Games, respectively.

The game is centered on a family that moved into a cursed house. Several family members are playable characters and each story is viewed from the perspective of the character being played in scenarios called episodes. The game was panned by critics.

== Gameplay ==
An example of the player's dependence on the flashlight. Here, one of the game's onryō, Kayako Saeki, can be seen crawling into the player character's circle of visibility.

The Wii Remote is used to direct the player character's flashlight; however, rather than using the controller's infrared functionality, the games uses the Wii remote's accelerometer to guide the onscreen tool. Movement is executed by the Wii Remote's control pad and B Button, and the character is steered in the direction their flashlight is being held. The player is pressured not to remain in the same place for too long or move too slowly, as this will cause Kayako, the onryō to appear to the player. If there is a second Wii Remote synced to the console in the game's "courage test", each of the buttons on that controller can be used to trigger a unique scenario for the player to experience. The game also features a mechanic that measures the Wii Remote's movements during gameplay, so that the more the player flinches, the worse their success rate becomes.

As evidenced from the game's few teaser trailers, there were five stages expected to be playable in Ju-On: The Grudge: a warehouse, a hospital and a mannequin factory, in addition to an abandoned apartment complex and the Saeki residence. A blurb summarizing the game's plot implied that the warehouse would be the first playable level. In most cases, the flashlight provides the only means of visibility for the player, so it is necessary to replenish the power of the tool using batteries found throughout the level, which do not spawn in the same location with each play. If the flashlight runs out of batteries, Kayako will appear and attack the player which will result in a game-over. This battery power is displayed in the form of a meter on the lower-left corner of the heads-up display and acts like a health bar. If the game's lead specter Kayako Saeki takes hold of the player, the Wii Remote can be shaken to break her grip. Furthermore, when in Kayako's grip, her death rattle can be heard through the Wii Remote's speaker.

== Plot ==
The game claims that when a person dies with a deep and burning grudge, a curse is born. When an average housewife in Nerima, Japan, was murdered in a grisly fashion, it gave rise to a curse so powerful that it threatens to kill at a pace thought unimaginable before. The curse manifests on those who encounter the curse by any means, such as entering Saeki House or being in contact with somebody who is already cursed. Once Erika Yamada is exposed to the curse, while searching for her dog in an abandoned warehouse, the entire Yamada family is put in grave danger when she returns home. Each family member must face his or her individual challenge alone, and only by overcoming the curse together will the family become free again.

=== Run-down Factory ===
Erika's family moves into the Saeki home. While at home, the family dog, Ivy, runs off into an abandoned factory. Erika decides to venture into the factory to find Ivy. Erika soon comes across a broken-down elevator, which she restores power to. After entering the elevator, Ivy runs in and reunites with Erika. Kayako attacks but Ivy chases her off, and they escape the factory (but Ivy dies by protecting Erika). She calls the other members of her family, but no one answers. Erika heads home to find out what is going on.

=== Abandoned Hospital ===
Michiko ("Miki"), the mother of Erika, has been hospitalized for about a month. Occasionally, her children and husband go to visit her. One night, she wakes up in the hospital and notices a small boy (Toshio Saeki) running around. The phone is ringing, and all of the staff and patients seem to have disappeared. She ultimately makes her way to the roof of the hospital. Toshio tries to push Miki off of the roof, but fails. Then, Kayako appears, and she pushes Miki off of the roof and kills her.

=== Derelict Apartments ===
Kenji ("Ken"), a delivery boy, the brother of Erika, and son of Michiko, is on his way home from his delivery route, and sees a package on the sidewalk in front of three apartment buildings. The package is addressed to "Building 3 apartment 301", so he decides to deliver it. When he reaches his destination, the package turns into Kayako. Ken runs for his life while Kayako, with Toshio, chases him. Ken stops before the exit and turns around to see whether he is being followed, but no one is there. Just as he is about to leave, Kayako suddenly appears in front of Ken and kills him.

=== Security Guard's Ordeal ===
The father of the family, Hiroshi ("Hiro"), is working a late-night shift at a mannequin factory as a security guard. He notices a person wandering around on a security camera, and then the power goes out. After he restores the power, he begins to exit the building, but Kayako attacks and she kills him. An alternate ending shows the door opening and Kayako chasing Hiro and eventually kills him.

=== Cursed House ===
After surviving her ordeal, Erika makes it home. She and her family live at the same house where Takeo Saeki brutally murdered his wife and son. She finds that her house is abandoned, and Erika is locked and trapped inside by Kayako, forcing Erika to continue exploring the house. She is tormented by visions of her violently killed family still in the house, and then discovers her family's bodies in the attic. She is led downstairs by Ivy's barking (not realizing Ivy is dead). When she makes it downstairs, she realizes that the barking wasn't Ivy's, and it was used as a lure. Kayako crawls down the stairs, and she subdues Erika. Erika, powerless and unable to fight back, is dragged to the attic and killed. The last scene shows Erika dropping the flashlight, which had just run out of battery power.

== Development ==
A video game of the Ju-On series was confirmed in May 2009. Shortly afterwards, a demo of the game was unveiled at E3 2009, where Xseed Games described it as a "haunted house simulator", rather than a traditional survival horror game. The game does not feature any combat, as its format relies on subtle exploration and scare tactics. Joystiq reviewers who were present for the demo's screening at the E3 justified this, observing that "in most horror games, a skilled player can actually defeat the creatures (with notable exceptions like Silent Hill 2's Pyramid Head ...), making the game more of a power fantasy than a true fright. In both of these games [Silent Hill 2 and Ju-on: The Grudge], you can escape the creatures at best".

Xseed president Jun Iwasaki explained: "Ju-On: The Grudge makes quick scares accessible to anyone with a Wii, players can even hand the Wii Remote to their mother and enjoy watching her play and get scared". Rising Star Games' Yen Hau has also likened it to as close to an interactive horror movie. Xseed has attested that the game can be completed in less than ten hours. Developers allegedly paid a visit to the location where the Saeki residence scenes were filmed, so they could have a better idea of how to map the house for one of the game's stages.

== Reception ==
Reception

Aggregate scores
Aggregator	Score
GameRankings	40%
Metacritic	39/100

Review scores
Publication	Score
Famitsu	22/40
GameSpot	4/10
IGN	2.5/10

Ju-On: The Grudge has been notable for receiving negative reception from critics. Based on 32 reviews, the game holds a Metacritic score of 39/100 and 40% on GameRankings based on 27 reviews. Weekly Famitsu rated Ju-On: The Grudge at a 22 out of 40 from four reviewers, a week before the game was released in Japan. Also, GameSpot, giving the game a "Poor" 4, complained about the controls and the length of the game, while IGN also criticized the game for graphics, presentation and gameplay.
