= Gigolo Wannabe =

- Theatrical release poster
- ウォーターズ
- Directed by: Ryō Nishimura
- Screenplay by: Shunpei Okada
- Produced by: Seiji Yagi; Yu Hirose
- Starring: Shun Oguri; Riko Narumi; Sayaka Yamaguchi
- Cinematography: Naoki Kayano
- Edited by: Mototaka Kusakabe
- Music by: Jin Nakamura
- Distributed by: Gaga Communications
- Release date: March 11, 2006 (Japan)
- Running time: 107 minutes
- Country: Japan
- Language: Japanese

Gigolo Wannabe, also known as Waters (Japanese: ウォーターズ), is a Japanese comedy film, released March 11, 2006. It was directed by Ryō Nishimura, edited by Mototaka Kusakabe, sound recording by Iwakura Masayuki, music by Nakamura Jin "Boys♥Girls" by Kumi Koda, produced by Seiji Yagi and Yu Hirose, written by Okada Shunpei and Shiraishi Takurou; and starred Shun Oguri, Toshinobu Matsuo, Suga Takamasa, Hiroyuki Hirayama, Ryoji Morimoto, Yusuke Kirishima, Shingo Katsurayama, and Hitomi Manaka, and Riko Narumi.

== Summary ==
Waters is about seven young men who are desperate for quick money arrive at a desolate seaside bar, called Dog Days, to audition as "hosts". This is the highly popular occupation of entertaining female patrons with smooth talk and a soothing smile while offering them drinks at "host clubs". Although their previous jobs varied from street performer to ex-banker, they are all happy to get this dream job so easily, until they discover that the 'manager' has run off with their deposits! Upon seeing them so discouraged, the sympathetic bar owner offers his place for them to open up a host club by themselves. With the help of his granddaughter, Chika(who has a heart disorder), and despite the combination of their initial confusion, personal problems and a typhoon that almost blew the place down, they gradually find the true meaning of friendship, trust and love.
