= Kyuukyuu Sentai GoGoFive =

Japanese Tokusatsu television series

- The title card for Kyuukyuu Sentai GoGoFive
- Genre: Tokusatsu; Superhero fiction Science fiction
- Created by: Toei
- Developed by: Junki Takegami
- Directed by: Hajime Konaka
- Starring: Ryuichiro Nishioka; Masashi Taniguchi; Atsushi Harada; Kenji Shibata; Kayoko Shibata; Mike Maki; Yūko Miyamura; Kaya Hirasawa
- Narrated by: Daisuke Gōri
- Opening theme: "Kyuukyuu Sentai GoGoFive"; Performed by Shinichi Ishihara
- Ending theme: "Kono Hoshi o, Kono Machi o" Performed by Naritaka Takayama
- Composer: Toshiyuki Watanabe
- Country of origin: Japan
- Original language: Japanese
- No. of episodes: 50 (list of episodes)

Production
- Producers: Kenji Ōta (TV Asahi); Ken Fukuyoshi (TV Asahi); Jun Hikasa (Toei); Kōichi Yada (Toei Agency)
- Production location: Tokyo, Japan (Greater Tokyo Area)
- Running time: approx. 25 minutes
- Production companies: TV Asahi; Toei Agency; Toei Company

Original release
- Network: ANN (TV Asahi)
- Release: February 21, 1999 – February 6, 2000

Related
- Seijuu Sentai Gingaman; Mirai Sentai Timeranger

Kyuukyuu Sentai GoGoFive (救急戦隊ゴーゴーファイブ, Kyūkyū Sentai Gōgō Faibu; Rescue Squadron GoGoFive) (Note: Kyūkyū (救急) translates as "First aid" or "Emergency services". In the context of the show, it is normally translated as "Rescue". It is also a pun, as its premiere year of 1999 is often shortened to "99" which in Japanese is also read as "kyū kyū".) (Note: "Kyuukyuu Sentai GoGoFive" is also spelt as "Kyukyu Sentai GoGo-V".) is a Japanese Tokusatsu television series and the 23rd entry of the long-running Japanese Super Sentai metaseries. Its footage was used in the American television series Power Rangers Lightspeed Rescue. It aired from February 21, 1999, to February 6, 2000, replacing Seijuu Sentai Gingaman, and was replaced by Mirai Sentai Timeranger.

It was announced by Shout! Factory on January 9, 2018, that GoGoFive was to be released with English subtitles on DVD in North America. It was released on April 24, 2018. This is the 8th Super Sentai Series to be released on Region 1 DVD in North America. In August 2018, Shout! streamed the series on their website.

== Synopsis ==
Grandiene has been waiting for the moment she can manifest on Earth on the day when the planets are in the alignment of the Grand Cross, sending her children to make the preparations while making Earth into a realm of darkness for her. But Professor Mondo Tatsumi of the Tatsumi Disaster Prevention Research Center, while failing to convince his peers of this event despite his eminence, left his family to secretly develop the Rescue System to counter the threat by the Psyma Family. When the Psyma commence their attack in 1999, months before the Grand Cross is to occur, the Tatsumi siblings find themselves recruited by their estranged father to fight the demons as the GoGoFive team.

== Characters ==
The GoGoFive team transformed. From left to right: Matsuri, Shou, Matoi, Nagare, and Daimon Tatsumi.

=== GoGoFive ===
The five siblings of the Tatsumi family (巽家, Tatsumi-ke), which consist of four brothers and one sister, are from a long line of "machi-bikeshi" (firefighters of Edo, the capital of the Tokugawa Shogunate), and are portrayed as providing emergency and rescue services in Tokyo.

- Matoi Tatsumi (巽 マトイ, Tatsumi Matoi) (Note: The first names of the Tatsumi siblings and their father are written in kanji as 纏, 流水, 鐘, 大門, 祭, and 世界, respectively.) is the oldest of the Tatsumi siblings at 24 years old and the leader of the team who fights as Go Red (ゴーレッド, Gō Reddo).
- Nagare Tatsumi (巽 ナガレ, Tatsumi Nagare) is the second son of the Tatsumi family at 23 years old and the second-in-command of the team who fights as Go Blue (ゴーブルー, Gō Burū). He belongs to the Capital City Fire Department's Chemical Fire Fighting Brigade.
- Shou Tatsumi (巽 ショウ, Tatsumi Shō) is the third son of the family at 22 years old who fights as Go Green (ゴーグリーン, Gō Gurīn). He is a helicopter pilot in the Capital City Fire Department's Helicopter Brigade.
- Daimon Tatsumi (巽 ダイモン, Tatsumi Daimon) is the fourth and youngest son of the Tatsumi family at 21 years old who fights as Go Yellow (ゴーイエロー, Gō Ierō). He is a Capital Police Department (首都警察, Shuto Keisatsu) police officer.
- Matsuri Tatsumi (巽 マツリ, Tatsumi Matsuri) is the youngest child and only daughter of the Tatsumi family at 20 years old who fights as Go Pink (ゴーピンク, Gō Pinku). She is a National Seaside Hospital (国立臨海病院, Kokuritsu Rinkai Byōin) paramedic.

=== Allies ===
The allies of the series include:

- Mondo Tatsumi (巽 モンド, Tatsumi Mondo) is the father of the GoGoFive team and the scientist who created their suits, mecha, and weapons.
- Ritsuko Tatsumi (巽 律子, Tatsumi Ritsuko) is the mother of the GoGoFive team.
- Kyouko Hayase (速瀬 京子, Hayase Kyōko) is a shuttle pilot who is Shou's friend.
- Analyze Robot Mint (アナライズロボ・ミント, Anaraizu Robo Minto) is a cheery, childish analysis robot who controls the Five Liner at the Bay Area 55 base.
- Kenji Inui (乾 謙二, Inui Kenji) is the head of the Capital Fire Dept. and Mondo Tatsumi's frenemy, who ended up being in charge of funding the GoGoFive project.
- Juuma Hunter Zeek (獣魔ハンター・ジーク, Jūma Hantā Jīku; Clash! A New Warrior) was the last of people who had fought and defeated the Juuma. His people were mostly exterminated by the sole surviving Juuma; Golmois.

=== Psyma Family ===
The Psyma Family (災魔一族, Saima Ichizoku; Calamity Demon Family) is a family of demons whose only objective is destruction and intends to use the Grand Cross planet alignment to bring great calamity to Earth. The Family's matriarch, the Grand Witch Grandiene, hoped to travel to the real world by using the great amounts of "negative energy" that would emerge on Earth when the Grand Cross had formed. Her children, the Psyma Four Siblings, awaited her arrival, sending Psyma Beasts to destroy and finish off human civilization. They have their headquarters, the Demon Palace Psyma Paradico (魔宮サイマパラディコ, Makyū Saima Paradiko), at the North Pole.

- Grand Witch Grandiene (大魔女 グランディーヌ, Dai Majo Gurandīnu) is the leader of the Psyma Family and mother to the five siblings.
- Darkness King Gill (闇王 ギル, Yamiō Giru; GoGoFive vs. Gingaman) is the devil-themed true first-born son of the Psyma Family.
- Dark King Zylpheeza (冥王 ジルフィーザ, Meiō Jirufīza) is the eldest son of the Psyma Family and the demon of Aerial Calamity and Psyma Commander.
- Beast Baron Cobolda (獣男爵 コボルダ, Jū Danshaku Koboruda) is the second son of the Psyma Family, actually Grandiene's third born son, the Demon of Ground Calamity.
- Evil Spirit Princess Denus (邪霊姫 ディーナス, Jareiki Dīnasu) is Grandiene's only daughter in a Melusine-themed outfit and wings and only human-resembling child, the Demon of Aquatic Calamity.
- Dragon Prince Salamandes (龍皇子 サラマンデス, Ryū Ōji Saramandesu) is the youngest, formerly the third son Infant Demon Drop (童鬼 ドロップ, Dōki Doroppu) at the start of the series, the dragon-like Demon of Fire Calamity.
- Spell Master Pierre (呪士 ピエール, Jushi Piēru; 2–50 & Timeranger vs. GoGoFive) is the family butler and a housefly-themed sorcerer who handles the Psyma Cards, being able to create and resurrect the defeated Psyma Beasts.
- Juuma King Golmois (獣魔王 ゴルモア, Jūmaō Gorumoa; Clash! A New Warrior) is the leader of the Juuma Family (獣魔一族, Jūma Ichizoku; Beast Demon Family), a race of demons as evil as the Psyma from another galaxy.
- The Spirit-Servants Imps (使い魔 インプス, Tsukaima Inpusu) are imp/bat-like foot soldiers, armed with short swords. The Imps could become mecha-sized when in the Psyma Zone.
  - The Imps Bodyguards (インプス親衛隊, Inpusu Shin'eitai) are a group of female Imps who serve Denus, with one destroyed by Denus and the other two destroyed by GoGoFive. Pierre revives them as one giant Imp that then divides to become three clones. These clones are destroyed by Max Victory Robo.
- The Grim Reapers (闇の亡者, Yami no Mōja; GoGoFive vs. Gingaman) are the namesake foot soldiers of Darkness King Gill that came from the Dark Hell. While they have nigh-invulnerability, their only weakness is the Gingamen's Earth Power.

==== Psyma Beasts ====
The Psyma Beasts (サイマ獣, Saimajū) are the demons that the Psyma family use to attack humans. They start out as cards detailing information about them and Pierre throws the card into the World of Darkness where he says an incantation to bring the Psyma Beast to life. When a Psyma Beast is destroyed, Pierre throws a Regeneration Card on them which makes them grow. The Golem Cards can be used to turn a defeated Psyma Beast into a Golem Psyma Beast.

Each of the Psyma Family members have their own Psyma Beasts.

===== Zylpheeza's Psyma Beasts =====
The following Psyma Beasts were used by Zylpheeza and have abilities like aerial attacks, electrokinesis, gas attacks, and wind attacks:

- Tornado Psyma Beast Tornedeus (竜巻サイマ獣トルネデウス, Tatsumaki Saimajū Torunedeusu; 2): A horned bat-themed demon with a swirling torso and limbs that can create massive tornadoes as well as protect itself by hiding inside them. Killed by Victory Robo.
- Lightning Rod Psyma Beast Raima (雷針サイマ獣ライマ, Raishin Saimajū Raima; 8): A thunder-based skeleton/thunder god-themed demon that could shoot spikes from its body. These spikes acted as lightning rods. Killed by Victory Robo.
- Smog Psyma Beast Chanbaano (黒煙サイマ獣チャンバーノ, Kokuen Saimajū Chambāno; 10, 42): A motorcycle-riding barnacle/conch Psyma Beast that emitted poisonous smoke from the pipes and smoke stacks on its body. Killed by Victory Robo. Later summoned by Chaos when he and Salamandes brought the GoGoFive to Hell but Chaos lost control when his staff was broken. Escaped from Hell and was killed again by Grand Liner.
- Computer Psyma Beast Cyber Gildo (電脳サイマ獣 サイバギルド, Dennō Saimajū Saibagirudo; 14, 42-43): A cyborg devil-like Psyma that could drain and absorb electricity causing power outages. Killed by Victory Robo. Later summoned by Chaos when he and Salamandes brought the GoGoFive to Hell but Chaos lost control when his staff was broken. His soul was swallowed by Salamandes in order to escape from Hell.
- Reward Psyma Beast Garaga (ご褒美サイマ獣ガラガ, Gohōbi Saimajū Garaga; 16): A comical crow Psyma Beast that was created by Pierre from one of Zylpheeza's cards to find Denus' stolen demon egg. Killed by the Live Bird. Revived by Pierre as Golem Garaga (ゴーレムガラガ, Gōremu Garaga, 16) who sports knight-like armor. Killed by Grand Liner.
- Tactical Psyma Beast Spiderus (策士サイマ獣スパイダラス, Sakushi Saimajū Supaidarasu; 18, 42-43): A spider-themed Psyma Beast created by Zylpheeza that could trap humans in strong webs and could analyze the GoGoFive's weaponry. However, the Rangers were able to beat him with the V-Lancers, since it could not analyze them. Killed by Victory Robo. Was later summoned by Chaos when he and Salamandes brought the GoGoFive to Hell, but Chaos lost control when his staff was broken. His soul was swallowed by Salamandes in order for him to escape from Hell. His face also appears on the queen's skirt.
- Hades Demon Warriors (冥界魔闘士, Meikai Matōshi; 19-22): Zylpheeza's most powerful creatures. When each dies, Zylpheeza gathers the gem that remains of them. He uses the gems to create Combined Beast Chimera (合成獣 キマイラー, Gōseijū Kimairā; 22), who possessing the powers of all three Demon Warriors. They were killed for good by the V-Mode Attack Bracelets.
  - Zword (ゾード, Zōdo; 19-20): The leader of the three. A knight-like warrior, who Matoi risked his life against, by aiming both the Live Bird and his V-Lancer at the demon. When he was revived as a giant, he had a new form. Killed by Grand Liner and Victory Robo, after Zword had severed Victory Robo's right arm. The gem that remained of him was used to create the center face and right arm of Chimera.
  - Jiin (ジーン, Jīn; 19-21): The youngest of the three, a peregrine falcon-themed psycho who treated hunting the GoGoFive as a game. Zylpheeza later used a Golem Card on Jiin so that he can help Ghoul as he gains a draconic appearance with knight-like armor. Killed by the Liner Boy. The gem that remained of him was used to create the right face and legs of Chimera.
  - Ghoul (グール, Gūru; 19-21): The middle child sibling and quite possibly the strongest, a green, muscular Viking/ghoul-themed monster. Killed by the Liner Boy and Grand Liner with an emerald being all that remains of him. The emerald is used to create the left face and arm of Chimera.
- Ceremonal Psyma Beast Halleluyan (司祭サイマ獣ハレルヤン, Shisai Saimajū Hareruyan; 25, 42-43): A Kannushi/squid-themed Psyma Beast created from one of Zylpheeza's cards who prepares the events of Grandiene's arrival, on the day of the Grand Cross conjunction of planets. He draws the magic circle to receive her. However, just before her arrival was complete, Dr. Tatsumi destroyed the magic circle, as Halleluyan was killed, so that Grandiene only made it halfway into our world. Killed by Max Victory Robo. Later summoned by Chaos when he and Salamandes brought the GoGoFive to Psyma Hell, but Chaos lost control when his staff was broken. His soul was swallowed by Salamandes in order for him to escape from Hell.
- Endurance Saima Beast Garubaria (忍耐力サイマ獣ガルバリア, Nintai Saimajū Garubaria, 37): A pig/gladiator Psyma beast who sports a mohawk.

===== Cobolda's Psyma Beasts =====
The following Psyma Beasts were used by Cobolda and specialize in brute force tactics and seismic abilities:

- Ground Saima Beast Magma Golem (岩石サイマ獣 マグマゴレム, Ganseki Saimajū Maguma Goremu; 1, 11, 12 & 28): A lava golem-themed Psyma Beast. While supposedly defeated by Victory Robo, it was reawakened in its Golem form by Grandiene where it appears to be more fiery. Upon being destroyed by the Grand Liner, some of Magma Golem's fragments were salvaged by Pierre who converted them into Golem Cards.
- Earthquake Saima Beast Quakeross (地震サイマ獣クエイクロス, Jishin Saimajū Kueikurosu; 5, 42-43): A tree-themed Psyma Beast.
- Excavation Saima Beast Moleghoul (掘削サイマ獣モルグール, Kussaku Saimajū Morugūru; 7, 42-43): An antlion/Japanese dry garden-themed Psyma Beast.
- Violent Food Saima Beast Juuki (暴食サイマ獣ジュウキ, Bōshoku Saimajū Jūki; 13, 42): A dinosaur fossil-themed Psyma Beast with a skeletal dragon-like head for a right hand. When revived as Golem Juuji, his skeletal dragon head is replaced with a clawed hand, his horns become longer, and sports wing-like structures on his back.
- Earth Vibration Psyma Beast Ganemuuja (地響きサイマ獣ガネムージャ, Jihibiki Saimajū Ganemūja; 17): An elephant-themed Psyma Beast with a mouth at the end of its trunk.
- Tomb Profanation Psyma Beast Zombeast (墓荒らしサイマ獣ゾンビースト, Haka Arashi Saimajū Zonbīsuto; 23, 42-43): A mummy-themed Psyma Beast.
- Archery Psyma Beast Doguru (弓術サイマ獣ドグル, Kyūjutsu Saimajū Doguru; 27): A mole-themed Psyma Beast with archery skills.
- Card Psyma Beast Godai (カードサイマ獣ゴダイ, Kādo Saimajū Godai; 32): A Mokumokuren-themed Psyma Beast.
- Fighting Saima Beast Spartan (格闘技サイマ獣スパルタン, Kakutōgi Saimajū Suparutan, 36, 42-43): A Cyclops/professional wrestler-themed Psyma Beast.
- Exploding Insect Psyma Beast Hirugemuuja (爆弾虫サイマ獣ヒルゲムージャ, Bakudanchū Saimajū Hirugemūja; 40): A caterpillar-themed Psyma Beast.

===== Denus' Psyma Beasts =====
The following Psyma Beasts were used by Denus and specialize in corrosive attacks, life-draining abilities, liquid attacks, manipulation, sabotage, stealth, and subterfuge:

- Bomb Saima Beast Gasgail (爆発弾サイマ獣ガスガイル, Bakuhatsudan Saimajū Gasugairu; 3): A slug-themed Psyma Beast.
- Corrosion Psyma Beast Jeeruda (溶解液サイマ獣ジェルーダ, Yōkaieki Saimajū Jerūda; 6): A moth-headed jellyfish-themed Psyma Beast.
- Power Absortion Psyma Beast Vampaira (吸力サイマ獣バンパイラ, Kyūryoku Saimajū Banpaira; 9): A gold beak-masked vampire bat-themed Psyma Beast.
- Child Transformation Psyma Beast Zairen (幼化サイマ獣ザイレン, Yōka Saimajū Zairen; 24, 42-43): A siren/mermaid-themed Psyma Beast with fish fin-shaped wings. When revived as Golem Zairen, she sports a more fish-like head and sports a fish tail-shaped sickle for a right hand.
- Soft Body Psyma Beast Deathmine (軟体サイマ獣デスマイン, Nantai Saimajū Desumain; 28): A Grim Reaper/octopus-themed Psyma Beast.
- Death Warrior Psyma Beast Thanatos (死神戦士サイマ獣タナトス, Shinigami Senshi Saimajū Tanatosu; 33): A killer whale-themed Psyma Beast.
- Rake Psyma Beast Gabara (熊手サイマ獣ガバラ, Kumade Saimajū Gabara; 41): A Kappa-themed Psyma Beast.

===== Drop/Salamandres' Psyma Beasts =====
The following Psyma Beasts were used by Drop/Salamandres and specialize in destructive offenses, energy-draining abilities, explosive attacks, and fire attacks:

- Dark Sword Saima Beast Solgoil (暗黒魔剣サイマ獣ソルゴイル, Ankoku Maken Saimajū Sorugoiru; 4, 42): A gargoyle/crab-themed Psyma Beast.
- Flame Saima Beast Hellgerus (火炎サイマ獣ヘルゲロス, Kaen Saimajū Herugerosu; 11-12): A three-headed dragon-themed Psyma Beast. When revived as Golem Hellgerus, he gains rock-like armor, a double-bladed sword, and an attack that shifts from fire to lightning.
- Supersonic Psyma Beast Buroogen (超音波サイマ獣ブローゲン, Chōonpa Saimajū Burōgen; 15, 42-43): A moth/cicada-themed Psyma Beast. When revived as Golem Buroogen, he gained a fiery moth-like head, sports different wings, and has a bladed weapon in place of his right hand.
- Search Psyma Beast Death Stag (探索サイマ獣デスタグ, Tansaku Saimajū Desu Stagu; 26, 42-43): A stag beetle-themed Psyma Beast.
- Manipulation Psyma Beast Papetongu (操りサイマ獣パペトング, Ayatsuri Saimajū Papetongu; 29, 42 & 43): A man-eating plant/flower-themed Psyma Beast.
- Absorption Psyma Beast Vacuuma (吸引サイマ獣バキューマ, Kyūin Saimajū Bakyūma; 31, 42-43): A cobra-themed Psyma Beast.
- Pollen Psyma Beast Baira (花粉サイマ獣バイラ, Kafun Saimajū Baira; 34): A rafflesia/ivy-themed Psyma Beast.
- Bushido Psyma Beast Hagakuren (武士道サイマ獣ハガクレン, Bushidō Saimajū Hagakuren, 38): A mantis-themed Psyma Beast.
- Dragon Warrior Psyma Beast Lizardes (龍戦士サイマ獣リザーデス, Ryū Senshi Saimajū Rizādesu; 39): A fire-breathing dragon/lizard-themed Psyma Beast.
- Dream Vision Saima Beast Bahamuu (夢幻サイマ獣バハムー, Mugen Saimajū Bahamū; 45): A Baku/catfish-themed Psyma Beast.

===== Other Psyma Beasts =====
- Spiritworld Guard Saima Chaos (幽界衛兵災魔 カオス, Yūkai Eihei Saima Kaosu; 42-43): A sorcerer-themed Psyma Beast with a demonic lion/oni-shaled left shoulder who is the gatekeeper of Ghost Psyma Hell.

== Episodes ==
No.	Title	Directed by	Written by	Original release date
1	"Rescue Soldiers! Rise Up"; Transliteration: "Kyūkyū Senshi! Tatsu" (Japanese: 救急戦士！起(た)つ)	Hajime Konaka	Junki Takegami	February 21, 1999
2	"The Psyma Family Tornado!"; Transliteration: "Tatsumaku Saima Ichizoku!" (Japanese: 竜巻く災魔一族！)	Hajime Konaka	Junki Takegami	February 28, 1999
3	"Explosive Bonds"; Transliteration: "Bakuha Sareta Kizuna" (Japanese: 爆破された兄弟愛(きずな))	Katsuya Watanabe	Junki Takegami	March 7, 1999
4	"Flower Petals in Abnormal Weather"; Transliteration: "Hanabira ni Ijō Kishō" (Japanese: 花びらに異常気象)	Katsuya Watanabe	Junichi Miyashita	March 14, 1999
5	"Time to Become a Hero"; Transliteration: "Hīrō ni Naru Toki" (Japanese: ヒーローになる時)	Takao Nagaishi	Junki Takegami	March 21, 1999
6	"The Mold Cometh!"; Transliteration: "Kabi ga Kuru!" (Japanese: カビが来る！)	Takao Nagaishi	Yasuko Kobayashi	March 28, 1999
7	"The Beautiful Psyma's Trap"; Transliteration: "Utsukushiki Saima no Wana" (Japanese: 美しき災魔のワナ)	Hajime Konaka	Junki Takegami	April 4, 1999
8	"Rescue Sentai Activity Suspended"; Transliteration: "Kyūkyū Sentai Katsudō Teishi" (Japanese: 救急戦隊活動停止)	Hajime Konaka	Yasuko Kobayashi	April 11, 1999
9	"Stolen Powers"; Transliteration: "Nusumareta Chikara!" (Japanese: 盗まれた能力(ちから)！)	Katsuya Watanabe	Junichi Miyashita	April 18, 1999
10	"Proud Yellow"; Transliteration: "Hokori no Ierō" (Japanese: 誇りのイエロー)	Katsuya Watanabe	Ryōta Yamaguchi	April 25, 1999
11	"The Two Red-Hot Psyma Beasts"; Transliteration: "Shakunetsu no Ni Dai Saimajū" (Japanese: 灼熱の2大災魔獣)	Takao Nagaishi	Junki Takegami	May 2, 1999
12	"The Do-or-Die New Coupling Fusion"; Transliteration: "Kesshi no Shin Renketsu Gattai" (Japanese: 決死の新連結合体)	Takao Nagaishi	Junki Takegami	May 9, 1999
13	"The Younger Siblings' Rebellion"; Transliteration: "Otōto-tachi no Hanran" (Japanese: 弟たちの反乱)	Hajime Konaka	Yasuko Kobayashi	May 16, 1999
14	"The Dreadful Virus"; Transliteration: "Kyōfu no Uirusu" (Japanese: 恐怖のウイルス)	Hajime Konaka	Junichi Miyashita	May 23, 1999
15	"Infant Demon Drop's Sortie"; Transliteration: "Dōki Doroppu Shutsugeki" (Japanese: 童鬼ドロップ出撃)	Satoshi Morota	Ryōta Yamaguchi	May 30, 1999
16	"The Thief and the Psyma Egg"; Transliteration: "Dorobō to Saima no Tamago" (Japanese: 泥棒とサイマの卵)	Satoshi Morota	Yasuko Kobayashi	June 6, 1999
17	"Matoi's Bridal Candidate"; Transliteration: "Matoi no Hanayome Kōho" (Japanese: マトイの花嫁候補)	Takao Nagaishi	Junichi Miyashita	June 13, 1999
18	"The Counterattacking V-Lancers"; Transliteration: "Gyakushū no Bui Ransā" (Japanese: 逆襲のVランサー)	Takao Nagaishi	Junki Takegami	June 27, 1999
19	"A Total Defeat"; Transliteration: "Kanzen Naru Haiboku" (Japanese: 完全なる敗北)	Hajime Konaka	Yasuko Kobayashi	July 4, 1999
20	"Undying Rescue Spirits"; Transliteration: "Fumetsu no Resukyū-damashii" (Japanese: 不滅の救急(レスキュー)魂)	Hajime Konaka	Yasuko Kobayashi	July 11, 1999
21	"The New 6th Soldier!"; Transliteration: "Roku-banme no Shin Senshi!" (Japanese: 6番目の新戦士！)	Katsuya Watanabe	Junki Takegami	July 18, 1999
22	"The Dark King's Last Decisive Battle"; Transliteration: "Meiō, Saigo no Kessen" (Japanese: 冥王、最後の決戦)	Katsuya Watanabe	Junki Takegami	July 25, 1999
23	"The Ghost Rescue Mission"; Transliteration: "Yūrei Kyūshutsu Sakusen" (Japanese: 幽霊救出作戦)	Takao Nagaishi	Junichi Miyashita	August 1, 1999
24	"Little Kid Rescue Soldiers"; Transliteration: "Chibikko Kyūkyū Senshi" (Japanese: ちびっ子救急戦士)	Takao Nagaishi	Ryōta Yamaguchi	August 8, 1999
25	"The Great Witch's Hour of Descent"; Transliteration: "Dai Majo Kōrin no Toki" (Japanese: 大魔女降臨の時)	Satoshi Morota	Junki Takegami	August 15, 1999
26	"The Fiery Dragon Prince's Birth"; Transliteration: "Honō no Ryū Ōji Tanjō" (Japanese: 炎の龍皇子誕生)	Satoshi Morota	Junki Takegami	August 22, 1999
27	"Yellow Leaves the Front"; Transliteration: "Ierō Sensen Ridatsu" (Japanese: イエロー戦線離脱)	Hajime Konaka	Yasuko Kobayashi	August 29, 1999
28	"The Kidnapped Boy!"; Transliteration: "Ubawareta Bōi!" (Japanese: 奪われたボーイ！)	Hajime Konaka	Ryōta Yamaguchi	September 5, 1999
29	"The Foreboding Starry Sky"; Transliteration: "Munasawagi no Hoshizora" (Japanese: 胸騒ぎの星空)	Hiroshi Butsuda	Junki Takegami	September 12, 1999
30	"Escape! The Dark Planet"; Transliteration: "Dasshutsu! Ankoku Wakusei" (Japanese: 脱出！暗黒惑星)	Hiroshi Butsuda	Junki Takegami	September 19, 1999
31	"Cut Down the Psyma Zone"; Transliteration: "Kirisake Saima Zōn" (Japanese: 切り裂け災魔空間(ゾーン))	Takao Nagaishi	Junichi Miyashita	September 26, 1999
32	"Wedding Bells"; Transliteration: "Wedingu Beru" (Japanese: ウェディングベル)	Takao Nagaishi	Yasuko Kobayashi	October 3, 1999
33	"An Innocent Psyma Warrior"; Transliteration: "Ubu na Saima no Senshi" (Japanese: ウブな災魔の戦士)	Katsuya Watanabe	Junki Takegami	October 10, 1999
34	"Death, Else Destruction"; Transliteration: "Shi Samo Nakuba Hametsu" (Japanese: 死さもなくば破滅)	Katsuya Watanabe	Yasuko Kobayashi	October 17, 1999
35	"The Black Snake's Trap"; Transliteration: "Kuroi Hebi no Torappu" (Japanese: 黒い蛇のトラップ)	Satoshi Morota	Junichi Miyashita	October 24, 1999
36	"Secret Art! The Tornado Drop"; Transliteration: "Ōgi! Tatsumaki Otoshi" (Japanese: 奥義！竜巻落とし)	Satoshi Morota	Ryōta Yamaguchi	October 31, 1999
37	"The Beauty is a Psyma Beast!?"; Transliteration: "Bijo ga Saimajū!?" (Japanese: 美女がサイマ獣!?)	Hajime Konaka	Junki Takegami	November 7, 1999
38	"The Infinity Chain, Grandchildren, and Persimmons"; Transliteration: "Mugen Rensa to Mago to Kaki" (Japanese: 無限連鎖と孫と柿)	Hajime Konaka	Junki Takegami	November 14, 1999
39	"Break the Infinity Chain!"; Transliteration: "Mugen Rensa o Tate!" (Japanese: 無限連鎖を断て！)	Katsuya Watanabe	Ryōta Yamaguchi	November 21, 1999
40	"Zero Seconds To Base Destruction"; Transliteration: "Kichi Kaimetsu Zero-byō Mae" (Japanese: 基地壊滅0秒前)	Katsuya Watanabe	Junichi Miyashita	November 28, 1999
41	"The Man Matoi Could Not Beat"; Transliteration: "Matoi ga Maketa Otoko" (Japanese: マトイが負けた男)	Satoshi Morota	Yasuko Kobayashi	December 5, 1999
42	"The Hellish Psyma Beast Army"; Transliteration: "Jigoku no Saimajū Gundan" (Japanese: 地獄の災魔獣軍団)	Satoshi Morota	Junki Takegami	December 12, 1999
43	"The Terrible Psyma Tree"; Transliteration: "Senritsu no Saima Tsurī" (Japanese: 戦慄の災魔ツリー)	Hajime Konaka	Junki Takegami	December 19, 1999
44	"Rescue File 99"; Transliteration: "Kyūkyū Fairu Kyūjū-kyū" (Japanese: 救急ファイル99)	Hajime Konaka	Ryōta Yamaguchi	December 26, 1999
45	"The Year's First Dream is a Psyma Melody"; Transliteration: "Hatsuyume wa Saima no Merodi" (Japanese: 初夢は災魔の旋律(メロディ))	Katsuya Watanabe	Ryōta Yamaguchi	January 2, 2000
46	"The Flame-Throwing Firefighter Robo"; Transliteration: "Honō o Fuku Shōbō Robo" (Japanese: 火を吹く消防ロボ)	Katsuya Watanabe	Yasuko Kobayashi	January 9, 2000
47	"The Dark King! The Cost of Revival"; Transliteration: "Meiō! Fukkatsu no Daishō" (Japanese: 冥王！復活の代償)	Takao Nagaishi	Junki Takegami	January 16, 2000
48	"The Showdown is at the Psyma Paradico"; Transliteration: "Kessen wa Saima Paradiko" (Japanese: 決戦は災魔宮殿(パラディコ))	Takao Nagaishi	Junki Takegami	January 23, 2000
49	"Awakening! Two Destructive Gods"; Transliteration: "Kakusei! Ni Dai Hakaishin" (Japanese: 覚醒！二大破壊神)	Hajime Konaka	Junki Takegami	January 30, 2000
50 (Finale)	"Burning Rescue Spirits"; Transliteration: "Moeru Resukyū-damashii" (Japanese: 燃える救急(レスキュー)魂)	Hajime Konaka	Junki Takegami	February 6, 2000

=== Direct-to-video releases ===
- Kyuukyuu Sentai GoGoFive: Clash! A New Warrior (救急戦隊ゴーゴーファイブ 激突!新たなる超戦士, Kyūkyū Sentai Gōgō Faibu Gekitotsu! Aratanaru Chō Senshi) (1999): This movie occurs between missions 18 and 19 due to the inclusion of Zylpheeza (who the team met in 18) and Drop being awake (Drop suddenly goes to sleep in 19).
- Kyuukyuu Sentai GoGoFive Super Video: The Rescue Spirit Five Doctrines (救急戦隊ゴーゴーファイブ スーパービデオ レスキューだましい 五つのおしえ, Kyūkyū Sentai Gōgō Faibu Sūpā Bideo Resukyū-damashii Itsutsu no Oshie) (1999)
- Kyuukyuu Sentai GoGoFive vs. Gingaman (救急戦隊ゴーゴーファイブVSギンガマン, Kyūkyū Sentai Gōgō Faibu Tai Gingaman) (2000): This movie occurs between missions 31 and 32 because of the use of Victory Mars (full use in 31) and Salamandes being alive and supported by Grandiene (Salamandes changes in 42).
- Mirai Sentai Timeranger vs. GoGoFive (未来戦隊タイムレンジャーVSゴーゴーファイブ, Mirai Sentai Taimu Renjā Tai Gōgō Faibu) (2001)

== Cast ==
- Matoi Tatsumi: Ryuichiro Nishioka (西岡 竜一朗, Nishioka Ryūichirō)
- Nagare Tatsumi: Masashi Taniguchi (谷口 賢志, Taniguchi Masashi)
- Shou Tatsumi: Atsushi Harada (原田 篤, Harada Atsushi)
- Daimon Tatsumi: Kenji Shibata (柴田 賢志, Shibata Kenji)
- Matsuri Tatsumi: Kayoko Shibata (柴田 かよこ, Shibata Kayoko)
- Mondo Tatsumi: Mike Maki (マイク 眞木, Maiku Maki)
- Kyouko Hayase: Yūko Miyamura (宮村 優子, Miyamura Yūko)
- Ritsuko Tatsumi: Kyoko Yoshizawa (吉沢 京子, Yoshizawa Kyōko)
- Kenji Inui: Takushi Iwao (岩尾 拓志, Iwao Takushi)
- Denus: Kaya Hirasawa (平沢 草, Hirasawa Kaya)

=== Voice cast ===
- Mint: Sayaka Aida (相田 さやか, Aida Sayaka)
- Liner Boy (ライナーボーイ, Rainā Bōi): Isao Yamagishi (山岸 功, Yamagishi Isao)
- Grandiene: Miho Yamada (山田 美穂, Yamada Miho)
- Zylpheeza: Daiki Nakamura (中村 大樹, Nakamura Daiki)
- Cobolda: Kenji Nomura (乃村 健次, Nomura Kenji)
- Drop: Yūko Miyamura (Played as Yūnosuke Yamimura (闇村 悠ノ介, Yamimura Yūnosuke))
- Salamandes: Hikaru Midorikawa (緑川 光, Midorikawa Hikaru)
- Pierre: Taiki Matsuno (松野 太紀, Matsuno Taiki)
- Narration: Daisuke Gōri (郷里 大輔, Gōri Daisuke)

=== Spin-off cast ===
- Zeek (Clash! A New Warrior): Keiichi Wada (和田 圭市, Wada Keiichi)
- Golmois (Voice; Clash! A New Warrior): Tetsu Inada (稲田 徹, Inada Tetsu)
- Gill (Voice; GoGoFive vs. Gingaman): Ryūzaburō Ōtomo (大友 龍三郎, Ōtomo Ryūzaburō)

== Songs ==
Opening theme

- "Kyuukyuu Sentai GoGoFive" (救急戦隊ゴーゴーファイブ, Kyūkyū Sentai Gōgō Faibu)
  - Lyrics: Nagae Kuwabara (桑原 永江, Kuwabara Nagae)
  - Composition & Arrangement: Toshiyuki Watanabe (渡辺 俊幸, Watanabe Toshiyuki)
  - Artist: Shinichi Ishihara (石原 慎一, Ishihara Shin'ichi)

Ending theme

- "Kono Hoshi o, Kono Machi o" (この星を この街を; "This Planet, This City")
  - Lyrics: Shoko Fujibayashi (藤林 聖子, Fujibayashi Shōko)
  - Composition: Shinsuke Kazato (風戸 慎介, Kazato Shinsuke)
  - Arrangement: Toshihiko Sahashi (佐橋 俊彦, Sahashi Toshihiko)
  - Artist: Naritaka Takayama (高山 成孝, Takayama Naritaka)
