= Ju-On: Origins =

Japanese horror television series

- Promotional poster
- Genre: Horror; Mystery; Drama
- Based on: Ju-On by Takashi Shimizu
- Written by: Hiroshi Takahashi; Takashige Ichise
- Directed by: Sho Miyake
- Starring: Yoshiyoshi Arakawa; Yuina Kuroshima; Ririka; Koki Osamura; Seiko Iwaido; Kai Inowaki; Ryushin Tei; Yuya Matsuura; Kaho Tsuchimura; Tokio Emoto; Nobuko Sendo; Kana Kurashina
- Composer: Kuniaki Haishima
- Country of origin: Japan
- Original language: Japanese
- No. of seasons: 1
- No. of episodes: 6

Production
- Executive producers: Toshinori Yamaguchi; Kazutaka Sakamoto
- Producers: Takashige Ichise; Mikihiko Hirata
- Editor: Yoshifumi Fukazawa
- Camera setup: Hidetoshi Shinomiya
- Running time: 26–31 minutes
- Production company: W Field

Original release
- Network: Netflix
- Release: July 3, 2020

Ju-On: Origins (呪怨：呪いの家, Ju-On: Noroi no Ie) is a Japanese horror television miniseries based on the Ju-On franchise. The series premiered on Netflix on 3 July 2020.

== Cast and characters ==
- Yoshiyoshi Arakawa as Yasuo Odajima
  - Ouka Katou as Yasuo Odajima (5 years old)
- Yuina Kuroshima as Haruka Honjo
- Seiko Iwaido as the Woman in White
- Koki Osamura as Yudai Katsuragi/Katsuji Kobayashi
- Ririka as Kiyomi Kawai/Kumi Shigematsu
- Nana Owada as Yoshie Minakami
- Hitomi Hazuki as Mai Hyodo
- Kaho Tsuchimura as Manami Kuze
- Kana Kurashina as Kimie Ariyasu
- Harmeet Obhrai as Abdallah
- Atsuki Yamada as Toshiki Shigematsu
- Kai Inowaki as Tetsuya Fukazawa
- Takemi Fujii as Yuka Tsujii
- Izumi Matsuoka as Mina Kawai
- Tomomitsu Adachi as Takumi Noguchi
- Nobuko Sendo as Michiko Fukazawa
- Ryota Matsushima as Keiichi Masaki
- Shinsuke Kato as Nobuhiko Haida
- Nana Yanagisawa as Keiko Haida
- Ryushin Tei as Tamotsu Kosaka
- Jui Nogimoto as Kazuha Odajima
- Shiyun Nakamura as Atsushi Sasaki
- Tokio Emoto as M
- Haruka Kubo as Chie Masaki
- Yuya Matsuura as Kokichi Odajima
- Noriaki Kamata as Noriyasu Sako
- Remi Niinai as Natsuki Ito
- Atom Shukugawa as Yusaku Morozumi
- Yura Anno as Tomoko Morozumi
- Yoshiki Urayama as Hiroshi Sunada
- Mihiro as Assistant to TV Show Host

== Episodes ==
No.	Title	Directed by	Written by	Original release date
1	"Episode 1"	Sho Miyake	Hiroshi Takahashi, Takashige Ichise	July 3, 2020
In 1988, paranormal investigator Yasuo Odajima appears in a talk show featuring actress Haruka Honjo, who relates a personal experience with the supernatural. Haruka's boyfriend, Tetsuya Fukazawa, also recounts visiting a haunted house whilst trying to scout a new home for their marriage. There, Tetsuya encounters the ghost of a woman in white carrying a baby and he believes his encounter caused Haruka to be haunted. High school student Kiyomi Kawai transfers to a new school upon the urging of her abusive mother, Mina. Kiyomi is invited by her newfound friends, Yoshie Minakami and Mai Hyodo, to go to the same house visited by Tetsuya. The girls are joined by Yudai Katsuragi, a male student from a neighboring school. Yoshie and Mai then pin Kiyomi down so she could be raped by Yudai.
2	"Episode 2"	Sho Miyake	Hiroshi Takahashi, Takashige Ichise	July 3, 2020
While Yudai is raping Kiyomi, Yoshie takes photos and blackmails Kiyomi into silence or else, she'd release the photos to the school. Mai is entranced by an unseen force and disappears. After recovering, Kiyomi encounters the woman in white, screams and then becomes sexually attached to Yudai, apparently possessed by the ghost. Haruka learns that Tetsuya mysteriously died, with his face frozen with fear. Tetsuya's mother, Michiko, reveals that she and her son are spiritually aware. Yoshie is told that Mai is at a nightclub, where Mai leads her away. Kiyomi convinces her teacher, Noguchi, to go to her house at night so he can have sex with Mina. She also blackmails Yudai into fatally bludgeoning Mina with a telephone or else, his rape would be reported. Kiyomi then frames Noguchi for the murder by pouring the contents of his used condom onto Mina's corpse. The following day, Michiko is haunted by Tetsuya's ghost.
3	"Episode 3"	Sho Miyake	Hiroshi Takahashi, Takashige Ichise	July 3, 2020
In 1994, Kiyomi and Yudai have changed their identities and are married with a five-year-old son, Toshiki. Yudai is physically abusive to Toshiki, attracting the attention of child protection agent Kimie Ariyasu. A year later, Odajima asks Haruka to reveal the whereabouts of the haunted house. Haruka collaborates and visits Michiko, who performs a séance to ask Tetsuya's ghost about the house. Although he gives the location, he warns the two women not to go into the house. The house itself has new occupants, a couple named Nobuhiko and Keiko Haida. Nobuhiko is cheating with Chie Masaki, a pregnant woman. Unbeknonwst to them, Chie's husband, Keiichi, has been spying on them for a while. Meanwhile, Yudai's domestic abuse hits its nadir when he hits Toshiki with a telephone, sending him into a persistent vegetative state, although Toshiki can astral project his spirit.
4	"Episode 4"	Sho Miyake	Hiroshi Takahashi, Takashige Ichise	July 3, 2020
Odajima, Haruka, and Kimie team up to solve the haunted house case. Odajima admits that he used to live in the house and was motivated to write a book about it after his family died not long after they moved there. A serial killer later tells Odajima about the house's history; it was first inhabited by a woman in 1952, who was held captive, raped and impregnated by a man. She was later killed, with her baby disappearing, and is implied to be the woman in white. Chie confesses to Keiichi that her baby was fathered by Nobuhiko and tries to kill him. Keiichi kills her and cuts open her womb to save the unborn baby's life. With it, he goes to the Haida residence, where Nobuhiko has committed suicide after killing Keiko. Convinced that the baby "belongs to the house", Keiichi buries the fetus in the backyard after it dies. An unknown woman invites him to have dinner before he returns home, finding that Chie's womb now contains a ringing telephone. Keiichi surrenders to the police but he sees the ghosts of Chie and her baby and is forced to eat the latter, killing him. Authorities arrive to apprehend Yudai but Toshiki's spirit tells him to run away.
5	"Episode 5"	Sho Miyake	Hiroshi Takahashi, Takashige Ichise	July 3, 2020
Odajima investigates the haunted house with a new ally, detective Kosaka, and sees that it's able to replay traumatic events from his and Kiyomi's past. Yudai visits Kiyomi, who has become a prostitute, to ask her for drugs. She tells him that Toshiki is not their biological son, but rather a baby she adopted from the cursed house after her rape. Kiyomi then drowns Yudai in the bathtub before breaking into the haunted house so she could relive her high school days. The ghosts of Yoshie and Mai apologize to Kiyomi before whisking her away. Kosaka learns that the 1952 case was committed in the house's attic by Hiroshi Sunada, the son of the first landlord, who was later killed by his victim. Odajima sees signs of Kiyomi's break-in and is reminded of his childhood, where his sister, Kazuha, meets the woman in white. She gives her baby, who is implied to be Toshiki, to Kazuha, which is then passed to Odajima. A time-traveling teenage Kiyomi, whom young Odajima sees as a shadow entity, breaks in and retrieves the baby.
6	"Episode 6"	Sho Miyake	Hiroshi Takahashi, Takashige Ichise	July 3, 2020
In 1997, the cursed house is sold to Yusaku and Tomoko Morozumi. The two initially refuse to heed Odajima's warning about the danger of the house, but later ask for his help after experiencing visions of the Haida murders, where it is revealed that Tomoko was the woman who invited Keiichi for dinner. Odajima and Haruka summon Michiko to conduct another séance, this time in the house's attic. Tomoko is hospitalized after being terrorized by a vision of Sunada, who attempts to kill the woman in white but she kills him self-defense. Michiko's séance ends with her meeting the woman in white, who hints to her that burying her and her baby would end the curse. The woman kills Michiko off-screen. Yusaku is forced to re-enact the death of Odajima's father, who combusted after standing outside the house. Odajima speculates to Kosaka that the telephone in Chie's womb was a tailsman to prevent "anything from coming out". Toshiki wakes up from his coma and tells Kimie to run away. Haruka tries to end the curse by burying the cassette tape that recorded her 1988 talk show interview whilst Michiko's ghost laughs from behind. Haruka hears a baby's cries but sees nothing. She leaves but is suddenly ambushed by Sunada's ghost.

== Reception ==
On the review aggregator website Rotten Tomatoes, 85% of 13 critic reviews were positive, with an average rating of 3/5, giving it the highest critic score of the franchise. Brian Tallerico of RogerEbert.com said: "The idea of brutal violence cursing a place or person now comes to Netflix in the form of a 6-episode prequel series called Ju-On: Origins, and it proves that there’s still some life in this concept."
