= Takako Fuji =

Japanese actress

- 藤 貴子
- Born: July 27, 1972 (age 54); Tokyo, Japan
- Occupations: Actress; voice actress
- Years active: 1994–present
- Height: 165 cm (5 ft 5 in)
- Spouse: Jō Watanabe (m. 1998; div. 2004)
- Children: 1

Takako Fuji (藤 貴子, Fuji Takako; born 27 July 1972) is a Japanese actress and voice actress from Tokyo, Japan. She is best known for her performances as Kayako Saeki in the Ju-On and Grudge franchises.

== Biography ==
A native of Tokyo, Fuji studied English literature at the Aoyama Gakuin University, and during her college years, she studied acting as a student in Theatrical Group EN and later became a contracted actress there. Her work was usually stage actress or in voice-over studios, but occasionally she would also appear in TV series or films. Her most famous role to this date is that of Kayako Saeki, the vengeful ghost in the Ju-on series, which she subsequently played in The Grudge series later on as well. She first played Kayako in 1997, in a short film titled Kattei Hōmon (家庭訪問, Home Visit), which was created as a project for film academy by Takashi Shimizu—one of the creators of the series and the director of most of its installments—and later served as the foundation for the entire franchise. She later reprised the role in Katasumi, another short film that aired in 1998 as part of the TV program Gakkô no kaidan G, and continued to play the character in the direct-to-video films Ju-on and its sequel, Ju-on 2.

When director Takashi Shimizu decided to direct two additional installments for a broader theatrical release, which he called Ju-on: The Grudge and Ju-on: The Grudge 2, Fuji played the character of Kayako twice more. When the films were subsequently remade for an American audience as The Grudge and The Grudge 2, she returned as Kayako again. However, she declined the role in The Grudge 3 which subsequently went to Aiko Horiuchi.

In 1998, she married Jō Watanabe, a fellow member of the Theatrical Group EN. They divorced in 2004.

== Filmography ==
=== Films ===
List of acting performances in feature films
Year	Title	Role	Notes	Refs
1997	Princess Mononoke	Woman in Iron Town		
2002	Ju-on: The Grudge	Kayako Saeki	Main Antagonist	
2003	Ju-on: The Grudge 2	Kayako Saeki	Main Antagonist	
2004	The Grudge	Kayako Saeki	Main Antagonist	
2005	Reincarnation	Hotel Maid		
2005	The Samurai I Loved			
2006	The Grudge 2	Kayako Saeki	Main Antagonist	
2006	The iDol	Rika		
2007	Ghost vs. Alien 03			
2007	The Cat's Whiskers			

List of acting performances in direct-to-video and television films
Year	Title	Role	Notes	Refs
1996	Death Duel on Dream Chaser Hill		TV movie	
1998	Katasumi	Kayako Saeki	short film	
2000	Ju-on: The Curse	Kayako Saeki	Direct to-DVD	
2000	Ju-on: The Curse 2	Kayako Saeki	Direct to-DVD	

=== Anime ===
List of voice performances in anime
Year	Title	Role	Notes	Refs
1998	Detective Conan	Tomoko Hayasaka / Toshimi Ebihara		
1998	Devil Lady	Satomi Yuasa	23 episodes	
1999	Crest of the Stars	Gyumuryua	13 episodes	
2000	Turn A Gundam	Little Girl in Canal C	Episode: "Sea Battle of the Lunar Surface"	
2010	Naruto: Shippuden	Hidden Stone Village Jonin	Episode: "Naruto and the Old Soldier"	
2015	Ghost in the Shell: Arise Architecture	Jeril / VV	4 Episodes	
2019	The Rising of the Shield Hero	Old Woman	Episode: "Curse Shield"	
2024	Rick and Morty: The Anime	Beth Smith		

=== Dubbing ===
List of voice performances in overseas dubbing
Title	Role	Notes	Refs
The Falcon and the Winter Soldier	Valentina Allegra de Fontaine	Voice dub for Julia Louis-Dreyfus	
Black Widow	Valentina Allegra de Fontaine	Voice dub for Julia Louis-Dreyfus	
Black Panther: Wakanda Forever	Valentina Allegra de Fontaine	Voice dub for Julia Louis-Dreyfus	
Thunderbolts*	Valentina Allegra de Fontaine	Voice dub for Julia Louis-Dreyfus	
2012	Laura Wilson	Voice dub for Thandie Newton	
Adventures of Jules Verne			
Æon Flux	Sithandra	Voice dub for Sophie Okonedo	
After Earth	Faia Raige	Voice dub for Sophie Okonedo	
Almost Human	Captain Sandra Maldonado	Voice dub for Lili Taylor	
Armageddon	Grace Stamper	Voice dub for Liv Tyler	
Black Lightning	Lynn Stewart	Voice dub for Christine Adams	
Brandy & Mr. Whiskers	Lola Boa	Voice dub for Alanna Ubach	
The Child in Time	Julie	Voice dub for Kelly Macdonald	
The Conjuring	Carolyn Perron	Voice dub for Lili Taylor	
Creep	Kate	Voice dub for Franka Potente	
CSI: Miami	Natalia Boa Vista	Voice dub for Eva LaRue	
Curse of Chucky	Barb Pierce	Voice dub for Danielle Bisutti	
Deliver Us from Evil	Jen Sarchie	Voice dub for Olivia Munn	
Due Date	Heidi	Voice dub for Juliette Lewis	
Dying Light 2 Stay Human	Lawan	Voice dub for Rosario Dawson	
Enough	Slim Hiller	Voice dub for Jennifer Lopez	
Good Bye, Lenin!	Ariane Kerner	Voice dub for Maria Simon	
The Grudge	Faith Matheson	Voice dub for Lin Shaye	
The Grudge	Fiona Landers	Voice dub for Tara Westwood	
Hearts in Atlantis	Liz Garfield	Voice dub for Hope Davis	
Hereditary	Annie Graham	Voice dub for Toni Collette	
Hide and Seek	Elizabeth Young	Voice dub for Elisabeth Shue	
High Incident	Jesse Erugado	Voice dub for Lisa Vidal	
The Hunger Games: Mockingjay – Part 2	Lieutenant Jackson	Voice dub for Michelle Forbes	
Johnny English	Lorna Campbell	Voice dub for Natalie Imbruglia	
The Kitchen	Ruby O'Carroll	Voice dub for Tiffany Haddish	
Last Scandal	Lee Na-yoon	Voice dub for Byun Jung-soo	
Liar	DI Vanessa Harmon	Voice dub for Shelley Conn	
Life Is Beautiful	Amico Rodolfo	Voice dub for Claudio Alfonsi	
Limitless	Melissa Gant	Voice dub for Anna Friel	
A Little Bit of Heaven	Marley Corbett	Voice dub for Kate Hudson	
The Lord of the Rings: The Rings of Power	Marigold Brandyfoot	Voice dub for Sara Zwangobani	
The Loudest Voice	Gretchen Carlson	Voice dub for Naomi Watts	
Marnie	Susan Clabon	Voice dub for Mariette Hartley	
The Mandalorian	The Armorer	Voice dub for Emily Swallow	
Maze Runner: The Scorch Trials	Mary Cooper	Voice dub for Lili Taylor	
Missing	Grace Allen	Voice dub for Nia Long	
Mission: Impossible III	Lindsey Farris	Voice dub for Keri Russell	
Monk	Natalie Teeger	Voice dub for Traylor Howard	
New Year's Eve	Laura	Voice dub for Katherine Heigl	
Nightmare Alley	Zeena Krumbein	Voice dub for Toni Collette	
Out of Time	Anne-Merai Harrison	Voice dub for Sanaa Lathan	
The Pacifier	Claire Fletcher	Voice dub for Lauren Graham	
Saw series	Amanda Young	Voice dub for Shawnee Smith	
Shades of Blue	Detective Tess Nazario	Voice dub for Drea de Matteo	
Strike Back	Maj. Rachel Dalton	Voice dub for Rhona Mitra	
Third Watch			
Titanic	Rose	Voice dub for Kate Winslet	
Tomorrowland	Ursula	Voice dub for Kathryn Hahn	
Treadstone	Ellen Becker	Voice dub for Michelle Forbes	
U.S. Marshals	Marie Bineaux	Voice dub for Irène Jacob	
Vincenzo	Choi Myung-hee	Voice dub for Kim Yeo-jin	
Westworld	Maeve Millay	Voice dub for Thandie Newton	
What to Expect When You're Expecting	Holly Castillo	Voice dub for Jennifer Lopez	
The World Is Not Enough	Dr. Christmas Jones	Voice dub for Denise Richards	
Yo soy Betty, la fea	Betty	Voice dub for Ana Maria Orozco	
Zombieland: Double Tap	Nevada	Voice dub for Rosario Dawson	
