= Ju-On: The Final Curse =

Ju-on: The Final Curse
- Poster
- 呪怨 -ザ・ファイナル-
- Directed by: Masayuki Ochiai
- Written by: Masayuki Ochiai; Takashige Ichise
- Produced by: Takashige Ichise
- Starring: Airi Taira; Renn Kiriyama; Nonoka Ono; Yurina Yanagi; Miyabi Matsuura; RIMI; Kanan Nakahara; Misaki Saisho; Kai Kobayashi; Yasuhito Hida; Yuina Kuroshima; Yoshihiko Hakamada; Nozomi Sasaki
- Production company: NBCUniversal Entertainment Japan
- Distributed by: Showgate
- Release date: June 20, 2015 (Japan)
- Running time: 90 Minutes
- Country: Japan
- Language: Japanese
- Box office: $5 million

Ju-On: The Final Curse (Japanese: 呪怨 -ザ・ファイナル-, Hepburn: Ju-on -Za Fainaru-) is a 2015 Japanese supernatural horror film and the eleventh installment of the Ju-on franchise. The film is a direct sequel to Ju-on: The Beginning of the End, set in that film's continuity and was marketed as the final film in the Ju-on franchise. The film was produced and co-written by Takashige Ichise and directed and co-written by Masayuki Ochiai. The film was released on June 20, 2015.

== Plot ==
Like previous films in the series, Ju-on: The Final Curse is told in an anachronistic order through eight vignettes titled after characters featured in the story. They are, in order: Mai (麻衣), Reo (玲央), Ena (絵菜), Madoka (まどか), Toshio (俊雄), Midori (碧), Sota (奏太), and Kayako (伽椰子). The synopsis presents a rough chronology of the film's plot.

Reo Hasegawa, a high school girl living with Maki, her single mother, gets to live with her maternal cousin, who has recently lost his parents. The boy is seemingly mute and acts strangely and after Reo's friends, Midori and Madoka, play with him, Reo tells them that he is none other than Toshio Saeki. Midori is then spooked by Toshio at a karaoke booth and also by the ghost of her sister Yayoi, who disappeared nine years ago. Yayoi's ghost kills Midori by shoving her head into the booth's ceiling. Madoka also finds out about the murder of Toshio's mother by her husband, who subsequently disappeared, and relays the information to Reo. Afterwards, Toshio's ghost fatally boils Madoka's body from the inside.

Reo sneaks into Toshio's room and finds him motionless. When she is grabbed by another Toshio, Reo freaks out and falls down the stairs. She and Maki board themselves from Kayako's ghost, but Reo tells Maki to leave the family since she brought in Toshio. Maki refuses and plans to kill Toshio to make up for her mistakes. However, Kayako slams Maki onto the floor and chokes her with her hair, killing her. Reo decides to kill Toshio herself but Kayako also kills her by snapping her back.

Meanwhile, Mai Shono, a hotel staff member, is concerned about her younger sister, Yui, who disappeared mysteriously. Mai sees visions of Yui telling her about Toshio and also receives a voice mail containing Kayako's death rattle. Receiving Yui's belongings, Mai finds a book containing Toshio's address but learns that the Saeki house has been demolished and barred from being built again by Kyosuke Takeda, who believes that the curse would die if the house was gone. Mai asks Kyosuke for Reo's address but finds her house empty. Mai's boyfriend, the train station guard Sota Kitamura, questions Ena, a psychic girl living near Reo's house, as she has been recording Toshio's activities. Sota has a vision of Ena wanting to play with Toshio in the afterlife, which disturbs him. Sota then goes to Reo's house and is choked by Toshio but he fatally chokes him back. Nonetheless, Sota is disturbed by his murder and believes the curse wouldn't die either way. Kayako enters his house and suffocates him to death.

Mai arrives at Reo's house and sees the ghosts of Reo and her mother, who have become supportive of Toshio's actions and laugh at Mai for being cursed. They show her Mai but call her "Toshio". Toshio leaves her body, implying that Toshio Yamaga was the sole culprit of the hauntings and that he had previously used Toshio Saeki's body as a vessel since birth before being killed by Sota, forcing him to enter Ena's body. Mai frantically tries to escape but is cornered by Kayako. Kayako manifests as Yui, who bemoans her suffering and states that the curse will never end. Suddenly, she laughs and shows her mutilated mouth to Mai, who whispers "help me" whilst Toshio Yamaga watches from behind, leaving her fate unknown.

== Cast ==
- Airi Taira as Mai Shono (生野麻衣, Shōno Mai)
- Renn Kiriyama as Sota Kitamura (北村奏太, Kitamura Sōta)
- Nonoka Ono as Reo Hasegawa (長谷川玲央, Hasegawa Reo)
- Yurina Yanagi as Midori (碧)
- Miyabi Matsuura as Madoka (まどか)
- RIMI as Ena (絵菜)
- Kanan Nakahara as Maki Hasegawa (長谷川真紀, Hasegawa Maki)
- Yuina Kuroshima as Yayoi (弥生)
- Misaki Saisho as Kayako Saeki
- Kai Kobayashi as Toshio Saeki
- Yasuhito Hida as Takeo Saeki
- Yoshihiko Hakamada as Kyosuke Takeda (竹田京介, Takeda Kyōsuke)
- Nozomi Sasaki as Yui Shono (生野結衣, Shōno Yui)
- Hikakin as Waiter (ファミレス店員, Famiresu Ten'in)
