= The Grudge =

2004 film by Takashi Shimizu

- Theatrical release poster
- Directed by: Takashi Shimizu
- Screenplay by: Stephen Susco
- Based on: Ju-On: The Grudge by Takashi Shimizu
- Produced by: Sam Raimi; Robert Tapert; Takashige Ichise
- Starring: Sarah Michelle Gellar; Jason Behr; KaDee Strickland; Clea DuVall; Bill Pullman
- Cinematography: Hideo Yamamoto
- Edited by: Jeff Betancourt
- Music by: Christopher Young
- Production company: Ghost House Pictures
- Distributed by: Columbia Pictures (United States and Canada; through Sony Pictures Releasing); Senator International (International)
- Release date: October 22, 2004
- Running time: 91 minutes
- Countries: United States; Japan
- Languages: English; Japanese
- Budget: $10 million
- Box office: $187.3 million

The Grudge is a 2004 supernatural horror film directed by Takashi Shimizu, written by Stephen Susco, and produced by Sam Raimi, Robert Tapert, and Takashige Ichise. A remake of Shimizu's own 2002 Japanese horror film Ju-On: The Grudge, it is the first installment in The Grudge film series. It stars Sarah Michelle Gellar, Jason Behr, KaDee Strickland, Clea DuVall, and Bill Pullman. Takako Fuji, Yuya Ozeki, and Takashi Matsuyama portray the characters Kayako Saeki, Toshio Saeki, and Takeo Saeki from the original films. The plot is told through a nonlinear sequence of events and includes several intersecting subplots. It's an international co-production film between the United States and Japan.

The Grudge was released in North America by Sony Pictures Releasing through its Columbia Pictures label on October 22, 2004, and grossed $187.3 million worldwide, and received mixed reviews from critics. It was followed by two sequels, The Grudge 2, released theatrically in October 2006, The Grudge 3, released direct-to-video in May 2009, and a sidequel, The Grudge, released theatrically in December 2019.

== Plot ==
The Grudge is a curse, born when someone dies in extreme rage or sorrow and lingers where the person dies. Those who encounter it will die, and the curse is reborn repeatedly, passing from victim to victim in an endless growing chain of horror.

In 2001, Kayako Saeki, a housewife in Tokyo, is in love with her college professor, Peter Kirk, obsessively writing about him in a diary. Her jealous husband Takeo discovers the diary and believes Kayako is having an affair. In a fit of rage, he brutally murders her, their young son Toshio, and their pet cat Mar. After Takeo hides the bodies in the house, Kayako's ghost hangs him with her hair. After receiving a letter from Kayako, Peter visits the Saeki house only to find her and Takeo's corpses and Toshio's ghost. Shocked and horrified, he flees the scene and commits suicide the next day. The remainder of the Saeki family rises again as restless ghosts due to the curse, notably Kayako, who appears as an onryō.

In 2004, the Williams family from America moved into the Saeki house for Matt's job. While Matt is thrilled with the house, his wife Jennifer and dementia-ridden mother Emma feel uncomfortable, the former experiencing culture shock and feeling lost as she can't speak Japanese, and the latter sensing that something is wrong with the house. The curse quickly consumes Matt and Jennifer. Matt's sister Susan is also haunted as the curse follows her back into her apartment. Yoko, a care worker, arrives at the house to find Emma alone before she encounters Kayako, who drags her up into the attic. Concerned about Yoko's disappearance, her employer, Alex, sends another care worker, Karen Davis, to take over the care of Emma. Karen discovers Toshio sealed up in a wardrobe at the house and later witnesses Kayako's spirit descending from the ceilings to claim Emma.

Alex arrives at the house and finds Emma dead and Karen in shock. He calls the police, who come with Detective Nakagawa. In the attic, Nakagawa and his partner Igarashi find Matt and Jennifer's bodies, along with a human's lower jaw. Meanwhile, Susan is pursued by Kayako around her office building. At home, Kayako attacks her, and she vanishes. While leaving work, Alex is killed by Yoko's jawless corpse. Kayako begins haunting Karen, who informs her boyfriend, Doug, of the situation.

Karen researches the house, eventually confronting Nakagawa, who explains that the curse consumed three of his colleagues investigating the Saeki deaths. That night, Nakagawa carries gasoline into the house to burn it down but is killed by Takeo. Karen races there after learning Doug has ventured to the Saeki house to look for her. She finds Doug paralyzed and attempts to flee with him. Kayako crawls down the stairs and latches onto Doug, who dies of shock. As Kayako closes in, Karen sees the gasoline and ignites it. Karen survives, and in the hospital, she learns that the house also survived the fire. Visiting Doug's body, Karen realizes that Kayako still haunts her.

== Cast ==
- Sarah Michelle Gellar as Karen Davis, an exchange student
- Jason Behr as Doug, Karen's boyfriend
- William Mapother as Matthew Williams, who relocates to Tokyo for a promotion
- Clea DuVall as Jennifer Williams, Matt's wife
- KaDee Strickland as Susan Williams, Matt's younger sister and a businesswoman
- Grace Zabriskie as Emma Williams, Matt and Susan's mother
- Bill Pullman as Peter Kirk, a college professor working in Tokyo
- Rosa Blasi as Maria Kirk, Peter's wife
- Ted Raimi as Alex, the director of the care center where Yoko and Karen are stationed
- Ryo Ishibashi as Nakagawa, a detective who previously investigated the Saeki murders
- Yōko Maki as Yoko, a Japanese care worker
- Yoshiyuki Morishita as a guard
- Takako Fuji as Kayako Saeki, Takeo's wife who is in love with Peter Kirk
- Yuya Ozeki as Toshio Saeki, Kayako and Takeo Saeki's son
- Takashi Matsuyama as Takeo Saeki, Kayako's husband and Toshio's father

== Production ==
Takashi Shimizu, the director and creator of the original film, was hired to direct The Grudge, from a screenplay by Stephen Susco. Sam Raimi produced through his Ghost House Pictures banner, alongside Robert Tapert and Takashige Ichise. Principal photography on the film began on January 26, 2004, with reshoots occurring in July 2004 in Tokyo, Japan. Sarah Michelle Gellar filmed her scenes in Tokyo within three months before returning for the reshoots.

== Release ==
=== Theatrical ===
The Grudge was theatrically released in the United States by Columbia Pictures on October 22, 2004, and opened at 3,348 theaters.

=== Home media ===
The Grudge was released by Sony Pictures Home Entertainment on VHS, DVD, and UMD on February 1, 2005. The film was released on Blu-ray Disc in the US on May 12, 2009. The film made $9.24 million from DVD sales in its first week, debuting at #2 in the sales chart behind Ray.

== Reception ==
=== Box office ===
The film generated $39.1 million in ticket sales in its first weekend (October 22–24), exceeding the expectations of box-office analysts and Sony Pictures executives. Ticket sales declined 43% on the second weekend, earning $21.8 million. It grossed $110.4 million in the United States and Canada, with $76.9 million in other territories, for a worldwide total of $187.3 million.

=== Critical response ===
On the review aggregator website Rotten Tomatoes, 41% of 162 critics' reviews are positive, with an average rating of 5.1/10. The website's consensus reads: "There's some creepy imagery to be found, but not much in the way of logic or truly jarring scares." Metacritic, which uses a weighted average, assigned the film a score of 49 out of 100, based on 32 critics, indicating "mixed or average" reviews.

Roger Ebert of Chicago Sun-Times gave the film one star out of four, writing "I'm not sure how most of the scenes fit into the movie. I do, however, understand the underlying premise: There is a haunted house, and everybody who enters it will have unspeakable things happen to them." He criticized the fragmented time structure and said he "eventually lost all patience". Brian Rentschler of Screen Rant gave an overall positive review but in the end, unfavorably compared the film to The Ring, writing: "Writer/director Takashi Shimizu (who also wrote and directed the original) does a decent job of setting the mood of the film and (to a lesser extent) developing the storyline, but to be so similar to a movie that came out only two years ago... it's a tough obstacle to overcome."

Kevin Thomas of the Los Angeles Times wrote, "A convoluted plot makes it hard for the viewer to track the action and to become involved with any of the characters, including Gellar's perfectly nice, perfectly ordinary student. This makes it all the harder to go along with all the haunted house horrors that ensnare her". He ended his review with, "The Grudge is a fairly faithful adaptation of Shimizu's Ju-On, which in turn was based on his direct-to-video version, which in turn also spawned a direct-to-video sequel. More than anything, The Grudge suggests that it's time for Shimizu to move on". Scott Foundas from Variety wrote, "Project might have been more successful if Shimizu had style and/or atmosphere to substitute for his canned scares, cardboard compositions and flaccid cutting".

== Legacy ==
A big part of why the film was greenlit by Sony was due to the success of The Ring (2002), which paved the way for American remakes of several other Asian and Japanese horror films. This film, also being a huge financial success and audience favorite, kickstarted the J-horror and Asian horror remake trend of the 2000’s, the following remakes including Dark Water (2005), Pulse (2006), One Missed Call, Shutter, The Eye, Mirrors, The Echo (all in 2008), The Uninvited and Don't Look Up (both 2009), Apartment 1303 3D (2012), and 13 Sins (2014).

After its release, The Grudge has been favorably viewed as one of the more successful and well-done J-horror remakes to come out of the trend, in part due to the original director Shimizu returning to helm this remake of his own film. This film is also credited for inspiring the change in landscape for Asian horror remakes and supernatural horror films of its decade.

== Sequels ==
A sequel, The Grudge 2, also directed by Takashi Shimizu and set after the events of The Grudge, was released on October 13, 2006, with Takako Fuji and Sarah Michelle Gellar reprising their roles as Kayako Saeki and Karen Davis respectively, the latter in a cameo appearance, and Ohga Tanaka as Toshio Saeki.

Another sequel, The Grudge 3, directed by Toby Wilkins and set immediately after the events of The Grudge 2, was released on May 12, 2009, starring Aiko Horiuchi as Kayako and Shimba Tsuchiya as Toshio.

A sidequel, The Grudge, directed by Nicolas Pesce and set during and after the events of the first three Grudge films, was released on December 31, 2019, featuring the characters of Kayako and Toshio in cameo appearances.
