= Shingo Katsurayama =

Japanese actor

- 葛山 信吾
- Born: April 7, 1972 (age 53); Kameyama, Mie, Japan
- Occupation: Actor
- Years active: 1990 - present
- Agent: CES
- Height: 1.76 m (5 ft 9 in)
- Spouse: Naomi Hosokawa (m. 2002)
- Website: Official profile

Shingo Katsurayama (葛山 信吾, Katsurayama Shingo; born April 7, 1972, in Kameyama, Mie, Japan) is a Japanese actor who is represented by the talent agency CES. He is known as Kaoru Ichijo in Kamen Rider Kuuga and Keisuke Okuni in Ju-On: The Grudge 2.

Katsurayama's hobbies include recreational driving, collecting mini-cars, karaoke, outdoor sports, as well as playing the saxophone.

== Filmography ==
=== TV series ===
Year	Title	Role	Network	Notes
1991	Vingt Cinq Ans Kekkon		Fuji TV	
1992	Hōkago	Yu Sakaura	Fuji TV	
1993	Ai Shi Teru yo!	Hiroshi Matsuoka	TV Asahi	
1993	The Strawberry Statement	Naoya Shimazaki	TV Asahi	
1994	Yukemuri Joshidai-sei Sōdō		ABC	
1994	17-sai: At Seventeen		Fuji TV	
1994	Dai Kazoku Drama Yome no Derumaku	Koji Nakagawa	TV Asahi	
1994	Watashi no Unmei	Makoto Nakagawa	TBS	
1996	Yume-reki Nagasaki Bugyō	Tōyama Kagemoto	NHK	
1997	Sashisuse-so!?	Yuji	TBS	
1998	Uesugi Harunori		NHK	
1998	Kamisama, Mōsukoshi Dake		Fuji TV	
1999	Genroku Ryōran	Okano Kinemon	NHK	Taiga drama
1999	Maiko-san wa Mei Tantei!	Sugihara	TV Asahi	
1999	Wataru Seken wa Oni Bakari	Nobuhiko Kasuga	TBS	
2000	Kamen Rider Kuuga	Kaoru Ichijo	TV Asahi	
2000	Alibi no Kanata ni	Keiji Koyama	Fuji TV	
2001	Kasōken no Onna	Junji Uehara	TV Asahi	
2002	Toshiie to Matsu: Kaga Hyakumangoku Monogatari	Azai Nagamasa	NHK	Taiga drama
2002	Koisuru Top Lady		KTV	Episode 4
2002	Shinju Fujin	Naoya Sugino	THK	
2003	Itsumo Futari de	Naoyuki Okuda	Fuji TV	
2003	Bijo ka Nokemono	Kimiyasu Hongo	Fuji TV	Episode 2
2003	Aka-chan o Sagase		NHK	
2003	Ōoku	Tokugawa Iemochi	Fuji TV	
2003	Anata no Jinsei o Hakobi Shimasu	Kurebayashi	TBS	Episode 5
2003	Yumemiru Budō: Hon o Yomu Onna	Hiromi Furuya	NHK	
2003	The Eldest Boy and His Three Elder Sisters	Yuji Kitamura	TBS	
2004	Ryoma ga Yuku	Takasugi Shinsaku	TV Tokyo	
2004	Fire Boys: Me-gumi no Daigo	Mitsuru Akahoshi	Fuji TV	
2004	Chiharu Saotome no Tenjō Hōkoku-sho	Tetsuya Kisaragi	TBS	
2004	Horobi no Monochrome	Kengo Inami	Fuji TV	
2004	Kekkon no Katachi	Daisuke Nakahara	NHK	
2005	Rikon Bengoshi	Kosuke Kitayama	Fuji TV	Episode 3
2005	Kisou no Onna II	Tsutomu Ebihara	TV Asahi	
2005	Densha Otoko	Seno	Fuji TV	Episode 4
2006	Top Caster	Keigo Hattori	Fuji TV	Episode 4
2006	Boku no Aruku Michi	Masaya Kawahara	KTV	
2006	Himitsuna Oku-san	Rokuro Aida	Fuji TV	
2007	Mop Girl	Itto Kitahama	TV Asahi	Episode 9
2007	Sushi Ōji!	Shinkuro Sekigetsu	TV Asahi	Episodes 3 and 4
2008	Suite 10: Saigo no Koibito	Yasunori Seki	TBS	
2008	7-ri no Onna Bengoshi	Yosuke Nakagawa	TV Asahi	Final Episode
2009	Tenchijin	Abe Masayoshi	NHK	Taiga drama
2009	Rescue: Tokubetsu Kōdo Kyūjotai	Hiroyuki Umifuji	TBS	Episode 8 and Final Episode
2009	Yukemuri Bus Tour Sayaka Sakuraba no Jiken-bo	Taro Tondabayashi	TBS	
2010	Angel Bank	Yukihiro Ishii	TV Asahi	Episode 7
2010	Okā-san no Saigo no Tsuitachi	Shoichi Mizuno	TV Asahi	
2010	Marks no Yama	Saburo Arisawa	WOWOW	
2010	Tantei Club	Shinichi Narita	Fuji TV	
2011	Marumo no Okite	Junichiro Sasakura	Fuji TV	Episode 1
2011	Hanawa-ka no Shi Shimai	Onodera	TBS	Episodes 6 and 7
2012	Toshi Densetsu no Onna	Ryoichi Narita	TV Asahi	Final Episode
2012	Usuzakura-ki	Keinoshin Takagi	NHK BS Premium	
2012	Yasuo Uchida Suspense	Kazuo Okabe	TV Tokyo	
2012	Perfect Blue	Toshihiko Uno	TBS	Episode 4
2013	Kateikyōshi ga Hodoku!	Junya Matsuo	TBS	
2013	Doubles: Futari no Deka	Eisaku Kawashima	TV Asahi	Episode 6
2013	Mitsuhiko Asami Series 33 Shinkirō	Masashi Takatsu	TBS	
2013	The Genie Family	Yuriko Papa	Fuji TV	
2014	Hotel G-Men Gushiken Yōko no Satsujin Suiri 2	Kazuhiko Murakami	TV Tokyo	
2014	Last Doctor: Kansatsu-i Akita no Kenshi Hōkoku	Yoshiyuki Murai	TV Tokyo	Episode 4
2014	Misa Yamamura Suspense Akai Reikyūsha 34	Shusuke Takano	Fuji TV	
2014	Sutekina-sen Taxi	Akira Naito	KTV	Episode 7
2015	San-biki no Ossan 2: Seigi no Mikata, Futatabi!!	Tatsumi Saeki	TV Tokyo	Episode 4
2015	Shugoshin Bodyguard Teru Shindo 4	Kenichiro Dozono	TBS	
2015	Watashi wa Daikō-ya! Jiken Suiri Ukeoinin 4	Seiji Anzai	ABC	
2015	Taxi Driver's Mystery Diary 38	Toshihiko Shindo	TV Asahi	
2015	Detective versus Detectives	Shoji Kodama	Fuji TV	
2015	Angel Heart	Hideyuki Makimura	NTV	Episode 2–6
2021	Bullets, Bones and Blocked Noses	Kasumi Hōjō's father	NHK	Miniseries

=== Films ===
Year	Title	Role	Notes
1994	Yokohama Bakkure-tai	Tsunematsu Narita	
2000	Zawazawa Shimokitazawa		
2001	Godzilla, Mothra and King Ghidorah: Giant Monsters All-Out Attack	Kobayakawa	
2003	Ju-On: The Grudge 2	Keisuke Okuni	
2006	Gigolo Wannabe	Shintaro	
2006	The Inugamis	Suketake Inugami	
2008	Dreaming Awake		
2010	Hanjiro	Kojiro Ayukawa	
2010	AIBOU: The Movie II	Eigo Isomura	
2011	Koitanibashi		
2021	Nobutora	Yamagata Masakage	
