= Ju-On =

Japanese horror franchise created by Takashi Shimizu

- Franchise logo
- Created by: Takashi Shimizu
- Original work: Katasumi and 4444444444 (1998)

Print publications
- Novels: Ju-On (2003); Ju-On 2 (2003); Ju-On: Black Ghost (2009); Ju-On: White Ghost (2009); Ju-On: The Beginning of the End (2014); Ju-On: The Final Curse (2015)
- Comics: Ju-On: Video Side; Ju-On: Vol. 2; The Grudge
- Graphic novel: The Grudge 1.5

Films and television
- Films: Ju-On: The Curse (2000); Ju-On: The Curse 2 (2000); Ju-On: The Grudge (2002); Ju-On: The Grudge 2 (2003); The Grudge (2004); The Grudge 2 (2006); The Grudge 3 (2009); Ju-On: Black Ghost (2009); Ju-On: White Ghost (2009); Ju-On: The Beginning of the End (2014); Ju-On: The Final Curse (2015); Sadako vs. Kayako (2016); The Grudge (2020)
- Short films: Katasumi and 4444444444 (1998); Tales from the Grudge (2006)
- Television series: Ju-On: Origins (2020)

Games
- Video game: Ju-On: The Grudge (2009)

Audio
- Soundtracks: Ju-On: The Grudge; Ju-On: The Grudge 2; The Grudge; The Grudge 2; The Grudge

Miscellaneous
- Pachinko: CR Ju-On

Ju-On (呪怨, Juon; lit. 'Curse Grudge', also known as The Grudge) is a Japanese horror franchise created by Takashi Shimizu. The franchise began in 1998 with the release of the short films Katasumi and 4444444444. Shimizu attended the Film School of Tokyo, where he studied under Kiyoshi Kurosawa. Kurosawa helped Shimizu shepherd the Ju-On projects to fruition.

The Ju-On films generally revolve around a curse created in a house in Nerima, Tokyo, when Takeo Saeki, convinced that his wife, Kayako, is having an affair with another man, murders her, their son, Toshio, and Toshio's pet cat in a jealous fit of rage. According to Ju-On, when a person dies with a deep and powerful rage, a curse is born. The curse gathers in the place where that person has died or which they frequented, and repeats itself there. The spirits of the deceased haunt the location, potentially killing anyone who encounters the curse by any means, such as entering a cursed house or being in contact with somebody who was already cursed after entering it. The curse's manifestation is mainly death, where the victims' bodies may or may not disappear. The following deaths may create more curses and spread them to other locations.

The franchise consists of thirteen films, including four American-produced films and one streaming television series, alongside various additional media and merchandise products.

== History ==
Ju-On Original series in light green Remake series in blue Reboot in yellow Crossover in orange
1998	Katasumi and 4444444444
1999
2000	Ju-On: The Curse
2000	Ju-On: The Curse 2
2001
2002	Ju-On: The Grudge
2003	Ju-On: The Grudge 2
2004	The Grudge
2005
2006	The Grudge 2
2007–2008
2009	The Grudge 3
2009	Ju-On: Black Ghost/Ju-On: White Ghost
2010–2013
2014	Ju-On: The Beginning of the End
2015	Ju-On: The Final Curse
2016	Sadako vs. Kayako
2017–2019
2020	The Grudge

Shimizu stated in an interview that the inspiration for Ju-On came from his own personal fears as a child, and from a Japanese butoh dance group that would paint their nude bodies white and perform. Shimizu found the performance frightening and decided to "paint [his] ghosts white". He also mentioned that the rise in the number of domestic abuse cases emerging in Japan during production of his previous films gave him ideas about the origins of the story.

The title of the Japanese films translates roughly to "Curse of Grudge", or more abstractly, a curse created due to an individual bearing a grudge against someone or something. The first two films in the series were so-called V-Cinema, or direct-to-video releases, but became surprise hits as the result of favorable word of mouth. Both films were shot in nine days and feature a story that is a variation on the classic haunted house theme, as well as a popular Japanese horror trope, the "vengeful ghost" (onryō). The titular curse, ju-on, is one which takes on a life of its own and seeks new victims. Anyone who encounters a ghost killed by the curse is killed themselves and the curse is able to be spread to other areas.

Under very tight budgetary constraints, Shimizu's films garnered much acclaim from both critics and genre fans for their effective use of limited locations and eerie atmosphere to generate chills. Shimizu was at the same time perfectly willing to show his ghosts onscreen, in contrast to some directors who might choose only to hint at their appearance. Critics noted that Shimizu's minimalist approach to directing and storytelling—a necessary by-product of the production's limited overall resources—allows the films to retain their ability to unnerve viewers. Very few scenes in the movies are graphically bloody, making such scenes more disturbing when they occur.

Following the success of the two direct-to-video films, and the international success of Hideo Nakata's Ring (1998), Kurosawa and Ring screenwriter Hiroshi Takahashi helped Shimizu develop a theatrical Ju-On sequel starring Megumi Okina and Takako Fuji. The film, titled Ju-On: The Grudge, was released on October 18, 2002, to critical acclaim, and was followed by a sequel, Ju-On: The Grudge 2, that was released on August 23, 2003.

The rights to an American film remake of The Grudge were eventually acquired, with Shimizu himself attached to direct and Sarah Michelle Gellar starring. The film was released in 2004 to mixed reviews. The film's box office success would lead it to spawn its own series of American-produced films, including 2006's The Grudge 2 and 2009's The Grudge 3. Both films follow a unique storyline, albeit The Grudge 2 still drawing inspiration from several Japanese films.

In celebration of the tenth anniversary of the franchise, two new sequels, Ju-On: White Ghost and Ju-On: Black Ghost were screen simultaneously in Japanese theaters in 2009. The stories of two films deviate from that of the cursed Saeki family, focusing on two unrelated, but also, ill-fated families.

For the fifteenth anniversary of the Ju-On franchise, a reboot was released in 2014, titled Ju-On: The Beginning of the End. Drawing inspiration from The Grudge 2, The Beginning of the End features a new backstory regarding the curse, while still featuring the Saeki family as an integral part of the plot. The film was followed by a 2015 sequel, Ju-On: The Final Curse, which was promoted as the final film in the series. Both films had no significant input from series creator Shimizu.

A crossover with the Ring franchise, Sadako vs. Kayako, was released on June 18, 2016.

Another installment of the American film series was released on December 31, 2019, to generally negative reviews.

Grudge director, Nicolas Pesce, expressed interest in a crossover between the American Grudge and Ring film series, just as was done with 2016's Sadako vs. Kayako. Prior to his film's release, Pesce expressed further interest in a sequel being set in both a different part of the world than America or Japan, and in a different "less contemporary" time period compared to previous films.

A TV series adaptation, titled Ju-On: Origins, was released exclusively on Netflix worldwide on July 3, 2020.

== Japanese films ==
=== Original series ===
- Katasumi and 4444444444 (1998; short films shown within television film Gakkō no kaidan G)
- V-Cinema - Direct-to-Video
  - Ju-On: The Curse (2000)
  - Ju-On: The Curse 2 (2000)
- Theatrical films
  - Ju-On: The Grudge (2002)
  - Ju-On: The Grudge 2 (2003)
  - Ju-On: Black Ghost/Ju-On: White Ghost (2009) (10th Anniversary Films)

=== Reboot series ===
- Ju-On: The Beginning of the End (2014)
- Ju-On: The Final Curse (2015)

=== Crossover ===
- Sadako vs. Kayako (2016; crossover with The Ring series)

== American films ==
- The Grudge (2004)
- The Grudge 2 (2006)
  - Tales from the Grudge - Three short films (Hotel, School, House) that were released as part of marketing for the film.
- The Grudge 3 (2009)
- The Grudge (2019)

== TV series ==
Ju-On: Origins is a streaming television series. It premiered on Netflix on July 3, 2020, with a total of 6 episodes.

== Theater ==
A stage play adaptation of Ju-On was developed in 2023. It adapts the plots from Ju-On: The Curse and its sequel.

== Literature ==
Several Ju-On print publications were published by Kadokawa in Japan, and Dark Horse Comics in North America between 2003 and 2015. Every single Ju-On film has received a novel adaptation, except for The Grudge 3.

=== Novels ===
In 2003, novelizations of stories from the series were written by Kei Ohishi. The first novel, Ju-on, elaborates on events and characters from Ju-On: The Curse, The Curse 2 and Ju-On: The Grudge. A novel titled Ju-On 2 was released the same year, which elaborates on the events from Ju-On: The Grudge 2. Novelizations of Ju-On: White Ghost and Black Ghost were published in 2009. Ju-On 2, White Ghost and Black Ghost did not receive English translations. In 2014, a novelization of The Beginning of the End was released and a novelization of The Final Curse was released in 2015.

Official Japanese-language novelizations of the American films were also written by Kei Ohishi, the first being a novelization of The Grudge (released in Japan as The Juon), which was published in 2005 and generally follows the premise of the film faithfully. A novelization of its sequel, The Grudge 2 (released in Japan as Ju-On: Pandemic), was published later on in 2007. The novels were all published by Kadokawa Shoten and only the 2003 novel received an English translation.

== Video game ==
In honor of the series' 10th anniversary, a game, titled Ju-On: The Grudge – Haunted House Simulator was developed for the Wii. The game was released in Japan in 2009 by AQ Interactive under the title Kyoufu Taikan: Ju-On (Fear Experience: Ju-On), and in Europe under the title Ju-On: A Fright Simulator. Upon release, the game was critically panned.

Xseed Games described it as a "haunted house simulator", rather than a traditional survival horror game. The game does not feature any combat, as its format relies on subtle exploration and scare tactics. Joystiq reviewers who were present for the demo's screening at the E3 justified this, observing that "in most horror games, a skilled player can actually defeat the creatures (with notable exceptions like Silent Hill 2's Pyramid Head ...), making the game more of a power fantasy than a true fright. In both of these games [Silent Hill 2 and Ju-On: The Grudge], you can escape the creatures at best".

== Reception ==
=== Box office performance ===
==== Japanese films ====
Film	Release date	Box office gross		
Film	Release date	Japan	United States and Canada	Other territories
Ju-on: The Grudge	18 October 2002	¥500,000,000	$325,680	$9,306,043 (Note: Ju-on (2002) overseas box office: South Korea – 1,016,928 admissions in 2003 – ₩7,118,496,000 ($5,973,847); Other territories – $3,332,196)
Ju-on: The Grudge 2	23 August 2003	¥1,100,000,000	$511,350	$4,375,425 (Note: Ju-on 2 (2002) overseas box office: South Korea – 440,000 admissions in 2003 – ₩3.08 billion ($2,584,738); Other territories – $1,790,687)
Ju-On: The Beginning of the End	28 June 2014	¥570,000,000	—N/a	$4,082,954
Ju-On: The Final Curse	20 June 2015	¥419,000,000	—N/a	$1,724,642 (Note: The Final Curse (2002) overseas box office: South Korea – ₩462,659,400 ($409,014); Other territories – $1,315,628)
Sadako vs. Kayako	18 June 2016	¥1,000,000,000	—N/a	$884,250 (Note: Sadako vs. Kayako (2016) overseas box office: South Korea – ₩202,716,000 ($151,249); Other territories – $704,922)
Regional total		¥3,170,000,000 ($38,475,815)	$837,031	$20,373,314
Worldwide total		$59,686,275		

==== American films ====
Film	Release date	Box office gross			Budget	Reference
Film	Release date	North America	Other territories	Worldwide	Budget	Reference
The Grudge (2004)	October 22, 2004	$110,359,362	$76,921,753	$187,281,115	$10 million	
The Grudge 2	October 13, 2006	$39,143,839	$31,567,336	$70,711,175	$20 million	
The Grudge 3	May 12, 2009	—N/a	$1,869,127	$1,869,127	$5 million	
The Grudge (2020)	January 3, 2020	$21,221,803	$28,289,516	$49,511,319	$10 million	
Total		$170,725,004	$138,647,732	$309,372,736	$45 million	

=== Critical and audience reception ===
Film	Rotten Tomatoes	Metacritic	CinemaScore	PostTrak
Ju-On: The Curse	64% (14 reviews)	—N/a	—N/a	—N/a
Ju-On: The Grudge	80% (5 reviews)	48 (22 reviews)	—N/a	—N/a
Ju-On: The Grudge 2	56% (71 reviews)	—N/a	—N/a	—N/a
The Grudge (2004)	40% (162 reviews)	49 (32 reviews)	—N/a	—N/a
The Grudge 2	12% (77 reviews)	33 (16 reviews)	—N/a	—N/a
The Grudge (2020)	20% (129 reviews)	41 (28 reviews)	F	0.5
Ju-On: Origins	85% (13 reviews)	58 (5 reviews)	—N/a	—N/a

== Unofficial films ==
Sadako Wars: Bixian vs Kayako is an unofficial Chinese crossover film. Released in 2017 as a part of the Bunshinsaba film series, the film features characters from Bunshinsaba as well as Kayako. A follow up, Bunshinsaba: Hoichi the Earless, features Kayako as well as from Sadako from The Ring.
