= Sylvanian Families the Movie: A Gift from Freya =

2023 Japanese film by Kazuya Konaka

- Directed by: Kazuya Konaka
- Written by: Hiroshi Kobayashi
- Based on: Sylvanian Families
- Produced by: Michihiro Maeda; Kenshi Seki
- Starring: Yuina Kuroshima; Inori Minase; Satoshi Hino; Akeno Watanabe; Kaede Hondo; Misa Watanabe; Mayu Matsuoka; Nonoka Murakata; DAIGO; Yū Aoi
- Narrated by: Misa Watanabe
- Music by: Atsushi Ichikawa
- Production companies: Frebari; Epoch
- Distributed by: Aeon Entertainment
- Release date: 23 November 2023
- Running time: 66 minutes
- Country: Japan
- Language: Japanese

Sylvanian Families the Movie: A Gift from Freya (劇場版 シルバニアファミリー フレアからのおくりもの, Gekijōban Shirubania Famirī Furea kara no Okurimono), simply known as Sylvanian Families: The Movie, is a 2023 Japanese animated film directed by Kazuya Konaka. It is based on the Sylvanian Families toyline and its 2017 CGI-animated miniseries.

Japanese pop rock duo Puffy AmiYumi collaborated with Tamio Okuda to create the film's theme song, SweetSweet. Both worked on the lyrics, while Tamio Okudo was the composer and Puffy AmiYumi performed the vocals.

== Plot ==
In the peaceful village of Sylvania, Freya finds a red leaf and is excited that autumn is starting. After helping her mom, Teri, with cleaning and her dad, Frasier, with making strawberry bread, she finds out that her mother has been invited to play her saxophone at the upcoming annual Star Festival. Freya's brother, Coco, reminds her that the Star Festival lands on the same day as their mother's birthday. Coco plans to carve a figure of their mother as a gift, and Freya understands that the strawberry bread her father is making is a gift as well. After learning that her little sister, Crème, has a secret gift planned, Freya grows worried as she is the only family member who has not yet come up with a gift for her mother.

With prompting from Crème, Freya decides to ask her friends for advice. She asks her squirrel friend, Ralph Walnut, and he decides to ask his own mom what she would like if she could have anything in the world as a gift. She says she would like a beautiful new hat to wear to the Star Festival, which gives Freya the idea to get a hat for her own mother. She sees a beautiful hat at the fashion store, but it has been reserved, so Ralph and Freya work together to make a hat out of straw and flowers instead. After it is completed, however, a strong autumn wind blows it away and the two children begin chasing after it. Along the way, they fall on the Husky Family's picnic blanket, which ends up getting blown away as well. Freya and Ralph are carried through the air with the picnic blanket acting as a parachute, and Ralph manages to catch the flyaway hat.

Freya loses her grip on the blanket and falls, but she and Ralph are rescued by a sailor named Bruce, who is a relative of the Husky Family and returned from his travels to attend the Star Festival. Freya decides to let Ralph have the hat so he can give it to his mother, since he risked his life to help get the hat back and she was the one who said she wanted a hat. With this, Freya still needs to find a gift for her mother.

This time, Freya asks her Persian cat friend Lyra for help. After listening to her mom explain the different types of saxophones, Freya comes up with the idea to make a trumpet with multiple tubes so it can make a wide variety of sounds. Lyra helps Freya build it, but they figure out it is impossible to play the longer tubes because they require too much breath. Lyra attaches an air bellow to the mouthpiece as a solution, but when they test out the biggest part of the trumpet, it creates a sound so loud that the ground shakes. Several mirrors and windows crack throughout Sylvania; Freya and Lyra apologize alongside their families to the rest of the town.

Freya is still feeling downtrodden the next day, during which it is raining. She laments the weather with Lyra and Lyra's sister Skye, until they see Bruce enjoying the rain. He reminds them that rain is something to be appreciated, and Freya wants to try making a new xylophone-like instrument for her mother that can be played in the rain. The three girls work together to create the instrument and bring it to the market for a test run, where it creates beautiful sounds thanks to the rain. She offers it as a gift to the whole village to make up for the destruction she caused the previous day, thus still needing a gift for her mother.

Not long before the day of the Star Festival, Freya is assigned to be the judge for the Tree of the Year competition. After visiting some of the trees nominated by the villagers, Freya cannot decide which is the best and goes up to the hill to think, where she can see all of Sylvania. Bruce finds her and reveals that he was a judge for Tree of the Year many years ago, and the tree he selected is on that very hill. He chose the tree for the same reason that Freya came to the hill in the first place, as it overlooks a view of the entire village, allowing the beauty of Sylvania to be truly appreciated. Bruce tells Freya that the key to choosing a tree is to identify exactly what the village means to her.

Back at home when the whole family is together, the subject of Tree of the Year makes Teri think about the tree she planted with Frasier many years ago. The two of them tell the story to their family. They discovered an ancient castle next to a waterfall, and behind the waterfall was a cave that had a hole in the ceiling where sunlight could shine through. There were plants growing where the light shined, and after visiting the cave many times, the two of them decided to plant a small tree sapling in the middle. Right afterwards, Frasier proposed to Teri, but they ended up losing the path to the old castle and had not seen their tree in many years.

On the night of the Star Festival, the mayor declares it is time to announce which tree Freya has chosen for Tree of the Year. Freya guides the villagers through a pathway lit by candles, which she and her friends had been working on all day. She leads everyone to the ancient castle her parents had seen all those years ago, and explains that she saw it on the day she and Ralph were flying over the forest with the picnic blanket. Everyone enters the cave, and Teri and Frasier are delighted to see how much the tree has grown. Freya explains that the reason she chose it for Tree of the Year is because it is where her parents proposed, and so is the place her family began. The villagers congratulate Freya's decision, but Freya laments not being able to find a birthday gift for her mother. Her mother tells her that finding the tree was already the perfect gift. Teri plays her saxophone for the festival, and Crème sings along to the music, revealing that her present is the lyrics she made up.

After the festival, Bruce Husky is ready to leave Sylvania and set sail on his boat to explore new horizons once more. Freya meets him on the hill and he tells her that even though he has been to many places, he feels that Sylvania is the best in the world, because it is the only place that has children as wonderful as Freya.

== Cast ==
=== Chocolate Rabbit family ===
- Yuina Kuroshima as Freya Chocolate
- Yū Aoi as Teri Chocolate
- Satoshi Hino as Frasier Chocolate
- Akeno Watanabe as Coco Chocolate
- Mayu Matsuoka as Stella Chocolate
- Nonoka Murakata as Crème Chocolate

=== Walnut family ===
- Kaede Hondo as Ralph Walnut
- Ryōko Nagata as Yardley Walnut
- Nozomi Kogi as Ambrose Walnut

=== Husky family ===
- DAIGO as Bruce Husky
- Tomokazu Sugita as Vincent Husky
- Misa Kato as Avril Husky
- Haruka Shiraishi as Hayden Husky
- Chinatsu Akasaki as Pauline Husky

=== Persian family ===
- Inori Minase as Lyra Persian
- Yuuka Yama as Skye Persian
- Hiroki Shimowada as Lucas Persian
- Sachiko Kojima as Dawn Persian

== Release ==
Charades acquired the sales for the film in October 2023. The film was released in Japan on 23 November of the same year and later on DVD on 8 November 2024.

An English dub of the film was released in theaters in the UK and Ireland on April 4, 2025. The theatrical and home entertainment releases were distributed by Dazzler Media. The dub was also released theatrically in Australia on May 8. The theatrical run and DVD release were distributed by Madman Entertainment.
