= Takashi Matsuyama (actor) =

Japanese actor and voice actor

- Occupations: Actor, voice actor
- Agent: Aoni Production

Takashi Matsuyama (松山 鷹志, Matsuyama Takashi) is a Japanese actor and voice actor. He played Takeo Saeki in The Grudge, Morimichi Sugita in Kamen Rider Kuuga and Mamoru Satake in Zipang.

== Filmography ==
=== Anime series ===
- Arcade Gamer Fubuki as Referee
- Arknights: Prelude to Dawn as Ace
- Assassination Classroom as Lovro Brovski
- Ancient Girl's Frame as Alex Robinson
- Bakugan Battle Brawlers: New Vestroia as Helios
- Bakutsuri Bar Hunter as Hoojirō Samejima
- Battle Programmer Shirase as Principal Miura (ep 15)
- Beast Wars II as Megastorm/Gigastorm, Powerhug
- Beyblade as Gideon
- Black Blood Brothers as Mitaki Onezaki
- Black Bullet as Shigetoku Tadashima
- Bomberman Jetters as Daibon
- Boruto as Master Kajiki
- Beast Wars Neo as Rockbuster
- Bermuda Triangle: Colorful Pastrale as Manta
- Corrector Yui as Warwolf/Synchro
- Cyberpunk: Edgerunners 2 as Sal Bigelow
- Death Note as Jack Neylon/Kal Snydar
- Detroit Metal City as The Capitalist Pig/Keisuke Nashimoto
- Di Gi Charat Nyo! as Kintarou Kumagaya
- Di Gi Charat Summer Special as Paya Paya
- Digimon Adventure 02 as Mushamon
- Digimon Tamers as Allomon (5), Mushamon (10)
- Digimon Frontier as Snimon
- Digimon Adventure (2020 TV series) as Algomon, Gaossmon, Abbadomon
- Drifting Dragons as Badakin
- Fairy Tail as Jose Porla, Byro (Edolas), Byro Cracy, Atlas Flame, Geoffrey, Arlock and Yajeel
- Fantastic Children as Radcliff (ep 1)
- Freezing Vibration as Marks Spencer
- Full Moon Wo Sagashite as Jim Franklin
- Ghost Hunt as Matsuyama
- Ginga Densetsu Weed as Akame; Narrator
- Hatena Illusion (TV) as Jeeves Wodehouse
- Heroic Age as Mobeedo Oz Mehelim
- Houshin Engi as Bunchuu
- Hozuki's Coolheadedness as Rurio
- Hungry Heart: Wild Striker as Kazuo Murakami
- Hunter × Hunter (1999) as Geretta, Gotoh, Nobunaga Hazama
- Hunter × Hunter (OVA) as Nobunaga Hazama
- Hunter × Hunter (2011) as Johness The Dissector
- Jigoku Shōjo Futakomori as Kihachi Kusumi (ep 13)
- Jubei-chan - Secret of the Lovely Eyepatch as Daigo Ryujoji/Taiko Daiyu
- Katekyo Hitman Reborn! as Yamamoto's father
- Kinnikuman: Perfect Origin Arc as Polarman
- Kodocha as Mr. Hayama; Nakao's father
- Kyo Kara Maoh! as Dakaskos
- Lance N' Masques as Gai Kongouji
- Leave it to Piyoko! as Bug
- Legendz: Yomigaeru Ryuuou Densetsu as President
- Les Misérables: Shōjo Cosette as Javert
- Let This Grieving Soul Retire! as Noctus
- Mao as Byōki
- Migi & Dali as Osamu Sonoyama
- Monsuno as Petro
- Mōretsu Pirates as Oyaji-san
- Mouse as Audio Transmission 1 (Ep 2); One (Ep 9-12)
- Multi-Mind Mayhem as Sanai Oka
- Mushishi as Father (ep 7)
- Muteking the Dancing Hero as Tommy
- Nanaka 6/17 as Taizou Kirisato
- Natsume's Book of Friends as One-Eyed Middle Class Yokai, Umpire Youkai
- Nobunaga Concerto as Hachisuka Masakatsu
- Ojarumaru as Oshino Itsute
- One Piece as Du Feld, Kuni, Daikoku
- Ore, Tsushima as Osamu
- Panyo Panyo Di Gi Charat as Director
- Papillon Rose as Master
- Peacemaker Kurogane as Hajime Saitou
- Ragna Crimson as King Femud
- Real Drive as Mamoru Aoi
- Rizelmine as Papa C
- Sadamitsu the Destroyer as Detective
- Samurai Deeper Kyo as Saizou Kiragakure
- Sh15uya as Igaya
- Shiawase Sou no Okojo-san as Kitsune-sensei
- Shura no Toki as Miyamoto Musashi
- Silent Möbius as Carua Se; Shiobara
- Slayers REVOLUTION as Duclis
- Sol Bianca: The Legacy as Auctioneer (Ep 1)
- Suzuka as Yoshio Akitsuki
- Tales of Hearts as Labrado Arcome
- The Demon Girl Next Door Season 2 as Shirosawa
- The Price of Smiles (TV) as Gale Owens
- The Prince of Tennis as Nanijiroh Echizen
- The Prince of Tennis: A Day on Survival Mountain as Nanijiroh Echizen
- Tonkatsu DJ Agetarō as Gorō Mizokuro
- Toriko as Pen (ep 85)
- Transformers: Robots in Disguise as Ultra Magnus
- Tsukuyomi -Moon Phase- as Kinkeru
- Ultimate Girls as Yosaku Okamura
- Uzumaki as Shuichi's Father
- Violinist of Hamelin as Beast King Guitar
- You're Under Arrest as Instructor (ep 4)
- You're Under Arrest as Instructor; Lancia Man
- Yu-Gi-Oh! Duel Monsters as Maze Sibling (Older)
- Yu-Gi-Oh! Duel Monsters GX as Gergo
- Yu-Gi-Oh! 5D's as Mizoguchi
- Yumeiro Patissiere as Kazuhiko Kirishima (ep 22)
- Zoids Genesis as Ra-Kan
- Zipang as Mamoru Satake

==== Anime films ====
- Escaflowne: The Movie as Nukushi
- Ghost in the Shell (movie) as Criminal
- Beast Wars II The Movie (special) as Gigastorm
- Natsume's Book of Friends The Movie: Ephemeral Bond (movie) as One-Eyed Middle Class Yokai
- Natsume's Book of Friends: The Waking Rock and the Strange Visitor (movie) as One-Eyed Middle Class Yokai

=== Live action films ===
- The Grudge as Takeo Saeki
- The Grudge 2 as Takeo Saeki
- Ju-on: The Grudge as Takeo Saeki
- Heisei Ultraseven as Togo
- StrayDog as Man in White

=== Video games ===
- Dragon Ball Legends as Kahseral (replacing Unshō Ishizuka)
- Street Fighter III: 3rd Strike as Oro
- Street Fighter V as Necalli and Oro
- Warriors Orochi 4 as Zeus
- Super Robot Wars Y as Novie/Novey Dickens

=== Tokusatsu ===
- Kamen Rider Kuuga as Morimichi Sugita
- Kaitou Sentai Lupinranger VS Keisatsu Sentai Patranger as Jarnake Saucer (ep 38)

=== Dubbing ===
==== Live-action ====
- Aquaman as King Ricou of the Fishermen (voice-over for Djimon Hounsou)
- The Brothers Bloom as Stephen (voice-over for Mark Ruffalo)
- The Crow: Wicked Prayer as El Niño (voice-over for Dennis Hopper)
- Hulk as Harper (voice-over for Kevin Rankin)
- Man of Steel as Steve Lombard (voice-over for Michael Kelly)
- A Mighty Heart as Mir Zubair Mahmood, East Karachi Deputy Inspector General (voice-over for Irrfan Khan)
- Mr. Bean's Holiday as Mr. Bean (voice-over for Rowan Atkinson)
- Speed Racer as Sparky (voice-over for Kick Gurry)
- Super 8 as Louis Dainard (voice-over for Ron Eldard)
- Swordfish as Axl's lawyer (voice-over for Kirk B.R. Woller)
- The Twilight Zone as Captain Lane Pendleton (voice-over for Greg Kinnear)
- Welcome Home Roscoe Jenkins as Reggie Jenkins (voice-over for Mike Epps)

==== Animation ====
- The Powerpuff Girls as Fuzzy Lumpkins
