= Ju-On: The Beginning of the End =

Ju-on: The Beginning of the End
- Film poster
- Directed by: Masayuki Ochiai
- Written by: Masayuki Ochiai; Takashige Ichise
- Produced by: Takashige Ichise
- Starring: Nozomi Sasaki; Sho Aoyagi; Reina Triendl; Miho Kanazawa; Haori Takahashi; Yuina Kuroshima; Misaki Saisho; Kai Kobayashi; Yasuhito Hida; Yoshihiko Hakamada
- Cinematography: Hirofumi Okada
- Edited by: Yoshifumi Fukazawa
- Music by: Kôji Ueno
- Production companies: Altemate; Fujishoji; Gambit; NBCUniversal Entertainment Japan; Showgate; W Field
- Distributed by: Showgate
- Release date: 28 June 2014
- Running time: 91 minutes
- Country: Japan
- Language: Japanese
- Box office: $8.9 million

Ju-on: The Beginning of the End (Japanese: 呪怨: 終わりの始まり, Hepburn: Ju-on: Owari no Hajimari) is a 2014 Japanese supernatural horror film and the tenth installment of the Ju-on franchise. The film was directed and co-written by Masayuki Ochiai with Takashige Ichise producing and co-writing. The Beginning of the End is a reboot of the series, retelling the events of the cursed Saeki family that centers on a house in Nerima, Japan.

== Plot ==
Continuing the trademark of the series, Beginning of the End is divided into eight segments presented in an anachronistic order, each titled after a character central to that segment. They are, in the following order: Yui (結衣), Nanami (七海), Kayako (伽椰子), Yayoi (弥生), Rina (莉奈), Aoi (葵), Naoto (直人), and Toshio (俊雄). The synopsis presents a rough chronology of the film's plot.

In 1995 Tokyo, after a report of possible child abuse happening in the Yamaga household, authorities and the schoolteacher of the family's son, Toshio, search the household and find Toshio's bleeding corpse in the bedroom closet. Toshio's ghost kills the schoolteacher.

Nine years later, a group of high school students: Nanami, Yayoi, Aoi, and Rina, visit the former Yamaga house, now sold to Aoi's older sister. Nanami is spooked by Toshio's ghost whilst her friends find drawings that depict them dying in several ways. The friends then suffer the same deaths they've seen in the drawings; Yayoi is dragged away by Toshio whilst lying in bed. Rina is scalded with hot water before Toshio drags her away in a refrigerator. Aoi is forced to tear off her mandible after she sees her reflection do the same in the mirror. Some time later, Nanami sees her friends' ghosts on a train before finding herself in the Yamaga house, where she is dragged away and killed. Aoi's sister sells the house to a couple named Takeo and Kayako Saeki.

Ten years later, an elementary schoolteacher, Yui Shono, is assigned to replace Mr. Konishi as a homeroom teacher. She is concerned when she finds that a student, Toshio Saeki, has been absent for a week and decides to visit the Saeki household. She meets Toshio's mother, Kayako, who acts strangely, and discovers a bedroom closet that has been sealed up with tape. Disturbed, Yui seeks Mr. Konishi's help but learns that he recently died. Yui's mental health also declines as she has hallucinations of Toshio and Kayako. She finds Kayako's diary and with the help of her boyfriend, Naoto Miyakoshi, they learn that Kayako could not get pregnant and thus, conspired to have a baby via supernatural means and trick Takeo into believing he was the father. Naoto seeks further information from Kyosuke Takeda, who is traumatized after the curse claimed the lives of his wife and her sister, who is revealed to be Aoi. Naoto then discovers that Toshio Yamaga and Toshio Saeki are the same before an unseen entity fatally snaps his neck clockwise. As he dies, Naoto sees Toshio's face.

Having recovered from her disturbed state, Yui visits the Saeki household and opens the closet, discovering a box of tapes that show the Saeki family's lives from 2004. One tape shows that Kayako got pregnant after the spirit of Toshio Yamaga entered her body, implying that Toshio Saeki was a reincarnation of Toshio Yamaga. Yui also finds out that Kayako was dead all along after seeing a flashback of Takeo fatally snapping her neck clockwise after she taunted him about her deception. Then, Takeo microwaves Toshio's cat before presumably stabbing Toshio.

Yui finds Kayako's body in the closet, which crawls towards her and is cornered by both Kayako and Toshio. Suddenly, she wakes up back at her own apartment and is approached by Naoto's corpse, which has come alive and is seemingly possessed by Kayako. Yui tearfully accepts her fate whilst Toshio watches from behind.

== Cast ==
- Nozomi Sasaki as Yui Shono (生野結衣, Shōno Yui)
- Sho Aoyagi as Naoto Miyakoshi (宮越直人, Miyakoshi Naoto)
- Reina Triendl as Nanami (七海)
- Miho Kanazawa as Rina (莉奈)
- Haori Takahashi as Aoi (葵)
- Yuina Kuroshima as Yayoi (弥生)
- Maki Ishikawa as Vice-Principal Inui (乾教頭, Inui-kyōtō)
- Yuka Eta as Miwa Takeda (竹田美和, Takeda Miwa)
- Masako Ikeda as Shuko Terada (寺田修子, Terada Shūko)
- Misaki Saisho as Kayako Saeki
- Kai Kobayashi as Toshio Saeki/Toshio Yamaga (山賀俊雄, Yamaga Toshio)
- Yasuhito Hida as Takeo Saeki
- Yoshihiko Hakamada as Kyosuke Takeda (竹田京介, Takeda Kyōsuke)

== Production ==
The film was first announced at a press conference held at Akagi Shrine in Tokyo in February 2014, following a spirit cleansing ceremony at the shrine. Filming began soon thereafter on March 4. Beginning of the End was released on June 28 in Japan. The film was screened in the West as part of Fantasia Festival at the same time.

== Reception ==
The film has grossed ¥226 million (US$1.90 million) at the Japanese box office.

== Sequel ==
A sequel, Ju-On: The Final Curse, was promoted as the final installment in the Ju-on franchise. The film is again helmed by Masayuki Ochiai and stars Airi Taira as Mai Shono, the older sister of The Beginning of the End protagonist, Yui, who disappeared while visiting her pupil, Toshio Saeki. Kai Kobayashi and Misaki Saisho additionally return as Toshio and Kayako Saeki, respectively. The Final Curse was released on June 20, 2015.
