= Yuina Kuroshima =

Japanese model and actress

- 黒島 結菜
- Born: March 15, 1997 (age 29); Okinawa Prefecture, Japan
- Occupations: Actress; model
- Years active: 2013–present
- Partner: Hio Miyazawa
- Children: 1

Yuina Kuroshima (黒島 結菜, Kuroshima Yuina; born March 15, 1997) is a Japanese actress, model, and TV personality.

== Personal life ==
On January 16, 2024, Kuroshima and her long-time boyfriend, actor Hio Miyazawa, announced through their official social media accounts that they were expecting their first child together later that year. On July 12, the couple announced the birth of their first child.

== Filmography ==
=== Film ===
- Ju-on: The Beginning of the End (2014), Yayoi
- Strobe Edge (2015), Mao Sugimoto
- Ju-on: The Final (2015), Yayoi
- Ashita ni Nareba. (2015), Miki Sasaki
- Strayer's Chronicle (2015), Aoi
- At Home (2015), Asuka Moriyama
- Nagareboshi ga Kienai Uchini (2015), Eri Motoyama
- Oke Rojin (2016), Kazune Nonomura
- Sagrada Reset: Part 1 (2017), Misora Haruki
- Sagrada Reset: Part 2 (2017), Misora Haruki
- Principal (2018), Shima Sumitomo
- Talking the Pictures (2019), Umeko Kurihara
- 12 Suicidal Teens (2019), Meiko
- The End of the Pale Hour (2022), herself
- Fullmetal Alchemist: The Revenge of Scar (2022), Lan Fan
- Fullmetal Alchemist: The Final Alchemy (2022), Lan Fan
- Sylvanian Families the Movie: A Gift from Freya (2023), Freya (voice)
- The Parades (2024), Maiko
- A Conviction of Marriage (2024), Shinju Shinagawa
- A Light in the Harbor (2025), Aya Asakawa
- Strawberry Moon (2025)
- Cry Out (2026), Maiko Shinomiya
- 4 Outs: Back to the Ballgame (2026), Asuka Takahashi

=== Television ===
- Dinner Episode 9 ([2013)
- Blue Blazes (2014), Hiromi Tsuda
- Mago no Namae: Ōgai Papa no Meimei Sōdō 7-kakan (2014)
- Gomen ne Seishun! (2014), Takako Nakai
- Massan (2014–2015), Hideko Nakamura
- Kiseki no Dōbutsuen: Asahiyama Dōbutsuen Monogatari 2015 Inochi no Baton (2015), Akiko Natsuki
- Burning Flower (2015), Takasugi Masa
- Ichiban Densha ga Hashitta (2015), Toyoko Amada
- Samurai Sensei (2015), Sachiko Akagi
- The Girl Who Leapt Through Time ([2016), Mihane Yoshiyama
- Natsume Sōseki no Tsuma (2016)
- Chimudondon (2022)
- One Night, She Thinks of the Dawn (2022), herself
- The Black Swindler (2022)
- The Laughing Salesman (2025)

=== Commercials ===
- Benesse – Shinken Zemi Kōkō Kouza (2013)
- NTT DoCoMo (2013–)
- Point - Lowrys Farm (2014–)
- Mizuho Bank: Aeonbank ATM Renkei-hen (2014–)
- Kuraray - Mirabakesso (2014–)
- Calpis - Calpis Water (2015)

== Awards ==
Year	Award	Category	Work(s)	Result	Ref.
2020	43rd Japan Academy Film Prize	Newcomer of the Year	Talking the Pictures	Won	
2023	26th Nikkan Sports Drama Grand Prix	Best Supporting Actress	The Black Swindler	Won	
