= Megumi Okina =

Japanese actress and singer (born 1979)

- Born: 6 August 1979 (age 47); Hiroshima, Japan
- Occupations: Actress; Singer
- Years active: 1993–present
- Spouse: Ryo Kimura (m. 2016)

Megumi Okina (奥菜 恵, Okina Megumi; born 6 August 1979) is a Japanese actress and singer. Born in Hiroshima and raised in Tokyo, she made her J-Pop debut on 19 August 1995. She starred in the Japanese original of The Grudge. She married Susumu Fujita in January 2004. They divorced on 22 July 2005. In 2007, Megumi said she was retiring from the entertainment business. However, she reversed course by acting in a remake of the 2004 Thai film, Shutter. It was released March 21, 2008. She portrayed a ghost called Megumi Tanaka.

== Personal life ==
On March 12, 2009, she announced that she was four months pregnant and planning on marrying her boyfriend of two years, a businessman. However, they divorced on September 12, 2015. On March 12, 2016, she announced that she was married to Ryo Kimura.

== Discography ==
=== Albums ===
- 1995/09/21 : Blossom
- 1996/05/21 : illusion
- 1997/03/20 : gradation
- 1998/04/01 : i・n・g
- 1998/09/01 : Stairs -The Best Songs-

=== Singles ===
- 1995/08/19 : この悲しみを乗り越えて
- 1996/04/23 : そんなの悲しいね
- 1996/09/21 : あなたのそばで
- 1997/02/25 : 今でも...あなたが好きだから
- 1997/05/28 : 淑女の夢は万華鏡 (ending theme from Kochira Katsushika-ku Kameari Kōen-mae Hashutsujo)
- 1997/10/29 : それでも愛してる
- 1998/02/25 : ゆらゆら
- 1998/08/21 : Eternity

== Filmography ==
=== Films ===
- 1995: Night Head
- 2000: Tales of the Unusual
- 2000: Seven's Face
- 2001: Otogirisō (St John's Wort)
- 2001: Red Shadow: Akakage
- 2002: Ju-on: The Grudge
- 2006: Ulysses
- 2006: The Inugamis
- 2008: Shutter (aka Spirits)
- 2009: Crime or Punishment ?!?
- 2017: Cosmetic Wars
- 2020: Howling Village
- 2023: Kyrie
- 2025: Re: Kisaragi Station
- 2026: Captured!, Masami Sato

=== Dramas ===
- Fireworks, Should We See It from the Side or the Bottom? (Fuji TV, 1993)
- Kinjirareta Asobi (NTV, 1995)
- Wakaba no Koro (TBS, 1996)
- Kimi ga Jinsei no Toki (TBS, 1997)
- Futari (TV Asahi, 1997)
- Shinryonaikai Ryoko (NTV, 1997)
- Ao no Jidai (TBS, 1998)
- Hashire Komuin (Fuji TV, 1998)
- Genroku Ryoran (NHK, 1999)
- Tengoku ni Ichiban Chikai Otoko as Tsuyuzaki Koharu (TBS, 1999)
- Tengoku no Kiss as Mitarai Asumi (TV Asahi, 1999)
- Suna no ue no Koibitotachi (Fuji TV, 1999)
- Hanamura Daisuke (Fuji TV, 2000, ep11-12)
- Wakaresaseya as Mizusawa Chiharu (YTV, 2001)
- Shin Hoshi no Kinka (NTV, 2001)
- Koisuru Top Lady as Hasegawa Mizuki (Fuji TV, 2002)
- Boku ga Chikyu wo Suku as Tsukishima Kyoko (TBS, 2002)
- Beginner (Fuji TV, 2003)
- Kyohansha (NTV, 2003)
- Konya Hitori no Bed de as Jumonji Azusa (TBS, 2005)
- Jikou Keisatsu (TV Asahi, 2006, ep5)
- Oishii Koroshikata (BS Fuji, 2006)
- Wakatoryo to Kyuunin no Ko (NHK, 2006)
- Aibou 5 (TV Asahi, 2006, ep1)
- Takusan no Ai wo Arigato (たくさんの愛をありがとう) (NTV, 2006)
