= Ju-On: The Grudge 2 =

- Theatrical release poster

Japanese name
- Kanji: 呪怨2
- Kana: じゅおん2
Transcriptions
- Revised Hepburn: Juon 2
- Directed by: Takashi Shimizu
- Written by: Takashi Shimizu
- Produced by: Shin'ya Egawa; Takashige Ichise; Kunio Kawakami; Yoshinori Kumazawa; Haruhiko Matsushita; Hiroki Numata
- Starring: Noriko Sakai; Chiharu Niiyama; Kei Horie; Yui Ichikawa; Shingo Katsurayama; Ayumu Saito; Emi Yamamoto; Erika Kuroishi; Kaoru Mizuki; Shinobu Yuki; Yuya Ozeki; Takako Fuji
- Cinematography: Tokusho Kikumura
- Edited by: Nobuyuki Takahashi
- Music by: Shiro Sato
- Production companies: Toei Video; CELL
- Distributed by: T-Joy
- Release date: August 23, 2003
- Running time: 95 minutes
- Country: Japan
- Language: Japanese
- Box office: ¥1.1 billion (Japan) $2.7 million (overseas)

Ju-On: The Grudge 2 is a 2003 Japanese horror film and a sequel to Ju-On: The Grudge. The film was written and directed by Takashi Shimizu. It was released in Japan on August 23, 2003.

The series follows a curse created by a murdered housewife in a house in Nerima. The curse falls on anyone who enters the house where the murders took place. Everyone connected to the house since has met a terrible fate. In the film, Keisuke, the director of a popular TV horror show, casts scream queen, Kyoko Harase, as a special guest to an episode set in the Nerima house. The curse begins to set on everyone involved in the filming, including Kyoko herself. Like all films in the series, the plot is told in a non-linear order, with parts frequently overlapping each other.

== Plot ==
Like the rest of the Ju-On series, the film takes place over a period of time and is told in a non-linear order as six overlapping vignettes. The overarching plot involves the haunted house of the deceased Saeki family, whose brutal murders caused by Kayako Saeki's crush on another man led to the creation of a vengeful curse. Anyone who enters the house will eventually be consumed by the ghosts of the Saeki family. The vignettes are presented in the following order: Kyoko (京子), Tomoka (朋香), Megumi (恵), Keisuke (圭介), Chiharu (千春), and Kayako (伽椰子). The plot below is told chronologically.

Pregnant film actress Kyoko Harase joins the film crew to record an episode of the paranormal show at the Saeki house in Nerima, Tokyo. The crew includes director Keisuke Okuni, ambitious host Tomoka Miura, and hair stylist Megumi Obayashi. The filming goes well aside from some technical glitches caused by Kayako. At their office, Keisuke falls asleep and fails to notice supernatural phenomena in the footage. Kyoko and her fiancé Masashi Ishikura drive home, but their car crashes when the ghost of Toshio Saeki appears. Masashi falls into a coma and Kyoko has a miscarriage. Kyoko encounters Toshio in the hospital, who touches her stomach before disappearing, and she tells her mother that he must have been the spirit of her lost child.

Two days later, Megumi suddenly finds herself assuming Kayako's role on the day she was murdered and is murdered by Kayako's bloody spirit. Meanwhile, Tomoka hears disturbing noises in her apartment before and after filming, namely something banging against the wall every night at 12:27 am. Her boyfriend, Noritaka Yamashita, goes to Tomoka's apartment on the night after filming. When Tomoka arrives home, she finds he has been hanged by a curtain of black hair and is being pushed against the wall by Toshio, creating a banging noise. Kayako hangs Tomoka too, who dies exactly at 12:27 am. The rest of the filming crew are also revealed to be killed by Kayako off-screen the following day.

Three months later, Kyoko is shocked when a doctor announces she is three months pregnant. That night, whilst Kyoko's mother sleeps, Kyoko sees Toshio and after he vanishes, she realizes that her mother has been dead the whole time. Eventually, Masashi comes out of his coma, mute and using a wheelchair, and seems to react badly to Kyoko's new pregnancy.

Keisuke drives Kyoko home but they spot Megumi disappearing into the latter's house. Inside, Keisuke encounters Megumi's ghost, who offers him Kayako's diary. Keisuke suspects Kyoko surviving the car crash was deliberate. Kyoko and Keisuke are haunted by Kayako and Megumi's ghosts until Kyoko returns to the Saeki house. There, she encounters a teenage girl, Chiharu, who survived the events of the Ju-on: The Grudge, being unable to exit the front door whilst Kayako ambushes her. Kyoko enters labor. Chiharu is revealed to have hallucinations about being trapped in a time loop, where she constantly phases in and of scenarios such as being trapped in the Saeki house or being cast as an extra in Kyoko's show. At one point, she finds herself dying in her friend's arms at a park before her usual time loop resumes. Chiharu later returns to reality, where she is murdered at the front door whilst her friend and Keisuke watch.

Keisuke enters the Saeki house but only finds an unconscious Kyoko. She is rushed to the hospital and gives birth, only for pandemonium to occur – Masashi is implied to throw himself off the roof, Toshio appears during the delivery, and the delivery team are killed by an unseen entity that exits Kyoko's body. Keisuke enters the delivery room and is killed by Kayako, who is revealed as the entity. Kyoko awakens and finds her newborn baby waiting for her, which she embraces.

A few years later, Kyoko and her daughter, who is implied to be a reincarnation of Kayako, walk across a bridge in Nerima. Kyoko's daughter fatally pushes her off the bridge and walks away with Kayako's diary.

== Cast ==
- Noriko Sakai as Kyoko Harase (原瀬 京子, Harase Kyōko)
- Shingo Katsurayama as Keisuke Okuni (大国 圭介, Ōkuni Keisuke)
- Chiharu Niiyama as Tomoka Miura (三浦 朋香, Miura Tomoka)
- Emi Yamamoto as Megumi Obayashi (大林 恵, Ōbayashi Megumi)
- Kei Horie as Noritaka Yamashita (山下 典孝, Yamashita Noritaka)
- Yui Ichikawa as Chiharu (千春)
- Ayumu Saito as Masashi Ishikura (石倉 将志, Ishikura Masashi)
- Erika Kuroishi as Hiromi (宏美)
- Kaoru Mizuki as Aki Harase (原瀬 亜紀, Harase Aki)
- Shinobu Yuki as Kaoru Ishikura (石倉 薫, Ishikura Kaoru)
- Takako Fuji as Kayako Saeki
- Yuya Ozeki as Toshio Saeki

== Home media ==
The film was released on DVD on January 18, 2005.

The PAL version is a two-disc affair, featuring many extras, such as trailers, premiere footage, the making of, behind-the-scenes footage, interviews, deleted/extended scenes, an audio commentary, and a DVD-ROM game (a flash version of this game is also available).
