= List of The Grudge characters =

The Grudge film series features a large cast of characters mainly created by screenwriter Stephen Susco and Takashi Shimizu. The film series focuses on people affected by a deadly curse that spreads like a virus and manifests itself in various ways, such as turning people homicidal or people being haunted, ultimately leading to their demise if they come in contact with the curse in any way.

All films in the series feature different protagonists, with the first being Karen Davis played by Sarah Michelle Gellar. The protagonist of the second installment and Karen's younger sister Aubrey was played by Amber Tamblyn, while the protagonist of The Grudge 3, Lisa, was portrayed by Johanna Braddy.

== The ghosts ==
The Ghosts are the only characters that appeared in all three of The Grudge films.

=== Kayako Saeki ===
Kayako Saeki (portrayed by Takako Fuji and Aiko Horiuchi) is the primary antagonist of The Grudge series. In life, she was an ordinary housewife and mother. When she was a child, her mother performed unorthodox exorcisms and passed her clients' curses to Kayako instead of herself. Kayako and her son Toshio were later killed in a fit of rage by her husband Takeo after he found her journal and discovered that she had feelings for an American man named Peter. Becoming an Onryō after her death, she now haunts the house, along with her husband, son, and her son's pet cat, Mar. In place of a voice, she usually makes a throaty, rattling noise.

=== Toshio Saeki ===
Toshio Saeki (portrayed by Yuya Ozeki, Ohga Tanaka and Shimba Tsuchiya) was the son of Kayako and Takeo. After he witnessed the death of his mother at the hands of his father, Takeo drowned Toshio in the bathtub, before killing his pet cat. Toshio's cursed spirit was left to inhabit the house, along with the spirits of his parents and cat. He makes a meowing noise instead of speaking.

=== Takeo Saeki ===
Takeo Saeki (portrayed by Takashi Matsuyama) is the husband of Kayako and the father of Toshio. Takeo finds Kayako's personal diary entries, several of which detail her love obsession with Peter Kirk. As a result, he murders her and Toshio in a fit of jealousy, but Kayako’s spirit retaliates by hanging him using her hair as a noose, and he too returns as a ghost. He was not physically seen in The Grudge 3 except through archive footage.

=== Mar ===
Mar is a black cat that belonged to Toshio. Takeo drowned him (though he was originally microwaved to death in Ju-on: The Beginning of The End) along with Toshio. For this reason, his spirit is linked with Toshio's spirit. Mar’s appearance is usually to warn people of their impending doom. He has an extended and high-pitched meow, which occasionally comes out of Toshio's mouth. He was not seen in The Grudge 3 except for in archive footage.

== The Grudge ==
The Grudge is the first film in the series and a remake of the Japanese film Ju-on: The Grudge. It follows a similar storyline but with a different ending. The film focuses on Karen Davis, and revolves around Karen encountering the curse and trying to end it herself before all people around her die. Karen ends up being the only survivor.

=== Karen Davis ===
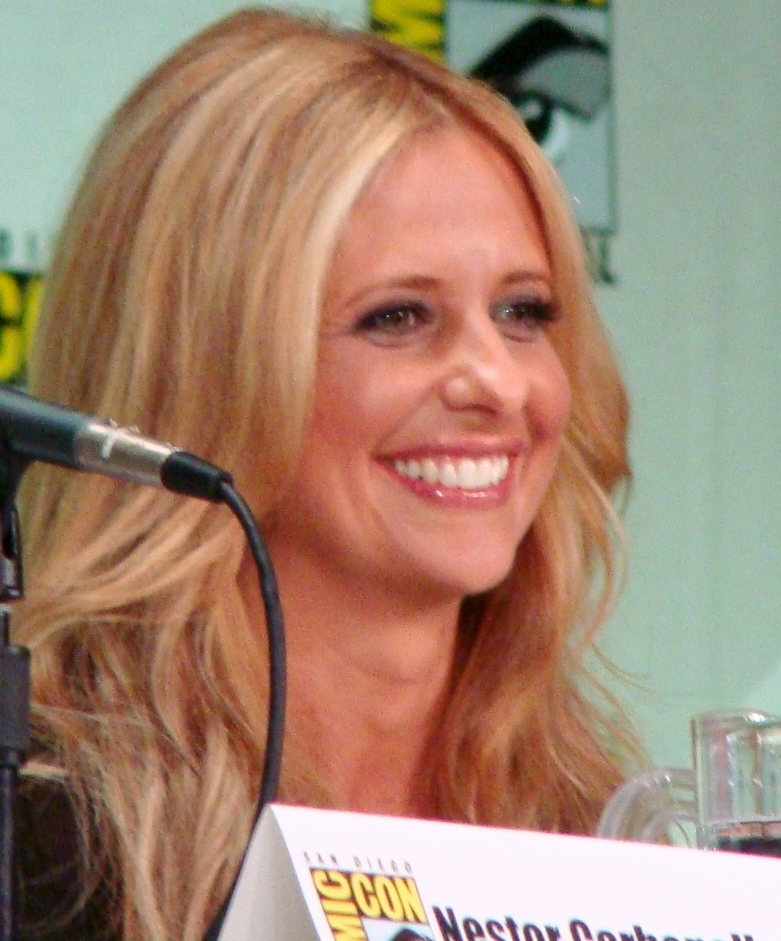
Gellar received praise for her performance as Karen in The Grudge.

Karen Davis (portrayed by Sarah Michelle Gellar) is the main protagonist in The Grudge. She starts as an American nurse who moves with her boyfriend to Tokyo. After the first nurse, Yoko, does not show up at work, she volunteers to take care of Emma Williams, which causes her to fall victim to the curse. When the curse starts claiming the people around her, she starts investigating the origin of the curse. She decides to head back to the house to keep her boyfriend, Doug, from falling to the grudge, but fails. Karen then tries to stop the curse by burning down the house, but this instead releases the curse. Karen is later placed in a Japanese hospital. She is strapped to a bed and constantly guarded by the police, as she is now paranoid, traumatized, and frantic to stop Kayako. She is visited by her sister Aubrey, who was sent by their mother. Later, a hand grabs her arm, causing Karen to panic. She frees herself and successfully evades the police while being chased by Kayako. When she reaches the roof of the hospital, she backs away to the edge of the roof and Kayako pushes her off, which results in Karen falling to her death. Later, by the end of The Grudge 2, just as Aubrey went back to the Saeki residence to confront Kayako, Aubrey spots Karen calling for Doug and follows her only to spot Takeo instead, who kills Aubrey by snapping her neck. Karen is the first one killed in The Grudge 2, and one of two characters other than ghosts to appear in multiple films.

=== Doug ===
Doug (portrayed by Jason Behr) is Karen's boyfriend who is studying at University of Tokyo, and works at the local bar to make ends meet. He lives with Karen and share a flat together. When Karen becomes obsessed with discovering what happened at the Saeki house, he grows worried and goes to the house to look for her, and is attacked offscreen. Karen later discovers him in a weakened state and tries to save him but fails when Kayako crawls down the stairs and kills him. Doug is the final one killed in the first film.

Doug is primarily an original character and has no Japanese counterpart in the original film, as Rika didn't have a boyfriend in the original film. However, his role in Karen's story does mirror that of Rika's friend Mariko in the original film, and they both have similar death scenes where they follow their respective protagonist to the Saeki house and are claimed by the curse as a result.

Doug reappears in The Grudge 2 via a photographic cameo.

=== Alex ===
Alex (portrayed by Ted Raimi) is Karen’s employer. He asked her to replace the missing Yoko. Later on, he entered the cursed house, where he found Emma Williams dead and Karen in a state of shock, and was the one to call the police. Later, while coming home after work, he spots a pool of blood on the floor and goes downstairs to investigate. After going down a little bit, he spotted a woman, revealed to be a disfigured Yoko without a lower jaw. As he screams in fear, she kills him, and the detectives later find his dead body along with Yoko's.

Alex is the American counterpart of Hirohashi, Rika's employer, from the original film. His death scene however is different from Hirohashi's, and is instead based on Noriko's death scene from Ju-On: The Curse where she is attacked and killed by the jaw-less ghost of Kanna.

He reappears in The Grudge 2 via a photographic cameo.

=== Nakagawa ===
Nakagawa (portrayed by Ryo Ishibashi) is a detective employed in Tokyo. He and his men are investigating Yoko’s disappearance, and some of the detectives working for him start to disappear as well. During investigation, he and his men discover a detached bottom jaw (later revealed to belong to Yoko), along with the bodies of several people, but a security video from Susan's office building is what convinces him that the history of the Saeki house is connected to the murders. When he enters the house with two tanks of gasoline, he becomes drawn by the sounds of Toshio being drowned, and goes upstairs to investigate. When he enters the bathroom, he finds a boy there, and attempts to save his life; however, while he does this, Takeo appears behind him, and drowns him like he did his son.

He is the American counterpart of Kenichi Nakagawa from the original film, though his storyline and death scene also mirrors that of Yuji Toyama from the original film as well, a character who also lost his colleagues to the curse and tried to burn the house down as a result. Unlike Toyama or Nakagawa though, his death is actually shown on-screen.

In The Grudge 2, he is briefly seen in a video Eason is watching. In the video, Eason spots a barely visible Kayako forming in the window of the door behind where the detective is sitting.

=== Igarashi ===
Igarashi (portrayed by Hiroshi Matsunaga) is a detective and the assistant of Nakagawa. In the film, he visited the Saeki house with Nakagawa and assisted him in the investigation. It is unknown if he got the curse from the Saeki family or if it killed him (it is vaguely confirmed in a deleted scene that he is indeed dead).

He is the American counterpart of Daisuke Igarashi from the original film.

=== Suzuki ===
Suzuki (portrayed by Hajime Okayama) is a real estate broker. In the film, he tries to sell the Saeki house to the Williams. When he tries to unblock the bath, the ghost of Toshio grabs his arm. It is unknown if he got the curse from him and it later killed him (though in a deleted scene, he is indeed confirmed dead).

He is the American counterpart of Tatsuya Suzuki, a character from Ju-On: The Curse, who was also a real-estate broker.

=== Matthew Williams ===
Matthew Williams (portrayed by William Mapother) is an American businessman who gets a job in Tokyo, Japan. His wife Jennifer dislikes their life in Japan, as she doesn’t speak the language or understand the culture; he assures her that if things don't improve, then they will go back to the United States. One day, when he comes home from work, he finds the house a total mess, and his wife in a weird trance on the bed. He tries to call for help, but is killed by Toshio before he could do anything. He is first possessed by Takeo, and he kicks Susan out of the house before dragging his wife's body up to the attic (in a deleted scene), where Toshio follows him. Later, Detective Nakagawa and his men discover his corpse along with his wife's in the attic.

He is the American counterpart of Katsuya Tokunaga from the original film.

=== Jennifer Williams ===
Jennifer Williams (portrayed by Clea DuVall) is married to Matthew Williams. She is unhappy in Japan because of her misunderstanding of the culture, inability to speak the language, and her dislike of Emma. Her husband Matthew assures her that they will go back to the US if things don't improve. While Matthew is at work, she is awoken by the sound of a bowl hitting the floor. After admonishing Emma for making the mess, she sees child's footprints going up the stairs, and follows them up to her (Toshio's former) bedroom. She is killed by Toshio, who suffocates her on her bed. Matthew then drags her body upstairs, which is later discovered alone with his by Detective Nakagawa. Their deaths are ruled as a murder suicide.

She is the American counterpart of Kazumi Tokunaga from the original film.

=== Emma Williams ===
Emma Williams (portrayed by Grace Zabriskie) is the mother of Matthew and Susan Williams. She is suffering from severe dementia and requires caretakers to watch over her. She is the only one of the Williams aware of the curse being there, but does and says nothing because of her condition. She has a habit of getting up and taking food whenever she pleases, and often leaves a mess behind, one time disturbing Jennifer with some noise she had made. She has only one line in the film before she is killed by the curse - "I just want her to leave me alone!".

She is the American counterpart of Sachie Tokunaga from the original film.

=== Susan Williams ===
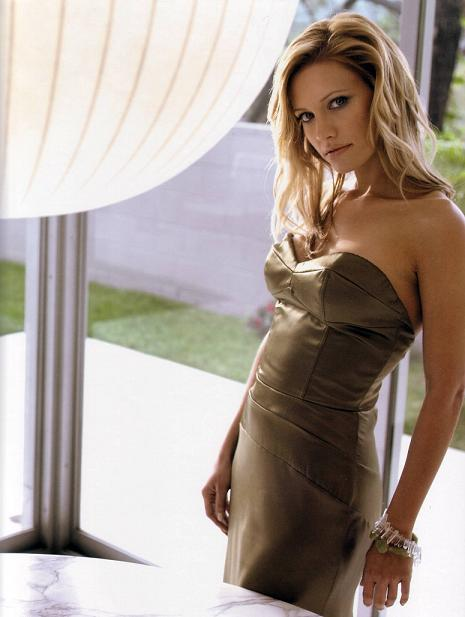
Strickland was cast for her success in her previous film Anacondas: The Hunt for the Blood Orchid.

Susan Williams (portrayed by KaDee Strickland) is the sister of Matthew Williams (William Mapother). She is a businesswoman employed in Tokyo. She becomes nervous when she is unable to contact Matthew, and the ghosts of Toshio and Kayako later play around with her, coming to her disturbance. After much running, and one attempt to get help, she resorts to hiding in her apartment under a duvet. She is killed by Kayako, who drags her under the duvet. She is the last of the Williams to die, and does not live in the Saeki house.

She is the American counterpart of Hitomi Tokunaga from the original film.

=== Peter Kirk ===
Peter Kirk (portrayed by Bill Pullman) was a lecturer at one of Tokyo's universities and Kayako's infatuation. When he went to the Saeki house, he found out about Kayako's obsession over him, and he found the family dead. The next day, in front of his wife Maria and in the early morning, he commits suicide by jumping off of his balcony. Whether or not he was possessed by the curse is unknown.

He is the American counterpart of Shunsuke Kobayashi, a character from Ju-On: The Curse.

=== Yoko ===
Yoko (portrayed by Yōko Maki) is a young Japanese nurse who can speak English and is volunteering at the Care Center; she is Karen's predecessor as Emma Williams caretaker. One day while she is nursing Emma, she spots the pile of garbage on the floor which she follows to the attic door. When she climbs upstairs, she glimpses Kayako who drags her to the attic and kills her. Later, Alex witnesses a woman stumbling about in the Care Centre. He notices straight away that there is something weird going on and he slips on something to discover the woman is dripping blood. Realizing it is Yoko, he asks her what happened, upon which she turns around to reveal her jawless face. Alex is later found dead. It is revealed that what actually killed Alex was Kayako, not Yoko's ghost, because Kayako possessed the corpse of Yoko and returned to claim victims in the Centre.

Yoko is primarily an original character, as Karen's Japanese counterpart Rika did not have a predecessor in the original film (Rika is hired as a replacement for Takashi, the previous social worker who disappeared, though his character is never seen). Her death scene is adapted from two characters in Ju-On: The Curse, as Kayako dragging her into the attic is based on Yuki's death, while her jaw-less ghost appearing and killing Alex is based on Kanna's death scene, where her jaw-less ghost haunts and kills her mother Noriko.

In a deleted scene, the morticians explain that because Yoko's blood had been covering Alex's corpse, it was only plausible that she killed him, even though this would require her to have survived for three days without her jaw.

She reappears in The Grudge 2 via a photographic cameo and as a voice cameo in The Grudge (2020), voiced by an unidentified actress.

=== Maria Kirk ===
Maria Kirk (portrayed by Rosa Blasi) is married to Peter Kirk. After waking up one morning, she witnesses her husband's suicide. Maria was later questioned by Karen regarding her husband before his death. She was also unaware of Kayako's love/obsession for Peter but is yet untouched by the curse as she has not entered the house herself.

Maria is very loosely based on Manami Kobayashi from Ju-On: The Curse, though unlike Manami, she is not pregnant nor is she murdered by Takeo.

== The Grudge 2 ==
=== Allison Fleming ===
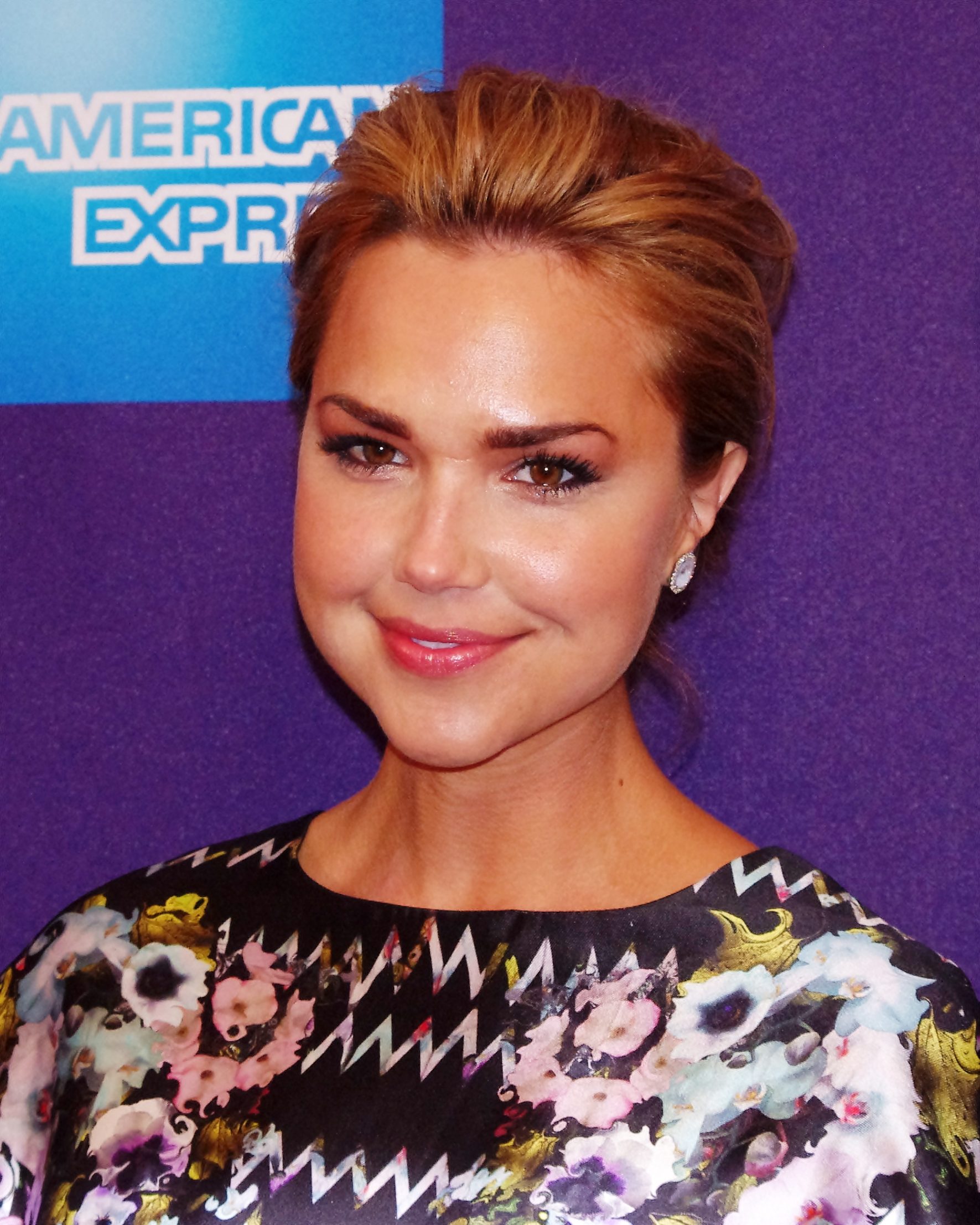
Arielle's performance was so positive she was nominated for a teen choice award.

Allison Fleming (portrayed by Arielle Kebbel) is a new American schoolgirl from Chicago, Illinois USA who attends Tokyo International School in Tokyo, Japan. Two popular American and Japanese schoolgirls, Vanessa and Miyuki, pretend to be her friends. They take her to the Saeki Family house and lock her in the closet, only to find that the door is stuck when they try to open it. She sees Aubrey's ghost there (which the audience is supposed to think is Kayako), and as a result the curse falls upon her. As the film goes on, she is constantly haunted by the curse, and it begins to take the lives of people around her, including Vanessa and Miyuki. She manages to avoid the curse through her entire stay at Japan, but nearly loses all of her sanity when Jake sees her being helped by her parents in the apartment complex hallway. During her stay in the apartments she is constantly tormented by Kayako, Toshio, Vanessa and Miyuki. She is finally killed by Kayako after a couple of nights at home; the ghost appears in the shadows of her own hood and takes her life right in front of Jake, then proceeds to attack him.

Allison is the cause of the curse gathering in the apartment complex in the first place. It is quite possible that her parents were cursed by her, and her parents later spread the curse to Jake's parents while they were together at a dinner they were talking about going out to. Allison is the final one killed in the second film.

In The Grudge 3, it is revealed that Allison's body was never found.

She is the American counterpart of Izumi Toyama from Ju-On: The Grudge.

=== Aubrey Davis ===
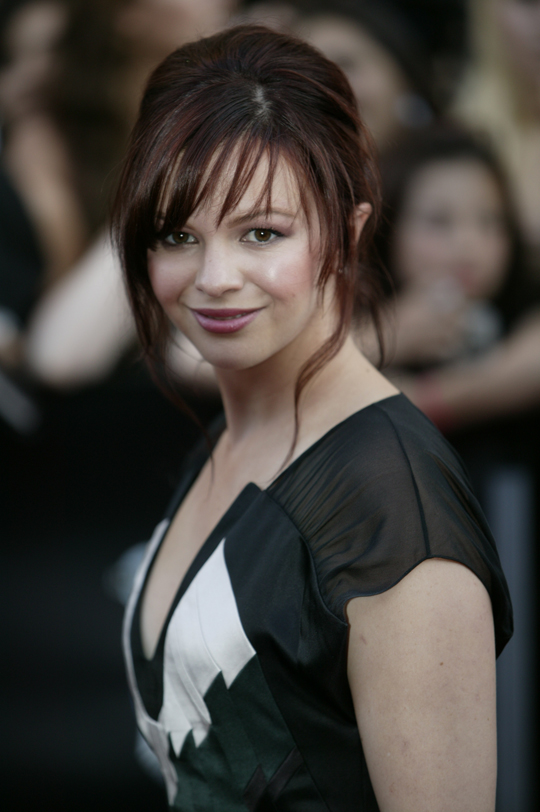
Amber Tamblyn made her Japanese remake debut in 2002's The Ring as Katie Embry.

Aubrey Davis (portrayed by Amber Tamblyn) is Karen's younger sister and the protagonist of The Grudge 2. She lives in Pasadena, California and is one day called to her Mother's house. Mrs. Davis tells Aubrey what has happened to Karen and Doug before announcing that she will be flying to Tokyo, Japan to bring Karen back. Aubrey is pushed to investigate Karen's death (after Karen is pushed off the roof of the hospital building by Kayako) and at least try to stop Kayako's curse. During her visit to the Saeki House, she mysteriously gets warped back in time to the night of the first murders. There, she is violently killed by Takeo Saeki in exactly the same manner as Kayako was. She turned into a ghost because she died out of extreme sorrow and pain. From that point on, she replaces Kayako until Allison comes face to face with her. Whether she still resides in the house as Kayako's replacement is unknown, though it is strongly implied that her ghost assimilated with Kayako’s and is now part of the curse as well.

=== Vanessa Cassidy ===
Vanessa Cassidy (portrayed by Teresa Palmer) is a popular and deceitful American schoolgirl who attends Tokyo International High School with Allison and Miyuki. She and Miyuki attempt to snap a picture of Allison frightened at the old house as a prank. When Allison screams in terror, Vanessa flees panic, followed by Miyuki. At school, she and a group of other girls harass Allison when they heard she had to go and see the school shrink. The curse, however, does not cease to taunt her as it does Miyuki and Allison; she is taken by Kayako after trying to make a call in a phone booth. Later, she and Miyuki appear as ghosts in Principal Dale's office (who is a ghost as well) while Allison is there. Vanessa and Miyuki continue to haunt Allison until her death.

Vanessa is primarily an original character as she has virtually nothing in common with the schoolgirls from the Japanese original film (Chiharu or Miyuki). Her death scene however is directly based on that of Mizuho Tamura from Ju-on: The Curse (2000).

=== Miyuki Nazawa ===
Miyuki Nazawa (portrayed by Misako Uno) is a Japanese schoolgirl from Tokyo International High School, and one of Vanessa's best friends. She assists her in playing a mean prank on their classmate Allison Fleming, although she seems to be rather unsure of their visit at the Saeki house. She gets the curse for being in the house, and is the first of the 3 schoolgirls to be killed. When Allison is in Principal Dale's office for around the third time, she sees Miyuki, Vanessa, and her principal as ghosts.

Miyuki is very loosely based on the character of the same name from Ju-On: The Grudge, though unlike her, Miyuki dies in the American remake.

=== Eason ===
Eason (portrayed by Edison Chen) is a Hong Kong journalist who is researching the paranormal events created from Kayako's curse. He was the one who rescued Karen from the house's fire, and introduces himself to Aubrey when she goes to the hospital. During her stay in Japan, he asks Aubrey questions about the curse, and also supports her as a friend. After a little while, he discovers that the fire that Karen set to the house didn't eliminate the curse, stating that instead it worsened something. He was killed by Kayako in his dark room, when Kayako emerged from one of the photos. His corpse is later found by Aubrey, which is then possessed by Kayako and nearly kills her.

=== Jake Kimble ===
Jake Kimble (portrayed by Matthew Knight) is a young boy who lives in an apartment in Chicago along with Bill, his father, Lacey, his sister, and Trish, his stepmother, who has just moved in. In The Grudge 2, he discovers strange occurrences in his apartment, and grows more and more disturbed by them as the movie goes on. At the end of the film, he finds the corpses of his father and sister, and witnesses his stepmother being drowned by Toshio. When he finds Allison in the hallway, he asks her what she brought to Chicago with her, and she only replies "it followed me here" before being killed by Kayako, who then attacks Jake immediately after.

In The Grudge 3, Jake is hospitalized in an insane asylum. He has become as paranoid and traumatized as both Karen and Allison were after being exposed to the curse for too long. He ends up killed by Kayako at the beginning of the film by being thrown around the room by the invisible Kayako, and the curse is reborn in his apartment. Jake was the only one who survived in The Grudge 2 (presumably; there are some characters where it is unstated what happened to them) and the first killed in The Grudge 3 He and Karen are the only characters (besides the Saeki ghosts) to appear in more than one film.

=== Trish Kimble ===
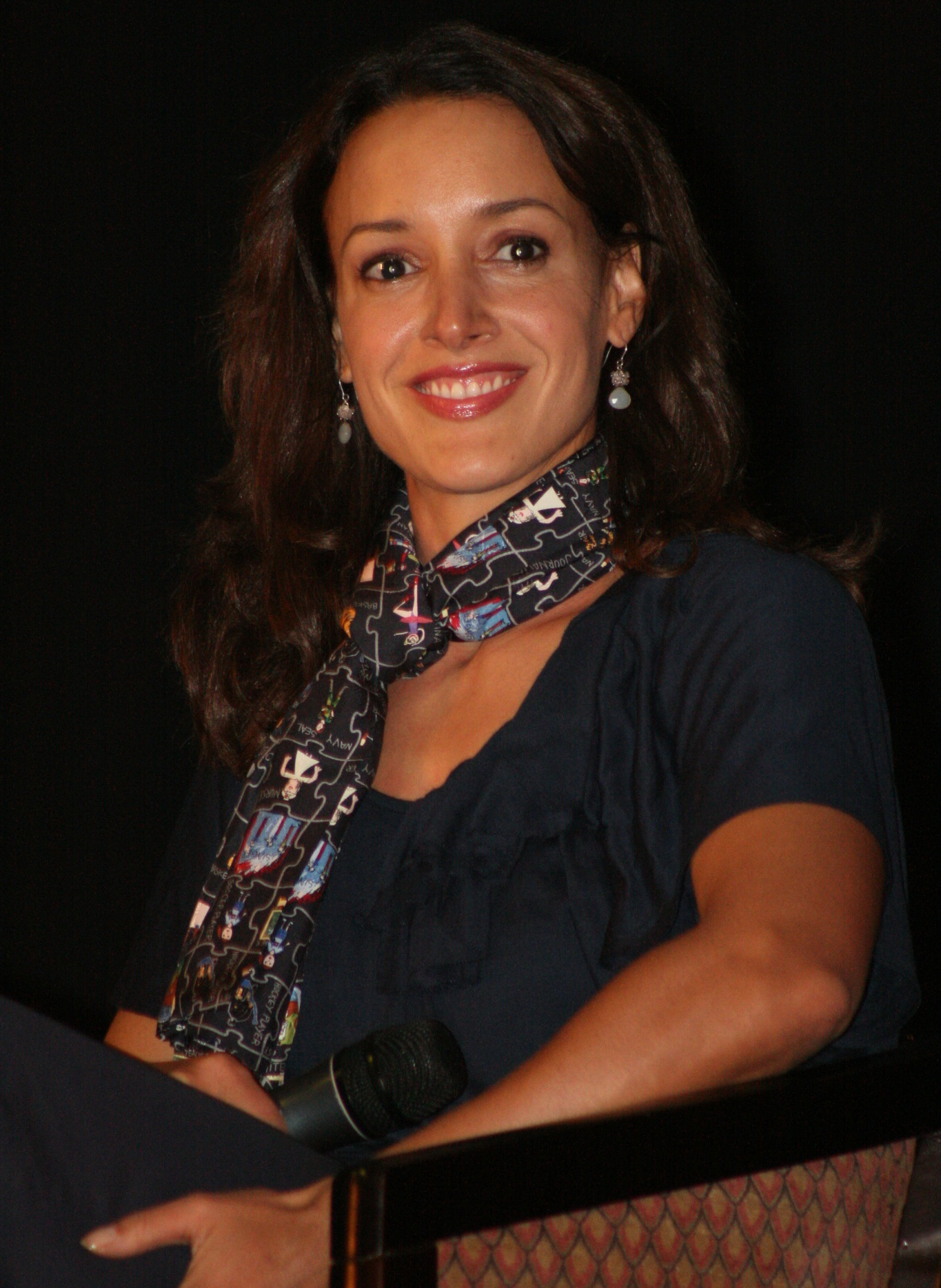
Jennifer Beals in The Grudge 2

Trish Kimble (portrayed by Jennifer Beals) is Jake and Lacey's new step mother and Bill's second wife. She is a kind, tender woman to begin with, but she scares Jake, and seems to have a bad relationship with him. When the curse arrives at the apartment complex, the noises in the apartment begin to disturb her, and later she becomes under the influence of Kayako, which prompts her to kill her husband. Later, Jake finds her in a bathtub with a blank look, revealing the curse's presence upon her to him. She is killed by Toshio, who drowns her in the bathtub.

In The Grudge 3, it is revealed that Trish became the primary suspect of the deaths in murder-suicide act.

Trish is the American counterpart of Yoshimi Kitada from Ju-On: The Curse.

=== Bill Kimble ===
Bill Kimble (portrayed by Christopher Cousins) is Jake's father. He is a kind, loving family man, but later becomes influenced by Takeo. This begins to show more when he starts to act strangely and not like himself; his influence by the spirit is indicated when he overhears Trish talking on the phone with a man named Nate, and begins to squeeze his keys in his fist to the point where he makes his hand bleed. From that point on, he thinks his wife is having an affair, and scolds her about it the following morning, while she is making him breakfast. When he yells at her for burning his bacon, she (being under Kayako's influence) kills him. Jake later finds his corpse in his parents' bedroom.

He is the American counterpart of Hiroshi Kitada from Ju-On: The Curse.

=== Lacey Kimble ===
Lacey Kimble (portrayed by Sarah Roemer) is a young cheerleader and Jake's older sister. She cares a lot about her brother, and spends a night with him when he is awakened and frightened by the banging next door. Jake looks up to her, appearing to see her as the only one who understands what he is dealing with, but she is unaware and unaffected by the curse until the very end. Jake later finds her dead with her head hanging in water in a bathtub, indicating that the curse had murdered her by drowning her.

In The Grudge 3, it is revealed that Lacey was murdered by Trish.

=== Nakagawa Kawamata ===
Nakagawa Kawamata (portrayed by Kim Miyori) is an Itako, Kayako and Naoko's mother, Toshio's maternal grandmother and Takeo and Daisuke's mother-in-law. She used her daughter to "eat" the evil spirits she drove from her patients, marking Kayako for the rest of her life. In the film, she explains to Aubrey Davis that it is not her fault the curse was created, but rather because her daughter was foolish and was killed out of Takeo's rage, and that there is no way to stop it. She is then killed by Kayako's vengeful spirit, although it looked as if she died of a heart attack.

=== Mrs. Davis ===
Mrs. Davis (portrayed by Joanna Cassidy) is the mother of Karen and Aubrey. She is extremely sick and is never seen out of bed once in the film. Since she cannot go to Japan to search for Karen herself, she sends Aubrey to do the job for her. Mrs. Davis sees Karen as far superior to Aubrey, and often makes rude comments to Aubrey, even during their final conversation together before Aubrey's death. She is one of only a few characters to never encounter the curse, but it is unknown if her illness killed her in the near future. Also, it is unknown if she knows about Aubrey's death. In the alternate ending (unrated version) the curse travels all the way to Pasadena to claim her.

=== Sally ===
Sally (portrayed by Jenna Dewan) is Lacey's best friend who resides in one of the next door apartments. She is first seen as a friendly, helpful girl, but later falls under the influence of the curse. Later in the movie, Lacey goes to her apartment to show her how she looks in her cheerleading outfit, only to find her drinking milk from a gallon jug, and then regurgitating it back into the jug with a ghostly look on her face. She is later killed in the same way Jennifer Williams was in the first Grudge film. It is unknown how she encountered the curse.

=== Mrs. Dale ===
Mrs. Dale (portrayed by Eve Gordon) is the calm but ghostly principal of Tokyo International High School. Allison is called to her office a couple of times in the film, reluctant to tell her what is wrong & only saying that she wants to go home. The principal tells Allison that what is haunting her isn't real; she claimed to have been in the Saeki house with police, and that it's just an old, abandoned house. However, this quickly proves to be false when two ghosts of Vanessa and Miyuki appear next to her and she becomes a ghost herself, indicating that the curse had already killed her along with the others.

=== Sotaro ===
Sotaro (portrayed by Sotaro Nagasawa) is the teacher of Japanese in Tokyo International High School. During his lesson Allison and Miyuki are persecuted by the ghosts of Toshio and Mar. He never encountered the curse himself.

=== Michael ===
Michael (portrayed by Shaun Sipos) is Miyuki's caring but rather lustful boyfriend. On the night of Miyuki's death, he brings her to a love hotel. Miyuki finds a condom on the bed while he is showering, indicating that he was clearly planning on having sex with her that night. He is still showering while the curse kills Miyuki, and claims that she just disappeared when he got out. It is unknown if he got the curse from her or if it later killed him.

=== John and Annie Fleming ===
John and Annie Fleming (portrayed by Gwen Lorenzetti and Paul Jarrett) are the parents of Allison. When Bill and his family first move in, they are very friendly and welcoming towards them. Later in the film, Jake spots them helping Allison to their apartment; when he says hi to Mr. Fleming, he simply turns around, gives a momentary glance, and keeps walking. Jake later tells Lacey that they were acting "really weird." They do not appear again in the film, and it is unknown if the curse kills them like it did Allison. It is quite possible that the Flemings and the Kimbles did indeed go out for dinner, and the Flemings had gotten the curse from Allison, then spread it to the Kimbles. In the alternate ending, we discovered the Flemings’ house is now-silent, indicating that Mr. and Mrs. Fleming are dead.

In The Grudge 3, it is revealed that John and Annie were killed by Trish.

=== Mishima ===
Mishima (portrayed by Zen Kajihara) is a friend of Eason and has a very large interest in folklore. Eason goes to him when he and Aubrey have questions about the curse and Kayako's past history, and he provides them with some information. He himself never went into the house, nor does he have any lines, so it is assumed that he never encountered the curse himself.

== The Grudge 3 ==
=== Lisa ===
Lisa and her asthmatic sister Rose

Lisa (portrayed by Johanna Braddy) is the main protagonist of The Grudge 3 who lives in the same building as Jake. She is the sister of Max and Rose. She appeared to be living in the apartment for some time, knowing most of the residents such as Jake and Allison Flemming (rarely meeting the latter). At the time of the events of The Grudge 3, she had been intending to leave Chicago for New York with her boyfriend to work as a fashion model so she can win the scholarship money to pay for Rose's medical bills. She becomes rather uncomfortable with Rose saying that a new boy had moved into the building despite not hearing any of it before. She later finds out the 'new boy' is in fact Toshio after running into him on the floor Jake's apartment is on. Lisa is one of the two survivors of the apartment, though she does not know that Rose's body also houses Kayako's spirit.

=== Rose ===
Rose (portrayed by Jadie Rose Hobson) is an 8-year-old girl who has asthma attacks. She is Lisa and Max's little sister. At the end, Rose asks Lisa if they will be safe and Lisa assures her that they will be, embracing her. As the camera moves, it is revealed that Lisa is now hugging Kayako, her curse now contained in Rose's body. Rose was the only one to stop the curse throughout the films. She is still alive, despite that Kayako is shown instead of her. It is implied that when she gets older, Kayako will take over her body to get her own body back.

=== Dr. Francine Sullivan ===
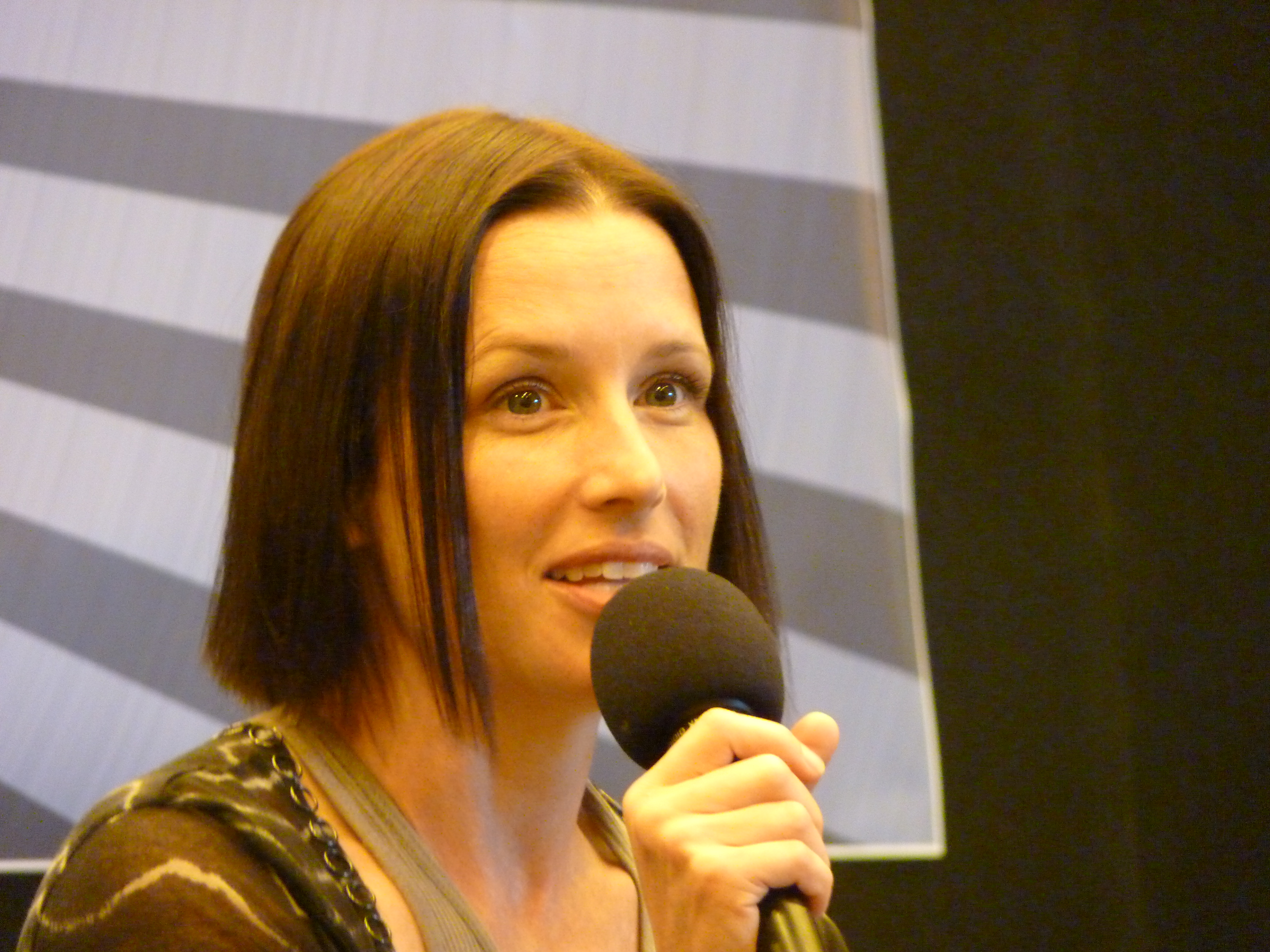
Despite the film's mixed to negative reception Smith's performance was praised.

Dr. Francine Sullivan (portrayed by Shawnee Smith) is Jake's case worker. Since Jake was put in mental care, Dr. Sullivan attempted to ease him, believing that Jake's stories of Kayako killing his family was merely him hallucinating his stepmother Trish killing them instead (due to the police suspecting Trish to be the murderer). Her assumptions are proved wrong when she is urgently called to Jake's room by a security guard, only to see Jake dead along with every bone in his body broken. Sullivan later investigates Jake's apartment and is the one who tells Lisa about Jake's horrible and abnormal death. She also informs Lisa that the 'new boy' Lisa saw in her apartment is in fact dead after revealing a photo of Toshio in a newspaper, revealing Toshio died years ago. Sullivan later sees unusual visions in the surveillance cameras viewing the hallways of the facility and investigates, only to be chased by Kayako once getting there. She attempts to escape but is killed when the final door she attempts to open does not respond despite yelling out to the cleaner just outside for help. Lisa calls for Sullivan after she is kicked out of her apartment, but learns that she had been killed.

=== Naoko Kawamata ===
Naoko (portrayed by Emi Ikehata) is Kayako's younger sister. For Naoko, growing up in their mother's care was "frightening", but for Kayako it was a living nightmare. She knows of the curse and how to end it once and for all, having presumably taken up her mother’s teachings on how to be an Itako. She is also in possession of Kayako’s diary, having somehow acquired it in between the events of the second and third film.

She finds a newspaper clipping taped to her work desk by her co-workers, in an attempt to shame her. Learning of the young Matthew Kimble’s death, she travels to Chicago in an attempt to end the curse. Killed in rage by a possessed Max (in a fashion similar to her sister's death), she is resurrected as a new Onryō. With Kayako's curse now contained inside Rose's body, Naoko's curse has taken its place and now haunts the Chicago apartments.

=== Daisuke ===
Daisuke (portrayed by Takatsuna Mukai) is the widowed husband of Naoko. He appeared briefly trying to convince Naoko to stay in Tokyo and fearing for her safety because she was attempting to stop the curse. In the end, he finally agrees to let her move to Chicago. He never encountered the curse himself nor did he visit the Saeki house. It is unknown if he is aware of Naoko's death.

=== Max ===
Max (portrayed by Gil McKinney) is the landlord of the Chicago building. It appears Max was the landlord of the apartment for some time and it is presumed he did fairly well in his job before the chaos Kayako, Takeo and Toshio began causing at around the events between the second and the third films. The spirits caused many people in the apartment to either die, go missing or simply move, bringing Max into hard times, not to mention that the flow of new residents was at an all-time low. Max is revealed to be on the brink of being fired and does what he can to keep the building together. He introduces Naoko to the building (having no idea what she came for) though he does not tell her why the apartment itself seems rather empty of residents. Throughout the film, it becomes clear Max is possessed by Takeo, showing signs of extreme anger, resentfulness and other signs of odd behavior and frightening Rose and Lisa. His possession also leads to getting fired after he pushed his boss into a pile of bricks. Max, being possessed, also interrupts the ceremony Naoko attempts to get rid of Takeo, Toshio and Kayako's spirits. He unknowingly kills Naoko in the similar way Takeo killed Kayako and after Takeo's spirit is finally banished, he breaks down in tears after seeing that he was responsible for Naoko's death. He is shortly attacked by Naoko, who has taken the form of a ghost, similar to that of her sister Kayako. Max is the final one killed in whole trilogy films.

=== Andy ===
Andy (portrayed by Beau Mirchoff) is Lisa's boyfriend. He was very unaware of the curse in the apartments and seems to not care about the deaths and disappearances that much. He and Lisa were going to go to New York, but a worried Lisa had to take care of her family, so they stayed. Right after he reassures Lisa everything will be alright, he walks back to his apartment, only to find Toshio's running legs up the stairs. He follows them, and goes into the room. He is then killed by Kayako's ghost. His body is later found by Lisa and Rose and is then possessed by Kayako to kill Lisa.

=== Gretchen ===
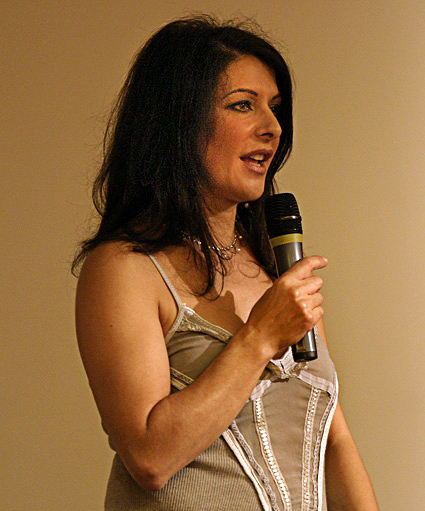
Marina Sirtis's first horror film appearance

Gretchen (portrayed by Marina Sirtis) is a neighbor of Lisa, Rose, and Max, and a painter. She is often hired as a guardian to Rose when Max or Lisa are busy. Gretchen appears to be friends with Max, and is killed by Kayako in her apartment while she was painting a picture of Rose. Her body was later found by Max and taken away by paramedics. Gretchen's death triggers Max's possession.

=== Brenda ===
Brenda (portrayed by Mihaela Nankova) and her mother move out of the Chicago building after Brenda starts seeing the ghosts of Kayako and Toshio. She may have had extra-sensory perception or a feeling of impending doom as evidenced by her reluctance to speak. It's likely that she has post-traumatic stress disorder resulting from her encounters with the ghosts, leaving her mute. She also seems to have lost her appetite, barely touching her mother's Chinese food dinner. She is killed by being dragged into her bathtub, and drowned by Takeo's evil spirit while her mother was unpacking. It is unknown if Brenda's mother is also killed by the curse.

=== Renee ===
Renee (portrayed by Laura Giosh) is the mother of the silent Brenda and one of the few tenants left in the apartment. Because the Kimble family deaths frightened Brenda and because Brenda continuously saw Kayako and Toshio, she finally decided to move out of the apartments. She had no ill feelings towards Max, as they were on good terms with her moving out. Renee tries to get Brenda to talk over a Chinese food dinner but she remains unresponsive. She prepares Brenda a bath to help her relax, and while unpacking at her new home she hears a struggle in the bathroom and discovers Brenda has vanished. It is unknown what became of her, but because she had lived in the cursed apartment, it's highly likely that she was later killed.

=== Ben ===
Ben (portrayed by Mike Straub) is a security guard and the assistant of Dr. Sullivan. After he sees Kayako kill Jake through the camera, he calls to Dr. Sullivan and both are shocked to see Jake's mangled corpse. Later when Kayako is chasing Dr. Sullivan, Dr. Sullivan begs him to open the door to save her, but he was busy cleaning the floor and did not hear her. It is unknown if he is aware of Dr. Sullivan‘s death.

=== Mr. Praski ===
Mr. Praski (portrayed by Michael McCoy) is Max's boss. He wanted to give the apartment to a company due to the deaths, disappearances, the leaving tenants, and the loss of money, but he settled to give Max one last chance. After Gretchen's death he views Max as unfit to be landlord and fires him. A possessed Max pushes him into a pile of bricks. Shortly after the incident, Toshio kills him in his car.

He is the American counterpart of Detective Kamio of Ju-On: The Curse.

== The Grudge (2020 film) ==
=== Detective Muldoon ===
Muldoon, still mourning the loss of her husband who died of cancer 3 months prior, had relocated to a new home with her son Burke to hopefully start anew and live closer to her job. She is a rookie cop working for the Police Department.

Muldoon is eventually assigned a new partner in Detective Goodman, and they’re assigned to investigate a case involving the corpse of Lorna Moody, which had been found rotting in a wrecked car in the middle of the forest. Learning that Lorna had last been seen at 44 Reyburn Drive, Muldoon intended to investigate the house, but Goodman refused to accompany her, as he knew about the rumors of the house being cursed and wanted nothing to do with it or the case.

42274F5E-CEFE-425D-9AF6-9CE73731FF72.jpeg Muldoon confronting a disheveled and catatonic Faith. Arriving at the address, Muldoon proceeded to knock on the door, but let herself in when she began hearing Faith Matheson moaning and crying inside. She finds Faith, completely catatonic, and William’s rotting corpse. She calls for backup and Faith is hospitalized shortly after. On her way back home from the house, she spots the mysterious apparition of Nina Spencer alongside the road, holding her never-born son. She also sees the ghost of Melinda Landers on the road and nearly loses control of the car trying to avoid hitting her.

As she’s further investigating the case and the history of the house, Muldoon is now being haunted by the ghosts of the Landers family, such as seeing Sam Landers in a dark room and Fiona Landers briefly pushing her head into the sink trying to drown her.

Muldoon’s research leads her to interrogating Detective Wilson, now a patient at a mental hospital, who was the former partner of Goodman who was traumatized after coming into contact with the curse. He tells her that anybody who goes into the house is doomed to die as a victim of the curse. Shortly after she leaves, Wilson then gouges his eyes out so that he can stop seeing the ghosts.

Muldoon then listens to the tapes that Wilson had recorded during his investigation, learning about the background of the curse, which originated in Japan when Takeo Saeki had murdered his wife Kayako Saeki and his son Toshio Saeki. The deaths had created a curse, which had been brought to America with Fiona Landers when she returned to Pennsylvania. Wilson had been in contact with Detective Nakagawa, who told him about the grisly murders and how he believed the curse had taken his colleagues.

Fearing for her son’s life, Muldoon ultimately decides to try and end the curse by dousing the house in gasoline and setting it ablaze, seeing visions of Fiona murdering her family in the process. As she’s about to drop the lighter, Burke seemingly steps inside to confront her. Muldoon quickly realizes it’s not him when he fails to repeat a phrase they use regularly (What do we do when we’re scared? We close our eyes and count to 5). As the illusion fades, revealing that it was Melinda’s ghost the whole time, the house is burned down to the ground, and Muldoon embraces the real Burke outside.

A little while later, Muldoon hugs Burke who is getting ready for school, but another Burke in the background grabs his backpack and says goodbye to his mother as he steps out to catch his bus. The “Burke” she was hugging is revealed to be Melinda’s ghost, and then Muldoon is promptly attacked by Fiona’s ghost, leaving her fate unknown.

=== Detective Goodman ===
- Status: Alive
- Faction: Humanity

Detective Goodman (Demián Bichir)

=== Peter Spencer ===
- Status: Deceased
- Faction: Humanity

Peter Spencer (John Cho)

=== Detective Wilson ===
- Status: Deceased
- Faction: Humanity

Detective Wilson (William Sadler)

=== William Matheson ===
- Status: Deceased
- Faction: Humanity

William Matheson (Frankie Faison)

=== Faith Matheson ===
- Status: Deceased
- Faction: Humanity

Faith Matheson (Lin Shaye)
