= Katasumi and 4444444444 =

Two 1998 Japanese short horror films

Katasumi / 4444444444
- DVD cover
- Directed by: Takashi Shimizu
- Written by: Takashi Shimizu
- Produced by: Yasuyuki Uemura
- Starring: Katasumi: Ayako Omura; Kanna Kashima; Takako Fuji; 4444444444: Kazushi Andō; Daiki Sawada
- Cinematography: Takahide Shibanushi
- Music by: Gary Ashiya; Hitomi Shimizu
- Distributed by: Kansai Television
- Release date: September 27, 1998
- Running time: 3 minutes each
- Country: Japan
- Language: Japanese

Katasumi (Note: 片隅, In a Corner) and 4444444444 (Note: Ten Fours) are two 1998 Japanese short horror films written and directed by Takashi Shimizu. The films are known for spawning Shimizu's horror franchise Ju-On, which was in turn adapted into the American horror franchise The Grudge.

== Plots ==
=== Katasumi ===
Two schoolgirls, Hisayo Yoshida and Kanna Murakami, are tasked with caring for the school's pet rabbits. They are sweeping out the cages and feeding the rabbits when Kanna suddenly cuts her hand. Hisayo leaves to fetch a bandage for Kanna. When she returns, Kanna is nowhere to be found, the rabbit cages are empty, and blood and fur is strewn about. Hisayo then sees a creature that looks like a woman (Note: Named as Kayako Saeki in later films.) crawling towards her from the far side of the rabbit enclosure. As she backs into a corner, she finds Kanna's corpse amongst the debris. She brandishes a trowel at the woman, who closes in on her. Kanna then moves her bloodied head and watches as Hisayo cowers in the corner. The screen fades to black with Hisayo's fate left ambiguous.

=== 4444444444 ===
A young man (Note: Named as Tsuyoshi Murakami in later films.) rides his bicycle home. As he rounds a corner in front of an apparently abandoned house, he hears a phone ringing, but cannot see it. He looks through a garbage pile next to the darkened entrance of the building, finding the phone after several rings. The phone displays an incoming call from the number 4444444444. (Note: Assumed to be referencing the widespread East Asian superstition that the number 4 is an omen of death or bad luck.) The man answers the phone only to hear rasping, cat-like sounds from the other end. After attempting to communicate with the caller, he hangs up.

Seconds later, the phone rings again, and the man answers. He gets frustrated and begins to believe he is being pranked. As he sits on the steps in front of the deserted house, he continues his attempts to identify the caller. Looking around nervously, he asks, "Are you... watching me?" A voice replies, "I am." The voice does not come from the phone. The man slowly turns around to see a pale young boy (Note: Named as Toshio Saeki in later films.) beside him, drumming his fingers on his knees. The man looks startled and the camera lingers on the boy for a moment before zooming in quickly, as the boy opens his mouth to emit a cat-like scream while a black tar-like substance oozes from his lips.

== Cast ==
=== Katasumi ===
- Ayako Omura as Hisayo Yoshida (Note: Credited as Ayako Oomura.)
- Kanna Kashima as Kanna Murakami
- Takako Fuji as Kayako Saeki

=== 4444444444 ===
- Kazushi Ando as Tsuyoshi Murakami
- Daiki Sawada as Toshio Saeki

== Production ==
Takashi Shimizu was working as an assistant director and first got involved in what would become the Ju-On franchise when filmmaker Kiyoshi Kurosawa, who was teaching a filmmaking class attended by Shimizu, was impressed by a three-minute short film Shimizu had written and directed. When Kurosawa learned that a producer he knew had just commissioned a feature-length horror film for Kansai Television, he recommended Shimizu for the job of directing one or more sections of the film.

Shimizu wrote several scripts, each roughly 30 minutes in length, only to be asked to make two brief three-minute segments as the television movie was intended to be an anthology of short films. After being edited together, the collection of four short films (one directed by Kurosawa) was titled Gakkô no kaidan G. (Note: This translates to School Ghost Story G, with the "G" supposedly standing for "Great".)

While it is often claimed that the subsequent feature-length films Ju-On: The Curse and Ju-On: The Curse 2 are remakes of Katasumi and 4444444444, Shimizu has said that the two short films are actually precursors to the franchise, and that they act "almost like the true prequel of the story". Katasumi marks the first appearance of actress Takako Fuji, who was then unknown, as Kayako Saeki; she would reprise the role for every Ju-On production and adaptation until The Grudge 2.

== Release ==
The films were first broadcast on Kansai Television as part of the anthology film Gakkô no kaidan G on September 27, 1998. Gakkô no kaidan G ran for around 70 minutes, meaning that Shimizu's films Katasumi and 4444444444 made up just under 10% of the finished product.

Katasumi and 4444444444 were released in the U.S. for the first time on May 17, 2005, appearing as additional features on the unrated director's cut DVD of The Grudge. Katasumi is listed on this DVD under the English translation of its title, In a Corner.

On September 1, 2005, Katasumi was released in Germany for the first time.
