= Toshio Saeki =

- Ju-on character
- Yuya Ozeki as Toshio Saeki
- First appearance: 4444444444 (1998)
- Last appearance: Sadako vs. Kayako (2016); The Grudge (2020; hand only)
- Created by: Takashi Shimizu
- Portrayed by: Daiki Sawada (4444444444); Ryōta Koyama (Ju-on: The Curse, Ju-on: The Curse 2); Yuya Ozeki (Ju-on: The Grudge, Ju-on: The Grudge 2, The Grudge); Ohga Tanaka (The Grudge 2); Shimba Tsuchiya (The Grudge 3); Shūsei Uto (Ju-On: White Ghost, Ju-On: Black Ghost); Kai Kobayashi (Ju-on: Beginning of the End, Ju-on: The Final Curse); Garrett Masuda (Scary Movie 4); Rintaro Shibamoto (Sadako vs. Kayako)

In-universe information
- Full name: Toshio Saeki; Toshio Yamada (reboot only)
- Species: Human (formerly); Onryō
- Gender: Male
- Occupation: Elementary school student
- Family: Takeo Saeki (father); Kayako Saeki (mother); Mar (pet cat); Nakagawa Kawamata (grandmother; American version only); Naoko Kawamata (aunt; American version only); Daisuke (uncle; American version only)
- Relatives: Rose Morrison (love interest)
- Nationality: Japanese

Toshio Saeki (佐伯 俊雄, Saeki Toshio) is a character from the Ju-on franchise, created by Takashi Shimizu. He was played by several child actors, including Daiki Sawada in the short movie 4444444444, Ryōta Koyama in the original two V-Cinema movies, Yuya Ozeki in the theatrical movies and The Grudge, Ohga Tanaka in The Grudge 2, Shimba Tsuchiya in The Grudge 3, Shūsei Uto in Ju-on: White Ghost and Ju-on: Black Ghost, Kai Kobayashi in the 2014 Japanese reboot Ju-on: The Beginning of the End, and Garrett Masuda in the parody Scary Movie 4. He is characterized by his pitch-black eyes, pale skin, and the haunting meowing sounds he makes due to owning a pet cat named, Mar, after being drowned in a bathtub by Takeo Saeki.

== Overview ==
He can be considered a prominent character in the series, second to Kayako, his mother. His first appearance was in Takashi Shimizu's short movie 4444444444 and his haunting goes all through the franchise series in a house in Nerima, Japan. He is one of the enactors of the curse, which states that when someone dies amidst rage and intense wrath, those feelings remain at the death site and kill whoever it touches.

His next appearance was in The Grudge 3, played by Shimba Tsuchiya. He also has a guest appearance in Ju-on: White Ghost and Ju-on: Black Ghost respectively, the 2009 Japanese sequels and both are played by Shūsei Uto.

Toshio has his first major appearance in the 2014 reboot Ju-on: The Beginning of the End and its sequel Ju-on: The Final Curse, where unlike the previous films, he is the main antagonist and the ultimate cause behind the curse.

He makes an appearance in Sadako vs. Kayako, played by Rintaro Shibamoto. He joins in with Kayako, with their contrasted enemy, Sadako Yamamura. Takeo Saeki does not appear in this film.

== History and characteristics ==
=== Japanese timeline ===
Toshio was born to Takeo and Kayako Saeki, a Japanese couple residing in Nerima City, Tokyo on July 27, 1987. He was named after his mother's crush (Shunsuke, 俊介), afterward adding a character from his father's name (Takeo, 剛雄) to avoid suspicion.

To commemorate Toshio's first day at elementary school, Kayako got him a black kitten that he named Mar. His father, despite being displeased with this, did not object to keeping the pet.

His teacher happened to be his mother's old crush, and their meeting rekindled the woman's feelings. Takeo discovered her journal, in which she wrote of her love for Kobayashi. Furious, Takeo believed that Kayako was cheating on him and that Toshio was not his son.

When Kayako came home that day, Takeo stabbed her to death. Takeo took Mar from Toshio and killed it with the same box cutter used previously to torture Kayako, then buried the cat in the dirt path beside their house. After Toshio was sent to his room, he escaped to the attic, where Takeo left him to die. There, Toshio found his mother's corpse and was shortly after spirited away by her ghost.

This begins a curse upon that house, in which the ghosts of Kayako, Toshio and Takeo (who is killed by Kayako soon after her murder) attack people who enter, re-enacting the murders and following the victims wherever they go. In no portrayal of the ghosts do victims ever attempt to fight back.

Toshio is often seen outside of the house without clothing and as chalk-white as his mother. He usually just haunts his victims – instead of killing them, he spirits them away.

==== 2014 reboot ====
The 2014 reboot Ju-on: The Beginning of the End gives an entirely different backstory for Toshio and the Saeki family as a whole. In the film, before the Saeki family even moved in, there was another family who resided there: the Yamaga, whose eldest son, Toshio, was found dead in the second-floor closet during a heat wave. Thus, the house's curse is not entirely caused by the Saeki family, as a group of four schoolgirls who visited the house were killed solely by Toshio. Toshio is also the ultimate cause of the Saeki murders, as he became Kayako's child by "entering" her womb, while she was frustrated by her inability to conceive a child with Takeo. Takeo eventually found the truth years afterward and killed his wife, igniting the curse to include Kayako as well. In the sequel, Ju-on: The Final Curse, it is revealed that Toshio is capable of controlling anyone claimed by the curse under his control, not just Kayako, as shown when he directs Yayoi to kill her sister, as well as Reo and her mother. He is also able to possess a person and leaving them at will; doing this ensures the survival of his second mortal incarnation long enough to be adopted by Reo's family, thus dooming them.

=== American timeline ===
Similar to the original, Toshio's mother has a crush on his teacher – in this case, Peter Kirk – and this obsession leads to a misunderstanding with his father. After Takeo snaps Kayako's neck, he sees Toshio watching from the second floor. Takeo drowns Toshio, as well as his cat Mar, in the bathtub.

His maternal grandmother is Nakagawa Kawamata, his aunt is Kayako's younger sister, Naoko, and his uncle by marriage is Daisuke.

== Differences between versions ==
- In the American remake, Takeo kills Toshio by drowning him in the bathtub. Unlike in the Japanese original, where Takeo kills the cat with a utility knife, in the American remake he also drowns him in the bathtub. He puts Toshio's body in the closet and seals it with duct tape.
- In the Ju-on novel, Toshio hides in the attic from his father. Instead of coming after him, Takeo slams the cupboard door shut, leaving Toshio to starve to death. However, while in the attic, Toshio encounters the body (and the ghost) of his mother, so it is unknown if he did indeed starve, or if Kayako claimed him. Also in the novel, Toshio buries his own cat in the dirt, after both of their deaths.
- In the Ju-on films, Toshio is six years old at the time of his death. In the Grudge films, he was either seven or eight years old (the online newspaper article that Karen reads states Toshio's age as seven, but a link to another online article on the search engine she uses states Toshio's age as eight).
- In the Ju-on films, Takeo killed Toshio because he wrongly suspected that he was not his son, and was instead the product of an affair between Kayako and Kobayashi. The Ju-on novelization expands on this, by detailing that Takeo and Kayako were unable to get pregnant again no matter what they tried, and at his doctor's appointment he was informed that he had a low sperm count, fueling his suspicion that Toshio wasn't his son. In the American films, Takeo had to kill Toshio because he walked in on him killing Kayako. It's unlikely that he suspected that Toshio wasn't his son in the American films, as Peter Kirk, Kobayashi's American counterpart, is a white man.
- In the Ju-on: The Beginning of the End reboot, there are two Toshio identified: Toshio Yamaga, who resided in the house nineteen years before the main timeline, and Toshio Saeki, who was reborn in Kayako's womb ten years before the main timeline. Toshio is also older than the previous continuities, being at least 9 years old at his death. While the backstory is completely changed as mentioned above, Toshio's pet cat, Mar, is still retained.

== See also ==
- Onryō
- Yūrei
