= The Grudge (film series) =

American supernatural horror film series

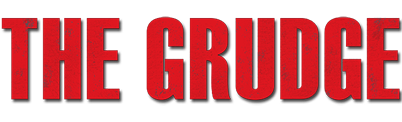
- Official logo
- Directed by: Takashi Shimizu (1–2); Toby Wilkins (3); Nicolas Pesce (4)
- Written by: Stephen Susco (1-2); Brad Keene (3); Nicolas Pesce (4); Jeff Buhler (4)
- Produced by: Sam Raimi (1–2, 4); Rob Tapert (1–2, 4); Taka Ichise (1–4); Andrew Pfeffer (3)
- Starring: See cast
- Cinematography: Hideo Yamamoto (1); Katsumi Yanagishima (2); Anton Bakarski (3); Zack Galler (4)
- Edited by: Jeff Betancourt (1–2); John Quinn (3); Gardner Gould (4); Ken Blackwell (4)
- Music by: Christopher Young (1–2); Sean McMahon (3); The Newton Brothers (4)
- Production companies: Columbia Pictures (1–2); Ghost House Pictures (1–4); Stage 6 Films (3–4); Screen Gems (4)
- Distributed by: Sony Pictures Releasing (1–2, 4); Sony Pictures Home Entertainment (3)
- Release dates: October 22, 2004 (The Grudge); October 13, 2006 (The Grudge 2); May 12, 2009 (The Grudge 3); January 3, 2020 (The Grudge)
- Running time: Total (4 films): 376 minutes
- Box office: Total (4 films): $309.3 million

The Grudge is an American supernatural horror film series released by Sony Pictures based on and a part of the larger Japanese Ju-On franchise. The first installment is a remake of Ju-On: The Grudge and follows a similar storyline to the Japanese film. The sequel, The Grudge 2, is not a remake and follows a unique storyline, albeit still borrowing some plot elements from several Japanese predecessors. Another sequel, The Grudge 3, picks up shortly after the events of the second film.

The series focuses on those affected by a curse created in a house in Suginami by a deceased family's rage that destroys the lives of everyone who comes in contact with it. Known as the ju-on, this curse causes its victims to become fatally afflicted with it, which in turn leads to a new curse being born and passed like a virus to all those who enter the family residence or come into contact with the curse in any way.

A new film was released in 2020; while initially conceived of as a reboot, the film wound up being another (stand-alone) sequel. Sam Raimi and Robert Tapert served as producers for the first, second, and fourth films through their Ghost House Pictures production company, with Takashige Ichise also serving as a producer on all four films.

== Films ==
Film	Director	Screenwriter(s)	Producer(s)
The Grudge (2004)	Takashi Shimizu	Stephen Susco	Sam Raimi, Robert Tapert and Takashige Ichise
The Grudge 2 (2006)	Takashi Shimizu	Stephen Susco	Sam Raimi, Robert Tapert and Takashige Ichise
The Grudge 3 (2009)	Toby Wilkins	Brad Keene	Andrew Pfeffer and Takashige Ichise
The Grudge (2019)	Nicolas Pesce	Jeff Buhler & Nicolas Pesce	Sam Raimi, Robert Tapert and Takashige Ichise

=== The Grudge (2004) ===
The Grudge premiered on October 22, 2004. The story follows Karen (Sarah Michelle Gellar), an exchange student studying social work, living with her boyfriend Doug (Jason Behr) in Japan, who innocently agrees to cover for Yoko (Yōko Maki), a nurse who didn't show up for work. When she enters the assigned home, she discovers an elderly American woman, Emma (Grace Zabriskie), who is lost in a catatonic state while the rest of the house appears deserted and disheveled. As she is tending to the stricken old woman, Karen hears scratching sounds from upstairs. When she investigates, she is faced with a supernatural occurrences and encounters spirits of the deceased Saeki family members. Within this house, a chain of terror has been set in motion resulting from tragic murders that occurred years before. As more people die, Karen is pulled into the cycle of horror and learns the secret of the vengeful curse that has taken root in this house while simultaneously trying to keep her boyfriend from getting involved.

The film was a major box office success, grossing over $180 million at the box office, far exceeding the expectations of box office analysts and Sony Pictures executives.

=== The Grudge 2 (2006) ===
The second installment was released on October 13, 2006, and is set within two years after the first film, and between two countries. It follows Aubrey Davis (Amber Tamblyn), Karen's younger sister who, after receiving a phone call from her mother (Joanna Cassidy) regarding Karen's confinement in a mental hospital after the events of the previous film, travels to Tokyo, Japan to meet her. When she witnesses Karen dying horrifically, she sets out to find the source of the curse along with a journalist named Eason (Edison Chen).

An American teenager studying in a Japanese International School named Allison Fleming (Arielle Kebbel) also has to deal with a terrifying supernatural event inflicted by a prank by her classmates. Meanwhile, in Chicago, Jake Kimble (Matthew Knight) is also caught up in the curse that seems to have spread to his apartment after Allison Fleming moves back there with her family.

Like its predecessor, the film was a box office success, earning $70 million worldwide.

=== The Grudge 3 (2009) ===
In Chicago, Jake Kimble, the sole survivor of The Grudge 2, is interned in a mental institution and his therapist Dr. Sullivan (Shawnee Smith) does not believe that he is haunted by the malevolent ghosts of Kayako and Toshio. When Jake is killed in his cell with nearly all his bones broken, Dr. Sullivan decides to investigate further with an open mind. Meanwhile, Lisa (Johanna Braddy), the sister of the building's superintendent, Max (Gil McKinney), steals the key of apartment 305 to have sex with her boyfriend Andy (Beau Mirchoff). When she realizes that the apartment is a crime scene, she immediately returns to her apartment, where she resides with Max and their ill sister Rose (Jadie Rose Hobson). In the meantime, Naoko Kawamata (Emi Ikehata) travels from Tokyo to Chicago to stop the curse of her sister Kayako. She meets Lisa and tells her that she needs hers and Rose's help to stop the fiend of her sister, but Lisa refuses to participate. When Max is possessed by the evil spirit of Takeo, Lisa decides to reconsider Naoko's offer.

Unlike the first two films, The Grudge 3 did not receive a worldwide theatrical release. Instead, the film was released on straight-to-video.

=== The Grudge (2019) ===
A sequel was announced in August 2011, with a release set for 2013/14. The film was speculated to be a reboot of the series, rather than a direct sequel, introducing a new storyline. In 2014, it was announced that a reboot was in the works, with Jeff Buhler set to write the screenplay. Buhler stated in an interview that the upcoming film would have "all new characters and new ghosts". It was also reported that the character of Kayako Saeki, who had been a central character of the previous three installments, would be absent from the new film. In July 2017, it was announced that Nicolas Pesce was set to rewrite, based on Buhler's script, and direct. Pesce stated that the film would be: "[much] darker, grittier, and more realistic." In March 2018, it was announced that Andrea Riseborough, Demián Bichir, John Cho, and Lin Shaye were in the cast, and that filming was set to start in May 2018. The film ended up being a sidequel that takes place before and during the events of the 2004 film and its two direct sequels. It was released on December 31, 2019, in Indonesia and on January 3, 2020, in the United States by Sony Pictures Entertainment.

=== Future ===
In September 2019, The Grudge (2019) director Nicolas Pesce expressed interest in a crossover film between The Grudge and The Ring American film series. In January 2020, Pesce expressed further interest in a sequel being set in both a different part of the world than America or Japan, and in a different "less contemporary" time period compared to previous films.

== Main characters ==
=== Karen Davis ===
Karen Davis (portrayed by Sarah Michelle Gellar) is the main protagonist of The Grudge (2004). Karen originally traveled to Tokyo, Japan with her boyfriend Doug as a foreign exchange student. During her studies in Tokyo, Karen decides to volunteer as a house maid for a social worker program. She soon finds out about the Saeki curse, and tries to stop it before she and Doug are claimed by it. While trying to keep her boyfriend Doug from falling to the curse she burns the house down, unintentionally releasing the curse instead. In The Grudge 2, Karen is placed in a Japanese hospital. She is strapped to a bed and constantly guarded by the police. She is still haunted by Kayako, causing her to panic and free herself. She successfully evades the police while being chased by the ghost. When she reaches the roof of the hospital, she backs away to the edge of the roof and Kayako either pushes her off or she commits suicide (the latter is more likely due to Karen not screaming while falling to her death).

Gellar received praise for her performance in the first film. Where many critics referenced her performances as the reason for the film's success.

=== Aubrey Davis ===
Aubrey Davis (portrayed by Amber Tamblyn) is Karen's younger sister and the protagonist of The Grudge 2. She lives in Pasadena, California and is one day called to her mother's house. Mrs. Davis tells Aubrey what has happened to Karen and Doug before announcing to her that Aubrey will be flying to Tokyo to bring Karen back. Instead, she feels compelled to investigate Karen's death (after Karen jumps off a building, or gets "dragged off" by Kayako). Aubrey tries to stop the curse and, during her visit to the Saeki House, she mysteriously gets warped through time to the night of the first murders. There, she is violently killed by Takeo Saeki in exactly the same manner as his wife, Kayako, was.

She turned into an Onryō due to dying in extreme sorrow and pain. From that point on, she replaces Kayako until Allison comes face to face with her. Whether she still resides in the house as Kayako's replacement is unknown.

=== Lisa ===
Lisa (portrayed by Johanna Braddy) is the main character of The Grudge 3. She is a resident of the building and appeared to be living in the apartment for some time, knowing most of the residents such as Jake and Allison Fleming (albeit rarely meeting the latter). At the time of the events of The Grudge 3, she had been intending to leave Chicago for New York with her boyfriend to work as a fashion model so she can win the scholarship money to pay for her sister's Rose's medical bills. She becomes rather uncomfortable with the fact that Rose is saying that a new boy had moved into the building despite not hearing about it before. She later finds out the 'new boy' is in fact Toshio Saeki after running into him at the same floor Jake's apartment is. After Kayako's younger sister Naoko moves into the building and tries to convince Lisa and her sister to participate in an exorcism to rid the building of the evil spirits, Lisa refuses to participate but soon after finding out her brother had been possessed she changes her mind. After her brother kills Naoko during the exorcism, Lisa gets cornered by Kayako. To save her sisters life, Rose finishes the exorcism ritual herself by drinking Kayako's blood and causes Kayako to disappear. Shortly afterwards, her brother is killed by Naoko's spirit.

Lisa is one of the two survivors from the apartment massacre though she does not know that Rose's body now houses Kayako's spirit. It is unknown what happens to Lisa and Rose after this, and if the spirit of the deceased Naoko comes for them.

=== Detective Muldoon ===
Detective Muldoon (portrayed by Andrea Riseborough) is main character of The Grudge (2019). She is a rookie detective who moves to town alongside her young son Burke after her husband's death of cancer. Investigating the deaths of Lorna Moody and William Matheson, Muldoon becomes cursed and is promptly tormented by the ghosts of the Landers family. Terrified the curse may harm Burke, Muldoon consults her partner Detective Goodman, who reveals to her Fiona Landers had brought the curse abroad from Japan.

Hoping to end the curse, Muldoon burns down the Landers home. Believing she had ended the curse, Muldoon hugs Burke before he goes to school only to see another Burke leaving the house; she finds that the Burke she is Melinda, and is dragged away to her doom by Fiona's ghost.

== Cast and crew ==
=== Principal cast ===
Key
- A ^{Y} indicates the actor portrayed the role of a younger version of the character.
- An ^{O} indicates a role as an older version of the character.
- A ^{V} indicates the actor or actress lent only his or her voice for his or her film character.
- An ^{A} indicates an appearance through archival footage or stills.
- A dark gray cell indicates the character was not in the film.

Characters	Films				Animated	Short series
Characters	The Grudge	The Grudge 2	The Grudge 3	The Grudge	The Grudge 1.5	Tales from the Grudge
Characters	2004	2006	2009	2019	2006	2006
Kayako Saeki (née Kawamata)	Takako Fuji	Takako Fuji Kyoka Takizawa^{Y}	Aiko Horiuchi Takako Fuji^{A} Kyoka Takizawa^{YA}	Junko Bailey Takako Fuji^{A}	Voice Actress is Uncredited	Anna Moon
Toshio Saeki	Yuya Ozeki	Yuya Ozeki^{A}	Yuya Ozeki^{A}	Actor is Uncredited Yuya Ozeki^{A}	Silent	
Toshio Saeki	Yuya Ozeki	Ohga Tanaka	Shimba Tsuchiya	Actor is Uncredited Yuya Ozeki^{A}	Silent	
Takeo Saeki	Takashi Matsuyama	Takashi Matsuyama	Takashi Matsuyama^{A}	Takashi Matsuyama^{A}		
Karen Davis	Sarah Michelle Gellar	Sarah Michelle Gellar	Sarah Michelle Gellar^{A}		Voice Actress is Uncredited	
Detective Nakagawa	Ryo Ishibashi	Ryo Ishibashi	Ryo Ishibashi^{A}			
Yoko	Yōko Maki	Yōko Maki^{A}		Voice Actress is Uncredited		
Doug	Jason Behr	Jason Behr^{A}				
Emma Williams	Grace Zabriskie			Mentioned	Grace Zabrisakie^{A}	
Fiona Landers	Actor is Uncredited			Tara Westwood		
Matthew "Matt" Williams	William Mapother				William Mapother^{A}	
Jennifer "Jen" Williams	Clea DuVall			Mentioned	Clea DuVall^{A}	
Susan Williams	KaDee Strickland					
Alex	Ted Raimi				Ted Raimi^{A}	
Peter Kirk	Bill Pullman					
Maria Kirk	Rosa Blasi					
Igarashi	Hiroshi Matsunaga					
Suzuki	Hajime Okayama					
Jake Kimble		Matthew Knight	Matthew Knight			
Nakagawa Kawamata		Kim Miyori	Kim Miyori^{A}			
Eason		Edison Chen			Edison Chen^{V}	
Aubrey Davis		Amber Tamblyn				
Allison Fleming		Arielle Kebbel	Arielle Kebbel^{M}			
Lisa			Johanna Braddy			
Max			Gil McKinney			
Rose			Jadie Rose Hobson			
Mr. Fleming		Paul Jarret	Paul Jarret^{M}			
Mrs. Fleming		Gwen Lorenzetti	Gwen Lorenzetti^{M}			
Mrs. Davis		Joanna Cassidy				
Michael		Shaun Sipos				
Mishima Folkfore Guy		Zen Kajihara				
Vanessa Cassidy		Teresa Palmer				
Miyuki Nazawa		Misako Uno				
Lacey Kimble		Sarah Roemer	Sarah Roemer^{M}			
Bill Kimble		Christopher Cousins	Christopher Cousins^{M}			
Ms. Dale		Eve Gordon	Eve Gordon^{M}			
Trish Kimble		Jennifer Beals	Jennifer Beals^{M}			
Sally		Jenna Dewan				
Dr. Sullivan			Shawnee Smith			
Andy			Beau Mirchoff			
Gretchen			Marina Sirtis			
Naoko Kawamata		Emi Ikehata^{M}	Emi Ikehata			
Mr. Praski			Michael McCoy			
Daisuke			Takatsuma Mukai			
Renee			Laura Giosh			
Brenda			Mihaela Nankova			
Detective Muldoon				Andrea Riseborough		
Detective Goodman				Demián Bichir		
Peter Spencer				John Cho		
Nina Spencer				Betty Gilpin		
Faith Matheson				Lin Shaye		
Lorna Moody				Jacki Weaver		
Detective Wilson				William Sadler		
William Matheson				Frankie Faison		
Abby						Stefanie Butler
Ross						Daniel Sykes
Brooke						Ginny Weirick
Josh						Alexander Morse
Woman on Bench						Jenna Morganelli

=== Additional crew ===
Crew/detail	Films			
Crew/detail	The Grudge	The Grudge 2	The Grudge 3	The Grudge
Crew/detail	2004	2006	2009	2019
Director	Takashi Shimizu	Takashi Shimizu	Toby Wilkins	Nicolas Pesce
Producer	Sam Raimi; Robert Tapert; Takashige Ichise	Sam Raimi; Robert Tapert; Takashige Ichise	Andrew Pfeiffer; Takashige Ichise	Sam Raimi; Robert Tapert; Takashige Ichise
Writer(s)	Screenplay by Stephen Susco; Based on Ju-on: The Grudge by Takashi Shimizu	Stephen Susco	Brad Keene	Screenplay by Nicolas Pesce; Story by Nicolas Pesce; Jeff Buhler
Composer	Christopher Young	Christopher Young	Sean Mchahon	The Newton Brothers
Cinematography	Hideo Yamamoto	Katsumi Yanagishima	Anton Bakarski	Zack Galler
Editor	Jeff Betancourt	Jeff Betancourt	John Quinn	Ken Blackwell; Gardner Gould
Production company	Ghost House Pictures	Ghost House Pictures	Ghost House Pictures; Stage 6 Films	Ghost House Pictures; Screen Gems; Stage 6 Films
Distributor	Columbia Pictures	Columbia Pictures	Sony Pictures Home Entertainment	Sony Pictures Entertainment
Release date	October 22, 2004	October 13, 2006	May 12, 2009	January 3, 2020
Running time	92 minutes	102 minutes	90 minutes	94 minutes

== Reception ==
=== Box office ===
The Grudge was a box office success. The film opened in North America on October 22, 2004, and generated $39.1 million in ticket sales in its first weekend of release. During the film's second week, it declined 43% with $21.8 million, becoming the first horror film to top the Halloween box office since House on Haunted Hill (1999). It made a total of US$110,359,362 in North America alone and $187,281,115 worldwide, far exceeding the expectations of box office analysts and Sony Pictures executives, who anticipated just $20 million. The company stated that the film cost less than $10 million to produce, thereby making it one of the most profitable films of the year.

A sequel was announced the Monday after The Grudge opened in North America. Later titled, The Grudge 2, the film opened on October 13, 2006, in North America, to capitalize on Friday the 13th. The marketing worked, and the filmed grossed $10 million on its opening day. The Grudge 2 topped the North American box office with $20.8 million overall, during its opening weekend. This was well below what most analysts had expected, and more than 44% less than the opening of the previous film. However, despite failing to reach expectations, it was enough to cover its $20 million production budget. In total, the film had grossed $39 million in North America, the equivalent to what the first film opened with. Worldwide the film grossed $70,711,175.

=== Box office performance ===
Film	U.S. release date	Box office gross			Budget	Reference
Film	U.S. release date	North America	Other territories	Worldwide	Budget	Reference
The Grudge (2004)	October 22, 2004	$110,359,362	$76,921,753	$187,281,115	$10 million	
The Grudge 2	October 13, 2006	$39,143,839	$31,567,336	$70,711,175	$20 million	
The Grudge 3	May 12, 2009	—N/a	$1,869,127	$1,869,127	$5 million	
The Grudge (2019)	January 3, 2020	$21,221,803	$28,289,516	$49,511,319	$10 million	
Total		$170,725,004	$138,647,732	$309,372,736	$45 million	

=== Critical response ===
Film	Rotten Tomatoes	Metacritic
The Grudge (2004)	40% (162 reviews)	49 (32 reviews)
The Grudge 2	11% (76 reviews)	33 (16 reviews)
The Grudge 3	N/A	—N/a
The Grudge (2019)	20% (123 reviews)	41 (27 reviews)

== See also ==
- Ju-On
