= The Grudge 2 =

2006 film by Takashi Shimizu

- Theatrical release poster
- Directed by: Takashi Shimizu
- Written by: Stephen Susco
- Based on: Ju-on: The Grudge by Takashi Shimizu
- Produced by: Sam Raimi; Rob Tapert; Taka Ichise
- Starring: Amber Tamblyn; Arielle Kebbel; Jennifer Beals; Edison Chen; Sarah Roemer; Sarah Michelle Gellar
- Cinematography: Katsumi Yanagishima
- Edited by: Jeff Betancourt
- Music by: Christopher Young
- Production companies: Columbia Pictures; Ghost House Pictures
- Distributed by: Sony Pictures Releasing
- Release date: October 13, 2006
- Running time: 102 minutes
- Country: United States
- Languages: English; Japanese
- Budget: $20 million
- Box office: $70.7 million

The Grudge 2 is a 2006 American supernatural horror film directed by Takashi Shimizu and written by Stephen Susco. The film is a sequel to The Grudge (2004) and the second installment in the American The Grudge film series, based on the Ju-On franchise created by Shimizu. It is the sixth and last Ju-On or The Grudge film directed by Shimizu. The film stars Arielle Kebbel, Amber Tamblyn, Jennifer Beals, Edison Chen, Sarah Roemer, and Sarah Michelle Gellar, the latter reprising her role from the first film.

Like its predecessor, the film features a plot that is told through a nonlinear sequence of events and includes several intersecting subplots. It follows Karen's younger sister Aubrey coming to Japan after finding out about Doug's death, a schoolgirl named Allison being haunted by the ghosts of the Saeki family after entering the house with two of her classmates, and a young boy named Jake whose apartment building is haunted by the ghosts.

The Grudge 2 was released in the United States on October 13, 2006, by Sony Pictures Releasing. The film received negative reviews from critics and grossed $70.7 million worldwide. A sequel, The Grudge 3, was released direct-to-video in May 2009, and a sidequel, The Grudge, was theatrically released in December 2019.

== Plot ==
The Grudge is described as a curse that is born when someone dies in the grip of extreme rage or sorrow. The curse is an entity created when the person dies. Those who encounter this supernatural force die, and the curse is reborn repeatedly, passing from victim to victim in an endless, growing chain of horror. The following events are explained in their actual order; however, the film is presented in a nonlinear narrative.

In 2004, American social worker Karen Davis tried to burn down the Saeki house to stop the curse but failed, finding herself hospitalized and haunted by Kayako. Karen's younger sister, Aubrey, goes to Tokyo to retrieve her. In Japan, Aubrey struggles to communicate with the hospital staff, but a journalist named Eason aids her. Aubrey briefly speaks with Karen, who panics and has to be restrained. Karen later falls to her death courtesy of Kayako in front of Aubrey and Eason. Eason explains the curse to Aubrey, revealing that he rescued Karen from the house fire and has been investigating the Saeki murders and surrounding events.

The two go to the house to retrieve Kayako's diary. Aubrey intends to wait outside, but Toshio drags her inside to curse her. Eason takes the diary to an associate, who explains that Kayako's mother, Nakagawa Kawamata, was an itako who exorcised evil spirits from visitors and fed them to her daughter. Eason and Aubrey make plans to visit Kawamata. As Eason develops photographs he took of the Saeki house, Kayako emerges from a photo and murders him. After discovering his body, Aubrey travels alone to Kawamata's remote rural home. Kawamata skeptically warns her that the curse is irreversible, before being killed by her daughter. Aubrey ventures back to the Saeki house, following an image of Karen inside. She encounters Takeo's ghost, who reenacts the night he discovers his wife's disloyalty and snaps Aubrey's neck.

In 2006, school girls Allison Fleming, Vanessa Cassidy, and Miyuki Nazawa break into the house on a dare. Allison is locked in the closet and encounters a ghost resembling Kayako (revealed to be Aubrey at the end of the film), but the girls escape. After Miyuki and Vanessa are consumed by the curse, Allison speaks with school counsellor Ms. Dale about the curse, but Dale denies its existence, revealing that she went to the house and is actually a ghost herself. Allison is haunted by the ghosts of her friends, and she eventually flees back to Chicago, where she stays with her parents.

The Kimbles move into an apartment block in Chicago. A young boy named Jake is disturbed by a strange presence in the building, brought about by a hooded stranger who covers windows with newspapers. Jake's father Bill and stepmother Trish are possessed by Takeo's and Kayako's spirits respectively, with Bill suspecting Trish of having an affair, prompting her to kill him with a frying pan. Jake and his sister, Lacey, return from school, but Jake finds that his family is all dead. He runs into the hooded person, revealed to be Allison, who explains that the curse followed her. Kayako appears inside Allison's hood, finally taking her, and then emerges to assault Jake.

== Cast ==
- Sarah Michelle Gellar as Karen Davis, the sole survivor from the first film
- Amber Tamblyn as Aubrey Davis, Karen's younger sister
- Arielle Kebbel as Allison Fleming, an exchange student from Chicago who attended Tokyo International School in Tokyo
- Takako Fuji as Kayako Saeki, wife of Takeo Saeki, mother of Toshio Saeki
- Edison Chen as Eason, a journalist who is investigating the Saeki murders
- Sarah Roemer as Lacey, a cheerleader and Jake's older sister
- Matthew Knight as Jake, a young boy who suspects something happening in their apartment
- Misako Uno as Miyuki, Vanessa's friend
- Teresa Palmer as Vanessa, a popular schoolgirl
- Ohga Tanaka and Yuya Ozeki (archive footage) as Toshio Saeki, Kayako and Takeo's 7-year-old son
- Jennifer Beals as Trish, Bill's wife
- Christopher Cousins as Bill, Jake and Lacey's father
- Joanna Cassidy as Mrs. Davis, Karen and Aubrey's ill mother who lives in Pasadena, California
- Eve Gordon as the school's counselor
- Jenna Dewan as Sally, Lacey's neighbor and friend
- Ryo Ishibashi as Detective Nakagawa
- Shaun Sipos as Michael, Miyuki's boyfriend
- Jason Behr as Doug, Karen's boyfriend
- Kim Miyori as Kayako's mother
- Takashi Matsuyama as Takeo Saeki, Kayako's husband

== Production ==
Principal photography took place at Toho Studios in Tokyo, Japan and production wrapped up on April 25, 2006. During an interview on Dread Central with Amber Tamblyn, it was reported that sets were created in Chicago for Tamblyn to re-shoot several scenes.

Takashi Shimizu said in an interview with Sci Fi Wire, "For The Grudge 2, I was going for this mystery that was never there in The Grudge and I think that's going to fulfill the audience. ... There's a secret about Kayako's childhood life, so that's part of the big mystery. And the other mystery is this grudge will never stop and it's going to ... spread. And how is it going to get spread? That's another mystery." He also clarified that "The Grudge was a complete remake of Ju-on, meaning the storyline was very similar. Basically, it's the same. But Grudge 2 is actually different from Ju-on: The Grudge 2 and I don't think I would have accepted this job if it was going to be the same storyline. And because it was a different story, you know, my motivation was a bit higher and I actually enjoy doing this."

== Release ==
=== Theatrical ===
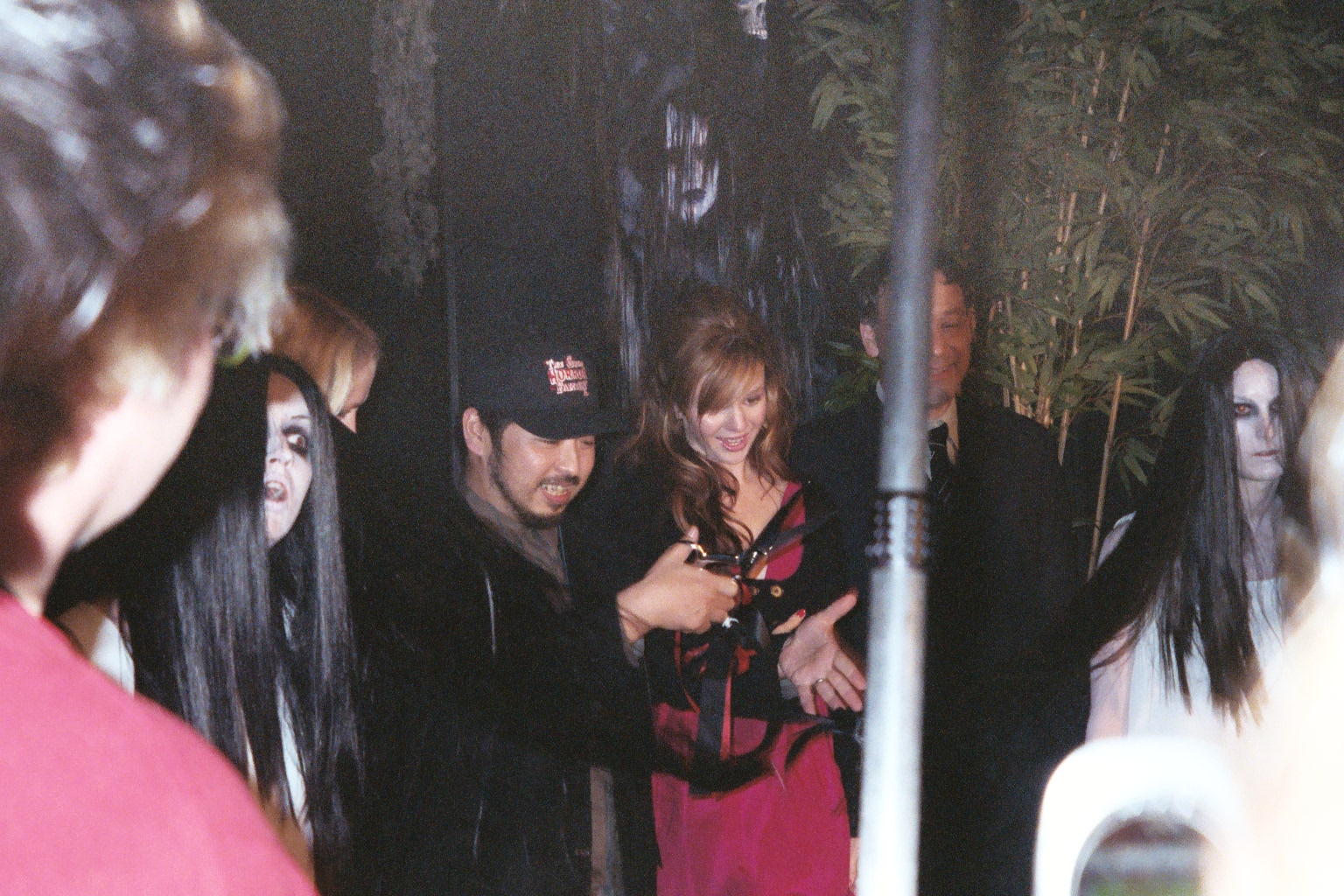
Shimizu and Tamblyn cutting the ribbon at the premiere of The Grudge 2.

The Grudge 2 premiered at Knott's Berry Farm in Buena Park, California on October 8, 2006. During the premiere, the theme park was open to the public and featured a The Grudge 2 maze as part of its 2006 Halloween Haunt.

=== Marketing ===
Sony employed various methods to promote The Grudge 2. On April 1, 2006, a teaser site was launched with details revealing the October 13 release date. On September 19, 2006, Yahoo! Movies was the first site to release three short films titled Tales from the Grudge with an introduction from one of the producers of The Grudge, Sam Raimi. The series of shorts expands on the story of the Saeki curse. The shorts were directed by Toby Wilkins (director of The Grudge 3) and written by Ben Ketai.

=== Home media ===
The Grudge 2 was released on DVD and UMD video for the PlayStation Portable on February 6, 2007. A Blu-ray version of the film has yet to be released in the United States. The film debuted on Blu-ray for the first time in France on March 2, 2010, in a standalone release and trilogy set with the first and third film. Though containing the Director's Cut it is Region Locked. The film was released in the Netherlands on March 14, 2013, in a standalone release and as a double feature with the first film. This version is Region Free and contains the Director's Cut but none of the special features. The film debuted on Blu-ray in the United Kingdom on November 2, 2020. This version only contains the theatrical cut and is Region Locked. It grossed $8.5 million in home sales. The film then debuted in a double feature (and later a standalone) release with the first film in Germany on November 19, 2021. This disc, though Region Free, only contains the theatrical cut.

== Reception ==
=== Box office ===
The Grudge 2 opened in 3,211 theaters and was projected to generate $27 million across the October 13–15 weekend but generated $10,018,039 on its opening day and $20.8 million on its opening weekend. It placed number one at the box office, beating out The Departed. The film grossed $39.1 million in the United States and Canada, with $31.6 million in other territories, for a worldwide gross of $70.7 million.

=== Critical response ===
The Grudge 2 was not screened in advance for critics. On the review aggregator website Rotten Tomatoes, 12% of 77 critics' reviews are positive, with an average rating of 3.6/10. The website's consensus reads: "A diminished sequel that makes even less sense than The Grudge 1" Metacritic, which uses a weighted average, assigned the film a score of 33 out of 100, based on 16 critics, indicating "generally unfavorable" reviews.

The film was criticized by several critics for its confusing plot. Keith Phipps from The A.V. Club wrote, "While The Grudge 2 deserves some credit for creating and sustaining a creepy atmosphere, it doesn't matter much when the plot doesn't go anywhere." Pete Vonder Haar from Film Threat found "[t]he same problems that plagued the original are on display here. Most notably, the lack of any coherent plot." Paul Debrudge from Variety stated, "The story is incidental, as auds merely anticipate the scares." Tim Goernert from JoBlo.com "found it really hard to follow the story as well, as there were three of them happening at the same time."

== Sequels ==
A sequel, The Grudge 3, directed by Toby Wilkins and set immediately after the events of The Grudge 2, was released on May 12, 2009, starring Aiko Horiuchi as Kayako Saeki and Shimba Tsuchiya as Toshio Saeki, and featuring Matthew Knight reprising his role as Jake Kimble in a cameo appearance.

A sidequel, The Grudge, directed by Nicolas Pesce and set during and after the events of the first three The Grudge films, was released on December 31, 2019, featuring the characters of Kayako and Toshio in cameo appearances.

== See also ==
- List of ghost films
