= Ju-On: White Ghost =

2009 Japanese horror film

- Directed by: Ryuta Miyake
- Written by: Ryuta Miyake
- Produced by: Ryuta Miyake
- Starring: Akina Minami; Hiroki Suzuki; Mihiro; Aimi Nakamura; Marika Fukunaga; Chie Amemiya
- Production companies: Toei Video; Cell; Oz Co.
- Distributed by: Toei Video
- Release date: June 27, 2009
- Running time: 61 Minutes
- Country: Japan
- Language: Japanese
- Box office: $2 million

Ju-On: White Ghost (呪怨: 白い老女, Juon: Shiroi Rōjo; lit. "Ju-On: White Old Lady") is a 2009 Japanese supernatural horror film produced in honor of the tenth anniversary of the Ju-on series. Like most films in the franchise, White Ghost is told in a non-linear order, with each vignette titled after a character central to the story. The Saeki murders, central to previous Ju-on films, are absent from the sequel, with Toshio Saeki making a brief cameo being the only exception.

== Plot ==
White Ghost is divided into eight segments in the following order: Fumiya (文哉), Kashiwagi (柏木), Akane (あかね), Isobe (磯部), Chiho (千穂), Mirai (未来), Yasukawa (安川), and Atsushi (篤).

The Isobe family, including daughter Mirai and her uncle Atsushi, have recently moved to a new house, where the murder of Mariko's family from Ju-On: Black Ghost took place. Possessed by a spirit from a mirror, which has assumed his appearance, Atsushi distances himself from the others and starts to sexually abuse Mirai. After failing his bar exam two days before Christmas, Atsushi listens to a cassette that mysteriously records his voice saying "I'll be right there" to a young girl.

Atsushi then murders his family; first, he bludgeons his father Kentaro with a bat. Then, he strangles his grandmother Haru, who has an abnormal obsession with Atsushi's basketball. Afterwards, he stabs his stepmother Maho and burns his stepsister Junko alive. Finally, he decapitates Mirai and keeps her head in a bag. Atsushi carries the bag and takes a taxi ride, driven by Hajime Kashiwagi, to a forest. At the forest, Atsushi expresses remorse and records himself saying "I'll be right there" to Mirai's head, which has come alive, on a cassette. He then hangs himself.

Hajime is requested by his management to answer questions to the police, who are investigating the Isobe massacre. Hajime agrees but he finds Mirai's head in his backseat and is viciously dragged away by an unseen entity from behind. On Christmas, Fumiya, a delivery boy, delivers a pre-ordered Christmas cake to the Isobe household. However, he is tormented by the Isobe ghosts. Haru's ghost is also implied to be possessed by the ghost of Kayako Saeki. Fumiya is then comforted by his girlfriend, Chiho, who celebrates Christmas in their apartment. However, Fumiya sees Chiho as Haru's ghost and kills her by stabbing her repeatedly. Meanwhile, Atsushi's cassette becomes cursed and kills anyone who listens to it but Detective Yasukawa eventually buries it near a mountain.

Seven years later, Hajime's daughter and Mirai's friend, Akane, now sixteen years old, is playing Kokkuri with her friends Mayumi and Yuka. Mayumi suggests calling the spirit of Akane's father. When they play, the board spells "Mirai", and after seeing Mirai's ghost, Akane quickly leaves, leaving her friends puzzled. While Mayumi goes back to the class to grab her things, Yuka goes to the restroom and encounters Haru's ghost, who kills her off-screen. Atsushi's cassette mysteriously appears in Yasukawa's office and despite Yasukawa destroying it, it plays by itself to his colleague.

After returning home one night, Akane sees Mirai's ghost and apologizes to her for not helping her when she was abused. Akane closes her eyes and accepts her fate. However, she finds a bear key-chain near her feet, which Mirai gave to her for good luck as a child.

== Cast ==
- Akina Minami as Akane Kashiwagi (柏木 あかね, Kashiwagi Akane)
  - Natsuki Kasa as Young Akane
- Hiroki Suzuki as Fumiya Hagimoto (萩本 文哉, Hagimoto Fumiya)
- Mihiro as Chiho Tanemura (種村 千穂, Tanemura Chiho)
- Aimi Nakamura as Junko Isobe (磯部 淳子, Isobe Junko)
- Marika Fukunaga as Yuka Kanehara (金原 由佳, Kanehara Yuka)
- Chie Amemiya as Mayumi Yoshikawa (吉川 真弓, Yoshikawa Mayumi)
- Akiko Hoshino as Haru Isobe (磯部 ハル, Isobe Haru)
- Takuji Suzuki as Hideki Yasukawa (安川 英樹, Yasukawa Hideki)
- Tsuyoshi Muro as Atsushi Isobe (磯部 篤, Isobe Atsushi)
- Ichirōta Miyakawa as Hajime Kashiwagi (柏木 一, Kashiwagi Hajime)
- Chinami Iwamoto as Mirai Isobe (磯部 未来, Isobe Mirai)
- Eiichi Okubo as Kentaro Isobe (磯部 健太郎, Isobe Kentaro)
- Shūsei Uto as Toshio Saeki

== Release ==
The film was released alongside its co-installment Black Ghost on DVD in the UK on April 26, 2010, and was released onto DVD and Blu-ray in the US on May 17, 2011.
