= Ju-On: Black Ghost =

2009 Japanese horror film

- Film poster
- Directed by: Mari Asato
- Written by: Mari Asato
- Produced by: Mari Asato
- Starring: Maria Takagi; Hana Matsumoto; Yuno Nakazono; Kana Tsugihara; Kuniteru Shigeyama; Ryota Matsushima; Masanobu Katsumura
- Production companies: Toei Video; Cell; Oz Co.
- Distributed by: Toei Video
- Release date: 27 June 2009 (Japan)
- Running time: 60 minutes
- Country: Japan
- Language: Japanese

Ju-On: Black Ghost (Japanese: 呪怨: 黒い少女, Hepburn: Juon: Kuroi Shōjo; lit. "Ju-On: Black Young Girl") is a 2009 Japanese supernatural horror film produced in honor of the tenth anniversary of the Ju-On series. Like most films in the franchise, Black Ghost is told in a non-linear order, with each vignette titled after a character central to the story. The sequel revolves around a hospitalized young girl who discovers that a cyst is found in her body, which is actually the physical remnant of her unborn twin.

== Plot ==
Black Ghost is divided into seven segments in the following order: Tetsuya (徹也), Yuko (裕子), Ayano (綾乃), Fukie (芙季絵), Yokota (横田), Mariko (真理子), and Kiwako (季和子).

After collapsing at school, a young girl, Fukie Yokota, is rushed to the clinic. She and her mother, Kiwako, go back home after she recovers, but Fukie suddenly lets out strange meowing and croaking noises and mutters to her father that he will kill "that woman". During a psychology test where Fukie is hypnotized, she becomes even more unstable, having to stay at the hospital and be cared for by a nurse, Yuko.

The doctor tells Kiwako that a cyst has been discovered in Fukie's body, but it is actually the physical remnant of Fukie's unborn twin who merged with her body during birth. The twin is also implied to be possessed by Kayako Saeki based on the death rattle-like noises it emits. Knowing that Fukie's condition is supernatural, Kiwako contacts her sister, Mariko, who is spiritually aware, to examine Fukie. Concluding that Fukie's twin is a parasite, she performs an exorcism to expel the evil spirit, but the spirit tricks Mariko into expelling Fukie's spirit instead. The spirit of Fukie's evil twin stabs Mariko and her family to death.

Fukie's body, which still contains the evil spirit, is taken back to the hospital and in a last-ditch effort, Kiwako takes Fukie's body and jumps off the rooftop with it, killing them both. However, this act sets the spirit free to terrorize an employee of Kiwako's husband, Ayano, as well as forcing Kiwako's husband to murder her, fulfilling the spirit's prediction. The spirit also goes to Yuko's apartment to kill her and her young neighbor, Tetsuya.

== Cast ==
- Ai Kago as Yuko (裕子, Yūko)
- Kōji Seto as Tetsuya (徹也)
- Yuri Nakamura as Mariko (真理子)
- Maria Takagi as Kiwako (季和子)
- Hana Matsumoto as Fukie (芙季絵)
- Yuno Nakazono as Ayano (綾乃)
- Kana Tsugihara as Mutsumi (むつみ)
- Kuniteru Shigeyama as Ryuta (竜太, Ryūta)
- Ryōta Matsushima as Yoshio (義雄)
- Masanobu Katsumura as Yokota (横田)
- Shūsei Uto as Toshio Saeki

== Release ==
The film was released alongside its co-installment White Ghost on DVD in the UK on 26 April 2010, and was released onto DVD and Blu-ray in the US on 17 May 2011.
