= The Grudge (2019 film) =

American film by Nicolas Pesce

- Theatrical release poster
- Directed by: Nicolas Pesce
- Screenplay by: Nicolas Pesce
- Story by: Nicolas Pesce; Jeff Buhler
- Based on: Ju-On: The Grudge by Takashi Shimizu
- Produced by: Sam Raimi; Rob Tapert; Takashige Ichise
- Starring: Andrea Riseborough; Demián Bichir; John Cho; Betty Gilpin; Lin Shaye; Jacki Weaver
- Cinematography: Zachary Galler
- Edited by: Gardner Gould; Ken Blackwell
- Music by: The Newton Brothers
- Production companies: Screen Gems; Stage 6 Films; Ghost House Pictures
- Distributed by: Sony Pictures Releasing
- Release dates: December 31, 2019 (Indonesia); January 3, 2020 (United States)
- Running time: 94 minutes
- Country: United States
- Language: English
- Budget: $12–14 million
- Box office: $49.5 million

The Grudge, titled on its home media release as The Grudge: The Untold Chapter, is a 2019 American supernatural horror film written and directed by Nicolas Pesce. A soft reboot of the American The Grudge film series, based on the 2002 Japanese horror film Ju-On: The Grudge, the film takes place before and during the events of the 2004 film and its two sequels The Grudge 2 and The Grudge 3. The film stars Andrea Riseborough, Demián Bichir, John Cho, Betty Gilpin, Lin Shaye, and Jacki Weaver, following a police officer who investigates several murders that are seemingly connected to a single house.

A fourth American The Grudge film was announced in 2011. In March 2014, it was announced a soft reboot was in the works, with Jeff Buhler set to write the script. In July 2017, filmmaker Nicolas Pesce was hired for rewrites based on Buhler's script and to direct the film. On a budget of $12–14 million, filming took place from May to June 2018.

The Grudge was released by Sony Pictures Releasing in Indonesia on December 31, 2019, followed by other international territories in the subsequent days, and in the United States on January 3, 2020. The film received negative reviews from critics and audiences alike, and grossed $49.5 million worldwide.

== Plot ==
=== 2004 ===
In 2004, live-in nurse Fiona Landers leaves the residence of the Williams family in Tokyo, (Note: As depicted in The Grudge (2004).) appearing disturbed. Fiona informs her co-worker, Yoko, that she is returning to America before briefly encountering the ghost of Kayako Saeki. Fiona arrives at her home in a small town in Pennsylvania, reuniting with her husband Sam and young daughter Melinda. Kayako's curse, however, possesses Fiona, causing her to bludgeon Sam to death and drown Melinda before killing herself by stabbing herself in the throat.

Shortly after the Landers are murdered, but before anyone discovers their deaths, real estate agents Peter and Nina Spencer learn that their unborn child will most likely be born with the rare genetic disorder ALD. Peter goes to look into selling 44 Reyburn Drive and stumbles across Melinda's ghost, presuming her to be a lost girl who is bleeding profusely from her nose. Peter, who is attacked by Fiona and Melinda's ghosts, is quickly corrupted by the curse. The possessed Peter returns to his home, where he kills Nina and their unborn child and is eventually found dead in the bathtub.

Detectives Goodman and Wilson investigate the Landers murders. Unsettled by the house, Goodman refuses to enter, while Wilson enters to examine the scene. Upon exiting, Wilson slowly starts to lose his mind and eventually becomes hysterical when he spots Fiona's ghost outside Goodman's car. He attempts to kill himself by shooting himself but survives, leaving him disfigured and committed to a psychiatric asylum. Goodman stops looking into the case.

=== 2005 ===
In 2005, elderly couple Faith and William Matheson moved into the house. Faith has dementia, a terminal illness. After moving in, Faith is infected by the curse and starts to see Melinda around the house. Her sanity rapidly declines, causing William to call over Lorna Moody, an assisted suicide consultant.

Disturbed by Faith's state, Lorna suggests to William that they leave the house, but William reveals that he is aware of the ghosts and suggests that it implies a future where people get to be with their loved ones after death. Lorna later discovers that Faith has killed William and has sliced off her own fingers. Lorna flees in horror, only to be attacked in her car by Sam's ghost, causing her to crash, killing her.

=== 2006 ===
In 2006, (Note: Simultaneous with The Grudge 2 (2006) and The Grudge 3 (2009).) rookie detective Muldoon moved to town with her son Burke following her husband's death. Muldoon and Goodman, her new partner, are called to the woods, where Lorna's corpse has been discovered. Goodman becomes uncomfortable when they learn that Lorna has been visiting 44 Reyburn Drive, revealing his suspicion that the house is cursed.

Muldoon goes to the house, discovering a disoriented Faith and William's corpse. Faith is taken to a hospital, where she sees Melinda and kills herself by jumping off a staircase landing. As Muldoon continues her research into the case, she is haunted by the ghosts of the Landers. She visits Wilson in the asylum, who tells her that all people who enter the house will become victims of the curse. Wilson then gouges out his eyes so he can stop seeing the ghosts, but his hallucinations continue.

Fearful that the curse may make her hurt her son, Muldoon confides in Goodman and learns that the curse began with a family in Japan; Fiona is the one who brought it abroad. After she is attacked by the Landers' ghosts again, Muldoon goes to the house and douses it in gasoline as she sees visions of how Fiona murdered her family. The curse creates an apparition resembling Burke, but Muldoon realizes it isn't really him after he fails to repeat a phrase the two of them use regularly. The house burns to the ground as Muldoon embraces her real son outside.

Sometime later, Muldoon hugs Burke before he leaves for school, only to see the real Burke leave the house. The "Burke" she is hugging is revealed to be Melinda. Muldoon is dragged away by Fiona's ghost, becoming the next victim of the curse.

== Cast ==
- Tara Westwood as Fiona Landers
- Junko Bailey as Kayako Saeki
- David Lawrence Brown as Sam Landers
- Zoe Fish as Melinda Landers
- Andrea Riseborough as Detective Muldoon
- John Hansen as Burke
- Demián Bichir as Goodman
- Joel Marsh Garland as Detective Grecco
- Bradley Sawatzky as Officer Michaels
- Lin Shaye as Faith Matheson
- John Cho as Peter Spencer
- Betty Gilpin as Nina Spencer
- Stephanie Sy as Amnio Nurse
- Jacki Weaver as Lorna Moody
- Frankie Faison as William Matheson
- William Sadler as Detective Wilson
- Evan Scott as Psychotic Asylum Patient
- Nancy Sorel as Agent Cole

== Production ==
A fourth installment of the American The Grudge film series was first announced in August 2011, to be developed by Ghost House Pictures and Mandate Pictures. It was also announced that the film was set to be a reboot. In November 2011, Roy Lee, who was an executive producer of the previous three films, revealed that the producers were still undecided on what the fourth installment would entail. According to Lee, they were still "hearing takes from writers on what they could bring to the table on what their thoughts are on a new version."

In March 2014, it was announced that Jeff Buhler was hired to write the script, and the film would be produced by Ghost House Pictures and Good Universe. Buhler stated in April that the film would not involve the 2004 film or any of the Japanese Ju-On films. Instead, it would introduce new ghosts, characters, and mythology. Buhler also clarified that although the mythology would be pushed forward, they would try to keep the "concept and spirits" of the films. It was also reported that the character of Kayako Saeki, who had been central to the previous three installments, would be absent from the reboot.

In July 2017, it was reported that Nicolas Pesce was hired as director and that he would be rewriting Buhler's draft of the script. Pesce stated that the film would be "[much] darker, grittier, and more realistic."

Lin Shaye stated, "What will make it really different is [Nicolas] Pesce, who is the writer/director, who is extraordinary. I mean he's a real visionary. I had a phenomenal time working with him. He was very open to my ideas, which he told me he never is. He said, I don't usually let actors do what they want. He said, But in your case, there were no rules. I was inspired. The ideas I came up with were inspired by what he was creating. And he acknowledged that and allowed it."

In March 2018, it was reported that Andrea Riseborough would star in the film. Later, it was announced that Demián Bichir had also joined the cast and that filming was set to start in May 2018. John Cho and Shaye were added to the cast in March 2018, and in April 2018, Jacki Weaver, Betty Gilpin, William Sadler, and Frankie Faison also signed on. Takako Fuji, who previously played Kayako Saeki in the franchise, voiced Faith Matheson and Fiona Landers in the Japanese dub of the film.

Principal photography began on May 7, 2018, in Winnipeg, Manitoba, and ended on June 23, 2018. Additional photography and reshoots took place in June 2019.

== Release ==
The Grudge was released by Sony Pictures Releasing in Indonesia on December 31, 2019, followed by other international territories in the subsequent days, and in the United States on January 3, 2020. The film was released on Digital HD on March 10, 2020, and on DVD and Blu-ray on March 24, 2020, and grossed $1.1 million in home video sales.

== Reception ==
=== Box office ===
In the United States and Canada, The Grudge was projected to gross $11–15 million from 2,642 theaters in its opening weekend. The film made $5.4 million on its first day, including $1.8 million from Thursday night previews. It went on to debut at $11.4 million, finishing fifth and marking the lowest opening of any U.S. theatrical film in the series. The film fell 69% in its second weekend to $3.5 million, finishing eleventh.

The Grudge grossed $21.2 million in the United States and Canada and $28.3 million in other territories, for a worldwide total of $49.5 million.

=== Critical response ===
On the review aggregator website Rotten Tomatoes, 20% of 128 critics' reviews are positive, with an average rating of 4.1/10. The website's consensus reads: "Dull and derivative, the rebooted Grudge wastes a talented cast and filmmaker on watered-down scares that may leave viewers nursing grievances of their own." Metacritic, which uses a weighted average, assigned the film a score of 41 out of 100, based on 28 critics, indicating "mixed or average" reviews. Audiences polled by CinemaScore gave the film a rare average grade of "F" on an A+ to F scale, while those at PostTrak gave it an average 0.5 out of 5 stars.

Mick LaSalle of the San Francisco Chronicle said the film was all premise and no development, adding, "I saw this movie in the middle of the day, having had a great night's sleep, and I had to slap myself awake a few times." Variety's Owen Gleiberman called the film "a reboot of a remake of a film that wasn't all that scary to begin with" and wrote, "The Grudge plods on as if it were something more than formula gunk, cutting back and forth among the thinly written unfortunates who've been touched by the curse of that house." Nick Allen of RogerEbert.com gave the film 3 out of 4 stars, saying that it is "often as nasty as you want it to be, its cheesy jump-scares and generic packaging be damned."

Noel Murray of The Los Angeles Times wrote, "This is not a 'fun' horror picture. It's about miseries both supernatural and mundane. And, yes, it's scary. Pesce's art-film roots are evident in the movie's slow-burn first hour. But in the final third, The Grudge piles on the explicit gore and jump scares — all leading to a final scene and final shot as terrifying as anything in the original series. If the angry, vengeful 'Ju-On' ghosts must endure, they might as well be deployed by someone who knows how to make their attacks bruising." Ben Kenigsberg of The New York Times said, "The remake remains cursed by a fatally hokey concept."

== Future ==
In September 2019, The Grudge (2019) director Nicolas Pesce expressed interest in a crossover film between The Grudge and The Ring American film series. In January 2020, Pesce expressed further interest in a sequel being set in both a different part of the world than America or Japan, and in a different "less contemporary" time period compared to previous films.
