= Ju-On: The Curse =

Ju-on: The Curse
- VHS cover
- Directed by: Takashi Shimizu
- Written by: Takashi Shimizu
- Produced by: Takashige Ichise; Kazuo Katō; Masaaki Takashima
- Starring: Yūrei Yanagi; Chiaki Kuriyama; Hitomi Miwa; Takako Fuji; Takashi Matsuyama
- Cinematography: Nobuhito Kisuki
- Music by: Gary Ashiya
- Distributed by: Toei Video Company
- Release date: 11 February 2000
- Running time: 70 minutes
- Country: Japan
- Language: Japanese

Ju-on: The Curse (呪怨, Juon), also known as simply Ju-on, is a 2000 Japanese V-Cinema supernatural horror film and the first installment in the Ju-on franchise, following two short films. The film was written and directed by Takashi Shimizu and is divided into six parts, chronicling the experiences of tenants of a cursed house where a man, Takeo Saeki (Takashi Matsuyama) killed his wife, Kayako (Takako Fuji), in a jealous rage. It was followed by Ju-on: The Curse 2 in the same year.

== Plot ==
After discovering that his wife Kayako was still in love with her college friend Shunsuke Kobayashi, and deluding himself into believing the two were in an affair, illustrator Takeo Saeki murdered her, their son Toshio, and the family cat Mar, then deserted his house. The anger and sorrow surrounding the murder created a curse that turned its inhabitants into Onryō. Whoever enters the house in Nerima, Tokyo, or even those associating themselves with someone who has entered the house will be affected and claimed by the curse, spreading its influence at the place they die and claiming more victims.

Kobayashi, who happens to be Toshio's elementary school teacher, notices his repeated absence from school. He visits the Saeki house, leaving his pregnant wife Manami at home. He finds Toshio, who refuses to speak with him, forcing him to wait for the parents. Kobayashi grows weary of the strangeness surrounding the house. After accidentally stumbling upon Kayako's room, he learns of her unrequited love for him and finds her bloody corpse hidden in the attic. Panicked, Kobayashi tries to escape with Toshio until he receives a call from Takeo, who has gone to his apartment and killed Manami by forcefully aborting her unborn fetus. In shock, he is unable to respond properly as Kayako's corpse reanimates and kills him. Meanwhile, Takeo carries the dead fetus in the street and is killed by Kayako.

Sometime later, the Saeki house is occupied by the Murakami family. The daughter Kanna is with her tutor Yuki until she remembers that she has to go to school to feed the school rabbits. Yuki, who has a phobia of cats, backs up towards Kanna's closet when a black cat suddenly appears in the house. Hearing strange sounds from the attic, she investigates and is killed by Kayako.

Unaware of the incident, Kanna's brother Tsuyoshi leaves for school to meet his girlfriend Mizuho Tamura. Tsuyoshi never makes it to the school and Mizuho is forced to wait in the teacher's room while a teacher inspects the school once more. There, she is spooked by Toshio until she receives a call from "4444444444" (the Japanese word for 4: 四, shi, is pronounced similarly to the word for "death": 死, shi), at which point, Toshio appears directly beside her.

Detective Yoshikawa and his aide Kamio investigate the mutilated body of high schooler Hisayo Yoshida, one of the two students scheduled to feed the school rabbits, and a human jaw nearby. Back at the Murakami house, mother Noriko has just returned home when she notices a disheveled Kanna entering her house. Her daughter moves to face her, showing her without her jaw, causing Noriko to scream in horror.

Sometime later, the Nerima house is taken over by the Suzuki Real Estate, owned by Tatsuya Suzuki, for sale. Tatsuya contacts his spiritually aware sister, Kyoko, to visit the house. She immediately feels discomfort upon entering and becomes further disturbed after a brief meeting with Kayako. After gulping sake, Kyoko tells Tatsuya that anyone who wants to purchase the house has to drink the sake. According to an old custom, if they find the sake distasteful, that means they are being surrounded by bad spirits. She makes a hasty escape from the house, leaving her brother behind. A while later, Kyoko is informed that the house has been sold to Yoshima and Hiroshi Kitada, who find the sake pleasant. However, Kyoko is startled by Yoshima, who stares at her from a window.

== Cast ==
- Yūrei Yanagi as Shunsuke Kobayashi (小林 俊介, Kobayashi Shunsuke)
- Chiaki Kuriyama as Mizuho Tamura (田村 瑞穂, Tamura Mizuho)
- Hitomi Miwa as Yuki (由紀)
- Asumi Miwa as Kanna Murakami (村上 柑菜, Murakami Kanna)
- Kazushi Andō as Tsuyoshi Murakami (村上 強志, Murakami Tsuyoshi)
- Yumi Yoshiyuki as Noriko Murakami (村上 典子, Murakami Noriko)
- Yue as Manami Kobayashi (小林 真奈美, Kobayashi Manami)
- Kaori Fujii as Yoshimi Kitada (北田 良美, Kitada Yoshimi)
- Yūko Daike as Kyoko Suzuki (鈴木 響子, Suzuki Kyōko)
- Makoto Ashikawa as Tatsuya Suzuki (鈴木 達也, Suzuki Tatsuya)
- Takako Fuji as Kayako Saeki
- Ryōta Koyama as Toshio Saeki
- Takashi Matsuyama as Takeo Saeki

== Release and reception ==
Ju-On: The Curse was released on home video on February 11, 2000. The film will be released in Japan in theaters in 4K resolution on August 8, 2025.

AllMovie called it a "surprisingly effective low-budget horror video from Japan", writing, "while the plot never quite comes together—it's haphazard and confusing—the movie succeeds because of its unnervingly creepy atmosphere and consistently mournful and unsettling tone".

== Stage adaptation ==
A stage play adaptation of Ju-On was developed in 2023. It adapts the plots from this film and its sequel.

== Sources ==
- Kalat, David (2007). J-Horror: The Definitive Guide to The Ring, The Grudge and Beyond. Vertical Inc. ISBN 978-1-932234-08-4.
