= The Grudge 3 =

2009 film by Toby Wilkins

- DVD cover
- Directed by: Toby Wilkins
- Written by: Brad Keene
- Based on: Ju-on: The Grudge by Takashi Shimizu
- Produced by: Andrew Pfeffer; Takashige Ichise
- Starring: Johanna Braddy; Gil McKinney; Emi Ikehata; Jadie Rose Hobson; Beau Mirchoff; Matthew Knight; Shawnee Smith
- Cinematography: Anton Bakarski
- Edited by: John Quinn
- Music by: Sean McMahon
- Production companies: Stage 6 Films; Ghost House Pictures
- Distributed by: Sony Pictures Home Entertainment
- Release date: May 12, 2009
- Running time: 91 minutes
- Country: United States
- Languages: English; Japanese
- Box office: $1.9 million

The Grudge 3 is a 2009 American supernatural horror film directed by Toby Wilkins and written by Brad Keene. The film is a sequel to The Grudge 2 (2006) and the third installment in the American The Grudge film series. The film stars Johanna Braddy, Gil McKinney, Emi Ikehata, Jadie Rose Hobson, Beau Mirchoff, and Shawnee Smith, with a special appearance by Matthew Knight. It features a linear plotline unlike all of its predecessors, which used nonlinear sequences of events for their respective plots and subplots.

The Grudge 3 was released straight-to-video on May 12, 2009, by Sony Pictures Home Entertainment and grossed $5 million in home sales. The theatrical release of the film occurred in some countries internationally and grossed $1.9 million. The film was followed by The Grudge in 2019.

== Plot ==
In 2006, Jake Kimble was under the care of Dr. Sullivan in an asylum and was locked in his room following several escape attempts. During the time Dr. Sullivan arrives with an orderly, Jake is found murdered by Kayako although her spirit cannot be seen on security cameras. News of the incident reaches Tokyo, Japan as Kayako's younger sister Naoko, aware of her older sister's haunting, travels to Chicago, Illinois, USA.

The apartment building where Jake lived is under renovation. Of the few residents who remain, some glimpse Toshio. Several people associated with the cursed apartment begin to die, including Renee's mute daughter Brenda, Rose's babysitter and family friend Gretchen, Lisa's boyfriend Andy, and Max's boss Mr. Praski. Dr. Sullivan, while investigating Jake's death, speaks with the residents and finds that others have seen the little boy of whom Jake spoke. Dr. Sullivan digs more into the information and is murdered by Kayako.

Naoko moves in while the spirits of Kayako and Toshio kill various residents and anyone associated with them. She tells the landlord's family that the curse now resides in the apartment and tries to convince them to participate in an exorcism. The landlord's sister, Lisa, refuses to cooperate but reconsiders when she realizes that her brother, Max, is possessed by Takeo's evil spirit, and the source of the curse. Naoko explains that the ceremony must not be interrupted and tells Lisa and Max's sister, Rose, that she must drink Kayako's blood. Lisa refuses. The possessed Max realizes Naoko's attempts and murders her. Lisa is chased by Kayako until, just as the croaking onryō is about to murder Lisa, Rose drinks Kayako's blood which causes her curse to disappear.

Max, who has been exorcised of Takeo's evil possession upon Kayako's banishment, stares in horror at the body of Naoko, but her murder has begun a new curse. Naoko's spirit attacks and kills him. Hearing his screams, Lisa investigates only to find his corpse. Escorted out of the apartment by the authorities, Lisa hugs a traumatized Rose and promises that they’ll always be together. The camera then pans to show that she’s actually hugging Kayako, her spirit now sealed inside Rose’s body.

== Cast ==
- Johanna Braddy as Lisa, a young woman who plans to move to New York and pursue a fashion career
- Gil McKinney as Max, Lisa and Rose's older brother
- Emi Ikehata as Naoko Kawamata, Kayako's younger sister
- Jadie Rose Hobson as Rose, Lisa and Max's sister
- Shawnee Smith as Sullivan, a doctor who works at the mental hospital
- Marina Sirtis as Gretchen, a painter
- Beau Mirchoff as Andy, Lisa's boyfriend
- Matthew Knight as Jake Kimble, the traumatized young boy and sole survivor of the previous film
- Aiko Horiuchi as Kayako Saeki, a ghost who is bent on killing anyone she sees
- Shimba Tsuchiya as Toshio Saeki, a ghost that occupies the house
- Michael McCoy as Mr. Praski, Max's boss
- Takatsuna Mukai as Daisuke, Naoko's husband
- Laura Giosh as Renee, a tenant who moves out with her daughter Brenda after the Kimble family deaths
- Mihaela Nankova as Brenda, the frightened daughter of Renee

Additionally, Takako Fuji, Takashi Matsuyama, Kim Miyori, Yuya Ozeki, Ohga Tanaka, Masanobu Yada, Nahana and Kyoka Takizawa reprise their roles from The Grudge and The Grudge 2 via archival footage and stills.

== Production ==
During post-production of The Grudge 2, Takashi Shimizu discussed ideas of creating another sequel, saying: "During the script meeting, our ideas didn't go anywhere good, and we couldn't come up with anything interesting to stop the curse, so if that's the case, I would rather just go for something that could never be stopped. But who knows, maybe something can be stopped in The Grudge 3." In the 2006 Comic Con, Sony officially announced plans of creating the sequel. Shimizu revealed he was offered the chance to direct the sequel but took on the role as executive producer instead.

The film put out a casting call for new actors to play Kayako and Toshio, as Takako Fuji (Kayako) and Ohga Tanaka (Toshio) passed on the opportunity. Shawnee Smith was cast in this film. Principal photography took place in Bulgaria on March 3, 2008, and ended three weeks later.

== Release ==
=== Theatrical ===
The Grudge 3 received a theatrical release internationally grossing a total of $1.9 million.

=== Home media ===
The DVD release was originally scheduled for March 24, 2009, but was delayed until May 12, 2009. Two featurettes appear: "Tokyagoaria" documents how the Bulgarian location was made to look like Tokyo and Chicago, and "The Curse Continues" shows how the film ties into the previous two. Three deleted scenes also are included. A Region Free United Kingdom Blu-ray was released on June 1, 2009.

== Reception ==
=== Critical response ===
Bloody Disgusting gave the film two and a half skulls, feeling it lackluster, and saying "watching The Grudge 3 is like eating the generic brand of your favorite cereal, you can try to tell yourself all day that its just as good as the real thing, but inside, deep inside, you know it tastes different." Comingsoon.net found the film "dull" and complained that even the ending offered no answers. Cinefantastique Online slammed the film calling it "such a dismally spiritless affair that it almost seems deliberately designed to make the disappointing THE GRUDGE 2 look good by comparison."

== Interquel ==
A new installment, The Grudge, was directed by Nicolas Pesce. Originally announced as a reboot, the film is a sidequel, set during and after the events of the first three The Grudge films. Andrea Riseborough stars in the film as a young mother and detective, named Muldoon. The film was released on December 31, 2019, featuring the characters of Kayako and Toshio in cameo appearances.

== See also ==
- List of ghost films
