= Aiko Horiuchi =

Japanese actress

- Born: November 29, 1984 (age 41)
- Occupations: Actress, writer, painter
- Years active: 2002—present

Aiko Horiuchi (堀内 愛子, Horiuchi Aiko) is a Japanese painter, writer, and actress. She is best known for her role of the villainess Kayako Saeki in The Grudge 3 (2009), taking over for Takako Fuji, who had passed on the role.

== Career ==
Her acting career began in episodic Television work as a non featured performer in such series as EastEnders and Holby City. She furthered her acting career by appearing as an extra in various films such as Die Another Day (2002), Charlie and the Chocolate Factory (2005), and Rabbit Fever (2006).

Horiuchi is a friend of Tim Burton in real life, which led to her being cast in his Charlie and the Chocolate Factory film. She plays the clerk at the Japanese candy store, who lets in all the children ready to buy Wonka Bars in the hopes of getting a Golden Ticket.

She also had a small role in Thor: The Dark World (2013) as an esteemed guest who bows to Odin in the throne room, and as an Asgardian physician who is treating Jane Foster.

Horiuchi starred in The Grudge 3 (2009) as Kayako Saeki, the vengeful ghost of the Ju-on series (called "The Grudge"), taking over for Takako Fuji who had passed on the role. Her performance received a mixed, if not muted, response.

== Filmography ==
Year	Title	Role	Notes
1999	EastEnders	Extra	Unknown Episodes
1999	Holby City	Extra	Unknown Episodes
2002	Die Another Day	Korean Spy	Uncredited
2005	Charlie and the Chocolate Factory	Japanese Shopkeeper	Uncredited
2006	Rabbit Fever	Japanese Traveler	Uncredited
2009	The Grudge 3	Kayako Saeki	
2010	London Fields		Short Film
2012	Vampire Kiss/Blood Inside	Agnes Ashmoore	Short Film
2012	The Killers: Here with Me	Fan	Music Video
2013	Thor: The Dark World	Esteemed Guest	Uncredited
2014	Film Lab Presents	Yumiko	Episode: Film Lab Presents the Things We Do for Approval
2015	Le Fear II: Le Sequel	Lucy Lou	
2017	God Came 'Round	Nice Girl	Short Film
2022	Dream of the Blue Mushroom		Short Film
TBA	Le Fear III: Le Cannes	Lucy Lou	Pre-Production
