= Kayako Saeki =

Fictional character in the Ju-On franchise

- Ju-On and The Grudge character
- Takako Fuji as Kayako Saeki
- First appearance: Katasumi (1998)
- Last appearance: The Grudge: The Untold Chapter (2020)
- Created by: Takashi Shimizu
- Portrayed by: Takako Fuji (Katasumi, Ju-on: The Curse, Ju-on: The Curse 2, Ju-on: The Grudge, Ju-on: The Grudge 2, The Grudge, The Grudge 2); Misaki Saishō (Ju-on: The Beginning of the End, Ju-on: The Final Curse); Kyōka Takizawa (Young Kayako) (The Grudge 2); Aiko Horiuchi (The Grudge 3); Anna Moon (Tales from the Grudge); Tomoko Satō (Scary Movie 4); Runa Endō (Sadako vs. Kayako); Junko Bailey (The Grudge: The Untold Chapter)

In-universe information
- Full name: Kayako Saeki (née Kawamata); Rose (reborn, The Grudge 3)
- Species: Human (formerly); Onryō
- Gender: Female
- Occupation: Housewife
- Family: Takeo Saeki (husband); Toshio Saeki (son); Nakagawa Kawamata (mother; American version only); Naoko Kawamata (sister; American version only); Daisuke (brother-in-law; American version only)
- Nationality: Japanese

Kayako Saeki (佐伯 伽椰子, Saeki Kayako) is a fictional character and the main antagonist of the Ju-On horror franchise. Kayako's fictional history alternates slightly between continuities, but all depict her as the attractive but vengeful ghost of a woman killed by her husband, Takeo, along with their son Toshio, in a murder–suicide that happened after he came to believe she was having an affair. After the crime, the spirits of all three are bound to their family home, haunting and killing all who enter in the following years.

Saeki has been played by a number of actresses in films, including Takako Fuji in Katasumi (1998), Ju-On: The Curse, Ju-On: The Curse 2 (both 2000), Ju-On: The Grudge (2002), Ju-On: The Grudge 2 (2003), and the American remake films The Grudge (2004) and The Grudge 2 (2006), Misaki Saishō in Ju-On: The Beginning of the End (2014) and Ju-On: The Final Curse (2015), Kyōka Takizawa as a child in the American The Grudge 2, Aiko Horiuchi in the American The Grudge 3 (2009), Anna Moon in the American Tales from the Grudge (2006), and Junko Bailey in the American The Grudge: The Untold Chapter (2020).

The American adaptations expand the backstory of the character, with her only cameo appearance occurring in the 2020 film, where her "grudge" is transferred to other spirits. Saeki also appears in Kōji Shiraishi's 2016 crossover film Sadako vs. Kayako (portrayed by Runa Endō), alongside The Ring antagonist Sadako Yamamura.

== History and characteristics ==
=== Japanese timeline ===
In the (Ju-on timeline), as revealed in the official novel written by Kei Ohishi, both of Saeki's parents were absent and highly neglectful, causing her to feel depressed and lonely.

Kayako spent most of her free time with her cat Kuro and was highly anti-social. In the first installment of the Ju-on franchise (Ju-on: The Curse), Kobayashi's wife Manami [sic] remarks that she remembers Kayako from college and that she found her "creepy". Kayako became highly jealous of Manami and even tried to curse her but failed and eventually gave up. When she attends university, she meets Shunsuke Kobayashi, with whom she falls deeply in love. After the accidental deaths of her parents which did not seem to faze her, Kayako marries Takeo Saeki, the only person who understands and cares for her, and together, they have a son named Toshio. By now, Kobayashi is Toshio's school teacher, and she falls in love with him again.

She writes of her feelings for him in the journal she kept all her life; in most variations of the story, Takeo ends up finding and reading her diary. He becomes obsessed with the idea that Kayako is cheating on him with his son's teacher – or worse, Toshio could not be his son, but Kobayashi's. When she gets home that day, he violently attacks her upstairs, pushing her against the wall. Toshio is in his bedroom drawing and hears the noise and coming outside, watches the violence which is occurring below through the banisters. Kayako tries to run away while Takeo chases her, but he pushes her down. She sprains her ankle, stumbles, and falls, and has to go down their house stairs by crawling. After much effort, she makes it to the front door, only to find Takeo slowly walking behind her, watching her suffer. He then snaps her neck to a 90-degree angle and crushes her throat, takes her to their bedroom, and puts her in a trash bag. Kayako is still alive, but paralyzed, capable only of letting out a croaking moan. Takeo stabs her multiple times (an event that is not shown explicitly in either Ju-On: The Grudge or The Grudge, but is heavily hinted at, as Takeo is shown lowering a box cutter to her face in the former and dragging her bloody body in the latter). Then, he puts her body in the far corner of the attic, through an attic door in the ceiling of their bedroom closet.

After her death, she becomes an Onryō because of the painful and torturous nature of her death. In the novel, her spirit first claimed Toshio, possibly to save him. In the American films, Toshio is drowned by his father in the bathtub along with his pet cat.

==== Sadako vs. Kayako ====
Kayako appears in the 2016 film Sadako vs. Kayako, along with the onryo from the Ring series, Sadako Yamamura.

Through a rumor, it is explained that Kayako was repeatedly stabbed to death by her husband before he drowned their son, Toshio, and hanged himself. Ever since, Kayako's and Toshio's spirits haunt their household, killing anyone who sets foot inside.

Suzuka Takagi moves in next door with her parents, where she already experiences supernatural visions of the foreboding house.

The psychic, Keizo Tokiwa, intended to have Kayako battle Sadako and have them destroy each other to free their current and future victims from their curses. At the same time, however, after spiriting away four schoolboys, Suzuka believes she sees one of them in the house late at night and goes there to check on him, only to have her parents follow after her as well. After Suzuka's father is taken, Kayako appears, taking Suzuka's mother's feet before capturing her. Kayako was quickly warded off with an essence of Sadako's spirit for Keizo, Yuri, and Tamao to save Suzuka.

The following night, Suzuka and Yuri enter the house to inflict both curses on themselves – Yuri having previously watched the cursed video two nights prior, and Suzuka setting up a television and VCR to watch it in the house. With this, Kayako and Sadako emerge, and with one in the other's way, they enter a brutal conflict. Initially, Kayako dragged Sadako away, only to quickly be overcome and temporarily destroyed.

As Kayako returned, the conflict between the two spirits temporarily allowed the girls and Keizo to escape the house. They retreated to a well, where Keizo explains that one must sacrifice themselves to trap both Sadako and Kayako in the well, to which Yuri volunteers. Just as she jumps into the well, Kayako accidentally merges with Sadako, thus creating a new, all-powerful spirit. The cluster descended after Yuri, possessing her body before breaking out of the sealed well a moment later. With this, the new spirit became a new curse.

=== American timeline ===
Kayako spends her childhood with her younger sister (Emi Ikehata) and mother (Kim Miyori), an Itako (Japanese exorcist) who uses Kayako to "eat" the evil spirits she drives away from her patients. Kayako's sister Naoko was spared of this treatment. This marks young Kayako for the rest of her life, making her a target for gossip and cruelty. Kayako did not seem to have a father-figure in her life in the American films. Unlike in Ju-on, Kayako did not lead a normal childhood, and her mother was highly abusive. Therefore, the primary reason for her becoming an Onryō in The Grudge is because of the malevolent spirits she was fed by her mother, and not purely because of the painful nature of her death.

After her husband snaps her neck and leaves her paralyzed, he proceeds to drown their son and his pet cat in a tub. Soon afterward, Kayako murders her husband by hanging him from the ceiling with her hair. Peter Kirk, a man she was obsessively in love with, finds Kayako's body in the attic and commits suicide soon afterward. All ghosts of the Saeki family members now haunt the house.

Several years later, a young girl named Allison transfers the curse to Chicago. Kayako starts haunting an apartment building which leads to her sister, Naoko, trying to stop her. Kayako does not attempt to attack or kill Naoko, but the spirit of her murderous husband does, and Naoko is killed in an even more violent fashion than her sister. Naoko then shockingly turns into a vengeful Onryō as well, despite her mother not feeding her evil spirits like she did Kayako, and kills her attacker.

== See also ==
- Onryō
- Yūrei
- Sadako Yamamura
