= Shimba Tsuchiya =

Japanese voice actor

- 土屋 神葉
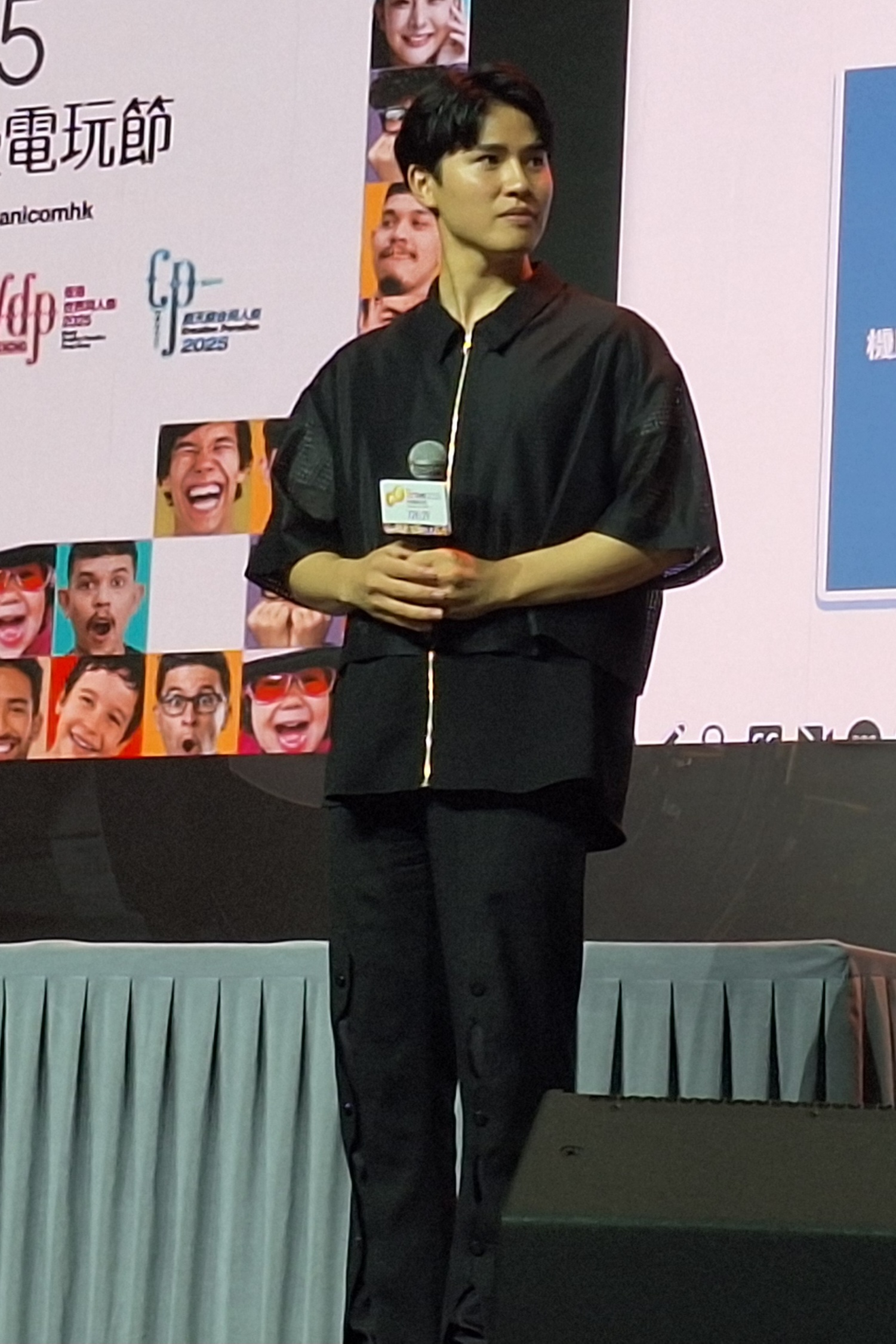
- Tsuchiya at Animation-Comic-Game Hong Kong 2025
- Born: April 4, 1996 (age 30); Tokyo, Japan
- Occupations: Actor; voice actor
- Years active: 2005–present
- Relatives: Honoka Tsuchiya (sister); Tao Tsuchiya (sister); Ryota Katayose (brother-in-law)
- Website: simbatsuchiya.studio.site

Shimba Tsuchiya (土屋 神葉, Tsuchiya Shinba; born April 4, 1996) is a Japanese actor. Tsuchiya is best known for portraying Tsutomu Goshiki in Haikyū!! and Tatara Fujita in Welcome to the Ballroom. As an actor, he is best known for his role of Toshio Saeki in the 2009 horror film, The Grudge 3. He has two older sisters; Honoka, a model, and Tao Tsuchiya, also an actress.

== Filmography ==
=== Anime ===
2016

- Haikyū!! as Tsutomu Goshiki

2017

- The Dragon Dentist
- Welcome to the Ballroom as Tatara Fujita

2018

- Beatless as Student C, Soldier A
- Sanrio Boys as Various roles
- Working Buddies! as Belugamine-senpai

2019

- Midnight Occult Civil Servants as Tarobo
- O Maidens in Your Savage Season as Izumi Norimoto

2021

- Farewell, My Dear Cramer as Yasuaki Tani
- Backflip!! as Shōtarō Futaba
- The Aquatope on White Sand as Kai Nakamura

2022

- Police in a Pod as Takeshi Yamada
- Fanfare of Adolescence as Shun Kazanami
- Love All Play as Hirohito Monda
- Shoot! Goal to the Future as Kōhei Kokubo

2023

- In/Spectre 2nd Season as Kazuyuki Konno
- Ao no Orchestra as Nao Saeki
- Sorcerous Stabber Orphen: Sanctuary Arc as Kakorkist

2024

- Shinkalion: Change the World as Ryota Kuzuryu
- Delico's Nursery as Uru Delico (adolescent)
- Sound! Euphonium as Motomu Tsukinaga

2025

- Mobile Suit Gundam GQuuuuuuX as Shuji Ito
- Clevatess as Minark
- April Showers Bring May Flowers as Yosuke Ueno
- Disney Twisted-Wonderland the Animation as Epel Felmier
- Let's Play as Marshall Law
- Shabake as Eikichi

2026

- Marriagetoxin as Piichi Nakagawa
- The World Is Dancing as Ishiya
- Suikoden: The Anime as Jowy
- Hell Teacher: Jigoku Sensei Nube as Makoto Kurita (adult)

2027

- Inherit the Winds as Harada Sanosuke

=== Video games ===
- Welcome to the Ballroom (2017) as Tatara Fujita
- Idol Fantasy (2018) as Daiga Hashizume
- Disney: Twisted-Wonderland (2020) as Epel Felmier
- Angelique Luminarise (2021) as Yue
- Touken Ranbu (2025) as Kurikara Gou

=== Theatrical animation ===
- K: Seven Stories (2018) as Takeru Kusuhara
- Sound! Euphonium: The Movie – Our Promise: A Brand New Day (2019) as Motomu Tsukinaga
- Burn the Witch (2020) as Balgo Parks
- Farewell, My Dear Cramer: First Touch (2021) as Yasuaki Tani
- Backflip!! (2022) as Shōtarō Futaba
- Whoever Steals This Book (2025) as Takafumi Haruta
- To You in the Beyond (2026) as Mikiya Ozaki

=== Dubbing ===
==== Live-action ====
- Supah Ninjas (2012) as Flint Forster (Cody Christian)
- Hawaii Five-0 (2018) as Reese Holland (Joey Luthman)
- Pacific Rim: Uprising (2018) as Tahima (Rahart Adams)
- Bumblebee (2019) as Tripp Summers (Ricardo Hoyos)
- Almost Never (2022) as Oakley (Oakley Orchard)
- The Holdovers (2024) as Teddy Kountze (Brady Hepner)
- Serial Mom (2025) as Chip Sutphin (Matthew Lillard)

==== Animation ====
- Teenage Mutant Ninja Turtles: Mutant Mayhem (2023) as Raphael

=== Movies ===
- Gunjō (2009)
- Pedal no Yukue (2009)
- The Grudge 3 (2009) as Toshio Saeki
- The Three Young-Men in Midnight: The Movie 2 (2024)
- Mobile Suit Gundam GQuuuuuuX - Beginning - (2025) as Shunji Ito

=== Television drama ===
- Ryōmaden (2010)
- Tokusatsu Gagaga (2019) as Shishi Leo (voice)
- Aikatsu Planet! (2021)
- Ultraman Trigger: New Generation Tiga (2021) as Ribut
- No.1 Sentai Gozyuger (2026) as Origa Red (voice)
