= Takashi Shimizu =

Japanese filmmaker (born 1972)

Takashi Shimizu 清水 崇
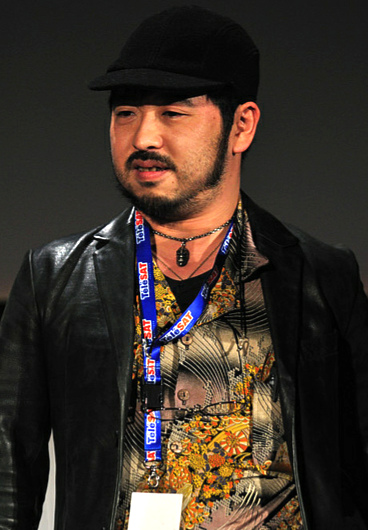
- Born: 27 July 1972 (age 54); Maebashi, Gunma, Japan
- Education: Nihon University
- Occupations: Director; producer; screenwriter
- Years active: 1994-present

Takashi Shimizu (清水 崇 Shimizu Takashi, born 27 July 1972) is a Japanese filmmaker. He is best known for being the creator of the Ju-On franchise, directing the first four installments, in addition to directing the first two installments in its American remake franchise, The Grudge.

According to film scholar Wheeler Winston Dixon, Shimizu is "one of a new breed of Japanese horror directors" who prefers to "suggest menace and violence rather than directly depict it".

== Early life ==
Shimizu was born on 27 July 1972, in Maebashi, Tokyo. He attended Wakamiya Elementary School and Maebashi City Fourth Junior High School before graduating from Gunma Prefectural Chuo High School. He initially enrolled in Kindai University but dropped out. He then enrolled in Nihon University where he met future collaborator and film producer Takashige Ichise. Together they went on to develop Ju-On.

== Career ==
After graduating, Shimizu was given the opportunity to direct the short films Katasumi and 4444444444 for Kansai TV's horror omnibus Gakkou no Kaidan G. The two shorts later served as forerunners to the Ju-On franchise

Shimizu made his feature directorial debut with the direct-to-video supernatural horror, Ju-On: The Curse and its sequel Ju-On: The Curse 2. The positive reception of those two films led to the theatrical sequels, Ju-On: The Grudge and Ju-On: The Grudge 2. Ju-On: The Grudge received positive feedback from critics and audiences, while Ju-On: The Grudge 2 was met with a more mixed reception.

Shimizu was later brought back to direct the American remakes The Grudge and The Grudge 2. The films were both a box-office success, but were met with mixed reception from mainstream critics. Shimizu decided to step back from the franchise, taking on a producing role for the direct-to-video third installment, The Grudge 3, and eventually returned to Japanese cinema afterwards.

== Filmography ==
- Katasumi and 4444444444, stories from "School Ghost Story G" (1998) (TV)
- Ju-on: The Curse (2000) (Video)
- Ju-on: The Curse 2 (2000) (Video)
- Kubitsuri Kikyu (????) (Video)
- Shin rei bideo V: Honto ni atta kowai hanashi - kyoufushin rei shashin-kan (2000) (Video)
- Shin rei bideo VI: Honto ni atta kowai hanashi - kyoufu tarento taikendan (2000) (Video)
- Tomie: Re-birth (2001)
- Ju-on: The Grudge (2002)
- Ju-on: The Grudge 2 (2003)
- The Grudge (2004)
- Marebito (2004)
- Dark Tales of Japan, episode Blonde Kwaidan, (2004) (TV)
- The Great Horror Family (2004–2005) (TV)
- Reincarnation, (2005)
- The Grudge 2 (2006)
- Ghost vs. Alien 03 (2007)
- Ten Nights of Dream (2006)
- The Shock Labyrinth 3D (2009)
- Tormented (2011)
- Scared of the Dark (2013)
- Flight 7500 (2014)
- Kiki's Delivery Service (2014), live-action adaptation of the novel of the same name
- NightCry (2015), live-action trailer for the video game NightCry, formerly known as Project Scissors
- Resident Evil: Vendetta (2017, executive producer)
- Innocent Curse (2017)
- Howling Village (2019)
- Suicide Forest Village (2021)
- Homunculus (2021)
- Ox-Head Village (2022)
- Immersion (2023)
- Sana (2023)
- Sana: Let Me Hear (2024)
- Sana: Play with Me (2026)
- The Mouths (2026)
- The Village of Eight Gravestones (2026)

== Accolades ==
- 2022 — Star Asia Lifetime Achievement Award at 21st New York Asian Film Festival.
