= 20th Century Boys =

Japanese manga series

- Cover of the first tankōbon volume

20世紀少年 (Nijū Seiki Shōnen)
- Genre: Mystery; Science fiction; Thriller
- Manga
- Written by: Naoki Urasawa
- Published by: Shogakukan
- English publisher: AUS: Madman Entertainment; NA: Viz Media
- Magazine: Big Comic Spirits
- Original run: October 4, 1999 – April 24, 2006
- Volumes: 22
- Manga

21st Century Boys
- Written by: Naoki Urasawa
- Published by: Shogakukan
- English publisher: AUS: Madman Entertainment; NA: Viz Media
- Magazine: Big Comic Spirits
- Original run: December 25, 2006 – July 14, 2007
- Volumes: 2
- Live-action film

20th Century Boys: Beginning of the End
- Directed by: Yukihiko Tsutsumi
- Written by: Yasushi Fukuda; Takashi Nagasaki; Naoki Urasawa; Yusuke Watanabe
- Music by: Ryomei Shirai
- Licensed by: NA: Viz Pictures; UK: 4Digital Media
- Released: August 30, 2008
- Runtime: 142 minutes
- Live-action film

20th Century Boys 2: The Last Hope
- Directed by: Yukihiko Tsutsumi
- Written by: Takashi Nagasaki; Yusuke Watanabe
- Music by: Ryomei Shirai
- Licensed by: NA: Viz Pictures; UK: 4Digital Media
- Released: January 31, 2009
- Runtime: 139 minutes
- Live-action film

20th Century Boys 3: Redemption
- Directed by: Yukihiko Tsutsumi
- Written by: Takashi Nagasaki; Naoki Urasawa
- Music by: Ryomei Shirai
- Licensed by: NA: Viz Pictures; UK: 4Digital Media
- Released: August 29, 2009
- Runtime: 155 minutes
- icon

20th Century Boys (Japanese: 20世紀少年, Hepburn: Nijusseiki Shōnen) is a Japanese manga series written and illustrated by Naoki Urasawa. It was originally serialized in Shogakukan's seinen manga magazine Big Comic Spirits from 1999 to 2006, with the 249 chapters published into 22 tankōbon volumes. A 16-chapter continuation, titled 21st Century Boys, ran in the same magazine from 2006 to 2007 and was collected into two tankōbon volumes. The series follows a young man named Kenji Endo and his friends, who notice that a cult-leader known only as "Friend" is out to destroy the world, and that his cult icon bears a striking resemblance to a symbol developed during their childhoods. The series makes many references to a number of manga and anime from the 1960s–1970s, as well as to classic rock music, with its title being taken from T. Rex's song "20th Century Boy".

A trilogy of live-action film adaptations, directed by Yukihiko Tsutsumi, were released in 2008 and 2009. The manga was licensed and released in English by Viz Media, and distributed in Australasia by Madman Entertainment. The films were also licensed by Viz in North America and by 4Digital Media in the United Kingdom.

20th Century Boys has received critical acclaim and has over 26.4 million copies in circulation. It has won several awards, including the Shogakukan Manga Award, the Kodansha Manga Award and the Seiun Award.

== Plot ==
In 1969, young boys Kenji, Otcho, Yoshitsune and Maruo build, in an empty field, a hideout they call their secret base, in which they and their friends can get together to share manga and stolen pornographic magazines and listen to a radio. To celebrate the event, Otcho draws a symbol for the base that would represent their friendship. After their friends Yukiji and Donkey join the gang, they imagine a future scenario where villains would try to destroy the world, and in which the boys would stand up and fight; this scenario is transcribed and labelled Book of Prophecy (よげんの書, Yogen no sho).

In the late 1990s, Kenji is a convenience store owner, finding solace in his childhood adventures as he takes care of his baby niece Kanna and his mother. After Donkey is reported to have committed suicide, Kenji stumbles upon a large cult led by a man known only as "Friend". With current events beginning to resemble actions from the Book of Prophecy, Kenji and his former classmates try to remember who knows about the book. They find more events unfolding such as bombings and virus attacks in San Francisco, London, and a major Japanese airport.

Kenji and his former classmates eventually uncover a plan to destroy the world on New Year's Eve of 2000, referred to in the latter part of the story as the Bloody New Year's Eve, with the use of a "giant robot", which is later revealed to be a giant balloon with robotic appendages, which spreads the virus throughout the city as well as other cities. Kenji manages to get inside the robot to plant a bomb, but is presumed dead when it explodes. From this event, the members of the Friendship Democratic Party (友民党, Yūmintō) gain widespread political popularity and power by presenting a vaccine that counters the virus, and thus take all the credit for saving the world.

Fourteen years after Bloody New Year's Eve, Kanna is a teenage girl who works at a Chinese restaurant. After she tries to defuse some interaction between various mafia groups, she discovers that a patron's friend had witnessed a Chinese mafia member get killed by a corrupted policeman. The mafia member mentions an assassination attempt on the Pope as he visits Japan. She then finds herself being hunted by members of the Friends while trying to unite the mafia groups to her cause. Meanwhile, Otcho manages to escape a maximum security prison.

Kyoko Koizumi, who attends Kanna's school, impulsively takes on a school assignment of covering Bloody New Year's Eve, but soon becomes entangled in activities involving both the Friends and the people who oppose them. After surviving a brainwashing program, she joins with Kenji's friend Yoshitsune and his resistance force.

Friend reveals a new plan, a continuation of the Book of Prophecy, in which he plans to kill every human being on Earth except for sixty million of his followers, but he is then assassinated by his chief scientist Yamane. Following this, Friend's funeral becomes a worldwide spectacle, held in a stadium with the Pope giving the address. Partway through the service, Friend appears to rise from the dead, and is shot in the shoulder by his own assassin. By saving the Pope, Friend is elevated to deity like status. Meanwhile, there is a worldwide viral outbreak that threatens to kill everyone except those who have been vaccinated.

The final portion of the story takes place in a newly remodeled Japan, under the "Era of Friend", who has instituted numerous bizarre changes, including the establishment of an Earth Defense Force, reputedly to protect Earth from an imminent alien invasion, exiling those without vaccinations, and forbidding travel across regions, under penalty of death. During this time frame, Kanna, who is revealed to be Friend's daughter, leads an insurgency against Friend's government, enlisting the aid of numerous groups, including the survivors of rival gangs and mafia organizations. During this, Kenji, apparently also risen from the dead and carrying his trademark guitar, reappears.

The series spans several decades from 1969 to 2017, the last of which in the chronology of the series, becomes 3FE (3rd Year of the Friend Era). The series makes three distinct timeline cuts during the story; one from 1971 to 1997, one from 2000 to 2014, and one from 2014 to 3FE. Several parts of the series are also told in flashbacks to previous events as the characters attempt to unravel the mystery of who Friend is and how to stop his plans of world destruction; most of the character's childhood backstories through the 1970s and 1980s are told in this fashion.

== Characters ==
Kenji Endo (遠藤 健児, Endō Kenji)
The central protagonist of the first half of the story, which revolves around his childhood in the early 1970s to the present day. He is generally laid-back, with an almost recklessly careless nonchalance, and is heavily interested in rock 'n' roll. Kenji (ケンヂ) works at his family's store which used to be a liquor store but has since been converted to a subsidiary convenience store. He, his relatives, and friends play crucial roles as the plot unfolds. Kenji's whereabouts are unknown after the events of the Bloody New Year's Eve and he is presumed dead. He reappears in 3FE as a traveling musician under the alias "Yabuki Joe" (矢吹 丈, Yabuki Jō) (a reference to the main character of Ashita no Joe). After barely escaping the robot's explosion in 2000, he experienced amnesia and wandered throughout Japan before regaining his memory during the events of 2015. His song becomes a popular underground anthem against Friend's oppression.
He is named after the Japanese musician of the same name.
Yoshitsune (ヨシツネ)
Kenji's childhood friend who created the secret base with him. He is nicknamed after the famous samurai Minamoto no Yoshitsune due to the fact that his family name is Minamoto (皆本). Ever the nervous, unconfident, and self-deprecating little guy of the group, Yoshitsune is nonetheless one of the few who answered the call to fight on Bloody New Year's Eve, where he is believed to have died. In the year 2014, Yoshitsune has become the dependable, albeit reluctant leader of an underground organization bent on taking down Friend. By 3FE, the group is now known as the Genji Faction (ゲンジ一派, Genji Ippa) after the Minamoto/Genji clan.
In the live-action film series, his full name is given as Tsuyoshi Minamoto (皆本 剛, Minamoto Tsuyoshi).
Maruo (マルオ)
Kenji's portly childhood friend. After answering the call to fight, he is believed to have died in Bloody New Year's Eve. But in 2015, he is the manager of singer Haru Namio (春 波夫) under the pseudonym "Marukobashi" (丸子橋). Namio is one of Friend's favorite entertainers, the singer of the official theme song of Expo 2015, and a former bandmate of Kenji's. Using Namio's influence and connections, the two secretly investigate and subvert the Friends, such as inserting subliminal messages in videos. After meeting Friend, Namio draws his face, allowing Maruo to identify him. In 3FE, Maruo tracks down Keroyon and Kiriko and helps distribute the vaccine.
In the live-action film series, his full name is given as Michihiro Maruo (丸尾 道浩, Maruo Michihiro).
Otcho (オッチョ)
Kenji's childhood friend, whose real name is Choji Ochiai (落合 長治, Ochiai Chōji). Around 1988, he was sent to Thailand by his Japanese trading company, but went missing for a week; upon his return he quit the company and divorced, and a year later was in India. Originally suspected to be Friend (perhaps due to the fact that he was the one who thought of the symbol which Friend's cult uses), he actually went to receive enlightenment and training from a monk after the death of his son, and was simply living in Asia's seedy underground. In 2000, Otcho is in Thailand doing jobs such as "saving" kidnapped tourists, going under the alias "Shogun" (ショーグン, Shōgun). In prime physical shape, he has escaped certain death many times, but a local drug boss allied with the Friends hunts him. When he gets a plea from Kenji for help, Otcho returns to Japan. He was arrested after the events of Bloody New Year's Eve and is housed in a maximum security prison, before eventually escaping. In 3FE, Otcho takes on the job of riding the robot and shooting down the flying saucers that will disperse the virus.
Yukiji Setoguchi (瀬戸口 ユキジ, Setoguchi Yukiji)
Kenji's female childhood friend and former classmate. During Kenji's school years, Yukiji was a tomboy who was able to fight off the bullying twins, Mabo and Yanbo. Kenji and Yukiji had crushes on each other as children but neither had the courage to confess, with Kenji's only attempt being misunderstood due to its vagueness. At the beginning of the series, Yukiji is a single unmarried woman who works as a customs official (often comically mistaken by Kenji's friends and local townsfolk for a narcotics officer). She bumps into Kenji and the gang at an airport in Tokyo when her disobedient drug sniffing dog named Blue Three (a Japanese pun on the name Bruce Lee), attacks Kenji. Yukiji assists Kenji during Bloody New Year's Eve and, following his disappearance, becomes Kanna's guardian per his wishes.
Kanna Endo (遠藤 カンナ, Endō Kanna)
Kenji's niece, originally introduced at the beginning of the series as a toddler under Kenji's care when her mother disappeared. After Kenji's apparent death and the time-skip, she is the series' new protagonist. Following the events of Bloody New Year's Eve, she returns to Tokyo as a high school student. She seems to possess supernatural abilities such as ESP and weak telekinesis. Her father is revealed to be Friend, who claims her abilities to be the result of a secret medicine given to her mother before childbirth. Coupled with her charisma, Kanna makes an able leader, as she unites Tokyo's Thai and Chinese mafia organizations to save the Pope, and later assembles a faction against Friend where she is known under the moniker of "Ice Queen" (氷の女王, Kōri no Joō).
Mon-chan (モンちゃん)
A childhood friend of Kenji's whose real name is Masaaki Shimon (子門 真明, Shimon Masaaki). He moved to Germany and became a rugby player before retiring to take care of his ailing mother. After she dies, he started his own business with a partner. He returns to Japan to attend Donkey's funeral, and later answers Kenji's call to arms on Bloody New Year's Eve. Mon-chan survives the event, but prior to this, he was diagnosed with a terminal illness. He is later seen hospitalized in 2002 due to his disease, showing Yukiji the information he has collected while investigating the Friends. Mon-chan suddenly leaves the hospital with no warning and disappears, which is later revealed to have been to contact Sadakiyo in an attempt to investigate further, not knowing Sadakiyo's involvement in the group. Sadakiyo kills him on behalf of the Friends, taking the information he has gathered.
Donkey (ドンキー, Donkī)
A member of Kenji's childhood group of friends who is killed at the beginning of the series. His real name was Saburo Kido (木戸 三郎, Kido Saburō), and as a child, he grew up in a poor family with many siblings. Initially, Kenji and the others made fun of Donkey, but later befriended him. Obsessed with science and always thinking in a logical manner, he later went on to become a science teacher at a technical high school. After discovering that his student, Masao Tamura, had joined the "Friend" cult, he began to investigate them, but was pushed off the roof of his school during a confrontation with Masao and another member of the group. Donkey's death, which was originally ruled a suicide, is the event that reunites the members of Kenji's group and what kicks off the beginning of the story.
Keroyon (ケロヨン)
Kenji's childhood friend, whose nickname comes from the Japanese word for the sound a frog makes due to his frog-like features. Terrified by the events his friends had become embroiled in, he ignored Kenji's call to action on Bloody New Year's Eve and chose to escape as far as possible from Japan. 15 years later, feeling guilty traveling America in a soba food truck, he discovers that Kanna's mother has gone there to try to manufacture the vaccine for the outbreak of 2015 and saves her life. But they are captured by the Friends and sent back to Japan. After being released, they form the "Frogdoom" commune in Higashimurayama, Tokyo.
In the live-action film series, his full name is given as Keitaro Fukuda (福田 啓太郎, Fukuda Keitarō).
Konchi (コンチ)
A childhood friend of Kenji's whose real name is Yuichi Konno (今野 裕一, Konno Yūichi). After elementary school, his family moved to Hokkaido and he lost touch with Kenji. Like Keroyon, he chose to ignore Kenji's call to action on Bloody New Year's Eve and regrets doing so. In 3FE, Konchi acts as a disc jockey at a Hokkaido radio station, continuously playing Kenji's song over the airwaves.

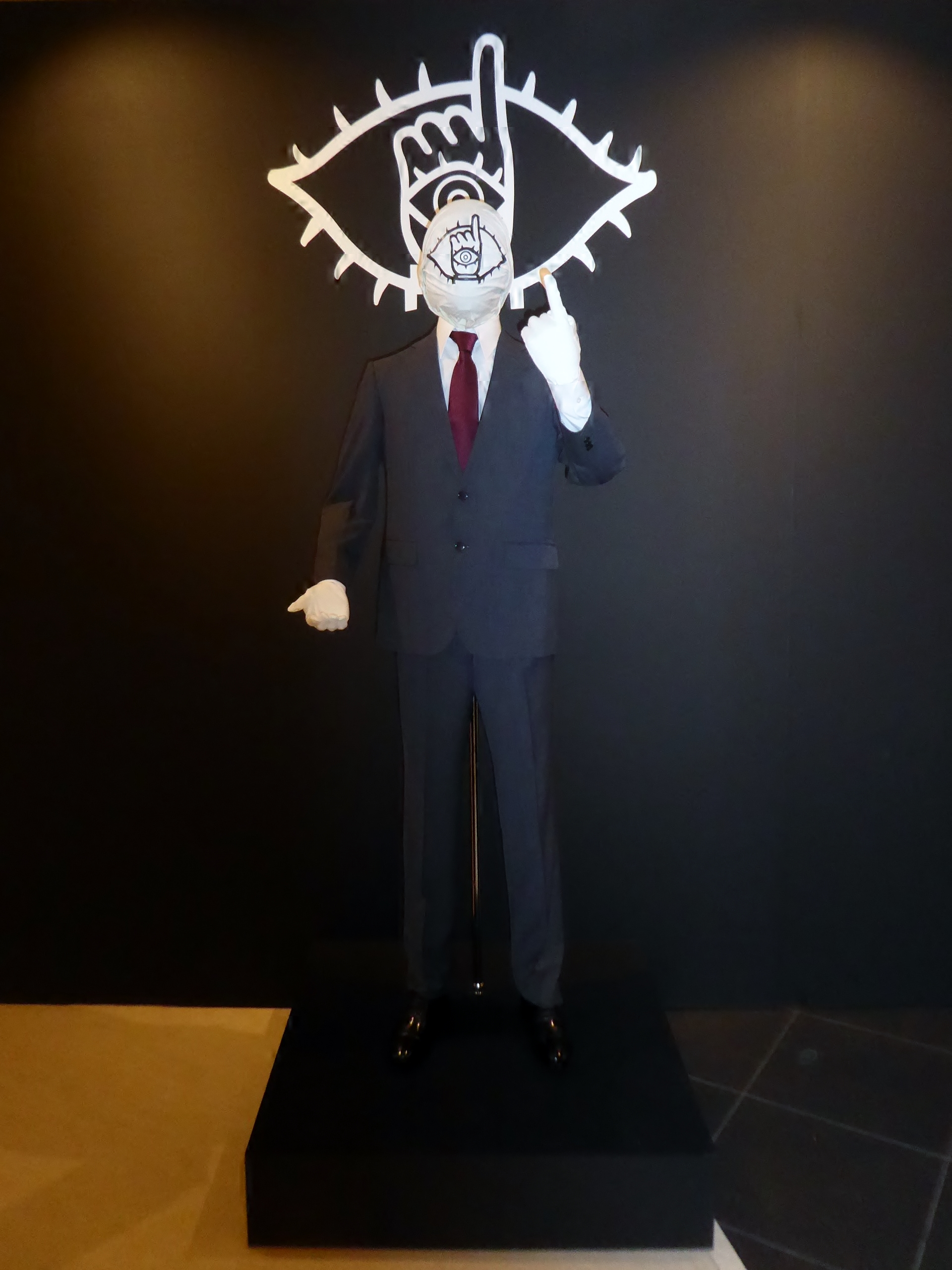
A mannequin dressed as Friend

Friend (ともだち, Tomodachi)
The main antagonist of the series. An enigmatic cult leader who uses the symbol Kenji and his friends created in the 1970s. By 1997, his followers have filled venues such as the Budokan. One of his secret goals is to take over the world. Friend's face is hidden in shadow or by a mask throughout the series. His true identity is one of the driving mysteries of the series. By the year 2000, the Friendship Democratic Party (FDP) is established as a political group with government representatives such as Manjome Inshu. Over the course of the series, two people assume the identity of Friend: Fukubei, who is one of Kenji's schoolmates, initially appears to be one of Kenji's allies, and Katsumata, another of Kenji's schoolmates, the latter of whom actually possesses special powers. In the kanzenban edition of the series, which has a different ending, Kenji realizes that Fukubei died after elementary school graduation and Katsumata learned everything about him to imitate him perfectly and take on his identity as a child, meaning Katsumata was Friend throughout the entire series.
Inshu Manjome (万丈目 胤舟, Manjōme Inshū)
A junk-peddling con artist allied with Friend who becomes one of the Friendship Democratic Party leaders. His real name is Junichiro Manjome (万丈目 淳一朗, Manjōme Jun'ichirō). He originally met the boys in the early 1970s when selling knick-knacks such as space food and spoons, claiming them to be cutting edge modern innovations from NASA. Upon discovering that Fukubei had a spoon bending talent, he recruited him for a TV show in 1972, but the two were labelled frauds. In 1980, the financially struggling Manjome was recruited by Fukubei to aid him in creating "Friend". In 3FE, after Friend reveals to him his intention to destroy humanity and that he is not Fukubei, Manjome asks Kanna and Otcho to kill Friend. Manjome is killed by Takasu while playing the virtual reality game created for Friend Land.
Kamisama (神様, Kamisama; lit. 'God')
Kyutaro Kaminaga (神永 球太郎, Kaminaga Kyūtarō) is a homeless old man nicknamed "Kamisama"; shortening his surname to "Kami" forms the Japanese word for god, which is emphasized when the honorific suffix -sama is added. He is bent on the return of ten-pin bowling as a major sport in Japan and has the power of foresight, being able to see what will happen before it comes to pass. Kamisama and his friend lure Kenji out to the riverbank where he warns Kenji about saving the future. He is revealed to be the businessman who unknowingly evicted Kenji and the gang from their secret base in order to build a bowling alley. Later in the series, Kamisama has become extremely rich by using his foresight to play the stock market, and becomes the first Japanese civilian to travel into space.
Kyoko Koizumi (小泉 響子, Koizumi Kyōko)
In 2014, Kyoko is an airheaded teenage girl that attends the same high school as Kanna. For a history assignment, she impulsively picks Bloody New Year's Eve, but when she starts doing research, she meets Kamisama and learns the truth of what happened that night. She is suddenly recruited to participate in Friend Land where she must abide by the Friend cult activities or risk being sent to Friend World to suffer a worse fate. Kyoko struggles with her survival until she meets Yoshitsune, who helps her get through the exams, the most notable of which is a virtual reality game where she meets Kenji and his classmates in the 1970s, in exchange for uncovering more information on the identity of Friend. In 3FE, Kyoko discovers that she has a talent for bowling and is forced by Kamisama into playing the sport.
Fukubei (フクベエ, Fukubē)
Fukubei is a schoolmate of Kenji. His nickname comes from an incorrect reading of the kanji in his real name, Hattori (服部). Due to this, he is frequently seen wearing a mask of the titular character of the manga series Ninja Hattori-kun, both as a child and when acting as Friend. In 1972, he was recruited by Manjome to show his spoon bending talent on TV, but the two were labelled frauds and Fukubei vowed to have revenge by conquering the world and destroying humanity. He begins to enact his plan for revenge in 1980 when he reunites with Manjome and creates "Friend". While helping Kenji on Bloody New Year's Eve, Fukubei appears to die by falling off a building while unmasking a guy who appears to be Friend controlling the giant robot. But he later reveals himself to Kenji as the true identity of Friend, Kanna's biological father and an extremely unbalanced man who nurtured a pathological envy of Kenji since their childhood and delusions of grandeur. A megalomaniac primarily motivated by a desire to live out childish fantasies of being recognized as a hero and to take revenge on the world for not recognizing his exceptionalism, Fukubei is an charismatic leader who explores people's need to believe in something greater than themselves in order to fake a series of supernatural powers (in reality, only stage magic tricks) and pose as a superhuman prophet. He seduced Kanna's mother in order to enlist her help in developing vaccines for the viruses he has Yamane create. Fukubei is shot dead by Yamane in the middle of the series on New Years Day 2015. In the kanzenban edition of the series, which has a different ending, Kenji realizes that Fukubei died after elementary school graduation and Katsumata learned everything about him to imitate him perfectly and take on his identity as a child.
In the live-action film series, his full name is given as Tetsuya Hattori (服部 哲也, Hattori Tetsuya).
Sadakiyo (サダキヨ)
Kenji's classmate who was not part of the original gang. His real name is Kiyoshi Sada (佐田 清志, Sada Kiyoshi). Although bullied a lot in elementary school, he often wore an alien-like mask and left after only a semester, thus his face remains unknown to most of the gang. However, Fukubei accepted Sadakiyo's request to be his friend. As an adult, he is a member of the Friends and is the caretaker of Friend's replica childhood home. After killing Mon-chan in 2002 and watching Kanna stand up against them, Sadakiyo began to question if following Friend was the right thing to do. In 2014, he becomes Kyoko's English teacher and takes her to Friend's home, where he ends up betraying the Friends, burning the home, and taking Kyoko to meet his old teacher. There, Sadakiyo gives Kanna and company the info Mon-chan gathered on Friend before seemingly dying in a fiery car crash while the others escape. He reappears in 3FE with his mask on and stops the new Friend from killing Kanna. In the live-action film, he stays in the home as it burns.
Yamane (ヤマネ)
Kenji's classmate and friend of Fukubei and Sadakiyo. He became a bacteriologist that worked with Kiriko for the Friends. He was responsible for developing the deadly viruses that are unleashed by Friend, while Kiriko was tasked with developing their vaccines. Yamane left the Friends in 2003 after Kiriko enlightened him on what their research was being used for, but only after he had already created an even more potent form of the virus. Although he tried to hide, Yamane receives a message from Friend to meet on New Years Day 2015. Realizing that he can not escape and expecting to be killed, Yamane goes to the meeting and shoots Fukubei, before being killed by the Friends immediately after.
In the live-action film series, his full name is given as Akio Yamane (山根 昭夫, Yamane Akio).
Mitsuyo Takasu (高須 光代, Takasu Mitsuyo)
In 2014, Takasu is a Dream Navigator in the Friend organization who keeps an eye on Kyoko both at Friend Land and after she leaves. She rises towards the top of the Friends, originally as Manjome's mistress, but later as General Secretary after killing Manjome in 3FE. She becomes pregnant by Friend, hoping to take over the "Holy Mother" role from Kiriko.
Shohei Chono (蝶野 将平, Chōno Shōhei)
In 2014, Chono is a young detective in the Kabuki-cho police and the grandson of a legendary detective nicknamed "Cho-san". While investigating a murder, Chono meets the cop-hating Kanna and slowly begins to believe that it was committed by a cop who is involved in a plot to assassinate the Pope. When Chono reports his findings to NPA director-general Yamazaki, who is his grandfather's former partner, the same murdering cop attempts to kill him, proving his report was leaked and that the corruption reaches high into the police force ranks. In 3FE, Chono has been transferred to watching a northern border checkpoint, where he meets Kenji, whom he starts to follow back to Tokyo after immediately recognizing him as the singer on Kanna's cassettes. Chono arrests Yamazaki and, in 21st Century Boys, is chief of the United Nations' investigation into the Friend cult.
Kiriko Endo (遠藤 貴理子, Endō Kiriko)
Kenji's older sister and Kanna's mother. After her boyfriend was mysteriously murdered, Kiriko (キリコ) is seduced by Fukubei into marrying him and joining Friend's research group. She becomes a virologist tasked with creating vaccines to the viruses that her colleague Yamane creates. After learning of Fukubei's role as Friend, Kiriko abandoned Kanna into the care of Kenji and her mother and tries to get the police to stop the cult, but has no success before Bloody New Year's Eve happens. Realizing that her research resulted in the deaths of 150,000 people, she embarks on a quest to mitigate the damage of her earlier unwitting involvement. In 2015, she travels to Germany and America handing out vaccines to that year's virus. She and Keroyon are captured by the Friends and sent back to Japan to fulfill the "Holy Mother" prophecy. After being released, they form a commune in Higashimurayama, where Kiriko develops the vaccine for the events of 3FE.
Katsumata (カツマタ)
The man who usurps Fukubei's place as Friend is revealed in the last chapter of 21st Century Boys to be Katsumata. A friend of Fukubei's who often wore a double of the same mask Sadakiyo wore, Katsumata harbors a deep hatred of Kenji for stealing a prize from a candy shop in their childhood and letting Katsumata take the blame for it. This incident leaves Katsumata "dead": a social pariah, his very existence unacknowledged by his schoolmates. A rumor spread that Katsumata died the day before a fish dissection at school. Since Katsumata had really been looking forward to this, a rumor that his ghost was seen carrying out the dissection in the science room that night was told amongst the kids. Unlike Fukubei, who only pretends to have paranormal powers, the second Friend seems to have actual precognitive powers that have allowed him to see the future since he was a child. Also unlike Fukubei, who dreamed of conquering the world so his need for attention could be fed by the praise of others, Katsumata wishes to destroy the entire planet after deeming the world unnecessary. Immediately following Fukubei's death in 2015, Katsumata assumes not only the Friend identity, but had plastic surgery to look identical to Fukubei. Katsumata is killed during the final confrontation with Kenji at his old school when Sadakiyo holds him at knife point to stop him from crushing Kanna with the robot, and one of the flying saucers crashes on him. In the kanzenban edition of the series, which has a different ending, Kenji realizes that Fukubei died after elementary school graduation and Katsumata learned everything about him to imitate him perfectly and take on his identity as a child, meaning Katsumata was Friend throughout the entire series.
In the live-action film series, his full name is given as Tadanobu Katsumata (勝俣 忠信, Katsumata Tadanobu).

== Production ==
On the day he gave his editor the manuscript for the final chapter of Happy!, Naoki Urasawa was relaxing in the bath when he heard a speech on television by someone from the United Nations say "Without them, we would not have been able to reach the 21st Century..." and wondered "Who's 'them'? Who are those people?" Envisioning "them" appearing to a cheering crowd in his head, he came up with the title 20th Century Boys and then the T. Rex song "20th Century Boy" began to play in his head. Having been planning to take a break from weekly serialization after consecutively creating Yawara! and Happy! with that schedule, Urasawa said he was not looking forward to drawing, but "had" to fax the new idea to the editorial department at Big Comic Spirits since it had come to him. He also felt the need to get started on the series right away since it was around 1998 and the end of the century was approaching.

Although he creates a "movie trailer" in his head when starting a new series, Urasawa does not plan the story out in advance. For example, a young woman appears in the first chapter pulling a curtain open to reveal a giant robot (as envisioned in the trailer). While writing that scene Urasawa could hear a baby crying in the convenience store next door and included that in the manga, thus it cuts to 1997 with Kenji and a crying baby Kanna in a convenience store. The author did not initially know that Kanna would grow into that young woman.

When asked if scenes in 20th Century Boys reflect his own childhood experiences, Urasawa said about 1/10 did. He also explained that the spoon bending seen in the series was based on Uri Geller. A few weeks before the September 11 attacks, Urasawa turned in a manuscript for 20th Century Boys where two giant robots fight and destroy buildings in Shinjuku. But after the attacks, the artist could not bring himself to illustrate that scene and created a chapter almost entirely devoted to Kenji singing a song, in order to express how he felt. When Urasawa began 20th Century Boys in 1999, he was already writing Monster semimonthly and continued to serialize both at the same time. Although he was briefly hospitalized for exhaustion at this point, Monster ended in 2001 and Urasawa began writing another series simultaneous to 20th Century Boys in 2003 with Pluto. While working on 20th Century Boys, Urasawa injured his shoulder to the point he could not draw, and even considered retiring as a result.

== Themes ==
Expo '70 is a crucial element of the films' plot. The films use Expo '70 as a symbol of the financial prosperity of Shōwa era Japan, and the depiction of Expo '70 in the films is an example of Shōwa nostalgia.

== Media ==
=== Manga ===
Written and illustrated by Naoki Urasawa, 20th Century Boys was originally serialized in Shogakukan's seinen manga magazine Big Comic Spirits from October 4, 1999, (Note: It started in the magazine's 44th issue of 1999, released on October 4 of that same year.) to April 24, 2006. (Note: It finished in the magazine's combined 21st–22nd issue of 2006, released on April 24 of that same year.) The 249 individual chapters were published into 22 tankōbon volumes by Shogakukan from January 29, 2000, to November 30, 2006. Takashi Nagasaki is credited as "co-producer" of the manga's story. A sequel that concludes the story, titled 21st Century Boys (21世紀少年, Nijūisseiki Shōnen), was serialized in the same magazine from December 25, 2006, (Note: It started (firstly announced just as the final chapter of 20th Century Boys) in the magazine's combined 4th–5th issue of 2007, released on December 25, 2006.) to July 14, 2007; the 16 chapters were released into two volumes on May 30 and September 28, 2007. 20th Century Boys received an eleven-volume kanzenban re-release between January 29 and November 30, 2016. The single kanzenban reprint of 21st Century Boys, released on December 28, 2016, includes a new ending. A one-shot manga titled Aozora Chu-Ihō ("Blue Sky Advisory – Kiss") was published in the February 2009 issue of Big Comic Spirits, it was credited to "Ujiko-Ujio", the pen-name of the fictional manga creator duo Kaneko and Ujiki in 20th Century Boys.

Both 20th Century Boys and 21st Century Boys were licensed for English-language release in North America by Viz Media in 2005, however their release was delayed until after their translation of Monster had finished. The first English-language volume of 20th Century Boys was released on February 17, 2009, and the last of 21st Century Boys on March 19, 2013. It had been reported that the reason for the delay was at the request of Urasawa, who felt there was a change in his art style over time. However, when asked about it being due to his request in 2012, Urasawa was surprised saying that he did not know about that and simply suggested Viz did not know which order to publish the two series. In 2017, Viz licensed the kanzenban editions of both 20th Century Boys and 21st Century Boys. The first volume of 20th Century Boys: The Perfect Edition was published on September 18, 2018, and the single volume 21st Century Boys: The Perfect Edition was published on June 15, 2021. Viz's initial release was distributed in Australasia by Madman Entertainment.

=== Live-action films ===
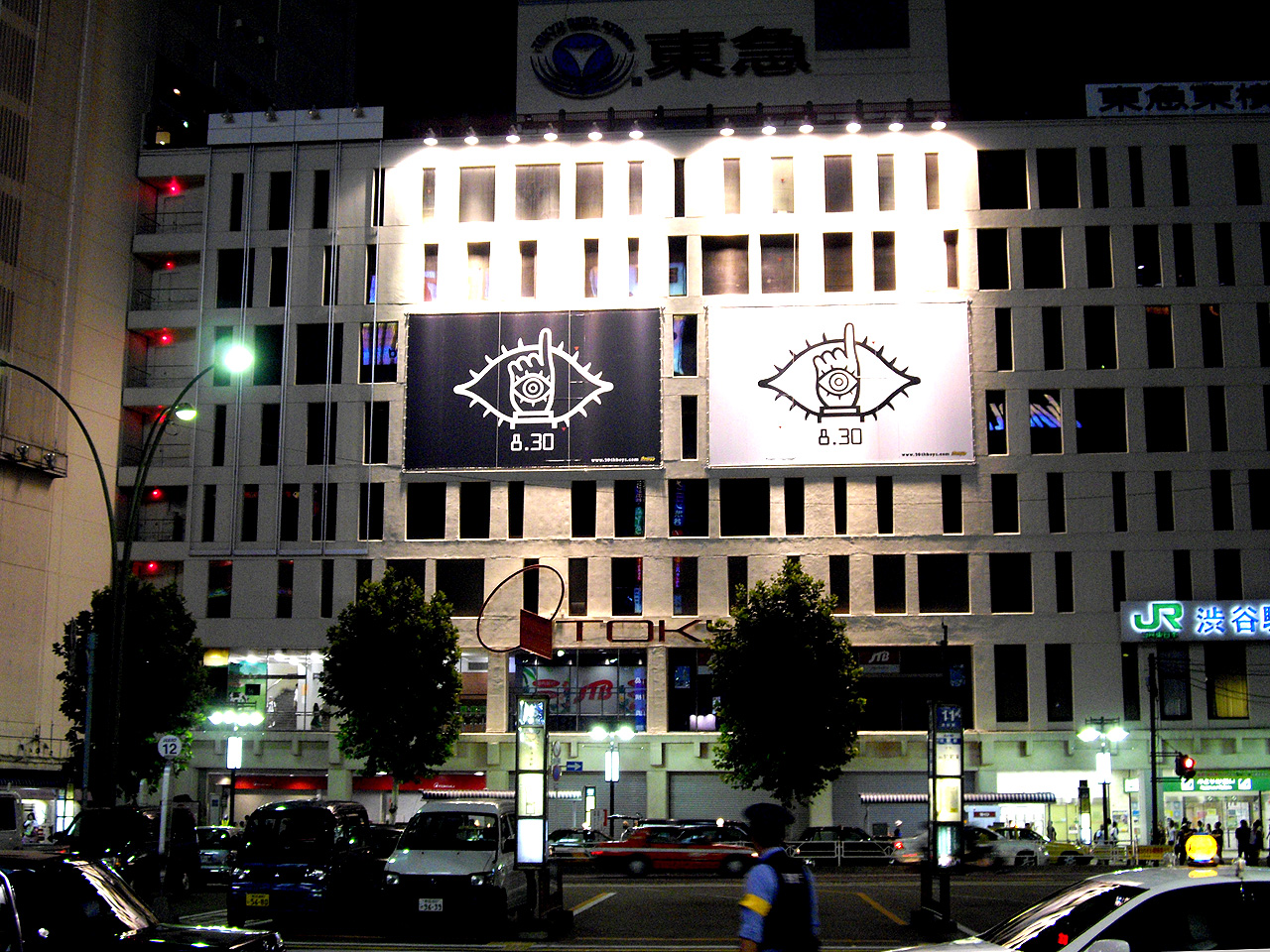
Billboards in Shibuya advertising the first film, featuring the symbol of the character Friend

The trilogy of 20th Century Boys live-action films, directed by Yukihiko Tsutsumi, were first announced in 2006. In February 2008, the main cast was announced, as well as the trilogy's budget of 6 billion yen (approx. $60 million US) and that Urasawa will contribute to the script. Filming of the first two movies was planned from January 3 to the end of June, and of the third from mid-August to the end of October. English rock band T. Rex's "20th Century Boy", the song from which the series gets its name, was used as the theme song to the films.

The first movie's premiere was held in Paris on August 19, 2008, at the Publicis Champs-Elysées cinema with a press conference at the Louvre Museum, which was attended by Toshiaki Karasawa (Kenji) and Takako Tokiwa (Yukiji). The first film was released on August 30, 2008, the second on January 31, 2009, and the third was released on August 29, 2009. The first movie covers volumes 1 to 5 of the manga, and the second covers volumes 6 to 15, but differs from the original story on some key points; important characters missing in the first movie were introduced in the second. The final film in the trilogy covers the remainder of the volumes, but with several changes to the main story.

==== Cast ====
- Toshiaki Karasawa as Kenji Endo
- Etsushi Toyokawa as Choji "Otcho" Ochiai
- Takako Tokiwa as Yukiji Setoguchi
- Airi Taira as Kanna Endo
- Teruyuki Kagawa as Tsuyoshi Yoshitsune
- Takashi Ukaji as Shimon "Mon-chan" Masaaki
- Hiroyuki Miyasako as Keitaro "Keroyon" Fukuda
- Kuranosuke Sasaki as Tetsuya "Fukubei" Hattori
- Renji Ishibashi as Inshu Manjome
- Yūsuke Santamaria as Sada "Sadakiyo" Kiyoshi
- Katsuo Nakamura as Kyutaro "Kami-sama" Kaminaga
- Hitomi Kuroki as Kiriko Endō
- Tomiko Ishii as Chiyo Endo
- Haruka Kinami as Kyoko Koizumi
- Arata Iura as Masao Tamura / Number 13
- Naohito Fujiki as Detective Shohei Chono
- Kanji Tsuda as Dan Moroboshi
- Kazuko Yoshiyuki as Mrs. Moroboshi
- Arata Furuta as Namio Haru
- Koichi Yamadera as Yuichi "Konchi" Konno
- Yoriko Douguchi as Mitsuko Kido (Donkey's wife)
- Kenichi Endō as Bleeding man
- Jiro Sato as Mole policeman
- Fumiya Fujii as Masato Ikegami
- Takashi Fujii as Friendship party promotor
- Chizuru Ikewaki as Erika (Kingmart cashier)
- Nana Katase as Mika Shikishima
- Ken Mitsuishi as Detective Yama-san
- Mirai Moriyama as Kakuda (Manga artist)
- Katsuhisa Namase as Saburo "Donkey" Kido
- Naoto Takenaka as Pierre Ichimonji
- Fumiyo Kohinata as Akio Yamane
- Shirō Sano as Yanbo / Mabo (Twins)
- Raita Ryū as Detective Chosuke "Cho-san" Igarashi
- Yōji Tanaka as Detective Higashino
- Yū Tokui as Kingmart supervisor
- Masahiko Nishimura as Seven Dragon shopkeeper
- Kazuhiko Nishimura as Detective Saki
- Eiko Koike as Takasu
- Ryūnosuke Kamiki as Tadanobu Katsumata
- Naoko Ken as Jijibaba
- Yukihiro Takahashi as Billy
- Chen Chao-jung as Chinese mafia boss
- Samat Sangsangium as Thai mafia boss
- Naomasa Musaka as Father Nitani
- Mansaku Fuwa as Homeless man
- Toshikazu Fukawa as Nobuo
- Tamotsu Ishibashi as Kenji's former classmate
- Hidehiko Ishizuka as Michihiro Maruo
- Miyako Takeuchi as Setsuko Ichihara
- Hanako Yamada as Friendship party promotor
- Kōmoto Masahiro as Teacher

==== Home video ====
The first film in the trilogy is available on DVD and Blu-ray in Japan from VAP, and in Hong Kong from Kam & Ronson. A UK DVD release was announced by label 4Digital Asia, and released on May 4, 2009. On the same day, Part 2 received its UK theatrical premiere at the 8th Sci-Fi-London annual fantastic film festival. Part 3 received its UK theatrical premiere on May 7, 2010, at the Prince Charles Cinema in London as part of the 2nd Terracotta Film Festival. Following this, 4Digital Asia released a 4-disc boxset containing the complete trilogy on May 31, 2010. Viz Media licensed the trilogy for North American release. The first film had its US theatrical premiere at the New People opening in San Francisco on August 15, 2009. The second film premiere followed at the same cinema on August 21, 2009, and the third film premiere followed on the same day as the Japanese premiere on August 28, 2009. Part 1 received its US DVD release on December 11, 2009. A launch event was held at the New People cinema in San Francisco with a theatrical screening. Part 2's DVD release had a similar launch event on February 9, 2010, with a one-night-only theatrical screening. Likewise, Part 3 had a launch event and theatrical screening at New People on May 20, 2010.

== Reception ==
=== Manga ===
20th Century Boys has 26.4 million copies in circulation; it was the third top-selling manga series of 2008 in Japan; and the ninth top-selling of 2009. The series has also won numerous awards, including the 2001 Kodansha Manga Award in the General category, an Excellence Prize at the 2002 Japan Media Arts Festival, the 2003 Shogakukan Manga Award in the General category, and the first ever Angoulême International Comics Festival Prize for a Series in 2004. It also won the Grand Prize at the 37th Japan Cartoonists Association Awards, and the Seiun Award in the Comic category at the 46th Japan Science Fiction Convention, both in 2008. The series won the 2011 Eisner Award for Best U.S. Edition of International Material in the Asia category for Viz Media's English releases, and won the same award again in 2013. Fans in the United Kingdom voted it Favourite New Manga at the 2012 Eagle Awards. 20th Century Boys was nominated twice, 2010 and 2013, for the Harvey Award in the Best American Edition of Foreign Material category, and three years in a row, 2010–2012, for the Eisner Award for Best Continuing Series.

Manga critic Jason Thompson called 20th Century Boys "an epic saga of nostalgia, middle age, rock n' roll, and a struggle against an evil conspiracy." He compared the story to several novels by Stephen King, such as It, where "a group of childhood friends who reunite as adults to deal with leftover issues from their childhood manifested in monstrous form." Thompson wrote that despite being a manga aimed at a male audience, the series gained fans of all ages for its great premise, storytelling and the mystery behind Friend. In addition to King's It, Thompson and Tom Speelman of Polygon both suggested that the Aum Shinrikyo doomsday cult also served as an inspiration on the manga.

Anime News Network's Carlo Santos felt the pacing of the series is very well written, and praised the intricate and interconnecting plot and its twists, as well as the well-developed characters. He also noted Urasawa's art and dialogue, saying "it takes real skill to build a story as multi-layered as this one and still have it make sense as the characters explain things". Including it on a list of "10 Essential Manga That Should Belong in Every Comic Collection", Matthew Meylikhov of Paste praised the cast as one of "the most expansive and diverse" in any manga and how Urasawa makes each character independently recognizable as they age through the decades. "20th Century Boys becomes an experience featuring horror, science fiction, post-apocalyptic futures, wild humor, epic landscapes, and more as an apex accomplishment in manga."

=== Films ===
20th Century Boys was adapted into three films. The first live-action film debuted at number two at the box office, grossing 625.61 million yen (approx. $5.78 million US), and rose to number one the second week. The second film debuted at number one, grossing approximately $6,955,472 US. The third film followed also debuting at number one, and earned approximately $22,893,123 US by its second week.

Writing for Empire, Justin Bowyer gave the first film a three out of five rating. He praised the action and faithfulness to the original manga, but stated that those unfamiliar with the source material may find the large cast of characters and complex story confusing. Bowyer also suggested waiting for all three films to be released. A fan of the manga, Jamie S. Rich of DVD Talk felt too much had to be cut to fit three films, with the development of characters suffering as a result. He did comment on how close the actors looked to their comic book counterparts and ultimately recommended the film. In an opposite view, both The Guardian's Cath Clarke and Time Out London's Trevor Johnston gave the first film two out of five stars and cited the faithfulness to the manga as a negative, feeling that some of the material could have been cut. Charles Webb of Twitch Film voiced similar criticism in a review of the second film. However, he praised the character Friend and Etsushi Toyokawa's performance as Occho, as well as the ending that makes the viewer anticipate the final installment in the trilogy. Jamie S. Rich also felt that the second movie "more than fulfills its prime directive of enticing me to stick around" for the final film. On the third film, Burl Burlingame of the Honolulu Star-Bulletin wrote, "The steam seems to have run out of the franchise during this third part, and it's simply an OK capper to the series", but praised the special effects. Variety's Russell Edwards also cited the special effects in the final installment as the best in the trilogy.
