= Eggplant emoji =

Emoji icon

The eggplant emoji as it appears on Twitter.

The eggplant emoji (U+1F346 🍆 AUBERGINE), also known in English, French and its Unicode name as aubergine, is an emoji featuring a purple eggplant. Social media users have noted the emoji's phallic appearance and often use it as a euphemistic or suggestive icon during sexting conversations in order to represent a penis or vagina. It is frequently paired and often contrasted with the peach emoji (🍑), which is often used when representing the buttocks (or female genitals).

== Development and usage history ==
The eggplant emoji was originally included in proprietary emoji sets from SoftBank Mobile and au by KDDI. When Apple released the first iPhone in 2007, there was an emoji keyboard intended for Japanese users only, which encoded them using SoftBank's Private Use Area scheme. However, after iPhone users in the United States discovered that downloading Japanese apps allowed access to the keyboard, pressure grew to expand the availability of the emoji keyboard beyond Japan.

As part of a set of characters sourced from SoftBank, au by KDDI, and NTT Docomo emoji sets, the eggplant emoji was approved as part of Unicode 6.0 in 2010 under the name "Aubergine". In 2011, Apple made the emoji keyboard a standard iOS feature worldwide. Global popularity of emojis then surged in the early- to mid-2010s. The eggplant emoji has been included in the Unicode Technical Standard for emoji (UTS #51) since its first edition (Emoji 1.0) in 2015.

Character information
Preview	🍆	
Unicode name	AUBERGINE	
Encodings	decimal	hex
Unicode	127814	U+1F346
UTF-8	240 159 141 134	F0 9F 8D 86
UTF-16	55356 57158	D83C DF46
GB 18030	148 57 182 56	94 39 B6 38
Numeric character reference	&#127814;	&#x1F346;
Shift JIS (au by KDDI)	243 144	F3 90
Shift JIS (SoftBank 3G)	249 234	F9 EA
7-bit JIS (au by KDDI)	121 112	79 70
Emoji shortcode	:eggplant:	
Google name (pre-Unicode)	EGGPLANT	
CLDR text-to-speech name	eggplant	
Google substitute string	[ナス]	

== Popularity on social media and cultural impact ==
The "aubergine" or "eggplant" emoji is commonly used to represent a penis in sexting conversations, particularly in the United States, and in Canada. In line with the eggplant emoji's common usage in sexual contexts, Emojipedia noted that the emoji is popularly paired with the peach emoji (🍑), which is often used to represent buttocks or female genitalia.

It has been speculated that the first instance of the eggplant emoji being linked to a penis is its use in the reality show Susunu! Denpa Shōnen to cover the genitals of a contestant nicknamed "Nasubi", which means "eggplant" in Japanese. Nasubi was featured on the show for 15 months from 1998 to 1999, naked the entire time, with only an eggplant emoji covering his genitals. On Twitter, the emoji was used as a reference to a penis as early as 2011. By the mid-2010s, online magazine outlets wrote about how the emoji's usage in sexual contexts morphed society's connotations of the eggplant "from an innocuous vegetable to America's favorite shorthand for a throbbing cock." Slate writer Amanda Hess stated that "the eggplant has risen to become America's dominant phallic fruit." Writing for Cosmopolitan, Kathryn Lindsay stated that "this simple, previously neglected vegetable rocketed into stardom in a matter of years, thanks to our collective decision to deem it the universal symbol for dick."

In 2018, Dictionary.com became the first major reference to add explanations for emojis, although these explanations are only included on the editorial section of the website.

The eggplant emoji has been referenced by popular culture numerous times. In 2017, Netflix won a bidding war to distribute a film titled The Eggplant Emoji. The film was ultimately renamed The Package. In 2019, the cosmetics retailer Lush sold bath bombs resembling the eggplant emoji for Valentine's Day. The company expanded their eggplant and peach emoji-themed product line the following year.

== Reception ==
As early as 2013, online media outlets have commented on the eggplant emoji's resemblance to a penis, with Complex listing it as one of "10 emojis to send while sexting."

In April 2015, Instagram released a feature allowing users to hashtag emojis. Shortly after, the platform banned the hashtag "🍆", as well as any references to "eggplant" from its search function. Later in 2019, Facebook and Instagram both banned using the eggplant or peach emojis alongside "sexual statements about being horny."

In 2016, the eggplant emoji's widespread usage as sexual innuendo led the American Dialect Society to vote it as the "Most Notable Emoji" of 2015.
