= School-Live! =

Japanese manga series and its adaptations

- First tankōbon volume cover, featuring Yuki Takeya

がっこうぐらし! (Gakkō Gurashi!)
- Genre: Horror; Psychological thriller; Slice of life
- Manga
- Written by: Norimitsu Kaihō
- Illustrated by: Sadoru Chiba
- Published by: Houbunsha
- English publisher: NA: Yen Press
- Magazine: Manga Time Kirara Forward
- Original run: May 24, 2012 – November 22, 2019
- Volumes: 12
- Anime television series
- Directed by: Masaomi Andō
- Produced by: Kei Fukura; Asuka Yamazaki; Takema Okamura; Satoshi Fukao; Toshiyasu Hayashi; Yūki Muramatsu; Sugi Kubota
- Written by: Norimitsu Kaihō
- Music by: Susumu Kayamori (MOSAIC.WAV)
- Studio: Lerche
- Licensed by: AUS: Madman Entertainment; JP: NBCUniversal Entertainment Japan; NA: Sentai Filmworks; UK: Animatsu Entertainment
- Original network: AT-X, Tokyo MX, Sun TV, BS11
- English network: SEA: ANIPLUS HD; Anime Network
- Original run: July 9, 2015 – September 24, 2015
- Episodes: 12
- Manga

Gakkō Gurashi! ~Otayori~
- Written by: Norimitsu Kaihō
- Illustrated by: Sadoru Chiba
- Published by: Houbunsha
- English publisher: NA: Yen Press
- Magazine: Manga Time Kirara Forward
- Original run: June 24, 2020 – August 24, 2021
- Volumes: 1
- Live-action film
- School-Live! (2019)

School-Live! (Japanese: がっこうぐらし!, Hepburn: Gakkō Gurashi!; lit. "Living at School!") is a Japanese manga series written by Norimitsu Kaihō and illustrated by Sadoru Chiba. The series was serialized from May 2012 to November 2019 in the Houbunsha's Manga Time Kirara Forward magazine and is licensed in English by Yen Press.

An anime adaptation by Lerche aired between July and September 2015. A live-action film adaptation was released in January 2019.

== Premise ==
Yuki Takeya is a cheerful school girl who, along with her friends Kurumi Ebisuzawa, Yūri Wakasa, and Miki Naoki, is a member of the Megurigaoka Private High School's School Living Club (巡ヶ丘学院高等学校 学園生活部, Megurigaoka Gakuin Kōtō Gakkō Gakuen Seikatsu-bu). As Yuki seeks out fun school activities every day while living at school, the other girls work to keep her safe, as in reality, they are the sole survivors of their school after a zombie outbreak overruns the city, and a traumatized Yuki has repressed her memories to live in a delusion where the outbreak never happened.

== Characters ==
=== School Living Club ===
The main characters of the series are a small club of girls who prioritize being able to live within the school building.

Yuki Takeya (丈槍 由紀, Takeya Yuki)
Voiced by: Inori Minase (Japanese); Brittney Karbowski (English)
Live action portrayal: Midori Nagatsuki
A bright and cheerful girl who is always excited to try new and exciting club activities. As a result of a mental breakdown due to the zombie outbreak, Yuki has created an idealized delusion for herself, believing that everything is normal and her classmates and teachers are alive and well. Slowly, she realizes the truth of her surroundings but still acts oblivious, though she will panic on occasions when her delusion breaks down and she sees reality for what it is. Since leaving the school, Yuki has slowly been coming to terms with reality and has tried to be of more use to the group.
Kurumi Ebisuzawa (恵飛須沢 胡桃, Ebisuzawa Kurumi)
Voiced by: Ari Ozawa (Japanese); Juliet Simmons (English)
Live action portrayal: Nanami Abe
A twin-tailed girl of the School Living Club, who is often sent out on the more dangerous missions. She carries a shovel around with her at all times in case of zombie encounters. She was formerly in love with an unnamed upperclassman, but when the zombie outbreak occurred, her crush was bitten and attacked her. She then used a shovel to kill him, and it has since been her weapon of choice. After she becomes infected by being bitten on the right arm by the zombified Megumi, she is seemingly cured by an antidote. However, her body remains cold and she is ignored by other zombies, suggesting that the antidote didn't work properly. In later manga chapters, she begins to display zombie-like behavior though she still manages to retain her sense of self. In the film adaptation she is the main character of the film.
Yuuri Wakasa (若狭 悠里, Wakasa Yūri)
Voiced by: M.A.O (Japanese); Luci Christian (English)
Live action portrayal: Wakana Majima
The president of the School Living Club, nicknamed "Rii-san" (りーさん). She is the one who manages everything the club has. Even though she acts as a strong girl and big sister for the other members, she is extremely mentally fragile, growing more unstable as the stakes get higher. She has a younger sister named Ruu, who she believes she has rescued from an elementary school but is later revealed to be Yuki's stuffed teddy bear.
Miki Naoki (直樹 美紀, Naoki Miki)
Voiced by: Rie Takahashi (Japanese); Cynthia Martinez (English)
Live action portrayal: Rio Kiyohara
A blonde-haired girl who is a year below the other girls and is nicknamed "Mii-kun" (みーくん) by Yuki, much to her dismay. She was rescued by the School Living Club while they were scouting a shopping mall, where she had been living since the outbreak. She initially dislikes the way Kurumi and Yuuri play along with Yuki's delusions, but later comes to understand how she helps them. She also becomes kind and soft, opening her true self to other members, and is especially close to both Yuki and Kurumi. She refers to Yuki as her senpai. In the film adaptation, she has experience of combatting zombies, therefore she is also sent along with Kurumi to more dangerous missions. Her main weapon is nail picker, being given by Kurumi.
Megumi Sakura (佐倉 慈, Sakura Megumi)
Voiced by: Ai Kayano (Japanese); Stephanie Wittels (English)
Live action portrayal: Nonoka Ono
A teacher and the advisor for the School Living Club who is affectionately called "Megu-nee" (めぐねえ) by her students, forming the club to protect the girls when the outbreak occurred. While initially shown to be a teacher with rather little presence, often being interrupted by the other girls, it is soon revealed that she, like the other students, is another part of Yuki's delusions. In reality, she was infected shortly after forming the School Living Club, forcing herself into a hidden part of the school before completely turning into a zombie. When she is eventually found, she ends up infecting Kurumi before being put down by Miki.
Tarōmaru (太郎丸)
Voiced by: Emiri Katō (Japanese); Tiffany Grant (English)
A Shiba Inu puppy found by Yuki and taken in as the School Living Club's mascot. However, due to him being infected, the girls were forced to abandon him outside. Due to his residual memories of the club, he still occasionally attempts to return to the clubroom. Compared to the source material, Taromaru's role is expanded in the anime adaptation, having originally been found by Miki before they were both taken in by the club, and later infected by Megumi. Although he is given the same vaccine given to Kurumi and cured of the infection itself, he is left weak from the fight and dies unable to recover.

=== Megurigaoka Private High School ===
Kei Shidō (祠堂 圭, Shidō Kei)
Voiced by: Juri Kimura (Japanese); Shanae'a Moore (English)
Miki's classmate and best friend who accompanied her when the zombie outbreak initially occurred. Forced to lock themselves in a room within a shopping mall, Kei eventually grew tired of being restricted indoors and left. When the club eventually left their school to go to college, Miki believes she saw a zombified Kei on the way out.
Akiko Kamiyama (神山 昭子, Kamiyama Akiko)
Voiced by: Ikumi Hayama (Japanese); Tiffany Grant (English)
Another teacher at Megurigaoka Private High School and one of Yuki's teachers. As a teacher, she was calm and kind; but due to Yuki often sleeping in class, she would get a little annoyed with her; though, she did not get particularly angry, and only warned her that if she continued, she would have to stay after class. However, she did get angry when Yuki's friends would interrupt her classes. She was also very caring, and before the outbreak, she seemed to be on good terms with Megumi, which was proven when she decided to spend her last moments telling Megumi about the outbreak and not to let anyone come on to the rooftop.
Takae Yuzumura (柚村 貴依, Yuzumura Takae)
Voiced by: Yuna Yoshino (Japanese); Natalie Rial (English)
A student at Megurigaoka Private High School, and she was a close friend and classmate of Yuki prior to the outbreak. She had a calm demeanor, with a punk-like atmosphere surrounding her. Takae also seemed to have quite a playful personality, throwing paper planes at Yuki with a drawing of her depicted as an angel inside. She greatly cherished Yuki and was very affectionate with her, and she was also on good terms with her other two friends. Near the end of the series, Takae (in her zombie form) was "listening" when Yuki spoke from the broadcasting room as she told the students who were still at the school that classes were over and that they could go home.

=== St. Isidore University ===
A university in the same town area as the School-Live club. It is one of the several designated facilities in the town with survival rations, solar panels, and an evacuation shelter. Following the outbreak, the surviving students at the school became divided, with some banding together to survive (the Circle) while others descended into anarchic survivalism (the Militants).

Touko Deguchi (出口 桐子, Deguchi Tōko)
The club president of the St. Isidore University's Degeneracy Appreciation Society (自堕落同好会, Jidaraku Dōkō-kai), also known as the Circle, a small team of women who are at odds with some of the other students who are more focused on survival. She has a collection of video games and movies that she can play using the university's facilities. She makes an anime-original cameo in anime's final episode post-credits. She left the Militants when she disagreed with their strict methods. Unlike the Militants, she does not enforce body checks for signs of infection.
Aki Hikarizato (光里 晶, Hikarizato Aki)
Member of the Circle and like most of its members, she was a former member of Militants until she left after having a glimpse of the thrilling pleasure that Ayaka took in the zombie apocalypse. She was a Liberal Arts Major before the outbreak.
Hikako Kirai (喜来 比嘉子, Kirai Hikako)
Repairman of the Circle, nicknamed Hika for short. She is quiet and kind, but was kicked out of the Militants after failing to kill a zombie by herself in fear, being deemed too weak to survive. She was an Engineering student and performs maintenance on the facilities that the Circle uses.
Rise Ryougawara (稜河原 理瀬, Ryougawara Rise)
The bookworm and librarian of the Circle, she often remains in the school library to read books due to her love of books and rarely leaves. She was also a Liberal Arts Major before the outbreak.
Shiiko Aosoi (青襲 椎子, Aosoi Shiiko)
An older student from the University who has been studying the infection on her own for weeks. After traveling to Randal Corporation HQ, Aosoi deduces the possible location of a cure for the infection, but becomes infected herself and dies before she is able to directly relay that information. She leaves behind notes of the cure in her cellphone, which the girls use to stop the virus.
Takahito Tougo (頭護 貴人, Tōgo Takahito)
Leader of the Militants, the more survival-oriented combatant group of students at the university. He enforces body checks on all members of the club in order to eliminate the chance of a zombie infection among them. He is often seen with a negative outlook and expression because of the stress of surviving the outbreak. He uses a nail bat as a weapon. He is betrayed by Ayaka after he is infected, pushed into a horde of zombies and burned alive to cover her escape from the university.
Ayaka Kamimochi (神持 朱夏, Kamimochi Ayaka)
One of the remaining female members of the Militants, she usually is calm and without obvious emotion but secretly takes great pleasure in killing zombies and people alike, as a means of having a fulfilling existence. She is adept at using a crossbow and knife as weapons. She kills Takahito to distract the zombies and escape the university, as she believes that she will have far more fun outside the walls of the college.
Shinou Uhara (右原 篠生, Uhara Shinō)
The other female member of the Militants, she has a side ponytail and is the main zombie exterminator of the group. She has a kind-hearted nature, but is efficient in exterminating zombies. She considers another member of the Militants, Kougami, as a precious person and has been hinted to be pregnant. She is adept with a variety of weapons, usually using an ice pick or a similar short weapon.
Renya Kougami (高上 聯弥, Kougami Renya)
Another member of the Militants. Nicknamed Ren, he uses a crossbow and is Shinou's lover.
Takashige Shiroshita (城下 隆茂, Shiroshita Takashige)
Another member of the Militants.

=== Other characters ===
Radio DJ (ラジオDJ, Rajio Dī Jē)
A girl who broadcasts on a pirate radio station in the hopes of reaching out to any survivors. Unfortunately, she succumbs to her infection before the School Living Club is able to reach her. She does, however, live long enough to leave a note behind explaining to any survivors that come across her hideout to take the keys to the hideout and motorhome, which the girls do.
Ruu-chan (るーちゃん)
Yuuri's little sister who is in elementary school. Yuuri seemingly rescues her from the elementary school after the School Living Club leaves their own school. In reality, Ruu is actually just Yuki's teddy bear that Yuuri deluded herself into thinking is her sister similar to Yuki's delusions of Megumi. The others from St. Isidore University and the School Living Club, including Yuki, were simply playing along to keep Yuuri happy and sane as they did for Yuki in the past. Yuuri eventually comes to terms with Ruu's death, giving the bear to Shinou for her baby.

== Media ==
=== Manga ===
School-Live! is written by Nitroplus' Norimitsu Kaihō and illustrated by Sadoru Chiba. It began serialization on May 24, 2012, in the July issue of Houbunsha's Manga Time Kirara Forward magazine. The series went on hiatus between July and December 2017. It ended on November 22, 2019. Houbunsha published the first tankōbon volume on December 12, 2012, with the twelfth and final volume released on January 10, 2020. Yen Press began releasing the series in English in November 2015. Three manga anthologies illustrated by various artists have also been released, the first on July 13, 2015, the second on September 12, 2015, and the third on January 12, 2016.

A sequel manga series by Kaihō and Chiba, titled School-Live! Letters was serialized in Manga Time Kirara Forward from June 24, 2020, to August 24, 2021. Yen Press has also licensed the sequel manga.

==== Volumes ====
No.	Original release date	Original ISBN	English release date	English ISBN
1	December 12, 2012	978-4-8322-4236-4	November 17, 2015	978-0-316-30970-7
2	June 12, 2013	978-4-8322-4309-5	February 23, 2016	978-0-316-30988-2
3	December 12, 2013	978-4-8322-4378-1	May 24, 2016	978-0-316-30992-9
4	July 11, 2014	978-4-8322-4462-7	August 23, 2016	978-0-316-30995-0
5	March 12, 2015	978-4-8322-4538-9	November 15, 2016	978-0-316-31001-7
6	August 11, 2015	978-4-8322-4603-4	March 21, 2017	978-0-316-50272-6
7	January 12, 2016	978-4-8322-4653-9	June 20, 2017	978-0-316-47172-5
8	August 10, 2016	978-4-8322-4730-7	September 19, 2017	978-0-316-55967-6
9	March 11, 2017	978-4-8322-4813-7	December 12, 2017	978-0-316-41408-1
10	June 12, 2018	978-4-8322-4952-3	February 19, 2019	978-1-975-38386-2
11	January 12, 2019	978-4-8322-7057-2	October 29, 2019	978-1-975-35865-5
12	January 10, 2020	978-4-8322-7148-7	August 18, 2020	978-1-975-31550-4
13	October 12, 2021	978-4-8322-7314-6	February 21, 2023	978-1-975-36315-4

=== Anime ===
An anime television series was announced on June 21, 2014. The series was directed by Masaomi Ando at Lerche, with scripts by manga writer Norimitsu Kaihō and character design by Haruko Iikuza. The series aired between July 9 and September 24, 2015. The series features four pieces of theme music; one opening theme and three ending themes. The opening theme is "Friend Shitai" (ふ・れ・ん・ど・し・た・い, Furendo Shitai; "I Want To Be Friends") by Gakuen Seikatsu-bu (Inori Minase, Ari Ozawa, M.A.O, and Rie Takahashi). The ending theme is "Harmonize Clover" (ハーモナイズ・クローバー, Hāmonaizu Kurōbā) by Maon Kurosaki for episodes 1–3, 5, and 9, "We took each other's hand" by Kaori Sawada for episode 4, and "Afterglow" (アフターグロウ, Afutāgurō) by Kurosaki for episode 6–8 and 10–11. A drama CD based on the anime television series was released at Comiket 88 on August 14, 2015.

The series was simulcast by Crunchyroll. The series was licensed in North America by Sentai Filmworks and released on Blu-ray and DVD with an English dub on June 27, 2017. After the acquisition of Crunchyroll by Sony Pictures Television, School-Live!, among several Sentai Filmworks titles, was dropped from the Crunchyroll streaming service on March 31, 2022.

==== Episode list ====
No.	Title	Written by	Original air date
1	"Beginning" "Hajimari" (はじまり)	Norimitsu Kaiho	July 9, 2015
Yuki Takeya is a cheerful high school girl who lives at school and spends time with the School Living Club alongside fellow members Kurumi Ebisuzawa, Yuuri Wakasa, and Miki Naoki, and their advisor, Megumi Sakura. During classes, Yuki and Miki chase after their pet dog, Tarōmaru, who decides to go wandering off on his own, eventually tracking him down. Later on, as Miki accompanies Yuki as she retrieves her bag from class, it is revealed that Yuki's view of a rosy school life with her classmates is all in her head. In reality, she and the other members of the School Living Club are the only survivors of their school following a zombie outbreak.
2	"Memories" "Omoide" (おもいで)	Yuichiro Higashide	July 16, 2015
Kurumi recalls an upperclassman that she had a crush on before he became a zombie. As Kurumi scouts the school for any wandering zombies, she is shocked to see one of them was once the upperclassman's girlfriend, which she is forced to kill. Later, Yuki suggests that everyone go on a test of courage through the school, which the others use as a motive to obtain supplies. While exploring the library, Yuki comes close to encountering a zombie, but is calmed down by Megumi and encouraged to hide while the others lure it away and finish it off, with Yuki remaining unaware.
3	"That Time" "Ano Toki" (あのとき)	Hikaru Sakurai	July 23, 2015
Writing in her diary, Megumi recalls the events of the day everything changed. Going through what should've been a normal day of school, Megumi helps Yuki with a make-up test while giving Kurumi some love advice. After discovering some disturbing texts from her mother about the situation outside, Megumi takes Yuki to the rooftops, where Yuuri had been attending the garden. There, Megumi learns about the zombie attack, with Kurumi and her injured upperclassman also making their way up to the rooftop. As the others are forced to barricade the door from approaching zombies, Kurumi is attacked by her zombified upperclassman and is forced to kill him in front of Yuki. Back in the present, Yuki suggests everyone participate in a camping trip during a power outage, with everyone feeling thankful for everything Megumi has done for them.
4	"Outing" "Ensoku" (えんそく)	Makoto Fukami	July 30, 2015
Miki recalls her experiences of the incident, in which she and her friend, Kei Shido, along with Tarōmaru, were at a shopping mall when the outbreak occurred. As the three spend the following weeks hiding out in the mall's upper offices, Kei eventually grows tired of being inside all of the time and sets off outside, leaving Miki and Tarōmaru by themselves. Meanwhile, Yuki proposes to the club that they go on a school outing. As the girls take Megumi's car and make their way towards the mall, Miki discovers that Tarōmaru has gone missing too.
5	"Meeting" "Deai" (であい)	Yuichiro Higashide	August 6, 2015
Yuki and the others arrive at the shopping mall, exploring the place for supplies while taking care to avoid zombies. While visiting the supermarket section, Kurumi comes across Tarōmaru, who the group decides to take with them. As the girls end up disturbing a large group of zombies and are forced to retreat, Miki hears their cries and goes off in search of them. The girls jump into the river as the zombies tries to catch them, though Megumi ends up drowning and is saved by Kurumi. Just as the girls start to head back to the school, Yuki manages to hear Miki as she becomes cornered by zombies, allowing the girls to come to her rescue in the nick of time.
6	"Welcome" "Yōkoso" (ようこそ)	Kiyomune Miwa	August 13, 2015
Given a tour of the school by Yuki upon waking up, Miki quickly comes to learn about her delusions, including the fact that the existence of Megumi is also one of them. Later, Yuuri and Kurumi later explain to Miki how the real Megumi, who founded the School Living Club with Yuuri, sacrificed herself in order to protect her students from the zombies, the shock of which left Yuki with the delusion that Megumi and the other students are still alive. Asked by the others to play along with this act, Miki reluctantly takes part in a sports meet with everyone, where she learns a little about how Yuki's way of thinking helps everyone. Wanting to understand more, Miki decides to become a trial member of the School Living Club.
7	"A Letter" "Otegami" (おてがみ)	Ukyō Kodachi	August 20, 2015
Back in the present, as Yuki's delusion starts to show signs of cracking, Miki grows concerned that letting things continue this way is doing Yuki more harm than good. Later, Yuki manages to find a stationery set among Megumi's belongings, which the club decides to use to write letters to send outside, while Miki finds a key, which she gives to Yuuri for safekeeping. The next day, the girls send off their letters on balloons, with Miki writing one for Kei.
8	"Future" "Shōrai" (しょうらい)	Kiyomune Miwa	August 27, 2015
After Yuki and Kurumi give Tarōmaru a much-needed bath, the girls discuss their plans after they graduate while Yuuri recalls the day, she and Megumi started the School Living Club. Later that night, Miki becomes curious about the school's excessive facilities that have allowed them to survive and joins Yuuri in searching the staff room for whatever Megumi's key unlocks. With Yuki's help, they find a hidden safe containing an emergency manual, which reveals the school was involved with a biological weapon and was constructed as a safe house in the event of an outbreak.
9	"Holiday" "Kyūjitsu" (きゅうじつ)	Ryo Morise	September 3, 2015
As the girls further inspect the manual, learning of a shelter hidden in the school's basement, Yuki ropes everyone into cleaning the school's water tank to use as a swimming pool. While the girls take their minds off of things by swimming and having water fights, Miki finds herself able to grow closer to Tarōmaru, who was cold to her before. Afterwards, Yuki gives Miki some advice that if she enjoys herself, she will surely meet Kei again. Later that night, Tarōmaru breaks free from his leash and goes down into the basement, where he comes across a familiar-looking zombie.
10	"Rainy Day" "Ame no Hi" (あめのひ)	Hikaru Sakurai	September 10, 2015
Upon discovering that Tarōmaru has gone missing, the girls go off in search of him. Following his tracks down to the basement, Kurumi finds Tarōmaru, only to find he had become infected. Managing to lock Tarōmaru up, Kurumi enters the underground shelter only to discover that the zombie who bit him is none other than Megumi herself, becoming bitten by her when she hesitates to attack her. As the girls struggle over what to do as Kurumi's condition worsens, Miki learns of an antidote located in the shelter and decides to go to the basement, but is soon overcome with grief over Tarōmaru. Meanwhile, as zombies start making their way inside the school, Yuki begins to remember something.
11	"Scar" "Kizuato" (きずあと)	Makoto Fukami	September 17, 2015
With zombies spreading across the school, Yuki rushes over to Miki's aid, giving her the encouragement she needs to go off in search of the antidote. Meanwhile, a thunderstorm strikes the school's power generator, cutting the school's power, while Yuuri comes close to killing Kurumi before she completely turns, but cannot bring herself to do it. Down in the basement, Miki comes face to face with Megumi, assuring her that the others are doing fine before putting her to rest. Miki manages to find the antidote, only to become cornered by zombies alerted by the backup power's alerts. Meanwhile, Yuki, who gradually remembers what really happened, is guided by her version of Megumi towards the broadcasting room, finally coming to terms with Megumi's death.
12	"Graduation" "Sotsugyō" (そつぎょう)	Norimitsu Kaiho	September 24, 2015
Arriving at the broadcasting room, Yuki is cornered by zombies but is saved by Tarōmaru, who had instinctively come to her rescue. Realising that the zombies still retain their residual memories, Yuki manages to send all the zombie students away by telling them to go home, allowing Miki to deliver the antidote. Although the antidote manages to cure Kurumi of her condition, Tarōmaru is left weak from being infected for so long and dies in Miki's arms. After giving Tarōmaru a proper burial alongside Megumi, the girls learn that the reason he went down to the basement was to search for another puppy that was somewhere in the school. With the school no longer habitable due to the damage done to the electricity, the girls decide to head towards a university marked on a map by Megumi, holding a graduation ceremony to bid their farewells to the school. As the girls set off on their "graduation trip", another girl elsewhere comes across one of their letters.

=== Live-action film ===
A live-action film adaptation of School-Live! was announced in the January 2018 issue of Manga Time Kirara Forward in November 2017. The film was directed by Issei Shibata and stars the members of idol group Last Idol. It was released in Japan on January 25, 2019. Unlike the anime, the live action film centered on Kurumi as the main character. In the film, Miki is also able to fight dangerous zombies, and Taromaru is absent in the whole film.

=== Other media ===
Yuki appeared as a support character in a fighting game called Nitroplus Blasterz: Heroines Infinite Duel, which was released in December 2015. She, along with the other characters, also appears in the 2017 mobile RPG, Kirara Fantasia.

== Reception ==
=== Manga ===
The official Twitter account of Houbunsha's Manga Time Kirara magazines has announced that School-Live! has two million copies in print as of March 2017. The English release of the first three volumes were also included on the American Library Association's list of 2017 Great Graphic Novels for Teens, and the fifth and sixth volumes made the 2018 list. School-Live! was nominated for the 52nd Seiun Awards in the Best Comic category in 2021.

=== Anime ===
The first episode of the anime was well-received and sparked a ten-fold increase in manga sales. It was also viewed more than one million times on Niconico.
