= School-Live! (film) =

2019 Japanese film

- Theatrical teaser poster.

Japanese name
- Kanji: がっこうぐらし!
Transcriptions
- Revised Hepburn: Gakkō Gurashi!
- Directed by: Issei Shibata
- Written by: Issei Shibata
- Based on: School-Live! by Norimitsu Kaihō
- Produced by: Toshinori Yamaguchi
- Starring: Midori Nagatsuki; Nanami Abe; Wakana Majima; Rio Kiyohara; Nonoka Ono; Daichi Kaneko
- Cinematography: Kazuaki Yoshizawa
- Edited by: Sagara Naoichiro
- Music by: Shu Kanematsu
- Production companies: Dub Inc. NBCUniversal Entertainment Japan
- Distributed by: Regents(Japan); Sentai Filmworks(International)
- Release date: January 25, 2019; (Japan)
- Running time: 105 minutes
- Country: Japan
- Language: Japanese

School-Live! (Japanese: がっこうぐらし!, Hepburn: Gakkō Gurashi!) is a 2019 Japanese horror film. It is an adaptation of the manga series of the same name by Norimitsu Kaihō and Sadoru Chiba. The film was announced in an issue of Manga Time Kirara Forward in November 2017, and it was released by Universal Pictures and Regents in Japan on January 25, 2019.

The film is directed by Issei Shibata and starred the members of the idol group Last Idol. Sentai Filmworks distributed the film in the United States, Canada, United Kingdom, Ireland, Australia, New Zealand, Latin America, Nordic countries, the Netherlands, Spain and Portugal.

== Premise ==
It tells the story of Kurumi Ebisuzawa, Yuki Takeya, Yuuri Wakasa and Miki Naoki attending the same high school in Japan, but they also know one another because they reside in the school's dormitory and having a school club. The school girls are having fun until a zombie outbreak occurs, infecting the school population. The four girls must now learn to survive in this new world, if they want to stay alive.

== Cast ==
- Midori Nagatsuki as Yuki Takeya
- Nanami Abe as Kurumi Ebisuzawa
- Wakana Majima as Yūri Wakasa
- Rio Kiyohara as Miki Naoki
- Nonoka Ono as "Megu-nee" Megumi Sakura
- Daichi Kaneko as Tsumugi Katsuragi

== Reception ==
Matt Schley from The Japan Times gave the film a score of 1.5 out of 5 citing: "Being aggressively boring, in fact, is the greatest sin of School-Live The principle that each scene of a film should push the story forward is discarded with abandon". The movie was praised by the authors of the original School-Live! manga series.
