= Tokui =

Tokui (written: 徳井) is a Japanese surname. Notable people with the surname include:

- Sora Tokui (徳井 青空, born 1989), Japanese voice actress, singer and manga artist
- Yu Tokui (徳井 優, born 1959), Japanese actor
