= TV Champion =

- Also known as: TV Champion; TV Champion 2
- Presented by: Yoshitake Tanaka; Akiko Matsumoto
- Country of origin: Japan

Production
- Production location: Various locations
- Running time: 60 minutes (1992 - 1993); 90 minutes (1993 - 2006); 55 minutes (2006 - 2008)

Original release
- Network: TV Tokyo
- Release: 16 April 1992 – 18 September 2008

Lego Tōdai-ji created by a contestant for an episode

TV Champion (TVチャンピオン, Terebi Champion) is a Japanese television variety show produced by TV Tokyo. The show challenges competitors with various talents in an array of tasks in order to crown one "King" of their ability. Episodes have focused on talents like Origami, Lego, Disney, and cooking fake food. TV Champion premiered on 16 April 1992 (20:00-21:00) as a 1-hour show, but was extended to a 90-minute format in 1993 (19:30-21:00). And change format to TV Champion 2 in 2006 by running 1 hour.
