= Bluem of Youth =

Japanese pop group

Bluem of Youth (Russian: Цветы юности) is a Japanese pop group which achieved greatest success in the late 1990s after it was the subject of a reality television series called Susunu! Denpa Shōnen. The name is a mix of "bloom of youth" and "blue". Its members are Yuji Bessho (別所悠二) and Hiroyuki Matsugashita (松ヶ下宏之). They went on permanent hiatus on New Year's Eve of 2002, but played a 10th anniversary concert commemorating their debut in 2005.

The duo traveled across Russia by Trans-Siberian Railway for seven months from March to October 1999, for a Japanese television program called Susunu! Denpa Shōnen. Their career was at a crossroads due to poor sales and their contract with their record label was not renewed.

== Discography ==
=== Singles ===
- Saigo no Negai (10 October 1995)
- 10 Calls After (13 December 1995)
- TRUTH (1 July 1996)
- Time goes by ... Kimi ga Irudake de / Senrozoi no Koi (1 October 1997)
- Garden (21 March 1998)
- Russian Roulette (20 June 1998)
- Koe (2 December 1998)
- Last Tour ~Yakusoku no Basho e~ (1 December 1999)
- Stairway (23 February 2000)
- Lover's slit (2 August 2000)
- If (12 October 2000)
- Yudachi -sound of the memory- (8 August 2001)
- Saruveju (9 October 2002)
- Hitohira no Yume (4 December 2002)

=== Albums ===
- bloom of youth (1 February 1996)
- Target (1 July 1998)
- Supasība (Спасибо, en: Thank you) (15 March 2000)
- Early Singles+ (19 April 2000)
- Fuyu no Shizuku (5 December 2001)
- Gift -Bluem of Extra- (27 March 2002)
- GROWIN' DAYS (18 December 2002)
- 20021228 LIVE COMPLETE (23 April 2003)

=== DVD ===
- Supasība Tour 2000 (23 August 2000)
- 12 Clips+ (28 March 2001)
- Ichiya Ensōkai -classical premium- (18 December 2002)
- GROWIN' DAYS CLIPS + (19 February 2003)
