= A Tale of Mari and Three Puppies =

- Film poster
- Directed by: Ryuichi Inomata
- Written by: Kodai Yamada; Yuki Kiyomoto; Ako Takahashi
- Produced by: Hitoshi Endo; Shin Horiguchi; Hisashi Usui
- Starring: Eiichiro Funakoshi; Akiko Matsumoto; Ryohei Hirota; Mao Sasaki; Yu Tokui
- Cinematography: Nobuyasu Kita
- Edited by: Chise Sanjo
- Music by: Joe Hisaishi
- Production company: Toho Pictures
- Distributed by: Toho
- Release date: 8 December 2007 (Japan)
- Running time: 124 minutes
- Country: Japan
- Language: Japanese
- Box office: $30,183,621

A Tale of Mari and Three Puppies (Japanese: マリと子犬の物語, Hepburn: Mari to Koinu no Monogatari) is a 2007 Japanese film directed by Ryuichi Inomata. It was released in Japanese cinemas on 8 December 2007. It is based on a true story in the 2004 Chūetsu earthquake. This story has frequently been reported in the media and was also turned into a book.

== Plot ==
On the way back home, Ryota and his sister Aya met an abandoned Shiba Inu. At first reluctant to adopt it because their father hates dogs, they eventually brought it home secretly because the dog kept on following them home. In order to officially keep the dog at home, Aya told her grandfather that she wanted that dog for her birthday present. Since he promised to give her anything she wants for her birthday, he reluctantly agreed. This initially led to a quarrel between him and his son. Meanwhile, his son, is considering moving to Nagaoka city from Yamakoshi, their village, reduce the time needed for his father to reach the hospital and for the children to live near their school, despite opposition from his father. Aya subsequently names the dog Mari, and it becomes a part of the family.

A year later, Mari gave birth to three puppies. That spring, animals behaved strangely, foreshadowing something major to come. On 23 October 2004, a major earthquake, which later became known as the Chūetsu earthquake struck and devastated the whole village. At that time, only grandfather and Aya were at home, and they were pinned down by a wardrobe that collapsed onto them. Mari quickly moved her puppies to a safe place before trying to help the two of them in the house.

Meanwhile, Ryota, who was in school, and his father were safe. They immediately went to the emergency shelter, where they heard that Yamakoshi became isolated after the earthquake, thereby making it hard for rescuers. Subsequently, rescuers from the Japan Self-Defense Forces started combing the village and evacuating people by helicopter. Mari noticed two such rescuers and eventually led them to Aya and her grandfather. Thanks to Mari, the two of them were successfully extracted from the wreckage. Her grandfather had lost a lot of blood, and therefore the pair was evacuated by air. However, just when Aya was about to be evacuated, she asked that Mari be evacuated along as well. Her rescuer reluctantly refuses this request, and seeing her pain at being separated from the dog, he felt extremely bad. He even apologizes to her when they met again at the emergency shelter. Without her owner, Mari tries all ways and means to protect her puppies and feed them properly. She also waited patiently for the return of her owner.

One day, Aya read in a newspaper that torrential rain would soon flood Yamakoshi and became worried about Mari. She convinces Ryota to sneak into the disaster zone in order to rescue Mari. Together they sneaked off into the devastated village, but they have difficulties navigating through the debris there. To make things worse, they also had to contend with aftershocks and the heavy rain. In this treacherous terrain, Aya cuts her foot, making it painful for her to carry on. She later runs a high fever, and Ryota panics, unsure of what to do in this situation. Luckily, someone who had seen them leaving the shelter had told their father of their whereabouts, and their father managed to find them after a long search.

After this incident, Aya did not mention about Mari anymore. When the aftershocks subsided, each family was able to send one representative to go into the village to survey the damage and to collect personal items. Since everyone at the shelter had heard the story of Mari, some people forgo their places to let Ryota and Aya search for Mari again. After a long search, there was no sign that Mari or her three puppies were alive. Just when they were about to give up, a puppy appears, followed by the rest of the dogs. The family happily took back the dogs to the shelter amid applause from the villagers.

In 2005, the family moved into a temporary shelter and life for them more or less returns to normal. Mari also lives there with her three puppies.

== Cast ==
- Eiichiro Funakoshi as Yuichi Ishikawa, an employee of the city hall of Yamakoshi, and the father of Ryota and Aya. He was recently widowed when his wife died due to an illness.
- Akiko Matsumoto as Saeko Hasegawa
- Ryohei Hirota as Ryota Ishikawa, the brother of Aya. He promised his late mother that he would protect his younger sister in times of hardship, and he takes this promise extremely seriously.
- Mao Sasaki as Aya Ishikawa, the five-year-old sister of Ryota.
- Yu Tokui
- Kenjiro Nashimoto
- Chihoko shigeta
- Yukijiro Hotaru
- Kazue Tsunogae
- Yoshikazu Ebisu
- Hiroki Miyake
- Masanobu Takashima
- Mao Kobayashi
- Takehiko Ono
- Ken Utsui

== See also ==
- 2004 Chūetsu earthquake
- Search and rescue dog
