= Akiko Matsumoto =

Japanese television personality and actress

- Born: 8 April 1966 (age 60); Takamatsu, Kagawa, Japan
- Occupation: Actress
- Years active: 1982–present
- Spouse: Yasukaze Motomiya

Akiko Matsumoto (松本 明子, Matsumoto Akiko; born 8 April 1966 in Takamatsu, Kagawa) is a Japanese TV personality and actress.

== Filmography ==
=== Films ===
- Supermarket Woman (1996), cashier
- Udon (2006)
- A Tale of Mari and the Three Puppies (2007), Saeko Hasegawa
- Sōzoku (2025), Sadako Hiiragi

=== Television drama ===
- Tsubasa (2009)

=== Other television ===
- Dempa Shōnen (????)
- Daisuki! (????)
- TV Champion (????)
