= Airi Taira =

Japanese actress (born 1984)

- 平 愛梨
- Born: December 12, 1984 (age 41); Akashi, Hyogo, Japan
- Occupation: Actress
- Years active: 1999–current
- Agent: Rising Production
- Known for: 20th Century Boys
- Height: 1.55 m (5 ft 1 in)
- Spouse: Yuto Nagatomo (m. 2017)
- Children: 3
- Relatives: Yuna Taira (sister); Keishō Taira (brother)
- Website: www.visionfactory.jp/artist/taira/index.html

Airi Nagatomo (長友 愛梨, Nagatomo Airi; born December 12, 1984), known by her birth and stage name Airi Taira (平 愛梨, Taira Airi), is a Japanese actress who graduated from the Horikoshi High School. She debuted in 1999 by winning the Da Pump's, ISSA's Sister Role Grand Prix for the movie Dream Maker. She played a lead role in the live action movie of 20th Century Boys as the character Kanna. Taira's parents are from the Amami Islands.

== Background and personal life ==
Her sister, Yuna, is also an actress.

She married Japanese international footballer Yuto Nagatomo, who played for Turkish club Galatasaray. He proposed to her on the San Siro pitch in February 2016 and they registered their marriage in January 2017. She wrapped up her filming commitments and relocated to Italy the following month. The couple have three sons.

Both of them appeared in the Captain Tsubasa Olympics special which, aired as part of the annual Jikan Terebi Nihon no Sport wa Tsuyo in November 2019.

== Filmography and appearances ==
=== TV dramas ===
- 3 nen B gumi Kinpachi sensei 6 As Akane Sasaoka (TBS, 2002), Akane Sasaoka
- Tantei Kazoku (NTV, 2002), Maho Tokura
- Lion Sensei (YTV, 2003), Momoko Enari
- Kuitan 2 Episode 8 (NTV, 2007), Naoko Harada
- Hanazakari no Kimitachi e (Fuji TV, 2007), Erica Abeno
- 20th Century Boys (NTV), Kanna Endō
  - Mouhitotsu no Dai 1-shō (2009)
  - Mouhitotsu no Dai 2-shō (2009)
  - Saga: Dai 1-ya (2012)
  - Saga: Dai 2-ya (2012)
  - Saga: Dai 3-ya (2012)
- Reset Episode 4 (YTV, 2009), Madoka Shimura
- Gyōretsu 48 Jikan (NHK, 2009), Sayaka
- Okabe Keibu Series 4 (Fuji TV, 2009), Mariko Ichijō
- Manyō Love Story Fuyu Episode 2 "Tanada no Marebito" (NHK Nara, 2010), Rika Miyamoto
- Tennōji Broadway (NHK Osaka, 2010)
- Jūi Dolittle Episode 3 (TBS, 2010)
- Hanchō 4: Jinnansho Azumihan Season 4, Episode 9 (TBS, 2011), Kaori Yabuki
- Piece Vote (NTV, 2011), Saki Iwami
- Nazotoki wa Dinner no Ato de Episode 8 (Fuji TV, 2011), Mai Kizaki
- Saiko no Jinsei Episode 5 (TBS, 2012), Erica
- Boys on the Run (TV Asahi, 2012), Hana Ooiwa
- Tokyo Zenryoku Shōjo (NTV, 2012), Aki Ozaki
- Otasukeya Jinpachi (YTV, 2013), Mayumi Ōno
- Mama ni Naritai... (NHK BS Premium, 2013), Konomi Mashita
- Tabemonogatari Kanojo no Kondatechō (NHK BS Premium, 2013)
- Kuroneko, Tokidoki Hanaya (NHK BS Premium, 2013), Kiyoka Hinata
- Tokyo Bandwagon: Shitamachi Daikazoku Monogatari (NTV, 2013), Ami Hotta
- Keisatsu Daigakkou: Hinomaru Kyōju no Jiken Note (TV Tokyo, 2014), Kyōko Teranishi
- Shin Munesue Keiji Series Series 8 "Munesue Keiji no Kuroi Matsuri" (TV Asahi, 2015), Ryōka Ashihara

=== TV Specials ===
- Captain Tsubasa (2019)

=== Movies ===
- Dreammaker (1999), Ai Sugiura
- Daburusu (2001), Kazumi
- Boutaoshi! (2003), Sayuri Konno
- Warau Michael (2006), Yuzu Sarashina
- 20th Century Boys, Kanna
  - 20th Century Boys (2008)
  - 20th Century Boys 2: The Last Hope (2009)
  - 20th Century Boys 3: Redemption (2009)
- Tanatosu (2011), Chihiro Sakai
- Karappo (2012), Sheena
- Helter Skelter (manga) (2012), Mako
- Sesshi 100-do no Binetsu (2015), Chinami Ezaki
- Ju-on: The Final Curse (2015), Mai Shono

=== Animation ===
Doraemon: New Nobita and the Castle of Undersea Devil (2026), Mu Federation Soldier

=== Stage ===
- BOB (Panasonic Globe Theatre, Sankei Hall Breezé, 27 April 2012 – 29 May 2012), Natsumi Tabata
- Love Letters: 2012 22nd Anniversary (Parco Theater at Shibuya, 21 September 2012), Melissa Gardner

=== Web dramas ===
- Five Stories of Ikspiari (Open Cast)
- Overwork (Vision Factory, 2009)
- 10-ka Kan de Unmei no Koibito o Mitsukeru Houhou (BeeTV, 20 April 2014), Nijiko Kiyose

=== Dubbing ===
- Jack the Giant Slayer (2013), Princess Isabelle

=== Narrations ===
- Urusawa Naoki's Manben (2015–present), Voice Over Narrator

=== Commercials ===
- Asian2 - Country Road (2007)

== Bibliography ==
=== Photobooks ===
- Ai Tai (Saibunkan, February 2005), ISBN 978-4775600658
- A (Wani Books, 27 September 2013), ISBN 978-4847045837

== Discography ==
=== Singles ===
- Wish (Toy's Factory, 12 April 2000)

=== Video/DVDs ===
- The 1st. (Rolans Film, 25 February 2005)
- Airinku (Line Communications, 20 May 2005)

== Award ==
- 33rd Japan Academy Prize Best Newcomer for NTV drama 20th Century Boys
