= Kunihiro Matsumura =

Japanese comedian and impressionist (born 1967)

- 松村 邦洋
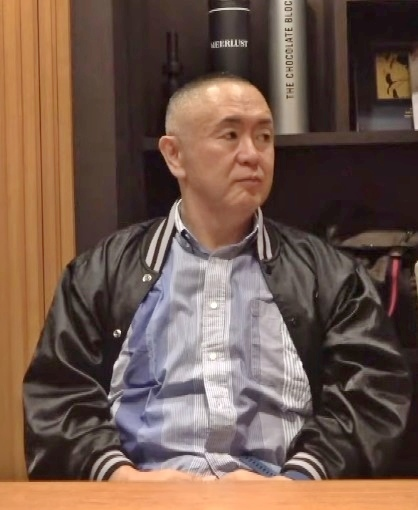
- Born: 11 August 1967 (age 58); Yamaguchi Prefecture, Japan
- Occupations: Comedian, impressionist
- Height: 1.64 m (5 ft 5 in)

Notes
- Same year/generation as: Bakusho Mondai; Ameagari Kesshitai; Summers

Kunihiro Matsumura (松村 邦洋, Matsumura Kunihiro; born 11 August 1967) is a Japanese comedian and impressionist most known for his impersonations of famous figures such as Beat Takeshi and Takanohana Kōji. He was also the original host of the hit comedy reality show Susume! Denpa Shonen. While originally making his obesity part of his jokes, Matsumura suffered a heart attack when he tried to run the Tokyo Marathon in 2009 as part of a TV show. He recovered and subsequently tried to maintain his weight.

== See also ==
- Matsumura Kunihiro Den: Saikyō no Rekishi o Nurikaero!, a 1994 Super Famicom game featuring Kunihiro Matsumura
