= The Contestant (2023 film) =

2023 documentary film by Clair Titley

- Directed by: Clair Titley
- Produced by: Megumi Inman; Andee Ryder; Ian Bonhôte; Amit Dey
- Starring: Tomoaki Hamatsu; Toshio Tsuchiya
- Narrated by: Fred Armisen
- Production companies: MRC; Misfits Entertainment
- Distributed by: MetFilm Distribution
- Release dates: September 8, 2023 (TIFF); November 29, 2024 (United Kingdom); May 2, 2024 (United States)
- Running time: 90 minutes
- Country: United Kingdom
- Languages: English; Japanese

The Contestant is a 2023 British documentary film directed by Clair Titley. It tells the story of Tomoaki Hamatsu, better known as Nasubi (なすび, "Eggplant"), as he starred in the challenge, starting in 1998, of Denpa Shōnen teki Kenshō Seikatsu (電波少年的懸賞生活; lit. "Denpa Shōnen's Prize Life") on the Japanese reality TV show Susunu! Denpa Shōnen (進ぬ！電波少年 "Do not proceed! Crazy youth"), and also some of his subsequent life as a famous person.

== Cast ==
- Nasubi as himself
- Toshio Tsuchiya as himself, a producer of Susunu! Denpa Shōnen, the show on which Nasubi's segment aired
- Fred Armisen as the narrator

== Summary ==
Hamatsu was challenged to stay alone, unclothed, in an apartment for Susunu! Denpa Shōnen, a Japanese reality-television show on Nippon Television. He was challenged to enter mail-in sweepstakes until he won ¥1 million (about $8,000) in total. He started with nothing (including no clothes), was cut off from outside communication and broadcasting, and had nothing to keep him company except the magazines he combed through for sweepstakes entry forms.

During the show, his diaries on his experience of being locked away from the outside world became a best seller in Japan, and the TV show broke all records with 17 million viewers each Sunday night.

== Development and production ==
Jennie Kermode interviewed Titley on Eye For Film:

Since the end of his ordeal, which went on for over a year, Nasubi has moved on to do some remarkable things with his life. He’s a man of considerable fortitude, but still, it’s difficult to make a film about something like Denpa Shōnen without a risk of exploiting the subject all over again. When I met with Clair to talk about the film, this concern was the first thing we discussed.

"It was huge concern for me," she says. "I think whenever you make a film, you're always conscious of not wanting to retraumatise your interviewees or contributors, but particularly in this instance, because we're making a film about a TV programme that obviously was very traumatic for Nasubi. And so the way I approached it was that consent was a really important part of this."

Titely originally made contact with Nasubi by writing to him via a translator. Titley told Nasubi "I want to collaborate, I want to make it in this way and I want to make it about your story." At Nasubi’s instigation, he came to the UK, and then the three of them - Nasubi, Titley and the translator - spent time travelling together in the UK.

"We spent a lot of time in the car just talking and unpacking a lot of this story and a lot of the things that he hadn't been asked before, which surprised me, and a lot of things he hadn't unpacked. So that's how the relationship started. It's been a long journey, as all these things are, and I think we're still on it."

"There were what felt like years of lawyers talking to each other in LA and Tokyo," she says. "That was horrendous, trying and very long. That's the process, however. Actually, one of the key people in helping us get access and smoothing the path for us was Toshio Tsuchiya, the producer [a producer of the original show], who was still working at the channel at the time and was able to just make sure that we were put in contact with the correct people. He let people know that he was involved and that it had his blessing. I wonder whether without him it would have been a lot more difficult. I don't know whether it would have happened. Interestingly, he was quite keen."

The documentary also includes a remarkable interview with Nasubi’s mother, who went through a traumatic experience of her own, seeing her son in that situation and feeling powerless to help him.

Titley said "All we had access to was what went out on air. We didn't have access to any dailies or any rushes, which was in some ways a huge challenge." and "we painstakingly translated all of the VFX, all of the graphics on screen into English".

== Release ==
The Contestant had its world premiere at the 2023 Toronto International Film Festival. It also screened at the Camden International Film Festival. In November 2023, Hulu acquired U.S. distribution rights to the documentary, and released it on May 2, 2024. As of January 2026, it is available on BBC iPlayer, and is stated to be available for over a year.

== Reception ==
On the review aggregator website Rotten Tomatoes, 92% of 52 critics gave the film a positive review. The website's consensus reads, "A transfixing depiction of abject cruelty, The Contestant raises a series of thought-provoking questions about human behavior, even if it leaves most of them largely unexplored." On Metacritic, the film holds a weighted average score of 67 out of 100 based on 14 critics, indicating "generally favorable reviews".

David Fear, in Rolling Stone, called the film "both a thought-provoking take on the lengths people go to achieve fame and fortune, and one hell of a wild ride." and "what sounds like a potential breakout documentary hit."

Jason Anderson, on the British Film Institute website, calls it a

short and shocking documentary

A look back at one of the earliest and strangest chapters in the history of reality TV, The Contestant is full of details that seem not just too weird to be true, but too cruel.

Indeed, the saga here has such an abundance of shocking and surprising turns, the film’s tight construction and modest runtime don’t leave much opportunity to delve more deeply into the questions arising from Hamatsu’s experience and how it anticipates equally sordid if less elaborate means of exploitation in the decades to come.

The Contestant is also too reserved when it comes to the process by which Hamatsu recovered his sense of self. Then again, it’s understandable that Titley treads gently with her main subject – clearly the man has suffered enough.

Peter Bradshaw writing in The Guardian says:

...this documentary is not as charming as it thinks.

There’s an extraordinary story that could be told here about the birth of reality television in all its cruelty and superficiality.

This was around the time of the movie The Truman Show and before our own TV staple Big Brother. It is genuinely mind-boggling, and yet this unsatisfying, naive and fundamentally uncritical documentary, despite careful modern-day interviews with the participants, doesn’t get to grips either with the story’s implications or with the story itself.

Poor Nasubi. Once he was let out (although of course he was always free to leave at any time), he found a new mission in raising money with a sponsored climb of Mount Everest to help his hometown of Fukushima, hit by the 2011 earthquake. The film tries to make this a heartwarming Hollywood redemption, but it’s not particularly compelling or convincing, and there’s no real discussion of this pop-culture Stanford Experiment, no real discussion of why Japan should have tolerated it, or if and how it inspired imitators all over the world.
