= Kuitan 2 =

2007 Japanese drama TV series

Kuitan 2 (喰いタン２) (The Gluttonous Detective 2) is a Japanese TV drama aired on Nippon TV from 14 April 2007 to 23 June 2007, as the sequel of the 2006 Japanese TV drama Kuitan. Both Kuitan and Kuitan 2 were inspired by the manga of the same name, but the episodes presented in the TV series are different from those in the original manga series. Kuitan 2 aired at 9pm on Saturdays.

== Cast ==
- Noriyuki Higashiyama as Seiya Takano, The Kuitan
- Gō Morita as Ryōsuke Noda
- Kotomi Kyōno as Momo Ogata
- Mikako Ichikawa as Kyōko Idemizu
- Kenta Suga as Hajime Kaneda
- Shirō Sano as Detective Igarashi
- Shirō Itō as Chief Yamauchi
- Rina Koike as Rei Kinoshita

== Guests ==
- Kinako Kobayashi (episode 2)
- Aki Maeda (episode 8)
- Airi Taira (episode 8)
- Akira Kubo (episode 10)
- Seina Kasugai (episodes 10 and 11)

== Episode list ==
| No. | Title | Original release date |
|---|---|---|
| 1 | "The secret ramen gets eaten away!" Transliteration: "Hiden no Rāmen o Kui Tsukusu!" (Japanese: 秘伝のラーメンを食いつくす!) | April 14, 2007 |
Takano, the kuitan, came back from his around-the-world gourmet tour to Japan and found the Holmes Agency was closed for good. Shaken by this, he visited his favorite ramen shop, Akatsuki, but he also found that the store was closed off by police. Detective Igarashi, who recognized the kuitan, brought him inside the store, where its owner was found dead. Staff of the store told that the store’s secret soup base was missing when they came in. Driven by his curiosity for food, the kuitan looked for a store that serves the same soup base. Meanwhile, Kyōko and Ryōsuke, who left the agency after a quarrel over tea while the kuita was not around, reconciled with each other. In the meantime, the kuitan got kidnapped by those who killed the owner of Akatsuki. Kaneda, who witnessed the car that droved off with the kuitan, told police its license number and notified Ryōsuke. Ryōsuke recklessly came for rescue but he also made himself caught. In the end, police managed to trace the location.
| 2 | "Held hostage but greedily eats pasta!" Transliteration: "Hitoji China no ni Supageti o Tabe Mukuru!" (Japanese: 人質なのに スパゲティを食べまくる) | April 21, 2007 |
A man with a knife smeared in blood came into the Holmes Agency office. He grabbed Kyōko and held his knife close to her neck. With the kuitan and Ryōsuke unsure of what to do, Momo and Igarashi dropped by and notify that they were running after a suspect who killed an Italian chef. While the detectives left the office, the man stayed. The kuitan noticed that the man had just had Italian food by the stain found on his clothing. Meanwhile, Momo, who were convinced that the suspect was hiding in the office, issued an order to surround the office. While the inside of the Agency remains tense with the stand off, a new report on TV tells that the man killed the owner chef of the Italian restaurant “Veeno.” The man started to recount what really happened in the restaurant. The suspect, who had just come out of prison today, visited the restaurant he would often go and ordered Spaghetti alla Bolognese. After finishing the dish that did not have the same taste as before, the man found out the chef lying on the floor with a stubbed knife. Without clearly thinking, he took out the knife and ran away when witnessed by a deliverer who happened to drop in. Ryōsuke, who sometimes visited the store commented that the taste of the dish had not changed much over the years. The kuitan reasoned that the change in the dish’s taste must be a clue to the case. Inside of the surrounded office, the members of the agency attempted to recreate the taste that the man remembered during his visit to the restaurant. It turned out the type of water used for cooking pasta was the key to the change in the taste of the dish. The killed chef used in cooking pasta hard water, which coats the surface of pasta in the process and makes pasta tasty. The pasta the man had at the restaurant turned out to be cooked in tap water, which resulted in a different taste. In the end, the waiter whom the man met in the restaurant was the suspect.
| 3 | "The secret of my chopsticks...the taste of my mother’s cooking gets eaten away!" Transliteration: "Puyopuyo Chotto Kata〜I o Kuirasu!" (Japanese: プヨプヨちょっとカタ〜いを食い荒らす!) | April 28, 2007 |
A foreigner, called Shiketa, whom the kuitan met at a dinner was brought in to the agency office. He was in search of a springy, hard Japanese food, which turned out to be Kakuni. To help his search, Kyōko cooked various types of kakuni, but none fitted the taste Shiketa remembered. Meanwhile, a diplomat Raymond from an oil-rich country visited Chief Yamada and urgently requested police to find the whereabouts of their prince. According to his story, suspicious activity has been detected surrounding the heir prince. Momo and Igarashi were ordered to find the prince and handed down a picture of the prince. The detectives came over to the agency and found out Shiketa was the lost prince that police was looking for. Oblivious to the development in the office, the Kuitan, Ryōsuke, and Shiketa hopped from one Japanese restaurant to another. Amid this, a sniper attacked the prince, and the surprised kuitan and Ryōsuke lost Shiketa. Momo and Igarashi, who scrambled to the scene, explained the situation to the kuitan. Subsequently, the kuitan found Shiketa in another restaurant and obtained an important clue to the mystery of the food, tofu skin. The food that they all thought kakuni turned out to be a vegetarian imitation. The chewing sensation that was absent from the dishes Kyōko cooked was created by the springiness of tofu skin. Eventually, Shiketa took out a Japanese wooden bowl and chopsticks that contained a family symbol and told the members of the agency that these were gifts from his mother, who had left his country when he was young. By locating a restaurant that carried the symbol, the kuitan successfully located Shiketa’s mother.
| 4 | "Greedily eats the love contained in the lunch box!" Transliteration: "Obentō ni Komi Motta Ai made Kui Tsukusu!" (Japanese: お弁当に込もった愛まで食いつくす!) | May 5, 2007 |
Igarashi, who was hurt by his beloved daughter’s cancel of a long-awaited meeting that arrives only once a month, received a message that the president of a sarakin company was murdered. The crime scene is the company’s office, where the suspect left his bag that contained his lunch and the picture of a family with a little boy. Igarashi and Momo, who investigated the scene, reasoned that the suspect must have been pressed to pay off his debt by the president. In the meantime, the kuitan, who came over to the crime scene, ate the lunch found in the back. Momo became furious when she caught his action, but the kuitan began searching exactly the same lunch box sold in the neighborhood. Igarashi with the suspect’s picture in his hand ran into a middle aged man who were staring at the window display of a doll for Children's Day. The guy turned out to be the suspect, Tsujitani. Igarashi pursued the suspect and cornered him on an overpass. Momo ordered Igarashi to fire a warning shot, but Igarashi hesitated when witnessed Tsujitani’s sad expression on his face. The suspect jumped off the overpass, and Igarashi was kicked off the case by Momo. With the support of Chief Yamauchi, Igarashi continued to investigate the case with the help of the Holmes Agency. The kuitan carried on his search for the lunch box and came to the realization that the lunchbox was homemade.
| 5 | "The neighbor's dinner!! Eats Japanese curry!?" Transliteration: "Tonari no Bangohan!! Karēraisu o Tabe Makuru!" (Japanese: 隣の晩ごはん!! カレーライスを食べまくる!) | May 12, 2007 |
The kuitan agreed to take care of Momo, who was a bit wore out from overwork, with the request of Chief Yamauchi, who visited the Holms Agency office. The kuitan and Ryōsuke expected her to cook for them while Kyōko is on a business trip to Europe, but Momo was only thinking about the case she was investigating. The case involved an arsonist who continued to set houses on fire in the area. Helping Momo, who ignored the chief’s order, the kuitan accompanied her investigation at the crime scene and found a large burnt pot full of curry. What is more, the family who became a target of the arsonist recounted that it was when the family was enjoying curry for dinner. Afterwards, Kaneda and the kuita ran into Kaneda’s classmate, Endo. The girl lived in a house close to the crime scene alone with her mother. With her father away from home and mother working busily at the hospital, Endo often stayed home by herself. Momo became suspicious of her and directed Igarashi to check on her. Igarashi, however, turned down her request and told her that she was off the case. Meanwhile, the kuitan noticed that the curry map that Kaneda created as a class project overlapped with the distribution of the crime scenes. A house that was set on fire despite not cooking curry on the night of the crime drew the kuitan’s attention. The curious kuitan visited the family and found the “curry plant" in the yard.
| 6 | "Arrived at Osaka!! Eats takoyaki till bankruptcy!?" Transliteration: "Kita de〜Ōsaka! Takoyaki de Kuida Ore!" (Japanese: 来たで〜大阪! たこ焼きで食いだおれ!) | May 19, 2007 |
A middle-aged woman, Kurara Sonoda, visited the Holmes Agency and requested to background check on a man called Kameda. According to the information that Kurara brought in, Kameda is an Engineer working for a home appliances maker. Ryōsuke, who took the case, left the office but soon came back with Kurara’s daughter, Aika. Aika secretly came over to Tokyo from Osaka, where the mother and daughter live, to spend time with Kameda. As it turned out, Kameda was Aika’s boyfriend, and they were planning to get married. Kurara did not agree with their marriage because Kaneda was from Kantō region. She was simply trying to find fault in him. When pressed about the reason, she recounted that her late-husband was a textbook Kantō-ite, often clashing with her on cooking styles. Kurara, who underwent hardships after her husband’s early death, seemingly had hard time accepting a Kantō-ite like her husband. The following day, the kuitan asked out Kurara for going to Yokohama for a walk with the intention of improving her image of Kantō. He took her to restaurants that serve Kantō-style tempura and oden to persuading her to accept the couple by explaining how exchange and merger of Kansai-style and Kantō-style created tasty foods. Just as they were about to eat Kantō-style Red bean soup, news that Kameda killed his company’s president reached the two. Shocked by the news, the kuitan and Ryōsuke went to police to hear more details of the incident. Momo and Igarashi told that Kaneda was harshly reprimanded by the president prior to his murder and did not have an established alibi. Although Kameda claimed that he was on a business trip to Osaka, his story lacked proof, as the Osaka branch maintained that he had never come to Osaka. What was more, the first witness heard the president mumbling the word “Kameyama” right before he died. The kuitan, who was allowed to meet Kameda, who was in custody, heard that he ate authentic takoyaki at a store somewhere in Tsūtenkaku. He flew to Osaka and started to investigate the store described by Kameda.
| 7 | "The kuitan loses his confidence!? The first blunder is Tsukune hot pot." Transliteration: "Kuitann ga Jishin Sōshitsu!? Hajimete no misu wa Tsukune Nabe" (Japanese: 喰いタンが自信喪失!? 初めてのミスはつくね鍋) | May 26, 2007 |
The day to time the 50 meter dash at school was about to come in two days. This month, the teacher in physical education class made students run 50 meter once a week to motivate students to improve their performance, but Kaneda, who lacks talent in sports is not in the mood. In fact, his thought was on his classmate Uehara Susumu, whose father was caught up in kidnapping by a group of jewelry robbers.
| 8 | "The taste of love!? The lunch at Women’s College gets eaten away!!" Transliteration: "Koi no Aji!? Joshidai Ranchi o Kui Tsukusu!!" (Japanese: 恋の味!? 女子大ランチを食いつくす!!) | June 6, 2007 |
| 9 | "Special edition! Why did people eat so much in the Edo period?" Transliteration: "Tokubutsu-hen!! Naze ka Edo Jidai de Tabe Makuru" (Japanese: 特別編!! なぜか江戸時代で食べまくる) | June 9, 2007 |
| 10 | "A close call! The final shakin!! Part 1"; Transliteration: "Kiki Ippatsu! Saigo no Shakīn!! Zenpen" (Japanese: 危機一髪! 最後のシャキーン!! 前編) | June 16, 2007 |
| Final | "My beloved Neapolitan forever..." Transliteration: "Itoshi no Naporitan yo Eien ni…" (Japanese: 愛しのナポリタンよ永遠に…) | June 23, 2007 |
