= Susunu! Denpa Shōnen =

Japanese reality television show

- Genre: Reality show
- Starring: Akiko Matsumoto
- Opening theme: Beyond, "The Great Wall"
- Country of origin: Japan

Original release
- Network: Nippon TV
- Release: January 11, 1998 – September 29, 2002

Susunu! Denpa Shōnen (進ぬ！電波少年) is a Japanese reality television show which aired from January 11, 1998, to September 29, 2002, on the Nippon TV network, and online from October 2009.

== Description ==
The title means "Do not proceed! Crazy youth". "Denpa" literally means radio waves, but colloquially also refers to crazy people, about instances of mentally insane people claiming to be controlled by radio waves. The title is also a pun; the predecessor of the show was called Susume! Denpa Shōnen (lit. Onward! Crazy Youth). To depict that the show had indeed moved onward, one of the characters of the title was changed from the "me" (め) to "nu" (ぬ), approximately meaning Do not proceed!.

The show is known for the extreme situations the participants were placed in. It gained high ratings, spawned a sister show, Raiha Shōnen (雷波少年), and was controversial due to the sadistic challenges and rule changes made by the television producers if they felt the participants were doing too well. The show also received criticism for some of the show segments being staged.

The participants were usually unknown comedians who were ready to do anything to get famous. Upon application, they were chosen randomly and were not told what the objective of their challenge was. Some of the challengers became more or less famous, while some remained relatively unknown.

The program's initial cancellation was related to a government crackdown on "torture"-themed shows, but has seen a revival on the World Wide Web from October 2009 on the streaming website Number Two Nihon Television (第2日本テレビ). Its first new "challenger" for the webcast was comedian Yoshio Kojima.

== Major challenges ==
In the four-year course of the original program, participants completed about 20 challenges.

Amongst the best known are:

- Denpa Shōnen teki Kenshō Seikatsu (電波少年的懸賞生活; lit. "Denpa Shōnen's Prize Life"), probably the best known challenge of the show. Starting in January 1998, Nasubi, a young comedian, was forced to live for 15 months naked in an apartment in Japan and later South Korea only on prizes won in sweepstakes.
- Denpa Shōnen teki Mujintō Dasshutsu (電波少年的無人島脱出; lit. "Denpa Shōnen's Desert Island Escape") and the Swam series. Two comedians were put on a desert island, with no food nor clue about where they were, and were only told that their ordeal would finish if they built a raft and reached Tokyo. After their escape from the desert island, which took them four months, they were given a swan-shaped pedalo and were told to reach Tokyo with it, and then go with the same pedalo from India to Indonesia.
- Denpa Shōnen teki Afurika Yūroppa Tairiku Ōdan Hitchihaiku no tabi (電波少年的アフリカ・ヨーロッパ大陸縦断ヒッチハイクの旅; lit. "Denpa Shōnen's Vertical Africa-Europe Continental Hitchhike"). A comedian named Takashi Itō and a radio DJ from Hong Kong named Tse Chiu-Yan hitchhiked from the Cape of Good Hope in South Africa to North Cape in Norway. The two contestants were forbidden to use their travel money and thus faced starvation, dehydration and harsh weather conditions. At one point in the challenge, Itō collapsed in the Sahara Desert and was airlifted to a local hospital for treatment.
- Denpa Shōnen teki Penanto Rēsu (電波少年的ペナントレース; lit. "Denpa Shōnen's Pennant Race"). This segment tested the loyalties of diehard fans of the Central League teams - the Yomiuri Giants, the Hanshin Tigers, and the Chunichi Dragons. The contestants would be confined to a single room with a TV that only showed their team's baseball games. Their faces would also be hidden from public view. If their team won, they got to eat dinner and a small portion of their face would be revealed to the audience. If their team lost, they would get no food and the lights would turn off, leaving them in darkness until the next day's game. If the contestant's favorite team went on a win streak, the quality of the food they could eat would increase as well as gain public exposure and popularity due to their entire face being shown on TV until their team finally lost. A losing streak would mean that a contestant could go days in the dark without food. At the end of the season, the contestant would win an overall prize depending on how their team placed.

== Denpa Shōnen International ==
Denpa Shōnen International was the special of the program with location shootings outside Japan, aired mainly on holidays or reorganizational periods of TV programs.

Kunihiro Matsumura, Akiko Matsumoto, and other guests performers attempted to visit foreign celebrities to do challenges without appointments. Major challenges include:

- Sing the song Ladybug Samba to Yasser Arafat of Palestine Liberation Organization.
- Meet foreign leaders and say "I hate you". Leaders that the programs ultimately succeed to meet were Nelson Mandela of South Africa and Jimmy Carter of the United States.
- Play rock paper scissors with Vladimir Zhirinovsky of the Liberal Democratic Party of Russia.
- Shave the beard of Fidel Castro of Cuba (failed).

Other challenges include:

- Stop AIDS Campaign (STOPエイズキャンペーン): Tetsurō Degawa went to LGBT Bars in London, San Francisco, and Sydney with a hidden wireless microphone to distribute condoms. During one distribution event, Degawa signaled he was being sexually harassed by a man but the staff of the program did not step in to help him. The program that was ultimately aired has the audio recording of Degawa being sexually assaulted. Degawa later reflected this to be the "most horrific" location shoot ever in his life.
- Inherit the will of Princess Diana (ダイアナ元妃の意思を継ぎたい): Matsumoto heads for the removal of landmines buried in Cambodia.
- Matsumura Overseas Animal Confrontation Series (松村海外動物対決シリーズ): Matsumura confronts various dangerous animals like a lion (in Africa), a bear (in Canada), a crocodile (in Australia), a mountain gorilla (in Africa), and komodo dragon (in Indonesia) with a harisen.

== See also ==
- The Contestant (2023 film)
- Hiroiki Ariyoshi
- Bluem of Youth - A J-Pop duo that garnered its biggest success from their involvement with the show.
