= Shirō Sano =

Japanese actor and film director (born 1955)

- 佐野 史郎
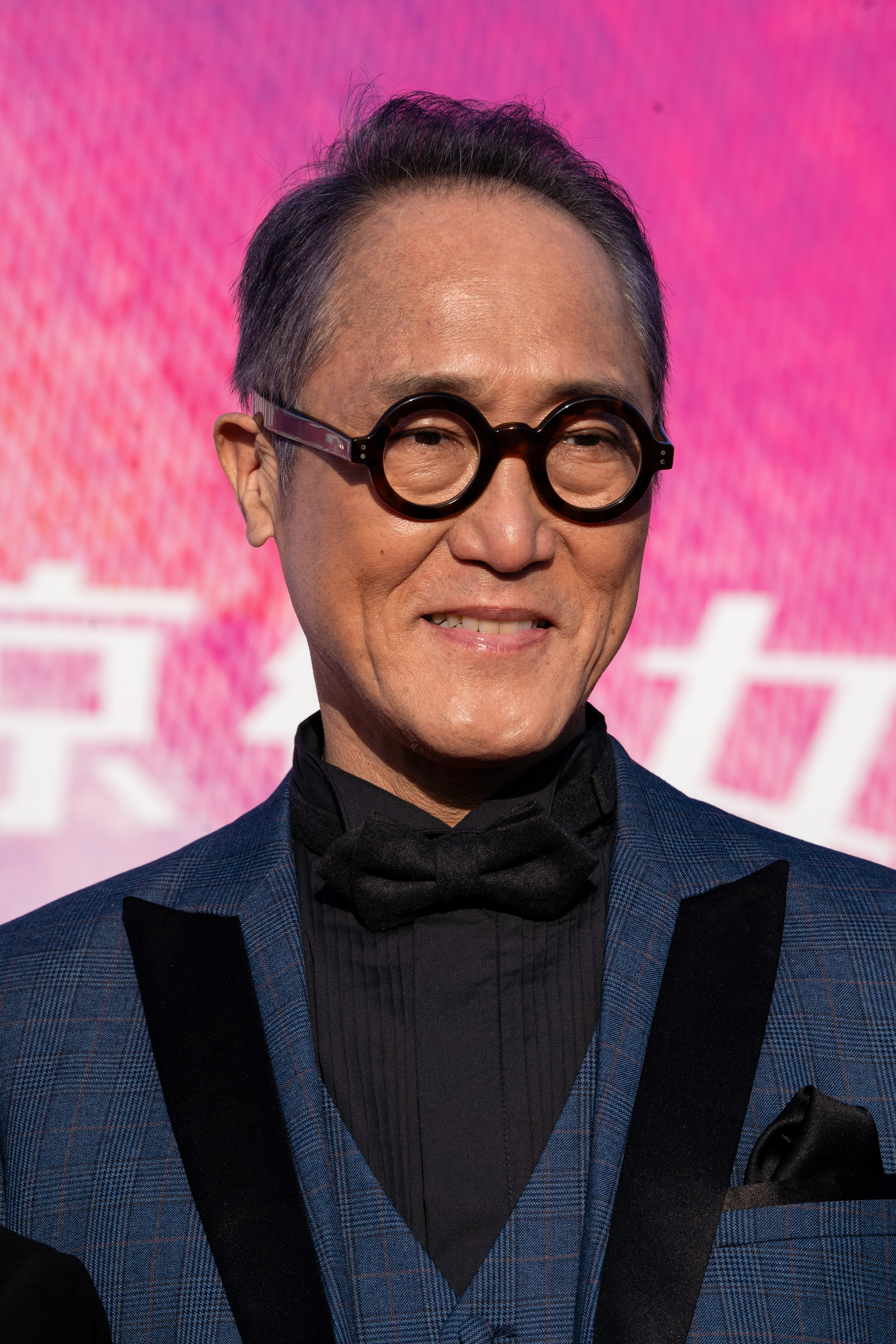
- Sano in 2024
- Born: 4 March 1955 (age 71); Yamanashi, Yamanashi, Japan (Raised: Matsue, Shimane)
- Occupations: Actor, film director, musician
- Years active: 1975–present
- Spouse: Maki Ishikawa
- Website: Kisseidō

Shirō Sano (佐野 史郎, Sano Shirō; born 4 March 1955) is a Japanese actor.

== Career ==
Born in Yamanashi Prefecture, Sano lived in Tokyo and Matsue, Shimane as a child, before returning to Tokyo to enter art school. He joined several theatrical troupes, including Jurō Kara's Jōkyō Gekijō. He had his first starring role in a film in Kaizō Hayashi's To Sleep so as to Dream in 1986, but gained fame for playing the character Fuyuhiko in the television drama Zutto Anata ga Suki datta in 1992. He directed his first film, Karaoke, in 1999.

== Filmography ==
=== Films ===
- To Sleep so as to Dream (1986)
- Tokyo: The Last Megalopolis (1988)
- Tomorrow (1988)
- Violent Cop (1989)
- It's a Summer Vacation Everyday (1994)
- Sharaku (1995)
- Karaoke (1999) (as director)
- Godzilla 2000 (1999)
- The Princess Blade (2001)
- Godzilla, Mothra and King Ghidorah: Giant Monsters All-Out Attack (2001)
- Infection (2004) – Dr. Kiyoshi Akai
- Godzilla: Final Wars (2004)
- The Sun (2005)
- Waiting in the Dark (2006)
- Persona (2008)
- Railways (2010)
- Kaizoku Sentai Gokaiger vs. Space Sheriff Gavan: The Movie (2012) – Chief of Space Police Weeval (Actor)/Makuu Prison Warden Ashurada (Voice)
- Reunion (2012)
- The Millennial Rapture (2012)
- Kamen Rider Heisei Generations: Dr. Pac-Man vs. Ex-Aid & Ghost with Legend Rider (2016) – Michihiko Zaizen (Actor)/Dr. Pac-Man (Voice)/Genomes (Voice)
- Bikuu: Yamigirinochi (2015) - Zesshin
- Nariyuki na Tamashii (2017) – Tadao Tsuge
- Parks (2017) – Professor Inoue
- Roupeiro no Yūutsu (2018)
- My Little Monster (2018)
- We Are Little Zombies (2019), Keiichiro Kamo
- Kishiryu Sentai Ryusoulger the Movie: Time Slip! Dinosaur Panic!! (2019) - Valma
- Fukushima 50 (2020) – Prime Minister of Japan
- Bolt (2020)
- Independence of Japan (2020) – Tatsukichi Minobe
- Hiroshima Piano (2020)
- Nezura 1964 (2021) – Azuma
- Kiba: The Fangs of Fiction (2021)
- Caution, Hazardous Wife: The Movie (2021)
- Intimate Stranger (2022)
- Oshorin (2023)
- Between the White Key and the Black Key (2023)
- Brush of the God (2024)
- Ghosts Dream Selfish Dreams (2024)
- Stolen Identity: Final Hacking Game (2024) – Jung Hak-seon
- Silence of the Sea (2024)
- Happyend (2024), principal Nagai
- Aosho! Voices in Bloom (2025), Takumi Shinome
- Watashi no Mita Sekai (2025)
- Two Seasons, Two Strangers (2025)
- It's a Wonderful Life (2025)
- Magical Secret Tour (2026)
- Hyoketsu (2026)

=== Television ===
- Zutto Anata ga Suki datta (1992)
- Hana no Ran (1994), Ashikaga Yoshimi
- Platonic Sex (2001), Ishikawa
- Vanpaia Hosuto (2004)
- Water Boys 2 (2004)
- Kuitan 2 (2007)
- Clouds Over the Hill (2009–2011), Kuga Katsunan
- Deka Wanko (2011)
- Shizumanu Taiyō (2016)
- Naotora: The Lady Warlord (2017), Sessai Choro
- Spring Has Come (2017)
- Ishitsubute (2017)
- Segodon (2018), Ii Naosuke
- Genkai Danchi (2018), Seiji Terauchi
- San'yūtei Enraku V (2019), Sanyūtei Enshō VI
- Dr. Ashura (2025) – Katsuji Fudō
- The Ghost Writer's Wife (2025–26), Etō
- Shadows of the Ten Ninja (2026), Konchi'in Suden
- The Shogunate Rebel (2027), Hayashi Fukusai

=== Anime ===
- GeGeGe no Kitarō (4th) (1996) – Vampire Elite (ep. 57)

== Discography ==
=== Album ===
- Kimi Ga Sukidayo (君が好きだよ, 1995)
- Sano Shirou To Rice Curry - Shirou Sano with Rice Curry (佐野史郎とライスカレー, 2001)
- Kindan No Kajitsu - Shirou Sano meets SKYE with Masataka Matsutoya (禁断の果実, 2019)
- Album - Shirou Sano with SKYE (2023)
