= Nonoka Ono =

Japanese entertainer and race queen

- おの ののか
- Born: Maria Miyata; December 13, 1991 (age 34); Tokyo, Japan
- Other name: Nonokyan
- Occupations: entertainer; race queen
- Years active: 2012 -
- Agent: Platinum Production
- Height: 1.69 m (5 ft 7 in)
- Spouse: Shinri Shioura (m. 2020)
- Children: 1

Maria Miyata (宮田 真理愛, Miyata Maria; born December 13, 1991, in Tokyo, Japan), better known as Nonoka Ono (おの ののか, Ono Nonoka), is a Japanese entertainer and race queen who is represented by the talent agency, Platinum Production.

Ono is nicknamed Nonokyan (ののきゃん).

== Biography ==
In 2012, Ono started entertainment activities while belonging to Platinum Production. She managed her resume in a coming-of-age ceremony.

On 2013, Ono does race queen activities as a member of Super GT's Zent Sweeties.

On 2014, she became the image model of Tokyo Auto Salon's "A-class". After that, Ono would like to concentrate on the entertainer industry without working as a race queen.

On 2015, her first film appearance was in Ju-On: The Final Curse.

On September 9, 2020, she announced that she is officially married with an Olympic swimmer, Shinri Shioura.

On May 27, 2021, Ono announced that she was pregnant with her first child. On October 29, she gave birth to a healthy baby girl.

== Filmography ==
=== Race queen/Image girl ===
Year	Title	Notes
2013	Super GT "Zent Sweeties"	
2013	Sports Nippon Zaikyō Sports-shi 6-sha Gōdō Unit "Scoop!?"	
2014	Tokyo Auto Salon "A-class"	

=== TV series ===
Regular appearances

Year	Title	Network	Notes	Ref.
2013	Ichiya Zuke	TV Tokyo		
2014	Ura Neta Wide: Deep Night	TV Tokyo	MC	
2015	Fujiyama Fight Club	Fuji TV		

Other appearances

Year	Title	Network	Notes
	Goddotan	TV Tokyo	
	Nobunaga	CBC	
	Sunday Japon	TBS	Irregular appearances
	Geinōjin Kōsei Variety Banana Juku	THK	
	Chakushin Orei! Kētai Ōgiri	NHK	
	Gozenreiji no Takashi Okamura	TBS	
	Moshimo no Simulation Variety Otameshika tsu!	TV Asahi	
	Pu tsu Sma	TV Asahi	
	Quiz 30: Danketsu Seyo!	Fuji TV	
	Tabi Zukin-chan: Zen Nihon no Hoho n Onagokai	CBC	
	Shirushirumishiru-san Day	TV Asahi	
	Masahiro Nakai no mi ni Naru Toshokan	TV Asahi	
	Kensaku Shite wa Ikenai	TBS	
2014	Osare Mon	Fuji TV	
2015	Ariyoshi no Natsuyasumi	Fuji TV	

=== Drama ===
Year	Title	Role	Network	Notes	Ref.
2014	White Lab: Keishichō Tokubetsu Kagaku Sōsahan	Akane Hashimoto	TBS	Episode 7	
2014	Nurse no Oshigoto Saikai-hen	Kanami Murakami	Fuji TV		
2015	Binkan Tantei Jasmine	Yoko Toba	ABC		
2015	37.5°C no Namida	Nanami Kiyota	TBS	Episodes 6 and 7	
2015	Yame Ken no Onna 6	Mika Shimamura	ABC		

=== Films ===
Year	Title	Notes	Ref.
2015	Ju-On: The Final Curse		
2019	School-Live the Movie!	As Sakura Megumi	

=== Radio series ===
Regular appearances

Year	Title	Network	Notes
2014	Appare Yatte Ma ̄su!	MBS Radio	Tuesday

Guest appearances

Year	Title	Network	Notes
2013	Ryuta Mine no Minesuta	Radio Nihon	
2014	Hello World	J-Wave	
2014	Shinbōjirō Zoom Soko Made iu ka!	NBS	
2014	Shunpūteishōta to Inui Kimiko no Radio Beverly Hills	NBS	
2014	Ryota Yamasato no Fumōna Giron	TBS Radio	
2015	Ogiyahagi no Megane-bīki	TBS Radio	
2015	Job Tune R	TBS Radio	

=== Advertisements ===
Year	Title	Notes
	Gyoza no Ohsho	
	Soft 99 "Smooth Egg Micro Whip"	
	Monderīzu Japan "Stride"	
	Kadokawa Games "Derby Stallion"	
	Breathe Right "Hitsuji Nonoka"	
	Aderans "Hair Ikumō Project"	
2015	Media Active "Yakyū-ba Navi"	
2015	Zeria "Shin Uizuwan"	
2015	Fuyu Spo"	
	Haku Moto Earth "Basurabo no Uta"	

=== Gravure activities ===
Year	Title	Notes
2014	Shūkan Gendai	March 2014 Issue
2014	Weekly Young Jump	Issue No. 2 and 12
2014	Shūkan Spa!	
	Weekly Playboy	
	EX Taishū	

=== Events ===
Year	Title	Notes	Ref.
2012	Toyota Gazu Racing Festival 2012 (TGRF 2012)		
2013	Toyota Gazu Racing Festival 2013 (TGRF 2013)		
2014	Tokyo Auto Salon		
2014	Fukuoka Custom Car Show		
2014	Diamond Grove Special Round Girl		
2015	Tokyo Game Show Paon DP Booth de: Bēmon Kingdom		
