= Nasubi =

Japanese comedian (born 1975)

Tomoaki Hamatsu
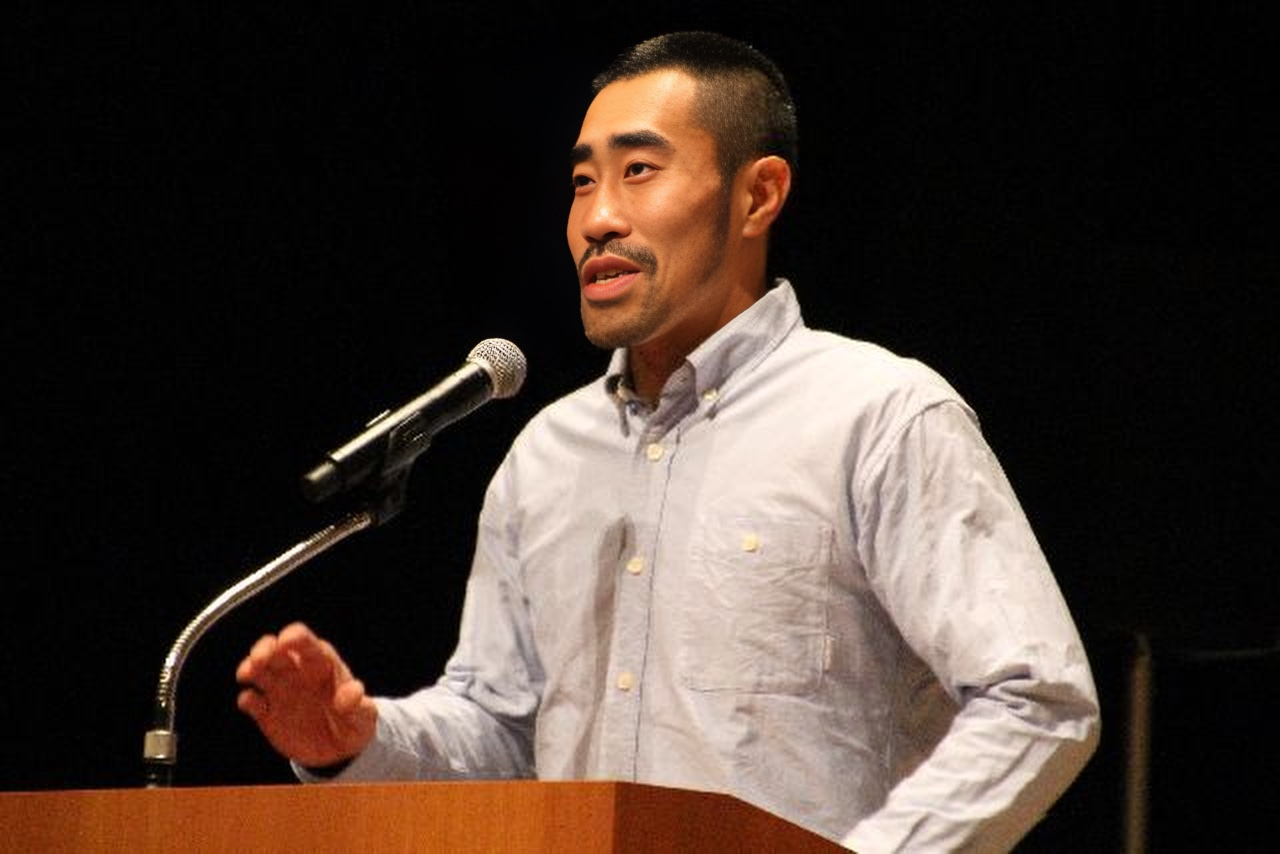
- Hamatsu in 2014
- Born: 3 August 1975 (age 51); Fukushima, Japan
- Other name: Nasubi
- Occupation: Comedian
- Years active: 1998–present
- Agent: Office K
- Known for: Reality television

Tomoaki Hamatsu (浜津 智明, Hamatsu Tomoaki; born 3 August 1975), better known as Nasubi (なすび, "Eggplant"), is a Japanese comedian and media personality. Hamatsu is best known for appearing on the controversial reality television show Susunu! Denpa Shōnen.

== Denpa Shōnen teki Kenshō Seikatsu ==
Hamatsu was challenged to stay alone, unclothed, in an apartment for Susunu! Denpa Shōnen, a Japanese reality-television show on Nippon Television, after winning a lottery for a "showbusiness-related job". Hamatsu was challenged to enter mail-in sweepstakes until he won ¥1 million (about $8,000) in total. Hamatsu started with nothing (including no clothes), was cut off from outside communication and broadcasting, and had nothing to keep him company except the magazines he combed through for sweepstakes entry forms. After spending 335 days to reach the target, he set the Guinness world record for the "longest time survived on competition winnings".

Hamatsu lived in front of the camera, with only the possessions he won via the sweepstakes (save for basic utilities such as running water, heat, and electricity), and the stacks of postcards and magazines required for entering the sweepstakes. Nasubi is the Japanese word for "eggplant"; the nickname was chosen due to his 30 cm long face that was said to be shaped like a Japanese eggplant, as well as the producers having to cover his genitals with an animated eggplant for the television audience when he was standing on camera due to his nudity. Hamatsu believed that he was being recorded and that the show would be re-broadcast later, once the footage had been gathered. In reality, much of the experiment was being live-streamed, with footage compiled and re-aired each week, complete with sound effects present at frequent intervals, using new tech to have 24/7 television to show him live using a joystick to cover up his genitals.

At first, Hamatsu was surviving on a few crackers each day given to him by production staff so that he would not starve to death. Eventually, he won some sugary drinks from his sweepstakes entries, and the crackers were no longer given to him. Later on, Hamatsu won a bag of rice, but having not won any pots or containers with which to heat it, he was forced to eat it raw, but after fashioning a makeshift heating container with a discarded bag, he was able to cook the rice by placing it next to the lit stove; however, canned and kibble dog food became his primary food source for some time after running out of rice. After winning a stuffed toy in a sweepstake, he carried on conversations with it as his sensei, as it was his only sort of interaction, even naming it Bi-nasu. He never won clothing he could wear (only ladies' underwear that was too small for him to use), nor did he ever win anything to trim his growing facial hair and fingernails. Hamatsu also won other prizes he was unable to use, like movie tickets and a bicycle. However, he soon adapted the latter into a stationary bike. When he won a television set, he was unable to use it at first, as there was no cable or antenna hookup in the apartment (intentional by the producers out of fear he would discover he was already on TV). Hamatsu later won a PlayStation game, a copy of the train simulator title Densha de Go!, alongside the controller needed to play it.

By this time, the show had become so popular within Japanese households that people were starting to decipher the location of Hamatsu's flat, with paparazzi, fans, and even the press standing outside without him knowing it. As such, producers were forced to procure a new space far away from the original location. He was transported blindfolded, and upon uncovering his eyes, he discovered a similar living space, along with all his previously won possessions. When Hamatsu questioned if he had completed the challenge, he was instead told the change of space was for his new address for "renewed luck". As such, he continued writing sweepstake entries, with a large chair and desk becoming his first items acquired in his new place he was kept. However, he was moved into yet another space after a long streak of misfortune in his entries. In this new space, Hamatsu's TV set became useful when he later won a VCR, which could be used with two previous tapes he had won, and he would later win a PlayStation. he would end up playing his game for multiple days straight, ultimately forcing himself to stop in order to keep entering sweepstakes, collecting donations & achieving his objectives.

After winning a set of 4 car tires worth around 84000¥ (about $641 in 2024), Hamatsu closed upon his goal, which he finally achieved with a bag of rice, 335 days after starting. After being informed of his victory, he was given back his clothes, blindfolded, and taken to a surprise location. He happily went along, believing he was going to get a special prize for his year of hard work. After they removed his blindfold, he found himself in South Korea. He was given a day at Seoul Land amusement park, where he was able to enjoy Korean barbecue (his favorite food) and ride on the park's multiple attractions. However, after finishing, he was taken to another apartment. Hamatsu was once again asked to take off his clothes and challenged to enter sweepstakes. This time, the goal was to win enough money to afford a flight on Japan Airlines to return home. However, when he quickly met this goal after several weeks of entering competitions, it was revised multiple times, first to afford a ticket in business class, then first class; these goals were also met in a matter of weeks. When he had won enough to return to Japan he was blindfolded, clothed, and taken to another apartment in Japan. When the blindfold was removed, he looked around, and instinctively took his clothes off, expecting to continue the challenge. However, the walls of the apartment fell away to reveal that he was actually in a TV studio with a huge live audience, who began applauding him for succeeding at the challenge. Hamatsu was confused by this, because he thought the show had not yet been broadcast.

The entire ordeal lasted about 15 months (January 1998–April 1999), during which time Hamatsu's diaries on his experience of being isolated from the outside world became a bestseller in Japan. The television show broke numerous viewing records during its run, with 17 million viewers tuning in each Sunday night.

Hamatsu reported being hot and sweaty wearing clothing for the first six months after his ordeal and had difficulty carrying on conversations for a long time.

In April 2020, he tried persuading people to cooperate with the self-disciplined stay-at-home order during the wake of the initial COVID-19 outbreaks by citing his own personal experience with self-isolation.

Hamatsu was the subject of the 2023 documentary, The Contestant.

== Other activities ==
After the rigors Hamatsu went through in order to become a famous comedian, he was unable to succeed in the variety TV world. Instead, he became a local talent in his native Fukushima, as well as a dramatic stage actor, founding the stage troupe Eggplant Way, performing across Japan. He has appeared in Densha Otoko, Trick and Atashinchi no Danshi, and portrayed the character Watcherman in Kamen Rider W. Hamatsu also appeared in the game 428: Shibuya Scramble. He had a small role in Love Exposure.

In 2016, Hamatsu successfully scaled Mount Everest after three aborted attempts in 2013, 2014 and 2015. During his attempt to climb Mount Everest in April 2015, an avalanche occurred after a 7.8 magnitude earthquake struck the region. The avalanche struck a camp at the base of the mountain, claiming the lives of 19 people. He survived and stayed for several weeks to aid in rescue efforts.

== See also ==
- Za Gaman, another popular Japanese game show that also focused on the suffering of contestants.
- The Truman Show, a 1998 American film about a man who is unknowingly the star of a reality television series about his life.
