= Yu Tokui =

Japanese actor (born 1959)

- Born: 28 September 1959 (age 67); Osaka, Japan
- Occupation: Actor
- Years active: 1987–present

Yu Tokui (徳井 優, Tokui Yū; born September 28, 1959) is a Japanese actor. He has appeared in more than 90 films since 1987.

== Selected filmography ==
=== Films ===
Year	Title	Role	Notes	Ref.
1996	Shall We Dance?			
1999	Adrenaline Drive	Yamamoto		
1999	Gakkō no Kaidan 4	Firefighter		
2002	Dark Water	Ōta		
2004	Zebraman			
2007	A Tale of Mari and Three Puppies			
2015	125 Years Memory	Takeshita		
2015	Her Granddaughter			
2016	I Am a Hero	Abesan		
2019	Talking the Pictures			
2020	Underdog			
2021	Your Turn to Kill: The Movie			
2022	Life in Bloom			
2022	Anime Supremacy!			
2022	Kaigan-dōri no Neko-mimi Tantei			
2023	Shylock's Children			
2023	Takano Tofu			
2026	Angel Flight: The Movie	Mitsugu Tanoshita		
2027	Sins of Kujo: The Movie	Kajiya		

=== Television ===
Year	Title	Role	Notes	Ref.
1999	Keizoku			
2004	Part-Time Detective 2	Kazuo Yamagiwa		
2009	Clouds Over the Hill	Police officer Sonoda		
2015	Ultraman X	Yamato Suda		
2018	Segodon	Yamada Tamehisa	Taiga drama	
2019	Your Turn to Kill			
2021	Reach Beyond the Blue Sky	Orita Yōzō	Taiga drama	
2021	Come Come Everybody		Asadora	
2023	Angel Flight	Mitsugu Tanoshita		
2024	Golden Kamuy: The Hunt of Prisoners in Hokkaido	Chōan Kumagishi		
2025	Unbound	Tōhachi	Taiga drama	
