= Last Idol =

Japanese idol girl group

- Also known as: Shinsei Last Idol; My Fav
- Origin: Japan
- Genres: J-pop
- Years active: 2017–2022; 2023–2026
- Label: Universal Japan
- Past members: See former members
- Website: https://lastidol.com/ (dead)

Last Idol (Japanese: ラストアイドル, Hepburn: Rasutoaidoru) was a Japanese idol girl group that formed in 2017 through a music competition show of the same name and disbanded in 2022 due to the impact of the COVID-19 pandemic.

A reboot of the group, named Shinsei Last Idol (新生ラストアイドル) began activities in September 2023. It was renamed My Fav in 2024 and disbanded in 2026.

== History ==
In July 2017, Yasushi Akimoto started planning and recruiting participants for an audition program in order to form a new idol group. The show began airing on TV Asahi from August 13. On December 20, Last Idol's debut single, "Bandwagon", was released.

On February 14, 2018, Last Idol held their first concert. They released their second single, "Kimi no Achoo!", on April 18. Yako Koga, Aya Yoshizaki, and Orin graduated from the group on June 30. Their third single, "Suki de Suki de Shōganai", was released on August 1. Their fourth single, "Everything Will Be All Right", was released on October 24. They released their fifth single, "Ai Shika Buki ga Nai", on December 5.

On April 17, 2019, the group released their sixth single, "Otona Survivor". Natsumi Ishikawa, Asami Enmei, Minori Odanaka, and Honoka Nagai graduated from the group on July 28. Mayu Takahashi graduated from the group on August 6. Their seventh single, "Seishun Train", was released on September 11. Moe Shinoda graduated from the group on September 29. Juria Honjo graduated from the group on December 8. Rio Kiyohara graduated from the group on December 26.

Yuna Tanaka and Natsumi Oishi graduated from the group on March 31, 2020. On April 5, the group released their eighth single, "Ai o Shiru". Himari Kato and Mahiro Yamada graduated from the group on April 5. Reia Inoko graduated from the group on June 30. Their ninth single, "Nanbito mo", was released on November 4. Kana Asahi and Shuri Nakamura graduated from the group on December 31.

Misaki Kimura graduated from the group on February 28, 2021. On April 28, the group released their tenth single, "Kimi wa Nan Carat?". Midori Nagatsuki and Hinako Iwama graduated from the group on July 31. Moe Suto graduated from the group on August 4. Their eleventh single, "Break a Leg!" on December 8. Mana Mizuno graduated from the group on December 31.

Honoka Machida graduated from the group on January 31, 2022. On March 9, it was announced that Last Idol would disband on May 31 due to the effects of the COVID-19 pandemic. On April 27, the group released their only studio album, Last Album.

Last Idol was rebooted in March 2023 and resumed activities in September 2023 as Shinsei Last Idol (新生ラストアイドル; lit. 'New Last Idol'). In June 2024, the group was renamed My Fav. It disbanded in March 2026, with a final lineup of six members.

== Former members ==
- Yako Koga (古賀哉子; graduated June 30, 2018)
- Aya Yoshizaki (吉崎綾; graduated June 30, 2018)
- Orin (王林; graduated June 30, 2018)
- Natsumi Ishikawa (石川夏海; graduated July 28, 2019)
- Asami Enmei (延命杏咲実; graduated July 28, 2019)
- Minori Odanaka (小田中穂; graduated July 28, 2019)
- Honoka Nagai (永井穂花; graduated July 28, 2019)
- Mayu Takahashi (高橋真由; graduated August 6, 2019)
- Moe Shinoda (篠田萌; graduated September 29, 2019)
- Juria Honjo (本城珠莉亜; graduated December 8, 2019)
- Rio Kiyohara (清原梨央; graduated December 26, 2019)
- Yuna Tanaka (田中佑奈; graduated March 31, 2020)
- Natsumi Oishi (大石夏摘; graduated March 31, 2020)
- Himari Kato (加藤ひまり; graduated April 5, 2020)
- Mahiro Yamada (山田まひろ; graduated April 5, 2020)
- Reia Inoko (猪子れいあ; graduated June 30, 2020)
- Kana Asahi (朝日花奈; graduated December 31, 2020)
- Shuri Nakamura (中村守里; graduated December 31, 2020)
- Misaki Kimura (木村美咲; graduated February 28, 2021)
- Midori Nagatsuki (長月翠; graduated July 31, 2021)
- Hinako Iwama (岩間妃南子; graduated July 31, 2021)
- Moe Suto (首藤百慧; graduated August 4, 2021)
- Mana Mizuno (水野舞菜; graduated December 31, 2021)
- Honoka Machida (町田穂花; graduated January 31, 2022)
- Nanami Abe (阿部菜々実; graduated May 31, 2022)
- Haruka Suzuki (鈴木遥夏; graduated May 31, 2022)
- Airi Yasuda (安田愛里; graduated May 31, 2022)
- Ruka Aizawa (相澤瑠香; graduated May 31, 2022)
- Airi Ikematsu (池松愛理; graduated May 31, 2022)
- Aimi Ozawa (小澤愛実; graduated May 31, 2022)
- Momona Matsumoto (松本ももな; graduated May 31, 2022)
- Wakana Majima (間島和奏; graduated May 31, 2022)
- Himeri Momiyama (籾山ひめり; graduated May 31, 2022)
- Rio Ohmori (大森莉緒; graduated May 31, 2022)
- Honoka Nishimura (西村歩乃果; graduated May 31, 2022)
- Airi Yamamoto (山本愛梨; graduated May 31, 2022)
- Yume Oba (大場結女; graduated May 31, 2022)
- Mao Kurita (栗田麻央; graduated May 31, 2022)
- Kokoro Sasaki (佐佐木一心; graduated May 31, 2022)
- Karin Shimoma (下間花梨; graduated May 31, 2022)
- Momoko Hashimoto (橋本桃呼; graduated May 31, 2022)
- Misaki Hata (畑美紗起; graduated May 31, 2022)
- Runa Yamamoto (山本琉愛; graduated May 31, 2022)
- Sakura Utagawa (宇田川桜夢; graduated May 31, 2022)
- Mana Okamura (岡村茉奈; graduated May 31, 2022)
- Yuuki Okumura (奥村優希; graduated May 31, 2022)
- Chisato Kizaki (木﨑千聖; graduated May 31, 2022)
- Sayaka Kubota (久保田沙矢香; graduated May 31, 2022)
- Nozomi Shinohara (篠原望; graduated May 31, 2022)
- Mana Shiraishi (白石真菜; graduated May 31, 2022)
- Miho Takagi (高木美穂; graduated May 31, 2022)
- Minori Takahashi (高橋みのり; graduated May 31, 2022)
- Mimi Takahashi (髙橋美海; graduated May 31, 2022)
- Yume Miyata (宮田有萌; graduated May 31, 2022)
- Miina Yoneda (米田みいな; graduated May 31, 2022)

== Sub-units ==
- LaLuce: Airi Yasuda, Aya Yoshizaki, Haruka Suzuki, Midori Nagatsuki, Nanami Abe, Natsumi Oishi, Yako Koga
- Good Tears: Airi Ikematsu, Kana Asahi, Mayu Takahashi, Orin, Ruka Aizawa
- Choux Cream Rockets (シュークリームロケッツ): Aimi Ozawa, Midori Nagatsuki, Momona Matsumoto
- Someday Somewhere: Himeri Momiyama, Mahiro Yamada, Misaki Kimura, Reia Inoko, Rio Kiyohara, Wakana Majima
- Love Cocchi: Airi Yamamoto, Honoka Nishimura, Natsumi Ishikawa, Rio Ohmori, Shuri Nakamura

== Discography ==
=== Studio albums ===
List of studio albums, with selected details, chart positions and sales
Title	Details	Peak chart positions		Sales
Title	Details	JPN	JPN Hot	Sales
Last Album	Released: April 27, 2022; Label: Universal Japan; Formats: CD, digital download, streaming	1	1	JPN: 61,621

=== Singles ===
List of singles, with selected chart positions, showing year released, certifications and album name
Title	Year	Peak chart positions		Certifications	Album
Title	Year	JPN	JPN Hot	Certifications	Album
"Bandwagon" (バンドワゴン)	2017	4	6		Last Album
"Kimi no Achoo!" (君のAchoo!)	2018	2	5		Last Album
"Suki de Suki de Shōganai" (好きで好きでしょうがない)	2018	8	15		Last Album
"Everything Will Be All Right"	2018	4	9		Last Album
"Ai Shika Buki ga Nai" (愛しか武器がない)	2018	5	14		Last Album
"Otona Survivor" (大人サバイバー)	2019	1	1	RIAJ: Gold (phy.)	Last Album
"Seishun Train" (青春トレイン)	2019	3	4	RIAJ: Gold (phy.)	Last Album
"Ai o Shiru" (愛を知る)	2020	1	3		Last Album
"Nanbito mo" (何(なん)人(びと)も)	2020	3	4	RIAJ: Gold (phy.)	Last Album
"Kimi wa Nan Carat?" (君は何キャラット?)	2021	2	12		Last Album
"Break a Leg!"	2021	3	9	RIAJ: Gold (phy.)	Last Album
