= List of films about curses =

This is a list of films about curses:

== A ==
Title	Director	Year	Notes
All Saints Eve	Gerry Lively	2015	
Anastasia	Don Bluth and Gary Goldman	1997	
And Now the Screaming Starts!	Roy Ward Baker	1973	
Anselmi: The Young Werewolf	Matti Pekkanen	2014	
The Anthem of the Heart	Tatsuyuki Nagai	2015	
Antlers	Scott Cooper	2021	
Antrum: The Deadliest Film Ever Made	David Amito and Michael Laicini	2018	
Aquaman and the Lost Kingdom	James Wan	2023	
Army of the Dead	Joseph Conti	2008	

== B ==
Title	Director	Year	Notes
Ballabhpurer Roopkotha (বল্লভপুরের রূপকথা)	Anirban Bhattacharya	2022	
El banquete	Michs Carbajal	2024	
The Barn	Justin M. Seaman	2016	
Beastly	Daniel Barnz	2011	
Beauty and the Beast	Gary Trousdale, Kirk Wise	1991	
Beauty and the Beast	Bill Condon	2017	
Bell Witch: The Movie	Shane Marr	2007	
Bhool Bhulaiyaa	Priyadarshan	2007	
Big Trouble in Little China	John Carpenter	1986	
The Black Room	Roy William Neill	1935	
Blackbeard's Ghost	Robert Stevenson	1968	
Blast Vegas	Jack Perez	2013	
Bride of the Gorilla	Curt Siodmak	1951	
Bunshinsaba	Byeong-ki Ahn	2004	
The Bye Bye Man	Stacy Title	2017	

== C ==
Title	Director	Year	Notes
Carved: The Slit-Mouthed Woman	Koji Shiraishi	2007	
Casting the Runes (Playhouse)	Lawrence Gordon Clark	1979	
Chamatkar	Rajiv Mehra	1992	
Christine	John Carpenter	1983	
Clown	Jon Watts	2014	
The Conjuring		2013	
CrossBones	Daniel Zirilli	2005	
Curse III: Blood Sacrifice	Sean Barton	1991	
The Curse of Bridge Hollow	Jeff Wadlow	2022	
The Curse of the Moon Child	Mahfuzah Issy	1972	
Curse of Simba	Lindsay Shonteff	1965	
The Curse of Sleeping Beauty	Pearry Reginald Teo	2016	
Curse of the Blood	Kazuo Hase	1968	
The Curse of the Cat People	Gunther von Fritsch, Robert Wise	1944	
The Curse of the Doll People	Benito Alazraki	1961	
The Curse of the Mummy's Tomb	Michael Carreras	1964	
Curse of the Undead	Michael Pate, Kathleen Crowley	1959	
The Curse of the Werewolf	Terence Fisher	1961	
Curse of the Witching Tree	James Crow	2015	
Cursed	Wes Craven	2005	
The Cursed	Sean Ellis	2021	

== D ==
Title	Director	Year	Notes
Dabbe: Cin Çarpması	Hasan Karacadağ	2013	
Dark August	Martin Goldman	1976	
Dark Shadows	Tim Burton	2012	
Dark Water (仄暗い水の底から)	Hideo Nakata	2002	
Darkness	Jaume Balagueró	2002	
Darkness Falls	Jonathan Liebesman	2003	
The Demon (Il demonio)	Brunello Rondi	1963	
Densen Uta (伝染歌)	Masato Harada	2007	
Descendants 3	Kenny Ortega	2019	
Devil in My Ride	Gary Michael Schultz	2013	
The Devil's Nightmare	Jean Brismée	1971	
The Devil's Rain	Robert Fuest	1975	
The Devonsville Terror	Ulli Lommel	1983	
Desaparecer por completo	Luis Javier Henaine	2022	
Don't Go Near the Park	Lawrence D. Foldes	1979	
Double, Double, Toil and Trouble	Stuart Margolin	1993	
Dracula in the Provinces	Lucio Fulci	1975	
Drag Me to Hell	Sam Raimi	2009	
Dragonheart 3: The Sorcerer's Curse	Colin Teague	2015	

== E ==
Title	Director	Year	Notes
Ella Enchanted	Tommy O'Haver	2004	
Endless Night	Sidney Gilliat	1972	
La Entidad	Eduardo Schuldt	2015	
Ernest Scared Stupid	John R. Cherry III	1991	
The Eternal Evil of Asia (南洋十大邪術)	Man Kei Chin	1995	
The Exorcism	Joshua John Miller	2024	

== F ==
Title	Director	Year	Notes
Fantastic Beasts and Where to Find Them	David Yates	2016	
Fantastic Beasts: The Crimes of Grindelwald	David Yates	2018	
Fantastic Beasts: The Secrets of Dumbledore	David Yates	2022	
Far North	Asif Kapadia	2007	
Fear Street Part One: 1994	Leigh Janiak	2021	
Fear Street Part Three: 1666	Leigh Janiak	2021	
Fear Street Part Two: 1978	Leigh Janiak	2021	
The Four Skulls of Jonathan Drake	Edward L. Cahn	1959	
Frozen	Chris Buck, Jennifer Lee	2013	
Fury of the Demon	Fabien Delage	2016	

== G ==
Title	Director	Year	Notes
Ghost Fever	Alan Smithee	1987	
Ghosts of War	Eric Bress	2020	
Good Luck Chuck	Mark Helfrich	2007	
Grave Robbers	Rubén Galindo Jr.	1990	
The Gravedancers	Mike Mendez	2006	
The Grudge	Takashi Shimizu	2004	
The Grudge	Nicolas Pesce	2019	
The Grudge 2	Takashi Shimizu	2006	
The Grudge 3	Toby Wilkins	2009	
Gul-E-Bakawali	D. M. Pancholi	1939	

== H ==
Title	Director	Year	Notes
Harry Potter and the Philosopher's Stone	Chris Columbus	2001	
Harry Potter and the Chamber of Secrets	Chris Columbus	2002	
Harry Potter and the Prisoner of Azkaban	Alfonso Cuarón	2004	
Harry Potter and the Goblet of Fire	Mike Newell	2005	
Harry Potter and the Order of the Phoenix	David Yates	2007	
Harry Potter and the Half-Blood Prince	David Yates	2009	
Harry Potter and the Deathly Hallows – Part 1	David Yates	2010	
Harry Potter and the Deathly Hallows – Part 2	David Yates	2011	
Halloween: The Curse of Michael Myers	Joe Chappelle	1995	
Haunted	Michael DeGaetano	1977	
The Haunted Mansion	Rob Minkoff	2003	
He's a Dragon (Он – дракон)	Indar Dzhendubaev	2015	
Hex	Leo Garen	1973	
Hocus Pocus	Kenny Ortega	1993	
Hocus Pocus 2	Anne Fletcher	2022	
Holes	Andrew Davis	2003	
Hollow	Michael Axelgaard	2011	
Howl's Moving Castle	Hayao Miyazaki	2004	

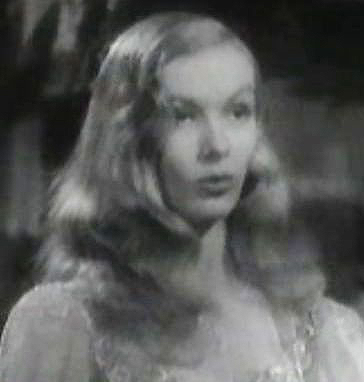
Veronica Lake in I Married a Witch

== I ==
Title	Director	Year	Notes
I Don't Want to Be Born	Peter Sasdy	1975	
I Married a Witch	René Clair	1942	
Inland Empire	David Lynch	2006	
Into the Woods	Rob Marshall	2014	
It Follows	David Robert Mitchell	2014	

== J ==
Title	Director	Year	Notes
Ju-On: The Curse	Takashi Shimizu	2000	
Ju-On: The Curse 2	Takashi Shimizu	2000	
Ju-On: The Grudge	Takashi Shimizu	2002	
Ju-On: The Grudge 2	Takashi Shimizu	2003	
Jinxed	Stephen Herek	2013	
Johnny Frank Garrett's Last Word	Simon Rumley	2016	
Ju-On: The Beginning of the End	Masayuki Ochiai	2014	
Ju-On: Black Ghost	Mari Asato	2009	
Ju-On: The Final Curse	Masayuki Ochiai	2015	
Ju-On: White Ghost	Ryuta Miyake	2009	
Jujutsu Kaisen 0	Sunghoo Park	2021	
Jungle Cruise	Jaume Collet-Serra	2021	
Junoon	Mahesh Bhatt	1992	

== K ==
Title	Director	Year	Notes
Kaidan	Hideo Nakata	2007	
Kalki 2898 AD	Nag Ashwin	2024	
The Killing of a Sacred Deer	Yorgos Lanthimos	2017	
The Kiss	Pen Densham	1988	

== L ==
Title	Director	Year	Notes
The Last Witch Hunter	Breck Eisner	2015	
The Lighthouse	Robert Eggers	2019	
The Lord of the Rings: The Fellowship of the Ring	Peter Jackson	2001	
The Lords of Salem	Rob Zombie	2012	
Lucky	Casey Burke Leonard	2019	TV

== M ==
Title	Director	Year	Notes
Madres	Ryan Zaragoza	2021	
Maleficent	Robert Stromberg	2014	
Manichitrathazhu	Fazil	1993	
Mannequin	Michael Gottlieb	1987	
Mannequin Two: On the Move	Stewart Raffill	1991	
Metamorphosis	Kim Hong-seon	2019	
The Midnight Hour	Jack Bender	1985	TV
Mirrors	Alexandre Aja	2008	
Moana 2	David Derrick Jr., Jason Hand, Dana Ledoux Mille	2024	
The Monkey	Oz Perkins	2025	
The Mummy	Karl Freund	1932	
The Mummy Theme Park	Alvaro Passeri	2000	
The Mummy	Terence Fisher	1959	
My Demon Lover	Charlie Loventhal	1987	

== N ==
Title	Director	Year	Notes
Nahuel and the Magic Book	Germán Acuña Delgadillo	2020	
Night of the Demon	Jacques Tourneur	1957	
A Night to Dismember	Doris Wishman	1983	
Nokturno	Mikhail Red	2024	
The Nutcracker Prince	Paul Schibli	1990	

== O ==
Title	Director	Year	Notes
Oculus	Mike Flanagan	2013	
Oedipus Rex	Pier Paolo Pasolini	1967	
One Missed Call	Takashi Miike	2003	
One Missed Call 2	Renpei Tsukamoto	2005	
One Missed Call: Final	Manabu Asou	2006	
Open Season: Scared Silly	David Feiss	2015	
Ouija: Origin of Evil	Mike Flanagan	2016	

== P ==
Title	Director	Year	Notes
Paganini Horror	Luigi Cozzi	1989	
Patayin sa Sindak si Barbara	Chito S. Roño	1995	
Penelope	Mark Palansky	2006	
Pharaoh's Curse	Richard H. Landau	1957	
Pirates of the Caribbean: The Curse of the Black Pearl	Gore Verbinski	2003	
Practical Magic	Griffin Dunne	1998	
The Princess and the Frog	John Musker, Ron Clements	2009	
Princess Arete	Sunao Katabuchi	2001	
Princess Mononoke	Hayao Miyazaki	1997	
Purana Mandir	Ramsay Brothers	1984	

== R ==
Title	Director	Year	Notes
Ringu リング	Chisui Takigawa	1995	TV
The Ring	Hideo Nakata	1998	
Ring 2	Hideo Nakata	1999	
The Ring	Gore Verbinski	2002	
The Ring Two	Hideo Nakata	2005	
Rings	F. Javier Gutiérrez	2017	
Ragini MMS 2	Bhushan Patel	2014	
Remington and the Curse of the Zombadings	Jade Castro	2011	
El Retorno de Walpurgis	Carlos Aured	1973	
Rockula	Luca Bercovici	1990	
Room 203	Ben Jagger	2022	
R.L. Stine's Pumpkinhead	Jem Garrard	2025	

== S ==
Title	Director	Year	Notes
Sadako bāsasu Kayako (貞子 vs 伽椰子)	Kōji Shiraishi	2016	
Smile	Parker Finn	2022	
Smile 2	Parker Finn	2024	
Sadako	Hideo Nakata	2012	
Sadako DX	Hisashi Kimura	2013	
Satan's Cheerleaders	Greydon Clark	1977	
Saturday the 14th	Howard R. Cohen	1981	
Scooby-Doo on Zombie Island	Jim Stenstrum	1998	
Season of the Witch	Dominic Sena	2011	
The Secret of the Blue Room	Kurt Neumann	1933	
Shaapit	Vikram Bhatt	2010	
The Shadow of the Desert	George Archainbaud	1924	
Shrek	Andrew Adamson	2001	
Shrek 2	Andrew Adamson	2004	
Silent Night, Deadly Night 4: Initiation	Brian Yuzna	1990	
The Sleep Curse	Herman Yau	2017	
Sleeping Beauty	Wolfgang Reitherman, Eric Larson, Les Clark	1959	
Sleeping Beauty	David Irving	1987	
Someone Behind You	Oh Ki-hwan	2007	
Spectre	Scott Levy	1996	
Spirited Away	Hayao Miyazaki	2001	
Stigma	Lawrence Gordon Clark	1977	
Straight Outta Nowhere: Scooby-Doo! Meets Courage the Cowardly Dog	Cecilia Aranovich Hamilton	2021	

== T ==
Title	Director	Year	Notes
Tarot	Spenser Cohen, Anna Halberg	2024	
Terror	Norman J. Warren	1978	
There Will Be Blood	Paul Thomas Anderson	2007	
Thinner	Tom Holland	1996	
Tom Thumb and Little Red Riding Hood	Roberto Rodríguez	1962	
Tower of Terror	D. J. MacHale	1997	
Truth or Dare	Jeff Wadlow	2018	
Tumbbad	Rahi Anil Barve	2018	
Turning Red	Domee Shi	2022	

== U ==
Title	Director	Year	Notes
Undead or Alive: A Zombedy	Glasgow Phillips	2007	
The Undying Monster	John Brahm	1942	

== W ==
Title	Director	Year	Notes
The Wailing	Na Hong-jin	2016	
Wallace & Gromit: The Curse of the Were-Rabbit	Nick Park, Steve Box	2005	
Werewolves on Wheels	Michel Levesque	1971	
The Witch's Curse	Riccardo Freda	1962	
The Witches	Nicolas Roeg	1990	
The Witches	Robert Zemeckis	2020	
Wolf Man	Leigh Whannell	2025	

== Z ==
Title	Director	Year	Notes
Zapatlela	Mahesh Kothare	1993	

== See also ==
- List of films about witchcraft
