= List of The Haunting Hour: The Series episodes =

R. L. Stine's The Haunting Hour title screen

R. L. Stine's The Haunting Hour: The Series is an original anthology horror-fantasy series that originally aired on Discovery Family. The first two episodes of the series were broadcast on October 29, 2010, with the rest of the season beginning on December 25, 2010. Some episodes in the series are based on stories from R. L. Stine's anthologies The Haunting Hour and Nightmare Hour, while others come from different sources. On December 6, 2014, it was confirmed by Stine via Twitter that Discovery Family dropped the show after its run of four seasons.

== Series overview ==
| Season | Episodes | Originally released | |
| Season | Episodes | First released | Last released |
|---|---|---|---|
| 1 | 22 | October 29, 2010 | May 14, 2011 |
| 2 | 18 | October 1, 2011 | February 4, 2012 |
| 3 | 26 | October 13, 2012 | December 21, 2013 |
| 4 | 10 | October 4, 2014 | November 29, 2014 |

== Episodes ==
=== Season 1 (2010–11) ===
| No. overall | No. in season | Title | Directed by | Written by | Original release date |
|---|---|---|---|---|---|
| 1 | 1 | "Really You" (Part 1) | Neill Fearnley | Billy Brown & Dan Angel | October 29, 2010 |
Part 1 of 2. Lilly (Bailee Madison) is given her very own life-sized "Really You" doll, Lilly D. (performed by Jeny Cassady). Soon after, strange events begin to occur that Lilly's mother accuses Lilly of causing; Lilly maintains she is innocent, and that Lilly D. is alive. Soon, Lilly's mother starts to care more about Lilly D. than Lilly, even letting it "sleep" in her bed. Lilly's brother Brandon (Connor Price) becomes determined to prove Lilly D. is alive, or isn't.
| 2 | 2 | "Really You" (Part 2) | Neill Fearnley | Billy Brown & Dan Angel | October 29, 2010 |
Part 2 of 2. Brandon suspects the doll is trying to get rid of Lilly. Brandon and his friend, Josh (Casey Dubois), go to the "Really You" doll maker (Gabrielle Rose) and she explains that all of the dolls have souls. When the doll switches places with Lilly, Brandon notices that the discarded doll thrown in the trash has Lilly's birthmark on the back of its neck. When Lilly's mom (Alisen Down) expresses unconditional love for her real daughter, Lilly is restored to her human self and the doll, coincidentally, is hit by a garbage truck. The doll is later found on the street by two girls. It grabs one of the girls, causing them to run away in horror.
| 3 | 3 | "A Creature Was Stirring" | Terry Ingram | James Thorpe | December 25, 2010 |
All Timmy (Thomas Robinson) wants for Christmas is for his soon-to-be-divorced parents to stop bickering and a Krampus-like creature (performed by Jeny Cassady) may be the solution to the family's strife. In the end, it turned out that the creature was helping Santa Claus to grant Timmy's wish of getting his parents back together.
| 4 | 4 | "The Dead Body" | James Head | Scott Thomas & Jed Elinoff | December 25, 2010 |
Will Johnston (Brendan Meyer) strikes a deal with Jake Skinner (Matt Angel), the new kid, to take care of some bullies. Will soon learns Jake is a ghost: he died in a fire because of some bullies. They go back in time to the day Jake was going to die. Will saves Jake, only to realize that he'd been tricked. When Will perishes in the fire that had killed Jake, Jake begins the rest of his life again while Will takes Jake's place and becomes the ghost.
| 5 | 5 | "Nightmare Inn" | Neill Fearnley | Katherine Boutry | January 8, 2011 |
Jillian (Madeline Carroll) is forced to face her fears in a strange inn where the staff is keeping a secret. At night, the staff of the inn are revealed to be werewolves who wish to devour her. She is saved by another werewolf who might just be her father.
| 6 | 6 | "The Red Dress" | J. B. Sugar | Jed Elinoff & Scott Thomas | January 15, 2011 |
Jamie (Linda Tomassone) is a lowly country club worker who has a crush on a member of the club named Zack (Ryan McDonell). She and her friend Nicole (Eve Harlow) come upon a mysterious thrift store called "The Raven's Chest" owned by a blind woman named Abigail Raven (Emmanuelle Vaugier). In it, she sees a beautiful red dress that she regards as too expensive with it costing $400. Later that night, she steals the dress and wears it to a dance in order to impress Zack. Abigail starts stalking her to make her "pay". That night at the dance, Jamie appears wearing the red dress. She is stunning and catches the eyes of everyone there, but most importantly, she catches the eyes of Zack, who immediately asks her for a dance. Jamie finally has what she wants, but can't seem to enjoy her time because everywhere she looks she sees Abigail coming after her. Guilt begins to consume Jamie as she flees the dance and goes home. While standing outside her bedroom, she spots the Raven from "The Raven's Chest". Jamie timidly tells Abigail that she can have the dress back because she no longer wants it, but it is far too late. A hand snatches Jamie from her room and pulls her inside as she lets out a scream. The next morning after a call from Nicole about what happened last night, Jamie soon finds that she is inexplicably blind as she can only see darkness upon waking up and can't find her glasses causing her to scream in horror. At "The Raven's Chest", Abigail gains Jamie's glasses (which she puts into a display case at her store) and her own eyesight back saying "Everyone must pay."
| 7 | 7 | "Ghostly Stare" | Neill Fearnley | Jack Monaco | January 29, 2011 |
Lauren (Emma Grabinsky) and Mark (Jason Spevack) learn that when cemeteries are disturbed, not everything stays buried. A ghost replaces Mark when he falls into a grave. Lauren sets off to get her brother back. In a twist ending, Lauren is replaced with a ghost named Alice Clairborne as the real Lauren had died.
| 8 | 8 | "Walls" | Michael Scott | Philip Levens | February 5, 2011 |
Jeffrey (Bobby Coleman) realizes that not everyone moves out before someone else moves in. There is something in the walls of the new house into which he and his parents move. It turns out that his parents knew all along that there was a creature in the walls. They say that the ugly old creature called a klemit (Matt Phillips) causes good fortune and has a strong sweet tooth while the old man who previously lived in the house died while dating a twenty-nine-year-old woman. When Jeffrey threatens to tell people about it, his parents allow him to have a sleepover in their room while watching their flat-screen television. Of course, his parents have a hard time sleeping when the klemit is pestering them for syrup.
| 9 | 9 | "Game Over" | Terry Ingram | Jed Elinoff & Scott Thomas | February 12, 2011 |
Kelly "Kell-razer" (Calum Worthy) and his friend Gooch (AJ Lutsky) receive a mysteriously new game called Zee Town that they got from a stranger named the Game Master (voiced by David Sobolov). However, it turns out this game sucks its players into a live-action game world in which said players can actually die. As they team up with their new-found allies Sean (Johnny Ji) and Mika (Diana Sadat), they must all fight their way out as that is the only way to survive. In a twist ending, Kelly ends up in the game as the new Game Master because he has defeated the old Game Master. Whoever beats him sets him free, trapping the next winner inside in a continuous cycle.
| 10 | 10 | "Alien Candy" | Neill Fearnley | Melody Fox | February 19, 2011 |
Walt (Grayson Russell) and his best friend Tim (Baljodh Nagra) are sixth graders who are obsessed with aliens. When two strange eighth graders named Bonnie (Jessica McLeod) and Greg (Matthew Knight) ask Walt to join their secret alien club, he eagerly accepts. However, it turns out that Bonnie and Greg are real aliens that only wanted Walt to join so they could eat him. After taking a bite out of his toe, they realize that Walt is actually a redhead with dyed hair. Because they are allergic to redheads, the aliens decide to eat Tim. Walt and Tim defeat the aliens by throwing salt on them which causing water to leave the body owing to osmosis. The cafeteria cook accidentally bakes the aliens' melted bodies into the school's chicken nuggets. Walt and Tim discover the aliens' pieces inside and scream in horror.
| 11 | 11 | "Fear Never Knocks" | Peter DeLuise | Gillian Horvath | February 26, 2011 |
Fears become real when the grandchildren of a decorated psychiatrist named George (Matthew Walker) play around with an ancient recorder in their grandfather's office. It turns out the recorder called the Box of Fears was brought to their grandfather by Fear itself (Christopher Heyerdahl) thirty-five years earlier. Now, with Grandpa George retiring, Fear returns, wanting back the box so that he can unleash upon the world all the dark fears stored inside. One of the children, Jenny (Ariel Winter), tricks Fear into getting sucked into the box by saying she is afraid of Fear itself. The box disappears, presumably along with Fear.
| 12 | 12 | "Best Friend Forever" | Jason Furukawa | Erik Patterson & Jessica Scott | March 5, 2011 |
Jack (Nolan Gould) accidentally raises a zombie (Chris Cochrane) from the dead, but instead of getting help, he keeps it as a pet. In the end, the zombie kidnaps Jack and he becomes the pet of the zombie.
| 13 | 13 | "Black Mask" | Neill Fearnley | Melody Fox | March 12, 2011 |
A mask tells of a very bad past, so Julie (Madison Pettis) and Bill (Ricardo Hoyos), set off to change the past of the kids who they believe died. In the end, the kids seen through the mask were actually Julie and Bill themselves. The man they believed would kill them was just the handyman (Nicholas W. von Zill) who was trying to fix the furnace. The mask enables their friend Robb (Ian Crane) to save the handyman when an explosion in the furnace causes the beam they thought would crush them to fall on him. Robb shoves both himself and the handyman out of the way. They realize that the mask shows the future instead of the past.
| 14 | 14 | "Afraid of Clowns" | Peter DeLuise | Jed Elinoff & Scott Thomas | March 19, 2011 |
Clowns are no laughing matter to Chris (Jake Cherry) who has a strange feeling that the local carnival clowns are stalking him. It is shown that they are, in fact, stalking him. It is revealed that his parents have been clowns forever and now, so is he.
| 15 | 15 | "My Sister the Witch" | Michael Scott | Philip Levens | March 26, 2011 |
When boy scout Pete (Uriah Shelton) welcomes his teenage sister Alice (Jodelle Ferland) home from boarding school, his best friend Reggie (Mitchell Duffield) believes she is a witch. It is revealed that Alice met a beginner witch named Enid at her boarding school who told her she was cursed. Alice suspects that it is a Saired Curse, a curse that is said to first start with misfortune, then steals wealth, health, sanity, and finally life. It ends up being William Merrit (Julian LeBlanc), an older boy scout who vowed revenge after Alice read one of his love-notes out loud so he would leave her alone. After a short magical battle, he is turned into a toad.
| 16 | 16 | "Wrong Number" | Neill Fearnley | Erik Patterson & Jessica Scott | April 2, 2011 |
The two meanest girls at school named Steffani Howard (Debby Ryan) and Taylor Turner (Sarah Dugdale) are known to make fun of a goth girl named Adriana (Kacey Rohl). One night, Steffani and Taylor play loud music, which Steffani's elderly next door neighbor Mrs. Biazevich (Karin Konoval) complains about. Mrs. Biazevich warns them to be nice girls, then attacks Steffani and takes her hair barrette. Steffani retaliates by crank calling Mrs. Biazevich, who again warns her and Taylor to be nice. The next day, after Mrs. Biazevich dies, Steffani and Taylor start receiving disturbing text messages telling them to be nice girls from Mrs. Biazevich's phone. The next day, Steffani and Taylor go to Adriana for help in order to get rid of Mrs. Biazevich's ghost (who continues to haunt them for being mean girls). Adriana enlists her uncle Constantine (Andrew Kavadas) who gives the girls leaves to spread around Steffani's bedroom to protect them from the ghost. Once Steffani and Taylor spread the leaves around the room, the leaves only attract Mrs. Biazevich's ghost and attacks the girls. Mrs. Biazevich spares Taylor because she can see good in her heart, but sees that Steffani is rotten to the core, especially when she takes back her apology by insulting Mrs. Biazevich after promising to be nice. Mrs. Biazevich traps Steffani in a video on her cellphone and sends it to her granddaughter, who is revealed to be Adriana. It turns out that Adriana, Constantine, and Biazevich planned the whole thing. As the episode ends, Adriana says Steffani will never mess with her again and deletes Steffani, completely erasing her from existence.
| 17 | 17 | "Catching Cold" | Peter DeLuise | Neal Shusterman | April 9, 2011 |
After getting a taste of the amazingly delicious Kreemy Kold ice cream, Marty (Robert Capron) becomes obsessed with catching the mysterious "Kreemy Kold" ice cream truck that seems to haunt his neighborhood, but always manages to elude him. The local mailman tells Marty the story of a boy named Jimmy Jeffries who was just as obsessed as he was and caught the truck, but vanished and never returned. Marty manages to stop the ice cream truck but in a twist ending, he learns that to get all the Kreemy Kold ice cream he wants involves the payment of his soul when he encounters an older Jimmy Jeffries (C. Ernst Harth). He ends up trapped inside the freezing ice cream truck until someone else becomes as crazed as he was for the ice cream, catches the truck, and takes his place. Guest stars: Laine MacNeil as Marty's sister, and Nicholas Elia as Marty's friend Ari.
| 18 | 18 | "Pool Shark" | Jason Furukawa | Neal Shusterman | April 16, 2011 |
Kai (Booboo Stewart) must overcome his fear of the water in order to convince people there is a shark in the pool. It is suspected that the shark is actually a Nanaue (a creature that is a shark in the water and a human on land). It turns out that the shark Kai was seeing was actually his father and that alongside his dad, he is also a Nanaue. Kai uses this as an advantage by scaring Cameron (Anthony Konechny), the guy that bullies him, and taking his crush Alexa (MacKenzie Porter) for a ride in the pool on his back in the form of the shark.
| 19 | 19 | "Lights Out" | Neil Fearnley | Melody Fox | April 23, 2011 |
Teddy (Gabriel Basso) does not believe in ghosts, and postulates that the various ghost-hunting shows are all fake. He wants to prove that he can fake a ghost hunting experience and make his footage look just as realistic as those he's seen on television, so he, his sister Haley (Madison Desjarlais), and his friend Sean (Jeffrey Ballard) go to a supposedly-haunted asylum with a video camera in order to hoax their own ghostly encounter. It is revealed that any patient who was caught after "Lights Out" would be dangerously operated on by the asylum's evil doctor, Dr. Sturgis (Linden Banks), and that everyone inside the asylum died in a fire many decades earlier. It also turns out that the asylum really is haunted and that the ghosts of the patients are trying to protect the three children by locking them in a room minutes before "Lights Out" begins. Unfortunately, the children misunderstand the attempt, believing that the ghosts were trying to hurt them. They escape from the room and Teddy gets caught by the ghost of Dr. Sturgis who operates on Teddy. Haley and Sean find Teddy rocking back and forth in a room, so traumatized by his ghostly operation that all he can do is mutter "Lights Out" over and over. Although all this has been captured on camera and posted on the Internet, kids who watch the video believe it is fake and decide to investigate for themselves. Guest stars: Sheila D. Baker as Old Ghost Woman.
| 20 | 20 | "The Perfect Brother" | Michael Scott | Erik Patterson & Jessica Scott | April 30, 2011 |
Josh (Landon Liboiron) always knew that Matt (Gregg Sulkin) was the perfect son in the family. But when Matt's star begins to fade, Josh thinks that what his parents propose may be taking things to the extreme. It is revealed in the end that Matt is actually a robot whose warranty has already expired, causing all the bizarre changes. After being replaced, Josh finds out that Matt wasn't the experiment. As Josh is about to be shipped away, his parents tell them that they are robots as well and that he was the experiment, not Matt.
| 21 | 21 | "Scary Mary" (Part 1) | Peter DeLuise | Billy Brown & Dan Angel | May 7, 2011 |
Part 1 of 2. Hanna (Eva Allen) is convinced by her friends into chanting the Scary Mary poem into her mirror before telling her the legend: "There once was a girl named Mary who was obsessed with her looks and loved people making themselves beautiful. She lived in a farmhouse and was a very lonely girl. One day, the farmhouse caught on fire and she burned to death. To this day, she waits for someone to chant her name so she can "take their face" and become beautiful again". Days later, Hanna is convinced that "Scary Mary" has contacted her by leaving a compact hairbrush marked with the letter "M". That night, Hanna applies makeup products while brushing her hair with the "M" brush, not knowing there are masked girls inside her mirror waiting to take her. Seconds later, the girls break through the mirror and pull her in, trapping her in the world of Scary Mary.
| 22 | 22 | "Scary Mary" (Part 2) | Peter DeLuise | Billy Brown & Dan Angel | May 14, 2011 |
Part 2 of 2. While in Scary Mary's world, Hanna refuses to be like everyone else, who have given their faces to Mary, leaving themselves faceless. Mary uses the faces to disguise herself as one of them, hoping that a boy will come to rescue the girl and take Mary out of her world, but nobody ever comes. Hanna's friend Eric (Jean-Luc Bilodeau) comes to save her and finds Mary with her face, but realizes that it's not her. Mary's farmhouse bursts into flames, representing what killed her. Eric finds the real Hanna and gets back to the real world by going in a river of Mary's tears. At the end, Mary comes to call Eric from the mirror.

=== Season 2 (2011–12) ===
| No. overall | No. in season | Title | Directed by | Written by | Original release date |
|---|---|---|---|---|---|
| 23 | 1 | "Creature Feature" (Part 1) | Peter DeLuise | Billy Brown & Dan Angel | October 1, 2011 |
Part 1 of 2. A classic film lover named John (Joel Courtney) gets sucked into a 1950s B-movie called I Was A Teenage Tick Monster playing at a haunted drive-in. He soon ends up in the movie where he is pursued by the Tick Monster and the evil mad scientist Dr. Mangle (Matt Angel). Guest starring: Brendan Meyer as Nathan and Sarah Dugdale as Lisa Note: This is Dugdale's second time in the show since "Wrong Number". This is also Meyer's and Matt Angel's second time on the show since "The Dead Body" and Bancroft's second time in the show since "Walls".
| 24 | 2 | "Creature Feature" (Part 2) | Peter DeLuise | Billy Brown & Dan Angel | October 8, 2011 |
Part 2 of 2. Nathan and Lisa get sucked inside the B-movie to rescue John and stop the evil mad scientist Dr. Mangle from releasing his creation in the real world. In the end, John decides to stay in the movie. Lisa and Nathan decide to leave him and go back to the real world as John wanted it this way. As the Tick Monster appears, John just quotes "fade to black" and the episode ends.
| 25 | 3 | "Swarmin' Norman" | Peter DeLuise | Jack Monaco | October 15, 2011 |
A bullied boy named Norman (Bobby Coleman) discovers that he has god-like power over insects and uses them to get revenge on his tormentors only to discover the hard way that absolute power corrupts absolutely. Norman squashed an insect as a form of intimidation and now all of the insects are rebelling against Norman. He tries to keep the insects out of his room, but forgets one hole in the wall that the insects take advantage of. They all swarm into his room and completely cover his body. The episode ends with a quote about how insects outnumber humans by a factor of billions, courtesy of Norman's science teacher Mr. Dunwood (Vincent Gale). This ending suggests that the insects have started an uprising against all humans. Guest starring: Joshua Ballard as Tyler Note: This is Coleman's second time in the show since "Walls".
| 26 | 4 | "Flight" | Peter DeLuise | Jack Monaco | October 22, 2011 |
A boy named Josh (Dakota Goyo) is on his first flight. He learns that the Grim Reaper in the form of an old woman is a fellow passenger and the ghost of a millionaire named Vincent (Tobias Slezak) is trying to escape her. When the airplane starts to lose power, Josh convinces Vincent to move on. Vincent does, and the airplane's power is restored.
| 27 | 5 | "Pumpkinhead" | Neill Fearnley | Erik Patterson & Jessica Scott | October 29, 2011 |
A girl named Allie (Kacey Rohl) and her brothers Dave (Frankie Jonas) and Scott (Liam James) investigate a pumpkin patch said to be tended to by a murderous farmer named Farmer Palmer (Eric Keenleyside) who kidnaps children and switches their heads with the pumpkins in his gardens which turns them into Pumpkinheads. Eventually, Allie and Scott become Pumpkinheads upon their capture as the Pumpkinhead Allie heads out to capture Dave.
| 28 | 6 | "Brush with Madness" | Neill Fearnley | Erik Patterson & Jessica Scott | November 5, 2011 |
When comic book geek Corey (Dylan Minnette) gets yelled at by his favorite artist Allan Miller (Mackenzie Gray) during a comic book convention upon asking too many questions, Corey steals Allan's brushes and comes up with his own creation, only to learn that Allan's brushes have the power to turn fantasy into reality when he and his friend Emma (Chanelle Peloso) are pursued by a villain called the Mad Artist (also played by Dylan Minnette). In a twist ending, it is determined that Allan was the one behind the whole thing trying to create his new comic book. He then shreds it so that he won't get a lot of questions about it from his fans which he states to his bodyguard. NOTE: Allan Miller's name is a combined spoof of Alan Moore and Frank Miller.
| 29 | 7 | "Sick" | Terry Ingram | Jack Monaco | November 12, 2011 |
A boy named Alex Howard (Garrett Ryan) is staying home from school because he is sick with a bad fever. While his mother (Julia Benson) is out getting him some medicine, he finds out there is a monster in the house and he is being quarantined. With help from the TV newsman (Peter Benson), he fights the monster. Alex then wakes up to find his mother. She then tells him it was all a fever dream. But in a twist ending, Alex then hears the TV newsman saying that they (the newsman, the monster, and the quarantine) are not the fever dream and that his mom, the painters (the people doing the quarantine in his "dream"), and vacuum cleaner (the monster in his "dream") are the fever dream and that they can't help if he won't listen. The episode ends with everything engulfed in a blinding white light with Alex still not knowing which is which.
| 30 | 8 | "Mascot" | Jason Furukawa | Craig S. Phillips & Harold Hayes, Jr. | November 19, 2011 |
Willie (Riley Griffiths) and Drake (Nick Purcha), two students at Yellow Valley High School, hate the school mascot Big Yellow (Dan Payne), an odd, yellow, mute, monstrous creature that performs at basketball games. They decide to elect a new mascot, and must inform the current student in the Big Yellow costume that he is no longer needed--but no one seems to know who that student is. Regardless, Willie and Drake hold auditions for their new mascot, and a break-dancing teen in a wolf costume gets the job--over the protests of Big Yellow, who arrives and tries to audition himself. That night, the student in the wolf mascot costume is attacked by Big Yellow, and the following morning, Willie finds the wolf costume's head, torn to bits, in his bed. Determined to find out Big Yellow's true identity, Willie investigates the mascot's dressing room after the school closes, only for Big Yellow to begin trying to attack him. After escaping, Willie confronts Big Yellow alone in the gym, ripping off the mascot's head--but both the head and body begin to move independently, revealing that Big Yellow is not a costume, but an actual creature. The next morning, Drake discovers messages from Willie on his cell phone, and goes to the school to investigate, only to find his friend, along with Big Yellow, missing. At that night's basketball game, though, Big Yellow reappears, and Drake calls Willie on his cell phone...and hears Willie's phone ringing in reply from inside of the mascot's stomach. As the episode ends, Big Yellow looms over Drake and smiles while both Willie and the wolf mascot are shown trapped inside of the creature, slowly being digested and screaming for help.
| 31 | 9 | "Bad Feng Shui" | James Head | Melody Fox | November 26, 2011 |
Jessica Cheng (Brianne Tju), a Chinese-American girl, has a strained relationship with her strict mother (Benita Ha) who constantly pushes her to excel in her studies, practice her violin, and keep her room neat. When Jessica misses a shopping trip to Chinatown with her mother, Mrs. Cheng stumbles upon Mr. Ming's (Colin Foo) shop, who promises to bring good feng shui to the Chengs with his items, including a cabinet emblazoned with a snake. Mrs. Cheng buys a large selection of objects and arranges them in Jessica's room without telling her. Jessica is furious and destroys the curios. Later that night, a snake slithers out of the cabinet and takes the form of a serpentine demon who rearranges Jessica's room. The next morning, an angry Mrs. Cheng threatens to stop Jessica from participating in activities such as an upcoming dance, prompting her daughter to shout a wish that she weren't her mother. In that instant, the snake demon appears and kidnaps Mrs. Cheng; later, the creature assumes her form and tries to attack Jessica and her friend Megan (Victoria Duffield). The girls travel to Mr. Ming's shop, and while he is able to offer some advice, he cannot defeat the demon, as it is "Jessica's ghost". He gives the pair replacements for the curios Jessica destroyed, and the girls return home, where Jessica restores her room to its former state. But this is not enough to defeat the demon, who appears and begins to destroy other items in the house. Jessica realizes that her cruel wish gave the creature its power, and tearfully cries that she did not mean what she said, insisting that she needs her mother. Mrs. Cheng, trapped in a darkened space, hears her daughter's cries and reaches out to her, forming a temporary connection that causes Jessica to notice her violin. Remembering that her mother loves her violin playing, Jessica takes up the instrument and performs Bach's Minuet in G major, also known as "A Lover's Concerto", which banishes the demon back to its cabinet and frees Mrs. Cheng. The two embrace, promising that they love each other.
| 32 | 10 | "The Hole" | Peter DeLuise | Erik Patterson & Jessica Scott | December 3, 2011 |
Rob (Braeden Lemasters) and Carrie (Ava Hughes)'s family move to a new house when strange things start to happen. They play catch in the back yard and find a big hole with a picture of a family in front of a car and lose their ball. Rob decides to investigate and video tape the hole during the night. When Rob and Carrie watch the video they see a man with his family telling them that they eat together and later throws a grill at the camera. They use the car's license plate in the photo and find out the man's family died in a car wreck. They show their mom (Allison Hossack), but she doesn't believe them. All of a sudden, a picture breaks with their father (Robert Wisden)'s face scratched out. The ghost takes their mom and tries to drag her into the hole. Rob and Carrie save her but their dad gets sucked in instead. He later emerges and they all have lunch together. Their dad wears the same shirt as the man in the video. The kids try to leave but the man says they eat as a family, symbolizing that the ghost possessed their father.
| 33 | 11 | "Scarecrow" | Ken Friss | Billy Brown & Dan Angel | December 10, 2011 |
A young farmer named Jenny (Bailee Madison) has trouble ridding her crops of crows, so she buys a scarecrow from a mysterious salesman (Juan Riedinger). Jenny soon discovers that the scarecrow is behind a chain of mysterious disappearances.: Ending #1: The one during the premiere depicts Jenny's brother Bobby (Richard Harmon) setting fire to the scarecrow during the salesman's narration about the end of the world and walking away.; Ending #2: Most reruns have a different ending where Bobby is turned into a scarecrow by the salesman and made to watch the world end.
| 34 | 12 | "Dreamcatcher" | Neill Fearnley | Katherine Boutry | December 17, 2011 |
Lisa (Kerris Dorsey) is beginning her first day at Camp Pine Mountain and is very nervous. She befriends a girl named Amelia (Michelle Creber) and makes an enemy in Meg (Madeleine Arthur). The camp legend of a mysterious creature called the Dream Catcher who feeds on nightmares appears to be true after a cabin full of girls have a recurring nightmare that scares them into insomnia. The Dream Catcher then targets Lisa, Amelia, and Meg. Before the Dream Catcher can attack Lisa, her alarm goes off saving her and Amelia. Meg is shown still asleep in the mess hall as the Dream Catcher prepares to attack her.
| 35 | 13 | "The Most Evil Sorcerer" (Part 1) | Peter DeLuise | Melody Fox | January 7, 2012 |
Part 1 of 2. In a medieval English town ruled by a corrupt sorcerer named Margolin (Michael Ironside), two teens named Ned (Connor Price) and Sara (Jodelle Ferland) set out to dethrone the sorcerer and rid him of his magic where they receive help from Margolin's apprentice Gresilda (Gina Holden). Guest starring: Gina Holden and Karin Konoval as Gresilda
| 36 | 14 | "The Most Evil Sorcerer" (Part 2) | Peter DeLuise | Melody Fox | January 7, 2012 |
Part 2 of 2. When Ned and Sara discover that the sorceress Gresilda (who helped them dethrone the evil sorcerer) was the one who taught him black magic, Ned takes revenge against Gresilda and Sara worries that Ned's obsession to learn magic may drive them apart. Eventually, Gresilda was tricked by Ned into smelling sleeping potion then Ned remembered the spell Gresilda was performing (when his eyes were taken away and were being put in a jar right next to her) and had put Gresilda into a deep sleep. Sara revealed to Ned that a kiss can break the spell. Hundreds of years (give or take a century or two) later, Gresilda was still under the sleeping spell until a hiker came up thinking something was wrong with Gresilda and started to give her CPR. Gresilda snapped awake and grabbed the hiker.
| 37 | 15 | "Stage Fright" | Peter DeLuise | Erik Patterson & Jessica Scott | January 14, 2012 |
A high school drama club is doing a play based on the story of Hansel and Gretel, but bad things have been happening: the original lead actress breaks her leg and is demoted to a tree and the witch actress keeps forgetting her cues. One of the stage hands reveals that the play is cursed and other schools have had trouble with it where one boy was even beheaded on stage. The other stage hand is attacked, vanishes and during the play the mother and father actors are attacked and all three are found bound and gagged backstage. The first stage hand believes that the drama teacher is the real witch that cursed the play, and gets Hansel and Gretel to throw her into the fake oven. But the witch isn't her, it's the actual witch (Ellie Harvie) from the story. She reveals that she cursed the play because she was mad that her story wasn't being told properly. As she locks the stage doors and turns off the lights, she says she didn't eat Hansel and Gretel, she ate their parents. Guest starring: Jianna Ballard as Jen and Rowen Kahn as Sam
| 38 | 16 | "Night of the Mummy" | Neill Fearnley | Katherine Boutry | January 21, 2012 |
When a rare Egyptian exhibit comes to town, Seth (Zachary Gordon) takes a job as a museum volunteer. However, the more Seth becomes drawn to the exhibit, the more he finds out that he may be connected to the Mummy of the Boy Pharaoh (in more ways than one). Seth enlists his friend Phoebe (Margeaux Muir) for help. It turns out that Seth is the long-lost twin brother of Seti (also played by Zachary Gordon) and decides to be with his brother in the afterlife as the curator (Andrew Kavadas) summons a sandstorm. When Phoebe wakes up, she finds that Seth is now a mummy and joining his brother in the afterlife.
| 39 | 17 | "Headshot" | Michael Scott | John Esposito | January 28, 2012 |
In this homage to The Picture of Dorian Gray, Gracie (Ariel Winter) is working at an ice cream shop when Cassandra Hobbs (Crystal Lowe), a scout for the magazine Teen Teen (and heavily implied to be the Devil) offers her a photo shoot, turning down money, saying 'Its all about the desire.' After the shoot, Gracie's demeanor changes from sweet to diva and her picture on her phone begins to change into ugly. As Cassandra suggests, she cheats on her midterm and her friend Dylan (Nicholas Elia) is suspended instead. Flynn (Tiera Skovbye) is also getting a free shoot, so a jealous Gracie doses her smoothie with Red Dye #5, which makes Flynn break out in hives. Lexi (Julia Sarah Stone) is disgusted by her friend's actions and leaves the debut to see the models on the wall change from pretty to monstrous. Lexi also finds out that Cassandra is The Devil who steals the souls of any teen girl who wants to be known as the prettiest face in the world, even though Cassandra claims that she only offers encouragement and that Gracie and all the girls on her wall are actually shallow and cutthroat because they refused to turn down the offer by deleting the headshot. As Gracie is chosen as the new face of Teen Teen magazine, Lexi deletes Gracie's ugly headshot from her phone in an attempt to bring Gracie back to normal. In an end narration, Lexi reveals that Cassandra was right: Gracie and only Gracie had the power all along to walk away from being famous and because she didn't, her beautiful face now hangs on Cassandra's wall while her new and permanent one is uglier than the one on her cell phone. Note: This is Ariel Winter's second time in the show since "Fear Never Knocks" and Elia's second time on the show since "Catching Cold".
| 40 | 18 | "The Return of Lilly D." | Neill Fearnley | Billy Brown & Dan Angel | February 4, 2012 |
The evil doll Lilly D. from "Really You" is back and out to get revenge on the family who discarded her. The doll is found by two boys who give it to Natalie (Mackenzie Foy), a sweet girl who cleans her up and then her grandfather (Terence Kelly) takes the doll to the "Really You" hospital, to repair her arm and the Doll maker (Gabrielle Rose) realizes that the doll has turned nice as she later brings the doll back to Natalie. The next day, Natalie finds a lonely baby bird and puts it in a shoe box, which makes the doll jealous and later in the night, the doll attempts to get it by using a stool, but falls and Natalie doesn't know what happened. The dolls in the basement tell the Doll maker that Lilly D. is still bad so she goes to try to save Natalie, but the doll drops a fish bowl on her head. Natalie starts to think about Lilly D. and wants to get rid of her, but she hides. Later that night, Lilly D. tries to drown the baby bird in the bathtub and later kicks Gramps down the stairs. Natalie sees Lilly D. in a wheelchair, but she turns out to be a lamp but the doll is behind her and has a knife. Natalie hits it out of her hand, then on the head with a frying pan and then her head lands in a pot of water (while the dolls sing a lullaby) and then Natalie puts the pan on top of her head, meaning the doll is dead.

=== Season 3 (2012–13) ===
| No. overall | No. in season | Title | Directed by | Written by | Original release date | US viewers (millions) |
|---|---|---|---|---|---|---|
| 41 | 1 | "Grampires" (Part 1) | Neill Fearnley | Erik Patterson & Jessica Scott | October 13, 2012 | N/A |
Part 1 of 2. Mike (Mitchell Kummen) and Cristen (Chanelle Peloso) visit Grandpa Montgomery (Christopher Lloyd) at his retirement community where everyone (including the grandfather) is a vampire. Note: This is Peloso's second time in the show since "Brush with Madness".
| 42 | 2 | "Grampires" (Part 2) | Neill Fearnley | Erik Patterson & Jessica Scott | October 13, 2012 | N/A |
Part 2 of 2. After revealing to his grandson that he is a vampire (but only preys on rats and doesn't go after humans), Montgomery and Mike try to stop the other vampires (who do prey on humans – especially young children) from winning Cristen in a bingo game. When the vampires are fended off, Walt and his grandchildren clean up the bingo hall for the bingo hall's owner since tonight is a full moon and werewolves hate being in a messy bingo hall.
| 43 | 3 | "The Cast" | Ken Friss | Craig S. Phillips & Harold Hayes Jr. | October 20, 2012 | N/A |
Lex Johnson (Robert Capron) is out with two punk brothers named Dexter (Cainan Wiebe) and Sterling Scott (Jonathan Hers), who he's trying to impress, and joins them in throwing eggs at the crazy cat lady Ms. Hibou (Christina Jastrzembska)'s house. When Ms. Hibou comes out to scold the boys and they start to run, Lex trips upon being startled by one of Ms. Hibou's cats and breaks his arm. He tells the police that the Scott Brothers threw the eggs, that he was trying to stop them and is praised as a hero. After a visit to the doctor (Marilyn Norry), his cast starts to itch and move like there's something alive in there. The doctor doesn't see anything when this is brought up to him. Ms. Hibou's cats soon take an interest in Lex's cast. While his mom is out, Ms. Hibou comes to his house and reveals that there are rats in his cast and she has brought her cats to feed on them. In a panic, he uses a hacksaw on his cast. His mother (Darla Fay) comes home in time to prevent him from cutting his arm off and calls 911. In the ambulance, he finally confesses his involvement of the egging of the cat lady's house as he sees the rats in the ambulance. Yet the techs don't see the rats, suggesting it's a delusion. Note: This is Capron's second time on the show since "Catching Cold".
| 44 | 4 | "The Weeping Woman" | Neill Fearnley | Harold Hayes Jr. & Craig S. Phillips | October 27, 2012 | N/A |
A Mexican boy named Chi (Rico Rodriguez) is staying over his friend, Danny Nelson's, house, but Danny's mom (Enid-Raye Adams) has been bitter, depressed, and unhospitable lately because of her husband's constant traveling — and things get worse when her negative feelings bring to life the spirit of a woman known in Hispanic urban legend as "La Llorona". La Llorona (Lani Gelera) comes and takes Hanna (Ali Skovbye) and Chi (Collin MacKechnie) to the pond and tries to drown them. Chi overcomes his fear of water and rescues the kids. Mr. Nelson (Woody Jeffreys) returns making Mrs. Nelson happy and the La Llorona statue is placed in a box outside labeled "Free Stuff", which frightens Chi into quickly getting in the car. Note: This is Jocelyne Loewen's second time in the show since "Creature Feature".
| 45 | 5 | "Intruders" | Ken Friss | Jack Monaco | November 3, 2012 | N/A |
Eve (Willow Shields) has been unhappy ever since the birth of her baby brother. One night she sees lights in the forest behind her house, and meets a fairy who tells her that she's a changeling who possesses fairy powers. After having fun using her new powers, the fairy tells Eve that she can be a fairy forever if she gives the fairy her baby brother. She pretends to, but tricks the fairy by bringing iron (which is lethal to a fairy). After she returns home, menacing eyes peer out of the forest and approach the house.
| 46 | 6 | "Spaceman" | Neill Fearnley | John Esposito | November 10, 2012 (Original Airing); January 19, 2013 (Director's Cut) | N/A |
Aaron (Will Shadley) is a lonely boy who is given a toy space helmet by a neighborhood woman named Mrs. Hollinger (Karin Konoval). The helmet begins receiving calls (despite not having batteries in it) and Aaron thinks it's an alien trying to make contact with him. When Aaron ends up in the attic, Aaron finds out that the voice on the other side is the ghost of the woman's dead son who loves space and space travel and had died of an illness at a young age as Aaron finds the skeleton of Mrs. Hollinger's son. There were two different endings to this episode: Original Ending - When Mrs. Hollinger tells Aaron to leave, Aaron decides to stay and play spaceman with Mrs. Hollinger's son every day.; Director's Cut Ending - Aaron is forced to play with Mrs. Hollinger's dead son after his ghost urges his mom to let him stay in the attic and play spaceman with him forever.; Note: Karin Konoval also appeared in the season 1 episode "Wrong Number" and the season 2 episodes "The Most Evil Sorcerer: Part 1 & 2".
| 47 | 7 | "Red Eye" | Ken Friss | Natalie Lapointe & Greg Yolen | November 17, 2012 | N/A |
Georgia (Mackenzie Foy) enjoys getting mail from her father when he's traveling. But then she receives a picture with a dark shadow on it. The next picture has the shadow right next to father. After suffering bad dreams, she figures out that she is being haunted by an Alp with the power to possess small objects. When her father comes back with a doll as a present, she thinks it is carrying the Alp and smashes it at night. Her father (Kurt Evans) comes out and reveals his red eyes that mark him as the Alp, saying "Daddy's not here" as Georgia screams. Note: This is Foy's second time in the show since "The Return of Lilly D".
| 48 | 8 | "My Imaginary Friend" | James Head | Melody Fox | November 24, 2012 | N/A |
Shawn (Ryan Lee) has just moved to a new area, and his only friends are his brother David (Adam DiMarco) and his imaginary friend Travis (Jeffrey Ballard) who is a bad influence. After concentration, David can see Travis. When David talks Shawn out of smashing a car's windshield as Travis suggested, Travis is angry and tries to scare David by drowning him. When he doesn't back down, Travis drags him to the neighbor's barn and says they can be friends if David will burn down the barn. He refuses, they start fighting and Shawn runs in, banishing Travis, although breaking a post and injuring himself on a falling hook. David congratulates Shawn and says he's old enough to be without imaginary friends. Shawn agrees and banishes David who turns out to be Shawn's "imaginary brother".
| 49 | 9 | "Poof De Fromage" | Ken Friss | Erik Patterson & Jessica Scott | December 1, 2012 | N/A |
Bobby (Quinn Lord) and his family are housing a French exchange student named Jean-Louis (Vincent Martella) for a year, but a chain of strange happenings make Bobby suspect that his French exchange student may be an alien. He tells him that they are a benevolent species and are trying to save the human race from other aliens that are somewhere in the neighborhood incognito. They find out that the aliens are pretending to be cheese puffs. After Dad (Aaron Craven) opens the door, the aliens flood in, breaking a window and swallow up the family. Note: This is Lord's second time in the show since "Fear Never Knocks".
| 50 | 10 | "The Golem" (Part 1) | Neill Fearnley | Jack Monaco | December 8, 2012 | N/A |
Part 1 of 2. Jeremy (Dylan Schmid) and Bonnie (Kacey Rohl) are saddened to learn of the death of their great-grandmother Nadia (Paula Shaw) and travel to her homeland of Russia to spread her ashes. But soon after they arrive, Jeremy learns of a secret evil that Nadia created in the form of a Golem (Dan Payne) and the villagers accuse Bonnie of being her. Note: This is Payne's fourth time in the show.
| 51 | 11 | "The Golem" (Part 2) | Neill Fearnley | Jack Monaco | December 8, 2012 | N/A |
Part 2 of 2. Jeremy must use his great-grandmother's knowledge and ashes to rid the village of the Golem and save his sister from being murdered.
| 52 | 12 | "The Girl in the Painting" | Ken Friss | Jack Monaco | December 15, 2012 | N/A |
Becky (Bailee Madison) is dreaming of her perfect room which her mother (Camille Sullivan) can't afford when she finds a painting put out in the trash. She becomes obsessed with the image and is called by the girl in the painting (Margeaux Muir) to enter her world and is ecstatic with the room and the sleepover invitation. As she decides to stay, the clock strikes six and the girl in the painting pulls a sash, opening the ceiling, saying it opens at feeding time. An unseen creature devours a screaming Becky, the girl's mother (Claudette Mink) enters and the girl in the painting feels bad about it. It is revealed that people are called into the painting to be fed to the monster so the people in the painting won't be eaten. The girl reluctantly sits back down and waits for the next person to enter the painting, reminding herself it's them or them (her and her mother). Note: This is Madison's third appearance. She previously appeared in the premiere two-parter "Really You" and "Scarecrow". This is Margeaux Muir's second appearance since "Night of the Mummy".
| 53 | 13 | "Checking Out" | James Head | Melody Fox | January 19, 2013 | N/A |
Bratty teens Jeremy (Matthew Knight) and Chelsea (Matreya Scarrwener) are on a family vacation, which gets delayed when the family car gets a flat tire, then a mysterious hotel appears out of a fog. At first the parents (Allison Hossack and Barclay Hope) are told there are no vacancies, until the kids come in, and the parents receive an opulent room and an invitation to an adults-only party by fellow guest Mrs. Baker (Teryl Rothery). Jeremy follows them to the party and sees Mrs. Baker bashing a piñata that looks like her son Todd (Grayson Gabriel), who also is spying on the party. Suspicious, Jeremy and Chelsea investigate, and witness Todd being backed into the portrait of 'The Benefactor' by his mother, which opens and sucks Todd in. When they try to escape the hotel, they are caught and their parents are coerced into doing the same until Jeremy reminds his mom "If they were jumping off a bridge, would you do it too?". The parents come to their senses and they all escape as the hotel burns. Note: This is Knight's second time in the show since "Alien Candy" and Hossack's second time in the show since "The Hole".
| 54 | 14 | "Terrible Love" | Ken Friss | Natalie Lapointe & Greg Yolen | February 9, 2013 | N/A |
Maggie (Emma Grabinsky) is hopelessly infatuated with Brendan (Joel Semande), but he doesn't even notice her. When she messed up a chemical experiment, she meets Cupid (David DeLuise) – depicted as a man in a white suit instead of a boy or young man with wings, which he explains to her as old photographs of himself. Maggie commissions him to shoot an arrow at Brendan to make him fall for her, but when Maggie worries that the love potion will wear off, she asks Cupid for another hit, which he warns against, but does at her request which drives Brendan to go into a love-induced insanity. When she tries to break with him, he gets angry and chases her. When she asks Cupid for help, he says "You wanna be alone? You got it.". Cupid then pushes Brendan down the stairs. She tries to call for Cupid, but meets her nerdy classmate Stuart (Nick Purcha) who comforts her saying she'll find love again soon. Maggie turns to see Cupid shoot an arrow into her, causing her to fall in love with Stuart. Note: This is Grabinsky's third appearance since "Ghostly Stare" and "Creature Feature" and Purcha's second appearance since "Mascot".
| 55 | 15 | "Séance" | James Head | Melody Fox and Tim Shell | October 12, 2013 | 0.374 |
As part of a joke, Naomi (Julia Sarah Stone) and Tracey (Laine MacNeil) try to scare Naomi's sister Carla (Joey King) by summoning the ghost of an evil man named Cyrus Clayton (Ian Gregson), a sawmill worker who was fired for drinking on the job and killed his boss before he lost his leg. But the joke's on them when Carla goes missing and the spirit is let loose in the house. After Naomi and Tracey admitted to Carla that this was part of a joke, Carla summons Cyrus to tell him this as Cyrus appears behind Naomi, Tracey, and Dylan (Lachlan Meyer) asking which one he will be getting a leg from. NOTE: This is Stone's second episode after Headshot, and MacNeil's second episode after "Catching Cold"
| 56 | 16 | "Detention" | Neill Fernley | Harold Hayes Jr. and Craig S. Phillips | October 12, 2013 | 0.332 |
A snooty homecoming queen named Kate (Madison Desjarlais), a jock named Halftime (Casey Dubois), and a Goth girl named Audrey (Madeline Carroll) are stuck in detention under the watch of Mr. Kane (David Pearson). As Mr. Kane leaves, a grinning devil's face flashes in the door glass that Audrey sees. A nerdy-looking boy (Nicholas Ekren) comes in and accidentally splashes Kate with his umbrella, making her mad and insults him, which make Audrey angry and demands that Kate apologize, but she refuses. They argue until the lights flicker and static comes through on the speaker that sounds like a scream, and Kate leaves with Halftime to find a place with cell phone reception. The nerdy boy introduces himself as Gabe (who Audrey's never seen at school before). As Kate and Halftime wander the halls, Halftime admits he doesn't know why he's in detention and asks Kate if he knows, and they hear the speaker scream again. They can't find an exit or Mr. Kane's office, although Kate isn't concerned. Halftime leaves after Kate insults him, and the speaker starts with a flashback from homecoming, announcing the Queen. Mr. Kane comes out and insinuates that Kate wasn't the truly elected Queen, which she denies. The hall twists and changes, and Kate is pulled through a door, her name vanishing from the detention list. Halftime meets a janitor (Stephen Dimopoulos) and admitted to him he rigged the Homecoming vote so Kate could be Queen in order to be invited to a party. He admits it was stupid, and the janitor shows him a way back upstairs, saying "some people never get out of this place, even after they leave, but you might make it". Halftime finds himself back in the detention room, where Audrey sees the devil face in the door glass again. Gabe had left the room earlier to check out a ringing fire bell, and they see the book he was reading and all the ones on the bookshelf are blank. When Audrey tries to exit, the door opens out to an empty black void. The voice coming over the intercom, from Homecoming, is identified as Halftime, and he remembers that because Kate bribed him into fixing the Queen spot, and he was on the Homecoming Court parade float with her, announcing. Gabe reappears, revealing he is "whoever I need to be", changing into the janitor and Mr. Kane. When Audrey finds herself with a smoke bomb in her hand, she remembers she threw it at the float as a prank (having once been Kate's best friend), but it accidentally caught under the wheels and caused it to crash, killing them all. The exit now opens to the site of the crash, Kate is out there, and as she admits she was in the wrong, she and Audrey become friends again. They are all suddenly brought back in time to the day of Homecoming, with the Queen vote fix never happening, and 'Gabe' returns to the detention room. NOTE: This is Casey Dubois' third appearance after "Really You" and Madeline Carroll's second appearance since "Nightmare Inn".
| 57 | 17 | "Funhouse" | Michael Robinson | Erik Pattenson and Jessica Scott | October 19, 2013 | 0.180 |
Brother and sister Chad (Dylan Minnette) and Kelly (Debbie Podowski) are facing difficulties: their father has abandoned the family, and their mother (Debbie Podowski), while concerned for her children, is busy with work. Chad pretends that everything is fine, but Kelly senses tension hiding beneath his apparent stoicism. The siblings promise to always be there for one another--but their bond is tested when a mysterious traveling funhouse comes to their neighborhood and sets up in an abandoned junkyard. Chad feels inexplicably drawn to the funhouse, where the lone Carny (James Pizzinato) who runs the facility entices him inside. The end of the attraction features an animatronic family eating dinner and arguing. Chad loses his temper and, at the urging of a voice heard over the room's speakers, destroys the entire set with a giant sledgehammer. Chad loves the rush of destruction and begins to act nasty and short-tempered with his mother and sister at home. Soon, he cannot stop visiting the funhouse and takes more and more joy with every round of destructive anger--and becomes more and more violent and cruel outside the attraction. Eventually, Chad mutates into a twisted version of his former self bringing his violent tendencies home and smashing everything in his kitchen. Kelly follows her monstrous brother to the funhouse where she urges him to face his own rage before it consumes him. Her words move Chad and he smashes his reflection in a mirror freeing him from the grip of his anger. The siblings leave the funhouse where the Carny urges them home. But when they turn around to confront him, both the Carny and the entire set-up have vanished into thin air. NOTE: This is Dylan Minnette's second appearance since "Brush with Madness".
| 58 | 18 | "Worry Dolls" | Neill Fearnley | Nicole Dubuc | October 26, 2013 | 0.338 |
As a souvenir from her traveling parents, Jordanna (Katherine McNamara) receives a box of knitted dolls known as "Worry Dolls" said to magically fix people's worries -- which prove disastrous when their nanny (Gwynyth Walsh) goes missing, Jordanna's heirloom violin breaks, and Jordanna's parents (Kirsten Robek, Cameron Bancroft) quit their jobs and become obsessed with family togetherness. Jordanna eventually learns of the "Worry Dolls"'s effect and ends up burning them. That night as Jordanna gets into bed, all seems calm and well. As the Worry Dolls are slowly revealed to still be alive and begin to approach Jordanna's bed, the episode comes to an end as she awakens and screams.
| 59 | 19 | "Lovecraft's Woods" | Neill Fearnley | Brandon Auman | November 2, 2013 | N/A |
On their way to a party, three teenagers, a gamer named Nicholas (Joshua Ballard), a goth named Erica (Jessica McLeod), and a brainy girl named Margaret (Rowan Rycroft) are lost in a forest known as Lovecraft's Woods. The woods are named for a man named Elijah Lovecraft, and in the 1930s, he and a group of people got lost in the woods, with only his wife making it out, and thought she'd only be gone for three hours, only to be told she was away for three years, while her husband was grabbed by a ghoul. The three hear a scream as they wander, and run, only to come back to the sign where they started, and as they keep trying to find a way out, run into the creature Erica (Lani Gelera). They flee into a shack that suddenly appears, Erica finds a keychain exactly like her own, and Margaret realizes they're trapped in a time loop. Margaret finds a map behind a picture and they try to escape, only to be chased back in by a mutated Erica, and find a journal on the table where there wasn't before, with one entry, confirming that they're in a loop, and that Erica, in a future loop, wrote it, meaning that the creature chasing them is another Erica, infected by the scratch from the tree earlier. Margaret and Nick try to escape, and Erica completes the loop by finding the coat the creature is wearing and writing the journal entry, and visiting the past three from the beginning of the episode. Note: This is Gelera's second episode since "The Weeping Woman".
| 60 | 20 | "Coat Rack Cowboy" | James Head | Jack Monaco | November 9, 2013 | N/A |
Ethan (Frankie Jonas) and his brother Brett (Rowen Kahn) are sent back to the days of the Old West, where an outlaw named John "Mad Dog" McCoy (Juan Riedinger), who was hanged for his crimes on the tree in Ethan's yard, challenges him to a showdown at high noon after learning that his resting place has been cut down and turned into a coat rack. NOTE: This is Jonas' second episode since "Pumpkinhead", Juan Riedinger's second episode since "Scarecrow" (Riedinger played the scarecrow salesman in the former episode), and Rowen Kahn's second episode since "Stage Fright".
| 61 | 21 | "Long Live Rock and Roll (AKA Doom Metal)" | Neil Fearnley | Brandon Auman | November 16, 2013 | N/A |
Holden (Cameron DeFaria) is a teenager with a garage band, and while he is a talented singer, his lead guitar skills are less than great. After a fight with his bandmates Squee (Jessica Squee, Margot Berner) and Tibbs (Franklin Tibblestein, Jared Ager-Foster), he finds a coupon for 50% off any instrument at a music shop run by a former Keith Richards-esque rocker named Sir Maestro (Mackenzie Gray). Maestro offers an electric guitar that was played by "Garcia, Cobain, and Hendrix"; when Holden plays the instrument, he becomes exceptionally talented. Sir Maestro gives Holden the guitar on two conditions: he needs to sign a contract and promise to play "one performance" for the musician. Holden shows off the instrument to his friends, who struggle to keep up with his newfound talent. Maestro appears and offers more flyers to Holden's friends--but later, he manifests in Holden's bedroom and reveals that he is secretly Satan, with the contract the teen signed acting as a Faustian bargain for his immortal soul. The demon also laughs that he is, at that very moment, selling a new bass guitar and drum kit to Squee and Tibbs, and while he races to save them, he is too late to keep them from signing contracts. Holden discovers Maestro, along with zombified, soulless versions of his bandmates, playing in the back of the shop. Holden then makes a challenge to Maestro: the two will face off in a guitar duel, with the teens' souls on the line. Maestro agrees, setting the condition that whoever makes a mistake first is the loser. The devil is far more talented than Holden, and when it seems that he has won, the teenager speaks to his corpse-like friends, reminding them of their bond and the early days of the band. Holden's words move his friends and bring back their spirits, and together, they play a blisteringly fast song. Sir Maestro tries to keep up, but ends up snapping a guitar string; this counts as a mistake, and the demon vanishes. Holden, Squee, and Tibbs are freed, and they play their own music as the episode ends. NOTE: This is Mackenzie Gray's second episode since "Brush with Madness" and Margot Berner's second episode since "Night of the Mummy".
| 62 | 22 | "Dead Bodies (AKA The Dead Body, Part Two)" | Jason Furukawa | Jed Elinoff and Scott Thomas | November 23, 2013 | N/A |
In the sequel to "The Dead Body", a now-human Jake Skinner (Matt Angel) tries to claim another mortal life after the Wraith (Dan Payne) causes his mortal body to rot for his trickery. Meanwhile, the ghost of Will (Brendan Meyer) returns to claim his old life and save Anna (Tiera Skovbye) from Jake. Eventually, Will and Anna defeat Jake who is dragged to the Underworld by the Wraith. Upon being restored to life by an angel, Will leaves the woods with Anna. The final scene shows Jake's hand rising from the ground to grab his comb. Note: This is Matt Angel's fourth episode ("The Dead Body", and "Creature Feature") and Payne's fourth episode ("Mascot" and "The Golem").
| 63 | 23 | "My Robot" | James Head | Melody Fox | November 30, 2013 | N/A |
Philip (Evan Bird) is a science nerd with a secret: he has a robot (Gabriella Kriss) that he ordered online and programmed himself, and it originally did anything Philip asked, but the robot gradually overpowers Philip's programming and is now doing what is best for Philip, forcing him to do things like exercise and eat tasteless nutrient food. Philip couldn't return the robot to the store and the robot has actually scared his parents away, so he begs for his friend Tim (Chandler Canterbury)'s help in destroying it. They trick the two school bullies, Boyd (Fraser Kirkland, Matteo Stefan) and Joey into helping, and while they do shut down the robot, it resets and now views Tim as his master, which was Philip's plan all along. He leaves to go get his parents to come back and Tim is now stuck with the robot.
| 64 | 24 | "Bad Egg" | Neill Fearnley | Erik Patterson and Jessica Scott | December 7, 2013 | 0.110 |
An irresponsible boy named Jason Berkley (Aedin Mincks) is only one screw-up away from being shipped off to military school as per his strict father (Johnny Cuthbert), which is why Jason needs to pass his egg-sitting assignment. Trouble is, the eggs donated to the school are rejects from a biochemistry lab harboring an ostrichlike monster that is not fit to live among humans. Now Jason must keep his father from knowing about his latest mistake while keeping the monster away from two government agents posing as pest control workers who want the monster back.
| 65 | 25 | "Toy Train (AKA Toy Train Story)" | James Head | Craig S. Phillips and Harold Hayes Jr. | December 14, 2013 | 0.291 |
Logan (Jackson Pace) and his father Hank (Aaron Pearl) have come to pack up his grandfather's house. Logan is excited and wants to go through all the stuff, especially since this was also his father's house, but Logan's father has no time for that, he just wants to pack up and go, not even taking the time to play catch with his son. Logan discovers a toy train set in the barn, and that night hears a train pass by the house, although trains haven't run there for twenty years, since an accident that claimed the life of a switchman. The next day, Logan goes to the tracks and meets a boy named Henry (Liam Dickinson), who shows him how to flatten a penny on the tracks by letting a train run over it. But as he's leaving he's followed by a man in black (Gardiner Millar), who he sees by some old newspapers in the attic is the switchman who died. He shows his father, using the switchman figure from the train set to demonstrate, which freaks his father out. Logan goes back down to the tracks to meet Henry again, this time to flatten a penny himself, when his foot gets trapped in the tracks as the train is coming. As Logan's father goes to look at the train set, the switchman's ghost confronts him. He wants Logan's father to forgive himself, as the switchman died saving him, and in his guilt, he buried the switchman figure. Logan's father replaces the figure, and the switchman saves Logan by switching the train track, and Logan's father races to meet him, hugging him in relief. It's revealed that Henry is the younger version of Logan's father and Logan relived the fatal accident until the switchman saved him.
| 66 | 26 | "Uncle Howee" | Ken Friss | Rick Drew | December 21, 2013 | 0.160 |
Jared (Liam James), a mean-spirited teenager, has to babysit his little sister Cynthia (Jena Skodjie) while their mother (Michelle Brezinski) works the night shift at the hospital. Cynthia happily watches her favorite TV program, "The Uncle Howee Show", hosted by the loud, energetic titular character (Tom Kenny), while Jared speaks to a friend on the phone wanting to go to a movie with friends that night. Upon hearing that all of his friends are going to see a movie, Jared decides to steal the money his mother left for dinner and put Cynthia to bed early so he can sneak out. But he fails to reckon with Uncle Howee, who, along with his rabbit puppet Loomis (voiced by Tom Kenny, performed by Jeny Cassady), is able to communicate directly with Cynthia. When Jared puts Cynthia in bed early so he can sneak out, Uncle Howee, Loomis, and their friend Mr. Clock (Axel Green) suddenly appear in the house, teasing him and using their abilities to prevent him from contacting the police. Uncle Howee makes Cynthia disappear and challenges Jared to a game of "Find Your Sister Before Mom Gets Home and Grounds You for the Rest of Your Life", which Jared loses. Fed up with Uncle Howee's antics, Jared screams at him, only to realize that he is an extremely dangerous force when he discovers that Loomis does not have a puppeteer controlling him. Jared then admits defeat and agrees to become Uncle Howee's friend. The scene then cuts to Cynthia and Jared's mother arriving home from work and discovering Cynthia still watching "Uncle Howee" on TV. Her mother asks where Jared is while she looks for the remote, and discovers the horrible truth when Jared appears on the show, now transformed into a life-sized marionette of himself. She watches in horror as Cynthia waves to her former big brother, giggling.

=== Season 4 (2014) ===
| No. overall | No. in season | Title | Directed by | Written by | Original release date |
|---|---|---|---|---|---|
| 67 | 1 | "I'm Not Martin" | Neill Fearnley | Mitch Watson | October 4, 2014 |
Sean Daly (Sean Giambrone) is at a hospital on Halloween to have his tonsils out. His older brother, Derrick (Joshua Balfour), tells him a story about the hospital. In the 1950s, a boy named Martin Charles (Nicholas Croome) was due for a foot amputation, but on the day of his surgery, he swapped medical charts with the other boy in his hospital room (Collin MacKechnie,) and the other boy had his foot removed instead. His ghost is supposedly haunting the hospital, looking for another victim to take a foot from. That night, Sean is visited by a boy missing a foot and told that the hospital is evil. The boy mentions that once a part is taken from you, you can never leave. The boy shoves Sean into an old part of the hospital, and he is transported back to October 1952. He frantically flees from the doctor (Daryl Shuttleworth) and nurse Kilpatrick (Andrea Ware), but is caught and brought to the operating room and is put under anesthesia. He wakes up in his own hospital bed. The whole thing turned out to be a dream, a side effect of the anesthesia of his tonsil operation. He happily leaves the hospital. As he gets into his mom (Leslie Hopps DeSchutter)'s van, his brother asks if he was scared, Sean says no and smilingly adds in the comment "After all, I'm not Martin" only to hear "Not yet.". Sean looks down to see the one-foot boy from the hospital stroking his leg and Sean screams. Note: This is MacKechnie's second episode after "La Llorona".
| 68 | 2 | "Grandpa's Glasses" | James Head | Billy Brown and Craig S. Phillips | October 4, 2014 |
Bo (Mason Cook) and his mom (Samantha Ferris) are at his grandfather Everett (William B. Davis)'s house. He has died, and his mother is trying to get the house ready to be sold. Bo finds a pair of his grandfather's glasses and begins seeing strange things and hearing someone screaming to be let out. He can't get the glasses off now and is being pursued by a humanoid creature (Kristie Palin) threatening him and telling Bo not to let the person out. He finally convinces his mom to follow him upstairs to the room the screaming is coming from. Bo is pulled inside to meet the screamer who happens to be the ghost of his grandfather. He says that he's trapped here and tells him he regrets not being around for his family, showing Bo a picture of his mom as a child, saying he always kept it with him. The creature is revealed to be his mother's anger who has trapped Everett's spirit, repeatedly threatening to 'burn the place down' and wanting to make Everett suffer. Bo convinces his mother to let go of her anger and forgive her father and the creature turns back into the little girl in the picture. Bo is finally able to remove his grandfather's glasses and the little girl in the picture (Addison Gosselin) is seen putting the glasses on her father and hugging him. With his grandfather's spirit at rest, Bo and his mom embrace.
| 69 | 3 | "My Old House" | Neill Fearnly | Natalie Lapointe & Greg Yolen | October 11, 2014 |
Alice (Olivia Steele-Falconer) and her family are forced to move from their Victorian house because they can no longer afford to live there, and Alice is extremely unhappy, spending the day of the move embracing the "face" in her room, made of two light sconces and a heating grate. It seems as though the house itself is unhappy, too, but Alice's parents are more concerned for their daughter than their former living quarters. They do their best to make Alice feel better, but she stubbornly refuses to embrace their new house as a home. On the first night in her new bedroom, Alice hears a voice calling "Come back, Alice"; the next morning, she pretends to go to school, only to sneak back to the house, which reveals itself to be sentient by unlocking the front door, "smiling" with its heating grate, communicating via the lights, and even providing marshmallows and a fire to roast them. Alice tells the house that she loves it, and hides when her parents arrive looking for her. As she eavesdrops, Alice learns just how much her parents love her and realizes that while the memories of the house are beautiful, they are nothing compared to her family. She decides to leave and says goodbye — but the house flies into a rage, slamming its doors and refusing to let Alice leave. As she panics, the light sconces in her room move forward on red ropes, which take the form of a snake and attack Alice as she screams. The episode ends with a new family moving in, with another preteen girl taking Alice's room as her own. As she does, she discovers that there are now two faces in the room- the light sconce and heating grate, and Alice's own face, permanently frozen into a smile, sealed within the wall. The house evilly welcomes its newest occupants, and Kelsey (Kaitlyn Bernard) rushes out screaming.
| 70 | 4 | "Mrs. Worthington" | James Head | Melody Fox | October 18, 2014 |
Nate (Liam Dickinson) is bullied by his older sister Molly and deals with it by drawing pictures of his sister being punished by a woman he calls Mrs. Worthington. One night when the two are left alone and Molly destroys one of his drawing pencils, he wishes Mrs. Worthington was real. In an instant, Mrs. Worthington (Margot Kidder) appears on their doorstep. Nate tries to warn Molly but she continues to act rudely, so Mrs. Worthington begins enacting the punishments Nate drew, like eyeballs in her food and a scorpion on her head. As Molly refuses to apologize, Mrs. Worthington finally uses a knit voodoo doll to tie her up and literally zip her lip. Nate, faced with the actual punishments, tries to get Mrs. Worthington to leave, but she now wants to punish their mother for ignoring the bullying. Nate realizes she's going too far and tries to free Molly, but he is caught and Mrs. Worthington tries to punish him with a doll. But he realizes he can do voodoo on her through his drawings and rips up the original drawing, thus ripping Mrs. Worthington to pieces as well. Nate and Molly reconcile and are finally getting along. What they don't know is that one of Mrs. Worthington's hands wasn't destroyed as it starts to redraw her picture. Note: This is Dickinson's second episode after "Toy Train (AKA Toy Train Story)"
| 71 | 5 | "Return of the Pumpkinheads" | Jon Rosenbaum | Erik Patterson and Jessica Scott | October 25, 2014 |
In this sequel to "Pumpkinhead", Farmer Palmer has died and the family of Karen (Freya Tingley) and Zach (Harrison MacDonald) have moved into his old, run-down house. Miller, a little boy in a skeleton costume (Sean Michael Kyer), tells Karen and Zach the story of Farmer Palmer, the story of the Pumpkinheads that he created. The boy says that the pumpkins felt abandoned upon Palmer's death. Karen and Zach start hearing odd noises, and their father (Steve Bacic) who is trying to tend the pumpkins is attacked by a Pumpkinhead. Zach is surprised by a scarecrow in a closet (that he tackled earlier) but he and Karen think that it's a prank by the boy in the costume from earlier and go out to find him. Their mom (Sarah-Jane Redmond) is attacked by the Pumpkinheads (Taylor Tai, Chandler Watson, Matt Phillips). They don't find the boy, but the suspicious woman who turns out to be Miller's mom (Meghan Black) is also looking for him so she is also attacked. The siblings run back to the house after hearing their own mom's scream but don't find her. When they go to the pumpkin patch, Karen and Zach find both of their parents turned into pumpkins. They hurry them to the car to flee and are about to drive off, but their parents stop them, having become full Pumpkinheads.
| 72 | 6 | "Near Mint Condition" | Ken Friss | Erik Patterson and Jessica Scott | November 1, 2014 |
Ted (Luke Benward) is obsessed with buying collectable toys online, and spends five thousand dollars (which he was supposed to use to buy a car) on a rare Robo-Bear toy from the 80's named Mangler with a mysterious link to accidents and deaths that occurred to the children that received the toys. Mangler comes alive that night, and goes after Ted's younger brother Mark (Dylan Schmid) and friend Jason (Rhys Matthew Bond) for using him to mock Ted. Mark figures out the link via a blue fuzz ball that Jason dropped and urges Ted to get rid of Mangler. Although Ted refuses, he accepts Mark's suggestion of asking why the previous owner sold him. The seller (Glynis Davies)'s brother owned it, but he died from an animal attack. Ted refuses to destroy the toy and Mangler comes alive again that night going after Mark and seeing him in action finally convinces Ted that he's a problem. They chase it through the house and Ted cuts his head off with a katana, sealing him in a shipping box, and selling him online to recoup his losses. Note: Schmid's third episode after "The Golem".
| 73 | 7 | "Argh V" | Allan Harmon | Jack Monaco | November 8, 2014 |
A studious teenage girl named Sam Covington (China Anne McClain) is preparing for a trigonometry test when her parents pull up to their house in a massive RV that they have just purchased. Her free-spirited mother (Karen Holness) and father Andre (Reese Alexander) talk about living their lives on the road, but Sam is less than supportive of their dream. Her skepticism turns to fear though when she notices strange things about the RV--she has a vision of a man panicking in the driver's seat, hears children's voices giggling and inviting her to "take a trip" and is even pinned under the RV when it moves on its own accord. Sam's fears are confirmed when she and her friend Tully (Samuel Patrick Chu) discover a map belonging to the Applebaums, a family of four who previously owned the RV and died in the vehicle 15 years prior during a trip in the Southwest. Determined to protect her parents, Sam steals the RV, takes it to a junkyard, and even removes some of its wiring only to discover it is waiting for her when she arrives home. The next day, Sam's parents decide to leave on an adventure, despite her protests, and Sam reluctantly joins them. As they drive, they inadvertently end up on the same road that the Applebaums took on their fateful journey. When Sam's father stops looking at the road to consult their map, the sounds and lights of an incoming truck fill the RV. Despite the shock, Sam and her parents are OK and move forward where they see a family of four waving them down for a ride. The family introduces themselves as the Applebaums consisting of Scott (Michael Teigen), Lacy (Jordana Largy), Jenny (Jena Skodjie), and Myron (Spencer Drever), which rattles Sam, but her mother insists that it is merely a coincidence. The Applebaums climb aboard and all seems fine...until Sam sees their children as pale-skinned zombies asking her to "take a trip". She looks around and sees Mr. and Mrs. Applebaum as zombies as well while her parents (speaking in a slow, deathly monotone voice and similarly zombie-like) talk about their excitement for the journey ahead. Sam realizes that she and her family were killed in the truck accident earlier and are now doomed to wander the highway in the haunted vehicle forever. She begins to cry as the RV drives off into the fog.
| 74 | 8 | "Lotsa Luck" | James Head | Nicole Dubuc | November 15, 2014 |
After an extremely bad day at school, Greg (Nolan Gould) comes home complaining about his awful luck. His father (John Emmet Tracy) jokes that he should try to find a leprechaun to help him, but Greg's mother, Kathleen Laura Jaye, an Irish woman, sternly tells her husband to stop. Greg later finds an old book of Celtic folklore in a box of his mother's things. Upon reading it, he learns of a way to capture a leprechaun and gain three wishes. He baits a trap with a golden trophy and imprisons Seamus (Brendan Fletcher), a leprechaun who promises to give him whatever he wants. Seamus warns him, though, that "magic is all about balance", meaning that wishes come at a price. Greg's first wish is to become lucky. The next day, he wins a new bike in a contest, and his crush Amy (Neela Todd) asks him to a dance, but his father abruptly loses his job. He tries to make up for this by wishing for wealth, prompting Seamus to summon him a pot of gold. Kathleen discovers Greg trying to hide the gold and, surprisingly, asks, "How many wishes have ya made?" She reveals that leprechauns are evil tricksters who always claim the soul of their captor as the cost of the third wish, and further tells her son that her great-grandfather Daniel was the only man who ever managed to avoid this fate, which infuriated the leprechauns and eventually led her family to flee Ireland for protection. When Seamus badly injures Greg's father's hand to balance the second wish, Kathleen and Greg try to protect the house using herbs. Seamus enters anyway, torturing the adults and claiming that he will take Greg's soul along with theirs. Greg then enters the room, announces that he has guessed what his great-great-grandfather's final wish was, and uses it to wish that he had never met Seamus, undoing the effects of the leprechaun's magic. Time is reversed to the day after Greg captured Seamus, and all seems well... until Seamus arrives and explains that Daniel's final wish was actually to keep his soul in exchange for the soul of his next male descendant. Greg realizes that this means his soul is forfeited, and Seamus lunges for him.
| 75 | 9 | "Spores" | Ken Friss | Natalie LaPointe & Greg Yolen | November 22, 2014 |
Melvin (William Ainscough) is dragged to Point Park camping grounds, because his father (Paul McGillion) wants to beat an office rival's time to reach Lookout Point, and Melvin doesn't want to go; he's so afraid, he locks himself in the car until his family coaxes him out. A disturbing forest ranger named Ranger Jackson (Juan Riedinger) approaches them, warning them to camp on the designated spots and leave no trace. The forest ranger also states that several campers have gone missing on the trail. His mother (Erica Carroll) steps off the trail to go to the bathroom and a wind bearing spores hits her. The next morning, his mother is missing and although they see her on the trail, she runs away. Their father goes searching again after they set up camp for the night when the wind starts up again. The next morning, he is uncommunicative, and his face and hands turn green. He then tears up the map and forces the family to go up the trail instead of down to get help. When they make it to Lookout Point, their mom has returned. Now their parents are turning into mushrooms just like the bodies of the other campers at the point. Although Melvin and his siblings Jacquelyn (Michelle Creber) and Jack (Mitchell Duffield) run, his twin brother and sister are hit by the spores and begin the mushroom brainwashing. Melvin manages to make it back to the car, but Ranger Jackson is there and sprays spores at Melvin.
| 76 | 10 | "Goodwill Toward Men" | James Head | Billy Brown & Dan Angel | November 29, 2014 |
The Jordans, an extremely wealthy family, are preparing for a Christmas Eve party at their country club. Lyle Jordan (Tobias Slezak), Mrs. Jordan (Ingrid Torrance), and their son Henry (Jeffrey Ballard) are spoiled, selfish, and elitist while the family's daughter Missy (Joey King) is the only person who shows any kindness to Jake Donaldson (Iain Belcher) and his parents Pete Donaldson (Aaron Pearl) and Mrs. Donaldson (Anne Marie DeLuise), their hired helpers who handle the yardwork. After Missy offers Jake cookies and invites him into the house, Mrs. Jordan gets mad at her, and Lyle fires the Donaldsons. Later that night, Jake returns to the Jordans' home and gives Missy a present, explaining that someone placed it in his hands at the mall and told him to "give it to his sister". The present turns out to be a beautiful angel statue, which Missy keeps on her nightstand after her family ridicules it. Late that night, the statue comes to life (Carly Bentall) and marks Mr. and Mrs. Jordan's and Henry's doors with large strings of fire. When Missy awakens the next morning, the Jordans find themselves in an alternate reality where the Donaldsons own "their" house. After being kicked out by the police (Michael Adamthwaite and an uncredited actor), who were summoned upon being in the neighborhood, the Jordans wander the streets until they come across a group of homeless people living in an abandoned barn. Mr. and Mrs. Jordan and Henry continue to be selfish, while Missy tries to make the best of their situation by paying for food from a food truck owner (Colin Foo) and offering a sandwich to a starving woman (Sharon Van Duk). After the family falls asleep, Missy discovers the angel standing on the roof of the barn and begs her to put things back the way they were. A brilliant light shines, and Missy finds herself back in her bedroom on Christmas morning. But reality has permanently shifted where she is now the daughter of the Donaldson family, while the Jordans work for them. This is a positive, as the Jordans are much kinder and nicer than they previously were, while the Donaldsons are generous with their extensive wealth, and they even gave the Jordans a day off. The episode closes with the angel narrating that she spared the Jordans more torture because everyone, rich or poor, deserves Christmas cheer.
