= R.L. Stine's Pumpkinhead =

2025 film directed by Jem Garrard

- Directed by: Jem Garrard
- Written by: Jem Garrard
- Based on: Nightmare Hour by R. L. Stine
- Produced by: Charles Cooper
- Starring: Bean Reid; Adeline Lo; Matty Finochio; Troy James; Kevin McNulty; Bob Frazer; Seth Isaac Johnson; Kendra Anderson
- Cinematography: Robert Zawistowski
- Edited by: David Trevail
- Music by: Jordan Han Andrew
- Production companies: Front Street Pictures; Haunting Hour Road Productions
- Distributed by: Blue Fox Entertainment; Tubi Originals (United States)
- Release date: October 17, 2025
- Running time: 91 minutes
- Country: Canada
- Language: English

R.L. Stine's Pumpkinhead is a 2025 young adult horror film directed by Jem Garrard and starring Bean Reid, Adeline Lo, Matty Finochio, Troy James, Kevin McNulty, Bob Frazer, Seth Isaac Johnson, and Kendra Anderson.

It is based on a short story from Nightmare Hour, by R. L. Stine.

== Premise ==
Sam, a 13-year-old boy, tries to find out what happened to his missing brother.

== Cast ==
- Bean Reid as Sam
- Adeline Lo as Becka
- Kevin McNulty as Farmer Palmer
- Bob Frazer as Sheriff
- Matty Finochio as Rusty
- Troy James as scarecrow
- Seth Isaac Johnson as Finn
- Kendra Anderson as Cassie

== Production ==
As it was under discussion whether the adaptation would receive a TV-14 or TV-PG rating, the gore was adapted to be depicted through the vegetables.

== Release ==
R.L. Stine's Pumpkinhead was released on Tubi on October 17, 2025, as part of the "Terror on Tubi" lineup, and it spent two weeks in the Top 10 on Luminate.

== Reception ==
On The Guardian, Phil Hoad rated it 2/5 stars, and wrote that "this derivative but tautly plotted tale over-relies on Scooby-Doo-style sleuthery, and its truly unsettling turn comes too late". On Common Sense Media, Fernanda Camargo rated it 3/5 stars and considered the film to be a good starting point for young teens who are interested in the horror genre. She compared its thrills similar to the first season of Stranger Things.

On Bloody Disgusting, Joe Lipsett rated it 3/5 "skulls", and noted that the fans of the The Haunted Hour and Goosebumps would enjoy this film.

== Sequel ==
A sequel titled R.L. Stine's Pumpkinhead 2 was released on Tubi on October 9, 2026, featuring Cassandra Peterson, and is inspired by the series The Haunting Hour.

== See also ==
- List of films about curses
- List of Canadian films of 2025
- List of horror films of the 2020s
