= Pauli Hanhiniemi =

Finnish singer and musician

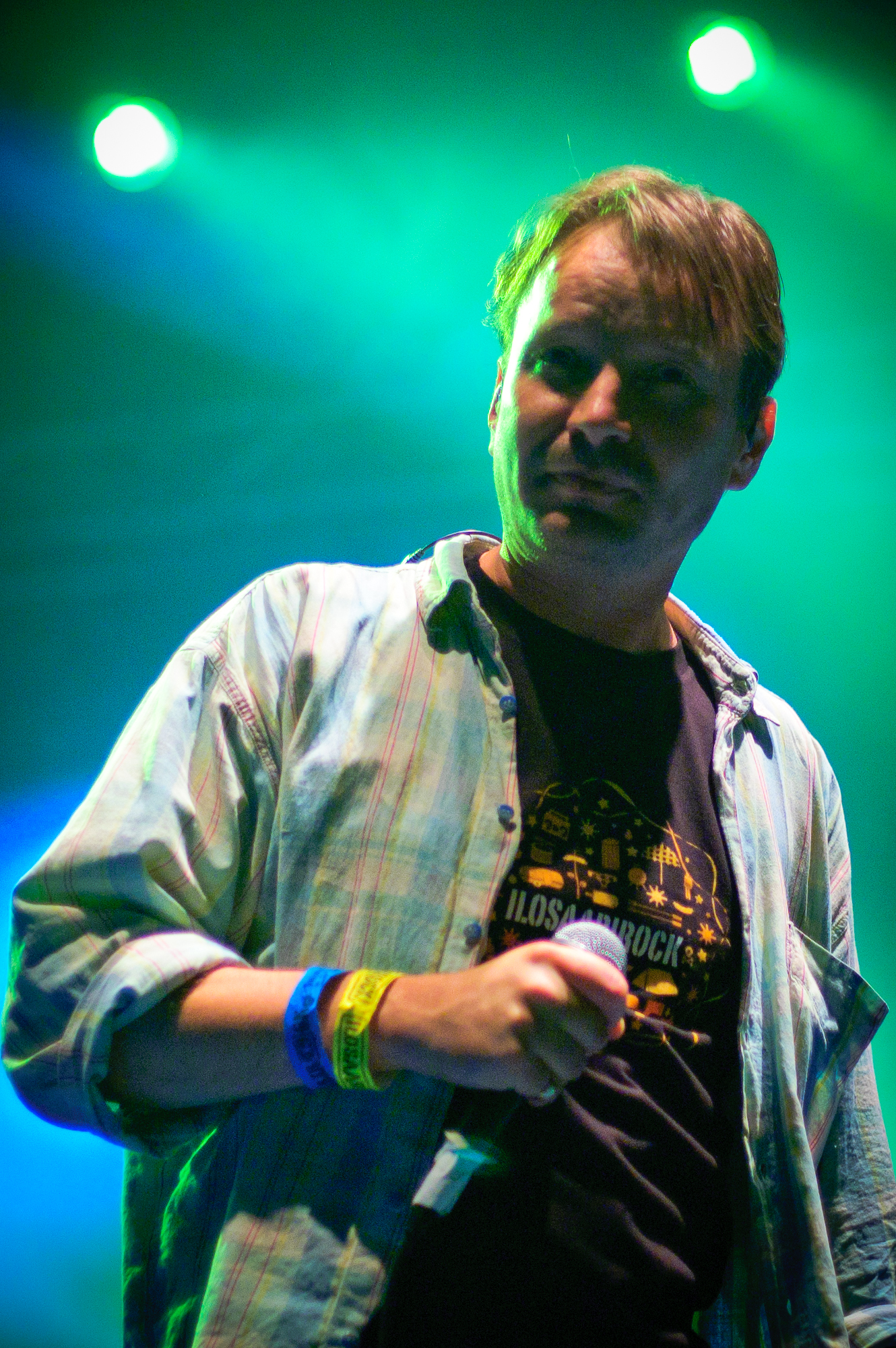
- Pauli Hanhiniemi (2010)

Background information
- Born: 1964 (age 61–62); Alavus, Finland
- Genres: Rock, traditional Finnish music
- Occupations: Singer, songwriter, record producer, musician
- Instruments: Vocals, harmonica, guitar, keyboard
- Years active: 1982 – present

Pauli Hanhiniemi (born 1964) is a Finnish singer, songwriter (composer and lyricist) and musician, who was born in Alavus. Starting his career in 1982, he formed the famous Finnish rock band Kolmas Nainen in 1982. After the break-up of the band in 1994, he formed Pauli Hanhiniemen Perunateatteri that performed until 2005. He later joined Hehkumo, a band with more traditional sound. In 2009, the highly popular Kolmas Nainen returned with two new studio albums and great commercial success.

Hanhiniemi, a prolific singer, songwriter has been involved in writing songs for his own bands, Kolmas Nainen, Pauli Hanhiniemen Perunateatteri, Hehkumo, as well as many other Finnish musical acts such as Edu Kettunen, Juliet Jonesin Sydän, Kerkko Koskinen, Anna Eriksson, Hauli Bros amongst others. For a comprehensive list, refer to fi:Luettelo Pauli Hanhiniemen kappaleista

Hanhiniemi has also appeared as an actor in television and film productions, such as in the 2014 Finnish fantasy film Anselmi: The Young Werewolf.

== Bands and formations ==
=== Kolmas Nainen ===
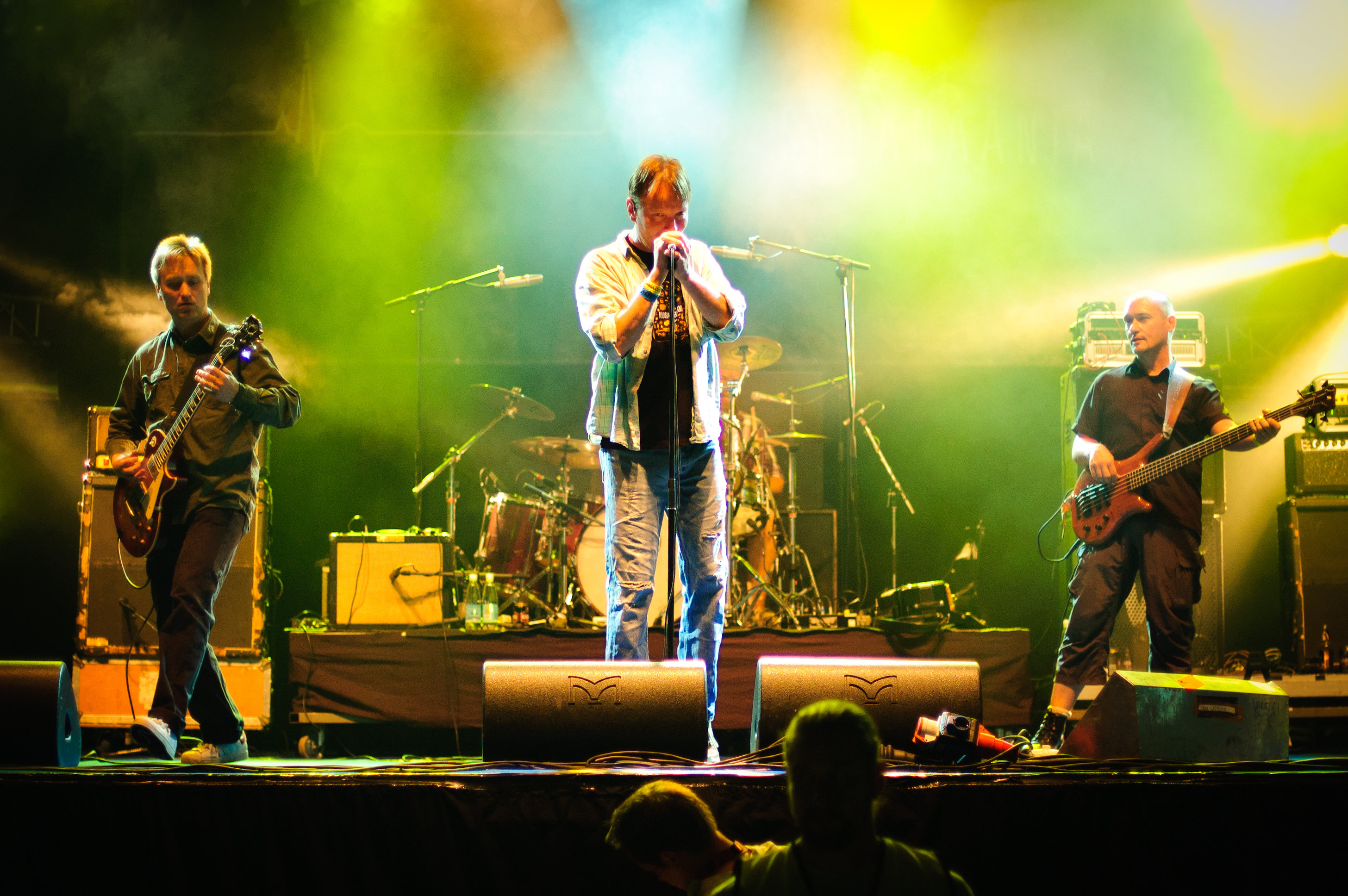
Pauli Hanhiniemi and Kolmas Nainen in a comeback concert in 2010

Kolmas Nainen (literally The Third Woman in Finnish) is a successful Finnish rock band established in 1982 in Alavus. The band was fronted by Pauli Hanhiniemi and came to fame after taking part in the 1984 Rockin SM-kisoissa, a rock music competition. The band survived for a decade releasing 7 studio albums in addition to a number of live albums, DVDs and compilations. The band is enjoying a comeback since 2009 with a string of new studio and compilation releases. Members included Pauli Hanhiniemi (vocals, keyboards, harmonica, accordion), Pasi Kallioniemi (drums, backing vocals), Raimo Valkama (bass), Sakari Pesola (guitar and backing vocals) and Timo Löyvä (guitar). After guitarist Timo Löyvä left in 1989, he was replaced by Timo Kivikangas.

The band broke up in 1994, but continued performing on brief occasions owing to its popularity. In 2009, it made a big comeback with the release of the album Sydänääniä' that topped the Finnish Albums Chart and the follow-up Me ollaan ne that reached number 2 in the same chart.

=== Pauli Hanhiniemen Perunateatteri ===
Pauli Hanhiniemen Perunateatteri
- Origin: Finland
- Genres: Rock
- Years active: 1994–2005
- Past members: Pauli Hanhiniemi (1994–2005); Pasi Hiidenniemi (1994–2005); Mika Hiironniemi (1994–2004); Samuli Happo (1994–2005); Tommi Laine (1998–2005); Juppo Paavola (2004–2005)
- Website: www.kolmasnainen.net

Immediately after the break-up of the band, Pauli Hanhiniemen formed his band Pauli Hanhiniemen Perunateatteri that continued performing from 1994 until 2005. The band released seven albums and was made up of:

- Pauli Hanhiniemi – vocals, harmonica, guitar, keyboard (1994–2005)
- Pasi Hiidenniemi – guitar, backing vocals (1994–2005)
- Mika Hiironniemi – drums (1994–2004) / replaced by:
  - Juppo Paavola – drums (2004–2005)
- Samuli Happo – bass, backing vocals (1994–2005)
- Tommi Laine – guitar, backing vocals (1998–2005)

=== Pauli Hanhiniemi and Hehkumo ===
Hehkumo
- Origin: Finland
- Genres: Rock, Traditional Finnish music
- Years active: 2006–2008
- Past members: Pauli Hanhiniemi; Anne-Mari Kivimäki; Piia Kleemola; Antti Paalanen; Juppo Paavola; Ville Rauhala; Mika Virkkala

After break-up, main vocalist of the band Pauli Hanhiniemi continued performing solo and with the Finnish band Hehkumo. Materials were mainly traditional Finnish music and instruments but with a modernized twist.

The band was formed of:

- Pauli Hanhiniemi – vocals, guitar, harmonica, accordion
- Anne-Mari Kivimäki – 5-row accordion, tamburin, vocals
- Piia Kleemola – violin, viola, 15-string Kantala, vocals
- Antti Paalanen – accordion
- Juppo Paavola – drums, percussion
- Ville Rauhala – double bass, vocals
- Mika Virkkala – mandolin, octave violin, viola

Pauli Hanhiniemi and Hehkumo released two studio albums: Muistoja tulevaisuudesta in 2006 with singles including "Suvisivakointia / Hurja poika", "Suolammen vettä" and "Tähtiin kirjoitettu". This was followed by the album Aukkoja tarinassa in 2008 with singles "Meitä onni hipaisi" and "Vanhanaikainen". The 2008 album made it to number 14 in the Finnish Albums Chart. the band also released a short film Aukkoja tarinassa in 2008.

== Discography ==
=== Kolmas Nainen ===
(For details of albums and singles, see Kolmas Nainen discography section)

Studio albums

- 1986: Kolmas Nainen
- 1987: Paha minut iski
- 1989: Hikiset siivut
- 1990: Hyvää ja kaunista
- 1991: Elämän tarkoitus
- 1992: Tiheän sisään
- 1994: Onnen oikotiellä

Studio albums (comeback period, 2009-present)

- 2009: Sydänääniä
- 2013: Me ollaan ne

=== Pauli Hanhiniemen Perunateatteri ===
Albums

Year	Album	Peak positions
Year	Album	FIN
1995	Vol. 1	–
1996	Mitä sais olla?	17
1998	Kaupunkitarinoita	11
2000	Pikkutaivas	5
2001	Appelle-moi Bob	5
2002	Parhaat	8
2004	Parhaat	12

Charting Singles

Year	Single	Peak positions
Year	Single	FIN
2000	"Siipeen jos sain"	12

=== Pauli Hanhiniemi and Hehkumo ===
Year	Album	Peak positions
Year	Album	FIN
2006	Muistoja tulevaisuudesta	–
2008	Aukkoja tarinassa	14

=== Pauli Hanhiniemi (solo) ===
Year	Album	Peak positions
Year	Album	FIN
2014	Minä ja hehkumo	3
2016	Pölyä, hiuksia, risuja	11
2023	Minä ja Retkue	11
