= Free Spirit (band) =

Background information
- Origin: Seinäjoki, Finland
- Genres: Hard rock, heavy rock, classic rock, AOR
- Years active: 2005–present
- Label: Carpel Music Oy
- Members: Alho; Vesa Yli-Mäenpää; Marko Haapamäki; Pasi Koivumäki; Timo Alho; Pauli Lähdemäki
- Past members: Markku Keski-Mäenpää; Heikki Korkeakoski; Petri Levelä; Jouni Oksaharju; Sami Palolampi; Sami Hämäläinen

Free Spirit is a hard rock band from Seinäjoki, Finland who write and compose their own songs. In 2009, the band released their debut album which was followed by the second album in 2014. Both albums were recorded and produced in the band's own studio facility. Taken from Friedrich Nietzsche's book The Antichrist, the band's name describes a Free Spirit in chapter 13 as a person who is not bound to religion or politics.

== Members ==
- Sami Alho – lead vocal
- Vesa Yli-Mäenpää – guitar, backing vocals
- Marko Haapamäki – guitar, backing vocals
- Pauli Lähdemäki – bass guitar
- Timo Alho – keyboards
- Pasi Koivumäki – drums

== History ==
Formed in the mid-1990s, the original members of Free Spirit were Sami Alho, Pasi Koivumäki and bass player Sami Hämäliäinen, a day-one band member. The original line-up recorded a three-song EP "Rainmaker" 1998 for the Carpel Music label. After changing three of its six members, the musical direction of the band saw a dramatic change. The current line-up was developed from 2006 until 2008.

After guitarist Vesa Yli-Mäenpää joined, the band started to record their first album. During the recording sessions, Vesa's childhood friend Markku Keski-Mäenpää joined Free Spirit. Timo Alho played the keyboards on all studio recordings and also became a full member of the band. Markku moved to Africa before the release of the debut album. He was replaced by Marko Haapamäki. During spring of 2010 “Pale Sister of Light” received good reviews from international media. In 2011 the album was released for the video games: Rock Band 2 and 3.

Recording of the second album All the Shades of Darkened Light began midsummer 2010 and was finished in summer 2012. The final mix of the album was ready in February 2013. The first single, "Living Tattoo", was released mid October 2013. "Hysteria" was chosen as second single release. This song was also featured on the soundtrack of a Finnish werewolf-themed motion picture Anselmi: The Young Werewolf. Lead singer Sami Alho plays one of the main roles in the movie.

The follow-up album All The Shades Of Darkened Light also received positive feedback from international media. The band played its first shows at music festivals.

== Music ==
The music of Free Spirit includes the essential elements of classic rock and adult-oriented rock, mixed up with progressive and heavy shades, Celtic and folk music blends and a contemporary touch. Strong melodies and harmonies as well as lyrical lead vocals and multilayer choirs are important characteristics of the band's music. In their lyrics the band tells stories about all the shades of human life, like euphoria, heartache or love. All the songs are written in English language.

== Discography ==
Studio albums

- Rainmaker [EP] (1998; Carpel Music Oy)
- Pale Sister Of Light (2009; Carpel Music Oy)
- All The Shades Of Darkened Light (2014; Carpel Music Oy)

Singles

- Heroes Don't Cry (2005; Low Frequency Records)
- Living Tattoo (2013; mp3 only)
- Hysteria (2014; mp3 only)
- Between the lines (2023)
- Don’t save me (2024)
- Julianne (2024)
- Dreamer (2025)

Official videos

- Until The Night (2009)
- Hysteria (2014)
- Fever (2014)
- Carry On (2014)
- Silence (2021)
- Between the lines lyric video (2023)
- Don’t save me lyric video (2024)
- Julianne (2024)
- Dreamer (2025)

Soundtracks

- Hysteria (2014, released within “Anselmi, Nuori Ihmissusi”)
