= Bob Frazer =

Canadian actor

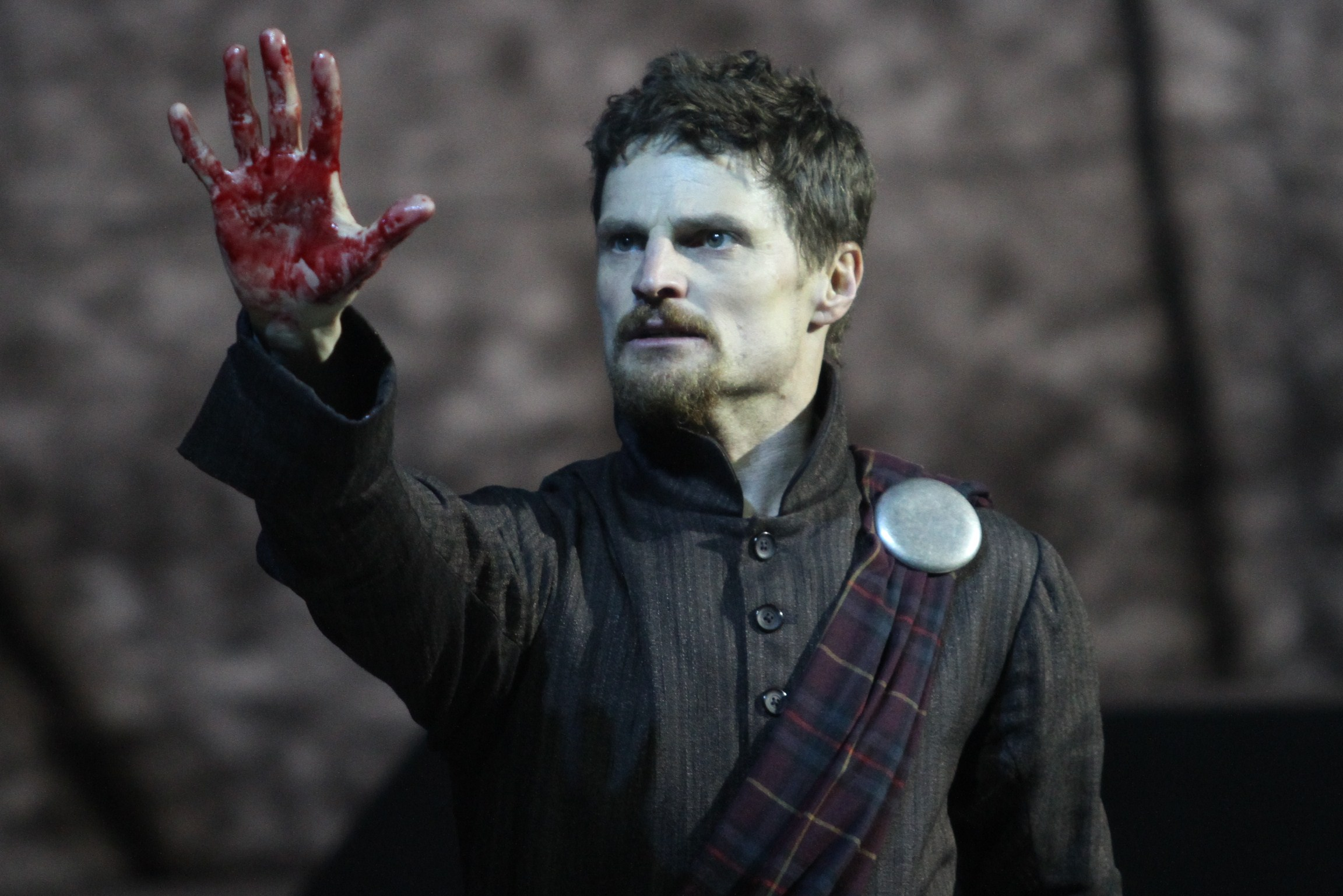
- Frazer as Macbeth in 2012
- Education: Studio 58

Bob Frazer is a Canadian actor of stage and television.

Frazer was born in Ontario. He lives in British Columbia.

== Career ==
Frazer has won multiple Jessie Richardson Theatre Awards, including: "Outstanding Performance by an Actor in a Leading Role" (2005–2006) for his role in Hamlet, "Outstanding Performance by an Actor in a Supporting Role" (2005–2006) for his role in Prodigal Son, and won for "Significant Artistic Achievement" (2003–2004). He has also been a nominee over ten times including "Outstanding Performance by an Actor in a Supporting Role" (2003–2004) for The Glass Menagerie; Iago in Shakespeare's Othello; and as Antipholus of Ephesus in Comedy of Errors during the 2009 season of Bard on the Beach.

== Filmography ==
- The Angel of Pennsylvania Avenue (TV – 1996) as Deputy Sheriff
- Taken (TV Mini-Series – 2005) as Captain Bishop
- Zacharia Farted (1998) as Kevin Wishart
- Bob the Butler (2005) as Coach Jerry
- Girlfriend Experience (2008) as John (voice)
- Interrogation (2016) as Federal Officer
- Finding Mr. Right 2 (2016) as Thomas' Lawyer
- The Cannon (2017) as Colton
- 1922 (2017) as Andrew Lester
- ReBoot: The Guardian Code (2018) Adam Carter
- Drinkwater (2021) as Wesley Ryan
- Fire Country (2022) as Samuel SR
- R.L. Stine's Pumpkinhead (2025) as Sheriff
