= Kolmas Nainen =

Finnish rock band

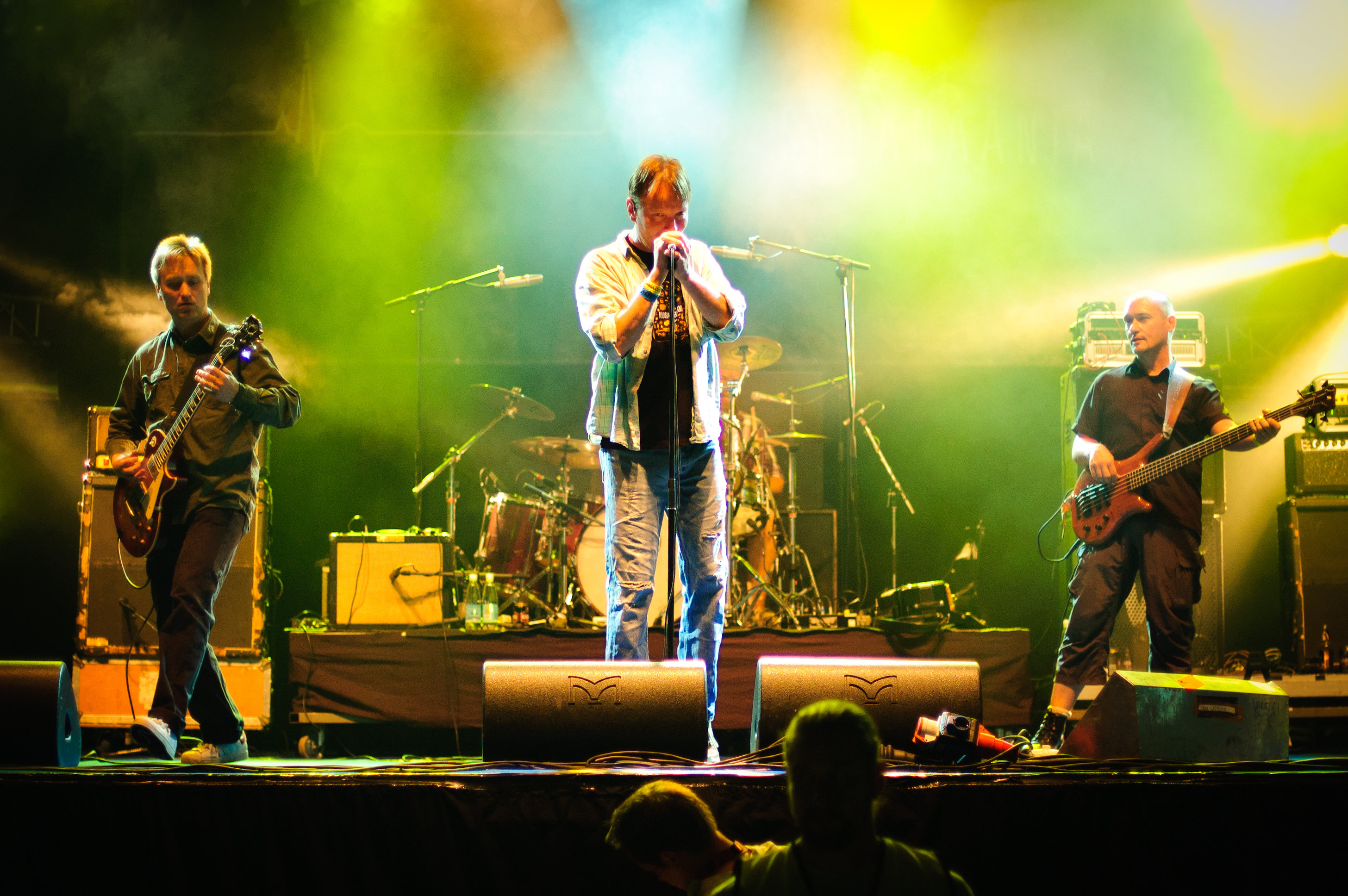
- Kolmas Nainen performing at a comeback concert in 2010

Background information
- Origin: Alavus, Finland
- Genres: Rock
- Years active: 1982–1994; 2009–present (comeback period)
- Members: Pauli Hanhiniemi (1982–2004); Pasi Kallioniemi (1982–2004); Raimo Valkama (1982–2004); Sakari Pesola (1982–2004); Timo Löyvä (1982–1989); Timo Kivikangas (1989–1994)
- Website: www.kolmasnainen.net

Kolmas Nainen (literally "The Third Woman" in Finnish) is a successful Finnish rock band established in 1982 in Alavus was fronted by Pauli Hanhiniemi and came to fame after taking part in the 1984 Rockin SM-kisat, a rock music competition. The band survived for a decade releasing 7 studio albums in addition to a number of live albums, DVDs and compilations. The band is enjoying a comeback since 2009 with a string of new studio and compilation releases.

== Members ==
The original band was made up of:

- Pauli Hanhiniemi – vocals, keyboards, harmonica, accordion
- Pasi Kallioniemi – drums, backing vocals
- Raimo Valkama – bass
- Sakari Pesola – guitar and backing vocals
- Timo Löyvä – guitar (1982–1989)

After guitarist Timo Löyvä left in 1989, he was replaced by:

- Timo Kivikangas – guitar (1989–1994)

== 2009 comeback ==
The band broke up in 1994, but continued performing on brief occasions owing to its popularity. In 2009, it made a big comeback with the release of the album Sydänääniä' that topped the Finnish Albums Chart and the follow-up Me ollaan ne that reached number 2 in the same chart.

== Discography ==
=== Kolmas Nainen ===
==== Studio albums ====
- 1986: Kolmas Nainen
- 1987: Paha minut iski
- 1989: Hikiset siivut
- 1990: Hyvää ja kaunista
- 1991: Elämän tarkoitus
- 1992: Tiheän sisään
- 1994: Onnen oikotiellä

Live albums

- 1992: Ajatuskatkoja (EP)
- 2000: Rattle & Snake

==== DVDs ====
- 2004: Lauteilla (DVD+CD)

==== Compilations ====
- 1988: Poikavuodet
- 1993: Kultahippuja
- 1996: Master series
- 1998: Ura – 38 maamerkkiä matkan varrelta (peaked FINLAND: #2)

==== Singles ====
- 1984: "Olen sekaisin / Mennä vai no? / Etsikää Asseri" (Rock Club – live)
- 1985: "Vanhat äijät / Etsikää Asseri"
- 1986: "Sähkökitara, hyvää tahtoa ja kavereita / Mies vain hymyilee"
- 1986: "Krokotiilikuppila / Asserin kapakkaan"
- 1987: "Maanantai / Raatona maantiellä"
- 1988: "Sylistäsi heräsin / Aikamiespoika"
- 1988: "Onneksi voin unohtaa / Vuoret tuuli pois puhaltaa"
- 1989: "Äiti pojastaan pappia toivoi / Hikiset siivut"
- 1989: "Lentojätkä ja tyttökulta / Jos se ois helppoo"
- 1989: "Päivät kuluu hukkaan / Valehtelisin jos väittäisin"
- 1990: "Tästä asti aikaa / Bussiraiskan surumarssi"
- 1990: "Hyvää ja kaunista / Talot ja tienhaarat"
- 1991: "Lautalla / Helsinki"
- 1991: "Elämän tarkoitus / Ote talon kirjasta"
- 1992: "Niin sen täytyi olla / Tango taisteluni / Lentojätkä ja tyttökulta" (live)
- 1992: "Paskanhajua / Uneni on vasta alussa"
- 1993: "Onpa kadulla mittaa! / Iloisen merimiehen laulu / Onpa kadulla mittaa (soulversio)"
- 1993: "Onneksi voin unohtaa (live) / Kovalla kädellä (live) / Vuoret tuuli pois puhaltaa (remix)"
- 1994: "Ooh, Sammy! / Oi Suomen nuoria / Ooh, Sammy! (rock version)"
- 1994: "Kai mä tästäkin toivun / Jerusalemin suutari (viuluversio)"
- 1995: "En oo kuullu mitään / Pyörteeseen"
- 1998: "Elämän tarkoitus (jousiversio 98) / Maailma on tyly (Provinssi 97 live)"
- 1999: "Sekunnit ja tunnit"

=== Kolmas Nainen (Comeback period) (2009–) ===
==== Albums ====
Year	Album	Peak positions
Year	Album	FIN
2009	Sydänääniä	1
2013	Me ollaan ne	2
2019	Linjassa	4

==== Compilation albums ====
Year	Album	Peak positions
Year	Album	FIN
2010	Tienhaarat – 20 hittiä	–
2011	Maanantai – 15 suosikkia	–
2014	Me - Parhaat levytykset 1985-2013	40

==== Singles ====
- 2009: "Kaiken pitäis muuttuu"
- 2009: "Mitä tapahtuu"
- 2009: "Pilviin"
- 2009: "Pois tilanteesta" (Radio edit)
- 2013: "Me ollaan ne"
