= Nightmare Hour =

Book by R.L. Stine

- Author: R. L. Stine
- Language: English
- Genre: Horror fiction, children's literature
- Published: August 1999
- Publisher: HarperCollins
- Publication place: United States
- Media type: Print (paperback and hardcover)
- Pages: 148
- ISBN: 0-06-028688-1

Nightmare Hour is a 1999 children's horror short stories collection by R. L. Stine. It is composed of 10 different short stories and was a New York Times bestseller from the year 1999 to 2000.

All but "Make Me a Witch" were made into episodes of The Haunting Hour television series. The "Pumpkin Head" story was also adapted into a film called R.L. Stine's Pumpkinhead.

== Stories ==
- "Pumpkinhead"
- "Alien Candy"
- "The Most Evil Sorcerer"
- "Nightmare Inn"
- "I'm Not Martin"
- "The Black Mask"
- "Afraid of Clowns"
- "The Dead Body"
- "Make Me A Witch"
- "The Ghostly Stare"

== Reception ==
Nightmare Hour was on the New York Times bestseller list from 1999 to 2000 and was awarded the Disney Adventures Kids' Choice Award for Best Horror/Mystery Book.

Sofrina Hinton from KidsReads praised the book for its "lavish" illustrations and "clever", direct storytelling and themes, and said that Nightmare Hour is a worthy read for horror fans of any age. Maria Dolan from Amazon commented that these tales will scare the readers so much that they won't be able to put them down. Molly S. Kinney from the Library Journal stated that the book guarantees to produce goosebumps for readers.

== Film adaptation ==
A film directed by Jem Garrard, titled R.L. Stine's Pumpkinhead and based on the short story, was released on Tubi in 2025, with a sequel following a year later.
