= Seth Isaac Johnson =

Canadian actor (born 2000)

- Born: July 10, 2000 (age 26); Canada
- Occupation: Actor
- Years active: 2006–present
- Known for: The Killing

Seth Isaac Johnson (born July 10, 2000) is a Canadian actor, recently known as Finn in 2025 YA Horror, R.L. Stine's Pumpkinhead and Pumpkinhead 2 and Max, in Megan Park's 2024 comedy-drama film My Old Ass, Shawn Raider in Supernatural, as well as the recurring role of Eugene in Season 2 of the hit series Firefly Lane. Early in his career, Johnson was notable for his recurring dramatic role as Denny Larsen in AMC's The Killing. Also as Danny in Nickelodeon's original TV movie Splitting Adam.

== Life and career ==
Seth landed his first major role in AMC's dark crime drama The Killing. Appearing in over 20 episodes, Seth delivered a raw performance as the younger brother of a murdered girl. Award-winning director Patty Jenkins wrote of Seth, "He is truly exceptional and gifted beyond his years...He was a joy to work with in all regards and it was this and his talent that helped create the masterful series "The Killing” became.

Seth was nominated for a Best Guest Star Performance for his role of Shawn Raider in the TV Series Supernatural, at the 2018 Leo Awards. He completed a degree in Behavioral Neuroscience while filming recurring role in Netflix series Firefly Lane before spending his first summer out of school filming Writer/Director Megan Parks Sundance hit, My Old Ass, in Muskoka.

Seth is the son of actor Tanis Dolman and musician Jason O. Johnson.

== Filmography ==
=== Film and television ===
Year	Title	Role	Notes
2010	Badass Thieves	Carter	
2011	To the Mat	Wade	
2011–12	The Killing	Denny Larsen	26 episodes
2012	Mr. Young	Burlap Sack E.T.	1 episode
2013	Motive	Phillip Harper	
2014	The Color of Rain	Drew Kell	
2015	Splitting Adam	Danny	
2015	Into the Grizzly Maze	Young Beckett	
2016	My Sweet Audrina	Arden Lowe (age 15)	
2016	Young & Reckless	Bryce	5 episodes
2017	Mech-X4	Langley	1 episode
2017	The Dangers of Online Dating	Taylor	1 episode
2017	Supernatural	Shawn Raider	1 episode
2017	Last Night in Suburbia	Brent	
2018	Once Upon a Time	Young Hansel	1 episode
2019	iZombie	Freylich	3 episodes
2021	Firefly Lane	Eugene	5 episodes
2021	Love in full swing	Hudson Brandon	
2022	Love Amongst the Stars	Bryce	
2022	Let's Get Physical	Ben Martin	
2024	My Old Ass	Max LaBrant	
2025	In the Shadow of the Sequoia	Vale	
2025	R.L. Stine's Pumpkinhead	Finn	
2026	R.L. Stine's Pumpkinhead 2	Finn	

== Awards and nominations ==
Johnson was nominated for "Best Performance in a TV Series (Comedy or Drama) - Supporting Young Actor The Killing (2011) category at the 34th Young Artist Awards.

Johnson was 2015 Joey Award Winner Best Actor in a Feature for his portrayal of Beckett in Into the Grizzly Maze.

Johnson was nominated for “Best Guest Performance” for his portrayal of Shawn Raider in the Supernatural episode “Advanced Thanatology” in the 2018 Leo Awards.
