= The Haunting Hour: The Series =

Children's horror anthology television series

- Genre: Horror; Science fiction Supernatural; Dark fantasy Comedy drama
- Based on: The Haunting Hour: Chills in the Dead of Night and Nightmare Hour by R. L. Stine
- Theme music composer: John Sereda; Paul Michael Thomas
- Countries of origin: Canada; United States
- Original language: English
- No. of seasons: 4
- No. of episodes: 76 (list of episodes)

Production
- Executive producers: Dan Angel; Kim Arnott; Billy Brown; Harvey Kahn
- Cinematography: Micheael Balfry
- Production companies: The Hatchery; Incendo Films; Front Street Pictures

Original release
- Network: Hub Network (2010–2014); Discovery Family (2014)
- Release: October 29, 2010 – November 29, 2014

R. L. Stine's The Haunting Hour: The Series is a children's horror anthology television series based on the 2001 short stories collection The Haunting Hour: Chills in the Dead of Night and the 1999 short stories collection Nightmare Hour by R. L. Stine, which originally aired on The Hub Network (now Discovery Family) from October 29, 2010, to October 11, 2014. The only story taken from The Haunting Hour anthology was My Imaginary Friend, and the only story unused from The Nightmare Hour was Make Me a Witch. The fourth season's seven remaining episodes ran on Discovery Family in October and November 2014. The series was produced by Canada-based Front Street Pictures, The Hatchery, Incendo Films, and Endemol.

R. L. Stine's The Haunting Hour was one of four original series from The Hub that won the CINE Golden Eagle Award for high quality production and storytelling in 2012.

The show was cancelled in December 2014 after its run of four seasons.

== Premise ==
Like Goosebumps, every episode features a different cast in a scary situation that would involve ghosts, aliens, witches, zombies, and monsters, but the storylines are much darker than its aforementioned predecessor and some episodes serve as dark morality tales. Unlike the Goosebumps series, the threat of death is not implied, being both clear and permanent. In addition, death in the show is not limited to antagonists and minor characters with some stories even ending with the main protagonist(s) being killed. There are some episodes that have twist endings, but there are some episodes that have happy endings similar to most of the episodes of Are You Afraid of the Dark? which had this formula.

== Episodes ==
Season	Episodes	Originally released	
Season	Episodes	First released	Last released
1	22	October 29, 2010	May 14, 2011
2	18	October 1, 2011	February 4, 2012
3	26	October 13, 2012	December 21, 2013
4	10	October 4, 2014	November 29, 2014

== Production ==
Prior to the broadcast of the series, series creator R. L. Stine reported via Twitter that The Haunting Hour: The Series was similar to his previous series Goosebumps. The series was filmed in Vancouver, British Columbia.

In Canada, the show aired on Teletoon from 2011–2014 when the show was moved to YTV, which aired reruns until 2017.

== Music ==
American actress Debby Ryan recorded the song "Made Of Matches" for the episode "Wrong Number", where Ryan appears as a singer. The song was written and produced by Ryan. A music video premiered on The Hub on February 4, 2011, directed by Neill Fearnley with scenes from the episode.

== Home media ==
Name	Release date	Episodes	Region	Additional information
Volume One	September 4, 2012	5	1	Episodes include: Really You, Part 1; Really You, Part 2; A Creature Was Stirring; The Dead Body; and Nightmare Inn.; Bonus features include: Original Promos and Behind The Screams of select episodes.
Volume Two	September 4, 2012	5	1	Episodes include: The Red Dress, Ghostly Stare, The Walls, Game Over, and Alien Candy.; Bonus features include: Original Promos and Behind The Screams of select episodes.
Volume Three	February 5, 2013	5	1	Episodes include: Fear Never Knocks, Best Friend Forever, Black Mask, My Sister the Witch, and Catching Cold.; Bonus features include: Original Promos and Behind The Screams of select episodes.
Volume Four	February 5, 2013	5	1	Episodes include: Wrong Number, Afraid of Clowns, Pool Shark, Lights Out, and The Perfect Brother.; Bonus features include: Original Promos and Behind The Screams of select episodes.
Volume Five	September 3, 2013	5	1	Episodes include: Scary Mary, Part 1; Scary Mary, Part 2; Pumpkinhead; Flight; and Swarmin' Norman.
Volume Six	September 3, 2013	5	1	Episodes include: Creature Feature, Part 1, Creature Feature, Part 2, Brush With Madness, Sick, and Mascot.

== Accolades ==
Year	Award	Category	Recipient	Result	Ref.
2012	Young Artist Awards	Best Performance in a TV Series - Guest Starring Young Actor 14-17	Ricardo Hoyos	Nominated	
2012	Young Artist Awards	Best Performance in a TV Series - Guest Starring Young Actor 11-13	Baljodh Nagra	Won	
2012	Young Artist Awards	Best Performance in a TV Series - Guest Starring Young Actor 11-13	Dakota Goyo	Nominated	
2012	Young Artist Awards	Best Performance in a TV Series - Guest Starring Young Actor 11-13	Jason Spevack	Nominated	
2012	Young Artist Awards	Best Performance in a TV Series - Guest Starring Young Actress 11-13	Ava Rebecca Hughes	Nominated	
2012	Young Artist Awards	Best Performance in a TV Series - Guest Starring Young Actress 11-13	Jessica Mcleod	Nominated	
2013	Young Artist Awards	Best Performance in a TV Series - Guest Starring Young Actor 14-21	Donnie MacNeil	Nominated	
2013	Young Artist Awards	Best Performance in a TV Series - Guest Starring Young Actress Ten and Under	Alissa Skobye	Nominated	
2013	Emmy Awards	Outstanding Costume Design/Styling	Farnaz Khaki-Sadigh and Natalie Simon	Won	
2013	Emmy Awards	Outstanding Hairstyling	Trudy Parisien and Cara Doell	Won	
2013	Emmy Awards	Outstanding Children's Series	Dan Angel, Billy Brown, Harvey Kahn, Kim Arnott, Jane Stine, Joan Waricha, Charles Lyall and Dawn Knight	Won	
2014	Young Artist Awards	Best Performance in a TV Series - Guest Starring Young Actress 17-21	Laine MacNeil	Nominated	
2014	Young Artist Awards	Best Performance in a TV Series - Guest Starring Young Actress 11-13	Rowan Rycroft	Nominated	
2014	Young Artist Awards	Best Performance in a TV Series - Guest Starring Young Actress 10 and Under	Jena Skodje	Won	
2014	Emmy Awards	Outstanding Children's Series	Dan Angel, Kim Arnott, Billy Brown, Harvey Kahn, Dawn Knight, Jane Stine, Joan Waricha, Charles Lyall and Oliver De Caigny	Won	
2015	Emmy Awards	Outstanding Children's Series	Dan Angel, Kim Arnott, Billy Brown, Harvey Kahn, Dawn Knight, Mandy Spencer-Phillips, Ted Biaselli, Allen Lewis, Margaret Loesch, Juliet Smith, Jane Stine, Joan Waricha, and Marnie Young	Won	
2015	Emmy Awards	Outstanding Art Direction/Set Decoration/Scenic Design	Teresa Weston, Michael Corrado and Josh Plaw	Won	
2015	Emmy Awards	Outstanding Performer in a Children's or Pre-School Children's Series	Margot Kidder as Mrs. Worthington (for "Mrs. Worthington")	Won	

== Books ==
In 2001, Stine released The Haunting Hour: Chills in the Dead of Night, a collection of 10 short stories featuring illustrations by various artists. A reviewer for the Tampa Bay Times wrote favorably of the collection and stated that it would be best for children over the age of eight. Booklist was also favorable.

== See also ==
- Are You Afraid of the Dark?
- Bone Chillers
- Goosebumps (1995 TV series)
- Goosebumps (2023 TV series)
- The Nightmare Room
