= Anselmi: The Young Werewolf =

- Original Finnish poster.
- Anselmi – nuori ihmissusi
- Directed by: Matti Pekkanen
- Written by: Matti Pekkanen
- Produced by: Mikko Soukkala
- Starring: Aleksi Holkko; Sami Palolampi; Liisa Ruuskanen; Pauli Hanhiniemi
- Cinematography: Matti Pekkanen
- Edited by: Matti Pekkanen
- Music by: Tapani Siirtola
- Production company: Bottomland Productions Oy
- Distributed by: Black Lion Pictures
- Release date: 24 January 2014
- Running time: 80 min
- Language: Finnish

Anselmi: The Young Werewolf (Finnish: Anselmi – nuori ihmissusi) is a 2014 Finnish werewolf-themed fantasy film written and directed by Matti Pekkanen. The film's story is set in 1980s South Ostrobothnia, where a 15-year-old boy named Anselmi, who lives in a small village with his father Manu, struggles with the challenges of puberty and tries to find out the fate of his missing mother. Aleksi Holkko stars in the film's title role. Other actors include the Finnish singer Pauli Hanhiniemi and the American actor Ron Jeremy.

The soundtrack of the film includes the song "Hysteria" performed by Free Spirit.

== Premise ==
Anselmi (Aleksi Holkko), a high school student who is awakening to his sexuality, lives on a farm with his father Manu (Sami Palolampi); Anselmi's mother Eeva (Liisa Ruuskanen) has disappeared 15 years earlier on the night of her son's baptism. Anselmi experiences frequent nightmares and uncontrollable changes in his body. Secrets begin to be revealed when Manu and the local vicar (Pauli Hanhiniemi) reveal the truth about the mother's fate and his true origin.

== Cast ==
- Aleksi Holkko as Anselmi
- Sami Palolampi as Manu
- Liisa Ruuskanen as Eeva
- Reetta Kankare as Milla
- Pauli Hanhiniemi as vicar
- Sami Alho as youth pastor Sampsa
- Timo Saari as inseminator
- Topi Kohonen as shepherd
- Ron Jeremy as Roni

== Production ==
The film's script, written by Matti Pekkanen, is based on the original idea by Sami Palolampi, which had been born in his mind already in the 90s. The film's script has been edited several times since then. The film is associated with the old script versions only by its name.

The Tampere-based production company Bottomland Productions Oy, founded by Pekkanen and Mikko Soukkala, was responsible for the production of the film. The production of the film started already in 2009, when Pekkanen and Soukkala directed a short film of the same name that was just over three minutes long, before it was decided to make the full-length film. The feature film was shot in Ähtäri, Alavus, Kangasala, Lempäälä, Virrat and Tampere, among other places.

== Release ==
Anselmi: The Young Werewolf was premiered on January 24, 2014.

The film was nominated in 13 categories for the Kalevi Award in 2015. It won the award in nine categories: Best Film, Direction, Actor, Actor, Cinematography, Sound Design, Editing, Music and Special Effects.

== Reception ==
The film's reception has been mostly modest and negative. In the review of Taneli Topelius from Ilta-Sanomat, "the name of the film, which was created by hobbyists, promises a little too much" and that "the shots that look good barely help to swallow the story as well, even if its sloppiness takes too far away from the main point." Veli-Pekka Lehtonen from Helsingin Sanomat only gave the film one star, saying that "the film will remain in Finnish film history mainly as a work with the American porn actor Ron Jeremy in a cameo role." Henri Walter Rehnström from Turun Sanomat thinks that "the movie conveys more the passion of the creators than the actual skill of making." Klas Fransberg from Vasabladet considered the film's "crammed script to be its stumbling block".
