= Jem Garrard =

British director, writer and producer

- Born: 1985 or 1986 (age 40–41); London, U.K.
- Occupations: Director, Producer, Writer
- Years active: 2010–present
- Website: jemgarrard.com

Jem Garrard (1985 or 1986) is the creator and showrunner on the space opera series Vagrant Queen released in 2020, and the award winning mockumentary webseries Android Employed, which ran from 2017 to 2018. They directed the fourth series of comedy-drama You Me Her in 2019, and episodes of Wynonna Earp and Motherland: Fort Salem. Garrard has been nominated for a daytime Emmy award for Mech-X4 and won a Leo Award in 2018.

== Filmography ==
Year	Title	Position	Notes	Ref
2013	Playground	Director, cinematographer	Season 1, 4 eps.	
2015	Guns to Mics	Director, cinematographer	Documentary	
2016	The Switch	Director, Story Editor	Season 1	
2016	Murderer Upstairs	Director	TV movie	
2017	Christmas at Holly Lodge	Director	TV movie	
2017-2018	Android Employed	Creator, Director	Season 1 + 2, 8 eps.	
2017-2018	Mech-X4	Director	Season 2, 4 eps.	
2018	Cooking with Love	Director	TV movie	
2018	Killer High	Director	TV movie	
2019	You Me Her	Director	Season 4	
2020	Vagrant Queen	Executive Producer, Director, Created for Television by, Showrunner		
2021	Wynonna Earp	Director	Season 4, Episode #46: "Crazy"	
2021	Day of the Dead	Director	Episodes 8-10: "To Anyone Who Can Hear My Voice"/ "Death Comes to Paymart"	
2022	Charmed	Director	Episode 66: "Cats And Camels and Elephants, Oh My"	
2023	Nancy Drew	Director	Episode 52: "The Danger of the Hopeful Sigil"	
2024	Sight Unseen	Director	"Sunny", "Mia"	
2024	Slay	Director, writer		
2024	Invasive	Director, writer		
2025	R.L. Stine's Pumpkinhead	Director, writer		
2025	Invasive 2	Director, writer		
2026	Buzzkill	Director	Written by Suzanne Keilly	
2026	R.L. Stine's Pumpkinhead 2	Director, writer		

== Awards and nominations ==
Year	Awarding Body/Event	Award	Work	Result	Ref
2015	LA Film Festival	LAIFF July Award for Best Comedy/Dramedy	The Wolf Who Came to Dinner	Nominated	
2016	Juggernaut: A Sci-Fi and Fantasy Film Festival	Hecate Female Filmmaker Award	The Wolf Who Came to Dinner	Nominated	
2016	Canada Shorts Film Festival	Disappeared		Finalist	
2016	East Van Showcase	Jury Prize for Best Short Film	Haunted Saloon	Won	
2018	Banff World Media Festival	Banff Rockie Award for Best Digital Fiction Series	Android Employed	Nominated	
2018	Leo Awards	Best Music, Comedy, or Variety Program or Series	Android Employed	Nominated	
2018	Leo Awards	Best Direction in a Music, Comedy, or Variety Program or Series	Android Employed	Nominated	
2018	Leo Awards	Best Screenwriting in a Music, Comedy, or Variety Program or Series	Android Employed, episode "The Second Unit Team"	Won	
2018	Leo Awards	Best Direction in a Youth or Children's Program or Series	Mech-X4, episode "X4 Versus The Dark Night"	Nominated	
2019	46th Daytime Emmy Awards	Outstanding Directing for a Children's, Preschool Children's or Family Viewing Program	Mech-X4	Nominated	
2019	Directors Guild of Canada	Outstanding Directorial Achievement	Killer High	Nominated	
