= 27th Japan Academy Film Prize =

Japanese film awards in 2004

- Date: February 20, 2004
- Site: Grand Prince Hotel New Takanawa, Tokyo, Japan
- Hosted by: Hiroshi Sekiguchi; Rie Miyazawa

Highlights
- Best Picture: When the Last Sword is Drawn
- Most awards: Zatōichi (5)
- Most nominations: Like Asura (13)

The 27th Japan Academy Film Prize (第27回日本アカデミー賞) is the 27th edition of the Japan Academy Film Prize, an award presented by the Nippon Academy-Sho Association to award excellence in filmmaking. It awarded the best films of 2003 and it took place on February 20, 2004, at the Grand Prince Hotel New Takanawa in Tokyo, Japan.

== Nominees ==
=== Awards ===
Picture of the Year	Director of the Year
When the Last Sword Is Drawn; Like Asura; Bayside Shakedown 2; Zatōichi; Spy Sorge	Yoshimitsu Morita – Like Asura; Akihiko Shiota – Yomigaeri; Masahiro Shinoda – Spy Sorge; Yōjirō Takita – When the Last Sword Is Drawn; Katsuyuki Motohiro – Bayside Shakedown 2
Screenplay of the Year	Popularity Award
Tomomi Tsutsui – Like Asura; Isshin Inudo, Hiroshi Saitō, Akihiko Shiota – Yomigaeri; Ryoichi Kimizuka – Bayside Shakedown 2; Masahiro Shinoda and Robert Mundi – Spy Sorge; Tomoyuki Furumaya – Robot Contest	Bayside Shakedown 2 (Production Category); Aya Ueto – Azumi (Actor Category)
Outstanding Performance by an Actor in a Leading Role	Outstanding Performance by an Actress in a Leading Role
Kiichi Nakai – When the Last Sword Is Drawn; Yūji Oda – Bayside Shakedown 2; Toshiyuki Nishida – Get Up!; Tatsuya Fujiwara – Battle Royale II: Requiem	Shinobu Terajima – Akame 48 Waterfalls; Aya Ueto – Azumi; Shinobu Otake – Like Asura; Yūko Takeuchi – Yomigaeri; Alisa Mizuki – My House
Outstanding Performance by an Actor in a Supporting Role	Outstanding Performance by an Actress in a Supporting Role
Kōichi Satō – When the Last Sword Is Drawn; Tadanobu Asano – Zatōichi; Nakamura Shidō II – Like Asura; Yūji Miyake – When the Last Sword Is Drawn; Toshirō Yanagiba – Bayside Shakedown 2	Eri Fukatsu – Like Asura; Michiyo Okusu – Zatōichi; Miki Nakatani – When the Last Sword Is Drawn; Eri Fukatsu – Bayside Shakedown 2; Kaoru Yachigusa – Like Asura
Outstanding Achievement in Music	Outstanding Achievement in Cinematography
Keiichi Suzuki – Zatōichi; Shin’ichirō Ikebe – Spy Sorge; Michiru Ōshima – Like Asura; Akira Senju – Yomigaeri; Akihiko Matsumoto – Bayside Shakedown 2	Katsumi Yanagishima – Zatōichi; Nobuyasu Kita – Like Asura; Tatsuo Suzuki – Spy Sorge; Takeshi Hamada – When the Last Sword Is Drawn; Osamu Fujiishi – Bayside Shakedown 2
Outstanding Achievement in Lighting Direction	Outstanding Achievement in Art Direction
Hitoshi Takaya – Zatōichi; Kōichi Watanabe – Like Asura; Hideshi Mikami – Spy Sorge; Tatsuya Osada – When the Last Sword Is Drawn; Hiroyuki Kase – Bayside Shakedown 2	Hajime Oikawa – Spy Sorge; Norihiro Isoda – Zatōichi; Kyōko Heya – Onmyoji; Kyōko Heya – When the Last Sword Is Drawn; Hidemitsu Yamazaki – Like Asura
Outstanding Achievement in Sound Recording	Outstanding Achievement in Film Editing
Senji Horiuchi – Zatōichi; Kunio Ashihara – Bayside Shakedown 2; Osamu Onodera – When the Last Sword Is Drawn; Tetsuo Segawa – Spy Sorge; Fumio Hashimoto – Like Asura	Takeshi Kitano and Yoshinori Ōta – Zatōichi; Hiroshi Okuda – Spy Sorge; Takuya Taguchi – Bayside Shakedown 2; Shinji Tanaka – Like Asura; Isao Tomita and Nobuko Tomita – When the Last Sword Is Drawn
Outstanding Foreign Language Film	Newcomer of the Year
The Pianist; Chicago; The Hours; My Sassy Girl; The Lord of the Rings: The Two Towers	Hayato Ichihara – Gūzen ni mo Saiaku na Shōnen; Joe Odagiri – Azumi; Naohito Fujiki – Game; Satomi Ishihara – Watashi no Grandpa; Masami Nagasawa – Robot Contest
Special Award from the Chairman	
Shirō Sasaki (Producer); Hiroyuki Fukushima; Seizō Fukumoto (Actor)	
