= Masane Tsukayama =

Japanese actor, voice actor, narrator (born 1944)

- 津嘉山 正種
- Born: February 6, 1944 (age 82); Naha, Okinawa, Japan
- Occupations: Actor, voice actor, narrator
- Years active: 1964–present
- Agent: Seinenza Theater Company
- Spouse: Echiko Narita

Masane Tsukayama (津嘉山 正種, Tsukayama Masane; born February 6, 1944) is a Japanese actor, voice actor, and narrator from Naha, Okinawa. His wife is opera singer Echiko Narita (成田 絵智子, Narita Echiko). He is best known for dubbing over Kevin Costner, Robert De Niro, Richard Gere, Liam Neeson and Gabriel Byrne.

In 2021, Tsukayama won the Merit Award at the 15th Seiyu Awards.

== Filmography ==
=== Film ===
- Otoko wa Tsurai yo series
  - Talk of the Town Tora-san (1978) (Painter)
  - Tora's Tropical Fever (1980) (Dr. Chinen)
  - Hearts and Flowers for Tora-san (1982) (Kanbara)
  - Tora-san's Forbidden Love (1984) (Manager)
  - Tora-san Confesses (1991) (Kitano)
- Bayside Shakedown series
  - Bayside Shakedown: The Movie (1998) (Shizuo Ikegami)
  - Bayside Shakedown 2 (2005) (Shizuo Ikegami)
  - Bayside Shakedown 3 (2010) (Shizuo Ikegami)
  - Bayside Shakedown: The Final (2012) (Shizuo Ikegami)
- Okinawan Boys (1983)
- Final Take (1986)
- Dora-heita (2000)
- Silk (2006) (Director)
- Shizumanu Taiyō (2009) (Vice-President of NAL)
- Our Homeland (2012) (Seong-ho's father)
- Snow on the Blades (2014)
- Chihayafuru Part 1 (2016) (Hajime Wataya)
- Chihayafuru Part 2 (2016) (Hajime Wataya)
- Life and Death On the Shore (2017) (Toe's father)
- Recall (2018)
- The Lies She Loved (2018)
- Fukushima 50 (2020)
- Aristocrats (2021)
- Akira Shimada (2021) (Narrator)
- The Life of Chiyoko Ito (2022) (Iwanami)
- Silence of the Sea (2024)
- Step Out (2025)
- Utakata (2025)

=== Television drama ===
- Kunitori Monogatari (1973) (Mōri Shinsuke)
- G-Men '75 (1981)
- Sanga Moyu (1984) (Hirai)
- Musashibō Benkei (1986) (Fujiwara no Yasuhira)
- Kasuga no Tsubone (1989) (Katagiri Katsumoto)
- Long Vacation (1996) (Kazuhisa Odajima)
- Bayside Shakedown (1997) (Shizuo Ikegami)
- Oda Nobunaga: Tenka wo Totta Baka (1998) (Hayashi Hidesada)
- Aoi (2000) (Ishida Masazumi)
- Hōjō Tokimune (2001) (Miura Yasumura)
- Doremisora (2002)
- Good Luck!! (2003) (Hiroki Natsukawa)
- Kōmyō ga Tsuji (2006) (Mōri Terumoto)
- Umechan Sensei (2012) (Sinzo Hayano)
- Yae's Sakura (2013) (Jinbo Kuranosuke)
- Ishitsubute (2017)
- Everyone's Demoted (2019) (Narimichi Gōda)
- Chimudondon (2022) (Genji Kadekaru)
- Drops of God (2023)
- Galápagos (2023)

=== Television animation ===
- Blocker Gundan 4 Machine Blaster (1976) (Billy Kenshirō, Narrator)
- Dokaben (1976) (Hayato Kagemaru)
- Mechander Robo (1977) (General Ozmel)
- The Wonderful Adventures of Nils (1980) (Nils' father)
- Ulysses 31 (1988, Nagoya TV edition) (Ulysses)
- Lupin III: Bye-Bye Liberty Crisis (1989) (Jimmy Kantz)
- Lupin III: In Memory of the Walther P-38 / Island of Assassins (1997) (Doctor)
- Witch Hunter Robin (2002) (Father Juliano Colegui)
- Fullmetal Alchemist (2004) (Karl Haushofer)
- Akagi (2006) (Iwao Washizu)
- Intrigue in the Bakumatsu – Irohanihoheto (2006) (Narrator)
- Kaiji (2008) (Kazutaka Hyōdō)
- Neuro: Supernatural Detective (2008) (Eisuke Harukawa, HAL)
- Fate/Zero (2011) (Zōken Matō)
- Kaiji: Hakairoku-hen (2011) (Kazutaka Hyōdō)
- Magic Kaito 1412 (2015) (Harry Nezu)
- Ninja Slayer From Animation (2015) (Laomoto Khan)
- Mr. Tonegawa: Middle Management Blues (2018) (Kazutaka Hyōdō)
- One Piece (2018-2023) (Gol D. Roger, replacing Chikao Ohtsuka, replaced by Shunsuke Sakuya)
- Persona 5: The Animation (2018-2019) (Igor)
- Blade Runner: Black Lotus (2021) (Senator Bannister)

=== Original video animation (OVA) ===
- Crystal Triangle(1987) (Koichiro Kamishiro)
- The Silent Service (1995) (Shirō Kaieda)
- Legend of the Galactic Heroes (1997) (Ernst von Eisenach)

=== Theatrical animation ===
- Street Fighter II: The Animated Movie (1994) (Guile)
- Jungle Emperor Leo (1997) (Leo)
- Crayon Shin-chan: The Storm Called: The Adult Empire Strikes Back (2001) (Ken)
- Doraemon: Nobita and the Winged Braves (2001) (Icarus)
- Detective Conan: The Phantom of Baker Street (2002) (Thomas Schindler)
- éX-Driver (2002) (Rico Ganbino)
- Millennium Actress (2002) (Scarred man)
- Steamboy (2004) (James Edward Steam)
- Fullmetal Alchemist the Movie: Conqueror of Shamballa (2005) (Karl Haushofer)
- Gantz: O (2016) (Nurarihyon)
- Fate/stay night: Heaven's Feel (2017) (Zoken Matō)

=== Video games ===
- Fate/stay night Realta Nua (2007) (Zōken Matō)
- White Knight Chronicles (2008) (Eldore)
- Persona 5 (2016) (False Igor and Yaldabaoth)
- Yakuza 6: The Song of Life (2016) (Heizo Iwami)
- A Certain Magical Index: Imaginary Fest (2020) (High Priest)
- Cyberpunk 2077 (2020) (Saburo Arasaka)

=== Drama CD ===
- Fate/Zero (xxxx) (Zōken Matō)

=== Dubbing ===
==== Live-action ====
- Kevin Costner
  - No Way Out (TV Tokyo and TV Asahi editions) (Lt. Cmdr. Tom Farrell)
  - The Untouchables (2003 TV Tokyo edition) (Eliot Ness)
  - Bull Durham ("Crash" Davis)
  - Field of Dreams (Ray Kinsella)
  - Dances with Wolves (Lieutenant John J. Dunbar)
  - Revenge (1991 TV Asahi edition) (Michael J. "Jay" Cochran)
  - Robin Hood: Prince of Thieves (Robin Hood)
  - JFK (Jim Garrison)
  - The Bodyguard (Frank Farmer)
  - A Perfect World (Robert 'Butch' Haynes)
  - Wyatt Earp (Wyatt Earp)
  - Waterworld (2002 TV Tokyo edition) (The Mariner)
  - Tin Cup (Roy "Tin Cup" McAvoy)
  - The Postman (The Postman)
  - For Love of the Game (2003 TV Asahi edition) (Billy Chapel)
  - 3000 Miles to Graceland (Thomas J. Murphy)
  - Dragonfly (Dr. Joe Darrow)
  - Open Range (Charley Waite)
  - The New Daughter (John James)
  - Man of Steel (Jonathan Kent)
  - 3 Days to Kill (Ethan Renner)
- Robert De Niro
  - Taxi Driver (1981 TBS edition) (Travis Bickle)
  - Once Upon a Time in America (1988 TV Asahi edition) (David "Noodles" Aaronson)
  - Angel Heart (1989 Fuji TV edition) (Louis Cyphre)
  - Mary Shelley's Frankenstein (The Creature)
  - Casino (Sam "Ace" Rothstein)
  - Heat (Neil McCauley)
  - The Fan (Gil Renard)
  - Cop Land (Lt. Moe Tilden)
  - Jackie Brown (Louis Gara)
  - Ronin (2004 Fuji TV edition) (Sam)
  - Analyze This (Paul Vitti)
  - Men of Honor (Leslie Sunday)
- Liam Neeson
  - Star Wars: Episode I – The Phantom Menace (Qui-Gon Jinn)
  - Gangs of New York ("Priest" Vallon)
  - Kinsey (Alfred Kinsey)
  - The Chronicles of Narnia: The Lion, the Witch and the Wardrobe (Aslan)
  - Batman Begins (2007 NTV edition) (Henri Ducard)
  - Breakfast on Pluto (Father Liam)
  - Kingdom of Heaven (Godfrey of Ibelin)
  - Seraphim Falls (Carver)
  - The Chronicles of Narnia: Prince Caspian (Aslan)
  - The Chronicles of Narnia: The Voyage of the Dawn Treader (Aslan)
  - Clash of the Titans (Zeus)
  - Wrath of the Titans (Zeus)
  - Third Person (Michael)
- Gabriel Byrne
  - The Usual Suspects (Dean Keaton)
  - The Man in the Iron Mask (D'Artagnan)
  - End of Days (2001 TV Asahi edition) (Satan)
  - Emmett's Mark (Jack Marlow/Stephen Bracken)
  - Shade (Charlie Miller)
- Apollo 13 (1999 NTV edition) (Gene Kranz (Ed Harris))
- Black Hawk Down (2004 TV Tokyo edition) (William F. Garrison (Sam Shepard))
- Bram Stoker's Dracula (Count Dracula (Gary Oldman))
- Casablanca (2000 TV Tokyo edition) (Rick Blaine (Humphrey Bogart))
- Chicago (Billy Flynn (Richard Gere))
- Das Boot (1983 Fuji TV edition) (1st Watch Officer (Hubertus Bengsch))
- Dawn of the Dead (1980 TV Tokyo edition) (Stephen "Flyboy" Andrews (David Emge))
- Dracula (1982 TV Asahi edition) (Jonathan Harker (Trevor Eve))
- Drunken Master (Thunderleg Yen Tie Hsin / Thunderfoot (Hwang Jang-lee))
- Exorcist: The Beginning (Father Lankester Merrin (Stellan Skarsgård))
- Fist of Fury (Chen Zhen (Bruce Lee))
- From the Earth to the Moon (Christopher Kraft (Stephen Root))
- Game of Death (Billy Lo (Bruce Lee))
- Good Will Hunting (Professor Gerald Lambeau (Stellan Skarsgård))
- The Guns of Navarone (1986 TBS edition) (Captain Keith Mallory (Gregory Peck))
- Hop (Henry O'Hare (Gary Cole))
- Marked for Death (John Hatcher (Steven Seagal))
- The Mask of Zorro (Don Diego de la Vega (Anthony Hopkins))
- Out for Justice (Detective Gino Felino (Steven Seagal))
- Presumed Innocent (Rozat K. "Rusty" Sabich (Harrison Ford))
- The Rock (1999 NTV edition) (General Francis X. Hummel (Ed Harris))
- Roman Holiday (1992 TBS and 2004 NTV editions) (Joe Bradley (Gregory Peck))
- Shall We Dance? (John Clark (Richard Gere))
- Sleeping with the Enemy (Martin Burney (Patrick Bergin))
- Snake in the Eagle's Shadow (Sheng Kuan (Hwang Jang-lee))
- Species (Xavier Fitch (Ben Kingsley))
- The Sting (1991 TV Asahi edition) (Henry "Shaw" Gondorff (Paul Newman))
- Terminator 2: Judgment Day (Terminator (Arnold Schwarzenegger))
- Terminator 3: Rise of the Machines (2005 NTV edition) (Lieutenant General Robert Brewster (David Andrews))
- The Thing (1985 Fuji TV edition) (MacReady (Kurt Russell))
- Tower of Death (Lee Chen-chiang (Bruce Lee))
- Tucker: The Man and His Dream (Preston Tucker (Jeff Bridges))
- Wall Street (1992 TV Asahi edition) (Gordon Gekko (Michael Douglas))
- Wall Street: Money Never Sleeps (Gordon Gekko (Michael Douglas))

==== Animation ====
- Pocahontas (1995) (Chief Powhatan)
- Pocahontas II: Journey to a New World (1999) (Chief Powhatan)
- Star Wars: Clone Wars (Qui-Gon Jinn)
- Star Wars: The Clone Wars (Qui-Gon Jinn)
- Treasure Planet (2003) (Narrator)
- Yellow Submarine (John Lennon)

== Awards ==
Year	Award	Category	Result	Ref.
2021	15th Seiyu Awards	Merit Award	Won	
