= List of highest-grossing films in Japan =

The following is a list of the highest-grossing films in Japan. This list only accounts for the films' box office earnings at cinemas and not their ancillary revenues (i.e. home video sales, video rentals, television broadcasts, or merchandise sales). Two tables are listed in terms of nominal gross revenue, while the two other tables are listed in terms of box office admissions.

== Highest-grossing films ==
=== Box office revenue ===
Among the films that have grossed over ¥10 billion in Japan, twenty-five are Japanese films.

Films with earnings over ¥10 billion
Rank	Title	Gross revenue (¥ billion)	Year	Ref
1	(Japan) Demon Slayer: Mugen Train	40.75	2020	
2	(Japan) Demon Slayer: Infinity Castle	40.36	2025	
3	(Japan) Spirited Away	31.68	2001	
4	Titanic	27.77	1997	
5	Frozen	25.50	2013	
6	(Japan) Your Name	25.17	2016	
7	(Japan) Princess Mononoke	21.46	1997	
8	(Japan) Kokuho	20.90	2025	
9	(Japan) One Piece Film: Red	20.34	2022	
10	Harry Potter and the Philosopher's Stone	20.30	2001	
11	(Japan) Howl's Moving Castle	19.60	2004	
12	(Japan) Chiikawa the Movie: The Secret of the Mermaid Island †	18.96	2026	
13	(Japan) Bayside Shakedown 2	17.35	2003	
14	Harry Potter and the Chamber of Secrets	17.30	2002	
15	(Japan) The First Slam Dunk	16.67	2022	
16	Avatar	15.90	2009	
17	(Japan) Detective Conan: The Million-dollar Pentagram	15.80	2024	
18	Zootopia 2	15.71	2025	
19	(Japan) Ponyo	15.50	2008	
20	(Japan) Suzume	14.94	2022	
21	(Japan) Detective Conan: One-eyed Flashback	14.74	2025	
22	(Japan) Weathering with You	14.23	2019	
23	The Super Mario Bros. Movie	14.02	2023	
24	(Japan) Detective Conan: Black Iron Submarine	13.88	2023	
25	Top Gun: Maverick	13.81	2022	
26	(Japan) Jujutsu Kaisen 0	13.80	2021	
27	(Japan) Detective Conan: Fallen Angel of the Highway	13.70	2026	
28	The Last Samurai	13.70	2003	
29	Bohemian Rhapsody	13.51	2018	
30	E.T. the Extra-Terrestrial	13.50	1982	
30	Armageddon	13.50	1998	
30	Harry Potter and the Prisoner of Azkaban	13.50	2004	
33	Frozen II	13.37	2019	
34	Toy Story 5	13.04	2026	
35	Jurassic Park	12.85	1993	
36	Star Wars: Episode I – The Phantom Menace	12.70	1999	
37	Beauty and the Beast	12.40	2017	
38	Aladdin	12.16	2019	
39	(Japan) The Wind Rises	12.02	2013	
40	Alice in Wonderland	11.80	2010	
41	(Japan) Haikyu!! The Dumpster Battle	11.64	2024	
42	Star Wars: The Force Awakens	11.63	2015	
43	(Japan) Antarctica	11.00	1983	
43	The Matrix Reloaded	11.00	2003	
43	Finding Nemo	11.00	2003	
43	Harry Potter and the Goblet of Fire	11.00	2005	
47	Pirates of the Caribbean: At World's End	10.90	2007	
48	(Japan) Chainsaw Man – The Movie: Reze Arc	10.81	2025	
49	Toy Story 3	10.80	2010	
50	Independence Day	10.65	1996	
51	The Lord of the Rings: The Return of the King	10.32	2004	
52	(Japan) Evangelion: 3.0+1.0 Thrice Upon a Time	10.28	2021	
53	(Japan) Bayside Shakedown: The Movie	10.10	1998	
54	Toy Story 4	10.09	2019	
55	Pirates of the Caribbean: Dead Man's Chest	10.02	2006	
(Japan) indicates the film is a Japanese production. † Background shading indicates films playing in the week commencing 13 November 2026 in Japanese theaters.

=== Box office admissions ===
The following table lists high-grossing films by the number of box office admissions, which refers to the number of cinema tickets sold at the Japanese box office. Only films that have sold at least 10 million tickets are listed. The list is not ranked, as the list is incomplete.

A separate column lists the gross revenue adjusted for ticket price inflation in 2025, based on data from the Motion Picture Producers Association of Japan (MPPAJ). The adjusted gross revenue is calculated by multiplying the total number of admissions by the average 2025 ticket price (¥1,454). Admissions better reflect the popularity of older films, since they are less susceptible to the effects of inflation. This mainly affects films released prior the 1990s, as there has been very little Japanese ticket price inflation since the 1990s. Where the number of admissions is unknown, they are estimated by dividing the nominal gross revenue by the average ticket price in the year of release (or the distributor rentals by the average rental earnings per ticket) to provide an estimate.

Title	Year	Box office admissions (est.)		Adjusted revenue (est. ¥ billion)
Title	Year	Tickets (millions)	Ref	Adjusted revenue (est. ¥ billion)
(Japan) The War at Sea from Hawaii to Malaya	1942	100.00		100.0
(Japan) Demon Slayer the Movie: Mugen Train	2020	29.43		42.8
(Japan) Demon Slayer: Infinity Castle †	2025	27.49		40.2
(Japan) Spirited Away	2001	24.28		35.3
(Japan) Tokyo Olympiad	1965	23.50		34.2
Frozen	2014	20.03		29.1
(Japan) Emperor Meiji and the Great Russo-Japanese War	1957	20.00		29.1
(Japan) Your Name	2016	19.30		28.1
Titanic	1997	17.43		25.3
Harry Potter and the Philosopher's Stone	2001	16.25		23.6
(Japan) Princess Mononoke	1997	15.55		22.6
(Japan) Howl's Moving Castle	2004	15.50		22.5
(Japan) One Piece Film: Red	2022	14.74		21.4
(Japan) Kokuho †	2025	14.76		20.8
Harry Potter and the Chamber of Secrets	2002	14.20		20.6
(Japan) Bayside Shakedown 2	2003	13.00		18.9
(Japan) Ponyo	2008	12.90		18.8
(Japan) King Kong vs. Godzilla	1962	12.60		18.3
The Last Samurai	2003	12.10		17.6
(Japan) Antarctica	1983	12.00		17.4
Jaws	1975	11.98		17.4
(Japan) The Loyal 47 Ronin	1958	11.74		17.1
(Japan) Sanjuro	1962	11.20		16.0
(Japan) Detective Conan: The Million-dollar Pentagram	2024	11.01		16
Harry Potter and the Prisoner of Azkaban	2004	11.00		16
(Japan) Suzume	2022	10.90		15.8
(Japan) Weathering with You	2019	10.51		15.3
Frozen II	2019	10.44		15.0
(Japan) Detective Conan: One-eyed Flashback	2025	10.13		14.7
Avatar	2011	10.10		14.7
E.T. the Extra-Terrestrial	1982	10.00		14.5
(Japan) indicates the film is a Japanese production. † Background shading indicates films playing in the week commencing 13 November 2026 in Japanese theaters.

== Film franchises and film series ==
=== Box office revenue ===
Film franchise/series	Gross revenue (¥ billion)	Debut year	Ref
(Japan) Detective Conan (Case Closed)	156.32	1997	(Note: See List of Detective Conan films § Box office performance)
(Japan) Doraemon	151.03	1980	(Note: See List of Doraemon films § Box office performance)
Wizarding World	114.54	2001	(Note: Wizarding World franchise: Harry Potter series – ¥96.03 billion; Fantastic Beasts series – ¥18.51 billion)
(Japan) Pokémon	94.08	1998	(Note: Pokémon box office gross revenue: Pokémon: The First Movie (1998) and The Movie 2000 (1999) – ¥14 billion; Pokémon 3 (2000) to Jirachi—Wish Maker (2003) – ¥15.92 billion; Destiny Deoxys (2004) to The Power of Us (2018) – ¥56.15 billion; Pokémon: Detective Pikachu and Mewtwo Strikes Back: Evolution (2019) – ¥5.99 billion; Secrets of the Jungle (2020) – ¥2.02 billion)
(Japan) Demon Slayer: Kimetsu no Yaiba	87.35	2020	(Note: Demon Slayer films: Demon Slayer: Kimetsu no Yaiba – The Movie: Mugen Train (2020) – ¥40.75 billion; Demon Slayer: Kimetsu no Yaiba – To the Swordsmith Village (2023) – ¥4.16 billion; Demon Slayer: Kimetsu no Yaiba – To the Hashira Training (2024) – ¥2.31 billion; Demon Slayer: Kimetsu no Yaiba – The Movie: Infinity Castle (2025) – ¥40.13 billion)
Star Wars	82.28	1978	(Note: Star Wars gross revenue: Star Wars (1978) – ¥6.13 billion; The Empire Strikes Back (1980) and Return of the Jedi (1983) – ¥11.76 billion; The Phantom Menace (1999) to The Force Awakens (2015) – ¥42.85 billion; Rogue One (2016) and Solo: A Star Wars Story (2018) – ¥6.77 billion; The Last Jedi (2017) and The Rise of Skywalker (2019) – ¥14.77 billion)
(Japan) Godzilla (Gojira)	67.84	1954	(Note: Godzilla box office gross revenue: Toho productions – ¥53,060,000,000+; Godzilla (1954) – ¥183 million (rentals); Godzilla Raids Again (1955) and King Kong vs. Godzilla (1962) – ¥600 million (rentals); Mothra vs. Godzilla (1964 & 1970 releases) – ¥547 million (rentals); ¥310 million in 1964. ¥237 million in 1970.; Ghidorah (1964) to Godzilla vs. Hedorah (1971) – ¥2.18 billion (rentals); Godzilla vs. Gigan (1972) – ¥495.11 million (rentals); Godzilla vs. Megalon (1973) to Terror of Mechagodzilla (1975) – ¥920 million (rentals); Mothra vs. Godzilla (1980 re-release) to Godzilla vs. Biollante (1989) – ¥7.3 billion (gross); Godzilla vs. King Ghidorah (1991) – ¥3.19 billion; Godzilla vs. Mothra (1992) to Godzilla vs. Destoroyah (1995) – ¥13.16 billion; Godzilla 2000: Millennium (1999) to Godzilla Against Mechagodzilla (2002) – ¥7.47 billion; Godzilla: Tokyo S.O.S. (2003) to Shin Godzilla (2016) – ¥10.81 billion; Godzilla: Planet of the Monsters (2017) – ¥342,349,800; Godzilla: City on the Edge of Battle (2018) – ¥100,000,000 (opening); Godzilla: The Planet Eater (2018) – ¥171,859,045; Godzilla Minus One (2023) – ¥5.59 billion; Hollywood productions – ¥14.78 billion; Godzilla (1998) – ¥5.1 billion; Godzilla (2014) – ¥3.2 billion; King of the Monsters (2019) – ¥2.84 billion; Godzilla vs. Kong (2021) – ¥1.9 billion; Godzilla x Kong: The New Empire (2024) – ¥1.74 billion)
(Japan) Otoko wa Tsurai yo (Tora-san)	65.32	1969	(Note: Otoko wa Tsurai yo (Tora-san) series: 1970s – ¥12,343,960,000 (rentals); 1980s to 1990s – ¥51.51 billion (gross); Tora-san, Wish You Were Here (2019) – ¥1.47 billion)
Marvel Cinematic Universe (MCU)	62.23	2008	(Note: Marvel Cinematic Universe (MCU) gross revenue: Iron Man, The Incredible Hulk, Thor, Captain America: The First Avenger – ¥2.25 billion; Iron Man 2 – ¥1.2 billion; Marvel's The Avengers (2012) – ¥3.61 billion; Iron Man 3 (2013) – ¥2.57 billion; Guardians of the Galaxy (2014) – ¥1.07 billion; 2015 – ¥4.42 billion; 2016 – ¥2.63 billion; 2017 – ¥6.96 billion; 2018 – ¥6.62 billion; 2019 – ¥11.22 billion; Black Widow and Shang-Chi and the Legend of the Ten Rings (2021) – ¥1,676,843,390; Eternals (2021) – ¥1.2 billion; 2022 – ¥9.01 billion; Guardians of the Galaxy Vol. 3 (2023) - ¥1.32 billion; Ant-Man and the Wasp: Quantumania and The Marvels (2023) - ¥1,437,069,080; Deadpool & Wolverine (2024) - ¥2.11 billion; Captain America: Brave New World (2025) - ¥1.1 billion; Thunderbolts* (2025) - ¥1.1 billion; The Fantastic Four: First Steps (2025) - ¥694.152.300)
(Japan) One Piece	58.61	2000	(Note: See List of One Piece films § Box office performance)
Jurassic Park	56.29	1993	(Note: Jurassic Park gross revenue: Jurassic Park III (2001) – ¥5.13 billion; Jurassic World: Dominion (2022) - ¥6.32 billion; Jurassic World: Rebirth (2025) - ¥4.9 billion; Other films – ¥39.94 billion)
(Japan) Dragon Ball	54.78	1986	(Note: Dragon Ball box office gross revenue: Anime film series – ¥53,932,000,000+; First sixteen films up until Dragon Ball Z: Wrath of the Dragon (1995) – ¥40 billion; Dragon Ball: The Path to Power (1996) – ¥600 million (rentals); Dragon Ball Z: Battle of Gods (2013) – ¥3,042,017,581; Dragon Ball Z: Resurrection 'F' (2015) – ¥3,780,620,150; Dragon Ball Super: Broly (2018) – ¥4 billion; Dragon Ball Super: Super Hero (2022) - ¥2,51 billion; Dragonball Evolution – ¥848,205,249)
(Japan) Disaster trilogy	54.34	2016	(Note: See Disaster trilogy § Box office)
(Japan) Crayon Shin-chan	49.10	1993	
Spider-Man	45.42	1978	(Note: Spider-Man films: Spider-Man (2002) and Spider-Man 3 (2007) – ¥14.6 billion; Spider-Man 2 (2004) – ¥6.7 billion; The Amazing Spider-Man (2012) – ¥3.16 billion; The Amazing Spider-Man 2 (2014) – ¥3.14 billion; Spider-Man: Homecoming (2017) – ¥2.8 billion; Spider-Man: Far From Home (2019) – ¥3.06 billion; Spider-Man: No Way Home (2021) – ¥4.25 billion; Spider-Man: Across the Spiderverse (2023) – ¥1.11 billion; Sony's Spider-Man Universe: Venom (2017) – ¥2.25 billion; Venom: Let There Be Carnage (2021) – ¥1.91 billion; Morbius (2022) - ¥482,642,610; Madame Web (2024) - ¥285.392.910; Venom: The Last Dance (2024) – ¥1.51 billion; Kraven the Hunter (2024) - ¥166.238.060)
Pirates of the Caribbean	43.30	2003	
Mission: Impossible	41.69	1996	(Note: Mission: Impossible: Up until 2006 – ¥15.82 billion; Ghost Protocol (2011) to Mission: Impossible – The Final Reckoning (2025) – ¥25.87 billion)
(Japan) Bayside Shakedown	40.73	1998	
Frozen	38.87	2014	
(Japan) Kamen Rider (Masked Rider)	33.50	1971	(Note: Kamen Rider (仮面ライダー / Masked Rider) films: 2001–2003 – ¥4.18 billion; 2005–2012 – ¥17.51 billion; 2013 – ¥2.42 billion; 2014 – ¥2.02 billion; 2018–2019 – ¥5.03 billion; 2023 – ¥2.34 billion)
Middle-earth	32.05	2002	(Note: Middle-earth franchise: The Lord of the Rings series – ¥27.29 billion; The Hobbit series – ¥4.76 billion)
The Matrix	27.80	1999	(Note: The Matrix series: The Matrix (1999) – ¥8.7 billion; The Matrix: Reloaded and The Matrix: Revolutions (2003) – ¥17.7 billion; The Matrix Resurrections (2021) - ¥1.4 billion)
(Japan) Pretty Cure (Glitter Force)	26.97	2005	
(Japan) Evangelion	25.92	1997	(Note: Evangelion films: Death & Rebirth and The End of Evangelion (1997) – ¥4.34 billion; Rebuild of Evangelion series (2007–2021) – ¥21.58 billion)
Terminator	25.87	1984	(Note: Terminator franchise: The Terminator – ¥520 million; Terminator 2 and Terminator 3 – ¥16.99 billion; Terminator Salvation to Terminator: Dark Fate – ¥8.36 billion)
Despicable Me	25.19	2010	(Note: Despicable Me franchise: Despicable Me series – ¥15.54 billion; Minions series – ¥9.65 billion)
(Japan) Kingdom	24.52	2019	
(Japan) Umizaru	24.42	2004	
Toy Story	24.34	1995	(Note: Toy Story series: Toy Story 2 (2000) – ¥3.45 billion; Toy Story 3 (2010) and Toy Story 4 (2019) – ¥20.89 billion)
(Japan) Gundam	24.31	1981	(Note: Gundam films – ¥24,310,000,000+: Mobile Suit Gundam (1981) – ¥1,760,000,000; Mobile Suit Gundam II: Soldiers of Sorrow (1981) – ¥1,380,000,000; Mobile Suit Gundam III: Encounters in Space (1982) – ¥2,310,000,000; Char's Counterattack (1988) – ¥1,160,000,000; Gundam F91 (1991) – ¥520,000,000; Gundam 0083: The Last Blitz of Zeon (1992) – ¥50,000,000; Z Gundam: A New Translation - Heirs to the Stars (2005) – ¥862,000,000; Z Gundam 2: A New Translation - Lovers (2005) – ¥600,000,000; Z Gundam 3: A New Translation - Love Is the Pulse of the Stars (2006) – ¥492,000,000; Mobile Suit Gundam 00 the Movie: A Wakening of the Trailblazer (2010) – ¥866 million; Mobile Suit Gundam Unicorn 7 (2014) – ¥308 million; The Origin I (2015) – ¥73,726,200; The Origin II (2015) – ¥154,000,000; The Origin III - Dawn of Rebellion (2016) – ¥142,000,000; The Origin IV (2016) – ¥142,000,000; The Origin V (2017) – ¥279,000,000; The Origin VI: Rise of the Red Comet (2018) – ¥227,456,900; Gundam Thunderbolt: December Sky (2016) – ¥71,000,000; Gundam Thunderbolt: Bandit Flower (2017) – ¥83,000,000; Gundam NT (2019) – ¥520 million; Gundam Hathaway (2021) – ¥2.23 billion; Mobile Suit Gundam: Cucuruz Doan's Island (2022) – ¥1.1 billion; Mobile Suit Gundam SEED Freedom (2024) – ¥5.38 billion; Mobile Suit Gundam GQuuuuuuX (2025) – ¥3.60 billion)
Back to the Future	23.79	1985	
Zootopia	23.33	2016	(Note: Zootopia series: Zootopia (2016) – ¥7.63 billion; Zootopia 2 (2025) – ¥15.70 billion)
(Japan) Slam Dunk	23.01	1994	(Note: Slam Dunk films: First three films – ¥6.53 billion; The First Slam Dunk – ¥16.48 billion)
Indiana Jones	22.61	1982	(Note: Indiana Jones series: Raiders of the Lost Ark – ¥1.38 billion; Indiana Jones and the Temple of Doom to Kingdom of the Crystal Skull – ¥18.63 billion; Indiana Jones and the Dial of Destiny – ¥2.6 billion)
Fast & Furious	22.61	2001	(Note: Fast & Furious franchise: Main series – ¥19.55 billion; Hobbs & Shaw (2019) - ¥3.06 billion)
(Japan) Resident Evil (Biohazard)	20.97	2002	(Note: Resident Evil (Biohazard) films: Live-action film series – ¥20,776,229,200; Resident Evil (2002) to Resident Evil: Retribution (2012) – ¥16.277 billion; Resident Evil: The Final Chapter (2016) – ¥4.27 billion; Welcome to Raccoon City (2021) – ¥229,229,200; Animated film series – ¥193 million+; Resident Evil: Degeneration – ¥43 million; Resident Evil: Vendetta – ¥150 million)
Avatar	20.21	2009	(Note: Avatar series: Avatar – ¥15.90 billion; Avatar: The Way of Water – ¥4.31 billion)

=== Box office admissions ===
Film franchise/series	Admissions (est. millions)	Debut year	Ref
(Japan) Doraemon	149.51	1980	
(Japan) Godzilla (Gojira)	120.41	1954	(Note: Godzilla box office admissions: Toho series – 110,237,031; Up until Godzilla: Final Wars (2004) – 99.29 million; Shin Godzilla (2016) – 5.69 million; Godzilla: Planet of the Monsters (2017) opening – 71,200; Godzilla: City on the Edge of Battle and The Planet Eater (2018) openings – 146,000 (73,000 each); Godzilla Minus One (2023) - 5,039,831; Hollywood productions – 10,174,012; Godzilla (1998) – 3.6 million; Godzilla (2014) – 2.18 million; Godzilla: King of the Monsters (2019) – 1.95 million; Godzilla vs. Kong (2021) – 1.27 million; Godzilla x Kong: The New Empire (2024) – 1,174,012)
(Japan) Detective Conan (Case Closed)	118.27	1997	
Wizarding World	90.44	2001	(Note: Wizarding World franchise: Harry Potter series up until Harry Potter and the Order of the Phoenix (2007) – 58.2 million; Harry Potter and the Half-Blood Prince – 6.45 million; Harry Potter and the Deathly Hallows – Part 1 – 5.58 million; Harry Potter and the Deathly Hallows – Part 2 – 6.9 million; Fantastic Beasts and Where to Find Them – 5.24 million; Fantastic Beasts: The Crimes of Grindelwald – 4.92 million; Fantastic Beasts: The Secrets of Dumbledore – 3.15 million)
(Japan) Pokémon	86.27	1998	(Note: Pokémon box office admissions: Pokémon: The First Movie (1998) to I Choose You! (2017) – 77.36 million; Pokémon the Movie: The Power of Us (2018) to Secrets of the Jungle (2020) – 8.91 million (Note: See List of Pokémon films § Box office performance))
(Japan) Otoko wa Tsurai yo (Tora-san)	81.22	1969	(Note: Tora-san box office admissions: Up until Tora-san's Tropical Fever (1997) – 80 million; Tora-san, Wish You Were Here (2019) – 1.22 million)
Star Wars	62.44	1978	(Note: Star Wars box office admissions (est.): Star Wars (1978) – 6.34 million; The Empire Strikes Back (1980) and Return of the Jedi (1983) – 11.17 million; The Phantom Menace (1999) and The Force Awakens (2015) – 15.63 million; Attack of the Clones (2002) – 6.8 million; Revenge of the Sith (2005) – 7.43 million; Rogue One (2016) – 3.08 million; The Last Jedi (2017) – 5.05 million; Solo: A Star Wars Story (2018) – 1.52 billion; The Rise of Skywalker (2019) – 5,422,222)
(Japan) Demon Slayer: Kimetsu no Yaiba	61.74	2020	(Note: Demon Slayer box office admissions: Demon Slayer: Kimetsu no Yaiba – The Movie: Mugen Train (2020) – 29,437,796; Demon Slayer: Kimetsu no Yaiba – To the Swordsmith Village (2023) – 3,240,865; Demon Slayer: Kimetsu no Yaiba – To the Hashira Training (2024) – 1,595,883; Demon Slayer: Kimetsu no Yaiba – The Movie: Infinity Castle (2025) – 27,463,136)
(Japan) Dragon Ball	58.93	1986	(Note: Dragon Ball box office admissions: First sixteen films up until Dragon Ball Z: Wrath of the Dragon (1995) – 50 million; Dragon Ball: The Path to Power (1996) – 1.1 million (est.) (Note: See List of Dragon Ball films § Box office performance); Dragon Ball Z: Battle of Gods (2013) – 2.4 million; Dragon Ball Z: Resurrection 'F' (2015) – 2.36 million; Dragon Ball Super: Broly (2018) – 3.07 million)
(Japan) One Piece	45.06	2000	
Jurassic Park	37.36	1993	(Note: Jurassic Park admissions (est.): 1993 – 8.55 million; 1997 – 7.55 million; 2001 – 4.18 billion; 2015 – 7.31 million; 2017 – 5.53 million; 2022 – 4.24 million)
Pirates of the Caribbean	32.15	2003	(Note: Pirates of the Caribbean admissions: The Curse of the Black Pearl (2003) – 5.43 million (est.); Pirates of the Caribbean: Dead Man's Chest (2006) – 7.8 million; At World's End (2007) – 8.4 million; Pirates of the Caribbean: On Stranger Tides (2011) – 6,000,326; Pirates of the Caribbean: Dead Men Tell No Tales (2017) – 4.52 million)
(Japan) Bayside Shakedown	31.46	1998	(Note: Bayside Shakedown admissions (est.): Bayside Shakedown: The Movie – 7.99 million; Bayside Shakedown 2 – 13 million; Bayside Shakedown 3 – 5.77 million; Bayside Shakedown: The Final – 4.7 million)
Marvel Cinematic Universe (MCU)	30.50	2008	(Note: Marvel Cinematic Universe (MCU) box office admissions (est.): 2008 – 1.19 million; Iron Man 2 (2010) – 950,000; 2011 – 650,000; Marvel's The Avengers (2012) – 2.34 million; Iron Man 3 (2013) – 1.71 million; Guardians of the Galaxy (2014) – 830,000; 2015 – 3.39 million; Captain America: Civil War (2016) – 1.71 million; Doctor Strange and Spider-Man: Homecoming (2017) – 3.15 million; Black Panther and Avengers: Infinity War (2018) – 3.53 million; 2019 – 7.65 million; Shang-Chi and the Legend of the Ten Rings (2021) – 630,000; Spider-Man: No Way Home (2022) – 2.77 million)
Frozen	30.47	2014	
Spider-Man	26.33	1978	(Note: Spider-Man box office admissions: Spider-Man (2002) – 5.14 million; Spider-Man 2 (2004) – 4.75 million; Spider-Man 3 (2007) – 5.17 million; The Amazing Spider-Man (2012) – 2.03 million; The Amazing Spider-Man 2 (2014) – 2.44 million (est.); Spider-Man: Homecoming (2017) – 1.93 million; Spider-Man: Far From Home (2019) – 2.1 million; Spider-Man: No Way Home (2021) – 2.77 million)

== See also ==
- List of highest-grossing Japanese films
- Lists of highest-grossing films
