= List of highest-grossing Japanese films =

Films made in Japan produce revenue through various sources; the lists below only consider box office earnings at cinemas, not other sources of income such as merchandising or home video. The lists include both anime and live-action films produced by Japanese studios, but exclude international co-productions between Japanese and foreign studios. For example, many Hollywood films based on Japanese source material were co-produced with Japanese production companies.

Live-action jidaigeki and war films traditionally dominated the Japanese box office during the 20th century. The earliest film reported to have held the record as the highest-grossing in Japanese cinema is the 1942 wartime propaganda picture The War at Sea from Hawaii to Malaya, which was reportedly seen by 100 million people in Japan and its occupied territories. From 1950 to 1999, figures were usually reported as distributor rentals rather than total gross. Milestones include The Tale of Genji (1951; first over ¥100 million in rentals), Emperor Meiji and the Great Russo-Japanese War (1957; first over ¥500 million), Tokyo Olympiad (1965; first over ¥1 billion), and Mount Hakkoda (1977; first over ¥2 billion).

Worldwide data were limited before the late 1990s. In pure admissions, the 1976 thriller Manhunt remains the highest-grossing Japanese film of all time, having sold an estimated 800 million tickets in China. Antarctica (1983) was the first Japanese film recorded to exceed US$100 million worldwide. Bayside Shakedown 2 (2003) set the record for the highest-grossing Japanese live-action film in U.S. dollars, with US$164 million, though the 2025 epic Kokuho later surpassed it in yen terms in Japan.

Anime rose to box office dominance from the late 20th century. Galaxy Express 999 (1979) was the first to top the annual Japanese chart; since Princess Mononoke (1997), anime films—especially from Studio Ghibli or franchises such as Pokémon and Demon Slayer: Kimetsu no Yaiba—have led both domestic and worldwide rankings. As of 2026, the official record holder for the highest-grossing Japanese film is the 2025 anime feature Demon Slayer: Kimetsu no Yaiba – The Movie: Infinity Castle, with over US$793 million worldwide.

== Highest-grossing films worldwide ==
Due to a lack of available data, some films have incomplete grosses that do not reflect their entire theatrical runs in all markets, and other films are missing altogether. The rankings are consequently only approximate. There is especially a lack of available worldwide box office data for Japanese films released prior to 1997. See Highest-grossing films in Japan below for more complete data within the domestic Japanese market and Box office ticket sales below for more data on both domestic and overseas performance, especially for films released prior to 1997.

The current highest-grossing Japanese film based on recorded box office is Demon Slayer: Kimetsu no Yaiba – The Movie: Infinity Castle with a collection of $793.6 million after re-release in Japan on February 6, 2026 in special IMAX format 1:43:1 and on March 6, 2026 in the United States, Canada, and the United Kingdom in ScreenX format.

The highest-grossing Japanese film in terms of box office ticket sales is the 1976 film Manhunt, which was the first foreign film released in China following the Cultural Revolution, and subsequently was seen by more than 400 million people there, many of whom watching it more than once. According to several retrospective sources, the film attained approximately 800 million admissions in China. Its inflation-adjusted Chinese gross revenue was estimated to be at least CN¥10 billion ($1.48 billion) in 2017 or about $1.94 billion as of 2026. However, the amount of nominal box office gross revenue (not adjusted for inflation) it generated in China at the time is not known to have been reported, so it is not included on this list.

The list also does not include ancillary revenue from other sources such as home entertainment or merchandise sales, where a number of Japanese films earn significantly more revenue. The anime film My Neighbor Totoro (1988), for example, grossed about $1.4 billion from home video and licensed merchandise sales.

† Background shading indicates films playing in the week commencing 20 November 2026 in theaters around the world.

Highest-grossing Japanese films
Title	Worldwide gross	Year	Format	Ref.
Demon Slayer: Kimetsu no Yaiba – The Movie: Infinity Castle	$793,594,078	2025	Anime	
Demon Slayer: Kimetsu no Yaiba – The Movie: Mugen Train	$525,704,063	2020	Anime	
Your Name	$409,225,633	2016	Anime	
Spirited Away	$401,162,582	2001	Anime	
Suzume	$314,992,206	2022	Anime	
The Boy and the Heron	$294,200,000	2023	Anime	(Note: This box office data is outdated. The film was still playing in Japanese cinemas in July 2024.)
The First Slam Dunk	$279,045,965	2022	Anime	
One Piece Film: Red	$246,500,000	2022	Anime	
Howl's Moving Castle	$237,536,126	2004	Anime	
Princess Mononoke	$231,255,044	1997	Anime	
Ponyo	$204,826,668	2008	Anime	
Weathering with You	$197,626,087	2019	Anime	
Chainsaw Man – The Movie: Reze Arc	$191,370,665	2025	Anime	
Jujutsu Kaisen 0	$190,649,039	2021	Anime	
Stand by Me Doraemon	$183,442,714	2014	Anime	
Pokémon: The First Movie	$172,744,662	1998	Anime	
Bayside Shakedown 2	$164,450,000	2003	Live-action	
Detective Conan: One-eyed Flashback	$162,042,074	2025	Anime	
Chiikawa the Movie: The Secret of the Mermaid Island †	$159,000,000	2026	Anime	
Detective Conan: The Million-dollar Pentagram	$150,008,115	2024	Anime	
Arrietty	$149,692,197	2010	Anime	
The Wind Rises	$146,964,251	2013	Anime	
Kokuho	$142,035,063	2025	Live-action	
Pokémon the Movie 2000	$133,949,270	1999	Anime	
Detective Conan: The Fist of Blue Sapphire	$123,009,017	2019	Anime	
Dragon Ball Super: Broly	$122,740,616	2018	Anime	
Detective Conan: Black Iron Submarine	$121,879,597	2023	Anime	
Godzilla Minus One	$116,725,876	2023	Live-action	(Note: Godzilla Minus One's worldwide box office: Original run – $116 million; 2024 North American re-release – $725,876)
Bayside Shakedown	$115,000,000	1998	Live-action	
Godzilla Minus Zero †	$109,659,640	2026	Live-action	
Detective Conan: Zero the Enforcer	$107,918,046	2018	Anime	
The Adventures of Milo and Otis	$104,121,749	1986	Live-action	(Note: $90,822,000 in Japan. $13,299,749 in the United States.)
Detective Conan: The Bride of Halloween	$102,599,093	2022	Anime	
Detective Conan: The Scarlet Bullet	$102,541,282	2021	Anime	
Antarctica	$101,000,000	1983	Live-action	
Haikyu!! The Dumpster Battle	$100,255,784	2024	Anime	
Yo-kai Watch: The Movie	$99,481,307	2014	Anime	
Umizaru 3: The Last Message	$98,663,381	2010	Live-action	
Detective Conan: Fallen Angel of the Highway	$97,567,906	2026	Anime	
Dragon Ball Super: Super Hero	$97,242,192	2022	Anime	
Spy x Family Code: White	$95,792,835	2023	Anime	
One Piece: Stampede	$94,000,000	2019	Anime	
Evangelion: 3.0+1.0 Thrice Upon a Time	$93,882,453	2021	Anime	
Brave Hearts: Umizaru	$91,884,352	2012	Live-action	
Rookies: Graduation	$88,055,243	2009	Live-action	
Nodame Cantabile: The Movie II	$86,192,740	2010	Live-action	
Bayside Shakedown 3	$85,347,374	2010	Live-action	
One Piece Film: Z	$84,936,585	2012	Anime	(Note: One Piece: Film Z's worldwide box office: Japan – ¥6.87 billion (US$82.3 million) (2012); Hong Kong & Taiwan – $1,382,211; Philippines, Singapore, Thailand – $681,794; South Korea – ₩626,891,000 ($572,580))
The Eternal Zero	$84,500,000	2013	Live-action	
Shin Godzilla	$83,320,135	2016	Live-action	(Note: Shin Godzilla's worldwide box office: Original run – $79,277,989; 2025 North American re-release – $4,042,146)

== Highest-grossing films in Japan ==
The following is a list of highest-grossing Japanese films in Japan. (Over ¥10 billion)

Title	Japan gross	Year	Format	Ref.
Demon Slayer: Kimetsu no Yaiba – The Movie: Mugen Train	¥40,750,000,000	2020	Anime	
Demon Slayer: Kimetsu no Yaiba – The Movie: Infinity Castle	¥40,749,000,000	2025	Anime	
Spirited Away	¥31,680,000,000	2001	Anime	
Your Name	¥25,170,000,000	2016	Anime	
Kokuho	¥21,830,000,000	2025	Live-action	
One Piece Film: Red	¥20,340,000,000	2022	Anime	
Princess Mononoke	¥20,180,000,000	1997	Anime	
Howl's Moving Castle	¥19,600,000,000	2004	Anime	
Bayside Shakedown 2	¥17,350,000,000	2003	Live-action	
The First Slam Dunk	¥16,670,000,000	2022	Anime	
Detective Conan: The Million-dollar Pentagram	¥15,800,000,000	2024	Anime	
Ponyo	¥15,500,000,000	2008	Anime	
Suzume	¥14,940,000,000	2022	Anime	
Detective Conan: One-eyed Flashback	¥14,740,000,000	2025	Anime	
Weathering with You	¥14,230,000,000	2019	Anime	
Detective Conan: Black Iron Submarine	¥13,880,000,000	2023	Anime	
Jujutsu Kaisen 0	¥13,800,000,000	2021	Anime	
The Wind Rises	¥12,020,000,000	2013	Anime	
Haikyu!! The Movie: Decisive Battle at the Garbage Dump	¥11,640,000,000	2024	Anime	
Antarctica	¥11,000,000,000	1983	Live-action	
Chainsaw Man – The Movie: Reze Arc	¥10,810,000,000	2025	Anime	
Evangelion: 3.0+1.0 Thrice Upon a Time	¥10,280,000,000	2021	Anime	
Bayside Shakedown	¥10,100,000,000	1998	Live-action	

== Highest-grossing films by year ==
Up until 1999, the Japanese box office was most commonly reported in terms of distributor rentals, which was equivalent to approximately half of the total gross receipts at the Japanese box office. Since 2000, the Japanese box office has been reported in terms of total box office gross receipts. The worldwide gross figures for anime films were also not reported prior to 1997. As such, there are two tables. The first table shows the distributor rentals, gross receipts (if known) and box office admissions in Japan up until 1996, while the second table shows the worldwide gross revenue since 1997.

Highest-grossing Japanese films in Japan by distributor rentals up until 1996
Year	Title	Japanese box office (est.)				Format
Year	Title	Rentals	Gross	Tickets	Ref.	Format
1950	The Munekata Sisters	¥83,780,000	Unknown	Unknown		Live‑action
1951	The Tale of Genji	¥141,050,000	Unknown	Unknown		Live‑action
1952	The Flavor of Green Tea over Rice	¥109,920,000	Unknown	Unknown		Live‑action
1953	Kimi no na wa: Dainibu (What is Your Name? Part 2)	¥300,020,000	Unknown	Unknown		Live‑action
1954	Kimi no na wa: Daisanbu (What is Your Name? Part 3)	¥330,150,000	Unknown	9,690,000		Live‑action
1955	Shuzenji Monogatari (A Tale of Shuzenji)	¥183,680,000	Unknown	8,340,000		Live‑action
1956	Kyofu no Kuchu Satsujin (Air Murder of Fear)	¥192,910,000	Unknown	5,500,000		Live‑action
1957	Emperor Meiji and the Great Russo-Japanese War	¥542,910,000	Unknown	20,000,000		Live‑action
1958	The Loyal 47 Ronin	¥410,330,000	Unknown	11,700,000		Live‑action
1959	The Three Treasures	¥344,320,000	¥600,000,000	9,600,000		Live‑action
1960	Road of Chivalry	¥350,910,000	Unknown	9,000,000		Live‑action
1961	Akō Rōshi	¥435,000,000	Unknown	9,700,000		Live‑action
1962	Sanjuro	¥450,100,000	Unknown	11,200,000+		Live‑action
1963	High and Low	¥460,200,000	Unknown	6,400,000		Live‑action
1964	Ai to Shi o Mitsumete (Gazing at Love and Death)	¥475,000,000	Unknown	6,000,000		Live‑action
1965	Tokyo Olympiad	¥1,250,000,000	¥2,400,000,000	23,500,000		Live‑action
1966	Ebirah, Horror of the Deep	¥330,000,000	Unknown	3,450,000	(Note: A 1972 re-release in Japan sold 760,000 tickets, bringing its all-time total there to roughly 4,210,000.)	Live‑action
1967	Japan's Longest Day	¥419,500,000	Unknown	4,400,000		Live‑action
1968	The Sands of Kurobe	¥796,160,000	Unknown	7,600,000		Live‑action
1969	Samurai Banners	¥720,000,000	Unknown	6,100,000		Live‑action
1970	Men and War: Part I	¥590,000,000	Unknown	4,800,000		Live‑action
1971	Tora-san's Love Call	¥783,280,000	Unknown	5,600,000		Live‑action
1972	Tora-san's Dream-Come-True	¥934,080,000	Unknown	6,100,000		Live‑action
1973	Submersion of Japan	¥1,640,000,000	¥4,000,000,000	8,800,000		Live‑action
1974	The Drifters no Gokuraku wa Dokoda!!	¥1,100,000,000	Unknown	4,600,000		Live‑action
1974	Tora-san's Lullaby	¥1,100,000,000	Unknown	4,600,000		Live‑action
1975	Tora-san, the Intellectual	¥1,191,000,000	Unknown	4,000,000		Live‑action
1976	The Human Revolution Continues	¥1,607,000,000	Unknown	4,800,000		Live‑action
1977	Mount Hakkoda	¥2,509,000,000	Unknown	6,800,000		Live‑action
1978	Never Give Up	¥2,180,000,000	Unknown	5,500,000		Live‑action
1979	Galaxy Express 999	¥1,650,000,000	Unknown	4,400,000		Anime
1980	Kagemusha: The Shadow Warrior	¥2,700,000,000	¥4,590,000,000	4,500,000		Live‑action
1981	Moeru Yūsha (The Blazing Valiant)	¥2,300,000,000	¥3,910,000,000	3,600,000		Live‑action
1981	Sailor Suit and Machine Gun	¥2,300,000,000	¥3,910,000,000	3,600,000		Live‑action
1982	High Teen Boogie	¥1,800,000,000	¥3,060,000,000	2,800,000		Live‑action
1983	Antarctica	¥5,900,000,000	¥11,000,000,000	12,000,000		Live‑action
1984	Main Theme	¥1,850,000,000	¥3,150,000,000	3,200,000		Live‑action
1984	Aijō Monogatari (Curtain Call)	¥1,850,000,000	¥3,150,000,000	3,200,000		Live‑action
1985	The Burmese Harp	¥2,950,000,000	¥5,900,000,000	5,300,000		Live‑action
1986	The Adventures of Milo and Otis	¥5,400,000,000	¥9,800,000,000	7,500,000		Live‑action
1987	Hachikō Monogatari	¥2,000,000,000	¥3,400,000,000	3,000,000		Live‑action
1988	The Silk Road	¥4,500,000,000	¥8,200,000,000	7,300,000		Live‑action
1989	Kiki's Delivery Service	¥2,170,000,000	¥4,300,000,000	2,640,619		Anime
1990	Heaven and Earth	¥5,050,000,000	¥9,200,000,000	7,800,000		Live‑action
1991	Only Yesterday	¥1,870,000,000	¥3,180,000,000	2,200,000		Anime
1992	Porco Rosso	¥2,800,000,000	¥5,400,000,000	3,100,000		Anime
1993	Rex: A Dinosaur's Story	¥2,200,000,000	¥3,740,000,000	3,000,000		Live‑action
1994	Pom Poko	¥2,650,000,000	¥4,470,000,000	3,300,000		Anime
1995	Godzilla vs. Destoroyah	¥2,000,000,000	¥3,500,000,000	4,000,000		Live‑action
1996	Shall We Dance?	¥1,600,000,000	¥2,720,000,000	2,200,000		Live‑action
1996	Doraemon: Nobita and the Galaxy Super-express	¥1,600,000,000	¥2,720,000,000	2,200,000		Anime
1996	Haunted School 2	¥1,600,000,000	¥2,720,000,000	2,200,000		Live‑action

Worldwide box office data prior to 1997 is sparse, thus the table for worldwide gross figures begins in that year. Movies that have been re-released are listed by their total gross, with their original gross noted in parentheses.

† Background shading indicates films playing in the week commencing 20 November 2026 in theaters around the world.

Highest-grossing Japanese films by worldwide revenue since 1997
Year	Title	Worldwide gross	Format	Ref.
1997	Princess Mononoke	$169,785,704	Anime	
1998	Pokémon: The First Movie	$172,744,662	Anime	
1999	Pokémon: The Movie 2000	$133,949,270	Anime	
2000	Pokémon 3: The Movie	$68,411,275	Anime	
2001	Spirited Away	$395,580,000 ($274,925,095)	Anime	
2002	The Cat Returns	$65,000,000	Anime	
2003	Bayside Shakedown 2	$164,450,000	Live-action	
2004	Howl's Moving Castle	$236,214,446	Anime	
2005	Yamato	$39,287,114	Live-action	
2006	Tales from Earthsea	$75,500,000	Anime	
2007	Hero	$80,400,000	Live-action	
2008	Ponyo	$204,826,668	Anime	
2009	Rookies: Graduation	$88,055,243	Live-action	
2010	Arrietty	$149,411,550	Anime	
2011	From Up on Poppy Hill	$61,487,846	Anime	
2012	Brave Hearts: Umizaru	$91,884,352	Live-action	
2013	The Wind Rises	$136,533,257	Anime	
2014	Stand by Me Doraemon	$183,442,714	Anime	
2015	Dragon Ball Z: Resurrection 'F'	$61,768,190	Anime	
2016	Your Name	$382,238,181 ($358,331,458)	Anime	
2017	Detective Conan: The Crimson Love Letter	$63,147,576	Anime	
2018	Dragon Ball Super: Broly	$122,740,616	Anime	
2019	Weathering with You	$193,715,360	Anime	
2020	Demon Slayer: Kimetsu no Yaiba – The Movie: Mugen Train	$512,704,063	Anime	
2021	Jujutsu Kaisen 0	$196,200,000	Anime	
2022	Suzume	$313,637,054	Anime	
2023	The Boy and the Heron	$294,200,000	Anime	
2024	Detective Conan: The Million-dollar Pentagram	$150,008,115	Anime	
2025	Demon Slayer: Kimetsu no Yaiba – The Movie: Infinity Castle	$793,594,078	Anime	
2026	Chiikawa the Movie: The Secret of the Mermaid Island †	$159,000,000	Anime	

== Box office ticket sales ==
The following table lists known estimated box office ticket sales for various high-grossing Japanese films that have sold more than 10 million tickets worldwide.

Note that some of the data are incomplete due to a lack of available admissions data from a number of countries. Therefore, it is not an exhaustive list of all the highest-grossing Japanese films by ticket sales, so no rankings are given.

Title	Year	Box office ticket sales (est.)			Ref.	Format
Title	Year	Japan	Overseas	Worldwide	Ref.	Format
Manhunt	1976	720,000	833,700,000	834,420,000	(Note: Manhunt (Kimi yo Fundo no Kawa o Watare) admissions: Japan – 720,000; China – 800,000,000; Soviet Union – 33,700,000)	Live‑action
The Glacier Fox	1978	2,300,000	101,400,000+	103,700,000+	(Note: The Glacier Fox admissions: Japan – 2,300,000; China – 100,000,000+; United States – 1,400,000)	Live‑action
Sandakan No. 8	1974	Unknown	100,000,000+	100,000,000+		Live‑action
The War at Sea from Hawaii to Malaya	1942	100,000,000 (Note: Including Japan's then-occupied territories.)				Live‑action
Demon Slayer: Kimetsu no Yaiba – The Movie: Infinity Castle	2025	27,485,517	71,180,310	98,665,827		Anime
Demon Slayer: Kimetsu no Yaiba – The Movie: Mugen Train	2020	29,437,796	28,162,204	57,600,000		Anime
Legend of Dinosaurs & Monster Birds	1977	700,000	48,700,000	49,400,000		Live‑action
Spirited Away	2001	24,280,000	23,001,643	47,281,643	(Note: Spirited Away admissions: Japan – 24,280,000; China – 15,546,100; Europe – 3,570,387; United States – 2,400,000; South Korea (Seoul City) – 937,459; Brazil and Argentina – 477,697; Taiwan – 70,000)	Anime
Suzume	2022	10,945,784	31,656,888	47,000,000	(Note: Suzume admissions: Japan – 10,945,784; China – 23,856,400; South Korea – 5,139,145; United States and United Kingdom – 1,207,342; Taiwan – 900,000; France and Spain – 379,185; Germany – 174,816)	Anime
Your Name	2016	19,300,000	25,878,383	45,178,383	(Note: Your Name admissions: Japan – 19,300,000; China – 20,728,000; South Korea – 3,712,891; Europe (excluding Russia and Spain) – 627,384; United States and Canada – 580,000; Russia and Argentina – 169,600; Spain – 60,508)	Anime
Pokémon: The First Movie	1998	6,650,000	30,187,706	36,837,706	(Note: Pokémon: The First Movie admissions: Japan – 6,650,000; United States and Canada – 16,858,300; Europe – 12,679,046; Brazil – 468,000; South Korea (Seoul City) – 182,360)	Anime
The First Slam Dunk	2022	9,220,517	21,848,507	31,069,024	(Note: The First Slam Dunk admissions: Japan – 9,220,517; China – 15,491,500; South Korea – 4,597,007; Taiwan – 1,760,000)	Anime
Weathering with You	2019	10,510,000	19,290,000	29,800,000		Anime
Tora! Tora! Tora!	1970	3,500,000	24,965,509	28,465,509		Live‑action
Koi no Kisetsu	1969	Unknown	27,600,000	27,600,000+		Live‑action
The Bullet Train	1975	1,000,000	25,440,638	26,440,638	(Note: The Bullet Train admissions: Japan – 1,000,000; France – 440,638; Soviet Union – 25,000,000+)	Live‑action
One Piece Film: Red	2022	14,740,000	10,542,073	25,282,073	(Note: One Piece Film: Red admissions: Japan – 14,740,000; China – 6,048,959; 2022 – 5,601,960; 2023 – 446,999; Europe – 1,883,102; France and Italy – 1,108,614; Germany – 302,424; Other European countries – 472,064; United States – 1,400,000; Taiwan – 660,000; Brazil – 346,968; South Korea – 203,044)	Anime
Tokyo Olympiad	1965	23,500,000	993,555	24,493,555		Live‑action
The Ballad of Narayama	1983	1,600,000	21,945,197	23,500,000	(Note: The Ballad of Narayama admissions: Japan – 1,600,000; Soviet Union – 21,100,000; France – 844,077; Netherlands – 1,120)	Live‑action
Stand by Me Doraemon	2014	6,250,000	16,833,251	23,083,251	(Note: Stand by Me Doraemon admissions: Japan – 6,250,000; China – 15,296,400; Europe – 754,321; South Korea – 504,153; Spain – 278,377)	Anime
Detective Conan: One-eyed Flashback	2025	10,130,578	11,986,917	22,117,495	(Note: See List of Detective Conan films § Box office performance)	Anime
Howl's Moving Castle	2004	15,500,000	6,443,336	21,943,336	(Note: Howl's Moving Castle admissions: Japan – 15,500,000; South Korea – 3.02 million; France and Germany – 1,741,585; United States and Canada – 831,000; Europe (excluding France and Germany) – 764,445; Brazil – 86,306)	Anime
Dersu Uzala	1975	Unknown	21,475,653	21,475,653+	(Note: Dersu Uzala: Soviet Union and Sweden – 20,432,400; France – 994,988; Other EU territories (since 1996) – 48,265)	Live‑action
Detective Conan: The Million-dollar Pentagram	2024	11,006,971	9,259,547	20,266,518		Anime
Emperor Meiji and the Great Russo-Japanese War	1957	20,000,000	Unknown	20,000,000+		Live‑action
Pokémon: The Movie 2000	1999	5,600,000	13,968,660	19,568,660	(Note: Pokemon: The Movie 2000 admissions: Japan – 5,600,000; United States and Canada – 8,184,000; Europe (excluding France) – 5,034,378; France – 730,002; South Korea (Seoul City) – 20,280)	Anime
Dragon Ball Super: Broly	2018	3,070,000	15,530,000	18,600,000	(Note: Dragon Ball Super: Broly admissions: Japan – 3,070,000; Latin America – 8,420,410+; Mexico – 4,100,000; Peru – 1,122,971; Argentina – 808,055; Colombia (4 days) – 539,874; Chile (4 days) – 362,776; Brazil – 1,301,048; Bolivia (1 week) – 91,968; Paraguay – 77,713; Uruguay (4 days) – 11,059; United States and Canada – 3,408,700; Europe – 1,518,016; France and Germany – 638,407; Other European countries – 879,609; China – 1,034,444; South Korea – 35,869)	Anime
Ponyo	2008	12,900,000	5,202,354	18,102,354	(Note: Ponyo admissions: Japan – 12,900,000; United States and Canada – 2,094,000; South Korea – 1,521,842; France and Germany – 1,019,425; Europe (excl. France, Germany, Russia) – 514,690; Russia and Brazil – 52,397)	Anime
Princess Mononoke	1997	15,551,994	2,221,334	17,773,328	(Note: Princess Mononoke admissions: Japan – 15,551,994; Europe (excluding Russia) – 1,370,868; United States and Canada – 628,800; South Korea – 195,630; Russia – 26,036)	Anime
Shin Godzilla	2016	5,690,000	10,410,000	16,100,000		Anime
Detective Conan: Black Iron Submarine	2023	9,779,013	6,220,821	15,999,834		Anime
Detective Conan: The Fist of Blue Sapphire	2019	7,260,000	8,144,614	15,404,614		Anime
Kokuho	2025	14,756,449	Unknown	14,756,449+		Live‑action
Detective Conan: The Bride of Halloween	2022	7,020,000	7,096,214	14,116,214		Anime
Jujutsu Kaisen 0	2021	9,840,000	4,371,597	13,875,926	(Note: Jujutsu Kaisen 0: Japan – 9,840,000; United States – 3,168,000; France and Germany – 631,330; South Korea – 572,267)	Anime
One Piece Film: Gold	2016	3,870,000	9,430,000	13,300,000		Anime
Bayside Shakedown 2	2003	12,600,000	151,823	12,751,823		Live‑action
King Kong vs. Godzilla	1962	12,600,000	Unknown	Unknown		Live‑action
Antarctica	1983	12,000,000	543,470	12,543,470		Live‑action
Detective Conan: The Scarlet Bullet	2021	5,480,000	6,960,866	12,440,866		Anime
The Secret World of Arrietty	2012	7,560,000	4,865,830	12,425,830	(Note: The Secret World of Arrietty admissions: Japan – 7,560,000; United States and Canada – 2,432,000; South Korea – 1,083,746; France – 934,073; Other European territories – 416,011)	Anime
The Adventures of Milo and Otis	1986	7,500,000	4,518,750	12,018,750	(Note: The Adventures of Milo and Otis admissions: Japan – 7,500,000; United States – 3,200,000; Germany and France – 1,318,750)	Live‑action
Doraemon: Nobita's Treasure Island	2018	4,680,000	7,214,020	11,894,020	(Note: Doraemon: Nobita's Treasure Island admissions: Japan – 4,680,000; China – 7,030,800; South Korea – 183,220)	Anime
Detective Conan: Zero the Enforcer	2018	6,880,000	5,002,375	11,882,375		Anime
The Wind Rises	2013	9,720,000	2,131,749	11,851,749	(Note: The Wind Rises admissions: Japan – 9,720,000; Russia – 127,400; Europe (excluding Russia and Spain) – 1,186,384; United States and Canada – 652,200; South Korea – 106,439; Spain – 59,326)	Anime
The Loyal 47 Ronin	1958	11,700,000	—	11,700,000		Live‑action
Godzilla Minus One	2023	5,039,831	6,460,169	11,500,000		Live‑action
Seven Samurai	1954	9,690,000	1,793,096	11,483,096	(Note: Seven Samurai admissions: Japan – 9,690,000+; United States and United Kingdom – 1,346,713; Spain – 354,600; Other European countries (1996–2025) – 89,609; South Korea (2004) – 2,174)	Live‑action
Sanjuro	1962	11,200,000	12,066	11,212,066		Live‑action
Stand by Me Doraemon 2	2020	2,260,000	8,350,611	10,610,611	(Note: Stand by Me Doraemon 2: Japan – 2,260,000; China – 8,268,300; South Korea – 82,311)	Anime
Godzilla	1954	9,690,000	841,214+	10,531,214+		Live‑action
One Piece: Stampede	2019	3,700,000	6,701,192	10,401,192	(Note: One Piece: Stampede: Japan – 3,700,000; China – 6,678,800; South Korea – 22,392)	Anime
Pokémon 3: The Movie	2001	4,500,000	5,614,749	10,114,749	(Note: Pokémon 3 admissions: Japan – 4,500,000; United States and Canada – 3,055,000; Europe (excluding France) – 1,861,273; Brazil – 538,075; France – 160,401)	Anime

== See also ==
- List of highest-grossing films in Japan
- List of highest-grossing animated films
