= Toshio Kakei =

Japanese actor (born 1962)

- Born: Kakei Toshio; August 10, 1962 (age 63); Hamamatsu, Japan
- Occupation: Actor
- Years active: 1982-present

Toshio Kakei (筧 利夫) (born 10 August 1962 in Hamamatsu, Shizuoka) is a Japanese actor. He had major roles in several TV drama series such as Bayside Shakedown.

Kakei graduated from Osaka University of Arts.

== Filmography ==
=== Television ===
- Bayside Shakedown (1998, Fuji TV) as Kentaro Shinjo
- Dr. Coto's Clinic (2003–06, Fuji TV) as Kazunori Wada
- Ryōmaden (2010, NHK) as Miyoshi Shinzō
- Naotora: The Lady Warlord (2017, NHK) as Nakao Naoyoshi

=== Film ===
- Bayside Shakedown (1998) as Kentaro Shinjo
- Bayside Shakedown 2 (2003) as Kentaro Shinjo
- The Suspect (2005) as Kentaro Shinjo
- Bayside Shakedown: The Final (2012) as Kentaro Shinjo
- The Next Generation -Patlabor- (2014, 2015) as Captain Keiji Gotōda
- Blood Friends (2019)
- Fullmetal Alchemist: The Revenge of Scar (2022) as Fu
- Fullmetal Alchemist: The Final Alchemy (2022) as Fu
- Dr. Coto's Clinic 2022 (2022) as Kazunori Wada
- Ginji the Speculator (2022)
- Shinji Muroi: Not Defeated (2024) as Kentaro Shinjo
- Shinji Muroi: Stay Alive (2024) as Kentaro Shinjo

=== Theater ===
- Miss Saigon (2004, 2008, 2014) as Engineer
