= List of 2012 box office number-one films in Japan =

This is a list of films which placed number one at the weekend box office for the year 2012 in Japan.

== Number-one films ==
†	This implies the highest-grossing movie of the year.

#	Date	Film	Gross
1	January 8, 2012	Mission: Impossible – Ghost Protocol	$4,314,616
2	January 15, 2012	Mission: Impossible – Ghost Protocol	$2,643,113
3	January 22, 2012	Always: Sunset on Third Street '64	$7,212,260
4	January 29, 2012	Always: Sunset on Third Street '64	$5,298,327
5	February 5, 2012	Always: Sunset on Third Street '64	$3,560,747
6	February 12, 2012	The Girl with the Dragon Tattoo	$3,030,087
7	February 19, 2012	In Time	$3,636,881
8	February 26, 2012	In Time	$3,119,080
9	March 4, 2012	Doraemon: Nobita and the Island of Miracles—Animal Adventure	$6,812,341
10	March 11, 2012	Doraemon: Nobita and the Island of Miracles—Animal Adventure	$5,305,991
11	March 18, 2012	Doraemon: Nobita and the Island of Miracles—Animal Adventure	$3,660,556
12	March 25, 2012	Doraemon: Nobita and the Island of Miracles—Animal Adventure	$3,027,582
13	April 1, 2012	Doraemon: Nobita and the Island of Miracles—Animal Adventure	$3,678,829
14	April 8, 2012	SPEC: Ten	$5,710,349
15	April 15, 2012	Detective Conan: The Eleventh Striker	$7,672,280
16	April 22, 2012	Kamen Rider × Super Sentai: Super Hero Taisen	$4,995,597
17	April 29, 2012	Terumae romae	$5,269,888
18	May 6, 2012	Terumae romae	$6,835,550
19	May 13, 2012	Terumae romae	$4,541,769
20	May 20, 2012	Dark Shadows	$5,050,897
21	May 27, 2012	Men in Black 3	$7,161,565
22	June 3, 2012	Men in Black 3	$5,248,314
23	June 10, 2012	Men in Black 3	$4,037,744
24	June 17, 2012	Snow White and the Huntsman	$3,867,922
25	June 24, 2012	Snow White and the Huntsman	$2,538,108
26	July 1, 2012	The Amazing Spider-Man	$7,445,379
27	July 8, 2012	The Amazing Spider-Man	$4,545,555
28	July 15, 2012	Brave Hearts: Umizaru †	$11,045,479
29	July 22, 2012	Brave Hearts: Umizaru †	$6,975,357
30	July 29, 2012	Brave Hearts: Umizaru †	$5,209,789
31	August 5, 2012	Brave Hearts: Umizaru †	$3,748,421
32	August 12, 2012	Brave Hearts: Umizaru †	$3,456,137
33	August 19, 2012	The Avengers	$6,386,185
34	August 26, 2012	Rurouni Kenshin	$5,093,453
35	September 2, 2012	Rurouni Kenshin	$5,186,091
36	September 9, 2012	Bayside Shakedown: The Final	$10,276,902
37	September 16, 2012	Resident Evil: Retribution	$8,650,515
38	September 23, 2012	Resident Evil: Retribution	$6,326,277
39	September 30, 2012	Bayside Shakedown: The Final	$3,464,776
40	October 7, 2012	Beyond Outrage	$3,580,556
41	October 14, 2012	Puella Magi Madoka Magica: The Movie "Eternal"	¥171,622,400
42	October 21, 2012	The Expendables 2	$2,112,912
43	October 28, 2012	Smile Precure! Ehon No Naka Ha Mina Chiguhagu	$2,472,021
44	November 4, 2012	The Floating Castle	$5,055,822
45	November 11, 2012	The Floating Castle	$3,823,135
46	November 18, 2012	Evangelion: 3.0 You Can (Not) Redo	$14,147,695
47	November 25, 2012	Evangelion: 3.0 You Can (Not) Redo	$6,966,858
48	December 2, 2012	Skyfall	$5,675,774
49	December 9, 2012	Kamen Rider × Kamen Rider Wizard & Fourze: Movie War Ultimatum	$3,424,137
50	December 16, 2012	One Piece Film: Z	$16,681,502
51	December 23, 2012	One Piece Film: Z	$8,553,633
52	December 30, 2012	One Piece Film: Z	$5,439,671

== Highest-grossing films ==
International film Japanese film

Highest-grossing films of 2012
Rank	Title	Gross
1	Brave Hearts: Umizaru	¥7.33 billion ($91.87 million)
2	Thermae Romae	¥5.98 billion ($74.95 million)
3	Bayside Shakedown: The Final	¥5.97 billion ($74.82 million)
4	Mission: Impossible – Ghost Protocol	¥5.38 billion ($67.43 million)
5	Evangelion: 3.0 You Can (Not) Redo	¥5.30 billion ($66.42 million)
6	Wolf Children	¥4.22 billion ($52.89 million)
7	Resident Evil: Retribution	¥3.81 billion ($47.75 million)
8	Doraemon: Nobita and the Island of Miracles—Animal Adventure	¥3.62 billion ($45.37 million)
9	The Avengers	¥3.61 billion ($45.24 million)
9	Pokémon the Movie: Kyurem vs. the Sword of Justice	¥3.61 billion ($45.24 million)

== See also ==
- List of Japanese films of 2012
- List of American films — American films by year
