= Miki Mizuno =

Japanese actress (born 1974)

- 水野 美紀
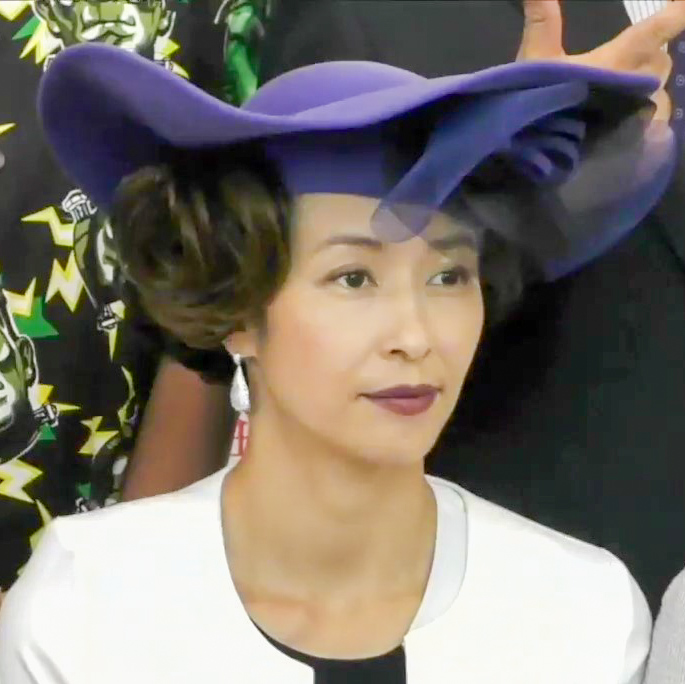
- 2019
- Born: 28 June 1974 (age 52); Yokkaichi, Mie Prefecture, Japan
- Occupation: Actress
- Years active: 1990-present
- Agent: Office More
- Known for: Bayside Shakedown; Gamera 2: Attack of Legion
- Spouse: Mitsuru Karahashi (m. 2016)
- Children: 1
- Website: www.mikimizuno.com

Miki Mizuno (水野 美紀, Mizuno Miki; born 28 June 1974) is a Japanese actress. She played the role of villain in the horror film Carved as the Kuchisake-Onna a malevolent vengeful spirit who killed many children.

== Career ==
Mizuno starred in Takanori Tsujimoto's action films Hard Revenge Milly and Hard Revenge Milly: Bloody Battle. She also starred in Sion Sono's 2011 film Guilty of Romance.

== Filmography ==
=== Film ===
- Kunoichi Ninpocho (1991)
- Honban Joyu (1992)
- Kunoichi Ninpocho 2: Sei Shojo no Hiho (1992)
- Sadistic Mariya (1992)
- Shura no Jakushi: Narumi 2 (1993)
- Nekketsu Golf Club (1994)
- Raiden (1994)
- Shoot (1994)
- Daishitsuren (1995)
- Gamera 2: Attack of Legion (1996), Midori Honami
- Bayside Shakedown: The Movie (1998), Yukino Kashiwagi
- Genjitsu no Tsuzuki Yume no Owari (1999)
- Senrigan (2000)
- Bayside Shakedown 2 (2003), Yukino Kashiwagi
- My Lover Is a Sniper (2004)
- Negotiator (2005), Yukino Kashiwagi
- Zukan ni Nottenai Mushi (2007)
- Carved (2007)
- Wenny Has Wings (2008)
- Sasori: Prisoner 701 (2008)
- Hard Revenge Milly (2008)
- Hard Revenge Milly: Bloody Battle (2009)
- Castle Under Fiery Skies (2009)
- Waya! Uchuu Ichi no Osekkai Daisakusen (2011)
- Guilty of Romance (2011)
- Dead Mine (2012)
- Bayside Shakedown: The Final (2012), Yukino Mashita
- I'll Give It My All... Tomorrow (2013)
- Sweet Bean (2015)
- The Brightest Roof in the Universe (2020)
- To Every You I've Loved Before (2022), Shiori's mother (voice)
- To Me, the One Who Loved You (2022), Shiori's mother (voice)
- Bayside Shakedown: N.E.W (2026), Yukino Mashita

=== Television ===
- Itoko Doshi (1992)
- Yume Miru Koro o Sugitemo (1994)
- Koibito yo (1995)
- Natural Ai no Yukue (1996)
- Tsubasa o Kudasai! (1996)
- Age 35 Koishikute (1996)
- Best Partner (1997)
- Shokuinshitsu (1997)
- Bayside Shakedown (1997), Yukino Kashiwagi
- Hotel (1998)
- Team (1999)
- Kanojotachi no Jidai (1999)
- Salaryman Kintaro (1999)
- Oyaji (2000)
- Hanamura Daisuke (2000)
- Beautiful Life (2000)
- Koi ga Shitai x3 (2001)
- Joshiana (2001)
- Shiawase no Shippo (2002)
- Hatsutaiken (2002)
- Koibumi (2003)
- Okaasan to Issho (2003)
- Tobosha (2004)
- Dream (2004)
- Slow Start (2007)
- Galileo (2007)
- Hakui no Namida (2013)
- The Flying PR Room (2013)
- Jiken Kyūmeii: Imat no Kiseki (2013)
- Umi no Ue no Shinryōjo Episode 10 (2013)
- Team Bachisuta 4 (2014)
- Jiken Kyūmeii2: Imat no Kiseki (2014)
- Kazoku Gari (2014)
- Masshiro (2015)
- I'm Home (2015)
- 37.5°C Tears (2015)
- Love Song (2016)
- Scarlet (2019–20)
- The Way of the Househusband (2020)
- Unbound (2025), Ine
- The Scent of the Wind (2026), Mitsu Ichinose
