= Reunion (2012 film) =

- Directed by: Ryoichi Kimizuka
- Based on: Itai: Shinsai, Tsunami no Hate ni by Kota Ishii
- Produced by: Chihiro Kameyama
- Starring: Toshiyuki Nishida; Koichi Sato; Toshirō Yanagiba
- Music by: Takatsugu Muramatsu
- Release dates: 2 September 2012 (Montréal Festival des Films du Monde); 23 February 2013 (Japan)
- Running time: 105 minutes
- Country: Japan
- Language: Japanese

Reunion (遺体 明日への十日間, Itai: Asu e no Tōkakan) is a Japanese film directed by Ryoichi Kimizuka, starring Toshiyuki Nishida. It premiered at the Montreal World Film Festival in September 2012, and was released at cinemas in Japan on 23 February 2013.

== Outline ==
The film is based on the non-fiction book Itai: Shinsai, Tsunami no Hate ni (遺体―震災、津波の果てに; "The Bodies at the End of the Earthquake and Tsunami") by Kota Ishii. Set in Kamaishi, Iwate, following the 2011 Tōhoku earthquake and tsunami, a retired funeral-home employee volunteers to assist in the task of preparing bodies at a temporary morgue set up in a school gymnasium.

== Cast ==
- Toshiyuki Nishida as Aiba
- Koichi Sato as a doctor
- Toshirō Yanagiba as a dentist
- Ryo Katsuji
- Jun Kunimura
- Naoto Ogata
- Wakana Sakai
- Shiro Sano
- Ikki Sawamura
- Mirai Shida
- Michitaka Tsutsui

== Music ==
The film's music was composed and arranged by Takatsugu Muramatsu. The ending theme song, "Pray for the World", was sung by Japanese singer Shanti Snyder.

== Release ==
=== Theatrical run ===
The film premiered at the Montreal World Film Festival in September 2012, and was released at cinemas in Japan on 23 February 2013.
