= Yūsuke Santamaria =

Japanese actor and singer

- Born: Yūsuke Nakayama; 12 March 1971 (age 55); Ōita, Ōita, Japan
- Occupations: Actor, singer
- Years active: 1994–present

Yūsuke Nakayama (中山 裕介, Nakayama Yūsuke; born 12 March 1971), better known by his stage name Yūsuke Santamaria (ユースケ・サンタマリア), is a Japanese actor and singer.

== Biography ==
Santamaria appeared in Kiyoshi Kurosawa's 2003 film Doppelganger. He starred in Katsuyuki Motohiro's 2005 film Negotiator. He directed and starred a segment of the 2008 anthology film R246 Story. He also appeared in Kiyoshi Sasabe's 2011 film The Legacy of the Sun.

== Filmography ==
=== Film ===
Year	Film	Role	Notes	Ref(s)
1998	Bayside Shakedown: The Movie	Masayoshi Mashita		
2001	Calmi Cuori Appassionati	Takashi		
2003	Bayside Shakedown 2	Masayoshi Mashita		
2003	Doppelganger			
2005	Negotiator	Masayoshi Mashita	Lead role	
2006	The Sakai's Happiness			
2006	Udon		Lead role	
2007	Kisaragi	Yūji Oda		
2008	R246 Story			
2009	20th Century Boys 2: The Last Hope	Kiyoshi "Sadakiyo" Sada		
2009	Shonen Merikensack			
2009	Donju			
2009	Go Find a Psychic!			
2010	Bayside Shakedown 3	Masayoshi Mashita		
2011	The Legacy of the Sun			
2012	Bayside Shakedown 4: The Final	Masayoshi Mashita		
2012	Crow's Thumb			
2013	Dawn of a Filmmaker: The Keisuke Kinoshita Story			
2014	Our Family			
2014	The Vancouver Asahi			
2014	Giovanni's Island	Hideo (voice)		
2015	April Fools			
2016	Gold Medal Man			
2016	Birthday Card			
2017	Wilderness: Part One	Horiguchi		
2017	Wilderness: Part Two	Horiguchi		
2017	The Stand-In Thief			
2018	Eating Women	Tanabe		
2019	Blue Hour			
2019	One Piece: Stampede	Buena Festa (voice)		
2022	Akira and Akira			
2023	The Silent Service	Eiichi Nanba		
2024	Living in Two Worlds	Akito Imai		
2025	Strawberry Moon	Kosuke Sakurai		
2026	The Samurai and the Prisoner	Akioka Shironosuke		
2026	Your Own Quiz	Shunsaku Katagiri		
2026	Bayside Shakedown: N.E.W	Masayoshi Mashita		

=== Television ===
Year	Title	Role	Notes	Ref(s)
1997	Bayside Shakedown	Masayoshi Mashita		
1998	Nemureru Mori			
1999	Perfect Love			
2000	Omiai Kekkon	Kotaro Hirose	Lead role	
2001	Rocket Boy			
2012	¥20,000,000 Quiz! Money Drop	The host	Game show	
2016	The Sparks	Shingo Takeuchi	Lead role	
2016	Cold Case			
2018	Auditor Shuhei Nozaki			
2019	I Will Not Work Overtime, Period!	Seiji Fukunaga		
2020	Awaiting Kirin	Asakura Yoshikage	Taiga drama	
2022	The Journalist	Shinjirō Toyoda		
2022	Modern Love Tokyo	Yōji Suzuki		
2024	Dear Radiance	Abe no Haruakira	Taiga drama	
2024–27	The Silent Service	Eiichi Nanba	2 seasons	
2025	Scandal Eve	Seigo Hashimoto		
