= Taiyo to Umi no Kyoshitsu =

2008 Japanese television series

- Publicity poster
- Also known as: Homeroom by the Beachside
- Genre: Coming-of-age, School drama
- Written by: Yuji Sakamoto
- Directed by: Setsuro Wakamatsu, Masaki Tanimura, Yoshinori Muratani, Kozo Nagayama
- Starring: Yūji Oda
- Theme music composer: Takayuki Hattori
- Ending theme: Kimi no Hitomi ni Koishiteiru by UZ
- Country of origin: Japan
- Original language: Japanese
- No. of seasons: 1
- No. of episodes: 10

Production
- Producer: Ken Murase
- Camera setup: Multi-camera
- Running time: 54 minutes Ep. 1: 30-minute extension Ep. 10: 15-minute extension
- Production company: Fuji TV

Original release
- Network: Fuji TV
- Release: July 21 – September 22, 2008

Taiyo to Umi no Kyoshitsu (太陽と海の教室, Taiyō to Umi no Kyōshitsu; also known as Homeroom by the Beachside) is a Japanese television series which premiered on Fuji TV on July 21, 2008. The series starred Yūji Oda as Sakutaro Sakurai, the homeroom teacher of Third Year's Class 1 (class 3-1).

The television series was broadcast as part of the Fuji TV's Getsuku time slot, which airs every Monday from 9pm to 9:54pm. The drama had an average viewership of 14.8% throughout its run.

== Plot ==
At a particular private senior high school in Shōnan, Kanagawa Prefecture, 3rd year students are preparing for their university entrance examinations. Sakutaro is brought into the school by the principal in anticipation of the fallout from a scandal involving the school. However, his unorthodox methods of teaching and his emphasis on values is met with stiff resistance from his students, who are only interested in improving their academic results. His unorthodox approach also creates friction between him and the rest of the staff.

After helping his students with their various difficulties and imparting values to them in the process, Sakutaro's students begin to respect him as a teacher. The students also begin to realise the importance of pursuing their dreams rather than blindly following a successful path set by society. Together, the class grow as people and are able to tackle the many challenges that they faced. Sensing the growth of the students, the other members of the staff begin to question their previous fixation on grades and instead support Sakutaro's teaching methods.

== Cast ==
- Yūji Oda as Sakutaro Sakurai (織田裕二; 39)

The homeroom teacher of class 3-1 and a Japanese language teacher. He is an economics graduate from Tokyo University, and obtained an MBA from Stanford University when he was just 24 years old. When he was on a job assignment in Africa, he was so moved by a native boy's desire to learn that he changed profession to become a teacher. He was invited by principal Kyoka to teach at the high school. Due to his background, his teaching philosophy differs from other teachers as he emphasises values over grades. This has led to disputes with other staff members, and in particular, chairman Kamiya.

- Keiko Kitagawa as Wakaba Enokido (榎戸若葉; 23)

The assistant homeroom teacher of class 3-1 and daughter of Kyoka. Although she is a graduate from Tokyo University, she became a teacher because she does not know what she wants to do in her life. Initially critical of Sakutaro's teaching methods, she gradually came to respect his teaching methods.

- Tetsuhiro Ikeda as Yasunori Akagi
- Michiko Kichise as Haruka Mayama
- Keiko Toda as Kyoka Hasebe, the principal of Shonan High School
- Fumiyo Kohinata as Ryunosuke Kamiya

The chairman of the school management committee

=== Students ===
- Kie Kitano as Riku Shirasaki (白崎凜久; 17)

A close friend of Hiroki since elementary school and subsequently his girlfriend. Her family owns the cafe "CAFE SEA-LASS", a popular hangout for students in class 3-1. Her childhood is played by Nana Shirasaka

- Masaki Okada as Hiroki Negishi
- Gaku Hamada - Hachiro Tabata
- Yuriko Yoshitaka - Akari Yashima
- Satoshi Tomiura as Yamato Kusunoki
- Akira Kagimoto as Moichi Higaki
- Mitsuki Tanimura as Hana Sawamiju
- Yusuke Yamamoto as Eiji Kawabe
- Manami Kurose as Yuna Takabayashi
- Yuichi Nakamura as Masayuki Misaki
- Aya Omasa - Yukino Tsugihara
- Kento Kaku as Keigo Banno
- Atsuko Maeda as Mayu Hunaki
- Shiori Kutsuna as Risa Huzisawa
