= Omiai Kekkon =

- Also known as: Match Making
- お見合い結婚
- Written by: Noriko Yoshida
- Directed by: Takao Kinoshita; Masayuki Takahashi; Masataka Suzuki
- Starring: Takako Matsu; Yūsuke Santamaria
- Composer: Mitsuharu Ishibashi
- Original language: Japanese

Production
- Producer: Atsuhiro Sugio

Original release
- Release: 11 January – 21 March 2000

Omiai Kekkon (お見合い結婚, Match Making) is a Japanese comedy drama series that aired on Fuji TV in Japan from 11 January to 21 March 2000.

== Synopsis ==
Setsuko Nakatani (Takako Matsu) quit her job as a stewardess in order to marry her boyfriend at the time, Hiroshi. As it didn't work out, Setsuko's parents, worried that time is passing her by, decide to introduce her to someone using Omiai, the Japanese meeting custom for marriage prospects. She meets Kōtaro Hirose (Yūsuke Santamaria), pressured by his boss to get married before being entrusted with an important job overseas. Initially, the two are not interested, but after some funny misadventures, they grow to like each other.

== Cast ==
- Takako Matsu as Setsuko Nakatani
- Yūsuke Santamaria as Koutaro Hirose
- Tamao Satō as Mika Kawai
- Yosuke Kubozuka as Junichi Ohata
- Ayako Kawahara as Kyoko Haneda
- Masayuki Imai as Kensuke Tanuma

== Theme songs ==
- Opening song: First Impression by Yaen
- Ending song: Sakura no Ame, Itsuka by Takako Matsu
