= Tokyo Wangan Police Station =

Coordinates: 35°37′07″N 139°46′28″E

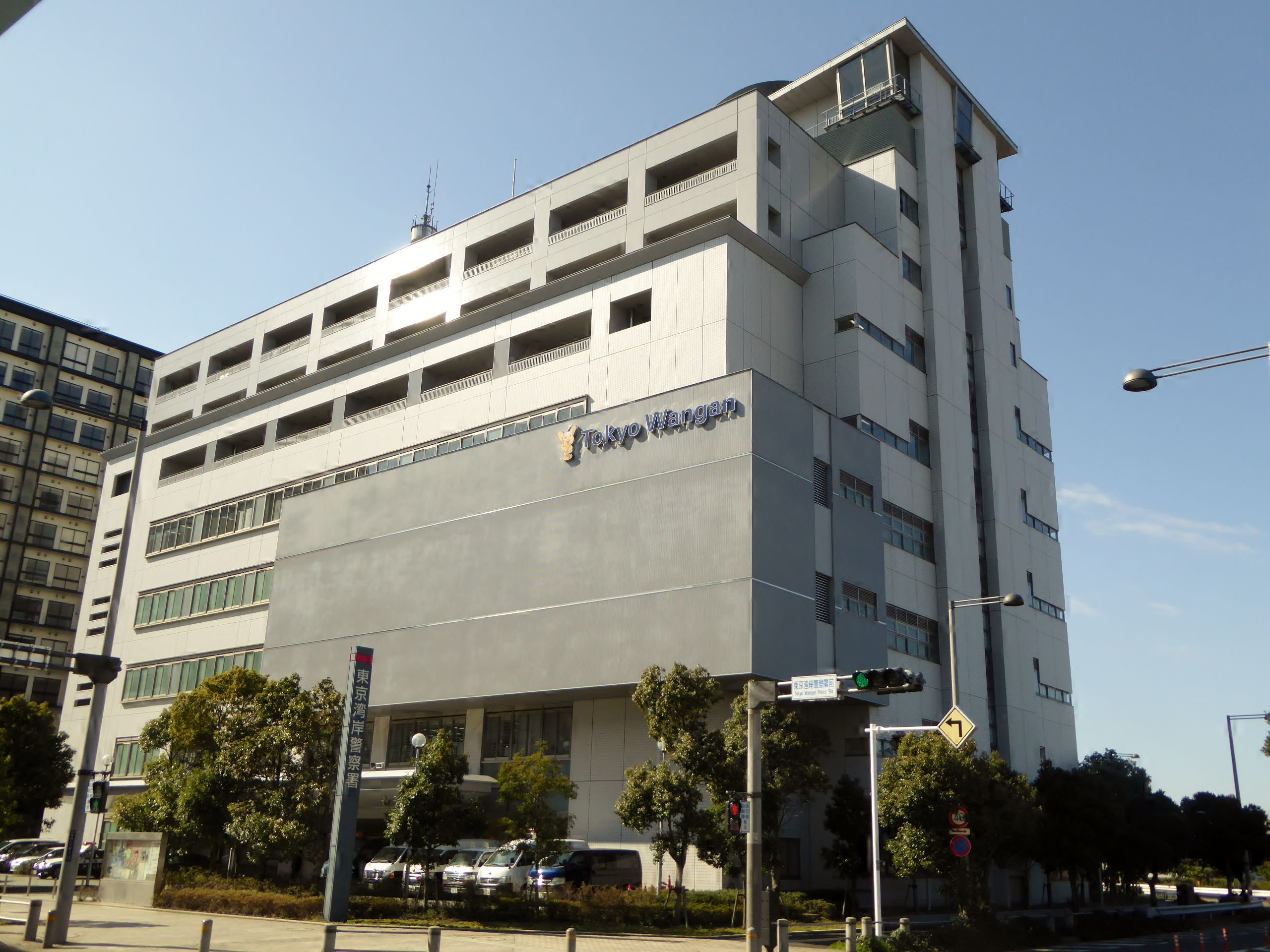
The exterior of the Tokyo Wangan Police Station

Tokyo Wangan Police Station (東京湾岸警察署, Tōkyō Wangan Kēsatsusyo) is a police station in Kōtō, Tokyo. It is operated by the Tokyo Metropolitan Police Department.

== History ==
In early 2004, as Tokyo's Wangan area rapidly developed, the creation of a new police station was brought up. In June 2005, the TMPD confirmed a new station would be constructed.

The tentative name in the 2005 plan was "Rinkō Police Station". However, with the popularity of the Bayside Shakedown franchise, which centers around the police station, it was decided that another possible name would be "Wangan Police Station". A survey of local residents to name the new station was overwhelmingly in favor of "Wangan Police Station" (湾岸署). Since "Wangan Police Station" is a copyrighted term of Fuji Television, the TMPD added "Tokyo" before to avoid issues. On June 27, 2007, the official name was confirmed to be "Tokyo Wangan Police Station".

Construction of the police station was finished in February 2008 and it opened on March 31, 2008.
