= Mayu Tsuruta =

Japanese actress

Mayu Tsuruta (鶴田 真由, born April 25, 1970, in Kamakura, Kanagawa, Japan) is an actress. In 1996, she was nominated by the Award of the Japanese Academy for Best Supporting Actress for her performance in the film Kike wadatsumi no koe Last Friends. Following the chaos of Kenya's 2007 presidential election, on March 30, 2008, she visited thousands of internal refugees at Kenya's Nakuru ASK grounds, as a goodwill ambassador for Tokyo International Conference on African Development. While surveying the situation at the refugee camp, she spent time with several families and helped distribute food aid.

== Filmography ==
=== Film ===
- Graduation Journey: I Came from Japan (1993)
- Kike wadatsumi no koe Last Friends (1995)
- Sōrito Yobanaide (1997)
- Owls' Castle (1999)
- Mr. Rookie (2002)
- Half a Confession (2004)
- Year One in the North (2005)
- Katenkoru (2005)
- Hotori no Sakuko (2013)
- The Ravine of Goodbye (2013)
- Destiny: The Tale of Kamakura (2017)
- Umi wo Kakeru (2018)
- Katsu Fūtarō!! (2019)
- Noise (2022)
- One Day, You Will Reach the Sea (2022)
- You Made My Dawn (2023), Keiko Niwa
- Family (2023)
- Angel Flight: The Movie (2026), Misako Kikuchi
- Iroha (2026)

=== Television ===
- Atsuhime (2008), Shiga
- Ranman (2023), Ōhata Ichi
- Brothers in Arms (2026), Kissho

=== Dubbing ===
- Charlotte's Web (Charlotte)
