= Chosuke Ikariya =

Japanese comedian and actor

Chōsuke Ikariya いかりや長介
- Born: Chōichi Ikariya 碇矢長一; November 1, 1931; Higashi-komagata, Sumida, Tokyo, Japan
- Died: March 20, 2004 (aged 72); The Jikei University Hospital, Minato, Tokyo, Japan

Chōsuke Ikariya (いかりや長介, Ikariya Chōsuke; November 1, 1931 – March 20, 2004) was a Japanese comedian and film actor, and leader of the comedy group The Drifters. His nickname was "Chō-san" (長さん).

== Life and career ==
=== 1931–1962: Childhood and early career ===
Chōsuke Ikariya was born with the name Chōichi Ikariya (碇矢長一, Ikariya Chōichi) on November 1, 1931, in Tokyo, Japan. During the war his family moved from their home in Sumida, Tokyo to the countryside in Shizuoka. There he took up a job as a factory worker as a young man. He also took up playing the double bass, a hint at his performer nature. He got rather good, too, performing in brass bands until he got a regular job with the "Jimmie Tokita & His Mountain Playboys." It was a band that specialised in playing at G.I. bases at the time and had guitarist Takeshi Terauchi. However, during that time in his life he was one of the tallest members of the band, so he stood out. The audience often singled him out for never smiling, picking on him for amusement.

=== 1962–1969: The Drifters ===
In 1962, Ikariya joined The Drifters, an aspiring pop band that featured comedy routines in its performances of rock and roll music. Members joined and quit the band over the next two years until Ikariya, still persisting, became the leader of the five-member group. The band was able to scrape by though appearing on television afterwards, with Ikariya writing most of the material for the performances.

In 1966, The Drifters opened for The Beatles at the Nippon Budokan Hall in Tokyo, although apparently Ikariya didn't see it as much of an accomplishment as opposed to just another job.

=== 1969–1985: Hachiji dayo, Zenin Shugo ===
In 1969, a producer from TBS offered Ikariya and his Drifters a regular spot on a weekly show. Ikariya, once again, was skeptical, having learned a lot the hard way. But this program went on to become one of the most popular shows of its time, Hachiji dayo, Zenin Shugo!. Its low-brow humour and slapstick comedy made it popular with children, much to the dismay of parents at the time. After the show was over in 1985, Ikariya virtually left the Drifters and all members went on to pursue their own goals.

=== Acting career ===
After appearing in the 1987 Taiga drama Dokuganryu Masamune, he started his acting career in earnest. Ikariya had won the public's adoration by then and played a variety of fatherly roles on television and in film. His part in the drama Odoru Daisōsasen, which later went on to inspire two films, though, led him to what was the peak in his career - an Academy Award.

In 1990, he appeared in the Akira Kurosawa film Dreams. Ikariya won a Japan Academy Award in 1999 for the film Odoru Daisōsasen / Bayside Shakedown.

=== Death ===
Chōsuke Ikariya died on March 20, 2004, at the age of 72 of cancer of the lymph nodes.

== Awards and nominations ==
- In 1999, Chōsuke Ikariya won the Japanese Academy Awards of Best Supporting Actor for his performance of Heihachiro Waku in the film Bayside Shakedown.

== Filmography ==
=== Films ===
- Yume wa yoru hiraku (1967) - Apache
- Nani wa naku tomo zen'in shûgô!! (1967)
- Tenamonya yurei dochu (1967) - Doeman Togashi
- Dorifutazu desu yo! Zenshin zenshin matazenshin (1967)
- Dorifutazu desu yo! Totte totte torimakure (1967)
- Dorifutazu desu yo! Bôken bôken mata bôken (1968)
- Ii yu dana zenin shûgô!! (1969)
- Miyo-chan no tame nara zen'in shûgô!! (1969) - Chôkichi
- Dorifutazu desu yo! Zenin totsugeki (1969)
- Dorifutazu desu yo! Tokkun tokkun mata tokkun (1969)
- Onsen gerira dai shogeki (1970)
- Kigeki migimuke hidari! (1970)
- Kigeki kinô no teki wa kyô mo teki (1971)
- Za.Dorifutazu no kamo da!! Goyo da!! (1975) - Chokichi Ikari
- Seigida! Mikatada! Zeninshugo!! (1975) - Chotaro ikari
- Dreams (1990) - The crying demon
- My Sons (1991) - Jirō Katō
- Nagareita shichinin (1997) - Kihachi Mita
- Odoru daisosasen – The Movie (1998) - Heihachiro Waku
- 39 keihô dai sanjûkyû jô (1999) - Patient
- Go-Con! Japanese Love Culture (2000) - Chef
- Kawa no nagare no yō ni (2000) - Morishita
- Shiawase kazoku keikaku (2000) - Yuko's father
- Bayside Shakedown 2 (2003) - Heihachiro Waku
- My Lover Is a Sniper: The Movie (2004) - Gantaro Endoji (final film role)

=== TV Dramas ===
- Dokuganryu Masamune (1987) - Oniniwa Yoshinao
- Bayside Shakedown (1997, TV Movie) - Heihachiro Waku
- Interrogation Room (1994-2003)
- When the Saints Go Marching In (1998)
- Yomigaeru kinrō (1999) - Mogi
- Black Jack II (2000, TV Movie)
- Namida o fuite (2000) - Yuichiro Murata
- Shiroi Kage (2001) - Yoshizou Ishikura
- Gakkō no sensei (2001) - Chochiro asakura
- Psycho Doctor (2002) - Famous psychologist
- Anata no tonari ni dare ka iru (2003) - Goro Kazuma
- Good Luck!! (2003)
