= Graduation Journey: I Came from Japan =

1993 film by Shūsuke Kaneko

- Film poster
- Directed by: Shūsuke Kaneko
- Written by: Nobuyuki Isshiki
- Produced by: Hideyuki Takai; Makoto Yamashina; Yoshishige Shimatani; Tatsuo Watanabe
- Starring: Yūji Oda; Takeshi Kaga; Mayu Tsuruta; Kumi Mizuno
- Cinematography: Hiroshi Takase
- Edited by: Isao Tomita
- Music by: Kow Otani
- Production companies: Toho; Bandai
- Distributed by: Toho
- Release date: September 4, 1993 (Japan)
- Running time: 98 minutes
- Country: Japan
- Language: Japanese

Graduation Journey: I Came from Japan (Japanese: 卒業旅行 ニホンから来ました, Hepburn: Sotsugyō Ryokō Nihon kara Kimashita) is a 1993 Japanese film directed by Shūsuke Kaneko. It was distributed by Toho on September 4, 1993, in Japan. It stars Yūji Oda and Takeshi Kaga.

== Cast ==
- Yūji Oda
- Takeshi Kaga
- Mayu Tsuruta
- Kumi Mizuno
