= The War at Sea from Hawaii to Malaya =

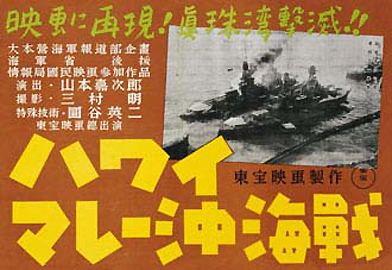
- Theatrical release poster
- Directed by: Kajiro Yamamoto
- Special effects by: Eiji Tsuburaya
- Written by: Kajiro Yamamoto
- Produced by: Nobuyoshi Morita
- Starring: Kaoru Ito; Susumu Fujita; Akitake Kohno; Setsuko Hara
- Cinematography: Akira Mimura; Mitsuo Miura
- Edited by: Fusao Hata
- Music by: Seiichi Suzuki
- Production company: Toho
- Distributed by: Film Distribution Corporation
- Release date: December 3, 1942 (Japan)
- Running time: 117 minutes
- Country: Japan
- Language: Japanese
- Budget: ¥1 million (Note: The film had a production budget of ¥770,000, with advertising costing an additional ¥150,000. Joseph L. Anderson stated that its budget was over US$380,000.)

The War at Sea from Hawaii to Malaya (Note: Japanese: ハワイ・マレー沖海戦, Hepburn: Hawai Marē Oki Kaisen) is a 1942 Japanese epic war film directed by Kajiro Yamamoto, with special effects by Eiji Tsuburaya. Produced by Toho and distributed by Film Distribution Corporation, the film is propaganda produced with support from the Navy Ministry that was intended to influence the Japanese public into believing they could prevail in the Pacific War.

The military reportedly converted the idea of a documentary film on the attack on Pearl Harbor that featured special effects since it was difficult to record footage of the attack. Prior to the attack and Japan's subsequent entry into World War II, an Imperial Japanese Navy official met Tsuburaya and requested the production of a film about the attack as soon as possible when the war broke out. Production took place from May to November 1942, on a record breaking budget of ¥770,000.

The War at Sea from Hawaii to Malaya was released on December 3, 1942, to critical acclaim. The film won Kinema Junpo's Best Picture Award and Tsuburaya received an award for his special effects. Reportedly viewed by 100 million people in Japan and its occupied territories, it became the highest-grossing film in the history of Japanese cinema upon its distribution.

== Plot ==
Full film with English subtitles

In 1936, Imperial Japanese Navy pilot Tadaaki Tachibana visits his aunt's farm, where younger cousin Yoshikazu Tomoda expresses his wish to become a pilot. Tadaaki encourages Yoshikazu only after challenging him to a cliff jump.

Yoshikazu undergoes basic training from 1937, participating in rowing, kendō, wrestling, and rugby. His drill instructor introduces the notion of facing adversity with the proper "spirit". One morning, the Marco Polo Bridge Incident is reported in the cadets' newspaper. The cadets intensify their training as the events of the Second Sino-Japanese War and the Second World War in Europe unfold. Their drill instructor declares that the situation in China may only be resolved through the defeat of the United States and the British Empire.

After a brief visit to his family, Yoshikazu progresses to training as a fighter pilot. He experiences survivor guilt when another cadet dies during a training exercise aboard an aircraft carrier. Tadaaki advises him not to give up his training, citing his own experiences in the military. Yoshikazu's sister Kikuko is concerned about the explosion of a world war, but informs him that their mother has accepted his decision to fight.

In late 1941, Yoshikazu is among those aboard an aircraft carrier destined for Pearl Harbor, although their mission is not immediately clear. As the pilots prepare for the attack, the officers listen for results over an American radio station. The mission is portrayed as a success: the torpedoes hit their intended target ships, and reinforcements engage in a dogfight with USAAF fighter planes. However, in a "precious sacrifice", one damaged Japanese plane crashes into an American hangar.

Meanwhile in Japanese-occupied French Indochina, a separate unit receives a briefing concerning the movements of HMS Repulse and HMS Prince of Wales. An initial attempt to bomb the ships during their nighttime departure from Singapore is aborted. Despite the ships leaving the range of the bombers, their crews are instructed to re-attempt the mission. The crew of one bomber, acknowledging that they lack the fuel to return home, proceeds with the attack on the British fleet. This mission too is successful, although the Prince of Wales incidentally sinks after the bomber runs out of ammunition.

Yoshikazu's family listens to a report of the attack on the radio, as do the officers aboard the aircraft carrier. One officer expresses his pleasure at Japan's strategic position.

== Cast ==
- Susumu Fujita
- Setsuko Hara
- Fumito Matsuo
- Kunio Mita
- Denjirō Ōkōchi
- Jiro Takano
- Daihachiro Takebayashi
- Haruo Tanaka
- Frank Tokunaga as Bunroku Tokunaga
- Hiroshi Yamagawa

== Production ==
=== Preproduction ===
Before Japan officially entered the war on the same day as the Pearl Harbor attack, Michibu Navy Major Shōichi Hamada reportedly met Tsuburaya and requested the production of a film about the attack as soon as possible when the war broke out.

=== Filming ===
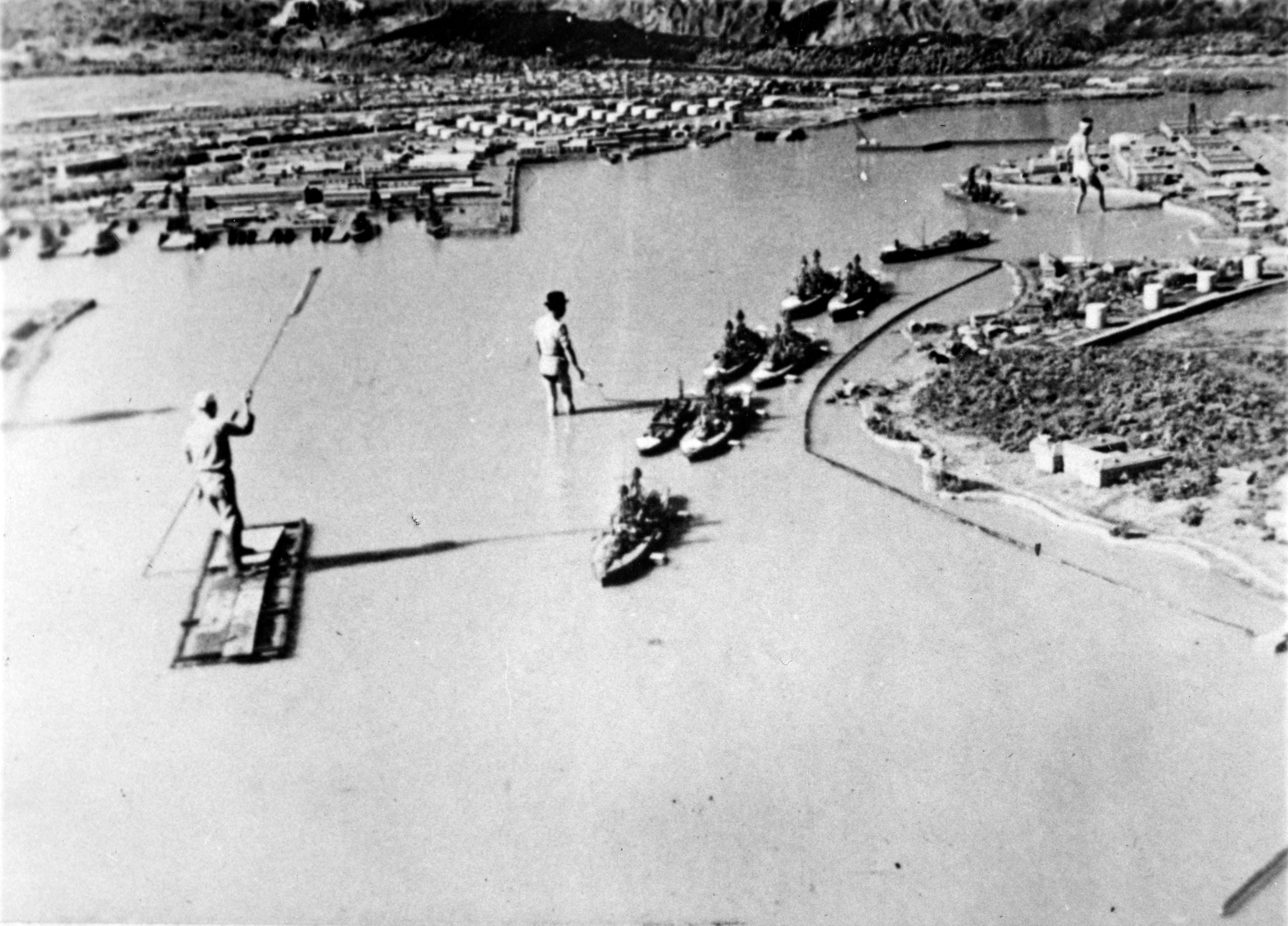
Film making; miniature set of the Pearl Harbor and American warships

Hawai Mare oki kaisen was the most costly film made in Japan up to that time, costing over $380,000, when a typical film cost no more than $40,000. It used special effects and miniature models to create realistic battle scenes. These were intercut with genuine newsreel material to make the appearance of a documentary. The film was released during the week of the first anniversary of the Japanese attack on Pearl Harbor.

The special effects are by Eiji Tsuburaya.

== Reception ==
=== Box office ===
Within its first eight days at the Japanese box office, the film had grossed ¥1,115,000. According to Toho, it was viewed by 100 million people in Japan and the country's occupied territories.

=== Critical response ===
Joseph L. Anderson comments that Hawai Mare oki kaisen was "representative of the national-policy films", with the aim of dramatizing "the Navy Spirit as culminated at Pearl Harbor." Critics at the time considered it the best film of 1942.

=== Douglas MacArthur's response ===
The War at Sea from Hawaii to Malaya was confiscated by Supreme Command Allied Powers after the war, who mistook it for genuine news footage of the attack, and it was released by Movietone as such.

=== Accolades ===
| Award | Category | Recipient(s) | Result | Ref. |
|---|---|---|---|---|
| Kinema Junpo Awards | Best Picture Award | The War at Sea from Hawaii to Malaya | Won | |
| Japan Motion Picture Cinematographers Association | Visual Effects | Eiji Tsuburaya | Won | |

== See also ==
- Storm Over the Pacific, Toho, 1960
