= Yūji Oda =

Japanese actor and singer

- 織田 裕二
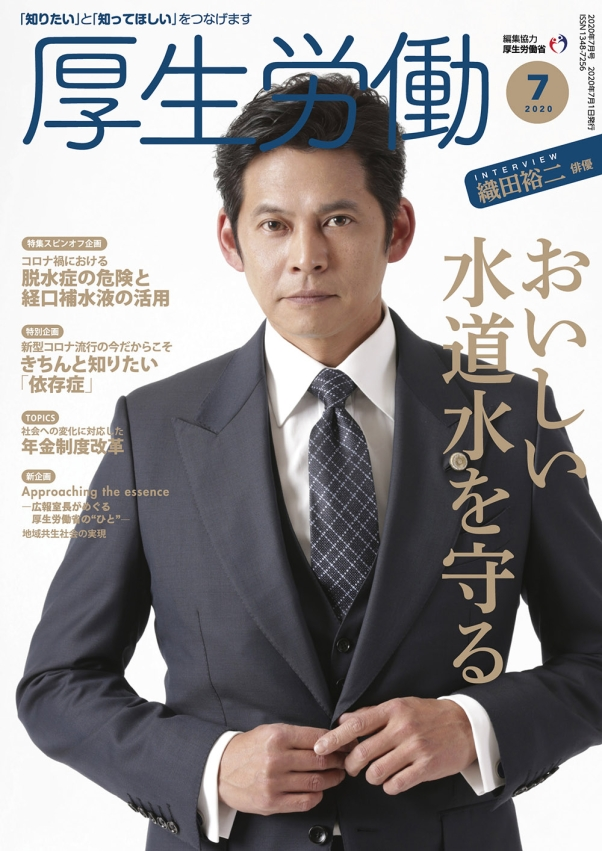
- Oda in 2020
- Born: December 13, 1967 (age 58); Kawasaki, Kanagawa, Japan
- Occupations: Actor; singer
- Years active: 1987–present
- Notable work: Bayside Shakedown
- Spouse: Maiko (m. 2010)
- Children: 1

Yūji Oda (織田 裕二, Oda Yūji; born December 13, 1967) is a Japanese actor and singer. He is one of Japan's 11 most popular male entertainers, according to an NHK survey taken in 2004. In one survey, he was the second most popular actor after Takuya Kimura in Japan during the Heisei era (1989-2019).

== Biography ==
Oda was born in Kawasaki, Kanagawa. In the late 1980s, he launched his career with the release of two singles on records.

In 1989, he appeared in the television drama Mama Haha Boogie, from which point he started to gain popularity as an actor, which also brought attention to his singing aspirations.

In 1991, he appeared in the enormously popular television drama Tokyo Love Story, a breakout role. He then became a leading man in Japanese film and television, generally playing the role of a sympathetic character.

His most famous role is Shunsaku Aoshima, a police detective in the Bayside Shakedown film and television drama series.

== Personal life ==
On August 16, 2010, Oda married a non-celebrity woman 12 years younger than him. His wife gave birth to their son in October 2014. After the birth, Oda took a break from work for two years to help focus on child rearing.

== Filmography ==
=== Film ===
Year	Title	Role	Notes	Ref.
1987	Shōnan Bakusōzoku	Akira Ishikawa		
1987	Ai wa Crossover	Yuji		
1989	Shogun's Shadow	Tobe Saheiji		
1989	Urban Marine Resort Story	Fumio Yoshioka		
1990	Best Guy	Lt. Hideo "Goku" Kajitani	Lead role	
1991	Cover as Many Waves as Possible	Masaki Kosugi		
1991	No Worries on the Recruit Front	Takeo Ohara	Lead role	
1992	Angel, Boku to uta wa kimi no uta	Tatsuhiko	Lead role	
1994	Graduation Journey: I Came from Japan	Yasuo Mitsugi	Lead role	
1995	Kike wadatsumi no koe: Last Friends		Lead role	
1998	Bayside Shakedown	Shunsaku Aoshima	Lead role	
2000	Whiteout	Teruo Togashi	Lead role	
2003	T.R.Y.	Shū Izawa	Lead role	
2003	Bayside Shakedown 2	Shunsaku Aoshima	Lead role	
2006	Star Reformer	Satoshi Nomura	Lead role	
2007	Sanjuro	Sanjuro Tsubaki	Lead role	
2009	Amalfi: Rewards of the Goddess	Kosaku Kuroda	Lead role	
2010	Bayside Shakedown 3	Shunsaku Aoshima	Lead role	
2011	Andalucia: Revenge of the Goddess	Kosaku Kuroda	Lead role	
2012	Bayside Shakedown: The Final	Shunsaku Aoshima	Lead role	
2016	Will You Marry My Wife?	Shūji Mimura	Lead role	
2024	Shinji Muroi: Stay Alive	Shunsaku Aoshima	Cameo	
2026	Bayside Shakedown: N.E.W	Shunsaku Aoshima	Lead role	

=== Television ===
Year	Title	Role	Notes	Ref.
1989	Mama Haha Bugi	Makoto Mizutani		
1991	Tokyo Love Story	Kanji "Kanchi" Nagao	Lead role	
1993	Furikaereba Yatsu ga Iru	Kōtarō Shiba	Lead role	
1993	It's a Wonderful Life	Mitsugu Shibaki		
1994	I have no money!	Kentarō Hagiwara	Lead role	
1995	Seigi wa Katsu	Junpei Takaoka	Lead role	
1996	Mahiru no Tsuki	Naoki Togashi	Lead role	
1997	Bayside Shakedown	Shunsaku Aoshima	Lead role	
2001	Rocket Boy	Shinpei Kobayashi	Lead role	
2002	Midnight Rain	Takashi Tokura	Lead role	
2004	Last Christmas	Kenji Haruki	Lead role	
2008	Homeroom on the Beachside	Sakutarō Sakurai	Lead role	
2010	The Diplomat Kosaku Kuroda	Kosaku Kuroda	Lead role	
2016	IQ246	Sharaku Hōmonji	Lead role	
2018	Nozaki Shuhei Auditor of Bank	Shuhei Nozaki	Lead role	
2018–20	Suits	Shōgo Kai	Lead role; 2 seasons	
2023	Galápagos	Shin'ichi Tagawa	Lead role; miniseries	
2023	Legal Enforcement with Dogs	Itsuki Obara		
2026	Water Margin	Song Jiang	Lead role	

== Discography ==
=== Albums ===
Title	Release date	Notes	Label
On the Road	1990-03-20		Toshiba EMI
Gyakufū (逆風)	1991-07-12		Toshiba EMI
Oda Yūji Singles (織田裕二SINGLES)	1991-10-30		Toshiba EMI
Songs	1991-12-10		WEA Japan
Kodo (KODO－鼓動－, kodō)	1992-02-19		Toshiba EMI
Kesshin (決心)	1993-09-22		Toshiba EMI
Screen Play	1994-09-07		Toshiba EMI
The Best	1995-09-27		Toshiba EMI
River	1995-12-06		Mercury Music Entertainment
Stay Here	1996-11-11		Mercury
Stay Here+2	1997-03-26		Mercury
Shake!!	1998-06-17		Mercury
The Best Tracks	1998-11-26		Mercury
My Pocket	1999-09-29		Mercury
Secret Rendez-vous	2000-07-05		Mercury
Hot & Sweet-Sour Soup: Best of Love Song	2001-03-23		Kitty MME
11 Colors	2003-08-20		Universal J
Arigatō (ありがとう)	2007-09-26		

=== Singles ===
Title	Release date	Notes	Label
"Boom Boom Boom / Hold You Tight"	1987-04-25		WEA Japan
"Shūmatsu Dake wa Shōnen" (週末だけは少年)	1989-07-25		WEA Japan
"Utae Nakatte Love Song" (歌えなかってラブ・ソング)	1991-02-06		Toshiba EMI
"Genzai, kono Shunkan kara" (現在，この瞬間から)	1991-06-07		Toshiba EMI
"Happy Birthday"	1991-11-06		Toshiba EMI
"Kodo"	1992-01-29		Toshiba EMI
"Ano Natsu ga Kikoeru" (あの夏が聴こえる)	1992-05-27		Toshiba EMI
"Kesshin" (決心)	1993-07-19		Toshiba EMI
"Over the Trouble"	1994-07-08		Toshiba EMI
"Never Rain"	1994-10-05		Toshiba EMI
"Ai made Mousugu Da kara" (愛までもうすぐだから)	1995-11-08		Mercury Music Entertainment
"Mirage"	1996-10-28		Mercury
"Love Somebody"	1997-01-29	with Maxi Priest	Mercury
"Over and Over Again"	1997-07-16		Mercury
"Freedom"	1998-02-04		Mercury
"Shake it Up"	1998-05-13		Mercury
"Love Somebody"	1998-10-28	with Maxi Priest	Mercury
"Something to Say"	1999-03-17		Mercury
"Together"	1999-08-25		Mercury
"Sora no Mukōmade" (空のむこうまで)	2001-02-28		Kitty MME
"Sonna Mondarō" (そんなもんだろう)	2002-11-13		Universal J
"We can be Heroes"	2003-01-01		Universal J
"Love Somebody"	2003-06-25	with Maxi Priest	Universal J
"Love Somebody (Cinema Version II)"	2003-07-16	with Mýa	Universal J
"Last Christmas"/"Wake Me Up Go! Go!"	2004-11-03	with Butch Walker	Epic Japan
"Hug, Hug"	2007-04-25		Universal J
"All my Treasures"	2007-07-25	2007 World Championships in Athletics Osaka Games Theme Song	Universal Sigma
"Feel Live"	2007-12-05		
"Can't Take My Eyes Off You"	2008-08-12	as "UZ"	

== Awards and nominations ==
Year	Award	Category	Work(s)	Result	Ref.
1992	1st TV Life Annual Drama Awards	Best Actor	Tokyo Love Story	Won	
2000	43rd Blue Ribbon Awards	Best Actor	Whiteout	Won	
2000	25th Hochi Film Awards	Best Actor	Whiteout	Won	
2001	24th Japan Academy Film Prize	Best Actor	Whiteout	Nominated	
