= Bayside Shakedown (film) =

Odoru daisosasen – The Movie
- Directed by: Katsuyuki Motohiro
- Screenplay by: Ryoichi Kimizuka
- Produced by: Chihiro Kameyama
- Starring: Yuji Oda; Toshirō Yanagiba; Eri Fukatsu; Miki Mizuno
- Cinematography: Osamu Fujishi
- Music by: Akihiko Matsumoto
- Production company: Fuji Television Network
- Distributed by: Toho
- Release date: 31 October 1998 (Japan)
- Running time: 119 minutes
- Country: Japan

Odoru daisosasen – The Movie (踊る大捜査線 THE MOVIE 湾岸署史上最悪の3日間!, Odoru Daisōsasen za Mūbī Wangan-sho Shijō Saiaku no Surī-kakan!), known internationally as Bayside Shakedown, is a 1998 Japanese crime comedy film directed by Katsuyuki Motohiro. The film was adapted from the 1997 television series Bayside Shakedown.

The film is set in Tokyo, and focuses on the rivalry between two neighboring police precincts over jurisdiction in a new case. A Detective Sergeant is pushing for significant reforms, while his superiors are setting him up to take the fall in case of failure in a high-profile kidnapping case. The film was followed by the sequel Bayside Shakedown 2 in 2003.

== Plot ==
The film continues a few months after the end of the TV series. The main character Detective Sergeant Shunsaku Aoshima has worked his way back up into the investigative division of the Wangan Precinct of the Tokyo Metropolitan Police Department, after being demoted back to patrol duty for insubordination.

A body is found floating in a river near the edge of the precinct's jurisdiction. However, the main concern of the officers on the scene is getting to the body before their counterparts from the other precinct on the other side of the river get to it. The scene eventually degenerates into a cross-river shouting match over bullhorns between the officers from the two precincts. The brass at Wangan Station turn out to be less than happy when their officers manage to recover the body (which has had a teddy bear crudely stuffed into its stomach) as it would require a special investigation, which would drain more from the station's already tight budget. At the same time, the station is in an uproar as officers find that someone has been stealing the receipts for on the job expenses that they had originally intended to file for reimbursement.

Things are further complicated when the Assistant Commissioner is kidnapped and the investigative team from Metropolitan Police headquarters moves into Wangan Station. The investigation is led by Superintendent Shinji Muroi, whom Aoshima previously befriended. Having promised Aoshima that he would try to reform the bureaucratic mess within the police department and force the local and headquarters officers to work together as equals, Muroi finds that his promise increasingly hard to keep as his decisions are continuously overruled from above by superiors who insist on playing everything by the book. It becomes apparent that Muroi's superiors are setting him up to take the fall in the event the investigation fails.

The stratification in the department becomes apparent when the investigators from headquarters immediately delegate the most menial of tasks to the local officers, while receiving special treatment enjoying gourmet bentos while the locals are forced to dine on instant ramen. The locals are forced to work multiple cases at the same time, and find themselves berated by their superiors when mistakes are inevitably made.

The film goes on to take on issues such as disaffected youth unable to differentiate between reality and video games, overprotective parents, strange internet subcultures; and on more lighthearted notes, the lack of sidearms, otaku obsessed with cosplay, media frenzies, and even overtly melodramatic movie scenes, as Aoshima and his fellow officers continue to press on through the absurdity.

== Cast ==
- Yūji Oda as Sergeant Shunsaku Aoshima
- Toshirō Yanagiba as Superintendent Shinji Muroi
- Eri Fukatsu as Sergeant Sumire Onda
- Miki Mizuno as Yukino Kashiwagi
- Yūsuke Santamaria as Inspector Masayoshi Mashita
- Kyōko Koizumi as Manami Hyuga
- Chosuke Ikariya as Senior Inspector Heihachiro Waku
- Kenta Satoi as Section Chief Uozumi
- Toshio Kakei as Superintendent Shinjo
- Soichiro Kitamura as Chief Kanda
- Takehiko Ono as Division Chief Hakamada
- Satoru Saito as Assistant Chief Akiyama
- Masane Tsukayama as Shizuo Ikegami

== Production ==
Odoru daisosasen was given a budget of $3 million by Fuji Television Network. However, production exceeded its budget by $2 million, prompting producer Chihiro Kameyama to write multiple letters explaining the cost overrun.

== Release ==
Odoru daisosasen - The Movie was released in Japan on 31 October 1998 with a 119-minute running time by Toho.

== Reception ==
Odoru daisosasen – The Movie won several awards. These included "Reader's Choice Award - Best Film" from Mainichi Film Concours, and three Japanese Academy Awards for Best Supporting Actor (Chosuke Ikariya), Best Sound, and Most Popular Performer (Yuji Oda).
