= Toshirō Yanagiba =

Japanese actor

Toshiro Yanagiba
- 柳葉 敏郎
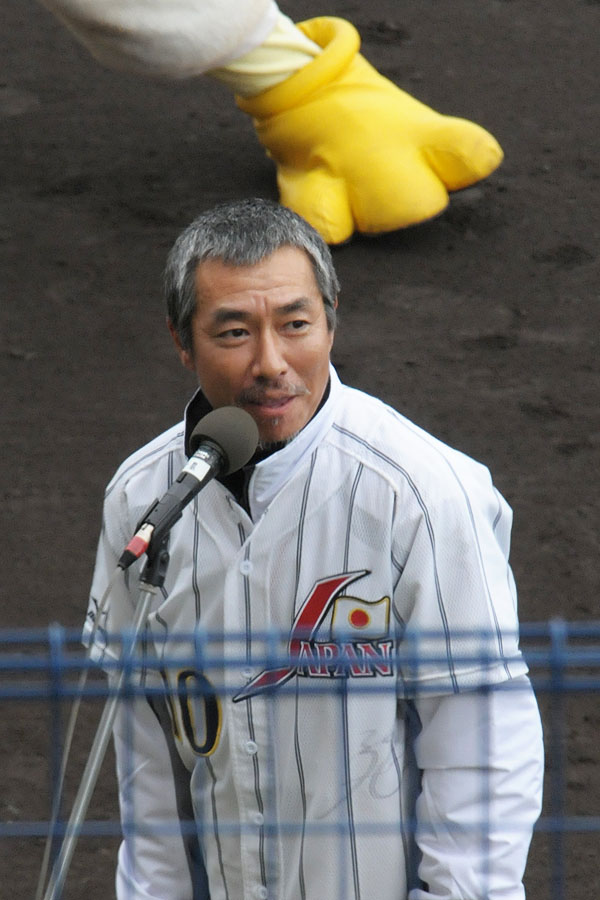
- Toshiro Yanagiba in May 2012
- Born: 山田 敏郎 (Toshiro Yamada); January 3, 1961 (age 65); Daisen, Akita, Japan
- Occupation: Actor
- Years active: 1980–present

Toshiro Yanagiba (柳葉 敏郎, Yanagiba Toshirō; born January 3, 1961) is a Japanese actor.

== Career ==
Yanagiba has appeared in films such as the Bayside Shakedown series, Chinese Dinner, and Space Battleship Yamato.

== Filmography ==
=== Film ===
- Run Towards the South On the Road of Sea (1986)
- Young Girls in Love (1986)
- Hachiko Monogatari (1987)
- Hope and Pain (1988)
- Only Yesterday (1991)
- Bayside Shakedown: The Movie (1998), Shinji Muroi
- Senrigan (2000)
- Colorful (2000)
- Chinese Dinner (2001)
- Bayside Shakedown 2 (2003), Shinji Muroi
- Year One in the North (2005)
- Lorelei: The Witch of the Pacific Ocean (2005)
- Negotiator (2005), Shinji Muroi
- The Suspect (2005), Shinji Muroi
- Oh! Oku (2006)
- Nobody to Watch Over Me (2008)
- Bayside Shakedown 3 (2010), Shinji Muroi
- Space Battleship Yamato (2010), Shirō Sanada
- Isoroku (2011), Shigeyoshi Inoue
- Bayside Shakedown The Final (2012), Shinji Muroi
- Reunion (2012)
- Kōfuku no Alibi (2012)
- Any Crybabies Around? (2020)
- Hikari wo Oikakete (2021)
- A Morning of Farewell (2021)
- The Three Sisters of Tenmasou Inn (2022)
- Baian the Assassin, M.D. (2023)
- Shylock's Children (2023), Kaoru Kujō
- Shinji Muroi: Not Defeated (2024), Shinji Muroi
- Shinji Muroi: Stay Alive (2024), Shinji Muroi

=== Television ===
- Taiheiki (1991), Ishi
- Bayside Shakedown (1997), Shinji Muroi
- Ring: The Final Chapter (1999), Kazuyuki Asakawa
- Hōjō Tokimune (2001), Adachi Yasumori
- The Family (2007), Shoichi Mikumo
- The Waste Land (2009), Isao Kawamata
- The Great White Tower (2019), Yōhei Sasaki
- Boogie Woogie (2023), Umekichi Hanada
