= Bayside Shakedown 2 =

2003 Japanese film by Katsuyuki Motohiro

- Official theatrical poster released in English
- Directed by: Katsuyuki Motohiro (Robot
- Screenplay by: Ryoichi Kimizuka
- Produced by: Shūji Abe; Chihiro Kameyama
- Starring: Yūji Oda; Toshirō Yanagiba; Eri Fukatsu
- Production company: Robot
- Distributed by: Toho
- Release date: 19 July 2003 (Japan)
- Running time: 138 minutes
- Country: Japan
- Language: Japanese
- Box office: ¥17.35 billion ($164.45 million) (Japan)

Bayside Shakedown 2 (Japanese: 踊る大捜査線 THE MOVIE 2 レインボーブリッジを封鎖せよ!, Hepburn: Odoru Daisōsasen za Mūbī Tsū Reinbō Burizzi o Fūsa Seyo!) is a 2003 Japanese crime comedy film directed by Katsuyuki Motohiro and distributed by Toho. It is the second film based on the popular Bayside Shakedown TV series, known for its unique and humorous depiction of the Japanese police force while avoiding the conventions that define most police dramas.

Bayside Shakedown 2 was released on 19 July 2003, and became the all-time highest-grossing Japanese live-action movie on domestic screens, earning ¥17.35 billion ($164.45 million) at the box office. It held the record for 22 years until it was surpassed by Kokuho in 2025 in terms of yen; the film remains with the record in terms of USD.

== Plot ==
The movie takes place again in the fictional Wangan Station of the Tokyo Metropolitan Police Department, in the five years since the previous movie, the once empty space within Wangan's jurisdiction (the station was once referred to disparagingly as "the empty space station" by the surrounding jurisdictions) has become a popular tourist attraction, the officers at Wangan Station now have their hands full dealing with all manner of tourist related issues. In a sign of how much has not changed in the last five years, when Detective Sergeant Shunsaku Aoshima and several of other detectives playing the part of terrorists defeat a Special Assault Team unit during a counterterrorism exercise in front of the police brass and the media, all the detectives promptly have their pay docked by headquarters.

When a string of murders of company execs begins taking place, Aoshima jumps at the opportunity to pursue something other than his current case, which he finds less than inspiring. However, the powers that be have other ideas, and Wangan again plays host to a special investigation team from headquarters, led by Superintendent Okita, whose inflexible methods, reliance on technology over old-fashioned police work, and condescending attitude towards the locals quickly leads to one fiasco after another, with the local officers working to clean up the resulting mess. Aoshima's friend Superintendent Shinji Muroi, assigned by headquarters to assist Okita, is again powerless to help the local officers as decisions are made by the higher ups.

== Cast ==
- Yūji Oda as Sergeant Shunsaku Aoshima
- Toshirō Yanagiba as Superintendent Shinji Muroi
- Eri Fukatsu as Sergeant Sumire Onda
- Miki Mizuno as Sergeant Yukino Kashiwagi
- Yūsuke Santamaria as Inspector Masayoshi Mashita
- Miki Maya as Superintendent Okita
- Chosuke Ikariya as Senior Inspector Heihachiro Waku
- Kenta Satoi as Section Chief Uozumi
- Toshio Kakei as Superintendent Shinjo
- Kotaro Koizumi as Surveillance Room Operator Shigeru Koike
- Soichiro Kitamura as Chief Kanda
- Takehiko Ono as Division Chief Hakamada
- Satoru Saito as Assistant Chief Akiyama
- John Sledge as American in Casino

== Reception ==
During nine successive weeks it was number-one, a record that hasn't been matched since by a domestic live action film.

== See also ==
- Bayside Shakedown
- Bayside Shakedown: The Movie
- List of highest-grossing films in Japan
