= Kenta Satoi =

Japanese actor

Kenta Satoi (佐戸井けん太, Satoi Kenta), born May 14, 1957, in the Chiba Prefecture, Japan, is a Japanese theatre and film actor. His roles most often consist of either father-type roles, or conversely, villain roles in police dramas and action movies. In the sho-gekijo theatre realm he is known for playing a wide variety of character roles.

Satoi is 183 cm tall, and his hobbies are basketball and rakugo "sit-down" comedy.

== Filmography ==
=== Television ===
- Bayside Shakedown (1997), Jiro Uozumi
- Idaten (2019)
- Mashin Sentai Kiramager (2020)
- Detective Yuri Rintaro (2020), Takehiko Yuasa (ep. 1)
- Reach Beyond the Blue Sky (2021), Hotta Masayoshi

Unknown date

- Ariadne no Dangan (xxxx) (ep. 1)
- 2nd House (xxxx)
- 101 proposals (xxxx)
- Kita no Kuni Kara (xxxx)
- Furuhata Ninzaburō (xxxx)
- AIBOU: Tokyo Detective Duo (xxxx)
- Trick (xxxx)

=== Film ===
- The Cat Returns (2002), Natori (voice)
- Iwane: Sword of Serenity (2019)
- Aristocrats (2021)
- Bayside Shakedown: N.E.W (2026), Jiro Uozumi
