= Katsuyuki Motohiro =

Japanese film director

- Born: July 13, 1965 (age 60); Marugame, Kagawa, Japan
- Occupation: Film director

Katsuyuki Motohiro (本広克行, Motohiro Katsuyuki; born July 13, 1965) is a Japanese film director.

== Filmography ==
- Odoru Daisosasen Bangaihen – Wangansho Fukei Monogatari Shoka no Kôtsûanzen Special (1998)
- Bayside Shakedown: The Movie (1998)
- Space Travelers (2000)
- Satorare (2001)
- Bayside Shakedown 2 (2003)
- Summer Time Machine Blues (2005)
- Shaolin Girl (2008)
- Bayside Shakedown 3 (2010)
- Psycho-Pass (2012)
- Bayside Shakedown The Final (2012)
- Psycho-Pass: The Movie (2015)
- Maku ga Agaru (2015)
- Ajin: Demi-Human (2017)
- Laughing Under the Clouds (2018)
- FLCL Progressive (2018)
- FLCL Alternative (2018)
- Human Lost (2019)
- Beautiful Dreamer (2020)
- Brave: Gunjō Senki (2021)
- Shinji Muroi: Not Defeated (2024)
- Shinji Muroi: Stay Alive (2024)
- Bayside Shakedown N.E.W. (2026)
