= Ryoichi Kimizuka =

Japanese screenwriter and director

Ryoichi Kimizuka (君塚良一, Kimizuka Ryōichi; born 21 April 1958, in Minato, Tokyo) is a Japanese screenwriter and director for television and film.

== Career ==
Kimizuka first entered the Japanese television industry by working on variety shows under Kin'ichi Hagimoto. He then began writing screenplays for television dramas, including such hits as Zutto anata ga suki datta and Bayside Shakedown. He has branched out into screenplays for film, including the hit Bayside Shakedown films, as well as directing.

== Awards ==
Kimizuka won the award for best screenplay for Bayside Shakedown: The Movie at the 1998 Yokohama Film Festival, and for Nobody to Watch Over Me at the 2008 Montreal World Film Festival.

== Selected works ==
=== Television screenplays ===
- Zutto anata ga suki datta (1992)
- Toki o Kakeru Shōjo (時をかける少女) (1994)
- Bayside Shakedown (1997)

=== Film screenplays ===
- Parasite Eve (1997)
- Bayside Shakedown: The Movie (踊る大捜査線 THE MOVIE 湾岸署史上最悪の3日間! Odoru Daisōsasen za Mūbī Wangansho Shijōsaiaku no Mikkakan!) (1998)
- Tales of the Unusual (世にも奇妙な物語 - 映画の特別編 Yo ni mo kimyō na monogatari - Eiga no tokubetsuhen) (2000)
- Bayside Shakedown 2 (踊る大捜査線 THE MOVIE 2 レインボーブリッジを封鎖せよ! Odoru Daisōsasen za Mūbī Tsū Reinbōburizzi o Fūsaseyo!?) (2003)
- Infection (感染 Kansen) (2004)
- Bubble Fiction: Boom or Bust (バブルへGO!!～タイムマシンはドラム式～ Baburu e go!! Taimu mashin wa doramu-shiki) (2007)

=== Films directed ===
- Makoto (2005) (also screenplay)
- Nobody to Watch Over Me (誰も守ってくれない Dare mo mamotte kurenai) (2008) (also screenplay)
