= Bayside Shakedown: The Final =

- DVD cover
- Directed by: Katsuyuki Motohiro
- Based on: Bayside Shakedown
- Distributed by: Toho
- Release date: September 7, 2012
- Running time: 126 minutes
- Country: Japan
- Language: Japanese
- Box office: ¥5.97 billion

Bayside Shakedown: The Final (踊る大捜査線 THE FINAL 新たなる希望, Odoru Daisōsasen za Fainaru Arata Naru Kibō) is a 2012 Japanese suspense action comedy film directed by Katsuyuki Motohiro. It was released on September 7, 2012. The film is set two years after Bayside Shakedown 3.

== Cast ==
- Yūji Oda as Shunsaku Aoshima
- Toshirō Yanagiba as Shinji Muroi
- Eri Fukatsu as Sumire Onda
- Yūsuke Santamaria as Masayoshi Mashita
- Shun Oguri

== Reception ==
The film was the third highest-grossing domestic film at the Japanese box office in 2012 and, as of January 5, 2015, is the 96th highest-grossing film in Japan, with ¥5.97 billion.
