= Bayside Shakedown =

1997 Japanese police television series

- Title screen
- Odoru Daisōsasen
- Genre: Police procedural Comedy drama
- Developed by: Ryoichi Kimizuka
- Starring: Yūji Oda; Toshirō Yanagiba; Eri Fukatsu; Chosuke Ikariya; Miki Mizuno; Yūsuke Santamaria
- Opening theme: Akihiko Matsumoto, "Rhythm And Police"
- Ending theme: Yūji Oda with Maxi Priest, "Love Somebody"
- Country of origin: Japan
- Original language: Japanese
- No. of seasons: 1
- No. of episodes: 11

Production
- Producer: Chihiro Kameyama
- Running time: 1 hour
- Production company: Fuji Television

Original release
- Network: FNS (Fuji TV)
- Release: 7 January – 18 March 1997

Related
- Bayside Shakedown: The Movie

Bayside Shakedown (踊る大捜査線, Odoru Daisōsasen) is a Japanese police comedy-drama television series originally broadcast by the Fuji Television group in 1997. The series was developed by Ryoichi Kimizuka and stars Oda Yūji, Toshirō Yanagiba, Eri Fukatsu, Chosuke Ikariya, Miki Mizuno, and Yūsuke Santamaria. In 1998 and 1999, an English-subtitled version of the series was broadcast in the United States on the International Channel, under the title The Spirited Criminal Investigative Network.

The series spawned three television films and a stage play, along with six theatrically released films that were produced following the end of the show. The first of the theatrical films, Bayside Shakedown, was released in 1998, and the sixth and final film, Bayside Shakedown The Final, was released in 2012. The first Bayside Shakedown film was a major box office hit in Japan, earning 10.1 billion yen (84 million U.S. dollars), and was the third highest grossing live-action film in Japanese box office history. The second film in the series, Bayside Shakedown 2, earned over $165 million at the box office, making it the highest-grossing live-action Japanese film on domestic screens.

== Plot ==
Bayside Shakedown takes place in the fictional Wangan Precinct of the Tokyo Metropolitan Police Department. Unlike most police dramas which tend to focus on action and car chases, Bayside Shakedown is largely concerned with the bureaucratic issues of the police department that are very present in many other sectors of Japanese society. The series depicted police work as office politics under a slightly different environment, complete with bureaucratic red tape, lethargic civil servants, bosses more interested in playing golf and saving face than solving crimes, interference from politicians, and conflict between police headquarters and the local officers.

The officers depicted in Bayside Shakedown are only permitted to carry firearms during major emergencies. Fuji TV used the fictional "All officers are to be armed" (拳銃携帯命令 Kenjū Keitai Meirei) order, which the portrayed bureaucracy is often reluctant to hand down. (In reality, it is compulsory for a uniformed officer to be armed, and plainclothes officers are required to be armed if they expect to be exposed to any danger.)

The main character of the series is a young detective named Shunsaku Aoshima (played by Oda Yūji). Originally a corporate personal computer salesman, Aoshima decided to join the police department out of heroic idealism, expecting a life of adventure and excitement. Once inside, he is completely underwhelmed by the reality of police work, finding it dishearteningly similar to corporate employment. Throughout the series, he strives against the obstacles of bureaucratic indifference to help people and pursue his ideals of what a police officer should be, often with humorous results.

== Cast ==
- Yūji Oda as Shunsaku Aoshima
- Toshirō Yanagiba as Shinji Muroi
- Eri Fukatsu as Sumire Onda
- Chosuke Ikariya as Heihachirō Waku
- Miki Mizuno as Yukino Kashiwagi
- Yūsuke Santamaria as Masayoshi Mashita
- Sōichirō Kitamura as Sōichirō Kanda
- Satoru Saitō as Harumi Akiyama
- Takehiko Ono as Kengo Hakamada
- Kenta Satoi as Jirō Uozumi
- Akira Hamada as Shimazu
- Shigemitsu Ogi as Masakazu Ichikura
- Yuki Uchida as Natsumi Shinohara

Guests

- Yoshimasa Kondo as Fumio Tanaka (episode 1)
- Toshihito Ito as Yamabe (episode 2)
- Ryoko Shinohara (episode 2)
- Katsuhiko Sasaki (episode 2)
- Asami Mizukawa as a middle school student (episode 3)
- Kee (episode 4)
- Hikaru Ijūin (episode 5)
- Tomoe Shinohara as Herself (episode 6)
- Claude Maki as Tatsumura (episodes 6 and 7)
- Yoshihiko Hakamada (episode 8)
- Sadao Abe (episode 9)
- Naoki Hosaka (episodes 10 and the final)
- Maxi Priest (episodes 10 and the final)
- Hiroshi Arikawa as the father of Masayoshi Mashita (the final episode)

== Timeline ==
1997 January–March: TV Drama.

1997 December: Special episode, Bayside Shakedown: Year-End Special Alert

1998 June: Extra episode, Bayside Shakedown: Wangan Police Station Female Police Officers' Story.

1998 October: Special episode, Bayside Shakedown: Autumn Campaign for Crime Eradication

1998 October: Bayside Shakedown: The Movie

2003 Summer: Bayside Shakedown 2.

2005 Summer: Two "spin-off" movies which are part of The Odoru Legend Continues. The first titled Tokyo Subway Panic (also known as Negotiator) was released in May. It is based on the character of Mashita as a police negotiator. The second movie The Suspect which was released in August is based on the character of Muroi. Another spin-off, Tobosha Joichiro Kijima was recorded for the DVD release of the Tokyo Subway Panic.

2010 Summer: Bayside Shakedown 3.

2012 September: The last TV special, Bayside Shakedown THE LAST TV Salaryman keiji to saigo no nanjiken. Some of the original cast members reunite after 14 years.

2012 September: The last movie for Bayside Shakedown which is Bayside Shakedown The Final.
