= Bayside Shakedown 3 =

- Film poster
- Kanji: 踊る大捜査線 THE MOVIE 3 ヤツらを解放せよ!
- Revised Hepburn: Odoru Daisōsasen The Movie 3: Yatsura o Kaihō Seyo!
- Directed by: Katsuyuki Motohiro
- Release date: July 3, 2010
- Running time: 141 minutes
- Country: Japan
- Language: Japanese
- Box office: ¥7.31 billion

Bayside Shakedown 3 (踊る大捜査線 THE MOVIE 3 ヤツらを解放せよ!, Odoru Daisōsasen za Mūbī Surī Yatsura o Kaihō Seyo!) is a 2010 Japanese action drama film directed by Katsuyuki Motohiro. It was released on July 3, 2010. It is the third film based on Bayside Shakedown TV series.

== Cast ==
- Yūji Oda as Shunsaku Aoshima
- Toshirō Yanagiba as Shinji Muroi
- Eri Fukatsu as Sumire Onda
- Yūsuke Santamaria as Masayoshi Mashita
- Atsushi Ito as Shinjiro Waku
- Yuki Uchida as Natsumi Shinohara
- Kotaro Koizumi as Shigeru Koike
- Shun Oguri as Seiichi Torikai
- Kyoko Koizumi as Manami Hinata

== Reception ==
The film was the third highest-grossing domestic film at the Japanese box office in 2010 and, as of January 5, 2015, is the 67th highest-grossing film in Japan, with ¥7.31 billion.
