= To Every You I've Loved Before and To Me, the One Who Loved You =

Japanese science fiction romance novels

- Covers of the novels To Every You I've Loved Before (left) and To Me, the One Who Loved You (right)

僕が愛したすべての君へ / 君を愛したひとりの僕へ (Boku ga Aishita Subete no Kimi e / Kimi o Aishita Hitori no Boku e)
- Genre: Drama, romance, science fiction
- Created by: Yomoji Otono
- Novel

To Every You I've Loved Before
- Written by: Yomoji Otono
- Published by: Hayakawa Publishing
- English publisher: NA: Seven Seas Entertainment
- Imprint: Hayakawa Bunko JA
- Published: June 23, 2016
- Novel

To Me, the One Who Loved You
- Written by: Yomoji Otono
- Published by: Hayakawa Publishing
- English publisher: NA: Seven Seas Entertainment
- Imprint: Hayakawa Bunko JA
- Published: June 23, 2016
- Anime films
- To Every You I've Loved Before (2022); To Me, the One Who Loved You (2022)

To Every You I've Loved Before (Note: Japanese: 僕が愛したすべての君へ, Hepburn: Boku ga Aishita Subete no Kimi e) and To Me, the One Who Loved You (Note: Japanese: 君を愛したひとりの僕へ, Hepburn: Kimi o Aishita Hitori no Boku e) are Japanese science fiction romance novels written and illustrated by Yomoji Otono, which were simultaneously released in Japan on June 23, 2016. A spin-off novel focusing on another version of Shiori Satō in another parallel world, titled Boku ga Kimi no Namae o Yobukara, (Note: Japanese: 僕が君の名前を呼ぶから; lit. 'Because I'm Calling Your Name') was released in Japan on August 10, 2022. Two anime films based on the novels were also simultaneously released in Japan on October 7, 2022. Seven Seas Entertainment released the English version of the novels in North America on June 6, 2023.

== Premise ==
The novels, which can be read in either order, are set in parallel worlds that are created as a result of Koyomi's decision from choosing between his mother Mayumi Takasaki and father Shodai Hidaka following their divorce. To Every You I've Loved Before follows Koyomi Takasaki meeting Kazune Takigawa, who introduces herself as his girlfriend in the 85th parallel world. To Me, the One Who Loved You follows Koyomi Hidaka and Shiori Satō eloping to a parallel world where they are not going to be stepsiblings after their parents were set to marry each other.

== Characters ==
=== To Every You I've Loved Before ===
Koyomi Takasaki (高崎暦, Takasaki Koyomi)
Voiced by: Hio Miyazawa
Kazune Takigawa (瀧川和音, Takigawa Kazune)
Voiced by: Ai Hashimoto

=== To Me, the One Who Loved You ===
Koyomi Hidaka (日高暦, Hidaka Koyomi)
Voiced by: Hio Miyazawa
Shiori Satō (佐藤栞, Satō Shiori)
Voiced by: Aju Makita

== Media ==
=== Novels ===
In May 2016, Yomoji Otono announced that his two new novels, To Every You I've Loved Before and To Me, the One Who Loved You, were set to be simultaneously released under the Hayakawa Bunko imprint on June 23. To Every You I've Loved Before was previously titled as Kimi no Inai Kōsaten (君のいない交差点; lit. 'The Intersection Without You'); it was then changed to Aisuruhito no Iru Sekai (愛する人のいる世界; lit. 'A World with a Loved One') before using the current title. To Me, the One Who Loved You was previously titled as Kimi no Iru Kōsaten (君のいる交差点; lit. 'The Intersection Where You Are'); it was then changed to Aisuruhito no Inai Sekai (愛する人のいない世界; lit. 'A World Without a Loved One') before using the current title. In July 2022, Seven Seas Entertainment licensed the two novels for English publication in North America.

==== Novel list ====
Novel	Original release date	Original ISBN	English release date	English ISBN
To Every You I've Loved Before	June 23, 2016	978-4-15-031233-6	June 6, 2023	978-1-68579-727-0
"Prologue... or Epilogue" (序章、 あるいは終章); 1. "Childhood" (幼年期); "Interlude" (幕間); 2. "Adolescence" (少年期); "Interlude" (幕間); 3. "Adulthood" (青年期); "Interlude" (幕間); 4. "Middle Age" (壮年期); "Interlude" (幕間); "Epilogue... or Prologue" (終章、 あるいは序章)
To Me, the One Who Loved You	June 23, 2016	978-4-15-031234-3	June 6, 2023	978-1-68579-728-7
"Prologue... or Epilogue" (序章、 あるいは終章); 1. "Childhood" (幼年期); "Interlude" (幕間); 2. "Adolescence, Part 1" (少年期、一); "Interlude" (幕間); 3. "Adolescence, Part 2" (少年期、二); "Interlude" (幕間); 4. "Adulthood and Middle Age" (青年期、壮年期); "Interlude" (幕間); "Epilogue... or Prologue" (終章、 あるいは序章); "Interlude" (幕間)

==== Spin-off ====
A spin-off novel by Otono, titled Boku ga Kimi no Namae o Yobu Kara (僕が君の名前を呼ぶから; lit. 'Because I'm Calling Your Name'), was released in Japan on August 10, 2022. It follows another version of Shiori Satō in another parallel world in which she begins to exchange diaries with her other self following her experience of Parallel Shift.

No.	Release date	ISBN
1	August 10, 2022	978-4-15-031525-2
"Shiori's Diary" (栞の日記); 1. "Childhood" (幼年期); "Shiori's Diary" (栞の日記); 2. "Adolescence" (少年期); "Shiori's Diary" (栞の日記); 3. "Adulthood" (青年期); "Interlude" (幕間); 4. "Old Age" (老年期); "Epilogue... or Somewhere in the World (終章、 あるいは世界のどこかで)

=== Anime films ===
The anime film adaptations of To Every You I've Loved Before and To Me, the One Who Loved You were announced on September 16, 2021. The To Every You I've Loved Before film was produced by Bakken Record and directed by Jun Matsumoto, while the To Me, the One Who Loved You film was produced by TMS Entertainment and directed by Ken'ichi Kasai. For both films, Riko Sakaguchi penned the script, Shimano is credited for character design concepts, and Takashi Ohmama composed the music. The theme song for To Every You I've Loved Before is "Kumo o Kō" performed by Keina Suda, while the theme song for To Me, the One Who Loved You is "Shion" performed by Saucy Dog. Both films premiered on October 7, 2022. Crunchyroll licensed both films outside of Asia.

== Reception ==
The novels have a cumulative 240,000 copies in print.
