= To Me, the One Who Loved You (film) =

2022 Japanese animated film by Kenichi Kasai

- Theatrical release poster
- Kanji: 君を愛したひとりの僕へ
- Revised Hepburn: Kimi o Aishita Hitori no Boku e
- Directed by: Kenichi Kasai
- Screenplay by: Riko Sakaguchi
- Based on: To Me, the One Who Loved You by Yomoji Otono
- Produced by: Yukari Tachibana; Tomoyuki Saito; Satoshi Kojima
- Starring: Hio Miyazawa; Aju Makita; Ai Hashimoto; Mutsumi Tamura; Kenji Hamada; Mie Sonozaki; Tomomichi Nishimura; Miki Mizuno; Kimiko Yo; Tokuma Nishioka
- Cinematography: Yūsaku Murakami
- Edited by: Keisuke Yanagi
- Music by: Takashi Ohmama
- Production company: TMS Entertainment (Note: Their in-house production studio 6th Studio handled the animation.)
- Distributed by: Toei Company
- Release dates: September 14, 2022 (Tokyo); October 7, 2022 (Japan)
- Running time: 98 minutes
- Country: Japan
- Language: Japanese
- Box office: US$1.66 million

To Me, the One Who Loved You (Japanese: 君を愛したひとりの僕へ, Hepburn: Kimi o Aishita Hitori no Boku e), often shortened to Kimiai (Japanese: 君愛), is a 2022 Japanese animated film based on the novel of the same name by Yomoji Otono. Produced by TMS Entertainment and distributed by Toei Company, the film is directed by Kenichi Kasai from a script written by Riko Sakaguchi and stars Hio Miyazawa, Aju Makita, Ai Hashimoto, Mutsumi Tamura, Kenji Hamada, Mie Sonozaki, Tomomichi Nishimura, Miki Mizuno, Kimiko Yo, and Tokuma Nishioka.

The film follows Koyomi Hidaka and Shiori Satō falling in love with each other, but their parents' remarriage has led them to elope to a parallel world where they are not stepsiblings. Its companion film, To Every You I've Loved Before, depicts an alternate version of Koyomi, named in that world as Koyomi Takasaki, meeting Kazune Takigawa, who introduces herself as his girlfriend in the 85th parallel world.

The anime film adaptation of one of Otono's novels was announced in September 2021. Kasai and Sakaguchi joined the staff of the film in May 2022. Miyazawa and Makita were revealed as the main cast in June 2022. Additional staff and cast were announced in August 2022.

To Me, the One Who Loved You had an early screening in Tokyo on September 14, 2022, and was released in Japan on October 7. The film grossed over US$1 million worldwide.

== Plot ==
In a parallel world, seven-year-old Koyomi chooses to live with his father Shodai Hidaka following his parents' divorce. At Imaginary Science Research Institute, Koyomi listens to his father explaining Imaginary Science, the study of parallel worlds, and Imaginality, the individual's consciousness that shifts between worlds called Parallel Shift. He is then informed that his grandfather's dog, Yuno, has died in an accident. Shiori Satō, daughter of the Institute's director Genko, finds him crying, so she brings him to an IP capsule that is capable of bringing an individual to parallel worlds. Koyomi shifts to a world where Yuno is alive but also where his grandfather has died. Returning to his original world, Koyomi learns that Shiori has helped him in exchange for his help in operating the capsule and sending her to a world where her parents are not divorced, but Genko stops them. Since then, Koyomi and Shiori become close friends as they grow up together.

Koyomi and Shiori are called up by their parents, whom they find discussing the Imaginary Elements Print (IP), a pattern that can determine how far an individual is from the parallel world they have arrived to their original one numerically, and the Optional Shift, a study on a forced Parallel Shift to a specified parallel world. Shodai and Genko stop their discussion to announce their marriage to each other. This causes uneasiness between Koyomi and Shiori, who both realize their love for each other, and they decide to do Parallel Shift to a world where they are not going to be stepsiblings. They successfully arrive in a world where their parents are not divorced, but Shiori dies after getting hit by a car at the Showa-dori intersection. Koyomi returns to the original world and finds Shiori unconscious. Shiori is proclaimed brain dead while her heart is kept beating artificially. Koyomi then finds Shiori's Imaginality in the form of a ghost at the intersection. Shodai and Genko explain that the time of death of the alternate Shiori's body and the time of shifting of the original Shiori's Imaginality back to the original world have overlapped, causing the latter's Imaginality to lose sight of her original body. Koyomi expresses his desire to save Shiori, so he helps in the experiments about Parallel Shift while keeping on attending high school.

At the Institute where he is now employed following his graduation, Koyomi learns that Shiori's heart has stopped working. Sometime later, Kazune Takigawa joins him as his assistant. After they visited a karaoke, Koyomi finds Kazune also capable of seeing Shiori's Imaginality at the intersection. Koyomi later reveals that he is researching the Time Shift to send Shiori to a world outside of her event radius, which refers to her accident. Kazune agrees to help with his research. A decade later, Imaginary Science has advanced significantly and the Optional Shift becomes a reality. Koyomi still fails to make the Time Shift possible but after hearing Kazune's mention of the buoyancy and viscosity of a beer, he takes these concepts to solve his research. Koyomi tells Kazune that he plans to shift Shiori back in time to a parallel world where they do not meet. He mentions that Shiori is entangled with him, so he will also do the Time Shift with her which will result in his brain death.

Decades later, old Koyomi prepares for the Time Shift with old Kazune, who has agreed with his plan despite showing hesitation in the past. Koyomi says goodbye to Shiori and explains that going back to a time when they go to their separate lives will help her get out of her event radius. He promises that they can meet again at the intersection on August 17 at 10 AM when they grow old. Kazune begins the Time Shift after hearing Koyomi's final goodbye. In a post-credits scene, old Koyomi Takasaki of a parallel world is encouraged by his wife Kazune to show up at the intersection. He later encounters old Shiori there and asks for her name.

== Voice cast ==
- Hio Miyazawa as Koyomi Hidaka
- Aju Makita as Shiori Satō
- Ai Hashimoto as Kazune Takigawa
- Mutsumi Tamura as young Koyomi
- Kenji Hamada as Shodai Hidaka
- Mie Sonozaki as Mayumi Takasaki
- Tomomichi Nishimura as Yasuhito Takasaki
- Momoko Noji as Satomi Takasaki
- Fumi Hirano
- Shinya Ishihara
- Ryota Akazawa
- Kyoko Chikiri
- Yuka Maihara
- Takehiro Urao
- Mirano Kambe
- Yuki Kyoka
- Ryōta Shinmei
- Miki Mizuno as Genko Satō
- Kimiko Yo as old Kazune
- Tokuma Nishioka as old Koyomi

== Production ==
An anime film adaptation of one of the two science fiction romance novels by Yomoji Otono, Kimi o Aishita Hitori no Boku e, was confirmed in September 2021. (Note: The English translations of the novel's title were first reported as To The Solitary Me That Loved You by Anime News Network and To the Only One Who Loved You, Me by Crunchyroll.) In May 2022, Kenichi Kasai was revealed to be directing the film at TMS Entertainment, with Riko Sakaguchi writing the script and Shimano conceiving the character designs. In June 2022, Hio Miyazawa, in his voice acting debut, and Aju Makita were revealed as the main characters Koyomi Hidaka and Shiori Satō, respectively; Miyazawa was also set to voice Koyomi Takasaki alongside Ai Hashimoto as Kazune Takigawa in the film's companion piece To Every You I've Loved Before. Mutsumi Tamura, Kenji Hamada, Mie Sonozaki, Tomomichi Nishimura, Miki Mizuno, Kimiko Yo, and Tokuma Nishioka were announced as part of the cast in August 2022. That month, other staff working on the film were also announced, including Kenzō Ishiguro for planning and production, Yukari Tachibana and Tomoyuki Saito as the producers, Shinichi Machida as the character designer, Yukari Takano, Erina Kojima, and Noriyasu Murata as the animation directors, Yasutada Kato as the art director, Yūsaku Murakami as the cinematographer, and Keisuke Yanagi as the film editor. TMS Entertainment's in-house production studio 6th Studio was credited for the film's animation production. In September 2022, vocalist Shinya Ishihara of the Japanese power trio band Saucy Dog was confirmed to be making a guest appearance in the film.

== Music ==
In August 2022, Takashi Ohmama was revealed to be composing To Me, the One Who Loved You, while Takuya Hiramitsu, head professor of the voice acting course at the Nagoya University of the Arts, was also revealed as the sound director. Additionally, Saucy Dog was announced to be performing the theme song "Shion" (紫苑; lit. 'Aster' or 'Tatarian Aster') for the film, which was written by Ishihara and composed by the band. In September 2022, Saucy Dog was also set to perform the insert song "Summer Daydream" (サマーデイドリーム, Samā Deidorīmu) for the film. "Shion" was released digitally in Japan on October 4, 2022, as well as the film's original soundtrack on October 7. The two songs are included in the 7th mini-album of Saucy Dog, which was released in Japan on July 19, 2023.

To Every You I've Loved Before / To Me, the One Who Loved You: Original Soundtrack track listing (Note: The soundtrack album contains music for the films To Me, the One Who Loved You and To Every You I've Loved Before. The remaining twenty-seven tracks are for To Me, the One Who Loved You.)
No.	Title	Length
21.	"Bokuai Epilogue ~To Every You~" (「僕愛」エピローグ 〜すべての君へ〜)	3:43
22.	"Kimiai Prologue" (「君愛」プロローグ)	1:12
23.	"First Choice" (最初の選択)	1:08
24.	"Turning Point" (分かれ道)	0:39
25.	"Encounter with Shiori" (栞との出会い)	1:47
26.	"Parallel Shift" (パラレルシフト)	0:35
27.	"A Farewell to Grandfather" (祖父との別れ)	1:14
28.	"Beyond Sorrow" (悲しみの先に)	1:08
29.	"Summer Adventure" (夏の冒険)	1:26
30.	"After a Spirit of Adventure" (冒険心の末に)	1:23
31.	"Hope for Two" (ふたりの希望)	0:31
32.	"The Future of the Two" (ふたりの行く末)	0:52
33.	"State of Emergency" (緊急事態)	0:26
34.	"Clueless" (茫然)	0:56
35.	"Sadness with No Place to Go" (行き場のない悲しみ)	1:46
36.	"Determination for the Future" (未来への決意)	1:57
37.	"Reality or Dream" (現実か夢か)	0:54
38.	"Loss of Hope" (希望の喪失)	1:49
39.	"Classmate" (同級生)	2:09
40.	"Accomplice" (共犯者)	1:30
41.	"Thoughts of the Two" (ふたりの想い)	1:20
42.	"Daily Reminiscences" (日常の回想)	1:23
43.	"Emotions" (喜怒哀楽)	2:07
44.	"Koyomi's Resolution and Determination" (暦の覚悟と決意)	1:11
45.	"Kazune's Sadness" (和音の切なさ)	0:48
46.	"Promise" (約束)	2:32
47.	"Kimiai Epilogue ~Reunion~" (「君愛」エピローグ 〜再会〜)	0:55

== Marketing ==
The project visual and promotional video for To Me, the One Who Loved You and To Every You I've Loved Before were released in May 2022. The teaser poster and trailer for To Me, the One Who Loved You were released in June 2022. In August 2022, the main trailer for the film was released, as well as its main poster a few days later. That month, the film was included in the benefits of premium users of au Smart Pass, where they could watch a work at theaters for ¥1,100. In October 2022, Japanese jewelry store Ahkah announced a collaboration with the film to produce the aquamarine engagement ring that was seen in the film, which would be sold as la vérité ("the truth" in French) aquamarine ring.

== Release ==
=== Theatrical ===
300 individuals had been invited for the early screening of To Me, the One Who Loved You at Marunouchi Toei theater in Tokyo on September 14, 2022. The film was released in Japan on October 7, 2022, concurrently with To Every You I've Loved Before. Otono commented that the filmgoers could choose which of the two films would they watch first, stating that "the order in which they are seen will greatly affect the way you feel about them." The two films were screened consecutively, with To Every You I've Loved Before as the first film in chronological order as a result of online voting, at Marunouchi Toei theater on October 15, 2022. The barrier-free screening of To Me, the One Who Loved You, which included an audio description for the blind and visually impaired filmgoers and closed captioning with Japanese subtitles for the deaf and hard of hearing filmgoers, began on October 21, 2022. Crunchyroll held the North American premiere of the film at Sakura-Con in Seattle, Washington on April 7, 2023.

=== Home media ===
To Me, the One Who Loved You was released digitally on March 11, 2023, and on Blu-ray and DVD in Japan on March 24. Crunchyroll began streaming the film in North America, Central America, South America, Europe, Africa, Oceania, the Commonwealth of Independent States, and India on April 20, 2023. They also released it on Blu-ray in North America on December 3, 2024.

== Reception ==
=== Box office ===
To Me, the One Who Loved You grossed ¥210 million (US$1.6 million) in Japan and US$61,178 in Vietnam, for a worldwide total of US$1.66 million. In its opening weekend, the film debuted ninth at the box office ranking in Japan.

=== Critical response ===
The Japanese review and survey firm Filmarks placed To Me, the One Who Loved You fifth in their first-day satisfaction ranking, with an average rating of 3.55/5, based on 295 reviews.

Daryl Harding at Crunchyroll felt the film could be a standalone film, stating that "nothing is missing in this package of a film", and lauded the character designs that he found was "very reminiscent of Detective Conan" and the narrative that "spills over to some great characterization." However, he criticized the visuals and voice acting, particularly Hio Miyazawa whom he found his voice acting sounding "like he didn't want to be there at all." MrAJCosplay at Anime News Network found the film better than to its companion piece in giving "explanations and expository scenes" due to fact that it focused about parallel universes. They lauded how the first thirty minutes of the film gave a focus on the romance of the main cast, while the final two-thirds of the runtime were "far more plot-driven." However, they found the film's ending "underwhelming" without watching its companion film.
