= Kenji Hamada =

Japanese voice actor (born 1972)

- 浜田 賢二
- Born: April 12, 1972 (age 54); Fukuoka, Japan
- Occupation: Voice actor
- Years active: 1998–present
- Agent: Mausu Promotion
- Notable credit(s): Kuroko's Basketball as Teppei Kiyoshi, World Trigger as Haruaki Azuma
- Spouse: Junko Takeuchi (m. 2006)
- Children: 2

Kenji Hamada (浜田 賢二, Hamada Kenji; born April 12, 1972) is a Japanese voice actor from Fukuoka, Japan who is an affiliate of Mausu Promotion. On adult works, he goes under the alias of Ken Akiresu (安芸怜須 ケン, Akiresu Ken).

== Personal life ==
In 1996, Hamada enrolled at Ezaki Production school. Since 1998, he has been affiliated with Mausu Promotion. He has admitted that he has been a heavy smoker since high school, but as of 2014 he has quit smoking.

Hamada has been married to fellow voice actress Junko Takeuchi since 2006 with whom he has two children.

== Filmography ==
=== Television animation ===
1998

- Fancy Lala – Nishiyama

1999

- Devil Lady – Arito
- Dual! Parallel Trouble Adventure – Toshihiko Izawa

2000

- Saiyuki – Silver-haired Demon

2001

- Geneshaft – Mario Musicanova
- Star Ocean EX – "La"

2002

- Aquarian Age: Sign for Evolution – Akane's Manager (ep 7)
- Duel Masters – Kirifuda's Father
- Heat Guy J – Blood

2003

- Gungrave – Harry MacDowel (Teen)
- Green Green – Taizou Tenjin
- Mujin Wakusei Survive – Luna's Father

2004

- Uta∽Kata – Masahito Tachibana
- Dan Doh!! – Owner
- Tenjho Tenge – Tsutomu Ryuuzaki
- Naruto – Shibi Aburame (ep 79)
- Daphne in the Brilliant Blue – Trevor

2005

- Agatha Christie no Meitantei Poirot to Marple – Inspector Craddock (ep 23)
- Eyeshield 21 – Ichiro Takami
- Gallery Fake – Parker (ep 37), Winston (ep 6)
- Guyver: The Bioboosted Armor – Noskov
- Onegai My Melody – Papa
- Zettai Shonen – Akiyuki Kishiro
- Naruto – Fugaku Uchiha
- Honey and Clover – Takumi Nomiya
- Paradise Kiss – Jouji "George" Koizumi
- Lamune – Tae's Father

2006

- Kiba – Miguel
- Gin-iro no Olynssis – Mason
- Gintama – Kitaouji Itsuki
- Ghost Hunt – Hōshō Takigawa
- Sasami: Magical Girls Club – Ginji Iwakura
- Le Chevalier D'Eon – Bernice
- Ghost Slayers Ayashi – Masahiro Abe
- Tokyo Tribe 2 – Ago, Kai's Father (ep 1)
- NANA – Mizukoshi
- Honey and Clover II – Takumi Nomiya
- Pumpkin Scissors – Ian (ep 7)
- Mushi-Shi – Taku (Older)
- Yume Tsukai – Mizuki Fuyumura (ep 7)
- Megaman Star Force – Michinori Ikuta

2007

- Ef a tale of memories – Shūichi Kuze
- Kishin Taisen Gigantic Formula – Yashichi Yanagisawa
- Mobile Suit Gundam 00 – Patrick Colasour, Commander Kim (ep 4)
- Claymore – Dauf, Man in Black
- Shigurui: Death Frenzy – Iemon Shigaraki
- Hayate the Combat Butler – Hayate's Father
- Harukanaru Toki no Naka de 3: Kurenai no Tsuki – Taira no Tomomori
- Buso Renkin – Shinobu Negoro
- Potemayo – Kōdai Moriyama
- Mushi-Uta – Kabuto

2008

- Real Drive – Yuujin
- Ef a tale of melodies – Shūichi Kuze
- Chaos;HEAd – Issei Hatano
- Mobile Suit Gundam 00 Second Season – Patrick Colasour, Commander Kim
- Gegege no Kitarō – Higomo (ep 74), Tsuki (ep 49)
- Skip Beat! – Takenori Sawara
- Birdy the Mighty: Decode – Kashu Geeze
- Natsume's Book of Friends – Adult Akifumi Sugino
- Chiko, Heiress of the Phantom Thief – Akechi (ep 3)
- Top Secret ~The Revelation~ – Takashi Soga

2009

- Sweet Blue Flowers – Masanori Kakumu
- Slap Up Party: Arad Senki – Aganzo
- CANAAN – Minoru Minorikawa
- Guin Saga – Taeron
- Kurokami The Animation – Hiyou
- Cross Game – Tadashi Shimano
- Gegege no Kitarō – Senior Tanaka (ep 91)
- Hell Girl: Three Vessels – Ashiya Risaburo (Teen, ep 17)
- 07-Ghost – Hyuuga
- Shangri-La – Karin's Father
- The Book of Bantorra – Zatoh Rondohoon
- Tears to Tiara – Gaius
- Naruto: Shippuden – Fugaku Uchiha
- Fullmetal Alchemist: Brotherhood – Vato Falman, Barry the Chopper (real body)
- Basquash! – James Ron
- Bleach – Hyorinmaru
- Modern Magic Made Simple – Gary Huang
- One Piece – Killer

2010

- The Betrayal Knows My Name – Fuyutoki Kureha
- Ookiku Furikabutte ~Natsu no Taikai-hen~ – Roka Nakazawa
- High School of the Dead – Matsuo
- Psychic Detective Yakumo – Shunsuke Takeda
- Stitch! – Clyde
- The Qwaser of Stigmata – Wang Chen
- Dance in the Vampire Bund – Rozenmann
- Naruto Shippuden – Shibi Aburame
- Fullmetal Alchemist: Brotherhood – Bliss
- Bakuman. – Tarō Kawaguchi
- Battle Spirits: Brave – The Hooligan General Duc
- Harukanaru Toki no Naka de 3: Owari Naki Unmei – Shirogane, Tomomori Taira
- One Piece – Inazuma (Male)

2011

- Heaven's Memo Pad – Masaya Kusakabe
- Shakugan no Shana III – Ernest Frieder
- The Qwaser of Stigmata II – Wan Chen
- Chihayafuru – Kenji Ayase
- Bakuman. 2 – Tarō Kawaguchi
- Hanasaku Iroha – Enishi Shijima
- Manyū Hiken-chō – Muneyuki Manyū
- Un-Go – Yasuo Saburi
- One Piece – Atmos

2012

- Initial D: Fifth Stage – Kobayakawa
- The Ambition of Oda Nobuna – Sugitani Zenjuubou
- Cardfight!! Vanguard: Asia Circuit Hen – Brutal Jack
- Mobile Suit Gundam AGE – Andy Draims
- Kingdom – Feng Ji
- Kuroko's Basketball – Teppei Kiyoshi
- Sakamichi no Apollon – Yurika's Father
- Tari Tari – Keisuke Sakai
- Muv-Luv Alternative: Total Eclipse – Valerio Giacosa
- Pokémon: Black and White – Fujio
- Rinne no Lagrange – Hiroshi Nakaizumi

2013

- Sunday Without God – Lex
- Galilei Donna – Hans
- Gifū Dōdō!! Kanetsugu to Keiji – Shima Sakon
- Genshiken: Second Generation – Yuichiro Hato
- Chihayafuru 2 – Kenji Ayase
- Toriko – Zaus
- Namiuchigiwa no Muromi-san – Kawabata-kun
- Bakuman. 3 – Tarō Kawaguchi
- Hunter × Hunter (2011) – Bara, Kess
- Pokémon XY – Barry
- Yu-Gi-Oh! Zexal II – Eliphas
- Little Busters! – Shō Saigusa
- Ro-Kyu-Bu! SS – Banri Kashii

2014

- Oneechan ga Kita – Masaya Mizuhara
- Girl Friend BETA – Serge Jean Lemaire
- Aikatsu! - Sergeant Pepper
- The Kindaichi Case Files Returns – Ryuuta Takigawa/Wang Long Tai
- Gekkan Shōjo Nozaki-kun – John
- Battle Spirits Saikyō Ginga Ultimate Zero – Ultimate-Beelzebeat
- Black Butler: Book of Circus – Diederich
- Argevollen – Lorenz Giuliano
- Shirobako – Masashi Yamada
- Nobunaga Concerto – Saito Yoshitatsu
- HappinessCharge PreCure! – Madam Momere
- Ping Pong – Masayuki Sanada
- The Irregular at Magic High School – Kotaro Tatsumi
- Lord Marksman and Vanadis – Steed
- Your Lie in April – Takahiko Arima

2015

- Magic Kaito 1412 – Jack Connery
- World Trigger – Haruaki Azuma
- Kuroko's Basketball – Teppei Kiyoshi
- Gangsta – Hausen
- Comet Lucifer – Gus Stewart

2016

- JoJo's Bizarre Adventure: Diamond Is Unbreakable – Anjuro "Angelo" Katagiri
- Tōken Ranbu: Hanamaru – Otegine (ep 7-)
- Norn9 – Shiro Yuiga
- BBK/BRNK – Yūki Nono
- Boku Dake ga Inai Machi – Kitamura
- 91 Days – Tigre
- Taboo Tattoo – Johnson

2017

- Onihei – Yūsuke Sakai
- Hell Girl: Fourth Twilight – Kazuomi Kogure
- A Centaur's Life – Sōta Kimihara
- Alice & Zōroku – Kirk Herschel
- Super Lovers 2 – Kazushi Mori
- In Another World With My Smartphone – Baba Nobuharu
- Idol Incidents – Togiria
- Tomica Hyper Rescue Drive Head Kidō Kyūkyū Keisatsu – Jō Kurumada

2018

- Hakata Tonkotsu Ramens - Shigematsu
- Gundam Build Divers - Patrick Colasour (ep. 11)

2019

- Attack on Titan Season 3 Part 2 - Tom Ksaver
- Cop Craft - Jack Roth

2020

- In/Spectre - Tokunosuke Terada
- Healin' Good Pretty Cure - Kyosei Maruyama
- The God of High School - Commissioner Q

2021

- Odd Taxi - Dob
- Seirei Gensouki: Spirit Chronicles - Alfred Emerle
- Platinum End - Mirai's Father

2022

- Salaryman's Club - Hajime Masatoki
- Spriggan - Yamamoto
- I've Somehow Gotten Stronger When I Improved My Farm-Related Skills - Gilles Wayne

2023

- Chillin' in My 30s After Getting Fired from the Demon King's Army - Enbil
- Ragna Crimson - Christopher Algren

2024

- Tonari no Yōkai-san - Taichi Tanaka
- Fairy Tail: 100 Years Quest - Skullion
- Blue Miburo - Fujita

2025

- Übel Blatt - Rozen
- Grisaia: Phantom Trigger the Animation - Enishi Urushihara

2026

- A Gentle Noble's Vacation Recommendation - Insy

=== Films ===
- Sing a Bit of Harmony (2021) - Nomiyama
- To Every You I've Loved Before (2022)
- To Me, the One Who Loved You (2022)

=== Original video animation (OVA) ===
- Deadman Wonderland (2011) - Ikazuchi Akatsuki
- Shirobako (2015) – Lye (ep 2)
- The Kubikiri Cycle (2016) – Shinya Sakaki
- Moriarty the Patriot (2022) – Baron George Cubid

=== Original net animation (ONA) ===
- Sword Gai: The Animation (2018) - Tatsumi
- Onmyōji (2023) – Imperial Prince Atsumi

=== Drama CDs ===
- Etrian Odyssey – Alan/Protector #3
- Honey Boys Spiral – Tsukasa Kozuki
- Koi Made Hyakurin – Toraji Oyama
- Saudade – Leon Canales Serrano
- Magical Girl Lyrical Nanoha INNOCENT - Granz Florian

=== Tokusatsu ===
- Tokusou Sentai Dekaranger – Dynamoian Terry X (ep. 47)
- GoGo Sentai Boukenger – Hyouga (ep. 17)
- Engine Sentai Go-onger – Engine Gunpherd (eps. 3 - 47, 49)
- Engine Sentai Go-onger: Boom Boom! Bang Bang! GekijōBang!! – Engine Gunpherd
- Engine Sentai Go-onger vs. Gekiranger – Engine Gunpherd
- Samurai Sentai Shinkenger vs. Go-onger: GinmakuBang!! – Engine Gunpherd
- Kamen Rider × Kamen Rider OOO & W Featuring Skull: Movie War Core – Kyoryu Greeed
- Kamen Rider × Kamen Rider Fourze & OOO: Movie War Mega Max – Kamen Rider Poseidon
- Unofficial Sentai Akibaranger – Shibuya Seitakaawadachisohigenagaaburamushi (ep. 1), Shibuya Kouzorinahigenagaaburamushi (ep. 2)
- Ressha Sentai ToQger – Seal Shadow (ep. 7)
- Shuriken Sentai Ninninger – Puppet Ninja Kuroari (ep. 30)
- Uchu Sentai Kyuranger – Southern King (ep. 41)

=== Video games ===
- Collar x Malice - Tomoki Ogata
- Dynasty Warriors 9 - Xun You
- Final Fantasy XIV - Estinien Wyrmblood
- Fire Emblem: Three Houses - Hanneman von Essar
- Lost Judgment - Daimu Akutsu
- Majogami - Shiori
- Reijou Tantei Office no Jikenbo - Sagami Sou
- Soul Hackers 2 - Raven
- Star Ocean: Second Evolution - Metatron
- Star Ocean: The Second Story R - Metatron
- Street Fighter 6 - Dee Jay
- Super Street Fighter IV - Dee Jay
- Tales of Symphonia: Dawn of the New World - Richter Abend
- Trails in the Sky 1st Chapter - Cassius Bright
- Warriors Orochi 3 - Susano'o
- Warriors Orochi 4 - Susano'o
- Yakuza 5 - Yahata
- Zenless Zone Zero - Ben Bigger

=== Dubbing ===
==== Live-action ====
- Paul Rudd
  - The 40-Year-Old Virgin – David
  - Knocked Up – Pete
  - Forgetting Sarah Marshall – Chuck / Kunu
  - This Is 40 – Pete
- 200 Cigarettes – Elvis Costello
- 20,000 Leagues Under the Sea – Pierre Arronax (Patrick Dempsey)
- Agatha Christie's Poirot – Oliver Manders (Tom Wisdom)
- Aliens in the Attic – Jake Pearson (Austin Butler)
- American Pie film series – Chuck "Sherminator" Sherman (Chris Owen)
- Armageddon – NASA Tech (Matt Malloy)
- Bicentennial Man – Lloyd Charney (Bradley Whitford)
- Black Cadillac – Scott (Shane Johnson)
- Body of Proof – Tom Parker (Stephen Barker Turner)
- Bohemian Rhapsody – Kenny Everett (Dickie Beau)
- The Boondock Saints – Officer Chaffey
- Borderlands – Krieg (Florian Munteanu)
- The Brothers Bloom – Bloom (Adrien Brody)
- Daredevil – James Wesley (Toby Leonard Moore)
- Dark Angel – Zack (William Gregory Lee)
- Deadpool – Francis Freeman/Ajax (Ed Skrein)
- Diana – Jason Fraser
- Dr. Dolittle 2 (2005 TV Tokyo edition) – Eric (Lil Zane)
- Enemy of the State (2003 Fuji TV edition) – Jamie Williams (Jamie Kennedy)
- Frank of Ireland – Peter-Brian (Tom Vaughan-Lawlor)
- A Good Man – Sasha (Victor Webster)
- The Grand Budapest Hotel – Dmitri Desgoffe und Taxis (Adrien Brody), Young Writer (Jude Law)
- The Grey – John Diaz (Frank Grillo)
- Instinct – Julian Cousins (Naveen Andrews)
- Jakob the Liar – Preuss (Justus von Dohnányi)
- Just Go with It – Ian Maxtone-Jones (Dave Matthews)
- Kissing Jessica Stein – Greg (Michael Ealy)
- LAX – Tony Magulia (Paul Leyden)
- Legally Blonde – Warner Huntington III (Matthew Davis)
- Legally Blondes – Mr. Richard Woods (Christopher Cousins)
- Limitless – Edward "Eddie" Morra (Bradley Cooper)
- Love and Other Disasters – Hollywood Paolo (Santiago Cabrera)
- Magnolia – Todd Geronimo (Patrick Warren)
- The Martian – Dr. Chris Beck (Sebastian Stan)
- Northmen: A Viking Saga – Asbjörn (Tom Hopper)
- Octane – The Father (Jonathan Rhys Meyers)
- One Night Stand – Nathan
- Overlord – Corporal Lewis Ford (Wyatt Russell)
- The Pink Panther – Bizu (William Abadie)
- Platoon (2003 TV Tokyo edition) – Crawford (Chris Pedersen)
- Poseidon – Marco Valentin (Freddy Rodriguez)
- Prozac Nation – Noah (Jonathan Rhys Meyers)
- Saving Private Ryan – Paratrooper Joe (Nick Brooks)
- The Skulls – Will Beckford (Hill Harper)
- Spin City – James Hobert (Alexander Chaplin)
- Star Trek: Enterprise – Travis Mayweather (Anthony Montgomery)
- The Suspect (Warner Bros Japan) – Ji Dong-chul (Gong Yoo)
- Thanks of a Grateful Nation – Chris Small (Matt Keeslar)
- Tigerland – Barnes
- Universal Soldier III: Unfinished Business – Charles Clifton (Juan Chioran)
- Urban Legends: Final Cut – Rob (Yani Gellman)
- Velvet Goldmine – Freddi (David Hoyle)
- Wishcraft – Brett Bumpers (Michael Weston)

==== Animation ====
- The Batman – Rumor
- Cybersix – Techno
- Waking Life – Jesse
