= To Every You I've Loved Before (film) =

2022 Japanese animated film by Jun Matsumoto

- Theatrical release poster
- Kanji: 僕が愛したすべての君へ
- Revised Hepburn: Boku ga Aishita Subete no Kimi e
- Directed by: Jun Matsumoto
- Screenplay by: Riko Sakaguchi
- Based on: To Every You I've Loved Before by Yomoji Otono
- Produced by: Yukari Tachibana; Tomoyuki Saito
- Starring: Hio Miyazawa; Ai Hashimoto; Aju Makita; Mutsumi Tamura; Kenji Hamada; Mie Sonozaki; Tomomichi Nishimura; Fumi Hirano; Miki Mizuno; Kimiko Yo; Tokuma Nishioka
- Cinematography: Yohei Konishi
- Edited by: Masaki Sakamoto
- Music by: Takashi Ohmama
- Production company: Bakken Record
- Distributed by: Toei Company
- Release dates: September 14, 2022 (Tokyo); October 7, 2022 (Japan)
- Running time: 102 minutes
- Country: Japan
- Language: Japanese
- Box office: US$1.58 million

To Every You I've Loved Before (Japanese: 僕が愛したすべての君へ, Hepburn: Boku ga Aishita Subete no Kimi e), often shortened to Bokuai (Japanese: 僕愛), is a 2022 Japanese animated film based on the novel of the same name by Yomoji Otono. Produced by Bakken Record and distributed by Toei Company, the film is directed by Jun Matsumoto from a script written by Riko Sakaguchi and stars Hio Miyazawa, Ai Hashimoto, Aju Makita, Mutsumi Tamura, Kenji Hamada, Mie Sonozaki, Tomomichi Nishimura, Fumi Hirano, Miki Mizuno, Kimiko Yo, and Tokuma Nishioka.

The film follows high-school student Koyomi Takasaki meeting Kazune Takigawa, who reveals to him that he is her boyfriend in the 85th parallel world. Its companion film, To Me, the One Who Loved You, depicts an alternate version of Koyomi, named in that world as Koyomi Hidaka, and Shiori Satō who both fall in love with each other, but their parents' remarriage has led them to elope to another parallel world where they are not stepsiblings.

The anime film adaptation of one of Otono's novels was announced in September 2021. Matsumoto and Sakaguchi joined the staff of the film in May 2022. Miyazawa and Hashimoto were revealed as the main cast in June 2022. Additional staff and cast were announced in August 2022.

To Every You I've Loved Before had an early screening in Tokyo on September 14, 2022, and was released in Japan on October 7. The film grossed over US$1 million worldwide.

== Plot ==
Old Koyomi Takasaki notices a note from his IP device informing him about a meet-up at 10 AM today, August 17, but he cannot recall it. After being encouraged by his wife Kazune to show up at the meeting place, Koyomi arrives at the Showa-dori intersection and meets the ghost form of Shiori Satō's Imaginality, her consciousness, who is waiting for him. After she disappeared, Koyomi deduces that a shift to a parallel world, called Parallel Shift, has taken place, but his IP device shows an error message upon checking it to determine how far he is from the original world.

In a parallel world, seven-year-old Koyomi chooses to live with his mother Mayumi Takasaki after his parents got divorced. Following the death of his grandfather, Koyomi walks his dog Yuno outside when he suddenly experiences a Parallel Shift. He encounters young Shiori who then runs away and finds himself at Imaginary Science Research Institute where his father works. Arriving at his mother's house, Koyomi realizes that he is in a different world where he has chosen to live with his father, his grandfather is alive, and Yuno has died. After staying for a night, Koyomi returns to his original world.

Now a high school student, Koyomi is approached by his classmate Kazune Takigawa, who introduces herself as his girlfriend in the 85th parallel world. Kazune reveals that she has not felt a Parallel Shift taking place despite her IP device reading her world is 85 shifts away. They decide to continue their everyday lives on their own. Sometime later, Koyomi greets Kazune with her first name but gets ignored instead, resulting in him believing that the Kazune of the 85th parallel world has returned home. Koyomi invites the original Kazune to a karaoke to learn about her experience when she was in the 85th parallel world, but Kazune reveals that she has pranked him about being his girlfriend and her shifting to the other world as payback for making her speak at their school's opening ceremony instead of him. Since then, Koyomi and Kazune become friends, with her rejecting him during his confessions. After graduating and enrolling at the same university, Kazune asks Koyomi to be his girlfriend. Afterward, the two join the Institute and help in improving the reliability of IP devices.

Koyomi and Kazune get married and have a son named Ryō. An attacker causes havoc at the exhibition that the Takasaki family is visiting, but Koyomi manages to save Kazune and Ryō from the attack. Going back to work, Koyomi learns that an Optional Shift, a forced Parallel Shift to a specified parallel world, targeting Kazune has taken place. It is revealed that his Kazune has shifted to another world and the current one is from the 13th parallel world where her son has died from the attack. That Kazune returns to her world after coming to terms with her son's death, but Koyomi's Kazune is no longer "numerically" the original one due to identity diffusion. Despite all that, their love continues until their old age.

Old Kazune Takigawa from the parallel world where she and Koyomi, named there as Koyomi Hidaka, are not married initiates an Optional Shift to the old Kazune of this world to write a letter asking her to send her husband to the intersection to fulfill Hidaka's wish of meeting with Shiori again at the same place. Takigawa reveals that Hidaka has just gone through Time Shift and his Imaginality resides in her husband's consciousness. Back at the intersection, old Koyomi encounters old Shiori, both are not recognizing each other, and he hears that she is living a happy life. Koyomi returns home and shows Kazune his gratitude for making his life happy.

== Voice cast ==
- Hio Miyazawa as Koyomi Takasaki
- Ai Hashimoto as Kazune Takigawa
- Aju Makita as Shiori Satō
- Mutsumi Tamura as young Koyomi
- Kenji Hamada as Shodai Hidaka
- Mie Sonozaki as Mayumi Takasaki
- Hitomi Sasaki as Ai Takasaki
- Tomomichi Nishimura as Yasuhito Takasaki
- Momoko Noji as Satomi Takasaki
- Kokoro Kikuchi as Ryō Takasaki
- Fumi Hirano
- Keina Suda as Kosugi
- Daisuke Namikawa
- Hiroyuki Yoshino
- Ikuji Nose
- Hiromichi Tezuka
- Wakana Kowaka
- Fumitake Ishiguro
- Miki Mizuno as Genko Satō
- Kimiko Yo as old Kazune
- Tokuma Nishioka as old Koyomi

== Production ==
An anime film adaptation of one of the two science fiction romance novels by Yomoji Otono, Boku ga Aishita Subete no Kimi e, was confirmed in September 2021. (Note: The English translations of the novel's title were first reported as To Every You I've Loved Before by Anime News Network and To All of You That I Loved by Crunchyroll.) In May 2022, Jun Matsumoto was revealed to be directing the film at Bakken Record, with Riko Sakaguchi writing the script and Shimano conceiving the character designs. In June 2022, Hio Miyazawa, in his voice acting debut, and Ai Hashimoto were revealed as the main characters Koyomi Takasaki and Kazune Takigawa, respectively; Miyazawa was also set to voice Koyomi Hidaka alongside Aju Makita as Shiori Satō in the film's companion piece To Me, the One Who Loved You. Mutsumi Tamura, Kenji Hamada, Mie Sonozaki, Tomomichi Nishimura, Fumi Hirano, Miki Mizuno, Kimiko Yo, and Tokuma Nishioka were announced as part of the cast in August 2022. That month, other staff working on the film were also announced, including Kenzō Ishiguro for planning and production, Yukari Tachibana and Tomoyuki Saito as the producers, Keiichi Kondō, Rika Sasaki, and Kano Komiyama as the character designers, Kenji Fujisaki, Yumiko Ōmae, and Kenji Shibata as the animation directors, Yukari Yasuda as the art director, Yohei Konishi as the cinematographer, and Masaki Sakamoto as the film editor. In September 2022, Japanese musician Keina Suda was confirmed to be making a guest appearance in the film.

== Music ==
In August 2022, Takashi Ohmama was revealed to be composing To Every You I've Loved Before. Additionally, Suda was announced to be performing the theme song "Kumo wo Kō" (雲を恋う; lit. 'Love the Clouds') for the film, which he also written and composed. The title was based on the old idiom "Rōchō Kumo wo Kō" (籠鳥雲を恋う), meaning "a bird in a basket pining for the clouds in the sky", with Suda explaining that it reflected how Koyomi "yearns for freedom from a state of captivity". Suda was confirmed in September 2022 to be performing the insert song "Rakka Ryūsui" (落花流水; lit. 'Mutual Love') for the film, which was also based on the idiom of the same name. The two songs and the film's original soundtrack were released digitally in Japan on October 7, 2022.

To Every You I've Loved Before / To Me, the One Who Loved You: Original Soundtrack track listing (Note: The soundtrack album contains music for the films To Every You I've Loved Before and To Me, the One Who Loved You. The first twenty tracks are for To Every You I've Loved Before.)
No.	Title	Length
1.	"A Space for Two" (ふたりの空間)	0:51
2.	"Bokuai Opening Theme" (「僕愛」オープニングテーマ)	0:31
3.	"The Way ~Beginning~" (道 〜はじまり〜)	2:37
4.	"Encounter" (出会い)	1:29
5.	"Kinds of Kindness" (優しさの種類)	3:21
6.	"The Way ~Awareness~" (道 〜気づき〜)	2:01
7.	"Consideration" (考察)	2:03
8.	"The Entrance to First Love" (初恋の入り口)	2:55
9.	"In the Middle of Love" (恋の途中)	1:10
10.	"A New Beginning" (新たな始まり)	2:19
11.	"Change ~School Life~" (変化 〜学校生活〜)	2:08
12.	"Change ~Afterwards~" (変化〜その後〜)	0:50
13.	"A World Bound Together" (結ばれる世界)	1:15
14.	"Outbreak" (勃発)	1:15
15.	"Chasing" (追走)	3:05
16.	"Ideal and Reality ~What Is the World of 0?~" (理想と現実 〜0の世界とは〜)	4:48
17.	"Road ~Each Love~" (道 〜それぞれの愛〜)	4:08
18.	"Road ~Letter from Kazune~" (道 〜和音からの手紙〜)	1:58
19.	"Road ~Meeting~" (道 〜待ち合わせ〜)	0:49
20.	"Shiori's Theme" (栞のテーマ)	2:34

== Marketing ==
The project visual and promotional video for To Every You I've Loved Before and To Me, the One Who Loved You were released in May 2022. The teaser poster and trailer for To Every You I've Loved Before were released in June 2022. In August 2022, the main trailer for the film was released, as well as its main poster a few days later. That month, the film was included in the benefits of premium users of au Smart Pass, where they could watch a work at theaters for ¥1,100. In October 2022, Japanese jewelry store Ahkah announced a collaboration with the film to produce the aquamarine engagement ring that was seen in the film, which would be sold as la vérité ("the truth" in French) aquamarine ring.

== Release ==
=== Theatrical ===
300 individuals had been invited for the early screening of To Every You I've Loved Before at Marunouchi Toei theater in Tokyo on September 14, 2022. The film was released in Japan on October 7, 2022, concurrently with To Me, the One Who Loved You. Otono commented that the filmgoers could choose which of the two films would they watch first, stating that "the order in which they are seen will greatly affect the way you feel about them". The two films were screened consecutively, with To Every You I've Loved Before as the first film in chronological order as a result of online voting, at Marunouchi Toei theater on October 15, 2022. The barrier-free screening of To Every You I've Loved Before, which included an audio description for the blind and visually impaired filmgoers and closed captioning with Japanese subtitles for the deaf and hard of hearing filmgoers, began on October 21, 2022. Crunchyroll held the North American premiere of the film at Sakura-Con in Seattle, Washington on April 7, 2023.

=== Home media ===
To Every You I've Loved Before was released digitally on March 11, 2023, and on Blu-ray and DVD in Japan on March 24. Crunchyroll began streaming the film in North America, Central America, South America, Europe, Africa, Oceania, the Commonwealth of Independent States, and India on April 20, 2023. They also released it on Blu-ray in North America on December 3, 2024.

== Reception ==
=== Box office ===
To Every You I've Loved Before grossed ¥200 million (US$1.5 million) in Japan and US$53,146 in Vietnam, for a worldwide total of US$1.58 million. In its opening weekend, the film debuted tenth at the box office ranking in Japan.

=== Critical response ===
The Japanese review and survey firm Filmarks placed To Every You I've Loved Before sixth in their first-day satisfaction ranking, with an average rating of 3.54/5, based on 278 reviews.

MrAJCosplay at Anime News Network hoped the film had delved more on the idea of depicting different social standings of alternate versions of oneself than to keep it to "a few specific and predictable scenarios", but Koyomi's love story was "strong enough to carry me throughout most of the film... until the final third of it." They found that the film's explanation of parallel universes was "relatively simple and easy to digest", but they noted that it began its need to "catch us up to speed with everything that is going on in its sister film for the sake of tying the dramatic climaxes together", which they felt was "not graceful". Alicia Haddick at Crunchyroll felt the film was "the second part of a story" and a need to watch its companion film to fill up the "awkward and unfinished" story beats. She noted the "rough" animation and felt the conclusion would "makes sense with an understanding of both films, while also taking away from the more interesting story it could have told without the gimmick of two films".
