= Mie Sonozaki =

Japanese actress, voice actress and singer

- 園崎 未恵
- Born: February 7, 1973 (age 53); Tokyo, Japan
- Occupations: Actress; voice actress; singer
- Years active: 1994–present
- Agent: Remax (business alliance)
- Height: 155.5 cm (5 ft 1 in)
- Website: www.sonozaki-mie.com

Mie Sonozaki (園崎 未恵, Sonozaki Mie; born February 7, 1973) is a Japanese actress, voice actress, and singer from Tokyo, Japan. She is best known for her role as Arle Nadja in the long-running video game series, Puyo Puyo; and Jeanne in Bayonetta. She is also the official Japanese dubbing roles for Hayley Atwell, Elisha Cuthbert, Kirsten Dunst, and many more.

== Filmography ==
=== Anime series ===
1997

- Dragoon (Bubb)

1998

- Legend of Basara (Shinbashi)

1999

- Elf ban Kakyuusei (Miyuki Iijima)
- To Heart (female student; school announcement; Yoshii)

2000

- Doki Doki Densetsu Mahōjin Guru Guru (Star Soldier; little girl)
- Yu-Gi-Oh! Duel Monsters (Kenta)

2001

- The Legend of Condor Hero (Shouryuujo)
- Comic Party (Aya Hasebe; Mayu Yumeji)
- Steel Angel Kurumi 2 (Uruka Sumeragi)

2002

- Beyblade V-Force (Queen)
- Cyborg 009 (Lina)
- Gun Frontier (Maya Yukikaze; Tarou)
- Happy Lesson (Hazuki Yazakura; Female Student)
- Whistle! (Akira Saionji)

2003

- Kino's Journey (Female Examiner)

2004

- Bleach (Sode no Shirayuki)
- Burst Angel (Nadeshiko)
- Diamond Daydreams (Jun)
- Gantz (Sei Sakuraoka; High School Girl; Young Kurono)

2005

- MÄR (Chimera)
- Sugar Sugar Rune (Prattle)

2006

- Bakumatsu Kikansetsu Irohanihoheto (Kotoha)
- Glass Fleet (Mischka)
- Humanoid Monster Bem (Urara Hinata)
- The Story of Saiunkoku (Kou Shoukun)
- xxxHolic (Voice)
- Yoshinaga-san Chi no Gargoyle (Kayanai)
- Witchblade (Reina "Lady" Soho)

2007

- Naruto Shippuden (Yugito Nii, Kokuō)
- Ghost Hunt (Youko Yoshimi)
- Romeo × Juliet (Lancelot's Wife)

2008

- Naruto Shippuden (Yugito Nii, Kokuo)
- Strike Witches (Gertrud Barkhorn)

2009

- Isekai no Seikishi Monogatari (Yukine Mare)

2011

- Beyblade: Metal Fury (Ryuto)

2012

- Kingdom (Yo Tan Wa)

2013

- Vividred Operation (Crow)
- Yu-Gi-Oh! Zexal II (Umimi Habara)

2014

- Your Lie in April (Hiroko Seto)
- One Piece (Violet)
- Yu-Gi-Oh! Arc-V (Sora Shiun'in)

2016

- Kiznaiver (Mutsumi "Urushy" Urushibara)

2017

- Princess Principal (Zelda)

2018

- My Hero Academia (Nana Shimura)
- Legend of the Galactic Heroes: Die Neue These (Dominique Saint-Pierré)

2019

- Fairy Gone (Nein Auraa)
- Fruits Basket (Tohru's Aunt)
- Strike Witches 501st Unit, Taking Off! (Gertrud Barkhorn)
- Star Twinkle PreCure (Darknest/Ophiuchus)

2020

- Great Pretender (Cynthia Moore)
- Digimon Adventure: (Yuuko Kamiya/Gatomon/Skullknightmon/Axeknightmon)

2021

- World Trigger 2nd Season (Wen Sō)
- SK8 the Infinity (Nanako Hasegawa)
- Edens Zero (Madame Kurenai)

2022

- The Greatest Demon Lord Is Reborn as a Typical Nobody (Olivia vel Vine)
- Aoashi (Noriko Aoi)

2023

- High Card (Brandy Blumenthal)
- The Legend of Heroes: Trails of Cold Steel – Northern War (Jeina Storm)

2024

- Days with My Stepsister (Eiha Kudō)

2025

- Enter The Garden (Shao)
- I Want to Escape from Princess Lessons (Lily)
- With You and the Rain (Michiko)
- Gachiakuta (Semiu)
- Let's Play (Monica McKenzie)

2026

- Uncle's Obsession with Cute Things (Hoho Takebayashi)

=== Original video animation ===
- YU-NO (1998) (Eriko Takeda)
- Refrain Blue (2000) (Mystic Girl)
- Tenbatsu! Angel Rabbie (2004) (Arte Sema)
- Naruto Special: Battle at Hidden Falls (2004) (Himatsu)
- Growlanser IV (2005) (Dianna Silvernale)
- Stratos 4 Advance (2006) (Nakamura Saiun)
- Street Fighter IV: The Ties That Bind (2009) (Crimson Viper)
- Super Street Fighter IV (2010) (Crimson Viper)

=== Original net animation ===
- Pokémon Evolutions (2021) (Lusamine)
- Junji Ito Maniac: Japanese Tales of the Macabre (2023) (Mitsu Uchida)
- Moonrise (2025) (Dr. Salamandra)

=== Anime films ===
- Strike Witches: The Movie (2012) (Gertrud Barkhorn)
- Bayonetta: Bloody Fate (2013) (Jeanne)
- Cyborg 009 VS Devilman (2015) (Daemon Lilith)
- To Every You I've Loved Before (2022)
- To Me, the One Who Loved You (2022)

=== Video games ===
- Twins Story: Kimi ni Tsutaetakute (1998) (Shinnosuke Nakamura)
- Shadow Hearts (2001) (Margarete Gertrude Zelle)
- Growlanser IV (2003) (Dianna Silvernale)
- Puyo Puyo series (2003–2024) (Arle Nadja, Klug, Possessed Klug, Dark Arle, Doppelganger Arle, Shizunagi, Stein)
- Sakura Taisen V (2005) (Subaru Kujo)
- Tales of Legendia (2005) (Stella Telmes)
- Final Fantasy XII (2006) (Ashe B'nargin Dalmasca)
- Eternal Sonata (2007) (Claves)
- Luminous Arc (2007) (Saki)
- Street Fighter IV (2008) (Crimson Viper)
- BioShock (2007) (Brigid Tenenbaum)
- Bayonetta (2009, Wii U version) (Jeanne)
- Final Fantasy XIII (2009) (Jihl Nabaat)
- Fragile Dreams: Farewell Ruins of the Moon (2009) (Crow)
- Super Street Fighter IV (2010) (Crimson Viper)
- Marvel vs. Capcom 3: Fate of Two Worlds (2011) (Crimson Viper)
- Ace Combat: Assault Horizon (2011, Japanese version) (Janice Rehl)
- Sly Cooper Collection (2011) (Carmelita Montoya Fox)
- Ultimate Marvel vs. Capcom 3 (2011) (Crimson Viper)
- Final Fantasy XIII-2 (2011) (Jihl Nabaat)
- Deus Ex: Human Revolution (2011) (Megan Reed)
- Yakuza 5 (2012) (Mariko)
- Bayonetta 2 (2014) (Jeanne)
- Hyrule Warriors (2014) (Narration)
- Far Cry 4 (2015) (Amita)
- Street Fighter V (2016) (Crimson Viper)
- Yakuza 6 (2016) (Mariko)
- Granblue Fantasy (2017) (Ilsa)
- Overwatch (2017) (Moira)
- Pokémon Masters (2019) (Cynthia)
- Arknights (2019) (FEater)
- Another Eden (2019) (Bivette)
- Nioh 2 (2020) (Oichi)
- The Good Life (2021) (Naomi Hayward, Elizabeth Dickens, Pauline Atwood)
- Bayonetta 3 (2022) (Jeanne)
- Tactics Ogre: Reborn (2022) (Ozma Moh Glacius)
- Octopath Traveler II (2023) (Rai Mei)
- Bayonetta Origins: Cereza and the Lost Demon (2023) (Jeanne)
- Street Fighter 6 (2025) (Crimson Viper)

=== Dubbing roles ===
==== Live-action ====
- Hayley Atwell
  - Captain America: The First Avenger (Peggy Carter)
  - The Avengers (Peggy Carter)
  - Captain America: The Winter Soldier (Peggy Carter)
  - Avengers: Age of Ultron (Peggy Carter)
  - Ant-Man (Peggy Carter)
  - Agent Carter (Peggy Carter)
  - Cinderella (Cinderella's Mother)
  - Christopher Robin (Evelyn Robin)
  - Avengers: Endgame (Peggy Carter)
  - Mission: Impossible – Dead Reckoning Part One (Grace)
  - Paddington in Peru (Madison)
  - Mission: Impossible – The Final Reckoning (Grace)
  - Avengers: Doomsday (Peggy Carter)
- Kirsten Dunst
  - The Hairy Bird (Verena von Stefan)
  - Elizabethtown (Claire Colburn)
  - Marie Antoinette (Queen Marie Antoinette of France)
  - Bachelorette (Regan Crawford)
  - The Two Faces of January (Colette MacFarland)
  - Hidden Figures (Vivian Mitchell)
  - The Beguiled (Edwina Morrow)
  - The Power of the Dog (Rose Gordon)
  - Civil War (Lee Smith)
- Jordana Brewster
  - The Fast and the Furious (2024 The Cinema edition) (Mia Toretto)
  - Fast & Furious (Mia Toretto)
  - Fast Five (Mia Toretto)
  - Fast & Furious 6 (Mia Toretto)
  - Furious 7 (Mia Toretto)
  - Home Sweet Hell (Dusty)
  - F9 (Mia Toretto)
  - Fast X (Mia Toretto)
  - Heart Eyes (Det. Jeanine Shaw)
- Emily Blunt
  - Salmon Fishing in the Yemen (Harriet Chetwode-Talbot)
  - The Girl on the Train (Rachel Watson)
  - A Quiet Place (Evelyn Abbott)
  - A Quiet Place Part II (Evelyn Abbott)
  - Oppenheimer (Katherine Oppenheimer)
  - IF (Uni)
  - The Fall Guy (Jody Moreno)
  - The Devil Wears Prada 2 (Emily Charlton)
  - Disclosure Day (Margaret Fairchild)
- Elisha Cuthbert
  - Popular Mechanics for Kids (Elisha Cuthbert)
  - Lucky Girl (Kaitlyn Palmerston)
  - 24 (Kimberly Bauer)
  - The Girl Next Door (Danielle)
  - House of Wax (Carly Jones)
  - The Quiet (Nina Deer)
  - Captivity (Jennifer Tree)
- Anne Hathaway
  - Ella Enchanted (Netflix edition) (Ella of Frell)
  - Becoming Jane (Jane Austen)
  - The Dark Knight Rises (Selina Kyle/Catwoman)
  - Interstellar (Amelia Brand)
  - The Intern (Jules Ostin)
  - WeCrashed (Rebekah Neumann)
  - Armageddon Time (Esther Graff)
- Kelly Reilly
  - L'Auberge Espagnole (Wendy)
  - Mrs Henderson Presents (Maureen)
  - Sherlock Holmes (Mary Morstan)
  - Sherlock Holmes: A Game of Shadows (Mary Watson)
  - Heaven Is for Real (Sonja Burpo)
- Rose Byrne
  - Adam (Beth Buchwald)
  - Bridesmaids (Helen Harris III)
  - Insidious (Renai Lambert)
  - Insidious: Chapter 2 (Renai Lambert)
  - Insidious: The Red Door (Renai Lambert)
- Bryce Dallas Howard
  - The Village (Ivy Walker)
  - Jurassic World (2025 The Cinema edition) (Claire Dearing)
  - Jurassic World: Fallen Kingdom (2025 The Cinema edition) (Claire Dearing)
  - Jurassic World Dominion (2025 The Cinema edition) (Claire Dearing)
  - Argylle (Elly Conway)
- The King's Man (Polly (Gemma Arterton))
- 13 Minutes (Else Härlen (Katharina Schüttler))
- 500 Days of Summer (Autumn (Minka Kelly))
- Ace Ventura: Pet Detective (2025 BS10 Star Channel edition) (Melissa Robinson (Courteney Cox))
- Across the Universe (Lucy (Evan Rachel Wood))
- Adventureland (Em Lewin (Emily) (Kristen Stewart))
- The Aftermath (Rachael Morgan (Keira Knightley))
- Against the Dark (Dorothy (Jenna Harrison))
- American Dreamz (Sally Kendoo (Mandy Moore))
- Apple of My Eye (Caroline Andrews (Amy Smart))
- Armour of God (May Bannon (Lola Forner))
- Black Swan (Elizabeth "Beth" MacIntyre / The Dying Swan (Winona Ryder))
- Breach (Juliana O'Neill (Caroline Dhavernas))
- Brightburn (Tori Breyer (Elizabeth Banks))
- Burnt (Helene (Sienna Miller))
- The Chaser (Detective Oh Eun-shil (Park Hyo-joo))
- The Chorus (Count's Wife (Carole Weiss))
- Coherence (Emily (Emily Baldoni))
- Criminal Minds (Jennifer 'JJ' Jareau (A. J. Cook))
- CSI: NY (Lindsay Monroe-Messer (Anna Belknap))
- CZ12 (Coco (Yao Xingtong))
- The Deaths of Ian Stone (Jenny Walker (Christina Cole))
- Don't Worry Darling (Bunny (Olivia Wilde))
- Epic Movie (Lucy Pervertski (Jayma Mays))
- Flying Swords of Dragon Gate (Ling Yanqiu (Zhou Xun))
- G.I. Joe: The Rise of Cobra (Anastasia DeCobray / Baroness (Sienna Miller))
- Game of Thrones (Talisa Maegyr (Oona Chaplin))
- Glass (Dr. Ellie Staple (Sarah Paulson))
- Glass Onion: A Knives Out Mystery (Birdie Jay (Kate Hudson))
- Godmothered (Mackenzie (Isla Fisher))
- A Good Day to Die Hard (Lucy McClane (Mary Elizabeth Winstead))
- The Good Lie (Carrie Davis (Reese Witherspoon))
- The Great Magician (Liu Yin (Zhou Xun))
- Grey's Anatomy (Lexie Grey (Chyler Leigh))
- The Handmaid's Tale (Serena Joy Waterford (Yvonne Strahovski))
- A Haunting in Venice (Rowena Drake (Kelly Reilly))
- He's Just Not That Into You (Gigi Phillips (Ginnifer Goodwin))
- Her (Amy (Amy Adams))
- Honey (Honey Daniels (Jessica Alba))
- How Do You Know (Lisa Jorgenson (Reese Witherspoon))
- I Feel Pretty (Avery LeClaire (Michelle Williams))
- Into the Blue (Amanda Collins (Ashley Scott))
- J. Edgar (Helen Gandy (Naomi Watts))
- The Jacket (Jackie Price (Keira Knightley))
- John Tucker Must Die (Kate Spencer (Brittany Snow))
- Joy Ride 2: Dead Ahead (Melissa Scott (Nicki Aycox))
- Let the Right One In (Oskar Eriksson (Kåre Hedebrant))
- Live Free or Die Hard (Lucy McClane (Mary Elizabeth Winstead))
- Manchester by the Sea (Randi (Michelle Williams))
- The Muppets (Veronica (Rashida Jones))
- The Namesake (Maxine Ratcliffe (Jacinda Barrett))
- No Time to Die (Madeleine Swann (Léa Seydoux))
- Ocean's 8 (Tammy (Sarah Paulson))
- Once (Girl (Markéta Irglová))
- One Missed Call (Taylor Anthony (Ana Claudia Talancón))
- One Tree Hill (Peyton Sawyer (Hilarie Burton))
- Orange is the New Black (Piper Chapman (Taylor Schilling))
- Oz the Great and Powerful (Glinda (Michelle Williams))
- Painted Skin: The Resurrection (Xiao Wei (Zhou Xun))
- Priest (Priestess (Maggie Q))
- Push (Cassie Holmes (Dakota Fanning))
- Race (Leni Riefenstahl (Carice van Houten))
- Rémi sans famille (Mrs. Barberin (Ludivine Sagnier))
- Scooby-Doo (Daphne Blake (Sarah Michelle Gellar))
- Scooby-Doo 2: Monsters Unleashed (Daphne Blake (Sarah Michelle Gellar))
- The Secret Life of Bees (Lily Owens (Dakota Fanning))
- Shooter (Julie Swagger (Shantel VanSanten))
- Skyline (Elaine (Scottie Thompson))
- Skylines (Rose Corley (Lindsey Morgan))
- Smallville (Lois Lane (Erica Durance))
- Southland Tales (Madeline Frost Santaros (Mandy Moore))
- Spectre (Dr. Madeleine Swann (Léa Seydoux))
- Stardust (Victoria Forester (Sienna Miller))
- Step Up: All In (Andie West (Briana Evigan))
- Stranger Things (Joyce Byers (Winona Ryder))
- This Is Us (Rebecca Pearson (Mandy Moore))
- The Time Traveler's Wife (Clare Abshire-DeTamble (Rachel McAdams))
- The Tomorrow War (Colonel Muri Forester (Yvonne Strahovski))
- Valentine's Day (Julia Fitzpatrick (Jennifer Garner))
- Walk the Line (Vivian Liberto (Ginnifer Goodwin))
- War (Kira Yanagawa (Devon Aoki))
- Water for Elephants (Marlena Rosenbluth (Reese Witherspoon))
- Wednesday (Dr. Valerie Kinbott (Riki Lindhome))
- Wheels on Meals (Sylvia (Lola Forner))
- Yesterday (Ellie Appleton (Lily James))
- Young Goethe in Love (Lotte Buff (Miriam Stein))
- Younger (Liza Miller (Sutton Foster))

==== Animation ====
- American Dragon: Jake Long (Trixie Carter)
- The Angry Birds Movie (Matilda)
- The Angry Birds Movie 2 (Matilda)
- Cars 3 (Natalie Certain)
- The Croods: A New Age (Hope Betterman)
- Happy Feet (Gloria)
- Jurassic World Camp Cretaceous (Dr. Mae Turner)
- KaBlam! (Thundergirl)
- Madagascar 3: Europe's Most Wanted (Gia)
- Open Season (Giselle)
- Open Season 2 (Giselle)
- Open Season 3 (Giselle)
- Sausage Party (Brenda Bunson)
- Tangled: The Series (Cassandra)
- Tinker Bell (Iridessa)
- Tinker Bell and the Lost Treasure (Iridessa)
- Tinker Bell and the Great Fairy Rescue (Iridessa)
- Tinker Bell and the Secret of the Wings (Iridessa)
- Tinker Bell and the Pirate Fairy (Iridessa)
- Tinker Bell and the Legend of the NeverBeast (Iridessa)
- WALL-E (Eve)
- What If...? (Peggy Carter)
