= Kimiko Yo =

Japanese actress (born 1956)

- 余 貴美子
- Born: 12 May 1956 (age 70); Yokohama, Kanagawa Prefecture, Japan
- Citizenship: Japan, Republic of China
- Occupation: Actress
- Years active: 1987–present

Kimiko Yo (余 貴美子, Yo Kimiko; born 12 May 1956) is a Japanese actress. She was given Best Supporting Actress awards at the 2004 and the 2009 Yokohama Film Festival ceremonies. She won the award for best supporting actress at the 32nd and at the 33rd Japan Academy Prize for Departures and Dear Doctor respectively.

== Family ==
Yo was born in Yokohama, Kanagawa Prefecture. Her mother is Japanese and her father is Taiwanese of Hakka descent, who moved to Japan for business and later founded the Hakka Association in Japan.

== Filmography ==
=== Films ===
Year	Title	Role	Notes	Ref.
2016	Shin Godzilla			
2020	Hotel Royal			
2021	First Gentleman	Takako Sōma		
2022	Noise			
2022	A Winter Rose	Michiko		
2022	Everything Will Be Owlright!	Minoshima		
2022	To Every You I've Loved Before	Old Kazune (voice)		
2022	To Me, the One Who Loved You	Old Kazune (voice)		
2023	Mentai Piriri: Flower of Pansy	Tsuru Yoshida		
2024	52-Hertz Whales	Noriko Okada		
2026	The Imaginary Dog and the Lying Cat			
2026	Euthanasia Special Zone			
2026	The Invisibles	Eriko Sunakawa		
2026	Sheep in the Box	Nobuyo Nishimura		
2026	Sinsin and the Mouse			
2026	Two Cigarettes, Three Nights	Projectionist		
2026	The Canary's Lullaby	Tae	Lead role; Taiwanese-Japanese film	
2027	Okinawa Confidential	Yoshie Miyara		
2027	Last Vacation			

=== Television ===
Year	Title	Role	Notes	Ref.
2001	Churasan	Yoko Ikehata	Asadora	
2008	Atsuhime	Fusahime	Taiga drama	
2023	Trillion Game	Shizuki Mitsuzono		
2024	The Tiger and Her Wings	Yuri Hoshi	Asadora	
2026	Straight to Hell	Kiyo Mita		

== Honours ==
- Medal with Purple Ribbon (2019)
