= Mutsumi Tamura =

Japanese voice actress (born 1987)

- 田村 睦心
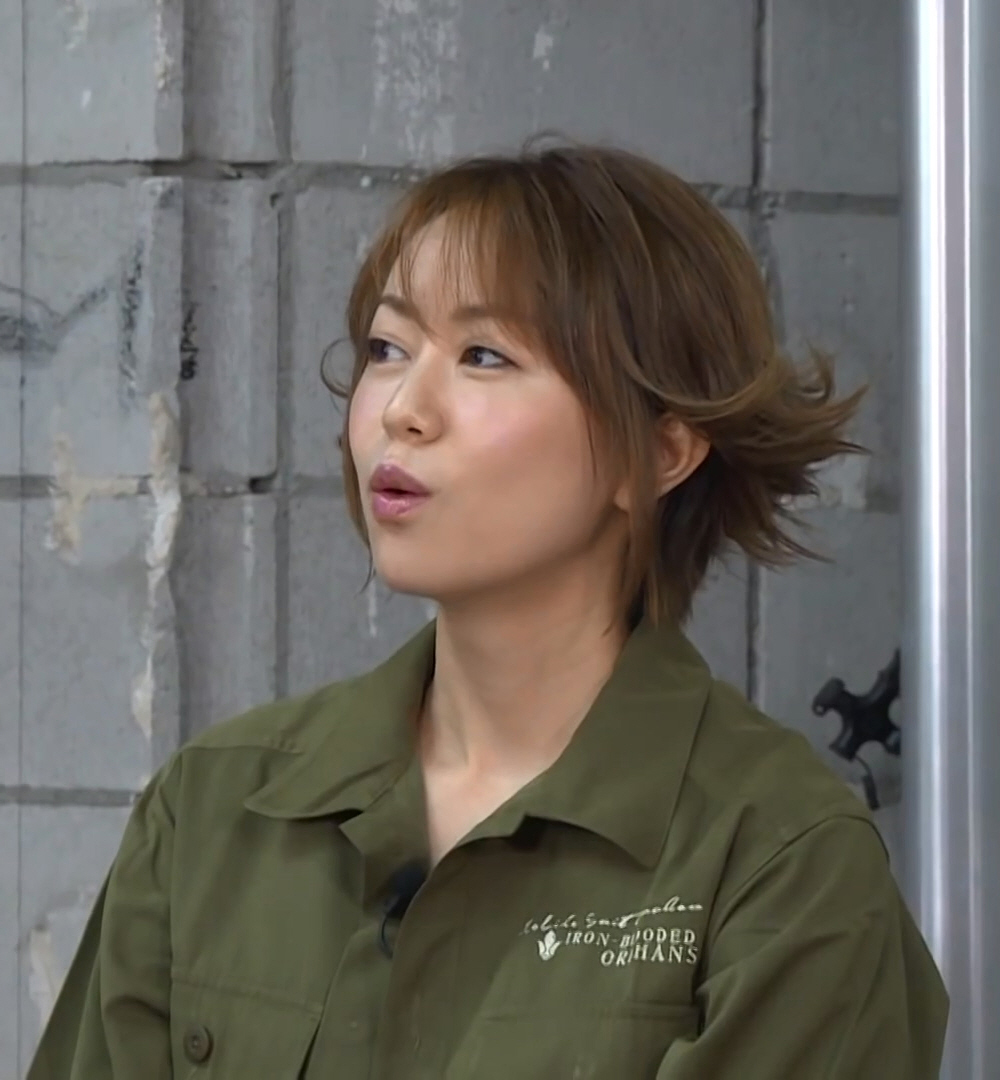
- Mutsumi Tamura in 2017
- Born: June 19, 1987 (age 39); Aomori Prefecture, Japan
- Occupation: Voice actress
- Years active: 2007–present
- Agent: I'm Enterprise
- Spouse: Undisclosed (m. 2024)

Mutsumi Tamura (田村 睦心, Tamura Mutsumi; born June 19, 1987) is a Japanese voice actress affiliated with I'm Enterprise.

== Biography ==
She made her debut role for ef: a tale of memories and had a leading role for the anime series Battle Spirits: Shounen Toppa Bashin. In August 2015, Tamura underwent surgery to remove a polyp from her throat. She wrote in her blog that she would return to acting on September 1 and explained her health problem on a radio show on September 8.

== Personal life ==
On April 1, 2024, Tamura announced her marriage through her X (Twitter) account.

== Filmography ==
=== Anime series ===
Year	Title	Role	Notes	Ref.
2007	ef: a tale of memories	Kyosuke (young)		
2008	Shigofumi: Letts from the Departed	Female Student	ep. 3	
2008	Skip Beat!	Corn		
2008	Tales of the Abyss	Pere	ep. 1	
2008	Chiko, Heiress of the Phantom Thief	Ken (young)		
2008	Nodame Cantabile: Paris	Child Playing the Role of An Angel	ep. 5	
2008	Battle Spirits: Shounen Toppa Bashin	Toppa Bashin		
2008	Blassreiter	Zaza	eps. 13–14	
2009	Samurai Harem	Masashi		
2009	Anyamaru Tantei Kiruminzuu	Ken Inomata		
2009	11eyes	Takahisa Tajima (young)		
2009	Clannad After Story	Boy	ep. 15	
2009	Taisho Baseball Girls	Taro		
2009	Basquash!	Child A	ep. 6	
2009	White Album	Assistant A	ep. 1	
2009	Modern Magic Made Simple	Soshiro Anehara (young)		
2010	Cat Planet Cuties	Kio Kakazu		
2010	The Betrayal Knows My Name	Boy A Bully B		
2010	Otome Yokai Zakuro	Kiri, Omodaka (young)		
2010	Seitokai Yakuindomo	Sayaka Dejima, Schoolgirl	ep. 6	
2010	And Yet the Town Moves	Takeru Arashiyama		
2011	Anohana: The Flower We Saw That Day	Jintan (child)		
2011	Horizon in the Middle of Nowhere	Toussaint Neshinbara		
2011	C	Clerk	ep. 8	
2011	Shakugan no Shana III	Pirsoyn		
2011	Sekai-ichi Hatsukoi	Sato	ep. 1	
2011	Tiger & Bunny	Kotetsu T. Kaburagi (young)		
2011	Naruto: Shippuden	Kakashi Hatake (young)		
2011	Wandering Son	Takanori Oka, Yamanaka		
2011	Mitsudomoe Zoryochu!	Koganei		
2011	Beyblade: Metal Fury	King		
2012	Horizon in the Middle of Nowhere II	Toussaint Neshinbara		
2012	Kill Me Baby	Sonya		
2012	Kuromajo-san ga Toru!!	Hayate Tsuchigama	ep. 19	
2012	Psycho-Pass	Melancholia		
2012	From the New World	K	ep. 12	
2012	Smile Precure!	Takeru	ep. 35	
2012	The Familiar of Zero F	Damian		
2012	Tari Tari	Brat Leader	ep. 3	
2012	Chosoku Henkei Gyrozetter	Eraser 01 / Souta Gunji		
2012	Pretty Rhythm Dear My Future	Shiono	ep. 32	
2012	Magi: The Labyrinth of Magic	Alibaba (young)		
2012	Future Diary	Moe Wakaba	eps. 18–25	
2012	Medaka Box Abnormal	Sano Tsushima, Uno Tsushima		
2012	Jormungand	Jonah		
2012	Jormungand: Perfect Order	Jonah		
2012	Lagrange: The Flower of Rin-ne	Masato Kumogami		
2013	Aikatsu!	Sakon Kitaoji		
2013	Karneval	Yanari		
2013	The Pet Girl of Sakurasou	Boy A	ep. 18	
2013	Strike the Blood	Kojo (Young)		
2013	Danchi Tomoo	Masato Yoshimoto		
2013	A Lull in the Sea	Gyomenso		
2013	Magi: The Kingdom of Magic	Alibaba (young)		
2013	Yozakura Quartet: Hana no Uta	Akina Hiizumi (young)		
2014	Girl Friend BETA	Satoru Kimijima		
2014	Seitokai Yakuindomo*	Sayaka Dejima		
2014	Tokyo ESP	Kyotaro Azuma (Young)		
2014	Konna Watashi-tachi ga Nariyuki de Heroine ni Natta Kekka www 'Narihero www'	Sokura Bon		
2014	Nobunagun	Cyx		
2014	Buddy Complex	Lasha Hakkarainen		
2015	Venus Project: Climax	Kenta		
2015	Overlord	Ninya		
2015	The Asterisk War	Camilla Pareto		
2015	Is It Wrong to Try to Pick Up Girls in a Dungeon?	Finn Deimne		
2015	Mobile Suit Gundam: Iron-Blooded Orphans	Ride Mass		
2015	Rin-ne	Hiroshi Nekota	ep. 6	
2015	Battle Spirits Burning Soul	Ranmaru Shikigami, Boy 2 Boy A Spectator A Spectator B Spectator C		
2015	Comet Lucifer	Patrick Yan		
2016	Undefeated Bahamut Chronicle	Lux Arcadia		
2016	Monster Hunter Stories: Ride On	Lute		
2016	Gate	Beefeater E Caty		
2017	Miss Kobayashi's Dragon Maid	Kobayashi		
2017	Battle Girl High School	Asuha Kusunoki		
2017	Land of the Lustrous	Morganite		
2017	Made in Abyss	Nat		
2018	How to Keep a Mummy	Sora Kashiwagi		
2018	Darling in the Franxx	Zorome		
2018	Dances with the Dragons	Yorkan		
2018	Beyblade Burst Super Z	Laban Vanot		
2018	Cells at Work!	Naive T Cell		
2018	Captain Tsubasa	Ryo Ishizaki		
2018	Merc Storia: The Apathetic Boy and the Girl in a Bottle	Yu		
2018	Yo-kai Watch Shadowside	Akinori Arihoshi		
2019	If It's for My Daughter, I'd Even Defeat a Demon Lord	Rudy		
2019	Ascendance of a Bookworm	Lutz		
2019	Sword Art Online: Alicization – War of Underworld	Renly		
2020	Keep Your Hands Off Eizouken!	Sayaka Kanamori		
2020	Healin' Good Pretty Cure	Daruizen		
2020	Ascendance of a Bookworm 2nd Season	Lutz		
2020	My Next Life as a Villainess: All Routes Lead to Doom!	Alan Stuart (childhood)		
2020	Yo-kai Watch Jam – Yo-kai Academy Y: Close Encounters of the N Kind	Jinpei Jiba		
2020	Mewkledreamy	Rei		
2020	Noblesse	Ludis Mergas		
2021	Miss Kobayashi's Dragon Maid S	Kobayashi		
2021	Digimon Ghost Game	Hiro Amanokawa		
2021	Gunma-chan	Tama		
2021	The Vampire Dies in No Time	John		
2021	Vivy: Fluorite Eye's Song	Tatsuya Saeki (young)		
2022	Tribe Nine	Santarō Mita		
2022	Ascendance of a Bookworm 3rd Season	Lutz		
2022	Lucifer and the Biscuit Hammer	Taiyō Akane		
2023	Technoroid Overmind	Esora Shibaura		
2023	KamiKatsu	Kai		
2023	The Ancient Magus' Bride 2nd Season	Alice		
2023	Hyakushō Kizoku	Hiromu Arakawa		
2023	Shy	Stigma		
2024	The Weakest Tamer Began a Journey to Pick Up Trash	Sora		
2024	One Piece	Vegapunk York		
2024	Yatagarasu: The Raven Does Not Choose Its Master	Yukiya		
2024	Tonari no Yōkai-san	Takumi Ōishi		
2024	Kaiju No. 8	Tae Nakanoshima		
2024	Wistoria: Wand and Sword	Finn		
2024	Haigakura	Ryū		
2025	Mashin Creator Wataru	Wataru Hoshibe		
2025	Sakamoto Days	Shin (young)	Eps. 8–9	
2025	Apocalypse Hotel	Fuguri		
2025	Teogonia	Kai		
2025	Dandadan	Evil Eye	Season 2	
2025	Clevatess	Clen		
2025	A Star Brighter Than the Sun	Mio Kagawa		
2025	Digimon Beatbreak	Pristimon		
2025	Gachiakuta	Noerde Hew Amozo		
2026	Playing Death Games to Put Food on the Table	Beniya		
2026	Kaya-chan Isn't Scary	Kenken		
2026	'Tis Time for "Torture," Princess	Sakura Heartrock	Season 2	
2026	Hell Mode	Allen		
2026	Dara-san of Reiwa	Dara-san		
2026	Witch Hat Atelier	Tartah		
2026	Akane-banashi	Urara Ransaika		
2027	Shiba Inu Rooms	Mu		
TBA	Millennium Family	Arthur Benfield		

=== Original net animation ===
Year	Title	Role	Ref.
2021	Beyblade Burst Dynamite Battle	Bell Daikokuten	
2021	The Way of the Househusband	Ryota	
2021–22	JoJo's Bizarre Adventure: Stone Ocean	Ermes Costello, Eldis	
2022	Doomsday With My Dog	Haru the Dog	
2024	The Grimm Variations	Hansel	
2025	Sakamoto Days	young Shin Asakura	

=== Original video animation ===
Year	Title	Role	Ref.
	Five Numbers!	Coupier	
	Kill Me Baby Super	Sonya	
	Mobile Suit Gundam Unicorn	Tikva	
	Cat Planet Cuties	Kio Kakazu	
2011–present	Seitokai Yakuindomo	Sayaka Dejima	

=== Anime films ===
Year	Title	Role	Ref.
2010	Naruto Shippuden the Movie: The Lost Tower	Kakashi Hatake (young)	
2012	Tiger & Bunny: The Beginning	Kotetsu T. Kaburagi (young)	
2015	Cyborg 009 Vs. Devilman	Abel / Cyborg 0017	
2015	Digimon Adventure tri.	Koshiro Izumi	
2017	Yo-kai Watch Shadowside: Oni-o no Fukkatsu	Akinori Arihoshi	
2019	Saga of Tanya the Evil: The Movie	Vivi	
2019	Is It Wrong to Try to Pick Up Girls in a Dungeon?	Finn Deimne	
2019	Yo-kai Watch Jam the Movie: Yo-Kai Academy Y – Can a Cat be a Hero?	Jinpei Jiba	
2020	Digimon Adventure: Last Evolution Kizuna	Koshiro Izumi	
2020	Happy-Go-Lucky Days	Yoriko-san	
2022	Drifting Home	Kosuke Kumagai	
2022	To Every You I've Loved Before		
2022	To Me, the One Who Loved You		
2023	Rakudai Majo: Fūka to Yami no Majo	Chitose	
2023	Sand Land	Beelzebub	
2025	Miss Kobayashi's Dragon Maid: A Lonely Dragon Wants to Be Loved	Kobayashi	

=== Video games ===
Year	Title	Role	Ref.
2006	Granado Espada	Marchetti	
2012	Under Night In-Birth	Byakuya	
2013	Metal Gear Rising: Revengeance	George	
2013	Horizon in the Middle of Nowhere Portable	Toussaint Neshinbara	
2013	The Last of Us	Riley Abel	
2014	Yatagarasu Attack on Cataclysm	Hinukan Kou	
2015	Battle Girl High School	Asuha Kusunoki	
2015	Dragon Ball Xenoverse	Time Patroller (Female 10)	
2016	Dragon Quest Heroes II	Gabo	
2016	Monster Hunter Stories	Protagonist (Male Voice 1)	
2017	Azur Lane	IJN Ise	
2017	Shin Megami Tensei: Strange Journey Redux	Mia, Anahita	
2017	Kirara Fantasia	Cardamom	
2018	Super Robot Wars X	Lasha Hakkarainen	
2018	Captain Tsubasa Zero: Miracle Shoot	Ryō ishizaki	
2018	Dragalia Lost	Yuya	
2019	Yo-kai Watch 4	Akinori Arihoshi	
2019	Grand Chase Dimensional Chaser	Esnar Din Kanavan	
2019	Jump Force	Avatar	
2020	Girls' Frontline	PM1910, SVCh	
2020	Captain Tsubasa: Rise of New Champions	Ryō ishizaki	
2020	Guardian Tales	Golem Rider Alef	
2020	Genshin Impact	Teucer	
2020	Crash Fever	Durkheim	
2020	Sword Art Online: Alicization Lycoris	Renly	
2020	Demon's Souls	Yuria, the Witch; Selen Vinland	
2021	The Legend of Heroes: Trails Through Daybreak	Quatre Salision	
2021	Gate of Nightmares	Tom	
2022	JoJo's Bizarre Adventure: All Star Battle R	Hermes Costello	
2022	Fire Emblem Warriors: Three Hopes	Arval, Epimenides	
2022	The Legend of Heroes: Trails Through Daybreak II	Quatre Salision	
2022	Goddess of Victory: Nikke	Mihara, Milk	
2023	Path to Nowhere	Deren	
2023	Street Fighter 6	A.K.I	
2023	Fate/Samurai Remnant	Yui Shousetsu	
2025	Inazuma Eleven: Victory Road	Kameo Kodokai	

=== Dubbing ===
==== Live-action ====
Title	Role	Dubbing actor	Ref.
Alcatraz	Dylan Callahan	Will Shadley	
All Roads Lead to Rome	Summer	Rosie Day	
Arrow	Shado	Celina Jade	
Avatar: Fire and Ash	Varang	Oona Chaplin	
Avengers: Doomsday	Yelena Belova / Black Widow	Florence Pugh	
Black Christmas	Kris	Aleyse Shannon	
Black Widow	Yelena Belova / Black Widow	Florence Pugh	
Carrie	Chris Hargensen	Portia Doubleday	
Cleveland Abduction	Michelle Knight	Taryn Manning	
The Dark Knight Rises	Jen	Juno Temple	
Dracula Untold	Ingreas	Art Parkinson	
Drive-Away Dolls	Jamie	Margaret Qualley	
The Exorcist	Katherine Rance	Brianne Howey	
Far from the Madding Crowd	Fanny Robin	Juno Temple	
Friends with Benefits	Kayla	Emma Stone	
Fun Size	Wren DeSantis	Victoria Justice	
Get the Gringo	Kid	Kevin Balmore	
Glass Onion: A Knives Out Mystery	Peg	Jessica Henwick	
Glee	Wade "Unique" Adams	Alex Newell	
Gossip Girl	Julien Calloway	Jordan Alexander	
Gotham	Bruce Wayne	David Mazouz	
The Green Hornet	Britt Reid (young)	Joshua Erenberg	
The Half of It	Ellie Chu	Leah Lewis	
Hawkeye	Yelena Belova / Black Widow	Florence Pugh	
Hawthorne	Camille Hawthorne	Hannah Hodson	
Her	Surrogate Date Isabella	Portia Doubleday	
House of Gucci	Patrizia Reggiani	Lady Gaga	
The Ice Road	Tantoo	Amber Midthunder	
It Chapter One	Benjamin "Ben" Hanscom	Jeremy Ray Taylor	
It Chapter Two	Benjamin "Ben" Hanscom	Jeremy Ray Taylor	
Kraven the Hunter	Calypso Ezili	Ariana DeBose	
The Last Mercenary	Dalila	Assa Sylla	
Let's Be Cops	Josie	Nina Dobrev	
Lincoln Rhyme: Hunt for the Bone Collector	Amelia Sachs	Arielle Kebbel	
Lord of the Flies	Jack	Lox Pratt	
Mad Max: Fury Road	Toast the Knowing	Zoë Kravitz	
Mickey 17	Nasha Barridge	Naomi Ackie	
Mike and Dave Need Wedding Dates	Tatiana	Aubrey Plaza	
A Monster Calls	Conor O'Malley	Lewis MacDougall	
Morbius	Young Michael	Charlie Shotwell	
Mr. Robot	Angela Moss	Portia Doubleday	
The New Daughter	Sam James	Gattlin Griffith	
Novocaine	Sherry Margrave	Amber Midthunder	
Once Upon a Time	Nicholas Zimmer/Hansel	Quinn Lord	
One of Them Days	Alyssa	SZA	
The Originals	Hayley Marshall	Phoebe Tonkin	
Percy Jackson: Sea of Monsters	Clarisse La Rue	Leven Rambin	
Slaughterhouse Rulez	Wootton	Kit Connor	
Smash	Veronica Moore	Jennifer Hudson	
Spider-Man: Brand New Day	Yelena Belova / Black Widow	Florence Pugh	
A Star Is Born	Ally Maine	Lady Gaga	
Strays	Cathy	Tinashe Kajese-Bolden	
Ted	John Bennett (young)	Bretton Manley	
Thor	Darcy Lewis	Kat Dennings	
Thor: The Dark World	Darcy Lewis	Kat Dennings	
WandaVision	Darcy Lewis	Kat Dennings	
Thor: Love and Thunder	Darcy Lewis	Kat Dennings	
Thunderbolts*	Yelena Belova / Black Widow	Florence Pugh	
To Kill a Mockingbird	Jeremy Atticus "Jem" Finch	Phillip Alford	
Tomb Raider	Sophie	Hannah John-Kamen	
Tron: Ares	Athena	Jodie Turner-Smith	
Vampire Academy	Rose Hathaway	Sisi Stringer	
The Way Back	Angela	Janina Gavankar	
West Side Story	Anita	Ariana DeBose	
Whitney Houston: I Wanna Dance with Somebody	Whitney Houston	Naomi Ackie	
Willow	Princess Kit	Ruby Cruz	
The Witches	Hero Boy	Jahzir Bruno	
Young Sheldon	Evelyn Ingram	Danielle Pinnock	
Zoey's Extraordinary Playlist	Mo	Alex Newell	

==== Animation ====
Title	Role	Ref.
Blue Eye Samurai	Mizu	
Love, Death & Robots	Harper	
KPop Demon Hunters	Mira	
Marvel Zombies	Yelena Belova	
Spider-Man: Across the Spider-Verse	Jess Drew / Spider-Woman	
Star Wars Resistance	Tam Ryvora	
Transformers One	Chromia	
Turning Red	Priya	
The Loud House	Luna Loud, Lisa Loud	
The Casagrandes	Luna Loud, Lisa Loud	
The Second Best Hospital in the Galaxy	Dr. Klak	
