= Comet Lucifer =

Japanese anime television series

- Promotional image

コメット・ルシファー (Kometto Rushifā)
- Genre: Fantasy, Mecha
- Created by: Eight Bit; Project Felia
- Anime television series
- Directed by: Yasuhito Kikuchi; Atsushi Nakayama
- Written by: Yūichi Nomura
- Music by: Tatsuya Kato
- Studio: Eight Bit
- Licensed by: AUS: Hanabee; NA: Sentai Filmworks; UK: Anime Limited; SA/SEA: Medialink
- Original network: Tokyo MX, KBS, Sun TV, BS11, AT-X
- Original run: October 4, 2015 – December 20, 2015
- Episodes: 12
- icon

Comet Lucifer (Japanese: コメット・ルシファー, Hepburn: Kometto Rushifā) is a 12-episode Japanese anime television series produced by Eight Bit and directed by Yasuhito Kikuchi. It aired between October 4 and December 20, 2015. The anime has been licensed in North America by Sentai Filmworks and in Asia-Pacific by Medialink.

== Plot ==
Gift is a world where glittering blue crystals known as Giftium are buried deep underground. A young boy named Sōgo Amagi lives in the prosperous mining town of Garden Indigo. Sōgo, whose hobby is collecting rare crystals, one day becomes involved in a dispute between classmates Kaon, Roman, and Otto. He wanders deep into the ruins of a mine and discovers an underground lake. There, Sōgo meets a mysterious blue-haired girl with red eyes named Felia and their fateful meeting is the start of a new adventure with their newly formed bond.

== Characters ==
Sōgo Amagi (ソウゴ・アマギ, Sōgo Amagi)
Voiced by: Yūsuke Kobayashi
The main protagonist. He is an ecstatic boy who likes to collect rare crystals for his hobby, a fascination he inherited from his mother Ena. He wants to prove one of his mother's theories about the existence of a certain red gem called Lucifer. He has a tendency to act recklessly. After finding Felia in a cave, he goes on several adventures with her and his friends Kaon, Roman, and Otto. He falls in love with Felia and both confess their feelings to each other in the final episode, before Felia leaves behind a pink gem as a memory for him. Later, he becomes a professor and continues his ambition of stone searching while a pink star lighting up in the sky, always shines above him, marking the presence of Felia.
Felia (フェリア, Feria)
Voiced by: Ayaka Ōhashi
The main heroine. She is a mysterious red-eyed, blue-haired girl Sogo found in a cave. She has powers of telekinesis. It is later revealed that she is the embodiment of the planet. She eventually falls in love with Sogo. Both Felia and Sogo confess their feelings to each other in the final episode, where she sacrifices her life to save the planet and Sogo and leaves behind a pink gem as memory for Sogo promising him that she will always be with. Later a pink star lighting up in the sky, always shines above Sogo, marking the presence of Felia.
Kaon Lanchester (カオン・ランチェスター, Kaon Ranchesutā)
Voiced by: Rie Takahashi
One of Sogo's friends at school. She is Roman's former fiancée through an arranged marriage. She has a crush on Sogo. She later marries Roman and they are shown having kids in the ending credits of the series.
Roman Valov (ロマン・ヴァロフ, Roman Varofu)
Voiced by: Takuma Terashima
Another one of Sogo's friends at school. He is Kaon's fiancé through an arranged marriage but breaks the engagement in episode 10, he also owns a mecha. Later, he marries Kaon and both are shown having kids in the ending credits of the series.
Otto Motō (オット・モトー, Otto Motō)
Voiced by: Ayaka Suwa
Roman's butler.
Mo Ritika Tzetzes Ura (モ・リティカ・ツェツェス・ウラ, Mo Ritika Tsetsesu Ura)
Voiced by: Inori Minase
A crystal snake that serves Sogo and Felia. Called Moura for short, she can transform into a mecha when she senses danger. She is there mainly to keep Felia's powers in check.
Hajime Do Mon (ハジメ・ド・モン, Hajime Do Mon)
Voiced by: Kenta Miyake
Owner of a café and Sogo's caretaker. He was previously a researcher who worked closely with Sogo's mother Ena, but he left the profession after Ena was killed over the red crystal that possesses an enormous amount of energy. Since then, he had been running a café and raising Sogo. In episode 9, he died due to being run through by a sword.
Malvina Aniance (マルヴィナ・アニアンス, Maruvina Aniansu)
Voiced by: Suzuko Mimori
Jude Pryce (ジュード・プライス, Juudo Puraisu)
Voiced by: Sho Hayami
Gus Stewart (ガス・スチュワート, Gasu Suchuwaato)
Voiced by: Kenji Hamada
Patrick Yang (パトリック・ヤン, Patorikku Yan)
Voiced by: Mutsumi Tamura
Alfried Macallan (アルフリード・マッカラン, Arufuriido Makkaran)
Voiced by: Junji Majima
Vincent Dudley (ヴィンセント・ダドレー, Vinsento Dadoree)
Voiced by: Hisao Egawa
Lilian Anatolia (リリアン・アナトリア, Ririan Anatoria)
Voiced by: Tomo Muranaka
Gulf Zoneboyle (ガルフ・ゾーンボイル, Garufu Zoonboiru)
Voiced by: Hidekatsu Shibata
Ena Amagi (エナ・アマギ, Ena Amagi)
Voiced by: Mamiko Noto
Gwen Gou (グエン・ゴウ, Guen Gou)
Voiced by: Sho Nogami

== Broadcast and distribution ==
The Comet Lucifer anime television series is produced by Eight Bit and is directed by Yasuhito Kikuchi, with Atsushi Nakayama serving as the series director. The series aired in Japan between October 4 and December 20, 2015, on Tokyo MX. The screenplay is written by Yūichi Nomura, who originally conceived the series. Chief animator Yūichi Takahashi is also the character designer. Takayuki Yanase is the mechanical designer. Sound and music direction is headed by Jin Aketagawa, and the music is composed by Tatsuya Kato. The anime has been licensed in North America by Sentai Filmworks, and was simulcast by Crunchyroll. Medialink licensed the series in Asia-Pacific and streamed on Ani-One Asia YouTube channel. The opening theme is "Comet Lucifer (The Seed and the Sower)" (コメットルシファー 〜The Seed and the Sower〜) by Fhána and the ending theme is "Oshiete Blue Sky" (おしえてブルースカイ) by Ayaka Ōhashi. A series of flash anime shorts titled Garden Indigo no Shasō Kara (ガーデン・インディゴの車窓から, From Garden Indigo's Window) will be released on the Blu-ray compilation volumes starting on January 29, 2016.

=== Episodes ===
No.	Title	Original release date
1	"The Boy and the Vast Land"; Transliteration: "Daichi to Shōnen" (Japanese: 大地と少年)	October 4, 2015
2	"Under One Roof"; Transliteration: "Hitotsu Yane no Shita de" (Japanese: 一つ屋根の下で)	October 11, 2015
3	"Garden Indigo"; Transliteration: "Gāden Indigo" (Japanese: ガーデン・イソディゴ)	October 18, 2015
4	"Storm"; Transliteration: "Arashi" (Japanese: 嵐)	October 25, 2015
5	"Souls Come Together"; Transliteration: "Kasanaru Tamashii" (Japanese: 重なる魂)	November 1, 2015
6	"Flower Boy"; Transliteration: "Furawā Bōi" (Japanese: フラワーボーイ)	November 8, 2015
7	"Place of Warmth"; Transliteration: "Nukumori no Basho" (Japanese: 温もリの場所)	November 15, 2015
8	"Path"; Transliteration: "Michi" (Japanese: 道)	November 22, 2015
9	"The Feelings That Must Be Conveyed"; Transliteration: "Tsutaetai Kokoro" (Japanese: 伝えたい心)	November 29, 2015
10	"The Altar of Abyss"; Transliteration: "Shin'en no Saidan" (Japanese: 深淵の祭壇)	December 6, 2015
11	"The Fallen Angel"; Transliteration: "Ochita Tenshi" (Japanese: 堕ちた天使)	December 13, 2015
12	"The Boy and the Planet"; Transliteration: "Hoshi to Shōnen" (Japanese: 星と少年)	December 20, 2015
