= Natsunagu! =

Japanese anime television series

- Promotional poster

なつなぐ! (Natsunagu!)
- Genre: Coming-of-age, drama, slice-of-life
- Anime television series
- Directed by: Yasuyuki Honda
- Produced by: Shun Fukudome
- Written by: Domeshi
- Music by: Nozawa Daijiro
- Studio: Imagica Lab
- Original network: Tokyo MX
- Original run: January 9, 2020 – March 24, 2020
- Episodes: 12

Natsunagu! (なつなぐ!, Natsunagu!) is an original Japanese anime television series commissioned by the Kumamoto Prefectural Government to promote the prefecture's recovery effort from the 2016 Kumamoto earthquakes. It was released beginning January 9, 2020, on RKK TV, and on various streaming platforms for free.

== Plot ==
Natsuna Keyaki, a post-secondary student living in Tokyo, is contacted by her old friend Itsuki Kusunoki from Kumamoto through an on-line game platform, who she hasn't heard from for 4 years. Unfortunately, whilst Itsuki is responding to Natsuna's reply, the platform abruptly shuts down, leaving them with no way to communicate with each other.

Feeling a responsibility to her friend, she leaves for Kumamoto to see her. When she arrives at Itsuki's last known address, however, she finds that it is now an empty plot of land. Natsuna calls on the nearest police station, meeting with constable Masayoshi Maezono. Masayoshi and Natsuna head to the town hall to ask for information, but the latter is unable to give out any information, citing privacy legislation. Walking back from town hall, Masayoshi and Natsuna are accosted by Izumi Chiba, a lower secondary student who Masayoshi is acquainted with. Izumi takes Natsuna to a pathway by the canal to meet her friends, reasoning they could help her find Itsuki. Whilst Izumi's friends turn out not to know who Itsuki is, Natsuna stays and has some fun with them, smashing watermelons and accidentally falling into the canal.

Izumi takes Natsuna to her family's shop, which doubles as a house, and introduces Natsuna to her father Shigezo Chiba. After taking a bath, Natsuna is invited to drink by Shigezo; she can't hold her liquour. Izumi's mother, Sayuri Chiba, introduces herself to Natsuna, and says she knows of an Itsuki Kusunoki. However, she doesn't know where they are living now; their previous dwelling-place was severely damaged by the 2016 Kumamoto earthquakes.

Natsuna is dropped off at her hotel room by the Chibas, and whilst sleeping, dreams of her drawing together with Itsuki in their in-game bodies. The dream quickly turns into a nightmare as Itsuki crumbles and the earthquakes strike, and Natsuna awakes and cries. In the morning, Natsuna heads to a pier to clear her head as Izumi joins her with two noodle bowls; she has another flash-back to her time with Itsuki. Natsuna is snapped out of her daydream by an old lady who owns a candy store; she mistook Natsuna for another girl, and tells her that a girl used to paint at the very same spot. What's more, she has one of her paintings - which the girl said was of her hometown. Natsuna and Izumi suspect that this girl is actually Itsuki, but the lady does not know where she's gone.

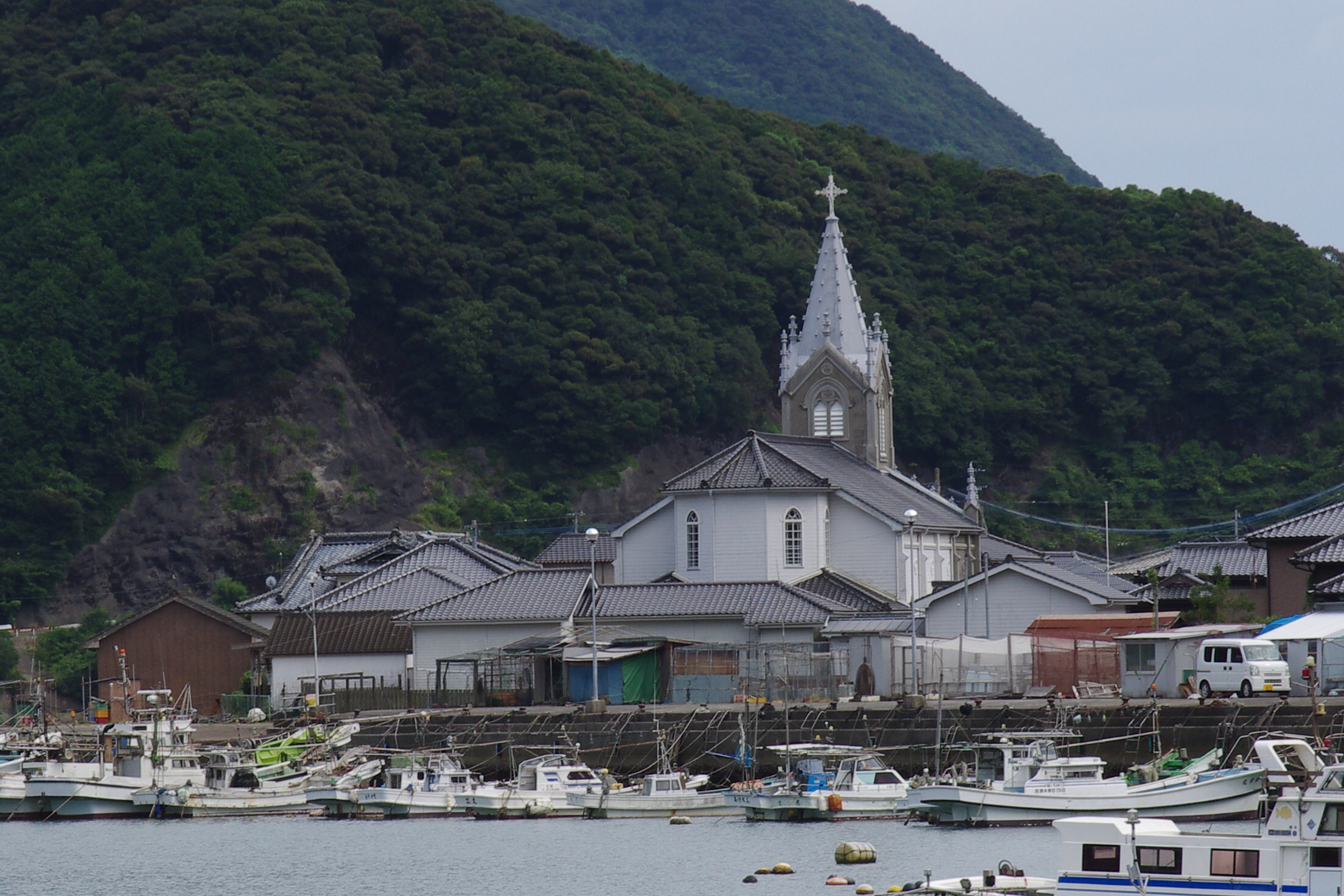
Sakitsu, where Itsuki and her grandmother live.

Natsuna heads back to the Chibas' place to contemplate this along with Izumi, when the latter tells her that she's romantically interested in Masayoshi. Izumi tells her about the things that have changed since the earthquakes, prompting Natsuna to hug her as Shigezo walks in with another bottle of liquour; Shigezo mistakes this gesture for yuri. Out of the corner of her eye, Izumi notices a signature on the painting; the painter girl is indeed Itsuki. Sayuri recognises the view in the painting as being that of Sakitsu, a fishing village in Amakusa. As she rides the bus there, Natsuna contemplates how she just stopped communicating with Itsuki shortly after the earthquakes; rationalising she was busy with school after telling her she was well.

In Sakitsu, Natsuna asks around, finding a spot that she recognises from Itsuki's paintings. There, she happens to run into Haru Kusunoki, Itsuki's grandmother. Haru says that Itsuki is well, but that Itsuki has had problems adapting to things after the earthquakes, and that she rarely wants to see anyone. However, Haru does point her towards a wharf where Itsuki likes to linger. On the wharf, Natsuna encounters a grey-haired girl drawing the evening landscape. The girl says she is not Itsuki, but that she is her school-mate. Natsuna tells her about a promise they'd made together to draw Kumamoto landscapes, and the girl says Itsuki is in France studying art, and that she'd be back by summer's end. Natsuna asks the girl to tell Itsuki about her promise, and leaves.

Natsuna prepares to leave for Tokyo as the Chibas meet her to drop her off at Kumamoto Airport. On the way to the airport, she reflects how fun her stay in Kumamoto had turned out to be, and as they are met by Masayoshi at the airport to send her off, Izumi tearfully hugs Natsuna good-bye. As she checks in for her flight, Natsuna realises that the girl at the wharf must have been Itsuki, and runs out of the airport - getting Masayoshi to drive her back towards Sakitsu. On the highway, Masayoshi's DeLorean breaks down, leaving Natsuna to run for it. At the wharf, she finds the girl there and apologises for not noticing earlier. The girl continues to deny that she is Itsuki, until Natsuna affirms their friendship and that she wanted to say so in person. Itsuki says that she hurt her hand in the earthquake, and couldn't resume drawing until she'd come to Sakitsu to convalesce at her grandmother's place. Itsuki thought she hated her because their comms had cut off. Natsuna assures her that it is not the case, and Itsuki asks for them to draw together - as they tearfully reunite.

== Characters ==
Natsuna Keyaki (欅 夏奈, Keyaki Natsuna)
Voiced by: Ai Hashimoto
Natsuna Keyaki is a post-secondary student living in Tokyo and an old friend of Itsuki Kusunoki's. When she contacts Natsuna after a long hiatus, and that connection is involuntarily severed, Natsuna heads to Kumamoto to investigate her friend's whereabouts.
Masayoshi Maezono (前園 正義, Maezono Masayoshi)
Voiced by: Makoto Furukawa
A constable of the Kumamoto Prefectural Police, Masayoshi Maezono is approached by Natsuna to aid her in finding Itsuki. He is secretly Izumi Chiba's love interest, and drives a DMC DeLorean.
Izumi Chiba (千葉 いずみ, Chiba Izumi)
Voiced by: Yoshino Aoyama
Izumi Chiba is a lower secondary student whose family owns a fruit and vegetable store. She aids Natsuna in finding Itsuki, and is secretly romantically interested in Masayoshi.
Itsuki Kusunoki (楠 伊月, Kusunoki Itsuki)
Voiced by: Miho Saiki
Itsuki Kusunoki is an old friend of Natsuna's, who she met through an on-line game. When she contacts her out of the blue after four years, Natsuna is inspired to find and re-unite with her to fulfil a promise.
