= Keina Suda =

Japanese musician and singer-songwriter (born 1993)

Keina Suda 須田景凪
- Also known as: balloon
- Born: January 20, 1993 (age 33)
- Genres: J-pop; Rock
- Occupations: Singer; songwriter; Vocaloid musician
- Instruments: Vocals; Guitar; V Flower; Hatsune Miku; Kagamine Rin/Len
- Years active: 2013–present as balloon 2017–present as Keina Suda
- Labels: U&R (2017-2018); Unborde/WMG (2019-2023); A.S.A.B/Avex Inc. (2024–present)
- Website: https://www.tabloid0120.com/

Keina Suda (須田景凪, Suda Keina; born 20 January 1993) is a Japanese musician and singer-songwriter. He currently belongs to A.S.A.B, a sublabel of Avex Inc. Before 2017 he made music using Vocaloid and other related software under the name Balloon (バルーン, stylized as balloon).

== Life and career ==
=== Early life and beginnings ===
Keina Suda started playing drums in junior high. He wanted to be a studio musician and attended the Kunitachi College of Music, but soon dropped the drums in favor of the guitar. Feeling the limits of pursuing a career as a drummer, he sold all of his drum equipment, purchased a personal computer and a guitar, and taught himself songwriting.

=== 2013–2016: Vocaloid career as Balloon ===
In April 2013, about a month after he began composing, he uploaded his first work, "Zōkeigai" (造形街), to Nico Nico Douga. Starting in 2013, he began composing Vocaloid music under the name Balloon. In October 2016, he uploaded his most famous song, "Charles" (シャルル), which has been covered by several other singers, including Ado.

=== 2017–2019: Transition to Keina Suda and major debut ===
In October 2017, he announced he would start activities as a singer and songwriter under the name of "Keina Suda", a name closely resembling his real name. On January 31, 2018, he released his first album under the name Keina Suda, titled Quote. In March of the same year, he performed his first solo live concert at Shibuya WWW.

On January 16, 2019, he released his first EP under the title Teeter through unBORDE (a label under Warner Music Japan), marking his major debut.

On August 21, 2019, his second EP Porte was released. The EP featured "Moil", used as the theme song for the Ni no Kuni movie, and "veil", used as the ending theme for the anime adaptation of Fire Force. The release of Porte also coincided with his entire discography becoming available on subscription streaming services.

=== 2020–2022: Billow and continued Vocaloid success ===
His single "Alba" was released on June 5, 2020, serving as the theme song for the movie Wednesday Disappears. In December 2020, he released the music video for a new Balloon Vocaloid song, "Setsuna no Uzu" (刹那の渦), followed by a self-covered music video under his Keina Suda name. Both versions were later included on his first major album.

On February 3, 2021, Suda released his first major studio album, Billow. The album included 15 tracks, such as "Yururu", the theme song for the film The Endroll of the Nameless World, and a self-cover of "welp", a song he had previously provided to Shingo Katori.

In October 2021, he released the Vocaloid song "Pamela". The song achieved "Vocaloid Legend" status (1 million views on Niconico) in just 17 days, marking the second-fastest time to do so at that time. On March 28, 2022, he released the Vocaloid song "Nomad", which was written for the circle "25-Ji, Nightcord de." in the game Project Sekai: Colorful Stage! feat. Hatsune Miku. It became the first Vocaloid song to reach Legend status in 2022. In October 2022, "Pamela" won the special "Daisy Bell Award" at the MTV VMAJ 2022.

=== 2023–present: Ghost Pop, Fall Apart, and recent activities ===
On January 26, 2023, Suda announced his second major album Ghost Pop, which was released on May 24, 2023. The album featured 14 tracks, including "Mellow", the opening theme for the anime Skip and Loafer, as well as "Koi Kumo" and "Rakkaryūsui", which were used in the films To Every You I've Loved Before and To Me, the One Who Loved You. To support the album, he embarked on his first national tour, "Keina Suda TOUR 2023 'Ghost Pops'". In May 2023, he made his first appearance on the YouTube channel The First Take, performing a self-cover of "Charles" and his new song "Darling".

On January 8, 2024, he released "Utopia", written as the opening theme for the second season of the anime Tsukimichi: Moonlit Fantasy. Later that year, he released "April" for a d Anime Store commercial, and "You & Me" as the theme song for the drama I Fell in Love With All My Classmates. From June to July 2024, he held the "Keina Suda HALL TOUR 2024 'Artless'". In late 2024, he hosted his first split-bill event "MINGLE", inviting the bands Hitorie and Natori. During the event with Hitorie, he surprise-announced a collaboration song under his Balloon alias titled "WOLF", which was released on December 11.

On March 26, 2025, he released "Mirage", another song for the d Anime Store campaign. On April 16, 2025, he released the album Fall Apart, which featured five new arrangements of his classic Balloon songs by various artists who respect his work, alongside "WOLF". On April 19, he held his first open-air concert "Keina Suda LIVE 2025 'Kakasumi'" at the Hibiya Open-Air Concert Hall, performing 20 songs including the new track "Meme".

Throughout 2025, Suda continued releasing theme songs for various anime and media. On July 16, he released "Last Look", the opening theme for the rebroadcast of Assassination Classroom. On August 20, he released "Love" (ラブル), the opening theme for the anime I'm in Love with You. On October 1, to celebrate the 5th anniversary of Project Sekai: Colorful Stage!, he collaborated with syudou under the name syudou × Balloon to release the Hatsune Miku and flower duet "Pentatonic".

On November 19, 2025, he released the single "Meme". The music video was created by Avogado6, who notably distributed the raw video materials for fans to use until March 2026. A duet video of "Pentatonic" featuring syudou and Keina Suda was released on December 25, 2025.

On January 14, 2026, Suda released "Libera", the opening theme for the TV Tokyo drama Oretachi Bad Barbers. On January 25, he participated in syudou's "PENTATONIC" event at the Yokohama BUNTAI.

== Discography ==
=== Music released as Balloon ===
==== Albums ====
	Release date	Title	Tracklist	Remarks
Indie (U & R Records)
1st	25 April 2015	apartment	12 songs: 1. アルコーブ (Alcove); 2. ポートレート (Portrait); 3. 奇々怪々 (Strange and mysterious); 4. 真夜中の引力 (Midnight attraction); 5. モーダル (Modal); 6. 生活感 (Life feeling); 7. 愛及屋烏 (Doting Crow); 8. カフス (Cufflinks); 9. 夜の帳が落ちる (Night book falls); 10. 秋は暮れて疎ら (Autumn is dark and sparse); 11. アパートメント (Apartment); 12. アティック (Attic)	
2nd	21 August 2017	corridor	10 songs: 1. 雨とペトラ (Rain and Petra); 2. シャルル (Charles); 3. メーベル (Mable); 4. レディーレ (Ladyle); 5. のけものばけもの (Nokemono Bakemono); 6. esse 7. anthosyan 8. 愛月撤灯 (I love the moon without lights); 9. 夕染 (Dye the evening); 10. 私はあなたに (I to you)	

==== EP ====
	Release date	Title	Tracklist	Remarks
Indie (U & R Records)
1st	30 April 2016	Marble	8 songs: 1. トピアリー (Topiary); 2. 花瓶に触れた (Touched a vase); 3. Unseen; 4. ミラーリング (Mirroring); 5. 羊と隣人 (Sheep and Neighbor); 6. 朝を呑む (To take in the morning); 7. 閑話 (Quiet Story); 8. 雨に花束 (Bouquet of rain)	

==== Split album ====
	Release date	Title	Tracklist	Remarks
Indie (U & R Records)
1st	30 April 2017	facsimile	6 songs: 1. 退紅トレイン (Taiko Train) cover by balloon 2. krank balloon cover by balloon 3. felis 4. lupus 5. シャルル (Charles) cover by uki3 6. 雨とペトラ (Rain and Petra) cover by uki3	

=== Music released as Keina Suda ===
==== Singles ====
	Release date	Title	Remarks	First Album
Major (Unborde)
1st	24 January 2020	はるどなり (Harudonari)	Theme song for the Fuji TV drama "Alive: Oncologist's Medical Record".	Billow
2nd	24 April 2020	MUG		Billow
3rd	5 June 2020	Alba	Theme song for the movie "Wednesday Disappears."	Billow
4th	15 July 2020	Carol		Billow

==== Albums ====
	Release date	Title	Tracklist	Remarks
Indie (U & R Records)
1st	31 January 2018	Quote	10 songs: 1. morph 2. レド (Red); 3. idid 4. Cambell; 5. ポリアンナ (Polyanna); 6. 街灯劇 (Street lightshow); 7. シックハウス (Sick house); 8. アマドール (Amador); 9. 鳥曇り (Bird cloudy); 10. 密 (Dense)	
Major (Unborde)
2nd	3 February 2021	Billow	15 songs: 1. Vanilla; 2. 飛花 (Fly); 3. 刹那の渦 (Vortex of the moment); 4. Alba; 5. veil 6. Carol; 7. メメント (Memento); 8. MUG; 9. 迷鳥 (Stray Bird); 10. 風の姿 (Wind); 11. MOIL; 12. はるどなり (Harudonari); 13. welp 14. 色に出ず (Colorless); 15. ゆるる (Loose)	The song "Alba" is the theme song of the movie "Wednesday Disappears." The song "Veil" is the ending theme of the first season of Fire Force. The song "Carol" was featured in NHK's Minna no Uta. The song "Moil" was the theme song in the Ni no Kuni movie. The song "Harudonari" was the theme song of Alive: Oncologist's Medical Record. The song "Loose" is the theme song of the upcoming movie The End of the Tiny World.
3rd	24 May 2023	Ghost Pop	14 songs: 1. ラブシック (Lovesick); 2. メロウ (Mellow); 3. ダーリン (Darling); 4. バグアウト (Bug Out); 5. ノマド (Nomad) (self cover); 6. 落花流水 (Flowing Water); 7. 幼藍 (Young Blue); 8. Howdy; 9. パメラ (Pamela) (self cover); 10. 終夜 (All Night); 11. 雲を恋う (Love the Clouds); 12. いびつな心 (Distorted Heart); 13. 綺麗事 (Beautiful Things); 14. 美談 (Good Story)	The song "Mellow" is the opening theme of Skip and Loafer The song "Love the Clouds" is the theme song for the film To Every You I've Loved Before The song 'Rakka Ryusui' is an insert song of the anime film To Every You I've Loved Before

==== EP ====
	Release date	Title	Tracklist	Remarks
Major (Unborde)
1st	16 January 2019	teeter	6 songs: 1. mock 2. パレイドリア (Pareidolia); 3. farce 4. Dolly; 5. レソロジカ (Lethologica); 6. 浮花 (Fuka)	
2nd	21 August 2019	porte	5 songs: 1. 飛花 (veil); 2. 飛花 (MOIL); 3. 語るに落ちる (Talking); 4. 青嵐 (Blue Storm); 5. 飛花 (couch)	
