= Ai Hashimoto =

Japanese actress (born 1996)

- 橋本 愛
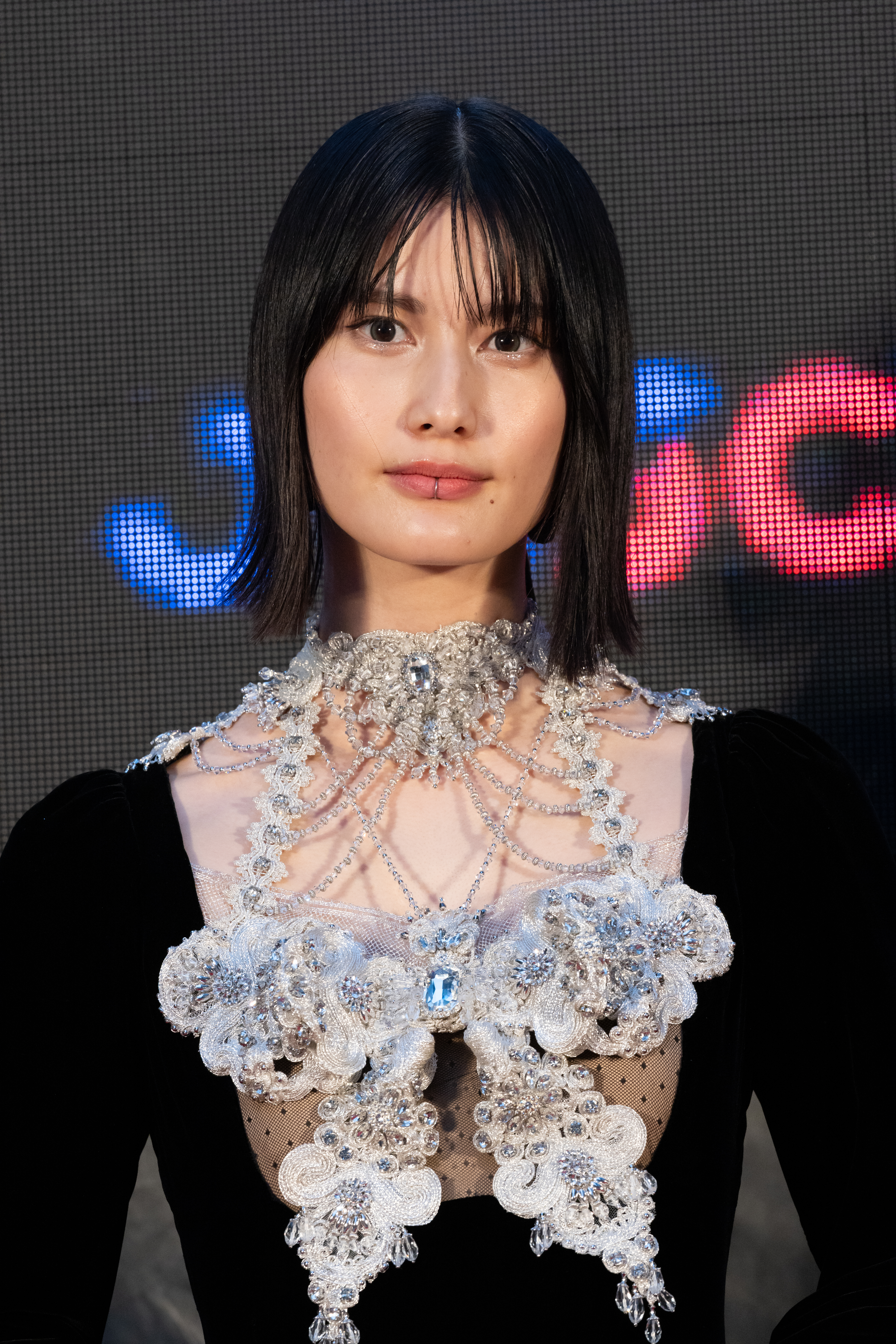
- Hashimoto at the 37th Tokyo International Film Festival in 2024
- Born: January 12, 1996 (age 30); Kumamoto, Japan
- Occupation: Actress
- Years active: 2008–present
- Agent: Eden

Ai Hashimoto (橋本 愛, Hashimoto Ai; born January 12, 1996) is a Japanese actress and singer.

== Early life and career ==
Hashimoto was born in Kumamoto, Kumamoto Prefecture, the second of three daughters. In 2008, Hashimoto won the HUAHUA audition held by Newcome; her mother had chosen Hashimoto for the audition because she had the strongest facial complexion out of the three sisters.

In 2009, Hashimoto was selected as the youngest "Miss Seventeen" by fashion magazine Seventeen, alongside Emi Kudo, Arisa Takada and Alice Hirose, out of 5,267 applicants. The same year, she debuted as an actress in the movie Give and Go, portraying a deaf girl who is absorbed in basketball.

Hashimoto appeared in Confessions in 2010 and starred in The Kirishima Thing in 2012, for which she won new face awards from the Japan Academy and Kinema Junpo. She also appeared as Sadako in Sadako 3D.

In 2024, Hashimoto was appointed Jury member at the 2024 Tokyo International Film Festival for its section 'International competition'. On December 31, she left Sony Music Artists and transferred to the new agency Eden.

== Filmography ==
=== Films ===
Year	Title	Role	Notes	Ref.
2010	Give and Go	Natsuki	Lead role	
2010	Confessions	Mizuki Kitahara		
2011	Control Tower	Mizuho Takimoto	Lead role	
2011	A Honeymoon in Hell: Mr. & Mrs. Oki's Fabulous Trip	Yoshiko		
2011	Avatar	Michiko Abukumagawa	Lead role	
2012	The Kirishima Thing	Kasumi		
2012	Sadako 3D	Sadako		
2012	Until the Break of Dawn	Misa Arashi		
2012	Soup	Chiaki Nishimura		
2012	Home: Itoshi no Zashiki Warashi	Azumi Takahashi		
2012	Blood-C: The Last Dark	Mana Hiiragi	Voice role	
2012	Another	Mei Misaki	Lead role	
2012	Bungo: Stories of Desire	Tomoyo	Lead role, segment Sushi	
2013	Goodbye Debussy	Haruka Kōzuki	Lead role	
2013	I'll Give It My All... Tomorrow	Suzuko Ōguro		
2013	Angel Home	Haruka Kunimura		
2014	The World of Kanako	Morishita		
2014	Little Forest: Summer & Autumn	Ichiko	Lead role	
2014	Parasyte: Part 1	Satomi Murano		
2014	Adult Drop	Anne Irie		
2015	Little Forest: Winter & Spring	Ichiko	Lead role	
2015	Wonderful World End	Shiori Hayano	Lead role	
2015	Parasyte: Part 2	Satomi Murano		
2016	The Shell Collector	Tsutako		
2016	Utsukushii Hito	Tōko	Lead role	
2016	The Inerasable	Ms. Kubo		
2016	Birthday Card	Noriko	Lead role	
2016	The Old Capital	Mai Sada		
2017	A Beautiful Star	Akiko		
2017	Parks	Jun	Lead role	
2018	It's Boring Here, Pick Me Up	I	Lead role	
2018	Oz Land	Yayoi Tamachi		
2019	21st Century Girl		Lead role; anthology film	
2020	Good-Bye	Keiko Mizuhara		
2020	Hold Me Back	Satsuki		
2022	xxxHolic	Zashiki-warashi		
2022	To Every You I've Loved Before	Kazune Takigawa (voice)		
2022	To Me, the One Who Loved You	Kazune Takigawa (voice)		
2024	After the Fever	Sanae	Lead role	
2024	Happiness	Tsukiko Kunikida		
2024	The Voices at War	Mieko Wada		
2024	The Hotel of My Dream	Sudō		
2025	As for Me	Kanako Saotome	Lead role	
2025	BAUS: The Ship's Voyage Continues	Hanae		
2025	Rewrite	Tomoe		
2025	After the Quake	Mina		
2026	The Mountain	Minami Kazuno	Lead role	
2027	Leviathan	Yuriko Momose		

=== Television ===
Year	Title	Role	Notes	Ref.
2012	Crime and Punishment: A Falsified Romance	Hikaru Baba		
2013	Hard Nuts	Kurumi Nanba	Lead role	
2013	Amachan	Yui Adachi	Asadora	
2014	All About My Siblings	Kazumi Nagahara		
2018	Segodon	Suga	Taiga drama	
2018	Dele	Yuriko	Episode 5	
2019	Idaten	Koume	Taiga drama	
2019	Nodoka no Niwa	Motoko Asahina	Lead role	
2019	Our Dearest Sakura	Yuri		
2020	Pareto's Miscalculation	Satomi Makino	Lead role	
2021	Sekai wo Kaeta Onnanoko	Ada Lovelace (voice)	Short drama	
2021	Reach Beyond the Blue Sky	Odaka Chiyo	Taiga drama	
2023	A Day-Off of Hana Sugisaki	Midori	Episodes 5 and 6	
2023	The Makanai: Cooking for the Maiko House	Momoko		
2024	Shinjuku Field Hospital	Mai Minami		
2025	After the Quake	Mina	Miniseries	
2025	Unbound	Tei	Taiga drama	
2026	Soul Mate	Sumiko Shinonome		

=== TV anime ===
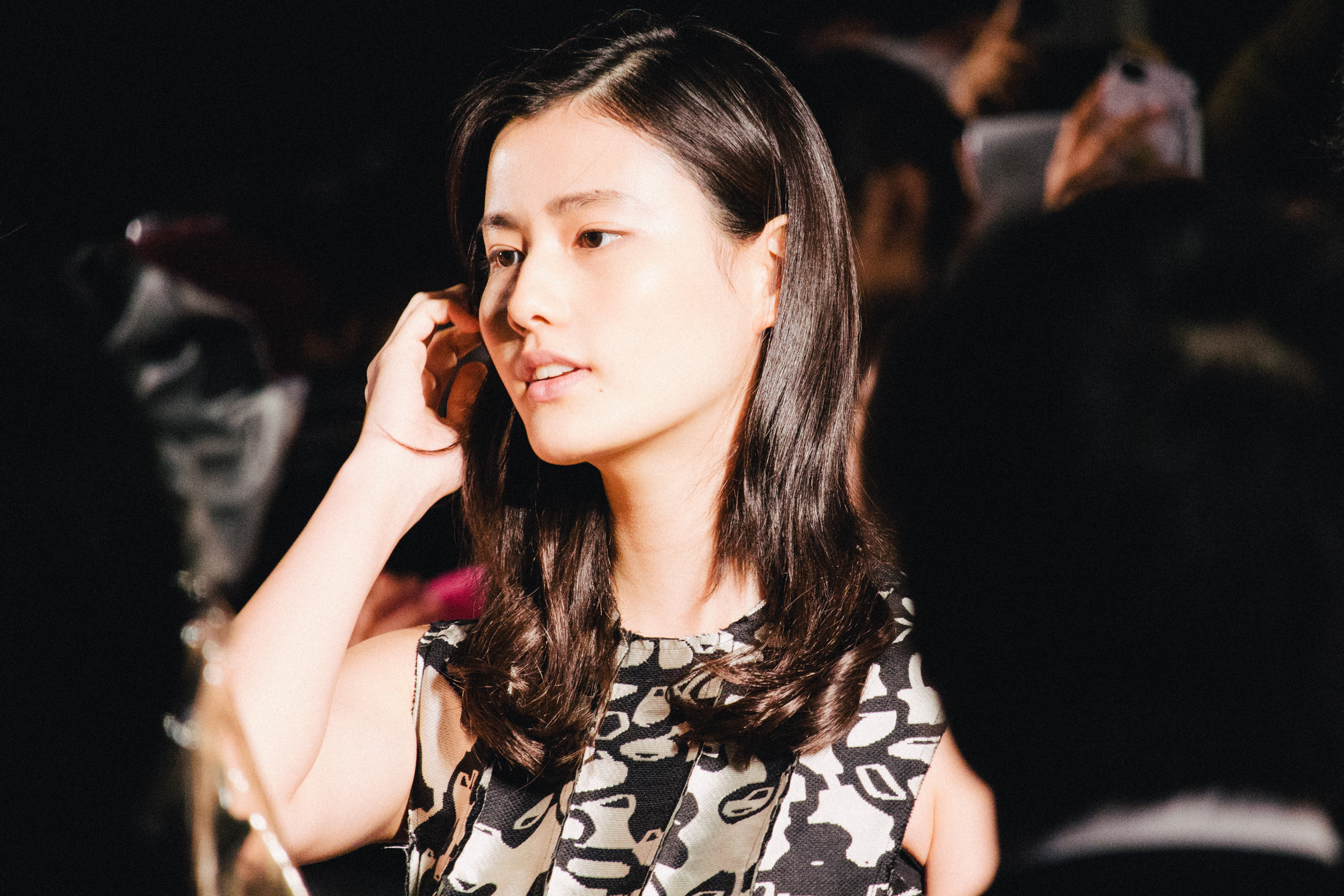
Hashimoto attending the 27th Tokyo International Film Festival in 2015

Year	Title	Role	Notes	Ref.
2020	Natsunagu!	Natsuna Keyaki	Lead role	

=== Radio ===
Year	Title	Role	Notes	Ref.
2020–21	Hashimoto Ai no Kokonishikanai Dokoka e	Host		

=== Dubbing ===
- The Flash (Kara Zor-El / Supergirl (Sasha Calle))

== Awards and nominations ==
Year	Award ceremony	Award	Result	Ref.
2013	34th Yokohama Film Festival	Best Newcomer	Won	
2013	86th Kinema Junpo Awards	Best New Actress	Won	
2013	36th Japan Academy Film Prize	Newcomer of the Year	Won	
2014	38th Elan d'or Awards	Newcomer of the Year	Won	
2018	72nd Mainichi Film Awards	Best Supporting Actress	Nominated	
