= Ken'ichi Kasai =

Japanese storyboard artist and director (born 1970)

Kenichi Kasai (カサヰ ケンイチ, Kasai Ken'ichi; born April 12, 1970 in Gifu Prefecture) is a Japanese storyboard artist and director. He is amongst J.C.Staff's most noted directors, having directed the highly rated Honey and Clover series. Beginning his career as a production manager, using his name in kanji, Kenichi Kasai (笠井 賢一), he moved on to direction with J.C.Staff. With 2002's Wagamama: Fairy Mirumo De Pon!, he began using his name in katakana.

== Filmography ==
=== Director ===
- Kuru Kuru Amī (2001)
- Wagamama Fairy: Mirumo De Pon! (2002–2005)
- Wagamama Fairy: Mirumo De Pon! Gōruden (2003)
- Major (2004–2006) – first and second seasons
- Honey and Clover (2005)
- Nodame Cantabile (2007) – first season
- Kimikiss: Pure Rouge (2007–2008)
- Sweet Blue Flowers (2009)
- Bakuman (2010–2013)
- Chōyaku Hyakunin isshu: Uta Koi (2012)
- Love Stage!! (2014)
- Wolf Girl and Black Prince (2014)
- Amanchu! (2016)
- The Thousand Musketeers (2018)
- To Me, the One Who Loved You (2022)

=== Other ===
- Cooking Papa (1992–1995) – production manager
- Bishōjo Senshi Sailor Moon Sailor Stars (1992–1997) – assistant director
- Mama Loves the Poyopoyo-Saurus (1995–1996) – assistant director and episode director
- Bakusō Kyōdai Let's & Go!! (1996–1998) – storyboards and episode director
- Cutie Honey F (1997–1998) – assistant director
- Anime Ganbare Goemon (1997–1998) – storyboards and episode director
- Ginga Hyōryū Vifam 13 (1998) – episode director
- Neo Ranga (1998–1999) – storyboards and episode director
- Kareshi Kanojo no Jijō (1998–1999) – storyboards and episode director
- Soreyuke! Uchū Senkan Yamamoto Yōko (1999) – episode director
- Ah! My Goddess: Being Small is Convenient (1999) – episode director
- Gokudō-kun Man'yūki (1999) – storyboards and episode director
- Majutsushi Orphen Revenge (1999–2000) – storyboards and episode director
- Jibaku-kun (1999–2000) – opening and ending theme director
- Daa! Daa! Daa! (2000–2002) – storyboards and episode director
- Toradora! (2008–2009) – storyboards and episode director
