= Hio Miyazawa =

Japanese actor and model (born 1994)

- 宮沢氷魚
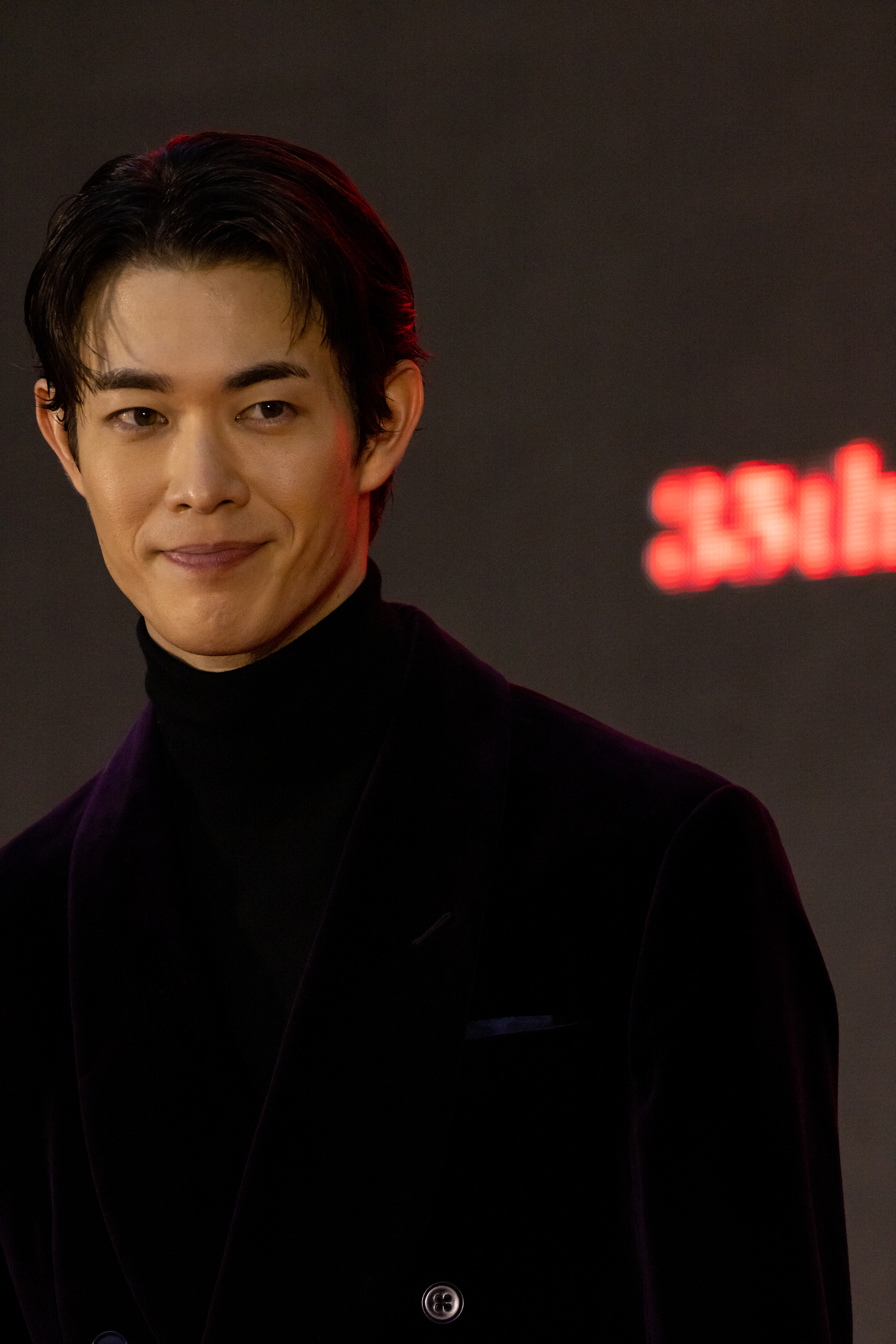
- Miyazawa in October 2022
- Born: April 24, 1994 (age 32); San Francisco, United States
- Occupations: Actor; Model
- Years active: 2015–present
- Agent: Les Pros Entertainment
- Partner: Yuina Kuroshima
- Children: 1
- Website: hio-miyazawa.com

Hio Miyazawa (宮沢 氷魚, Miyazawa Hio; born April 24, 1994) is an American-born Japanese actor and model. He was born in San Francisco, United States.

He is the son of musician Kazufumi Miyazawa and TV personality Dionne Mitsuoka.

== Biography ==
His father, musician Kazufumi Miyazawa is Japanese and his mother, TV personality Dionne Mitsuoka is half-American, which makes him a quarter American. He was born in California and was raised in Tokyo. He speaks English and Japanese. He likes fishing, baseball, and is a big fan of Yokohama DeNA BayStars. He studied at the University of California, Santa Cruz for two years then transferred to International Christian University from which he graduated in March 2017.

== Career ==
He started his career as an exclusive model for MEN'S NON-NO in 2015.

His first acting role was in the TBS drama Dr. Storks (Kōnodori) in 2017, as the new intern in the Obstetrics and Gynecology Department of Persona General Medical Center.

In 2018, he starred in the drama Kiss that Kills, which is his second acting role in his career. He got his first lead role in the NHK drama R134/The Promise at Shounan and was filmed in Yokohama, his mother's hometown. He also started to have roles in stage plays (BOAT and The Sea of Fertility) as well.

He got his first Shoujo manga drama adaptation role in the 2019 TV Asahi drama I give my first love to you (Boku no Hatsukoi wo Kimi ni Sasagu). In January 2019, it was announced that he will be in the stage play CITY together with Yagira Yuya.

Last February 7, 2019, it was announced that he will play the role of Amane Murasame in the movie Kakegurui.

26 April, two days after his 25th birthday, it was announced that he will be playing the role of Jyo Banno in the drama adaptation of Gisou Furin by Akiko Higashimura.

== Personal life ==
On January 16, 2024, Miyazawa announced through his official website that he is expecting his first child with actress Kuroshima Yuina. The couple also revealed that they had been in a relationship for quite some time. On July 12, 2024, they welcomed the birth of their first child.

== Filmography ==
=== Film ===
Year	Title	Role	Notes	Ref(s)
2019	Kakegurui – Compulsive Gambler	Amane Murasame	First movie role	
2020	His	Shun Igawa	Lead role	
2021	Kiba: The Fangs of Fiction	Hijiri Yashiro		
2021	Moonlight Shadow	Hitoshi		
2022	Goodbye Cruel World	Yano		
2022	To Every You I've Loved Before	Koyomi Takasaki (voice)	Lead role	
2022	To Me, the One Who Loved You	Koyomi Hidaka (voice)	Lead role	
2023	The Legend and Butterfly	Akechi Mitsuhide		
2023	Egoist	Ryūta		
2023	Spring in Between	Tōru Okunai	Lead role	
2024	52-Hertz Whales	Cikara Niina		
2025	Sato and Sato	Tamotsu Sato	Lead role	
2025	Kaede	Shigeru Kajino		

=== TV drama ===
Year	Title	Role	Notes	Ref(s)
2017	Dr. Storks	Goro Akanishi	First acting role	
2018	Kiss that Kills	Michinari Hotei		
2018	R134/The Promise at Shonan (R134/Shonan no Yakusoku)	Kota Suwa	First lead role	
2019	Secret Unrequited Love	Kou Suzuya		
2019	Fake Affair	Jyo Banno		
2019	Village of Eight Gravestones (Yatsu Hakamura)	Police officer	TV movie	
2020	Yell	Akira Kirishima	Asadora	
2021	Ann's Lyrics: Ann Sakuragi's Haiku Lessons	Subaru		
2021	Hoshi to Lemon no Heya	Ryo		
2021	Solomon's Perjury	Kazuhiko Kanbara		
2022	Chimudondon	Kazuhiko Aoyagi	Asadora	
2025	Unbound	Tanuma Okitomo	Taiga drama	
2025	Shiawase wa Tabete Nete Mate	Tsukasa Hajiro		
2025	Queen of Mars	Mito-D5946	Miniseries	

== TV shows ==
- Otona no Kiso Eigo Season 5(2016.4.-2017.4.|NHK ETV) - Yuta Morishima
- Kinyoubi Kurai Homeraretai (2016.11.4.-2018.3.30|BS ASAHI) - MC
- sumika no koshikake (2017.12.-2018.3.|Spaceshower TV) - Narrator
- sumika no koshikake Special Edition (2018.9., 2019.3.|Spaceshower TV) - Narrator, Guest Appearance

== Stage Play ==
-2018-

- BOAT (First lead role)
- The Sea of Fertility

-2019-

- CITY

-2020-

- Pizarro
- Anna Karenina(canceled due to covid-19)
- The Enemy

-2021-

- Pizarro

== Commercials ==
- JR SKI SKI (2017)
- BODY MAINTE (2019–2021)

== Music Videos ==
- Vanilla Beans|Onna wa Sore wo Gaman shinai (2015)
- sumika|Summer Vacation (2017)
- Ando Yuko|Ichinichi no Owari ni (2020)

== Awards and nominations ==
Year	Award	Category	Nominated work(s)	Result	Ref(s)
2020	45th Hochi Film Awards	Best New Artist	His	Won	
2021	42nd Yokohama Film Festival	Best Newcomer	His	Won	
2021	75th Mainichi Film Awards	Best New Actor	His	Nominated	
2021	63rd Blue Ribbon Awards	Best Newcomer	His	Nominated	
2022	45th Japan Academy Film Prize	Newcomer of the Year	Kiba: The Fangs of Fiction	Won	
2023	16th Asian Film Awards	Best Supporting Actor	Egoist	Won	
2023	36th Nikkan Sports Film Awards	Best Supporting Actor	Egoist	Nominated	
2023	36th Nikkan Sports Film Awards	Yūjirō Ishihara Newcomer Award	Egoist and Spring in Between	Won	
2024	78th Mainichi Film Awards	Best Supporting Actor	Egoist	Won	
2024	66th Blue Ribbon Awards	Best Supporting Actor	Egoist and The Legend and Butterfly	Nominated	
