= Saucy Dog =

Japanese rock band

Saucy Dog サウシードッグ
- Genres: Rock
- Years active: 2013–present
- Labels: Mash A&R; A-Sketch
- Members: Shinya Ishihara; Kazuki Akizawa; Yuika Seto
- Website: saucydog.jp

Saucy Dog (Japanese: サウシードッグ, Hepburn: Saushī Doggu) is a Japanese rock band formed in 2013. (Note: The band initially formed in 2013, but all of the members aside from Shinya Ishihara left in 2015. The two other current members joined in 2016.) The band consists of vocalist and guitarist Shinya Ishihara, bassist Kazuki Akizawa, and drummer Yuika Seto. They debuted with the extended play (EP) Country Road on May 24, 2017. Their song "Cinderella Boy" is one of the most streamed songs in Japan, accumulating over 540 million streams since its release in 2021.

== Members ==
- Shinya Ishihara (石原 慎也, Ishihara Shinya) – vocals, guitar
- Kazuki Akizawa (秋澤 和貴, Akizawa Kazuki) – bass
- Yuika Seto (せとゆいか, Seto Yuika) – drums
