= The First Slam Dunk =

2022 Japanese animated film by Takehiko Inoue

- Theatrical release poster
- Japanese: THE FIRST SLAM DUNK
- Directed by: Takehiko Inoue
- Screenplay by: Takehiko Inoue
- Based on: Slam Dunk by Takehiko Inoue
- Produced by: Toshiyuki Matsui
- Starring: Shugo Nakamura; Jun Kasama; Shinichiro Kamio; Subaru Kimura; Kenta Miyake
- Edited by: Ryuichi Takita
- Music by: Satoshi Takebe; Takuma Mitamura
- Animation by: Hideki Takahashi; (key animator); Kiyotaka Oshiyama; (key animator); Naoya Wada; (key animator); Souichirou Sako; (key animator); Tomoshige Inayoshi; (key animator)
- Backgrounds by: Nobuhito Sue; Eiko Tsunado
- Production companies: Toei Animation; DandeLion Animation Studio
- Distributed by: Toei Company, Ltd.
- Release date: December 3, 2022
- Running time: 124 minutes
- Country: Japan
- Language: Japanese
- Box office: $279 million

The First Slam Dunk (stylized in all caps) is a 2022 Japanese animated sports film written and directed by Takehiko Inoue, produced by Toei Animation and DandeLion Animation Studio. It is based on Inoue's Slam Dunk manga series. It was released theatrically in Japan on December 3, 2022.

In 2023, The First Slam Dunk won the Japan Academy Prize for Animation of the Year. The film grossed $279 million worldwide, becoming the sixth highest-grossing Japanese film and the highest grossing basketball film of all time.

== Synopsis ==
The film follows Ryota Miyagi, the point guard of Shohoku High School's basketball team. He had a brother, Sota, who was three years older than him and inspired his love for basketball. Ryota and his teammates Hanamichi Sakuragi, Takenori Akagi, Hisashi Mitsui, and Kaede Rukawa challenge the inter-high basketball champions, Sannoh Kogyo High School. The film adapts the final match depicted in the manga and features original flashbacks and a new epilogue, all centered on Ryota.

== Voice cast ==
Character	Japanese	English
Ryota Miyagi (宮城 リョータ, Miyagi Ryōta)	Shugo Nakamura	Paul Castro Jr.
Hisashi Mitsui (三井 寿, Mitsui Hisashi)	Jun Kasama	Jonah Scott
Kaede Rukawa (流川 楓, Rukawa Kaede)	Shinichiro Kamio	Aleks Le
Hanamichi Sakuragi (桜木 花道, Sakuragi Hanamichi)	Subaru Kimura	Ben Balmaceda
Takenori Akagi (赤木 剛憲, Akagi Takenori)	Kenta Miyake	Aaron Goodson
Haruko Akagi (赤木 晴子, Akagi Haruko)	Maaya Sakamoto	Abby Espiritu
Kiminobu Kogure (木暮 公延, Kogure Kiminobu)	Ryota Iwasaki	Zeno Robinson
Yohei Mito (水戸 洋平, Mito Yōhei)	Chikahiro Kobayashi	Yong Yea
Nozomi Takamiya (高宮 望, Takamiya Nozomi)	Masafumi Kobatake	Brent Mukai
Chuichirou Noma (野間 忠一郎, Noma Chūichirō)	Kenichirou Matsuda	River Vitae
Ayako (彩子, Ayako)	Asami Seto	Kelsey Jaffer
Mitsuyoshi Anzai (安西 光義, Anzai Mitsuyoshi)	Katsuhisa Hōki	Mike Pollock
Eiji Sawakita (沢北 栄治, Sawakita Eiji)	Shunsuke Takeuchi	Alan Lee

== Production ==
=== Development and pre-production ===
Back in 2003, Toshiyuki Matsui, a producer from Toei Animation, approached Inoue's office to ask if he was willing to make a Slam Dunk movie that would continue the story after where the TV anime left off. It was due to the popular reception of the anime's DVD box; however, the offer was rejected. Six years later, in 2009, Inoue's office approached Matsui and asked him to send a proposal regarding the project. Then, Matsui assembled a team led by Naoki Miyahara and Toshio Ohashi that, over a period of nearly 5 years, developed proposal prototype videos of the visual look that can be created using 3DCG, as it appeared to be more realistic to move the large number of characters together in the basketball court than hand-drawn 2D animation. The second prototype, which cost nearly as much as a whole movie, was rejected, as it strayed far off Inoue's vision and did not evoke that the characters were "alive". The third prototype, which had to be the final one, combined 3DCG with 2D animation, and it was the version that laid the infrastructure for Inoue's work as a director.

In December 2014, during a dinner with Matsui, Inoue gave the greenlight to the film. Matsui, then, suggested that Inoue should write the script and direct, as he was the person to be trusted the most with the characters' dialogue and their visual appearance and expression. After Inoue accepted, he began working on the script in January 2015. In 2018, work on the motion capture and models commenced.

=== Production ===
On January 6, 2021, Inoue suddenly announced on his Twitter account that the movie was in production. Then, on August 13, 2021, Inoue was revealed to be the screenwriter and director of the film, along with other production staff members such as Yasuyuki Ebara as character designer/animation director and Naoki Miyahara, Katsuhiko Kitada, Toshio Ohashi, Yasuhiro Motoda, Fumihiko Suganuma, and Haruka Kamatani as sequence directors.

On July 1, 2022, five new character posters were installed in theaters across Japan, where the release date of December 3, 2022, and the title The First Slam Dunk were officially announced. The official website of the film held interviews with multiple production staff members, where they shared their contribution to the film and Inoue's requests for the film. According to character designer/general animation director Yasuyuki Ebara, Inoue wanted the character designs to follow his recent illustrations shown in the new Slam Dunk Refurbished edition volumes released in 2018, instead of the older designs of the manga. The film's art director Kazuo Ogura and color designer Shiori Furusyo stated that Inoue wanted the movie to specifically feel as if the manga itself is in motion; therefore, he generally wanted a light and desaturated color palette. In addition, to make the backgrounds more manga-like, they had to look more hand-drawn and less realistic. Also, they mentioned that the movie was a blend of 3DCG for the basketball scenes and hand-drawn 2D animation for daily life scenes. Therefore, the film tries to bring the best of both worlds. On that note, CG director Daiki Nakazawa stated the same thing, but mentioned that there are some 2D basketball scenes where the animators used the motion capture for reference to portray basketball movements with much realism as possible. The movie, also, used the assistance of professional basketball players to review how the game was depicted.

When asked about his reason for involving himself in the film, Inoue stated that he was encouraged by the enthusiasm of the people who worked on the prototype versions and after seeing a good image of Sakuragi's face, he thought that getting himself involved would make it even better. He, also, stated that his main job as a director was to make sure that blood was injected into the characters and that they were brought to life. He corrected and retouched scenes, both in 3D and 2D, and drew multiple storyboards for the film. As for his aims regarding the story, he mentioned that he aimed for the film to be a new look into Slam Dunk, from a new perspective, where instead of focusing on a protagonist with endless possibilities and great potential, he wanted to focus on the perspective of living with pain and overcoming it. Therefore, he chose the title The First Slam Dunk, as it is a movie that wants the audience familiar with the story to experience it as if it was their first time, and those unfamiliar with it to have it be their first Slam Dunk experience. On the subject of changing the TV anime's voice actors, he stated that if he were to ask them to return, he would have asked them to throw away their perception and understanding of the characters that they professionally cultivated over the years, which is something he could not do. With the new voice actors, he put emphasis on the quality of their natural voices more than their acting skills.

== Music ==
- Opening theme song: "Love Rockets" by the Birthday
- Ending theme song: "Dai-Zero Kan" (第ゼロ感) by 10-Feet

== Release ==
The first teaser trailer of The First Slam Dunk was released on July 7, 2022; and a full trailer was released on November 4, 2022. The film was released theatrically in Japan by Toei Company on December 3, 2022, through regular and IMAX screenings. The theatrical run ended on August 31, 2023. However, the film returned for a single day on January 23, 2024. It was also returned to more than 300 theaters nationwide on August 13, 2024.

The film was released in theaters across the United States and Canada by GKIDS on July 28, 2023. It was released in cinemas in the United Kingdom, Ireland, and Malta on August 30, 2023, by Anime Limited and Toei Animation Europe.

In the Philippines, The First Slam Dunk was released by Pioneer Films on February 1, 2023. In Italy, the film was released on May 11, 2023, both in subtitled Japanese and in Italian dubbed versions. In India, the film was released by PVR Inox Pictures on July 7, 2023. The film was released in Spain on July 7, 2023, with versions dubbed in Spanish and Catalan. In Latin America, the movie had screenings in its subtitled Japanese version and also dubbed in neutral Spanish, using most of the original cast of the TV anime. The film was released in Mexico on July 27, 2023, and other Latin American countries on August 3.

=== Home video ===
The First Slam Dunk was released on home video in Japan on February 28, 2024. Through its various editions, the Blu-ray release held the top four positions on Oricon's Weekly Blu-ray Disc Ranking, marking the first time a single work has done so in its history. GKIDS released the film on home video in North America on June 25, 2024.

== Reception ==
=== Box office ===
The First Slam Dunk grossed $279 million worldwide; including over ¥15.74 billion ($112 million) grossed in Japan, making it the highest-grossing domestic film in Japan in 2023 and the sixth highest-grossing anime film of all time. The film debuted at number one at the domestic box office, grossing over ¥1.296 billion ($9.5 million) during its first two days. The film remained at the top spot in its second and third weekends, grossing over ¥825 million ($6 million) and ¥547 million ($3.99 million).

In South Korea, the film sold 3,818,000 tickets and grossed more than $30.38 million by March 2023, surpassing 2016's Your Name to become the highest-grossing anime film of all time in the country. By April 2023, the film has sold over 4.5 million tickets and grossed over $35.5 million in South Korea. It is the second highest-grossing film of 2023 in South Korea, surpassed only by another anime film, Suzume. In China, the film topped the box office with a record $56 million opening weekend, beating the Jackie Chan film Ride On as well as The Super Mario Bros. Movie. The First Slam Dunk set several opening records in China, including the highest pre-sales for an animated import. Its IMAX opening weekend of CN¥38 million is also the highest for a foreign animated film in China. As of April 30, it has made $75.8 million in China.

In North America, The First Slam Dunk earned over $625,000 in its opening weekend at the box office. In Chile, it debuted at the top of the box office, surpassing Barbie and Oppenheimer, blockbusters released two weeks prior.

=== Critical response ===
On the review aggregator website Rotten Tomatoes, the film has an approval of 100%, based on 47 reviews, with an average rating of 8.2/10. The site's consensus is "A heart-pumping, breathtaking, wonderfully crafted manga adaptation, The First Slam Dunk shoots and scores." Metacritic, which uses a weighted average, assigned the film a score of 79 out of 100, based on 10 critics, indicating "generally favorable" reviews.

Alicia Haddick from Anime News Network praised the film and gave it a B−, and described it as "The First Slam Dunk, a story about the last slam dunk, is everything a megafan of the franchise could dream of. No wonder it's been such a runaway success at the Japanese box office. Those who can't name the Shōhoku High School starting lineup by heart may leave the theater quietly satisfied. Delivers the tension of a sports anime, offers just enough for long term fans." Calum Marsh from The New York Times described the film as an excellent adaptation of the original manga series, written "The First Slam Dunk is a great basketball movie because it understands what's great about basketball, this feels like real basketball. When a character catches a pass, drives toward the paint, steps back, squares up and releases a clutch 3-pointer, the movie slows time, drops the sound and homes in on exactly the right detail — the perfect, crystalline swish of the ball passing through the basket and gently grazing the net. The flashbacks are well-written and add off-the-court dramatic interest, but it's the basketball action that is the movie's claim to excellence. Expertly staged and beautifully rendered using a combination of computer-generated imagery and traditional hand-drawn animation, it's often so spectacular that I am eager to watch again." Rafael Motamayor from IGN also praised the film and gave it 9/10, and described it as "The film delivers an exhilarating basketball game full of the thrills and drama of an NBA final, with mind-blowing visuals and camera angles live-action couldn't replicate. Takehiko Inoue remixes his own manga to deliver a fresh new experience for longtime fans, as well as the best introduction to this '90s classic for newcomers. The First Slam Dunk delivers a high-octane thrilling sports anime film with mind-blowing animation that serves as a great conclusion and introduction to a classic '90s anime."

=== Accolades ===
The First Slam Dunk was awarded the Japan Academy Prize for Animation of the Year at the 46th Japan Academy Film Prize in 2023. The film won the Okawa-Fukiya Award at the Niigata International Animation Film Festival 2023. Toshiyuki Matsui, the producer of the film, received the Grand Prize of the 42nd annual Fujimoto Awards for his work on the film. The film won the Best Animated Feature Film, and third place in Audience Award category at the 27th annual Fantasia International Film Festival in 2023. At the Newtype Anime Awards, The First Slam Dunk took third place in Best Picture (Film). The film was nominated for Best Animated Feature Film at the 16th Asia Pacific Screen Awards. It was one of 33 animated films submitted for Best Animated Feature for the 96th Academy Awards, but failed to get shortlisted. Kôji Kasamatsu, for his work in sound design, was nominated for a Technical Achievement Award at the 44th UK London Film Critics Circle Awards.

The First Slam Dunk was awarded the Best Newcomer Award and the Yujiro Ishihara Award at the 36th Nikkan Sports Film Awards. It was also awarded the Tokyo Anime Award Festival for Animation of the Year (Feature Film). The manga artist, Takehiko Inoue, also awarded the Best Original Story/Screenplay and Best Director, while Daiki Nakazawa won Best Background/Coloring/Visual Category award for their work. The film was nominated for Best Film at the 8th Crunchyroll Anime Awards in 2024. It won the 2024 AMD Chairman Award at Japan's 29th annual Association of Media in Digital (AMD) Awards, Synergy Award at the 18th Seiyu Awards. It also won Daruma for Best Feature Film at the Japan Expo Awards.

Year	Award	Category	Recipient	Result	Ref.
2023	46th Japan Academy Film Prize	Animation of the Year	The First Slam Dunk	Won	
2023	Niigata International Animation Film Festival	Okawa-Fukiya Award	The First Slam Dunk	Won	
2023	42nd Fujimoto Awards	Grand Prize	Toshiyuki Matsui	Won	
2023	27th Fantasia International Film Festival	Best Animated Feature Film	The First Slam Dunk	Won	
2023	27th Fantasia International Film Festival	Best Animated Feature – Audience Award	The First Slam Dunk	3rd place	
2023	13th Newtype Anime Awards	Best Picture (Film)	The First Slam Dunk	3rd place	
2023	16th Asia Pacific Screen Awards	Best Animated Feature Film	The First Slam Dunk	Nominated	
2023	36th Nikkan Sports Film Awards	Best Newcomer	Takehiko Inoue	Won	
2023	36th Nikkan Sports Film Awards	Yujiro Ishihara Award	The First Slam Dunk	Won	
2024	44th London Film Critics' Circle Awards	Technical Achievement Award	Kôji Kasamatsu (sound design)	Nominated	
2024	Tokyo Anime Award Festival	Animation of the Year	The First Slam Dunk	Won	
2024	Tokyo Anime Award Festival	Best Original Story/Screenplay	Takehiko Inoue	Won	
2024	Tokyo Anime Award Festival	Best Director	Takehiko Inoue	Won	
2024	Tokyo Anime Award Festival	Best Background/Coloring/Visual	Daiki Nakazawa	Won	
2024	8th Crunchyroll Anime Awards	Best Film	The First Slam Dunk	Nominated	
2024	8th Crunchyroll Anime Awards	Best Voice Artist Performance (Italian)	Diego Baldoin as Takenori Akagi	Nominated	
2024	29th AMD Awards	AMD Chairman Award	The First Slam Dunk	Won	
2024	18th Seiyu Awards	Synergy Award	The First Slam Dunk	Won	
2024	38th Japan Gold Disc Award	Animation Album of the Year	The First Slam Dunk	Won	
2024	Japan Expo Awards	Daruma for Best Feature Film	The First Slam Dunk	Won	
2025	Music Awards Japan	Best J-Rock Song	"Dai-Zero Kan" by 10-Feet	Nominated	
2025	Music Awards Japan	Best Anime Song	"Dai-Zero Kan" by 10-Feet	Nominated	

== Potential sequel ==
When asked about a potential sequel to the movie, Inoue left the door open to it, but refused to say anything about it.

== See also ==
- List of basketball films
