= The Lyosacks Movie =

- Promotional release poster
- Directed by: Alvaro Calmet
- Written by: Alvaro Calmet
- Based on: The Lyosacks by Alvaro Calmet
- Produced by: Alvaro Calmet
- Starring: Alvaro Calmet; Jon Bailey; Yong Yea
- Edited by: Alvaro Calmet
- Music by: Jose Varón
- Distributed by: YouTube
- Release date: July 26, 2020
- Running time: 70 minutes
- Countries: Peru; Canada
- Language: English

The Lyosacks Movie is a 2020 animated science fiction action comedy film written, produced, co-starred, edited, animated and directed by Alvaro Calmet in his directorial debut, based on his own web series of the same name. It is set in an alien invasion where the trio of friends must decide whether to face them alongside their mortal enemy, Dr. Yequil, or hand him over to the invaders.

== Synopsis ==
Faced with an alien invasion, those who demand the surrender of Dr. Yequil, the most intelligent child in the world, The Lyosacks will face the moral dilemma of handing over their mortal enemy, or fighting at his side.

== Voice cast ==
- Aaron Nield as Evil Dr. Yequil
- Julian Dorra as Ray Osbourne / Future Ray
- Yong Yea as Vince Ackerman
- Alvaro Calmet as Alec Lynch / Future Alec
- Emily Mack as Emmy Ackerman
- Shady Dorra as Ozzy Larzarus
- Lizel Jackson as Jannice Morettini
- Maks Baumann as Albert Schultz
- Benny Botros as Andrew Schultz
- Carrie Johnston as Area 51 Lady
- Anthony Dimascio as Area 51 Dude
- Jae Choi as Blue Skull Boss
- Jon Bailey as Alien King / News Anchor
- Ryan George as Alien Duo
- Jessi Milestone as Mrs. Yequil
- Patrick Muñoz as Mr. Gonzalez
- Annette Calmet as News Anchor
- Harry Sargent as Cop
- Regine Calmet as Mrs. President
- Karem Mohamed as KSic
- Kai Dorra as Mr. Schultz
- Carina Diana as Mrs. Schultz
- Lucas Tatro as Young Alec
- Joe Hasper as Young Andrew
- Matt Glaudel as Young Albert
- Jason Zumwalt as Don Morettini
- Calvin Clerk as Butler
- Axel Calmet as President Bodyguard
- David Kovar as Area 51 Computer Guy
- Collin Smith as Area 51 Soldier / Blue Skull Members

== Financing ==
The film was financed through a crowdfunding campaign on Indiegogo and Calmet's own media.

== Release ==
The Lyosacks Movie was released for free on July 26, 2020, on the series' YouTube channel.
