= Larry (Pokémon) =

Fictional video game character

- Pokémon character
- Larry from Pokémon Scarlet and Violet
- First appearance: Pokémon Scarlet and Violet (2022)
- Voiced by: English: Yong Yea (Pokémon Masters EX); Benjamin Diskin (TV series); Japanese: Kōsuke Toriumi (TV series) Kenyu Horiuchi (Pokémon Masters EX)

Larry, known as Aoki (Japanese: アオキ) in Japan, is a character in Nintendo and Game Freak's Pokémon media franchise. Introduced in Pokémon Scarlet and Violet, he serves as both a Gym Leader and an Elite Four member in the game's setting, specializing in Normal and Flying-type Pokémon. He is designed to depict a stereotypical Japanese salaryman, and is known for his expressionless dialogue and personality. Larry is one of the strongest trainers due to his dual role as both a Gym Leader and as an Elite Four member, he simultaneously masters two separate typings in the game. In the anime, he is voiced by Kōsuke Toriumi in Japanese and by Benjamin Diskin in English, while in the Pokémon Masters EX video game he is voiced by Kenyu Horiuchi in Japanese and by Yong Yea in English.

Since Larry's introduction into the series, Larry has received a highly positive critical response, being highlighted as relatable. He has also been described as a breakout character.

== Concept and design ==
Developed by Game Freak and published by Nintendo, the Pokémon franchise began in Japan in 1996 with the release of the video games Pokémon Red and Blue for the Game Boy. In these games, the player assumes the role of a Pokémon Trainer whose goal is to capture and train creatures called Pokémon. Players use the creatures' special abilities to combat other Pokémon, both in the wild as well as those used by other Trainers. Created for the 2022 sequels Pokémon Scarlet and Violet, Larry is a "Gym Leader", a type of Trainer that acts as a boss players must defeat to proceed. He also acts as an Elite Four member, serving as one of the four opponents that must be battled prior to the battle against the Top Champion. Larry is depicted as a tall, middle-aged man, who has square black pupils with rectangular eyes and eyebrows. He has prominent eyebags and cheekbones. Larry has black hair with gray quiffs. He is always seen holding his worn out briefcase and his main attire consists of a black suit with a sky blue tie which has a cloud pattern. During the Elite Four battle, Larry wears black gloves that has an outline of a compass. Larry has been voiced in the Pokémon animated series by Kōsuke Toriumi in Japanese and by Benjamin Diskin in English.

== Appearances ==
Larry is a middle-aged Gym Leader in Medali, a town in the Paldea region in Pokémon Scarlet and Violet. He is described as bland and deadpan, yet an apathetic, tired, overworked, professional, brooding, humble, and emotionally detached, Japanese salaryman. Larry refuses to embrace Paldea's vibrant culture, and maintains his belief that "simplicity is strongest", regarding how he approaches his role as a businessman, Gym Leader and an Elite Four member. Larry is not passionate about Pokémon battling and treats it like it's a part of his workload. He is showcased to greatly enjoy eating out as illustrated by his battle arena being the Treasure Eatery, this is further established by his gym challenge where the player is supposed to find hints to figure out the secret menu item. Larry has a strong affinity towards maintaining a simple, normal, and ordinary life. He is shown to connect with Normal-type Pokémon in a much more personal level, as he himself believes that they are just as ordinary as he is. Larry's day job is working as a businessman for the Pokémon League in Paldea. He specializes in Normal-type Pokémon in the first battle, and serves as the third Elite Four member specializing in Flying-type Pokémon. He can be rematched once more in the postgame, once again using his Normal-type team, and can also be rematched in the Indigo Disk DLC expansion for the game. Larry's main overall Pokémon is his Staraptor that has appeared in all of his battles. Larry's main Pokémon in the Elite Four battle is his Flamigo. Larry also appears as a card in the Pokémon Trading Card Game, first introduced in the Japanese set "Raging Surf." Larry later appears in the Pokémon Horizons anime series. He also appears in the gacha game Pokémon Masters EX as a duo with Dudunsparce, added to the game in June 2024.

== Reception ==
Jenni Lada of Siliconera praised Larry, stating how expressive and distinct he is from other Pokémon characters: "However, while he isn't as immediately flashy or memorable at a glance, the character development surrounding him is extraordinary. There's so much personality there, even with as few interactions as a person gets, and it makes him one of the best characters in the game." She opined that characters like Larry do not need to be "flashy" to be well received, describing how they provide a comforting feeling. TheGamer's Ben Sledge posited similar ideas, citing Larry as a relatable character. Larry has been described as a breakout character due to his popularity among fans of the series.

Kotaku's Kenneth Shepard stated that "The work/life balance conversation woven throughout Larry's story is the single most pronounced example of an ongoing thread throughout Scarlet and Violet," citing that, "Where in other Pokémon regions like Galar gym leaders are treated with a hint of celebrity, or like professional athletes, the Paldea region seems to undervalue their contributions... Larry's outright disdain for the whole capitalist process has made him analogous to characters like Squidward from SpongeBob SquarePants, and fans have taken the comparison and run with it." He further states that "Larry's disgruntled worker persona has made him a bridge between Pokémon fans young and old. Where the kids find him a silly guy who gives them a challenging fight, adult fans familiar with the soul-crushing weight of the daily grind have found a kindred spirit. Who among us doesn't know what it's like to hate their job, hate their boss, but still suck it up and do what we're paid for so we can just go home and enjoy a little peace amid this capitalist hellscape? He is, as the kids say, "just like me, for real." He was praised as a highly unique character due to his realistic worldview. His dialogue has led to discussion about the in-universe position of Gym Leader being a fictional equivalent to a low paying yet important job. Destructoid's Timothy Monbleau named Larry his favorite character of 2022, citing Larry as a highlight for adult fans of the series, praising his relatability.

His blandness and lack of uniqueness have also been popular. His personality, despite appearing one-note at first glance, has been highlighted for its surprising depth. Thomas Greatorex of GameRant cited that "Larry is a brilliant example of how to create an iconic Pokemon Gym Leader without the need for pompous outfits or unrealistic exchanges, instead leaning into real-world tropes to tell a subtle story that many players wish they couldn't relate to as much as they do." Larry has also been the subject of shipping, in which two fictional characters are paired into a romantic relationship by fans. He was primarily shipped with the character Rika, another Elite Four member in Scarlet and Violet. The popularity behind the ship was cited to multiple factors, primarily due to the highly contrasting personalities of Rika and Larry, as Rika is primarily depicted with a more active and sometimes aggressive personality in contrast to Larry's calm and disgruntled demeanor. The popularity of both characters was also cited as a reason for its popularity, which has inspired a large amount of fanwork, such as fanart and fanfiction.
