= List of Slam Dunk characters =

The Shohoku High School basketball team along with other students from Shohoku, as seen at the end of the manga

The manga and anime series Slam Dunk features a cast of fictional characters created by Takehiko Inoue. The series takes place in Japan, with the main characters being high school basketball players from Kanagawa Prefecture.

== Creation and conception ==
Inoue became inspired to make Slam Dunk as he had liked basketball since high school. With the series, Inoue wants to demonstrate the feelings of an athlete such as their thoughts when they win, lose or improve at their sport. As part of the character development, Inoue wants the readers to experience achievements as well as love for the sport. Inoue's own basketball experience also influenced the story: when he was younger he started playing basketball to be popular with girls, but later became obsessed with the sport. This is mirrored in the character of Hanamichi Sakuragi, who starts playing basketball to impress the girl he likes.

== Basketball teams ==
=== Shohoku High School ===
Shohoku High School (湘北高等学校, Shōhoku Kōtō Gakkō) has long been regarded as an underdog and a one-man team solely dependent on team captain Takenori Akagi, with no competition success whatsoever even at the prefectural level for two years running. It is not until Akagi's third and final year in the team that things begin to turn around for Shohoku, and they start to become a team to be reckoned with. They are the only non-seeded team to make it to the final four of the Kanagawa Inter-high Tournament, their sole loss being against eventual prefecture champion Kainan. Despite being the runner-up representative for Kanagawa, they are ranked as a C-class team and placed into a tough tournament bracket during the national championship, facing Toyotama and the reigning champion Sannoh. Shohoku favors a run and gun style of play and have a wide breadth of offensive capabilities. However, their major weakness is their weak bench, and as a result must rely completely on their starting lineup.

==== Hanamichi Sakuragi ====
Voiced by: Takeshi Kusao (anime), Subaru Kimura (The First Slam Dunk) (Japanese); Robert Tinkler (anime), Ben Balmaceda (The First Slam Dunk) (English)

Hanamichi Sakuragi (桜木 花道, Sakuragi Hanamichi) is the main protagonist of Slam Dunk, serving as Shohoku's power forward.^{[ch. 171]} His jersey number is 10 and he is a freshman (grade ten) at Shohoku High. At the beginning of the series, Sakuragi is a slacker, good for nothing other than fighting. He is the leader of the feared Sakuragi Legion, which consists of his four friends Mito, Noma, Ohkusu and Takamiya. After being rejected fifty times by girls during junior high school, Sakuragi meets and falls in love with Haruko Akagi, a basketball fangirl who is also in grade ten.^{[ch. 1]} This and Haruko's encouragement lead him to join the Shohoku basketball team. However, as a complete beginner, he is not able to keep up with the rest of the team despite his outstanding height, athleticism, stamina, speed and leaping ability. He regards himself as a "genius" though, with self-confidence that borders on arrogance. Sakuragi's most recognizable trait is his red hair, though he later shaves his head as reparation for an error that led to a loss in the Interhigh Tournament against Kainan.^{[ch. 133]}

==== Takenori Akagi ====
Voiced by: Kiyoyuki Yanada (anime), Megumi Ogata (young; anime), Kenta Miyake (The First Slam Dunk) (Japanese); Martin Roach (anime), Aaron Goodson (The First Slam Dunk) (English)

Takenori Akagi (赤木 剛憲, Akagi Takenori) is Haruko's older brother, serving as Shohoku's captain and center. His jersey number is 4, and he is a senior (grade twelve) at Shohoku. Along with Kogure, he is the only other player who stayed on the Shohoku basketball team for all three years. Before he met the current Shohoku members, he had to overcome ridicules from his classmates (for dreaming of winning the national championship), doubts from bystanders, and the frustration of losing his teammates, as they found Akagi's training regime to be too difficult and harsh.

Despite not thinking too much of Hanamichi Sakuragi (who addresses him as "Gori" due to his immense physical presence) at first, he realizes Sakuragi's potential as a basketball player. Serious and disciplined, Akagi's dream is to lead Shohoku to the national championship. His determination is shown in the match against Kainan during the Kanagawa Interhigh Tournament, where he played on despite a serious injury to his ankle. Akagi considers Ryonan's Jun Uozumi to be his biggest rival, though their rivalry is not antagonistic.

Akagi was aware of Sakuragi's crush on Haruko, which made him feel irritated over Sakuragi's advances towards Haruko in some times they were both together. He was also irritated at Sakuragi calling him "Gori", and his antics at court and off-court. Despite so, his relationship with Sakuragi was not entirely antagonistic. He had a caring side beneath his roughness, as shown when he consoled Sakuragi, who cried when Shohoku lost to Kainan by a narrow margin of 2 points (the match's final score was 90–88, with Kainan winning Shohoku by 2 points).

Regarded as the best center in the Kanagawa Prefecture, Akagi plays as a fairly typical center, using his height and power to score close to the basket. He also has a reputation for being a virtually unbeatable defender. He is also the most academically talented starter and is considered a model student. Before the final four of the Kanagawa Inter-high Tournament, the other four have to beg their teachers to be given the chance to retake some exams they had flunked, otherwise they would have been academically disqualified from playing in the national championship. Akagi, together with Ayako and Haruko helps the four in reviewing for their make up exams in which they pass.

==== Kiminobu Kogure ====
Voiced by: Hideyuki Tanaka (anime), Ryota Iwasaki (The First Slam Dunk) (Japanese); Christopher Ralph (anime), Zeno Robinson (The First Slam Dunk) (English)

Kiminobu Kogure (木暮 公延, Kogure Kiminobu) is Shohoku's vice-captain, backup shooting guard, and a good friend of Akagi and Mitsui. His jersey number is 5, and along with Akagi, is also a senior at Shohoku High. Akagi and Kogure are friends and teammates from their middle school years. Originally Kogure started playing basketball to increase his stamina, but he grew to love the game as he played alongside Akagi. He and Akagi are the only two players who have been on the team for all three years, as Mitsui left during their first year, and other players quit the team because they found Akagi's training regimen to be too strenuous. It was Kogure who inspired Akagi to continue on his journey to national championship, when Akagi thought about giving it all up after being insulted by his classmates.

Alongside Miyagi and Ayako, Kogure consistently works to bring out the best in Sakuragi's talent. Gentle, empathetic, and friendly, he is rarely seen without his glasses, earning him the nickname "Megane-kun," or "glasses-wearing guy," from Sakuragi. Although he spends much of his time on the bench, Kogure provides experience and reliable scoring when he plays, often replacing one of the starters. While he lacks the natural talent of Akagi or Mitsui, his years of rigorous training with Akagi since middle school have made him a dependable player.

==== Hisashi Mitsui ====
Voiced by: Ryōtarō Okiayu (anime), Jun Kasama (The First Slam Dunk) (Japanese); Jonah Scott (The First Slam Dunk) (English)

Hisashi Mitsui (三井 寿, Mitsui Hisashi) is the starting shooting guard of the Shohoku team.^{[ch. 171]} His number is 14 and he was able to return as a senior at Shohoku High. Before the beginning of the series, he was the MVP in his final year at Takeishi Junior High. Despite being offered the opportunity to join more prestigious high schools like Ryonan, he chose to go to Shohoku because of Coach Mitsuyoshi Anzai. Anzai had given him the courage to win in the Junior High tournament by encouraging him during the last seconds of the match. However, an injury to his left knee in a training session in his first year at Shohoku interrupts his basketball career. An imprudent early return to the court severely compounded the injure in that knee, leading to a basketball hiatus of over a year. Although he eventually healed, Mitsui was embittered by his exclusion from the court and quits basketball to become the leader of a delinquent gang.

His gang fights with Ryota Miyagi during the latter's first year, and during one such fight, Miyagi beats Mitsui senseless before taking a beating himself, knocking out a few of Mitsui's frontal teeth and leaving the both of them hospitalized until after the practice match against Ryonan. Mitsui attempts to ruin the basketball team by instigating them into fighting with his gang, as the team would have been suspended from participating the Inter-high Tournament by school for fighting. In the end, Hanamichi Sakuragi's gang and Mitsui's friend Norio Hotta voluntarily take blame for the fight. When Mitsui meets Anzai again, all his adamant, seemingly unrelenting thoughts of revenge had vanished immediately and replaced by remorse; he tearfully begs to rejoin the team and vows never to fight again.

Mitsui is best known on the team as a three-pointer specialist, only matched by Jin from Kainan. His three-pointers help Shohoku catch up when they are 12 points down against Shoyo, and again when the team was 20 points down against Sannoh in the national championships. His defensive ability while playing center completely shut down Sakuragi during a practice match as well as Fukuda in the match against Ryonan. His greatest weakness, though, is his lack of stamina due to his long break from basketball. Thus, in the latter halves of games, he has not always been as reliable. Mitsui becomes the vice-captain after Akagi and Kogure graduate school and leave the team. At the end of the manga, instead of preparing for the college entrance exams he stays with the team for the winter tournament in an attempt to earn an athletic scholarship because he feels he is not smart enough to pass the exams.

==== Ryota Miyagi ====
Voiced by: Yoku Shioya (anime), Shugo Nakamura (The First Slam Dunk), Miyuri Shimabukuro (young; The First Slam Dunk) (Japanese); Paul Castro Jr. (The First Slam Dunk) (English)

Ryota Miyagi (宮城 リョータ, Miyagi Ryōta) is the point guard of the Shohoku team.^{[ch. 171]} His jersey is number 7 and he is in grade eleven at Shohoku High. After an initial misunderstanding that caused conflict between them, both Miyagi and Sakuragi found comradeship in the fact that they had both been unlucky in love, although Miyagi, having only been rejected 10 times, still falls short of Sakuragi's record of 50 rejections. Like Sakuragi, Miyagi is motivated to play by his love for a girl: his best friend and classmate Ayako, the manager of the team, whom he refers to as "Aya-chan". He has been known to pose for Ayako during matches. Off-court, Miyagi has a reputation for being a bad boy. He was hospitalized for a while after his fight against Hisashi Mitsui's gang.

Miyagi is small for a basketball player, but makes up for it with incredible speed, skills and court awareness. His skills are typical of a point guard: strong passing, dribbling and stealing, as well as an understanding of the game that allows him to be a floor leader. He also shares a similar level of arrogance with Sakuragi, saying that he is the number one point guard in the prefecture, though popular opinion among characters in the series ranks him just behind Shinichi Maki of Kainan and Kenji Fujima of Shoyo. In the series he is often pitted against taller point guards but is able to beat them with his incredible speed. Miyagi becomes captain after Akagi and Kogure graduate school and leave the team.

==== Kaede Rukawa ====
Voiced by: Hikaru Midorikawa (anime), Shin'ichiro Kamio (The First Slam Dunk) (Japanese); Scott McCord (anime), Aleks Le (The First Slam Dunk) (English)

Kaede Rukawa (流川 楓, Rukawa Kaede) is the small forward of the Shohoku team, number 11, and Hanamichi Sakuragi's rival.^{[ch. 171]} Both Rukawa and Sakuragi are in grade ten at Shohoku High. Yet Rukawa is the polar opposite to Sakuragi — attractive to girls, skilled at basketball, and very cold and aloof, although he does share some traits with Sakuragi in that they are not academically inclined and are good fighters. Although he regards Sakuragi as an idiot and the two frequently get into conflicts, he seems to realize that Sakuragi can put his talents to better use. Takenori Akagi's younger sister, Haruko, has a crush on him,^{[ch. 2]} though she does not confess it and he himself is completely unaware of her feelings. Rukawa's chief hobby outside basketball is sleeping, and he is usually seen asleep whenever he's not on the court because he spends his nights practicing further. Due to this, he is prone to falling asleep even while riding his bicycle. He has also been in his fair share of off-court fights, but can hold his own. Rukawa's goal is to be the best high school player in Japan, and he considers Sendoh of Ryonan to be his greatest rival. He is often referred to as the "super-rookie" and the "ace of Shohoku".

Rukawa is extremely good at basketball, and possesses a wide range of skills to complement his height, athleticism and drive to win. Despite being merely a first-year high school player, he is the undisputed ace of Shohoku's team. In the Kanagawa Inter-high Tournament, he was named one of the top five players, the only first-year player so honored.^{[ch. 2]} He has changed the course of many games, such as when he single-handedly brought Shohoku back from a double-digit deficit against Kainan. However, his style is criticized as being too selfish and lone wolf, and he sometimes gets into conflict with his teammates for various reasons. This was one of the reasons why Coach Mitsuyoshi Anzai refused to give him his approval when Rukawa told him that he intended to go to the United States, and told him to become the top-ranking player in Japan before he even thought of it. When he was outplayed by Sawakita during the match against Sannoh though, he realized that he had to change his style of play and pass the ball. It was his pass that led to Sakuragi's buzzer-beating shot, winning the match. Rukawa is later named a member of the All-Japan basketball team.

==== Yasuharu Yasuda ====
Voiced by: Masaya Onosaka (anime), Yōhei Azakami (The First Slam Dunk)

Yasuharu Yasuda (安田 靖春, Yasuda Yasuharu) is one of the minor players from Shohoku. Although Hanamichi picks on him (Hanamichi calls him "Yasu"), he is no pushover, as demonstrated when he stood up to Mitsui and Tetsuo when they were attempting to get the Shohoku team banned from competition for fighting. He is Ryota's close friend, and thanks to his mild and calm character he can manage to calm things down when the tension on the court starts to heat up. One example of this is when Anzai sent Yasuda into the match against Miuradai and Toyotama in place of Sakuragi after all five starters were infuriated by Toyotama's provocative tactics.

==== Toki Kuwata ====
Voiced by: Toshiyuki Morikawa (anime), Taishi Murata (The First Slam Dunk)

One of Shohoku's reserve players, Toki Kuwata (桑田 登紀, Kuwata Tōki) is a first year student who played as a forward in junior high school. Being one of the smallest in the team, as seen in the first year tryouts, he was reassigned to the guard position by Akagi. He is one of the five first year students who passed the tryout, alongside Sakuragi, Rukawa, Sasaoka and Iishi.

It was revealed in the anime that he is inspired to become better at basketball because of Sakuragi and Rukawa's success as newcomers in the team. He might also be Sakuragi's classmate, as seen in the anime, because when Akagi asked about Sakuragi's whereabouts during practice, Kuwata answered that he hasn't seen him the whole day.

Although he hasn't played in a single game, Kuwata can be a reliable person for the team. When Sakuragi and Mitsui where stuck in a melee with Tetsuo's former gang, Kogure asked Kuwata to call Sakuragi's phone. During Mitsui's collapse against Ryonan, Kuwata took care of him and stayed until Mitsui told him to leave and watch the game for him.

In the OVA, as Shohoku heads to a friendly match against Ryokufu, Kuwata meets a former classmate and has the opportunity to learn more about Ryokufu's basketball team, thus giving Akagi some ideas.

In the manga 10 Days After, he along with his fellow first year students are seen jogging while discussing their chances of having more playing time in the future, as the third year players have retired from the team to prepare for their university entrance exams.

==== Satoru Kakuta ====
Voiced by: Shinobu Satouchi (anime), Daichi Endō (The First Slam Dunk)

Satoru Kakuta (角田 悟, Kakuta Satoru) is a second year student who plays as a center. Although he is already in his second year and also a tall player, he can't deny that he can't keep up with the starters, as seen in the manga where he is beaten by Sakuragi's quick and skillful plays. However, he proves that he can be a reliable player when he is needed. In the anime, during their match against Miuradai and Shoyo, with less than two minutes remaining, Kakuta dives for a crucial save to get a loose ball, which was key to Shohoku winning the game.

He might also be Miyagi's classmate, as seen in the anime where he tells Kogure that Miyagi hasn't been in class, but his classmates have seen him hanging around.

==== Tetsushi Shiozaki ====
Voiced by: Nobutoshi Canna (anime), Tooru Sakurai (The First Slam Dunk)

Playing in the shooting guard position, Tetsushi Shiozaki (潮崎 哲士, Shiozaki Tetsushi) was originally a starter before Miyagi and Mitsui's return.

In the anime and manga, it was Shiozaki who revealed Miyagi's reason for being hospitalized, and describing the details of Mitsui and Miyagi's feud in the latter part of the series.

==== Satoru Sasaoka ====
Voiced by: Shinobu Satouchi (anime; ep. 22), Yoshiyuki Kono (anime; eps. 30–36), Yūsuke Hoshino (The First Slam Dunk)

One of Shohoku's bench players, Satoru Sasaoka (佐々岡 智, Sasaoka Satoru) is a first year student who plays as a forward. He has not played in any real games yet. In the anime, Sasaoka often blurts out comical statements that make Sakuragi react and bully him or the other first year students.

During the practice game against Ryonan, when Ayako distributes the official jerseys, Sakuragi was angered by not having his own jersey. Thus, Kogure is forced to make adjustments to accommodate Sakuragi, leaving Sasaoka with no jersey to wear. Instead, he ends up with a taped number 16 in his shirt, while tearfully wondering why he became the sacrificial lamb. This event led to Sakuragi wearing the number 10 jersey for the remainder of the series. Despite so, in every basketball match Shohoku participates in, he was supportive of Sakuragi, as he did to other team members throughout the series.

Sasaoka is also seen jogging with Kuwata and Iishi in the manga 10 Days After.

==== Kentarou Ishii ====
Voiced by: Nobutoshi Hayashi (anime), Chado Horii (The First Slam Dunk)

Kentaro Ishii (石井 健太郎, Ishii Kentarō) is also a bench player, playing as a guard. He has not played in a single game. Like Sasaoka, Iishi also often becomes a subject of Sakuragi's bullying, which at one point annoyed Akagi. Despite so, he remains supportive of Sakuragi, as he did to other members of the team during the matches Shokoku participates in throughout the whole series.

He might also be Rukawa's classmate, as seen in the anime, where during class, their professor becomes annoyed at seeing Rukawa sleeping during class. A student with glasses and semi-bald hair tries to pacify the professor by telling him that Rukawa is too tired from the game yesterday.

He also appears in the Manga 10 Days After, jogging his way to the gym along with Kuwata and Sasaoka.

==== Mitsuyoshi Anzai ====
Voiced by: Tomomichi Nishimura (anime), Katsuhisa Hōki (The First Slam Dunk) (Japanese); Mike Pollock (The First Slam Dunk) (English)

Mitsuyoshi Anzai (安西 光義, Anzai Mitsuyoshi) is the overweight and beloved coach of the Shohoku basketball team, and one of the best coaches in Japan, with even the coaches of other teams calling him "Anzai-sensei" with respect. His calm and collected attitude contrasts with the temper he had in the past, when he was nicknamed "White-Haired Devil" (ホワイトヘアードデビル, Howaito Heādo Debiru) as an extremely strict and demanding college coach.

In the past, a talented player named Ryuji Yazawa trained under him and was highly regarded. However, Yazawa became dissatisfied with Anzai's tough training for him alone and against Anzai's wishes, left Japan to play in the United States, where he thought he would have better opportunities to show his talent. Five years passed and Anzai learned from the press that Yazawa died in a high-speed head-on car collision, reportedly under the influence of drugs. Yazawa's mother gave Anzai a letter written four years prior, in which Yazawa expressed profound regret about his rebellious decision to leave, and was depressed as a result of the unsupportive American college basketball culture. Devastated over the loss of Yazawa, Anzai resigned from college basketball coaching and changed his strict attitude to his now mild temper, for which he is now known as the "White-Haired Buddha" (ホワイトヘアードブッダ, Howaito Heādo Budda).

Hanamichi Sakuragi always calls Anzai "Oyaji" (おやじ; lit. 'Old man') and has the habit of jiggling his fat when hyped, which makes the other players, Mitsui in particular, upset with him, as this is considered disrespectful. However, Anzai puts up with Sakuragi's antics. Anzai is a brilliant strategist who always knows how to turn the tide of a match for his team. As with Haruko Akagi, he recognizes Sakuragi's potential early on and decides to make him a starter even though some of his basketball skills are not yet up to par. Recognizing that shooting is Sakuragi's weakness, he makes him make 20,000 practice shots in a week to prepare for the national championship. Anzai is also very charismatic and able to inspire his players to greater heights. Out of all the players, Mitsui respects Anzai the most. Before the Inter-high match against Ryonan, he put a picture of Anzai on the bench and prayed to it when Anzai was unable to come due to a heart attack to the dismay of Takenori Akagi and Sakuragi. The most famous quote from the series is Anzai's trademark saying "If you give up, the game is already over." (あきらめたらそこで試合終了, Akirametara soko de shiai shūryō).

==== Ayako ====
Voiced by: Eriko Hara (anime), Asami Seto (The First Slam Dunk) (Japanese); Caitriona Murphy (anime), Kelsey Jaffer (The First Slam Dunk) (English)

Ayako (彩子, Ayako) is the manager of the team and object of Ryota Miyagi's affections. Both Ayako and Ryota are in grade eleven. Strong-willed, somewhat tomboyish and good-natured, at first Ayako does not seem to reciprocate Ryota's feelings for her, which she knows of, and will not until the end of the series. She is directly responsible for sharpening Hanamichi Sakuragi's abilities for real matches by training him in the basics, such as ball possession and dribbling. Miyagi refers to her as "Aya-chan" (アヤちゃん) because of his attraction to her, and she responds by calling him "Ryota" rather than by his surname. During the national championships, the relationship between Ayako and Ryota develops to the point where he can confide in her about his uncertainties about the upcoming Sannoh match when he was alone with her, and during the match Ayako motivates him by writing the words "Number 1 Guard" on his hand to keep him focused and determined.

=== Kainan University Affiliated High School ===
Kainan University Affiliated High School (海南大附属高校, Kainan daifuzoku Kōkō) has won the Kanagawa Interhigh Tournament for 17 years running and are known as the "Champions of Kanagawa" (神奈川の王者, Kanagawa no Ōsha). Their entire team is composed of elite players and demonstrates incredible stamina and defensive ability. The team has no notable weaknesses. Kainan lost in the semifinals in the previous national championship to defending champion Sannoh by 30 points. Kazuma Takasago and Tadashi Mutou round out their starters. At the end of the manga, they are ranked number 2 in Japan.

==== Shinichi Maki ====
Voiced by: Hisao Egawa

Shinichi Maki (牧 紳一, Maki Shin'ichi) is the point guard of the Kainan team and is reputed to be the best player in Kanagawa, and was crowned prefectural MVP twice. As team captain, he exerts great leadership over his teammates, who follow his orders to the letter. Though his personality belies it, he can be as strict as Akagi, but mostly only towards Kiyota. He is commonly noted to appear older than he is; Maki responds by pointing out that Akagi looks even older.

Maki plays mostly as a point guard, although he has the all-round skills to play in virtually any other position. Extremely muscular and strong, he likes to use his physical attributes to drive into the lane to score while drawing fouls. Sakuragi manages in one occasion to surpass Maki in physical strength while scoring a dunk, despite Maki fouling him. His scoring ability is incredibly difficult to stop and in one game, four players from Shohoku (Akagi, Rukawa, Mitsui and Miyagi) are needed to completely shut him down. Maki uses his height and power to create mismatches against other point guards, which his team usually capitalizes on effectively. It is said that the only difference between Maki and Fujima is the power Maki has that no other point guards have.

Off the court, Maki can be found almost every game, often serving as a commentator. He comments on players on the court, explaining actions of players, and the flow of the game. Often mentioned with Fujima, they are considered as rivals although the relationship does not seem to be totally antagonistic.

==== Nobunaga Kiyota ====
Voiced by: Toshiyuki Morikawa

Nobunaga Kiyota (清田 信長, Kiyota Nobunaga) is the small forward of the Kainan team who closely resembles Sakuragi in attitude but has the skills to back up his boasting. He tends to underestimate other teams, especially Shohoku, which can lead to embarrassing situations, such as when Akagi flattened him with a dunk. Kiyota likes to call Hanamichi "Red Monkey" (赤毛猿, Akasaru) while Hanamichi calls him "Wild Monkey." Despite being so arrogant, Kiyota has a high level of respect for his teammates, especially towards his captain Maki. Kiyota is known for his leaping ability and ball-handing skills. Despite being only 178 cm, he can dunk and block shots quite regularly. Against Shohoku, he is able to block the last shot of Mitsui, which would have sealed the game for Shohoku. He is the only starter for Kainan who is a first year.

==== Soichiro Jin ====
Soichiro Jin (神 宗一郎, Jin Sōichirō) is the shooting guard of Kainan and one of the best sharpshooters in Kanagawa, matched only by Mitsui. He originally used to be a center, but his slender build, slow movement and weak leaping ability never allowed him to perform well in this position. Instead of being discouraged, he became a shooting guard, where he could put his talents to better use. Jin became well-versed in three-pointers as a result of shooting 500 a day after practice. Jin has a very mild personality and always looks calm and agreeable. It is revealed in the national championships that Jin finishes as the leading scorer in the Kanagawa Interhigh Tournament, averaging 30.6 points per game (followed closely by Rukawa's 30 points per game).

==== Yoshinori Miyamasu ====
Voiced by: Shinobu Satouchi

Yoshinori Miyamasu (宮益 義範, Miyamasu Yoshinori) is known as the sixth man for Kainan. His unimposing presence distracts opponents from his basketball skills, especially his reliable three point shooting, the accuracy of which is comparable to Jin's and Mitsui's. Though he wears glasses, when called to play, he replaces them with a pair of goggles. Yoshinori plays his first game when he is called in by Coach Riki Takato in order to shut down Sakuragi. Takato correctly deduces that Sakuragi will not take Yoshinori seriously enough to properly mark him, enabling Yoshinori to be effective.

==== Riki Takato ====
Voiced by: Masaharu Sato

Riki Takato (高頭 力, Takato Riki) is Kainan's coach and a contemporary of Ryonan's Moichi Taoka, who is a year older than he is. They have known each other since high school, when they themselves played for their respective schools, forging a fierce rivalry since that time. He has been responsible for the team's domination of the Kanagawa Interhigh Tournament for the past 17 years. Kainan's training regimen is so tough that it weeds out half the incoming players within the first week, and another half within the first month. After a year, barely a fifth of the new players remain. The previous year, Takato also coached the team to the semifinal of the national championships, which they lost to Sannoh.

He is able to read Sakuragi's character well enough during the Interhigh Tournament to substitute in Yoshinori for Jin, which causes Sakuragi to lose focus and allows Yoshinori to compound this by being effective at shooting. Normally cool and collected when his team is dominating, Takato becomes very agitated and anxious when they get pressed, when he starts to yell at his players.

=== Ryonan High School ===
The Ryonan High School (陵南高校, Ryōnan Kōkō) basketball team is considered one of the top teams in Kanagawa Prefecture along with Shoyo and Kainan. The team was seeded first in their respective division during the Interhigh Tournament. The remaining starters for Ryonan are the guards Tomoyuki Uekusa and Hiraoki Koshino. However, their main weaknesses are the lack of a star point guard and a three-point shooter.

==== Jun Uozumi ====
Voiced by: Yukimasa Kishino

Jun Uozumi (魚住 純, Uozumi Jun) is Ryonan's captain and center. He considers Takenori Akagi his rival, but has never managed to personally beat him. However their rivalry is not antagonistic, as there is a mutual respect that borders on friendship. When Akagi is outplayed and discouraged in the match against Sannoh, Uozumi is able to restore Akagi's spirits. After the loss to Shohoku in the Kanagawa prefectural trials eliminated Ryonan from national competition, Uozumi leaves the team to train as a chef, aspiring to be a sushi chef like his father. Sendoh succeeds him as team captain. Sakuragi refers to him as "Boss Monkey" because he is as well-built as Akagi and taller. Due to Uozumi's physical build, Sannoh basketball team player Masashi Kawata mistakes Uozumi as Akagi's father when he sees him encouraging Akagi to continue playing during the match between Shohoku and Sannoh.

Uozumi's size and power are unmatched in high school basketball, with the exception of Sakuragi, who was able to out-rebound, block, and occasionally fouling him out of the game, noting that he was stronger than Uozumi himself. However, he started as a very weak player, and was ridiculed and bullied by his upperclassmen for only having height but very little of everything else. Ryonan's coach Taoka Moichi encouraged him to continue playing though, and eventually Uozumi developed into becoming a fearsome center. He is considered as one of the top centers in Kanagawa. However, his temper and lack of control in critical game situations has led to serious consequences for his team on more than one occasion.

==== Akira Sendoh ====
Voiced by: Hōchū Ōtsuka

Akira Sendoh (仙道 彰, Sendō Akira) is Ryonan's ace and small forward who is considered one of the top players in Kanagawa. An easygoing person, Sendoh usually has a smile on his face whether on-court or off. He can be lazy at times and has a reputation for arriving late to practice sessions and matches. His tardiness is tolerated though, because of his abilities. His teammates trust him wholeheartedly, firmly believing that he can lead Ryonan to victory even if they are trailing. However, he was outplayed by Eiji Sawakita back in junior high.

Sendoh's all-round skills are repeatedly displayed throughout the series. He is capable of playing a one-on-one style of play like Rukawa, but also understands how to utilize his teammates effectively. Against Kainan, Sendoh is deployed as a point guard to match-up Maki, but transforms himself into a deadly scorer when the game is on the line. Sendoh succeeds Uozomi as captain after he and Ikegami left the team. While he is easygoing and humble, he is able to recognize the talent of other players, and is really passionate about the game.

In some way, Sendoh also contributed Rukawa's growth as a basketball player: Coach Anzai pointed out to Rukawa, that he is below Sendoh, causing Rukawa to think about his playing style. During a one on one match with Rukawa before the Nationals, Sendoh made Rukawa realize that one on one is not the only way of playing a game. Reminded by this conversation Rukawa had with Sendoh, Rukawa is able to change his playing style to include more passing, which helps Shohoku beat Sannoh.

==== Kicchou Fukuda ====
Voiced by: Hideo Ishikawa

Kicchou Fukuda (福田 吉兆, Fukuda Kitchō) is a power forward of the Ryonan team and one of their aces. His offensive power rivals many of the best players in Kanagawa. Fukuda is seen throughout the series doing alley-oops with Sendoh as the passer, but his defensive ability is weak and can be easily exploited. He has something of a rivalry going on with Sakuragi from the first time they learn of each other, when the latter was depressed over the loss to Kainan and was near a basketball court where Fukuda was practicing. Fukuda had previously heard about Sakuragi from Sendoh and had wanted to play him, but Sakuragi refused.

Ryonan coach Moichi Taoka saw potential in both Fukuda and Sendoh starting from when they joined the team together. However, as Fukuda still seemed green and thick-skinned, Taoka would frequently criticize him while praising Sendoh. Fukuda however, turned out to be quite sensitive. As a result, in an exhibition match at Ryonan, Fukuda released his pent-up aggression on Taoka and attacked him. This incident resulted in Fukuda's suspension from all games up until the Interhigh Tournament, thus explaining his absence in the practice match against Shohoku until Ryonan plays Kainan. Possibly because of all the rudeness he used to be treated with, Fukuda loves to be respected and praised. He even bursts into tears when the crowd cheers him on against Kainan.

==== Ryoji Ikegami ====
Voiced by: Hikaru Midorikawa

Ryoji Ikegami (池上 良治, Ikegami Ryōji) is the vice-captain and is known as the best defender on the team. In the last half of the Shohoku-Ryonan match he is asked to mark Mitsui and he manages to temporarily shut him down, having previously outclassed Sakuragi (who was obsessed with beating Fukuda) in the same match, but he was later shut down completely by Sakuragi himself. He leaves the team with Uozomi after the loss to Shohoku in the Interhigh Tournament knocks Ryonan out of the national championship run. Unlike Uozomi however, who starts to get emotional in encouraging his teammates to bring Ryonan further the next season, Ikegami is cool and collected.

==== Hiroaki Koshino ====
Voiced by: Shinobu Satouchi

Hiroaki Koshino (越野 宏明, Koshino Hiroaki) is a shooting guard and one of Ryonan's main playmakers. Although not up to the level of Mitsui or Jin, he is still a good long range shooter. He also has a rather dry wit, and a quick temper, being readily offended by rude behavior from Sakuragi and Kiyota.

==== Hikoichi Aida ====
Voiced by: Masaya Onosaka

Hikoichi Aida (相田 彦一, Aida Hikoichi) aspires to become a player like his Ryonan teammates but, not being up to their level, he stays with the reserves and acts more as a team manager than a full player, taking detailed notes during matches. His catchphrase is "gotta check it," aside from shouting "Unbelievable!!!" every time something exciting happens during a match. Hikoichi too considers Sakuragi a great player, because Sakuragi convinced him of this when they first met. Hikoichi also idolizes Miyagi because he is a starter for Shohoku despite his short height (Miyagi is only three centimeters taller than Hikoichi). Hikoichi's older sister Yayoi is a reporter for a weekly basketball magazine.

==== Moichi Taoka ====
Voiced by: Unshō Ishizuka

Moichi Taoka (田岡 茂一, Taoka Moichi) is Ryonan's coach and a contemporary of Kainan's Riki Takato, who is a year younger than he is. Both of them have known each other since high school. Both men are still friends, but are also rivals. If he had his way, Taoka's dream team would have consisted of Sendoh, Uozomi, Mitsui, Miyagi, and Rukawa, with the latter three playing the same positions they now play for Shohoku. He personally recruited them, but each turned him down for various reasons: Both Mitsui and Miyagi turned him down due to respect for Coach Anzai, Rukawa simply chose Shohoku over Ryonan because Shohoku was closer than Ryonan in distance. Still, Taoka is happy with his current team and believes that out of all the teams he has coached, it has trained the hardest.

Taoka is a good coach, but has makes mistakes in judging his players and the opposition. He still has an eye for talent, as he recognizes Uozomi's potential and gives him encouragement when Uozomi's skills were weak and he was thinking of quitting. Taoka also realized that when Sendoh and Fukuda joined the team that they would become key players. However, he thought that he could encourage Fukuda by criticizing him while at the same time praising Sendoh. Fukuda's personality turned out to be more sensitive, and after a year of criticism, he snapped, attacking Taoka during a practice match. Having learned from his mistake, Taoka uses Fukuda to great effect during the match with Kainan.

He also makes some key mistakes in the game against Shohoku because he underestimates both Sakuragi and Kogure. He did not think much of Sakuragi, who brings Shohoku back in the game with unpredictable movements. As for Kogure, he told his players to double team Rukawa and Akagi believing that leaving Kogure wide open would not do harm. However, Kogure makes a three pointer which pretty much sealed the victory for Shohoku.

=== Sannoh Industry Affiliated High School ===
The Sannoh Industry Affiliated High School (山王工業高校, San'nō Kōgyō Kōkō) basketball team has been the defending national champion for three years running and is ranked as an AA team. They are considered the top high school team in Japan and have been a dominant force in high school basketball for years. The team has mastered the full court press defense and can trap even the fastest point guards and immobilize their opponents' offense.

==== Kazunari Fukatsu ====
Voiced by: Tōru Nara

Kazunari Fukatsu (深津一成, Fukatsu Kazunari) is the point guard and team captain. He is able to read and control the flow of the game quite well and always plays with a calm and cool demeanor, looking to exploit any flaws in the opposing team. Fukatsu possesses great passing skills, an accurate three point shot, and excellent defensive skills. He forms the core trio of the Sannoh team, along with Masashi Kawata and Sawakita. He has an odd habit of adding "yo" to almost everything he says. Masashi told reporter Yayoi Aida he used to always say "man" before switching to "yo".

==== Masashi Kawata ====
Voiced by: Mitsuaki Kanuka

Masashi Kawata (河田雅史, Kawata Masashi) is considered the top high school center in Japan. Unlike a traditional center, he possesses speed and long-range shooting ability to complement his height, power, and rebounding. Masashi was initially quite short as a first-year student (165 cm), but rapidly grew over the next year (25 cm). As his height increased he played different positions. This provided him with the opportunity to develop skills other centers lack. When Shohoku meets Sannoh in the national championship, Akagi is completely outplayed by Masashi and concedes that Masashi is the better player, however, he somehow find a match satisfacted by Shohoku's power forward, Sakuragi. His younger and larger brother Mikio is also on the team.

==== Eiji Sawakita ====
Voiced by: Shunsuke Takeuchi

Eiji Sawakita (沢北栄治, Sawakita Eiji) is the small forward and also the ace of Sannoh and best all-round player in Japanese high school basketball. His offensive ability is nearly unstoppable and is equally matched by his defensive ability. Sawakita was taught basketball by his father, who played him one-on-one since he was four years old. Sawakita thus developed extraordinary skills and stamina, such that no high school player can offer a true match-up with him. Sawakita beat Sendoh when they played each other in junior high. Rukawa attempts to play him one-on-one in the second round of the national championships, but Sawakita proves that he is the better player and shuts down Rukawa's scoring, forcing him to change tactics. However, his play style is as selfish as Rukawa's had been, and eventually Sannoh lose. His signature shot is a tear drop shot, which has a release so high it is impossible to block, even for Sakuragi. Sawakita plans to go to America following the national championships. In the manga 10 Days After, Sawakita is shown to be on a plane bound for America, praticising basic English language and becoming drunk from drinking grape wine, which he accidentally orders from a stewardess.

==== Masahiro Nobe ====
Voiced by: Satoshi Tsuruoka

Masahiro Nobe (野辺将広, Nobe Masahiro) does not stand out for scoring abilities, but is a great rebounder. Because his team already has several scoring players, he is allowed to focus on rebounding. When Kakuta is matched up against him, he succeeds in blocking Kakuta out of his position and exhausting him, although Kakuta is only on the court for a few minutes. Sakuragi is probably the first opponent who beat him on rebounding by psyching him out and with his timing and jumping ability, scoring an alley-oop dunk over him. Nobe's teammate Masashi Kawata is the only other player who can beat him.

==== Satoshi Ichinokura ====
Voiced by: Yasushi Iwaki

Satoshi Ichinokura (一ノ倉聡, Ichinokura Satoshi) is a defensive specialist who has the most stamina and endurance on the team, and is quite proud of it. He is known for his sticky defense and starts the game against Shohoku with the sole purpose of wearing down Mitsui. Ichinokura's accomplishments include never skipping any of the team's training camps, winning the school marathon over members of the track team, and finishing a test despite having a ruptured appendix.

==== Mikio Kawata ====
Voiced by: Mitsuaki Kanuka

Mikio Kawata (河田美紀男, Kawata Mikio) is the younger brother of Masashi Kawata and the largest player in high school basketball. He uses his size to his advantage by posting up under the basket for an easy shot, even pushing back his marker to do so. Sannoh hopes to have him become an eventual starter. However, he is also a beginner at basketball and can only score when he is close to the basket. As such, he lacks experience, and having such a talented player as Masashi for an older brother to look up to puts additional pressure on him. Sakuragi takes advantage of this to try to get him off the game. Mikio has a habit of apologizing to his brother whenever he does something wrong.

==== Goro Domoto ====
Voiced by: Shunichi Maki

Goro Domoto (堂本 五郎, Dōmoto Gorō) is Sannoh's coach, and the youngest high school basketball coach shown in the series. It is not revealed how long he has been Sannoh's coach, but under his leadership, Sannoh has continued to maintain its dominance of high school basketball. Like Riki Takato of Kainan, Domoto also has a tough training regimen, which has motivated his key players such as Sawakita and Masashi Kawata to have previously skipped sessions.

Despite Sannoh's legendary reputation, Domoto does not rest on his laurels and yearly reiterates to his players that no team is guaranteed to win a match. This carries over to the preparations he makes for the match against Shohoku even though they are ranked low as a C in comparison to Sannoh's AA ranking. He has his players watch some game footage of Shohoku and has his current team play some of his former players who are now basketball stars in college and comprise the current all star team, while wearing jersey numbers corresponding to their Shohoku counterparts to simulate the upcoming match. Domoto remains cool and collected during the Shohoku-Sannoh match, and only makes two mistakes that end up costing Sannoh the match. The first of these is matching up Mikio Kawata with Sakuragi, who emerges from this match up with more confidence and determination in himself. The second is underestimating Sakuragi's drive to win the game in its final seconds and discounting him as a result of his injury. Domoto thus does not call a timeout that he intended to take.

=== Shoyo High School ===
Shoyo High School (翔陽高校, Shōyō Kōkō) is considered the main rival of Kainan. The team was seeded first in their respective division during the Interhigh Tournament, and is the only team so seeded not to make it into the final four because of their loss to Shohoku. The height of Shoyo's players is among the tallest in Kanagawa. However, their one weakness is the lack of a dedicated coach with Kenji Fujima playing the roles of both coach and point guard.

==== Kenji Fujima ====
Voiced by: Koji Tsujitani

Kenji Fujima (藤真健司, Fujima Kenji) is the point guard and coach of Shoyo. As such, he only enters the court when his presence is really needed, such as when the team is behind and struggling. Fujima is so respected by his teammates that as much as possible they try not to make it necessary for him to get on the court, and even the hint of his getting off the bench to join them inspires them to play harder. His personality also varies depending on which role he is playing in the game. As a coach and off the court, he is calm, mild-mannered and friendly, but he becomes confident, high-spirited and even ruthless when on the court.

Fujima plays as a typical point guard, leading his team and passing the ball, but also shooting and scoring when necessary. He is one of the top point guards in Kanagawa and a force to be reckoned with. According to several characters, Fujima is seen as the second best point guard in the Kanagawa prefecture, only edged out by Maki. Fujima is referenced during the first round of the national championships when Shohoku plays against Toyotama High School. Toyotama's captain, Tsuyoshi Minami, known as the "Ace Killer," injured Fujima in a match resulting in his removal from the game due to his injury. Subsequently, Shoyo lost the match to Toyotama. Before the Winter trials, he lost some weight to make himself more agile.

==== Toru Hanagata ====
Voiced by: Nobuhiko Kazama

Toru Hanagata (花形透, Hanagata Tōru) is considered one of the top centers in the Kanagawa along with Akagi and Uozumi. He mixes strength and tactical skill in his playing, being able to easily avoid defensive play. When Fujima is not on court, he takes the role of captain, being responsible for psyching up the team. For this, he is quite a trustworthy player for Shoyo. Hanagata is known for his fade away shot, which is difficult to block. He is the only starter shown to wear glasses, though they are knocked off his face when Sakuragi commits his fourth foul, and Hanagata plays the rest of the match without them.

Hanagata holds his own in the Shohoku match against Akagi, but is totally outclassed by Sakuragi in rebounding. Being a top center, he is quite agile for his height. He also knows how to use his teammates effectively. Hanagata and Nagano are knocked down by Sakuragi after the latter dunked on them, but despite the effort Sakuragi still got his fifth foul.

==== Kazushi Hasegawa ====
Voiced by: Kōzō Shioya

Kazushi Hasegawa (長谷川一志, Hasegawa Kazushi) is the forward and has a personal history with Hisashi Mitsui. In junior high school, he faced Mitsui's confidence as well as his own inability to beat him in a match. Later on in high school, he encountered Mitsui again after the latter had become a delinquent and was shocked to see how much he had changed. They meet again in the last match of the Kanagawa Interhigh Tournament, where he offers to mark Mitsui personally in a box-and-one. There, Hasegawa brings his memories back and marks Mitsui relentlessly, but to no avail, as Mitsui has already managed to turn the tide of the match for Shohoku. Before the match, Hasegawa stated that he would hold Mitsui to no more than 5 points. Having accidentally overheard this, the reawakened Mitsui went on to score 20 points, including five consecutive 3 pointers in the second half, to erase Shoyo's 12 point lead over Shohoku.

=== Toyotama High School ===
Toyotama High School (豊玉高校, Toyotama Kōkō) is the runner-up team from Osaka in the national championships, having lost to Daiei. They are an A ranked team and almost all of their starters are third years. Shohoku faces them in the first round of the national championship, where Toyotama show a talent for getting away with violent, flagrant fouls. In addition, their supporters constantly yell, swear at, and threaten the opposite team. They have mastered the run and gun style of play and divide their effort between 80% offense and 20% defense. Toyotama's main weakness is the replacement of their previous coach, Kitano (北野), who nurtured the team's offensive philosophy and is widely respected by the players. His replacement, on the other hand, Kanehira (金平), emphasizes defensive basketball, which the players had difficulty adjusting to. Because of this, they prefer to play their own way rather than listen to their new coach, who they threatened with violence. During the match against Shohoku, Kanehira hits Kishimoto after finally getting fed up.

Toyotama's ace is Minori Kishimoto (岸本 実理, Kishimoto Minori), who earns not only Hikoichi's enmity for Toyotama after he dismisses Sendoh's abilities as a player, but also from Sakuragi, who spends the first half under intense pressure and can not perform well enough, being substituted for by Yasuda early in the match. Their other ace and captain is Tsuyoshi Minami (南 烈, Minami Tsuyoshi), who is the most aggressive of the players. He is known as the "Ace Killer" (エースキラー, Ēsu Kirā) and lives up to this nickname by hitting Rukawa in the face with his elbow as he once did to Kenji Fujima from Shoyo, leaving him with a black eye for the whole second half of the game (the incident with Fujima consequently led to Shoyo's defeat). Minami however makes up for it later, as the night before the match against Sannoh, he gives Rukawa an ointment to help his eye heal and warns him about Sawakita. The other players include Mitsuaki Iwata (岩田 三秋, Iwata Mitsuaki) (center), Kyohei Yajima (矢嶋 京平, Yajima Kyōhei) (shooting guard) and Daijiro Itakura (板倉 大二朗, Itakura Daijirō) (point guard). One of the reserve players, Teruo Okawa (大川 輝男, Ōkawa Teruo), is a friend of Hikoichi Aida from junior high.

== Other characters ==
=== Haruko Akagi ===
Voiced by: Akiko Hiramatsu (anime), Maaya Sakamoto (The First Slam Dunk) (Japanese); Martha MacIsaac (anime), Abby Espiritu (The First Slam Dunk) (English)

Haruko Akagi (赤木 晴子, Akagi Haruko) is Takenori's younger sister and Hanamichi Sakuragi's love interest. Sweet and with a captivating personality, she is always around to cheer on the players, especially her brother Takenori, who is extremely protective of her and taught her the basics of basketball, Kaede Rukawa and Sakuragi, whom she considers her best friend. Haruko often appears at matches together with Sakuragi's cohorts and her two best friends, Fujii and Matsui. She, like most girls in Shohoku, only has eyes for Rukawa, although he is unaware of her feelings towards him.

Haruko was responsible for uncovering Sakuragi's athletic talent after seeing him try to dunk a ball at her request - she was impressed by the height of his jump and considered him good enough to join the team. Sakuragi always listens to her due to his deep affection for her. They have gone on some (what Sakuragi considers) non-official dates and have occasionally trained together. Haruko shared a deep relationship with Sakuragi throughout the series (though it was more of a friendship rather than romance) and served as one of his main pillars of support throughout every basketball match Sakuragi participates in.

Despite her emotional denseness and sweetness, Haruko is a pretty good student, helping Akagi tutor Sakuragi and Rukawa as well as the other two starters when they had to retake some tests they had failed or be disqualified from the National Tournament, and is not afraid to stand up for others when needed. She confronted Sakuragi when she mistakenly thought that he had attacked Rukawa, and she also defended him many times from his most rabid fangirls (one of them even knocked her to the ground in the anime series). At the end of the manga series, Haruko becomes the second manager of basketball team. It is unclear to whether or not she returns the feelings to Sakuragi.

=== Sakuragi's Gang ===
Sakuragi's gang, also known as The Sakuragi Legion (桜木軍団, Sakuragi Gundan), act like a Greek chorus. It has five members consisting of Hanamichi Sakuragi, Yohei Mito, Chuichirou Noma, Yuji Ohkusu, and Nozomi Takamiya. Despite their loyalty and willingness at offering a hand whenever convenient, they often tease Sakuragi, for which they receive headbutts. They also take advantage of him by frequently placing bets on whether his endeavors will succeed, and even charge admission to see Sakuragi's new hairstyle. In spite of all this, along with Yohei they are among Sakuragi's most loyal supporters, going to his games to cheer him on, and helping him out when he had to make 20,000 shots in one week to prepare for the national championships.

==== Yohei Mito ====
Voiced by: Toshiyuki Morikawa (anime), Chikahiro Kobayashi (The First Slam Dunk) (Japanese); Travis Ferris (anime), Yong Yea (The First Slam Dunk) (English)

Yohei Mito (水戸 洋平, Mito Yōhei) is one of the members of Sakuragi's Gang. He is Hanamichi's deputy commander. He is also Hanamichi Sakuragi's best friend from childhood, as well as a skilled fighter. Yohei is the sole member of the gang who is able to help with actual advice, and is also the best fighter out of the four (aside from Sakuragi himself), having beaten up Mitsui all on his own during the gym fight. During the game against Ryonan, Yohei seems to be the only one to realize how Sakuragi felt humiliated after a lopsided loss to Fukuda.

==== Chuichirou Noma ====
Voiced by: Yuji Mikimoto (anime), Kenichirou Matsuda (The First Slam Dunk) (Japanese); Brad Austin (anime) (English)

Chuichirou Noma (野間 忠一郎, Noma Chūichirō) is one of the members of Sakuragi's Gang. He is also known for having a sports mustache. He also attended Wakoh Junior High with Sakuragi.

==== Yuji Ohkusu ====
Voiced by: Nobutoshi Canna (anime), Masaya Fukunishi (The First Slam Dunk) (Japanese); Tim Hamaguchi (anime) (English)

Yuji Ohkusu (大楠 雄二, Ōkusu Yūji) is one of the members of Sakuragi's Gang. He is also known for having a blond and bushy hair. He also attended Wakoh Junior High with Sakuragi.

==== Nozomi Takamiya ====
Voiced by: Kōzō Shioya (anime), Masafumi Kobatake (The First Slam Dunk) (Japanese); Bill Houston (anime) (English)

Nozomi Takamiya (高宮 望, Takamiya Nozomi) is one of the members of Sakuragi's Gang. He is a short, out-of-shape, and bespectacled guy. He also attended Wakoh Junior High with Sakuragi.

=== Tatsuhiko Aota ===
Voiced by: Hideyuki Umezu, Kumiko Watanabe (young)

The captain of the Shohoku judo team, Tatsuhiko Aota (青田 龍彦, Aota Tatsuhiko) is a childhood friend of the Akagi siblings, having argued with Takenori over which sport was better, judo or basketball, since their youth. This resentment continued until their present age, where their feud is over which team will be National Champion first. He tries to get Hanamichi Sakuragi join the judo team because he considers his fighting skills exceptional, and to achieve this, "bribed" him with some photos of Haruko when she was younger. Still, Sakuragi refused, saying simply, "because I'm a basketball player" (actually because he knew he would actually be closer to Haruko if he stayed with the basketball team). But Tatsuhiko does not give up on trying once in a while. He is rather loyal to Takenori when the need arises, cheering him on when he is outplayed and hard-pressed during the second Ryonan match.

Despite being unable to physically coerce Sakuragi into joining the judo team, Tatsuhiko has proven that he is skilled, as he is the sole member of the judo team to qualify for the national championships in judo. It is also worth noting that Tatsuhiko has had a crush on Haruko since they were young. She calls him "Ta-chan" instead of by his last name, which irritates Sakuragi immensely.

=== Norio Hotta ===
Voiced by: Hōchū Ōtsuka (anime), Tetsu Inada (The First Slam Dunk)

Norio Hotta (堀田 徳男, Hotta Norio) is the leader of a gang of fellow Third Year students who are the reigning delinquents at Shohoku. Hanamichi Sakuragi catches his attention on the first day of school when he gets into an altercation with two of his cronies, resulting in his issuing a direct challenge to Sakuragi by interrupting one of his classes.^{[ch. 1]} Before Sakuragi and his gang arrive, Hotta and his cronies run into Kaede Rukawa on the school roof, who singlehandedly knocks out all four of them.^{[ch. 2]}

Hotta is a good friend of Hisashi Mitsui, and backed him up when he challenged Ryota Miyagi to a fight a year ago. He and his friends provide the muscle again after Miyagi returns, and they join Mitsui in his attack on the basketball team. From Kiminobu Kogure's revelation of Mitsui's prior history with basketball, Hotta realizes that Mitsui deep down wants to play again, and is persuaded by Sakuragi's gang to assume responsibility with them for fighting the team. Though Hotta and his friends failed to win in fights against Sakuragi's gang or even Rukawa, they are portrayed as among the best fighters in Shohoku. Hotta and his cronies later become supporters of the basketball team during the National Championship Tournament (though even they get scared by the aggressiveness of the Toyotama crowd), largely because of their friendship with Mitsui, who they give the epithet Honoo no Otoko (炎の男; lit. 'Flaming Man').

=== Tetsuo ===
Voiced by: Masaharu Sato

Tetsuo (鉄男) is a biker and the only adult member of Hisashi Mitsui's gang, which included Norio Hotta and his cronies, in addition to some other delinquent high school students. It would appear that he is the gang leader, although he largely defers to Mitsui when they launch their attack on the Shohoku basketball team. He appears to be in his late 20s/30s, and is the gang's most experienced and capable fighter. Tetsuo succeeds in knocking out five Shohoku players, among them Kaede Rukawa and Ryota Miyagi, but is brutally beaten up by Hanamichi Sakuragi.

After Mitsui leaves the gang and rejoins the team, Tetsuo later runs into him after the former is heading home after getting his knee checked. He accepts Mitsui as an athlete, reaffirming the latter's decision to rejoin the team. Tetsuo makes an additional appearance in the anime when on the morning of Shohoku's match with Shoyo, he is chased and cornered by the non-Shohoku members of his gang, who beat him up in a bid to challenge his leadership. Mitsui comes upon them, but refuses to fight because of the vow he made to Coach Anzai not to fight again. Tetsuo stands up for him, but gets knocked out. However the timely intervention of Sakuragi and his gang enables the two basketball players to leave the scene, resulting in Tetsuo teaming up with Sakuragi's gang to take out Ryu and his cronies.

=== Yayoi Aida ===
Voiced by: Yūko Nagashima

Yayoi Aida (相田 弥生, Aida Yayoi) is Hikoichi's older sister, who works as a reporter for a weekly basketball magazine. Even though her brother plays for Ryonan, she is mostly designated to cover Shohoku matches, in which she is always impressed about Shohoku players' performances, as they mostly play stronger opponents like Kainan or Sannoh. She is almost always accompanied by a bubbly trainee called Nakamura (中村), who does the driving when they need to go from gym to gym even though he drives slowly, as he had just gotten his driving license. She also has a crush on Ryonan ace Sendoh.

=== Ryu ===
Voiced by: Nobuhiko Kazama

Ryu (竜, Ryū) is one of the non-Shohoku members of Hisashi Mitsui's gang and the only other non-Shohoku member besides Tetsuo given the most depth. During Mitsui's attack on the basketball team, he is matched up with Kaede Rukawa, giving him a bloody head wound with a broken mop head, but in turn gets knocked out by Rukawa. In the anime, Ryu challenges Tetsuo's leadership by recruiting new members and targeting him after Mitsui rejoins the basketball team. The arrival of Sakuragi's gang enables Mitsui and Sakuragi to break away and head to the 3rd round match (which they are late for), and results in the trouncing of Ryu and his gang members.

=== Dr. T ===
Voiced by: Yoku Shioya (Japanese); Neil Crone (English)

Dr. T is a self-insert of author Takehiko Inoue that is drawn in a deformed-style. He breaks the fourth wall in order to explain tips, techniques and trivia about basketball to the readers. In the anime, he appears "teaching" Sakuragi basketball moves the latter does not know. Dr. T also appears in the 1998 basketball video game 1 on 1, for which Inoue worked as character designer.
