= JoJo's Bizarre Adventure: Stone Ocean =

Fifth season of JoJo's Bizarre Adventure anime

- Season 5
- Key visual, depicting (left to right) Jolyne, Foo Fighters, Weather Report, Emporio, Anasui, Jotaro, and Ermes
- No. of episodes: 38

Release
- Original network: Netflix (streaming); Tokyo MX, BS11, MBS, Animax (TV broadcast)
- Original release: December 1, 2021 – December 1, 2022

Season chronology
- ← Previous; Season 4: Golden; Wind Next → Season 6: Steel; Ball Run

JoJo's Bizarre Adventure: Stone Ocean (Japanese: ジョジョの奇妙な冒険 ストーンオーシャン, Hepburn: JoJo no Kimyō na Bōken: Sutōn Ōshan) is the fifth season of the JoJo's Bizarre Adventure anime television series produced by David Production, adapting Stone Ocean, the sixth part of Hirohiko Araki's JoJo's Bizarre Adventure manga series. The first twelve episodes of Stone Ocean were initially released worldwide as part of an original net animation season on Netflix on December 1, 2021, before its scheduled airing on Japanese television in January 2022; the next twelve episodes released worldwide on September 1, 2022, and the final fourteen episodes were released on December 1 of the same year. Viz Media licensed the home video rights in North America.

== Plot ==
Set in 2011 in the United States, Jolyne Cujoh is sentenced to 15 years in prison after being involved in a car accident and framed for the vehicular manslaughter of a pedestrian. She is imprisoned at Green Dolphin Street Prison near Port St. Lucie, Florida, nicknamed the "Aquarium". Her father, Jotaro Kujo, visits her in prison, and she is upset, as he has been an absent figure for years. He gives her a pendant that causes her to awaken a Stand. Following a series of inexplicable events, Jotaro informs his daughter that a disciple of Dio framed her in order to kill her in prison. Jotaro attempts to break her out, but the frame-up is revealed to be a trap for Jotaro; following a confrontation against a Stand named Whitesnake, Jotaro's memories and Stand are stolen, putting him in a medically unresponsive state.

With Jolyne's new resolve of wanting to save her father, she swears to find the culprit hiding within the prison. Jolyne assembles a gang of fellow inmates, including Narciso Anasui, a convicted murderer; Ermes Costello, who wants to locate her sister's killer at Green Dolphin Street; and Weather Report, an amnesiac inmate. The gang also includes Emporio Alnino, a boy born within the prison whose mother was killed, and Foo Fighters, a sentient colony of plankton possessing a dead inmate. Jolyne recovers Jotaro's Stand and memories, and discovers that Whitesnake's user is the prison chaplain, Enrico Pucci; she manages to escape in pursuit of him.

At Cape Canaveral, Pucci follows the instructions in Dio's diary to achieve Heaven, evolving his Stand Whitesnake into C-Moon, with the ability to control gravity, and ultimately Made in Heaven, which gives him superhuman speed and accelerates time with the exception of living beings. During the ensuing battle, Jotaro arrives to help Jolyne and her group after recovering his Stand and memories. Pucci intends to bring humanity into the next cycle of time by accelerating time beyond the end of the universe, which will cause humanity to subconsciously know their fates and wipe the Joestar bloodline from existence as revenge for Dio. Using Made in Heaven, he kills off the group one-by-one, including Jotaro. However, Jolyne's sacrifice allows Emporio to survive long enough for Pucci to accidentally grant him Weather Report's eponymous Stand. He is then killed by Emporio, using Weather Report to immobilize Pucci through oxygen poisoning before finishing him off. After the universe reaches its end and begins anew, Emporio meets reincarnations of the rest of the cast, now living different but happier lives.

== Cast ==
Character	Japanese	English
Jolyne Cujoh	Fairouz Ai	Kira Buckland
Ermes Costello	Mutsumi Tamura	Tiana Camacho
Emporio Alnino	Atsumi Tanezaki	Casey Mongillo
Narciso Anasui	Daisuke Namikawa	Howard Wang
Weather Report	Yūichirō Umehara	Stephen Fu
Enrico Pucci	Tomokazu Seki	Yong Yea
Foo Fighters	Mariya Ise	Brittany Lauda
Atroe	Mariya Ise	Brittany Lauda
Dio Brando	Takehito Koyasu	Patrick Seitz
Jotaro Kujo	Daisuke Ono	Matthew Mercer
Johngalli A.	Satoshi Hino	David Matranga
Gwess	Momoko Taneichi	Amber Lee Connors
Thunder McQueen	Tōru Nara	Jas Patrick
Miraschon	Yui Kondo	Suzie Yeung
Lang Rangler	Chikahiro Kobayashi	Dave Wittenberg
Sports Maxx	Tsuyoshi Koyama	Kane Jungbluth-Murry
Gloria Costello	Akeno Watanabe	Heather Gonzalez
Mangako	Ryosuke Hara	Euguen Leon
Viviano Westwood	Yasuhiro Mamiya	John Eric Bentley
Kenzou	Mugihito	Bill Knight
Dragon's Dream	Chō	Brent Mukai
Guccio	Hiro Shimono	Henry Mason
D an G	Ryōta Takeuchi	Christopher Wehkamp
Yo-Yo Ma	Kappei Yamaguchi	Dino Andrade
Miuccia Miuller	Yuko Kaida	Morgan Laure
Sonny Likir	Chado Horii	Luis Bermudez
Ungalo	Takumi Yamazaki	Todd Haberkorn
Barry	—N/a	Euguen Leon
Rikiel	Makoto Furukawa	Ben Balmaceda
Donatello Versus	Takanori Hoshino	Isaac Robinson-Smith
Perla Pucci	Lynn	Lisa Reimold
Romeo Jisso	Gakuto Kajiwara	Clifford Chapin
Jolyne's mother	Hitomi Nabatame	Caitlin Glass
Corrupt lawyer	Hidenori Takahashi	Michael Schwalbe
Loccobarocco	Mitsuaki Kanuka	Arthur Romeo
Curly-haired convict	Yumi Hino	Cassie Ewulu
Narrator	Tōru Ōkawa	David Vincent

== Production and release ==
The series was announced during a live-streamed event in April 2021. Like all previous parts, Stone Ocean is produced by Warner Bros. Japan and animated by David Production. The season ran for 38 episodes.

In August 2021, the first trailer was released during a Stone Ocean YouTube event, with a worldwide release on Netflix on December 1, 2021, with the first 12 episodes. In Japan, the series is also televised on Tokyo MX, BS11 and MBS starting a month later on January 8, 2022, with Animax following on January 22. Composer Yugo Kanno returned from previous seasons. Episodes 13–24 began streaming on Netflix worldwide on September 1, 2022; episodes 25–38 premiered on December 1 of the same year. The opening theme from episodes 1–24 is "Stone Ocean" by Ichigo from Kishida Kyoudan & The Akeboshi Rockets, while the opening theme for episodes 25–38 is "Heaven's falling down" by Sana from Sajou no Hana. The ending theme for Episodes 1–37 is "Distant Dreamer" by Duffy. Episode 38's ending theme is "Roundabout" by Yes, which was originally the ending theme for season 1.

== Episodes ==
No. overall (Note: Order of episodes in the series continuing from the previous season)	No. in season (Note: Order of episodes within the season)	Title (Note: English episode titles are taken from Netflix. In instances where names are altered from the Japanese version, the original Japanese translation is used on the left while the edited Netflix title is used on the right.)	Storyboarded by	Directed by	Written by	Original release date	Japanese air date
153	1	"Stone Ocean"; Transliteration: "Sutōn Ōshan" (Japanese: 石作りの海(ストーンオーシャン))	Ken'ichi Suzuki	Toshiyuki Katō	Yasuko Kobayashi	December 1, 2021	January 8, 2022
In 2011, ten years after the events of Golden Wind, Jolyne Cujoh's boyfriend, Romeo Jisso, crashes into a pedestrian. Romeo convinces her to help him dispose of the body, but she is eventually arrested for the victim's death. As she prepares for her trial, her attorney gives her various items from her mother and a pendant from her estranged father, Jotaro Kujo, that contains a piece of a broken arrow that pierces her finger. While on remand at Green Dolphin Street Prison aka The Aquarium in Port St. Lucie, Florida, Jolyne meets and befriends an inmate named Ermes Costello. She discovers she can emit a long, thin thread from her body, which she can use to hear and attack people from a long distance. She uses it to rescue Ermes from two corrupt guards. Later, Jolyne's attorney talks her into a plea bargain for a reduced sentence, but she ends up getting sentenced to 15 years in prison when it is revealed the victim was still alive at the time before he was disposed of. She then discovers that her attorney was hired by Romeo's family to frame her for the accident, so she uses her new ability to choke the corrupt lawyer on the freeway and force him to crash.
154	2	"Stone Free / Prisoner FE40536: Jolyne Cujoh"; Transliteration: "Sutōn Furī" (Japanese: ストーン・フリー)	Toshiyuki Katō	Daisuke Chiba	Yasuko Kobayashi	December 1, 2021	January 15, 2022
In prison, Jolyne shares her cell with Gwess, a prisoner with drastic mood swings who has her father's pendant and a strange pet bird. She discovers that the bird is a hollowed-out shell containing a shrunken prison guard and deduces that Gwess also gained powers from the pendant. Gwess shrinks Jolyne and forces her to wear a mouse carcass so that she can sneak into the control room to deactivate the prison locks and help them escape. However, the increased distance from Gwess weakens her shrinking ability, causing Jolyne to slowly return to her normal size. On her way back, Jolyne is attacked by Gwess' vicious Stand, Goo Goo Dolls, (Note: "Cry Cry Dolls" in official English releases.) but she manages to fight back by materializing her own Stand. After Gwess reveals that Ermes sold her the pendant, Jolyne forces her cellmate to free her by viciously pummeling her with her Stand, which she names Stone Free. (Note: "Stone Ocean" in official English releases.)
155	3	"The Visitor (1)"; Transliteration: "Menkainin Sono Ichi" (Japanese: 面会人 その①)	Taizō Yoshida	Kunihiro Mori	Yasuko Kobayashi	December 1, 2021	January 22, 2022
Gwess demonstrates to Jolyne how money and power between inmates is manipulated throughout the prison. As Jolyne quickly adapts to the system, she comes across a mysterious boy dressed in a baseball uniform, who tells her that she'll be receiving a visitor the next day and to avoid going to the visitation room. When she decides to go anyway, he gives her a bone to protect herself. Jolyne is disgusted to find that the visitor is her father, Jotaro. He reveals that a blind assassin inmate named Johngalli A was responsible for the car accident and arranged for her long prison sentence in revenge against him for killing Dio. Jotaro offers to help her escape but she refuses, still bitter at him for being absent most of her life. Before she can leave, the two are suddenly shot at and wounded from the distant men's prison by Johngalli A. His Stand, Manhattan Transfer, (Note: "Downtown Transfer" in official English releases.) allows him to sense air currents and helps direct his sniper bullets.
156	4	"The Visitor (2)"; Transliteration: "Menkainin Sono Ni" (Japanese: 面会人 その②)	Taizō Yoshida	Tetsuji Nakamura	Yasuko Kobayashi	December 1, 2021	January 29, 2022
Jolyne attempts to confuse Johngalli A's Stand in the visitation room by triggering the fire sprinkler system. The mysterious boy instructs Jolyne to kick out the base of a pillar, which uncovers a secret passageway. Jotaro suggests that they escape, but Jolyne decides to try to save the boy from the enemy Stand as he has now become the target. She seemingly foils the assassin by using a broken gas pipe to throw off his sense of direction and immobilizes the Stand. But she realizes she's in a dream and manages to wake herself up by cutting her hand on the bone that the boy gave her earlier. She then finds herself, Jotaro, and the room covered in a corrosive slime.
157	5	"Prisoner of Love"; Transliteration: "Purizunā obu Ravu" (Japanese: プリズナー・オブ・ラヴ)	Katsuichi Nakayama	Katsuichi Nakayama	Yasuko Kobayashi	December 1, 2021	February 5, 2022
Jotaro is awakened by Jolyne and he uses his Stand, Star Platinum, to free them from the melting room. He begins to lead Jolyne to a beach where a submarine from the Speedwagon Foundation is waiting for them. However, they are shot at by Johngalli A, who disguised himself as a prison guard. The injured Jotaro realizes that he is the target and that the sniper is working with another Stand User who put him and Jolyne to sleep. The other attacker's Stand, named Whitesnake, (Note: "Pale Snake" in official English releases.) converts Jotaro's Stand and memories into discs and extracts them from him. As Jotaro falls into a coma, Jolyne finds out how much her father truly cared for her. She defeats Johngalli and leaves Jotaro at the beach to be picked up by the Speedwagon Foundation before returning to the prison in the hope of retrieving the discs and reviving him. Back inside, she contacts the boy, who tells her his name is Emporio and that he was born in the prison, where his inmate mother was killed by Whitesnake. Meanwhile, Whitesnake shoots Johngalli with his own gun to make it look like suicide.
158	6	"Ermes's Stickers"; Transliteration: "Erumesu no Shīru" (Japanese: エルメェスのシール)	Tatsuma Minamikawa	Tatsuma Minamikawa	Shin'ichi Inotsume	December 1, 2021	February 12, 2022
Jolyne has five years added to her sentence for the attempted prison break and is placed in solitary confinement in the Punishment Ward. Ermes wakes up in the Infirmary following a fever she developed after piercing herself on Jolyne's pendant only to find herself being robbed by the inmate janitor, Thunder McQueen. She discovers that she can produce stickers from the palm of her hand that duplicates whatever they touch, but if the sticker is removed or destroyed, the objects merge back together in a violent manner. She uses a sticker to attack McQueen and she sees two discs sticking out of his head. She takes one and finds it contains his memories, including one where he met Whitesnake. The self-pitying McQueen attempts to hang himself out of despair which causes his Stand Highway to Hell (Note: "Freeway Thru Hell" in official English releases.) to inflict his pain onto Ermes, but she uses her Stand to save herself. Ermes runs into Emporio, who informs her that the disc still inside McQueen contains his Stand – the discs come in pairs, a memory disc and a Stand disc which together holds a person's soul. McQueen attempts suicide which also effects Ermes, so she uses a sticker to incapacitate him and eject his Stand disc. She grabs the disc and plans revenge on Whitesnake for her ordeal as her Stand, Kiss, (Note: "Smack" in official English releases.) manifests itself.
159	7	"There's Six of Us!"; Transliteration: "Roku-nin Iru!" (Japanese: 6人いる！)	Jirō Fujimoto, Toshiyuki Katō	Masakazu Takahashi	Shōgo Yasukawa	December 1, 2021	February 19, 2022
Ermes gives McQueen's discs to Emporio for safekeeping and he lends the memory disc to Jolyne to see if there are any clues about Whitesnake and her father's discs. Meanwhile, two inmates are consumed by a blob-like monster at the prison farm near the swamp. The prison chief Loccobarocco assembles all the inmates and calls for volunteers to search for the escapees. Jolyne and Ermes volunteer along with an inmate named Atroe and two other women. They are forced to wear bracelets that will explode if they stray more than 50 meters away from the lead guard. Jolyne tells Ermes she learned from McQueen's memories that Whitesnake has dozens of Stand discs stored within one of the tractor tires on the farm. As they approach the wetlands, Ermes notices that there are six inmates when only five volunteered. The guard is suddenly attacked and dragged far away, which causes Atroe's bracelet to explode, killing her. Ermes is suddenly dragged into the water by an enemy Stand made up of multiplying, sentient plankton. Jolyne frees her and the Stand remains in the water, refusing to follow them inland. The two then confront the other three members of the search party to determine who the imposter is.
160	8	"Foo Fighters / F.F."; Transliteration: "Fū Faitāzu" (Japanese: フー・ファイターズ)	Katsumi Terahigashi	Eiichi Kuboyama	Shōgo Yasukawa	December 1, 2021	February 26, 2022
Jolyne and Ermes discover that two of the search party members were killed and possessed by extensions of their opponent, a plankton colony called Foo Fighters aka "F.F.", (Note: It is only known as "F.F." in official English releases.) who used the victims' remains to disguise itself. F.F. explains that it is both a Stand User and a Stand after Whitesnake granted it intelligence to guard the Stand discs for him. Jolyne chases F.F. into the nearby barn while Ermes attempts to prevent the Stand's double from dragging away the guard to trigger their bracelets. Ermes defeats the double by drawing it out of the water and exposing it to the dried-up corpse of one of the inmates. In the barn, F.F. gains the upper hand on Jolyne after covering the ground with water, but Jolyne uses Stone Free's threads to activate the tractor and drive the discs away. F.F. chases the tractor but falls apart as its body is absorbed by the dirt. Jolyne decides to spare the dying entity when she realizes it was protecting the discs for their own sake rather than for Whitesnake's and recruits F.F. as an ally. Jolyne finds Jotaro's Stand disc, but not his memory. F.F. possesses Atroe's corpse to join Jolyne and Ermes in prison, hiding Jotaro's Stand disc within her body. The farm is later investigated by Whitesnake and its user, Enrico Pucci, the prison's head priest.
161	9	"Debt Collector Marilyn Manson / Debt Collector Mary Lynn Manson"; Transliteration: "Toritatenin Maririn Manson" (Japanese: 取り立て人マリリン・マンソン)	Satoshi Ōsedo	Satoshi Ōsedo	Kazuyuki Fudeyasu, Yasuko Kobayashi	December 1, 2021	March 5, 2022
When an inmate thief named Miraschon approaches Pucci seeking parole, he inserts two discs into her, planning to use her skills to retrieve Jotaro's Stand disc. Meanwhile, in the exercise yard, F.F. slowly gets accustomed to Atroe's body and plays a game of catch with Jolyne. Miraschon appears and bets $100 that they cannot the catch ball one hundred times in a row. When they succeed, Miraschon challenges them to catch the ball another one hundred times for $1,000. Jolyne refuses, but Ermes accepts the bet and takes her place. When a guard confiscates the glove from Ermes, she is forced to cheat with her Stand, losing the bet. Miraschon's Stand, Marilyn Manson, (Note: "Mary Lynn Manson" in official English releases.) appears to extract the money from Ermes. Since Ermes does not have enough, Marilyn removes her liver to pay off the rest of the debt. Jolyne then bets that she can catch the ball one thousand times in return for everything that was taken from Ermes. Miraschon reenters the prison, forcing Jolyne and F.F. to continue to toss the ball while chasing her. The game is again interrupted by the guard who takes the ball, but Jolyne retrieves it with her thread and continues the game. Since they never agreed on a specific partner, Jolyne has Stone Free toss the ball at Miraschon one thousand times. As a result, she wins the bet, saves Ermes, and retrieves the two discs.
162	10	"Operation Savage Garden (Head to the Courtyard!) (1) / Operation Savage Guardian (Head to the Courtyard!) (1)"; Transliteration: "Saveji Gāden Sakusen (Nakaniwa e Mukae!) Sono Ichi" (Japanese: サヴェジ・ガーデン作戦（中庭へ向かえ！）その①)	Tatsuma Minamikawa	Tatsuma Minamikawa	Shin'ichi Inotsume	December 1, 2021	March 12, 2022
Jolyne uses her winnings from Miraschon's bets to buy time on the phone to call the Speedwagon Foundation. A representative instructs her to deliver Jotaro's Stand disc to "Savage Garden" (Note: "Savage Guardian" in official English releases.) at the courtyard in 20 minutes. On her way there, Emporio pulls her into the ghost of a music room from the prison's past as his Stand, Burning Down the House, (Note: "Burn the House Down" in official English releases.) enables him to manifest objects which no longer exist. He introduces her to an amnesiac Stand User named Weather Report (Note: "Weather Forecast" in official English releases.) who wants to help her. While demonstrating his Stand's power to control the weather, he spots an inmate named Lang Rangler following them. Rangler uses his Stand, Jumpin' Jack Flash, (Note: "Jumping Jack Spark" in official English releases.) to manipulate gravity and suspend Jolyne in mid-air, making her and anything she touches weightless. He steals Jotaro's Stand disc from her, but when he retreats, Weather's Stand counters his abilities with atmospheric pressure. Weather then touches Jolyne to also become weightless and they chase Rangler into the main factory area to retrieve the disc.
163	11	"Operation Savage Garden (Head to the Courtyard!) (2) / Operation Savage Guardian (Head to the Courtyard!) (2)"; Transliteration: "Saveji Gāden Sakusen (Nakaniwa e Mukae!) Sono Ni" (Japanese: サヴェジ・ガーデン作戦（中庭へ向かえ！）その②)	Yūsuke Kubo	Katsuichi Nakayama	Kazuyuki Fudeyasu	December 1, 2021	March 19, 2022
Pucci requests access to recent phone recordings to learn more about Jolyne's call to the Speedwagon Foundation. In the factory room, Jolyne and Weather find themselves in a zero-gravity vacuum being shot at by Rangler's metal projectiles and in danger of suffocating from a lack of oxygen with their blood leaking from their bodies. Weather uses his Stand and the remaining air to create suits of clouds that allow them to breathe and halt their blood loss for a short time. Jolyne figures out that Jumpin' Jack Flash has a limited range in the room and tries to help Weather reach it so he can manipulate the air, but his suit suffers considerable damage from Rangler's attacks. Rangler attempts to rupture her protective suit, but Jolyne attaches multiple threads to his projectiles, allowing her to pull him into the zero-gravity vacuum area which causes his blood to boil. He destroys Jolyne's suit by throwing an exploding glass bottle at her, but Weather saves her by giving her the rest of his cloud suit. Rangler is forced to reinstate gravity, but the incoming burst of air pushes him towards Jolyne, allowing her to pummel him with Stone Free. She uses Rangler's card to request a guard to open the door, but she is greeted by Pucci.
164	12	"Torrential Downpour Warning"; Transliteration: "Shūchū Gōu Keihō Hatsurei" (Japanese: 集中豪雨警報発令)	Taizō Yoshida	Hikaru Murata, Toshiyuki Katō	Shōgo Yasukawa	December 1, 2021	March 26, 2022
Back in 1988, Dio told Pucci that he found a way to reach Heaven without dying and wrote the instructions on how to do so in a notebook that Jotaro burned after killing him. In the present, Pucci plans to retrieve the contents of Dio's notebook through Jotaro's memory disc. He allows Jolyne to reach the courtyard to avoid revealing Whitesnake, but she is shot by a guard under his control and drops the disc. Weather tries desperately to help Jolyne by making it rain poison dart frogs which kill the guard while she protects herself from the falling frogs by creating a shelter with her threads. Pucci also manages to evade them and when the deluge stops, he instructs Whitesnake to search the courtyard for Jotaro's Stand disc and Jolyne's body. Whitesnake locates the Stand disc, but Jolyne uses her threads to grab the disc and pass it to Savage Garden, a trained carrier pigeon from the Speedwagon Foundation. Pucci withdraws Whitesnake to prevent Jolyne from identifying its user. In a post-credits scene, Whitesnake meets Sports Maxx (Note: "Sports Maximum" in official English releases.) and asks him to test his abilities on a bone from Dio's body.
165	13	"Kiss of Love and Revenge (1) / Smack of Love and Revenge (1)"; Transliteration: "Ai to Fukushū no Kissu Sono Ichi" (Japanese: 愛と復讐のキッス その①)	Toshiyuki Katō	Daishi Katō	Shin'ichi Inotsume	September 1, 2022	October 8, 2022
Jolyne and F.F. discover that Ermes had herself arrested and sent to prison so she could track down and kill Sports Maxx, a notorious gangster who murdered her older sister, Gloria. After several days of following him, Ermes uses her Stand to trap Maxx in a sewer pipe to drown him. While he is trapped and drowns in sewage, Maxx activates his Stand Limp Bizkit, (Note: "Limp Viscuit" in official English releases.) which has the ability to bring the dead back to life as invisible zombies. He uses his Stand to animate a stuffed bird and an alligator to viciously attack Ermes, Jolyne, and F.F.
166	14	"Kiss of Love and Revenge (2) / Smack of Love and Revenge (2)"; Transliteration: "Ai to Fukushū no Kissu Sono Ni" (Japanese: 愛と復讐のキッス その②)	Taizō Yoshida	Shingo Tanabe	Shin'ichi Inotsume	September 1, 2022	October 15, 2022
After F.F. defeats the invisble alligator, Ermes and Jolyne realize that Maxx has become an invisible zombie and escaped the pipe after he died and drowned in the sewage. The invisible Maxx lures the two women into the prison's mausoleum and revives several dead prisoners to take revenge on Ermes for killing him. Ermes allows herself to be attacked and uses Kiss's ability to locate Maxx. Though Maxx takes a bite out of her head, Ermes completely annihilates him, ejecting Whitesnake's discs before she passes out from her injuries. Jolyne reviews the memories in Maxx's discs before she is captured and taken to the prison's Disciplinary Wing.
167	15	"Ultra Security House Unit"; Transliteration: "Urutora Sekyuriti Chōbatsubō" (Japanese: ウルトラセキュリティ懲罰房)	Jirō Fujimoto, Mamoru Kurosawa	Shō Sugawara	Kazuyuki Fudeyasu	September 1, 2022	October 22, 2022
F.F. and Emporio retrieve Maxx's memory disc and find out that Whitesnake forced Maxx to bring one of Dio's bones back to life. Jolyne allowed herself to be taken to the Disciplinary Wing in order to find the bone, lure Whitesnake's user to her, and ultimately retrieve Jotaro's memory disc. Narciso Anasui, (Note: "Narciso Anastasia" in official English releases.) a Stand User who was arrested for murdering his unfaithful girlfriend, agrees to help F.F. rescue Jolyne, as he has fallen for her and wants to marry her. Anasui's Stand, Diver Down, (Note: "Diver Drive" in official English releases.) can store itself inside any surface and manipulate it from the inside. To prevent Jolyne from finding the bone, Pucci sends four Stand Users to the Disciplinary Wing to assassinate her. One of them uses the Stand Survivor to enrage guard Viviano Westwood, causing him to kill his partner and open all of the cells for a free-for-all.
168	16	"The Secret of Guard Westwood"; Transliteration: "Kanshu Uesutouddo no Himitsu" (Japanese: 看守ウエストウッドの秘密)	Katsuichi Nakayama, Toshiyuki Katō	Katsuichi Nakayama	Kazuyuki Fudeyasu	September 1, 2022	October 29, 2022
Jolyne faces off against Westwood while fighting off Survivor's influence and figures out that he is a Stand User. Westwood's Stand, Planet Waves, (Note: "Starlight Waves" in official English releases.) attracts small meteorites towards him that seriously wound his enemies and disintegrate before they hit him. During their fight, Jolyne notices one of the inmates taking Dio's bone. Jolyne ultimately defeats the berserk guard by using his boot to store the force of a meteorite and hit him with it.
169	17	"Enter the Dragon's Dream / Enter the Drake's Dream"; Transliteration: "Moe yo Doragonzu Dorīmu" (Japanese: 燃えよ龍の夢(ドラゴンズ・ドリーム))	Eiichi Kuboyama, Mamoru Kurosawa	Eiichi Kuboyama	Shōgo Yasukawa	September 1, 2022	November 5, 2022
Jolyne finds that only two other inmates are left standing after the brawl in the Disciplinary Wing. F.F. arrives in time to fight one of the survivors, an elderly former cult leader named Kenzou. Kenzou reveals his Stand, Dragon's Dream, (Note: "Drake's Dream" in official English releases.) which allows him to use feng shui to find the luckiest angles for his attacks and cause his opponent to suffer great misfortune. When Kenzou forces F.F. to trigger the Stand's effect, a piece of metal from a malfunctioning ceiling fan detaches itself and slices off the top part of their head.
170	18	"Enter the Foo Fighters / Enter the F.F."; Transliteration: "Moe yo Fū Faitāzu" (Japanese: 燃えよフー・ファイターズ)	Taizō Yoshida	Tadako Nagai	Shōgo Yasukawa	September 1, 2022	November 12, 2022
F.F. survives having their head sliced open and manages to land a few shots on Kenzou. They attempt to get water and heal themselves, only to trigger Dragon's Dream once more and become trapped in an active electric chair. Before the chair activates, F.F. uses Kenzou's sweat to create a reflection of his Stand, tricking him into standing in an unlucky area and allowing them to electrocute him as well. Jolyne realizes that both parties survived the electrocution and jumps down to save F.F. Kenzou attempts to finish her, but Anasui uses Diver Down to disassemble Kenzou's legs and rearrange them into springs, rendering him unable to fight.
171	19	"Birth of the 'Green'"; Transliteration: "'Midoriiro' no Tanjō" (Japanese: ｢緑色｣の誕生)	Tatsuma Minamikawa	Masakazu Takahashi	Shōgo Yasukawa	September 1, 2022	November 19, 2022
The three confront the prisoner who had Dio's bone, only to find that he and the rest of the inmates are turning into plants when exposed to sunlight. Jolyne, who has also begun changing, notices that the bone has used the energy from the inmates to create a fruit looking like a green baby, which Jolyne seizes. While leaving, Anasui encounters Guccio, the Stand User of Survivor. Anasui converts Guccio's ribcage into a booby trap to prevent the remaining Stand User, D an G, from following them. D an G's Stand, Yo-Yo Ma, (Note: "Ya-Ya Ma" in official English releases.) suddenly appears near the group and swallows the green baby. F.F. stays behind to eliminate D an G while Jolyne, Anasui and utilize the servile Yo-Yo Ma to escape into the wetlands in an airboat, however F.F.'s lower jaw begins to dissolve from exposure to Yo-Yo Ma's toxic saliva.
172	20	"F.F. – The Witness"; Transliteration: "Efu Efu – Mokugekisha" (Japanese: F・F－目撃者)	Kōji Hōri	Naoko Takeichi	Kazuyuki Fudeyasu	September 1, 2022	November 26, 2022
In the wetlands, Jolyne and Anasui approach the main prison in the airboat driven by Yo-Yo Ma and are attacked by guards but Yo-Yo Ma helps drive them off. Jolyne's tongue begins slowly dissolving after she is bitten by mosquitoes carrying Yo-Yo Ma's acidic spit. She attempts to warn Anasui of the Stand's power, but he is more intent on kissing her. Anasui finally gets the message and uses Diver Down to connect Yo-Yo Ma's brain to a frog's brain, neutralizing the Stand. Back at the Disciplinary Wing, F.F. attempts to kill D an' G and in the process, discovers that Pucci is Whitesnake's user.
173	21	"Awaken"; Transliteration: "Mezame" (Japanese: 目醒め)	Yūsuke Kubo	Kazuo Nogami	Kazuyuki Fudeyasu	September 1, 2022	December 3, 2022
When Pucci attempts to steal their memories, F.F. sacrifices Atroe's body to kill D an' G, destroying Yo-Yo Ma in the process. F.F. attempts to recover with water from a faucet to inform Jolyne of Pucci's identity, but Whitesnake forces the water to boil, disintegrating F.F.. Meanwhile, Jolyne and Anasui attempt to retrieve the green baby, but find themselves shrinking whenever they get close to it because of its Stand, Green, Green Grass of Home. (Note: "Green, Green, Green Home" in official English releases.) Anasui traps the Stand in a bottle, but becomes trapped underneath the bottle's weight as it threatens to crush him. The baby and its Stand stop attacking them when it notices the star-shaped birthmark on Jolyne's shoulder, but Anasui senses it has dark intentions and plans to kill it.
174	22	"Time for Heaven! New Moon! New Priest!"; Transliteration: "Tengoku no Toki! Shingetsu no Toki! Nyū Shinpu!" (Japanese: 天国の時！新月の時！新(ニュー)神父！)	Taizō Yoshida	Tōru Hamasaki	Kazuyuki Fudeyasu	September 1, 2022	December 10, 2022
Before Pucci can take F.F.'s Stand disc and determine Jolyne's whereabouts, he discovers that F.F. was communicating with Weather Report using a guard's transceiver. Weather uses his Stand to create heavy rain above them, restoring F.F. and allowing them to escape. After seemingly reuniting with Weather, the two meet up with Jolyne and Anasui and reveal that Pucci is Whitesnake's user. Anasui announces his intent to kill the green baby, but the Weather with them is revealed to be a disguised Whitesnake and fatally wounds him and F.F.. Pucci arrives and attacks Jolyne, who prevents him from escaping with a pair of handcuffs. When she begins to overpower him, Pucci tosses Jotaro's memory disc into the dying Anasui, risking its destruction, forcing her to abandon the fight and retrieve the disc. After reciting 14 key phrases and offering a bone from his arm, Pucci fuses with the green baby and the prisoners' souls contained within it. Meanwhile, using the last of their strength, F.F. heals Anasui's wounds and ejects Jotaro's memory disc before farewelling Jolyne and passing on.
175	23	"Jail House Lock! / Lock of the Jail!"; Transliteration: "Jeiru Hausu Rokku!" (Japanese: ジェイル・ハウス・ロック!)	Mamoru Kurosawa	Shigeki Awai	Yasuko Kobayashi	September 1, 2022	December 17, 2022
Having fused with the green baby, Pucci leaves Green Dolphin Street Prison to enact the next part of Dio's plan to attain Heaven. After viewing her father's memory disc and discovering Pucci's plans, Jolyne resolves to escape the prison and stop him. As she and Emporio contemplate breaking out, they are confronted by the prison's head guard, Miu Miu. (Note: "Mew Mew" in official English releases.) Miu Miu uses her Stand Jail House Rock (Note: "Jailhouse Lock" in official English releases.) to make Jolyne suffer from short-term memory loss that limits her to only remembering three things at a time. Miu Miu attempts to prevent Jolyne from retaining her memories, but Jolyne resolves to meet Emporio, who has also been affected by Jail House Rock.
176	24	"Jailbreak..."; Transliteration: "Datsugoku e..." (Japanese: 脱獄へ・・・)	Tomohiro Furukawa	Eiichi Kuboyama	Shōgo Yasukawa	September 1, 2022	December 24, 2022
Jolyne reaches Emporio's room, where he remembers that he intended to print an image of the head guard's face. However, Miu Miu had followed Jolyne and shoots both Emporio and his computer. Jolyne chases down Miu Miu, but the head guard summons multiple officers to prevent Jolyne from remembering her. Emporio uses Stone Free's string to print out a binary image of Miu Miu, allowing Jolyne to identify her as the enemy and finally defeat her. Holding Miu Miu hostage, the pair collect Ermes from the medical ward, and they escape the prison together. Meanwhile, as Pucci heads toward his final destination at the Kennedy Space Center at Cape Canaveral, he begins to lose control of his Stand which shows signs of a new ability.
177	25	"Bohemian Rhapsody (1) / Bohemian Ecstatic (1)"; Transliteration: "Bohemian Rapusodī Sono Ichi" (Japanese: 自由人の狂想曲(ボヘミアン・ラプソディー) その①)	Koji Iwai	Hasutani Toru	Shōgo Yasukawa	December 1, 2022	January 7, 2023
After learning of Jolyne, Ermes and Emporio's jailbreak, Anasui and Weather Report escape from Green Dolphin as well to join them in tracking down Pucci. On his way to Cape Canaveral, Pucci encounters an injured drug addict and two troubled youths at a hospital who appear to be Stand Users. He is grabbed and stabbed in the neck by the drug addict who is then shot by the police. Near Orlando, Anasui and Weather hitch a ride with an old man to follow Pucci. On board the truck, various fictional characters appear, such as Pinocchio and Snow White, and the Seven Dwarves, and over the radio, they hear many more fictional characters are appearing. Anasui suddenly finds that his and the truck driver's souls have been separated from their bodies. Weather is not affected as his amnesia prevents him from recognizing any of the characters. After killing Pinocchio, Anasui sees the old man transform into the Big Bad Wolf and beheads him. Anasui is quite confused when he sees the truck drive past with himself and Weather, who suspects a Stand user is responsible for these events.
178	26	"Bohemian Rhapsody (2) / Bohemian Ecstatic (2)"; Transliteration: "Bohemian Rapusodī Sono Ni" (Japanese: 自由人の狂想曲(ボヘミアン・ラプソディー) その②)	Tatsuma Minamikawa	Fumihiro Ueno	Shōgo Yasukawa	December 1, 2022	January 14, 2023
Anasui's soul attempts to catch up to Weather and finds that more people are being separated from their bodies by the fictional characters by an enemy Stand. After seeing a store owner become the prince who saves Snow White, he realizes that everyone is being forced to live out the characters' stories. He then becomes the wolf from the Wolf and the Seven Young Goats and is chased by the mother goat wielding scissors. Weather is separated from his body by van Gogh's self-portrait, who attempts to make him shoot himself in the head twice just as the real van Gogh did. Weather attempts to track the Stand User, but finds that he has already left Florida on a plane. The Stand is revealed to be Bohemian Rhapsody (Note: "Bohemian Ecstatic" in official English releases.), wielded by the drug addict Ungalo, one of Dio's illegitimate sons who was recruited by Pucci. Weather ultimately defeats the Stand by using van Gogh's artistic talent to create a new character on the pavement and a story that sends the fictitious characters back to their worlds and returns everyone else to reality, leaving Ungalo comatose. Meanwhile, Jolyne stops by a remorseful Romeo's house and convinces him to lend her money and his personal helicopter.
179	27	"Sky High / Sky Guy"; Transliteration: "Sukai Hai" (Japanese: スカイ・ハイ)	Yasufumi Soejima	Tsutomu Murakami	Shin'ichi Inotsume	December 1, 2022	January 21, 2023
Jolyne, Ermes, and Emporio are forced to crash their helicopter as they are attacked by Dio's next child, Rikiel. Rikiel suffered panic attacks until Pucci exposed his Stand, Sky High, (Note: "Sky Guy" in official English releases.) which gives him the ability to control rods that extract body heat and attack his foes internally. Jolyne counters his ability by lighting herself on fire, forcing Rikiel to do the same so he could target Jolyne's brain stem. However, she is still able to track him down thanks to his Joestar lineage and beats him down. Rikiel then uses his Stand to remove his body's ability to feel pain to force Jolyne to choose between killing him or letting him kill her. However, she manages to avoid both options by placing his hand on her neck which prevented her heat from being removed. Rikiel believes Pucci will use Jolyne's determination and luck to his advantage and reveals that Weather is Pucci's younger brother before Ermes knocks him out.
180	28	"Heaven Is at Hand: Three Days Until the New Moon"; Transliteration: "Tengoku no Toki: Shingetsu Made Ato San-Nichi" (Japanese: 天国の時 新月まであと3日)	Shinji Itadaki	Tetsuji Nakamura	Kazuyuki Fudeyasu	December 1, 2022	January 28, 2023
Jolyne and her team locate Pucci and the last of Dio's sons, Donatello Versus, at the Orlando hospital. Jolyne instructs Emporio to contact the Speedwagon Foundation and deliver Jotaro's memory disc to them while she and Ermes go inside to fight Pucci. Versus awakens his Stand, Under World, (Note: "Netherworld" in official English releases.) which creates a large hole in their room that he and Pucci hide in. When Jolyne goes inside the hole to investigate, she suddenly finds herself inside a plane and signals Ermes to pull her back. Ermes ends up falling in with her after being deceived by a memory of Sports Maxx. They find out that they are in a plane that crashed in 2005 and have minutes before the accident is recreated.
181	29	"Under World / Netherworld"; Transliteration: "Andā Wārudo" (Japanese: アンダー・ワールド)	Mamoru Kurosawa	Tatsuya Kyogoku	Kazuyuki Fudeyasu	December 1, 2022	February 4, 2023
From his rough upbringing and his encounter with Pucci, Versus discovers that his Stand ability is to excavate memories and events of people from the Earth. During the fight, he grows increasingly agitated at Pucci for belittling him and secretly steals Weather's memory disc from the priest. Jolyne attempts to escape through the plane's emergency exit, but Versus gets her trapped in the memory of a jet fighter who also crashed in the area. She gets in contact with Emporio, who uses his computer to relay to them the events that happened. He instructs Jolyne to crash the jet into the plane and then for her and Ermes to find the two seats of the only passengers that survived the crash. When they arrive there, Versus brings down some children from the hospital to force them to choose between saving themselves or the kids. They manage to save everyone by hiding themselves and the children inside the bodies of the replicants of the surviving passengers using their respective Stand abilities. The cornered Versus uses his Stand to return Weather's memories to him, causing rainbows to suddenly appear.
182	30	"Heavy Weather (1) / Heavy Forecast (1)"; Transliteration: "Hebī Wezā Sono Ichi" (Japanese: ヘビー・ウェザー その①)	Jirō Fujimoto	Junya Jitsusei	Shin'ichi Inotsume	December 1, 2022	February 11, 2023
After regaining his memories, Weather develops a more aggressive and sinister attitude as he becomes obsessed with finding Pucci. Anasui, disturbed by Weather's sudden change in personality, follows him. Pucci and Versus escape the hospital as Weather's evolved Stand, Heavy Weather, (Note: "Heavy Forecast" in official English releases.) begins to affect the entire city. Anyone exposed to the rainbows in the area begins secreting snails and eventually transforms into a snail themselves. Jolyne and Ermes decide to track Versus, who is attempting to find Emporio and get Jotaro's memory disc to learn the secrets of obtaining Heaven. As Versus uses Jolyne's memory to locate Emporio and knock him out, Jolyne and Ermes partially transform after touching the snails. Jolyne prevents Versus from escaping with her father's disc by infecting both him and Emporio. As they hijack a car to find Weather, they discover that predatory beetles have appeared and are eating the snails.
183	31	"Heavy Weather (2) / Heavy Forecast (2)"; Transliteration: "Hebī Wezā Sono Ni" (Japanese: ヘビー・ウェザー その②)	Yūsuke Kubo	Yūsuke Kubo	Shin'ichi Inotsume	December 1, 2022	February 18, 2023
In a flashback to 1972, a mother with a stillborn baby swaps it for one of two twins born on the same day. Fifteen years later, the second twin, seminarian Enrico Pucci, encountered Dio who cured his disfigured foot and gave him a Stand arrowhead. A year later, when the mother confessed to Pucci that she swapped her deceased child with a twin, calling him Wes Bluemarine (Weather), Pucci realized his brother was alive. When Pucci discovered Wes was dating his younger sister, Perla, he could not tell her because of the Seal of Confession. He hired a P.I. to separate them, however after the P.I. learned Weather's adoptive mother married an African-American he and his Ku Klux Klan associates beat them up and lynched Wes. When Perla thought Wes had died, she committed suicide. Her death sent Pucci into despair, causing the arrow to pierce him and causing both twins to develop their Stands. Weather's inability to kill himself caused him to lose control of his Stand and produce a plague of snails. Pucci used Whitesnake to remove Weather's memories before sending him to the prison where he worked. These tragic events inspired Pucci to seek out Dio and become his disciple.
184	32	"Heavy Weather (3) / Heavy Forecast (3)"; Transliteration: "Hebī Wezā Sono San" (Japanese: ヘビー・ウェザー その③)	Shinji Itadaki	Shinji Nagata	Yasuko Kobayashi	December 1, 2022	February 25, 2023
Weather pleads for Anasui to kill him after he takes revenge on Pucci as he is no longer unable to control Heavy Weather. They are suddenly ambushed by the priest, who cuts off Weather's legs as Anasui's limbs transform into slimy appendages because of the rainbows. Pucci recalled that blind people were unaffected by the rainbows and disables his sight, making him immune to Heavy Weather's ability. Weather uses Pucci's blindness to his advantage by freezing his blood which is flowing on the ground to form spikes which pierce Pucci's body and creating wind to blow him closer. He gains the upper hand, but before he can finish Pucci off, he is interrupted by the arrival of Jolyne and her allies. This brief distraction allows Pucci to murder Weather and Versus in the ensuing chaos, before using his Stand to escape. As Jolyne and her friends mourn Weather, they find his Stand's disc on his corpse and take it with them.
185	33	"Gravity of the New Moon"; Transliteration: "Shingetsu no Jūryoku" (Japanese: 新月の重力)	Koji Iwai	Tetsuji Nakamura	Kazuyuki Fudeyasu	December 1, 2022	March 4, 2023
A day after Weather's death, Jolyne sends Jotaro's memory disc to the Speedwagon Foundation to help her father's recovery. Her group drives towards the Kennedy Space Center following Pucci, but as they approach Cape Canaveral, they are pulled back as gravity is now being directed sideways by Pucci's Stand which has fully fused with the green baby to become C-Moon. (Note: "See Moon" in official English releases.) Ermes falls behind after being hit by some debris while Jolyne, Emporio, and Anasui pull themselves horizontally along the roadside barrier towards the Space Center. Pucci's evolved Stand strikes Jolyne's right hand which begins to turn inside out.
186	34	"C-Moon (1) / See Moon (1)"	Taizo Yoshida	Eiichi Kuboyama	Shōgo Yasukawa	December 1, 2022	March 11, 2023
Jolyne and Emporio deduce that C-Moon has the ability to reverse the direction of gravity. She tricks C-Moon into striking her again to return her body to normal. Using Anasui as a counterweight, she wraps her threads around the Stand's neck to choke it. However, before she can capitalize on the situation, Pucci reveals himself and causes another shift in gravity. He instructs C-Moon to attack Jolyne's heart, turning it inside out, reversing the blood flow to her brain, and seemingly killing her. However, Emporio receives a text from Jotaro informing him that he's nearby and that Jolyne is still alive. Pucci is also aware of her survival, so Anasui decides to attack him to protect Jolyne.
187	35	"C-Moon (2) / See Moon (2)"	Mamoru Kurosawa	Shohei Miyake	Shōgo Yasukawa	December 1, 2022	March 18, 2023
Pucci attempts to find Jolyne and finish her off while also fighting Anasui. He eventually locates her and finds that she discovered a way to prevent her body from being turned inside out, delaying the process by turning her threads into Mobius strips each time C-Moon strikes her. Pucci grabs a security officer's gun to shoot her, but she is rescued by the arrival of Jotaro and Ermes, who used a harpoon directed from the Speedwagon Foundation to catch up to them. Pucci begins floating in a door frame and realizes he doesn't need to wait 36 hours for the new moon as long as he can rise high enough to achieve the appropriate gravity requirements to further evolve his Stand. Jotaro uses Star Platinum's ability to stop time and throw the harpoon at him, but Pucci turns his eyes at the last second to avoid a fatal blow. Pucci then levitates a display space shuttle to ascend to the optimal elevation.
188	36	"Made in Heaven (1) / Maiden Heaven (1)"; Transliteration: "Meido in Hebun Sono Ichi" (Japanese: メイド・イン・ヘブン その①)	Katsuichi Nakayama	Katsuichi Nakayama	Shōgo Yasukawa	December 1, 2022	March 25, 2023
A blinding light from Pucci indicates that he has successfully evolved his Stand to its final form. Jolyne and her allies wake up 200 meters away from the shuttle but are unable to detect Pucci's location. When man-made objects and nature begin moving at high speed, they realize Pucci's Stand can accelerate time, and he approaches them as a blur at apparent superhuman speed. Jotaro discovers that his own ability to stop time has been reduced because of Pucci's time acceleration, leaving them open to his lightning-fast attacks. They move to a nearby rooftop and attempt to find a way to counter Pucci's new ability which he names Made in Heaven. (Note: "Maiden Heaven" in official English releases.)
189	37	"Made in Heaven (2) / Maiden Heaven (2)"; Transliteration: "Meido in Hebun Sono Ni" (Japanese: メイド・イン・ヘブン その②)	Shinji Itadaki, Kenichi Suzuki	Hasutani Toru	Shin'ichi Inotsume	December 1, 2022	April 1, 2023
Before Pucci can finish them off, Emporio uses his ghost room gun and fires a bullet with Ermes' sticker on it to fly them away. Anasui instructs him to land them in the ocean to visually track Pucci's movements. Anasui anticipates that Made in Heaven will attack him first, enabling Jotaro to stop time and finish off the priest. As time continues to accelerate, Anasui is impaled by Pucci, so Jotaro stops time. Unfortunately, before he can attack, he finds that Pucci used Stone Free to murder Anasui and threw knives at Jolyne just as Dio had done to him before, forcing him to save his daughter instead. Pucci kills Jotaro and Ermes and wounds Jolyne. Jolyne escapes with Emporio by tying them to a dolphin with her threads, but then sacrifices herself to give him time to escape. Emporio watches in horror as time accelerates even faster beyond the end of the universe, but then suddenly finds himself back in Green Dolphin Street Prison.
190	38	"What a Wonderful World / It's a Wonderful World"; Transliteration: "Howatto a Wandafuru Wārudo" (Japanese: ホワット・ア・ワンダフル・ワールド)	Katsuichi Nakayama, Mamoru Kurosawa	Toshiyuki Kato, Kenichi Suzuki	Yasuko Kobayashi	December 1, 2022	April 8, 2023
Back in the prison, Emporio sees imitations of Jolyne and Jotaro in the visiting center. Pucci explains that they are in a new universe where everyone who died will not return while everyone who survived will know what happens in the future, and he only brought them back so he could tie up loose ends by killing Emporio. Pucci chases Emporio to his ghost room to finish him off, however, Emporio tricks the priest into pushing Weather's Stand disc into his head, given to him by Jolyne before she died. Emporio uses Weather's Stand to fill the room with pure oxygen, causing Pucci to suffer oxygen toxicity at a hastened rate. Pucci furiously begs Emporio to stop so that Made In Heaven can complete its cycle, or else his work will be undone and render his ambitions pointless. Emporio refuses, declaring that fate has already defeated him as it will always follow the path of justice, and Weather's Stand promptly pummels Pucci to death. As a result, Made in Heaven's effect is undone as the universe ends and begins anew once more. Emporio then finds himself at a roadside gas station where he meets a hitchhiker named Eldis and a couple named Irene and Anakis, who appear to be reincarnations of Ermes, Jolyne, and Anasui respectively. Irene offers to take Emporio and the hitchhiker with them as they travel to meet Irene's father. Upon seeing Irene's star-shaped birthmark, Emporio tearfully introduces himself to her. They drive off, later picking up another hitchhiker who resembles Weather Report.

== Home media release ==
=== Japan ===
Warner Bros. Japan (Blu-ray, Region A)
Box	Discs	Episodes	Release date	Ref.
1	2	1–12	November 30, 2022	
2	2	13–24	February 24, 2023	
3	3	25–38	May 31, 2023	

=== North America ===
Viz Media (Blu-ray, Region A)
Volume	Discs	Episodes	Release date	Ref.
Part 1	3	1–18	January 23, 2024	
Part 2	3	19–38	September 17, 2024	

== Reception ==
Stone Ocean's first twelve episodes premiered as the most watched title on Netflix among Japanese viewers, and the sixth most among American viewers.
