= Yong Yea =

American YouTuber and voice actor

YongYea
- Occupations: YouTuber; voice actor

YouTube information
- Channel: YongYea
- Years active: 2012–present
- Genres: Gaming; voice acting
- Subscribers: 1.17 million
- Views: 670 million
- Last updated: October 22, 2025
- Website: www.yongyeavo.com

Yong Yea is an American YouTuber and voice actor. He is known for his YouTube channel, which covers gaming news. He is also known for his voice acting career, primarily in anime and gaming, which includes such roles as the English voice of Kazuma Kiryu from the Like a Dragon series since 2023 and Enrico Pucci from Jojo's Bizarre Adventure: Stone Ocean.

Yong Yea was born to Korean parents and was raised in Venezuela. He moved to the United States at age 14, and became involved in theatrical productions. According to the biography on his website, he works out of Studio City, Los Angeles.

== Filmography ==
=== Television ===
Year	Title	Role(s)	Notes	Source
2019	Welcome to Demon School! Iruma Kun	Marbas, Schenell	English dub	
2021	Beyblade Burst Surge	Hyperion		
2021	Jojo's Bizarre Adventure: Stone Ocean	Enrico Pucci, Pale Snake, C-Moon	Season 5	
2022	Lupin the 3rd Part 6	Sherlock Holmes		
2022	Thermae Romae Novae	Regulus		
2022	The Prince of Tennis II: U-17 World Cup	Junichi Sasabe		
2023	The Misfit of Demon King Academy	Ziek Ozma	Season 2	
2023	Junji Ito Maniac: Japanese Tales of the Macabre	Amino	Episode: "The Thing That Drifted Ashore"	
2023	Demon Slayer: Kimetsu no Yaiba	Sekido	Season 3	
2023	Rurouni Kenshin	Jin'e Udo		
2024	The Seven Deadly Sins: Four Knights of the Apocalypse	Ironside, Nob		
2024	The Grimm Variations	The Teacher	Episode 6: "Pied Piper of Hamelin"	
2025	Sakamoto Days	Asakura		
2026	Needy Girl Overdose	Otaku Customer		

=== Web ===
Year	Title	Role(s)	Notes
2022	Death Battle	Homelander, Sanji, VEGA	3 episodes
2026	Run Monster Run	Allseer	Pilot episode

=== Film ===
Year	Title	Role(s)	Notes	Source
2019	The Legend of Hei	Guanxuan, Biggie	English dub	
2020	The Island of Giant Insects	Satoshi Oda		
2020	The Lyosacks Movie	Vince Ackerman		
2023	Sword Art Online Progressive: Scherzo of Deep Night	Wolfgang		
2023	The First Slam Dunk	Yohei Mito	English dub	
2024	My Oni Girl	Izuru, Mashima, Shinpei, Asahi		
2024	Inside Out 2	Lance Slashblade, Additional voices		

=== Video games ===
Year	Title	Role(s)	Notes	Source
2014	Smite	Tokyo Knight Ares, Oni Hunter Rama		
2016	Paladins: Champions of the Realm	Vatu		
2017	Bulletville	Buff		
2019	Lorelai	Jimmy		
2019	Pokemon Masters	Larry	English dub	
2020	The Legend of Heroes: Trails into Reverie	Arios Maclaine	English dub	
2020	Per Aspera	Nian Zhen		
2021	Cookie Run: Kingdom	Madeleine Cookie, Archbishop Cream Cookie, Baby Cookie		
2021	Genshin Impact	Xiaoyan, Jingming, Yi'nian	Version 1.3 update; English dub	
2021	Dark Deity	Monroe Val-Burin		
2021	Lost Judgment	Yasutaka Shirakaba	English dub	
2021	Agatha Christie - Hercule Poirot: The First Cases	Ernesto de Silva		
2022	Lost Ark	Additional voices		
2022	Crisis Core: Final Fantasy VII Reunion	Additional voices		
2022	Blind Fate: Edo No Yami	Yami	Lead role	
2022	Lost Judgment: The Kaito Files	Yasutaka Shirakaba	Downloadable content (DLC); English dub	
2022	The Darkest Tales	Teddy	Lead role	
2022	Genshin Impact	Nasser	Version 3.2 update; English dub	
2022	RWBY: Arrowfell	Bram Thornmane	English dub	
2023	Path of the Midnight Sun	Menmus		
2023	Rogue Shift	Edan Watts		
2023	Disgaea 7: Vows of the Virtueless	Gachiyasu	English dub	
2023	Mato Anomalies	Smoker, Man in Suit, Passerby	In-game credits	
2023	Master Detective Archives: Rain Code	Additional voices		
2023	Arknights	Chongyue	English dub	
2023	Detective Pikachu Returns	Charles Merloch/Deoxys	English dub	
2023	Lords of the Fallen	Andreas of Ebb		
2023	Marvel's Spider-Man 2	Additional voices		
2023	Quantum Error	Llebos, Rosegthune, Clipper		
2023	Like a Dragon Gaiden	Kazuma Kiryu	English dub; replacing Darryl Kurylo	
2023	Call of Duty: Modern Warfare III	Mike "Jabber" Yuan		
2024	Like a Dragon: Infinite Wealth	Kazuma Kiryu	English dub	
2024	Persona 3 Reload	Mamoru Hayase	English dub	
2024	Honkai: Star Rail	Dan Feng, Seafarer Mikhail	English dub	
2024	Final Fantasy VII Rebirth	Additional voices		
2024	Potionomics	Baptiste	In-game credits	
2024	Demon Slayer: Kimetsu no Yaiba – Sweep the Board	Sekido	English dub	
2025	Like a Dragon: Pirate Yakuza in Hawaii	Kazuma Kiryu	English dub	
2025	Rusty Rabbit	Stamp	Lead role; English dub	
2025	Yakuza 0 Director's Cut	Kazuma Kiryu	Lead role; English dub	
2025	The Outer Worlds 2	Zebulon Tran		
2026	Yakuza Kiwami 3 & Dark Ties	Kazuma Kiryu		
2026	Teenage Mutant Ninja Turtles: Empire City	Mashima		
2026	Grand Theft Auto VI	The Local Population		
