= List of Japanese films of 2022 =

This is a list of Japanese films released in 2022.

== Highest-grossing films ==
=== Worldwide ===
The following is a list of the top ten highest-grossing Japanese films from 2022 at the worldwide box office.

Rank	Title	Gross	Ref.
1	Suzume	$304,466,908	
2	One Piece Film: Red	$246,570,000	
3	The First Slam Dunk	$232,893,000	
4	Jujutsu Kaisen 0	$196,290,952	
5	Detective Conan: The Bride of Halloween	$92,005,000	
6	Dragon Ball Super: Super Hero	$86,562,140	
7	Kingdom 2: Far and Away	$39,240,000	
8	Shin Ultraman	$35,000,000	
9	99.9 Criminal Lawyer: The Movie	$23,000,000	
10	The Last 10 Years	$22,814,000	
10	Silent Parade	$22,814,000	

=== Japan ===
The following is a list of the top ten highest-grossing Japanese films released at the Japanese box office during 2022.

Rank	Title	Gross
1	One Piece Film: Red	¥19.70 billion ($149.81 million)
2	Jujutsu Kaisen 0	¥13.80 billion ($104.94 million)
3	Suzume	¥13.15 billion ($100 million)
4	Detective Conan: The Bride of Halloween	¥9.78 billion ($74.37 million)
5	Kingdom 2: Far and Away	¥5.16 billion ($39.24 million)
6	Shin Ultraman	¥4.44 billion ($33.76 million)
7	99.9 Criminal Lawyer: The Movie	¥3.01 billion ($22.89 million)
8	The Last 10 Years	¥3.00 billion ($22.81 million)
8	Silent Parade	¥3.00 billion ($22.81 million)
10	The Confidence Man JP: Episode of the Hero	¥2.89 billion ($21.98 million)

=== Box office records ===
- The anime films Suzume and The First Slam Dunk set several box office records.
  - In South Korea, The First Slam Dunk became the highest-grossing anime film, before its record was surpassed by Suzume.
  - In China, Suzume became the highest-grossing anime film. It also set the record for the biggest opening for an anime film in China, before its record was surpassed by The First Slam Dunk.
  - The First Slam Dunk also set Chinese box office records for the highest pre-sales for an animated import, and the largest IMAX opening weekend for a foreign animated film.

== Film releases ==
=== January–March ===
Opening		Title	Director	Cast	Ref(s)
J A N U A R Y	1	BanG Dream! Poppin' Dream!	Kōdai Kakimoto	Aimi, Sae Ōtsuka, Rimi Nishimoto, Ayaka Ōhashi, Ayasa Itō	
J A N U A R Y	7	My Brother, The Android and Me	Junji Sakamoto	Etsushi Toyokawa, Masanobu Ando, Yuki Kazamatsuri, Hirotarō Honda, Yuki Katayama, Taijirō Tamura	
J A N U A R Y	7	Truth	Yukihiko Tsutsumi	Kotoha Hiroyama, Ayano Fukumiya, Tomomi Kono	
J A N U A R Y	7	Bungo Stray Dogs The Movie: Beast	Koichi Sakamoto	Shohei Hashimoto, Yūki Torigoe, Masashi Taniguchi, Teruma, Ryōki Nagae, Kōsuke Kuwano	
J A N U A R Y	7	The Sunday Runoff	Yūichirō Sakashita	Masataka Kubota, Rie Miyazawa, Eiji Akaso, Chika Uchida, Mantaro Koichi	
J A N U A R Y	14	The Confidence Man JP: Episode of the Hero	Akira Tanaka	Masami Nagasawa, Masahiro Higashide, Fumiyo Kohinata, Shinya Kote, Yōsuke Eguchi, Nagisa Sekimizu, Risa Oda, Ryōko Hirosue	
J A N U A R Y	14	The World for Two of Us	Kashou Iizuka	Yuki Katayama, Ryota Bando, Goichi Mine, Kanako Mochida, Miyu Teshima, Miharu Tanaka	
J A N U A R Y	14	What's With That	Shinpei Yamazaki	Shirō Shimomoto, Setsuko Karasuma, Kazuma Sano, Misa Wada, Mutsuo Yoshioka, Bunmei Tobayama	
J A N U A R Y	14	Poprun	Shinichiro Ueda	Nobuji Minagawa, Hidenobu Abera, Eri Tokunaga, Harumi Shuhama, Yuka Iseki, Hideki Nagai	
J A N U A R Y	21	Missing	Shinzō Katayama	Jiro Sato, Aoi Ito, Hiroya Shimizu, Misato Morita, Shotaro Ishitadashi, Izumi Matsuoka	
J A N U A R Y	21	The Midnight Maiden War	Ken Ninomiya	Ren Nagase, Elaiza Ikeda, Tasuku Emoto, Makiko Watanabe, Yushin Shinohara, Akinori Ando	
J A N U A R Y	28	Noise	Ryūichi Hiroki	Tatsuya Fujiwara, Kenichi Matsuyama, Ryūnosuke Kamiki, Haru Kuroki, Ayumi Ito, Daichi Watanabe	
J A N U A R Y	28	Pure Japanese	Daishi Matsunaga	Dean Fujioka, Aju Makita, Tetsu Watanabe, Daichi Kaneko, Yukio Sakaguchi, Ryutaro Ninomiya	
J A N U A R Y	28	The Orbital Children	Mitsuo Iso	Natsumi Fujiwara, Azumi Waki, Kensho Ono, Chinatsu Akasaki, Yumiko Kobayashi, Mariya Ise	
J A N U A R Y	28	The Unnameable Dance	Isshin Inudo	Min Tanaka, Rin Ishihara, Tatsuya Nakamura, Otomo Yoshihide, Lajko Felix, Seigō Matsuoka	
J A N U A R Y	28	Prior Convictions	Yoshiyuki Kishi	Kasumi Arimura, Go Morita, Ryuya Wakaba, Makita Sports, Shizuka Ishibashi, Yukiya Kitamura	
J A N U A R Y	28	Kamen Rider Saber: Trio of Deep Sin	Kazuya Kamihoriuchi	Syuichiro Naito, Takaya Yamaguchi, Asuka Kawazu, Ryo Aoki, Yuki Ikushima, Eiji Togashi, Hiroaki Oka	
F E B R U A R Y	4	The Deer King	Masashi Ando, Masayuki Miyaji	Shinichi Tsutsumi, Ryoma Takeuchi, Anne Watanabe, Hisui Kimura, Yoshito Yasuhara, Toaru Sakurai	
F E B R U A R Y	4	Mr. Suzuki	Sou Sasaki	Asako Ito, Norihiko Tsukuda, Hisako Okata, Nao Yasunaga, Kai Shishido, Iwawo	
F E B R U A R Y	4	You've Got a Friend	Ryūichi Hiroki	Jun Murakami, Nahana, Masao Yoshi, Momoka Ayukawa, Shima Ohnishi, Tomu Miyazaki	
F E B R U A R Y	4	Miracle City Koza	Kazuhiro Taira	Kenta Kiritani, Yuuki Oshiro, Tsunami Ryuto, Mitsuhiro Koike, Shinichi Tsuha, Hidetoshi Kanzaki	
F E B R U A R Y	4	What to Do with the Dead Kaiju?	Satoshi Miki	Ryosuke Yamada, Tao Tsuchiya, Gaku Hamada, Hidekazu Mashima, Eri Fuse, Seiji Rokkaku, Toshihiro Yashiba, Yoshiki Arizono	
F E B R U A R Y	11	Just Remembering	Daigo Matsui	Sosuke Ikematsu, Sairi Ito, Reika Ozeki, Hiromasa Yashiki, Toshiki Hirose, Ryo Narita	
F E B R U A R Y	11	Usogui: Lie Eater	Hideo Nakata	Ryusei Yokohama, Hayato Sano, Mai Shiraishi, Shohei Miura, Kaito Sakurai, Kanata Hongō	
F E B R U A R Y	11	Homestay	Natsuki Seta	Kento Nagao, Anna Yamada, Rikako Yagi, Ayumu Mochizuki, Hidekazu Mashima, Kiyohiko Shibukawa	
F E B R U A R Y	11	Kitakaze Outsider	Tetsuhiro Sai	Tetsuhiro Sai, Maho Kasaku, Wataru Ito, Wako Ueda, Izumi Sano, Natsuko Urakawa	
F E B R U A R Y	11	Takatsu River	Yoshinari Nishikori	Masahiro Komoto, Naho Toda, Ito Ohno, Hiromasa Taguchi, Chloe Takahashi, Tomoko Naraoka	
F E B R U A R Y	18	Fruits Basket: Prelude	Yoshihide Ibata	Miyuki Sawashiro, Yoshimasa Hosoya, Manaka Iwami, Nobunaga Shimazaki, Yuma Uchida	
F E B R U A R Y	18	The Blue Skies at Your Feet	Yuki Saito	Riko Fukumoto, Genta Matsuda, Mizuki Itagaki, Mayuu Yokota, Riko, Toshihiro Yashiba	
F E B R U A R Y	18	Ox-Head Village	Takashi Shimizu	Kōki, Riku Hagiwara, Fumiya Takahashi, Haruka Imo, Rinka Otani, Riko	
F E B R U A R Y	18	Goodbye, Don Glees!	Atsuko Ishizuka	Natsuki Hanae, Yuki Kaji, Ayumu Murase, Kana Hanazawa, Rino Sashihara, Atsushi Tamura	
F E B R U A R Y	18	Residents of Evil	Katusmi Sasaki	Kokoro Ebino, Kento Ono	
F E B R U A R Y	25	Love Nonetheless	Hideo Jojo	Kōji Seto, Honami Satō, Yuumi Kawai, Ayumu Nakajima, Yuka Kouri	
F E B R U A R Y	25	Deemo: Memorial Keys	Shūhei Matsushita, Junichi Fujisaku	Ayana Taketatsu, Naomi Watanabe, Gaku Hamada, Issey Ogata, Kouhei Matsushita, Kōichi Yamadera	
F E B R U A R Y	25	Ribbon	Non	Non, Rio Yamashita, Daichi Watanabe, Karin Ono, Misayo Haruki, Daikichi Sugawara	
F E B R U A R Y	25	Ring Wandering	Masakazu Kaneko	Show Kasamatsu, Junko Abe, Reiko Kataoka, Toru Shinagawa, Ken Yasuda, Yōji Tanaka	
F E B R U A R Y	25	Haiiro no Kabe	Kozo Ando	So Okuno, Ayaka Konno, Takanori Jinnai	
M A R C H	4	Doraemon: Nobita's Little Star Wars 2021	Susumu Yamaguchi	Wasabi Mizuta, Megumi Ohara, Yumi Kakazu, Subaru Kimura, Tomokazu Seki, Romi Park	
M A R C H	4	Ensemble Stars!! Road to Show!!	Asami Nakatani, Masakazu Hishida	Showtaro Morikubo, Yuki Kaji, Kōhei Amasaki, Chiharu Shigematsu, Junichi Suwabe, Soma Saito	
M A R C H	4	The Last 10 Years	Michihito Fujii	Nana Komatsu, Kentaro Sakaguchi, Yuki Yamada, Nao, Satoru Iguchi, Haru Kuroki, Hideko Hara, Yutaka Matsushige	
M A R C H	4	Ashiya's School Lunch	Mitsuhito Shiraha	Ruka Matsuda, Takuya Ishida, Takashi Nishina, Mao Miyaji, Izumi Fujimoto, Rintaro Kurita	
M A R C H	4	Blue Thermal	Masaki Tachibana	Mayu Hotta, Nobunaga Shimazaki, Junya Enoki, Mikako Komatsu, Daisuke Ono, Haruka Shiraishi	
M A R C H	4	The Legend of the Galactic Heroes: Die Neue These Gekitotsu	Shunsuke Tada	Mamoru Miyano, Kenichi Suzumura, Yuki Kaji, Daisuke Ono, Yuichi Nakamura, Tokuyoshi Kawashima	
M A R C H	11	Wedding High	Akiko Ōku	Ryōko Shinohara, Tomoya Nakamura, Nagisa Sekimizu, Takanori Iwata, Osamu Mukai, Katsumi Takahashi	
M A R C H	11	Intimate Stranger	Mayu Nakamura	Asuka Kurosawa, Fuju Kamio, Yu Uemura, Shogen, Shirō Sano, Mitsuko Oka	
M A R C H	11	Moonlight Diner	Kōji Kamui	Rei Sugai, Miko Nakagawa, Mitsunari Sakamoto, Chiaki Hiratsuka, Hiroyuki Hagita, Takafumi Kagaya	
M A R C H	12	Kamen Rider OOO 10th: Core Medal of Resurrection	Ryuta Tasaki	Shu Watanabe, Shingo Izumi, Riho Takada, Hiroaki Iwanaga, Asaya Kimijima, Mayuko Arisue, Marie Kai	
M A R C H	18	Straying	Rikiya Imaizumi	Nairu Yamamoto, Katsuya Maiguma, Miyū Teshima, Kai Inowaki	
M A R C H	18	Kappei	Takashi Hirano	Hideaki Itō, Moka Kamishiraishi, Daigo Nishihata, Yusuke Onuki, Arata Furuta, Koji Yamamoto	
M A R C H	18	Ultraman Trigger: Episode Z	Masayoshi Takesue	Raiga Terasaka, Runa Toyoda, Shunya Kaneko, Tadashi Mizuno, Meiku Harukawa, Katsuya Takagi, Kei Hosogai, Shin Takuma, Kohshu Hirano, Yuichi Nakamura, Akinori Ando	
M A R C H	25	Two Outs Bases Loaded	Hirokazu Fujisawa	Aran Abe, Mizuki Itagaki, Haruka Kudō, Shoki Moroboshi, Ryūhei Watabe, Tamiyasu Cho	
M A R C H	25	Love Like the Falling Petals	Yoshihiro Fukagawa	Kento Nakajima, Honoka Matsumoto, Kento Nagayama, Yuki Sakurai, Shuntaro Yanagi, Yumi Wakatsuki	
M A R C H	25	Mr. Osomatsu	Tsutomu Hanabusa	Koji Mukai, Hikaru Iwamoto, Ren Meguro, Tatsuya Fukazawa, Raul, Daisuke Sakuma	

=== April–June ===
Opening		Title	Director	Cast	Ref(s)
A P R I L	1	Odd Taxi: In the Woods	Baku Kinoshita	Natsuki Hanae, Riho Iida, Ryōhei Kimura, Kappei Yamaguchi, Suzuko Mimori, Moeka Koizumi	
A P R I L	1	One Day, You Will Reach the Sea	Ryutaro Nakagawa	Yukino Kishii, Minami Hamabe, Yosuke Sugino, Haya Nakazaki, Mayu Tsuruta, Tomoko Nakajima	
A P R I L	1	To Be Killed by a High School Girl	Hideo Jojo	Kei Tanaka, Sara Minami, Yuumi Kawai, Riko, Mizuki Kayashima, Kanata Hosoda, Yuko Oshima	
A P R I L	1	Life in Bloom	Nobuyuki Miyake	Renka Iwamoto, Akira Takarada, Tomohiro Kaku, Shin Namura, Rumi Hiiragi, Yumiko Ito	
A P R I L	8	Tozai Johnny's Jr.: Our Survival Wars!	Taisuke Kawamura	Hideo Yasushima, Sota Uchimura, Kohei Aoki, Yojiro Taki, Seiki Kawasaki, Toa Shimazaki	
A P R I L	8	Cherry Magic! the Movie	Hiroki Kazama	Eiji Akaso, Keita Machida, Yutaro, Takuya Kusakawa, Ryo Sato, Nosuke Suzu	
A P R I L	8	Tombi: Father and Son	Takahisa Zeze	Hiroshi Abe, Takumi Kitamura, Anne Watanabe, Ken Yasuda, Gaku Hamada, Takashi Ukaji	
A P R I L	8	Once Hit the Bottom	Kenji Shibayama	Tetsuji Tamayama, Takuma Otoo, Mai Fukagawa, Yasuda Dancho, Kazuya Takahashi, Kazuko Kato	
A P R I L	8	The Three Young-Men in Midnight: The Movie	Takeshi Moriya	Ryuta Sato, Yoshinori Okada, Takashi Tsukamoto, Daisuke Kobayashi, Nashiko Momotsuki, Tamae Ando	
A P R I L	15	Detective Conan: The Bride of Halloween	Susumu Mitsunaka	Minami Takayama, Wakana Yamazaki, Rikiya Koyama, Tōru Furuya	
A P R I L	22	Crayon Shinchan the Movie: The Tornado Legend of Ninja Mononoke	Masakazu Hashimoto	Yumiko Kobayashi, Miki Narahashi, Toshiyuki Morikawa, Satomi Kōrogi	
A P R I L	29	Re:cycle of Penguindrum	Kunihiko Ikuhara	Ryōhei Kimura, Subaru Kimura, Miho Arakawa, Marie Miyake, Mamiko Noto, Yui Horie	
A P R I L	29	xxxHolic	Mika Ninagawa	Ryūnosuke Kamiki, Ko Shibasaki, Hokuto Matsumura, Tina Tamashiro	
A P R I L	29	Tsuyukusa	Hideyuki Hirayama	Satomi Kobayashi, Shitaka Saito, Yutaka Matsushige	
A P R I L	29	Radiation House: The Movie	Masayuki Suzuki	Masataka Kubota, Tsubasa Honda, Alice Hirose	
A P R I L	29	Bldg. N	Yōsuke Gotō	Minori Hagiwara, Kasumi Yamaya, Yūki Kura, Mariko Tsutsui	
A P R I L	29	Kikai Sentai Zenkaiger vs. Kiramager vs. Senpaiger	Kyohei Yamaguchi	Kiita Komagine, Shintarō Asanuma, Yuki Kaji, Yume Miyamoto, Takuya Sato, Atsuki Mashiko, Rio Komiya, Rui Kihara, Yume Shinjo, Atomu Mizuishi, Mio Kudo, Ryota Ozawa	
M A Y	6	Lesson in Murder	Kazuya Shiraishi	Sadao Abe, Kenshi Okada, Takanori Iwata, Miho Nakayama	
M A Y	6	My Small Land	Emma Kawawada	Lina Arashi, Daiken Okudaira, Hanae Kan	
M A Y	13	Bubble	Tetsurō Araki	Jun Shison, Mamoru Miyano, Yuki Kaji, Tasuku Hatanaka	
M A Y	13	Shin Ultraman	Shinji Higuchi	Takumi Saitoh, Masami Nagasawa, Hidetoshi Nishijima, Daiki Arioka, Akari Hayami, Tetsushi Tanaka, Koji Yamamoto	
M A Y	13	Wandering	Lee Sang-il	Suzu Hirose, Tori Matsuzaka, Ryusei Yokohama, Mikako Tabe	
M A Y	13	Drive into Night	Dai Sakō	Tomomitsu Adachi, Reo Tamaoki, Nahana, Yutaka Matsushige	
M A Y	13	School Meals Time: Graduation	Shinya Ayabe	Hayato Ichihara, Kaho Tsuchimura, Taishi Sato, Yuhi, Maiko Itō, Kiichi Naoe, Hana Kino, Toshiya Sakai	
M A Y	20	Dreaming of the Meridian Arc	Kenji Nakanishi	Kiichi Nakai, Kenichi Matsuyama, Keiko Kitagawa	
M A Y	20	The Quintessential Quintuplets Movie	Masato Jinbo	Yoshitsugu Matsuoka, Kana Hanazawa, Ayana Taketatsu, Miku Itō, Ayane Sakura, Inori Minase	
M A Y	20	Fullmetal Alchemist: The Revenge of Scar	Fumihiko Sori	Ryosuke Yamada, Tsubasa Honda, Dean Fujioka, Mackenyu	
M A Y	20	Anime Supremacy!	Kōhei Yoshino	Riho Yoshioka, Tomoya Nakamura, Tasuku Emoto, Machiko Ono	
M A Y	27	Soul at Twenty	Jun Akiyama	Fūju Kamio, Kōichi Satō, Riko Fukumoto, Masaya Sano, Koki Maeda, Jay Wakabayashi	
M A Y	27	Inu-Oh	Masaaki Yuasa	Avu-chan, Mirai Moriyama, Tasuku Emoto, Kenjiro Tsuda, Yutaka Matsushige, Kuroemon Katayama	
J U N E	3	Mobile Suit Gundam: Cucuruz Doan's Island	Yoshikazu Yasuhiko	Tōru Furuya, Shunsuke Takeuchi, Ken Narita, Satomi Arai, Megumi Han, Toshio Furukawa	
J U N E	3	Sun and Bolero	Yutaka Mizutani	Rei Dan, Kanji Ishimaru, Maria Mori, Keita Machida, Yutaka Mizutani, Tasuku Nagaoka	
J U N E	3	A Winter Rose	Junji Sakamoto	Kentarō Itō, Kaoru Kobayashi, Kimiko Yo	
J U N E	3	Tokyo 2020 Official Film Series	Naomi Kawase	Various	
J U N E	3	Kisaragi Station	Jirō Nagae	Yuri Tsunematsu, Eriko Sato, Miyu Honda, Riko	
J U N E	3	The Way of the Househusband: The Movie	Tōichirō Rutō	Hiroshi Tamaki, Haruna Kawaguchi, Jun Shison, Tina Tamashiro	
J U N E	10	Alivehoon	Ten Shimoyama	Shūhei Nomura, Ai Yoshikawa, Takanori Jinnai, Shodai Fukuyama, Hirotarō Honda, Moro Morooka	
J U N E	10	Grown-ups	Takuya Katō	Mai Kiryū, Kisetsu Fujiwara, Rio Kanno, Kurumi Shimizu, Kokoro Morita, Dori Sakurada	
J U N E	10	Isekai Quartet: The Movie – Another World	Minoru Ashina	Satoshi Hino, Jun Fukushima, Yūsuke Kobayashi, Aoi Yūki, Kaito Ishikawa, Minami Tanaka, Tomoyuki Morikawa, Nana Mizuki	
J U N E	10	Teasing Master Takagi-san: The Movie	Hiroaki Akagi	Rie Takahashi, Yuki Kaji, Konomi Kohara, Mao Ichimichi, Yui Ogura, Fukushi Ochiai	
J U N E	10	Yes, I Can't Swim	Kensaku Watanabe	Hiroki Hasegawa, Haruka Ayase, Hiroko Isayama, Yuriko Hirooka, Fusako Urabe, Nami Uehara	
J U N E	11	Dragon Ball Super: Super Hero	Tetsuro Kodama	Masako Nozawa, Toshio Furukawa, Yūko Minaguchi, Ryō Horikawa, Mayumi Tanaka	
J U N E	17	The Hound of the Baskervilles: Sherlock the Movie	Hiroshi Nishitani	Dean Fujioka, Takanori Iwata, Yuko Araki, Ryōko Hirosue, Nijirō Murakami, Kiyohiko Shibukawa	
J U N E	17	Love Is Light	Keiichi Kobayashi	Fūju Kamio, Nanase Nishino, Yuna Taira, Fumika Baba	
J U N E	17	BL Metamorphosis	Shunsuke Kariyama	Nobuko Miyamoto, Mana Ashida, Kyōhei Takahashi, Kotone Furukawa, Tomoko Ikuta, Ken Mitsuishi	
J U N E	17	The Pass: Last Days of the Samurai	Takashi Koizumi	Kōji Yakusho, Takako Matsu, Kyōko Kagawa, Min Tanaka, Tatsuya Nakadai, Kento Nagayama, Kyoko Yoshine, Ryota Bando, Masahiro Higashide	
J U N E	17	Plan 75	Chie Hayakawa	Chieko Baisho, Hayato Isomura, Taka Takao, Yuumi Kawai, Stefanie Arianne, Hisako Ogata	
J U N E	17	Yokai Housemate: Is He Prince Charming?	Keisuke Toyoshima	Fuka Koshiba, Marika Matsumoto, Katsuya Maiguma, Nobue Iketani, Koji Okura	
J U N E	24	Fullmetal Alchemist: The Final Alchemy	Fumihiko Sori	Ryosuke Yamada, Tsubasa Honda, Dean Fujioka, Mackenyu, Seiyō Uchino	

=== July–September ===
Opening		Title	Director	Cast	Ref(s)
J U L Y	1	Laid-Back Camp Movie	Yoshiaki Kyōgoku	Yumiri Hanamori, Nao Tōyama, Sayuri Hara, Aki Toyosaki, Rie Takahashi	
J U L Y	8	The Broken Commandment	Kazuo Maeda	Shotaro Mamiya, Anna Ishii, Yūma Yamoto, Kazuya Takahashi, Ayako Kobayashi, Kou Nanase	
J U L Y	8	My Boyfriend in Orange	Shōsuke Murakami	Hikaru Iwamoto, Meru Nukumi, Jin Suzuki, Shuhei Uesugi, Hidaka Ukisho, Yūta Furukawa	
J U L Y	8	This Is Amiko	Yūsuke Morii	Kana Ōsawa, Arata Iura, Machiko Ono	
J U L Y	8	Believers	Hideo Jojo	Hayato Isomura, Yui Kitamura, Shohei Uno, Katsuya Maiguma, Naoki Yamamoto	
J U L Y	8	Tell Me	Renpei Tsukamoto	Tsubasa Imai, Takashi Tsukamoto, Juon, Kenjiro Tsuda	
J U L Y	15	Kingdom 2: Far and Away	Shinsuke Sato	Kento Yamazaki, Ryo Yoshizawa, Kanna Hashimoto, Nana Seino, Amane Okayama, Takahiro Miura, Takayuki Hamatsu, Kiyohiko Shibukawa, Yukiyoshi Ozawa, Hiroshi Tamaki, Kōichi Satō, Etsushi Toyokawa, Takao Osawa	
J U L Y	22	Ghost Book	Takashi Yamazaki	Kairi Jō, Fūga Shibazaki, Ayaka Yoshimura, Sonny McClendon, Ryūnosuke Kamiki, Yui Aragaki	
J U L Y	22	Shimamori	Shō Igarashi	Masato Hagiwara, Jun Murakami, Riho Yoshioka, Kyōko Kagawa	
J U L Y	22	Avataro Sentai Donbrothers The Movie: Shin Hatsukoi Hero	Ryuta Tasaki	Kohei Higuchi, Yuuki Beppu, Kohaku Shida, Totaro, Hirofumi Suzuki, Raizou Ishikawa, Yuya Tominaga, Amisa Miyazaki, Shinnosuke Takahashi, Kiita Komagine	
J U L Y	22	Kamen Rider Revice: Battle Familia	Koichi Sakamoto	Kentaro Maeda, Subaru Kimura, Wataru Hyuga, Ayaka Imoto, Miku Itō, Noritaka Hamao, Junya Komatsu, Yui Asakura, Kurodo Hachijoin, Hayata Seki, Jun Hashimoto, Kurara Emi, Shigeyuki Totsugi, Shingo Fujimori	
J U L Y	29	Even If This Love Disappears From the World Tonight	Takahiro Miki	Shunsuke Michieda, Riko Fukumoto, Kotone Furukawa, Koki Maeda, Nishigaki Takumi, Honoka Matsumoto	
A U G U S T	5	Convenience Story	Satoshi Miki	Ryo Narita, Atsuko Maeda, Seiji Rokkaku, Yuki Katayama	
A U G U S T	6	One Piece Film: Red	Gorō Taniguchi	Mayumi Tanaka, Kaori Nazuka, Ado, Shūichi Ikeda, Kazuya Nakai, Akemi Okamura, Kappei Yamaguchi, Hiroaki Hirata, Ikue Ōtani	
A U G U S T	11	Tang and Me	Takahiro Miki	Kazunari Ninomiya, Hikari Mitsushima, Mikako Ichikawa, Tetsuya Takeda, Nao, Taiga Kyomoto	
A U G U S T	11	It's All My Fault	Yūsaku Matsumoto	Haruto Shiratori, Ririka Kawashima, Joe Odagiri	
A U G U S T	19	Nagi's Island	Masahiko Nagasawa	Chise Niitsu, Haruka Shimazaki, Kousei Yuki, Rosa Kato, Yoshimi Tokui, Kyusaku Shimada, Hana Kino	
A U G U S T	19	Haw	Isshin Inudo	Kei Tanaka, Elaiza Ikeda, Renji Ishibashi, Nobuko Miyamoto	
A U G U S T	19	Violence Action	Tōichirō Rutō	Kanna Hashimoto, Yosuke Sugino, Ouji Suzuka, Fumika Baba, Win Morisaki, Shunsuke Daito	
A U G U S T	19	Tsurune: The Movie – The First Shot	Takuya Yamamura	Yūto Uemura, Shintarō Asanuma, Aoi Ichikawa, Ryōta Suzuki, Shogo Yano, Kaito Ishikawa, Kensho Ono	
A U G U S T	26	Akira and Akira	Takahiro Miki	Ryoma Takeuchi, Ryusei Yokohama, Kaito Takahashi, Moka Kamishiraishi, Eiji Okuda, Yōsuke Eguchi	
A U G U S T	26	Offbeat Cops	Eiji Uchida	Hiroshi Abe, Nana Seino, Hayato Isomura, Mahiro Takasugi, Mitsuko Baisho	
S E P T E M B E R	1	The Good Father	Shō Kataoka	Sara Minami, Hiroshi Tamaki, Ryūsei Ōnishi, Yuki Sakurai	
S E P T E M B E R	1	The Fish Tale	Shūichi Okita	Non, Yuya Yagira, Kaho, Hayato Isomura, Amane Okayama, Hiroki Miyake, Haruka Igawa	
S E P T E M B E R	2	Tyida	Yūji Nakamae	Fumika Baba, Shizuka Nakamura, Kouhei Takeda	
S E P T E M B E R	9	A Hundred Flowers	Genki Kawamura	Masaki Suda, Mieko Harada, Masami Nagasawa, Masatoshi Nagase	
S E P T E M B E R	9	The Tunnel to Summer, the Exit of Goodbyes	Tomohisa Taguchi	Ouji Suzuka, Marie Iitoyo, Tasuku Hatanaka, Arisa Komiya	
S E P T E M B E R	9	Love Life	Kōji Fukada	Fumino Kimura, Kento Nagayama, Atom Sunada, Hirona Yamazaki	
S E P T E M B E R	9	Goodbye Cruel World	Tatsushi Ōmori	Hidetoshi Nishijima, Takumi Saitoh, Hio Miyazawa, Tina Tamashiro, Tomokazu Miura	
S E P T E M B E R	16	Silent Parade	Hiroshi Nishitani	Masaharu Fukuyama, Ko Shibasaki, Kazuki Kitamura, Kippei Shiina, Rei Dan, Jun Murakami, Kazuki Iio, Naho Toda, Asuka Kawatoko, Natsuki Deguchi	
S E P T E M B E R	16	Hell Dogs	Masato Harada	Junichi Okada, Kentaro Sakaguchi, Mayu Matsuoka, Miyavi, Yoshi Sakou, Mitsuo Yoshihara, Kazuki Kitamura, Shinobu Otake	
S E P T E M B E R	16	The Nighthawk's First Love	Yuka Yasukawa	Rena Matsui, Ayumu Nakajima	
S E P T E M B E R	16	Drifting Home	Hiroyasu Ishida	Mutsumi Tamura, Asami Seto, Ayumu Murase, Daiki Yamashita, Yumiko Kobayashi, Inori Minase	
S E P T E M B E R	16	Riverside Mukolitta	Naoko Ogigami	Kenichi Matsuyama, Tsuyoshi Muro, Hidetaka Yoshioka, Hikari Mitsushima	
S E P T E M B E R	16	Hand	Daigo Matsui	Akari Fukunaga, Daichi Kaneko	
S E P T E M B E R	23	Everything Will Be Owlright!	Masahide Ichii	Shingo Katori, Yukino Kishii, Kai Inowaki, Koji Matoba, Hidekazu Mashima, Kimiko Yo	
S E P T E M B E R	23	Delicious Party Precure: Yumemiru Okosama Lunch	Akifumi Zako	Hana Hishikawa, Risa Shimizu, Yuka Iguchi, Ai Kayano, Natsumi Takamori, Natsumi Hioka, Tomoe Hanba, Tomoaki Maeno, Yūma Uchida	
S E P T E M B E R	30	It's in the Woods	Hideo Nakata	Masaki Aiba, Honoka Matsumoto, Kenshin Uehara, Noriko Eguchi, Fumiyo Kohinata	
S E P T E M B E R	30	I Am Makimoto	Nobuo Mizuta	Sadao Abe, Hikari Mitsushima, Jun Kunimura	
S E P T E M B E R	30	My Broken Mariko	Yuki Tanada	Mei Nagano, Nao, Masataka Kubota, Toshinori Omi, Yō Yoshida	
S E P T E M B E R	30	Safe Word	Kōji Shiraishi	Chisako Kawase, Nagisa Toriumi	

=== October–December ===
Opening		Title	Director	Cast	Ref(s)
O C T O B E R	7	7 Secretaries: The Movie	Naoki Tamura	Fumino Kimura, Alice Hirose, Nanao, Shim Eun-kyung, Yuko Oshima, Shigeru Muroi, Yōsuke Eguchi	
O C T O B E R	7	The Mukoda Barber Shop	Toshiyuki Morioka	Katsumi Takahashi, Jin Shirasu, Yasuko Tomita	
O C T O B E R	7	Thousand and One Nights	Nao Kubota	Yūko Tanaka, Machiko Ono, Masanobu Ando	
O C T O B E R	7	To Every You I've Loved Before	Jun Matsumoto	Hio Miyazawa, Ai Hashimoto, Aju Makita, Tokuma Nishioka, Kimiko Yo	
O C T O B E R	7	To Me, the One Who Loved You	Ken'ichi Kasai	Hio Miyazawa, Aju Makita, Ai Hashimoto, Tokuma Nishioka, Kimiko Yo	
O C T O B E R	8	No Place to Go	Banmei Takahashi	Yuka Itaya, Ayaka Ōnishi, Takahiro Miura, Akira Emoto, Tasuku Emoto	
O C T O B E R	14	Whisper of the Heart	Yūichirō Hirakawa	Nana Seino, Tori Matsuzaka, Runa Yasuhara, Tsubasa Nakagawa	
O C T O B E R	14	Re/Member	Eiichirō Hasumi	Kanna Hashimoto, Gordon Maeda, Maika Yamamoto, Fūju Kamio, Kotaro Daigo, Mayuu Yokota	
O C T O B E R	14	How to Find Happiness	Shunichi Nagasaki	Mahiro Takasugi, Nagisa Sekimizu, Renji Ishibashi, Ai Serikawa	
O C T O B E R	14	To the Supreme!	Santa Yamagishi	Atsuko Maeda, Fuma Kikuchi, Marika Itō, Reiji Okamoto, Mei Kurokawa, Takahiro Miura, Shuri, Yudai Chiba	
O C T O B E R	14	Mondays: See You "This" Week!	Ryō Takebayashi	Wan Marui, Makita Sports, Kōki Osamura, Yūgo Mikawa, Harumi Shuhama	
O C T O B E R	14	When the Rain Falls	Shusuke Kaneko	Kazuha Komiya, Kazumi	
O C T O B E R	21	The Lines That Define Me	Norihiro Koizumi	Ryusei Yokohama, Kaya Kiyohara, Tomokazu Miura, Yōsuke Eguchi, Kanata Hosoda	
O C T O B E R	21	Break in the Clouds	Kazuyoshi Ozawa	Haruka Kodama, Tsumugi, Eriko Sato, Hitoshi Ozawa	
O C T O B E R	21	Break of Dawn	Tomoyuki Kurokawa	Hana Sugisaki, Aoi Yūki, Natsumi Fujiwara, Nobuhiko Okamoto, Inori Minase, Haruka Tomatsu	
O C T O B E R	28	The Three Sisters of Tenmasou Inn	Ryuhei Kitamura	Non, Mugi Kadowaki, Yuko Oshima, Ko Shibasaki, Shinobu Terajima, Kengo Kora	
O C T O B E R	28	A Turtle's Shell Is a Human's Ribs	Masa Mori	Hiroya Shimizu, Hayato Isomura, Takuya Eguchi, Moe Kamikokuryo	
O C T O B E R	28	Halloween Party	Kentarō Hachisuka	Yuzuna Katō, Keiko Matsuzaka, Hiyuka Sakagawa	
O C T O B E R	28	Sadako DX	Hisashi Kimura	Fuka Koshiba, Kazuma Kawamura, Mario Kuroba, Hiroyuki Ikeuchi	
N O V E M B E R	4	By the Window	Rikiya Imaizumi	Goro Inagaki, Yuri Nakamura, Tina Tamashiro, Ryuya Wakaba, Mirai Shida, Shion Sasaki	
N O V E M B E R	4	The Setting Sun	Akio Kondō	Mayu Miyamoto, Masanobu Ando, Maki Mizuno	
N O V E M B E R	4	A Mother's Touch	Junpei Matsumoto	Koyuki, Taketo Tanaka, Hisashi Yoshizawa, Lily Franky	
N O V E M B E R	11	Suzume	Makoto Shinkai	Nanoka Hara, Hokuto Matsumura, Eri Fukatsu, Shota Sometani, Sairi Ito, Kotone Hanase, Kana Hanazawa, Matsumoto Hakuō II	
N O V E M B E R	11	The Zen Diary	Yuji Nakae	Kenji Sawada, Takako Matsu, Naomi Nishida, Tomoko Naraoka, Shōhei Hino	
N O V E M B E R	11	A Girl in My Room	Natsuki Takahashi	Shiori Kubo, Riku Hagiwara	
N O V E M B E R	11	Remember to Breathe	Shin'ichi Sugita	Mao Inoue, Eri Ishida, Junko Abe, Show Kasamatsu, Shōhei Uno	
N O V E M B E R	11	2 Women	Ryūichi Hiroki	Shinobu Terajima, Etsushi Toyokawa, Ryōko Hirosue	
N O V E M B E R	18	Roleless	Gogatsu	Teruyuki Kagawa, Kanji Tsuda, Toshinori Omi, Noriko Nakagoshi	
N O V E M B E R	18	A Man	Kei Ishikawa	Satoshi Tsumabuki, Sakura Ando, Masataka Kubota, Nana Seino, Taiga Nakano, Yōko Maki, Akira Emoto	
N O V E M B E R	23	Motherhood	Ryūichi Hiroki	Erika Toda, Mei Nagano, Mao Daichi, Atsuko Takahata, Masaki Miura	
N O V E M B E R	25	That Time I Got Reincarnated as a Slime the Movie: Scarlet Bond	Yasuhito Kikuchi	Miho Okasaki, Yuma Uchida, Riko Fukumoto, Makoto Furukawa, Megumi Toyoguchi, Tomoaki Maeno, Sayaka Senbongi, M・A・O, Takuya Eguchi, Hōchū Ōtsuka, Junichi Yanagita, Kanehira Yamamoto, Asuna Tomari, Chikahiro Kobayashi, Taro Yamaguchi, Jun Fukushima, Takahiro Sakurai, Subaru Kimura	
D E C E M B E R	2	Phases of the Moon	Ryūichi Hiroki	Yo Oizumi, Kasumi Arimura, Ren Meguro, Ko Shibasaki, Kei Tanaka, Sairi Ito, Hinako Kikuchi	
D E C E M B E R	3	The First Slam Dunk	Takehiko Inoue	Shugo Nakamura, Jun Kasama, Shin'ichirō Kamio, Subaru Kimura, Kenta Miyake	
D E C E M B E R	9	Fragments of the Last Will	Takahisa Zeze	Kazunari Ninomiya, Keiko Kitagawa, Tori Matsuzaka, Kento Nakajima, Kenta Kiritani, Ken Yasuda	
D E C E M B E R	9	Nighttime Warbles	Hideo Jojo	Yuki Yamada, Marika Matsumoto	
D E C E M B E R	9	The Flower in the Sky	Ikki Katashima	Masahiro Higashide, Noriko Iriyama, Mitsuru Fukikoshi	
D E C E M B E R	16	Dr. Coto's Clinic 2022	Isamu Nakae	Hidetaka Yoshioka, Ko Shibasaki, Saburō Tokitō, Nene Otsuka, Kaito Takahashi, Erika Ikuta, Nao Ōmori, Shigeru Izumiya, Toshio Kakei, Kaoru Kobayashi	
D E C E M B E R	16	I Am What I Am	Shin'ya Tamada	Tōko Miura, Atsuko Maeda, Marika Itō, Kuu Izima, Hiroki Miyake	
D E C E M B E R	16	Small, Slow But Steady	Sho Miyake	Yukino Kishii, Tomokazu Miura	
D E C E M B E R	16	Old School	Kōtarō Ikawa	Yukiya Kitamura, Yōhei Matsukado, Iriya Take, Yuzu Aoki	
D E C E M B E R	23	Black Night Parade	Yuichi Fukuda	Ryo Yoshizawa, Kanna Hashimoto, Taishi Nakagawa, Keisuke Watanabe, Hiroshi Tamaki	
D E C E M B E R	23	Kamen Rider Geats × Revice: Movie Battle Royale	Takayuki Shibasaki	Kentaro Maeda, Subaru Kimura, Hideyoshi Kan	
D E C E M B E R	23	Lonely Castle in the Mirror	Keiichi Hara	Ami Touma, Takumi Kitamura, Sakura Kiryu, Rihito Itagaki, Mana Ashida, Aoi Miyazaki	
D E C E M B E R	24	Amnesiac Love	Wataru Hiranami	Shunsuke Tanaka, Kasumi Yamaya, Masato Hagiwara, Reiko Kataoka, Min Tanaka	
D E C E M B E R	30	Ginji the Speculator	Ryūichi Mino	Yū Uemura, Yūki Morinaga, Toshio Kakei, Sei Matobu	

== See also ==
- List of 2022 box office number-one films in Japan
- 2022 in Japan
- 2022 in Japanese television
