= List of 2022 box office number-one films in Japan =

The following is a list of 2022 box office number-one films in Japan by week. When the number-one film in gross is not the same as the number-one film in admissions, both are listed.

== Number-one films ==
†	This implies the highest-grossing movie of the year.

Week #	Date	Film	Gross	Notes
1	January 2, 2022	Jujutsu Kaisen 0	US$5,357,600	
2	January 9, 2022	Spider-Man: No Way Home	US$7,843,100	
3	January 16, 2022	The Confidence Man JP: Episode of the Hero	US$4,115,700	
4	January 23, 2022	Jujutsu Kaisen 0	US$3,594,400	
5	January 30, 2022	Jujutsu Kaisen 0	US$2,070,500	
6	February 6, 2022	Jujutsu Kaisen 0	US$3,632,800	
7	February 13, 2022	Jujutsu Kaisen 0	US$1,958,400	
8	February 20, 2022	Jujutsu Kaisen 0	US$2,922,400	
9	February 27, 2022	Jujutsu Kaisen 0	US$1,592,600	
10	March 6, 2022	Doraemon: Nobita's Little Star Wars 2021	US$3,425,200	
11	March 13, 2022	Doraemon: Nobita's Little Star Wars 2021	US$2,386,700	
12	March 20, 2022	Sing 2	US$3,677,800	
13	March 27, 2022	Sing 2	US$2,539,500	
14	April 3, 2022	Sing 2	US$2,062,100	
15	April 10, 2022	Fantastic Beasts: The Secrets of Dumbledore	US$6,268,400	
16	April 17, 2022	Detective Conan: The Bride of Halloween	US$10,941,100	
17	April 24, 2022	Detective Conan: The Bride of Halloween	US$6,978,200	
18	May 1, 2022	Detective Conan: The Bride of Halloween	US$5,647,600	
19	May 8, 2022	Detective Conan: The Bride of Halloween	US$3,026,200	
20	May 15, 2022	Shin Ultraman	US$5,454,500	
21	May 22, 2022	Shin Ultraman	US$3,808,100	
22	May 29, 2022	Top Gun: Maverick	US$6,482,800	
23	June 5, 2022	Top Gun: Maverick	US$5,798,600	
24	June 12, 2022	Dragon Ball Super: Super Hero	US$4,979,500	
25	June 19, 2022	Top Gun: Maverick	US$4,410,200	
26	June 26, 2022	Top Gun: Maverick	US$3,737,200	
27	July 3, 2022	Top Gun: Maverick	US$2,889,000	
28	July 10, 2022	Thor: Love and Thunder	US$2,834,100	
29	July 17, 2022	Kingdom 2: Far and Away	US$5,780,700	
30	July 24, 2022	Kingdom 2: Far and Away	US$3,042,500	
31	July 31, 2022	Jurassic World Dominion	US$7,098,700	
32	August 7, 2022	One Piece Film: Red †	US$16,658,500	
33	August 14, 2022	One Piece Film: Red †	US$11,229,600	
34	August 21, 2022	One Piece Film: Red †	US$5,968,700	
35	August 28, 2022	One Piece Film: Red †	US$8,709,000	
36	September 4, 2022	One Piece Film: Red †	US$4,965,900	
37	September 11, 2022	One Piece Film: Red †	US$3,454,800	
38	September 18, 2022	One Piece Film: Red †	US$4,051,800	
39	September 25, 2022	One Piece Film: Red †	US$2,488,000	
40	October 2, 2022	One Piece Film: Red †	US$2,358,000	
41	October 9, 2022	One Piece Film: Red †	US$1,579,600	
42	October 16, 2022	One Piece Film: Red †	US$1,567,600	
43	October 23, 2022	Sword Art Online Progressive: Scherzo of Deep Night	US$2,165,800	
44	October 30, 2022	One Piece Film: Red †	US$2,056,300	
45	November 6, 2022	One Piece Film: Red †	US$834,900	
46	November 13, 2022	Suzume	US$9,955,200	
47	November 20, 2022	Suzume	US$8,147,500	
48	November 27, 2022	Suzume	US$6,106,400	
49	December 4, 2022	The First Slam Dunk	US$9,610,000	
50	December 11, 2022	The First Slam Dunk	US$6,029,900	
51	December 18, 2022	The First Slam Dunk	US$4,019,900	
52	December 25, 2022	The First Slam Dunk	US$3,482,000	
53	January 1, 2023	The First Slam Dunk	US$2,770,600	

== Highest-grossing films ==
International film Japanese film

Highest-grossing films in 2022.
Rank	Title	Gross
1	One Piece Film: Red	¥19.70 billion ($149.81 million) (Note: Excluding the gross from subsequent re-releases.)
2	Jujutsu Kaisen 0	¥13.80 billion ($104.94 million)
3	Top Gun: Maverick	¥13.57 billion ($103.2 million)
4	Suzume	¥13.15 billion ($100 million)
5	Detective Conan: The Bride of Halloween	¥9.78 billion ($74.37 million)
6	Jurassic World Dominion	¥6.32 billion ($48.06 million)
7	Kingdom 2: Far and Away	¥5.16 billion ($39.24 million)
8	Fantastic Beasts: The Secrets of Dumbledore	¥4.60 billion ($34.98 million)
9	Shin Ultraman	¥4.44 billion ($33.76 million)
9	Minions: The Rise of Gru	¥4.44 billion ($33.76 million)

== See also ==
- List of Japanese films of 2022
