= One Piece Film: Red =

2022 film directed by Gorō Taniguchi

- Theatrical release poster
- Directed by: Gorō Taniguchi
- Screenplay by: Tsutomu Kuroiwa
- Based on: One Piece by Eiichiro Oda
- Starring: Mayumi Tanaka; Shuichi Ikeda; Kaori Nazuka; Kazuya Nakai; Akemi Okamura; Kappei Yamaguchi; Hiroaki Hirata; Ikue Ohtani; Yuriko Yamaguchi; Kazuki Yao; Chō; Kenjiro Tsuda
- Cinematography: Ejian Changgao
- Edited by: Kentaro Kawasaki
- Music by: Yasutaka Nakata
- Production company: Toei Animation
- Distributed by: Toei Company, Ltd.
- Release dates: July 22, 2022 (Tokyo premiere); August 6, 2022 (Japan)
- Running time: 115 minutes
- Country: Japan
- Language: Japanese
- Box office: $246.5 million

One Piece Film: Red (Japanese: ワンピース フィルム レッド, Hepburn: Wan Pīsu Firumu Reddo) is a 2022 Japanese animated musical fantasy action-adventure film directed by Gorō Taniguchi and produced by Toei Animation. It is the fifteenth feature film of the One Piece film series, based on the manga series of the same name by Eiichiro Oda.

It was first announced on November 21, 2021, in commemoration of the One Piece anime episode 1000's release and following the broadcast of the episode, a teaser trailer and poster was released on November 21, 2021. Its world premiere was in Nippon Budokan, Tokyo on July 22, 2022, for the celebration of 25th anniversary of One Piece manga and released theatrically on August 6, 2022, in Japan.

One Piece Film: Red received praise for its animation style, fight sequences and musical numbers. The film grossed over ¥20.33 billion in Japan making it the highest-grossing film of One Piece, the highest-grossing film of Toei Animation, the highest-grossing film of 2022 in Japan, the 4th highest-grossing Japanese film of all time in Japan, and the 6th highest-grossing film of all time in Japan. The film has been number one in box office ranking in Japan for eleven consecutive weeks, a feat achieved by only three Japanese films in history. As of January 29, 2023, the film grossed over US$246.5 million worldwide, making it the 7th highest-grossing Japanese film of all time.

== Plot ==
The Straw Hat Pirates arrive at Elegia to attend a concert by Uta, and Luffy greets her during the show because she is the daughter of "Red-Haired" Shanks. Displaying the unusual ability to conjure anything she wishes and trap anyone opposed to her, Uta implores Luffy to quit piracy and stay in her concert forever. The Straw Hats resist, and Uta traps all of them except Luffy, who is rescued by Trafalgar Law and Bartolomeo.

The Five Elders ruling the World Government deem Uta's power a great threat to the world, and Marine Fleet Admiral Akainu orders a convoy of battleships led by Admirals Kizaru and Fujitora to go to Elegia and subdue her. Luffy's group meets Uta's guardian Gordon, who explains that Uta hates pirates after learning about the suffering they have inflicted on her fans. Uta then confronts Gordon, and shows that she plans to use the song "Tot Musica" as a trump card in case her plan meets resistance, despite Gordon's pleas.

Luffy's group comes across Koby, Helmeppo, and Blueno, who explain Uta's power: she has eaten the Sing-Sing Fruit, and everyone who heard the concert is trapped in a dream dimension known as the Sing-Sing World. While this dimension normally ceases once Uta falls asleep, she is keeping herself awake and hastening her death by consuming a poisonous fungal called wake-shrooms; if she dies, the Sing-Sing World will be cut off from the real world forever. In the real world, the Marine fleet arrives at Elegia to find the concertgoers all sleeping, and Uta controls her victims' bodies to remove the Marines' hearing blockers. The Five Elders know that Uta has no more than two hours left to live, and 70% of the world's population will be trapped if she dies.

Koby's group helps the trapped pirates free themselves, and the Straw Hats head towards the castle to find a weakness in Uta's power. In the library, Nico Robin discovers that there is a way to make the worlds converge if a demonic being known as Tot Musica is summoned and then defeated in both worlds. Uta resumes her concert in the Sing-Sing World, but her audience begins to resist the idea of living in her world forever. Growing more unstable, Uta transforms all of them into inanimate objects. Luffy goes to confront Uta, and she claims that Shanks abandoned her on Elegia after destroying and plundering it. Uta decides to kill Luffy in the real world, but is stopped by Shanks and his crew.

Shanks tries to help Uta, but Akainu orders for the Marines to fire on her without regard for the concertgoers, forcing the Red-Haired Pirates to go on the defensive. A despairing Uta summons Tot Musica and continues attacking Luffy, but Gordon intercepts the blow and reveals that it was Tot Musica that destroyed Elegia in the past. Shanks had taken the blame for it, and left Uta behind so she could pursue her dream without being associated with a wanted criminal.

Usopp is able to attain a mental link with his father Yasopp via Observation Haki, and this allows the two of them to coordinate simultaneous attacks against Tot Musica in both worlds. After a long battle, Luffy and Shanks strike the finishing blows to defeat Tot Musica. However, since it has already consumed the Sing-Sing World, the souls trapped there do not return to the real world. Uta rejects a medicine from Shanks to cure the effects of the wake-shrooms in order to sing a song that will bring back everyone. Once she does this, the Marine forces move to seize her, but Shanks repels them with his Conqueror's Haki. As the Marines retreat, Shanks and Uta reconcile as father and daughter.

Luffy wakes up on the Thousand Sunny after his crew has already departed Elegia, and witnesses the Red-Haired Pirates' ship sailing away.

== Voice cast ==
Character	Japanese	English
Monkey D. Luffy	Mayumi Tanaka	Colleen Clinkenbeard
Shanks	Shūichi Ikeda	Brandon Potter
Uta	Kaori Nazuka; Ado (Singing voice)	Amanda Lee
Roronoa Zoro	Kazuya Nakai	Christopher Sabat
Nami	Akemi Okamura	Luci Christian
Usopp	Kappei Yamaguchi	Sonny Strait
Sanji	Hiroaki Hirata	Eric Vale
Tony Tony Chopper	Ikue Ōtani	Brina Palencia
Nico Robin	Yuriko Yamaguchi	Stephanie Young
Franky	Kazuki Yao	Patrick Seitz
Brook	Chō	Ian Sinclair
Jimbei	Katsuhisa Hōki	Daniel Baugh
Charlotte Oven	Masafumi Kimura	Jason Marnocha
Eboshi	Yuki Yamada	Orion Pitts
Gordon	Kenjiro Tsuda	Jim Foronda
Sunny-Kun	Houko Kuwashima	Lisa Ortiz
Romy	Chise Niitsu	Megan Shipman

== Production ==
=== Development ===
Gorō Taniguchi previously directed the 1998 OVA, One Piece: Take Down! The Pirate Ganzak!, at Production I.G when he was employed at the studio. It was the first animated adaptation of the One Piece manga, released before the broadcast of Toei Animation's anime series and had limited screenings in Japanese theaters. Oda stated that Taniguchi was "the first person to ever animate Luffy". After the first announcement of the film in November 2021, Taniguchi said that he wanted to express a One Piece that had never been seen before and that he would show it in One Piece Film: Red.

According to Shinji Shimizu, a producer of the One Piece anime at Toei Animation, One Piece Film: Red is the One Piece film that Eiichiro Oda most actively participated in the development of. Oda is the executive producer, character designer, and also script reviewer of the film. He also said that the film will be different from the previous One Piece films, saying its animation will primarily be in 2D but in some scenes will be in 3D CGI to make it more impactful.

The script for the film was developed by Oda, Taniguchi, and Tsutomu Kuroiwa for over two years. After finishing, Oda praised the final script saying, "It's fantastic!" Tsutomu Kuroiwa, the screenwriter, assured that One Piece Film: Red would be a great movie that would touch many hearts.

== Music ==
External videos
- "New Genesis"; The official music video of the main theme song by Ado and Yasutaka Nakata.

The film score was composed by Yasutaka Nakata, and the theme song for the film is "New Genesis" performed by Ado and produced by Nakata. Ado also performed six more songs as insert songs featuring Mrs. Green Apple, Vaundy, Fake Type., Hiroyuki Sawano, Yuta Orisaka, and Motohiro Hata in each and Toei Animation and Ado released their respective music videos on YouTube. The album Uta's Songs: One Piece Film Red, containing all the vocal songs from the film was released on August 10, 2022, while the score album published by Avex, containing 47 tracks, was released on October 28, 2022.

== Marketing ==
Ado performed seven songs featuring Yasutaka Nakata, Mrs. Green Apple, Vaundy, Fake Type., Hiroyuki Sawano, Yuta Orisaka, and Motohiro Hata in each, and Toei Animation and Ado released video songs on YouTube for the movie's promotions; these songs are also featured in the movie as the singing voice for character Uta. Since the theatrical release of the film in Japan, there have been multiple giveaways to the theater audience, including different manga and databook by Eiichiro Oda which were printed in millions of copies and were giveaways for most of the weekends since the release. The One Piece anime's regular episodes' releases were put on hold for three weeks and the film's three tie-in episodes were broadcast after the film's release in Japan.

== Release ==
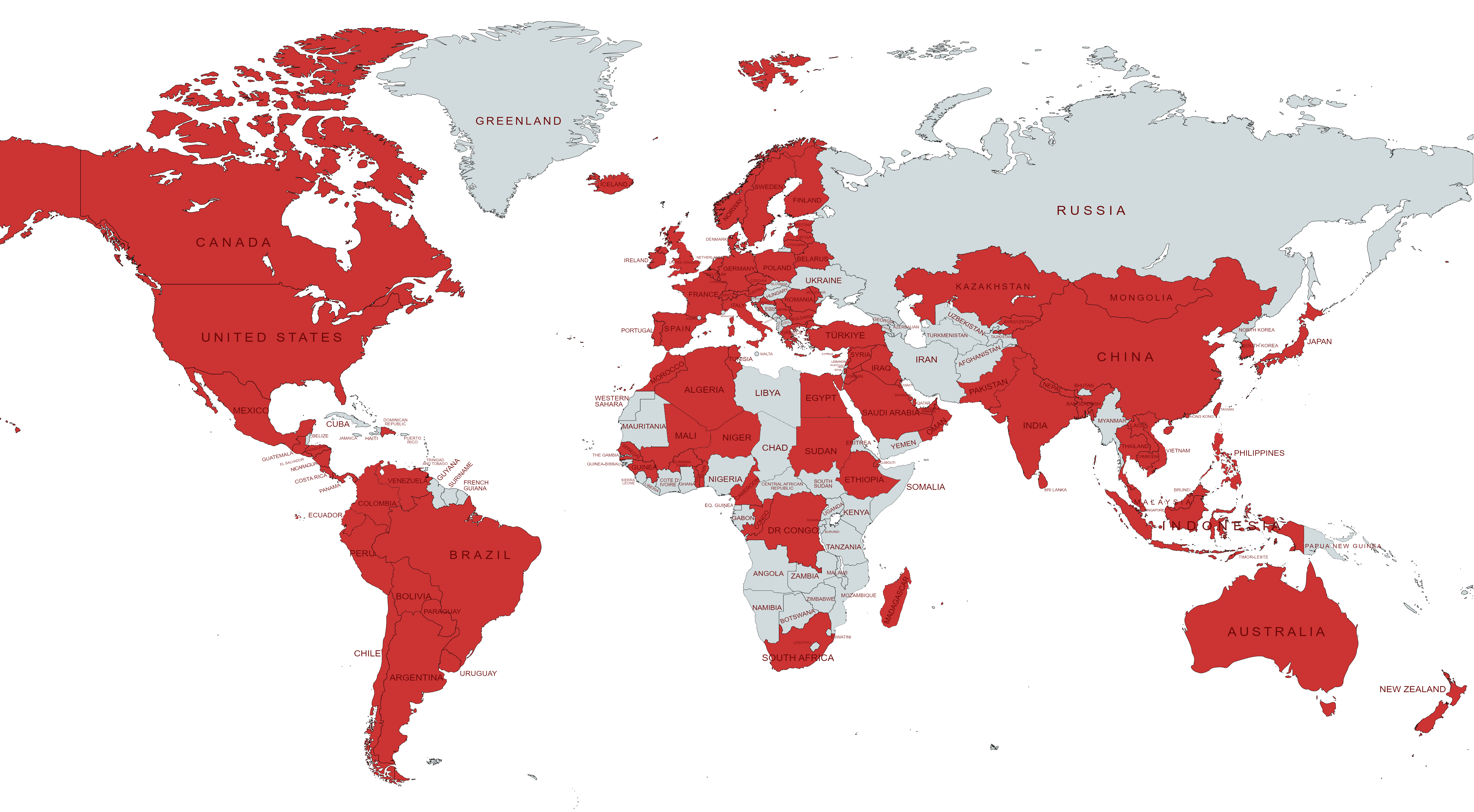
World map showing regions where the film theatrical release has been announced (red)

The film had its world premiere in Nippon Budokan, Tokyo on July 22, 2022, and was released theatrically on 495 screens in Japan on August 6, 2022, by its distributor Toei Company. It had its IMAX screenings in Japan in 27 theaters, which is the first time for a One Piece film. It is also available in MX4D, 4DX, and Dolby Atmos.

Pathé Films released the film in French speaking regions, subbed and dubbed in French, In France, the film premiered in Le Grand Rex, Paris and 481 screens on August 6, 2022 and was released on August 10, 2022, in 631 screens. In Belgium, Luxembourg, Switzerland (French-speaking region) and Swiss German regions it will be released on October 13, 2022. On August 10, 2022, it was also released in Morocco, Tunisia, Algeria, Mauritius and Mali. In Djibouti, the film was released on August 11, 2022 and on August 12, 2022, the film was released in Benin, Burkina Faso, Cameroon, Republic of the Congo, Democratic Republic of the Congo, Guinea, Niger, Senegal, Togo and Madagascar.

In Taiwan, the film was released on August 19, 2022. In China, the film premiered at Beijing International Film Festival on August 21, 2022. In Hong Kong and Macau, it was released in Cantonese, subbed and dubbed on August 25, 2022. In Thailand, the film had fan screening from August 16 to 21 and was widely released on August 25 by distributor Japan Anime Movie (JAM) Thailand.

Odex distributed the film in Singapore, Philippines, Malaysia and India. In Singapore, the film was released on September 29, 2022. In Malaysia, the film released on September 22, 2022. In the Netherlands, the film released on September 8, 2022. In Philippines, fan screenings on September 17 and 18, 2022 and was released on September 28, 2022. In Indonesia, CBI Pictures announced limited premiere release on September 16 to 18, 2022. In India, the film was released on October 7, 2022, by Odex and PVR Pictures. In Germany, the film was premiered on October 11, 2022, at Berlin and was released on October 13, 2022, in Germany and Austria by Crunchyroll. In Romania on October 14, 2022, in Romanian sub and dub.

In select MENA countries, Front Row Filmed Entertainment released the film on November 3, 2022, with English and Arabic subtitles. In Spain on November 4, 2022, was released subbed and dubbed in Spanish and Catalan by SelectaVisión, In U.S. and Canada, it was released on November 4, 2022, and in Australia and New Zealand, it was released on November 3, 2022, by Crunchyroll. Film Red became the first One Piece film to be distributed under the Crunchyroll brand after Sony Pictures acquired Crunchyroll in 2021 and merged it with Funimation in 2022.

In the U.K and Ireland, the film was released on November 4, 2022 by Anime Limited. CGV released the movie in Vietnam on November 25, 2022, by Tagger with a teaser announced before the release in their local YouTube channel. In Italy the movie had its premiére at Lucca Comics and Games 2022 and was released in theaters by Koch Media's Anime Factory brand in autumn. Diamond Films has been teasing a release of One Piece media in Latin America. In Pakistan, the film was released on October 7. In Israel, the film was released on December 1. In Portuguese-speaking countries, the film was shown in Brazil on November 2 by Diamond Films, and in Portugal on November 3 by NOS Audiovisuais.

== Reception ==
=== Box office ===
==== Japan ====
The film was released on weekend and became a box office hit in the country. On its opening day, the film had box office revenues and admissions of ¥1,232,095,230 and 869,407 respectively. It is the biggest opening for a One Piece film ever, the third film in Japanese history to make over 1 billion yen on opening day, the best Saturday opening ever for IMAX, and also the second biggest opening day of all the time in Japan. In its second day, it had ¥1,022,141,800 and 710,145 box office revenue and admissions respectively, totaling to ¥2,254,237,030 and 1,579,552 in the weekend. This makes the film the best opening weekend for August in Japan, the biggest weekend box office of 2022 so far, the highest ever opening weekend for distributor Toei Company, the second-biggest two-day opening weekend for a film in Japanese history, and also the second ever film in Japan to gross more than 1 billion yen two days in a row.

In 8 days, the film has already surpassed 5 billion yen on 3.6 million admissions, making it the second fastest film to reach that box office record of all the time in Japan. In 10 days, the film became the highest-grossing film in the One Piece franchise after it earned more than 7.06 billion yen (US$52.97 million) with over 5 million tickets sold in 502 screens and overtook One Piece Film: Z total box office revenue in Japan. In 13 days, the film had grossed more than 8 billion yen ($60.31 million) with over 5.7 million admissions. It is the second-fastest film in Japanese box office history to reach 8 billion yen after Demon Slayer: Mugen Train. As of its 3rd weekend, the film grossed ¥9,281,365,450 ($67.59 million) with over 6.65 million admissions. It surpassed Detective Conan: The Bride of Halloween and Studio Ghibli's Arrietty. In 20 days, the film grossed over ¥10 billion with over 7.2 million admissions. The film became the second-fastest film in Japan to reach the 10 billion yen milestone surpassing the mark 5 days ahead of Hayao Miyazaki's Spirited Away, and the 41st film in Japan to ever pass this mark. As of its 4th weekend, the film ranked first place and grossed ¥11.454 billion (US$83.32 million) with over 8.2 million admissions.

In 26 days, the film grossed over ¥12 billion (US$87.26 million) with over 8.6 million tickets sold. The film is the second fastest film ever to reach ¥12 billion and it overtook Top Gun: Maverick as the second-highest-grossing film in 2022 in Japan which Japanese box offices track as December 2021 to November 2022. As of its 6th weekend, the film grossed over ¥13.87 billion (US$100.48 million) with 9.94 million admissions making it the highest-grossing film of 2022. As of 38th day in Japanese theaters, the film has grossed more than 13.94 billion yen on the back of more than 10 million tickets sold. It is the 21st film to ever breach the 10 million tickets sold and the fourth fastest film to do so in Japan. As of its 7th weekend, the film grossed over 14.9 billion yen (US$103.8 million) on 10.72 million admissions, making it the seventh top-grossing anime film of all time in Japan after surpassing Makoto Shinkai's 2019 film Weathering With You (14.19 billion yen).

In 46 days, the film sailed to over 15.006 billion yen (US$108.57 million) at the box office on the back of 10.76 million tickets sold to Japanese audiences. Its the 13th film to have ever crossed the 15 billion yen mark in Japan. As of its 8th weekend, the film grossed over 15.7 billion yen (US$108.7 million) on 11.26 million admissions, making it the 6th highest-grossing anime film of all time and 11th highest-grossing film of all time in Japan, surpassing Hayao Miyazaki's Ponyo and James Cameron's Avatar. As of its 11th weekend, the film has been 2022 box office number-one film in Japan for eleven consecutive weeks making it the fifth film (including Hollywood films) in Japanese history to do so and grossed 17.1 billion yen on 12.31 million admissions. As of its 12th weekend, the film has grossed a total of 17.356 billion yen on the back of 12.5 million tickets sold. It is currently the ninth highest-grossing film of all time in Japan after it has overtaken both Harry Potter and the Chamber of Secrets and Bayside Shakedown 2. As of its 14th weekend, the film box office revenue has surpassed 18 billion yen (US$122.7 million) on 13 million admissions and has been number one position in ranking for 13 weekends. At the end of year 2022, it is reported that the film has been in the Top 10 Japanese Box office for 20 consecutive weeks, beating the likes of the original Avatar, Weathering With You and Frozen. Also, it is officially announced that the film is the highest-earning film of 2022 in Japan.

The film had sold over 14.27 million tickets and earned a total of 19.70 billion yen (about US$152 million) in its original theatrical run that lasted 177 days in Japanese theaters.

More than a year after it premiered in Japan, the film was re-screened again for a month. On October 29, 2023, the film became the eighth film in history to pass 20 billion yen in Japan after grossing 300 million yen from 230,000 tickets sold from its two weeks of re-release. Encore screenings ended on November 19, 2023, with the film earning a total of 20.33 billion yen from 14.74 million tickets sold, making it the 6th highest-earning film of all time in Japan and the 4th highest-earning anime film of all time in Japan.

==== Other territories ====
- In France, the film premiered in Le Grand Rex, Paris for more than 2,700 audience and other cinemas on August 6, 2022. With 119,311 total admissions, the film became One Piece franchise's biggest hit in French cinemas and the best premiere of all-time for a Japanese animated film in France. Also, the film set another box office record with having the highest number of first-day ticket sales in the country for an anime film ever. It surpassed the previous opening day record of Pokémon: The Movie 2000 after having total admissions (including premiere) of 267,631. In 5 days, the film ranked first place in its opening weekend box office and sold 488,631 tickets (including premiere) exceeding the result at the same stage of Jujutsu Kaisen 0 (293,331 tickets), My Hero Academia: World Heroes' Mission (118,525 tickets) and Demon Slayer: Kimetsu no Yaiba – The Movie: Mugen Train (330,000 tickets). In 7 days, the film had sold 575,182 tickets and became the second best 7-days box office admission for a Japanese animated film in France behind Pokémon: The Movie 2000 (807,806 tickets). As of August 28, the film had sold 855,100 tickets (US$6,067,077) and had exceeded the total admission of Demon Slayer: Kimetsu no Yaiba – The Movie: Mugen Train (727,889 tickets). The film is nearing 1 million admission in France by selling 937,077 tickets as of the fourth weekend and 977,000 tickets as of the ten weekend.
- In Germany and Austria, the film had recorded a number of 100,000 visitors and occupies first place in the German Cinema Charts on its opening day. Additionally, the movie received an enormous amount of more than a quarter of a million viewers during its opening weekend and came in a first position on the Weekly Chart. After running for less than two weeks in the theaters, the film has reached an impressive number of over 300,000 visitors.
- In the United States, the film earned $4.8 million on its opening day, beating Black Adam for the day and making it already the highest-grossing One Piece film in the country, surpassing One Piece: Stampede ($1.3 million). It went on to debut to $9.3 million, finishing second behind Black Adam.
- In China, the film became the fastest selling film in 12th Beijing International Film Festival after its tickets was sold out in a minute just after its release. The film ranked first place and earned ¥74.96 million on its opening weekend despite only about 30% to 40% of movie theaters in China were opened. On its second weekend, the film also ranked first place in box office ranking and grossed ¥33.5 million ($4.8 million). In 10 days, the film cumulative box office is ¥127 million ($18.10 million).
- In Taiwan, the film ranked first place and grossed NT$57.793 million in its opening weekend. It surpassed the total box office revenue of One Piece: Stampede (NT$54.2M) in Taiwan. Also, the film had surpassed Jujutsu Kaisen 0 opening weekend box office revenue (NT$55.83 million) and became the best opening weekend in 2022 for a Japanese animated film in the country. As of its 4th weekend, the film grossed over NT$155 million (US$5.01 million) and remained first place for 4 consecutive weeks in box office ranking in Taiwan.
- In Thailand, the film became the highest grossing opening day and opening weekend of all-time for a Japanese Animated film in Thailand after it earned 17.8 million baht and 71.70 million baht respectively. In the first week, it became the fastest anime film to gross 100 million bhat. Additionally, the film has been number one in box office ranking for two consecutive weeks.
- In Indonesia, the film has over 1.36 million admissions, making it the best-selling anime film ever in the country.
- In Saudi Arabia, the film ranked number one in its opening weekend at Saudi Arabian box office, selling 61,000 tickets and earning US$1.05 million. It is the biggest-ever opening weekend for a Japanese animated film in the country. The film sold 14% higher than Jujutsu Kaisen 0 and 50% more than Demon Slayer The Movie: Mugen Train. It also achieved one of the biggest-ever opening days for a PG-12 movie in the country, the second biggest-ever opening day for an animated film behind Universal's Minions: The Rise of Gru, and earned 286% more than Sonic the Hedgehog 2.
- In India, the film has grossed ₹3.15 Crores (US$382,339) in just 10 days after its debut, surpassing the entire box office earnings of Dragon Ball Super: Super Hero despite its limited distribution.
- In South Korea, the film grossed ₩428.15 million in its opening day surpassing already the total box office revenue of One Piece: Stampede (₩189,707,460). In 12 days, the film earned ₩1.831 billion, making it the highest grossing One Piece film in South Korea after surpassing the total box office revenue (₩1.710 billion) of One Piece Film: Gold in the country.

As of 29 January 2023, the film has grossed US$246.5 million worldwide, making it the 6th highest-grossing anime film of all-time and 6th highest-grossing Japanese film of all-time.

=== Critical response ===
On the review aggregator website Rotten Tomatoes, 95% of 38 critics' reviews are positive, with an average rating of 7.7/10. The website's consensus reads: "It may not be the best entry point for newcomers, but One Piece Film Red offers everything fans of the franchise will be looking for." Metacritic, which uses a weighted average, assigned the film a score of 69 out of 100, based on eight critics, indicating "generally favorable" reviews. Audiences polled by CinemaScore gave the film an average grade of "A" on an A+ to F scale, while those at PostTrak gave it an 88% overall positive score.

=== Music chart ===
The film's main theme song "New Genesis" by Ado, topped Apple Music's Global Top 100 charts, making it the first for a Japanese song, and the number one song in the world, beating out songs from Beyoncé and DJ Khaled.

In August 31, Oricon reported that Ado has three of the tracker's digital rankings for three consecutive weeks which happen for the first time ever in Oricon's history. Also, she is the first artist ever in Oricon's history to have five songs in the "Top 5 Streaming Chart" doing so for the past two weeks. These five songs from the film ("New Genesis", "I'm Invincible", "Backlight", "Fleeting Lullaby", and "Tot Musica") had been dominating the top five "Weekly Streaming Chart" in two weeks and its the first time ever that each song in the top five had reached over 10 million plays over the last week. Furthermore, the album Uta's Songs: One Piece Film Red has been in the top place in the "Weekly Digital Album Ranking" for the past three weeks. As for the main theme song, "New Genesis", it has been the number one in "Weekly Digital Single (Single Song) Ranking" for over the past four weeks and it marks the second time a solo female artist has topped the charts for a month after LiSA's "Homura" did so for 13 weeks back in late 2020 / early 2021. This is its 12th week at number one (106,916,252 plays) and is the 4th fastest song in Japanese history to reach 100 million plays.

On September 7, 2022, Ado broke another record after Oricon reported that she had three of the tracker's digital rankings for four consecutive weeks on which she is the only artist who had ever done so.

== Accolades ==
Year	Award	Category	Recipient	Result	Ref.
2022	MTV Video Music Awards Japan	Song of the Year	"New Genesis"	Won	
2022	64th Japan Record Awards	Excellent Work Awards	"New Genesis"	Won	
2022	Internet Buzzword Awards	Number 1 in the list	Uta	Won	
2023	77th Mainichi Film Awards	Best Animation Film / Ōfuji Noburō Award	One Piece Film: Red	Nominated	
2023	7th Crunchyroll Anime Awards	Best Film	One Piece Film: Red	Nominated	
2023	7th Crunchyroll Anime Awards	Best Anime Song	"New Genesis"	Nominated	
2023	Manga Barcelona Awards	Best Anime Movie Release	One Piece Film: Red	Won	
2023	Manga Barcelona Awards	Best Anime Edition in Physical Format	One Piece Film: Red	Won	
2023	46th Japan Academy Film Prize	Special Award (The Chairman's Distinguished Service Award)	One Piece Film: Red	Won	
2023	46th Japan Academy Film Prize	Popularity Award (Best Picture)	One Piece Film: Red	Won	
2023	46th Japan Academy Film Prize	Excellent Animation of the Year	One Piece Film: Red	Won	
2023	Elan d'or Awards	Elan d'or Award Special Prize	One Piece Film: Red Production Committee	Won	
2023	Tokyo Anime Award Festival	Best Animated Film	One Piece Film: Red	Won	
2023	Tokyo Anime Award Festival	Best Director	Goro Taniguchi	Won	
2023	Tokyo Anime Award Festival	Best Music	Ado	Won	
2023	18th Shin Watanabe Award	Shin Watanabe Award	Eiichiro Oda	Won	
2023	28th AMD Awards	Excellence Award	Uta	Won	
2023	37th Japan Gold Disc Award	Special Award	Ado	Won	
2023	37th Japan Gold Disc Award	Animation Album of the Year	Uta's Songs: One Piece Film Red	Won	
2023	37th Japan Gold Disc Award	Best 3 Songs by Download	"New Genesis"	Won	
2023	37th Japan Gold Disc Award	Best 5 Songs by Streaming	"New Genesis" and "I'm Invincible"	Won	
2024	8th Crunchyroll Anime Awards	Best Voice Artist Performance (Castilian)	Marta Moreno as Uta	Nominated	
2024	8th Crunchyroll Anime Awards	Best Voice Artist Performance (Italian)	Federica Simonelli as Uta	Nominated	

== See also ==
- List of One Piece films
- List of One Piece media
