= Suzume =

2022 Japanese anime film by Makoto Shinkai

- Theatrical release poster
- Japanese: すずめの戸締まり
- Literal meaning: Suzume's Locking Up
- Revised Hepburn: Suzume no Tojimari
- Directed by: Makoto Shinkai
- Written by: Makoto Shinkai
- Produced by: Kōichirō Itō; Kinue Itō; Wakana Okamura
- Starring: Nanoka Hara; Hokuto Matsumura; Eri Fukatsu; Shota Sometani; Sairi Ito; Kotone Hanase; Kana Hanazawa; Matsumoto Hakuō II
- Cinematography: Ryōsuke Tsuda
- Edited by: Makoto Shinkai
- Music by: Radwimps; Kazuma Jinnouchi
- Production companies: CoMix Wave Films; Story Inc. (production produce)
- Distributed by: Toho
- Release date: November 11, 2022
- Running time: 122 minutes
- Country: Japan
- Language: Japanese
- Box office: US$315 million

Suzume (Japanese: すずめの戸締まり, Hepburn: Suzume no Tojimari; lit. 'Suzume's Locking Up') is a 2022 Japanese animated coming-of-age fantasy adventure film written and directed by Makoto Shinkai. The third and final installment of Shinkai's Disaster trilogy, following Your Name (2016) and Weathering with You (2019), the film follows seventeen-year-old high school girl Suzume Iwato and young stranger Souta Munakata, who team up to prevent a series of disasters across Japan by sealing doors from the colossal, supernatural worm that causes earthquakes after being released.

Produced by CoMix Wave Films with Story Inc. handling production produce, it features the voices of Nanoka Hara and Hokuto Matsumura, with character designs by Masayoshi Tanaka, animation direction by Kenichi Tsuchiya, and art direction by Takumi Tanji. The musical score was composed by Radwimps and Kazuma Jinnouchi. The film began production in early 2020, eventually being announced as completed by October 2022. Its themes were inspired by the 2011 Tōhoku earthquake and tsunami. A novel adaptation, also written by Shinkai, and a manga series illustrated by Denki Amashima both debuted prior to the film's release.

Suzume first premiered in IMAX in Japan on November 7, 2022, followed by a theatrical release by Toho on November 11. It received largely positive reviews from critics, with praise directed towards the characters, animation, visuals, music, and emotional weight. The film grossed US$315 million worldwide, becoming the fourth-highest-grossing anime film at the time and the fourth-highest-grossing film of 2022 in Japan. Among its numerous accolades, the film was nominated for Best Animated Feature at the 81st Golden Globe Awards and received seven nominations at the 51st Annie Awards.

== Plot ==
High-school girl Suzume Iwato lives with her aunt Tamaki in a town in Kyushu. She dreams of her childhood self walking through a ruined cityscape at night, before running into a shadowy figure resembling her late mother. One morning, Suzume meets a young man searching for abandoned locations with doors, and tells him of a nearby abandoned onsen resort. Following him there, Suzume discovers a free-standing door, which she opens to find a starlit field that she cannot enter. She trips over a cat statue on the floor, which turns into a real cat and flees, before rushing to school.

During lunch, Suzume notices a large column of smoke outside the classroom window from the abandoned resort, which no one else can see. There, she finds the man from earlier struggling to close the door from which the smoke escapes. Suzume helps him lock the door with an old key. The smoke disappears, but not before causing earthquake-like damage to the town.

Suzume takes the injured man, Souta Munakata, to her home. Souta is a "Closer" who locates and locks specific doors in abandoned places throughout Japan to prevent a supernatural "worm" from being released, causing earthquakes. The cat from the resort turns Souta into the chair he was sitting on. He and Suzume chase the cat onto a ferry headed for Ehime. Souta tells Suzume that the cat is a "keystone" she removed at the resort, releasing the worm from it.

Upon reaching Ehime, Suzume and Souta find that netizens have dubbed the cat "Daijin". They encounter the worm again after helping a girl named Chika save oranges from rolling down a hill, with whom they travel to seal a door at an abandoned school. Afterwards, Suzume stays the night at Chika's family hotel.

The next day, Suzume and Souta hitchhike to Kobe with a woman named Rumi. Suzume helps at Rumi's bar before seeing Daijin leading them to an abandoned amusement park, stopping the worm from emerging through a ferris wheel gondola. While closing the door, Suzume asks about the starry field. Souta explains that the portal within the doors lead to the Ever-After, where souls go after death.

Tracking Daijin to Tokyo, Souta asks Suzume to take them to his apartment. He explains the legend of the worm, and that he is the last descendant of a generational family who locked doors to the Ever-After. The western keystone has become Daijin, while the location of the eastern keystone is unknown. He warns that if the worm tries to emerge in Tokyo, its damage will be similar to the 1923 Great Kantō earthquake.

Suzume notices the worm's emergence, so she and Souta hop in the worm as it fully breaks to find Daijin, who reveals that he has passed on his function as keystone to Souta and if they don't want the worm to fall, Souta has to be used to seal it. Souta suddenly starts crystalizing, forcing Suzume to use him to seal the worm.

Awakening at a shrine housing the Tokyo door, Suzume sees Souta within the Ever-After but is unable to enter. Suzume goes to visit Souta's grandfather Hitsujirō at the hospital, hoping to discover how to rescue Souta. Hitsujirō explains that Suzume's ability to see the worm and the Ever-After through the doors means that at some point in her life she entered the realm through one such door, the only door where she can re-enter the Ever-After.

Suzume runs into Souta's friend Tomoya Serizawa, and Tamaki, who wants to take her back home to Kyushu. She instead convinces Tomoya to drive her and Tamaki to her childhood hometown in Tōhoku, destroyed by the 2011 earthquake and tsunami that killed her mother, to find the door she first visited. At a rest stop along the way, Suzume discovers that her aunt is possessed by Sadaijin, the eastern keystone. They reach the ruins of Suzume's old house and town, after looking at her old journal from when she was a kid. Suzume finds the door and enters it with Daijin and Sadaijin.

Inside the Ever-After, Sadaijin distracts the worm, while Suzume awakens Souta, who regains his human form. Realizing the consequences of his freedom, Daijin reverts himself to being the western keystone. Suzume and Souta use him and Sadaijin to imprison the worm again in the Ever-After. Afterwards, Suzume sees a young girl in the Ever-After with them. She realizes the young girl is herself, from 12 years ago, and that the younger Suzume mistook her older self as her mother. Suzume gives her the chair that had been Souta's body, built by her mother as a childhood birthday present, allowing younger Suzume to leave the Ever-After, to be taken in by Tamaki. Souta returns to Tokyo while Suzume and Tamaki return to Kyushu. A year later, Suzume unexpectedly encounters Souta again on the road where they first met.

== Voice cast ==
Character	Voice actor	
Character	Japanese	English
Suzume Iwato (岩戸 鈴芽, Iwato Suzume)	Nanoka Hara; Akari Miura (young)	Nichole Sakura; Bennet Hetrick (young)
Souta Munakata (宗像 草太, Munakata Sōta)	Hokuto Matsumura	Josh Keaton
Tamaki Iwato (岩戸 環, Iwato Tamaki)	Eri Fukatsu	Jennifer Sun Bell
Minoru Okabe (岡部 稔, Okabe Minoru)	Shota Sometani	Roger Craig Smith
Rumi Ninomiya (二ノ宮 ルミ, Ninomiya Rumi)	Sairi Ito	Amanda C. Miller
Chika Amabe (海部 千果, Amabe Chika)	Kotone Hanase	Rosalie Chiang
Tsubame Iwato (岩戸 椿芽, Iwato Tsubame)	Kana Hanazawa	Allegra Clark
Hitsujirō Munakata (宗像 羊朗, Munakata Hitsujirō)	Matsumoto Hakuō II	Cam Clarke
Tomoya Serizawa (芹澤 朋也, Serizawa Tomoya)	Ryunosuke Kamiki	Joe Zieja
Daijin (ダイジン)	Ann Yamane	Lena Josephine Marano
Miki (ミキ)	Aimi	Mela Lee

== Production ==
=== Development ===
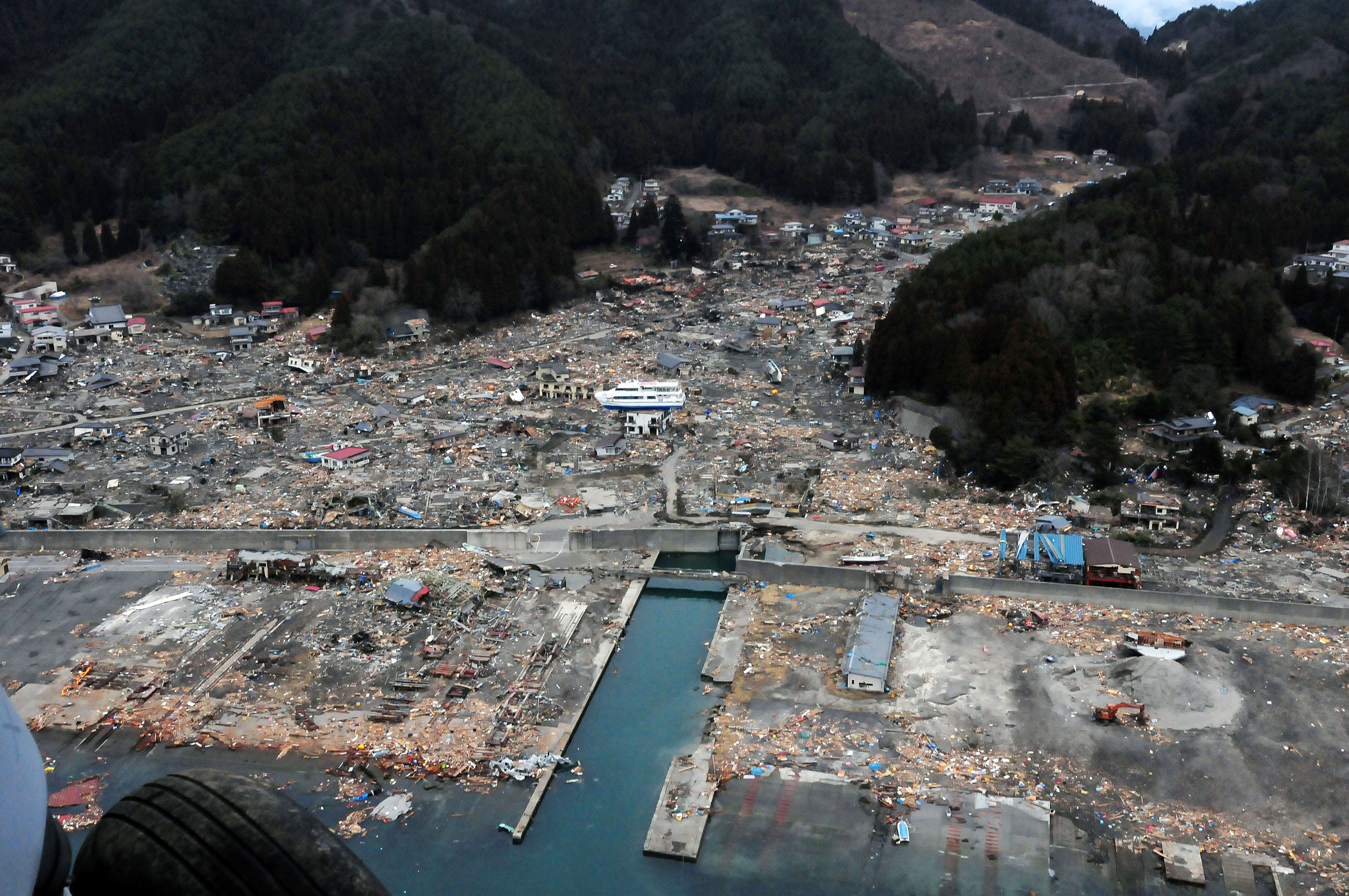
The 2011 Tōhoku earthquake and tsunami served as an influence for the film. The stranded catamaran Hamayuri in this aerial image taken in Ōtsuchi, Iwate, became the prototype of the stranded vessel appearing in the afterlife scene.

Makoto Shinkai conceived the idea for Suzume while he was traveling around Japan to give talks about his past works. He said, "In Japan, it is customary to hold a jichinsai or groundbreaking ceremony, before construction begins on a new building or home, but we do nothing when we close them down." Shinkai noticed that there were more empty or abandoned areas in Japan due to the country's declining birth rate and aging population, so he thought of writing a story about "mourning deserted places." As a result, the film inevitably turned into a road movie about visiting places.

The 2011 Tōhoku earthquake and tsunami served as a major influence for the themes in the film. While the Tiamat comet in Your Name (2016) and the concept of Weathering with You (2019) were ideas influenced by the natural disaster, Shinkai felt that he should "express the impact [he] felt through the earthquake and tsunami, instead of continuing to depict it as a metaphor." He feared that people's memories of the disaster start to become "hazy" over time, and by depicting the earthquake and tsunami in his film or novel, he could also share his memories with teens who were unaware of the disaster. Shinkai also cited Kiki's Delivery Service, Guardian: The Lonely and Great God, and Haruki Murakami's novel Kafka on the Shore and short story "Super-Frog Saves Tokyo" as influences for the film.

Shinkai and his staff planned the project from January to March 2020. They started developing the film's script in April, which is when the Japanese government declared a state of emergency due to the COVID-19 pandemic. In an interview with TV Asahi, Shinkai mentioned that the pandemic had a less tangible effect on the film's production. However, he said that "the mood of the times is indelibly etched into the script", adding that the film will have a post-apocalyptic theme. Souta turning into a chair was in reference to Shinkai feeling trapped during the COVID-19 curbs. After finishing the script in August, the storyboards were drafted from September 2020 to December 2021, while the production of the animation started in April 2021. The film was officially unveiled during a press conference on December 15, 2021. The film's staff includes Masayoshi Tanaka as the character designer, Kenichi Tsuchiya as the animation director, and Takumi Tanji as the art director. CoMix Wave Films and Story Inc. were revealed as the film's producers. In October 2022, Shinkai announced that production on the film was completed.

=== Characters ===
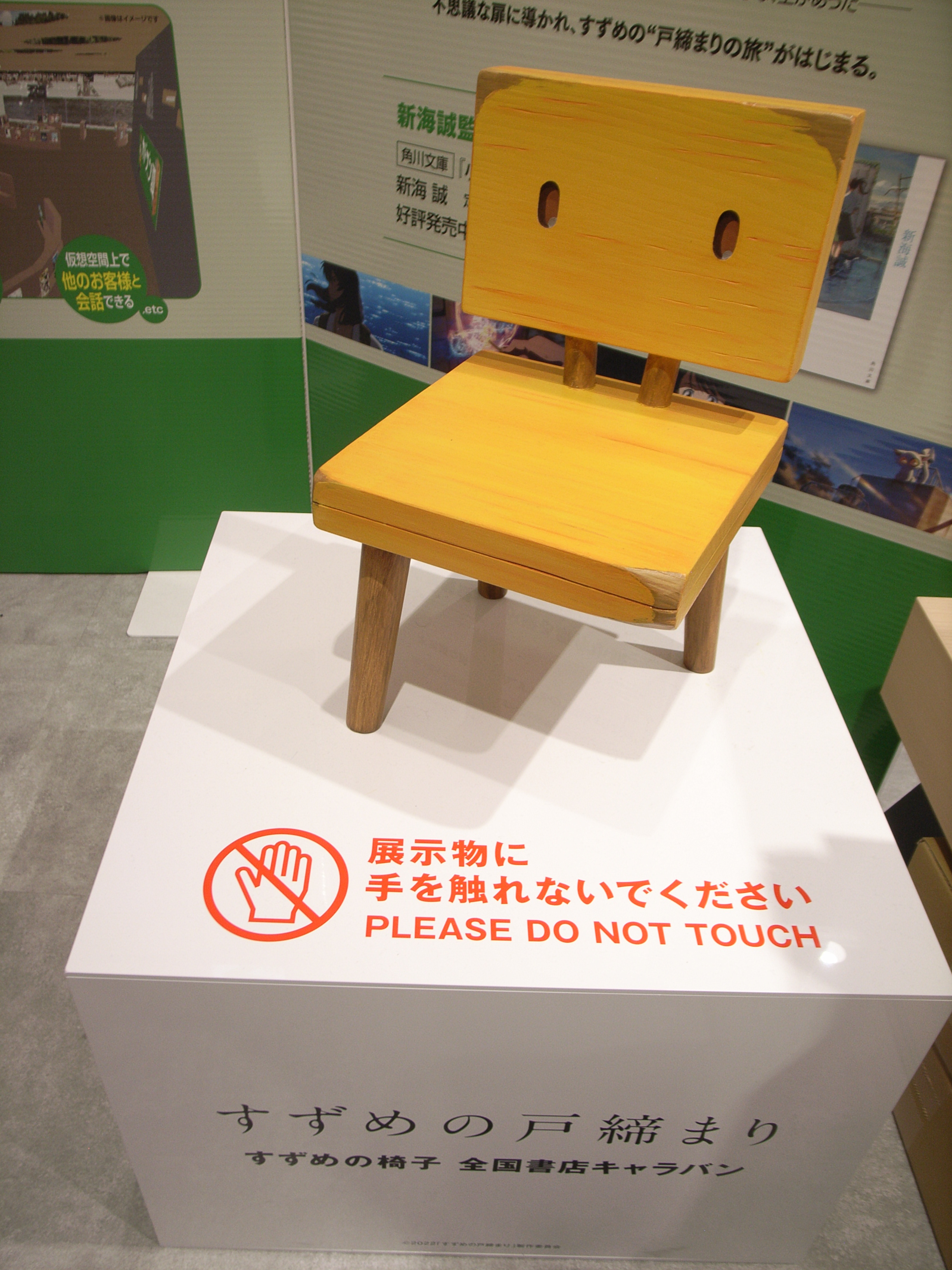
A replica of the chair featured in Suzume, displayed at a Kinokuniya in Shinjuku

Shinkai immediately decided for the film to have a female main character, since Weathering with You had a male main character, and also felt that a "buddy" character was necessary. Initially, he wanted Suzume's companion to be another girl, with a "sisterhood type of romantic story", as he believed that he had exhausted the potential of the "boy meets girl" formula in previous films. However, Shinkai's producer discouraged the idea, saying that the audience for his films was still enjoying the typical romance aspects of his films. Thus, making the partner a chair was decided upon both to avoid the film becoming "too much of a romance," and also to lighten the mood of the film, which would "inevitably become quieter" if the story focused on mourning a place. Shinkai also considered other options for potential partners, such as a partner that turns into a monster throughout the story, and other "inorganic partners" like a milk carton. The idea for a chair partner came when Shinkai saw a wooden chair sitting at a deserted bus stop, and found its "foreign feeling" to be better than any of his previous ideas. Shinkai also became less interested in writing a love story and wanted to depict different relationships, like with Suzume and her aunt.

=== Casting ===
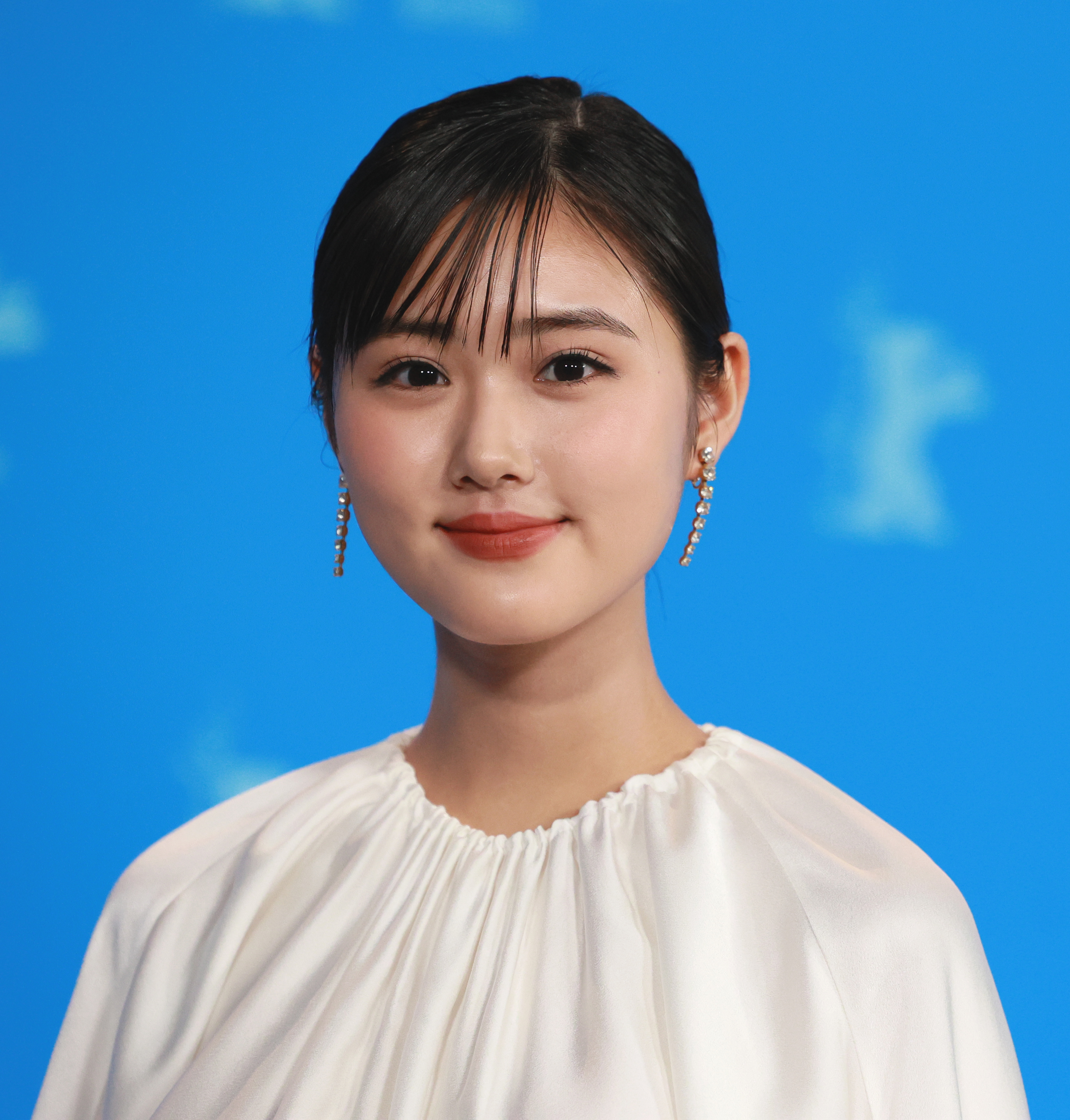
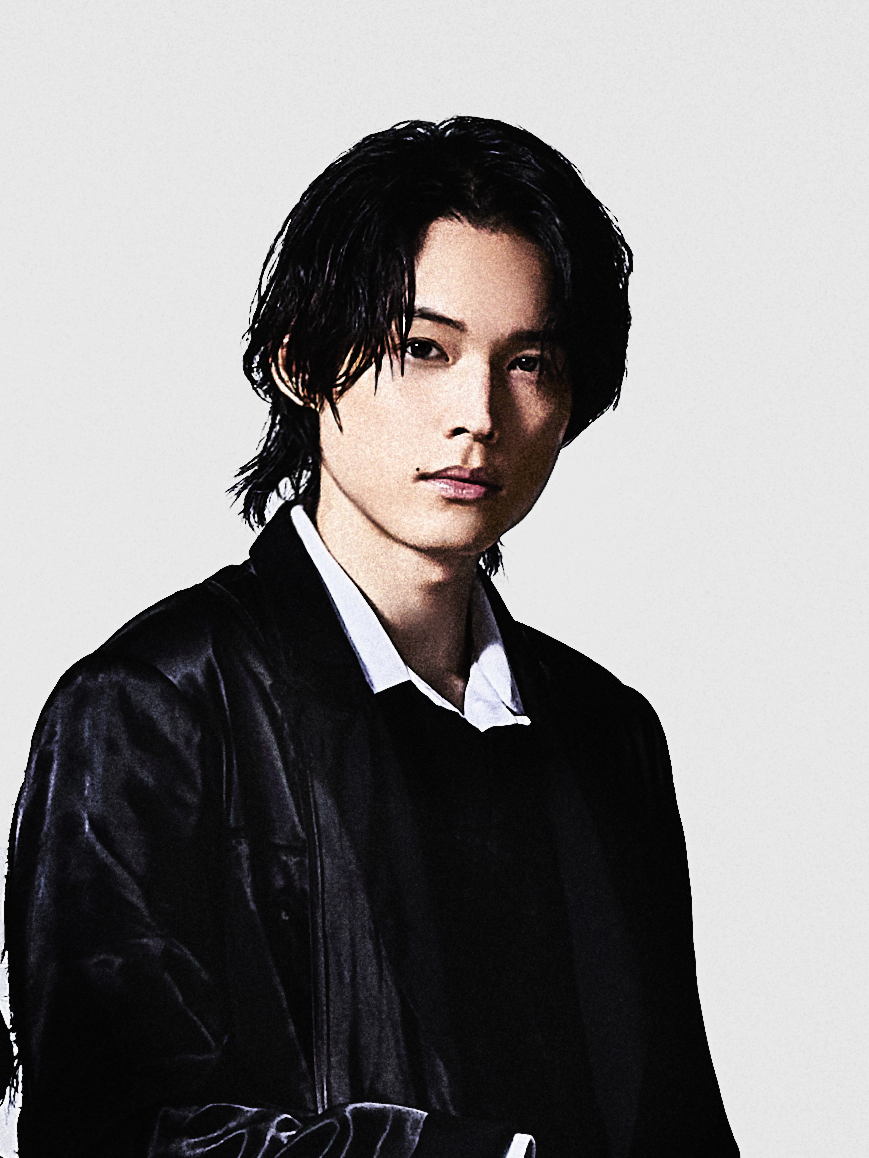
Nanoka Hara (left) and Hokuto Matsumura (right) provided the voices for Suzume and Souta, respectively.

Nanoka Hara was revealed as the voice of Suzume Iwato on July 5, 2022. Shinkai selected her from an audition involving more than 1,700 people. Hara has been a fan of Shinkai's works, remarking that she could not imagine being the one to share the "unforgettable, heart-shaking sensation" she felt when first seeing one of his films in theaters. On September 6, 2022, Hokuto Matsumura's role as Souta Munakata was revealed. He described the character as one that "[he] had never seen in any of the director's works". Therefore, Matsumura gave a voice for Souta that he "had never heard before," which involved using a slightly lower tone. Shinkai found his voice to be "impressive" and said that it "embodies the character". These were Hara and Matsumura's first anime voice-acting roles. On September 29, Eri Fukatsu, Shota Sometani, Sairi Ito, Kotone Hanase, Kana Hanazawa, and Matsumoto Hakuō II were revealed to be joining the voice cast. On October 25, Ryūnosuke Kamiki, who voiced Taki Tachibana in Your Name, was added to the cast for the role of Tomoya Serizawa.

== Music ==
On September 20, 2022, it was announced that the band Radwimps, which had previously collaborated with Shinkai on Your Name and Weathering with You, would be composing the score for the film, along with composer Kazuma Jinnouchi. It was also revealed that TikTok singer Toaka provided the vocals for the first theme song, "Suzume" (すずめ), which debuted on music streaming services on September 30, 2022. The second theme song, "Kanata Haluka" (カナタハルカ), debuted online on October 28, 2022. The soundtrack was released on November 11, 2022, the day of the film's release. Some of its recordings were done at Abbey Road Studios in London.

== Marketing ==
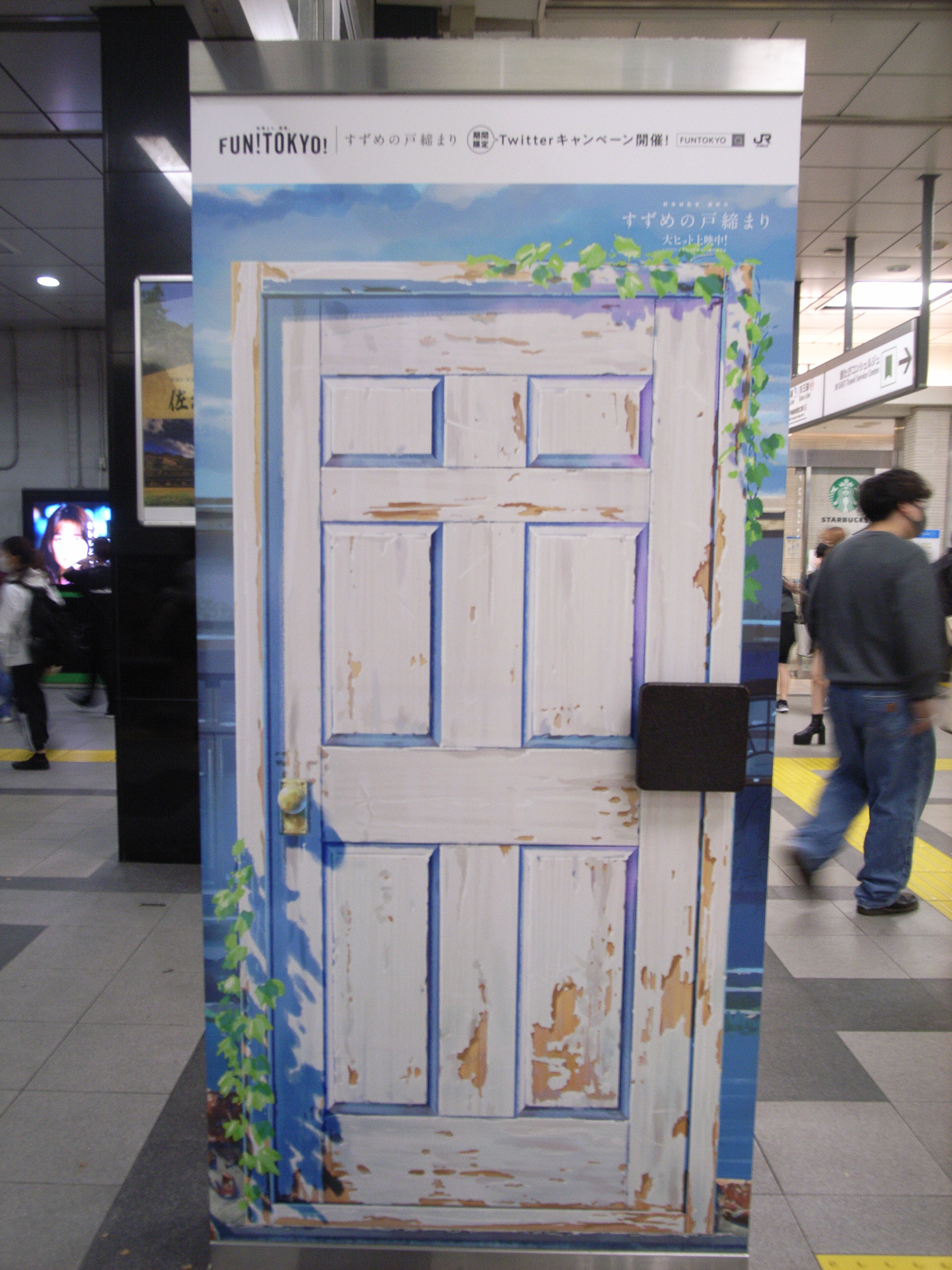
Promotional standee of the door featured in the film

A teaser poster was released alongside the film's announcement. On April 9, 2022, an updated version featuring the film's protagonist was released online and as a full-page advertisement in the morning edition of The Asahi Shimbun newspaper. It was also announced that the film would be released on November 11. Toho debuted a teaser trailer on April 10, 2022, and a full trailer was released on July 15. The main poster, along with the second trailer, was released on September 29, 2022. Nippon TV previewed the first 12 minutes of the film on October 28, 2022, during a broadcast of Your Name on NNN's Kin'yō Road Show programming block. Prior to the film's release, the production committee warned filmgoers of scenes in the film that depict an earthquake and sounds of earthquake alarms, and reassured that the sounds were fictional.

Several bonus items were given to filmgoers in Japan. A booklet, titled Shinkai Makoto Hon (新海誠本), was the first to be distributed, and had a print run of 3 million copies. The booklet contained the original proposals for Suzume, Your Name, and Weathering with You, and interviews with Shinkai, Hara, and Matsumura. A second booklet, Shinkai Makoto Hon 2 (新海誠本2), was distributed beginning on December 3, with a print run of 1.5 million copies. A spin-off novel written by Shinkai, subtitled "Tamaki's Story" (環さんのものがたり, Tamaki-san no Monogatari), was given starting on December 24. A second novel, "Serizawa's Story" (芹澤のものがたり, Serizawa no Monogatari), was distributed starting on January 28, 2023. McDonald's Japan released a Happy Meal set that includes a spin-off picture book, titled Suzume to Isu (すずめといす; "Suzume and the Chair"), which tells an original story written by Shinkai and illustrated by Senbon Umishima. Other partners for the film include Misawa Homes, Lawson, and KDDI's au. Additionally, a promotional campaign was held involving one local company from each of the 47 prefectures of Japan. The film also had a 20-page special feature in the #50/2022 issue of Kodansha's Weekly Shōnen Magazine.

== Release ==
=== Theatrical ===
World map showing countries and regions where the film was released theatrically

Suzume had an advance IMAX screening on November 7, 2022, for watchers who were decided through a lottery. It was released nationwide by Toho in 420 theaters in Japan on November 11 through regular and IMAX screenings. Midnight screenings were held in 11 theaters across six cities in Japan. The film premiered internationally in competition at the 73rd Berlin International Film Festival on February 23, 2023, marking the first time an anime film competed in the festival since Spirited Away in 2002.

In Asia, the film began screening on March 2, 2023, in Hong Kong, Taiwan, and Macau; March 8 in Indonesia, the Philippines, and South Korea; March 9 in Malaysia and Singapore; March 10 in Vietnam; March 16 in Brunei; March 24 in China; April 13 in Thailand; and April 21 in India. Singapore-based distributor Encore Films handled distribution in Southeast Asia, with the Philippines and Thailand releases co-distributed with Warner Bros. Pictures.

In May 2022, Crunchyroll, Sony Pictures, and Wild Bunch International acquired the film's global distribution rights. Crunchyroll handled distribution in North America and partnered with Sony Pictures Releasing in territories outside of Asia under the Sony Pictures Releasing International banner, while Sony and Wild Bunch co-distributed in Europe. A special screening for the film was held on March 1, 2023, at the BFI Southbank in London, with Shinkai himself attending the event. The film had its North American premiere at the New York International Children's Film Festival on March 5. Another special screening was held on April 21, 2023, at PVR Cinemas Citi Mall in Mumbai, which Shinkai attended to celebrate the premiere of the film in Japanese and in the Hindi dub in India. He interacted with media outlets along with his overseas fans and attended a Q&A session. He also participated in a signing event along with Denki Amashima, the illustrator for the manga adaptation. This was his second visit to India; he previously visited the country during the premiere of his film Weathering With You in 2019.

Suzume began its general screening on April 12, 2023, in France, Malta, and Switzerland; April 13 in Argentina, Armenia, Australia, Azerbaijan, Bolivia, Brazil, Central America, Chile, Denmark, Ecuador, Georgia, Germany, Greece, Hungary, Israel, Kazakhstan, Kyrgyzstan, Mexico, the Netherlands, New Zealand, Peru, Slovakia, Tajikistan, Turkey, Uruguay, Uzbekistan and Venezuela; April 14 in Austria, Belgium, Canada, Estonia, Gibraltar, Ireland, Kenya, Latvia, Lithuania, Luxembourg, Norway, Southern Africa, Spain, Sweden, the United Kingdom, and the United States; April 20 in Colombia and Portugal; April 21 in Bulgaria, Finland, Poland, and Romania; April 27 in Italy, Kuwait, Qatar, Saudi Arabia, and the United Arab Emirates; April 30 in Iceland; May 25 in Croatia, Serbia, Bosnia and Herzegovina, Kosovo, North Macedonia and Albania; and May 26 in Czech Republic and Madagascar.

In Australia, Canada, Ireland, New Zealand, the United Kingdom, and the United States, an English-language dub was screened along with the original Japanese version.

=== Home media ===
Suzume was released on Blu-ray and DVD in Japan on September 20, 2023, and includes English and Chinese-language subtitles. The collector's edition features a 4K Ultra HD Blu-ray and bonus content such as audio commentary, a making-of documentary, animatics of the film, and interviews with cast and staff members. The film was broadcast on Nippon TV's Kin'yō Road Show block on April 5, 2024, serving as its premiere on Japanese terrestrial television.

Internationally, Crunchyroll began streaming the film on November 16, 2023. It was followed by a Blu-ray and DVD release in North America on March 12, 2024, and in the United Kingdom on April 1. The film was also released on Netflix on April 5 in selected countries.

== Reception ==
=== Box office ===
Suzume grossed US$315 million worldwide, including ¥14.94 billion in Japan. It became the fourth-highest-grossing anime film worldwide at the time of its release. The film debuted at number one at the Japanese box office, and grossed ¥1.88 billion (US$13.49 million) from the advance IMAX screening and during its first three days. It surpassed Weathering with You to become the biggest three-day opening for a Shinkai film. In Japan, Suzume became the fourth-highest-grossing film of 2022, and it ended its theatrical run as the country's eight-highest-grossing anime film and the 14th-overall highest-grossing film.

In China, the film topped the box office and grossed US$49.6 million in its opening weekend. It earned US$82.27 million within its first ten days. It surpassed the box office of Your Name and became the highest-grossing Japanese film in the country. Suzume ultimately grossed US$114 million, becoming the second-highest-grossing foreign film of 2023.

In South Korea, the film debuted with US$5.71 million in its opening weekend, topping the box office. It was the highest-grossing film for 35 consecutive days after its release, setting a record second only to Avatar (2009). By April 14, 2023, the film grossed US$35.78 million and had attracted a total of over 4.48 million viewers, surpassing The First Slam Dunk (2022) to become the highest-grossing and most-watched Japanese film in the country. Suzume grossed US$43.6 million, ranking second among the highest-grossing foreign films of 2023. It also became the first Japanese film to have sold over 5 million tickets.

In the United States, the film was released alongside Renfield, The Pope's Exorcist, Mafia Mamma and Sweetwater, and was projected to gross $4.7 million from 2,170 theaters in its opening weekend. It made $2.15 million on its first day, as well as $680,000 from Thursday preview screenings. The film went to debut on $5 million in its opening weekend, finishing seventh at the box office behind Dungeons & Dragons: Honor Among Thieves, Renfield, John Wick: Chapter IV, Air and The Super Mario Bros. Movie. By May 2023, Suzume earned $10 million at the box office.

=== Critical response ===
On the review aggregator website Rotten Tomatoes, 96% of 137 critics' reviews are positive, with rated reviews having an average of 7.9/10. The website's consensus reads: "Suzume sees director Makoto Shinkai falling just a bit short of the bar set by previous outings – but when the results are this visually thrilling and emotionally impactful, it's hard to find much fault." Metacritic, which uses a weighted average, assigned the film a score of 77 out of 100, based on 27 critics, indicating "generally favorable" reviews. Audiences polled by PostTrak gave the film an 89% positive score, with 72% saying they would recommend it.

On Japanese review site Filmarks, Suzume received an average rating of 4.00/5 based on 6,585 user reviews, placing second in its first-day satisfaction ranking. Matt Schley of The Japan Times gave the film 4 out of 5 stars, and called it "the director's most satisfying work yet." He praised the art and animation, and while he described some of the dialogue as "cliche or cringe-worthy", he also felt that the film was "a bit more mature" than Shinkai's past films. Schley also found the film's climax "somewhat disturbing", and said that it might divide viewers on whether Shinkai "earns" it. Richard Eisenbeis, writing for Anime News Network, graded the film "A", praising the story, characters, animation, and music, but found the plot structure to be similar to Your Name and Weathering with You, making the film "more predictable." Eisenbeis also criticized the appearance of a creature that Suzume encountered in Tokyo, describing it as "a cheap CG effect placed over the otherwise quality animation and blended poorly." Gautam Sunder of The Hindu praised Shinkai's "mastery over light and shadows", character writing, humour, and references to older animated films, while conceding that it could not match "the raw beauty of The Garden of Words or the dramatic beats of Your Name".

=== Accolades ===
Accolades received by Suzume
Award	Date of ceremony	Category	Recipient(s)	Result	Ref.
AnimaniA Awards	August 2, 2024	Best Movie: Cinematic Release	Suzume	Won	
AnimaniA Awards	August 2, 2024	Best Anime Song	"Suzume" (by Radwimps featuring Toaka)	Won	
AnimaniA Awards	August 1, 2025	Best Movie: Disc Release	Suzume	Won	
Annie Awards	February 17, 2024	Best Feature	Suzume	Nominated	
Annie Awards	February 17, 2024	Best FX – Feature	Yoshitaka Takeuchi and Hiroyuki Seshita	Nominated	
Annie Awards	February 17, 2024	Best Character Animation – Feature	Kenichi Tsuchiya	Nominated	
Annie Awards	February 17, 2024	Best Music – Feature	Radwimps and Kazuma Jinnouchi	Nominated	
Annie Awards	February 17, 2024	Best Storyboarding – Feature	Makoto Shinkai	Nominated	
Annie Awards	February 17, 2024	Best Voice Acting – Feature	Hokuto Matsumura (as Souta Munakata)	Nominated	
Annie Awards	February 17, 2024	Best Writing – Feature	Makoto Shinkai	Nominated	
Asia Pacific Screen Awards	November 3, 2023	Best Animated Feature Film	Suzume	Nominated	
Astra Film Awards	January 6, 2024	Best Animated Feature	Suzume	Nominated	
Austin Film Critics Association	January 10, 2024	Best Animated Film	Suzume	Nominated	
Berlin International Film Festival	February 25, 2023	Golden Bear	Suzume	Nominated	
Brussels International Fantastic Film Festival	April 23, 2023	Silver Raven (International Competition)	Suzume	Won (Note: Shared with Infinity Pool.)	
Celebration of Cinema and Television	December 4, 2023	International Animation Award	Makoto Shinkai	Won	
Crunchyroll Anime Awards	March 2, 2024	Best Film	Suzume	Won	
Crunchyroll Anime Awards	March 2, 2024	Best Anime Song	"Suzume" (by Radwimps featuring Toaka)	Nominated	
Crunchyroll Anime Awards	March 2, 2024	Best Score	Radwimps and Kazuma Jinnouchi	Nominated	
Crunchyroll Anime Awards	March 2, 2024	Best Voice Artist Performance (Spanish)	Nycolle González (as Suzume Iwato)	Nominated	
Crunchyroll Anime Awards	March 2, 2024	Best Voice Artist Performance (German)	Emilia Raschewski (as Suzume Iwato)	Nominated	
Crunchyroll Anime Awards	March 2, 2024	Best Voice Artist Performance (French)	Levanah Solomon (as Suzume Iwato)	Nominated	
Florida Film Critics Circle	December 21, 2023	Best Animated Film	Suzume	Nominated	
Golden Globe Awards	January 7, 2024	Best Animated Feature Film	Suzume	Nominated	
Hochi Film Awards	December 22, 2022	Best Animated Picture	Suzume	Nominated	
Indiana Film Journalists Association	December 17, 2023	Best Foreign Language Film	Suzume	Nominated	
Indiana Film Journalists Association	December 17, 2023	Best Animated Film	Suzume	Nominated	
International Cinephile Society	February 10, 2024	Best Animated Film	Suzume	Nominated	
Japan Academy Film Prize	March 10, 2023	Animation of the Year	Suzume	Nominated	
Japan Academy Film Prize	March 10, 2023	Outstanding Achievement in Music	Radwimps and Kazuma Jinnouchi	Won	
London Film Critics' Circle	February 4, 2024	Animated Film of the Year	Suzume	Nominated	
Mainichi Film Awards	February 14, 2023	Best Animation Film	Suzume	Nominated	
Mainichi Film Awards	February 14, 2023	Ōfuji Noburō Award	Suzume	Nominated	
Newtype Anime Awards	October 28, 2023	Best Picture Award – Theatrical Work	Suzume	2nd place	
NexTone Awards	April 24, 2025	International Award	Suzume	Won	
Paris Film Critics Awards	February 4, 2024	Best Animated Film	Suzume	Nominated	
Satellite Awards	March 3, 2024	Best Animated or Mixed Media Feature	Suzume	Nominated	
Saturn Awards	February 4, 2024	Best Animated Film	Suzume	Nominated	
Seattle Film Critics Society	January 8, 2024	Best Animated Feature	Suzume	Nominated	
Seiun Awards	August 5, 2023	Best Media	Suzume	Nominated	
World Soundtrack Awards	October 21, 2023	Discovery of the Year	Radwimps and Kazuma Jinnouchi	Nominated	

== Adaptations ==
- Suzume
- Novel
- Written by: Makoto Shinkai
- Published by: Kadokawa
- English publisher: NA: Yen Press
- Imprint: Kadokawa Bunko
- Published: August 24, 2022
- Manga
- Written by: Makoto Shinkai
- Illustrated by: Denki Amashima
- Published by: Kodansha
- English publisher: NA: Kodansha USA
- Imprint: Afternoon KC
- Magazine: Monthly Afternoon
- Original run: October 25, 2022 – December 25, 2023
- Volumes: 3
- icon

=== Novel ===
A novel adaptation written by Shinkai was released on August 24, 2022, under the Kadokawa Bunko imprint. A portion of the novel was included in a booklet distributed during the 2022 Kadobun Summer Fair, which was held in Japanese bookstores on June 10. A children's paperback edition, which adds furigana and illustrations drawn by Chiko, was released on October 13 under the Kadokawa Tsubasa Bunko imprint. The novel was the best-selling physical light novel volume of 2022 in Japan, and had sold over 369,000 copies by May 2023. In January 2023, Yen Press announced that it licensed the series for English publication in digital and print formats.

==== Chapters ====
No.	Title	Original release date	English release date
	Suzume; Shōsetsu Suzume no Tojimari (Japanese: 小説 すずめの戸締まり)	August 24, 2022; 978-4-04-112679-0	December 12, 2023; 978-1-9753-7306-1
Day One (一日目, Ichi Nichime); "The Place I Go in My Dreams" (夢で、いつも行く場所, Yume de, Itsumo Iku Basho); "A Person like a Beautiful Landscape" (そういう景色のように、美しい人, Sōiu Keshiki no Yōni, Utsukushii Hito); "Things That Only We Can See" (私たちにしか見えないもの, Watashitachi ni Shika Mienai Mono); "It's Starting, the World Whispers" (さあ始まるよと、皆がささやく, Sā Hajimaru yo to, Mina ga Sasayaku); Day Two (二日目, Ni Nichime); "Searching for a Cat in Ehime" (愛媛での猫探, Ehime de no Neko Sagu); "The Direction I Need to Run In Now" (だからいま、私たちが走るべき方向は, Dakara Ima, Watashitachi ga Hashiru Beki Hōkō wa); "Thanks to You, I'm a Magician" (あなたのせいで魔法使いに, Anata no Sei de Mahōtsukai ni); Day Three (三日目, San Nichime); "Crossing the Strait" (海峡を渡る, Kaikyō o Wataru); "The Four of Us Make Some Memories" (思い出は四人で, Omoide wa Yonin de); "A Door You Can't Enter and a Place You're Not Supposed to Go" (入れない扉、行くべきではない場所, Irenai Tobira, Iku Beki de wa Nai Basho); "A Nighttime Party and a Lonely Dream" (夜のパーティーと、孤独な夢, Yoru no Pātī to, Kodokuna Yume); Day Four (四日目, Yon Nichime); "Scenery You Can See but Cannot Be a Part of" (見えるけれど、関われない風景たち, Mieru Keredo, Kakawarenai Fūkeitachi); "A Room like a Garden" (庭のような部屋, Niwa no Yōna Heya); "If the Plug Was Pulled from the Sky" (空の栓が抜けたとしたら, Sora no Sen ga Nuketa to Shitara); "Never Again" (もう二度と, Mō Nidoto); Day Five (五日目, Go Nichime); "The Only Door You Can Enter" (あなたが入れる唯一のドアは, Anata ga Ireru Yuiitsu no Doa wa); "Departure" (出発, Shuppatsu); "What Are You Searching for?" (探しものは何ですか, Sagashi Mono wa Nani Desu ka); "Enter the Minister of the Left" (サダイジン登場, Sadaijin Tōjō); "What They Want Me to Do" (してほしいこと, Shite Hoshii Koto); "Hometown" (故郷, Kokyō); Ever-After (常世, Tokoyo); "The Town That Is Still Burning" (まだ、燃えている町, Mada, Moeteiru Machi); "The Whole of Time" (ぜんぶの時間, Zenbu no Jikan); Day Six and Recollections (六日目と後日談, Roku Nichime to Gojitsudan); "The Words No One Got to Say" (あの日の言葉を, Ano Hi no Kotoba o); Afterword (あとがき, Atogaki)

=== Manga ===
A manga adaptation illustrated by Denki Amashima was serialized in Kodansha's seinen manga magazine Monthly Afternoon from October 25, 2022, to December 25, 2023. Three tankōbon volumes were released from March 23, 2023, to February 22, 2024. In March 2024, Kodansha USA licensed the series for English publication; three volumes were released from September 24, 2024, to January 28, 2025.

==== Volumes ====
No.	Original release date	Original ISBN	English release date	English ISBN
1	March 23, 2023	978-4-06-530880-6	September 24, 2024	979-8-89478-132-7 (digital); 978-1-64729-404-5 (print)
1. "The Place I Go in My Dreams" (夢で、いつも行く場所, Yume de, Itsumo Iku Basho); 2. "Setting Sail" (船出, Funade); 3. "My Next Destination" (だからいま、私が走るべき方向は, Dakara Ima, Watashi ga Hashiru Beki Hōkō wa); 4. "The Night I Became a Witch" (魔法使いになった夜, Mahōtsukai ni Natta Yoru); 5. "Across the Bridge" (海峡を渡る, Kaikyō o Wataru)
2	September 22, 2023	978-4-06-532975-7	November 19, 2024	979-8-89478-256-0 (digital); 978-1-64729-409-0 (print)
6. "The Door Beyond Reach" (入れない扉, Irenai Tobira); 7. "To Each Their Own Duty" (それぞれの役目, Sorezore no Yakume); 8. "The Smell of Books" (図書館の匂いのする部屋, Toshokan no Nioi no Suru Heya); 9. "What If a Hole Opened in the Sky?" (空の栓が抜けたとしたら, Sora no Sen ga Nuketa to Shitara); 10. "The Tokyo Gate" (東京の後ろ戸, Tōkyō no Ushiro To)
3	February 22, 2024	978-4-06-534603-7	January 28, 2025	979-8-89478-358-1 (digital); 978-1-64729-410-6 (print)
11. "Setting Off Again" (再出発, Sai Shuppatsu); 12. "Middle-of-the-Road Family" (道半ばの家族, Michi Nakaba no Kazoku); 13. "A Trip Home" (里帰り, Satogaeri); 14. "A City on Fire" (燃える街, Moeru Machi); 15. "Words from the Past" (あの日の言葉, Ano Hi no Kotoba)
