= Case Closed: The Bride of Halloween =

- Theatrical release poster
- Kanji: 名探偵コナン ハロウィンの花嫁
- Directed by: Susumu Mitsunaka
- Written by: Takahiro Okura
- Based on: Case Closed by Gosho Aoyama
- Starring: Minami Takayama; Kappei Yamaguchi; Rikiya Koyama; Wakana Yamazaki; Megumi Hayashibara; Atsuko Yuya; Wataru Takagi; Tōru Furuya; Nobutoshi Canna; Hikaru Midorikawa; Hiroki Tōchi; Shin-ichiro Miki; Mai Shiraishi; Nobuo Tobita; Kenichi Ogata; Naoko Matsui; Yukiko Iwai; Ikue Ōtani; Chafurin
- Music by: Yugo Kanno (soundtrack); Bump of Chicken (theme song: "Chronostasis")
- Production company: TMS/Studio 1
- Distributed by: Toho
- Release date: April 15, 2022
- Running time: 111 minutes
- Country: Japan
- Language: Japanese
- Box office: $92.05 million (Worldwide)

Case Closed: The Bride of Halloween, known as Detective Conan: The Bride of Halloween (Japanese: 名探偵コナン ハロウィンの花嫁, Hepburn: Meitantei Konan Harowin no Hanayome) in Japan, is a 2022 Japanese animated mystery film directed by Susumu Mitsunaka. It is the twenty-fifth installment of the Case Closed film series based on the manga series of the same name by Gosho Aoyama, following the 2021 film The Scarlet Bullet. The film was released in Japan on April 15, 2022.

== Plot ==
Former MPD superintendent Tsutomu Muranaka, set to marry his fiancée Christine Richard, receives a death threat. With police protection ensured, the police attempt to practice fighting against any threats that would happen during the wedding. Meanwhile, while chasing a serial bomber that has escaped custody, Yuya Kazami is knocked unconscious. While Rei Furuya tries to assist him, a bomb is attached to his neck. The next day, while visiting the MPD headquarters, Kogoro, Ran, Conan, and the Detective Boys come across a man holding a tablet that explodes, with Kogoro being injured while trying to protect Haibara. Conan later meets with Rei, and learns that the explosion is possibly related to an attempted bombing incident that Rei and his classmates - Morofushi, Matsuda, and Date - had prevented years ago.

Afterwards, Ran, Conan, and the Detective Boys are invited to Shibuya for location scouting for the wedding, set to take place during the Halloween festival. Christine receives a message that tells her to retrieve something, but she and Muranaka are set to have a meeting soon, so she lets the Detective Boys take the gift for her. However, when they reach the area, they find the same bomb that Rei had defused 3 years earlier and narrowly escape just as it explodes. Meanwhile, Detective Chiba is kidnapped by an unknown perpetrator, who demands to meet Detective Matsuda, not knowing that Matsuda has died 3 years ago. Detective Takagi disguises himself as Matsuda and meets with the perpetrator, who reveals herself as Elenica Lavrentyeva, the leader of Nado Unichtozit, a civilian group focusing on capturing the bomber Plamya, responsible for the bomb on Rei's neck. Elenica reveals that the hostage found during the bombing incident years ago was her brother, who had escaped with the help of Matsuda and stole a tablet from Plamya, only to be killed in front of the MPD headquarters.

The police infiltrate the area and the Nado Unichtozit members escape. Later, Christine, who considers cancelling the wedding, receives a message that forces her to hold it instead. Christine and Muranaka have the ceremony in private. With Ran's help, Conan notices a pattern of the enclosed Shibuya roads for the festival that matches the paper Elenica's brother was holding during the time of his death, and thus deduces that Muranaka might be Plamya. Conan works with Nado Unichtozit to infiltrate the wedding, only for Christine to be revealed as Plamya instead - she had led the Detective Boys to the bomb-filled building, brought the Nado Unichtozit members to Japan, and rigged the entire Shibuya festival area with the two liquids used in the bombs which, upon interaction, would create a huge explosion. Christine attempts to escape on a helicopter, but Rei, who has managed to defuse the bomb on his neck with aid from Kazami, intercepts her and blows up the helicopter, fighting her as it crashes onto the ground below.

Muranaka knocks Christine unconscious, while Conan convinces Elenica to not murder Christine. Conan, the Detective Boys, and all the members of Nado Unichtozit work together to use a huge inflatable ball to block both liquids from interacting, thus preventing the explosion that would destroy Shibuya. Christine is arrested, the liquids are cleaned from the streets, and Muranaka promises Elenica that Christine will get the justice she deserves.

== Cast ==
Character	Japanese voice actor
Conan Edogawa	Minami Takayama
Ran Mōri	Wakana Yamazaki
Kogorō Mōri	Rikiya Koyama
Shinichi Kudō	Kappei Yamaguchi
Hiroshi Agasa	Kenichi Ogata
Ai Haibara	Megumi Hayashibara
Ayumi Yoshida	Yukiko Iwai
Mitsuhiko Tsuburaya	Ikue Ōtani
Genta Kojima	Wataru Takagi
Wataru Takagi	Wataru Takagi
Juzo Megure	Chafurin
Miwako Sato	Atsuko Yuya
Yūya Kazami	Nobuo Tobita
Rei Furuya	Tōru Furuya
Hiromitsu Morofushi	Hikaru Midorikawa
Jinpei Matsuda	Nobutoshi Canna
Wataru Date	Hiroki Tōchi
Kenji Hagiwara	Shin-ichiro Miki
Elenica Lavrentyeva	Mai Shiraishi

== Box office ==
Detective Conan: The Bride of Halloween debuted at no. 1 in its first weekend, with a sell of about 1,321,944 tickets in its first three days.

Here is a table which shows the box office of this movie of all the weekends in Japan:

Weekend no.	Rank	Weekend gross	Total gross till current weekend	Ref.
1	1	¥1,886 billion (US$15.06 million)	¥1,907 billion (US$16.85 million)	
2	1	¥894 million (US$6.98 million)	¥3,648 billion (US$28.5 million)	
3	1	¥734.8 million (US$5.65 million)	¥5,230 billion (US$40.24 million)	
4	1	¥396.9 million (US$3.05 million)	¥6,968 billion (US$53.57 million)	
5	2	¥299.5 million (US$2.31 million)	¥7,544 billion (US$58.40 million)	
6	3	¥237.7 million (US$1.86 million)	¥7,992 billion (US$62.54 million)	

Detective Conan: The Bride of Halloween on its eleventh weekend (25-26 June) still managed to remain in Top 10 at 10th Rank with total admissions reaches upto 6,478,540 with total gross of ¥9,029,251,300 ($66.79 million). On its 13th Weekend, Bride of Halloween dropped out of Top 10 but still managed to earn 34,587,050 yen (about US$252,000) with cumulative total of 9,164,972,550 yen ($66.82 Million).

=== Other territories ===
In China, the film's Opening Takes China Box Office to ¥4 Billion ($11.7 millions) Annual Total. after that the movie fell to second place, adding ¥1.8 million for a three weekend total of $19.4 million.

== Release ==
Detective Conan: The Bride of Halloween was premiered on May 13–16 and was set to air officially on May 26 in Thailand, but later changed to May 25. It was released in Singapore and Malaysia on June 2, 2022, It was also released in Spain on July 8, 2022, South Korea on July 13, 2022, Indonesia on July 20, 2022, and Vietnam on July 22, 2022.

The movie was shown in Philippine cinemas in July 2023.

The film made its North American premiere at the 2024 Anime NYC convention in New York City on August 24, 2024, and was released on digital platforms in North America the following day with an English dub.
