= Canana Films =

Mexican film production company

- Type: Private
- Genre: Films
- Founded: 2005
- Founder: Diego Luna; Gael García Bernal; Pablo Cruz
- Headquarters: Mexico City, Mexico
- Website: canana.net

Canana Films is a Mexican film and television production company and former distributor. Founded in 2005, Canana is focused on Latin American-focused projects in Spanish and English and became one of Mexico's leading producer-distributors during the late 2000s/early 2010s. Canana has been inactive since 2020.

Among their best known productions are Cary Joji Fukunaga's Sin nombre (2009), the action thriller Miss Bala (2011) and its 2019 American adaptation, the Oscar-nominated drama No (2012), the comedy Rudo y Cursi (2006), and the biopic Cesar Chavez (2014).

== Profile ==
Canana was founded in 2005 by Mexican actors Gael García Bernal and Diego Luna and producer Pablo Cruz. García Bernal and Luna departed the company in 2018, with Cruz and Arturo Sampson providing leadership. García Bernal and Luna subsequently founded their studio La Corriente del Golfo. Cruz went on to co-found the international production studio El Estudio in 2020.

In 2005, they partnered with Focus Features for worldwide film rights. Beginning in 2007, Canana began distributing films in Mexico focusing on both promoting Mexican and international independent film around the country. The company "pioneered upscale VOD, genre pic and indie 3D movie distribution in Mexico."

2010 was an important year for Canana: they produced their first commercial hit, Abel directed by Luna, and significantly ramped up their film distribution. That same year, it joined Golden Phoenix Productions to jointly produce a number of television documentaries about the unsolved murders of around three hundred women in the border city of Ciudad Juárez. In 2011, they made their first big television deal with Netflix picking up their original series Soy tu fan.

In 2012, a new global deal was made with IM Global, launching the joint venture Mundial to promote worldwide sales of Latin American movies. In 2013, Canana joined Participant Media's five-year production deal Participant PanAmerica; their first project was the film No starring García Bernal which was nominated for the Best Foreign Language Film Oscar. Also in 2013, the company launch a branded content division.

Canana has had multiple collaborations with directors like Mariana Chenillo and Gerardo Naranjo, among others.

== Filmography ==
Adapted from company website and IMDb.

=== Films ===
- Dance of the 41 (Netflix; 2020)
- Miss Bala (2019)
- Zama (2017)
- Salt and Fire (2016)
- Mr. Pig (2016)
- The Chosen Ones (2016)
- Eva Doesn't Sleep (2015)
- Sand Dollars (2014)
- The Ardor (2014)
- César Chávez (2014)
- Carmita (2013)
- The Well (2013)
- La última película (2013)
- Paradise (2013)
- Who is Dayani Cristal? (2013)
- Come Out and Play (2012)
- No (2012)
- Verdaderamente Durazo (2011)
- Jean Gentil (2010)
- 18 cigarrillos y medio (2010)
- Post Mortem (2010)
- Cefalópodo (2010)
- Revolución (2010)
- Abel (2010)
- Sin Nombre (2009)
- Rudo y Cursi (2008)
- Just Walking (2008)
- I'm Gonna Explode (2008)
- Cochochi (2007)
- Déficit (2007)
- El búfalo de la noche (2007)
- J.C. Chávez (2007)
- Drama/Mex (2006)

=== Short films ===
- Nana (2015)
- Drifting (2013)
- Puente Baluarte (2013)
- Los Invisibles (2010)
- Samantha (2010)

=== Television ===
- Taco Chronicles (Netflix; 2019–2020)
- Luis Miguel: The Series (Netflix/Telemundo; 2018–2021)
- Niño Santo (Once TV; 2011–014)
- Alguien Más (Once TV; 2013)
- Fronteras (TNT Latin America; 2011)
- Soy tu fan (Once TV/MTV Latin America; 2010–2012)
- Back Home (2013)
- Ruta 32 (2006)

== Film distribution ==
Canana distributed a number of international films to Mexican theaters, particularly during the late 2000s. List adapted from the company website and IMDb.

- I Am Not Your Negro (2016) – United States
- All Is Lost (2013) – United States
- Gloria (2013) – Chile
- The Empty Hours (2013) – Mexico
- The Life After (2013) – Mexico
- We Are What We Are (2013) – United States
- Workers (2013) – Mexico
- Never Die (2012) – Mexico
- The Hunt (2012) – Denmark
- No quiero dormir sola (2012) – Mexico
- A Glimpse Inside the Mind of Charles Swan III (2012) – United States
- Searching for Sugarman (2012)
- The Loneliest Planet (2011) – Germany/United States
- Juan de los muertos (2011) – Cuba
- Pina (2011) – Germany
- Monsieur Lazhar (2011) – Canada
- The Prize (2011) – Germany
- Cheburashka (2010) – Russia
- We Are What We Are (2010) – Mexico
- Cave of Forgotten Dreams (2010) – Canada
- The Robber (2010) – Germany
- Exit Through the Gift Shop (2010) – United States/United Kingdom
- Año bisiesto (2010) – Mexico
- Seguir siendo: Café Tacvba (2010) – Mexico
- The Loved Ones (2009) – Australia
- Lebanon (2009) – Israel
- The Horde (2009) – France
- Rompecabezas (2009) – Argentina
- The Loved Ones (2009) – Australia
- Ajami (2009) – Israel
- The White Ribbon (2009) – Germany/Austria
- Same Same but Different (2009) – Germany
- Castaway on the Moon (2009) – South Korea
- Fish Tank (2009) – United Kingdom
- Thirst (2009) – South Korea
- The Toledo Report (2009) – Mexico
- The Milk of Sorrow (2009) – Peru
- Coming Soon (2008) – Thailand
- Troubled Water (2008) – Norway
- La vida loca (2008) – El Salvador
- Food, Inc. (2008) – United States
- Tony Manero (2008) – Chile
- Gomorrah (2008) – Italy
- Let the Right One In (2008) – Sweden
- Man on Wire (2008) – United States
- Sunshine Cleaning (2008) – United States
- My Life Inside (2007) – Mexico
- Joy Division (2007) – United Kingdom
- Mister Lonely (2007) – United Kingdom
- Used Parts (2007) – Mexico
- Year of the Nail (2007) – Mexico
- The Big Sellout (2007) – Germany
- Cocalero (2007) – Argentina
- The Signal (2007) – United States
- Familia tortuga (2006) – Mexico
- The Violin (2005) – Mexico
