= Lock the Gate Alliance =

Australian community action group

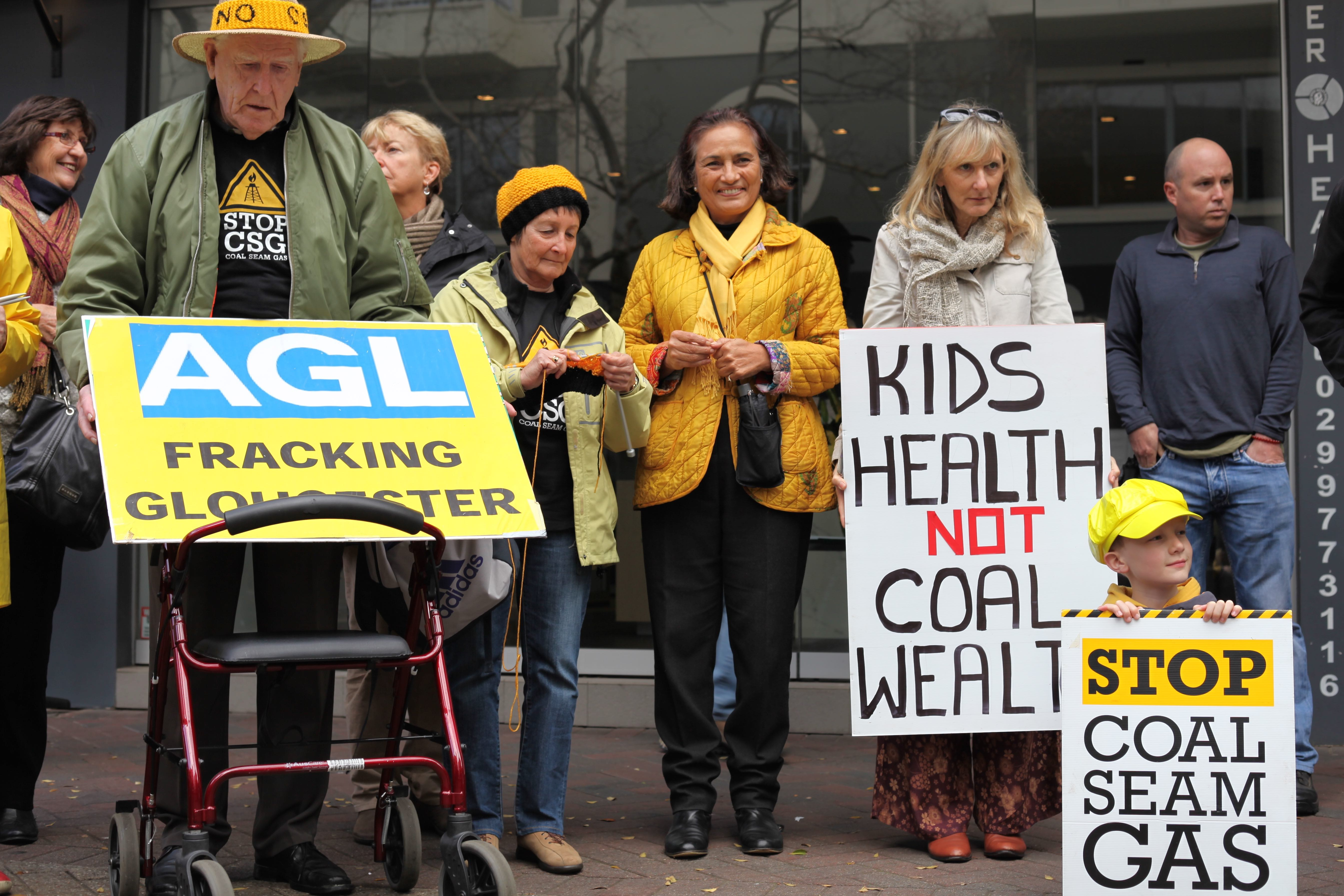
Petition delivery in Sydney, 2015

The Lock the Gate Alliance is an incorporated Australian community action group which was formed in 2010 in response to the expansion of the coal mining and coal seam gas industries, which were encroaching on agricultural land, rural communities and environmentally sensitive areas. The organisation has initially focused on responding to developments in the states of Queensland and New South Wales, through peaceful protest and noncooperation.

Lock the Gate Alliance's stated mission is "to protect Australia’s natural, environmental, cultural and agricultural resources from inappropriate mining and to educate and empower all Australians to demand sustainable solutions to food and energy production." The organisation features in the media regularly and lobbies government for stronger protections for productive agricultural land, groundwater resources and catchment areas.

Lock the Gate has not successfully impacted coal seam gas in Queensland but has obstructed the development of the coal seam gas industry in New South Wales.

== Support and opposition ==
Over 120,000 members and 450 local groups constitute the alliance including farmers, traditional custodians, conservationists and urban residents. The organisation was incorporated in 2011 in New South Wales and became a registered company, limited by guarantee on 6 March 2012. The inaugural AGM was held in Murwillumbah on 11 June 2011 at which Drew Hutton was elected president. Another notable member is Dayne Pratzky, whose activism became the subject of the 2015 documentary film, Frackman.

Lock the Gate's supporter base includes notable individuals from across the political spectrum, including former Greens party leader Bob Brown and conservative 2GB radio personality, Alan Jones. Despite the diverse political backgrounds and regional distribution of its member base, the Lock the Gate Alliance's opponents have labelled them a "green" group and suggested that their membership is urban and anti-development. In 2015, an editorial in Queensland's Courier Mail said of the group: "The mindless demonisation of industries that offer the chance to ensure the continuing prosperity of Queensland – and therefore Queenslanders – does nobody any favours."

== History ==
On 21 June 2017, Drew Hutton announced his resignation as the president of the Lock the Gate Alliance via Facebook. In the post Hutton noted that he "made this decision with great sadness but I have serious, chronic health issues that simply won't allow me to do what is needed in such a position". Hundreds of tributes to his work and dedication followed this announcement.

The organisation claimed several successes in 2014, including the cancellation of 35,000,000 hectares (86,000,000 acres) of gas licence applications, the extension of a moratorium on drilling in the state of Victoria, the declaration of 280 mining-free communities across Australia and the perpetuation of the water trigger requirement in Federal environmental approvals under the EPBC Act. The alliance supported campaigners in Bentley (NSW), Broome (WA), Gloucester (NSW), Seaspray (VIC), Maules Creek (NSW), Borroloola (NT), Narrabri (NSW) and Tara (QLD).

== Funding and Resources ==
According to financial statements lodged with the Australian Charities and Not-for-profits Commission (ACNC), Lock the Gate Alliance reported total revenue of approximately $4.5 million in 2025, an increase from $4.38 million in 2024 and $3.8 million in 2023. It is funded by grants, donations and receives in-kind support. In 2025, revenue comprised $3.39 million in grants and $1.01 million in donations, with smaller amounts from interest income and merchandise sales. Lock the Gate received approximately $415,000 of Australian Government JobKeeper subsidies over 2020 and 2021. Lock the Gate also declared 35 employees in 2025.

Historically, the organisation has received philanthropic funding from Australian and international donors. Notable donors include Kjerulf Ainsworth, who during the two years prior to October 2012 contributed approximately $200,000 towards fund legal, travel and other expenses for Drew Hutton, to screen the documentary film Gasland in over 80 country towns and to fund activist Dayne Pratzky. Another notable donor is the American-based political body “Tides foundation” who declared funding of $160,000 in 2013 and $275,000 in 2012 to Lock the Gate. According to forms lodged to the Australian Charities and Not-for-profits Commission (ACNC), a large proportion of Lock the Gate’s funding has come from undisclosed sources. For instance, in 2015 Lock the Gate received $823,000 from an undisclosed source. In 2023 Lock the Gate received $2.6 million from undisclosed grants.

The Lock the Gate Alliance is listed on the Australian Government's Register of Environmental Organisations which provides them with a range of tax concessions, including the ability to receive tax-deductible gifts and contributions. This has attracted criticism from industry groups and (particularly) Senator Matt Canavan. They claim this deduction should not be available to “aggressive activist groups”. The mining industry in particular have claimed that Lock the Gate are collecting tax breaks and should be stripped of their charity donation status. Legal experts from the Adelaide University Law School, however, warned that any move to narrow the definition of what constitutes an "environmental organisation" – and strip them of their charitable status as a result - would represent an "attack on Australian democracy".

== Documentary films ==
The Lock the Gate Alliance regularly publishes videos via YouTube. It has produced two documentary films and has featured prominently in another. The organisation uses video to inform viewers of the implications of expanding gas and mining activities in sensitive areas, document and broadcast their activities, celebrate their achievements and to draw attention to their organisation and cause.

=== Undermining Australia (2013) ===
Undermining Australia - Coal vs. Communities (2013) was written directed and edited by David Lowe. Some of the interviews were conducted by Richard Todd, who also contributed footage to the film while working on the feature documentary, Frackman.

=== Fractured Country (2013) ===
Fractured Country - An unconventional invasion (2013) was directed, shot and edited by Brendan Shoebridge. It was narrated by actor Jack Thompson, and featured footage from many sources, including Richard Todd, Dayne Pratzky and documentary filmmaker David Bradbury.

=== Frackman (2015) ===
Drew Hutton, Dayne Pratzky and some of Lock the Gate's events and demonstrations feature in the 2015 documentary film Frackman. The film was directed by Richard Todd and Jonathan Stack and produced by production company, Smith & Nasht.

== See also ==
- Coal in Australia
