= Trish Lake =

Australian film producer

Trish Lake is an Australian producer of feature films and documentaries and former ABC TV journalist. Among her works are Gettin' Square (2003), The Burning Season (2008) and Frackman (2015). She is the CEO of Freshwater Pictures, based in Brisbane, Queensland, which she founded in 2001. Lake was National President of the Screen Producer’s Association of Australia – SPAA from 2005 - 2008 and is a former recipient of the SPAA Feature Film Producer of the Year award. Lake is an Adjunct Fellow at Griffith University, Brisbane where she leads a mentoring program for emerging producers at the Griffith Film School. Lake has been an advisor to the Breath of Fresh Air Film Festival (BOFA) in Tasmania since its inception, and has been the event's artistic director since 2012. She has collaborated professionally with her nephew Daniel (Dan) Lake on many productions. Dan Lake left Freshwater Pictures in November 2014 to take on a position as a director of production investment at Screen Queensland.

== Filmography ==
Title	Year	Form	Director(s)	Other Producers
Early Winter	2015	Feature drama	Michael Rowe	Serge Noël
Frackman	2015	Feature documentary	Richard Todd	Simon Nasht
Show me the magic	2013	Feature documentary	Cathy Henkel	
My America	2012	Feature documentary	Peter Hegedus	
Subdivision	2009	Feature Comedy	Sue Brooks	
The Burning Season	2008	Feature documentary	Cathy Henkel	Cathy Henkel
Gettin' Square	2003	Feature		
