= Frackman =

- Directed by: Richard Todd, Jonathan Stack
- Written by: Sarah Rossetti, Jonathan Stack, John Collee
- Produced by: Richard Todd, Simon Nasht, Trish Lake
- Starring: Dayne Pratzky, Drew Hutton, Alan Jones
- Narrated by: Dayne Pratzky
- Cinematography: Dan Schist Richard Todd
- Edited by: Axel Grigor
- Distributed by: eOne, Madman
- Release date: 7 March 2015 (BBIFF)
- Running time: 90 mins
- Country: Australia
- Language: English
- Budget: A$1 million (est)

Frackman is a 2015 Australian documentary film about the former construction worker turned anti-fracking activist Dayne Pratzky as he responds to the expansion of the coal seam gas industry near Tara, Queensland. The film was produced by Richard Todd of Aquarius Productions, Simon Nasht of Smith & Nasht and with Trish Lake of Freshwater Pictures and was Directed by Richard Todd of Aquarius Productions. The film also features the president of Lock the Gate, Drew Hutton, conservative radio personality Alan Jones and many other residents of Queensland and New South Wales.

Frackman officially premiered at the Byron Bay International Film Festival where it won best feature film and best environmental film in March 2015 and began a regional tour in marginal electorates before the 2015 New South Wales election. Frackman won Best Film and Best Environmental Film at the 2015 Byron Bay International Film Festival. The film was released on DVD and digital platforms on 9 December 2015.

== Production ==
Aquarius Productions commenced production on Frackman in early 2011. The film was shot in Queensland and New South Wales and according to director, Richard Todd, the story is told "through the eyes of Dayne 'The Frackman' Pratzky". By November 2011, Todd had followed sub plot character stories with Drew Hutton, Jeremy Buckingham, Dr Marian Lloyd Smith, Bob Irwin, Barnaby Joyce. Alan Jones had been filmed at a community gathering in Bowral and also in Brisbane. Time-critical shoots had already occurred and further filming was expected to occur in mid 2013. Editing was expected to follow in late 2013. Todd, who was born in Newcastle and hails from Margaret River in Western Australia has said that he is "attracted to stories that require a very close and personal relationship with a central character." He has also said that he has "the ability to be 'let in' to complex and difficult to film situations."

In April 2014, Richard Todd was editing the film with Axel Grigor and announced that the film would be released in "the second half of 2014".

== Release ==
The film was launched with a preview screening in February 2015 in Adelaide, closely followed by a regional Australian tour which commenced in New South Wales in March. The film's promotional poster featured endorsements from conservative radio commentator Alan Jones and former leader of the Australian Greens, Bob Brown. The film had its USA premiere at DOC NYC on 14 November 2015. The film is scheduled for release on DVD and digital platforms on 9 December 2015.

=== Reception ===
Frackman won Best Film and Best Environmental Film at the 2015 Byron Bay International Film Festival. The film subsequently began a screening tour, during which it played to many full houses.

Following a preview screening of Frackman in Adelaide in February 2015 as part of the documentary film festival DocWeek, the Energy Resource Information Centre published a list of 'Frackman Facts' on their website. The centre also questioned the commitment of public funds to the project and described Pratzky as having "made it a personal mission to disrupt, protest and demonise an industry that he doesn’t agree with." The film attracted criticism from former Federal Australian Labor Party leader Mark Latham who described it as "a fracking false alarm" in an opinion piece published by the Australian Financial Review. He went on to criticise the anti-fracking movement by describing it as "one of the most fraudulent, misinformed and irrational pieces of politics I have ever seen."

=== Funding controversy ===
Prior to its official release, the feature-length documentary film Frackman attracted attention due to the substantial state and federal government financial support it received. A private company, Frackman Films Pty Ltd was registered on 17 June 2013. The film received $220,000 from Screen Queensland, $156,400 from ScreenWest (Western Australia) and a further $200,000 from Screen Australia. The West Australian newspaper published that it understood that the Screen West funding equated to 15% of the production's total budget, with the production also eligible for a $435,000 film producer tax credit. The film's co-producer, Trish Lake from Freshwater Pictures, described the government funding as an example of Government supporting free speech. Queensland's Arts Minister Ian Walker agreed, telling the media:

“If anyone was looking for proof that freedom of speech flourishes in Queensland, this documentary is it.”

Western Australian Acting State Premier Kim Hames told The West Australian:

"The State Government supports the jobs, energy supply and opportunities that a well-regulated shale gas industry can provide for WA families... However, we also support the independence of the ScreenWest funding selection process, which does not involve State ministers. I am advised the ScreenWest board considered this project at length and took into account artistic and production merits."

Pratzky found the Government funding funny but said that he didn't believe that it undermined the production. He said of the production: "It’s telling the truth and cutting through a layer of propaganda." The film's producer Simon Nasht described the film as "polemical" and "not a documentary that the public broadcasters, the ABC or SBS, would touch with a barge pole."

==== Screen Australia project assessment ====
Following the film's release, internal documents released via Freedom of Information Act request revealed that two of the three Screen Australia assessors had questioned director Richard Todd's "lack of experience" or "relative inexperience." Prior to funding approval the assessors expressed concerns related to the proposal's "finance plan, high budget and certain line items." In May 2013, film producer Simon Nasht had received a letter from Mary-Ellen Mullane, one of the assessors, who requested that Simon Sheikh's editorial/creative control and co-producer status be removed from the contract. Mullane wrote that "GetUp!'s contribution can only be considered as an alternative distribution strategy, not a co-production partner."

==== Philanthropic support ====
The production also attracted philanthropic support by pitching at an event called Good Pitch, hosted by Shark Island Institute and Documentary Australia Foundation at the Sydney Opera House. In total, over $2 million was raised between seven different feature-length documentary film productions which pitched to an audience of approximately 300 on the day. Distributor Madman committed $10,000 towards Frackman at the event and offered to work with eOne to maximise home entertainment revenues. Producer Trish Lake said of the fundraising at Good Pitch:

“While some... goes to production, the majority will be spent on outreach — building audience interest and excitement ahead of the roll out early next year as it starts an innovative campaign across rural Australia in cinemas and community halls and culminating in city theatres for city dwellers... It will be a roll out over many months with a dialogue we hope for whatever time it takes for state and federal governments to re-think their current deals with the global gas industry.”

Frackman also partnered with Getup! and Lock the Gate and was officially launched in March 2015, followed by a tour of New South Wales, then screenings in Western Australia and Victoria in April. The film's financials and legals were managed by Daniel (Dan) Lake, nephew of producer Trish Lake. Dan Lake was appointed as a director of production investment at Screen Queensland on 3 November 2014.

=== Missing interviews ===
==== Gladstone LNG export contracts and environmental approvals ====
The film's director Richard Todd told the media that his team was surprised that gas export approvals in Queensland had been granted. Todd said that he had interviewed a woman directly involved with the process, who had told him that "She basically quit her job because she was given an ultimatum to make sure those contracts were passed at all costs." While the dredging of Gladstone Harbor and the construction of the Curtis Island LNG export facility featured in the film, export approvals and contracts were not discussed. The first LNG export shipment departed Gladstone on 5 January 2015.
