= Soy tu fan =

- Created by: Dolores Fonzi; Constanza Novick
- Starring: Ana Claudia Talancón; Martín Altomaro; Osvaldo Benavides
- Theme music composer: Emmanuel Horvilleur
- Country of origin: Mexico
- Original language: Spanish
- No. of seasons: 3
- No. of episodes: 34

Production
- Executive producers: Pablo Cruz; Constanza Novick
- Producer: Diego Martinez Ulanosky
- Production location: Mexico City
- Editors: Alejandro Lakano; Adrian Parisi
- Camera setup: Single camera
- Production companies: Canana Films; Fox Television Studios; Once TV México

Original release
- Network: Once TV (seasons 1–2)
- Release: April 28, 2010 – February 1, 2012
- Network: Star+ (season 3)
- Release: November 15, 2023

Soy tu fan (English: I'm your fan) is a Mexican romantic comedy television series produced by Canana Films, Fox Television Studios and Once TV México, and is an adaptation of the Argentine series of the same name created by Dolores Fonzi and Constanza Novick. It is directed by Álvaro Hernández, Mariana Chenillo & Gerardo Naranjo, produced by Pablo Cruz, Constanza Novick, Gael García Bernal, Diego Luna, Geminiano Pineda, Jorge Mondragón, Diego Martínez Ulanosky and Ana Claudia Talancón and written by Constanza Novick. It premiered Wednesday, April 28, 2010 in Mexico on Once TV Mexico, and in the United States on mun2, October 17, 2010. Season 2 began airing on October 19, 2011 on Once TV in Mexico.

== Synopsis ==
Charly (Ana Claudia Talancón) and Nicolas meet in a coffee shop in Mexico City after Charly's breakup with Julián, the frontman of an upcoming band. Nicolas shows interest in Charly and tells her to tell her therapist, with whom she has an appointment later, that she just met the love of her life. Charly appreciates the attention but she feels harassed by him, until after Nicolas's endless attempts to get her to go out with him, he gives up and starts dating a struggling actress. The lack of attention brings Charly back and they engage in a relationship. Rocío and Fernanda, Charly's best friends witness her in her fight to make it work with Nicolas while still trying to get over Julián and put up with his obnoxious new girlfriend, Vanesa.

== Cast and characters ==
- Ana Claudia Talancón as Carla "Charly" García
- Martín Altomaro as Nicolás "Nico" Cruz
- Osvaldo Benavides as Julián Muñoz
- Edwarda Gurrola as Vanesa
- Maya Zapata as Rocío Lozano
- Joahanna Murillo as Fernanda De la Peza
- Verónica Langer as Marta Molina
- Juan Pablo Medina as Iñaki Díaz de Olavarrieta
- Gonzalo García Vivanco as Diego García
- Marcela Guirado as Ana
- Juan Pablo Campa as Federico
- Alfonso Borbolla as Javier
- Fernando Carrillo Serrano as Facu González
- Iván Arana as Emilio Cruz
- Camila Selser as Nini
- Tara Parra as Beba
- Francisco Rubio as Rodrigo
- Mar Carrera as Claudia
- Mariana Gajá as Caro
- Fernando Carrillo as Willy
- Leonardo de Lozanne as Tutor de Charly
- Randy Ebright as Kevin
- Jorge Luke as Roly
- Jorge Mondragón as Director de teatro
- Alejandra Ambrosi as Fer
- Salvador Zerboni as Junior
- Alejandra Ambrosi as Marce
- Rubén Zamora as Español

== Songs heard in the series ==
- Fan - Sandoval
- Jugando con el corazón- Corazón
- Nadie se dará cuenta - Linda Guilala
- Todo o nada - Los Wendy's
- Y tú de que vas - Franco de Vita
- Espero que te acuerdes de mi - Agrupacion Cariño
- Waffes - Los Wendy's
- Revolución de vegetales - Modular
- Esta soledad - Carla Morrison
- Unidos - Cola jet set
- Curse the space - Hey chica
- I'm queen - Le butcherettes
- Obra de arte - Agrupacion cariño
- Aunque yo te quise tanto - Agrupacion cariño chicha
- Algo raro - Sigle
- Tarde o temprano - Elis Paprika
- El amor mejora - Cola jet set
- Issues - Hey chica
- Y al final - Bianca Alexander
- Fiesta permanente- Pau y sus amigos
- La peligrosa - Los wendy's
- Estando contigo - Los soberanos
- Dame la felicidad - Bianca Alexander
- Fuego al juego- Pau y amigos
- La revolucio sexual - La casa azul
- Nunca voy a olvidarte- Mariana Gaja
- Lágrimas- Carla Morrison
- Vamos a volar- La casa azul
- Ovni - Modular
- El río se llevará tu nombre- Corazón
- Bendita - La bien querida
- Por ti no moriré -Joe Arroyo y la verdad
- Que suene mi campana- La sonora carruseles & harold
- Se me perdió la cadenita - Sonora dinamita
- Me tienes vigilado - Orquesta los Niches
- Sobre dosis - Los titanes & Oscar Quesada
- María Shaula - Jorge Luke
- Hoy ten miedo de mi- Fernando Delgadillo
- Hippie - Modular
- Lo que me gusta del verano es poder tomar helado- Papa topo
- Creo que me quieres- Los fresones rebeldes
- Right for you - Asia
- Matrimonio por conveniencia - Pau y sonido trucha
- Aunque yo te quise tanto - Agrupacion cariño
- Rewind- Gentleman reg
- Nadie se dará cuenta - Linda Guilala
- Cucurrucho- Guatafan
- El moneto más feliz- La casa azul
- Issues - Hey chica
- Acapulco- Agrupacion cariño
- Estando contigo- Los Soberanos
- Corre - Bianca Alexander
- Algo raro- Single
- El tripulante - Agrupacion Cariño
- Nadie se dará cuenta - Linda Guilala
- Llevame a dormir- Single
- Cielo rojo- Fernando Carrillo
- Obra de arte - Agrupacion Cariño
- Que suene mi campana- Sonora carruseles
- Compartir- Carla Morrison
- El sueño de mi vida- Cola jet set
