= Dayne Pratzky =

Australian anti-fracking activist

Dayne Pratzky is an Australian anti-fracking activist known colloquially as the Frackman. He is also the subject of a 2015 feature-length documentary film of the same name produced by Smith & Nasht.

A former tunnel-digger and resident of Sydney, Pratzky moved to Queensland in his thirties. He describes himself as an "accidental" activist who only started campaigning against fracking after seeing the encroachment of the coal seam gas industry on rural farming communities. Pratsky is not affiliated with any political party and has said that he will work with anyone who gets results.

Pratzky believes that the unconventional gas industry puts clean air and water resources in Australia at risk, and argues that exporting gas puts upwards pressure on domestic gas prices. He also believes that employment opportunities have been overstated by the industry and by Government and that payments made to landholders have not been equitable, given that affected properties have in some cases been rendered unsaleable.

== Activism ==
Pratzky bought a 100 hectare block of land in the Wieambilla estates near Tara in what farmers call "goanna country" in 2004. In 2005 he was employed on Lane Cove Tunnel project in New South Wales where he sustained a back injury. He began receiving worker's compensation payments, and has been limited in his employment prospects since, despite having a strong will to work. What has been described as Queensland's most disadvantaged community became his home. There, Pratzky observed the community becoming divided and disenchanted as gas wells were established by QGC, a company later acquired by British Gas. He was presented with a land access agreement by QGC in 2009 and subsequently tore it up. He learned of health complaints suffered by children including nose-bleeds and headaches which locals believed were caused by the industry's impacts on air and groundwater quality.

In April 2009, Pratzky organised a four-day blockade of trucks and committed himself to anti-coal seam gas activism. He was trained in non-violent protest techniques by Drew Hutton, founder of Lock the Gate and a former Greens candidate. Kjerulf Ainsworth, son of pokie king Len Ainsworth, provided financial support for lawyers and equipment.

In 2010 and 2011, Pratzky toured the anti-fracking documentary film Gasland by American filmmaker Josh Fox. He screened the film across the eastern states of Australia, covering a distance of 170,000 kilometres and reaching audiences ranging in size from 16 people to 128. Pratzky was interviewed by Fox when he visited Tara and later appeared in the sequel — Gasland Part II. Pratzky has also visited the United States with politician Jeremy Buckingham to see the industry's impact there.

In 2012, Pratzky brought national media attention to the occurrence of gas bubbles leaking from the bed of the Condamine River.

In 2015, Dayne moved to Smiths Lake, Forster in New South Wales where he has said he will continue to campaign against coal seam gas until a statewide ban is established. Pratzky has also considered a possible future in politics, but acknowledges his lack of formal education and financial backing as potential barriers. He told the Sydney Morning Herald: "I do know what it's like to be screwed over by the people who are there to protect us. To be totally honest, I'd relish the opportunity." Pratzky worked with the Frack Free NT Alliance and in 2015 supported their calls for the Darwin Festival to reject sponsorship offers from oil and gas company Santos, due to the company's involvement in shale gas development in the Northern Territory.

Pratzky has suffered multiple break-ins to his property, vandalism to his car and the poisoning of his dogs — occurrences he has attributed to his opposition to the coal seam gas industry.

In June 2016, Pratzky indicated that he would run in the 2017 Mid-Coast Council election as an independent.

== Early life ==
Pratzky was born in New South Wales and describes himself as having been "a total ratbag in school." As a teenager, he worked at butchery and spray painting. He also worked as a commercial diver, despite lacking formal qualifications. He secured a job on the Parramatta rail link project by visiting the project's site office uninvited, each morning, for three consecutive weeks.

== See also ==
- Frackman
