= Latitudes (film) =

2014 film directed by Felipe Braga

- Theatrical poster
- Directed by: Felipe Braga
- Starring: Alice Braga; Daniel de Oliveira
- Distributed by: O2 Play
- Release date: 28 February 2014
- Running time: 82 minutes
- Country: Brazil
- Language: Portuguese

Latitudes is a 2014 Brazilian romance-drama film directed by Felipe Braga, starring Alice Braga and Daniel de Oliveira. The film tells the story of a couple who finds themselves in several places around the world, such as hotels, airports and train stations, in cities like Paris, London, Venice, Porto, Buenos Aires and Istanbul.

The film is part of a transmedia project. Initially, it was exhibited on the Internet in several episodes. Later, went on television, and finally, it was released at the cinema. This was the intention of the director and producers since the beginning of the project.

== Plot ==
The film follows the encounters and separations of a couple, who are always in high standard hotels, train stations and airports in Latin America, Europe and Asia. In the movie, Alice Braga is Olivia, a fashion editor who travels the world searching for trends, and Daniel de Oliveira is José, a renowned photographer who travels the world doing editorials.
