= Cha Cha Cha Films =

Film production company

- Company type: Private
- Industry: Film production
- Founded: 2007
- Founder: Alfonso Cuarón, Alejandro González Iñárritu, Guillermo del Toro
- Headquarters: Mexico City, Mexico
- Products: Film

Cha Cha Cha Films (Spanish: Cha Cha Chá Producciones) is a film production company founded by The filmmakers Alfonso Cuarón, Alejandro González Iñárritu and Guillermo del Toro. The first film released under the Cha Cha Cha banner was Rudo y Cursi, which the three partners produced but did not direct.

== Filmography ==
- Rudo y Cursi (2008)
- Mother and Child (2009)
- Biutiful (2010)
- The Book of Life (2014) (Uncredited)
- Trollhunters (2016–2018)
