= Early Winter (film) =

- Directed by: Michael Rowe
- Written by: Michael Rowe
- Produced by: Trish Lake; Serge Noël
- Starring: Suzanne Clément; Paul Doucet
- Cinematography: Nicolas Canniccioni
- Music by: Amy Bastow
- Release date: 3 September 2015 (Venice Film Festival)
- Countries: Canada; Australia
- Language: English

Early Winter is a 2015 Canadian-Australian drama film written and directed by Michael Rowe. It was awarded Best Film in the Venice Days section at the 72nd Venice International Film Festival.

== Plot ==
A man lives a predictable life with his wife and children, but begins to suspect that his wife is having an affair.

== Cast ==
- Suzanne Clément as Maya
- Paul Doucet as David
- Ambrosio De Luca as Maxime
- Max Laferriere as André
- Michael Riendeau as Sergei
- Alexandre Marine as Alexandre
