= Beatrice Kozera =

Beatrice 'Bea' Kozera
- Born: Beatrice Rentería; October 13, 1920
- Died: August 15, 2013 (aged 92)

Beatrice (Bea) Kozera (née Rentería; October 13, 1920 – August 15, 2013) was an American-born woman, farm worker, and single mother. She was the inspiration for the character "Terry" (or "Terry, the Mexican girl") in Jack Kerouac's 1957 novel, On the Road. In fact, it was this story, "The Mexican Girl," that opened the doors for the publication of "On the Road." The book was later the subject of a 2012 film adaptation of the same name produced by Francis Ford Coppola in which she was marginally portrayed by Alice Braga. Until 2013, her life story was unknown until author Tim Z. Hernandez began to search for her in 2008 and discovered her alive in his hometown of Fresno, California in 2010. Together with Kozera and her family he wrote the book Mañana Means Heaven. It is the only account of Bea Kozera's story that was authorized by the family.

== Life ==
Kozera was born in Los Angeles and raised with her family moving between East Los Angeles and the fields around Selma, California, near Fresno. She married Albert Franco Sr., but she left him and raised their two children on her own.

In 1947, while still married to Franco, she met Jack Kerouac in Bakersfield, California, and the two began a brief relationship that ended with Kerouac returning to New York.

On July 21, 1963, she married LeRoy Kozera and settled in Fresno, California.

== On The Road ==
In 1957 Kerouac published his novel On the Road, in which Kozera featured as "Terry" (or "Terry, the Mexican girl"). Kozera was unaware that their brief relationship had become a subject of Kerouac's novel - described as "the book that defined a generation" - until she was contacted in 2010 by writer Tim Z. Hernandez. Hernandez went on to publish his own novel, Mañana Means Heaven, a partially fictionalised account of Kozera's life. Hernandez spent two years interviewing Kozera to establish as full an account of her life as was possible. The book was published two weeks prior to her death in 2013.

In 2012, a film version of Kerouac's book was produced by Francis Ford Coppola and directed by Walter Salles in which Kozera (as "Terry") was portrayed by Alice Braga.
