= Mother and Child (2009 film) =

2009 film

- Australian theatrical poster
- Directed by: Rodrigo García
- Written by: Rodrigo García
- Produced by: Lisa Maria Falcone; Julie Lynn
- Starring: Naomi Watts; Annette Bening; Kerry Washington; Jimmy Smits; Samuel L. Jackson; David Morse; David Ramsey
- Cinematography: Xavier Pérez Grobet
- Edited by: Steven Weisberg
- Music by: Ed Shearmur
- Production companies: Cha Cha Cha Films; Everest Entertainment; Mockingbird Pictures
- Distributed by: Sony Pictures Classics
- Release dates: September 14, 2009 (TIFF); May 7, 2010
- Running time: 125 minutes
- Countries: United States; Mexico
- Language: English
- Budget: $7 million
- Box office: $5.6 million

Mother and Child is a 2009 drama film directed and written by Rodrigo García. It premiered on September 14, 2009, at the 2009 Toronto International Film Festival and at the Sundance Film Festival on January 23, 2010, and was the closing night selection in the 2010 Maryland Film Festival. It had a limited release in the United States beginning May 7, 2010. The film was favorably reviewed by critics, but did poorly at the box office, as it only grossed $5.6 million on a modest $7 million budget

== Plot ==
When she was 14, Karen became pregnant and her mother decided for her to give her daughter up for adoption. Having to give up her child has always haunted her. Ever since, Karen has had difficulty forming connections with people.

Upon meeting laid-back Paco at work, Karen allows her anxiety and mistrust to get the best of her. She is initially hostile and suspicious of his friendliness and interest. Karen gradually calms her anxiety through her growing relationship with Paco, and eventually they get married.

Paco persuades Karen to write a letter to her unknown, adult daughter, and she leaves the letter with the Catholic agency that had arranged the adoption. The letter is not addressed to any name, as she does not know it, and the person who is meant to file it gets distracted.

Karen's daughter Elizabeth, grows up to be solitary, willful, and hardhearted. She is hired as an attorney at a prestigious law firm headed by Paul. They have an affair and, although she had her tubes tied at 17, she becomes pregnant. Elizabeth quits without informing Paul of her condition and moves to a new apartment and a new job.

Some months pass, and Elizabeth is seen by one of Paul's daughters, but denies the baby is his. Even so, Paul stops by, offering to drop a new relationship he is in to become a proper couple, which she declines. However, he does convince her to leave a letter for her biological mother with the adoption agency.

Lucy is a baker who longs to be a mother, but she cannot have children of her own. She and her husband Joseph contact the same adoption agency as Karen and they meet with a young, pregnant, prospective mother. After a protracted interview period, the mother agrees to give the couple her baby.

Shortly before she gives birth, Joseph reveals that he really wants to have his own biological child, so he and Lucy separate. So, she decides to go ahead with the adoption alone. However, the birth mother changes her mind shortly after giving birth, and Lucy is devastated by the news.

Elizabeth dies while giving birth to her child. Since no one steps forward to claim the baby, the agency offers the baby to Lucy, who adopts her. At first, she is overwhelmed by the demands of being a new mother and complains about it bitterly to her mother, who sets her straight.

One year later, Karen finds out about Elizabeth's death and her letter, which had been misplaced, informing her that she has a granddaughter named Ella. The agency arranges a meeting so Karen gets to know the little girl and Lucy, who live a short distance away in her own neighborhood.

== Cast ==
- Naomi Watts as Elizabeth Joyce
- Annette Bening as Karen
  - Alexandria M. Salling as Karen at 14 yrs. old
- Kerry Washington as Lucy
- Samuel L. Jackson as Paul
- David Ramsey as Joseph
- Shareeka Epps as Ray Lawrence
- David Morse as Tom Weller
  - Connor Kramme as Tom at 14 yrs. old
- Amy Brenneman as Dr. Stone
- Marc Blucas as Steven
- Carla Gallo as Tracy
- Jimmy Smits as Paco
- Brittany Robertson as Violet
- Tatyana Ali as Maria
- Cherry Jones as Sister Joanne
- Elpidia Carrillo as Sofia
- S. Epatha Merkerson as Ada
- Ahmed Best as Julian
- Eileen Ryan as Nora
- LaTanya Richardson as Carol
- LisaGay Hamilton as Leticia Lawrence
- Elizabeth Peña as Amanda

== Production ==
The film was originally going to be produced by Cha Cha Cha Films, Focus Films and Universal Studios; Julie Lynn through Mockingbird Films took over in late 2008 with a production budget of $7 million. Principal photography began in January, 2009.

== Reception ==
The film was met with generally favorable reviews, with critics praising the standout performance of Annette Bening. It has a 78% approval rating based on 128 reviews on Rotten Tomatoes. The site's critics consensus reads, "Though it occasionally veers into unnecessary melodrama, Mother and Child benefits from a stellar cast and writer-director Rodrigo Garcia's finely detailed, bravely unsentimental script." On Metacritic, the film has a weighted average score of 64, indicating "generally favorable reviews".

The film was awarded the Grand Prix du Jury at the 2010 Deauville American Film Festival.
