= José Ángel García =

Mexican actor (1950–2021)

- Born: José Ángel García Huerta; 30 October 1950; Huetamo, Michoacán, Mexico
- Died: 22 January 2021 (aged 70); Mexico City, Mexico
- Occupations: Actor, director
- Years active: 1965–2021
- Spouse: Patricia Bernal (divorced)
- Children: Gael García Bernal

José Ángel García (30 October 1950 – 22 January 2021) was a Mexican stage and television actor and director. He was the father of actor Gael García Bernal.

García began acting at the age of fourteen, appearing in various telenovelas. He was a director of the long running Mexican anthology drama television series La rosa de Guadalupe.
