= Rudo y Cursi =

- Theatrical release poster
- Directed by: Carlos Cuarón
- Written by: Carlos Cuarón
- Produced by: Alfonso Cuarón; Alejandro González Iñárritu; Guillermo del Toro
- Starring: Gael García Bernal; Diego Luna; Guillermo Francella
- Narrated by: Guillermo Francella
- Cinematography: Adam Kimmel
- Edited by: Alex Rodríguez
- Music by: Leoncio Lara
- Production companies: Cha Cha Cha Films; Focus Features International; Esperanto Filmoj; Producciones Anhelo; Canana Films
- Distributed by: Universal Pictures International
- Release date: December 19, 2008
- Running time: 103 minutes
- Country: Mexico
- Language: Spanish
- Box office: $11.2 million

Rudo y Cursi (Spanish, literally, "Rough and Corny") is a 2008 Mexican sports film written and directed by Carlos Cuarón in his feature-length directorial debut. It is produced by Cha Cha Cha Films and stars Diego Luna, Gael García Bernal and Guillermo Francella.

== Synopsis ==
In the fictional farming village of Tachatlán, in the Cihuatlán Valley of Jalisco, Mexico, young men dream of escaping the drudgery of the banana plantations. Two of them, a pair of half-brothers, play in local football matches. Tato is the star striker and Beto is the eccentric goalkeeper. During one match, they are spotted by a talent scout and he offers one of them the opportunity to go to Mexico City with him and try out for one of the country's big teams. As the scout's roster is already full, he says he can only take one of the brothers and they decide to settle it on a penalty shot. Tato scores the penalty against his brother, therefore earning the right to head to the capital.

== Cast ==
- Gael García Bernal as Tato "Cursi" Verdusco
- Diego Luna as Beto "Rudo" Verdusco
- Guillermo Francella as Darío "Batuta" Vidali
- Dolores Heredia as Elvira
- Joaquín Cosio as Arnulfo
- Adriana Paz as Toña

== Production ==
Carlos Cuarón first formed the idea for the film while on a promotional tour for Y tu mamá también. He initially planned for only one character, but later decided to include a brother.

Principal photography began in summer 2007 in Cihuatlán, Mexico. The banana plantation where the brothers work in the film is actually owned by the Cuarón family. For his role Bernal wore blonde extensions to lengthen his hair while Luna dyed his hair black and grew a mustache to play the older brother. Additional filming took place in México City and Toluca.

== Release ==
Rudo y Cursi released in December 2008 in Mexico. It premiered internationally at the April 2009 San Francisco International Film Festival and was screened at the 2009 Sundance Film Festival and the Tribeca Film Festival. It was released generally, on a limited basis, on May 8, 2009. It was released on DVD and Blu-ray Disc on August 25, 2009.

=== Box office ===
Rudo y Cursi was very successful at the box office. It became the sixth top grossing Mexican movie of all time. In its first two weeks in the US, it earned $738,706 on 219 screens. It eventually grossed $9,264,208 in overseas earnings, bringing its worldwide total to $11,091,868.

== Reception ==
The film received generally positive reviews from critics. On the review aggregator website Rotten Tomatoes, the film holds an approval rating of 72% based on 109 reviews. The website's critics consensus reads, "Despite its fair share of sports movie cliches, Rudo y Cursi marks an auspicious directing debut for Carlos Cuarón, and features strong performances from García Bernal and Luna." On Metacritic, the film has a score of 67 out of 100 based on reviews from 25 critics, indicating "generally favorable reviews".
