= Año bisiesto =

Año Bisiesto (Leap Year)
- Promotional picture
- Directed by: Michael Rowe
- Written by: Lucía Carreras; Michael Rowe
- Produced by: Machete Producciones, Instituto Mexicano de Cinematografía (IMCINE)
- Starring: Monica del Carmen; Gustavo Sánchez Parra; Marco Zapata; Armando Hernández
- Cinematography: Juan Manuel Sepulveda
- Music by: Song "Flores para ti" from Afrodita
- Distributed by: Canana Films
- Release date: 17 May 2010 (Cannes)
- Running time: 92 min.
- Country: Mexico
- Language: Spanish

Año Bisiesto (Leap Year) is a 2010 Mexican film from the Australian-Mexican screenwriter and film director Michael Rowe.

== Synopsis ==
Shot almost entirely in a seedy one-room apartment, this psychodrama details the grinding routine of Laura (Mónica del Carmen), a 25-year-old freelance journalist, who lives a very isolated life in her small apartment, rarely venturing out besides bringing men home from nightclubs. She never spends more than one night in bed with any of them, until she meets the quiet, inscrutable Arturo (Gustavo Sánchez Parra), and the pair enter into an intense, violent sexual relationship. The story focuses on the fascinating evolution of their relationship. As days go by, Laura crosses out the days on a calendar, revealing her secret past to her lover. It takes place in February on a leap year.

== Production ==
At first, Michael Rowe wanted the violence and sexual relations on screen to be real, but during filming Gustavo Sánchez Parra proposed simulating some of these acts because "that's what filmmaking is all about, making people believe that we do things for real." Rowe changed his stance, and later confirmed that in the end only two scenes were unsimulated.

== Main releases ==
The film premiered in France, at the Cannes Film Festival Directors' Fortnight 17 May 2010, and a month later on a public release. Next place to see the film was Rowe's home country, Australia, at the Melbourne International Film Festival and many other Film Festivals followed (Toronto, Athens, Rio de Janeiro, Sao Paulo, Mar del Plata in Argentine, Hong Kong and the Latin Beat Film Festival in Japan, among others).

According to the producers, the film was sold in over 30 countries and in Mexico it played in commercial theaters with only 12 copies and was seen by close to 50,000 spectators –unlike large productions that screen up to 200 copies.

== Film festivals and awards ==
Year	Edition	Festival / Institution	Section	Award	To	Result
2010	63rd	Festival de Cannes (France)	Competition	Camera d'Or (first-time director)	Michael Rowe	Won
2010	59th	Melbourne International Film Festival (Australia)				
2010	59th	Toronto International Film Festival (Canada)	Contemporary World			Nominated
2010	8th	Morelia International Film Festival (Mexico)				
2010	25th	Mar del Plata International Film Festival (Argentina)				
2010	48th	Gijón International Film Festival (Spain)	Official	Best Film		Nominated
2010	54th	London Film Festival (UK)	World Cinema			
2011	53rd	Academia Mexicana de Artes y Ciencias Cinematográficas (AMACC)	Ariel Awards	Best Actress	Mónica del Carmen	Won
2011	53rd	Academia Mexicana de Artes y Ciencias Cinematográficas (AMACC)	Ariel Awards	Best Original Script	Lucía Carreras; Michael Rowe	Nominated
2011	53rd	Academia Mexicana de Artes y Ciencias Cinematográficas (AMACC)	Ariel Awards	Best First Feature	Michael Rowe	Won
