= Libby Connors =

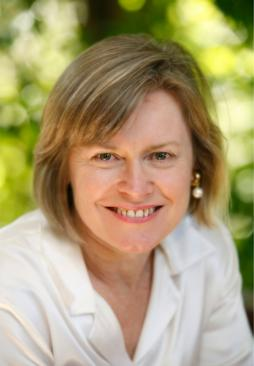
- Connors circa 2012
- Born: 8 August 1960 (age 66)
- Awards: Queensland Premier's Award for a work of State Significance (2015)

Academic background
- Education: University of Queensland (BA [Hons], PhD)
- Thesis: The "Birth of the Prison" and the Death of Convictism: The Operation of the Law in Pre-separation Queensland 1839 to 1859 (1990)
- Doctoral advisor: Kay Saunders

Academic work
- Discipline: History
- Sub-discipline: Legal history Environmental history Colonial history
- Institutions: University of Southern Queensland
- Notable works: Warrior (2015)

Elizabeth Louise Alice Connors (born 8 August 1960) is associate professor of history at the University of Southern Queensland.

In 1992, Connors co-wrote Australia's Frontline: Remembering the 1939–45 War with Lynette Finch, Kay Saunders and Helen Taylor.

In 1999, Connors published A History of the Australian Environment Movement with co-author Drew Hutton.

In 2015 Connors received the Queensland Premier's Award for a work of State Significance for Warrior: A Legendary Leader's Dramatic Life and Violent Death on the Colonial Frontier. The book followed Dalla lawman Dundalli from his life in southeast Queensland to his execution outside Brisbane gaol on 5 January 1855.
