= La rosa de Guadalupe =

Mexican anthology drama television series

- Genre: Melodrama; Drama
- Created by: Carlos Mercado Orduña
- Written by: Julián Aguilar; Carlos Mercado; Mauricio Aridjis; Fabián Quezada
- Directed by: José Ángel García; Marta Luna; Ricardo de la Parra; Eduardo Said; Lorena Maza
- Presented by: Helena Rojo
- Opening theme: Instrumental theme
- Country of origin: Mexico
- Original language: Spanish
- No. of episodes: 2,000+

Production
- Executive producer: Miguel Angel Herros
- Production locations: Filming; Televisa San Ángel; Mexico City, Mexico; Locations; Mexico City, Mexico
- Camera setup: Multi-camera
- Running time: 41–44 minutes
- Production company: Televisa

Original release
- Network: Las Estrellas
- Release: 5 February 2008 – present

La Rosa de Guadalupe (English title: The Rose of Guadalupe) is a long-running Mexican anthology drama television series created by Carlos Mercado Orduña and produced by Miguel Ángel Herros. The series blends moral story telling with Mexican Catholic religiosity, specifically to the Virgin of Guadalupe. Each episode presents a self-contained drama in which characters confront personal or societal dilemmas, often finding resolution through faith.

The show is known for its signature use of a white rose and a gust of wind to signal the Virgin’s presence. It is set in modern times and mostly takes place in Mexico City, although location varies in some episodes. The series premiered on Las Estrellas on 5 February 2008. In the United States, the series debuted on Univision on 26 June 2008.

Over time, it has expanded to include more intense and socially relevant narratives, especially in its weekend programming. Despite mixed critical feedback, it has maintained a strong viewership and cultural impact, spawning international versions and becoming a recognizable part of Latin American media.

== Plot ==
There are two types of beginnings for the episodes: either with a peaceful or happy situation that slowly turns into a serious problem, or with a dramatic event—like a sudden accident, betrayal, or crisis—that immediately sets the characters on a difficult path. In episodes that begin with a major event, the credits for the cast and crew often appear during the second scene, emphasizing the urgency of the situation.

Then, the main character is typically shown as someone who believes deeply in the Virgin of Guadalupe, almost always ask her to protect them. When they face trouble, they pray to her for help. After this prayer, a white rose appears near a statue or image of the Virgin in their home. This rose stays visible throughout the episode and signals that the Virgin has heard their petition.

As the story continues, the problem often gets worse before it gets better, showing how the character struggles with choices, relationships, or outside pressures. Toward the end of the episode, someone close to the main character—such as a friend, parent, teacher, or neighbor—steps in to help. This person is portrayed as being guided by the Virgin to offer support or advice. Once the problem is resolved, a gust of wind touches the main character, symbolizing the Virgin’s presence and blessing. The episode ends with the white rose disappearing and a voiceover explaining the moral or lesson of the story.

== History ==
=== "Las mil rosas" ("The Thousand Roses") ===
On 5 July 2017, the series began its 1,000th episode celebration. Remastered versions of the earliest episodes from 2008 to 2016 were aired beginning 10 July 2017. On 22 July 2017, the 1,000th episode, "The Bastard Sister", was aired. Alejandra Barros and Alexis Ayala starred in the episode.

=== Impact stories ===
Starting in May 2017, "La rosa de Guadalupe" began broadcasting episodes with more serious, social issue-driven "impact" stories on Saturdays at 9:30 pm. These stories featured more explicit topics such as rape, incest, sexual harassment, murder, and drug addiction. The content rating given to these Saturday night episodes is B-15, compared to the B-rated episodes on weekdays.

== Reception ==
The series' features are a staple of modern Mexican television, due to its prime daily time slot and original episodes throughout the year, and its popularity among the nation's Catholic population. Some have criticized the show since its debut for its tendency for melodramatic acting, writing and directing, and for its dependence on a morality play mode of presentation long abandoned by religions and television networks in other countries as outmoded. Others take issue with the religious bias of the series when it comes to serious issues as addiction, bullying, family violence and sexual abuse, and the refusal of the series to go beyond those views.

The series has obtained a cult following online presented out of context, with multiple parodies, national Internet memes, other programs poking fun at it and a public face that considers the program "so bad it's good".

=== Similar programs ===
In 2009, a similar program for TV Azteca, A cada quien su santo, began airing on; though similar, that series focuses on a number of saints rather than solely the Virgin of Guadalupe.

== Adaptations ==
In November 2018, América Televisión announced that a Peruvian adaptation of the series was in production titled La Rosa de Guadalupe: Perú. On 20 March 2020, two years after the announcement, the series premiered. La Rosa de Guadalupe: Perú consisted of 20 episodes and is considered as a spiritual sequel to Solamente Milagros.

In August 2021, Romanian channel Antena 1 adapted the series as Povești de familie, having the same anthologic format as the original.
