= Patricia Bernal =

Mexican actress

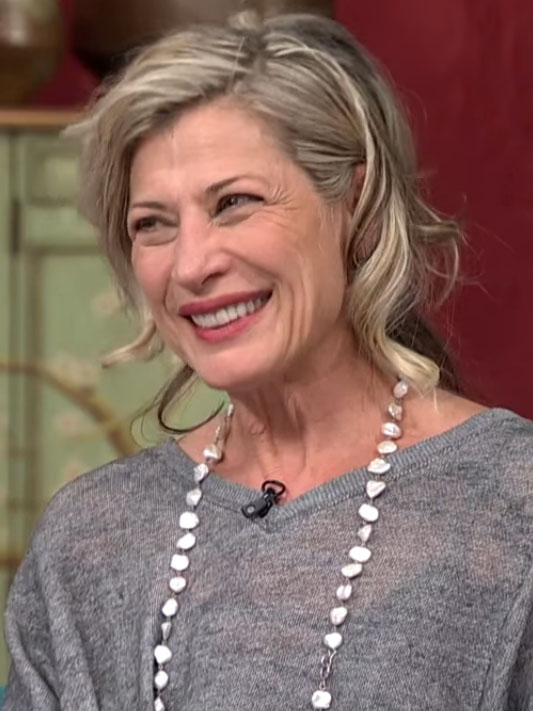
- Born: 27 October 1961 (age 64); Cosalá, Sinaloa, Mexico
- Occupation: Actress
- Years active: 1977–present
- Children: 3, including Gael García Bernal and Darío Yazbek Bernal

Patricia Bernal (born 27 October 1961) is a Mexican actress. She has appeared in more than twenty films and telenovelas including Pobre rico, pobre. Her sons Gael (whose father is José Ángel García) and Darío (whose father is Sergio Yazbek) are also actors. She also has a daughter, Tamara Yazbek Bernal.

== Selected filmography ==
Film
Year	Title	Role	Notes
2017	Everybody Loves Somebody	Eva	
2019	La boda de mi mejor amigo		
2020	New Order	Pilar	
2022	Incomplete Lovers	Elena	
2024	A History of Love and War	Lulú	

TV
Year	Title	Role	Notes
1987	Yesenia		
1988	El pecado de Oyuki	Margarita	
1989	Teresa		
1992	Ángeles sin paraíso	Aurora Sombría	
1997	Gente bien	Mariana	
2006	Amores cruzados		
2008–2009	Pobre rico, pobre	Antonia de Ferreira	
2010	La loba		
2011	A corazón abierto		
2012	Amor cautivo	Maribel Sosa de Arismendi	
2015	Así en el barrio como en el cielo	Francesca Ferrara	
