= Graham Shirley =

Australian filmmaker

Graham Shirley is an Australian author, researcher, curator and filmmaker best known for his work in the area of Australian film history.

He was one of the original class of the Australian Film Television and Radio School and is the co-author of Australian Cinema: The First Eighty Years, a classic history of the Australian film industry. He has also made a number of documentaries.

== Filmography ==
- For the Term of his Natural Life (1927) – restored film in 1981
- Allies (1983) – archival researcher
- The Dismissal (1983) – archival researcher
- Bodyline (1984) – archival researcher
- The Cowra Breakout (1984) – archival researcher
- Prisoners of Propaganda (1987) – researcher, writer, and director
- Wharfies (1988) – archival researcher
- Blood, Sweat and Tears (1988) – director (3 episodes)
- Wings Over Australia (1989) – archival researcher
- Hindsight (1990–91) – archival researcher
- Submarine: Sharks of Steel (1992) – archival researcher
- Timeframe – episode "Striking for State Aid" (1997)
- Federation (2001) – archival researcher
- Colour of War: The Anzacs (2003) – archival researcher
- Behind the Lines: The Secret War of Z Special Unit (2003) -writer, director
- White Bay Power (2003) – director
- Frank Hurley: The Man who Made History (2004) – archival researcher
- Blowing Up Paradise (2004) – archival researcher
- Road to Tokyo (2005) – writer, director
