= Michael Rowe (director) =

Australian film director

Michael Rowe is an Australian film director and screenwriter. He is best known for his films Leap Year (2010) and The Well (2013), both made in Mexico, and Early Winter (2015).

== Early life and education ==
Rowe studied English post-colonial literature at La Trobe University in Melbourne, Australia.

== Career ==
Rowe's artistic career first began as a poet, winning the Melbourne Fringe Festival Poetry Prize. He then moved to theatre and wrote three plays. In 1994, at the age of 23, he traveled to Mexico and made it his adoptive home. In 1998, while in Mexico, he began a career as a journalist while studying screenwriting at a Vincente Leñero workshop. In 2005, one of his first scripts, Naturalezas muertas won at the Instituto Mexicano de Cinematografía. In 2006, he directed his first short film, Cacahuates. Silencio followed in 2007. Though English is his native language, the bulk of his film work is done in Spanish.

In 2010, Rowe directed Año bisiesto (Leap Year), which garnered him the Caméra d'Or prize for best first time feature film director at the Cannes Film Festival. The film was well received by critics.

His second feature, The Well (Manto acuífero), was based on the short story "Secrets" by Tim Winton. It premiered at the Rome Film Festival in 2013.

In 2013, it was announced that Rowe was working on his English-language feature debut, slated for production in Montreal, Quebec, Canada. The film, Early Winter, is a co-production between a Quebec production house, Possibles Media, (run by Serge Noël), and Australia's Freshwater Pictures (run by Trish Lake), and stars Suzanne Clément. The film had a first cut shown at the Melbourne film festival where it was reviewed, but the official international premiere of the director's cut was at the Venice Mostra where it won the Venice Days Award for 2015.

== Theatre ==
- Impudence and Innocence (1993)
- Reprise for Godot (1993)

== Feature films ==
- Leap Year (Año bisiesto) (2010)
- The Well (Manto acuífero) (2013)
- Early Winter (2015)
- Danyka (2020)
