= Frank Hurley: The Man who Made History =

- Directed by: Simon Nasht
- Written by: Simon Nasht
- Produced by: Anna Cater
- Narrated by: Linda Cropper
- Cinematography: Peter Coleman
- Music by: Mick Harvey
- Production company: Mitra Films
- Release date: 23 August 2004
- Running time: 1 hour

Frank Hurley: The Man who Made History is a 2004 documentary focusing on the work of photographer Frank Hurley. The documentary, written and directed by Simon Nasht, describes the highly controversial work of Frank Hurley after the discovery of his fabrication of many photos which were previously thought of as extremely significant.

The documentary, from Mitra Films, is also being used in the New South Wales HSC English syllabus as an available text to explore the concept of discovery until the end of 2018. This is due to the fact that the principles of discovery are embodied by the audiences discovery of Hurley's ethical dilemma as well as the rediscoveries experienced by Papuans which is evidenced in the documentary.

The documentary is made up of narration of the events of Hurley's life, which also includes discussion from historians, journalists and other professionals as to the implications of his work. Additionally, Hurley's personal diary is shared with the audience in order to capture his thoughts and feelings throughout the dramatic events in his life.

== Plot ==
The documentary examines the controversy of Hurley employing composite photographs for more stunning photographs. In particular, Hurley's work in Antarctica, both world wars and his expeditions to Papua New Guinea. The film includes strongly divided opinions on the ethical implications of his deceit, as well as a discussion of the consequences of Hurley's subjugation of the native Papuan population. Nasht also touches on Hurley's later work chronicling the Australian continent through photographs. Ultimately, the documentary employs differing perspectives to display both the positive and negative results of Hurley's often unethical exploits. This is accomplished through the interviews with different characters as well as relaying the impartial truth as to the events.

Regarding the Antarctic voyage, when interviewing historian Alasdair McGregor, he offers the insight that despite the journalist's tampering, Hurley still ensured the continuity of photographic records for significant moments in history, stating that "without a visual record of the expedition, the exploits would be virtually a footnote in Antarctic history. Hurley's twin daughters Adelie and Toni provide insight into their father's character in an emotional moment where they mourn their father, showcasing Hurley's humanity. It is also revealed that on this expedition, the crew discovered Elephant Island. It is on this island where Adelie and Toni are overcome with emotion, due to seeing the island their father discovered. On this island, Hurley and his crew become stranded and are later rescued. On this Antarctic expedition, Hurley often stumbled through dangerous and risky experiences in order to find the 'perfect photo.' The documentary refers to this expedition as a "glorious failure" as an accurate way to describe the expedition and Hurley's exploits.

The audience does see Hurley's vulnerable side however. This is shown mostly through the revelation of his wife, Antoinette and twin daughters. Letters sent between them are shown in the documentary to humanise the photographer. The documentary also showcases the struggle of the women in Hurley's life. Antoinette had to support herself and two daughters almost completely by herself while her husband travelled constantly. It is revealed that in 42 years of marriage, their only holiday as a married couple was their honeymoon near the Nile River, both allowing audiences to feel sympathy for the Hurleys as well as understand Frank's devotion to his craft. Additionally, Adelie and Toni suffered due to their father's absence in their formative years, with the twins saying "we were so used to him being out of our lives... Wouldn't like having a father at all really." Additionally, audiences discover that Hurley didn't even inform his family about his Antarctic voyage before leaving, rather, Antoinette learned about it from the local news.

Additionally, the documentary discusses Hurley's role in World War I, World War II, specifically the battle of Passchendaele. Due to his previous work, Hurley was chosen to be the chief cameraman, and the documentary explores his disillusion with war after the fact. The audience sees how he struggled to reconcile his creativity and artistic integrity, eventually choosing to use creative composites to create a much more dramatic depiction of war. The historian, Charles Bean, refuses to acknowledge Hurley's work, stating "we'll not have it at any price," shaming him for being unethical. This led to Hurley's feud with the Australian Imperial Force (AIF) in which they claimed that his edits didn't properly capture the reality of war. An explanation from the narrator describes that Hurley wished to incorporate every feature of war within his photos, hence his utilisation of composites. Using this method, he was able to capture many aspects of war within one photo, such as camaraderie, battle and death. The composites were made of photos taken before, during and after the war.

The documentary then evaluates Hurley's crusades in Papua New Guinea, in which he subjugated the native inhabitants and stole many precious native artefacts, to which archived records show Hurley responding "we are accused of being pirates... this is absurd." Nasht further explains that Hurley used even more deception, claiming that he had found "the lost tribe of Israel" in his movie Pearls and Savages. To show the marketability of his deceit though, archaeologist Dr Jim Specht explains that his claim was "silly but for marketing it was brilliant." Furthermore, the documentary later reveals that despite Hurley robbing these native tribes of their culture and sacred items, the journalist's recording of the tribes has allowed modern Papuans to use these recordings as a way to rediscover and learn about their heritage. Footage of native inhabitants gathering to watch Hurley's films and enjoying their rediscovery of their heritage confirms this.

Finally, Nasht explores Hurley's final stages of his career, with his focus being on the country of Australia. Although not like his usual jobs, Hurley took a salary position working as chief cameraman at Australia's Sydney Sound Studios. At the time, the studio was well known for patriotic escapist-fare, a role perfect for Hurley's skills in evoking emotion. His work in creating The Squatter's Daughter helped in "achieving a propagandistic spin." It is here where Hurley stays until his death in 1962.

The documentary in its entirety presents the polarising aspects of Hurley's career through an unbiased presentation of both sides of the argument regarding Hurley's photos.

== Cast ==
- Linda Cropper as narrator
- John Noble as voice of Hurley
- Frank Worsley as Endurance captain
- Alasdair McGregor as himself
- Joanna Wright as herself
- Mike Gray as himself
- Dr Alf Howard as himself
- Adelie and Toni Mooy-Hurley as Themselves
- Steve Martin as himself
- Stephen Burton as himself
- Ian Affleck as himself
- Charles Bean as himself
- Dr Martyn Jolly as himself
- Dr Jim Specht as himself
- Seuna Malaki as herself
- Graham Shirley as himself
- Gael Newton as herself
- David Malouf as himself

== Production ==
Shooting locations included Macquarie Island, Ypres, The Middle East and Papua New Guinea. The film was released on 23 August 2004 in the UK and 18 November 2007 in Australia. The documentary was produced by Mitra Films. It is rated PG, indicating that the content is mild in impact.

Distribution was handled by the Australian Broadcasting Corporation (ABC) in 2004 within Australia. In the United Kingdom, the British Broadcasting Corporation (BBC) handled distribution.

== Soundtrack ==
The soundtrack to the documentary was created by Mick Harvey. The album was titled Motion Picture Music '94–'05 and included 27 tracks. The tracks are:

1. Two Guitars
2. At Nevilles Gate
3. Cicaders
4. Homecoming
5. By The River
6. Face to Face
7. Reuniting
8. Finale
9. Main Theme
10. Three Guitars
11. Noises/Fire
12. Piano Theme
13. Setting Sail
14. Antarctica
15. Things Going Wrong
16. The Man Who Made Pictures
17. In The Wars
18. Papua/New Guinea
19. Things Going Wrong Again
20. Back in Australia
21. Chimes
22. End Titles (Rosehill 2002)
23. The Stabbing
24. In The Bar
25. The Polish Market
26. In the Bar Again
27. The Farewell Song

Tracks 13–20 were used in the documentary.

== Inspiration ==
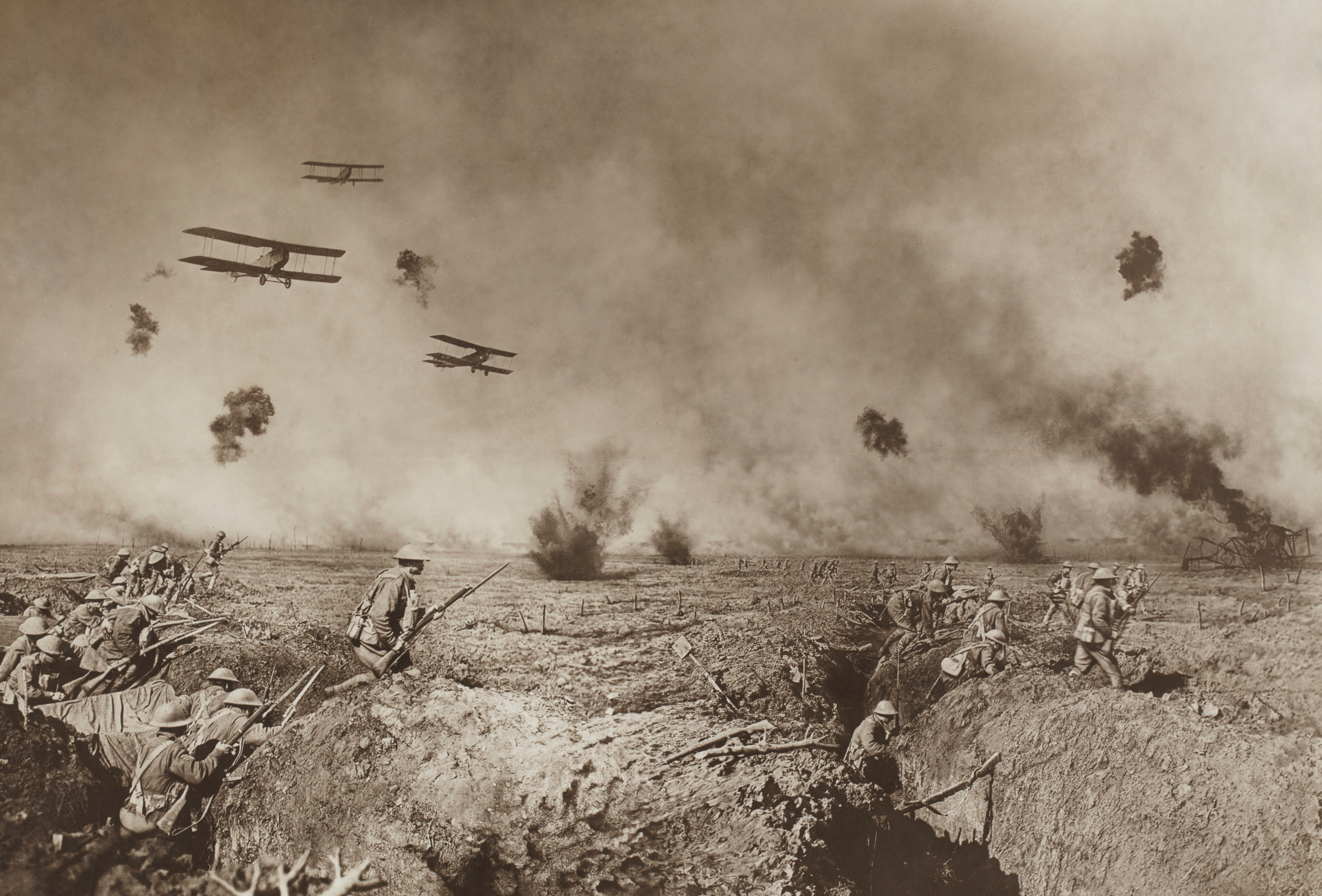
An example of Hurley's composite images used in World War 1.

Mitra Films, the production company behind the documentary, describe the reason of the production of the movie. It occurred due to the producer, Anna Cater, attending a photography exhibit showcasing Hurley's composite images. To her surprise, no notification was given to viewers as to Hurley's tampering with the photographs, as such, she resolved to produce a documentary that would carefully examine this ethical dilemma. Wholly, Cater began production of the film to demonstrate that the manipulative means used by artists remain relevant today, accomplished through an assessment of Hurley's legacy.

== Reception ==
The documentary was nominated for a Logie in 2006 for Most Outstanding Documentary series.

Additionally, the documentary has been recognised for its value in the NSW HSC, allowing students to interact with the concept of discovery whilst using the film as a medium.

The documentary is also used regularly to judge Hurley's character and his desperation at certain points in his life. His frustration to capture the perfect photo of war against the challenge of his restriction to photography and the extremely large landscape of such conflict is exemplified in the documentary to help viewers sympathise with the photographer.

== Use in the NSW HSC ==
As a text used to analyse discovery, students are taught about how the text conveys that concept. For example, some analyses suggest that the documentary forces readers to rediscover the worth of Hurley. In the area of study of discovery, the school syllabus seeks to emphasise that "discoveries can be fresh and intensely meaningful in ways that may be emotional, creative, intellectual, physical and spiritual. They can also be confronting and provocative."

Furthermore, the documentary continually contrasts both perceptions of Hurley in order to capture both sides of the argument.
