= Alice Braga =

Brazilian actress and producer (born 1983)

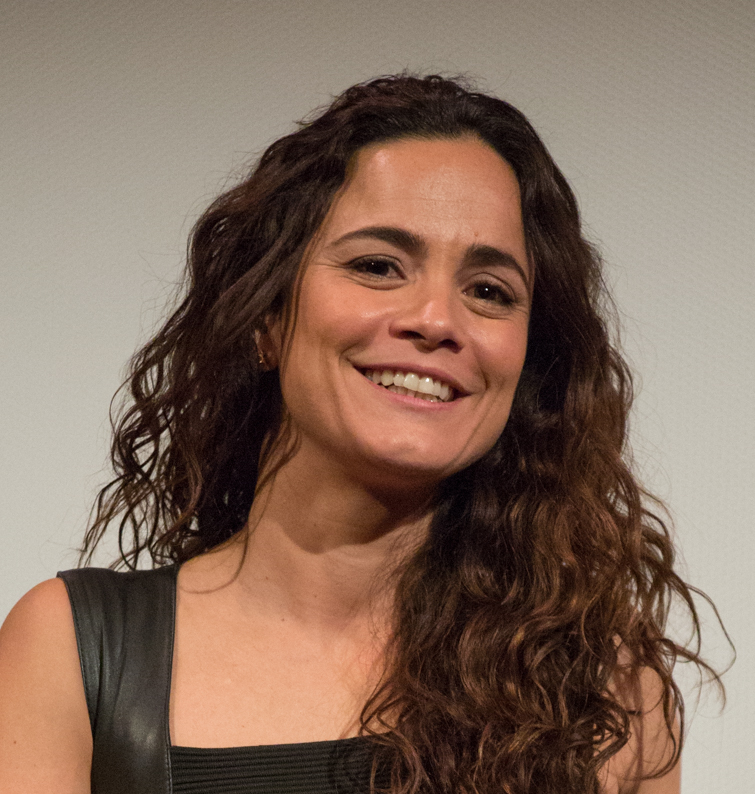
- Braga at the ATX Television Festival in 2016
- Born: Alice Braga Moraes; 15 April 1983 (age 43); São Paulo, Brazil
- Occupations: Actress; producer
- Years active: 1998–present
- Partners: Bianca Comparato (2017–2023); Renata Brandão (2024–present)
- Relatives: Sônia Braga (aunt)

Alice Braga Moraes (Brazilian Portuguese pronunciation: [aˈlisi ˈbɾaɡɐ moˈɾajs]; born April 15, 1983) is a Brazilian actress and producer. She gained international recognition for her role as Anna Montez in the American science fiction film I Am Legend (2007), alongside Will Smith.

Braga has since built a successful career in Hollywood, appearing in films such as Blindness (2008), Predators (2010), Elysium (2013), and The Suicide Squad (2021). From 2016 to 2021, she starred as Teresa Mendoza in the American television series Queen of the South.

In addition to her acting career, she has worked as a producer and remains an influential figure in both Brazilian and international cinema. Since 2024, she has starred in the Apple TV science fiction series Dark Matter. She also stars in the 2026 Netflix series Man on Fire.

== Early life ==
Alice Braga Moraes was born in São Paulo and raised in a Catholic family. She speaks fluent Portuguese, English, and Spanish.

Her exposure to acting came at an early age; both her mother Ana Braga and aunt Sônia Braga are actresses, and she often accompanied them to film sets. She began her career by appearing in school plays and commercials. Her first commercial was for yogurt when she was 8 years old. As a teenager, she began pursuing roles in television and films.

== Career ==
Braga made her acting debut in the Portuguese-language short film Trampolim (1998) and then returned to her schooling. Her breakthrough came when she was cast as Angélica in the critically acclaimed crime film City of God (2002), for which she received a Best Supporting Actress nomination from the Cinema Brazil Grand Prize. Afterward, she attended university while appearing in a pair of well-regarded Brazilian films: Lower City (2005) and Only God Knows (2006). She also appeared in the popular Brazilian television program Carandiru, Outras Historias (2005).

Braga made her English-language debut with a starring role alongside Brendan Fraser, Mos Def, and Catalina Sandino Moreno in the crime thriller Journey to the End of Night (2006), which premiered at the 5th Annual Tribeca Film Festival. She received further recognition when she was cast opposite Will Smith in the blockbuster action thriller I Am Legend (2007). She subsequently had roles in the David Mamet-directed martial arts film Redbelt (2008), alongside Chiwetel Ejiofor and Tim Allen, the post-apocalyptic thriller Blindness (2008), alongside Julianne Moore and Mark Ruffalo, and the crime drama Crossing Over (2009), alongside Harrison Ford, Ray Liotta, Jim Sturgess, and Ashley Judd.

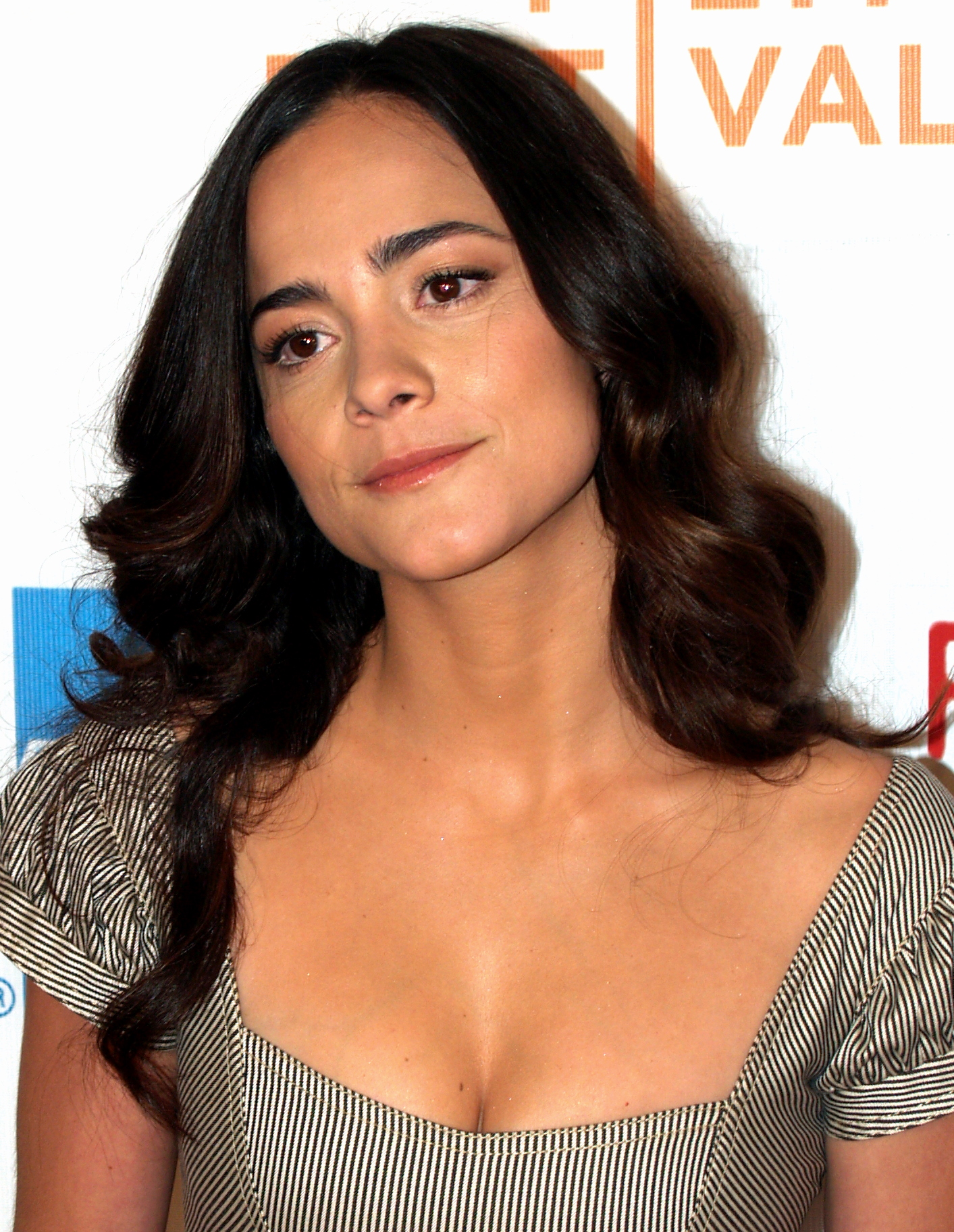
Braga at the 2008 Tribeca Film Festival

Braga portrayed Beth in the science fiction film Repo Men (2010). She starred as Isabelle in Nimród Antal's science fiction action film Predators (2010), which was shot and produced by Troublemaker Studios and Robert Rodriguez. Braga appeared as Frey Santiago in Neill Blomkamp's science fiction action film Elysium (2013), co-starring Matt Damon and Jodie Foster. In 2014, she starred as Vania in the Brazilian jungle film The Ardor, as Olivia in the Argentine romance drama Latitudes, and as Alice Taylor in Kriv Stenders' action-thriller Kill Me Three Times.

In 2016, Braga starred as Marisol Kingston in the western drama The Duel, alongside Liam Hemsworth and Woody Harrelson. In 2017, she starred as Sophia in the Christian drama The Shack, alongside Octavia Spencer and Sam Worthington, based on the novel of the same name.

From 2016 to 2021, Braga starred in the crime drama series Queen of the South, produced for USA Network, an adaptation of Arturo Perez-Reverte's best-selling novel La Reina del Sur. The series marked Braga's first lead American television role. She previously had small supporting roles in a non-English television series.

Braga starred as Cecilia Reyes in the superhero horror film The New Mutants, which was released in 2020. She starred as Maggie Teixeira in the HBO drama miniseries We Are Who We Are, which was written and directed by filmmaker Luca Guadagnino. Braga appeared in the superhero action film The Suicide Squad, which was released in August 2021.

== Personal life ==
Braga maintains residences in Los Angeles, California, and São Paulo, Brazil. She is friends with actors Diego Luna and Wagner Moura.

=== Relationships ===
In January 2020, Braga revealed she was in a relationship with actress Bianca Comparato, which began three years prior. In December 2023, it was reported that Braga and Comparato had separated.

As of February 2024, Braga is in a relationship with producer Renata Brandão.

== Filmography ==
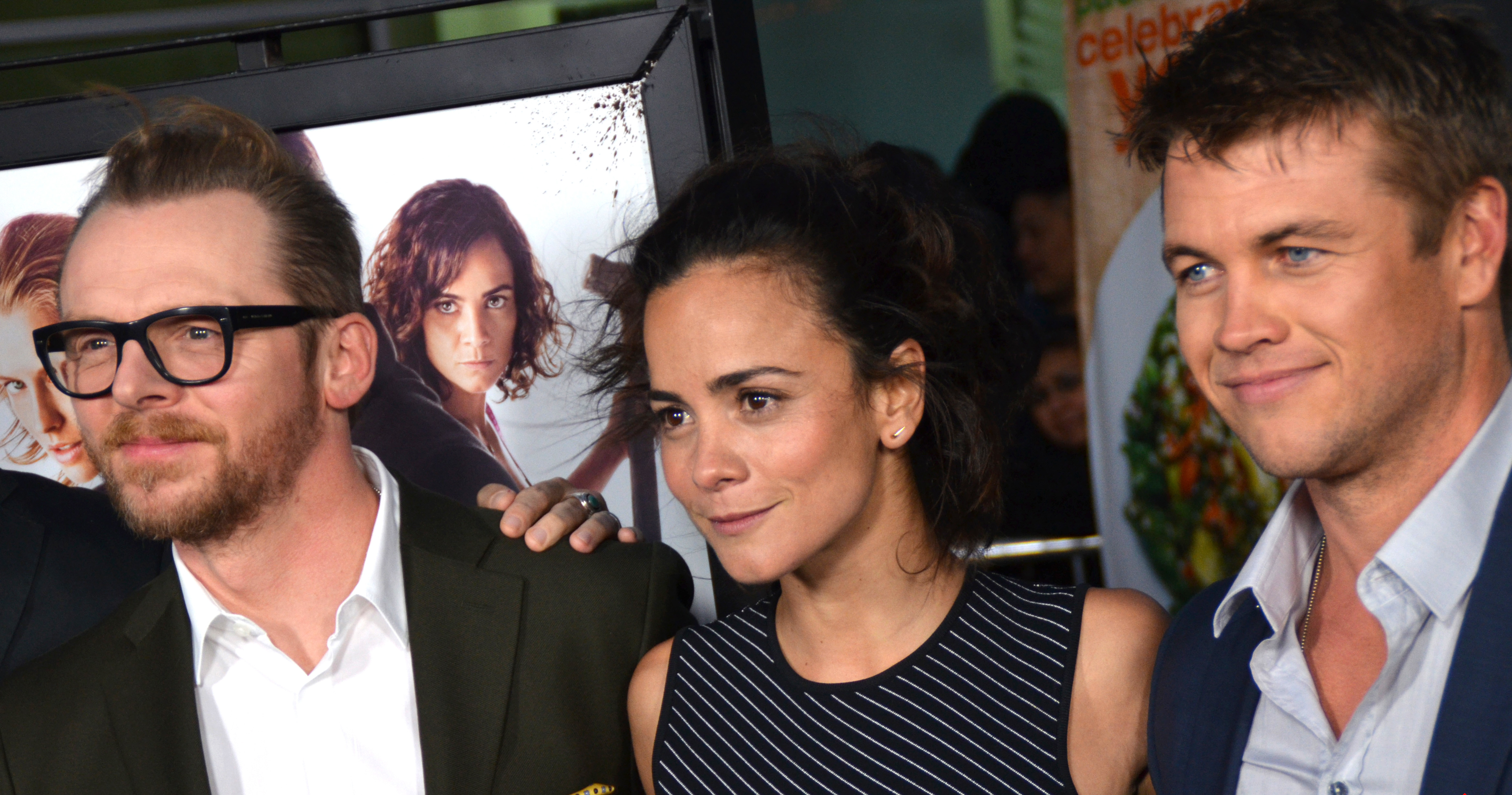
Braga with co-stars Simon Pegg and Luke Hemsworth at the Kill Me Three Times premier in March 2015

=== Film ===
Year	Title	Role	Notes
1998	Trampolim	Cláudia	Short film
2002	City of God	Angélica	
2005	Lower City	Karinna	
2006	Only God Knows	Dolores	
2006	Journey to the End of the Night	Monique	
2006	Drained	Waitress	
2007	The Milky Way	Júlia	
2007	Rummikub	Daughter from São Paulo	Short film
2007	I Am Legend	Anna Montez	
2008	Redbelt	Sondra Terry	
2008	Blindness	Woman with Dark Glasses	
2009	Crossing Over	Mireya Sanchez	
2009	Cabeça a Prêmio	Elaine	
2010	Repo Men	Beth	
2010	Predators	Isabelle	
2010	Predators: Moments of Extraction	Isabelle (voice)	Short film
2011	The Rite	Angelina Vargas	
2012	On the Road	Terry / Bea Franco	
2012	City of God – 10 Years Later	Herself	
2012	Uma Vida Inteira	Woman	Short film
2013	Elysium	Frey Santiago	
2013	Os Amigos	Júlia	
2014	Muitos Homens Num Só	Eva	
2014	Latitudes	Olivia	Also producer
2014	The Ardor	Vania	
2014	Kill Me Three Times	Alice Taylor	
2016	The Duel	Marisol Kingston	
2016	Entre Idas E Vindas	Sandra	
2017	The Shack	Sophia	
2020	Eduardo & Mônica	Mônica	
2020	The New Mutants	Cecilia Reyes	
2020	Soul	Counselor Jerry A (voice)	
2021	22 vs. Earth	Counselor Jerry A (voice)	Short film
2021	The Suicide Squad	Sol Soria	
2023	Hypnotic	Diana Cruz	
2023	Share?	#052605011	
TBA	House/Wife	Grace Sutton	Post-production

=== Television ===
Year	Title	Role	Notes
2005	Carandiru, Outras Histórias	Vânia	Episode: "Ezequiel, o Azarado"
2010	Superbonita	Host	Unknown episodes
2012	The Brazilians	Mirtes	Episode: "The Tameless from Ceará"
2014	A Mulher da Sua Vida	Roberta	Episode: "Roberta"
2016–2021	Queen of the South	Teresa Mendoza	Lead role; also executive producer
2018	Samantha!	Symantha	2 episodes; also executive producer
2019	Sintonia	None	6 episodes; producer
2020	We Are Who We Are	Maggie Teixeira	Main role
2022	Slumberkins	Sloth's Mother (voice)	4 episodes
2023	A Murder at the End of the World	Sian	Main role
2024–present	Dark Matter	Amanda	Main role
2026	Man on Fire	Valéria	Main role

=== Video games ===
Year	Title	Role
2021	Predator: Hunting Grounds	Isabelle (voice)

== Awards and nominations ==
Year	Association	Category	Nominated work	Result
2003	Cinema Brazil Grand Prize	Best Supporting Actress	City of God	Won
2005	Rio de Janeiro International Film Festival	Best Actress	Lower City	Won
2006	ACIE Awards	Best Actress	Lower City	Won
2006	São Paulo Association of Art Critics Awards	Best Actress	Lower City	Won
2006	SESC Film Festival	Audience Award Best Actress	Lower City	Won
2006	SESC Film Festival	Critics Award Best Actress	Lower City	Won
2006	Verona Love Screens Film Festival	Best Acting Performance	Lower City	Won
2006	Prêmio Contigo Cinema	Best Actress	Lower City	Won
2007	Cinema Brazil Grand Prize	Best Actress	Lower City	Won
2008	Black Reel Awards	Best Supporting Actress	Blindness	Nominated
2008	SESC Film Festival	Audience Award Best Actress	The Milky Way	Won
2008	Cinema Brazil Grand Prize	Best Supporting Actress	Drained	Nominated
2009	Cinema Brazil Grand Prize	Best Supporting Actress	Blindness	Nominated
2009	Rio de Janeiro International Film Festival	Best Actress	Cabeça a Prêmio	Won
2010	Festival de Cinema de Punta del Este	Best Actress	Cabeça a Prêmio	Won
2011	Cinema Brazil Grand Prize	Best Actress	Cabeça a Prêmio	Nominated
2014	Cine PE	Best Actress	Muitos Homens Num Só	Won
2015	Cinema Brazil Grand Prize	Best Supporting Actress	Os Amigos	Nominated
2016	Cinema Brazil Grand Prize	Best Actress	Muitos Homens Num Só	Nominated
2017	Cinema Brazil Grand Prize	Best Supporting Actress	Entre Idas e Vidas	Nominated
2017	Imagen Foundation Awards	Best Actress – Television	Queen of the South	Nominated
2018	Imagen Foundation Awards	Best Actress – Television	Queen of the South	Nominated
2019	Imagen Foundation Awards	Best Actress – Television	Queen of the South	Nominated
2020	Imagen Foundation Awards	Best Actress – Television	Queen of the South	Nominated
2021	Imagen Foundation Awards	Best Actress – Television	Queen of the South	Nominated
