= The Ardor =

2014 film

- Theatrical release poster
- Directed by: Pablo Fendrik
- Screenplay by: Pablo Fendrik
- Produced by: Natalia Videla Pena; Gael García Bernal; Juan Pablo García
- Starring: Gael García Bernal; Alice Braga; Chico Díaz
- Cinematography: Julián Apezteguia
- Edited by: Leandro Aste
- Music by: Sebastián Escofet
- Production companies: Magma Cine; Bananeira Filmes; Manny Films; Canana Films
- Distributed by: Bac Films International
- Release date: 19 May 2014 (Cannes)
- Running time: 110 minutes
- Countries: United States; Argentina; Mexico; Brazil; France
- Languages: Spanish; English

The Ardor (original title: El Ardor) is a 2014 American Western film, written and directed by Pablo Fendrik. It stars Gael García Bernal as a lone shaman who rescues a kidnapped woman from mercenaries who kill her farmer father and take over her property.

The film premiered on May 19, 2014, at 2014 Cannes Film Festival out of competition, at "special screening" section. It was also one of the Argentinian films which were in consideration to send as Argentina's official entry for 87th Academy Awards for Best Foreign Language Film but ultimately Wild Tales was selected.

== Premise ==
A mysterious, lone Amazon shaman named Kaí, rescued the daughter of a tobacco farmer who was killed by a band of deforesters and exact revenge from them.

== Cast ==
- Gael García Bernal as Kaí
- Alice Braga as Vania
- Chico Díaz
- Claudio Tolcachir as Tarquinho
- Jorge Sesán
- Iván Steinhardt

== Releases ==
After its premiere at Cannes, the film screened at Sitges International Fantastic Film Festival on October 9, 2014. It was later shown at Morelia International Film Festival on October 24, 2014.

== Reception ==
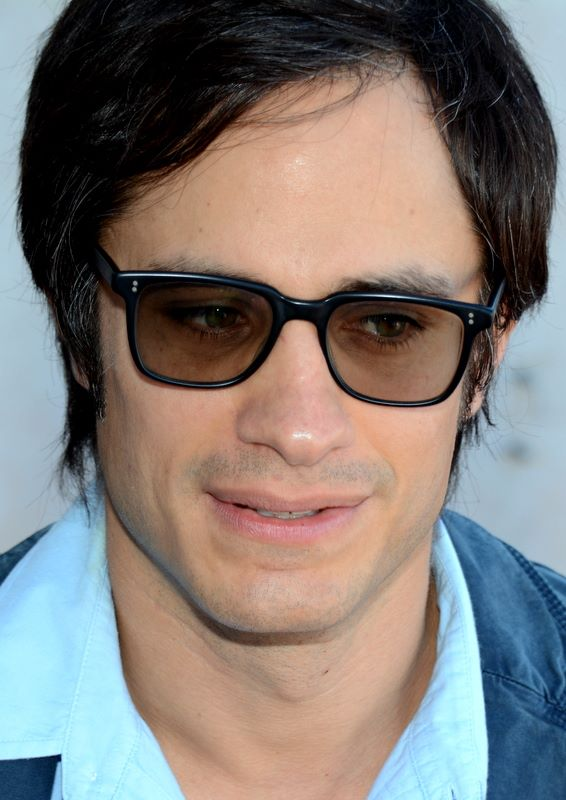
Gael García Bernal at the photocall of film at 2014 Cannes Film Festival.

The film received mixed to negative reviews from critics, upon its premiere at Cannes. David Rooney of The Hollywood Reporter gave the film a mixed and said that "Despite the fiery passion implicit in its title, this rumble in the jungle lacks heat." In his review for Variety, Peter Debruge said that "Fendrik’s unusual genre exercise builds in arduous slow-motion toward a thrilling grindhouse climax, but lacks the hair-raising tension a more unsettling sound mix could create — though a slash-and-burn re-edit."

Fionnuala Halligan of Screen International in her review said that the film "looks bewitching, the banks of the Parana River shrouded in mist and vegetation. Cinematographer Julian Apezteguia switches tack to handle the showdown gunfight in a classic, dust-driven Western manner, and the interludes featuring the local jaguar are particularly attractive." But ultimately called the film "an atmospheric if slightly plodding jungle revenge romp."

Cine.gr gave the film two and a half star out of five and said that "Pablo Fendrik has things to say and delivers a film rich in content and technically perfect, but loses the opportunity for great cinema, due to weaknesses of the script."

CineTradicional in its review said about the performance that "Gael, who along with the gorgeous Alice Braga, delivered a couple of interesting and committed performances." But concluded that "the director, who in his claim fails to show a stance."

Mediapart gave the film a negative review by saying that "At first glance, the choice to place the action in the very current phenomenon of violent dispossession of land made against different Amazonian populations, was wise. Because in addition to telling a story to an audience, then there was the desire to warn about this area of law not intolerable to the international community. But the film does little case of social reality. In addition, the cast is limited to professional actors: no room for extras that could embody this reality. The film does not keep his promise made by the director of waking awareness about the seriousness of the context of Amazon deforestation."

== Accolades ==
The film received 10 nominations from Argentine Academy of Cinematography Arts and Sciences Awards in 2014.

Year	Group/Award	Category	Recipient	Result	Ref.
2014	Argentine Academy of Cinematography Arts and Sciences Awards	Best Film	Pablo Fendrik	Nominated	
2014	Argentine Academy of Cinematography Arts and Sciences Awards	Best Director	Pablo Fendrik	Nominated	
2014	Argentine Academy of Cinematography Arts and Sciences Awards	Best Original Screenplay	Pablo Fendrik	Nominated	
2014	Argentine Academy of Cinematography Arts and Sciences Awards	Best Cinematography	Julián Apezteguia	Nominated	
2014	Argentine Academy of Cinematography Arts and Sciences Awards	Best Editing	Leandro Aste	Nominated	
2014	Argentine Academy of Cinematography Arts and Sciences Awards	Best Music	Sebastián Escofet	Nominated	
2014	Argentine Academy of Cinematography Arts and Sciences Awards	Best Art Direction	Micaela Saiegh	Nominated	
2014	Argentine Academy of Cinematography Arts and Sciences Awards	Best Costume Design	Kika Lopes	Nominated	
2014	Argentine Academy of Cinematography Arts and Sciences Awards	Best Make Up	Martín Macías Trujillo	Nominated	
2014	Argentine Academy of Cinematography Arts and Sciences Awards	Best Sound	Leandro de Loredo	Nominated	
