= Gael García Bernal =

Mexican actor and filmmaker (born 1978)

- Bernal in 2026
- Born: 30 November 1978 (age 47); Guadalajara, Jalisco, Mexico
- Education: National Autonomous University of Mexico; Royal Central School of Speech and Drama (BA); European Graduate School
- Occupations: Actor; filmmaker
- Years active: 1989–present
- Children: 3
- Parents: José Ángel García (father); Patricia Bernal (mother)
- Relatives: Darío Yazbek Bernal (half-brother)

Gael García Bernal (Note: In this Mexican name, the surname is García and the second or maternal family name is Bernal.) (Latin American Spanish: [ɡaˈel ɣaɾˈsi.a βeɾˈnal]; born 30 November 1978) is a Mexican actor and filmmaker. He has received various accolades including a Golden Globe Award and an Ariel Award. He is known for his performances in the films Amores perros (2000), Y tu mamá también (2001), Bad Education (2004), The Motorcycle Diaries (2004), Babel (2006), Coco (2017), Old (2021), Cassandro (2023) and Magellan (2025).

On television, he portrayed music conductor Rodrigo De Souza in the series Mozart in the Jungle (2014–2018) and Shakespearian actor Arthur Leander in the miniseries Station Eleven (2021–2022), and starred as the titular character in the Disney+ Marvel Studios Special Presentation Werewolf by Night (2022). He is set to produce and star in the upcoming series The Boys: Mexico for The Boys franchise along with Diego Luna.

García Bernal was nominated for a BAFTA Award for Best Actor in a Leading Role for his portrayal of a young Che Guevara in The Motorcycle Diaries in 2005, and in 2016 won his first Golden Globe Award for Best Actor – Television Series Musical or Comedy for Mozart in the Jungle. He and fellow actor Diego Luna founded the production company Canana Films in Mexico City. In 2016, Time magazine named him in the annual Time 100 most influential people list. In 2020, The New York Times ranked him No. 25 in its list of the 25 Greatest Actors of the 21st Century.

== Early life ==
García Bernal was born in Guadalajara, Jalisco, Mexico, the son of Patricia Bernal, an actress and former model, and José Ángel García, an actor and director. His stepfather is Sergio Yazbek, whom his mother married when García Bernal was young. He started acting at just one year old and spent most of his teen years starring in telenovelas. García Bernal and frequent collaborator Diego Luna were friends from childhood in Mexico City.

When he was fourteen, García Bernal taught indigenous people in Mexico to read, often working with the Huichol people. At the age of fifteen, he took part in peaceful demonstrations in support of the Zapatista uprising of 1994.

He began studying philosophy at UNAM, Mexico's national university but, during a prolonged student strike, he decided to take a sabbatical to travel around Europe. He then moved to London, and became the first Mexican accepted to study at the Central School of Speech and Drama. Bernal also attended the European Graduate School toward a master's in media and communication.

== Career ==
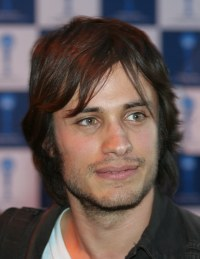
Bernal at the 40th Karlovy Vary International Film Festival in 2005

After García Bernal's success in soap operas, Mexican director Alejandro González Iñárritu offered García Bernal a part in his feature directorial debut, Amores perros (2000). The film won rave reviews, and was nominated for an Academy Award for Best Foreign Language Film.

His next role was Alfonso Cuarón's Y tu mamá también (2001), which was a crossover success into American markets and gained him notice on the international stage, becoming the second-highest grossing Spanish language film in the United States. The next year, García Bernal went on to portray Argentine revolutionary Che Guevara in the 2002 TV miniseries Fidel and the morally troubled Father Amaro in the Mexican box-office record-breaker El crimen del Padre Amaro (2002). García Bernal again portrayed Che Guevara in The Motorcycle Diaries (2004), an adaptation of a journal the 23-year-old Guevara wrote about his travels across South America. The film broke the box office record set 3 years prior by Y tu mamá también, and garnered Bernal a BAFTA nomination in 2005 for Best Performance by an Actor.

He also did some theatre work, during this time, including a 2005 production of Bodas de Sangre, by Federico García Lorca, in the Almeida Theatre in London. García Bernal has worked for acclaimed directors including González Iñárritu, Pedro Almodóvar, Walter Salles, Alfonso Cuarón, Michel Gondry, and Iciar Bollaín, among others. He has taken on roles in English-language films, including the Gondry-directed The Science of Sleep and The King, for which he earned rave reviews.

García Bernal directed his first feature film, Déficit which was released in 2007. He was cast in the 2008 film Blindness, an adaptation of the 1995 novel of the same name by José Saramago, winner of the Nobel Prize, about a society suffering an epidemic of blindness. As in the novel, the characters have only descriptions, no names or histories; while director Fernando Meirelles said some actors were intimidated by the concept of playing such characters, "'With Gael,' he said, 'I never think about the past. I just think what my character wants.'" García Bernal again paired with Diego Luna in Rudo y Cursi directed by Carlos Cuarón.

García Bernal and Diego Luna own Canana Films. The company recently joined with Golden Phoenix Productions to produce a number of television documentaries about the unsolved murders of more than 300 women in the border city of Ciudad Juarez. In May 2010, García Bernal did a cameo appearance as himself playing Cristiano Ronaldo in Ronaldo: The Movie for the Nike advertisement, Write the Future.

In 2010, he co-directed with Marc Siver four short films in collaboration with Amnesty International. The tetralogy, called "Los Invisibles", is about migrants from Central America in Mexico, their journey and risks, their hopes, and what they can contribute to Mexico, the US and the world. He directed the movies, did the interviews and also narrates the four short movies. He starred in Even the Rain (2010), Spain's official entry for the 2011 Academy Awards.

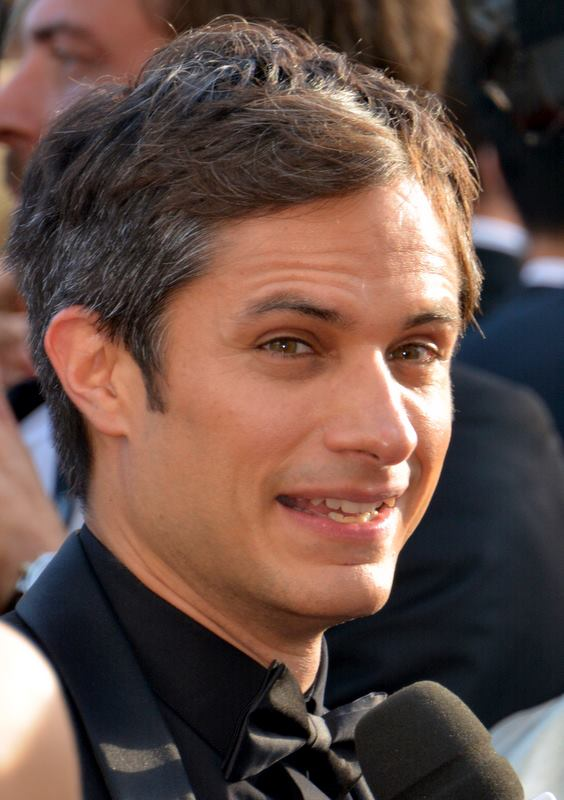
Bernal at the 2016 Cannes Film Festival

García Bernal narrated Human Planet for Hispanic audiences, which premiered on Discovery en Español on 25 April 2011 and aired on Discovery Channel in Latin America on 12 May. For the third time García Bernal appeared with Diego Luna in the American Spanish-language comedy film Casa de mi padre, opposite Will Ferrell, where he played a feared drug lord. García Bernal's next projects included a film adaptation of José Agustín's Ciudades Desiertas and the Jon Stewart directorial biopic Rosewater, in which he portrayed Maziar Bahari to widespread critical acclaim. He was set to star in the 20th Century Fox reboot Zorro film called Zorro Reborn. The script is by Glen Gers, Lee Shipman, and Brian McGeevy.

In April 2014, he was announced as a member of the main competition jury at the 2014 Cannes Film Festival. In June 2014, he began production as the star of the dramatic comedy Zoom, directed by Pedro Morelli. In 2014, he was cast in the lead role of Rodrigo de Souza in the Amazon Studios comedy-drama television series Mozart in the Jungle. His performance in the show was met with rave reviews, earning him a Golden Globe Award in 2016.

In 2016, he starred in two movies that were submitted for the Academy Award for Best Foreign Language Film, Desierto (Mexico) and Neruda (Chile). In 2017, he was announced as a member of the U.S. Dramatic Jury at the 2017 Sundance Film Festival. That same year, he provided the voice of Héctor, an undead trickster and one of the main protagonists of the Pixar animated film Coco.

García Bernal founded The Ambulante Documentary Film Festival, which works to bring documentary films to places where they are rarely shown, and helped to create the Amnesty International Short Documentary Series Los Invisibles. For this work, he was awarded the Washington Office on Latin America's Human Rights Award in 2011.

In October 2019, García Bernal and Diego Luna announced they were joining the Creative Advisory Board for TV and Film development company EXILE Content along with Adam Grant.

In 2021, García Bernal starred in the M. Night Shyamalan thriller Old. In November 2021, Bernal was cast in the Disney+ special Werewolf by Night by Marvel Studios, based on the comics character of the same name.

In 2024, he starred alongside close friend and frequent collaborator Diego Luna in the Hulu original miniseries La Máquina as the eponymous character.

In 2025, García Bernal starred as Ferdinand Magellan in the epic historical drama film Magellan, which was directed by Lav Diaz; the film was an international co-production between the Philippines, Spain, Portugal, Taiwan, and France. The film premiered at the 2025 Cannes Film Festival and was announced as the Philippines' official submission for Best International Feature Film at the 98th Academy Awards.

== Personal life ==
García Bernal and Argentine actress Dolores Fonzi met on the set of Private Lives in 2001. On 8 January 2009 their son was born in Madrid, Spain. Their daughter was born on 4 April 2011 in Buenos Aires, Argentina. As of 2015 he divides his time between Buenos Aires and Mexico City.

He has been in a relationship with Mexican journalist Fernanda Aragonés since 2019. They had a child on 30 September 2021.

He has described himself as "culturally Catholic but spiritually agnostic".

== Filmography ==
=== Film ===
Key
†	Denotes productions that have not yet been released

Year	Title	Role	Notes
1996	De tripas, corazón	Martín	Short film
2000	Amores perros	Octavio	
2000	Cerebro	Iván	Short film
2001	Don't Tempt Me	Davenport	
2001	The Last Post	José Francisco	Short film
2001	Vidas privadas	Gustavo "Gana" Bertolini	
2001	Y tu mamá también	Julio Zapata	
2001	El ojo en la nuca	Pablo Urrutia	Short film
2002	Fidel	Ernesto "Che" Guevara	
2002	I'm with Lucy	Gabriel	
2002	The Crime of Father Amaro	Padre Amaro	
2003	Cuba Libre	Ricky	
2003	Dot the I	Kit Winter	
2004	Bad Education	Ángel / Juan / Zahara	
2004	The Motorcycle Diaries	Ernesto "Che" Guevara	
2005	The King	Elvis Valderez	
2006	Babel	Santiago	
2006	The Science of Sleep	Stéphane	
2007	Déficit	Cristobal	Also director and producer
2007	The Past	Rímini	
2008	8	—N/a	Director, writer and producer; Segment: "The Letter"
2008	Blindness	King of Ward 3	
2008	Rudo y Cursi	Tatto	
2009	Sin Nombre	—N/a	Producer
2009	Mammoth	Leo Vidales	
2009	The Limits of Control	Mexican	
2010	Los Invisibles		
2010	Letters to Juliet	Victor	
2010	Even the Rain	Sebastián	
2010	José and Pilar	Himself	Documentary
2011	Miss Bala	—N/a	Producer
2011	A Little Bit of Heaven	Julian Goldstein	
2011	Casa de mi padre	Onza	
2011	The Loneliest Planet	Alex	
2012	No	René Saavedra	
2012	Vamps	Diego Bardem	
2013	Paradise	-	Producer
2013	Who is Dayani Cristal?	Himself	Documentary
2014	The Ardor	Kaí	
2014	Cesar Chavez	Himself	Cameo; Also producer
2014	Rosewater	Maziar Bahari	
2015	The Empty Classroom	Narrator	Documentary; Also producer
2015	Desierto	Moises	
2015	Zoom	Edward Deacon	
2015	Eva Doesn't Sleep	Emilio Eduardo Massera	
2016	Madly	—N/a	Director and writer; Segment: "The Love of My Life"
2016	Neruda	Oscar Peluchoneau	
2016	Salt and Fire	Dr. Fabio Cavani	
2016	You're Killing Me Susana	Eligio	
2017	If You Saw His Heart	Daniel	
2017	Coco	Héctor Rivera (voice)	
2018	The Kindergarten Teacher	Simon	
2018	Museum	Juan Nuñez	Also executive producer
2018	The Accused	Mario Elmo	
2019	Birders	—N/a	Executive producer
2019	Chicuarotes	—N/a	Director
2019	Ema	Gastón	
2019	It Must Be Heaven	Himself	
2019	Wasp Network	Gerardo Hernández	
2021	Old	Guy Cappa	
2022	This One Summer	Thiago	
2023	Cassandro	Cassandro	
2023	The Mother	Hector Álvarez	
2024	Another End	Sal	
2025	Holland	Dave Delgado	
2025	Magellan	Ferdinand Magellan	
2026	The End of It	Diego	
2026	Hombre al agua	TBA	Director and writer
2026	Zero A. D.: The Birth of Christ †	Joachim	Completed
TBA	The Ballad of the Phoenix †	King Terrowyn (voice)	In production
TBA	Nada Entre Los Dos †	TBA	Post-production
TBA	Monkey Hill †	TBA	Post-production

=== Television ===
Year	Title	Role	Notes
1989	Teresa	Peluche	3 episodes
1992	El abuelo y yo	Daniel García Medina	Lead role (90 episodes)
2000	Queen of Swords	Churi	1 episode ("Honor Thy Father")
2006	Soy tu fan	Emilio	1 episode ("¡Que viva México!")
2014–2018	Mozart in the Jungle	Rodrigo de Souza	Lead role (40 episodes)
2021–2022	Station Eleven	Arthur Leander	Miniseries
2022	Werewolf by Night	Jack Russell / Werewolf by Night	Lead role, Disney+television special
2024	La Máquina	Esteban "La Máquina" Osuna	Lead role, miniseries; also executive producer

== Awards ==
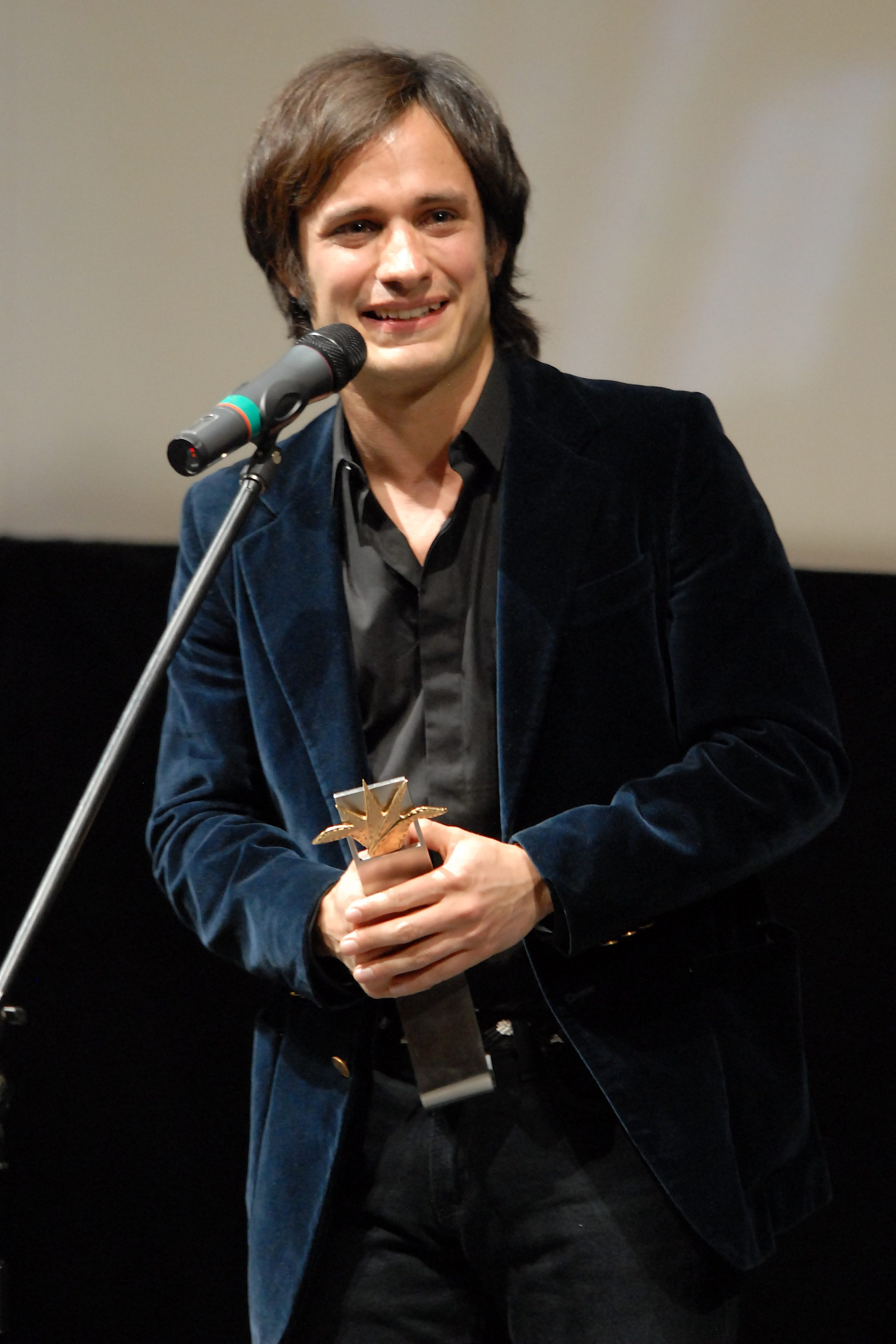
Gael García Bernal at the Guadalajara Film Festival

Ariel Award

Year	Category	Title	Result	Ref
2001	Best Actor (Mejor Actor)	Amores Perros	Won	
2017	Best Actor (Mejor Actuación Masculina)	You're Killing Me Susana	Nominated	
2019	Best Actor (Mejor Actuación Masculina)	Museo	Nominated	

BAFTA Awards

Year	Category	Title	Result	Ref
2005	Best Actor	The Motorcycle Diaries	Nominated	
2006	Rising Star	—N/a	Nominated	

Cannes Film Festival

Year	Category	Title	Result	Ref
2003	Chopard Trophy	—N/a	Won	
2007	Caméra d'Or	Déficit	Nominated	

Golden Globe Awards

Year	Category	Title	Result	Ref
2016	Best Actor – Television Series Musical or Comedy	Mozart in the Jungle	Won	
2017	Best Actor – Television Series Musical or Comedy	Mozart in the Jungle	Nominated	

Goya Awards

Year	Category	Title	Result	Ref
2002	Best Supporting Actor	Don't Tempt Me	Nominated	

Other honors

Year	Ceremony	Category	Title	Result
2000	Chicago International Film Festival	Best Actor	Amores perros	Won
2001	El Heraldo de México	Best Actor	Y Tu Mamá También	Nominated
2001	Venice Film Festival	Marcello Mastroianni Award (shared with Diego Luna)	Y Tu Mamá También	Won
2002	Cinema Writers Circle Awards, Spain	Best Supporting Actor (Mejor Actor Secundario)	Don't Tempt Me	Nominated
2003	Chicago Film Critics Association Awards	Most Promising Performer	The Crime of Father Amaro, Y Tu Mamá También	Nominated
2003	Chlotrudis Awards	Best Actor	Y Tu Mamá También	Nominated
2005	ACE Awards New York	Best Actor	The Motorcycle Diaries	Nominated
2005	Cinema Writers Circle Awards, Spain	Best Actor (Mejor Actor)	Bad Education	Nominated
2005	Chlotrudis Awards	Best Actor	Bad Education	Won
2006	Awards Circuit Community Awards	Best Cast Ensemble	Babel	Nominated
2007	Broadcast Film Critics Association Awards	Best Acting Ensemble	Babel	Nominated
2007	Alma Awards	Outstanding Actor – Motion Picture	Babel	Nominated
2007	Chlotrudis Awards	Best Actor	The Science of Sleep	Nominated
2009	Cinema Brazil Grand Prize	Best Supporting Actor (Melhor Ator Coadjuvante)	Blindness	Nominated
2009	Premios Oye!	Popular Breakthrough of the Year	Rudo y Cursi	Won
2009	Premios Oye!	Best theme for a film	Rudo y Cursi	Nominated
2009	Mayahuel de Plata Awards	Achievement Award	Himself	Won
2010	Premios Juventud	Can He Act or What?	Rudo y Cursi	Nominated
2012	Abu Dhabi Film Festival	Best Actor	No	Won
2013	Cork International Film Festival	Audience Award	Who is Dayani Cristal?	Won
2013	Dublin Film Critics Circle Awards	Best Actor	No	Nominated
2014	Chlotrudis Awards	Best Actor	No	Nominated

In January 2026 he was appointed as Officer of the French Legion of Honor by the French Government.

== Discography ==
=== Collaborations ===
Year	Song	Album
2007	"Cristobal" (with Devendra Banhart)	Smokey Rolls Down Thunder Canyon
2016	"Before The Sunset" (with Compass)	Compass

=== Soundtracks ===
Year	Song	Album
1992	"Vagabundo"	El abuelo y yo
1992	"Anselmo"	El abuelo y yo
2006	"If You Rescue Me (Chanson des Chats)" (with Sacha Bourdo, Alain Chabat and Aurelia Petit)	The Science of Sleep
2008	"Quiero que me quieras"	Rudo y Cursi
2010	"A Morte De Pé Em Palco" (with José Saramago)	José e Pilar (Banda Sonora Original)
2017	"Everyone Knows Juanita"	Coco (Original Motion Picture Soundtrack)
2017	"Un poco loco" (with Anthony Gonzalez)	Coco (Original Motion Picture Soundtrack)
2017	"Remember Me (Lullaby)" (with Gabriella Flores and Libertad García Fonzi)	Coco (Original Motion Picture Soundtrack)
2017	"Juanita"	Coco (Banda Sonora Original)
2017	"Un poco loco" (with Luis Ánge Gómez Jaramillo)	Coco (Banda Sonora Original)
2017	"Recuérdame (Arrullo)" (with Lucy Hernández)	Coco (Banda Sonora Original)

== See also ==
- Cinema of Mexico
