= Déficit =

- Film poster
- Directed by: Gael García Bernal
- Written by: Kyzza Terrazas
- Produced by: Gael García Bernal; Pablo Cruz; Diego Luna
- Starring: Gael García Bernal; Luz Cipriota; Tenoch Huerta Mejía; Camila Sodi
- Release date: 21 May 2007
- Running time: 79 minutes
- Country: Mexico
- Language: Spanish

Déficit is a 2007 Mexican drama film directed by Gael García Bernal in his directorial debut. It was written by Kyzza Terrazas and debuted at the Cannes Film Festival on 21 May 2007.

In the film the lives of the rich Cristobal and his sister are contrasted with those of the servants on the estate. However, the riches are from illegal sources it would seem, and his father is on the run in Europe. In particular it is made clear that his childhood friend Adan, is now firmly kept in his place as the family gardener, and is no longer treated as a friend.

== Plot ==
It tells the story of a rich young man, Cristobal, and his friends throwing a house party over the course of a weekend at his parents' home in Tepoztlán. It is implied through murmurings that his father is in Europe trying to settle finances and avoid corruption charges. At the beginning of the film, he is driven to the house by one of his Indian servants. They drive through a group of protesters without ever really wondering what they are protesting about. His hippie sister, Elisa, has already invaded the place with her drug-addled friends hailing from places such as Brazil and Japan. The two groups seem disparate but it's nothing that can't be resolved through sharing alcohol and marijuana. Already at the house is a family who work as the groundskeepers and Adan, also a twenty-something who has grown up with them but works for them, creating an uncomfortable atmosphere as Cristobal barks out orders.

Cristobal and Adan vie for the attention of Dolores, an Argentine girl at the party whose family has also escaped Argentina due to financial problems. Cris also struggles with his girlfriend, Mafer, constantly phoning him and finding out that he didn't get into Harvard University, where his father wanted him to go. When he finds out that Adan did get into a university in the United States, their rivalry grows even greater. During a football match in the garden, Cris purposely fouls Adan, showing his bitterness.

Cris and Dolores grow close and begin kissing, only to be interrupted by one of Mafer's phone calls. That night, a rave is held. Elisa, on an ecstasy trip, wanders into the garden and finds Adan sitting in a tree on the perimeter, as he had returned to observe their antics after he had already left. She kisses him, but then begins to overdose. She calls for Cristobal and he takes her into the house and blames Adan for what has happened. Cristobel starts a fight with Adan but is overpowered, and in frustration calls Adan an Indio, as a derogatory, deeply hurting Adan and reinforcing their differences. Elisa insists that he should not take her to a hospital. He finds she has been given three pills by one of the boys and the guests are asked to leave. Mafer then turns up, furious that he has been flirting with other women while she was trying to get to the party (Cris having ignored her phone call asking to come and pick her up). Cris receives a mobile phone call, which he can see is from his father, but he doesn't answer it and bursts into tears. The day saw him rejected from Harvard, lose his girlfriend (and Dolores) and his sister overdose on ecstasy, with the rift from his parents firmly entrenched and the differences between Adan perceived

== Cast ==
- Gael García Bernal as Cristobal
- Luz Cipriota as Dolores
- Tenoch Huerta Mejía as Adan
- Camila Sodi as Elisa
