= The Well (2013 film) =

The Well (Spanish: Manto acuífero) is a 2013 Mexican slice of life drama film by the Australian director Michael Rowe.

== Plot ==
A little girl moves to a new home in another town with her mother and abusive stepfather, and suffers from missing her caring father.

== Cast ==
- Tania Arredondo as Mamá
- Zaili Sofia Macias as Caro
- Arnoldo Picazzo as Felipe

== Production ==
The film is based on the short story "Secrets" by Australian author Tim Winton.

== Release ==
The Well screened in competition at the Morelia Film Festival in Morelia, Mexico.
