= Sebastián Escofet =

Argentine composer (born 1968)

Sebastián Escofet (La Plata, 1968) is an Argentine film music composer and musician.

== Biography ==
At the age of 5, after long listening sessions in his grandfather Luciano's study, he knew music was his calling. At the age of 12 he decided to buy his first electric guitar, inspired by a poster of Pappo that decorated a schoolmate's bedroom. Poor grades forced him to be a self-taught composer up until 18, when he managed to start studying with certain formality & uncertain success. Along the path of musical learning & experimentation he has collaborated with artists like Chango Spasiuk, Gustavo Cerati, Los Estelares, Fabiana Cantilo, Ulises Butron, Jorge Drexler, Los 7 Delfines, Philip Glass, Kronos Quartet, Ezequiel Borra & Mussa Phelps, to name a few.

He composed the soundtrack for over 15 movies which participated in the most important film festivals in the world. He collaborated with Gustavo Santaolalla in 21 Grams & Biutiful, films directed by Alejandro González Iñarritu. He's performed live at festivals like Sonar, Netmage, Barcelona Forum & Multiplicidade.

He travels the world with his guitar, he collects instruments from each of the places he visits & he counts the days remaining before he can return to the ski tracks.

== Discography ==
2020 Crimenes de Familia (soundtrack)
2020 Gralunar
2019 Ambientalismo
2019 El Universo en Miniatura Vol 1
2016 El Hilo Rojo (soundtrack)
2009 Núcleos
2009 Horizontal / Vertical (soundtrack)
2008 Lluvia (soundtrack)
2008 Cordero de Dios (soundtrack)
2008 Las Vidas Posibles (soundtrack)
2009 El ultimo verano de la boyita (soundtrack)
2008 Siberiana
2008 El tunel del Juego
2006 Pura Sangre (soundtrack)
2006 Diversión
2005 Suite Patagónica
2004 Próxima Salida (soundtrack)
2004 Juego Divino
2003 Ahora
2000 Meditaciones
