= Smith & Nasht =

Smith & Nasht is an Australian media production company formed by serial entrepreneur Dick Smith and filmmaker Simon Nasht. The company was established in 2010 and has specialised in "global issue" films. As of 2019, topics have included energy, climate change, science, natural history, over-population and cybercrime. Smith&Nasht's first film – I Can Change Your Mind About Climate – aired on Australian Broadcasting Corporation (ABC) television in 2012 and was followed by a high rating episode of the TV discussion show, Q&A.

Co-founder Dick Smith retired from the company in 2013 and no longer has any shareholding or management role.

== Simon Nasht ==
Nasht is a film producer and former journalist. Honours garnered by his work include a Prix Jules Verne for international history film of the year in 2002, a Logie and Australian Writer's Guild and Director's Guild awards. In 2009, he received a shared Eureka Prize for Science Journalism. Nasht has written and directed some of the highest rated documentaries for the year for the ABC, including a film about the Sydney Harbour Bridge and Dick Smith’s Population Puzzle. The hour-long Q&A talk show panel that followed the latter was the highest rating show of its kind on Australian television, according to the ABC. Nasht's films have raised the profile of several Australians, including photographer Frank Hurley in The Man Who Made History, Tasmanian Devil, which focused respectively on Hurley and actor Errol Flynn and Voyage of the Nautilus, which focused on Sir Hubert Wilkins about whom Nasht also authored two books: The Last Explorer and No More Beyond.

In 2014, Nasht criticised Government cuts to documentary funding through Screen Australia stating:,"Documentary has been hit with a totally unjustified cut of more than $2 million while feature film remains a protected species mired in failure."

=== Howard on Menzies (2016) ===
In March 2015, Nasht announced he would work with Stuart Menzies (the former head of ABC TV Content and Creative Development) and former Prime Minister John Howard on a two part series for ABC TV entitled Howard on Menzies: The Making of Modern Australia. Stuart Menzies brought the concept to Nasht and the pair then approached Howard with it. Nasht has said of the project:

“Howard is very hands on, has an encyclopaedic knowledge of the era and the personalities and has an absolute passion for the art of politics. It is a true collaboration but ultimately the opinions being expressed are Mr Howard's.”

== Film productions by topic ==
=== Environmental films ===
==== I Can Change Your Mind About Climate (2012) ====
I can change your mind about climate was an ABC1 TV event designed to kick-start a national conversation about climate change. Representing two extremes of position on the topic and separated by a generation, the documentary featured conservative former Liberal party senator Nick Minchin and climate activist, founder of the Australian Youth Climate Coalition and author, Anna Rose as competing protagonists. They shared a "journey of mutual discovery" to see if they could change each other's mind about climate change, its causes and impacts. The one-hour long documentary was followed by a live studio audience discussion on the ABC TV program, Q&A. The production was directed by Max Bourke, produced by Kate Hodges and Simon Nasht and partnered with ABC TV, Screen Australia and Screen NSW.

The film attracted criticism from environmentalists and scientists who stated that climate change is not scientifically controversial, and that the format of the show was read "directly from the denialist strategic playbook." Graham Redfearn said of the program: "If I were a climate sceptic activist or a fossil fuel lobbyist designing a format for a TV show, this show is what I’d probably come up with." Simon Nasht defended the choice of format by saying "We set out to see who Nick relies on and who Anna relies on. That’s a valid approach.”

==== Defendant 5 (2014) ====
Documentary filmmaker Heidi Douglas went to Tasmania to investigate the old-growth forest logging industry by Gunns Ltd. After discovering that locals were up in arms about the woodchipping of the island's ancient forests, Douglas was shocked when she and 19 other critics were sued by Gunns in a $6.4 million lawsuit. Douglas’ ten-year journey, a battle between a corporation and community activists was condensed down to a half-hour documentary film. It was directed by Heidi Douglas and produced by Ruth Cross. Executive Producers were Trish Lake and Simon Nasht. The production partnered with ABC TV, Al Jazeera English, Screen Tasmania, Screen Australia and Metro Screen.

==== Frackman (2015) ====
Frackman is a feature-length documentary film which follows anti-coal seam gas activist Dayne Pratzky through his personal investigation of the industry's impact on rural Australian communities. The film was directed by Richard Todd, co-directed by Jonathan Stack, produced by Richard Todd, Simon Nasht and Trish Lake and was co-produced by Kate Hodges and Daniel Lake. The film premiered in March 2015 and commenced a touring program of cinema screenings in regional Australian towns.

The coal seam gas industry criticised the film, and public funds being used to produce documentaries of its kind.

=== Energy ===
==== Ten Bucks a Litre (2013) ====
Ten Bucks a Litre is a one-hour documentary film that investigates the options available for addressing Australia's energy export and domestic production future. The film starred and was narrated by Dick Smith, and was colloquially described as a "dick-umentary" by producer, Simon Nasht. On receipt of government funding via Screen Australia, the film's synopsis described Dick's intention "to separate the facts from the hot air" as he asked "What are Australia’s options as we enter the age of energy disruption?" The film was directed by Max Bourke and produced by Simon Nasht and Kate Hodges. The film premiered on ABC on 1 August 2013.

The film discusses topics like energy efficiency, the affordability of solar panels and battery storage, coal seam gas extraction and the potential for nuclear power in Australia. While Dick Smith and Ziggy Switkowski (profiled in the film) have advocated for nuclear power, strong opposition exists in Australia.

=== Natural history ===
==== Life On Us (2014) ====
Life On Us investigates the microscopic world of organisms which live on and inside human bodies. It featured innovative moving image electron microscopy and super-macro filming techniques. The work took the shape of a two part series, each a two-hour episode. It was written and directed by Annamaria Talas and produced by Simon Nasht. It premiered in April 2014 on Australian broadcaster, SBS. The production partnered with co-producers Mona Lisa Production (France), SBS, ARTE France and Screen Australia.

The Kingdom: How Fungi made The World (2018)

A co-production with Canada's Real to Reel Productions, this multi-award winning film was directed by Annamaria Talas and produced by Nasht and Susan MacKinnon. As of late 2019, it had won more than 15 international prizes, including the Paris Science Grand Prix, Jackson Hole Science Media Award, Best Film at Scinema 2019 and the Horst Stern Award for Best Nature Film in Germany. The film tells the story of fungi's importance in driving life's evolution on land and was initially broadcast on Curiosity Stream, ARTE, SVT and National Geographic Australia.

Quoll Farm (2020)

Hidden in a secret valley on an island at the bottom of the world is Quoll Farm. It's a wondrous place full of unique animals, including the endangered Eastern Quoll marsupial. Wildlife specialist Simon Plowright will spend a year of his life on this abandoned property, observing and filming this special place. This is a co-production with Wild Creature Films in Tasmania for ABC, NHK, Smithsonian Networks, and ZDF/ARTE.

=== Overpopulation ===
==== Dick Smith's Population Puzzle (2010) ====
Dick Smith's Population Puzzle (2010) was Smith's first collaboration with Nasht, though it was not released as an official Smith&Nasht production. It attracted media attention due to the public and private sector contributions to its financing, which included public funding via the ABC and a personal contribution of Dick Smith's time and approximately $50,000 in cash. Following the film's premiere on ABC television, the discussion show Q&A picked up the program's topic. This programming format and partnership with Q&A set a precedent that later Smith & Nasht productions would follow.

==== The Vasectomist (2013) ====
The Vasectomist is a one-hour documentary which follows Dr Doug Stein, a urologist who travels the world conducting vasectomies. He is motivated by his concerns for over-population, climate change and the carrying capacity of the earth and the film is intended to prompt conversations around these themes. The film was directed by Jonathan Stack and produced by Ruth Cross. Simon Nasht and Dick Smith were the executive producers. Film production partners included SBS, CBC, DR, VPRO, Screen Australia and Screen NSW, and the film premiered at the Adelaide Film Festival in 2013. Dick Smith has long been concerned with the issue of overpopulation, as evidenced in his first film, Dick Smith's Population Puzzle. The film led to the establishment of the international NGO, World Vasectomy Day which each year hosts a global live event to encourage male participation in family planning.

==== The People Paradox (2013) ====
The People Paradox is a 90-minute documentary film that follows the life and work of Professor Paul Ehrlich as he warns the world of the dangers of human overpopulation. The film was directed by Simon Nasht and Jonathan Stack, and produced by Nasht, Stack and Ruth Cross.

Joyride (2017)

For some, creating an effective, affordable female condom that people want to use is an obsession. For millions, accessing such a device is a matter of life and death for the unwanted pregnancies and sexually transmitted infections it would prevent. Frank Sadlo, from the US, has developed Luvli. Dr John Tang has developed Wondaleaf from Malaysia. It has been a challenging and expensive exercise for both of them – and all who have gone before. A humorous film about a very serious subject, directed by Randall Wood

=== Miscellaneous ===
==== Canberra Confidential (2013) ====
Presented by Annabel Crabb, Canberra Confidential is a one-hour documentary film which explores forgotten secrets and scandals from Australia's capital city. The film was directed by Ian Walker and produced by Kate Hodges, Anna Cater and Simon Nasht. It was produced in partnership with ABC TV, Screen Australia and Screen ACT.

=== I Can Change Your Mind About Recognition -(2015) ===
As Australia heads to a referendum on Indigenous recognition, two strongly opposed advocates, conservative media columnist Andrew Bolt and Indigenous politician Linda Burney, travel the nation to see if they can change each other's mind. The film was produced as a 1-hour documentary film for broadcast on ABC. The film received production investment from Screen Australia, announced in November 2014 and an additional $51,000 from Screen NSW in production finance. The project had also been listed under the working title I Can Change Your Mind About Racism.

=== Inside the Inferno – The Science of Bushfires 2 x 1 hour (2016) ===
To live in Australia is to experience bushfire. As our population grows and as the effects of climate change are felt, will Australia experience its worst bushfire season yet? Inside the Inferno - The Science of Bushfires is a two part series directed by Max Bourke and produced by Marcus Gillezeau, Ellenor Cox as a co-production with Dragon Fly UK for SBS and BBC. . Program sales managed by Shine International.

== Films in development ==
The Science of Success (2020)

A one hour film that reveals how new science is showing that talent and hard work are not enough to ensure success. Written and directed by Annamaria Talas.

The Children In The Pictures (2020)

We go deep inside the law enforcement agencies battling the most ghastly of all crimes: online child sexual abuse. Developed with the support of Screen Australia and Film Victoria in association with DNX Media. As well as a feature-length documentary, a 10-part podcast series is in production with Audible Australia for release in 2020
