= Drew Hutton =

Australian politician (born 1947)

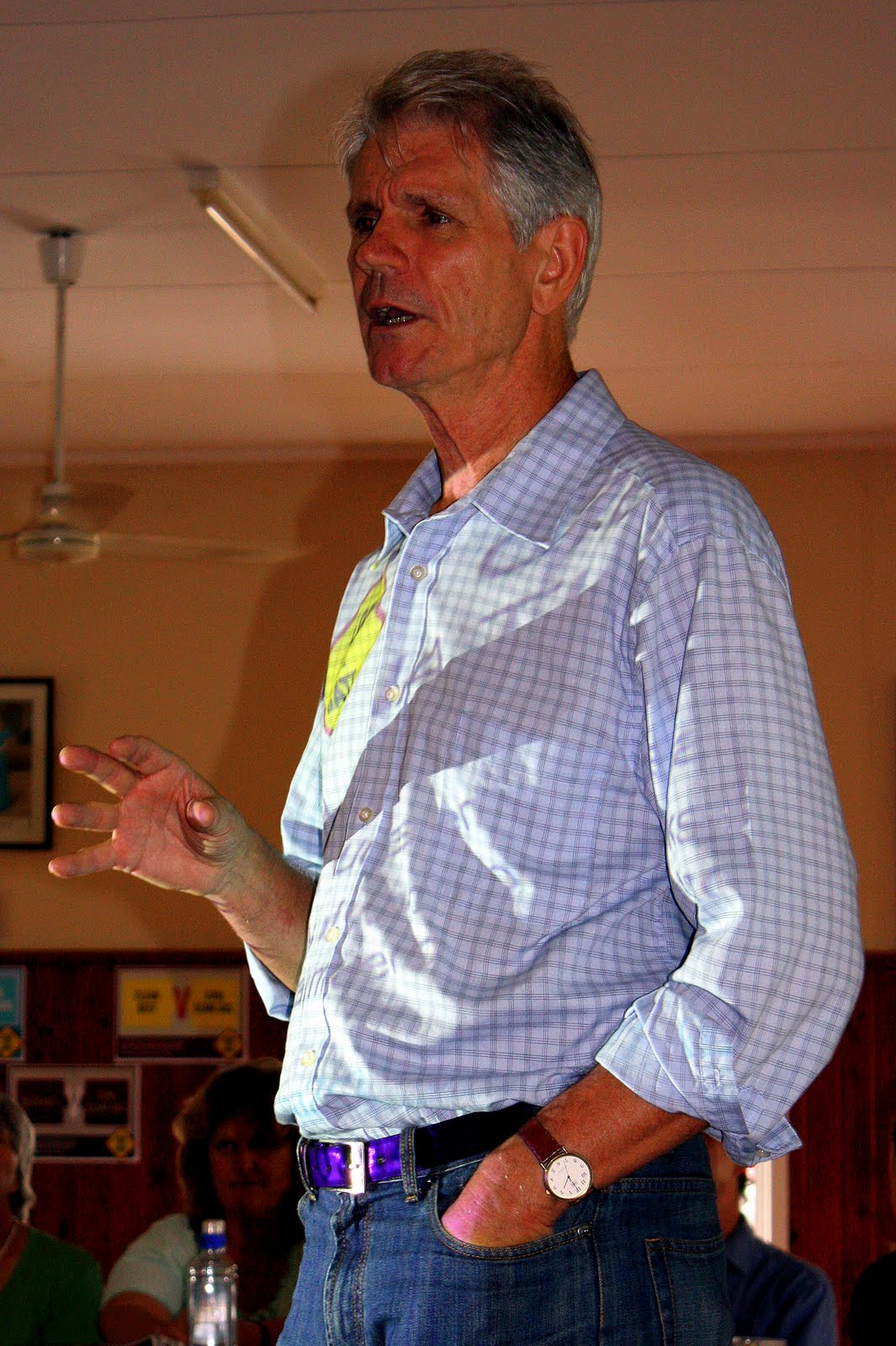
- Lock the Gate Forum, February 2011
- Born: Peter Drew Hutton; 1947 (age 78–79)
- Occupations: Schoolteacher, college lecturer, author
- Political party: Australian Greens (federal; 1991–2025); Queensland Greens (state; 1990–2025)
- Spouse: Libby Connors
- Children: 2

Peter Drew Hutton (born 1947) is an Australian activist, academic, campaigner and past political candidate. Hutton co-founded the Queensland Greens (in 1990) and Australian Greens (in 1991) and ran in elections in Queensland and Australia at all three levels of government.

== Social activist ==
Hutton has been a social activist all his adult life. "Since 1984 I have been part of the process that has moved green politics from the margins to the mainstream of Australian political life. Along the way I have been privileged to represent the Party as a spokesperson and as a candidate. The Greens are now poised to enter that mainstream as a powerful force, representing the hopes and aspirations of many, many Australians."

== Educator ==
He worked as a high school teacher and then a college lecturer from the 1960s to the 1980s. In the 1970s he joined the anti-Vietnam War campaign and civil liberties campaigns and in the 1980s he was active in the peace movement. Hutton became involved in campaigns on uranium mining, Indigenous land rights and nuclear disarmament. He also used his position as a teacher educator to champion peace and environmental education in schools and more democratic school environments and teaching practices.

For many years, Hutton was a lecturer at tertiary institutions in South East Queensland including Queensland University of Technology (QUT) and University of Southern Queensland. Hutton has published books and numerous articles, especially on green philosophy, history and ethics. He brought together the first book on green politics in Australia in 1987 and with his partner Libby Connors wrote A History of the Australian Environment Movement published by Cambridge University Press in 1999. Hutton and Connors married in 1986, and have two adult sons.

== Organiser ==
Over the last 29 years Hutton has been a key organiser or spokesperson for campaigns against freeways, the storage and transport of hazardous waste, against evictions of poorer residents in inner-city Brisbane suburbs, nuclear disarmament, public transport and marijuana legalisation. He fought against the Bjelke-Petersen government and ended up in court on many occasions as a result.

Hutton's work against pollution resulted in a 1994 Criminal Justice Commission inquiry into toxic waste dumping in Queensland, an inquiry which highlighted massive problems and led to pressure on the Wayne Goss Government to introduce the Environmental Protection Act. He has been active on many environmental campaigns such as land clearing and was involved in the campaign against the war in Iraq. Hutton's highest vote as a candidate was 25.64% in the ward of The Gabba in the 2008 Brisbane City Council elections.

=== Electoral History ===
Brisbane City Council
Election year	Electorate	Party	Votes	FP%	+/-	2PP%	+/-	Result
1985	Lord Mayor	GRN	14,805	3.80	▲3.80	N/A	N/A	Third
2004	Lord Mayor	GRN	52,995	10.13	▲10.13	N/A	N/A	Third
2008	The Gabba Ward	GRN	5,021	25.64	▼0.12	N/A	N/A	Third

Australian Senate
Election year	Electorate	Party	Votes	FP%	+/-	Quota	+/-	Result
1993	Queensland	GRN	59,303	3.20	▲3.20	0.22	▲0.22	Eliminated
1998	Queensland	GRN	42,264	2.10	▼0.30	0.15	▼0.02	Eliminated
2004	Queensland	GRN	122,393	5.40	▲2.09	0.51	▲0.28	Eliminated

Queensland Legislative Assembly
Election year	Electorate	Party	Votes	FP%	+/-	2PP%	+/-	Result
1998	Indooroopilly	GRN	2,049	9.70	▲0.80	N/A	N/A	Third
2001	Indooroopilly	GRN	2,351	10.10	▲0.40	N/A	N/A	Third

== Lock the Gate Alliance ==
In June 2011, Hutton was elected president of the Lock the Gate Alliance, an organisation he helped establish the previous year. On 9 December 2011 Hutton was found guilty in the Dalby Magistrates Court of 'obstructing a coal seam gas company without reasonable excuse' under s804 of the Petroleum and Gas Act.

He was protesting against the Queensland Gas Company entering a property in Queensland's Darling Downs when he was arrested in March of that year. Hutton has seen the Lock the Gate Alliance member base grow to represent over 30,000 individuals and 280 communities nationwide, and has become a regular spokesperson on the impacts of invasive mining activities on agricultural land, water resources, regional communities and ecologically sensitive areas.

== Removal from the Greens ==
Hutton's membership of the Greens was suspended for 2 years before being terminated in July 2025 after making comments on social media about "trans extremists" that were deemed transphobic by the Queensland Greens' Constitution and Arbitration Committee, as well as speaking at two rallies organised by Woman Up Queensland, a group criticised as being a trans-exclusionary radical feminist (TERF) organisation.

In November 2025, Hutton's membership was reinstated after the Greens accepted legal advice that he had been denied natural justice during the disciplinary proceedings. In March 2026, Hutton announced that his legal dispute with the party had been settled. Party representatives stated that withdrawing the termination decision related to procedural issues rather than the substance of the original complaint.

In June 2026, Hutton resigned as a member of the Greens, posting on social media in support of trans-exclusionary radical feminist Sall Grover on the same day.

== See also ==
- Australian Greens
- 2004 Australian Greens candidates
