= List of awards and nominations received by Alejandro González Iñárritu =

Alejandro González Iñárritu awards
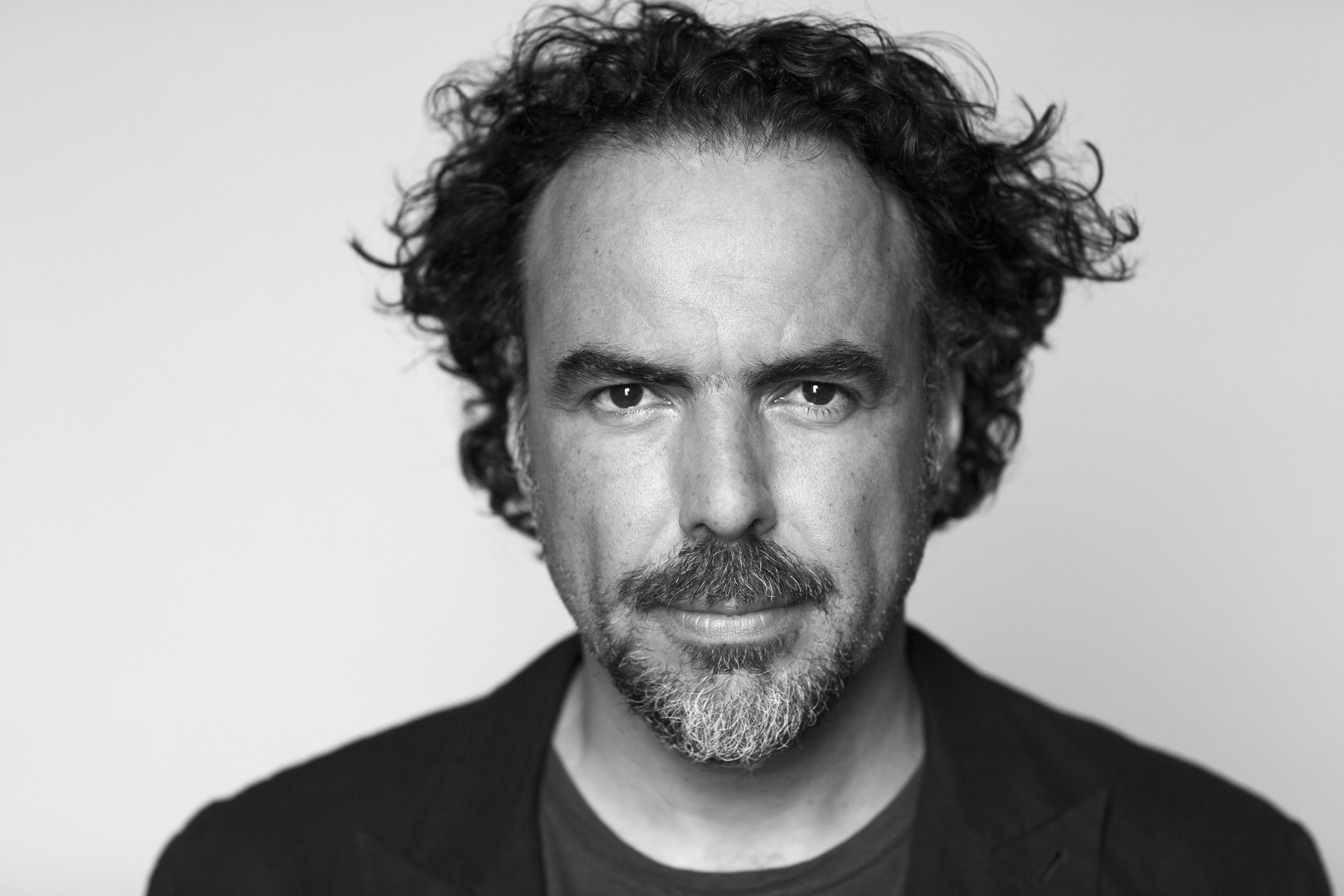
- Alejandro González Iñárritu in 2013
Award	Wins	Nominations
Academy Awards	4	7
BAFTA Awards	3	7
AACTA Awards	3	3
Ariel Awards	6	8
Golden Globes	4	7
DGA Awards	3	4
PGA Awards	1	3
Saturn Award	0	3
Independent Spirit Awards	2	4

The following is a list of awards and nominations received by Mexican film director, producer, and screenwriter Alejandro González Iñárritu. His filmography comprises feature films, short films, television and commercials. González Iñárritu has been recognized with multiple awards for his films, including four Academy Awards, three Directors Guild of America Awards, a Producers Guild of America Award, three BAFTA Awards, three AACTA Awards, three Golden Globe Award, two Independent Spirit Awards, two American Film Institute Awards, and three Cannes Film Festival awards.

González Iñárritu is the first Mexican director to be nominated for the Academy Award for Best Director and the Directors Guild of America Award for Outstanding Directing, and the first to win the Best Director Award at the Cannes Film Festival. His first six feature films – Amores perros (2000), 21 Grams (2003), Babel (2006), Biutiful (2010), Birdman or (The Unexpected Virtue of Ignorance) (2014), and The Revenant (2015) – received a total of 33 Academy Award nominations. Amores perros and Biutiful received Academy Award, Golden Globe and BAFTA Award nominations for Best Foreign Language Film, with Amores perros winning the BAFTA Award. In 2015, González Iñárritu won the Producers Guild of America Award for Best Theatrical Motion Picture, the Directors Guild Award for Outstanding Directing, and the Academy Award for Best Picture, Best Original Screenplay and Best Director for Birdman, becoming the first Mexican to win three Oscars. In 2016, he won the Academy Award for Best Director for The Revenant, marking the first time in 65 years that a director has won the award in two consecutive years. Iñárritu is the third director to accomplish this feat.

In 2006, González Iñárritu was honored at the Gotham Awards' World Cinema Tribute, alongside fellow Mexican filmmakers Alfonso Cuarón and Guillermo del Toro. In June 2015, González Iñárritu received the Sundance Institute's Vanguard Leadership Award for the "originality and independent spirit" of his films. In November 2015, he was honored by the Los Angeles County Museum of Art at its Art + Film Gala.

== Major associations ==
=== Academy Awards ===
Academy Awards
Year	Category	Nominated work	Result	Ref.
2007	Best Picture	Babel	Nominated	
2007	Best Director	Babel	Nominated	
2015	Best Picture	Birdman or (The Unexpected Virtue of Ignorance)	Won	
2015	Best Director	Birdman or (The Unexpected Virtue of Ignorance)	Won	
2015	Best Original Screenplay	Birdman or (The Unexpected Virtue of Ignorance)	Won	
2016	Best Picture	The Revenant	Nominated	
2016	Best Director	The Revenant	Won	
2018	Special Achievement Academy Award	Flesh and Sand	Recipient	

=== British Academy Film Awards ===
British Academy Film Awards
Year	Category	Nominated work	Result	Ref.
2007	Best Film	Babel	Nominated	
2007	Best Direction	Babel	Nominated	
2015	Best Film	Birdman or (The Unexpected Virtue of Ignorance)	Nominated	
2015	Best Direction	Birdman or (The Unexpected Virtue of Ignorance)	Nominated	
2015	Best Original Screenplay	Birdman or (The Unexpected Virtue of Ignorance)	Nominated	
2016	Best Film	The Revenant	Won	
2016	Best Direction	The Revenant	Won	

=== Golden Globe Awards ===
Golden Globe Awards
Year	Category	Nominated work	Result	Ref.
2007	Best Motion Picture – Drama	Babel	Won	
2007	Best Director	Babel	Nominated	
2015	Best Motion Picture – Musical or Comedy	Birdman or (The Unexpected Virtue of Ignorance)	Nominated	
2015	Best Director	Birdman or (The Unexpected Virtue of Ignorance)	Nominated	
2015	Best Screenplay	Birdman or (The Unexpected Virtue of Ignorance)	Won	
2016	Best Motion Picture – Drama	The Revenant	Won	
2016	Best Director	The Revenant	Won	

== Industry awards ==
=== AACTA Awards ===
AACTA International Awards
Year	Nominated work	Category	Result	Ref.
2015	Birdman or (The Unexpected Virtue of Ignorance)	Best Film	Won	
2015	Birdman or (The Unexpected Virtue of Ignorance)	Best Direction	Won	
2015	Birdman or (The Unexpected Virtue of Ignorance)	Best Screenplay	Won	

=== American Film Institute ===
American Film Institute
Year	Nominated work	Category	Result	Ref.
2000	Amores perros	Audience Award – Best Feature Film	Won	
2015	Birdman or (The Unexpected Virtue of Ignorance)	Movie of the Year	Won	

=== Ariel Awards ===
Ariel Awards
Year	Nominated Work	Category	Result	Ref.
2001	Amores perros	Best Picture	Won	
2001	Amores perros	Best Director	Won	
2001	Amores perros	Best First Work	Won	
2001	Amores perros	Best Editing	Won	
2023	Bardo, False Chronicle of a Handful of Truths	Best Picture	Nominated	
2023	Bardo, False Chronicle of a Handful of Truths	Best Director	Won	
2023	Bardo, False Chronicle of a Handful of Truths	Best Original Score	Nominated	Composed with Bryce Dessner
2023	Bardo, False Chronicle of a Handful of Truths	Best Editing	Won	

=== Directors Guild of America Awards ===
Directors Guild of America Award
Year	Nominated work	Category	Result	Ref.
2007	Babel	Outstanding Directing – Feature Film	Nominated	
2013	Best Job	Outstanding Directorial Achievement in Commercials	Won	
2015	Birdman or (The Unexpected Virtue of Ignorance)	Outstanding Directing – Feature Film	Won	
2016	The Revenant	Outstanding Directing – Feature Film	Won	

=== Independent Spirit Awards ===
Independent Spirit Awards
Year	Nominated work	Category	Result	Ref.
2002	Amores perros	Best Foreign Film	Nominated	
2004	21 Grams	Special Distinction Award	Won	
2015	Birdman or (The Unexpected Virtue of Ignorance)	Best Film	Won	
2015	Birdman or (The Unexpected Virtue of Ignorance)	Best Director	Nominated	

=== National Board of Review ===
National Board of Review
Year	Nominated work	Category	Result	Ref.
2002	Amores perros	Best Foreign Language Film	Won	
2002	Amores perros	Top Foreign Films	Won	
2003	21 Grams	Top 10 Films	Won	
2007	Babel	Top 10 Films	Won	
2014	Birdman or (The Unexpected Virtue of Ignorance)	Top 10 Films	Won	

=== Producers Guild of America Awards ===
Producers Guild of America Award
Year	Nominated work	Category	Result	Ref.
2007	Babel	Outstanding Theatrical Motion Picture	Nominated	
2015	Birdman or (The Unexpected Virtue of Ignorance)	Outstanding Theatrical Motion Picture	Won	
2016	The Revenant	Outstanding Theatrical Motion Picture	Nominated	

=== Satellite Awards ===
Satellite Awards
Year	Nominated work	Category	Result	Ref.
2015	Birdman or (The Unexpected Virtue of Ignorance)	Best Film	Won	
2015	Birdman or (The Unexpected Virtue of Ignorance)	Best Director	Nominated	
2015	Birdman or (The Unexpected Virtue of Ignorance)	Best Original Screenplay	Nominated	
2016	The Revenant	Best Film	Nominated	
2016	The Revenant	Best Director	Nominated	
2016	The Revenant	Best Adapted Screenplay	Nominated	

=== Saturn Award ===
Saturn Award
Year	Nominated work	Category	Result	Ref.
2015	Birdman or (The Unexpected Virtue of Ignorance)	Best Fantasy Film	Nominated	
2015	Birdman or (The Unexpected Virtue of Ignorance)	Best Director	Nominated	
2016	The Revenant	Best Action or Adventure Film	Nominated	

== Film festival awards ==
=== Cannes Film Festival ===
Cannes Film Festival
Year	Nominated work	Category	Result	Ref.
2000	Amores perros	Critics Week Grand Prize	Won	
2006	Babel	Palme d'Or	Nominated	
2006	Babel	Prize of the Ecumenical Jury	Won	
2006	Babel	Best Director	Won	
2010	Biutiful	Palme d'Or	Nominated	

=== Capri Hollywood International Film Festival ===
Capri Hollywood International Film Festival
Year	Nominated work	Category	Result	Ref.
2014	Birdman or (The Unexpected Virtue of Ignorance)	Capri Visionary Award	Won	
2022	Bardo, False Chronicle of a Handful of Truths	Capri Visionary Award	Won	

=== Palm Springs International Film Festival ===
Palm Springs International Film Festival
Year	Nominated work	Category	Result	Ref.
2000	Amores perros	FIPRESCI Award for Best Foreign Language Film	Won	
2006	Babel	Director of the Year	Won	
2015	Birdman or (The Unexpected Virtue of Ignorance)	Director of the Year	Won	

=== Venice Film Festival ===
Venice Film Festival
Year	Nominated work	Category	Result	Ref.
2002	11'09"01 September 11	UNESCO Award	Won	
2003	21 Grams	Golden Lion	Nominated	
2014	Birdman or (The Unexpected Virtue of Ignorance)	Golden Lion	Nominated	
2022	Bardo, False Chronicle of a Handful of Truths	Golden Lion	Nominated	

== Critics awards ==
=== Critics' Choice Movie Awards ===
Critics' Choice Movie Awards (Broadcast Film Critics Association Award)
Year	Nominated work	Category	Result	Ref.
2011	Biutiful	Best Foreign Language Film	Nominated	
2015	Birdman or (The Unexpected Virtue of Ignorance)	Best Director	Nominated	
2015	Birdman or (The Unexpected Virtue of Ignorance)	Best Original Screenplay	Won	
2016	The Revenant	Best Director	Nominated	
2022	Bardo, False Chronicle of a Handful of Truths	Best Foreign Language Film	Nominated	

=== Los Angeles Film Critics Association ===
Los Angeles Film Critics Association
Year	Nominated work	Category	Result	Ref.
2014	Birdman or (The Unexpected Virtue of Ignorance)	Best Screenplay	Runner-up	

== See also ==
- Cha Cha Cha Films
