= Alejandro González Iñárritu filmography =

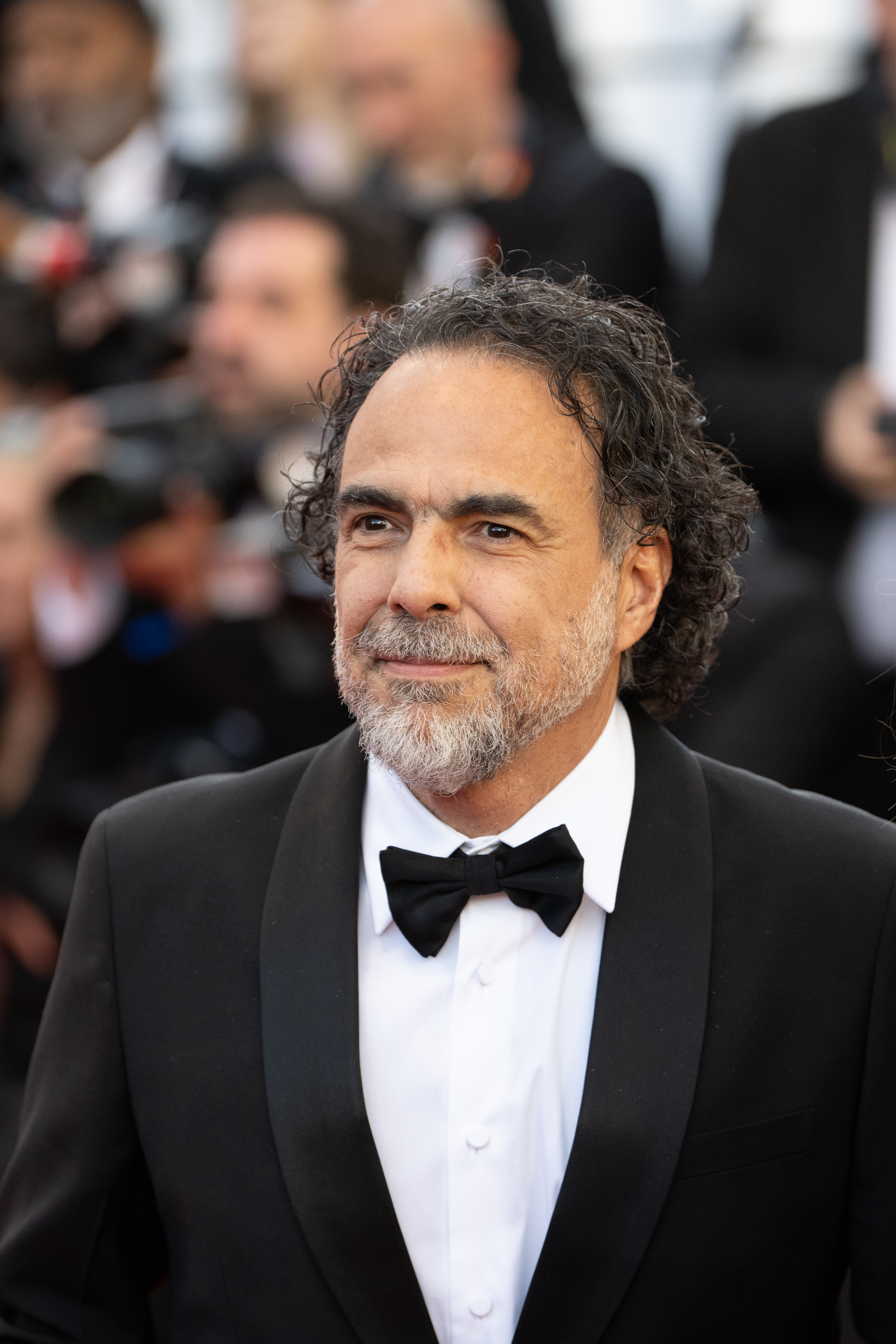
- Iñárritu at the 78th annual Cannes Film Festival
- Film: 8
- Television film: 1
- Television show: 1
- Advertising: 3

Alejandro González Iñárritu is a Mexican film director, screenwriter, and film producer. His feature directorial debut was the psychological drama Amores perros (2000) from a script by Guillermo Arriaga, which premiered at the Cannes Film Festival and won the Critics' Week Grand Prize; it marked the first of Iñárritu's and Arriaga's thematic "Death trilogy." In 2002, Iñárritu took on commercial short films with "Powder Keg", an entry in BMW’s acclaimed The Hire series. The short, which starred Clive Owen alongside Stellan Skarsgård, earned him a Cannes Gold Lion Advertising Award. Following the success of Amores Perros, Iñárritu reunited with Arriaga for his 2003 follow-up, 21 Grams, once again utilizing a non-linear, intersecting storyline. Starring Sean Penn, Naomi Watts, and Benicio del Toro, the film competed for the Golden Lion at the Venice Film Festival, where Penn earned the Volpi Cup for Best Actor, and later netted Academy Award nominations for both Watts and Del Toro.

In 2001, Iñárritu contributed an 11-minute segment to the anthology film 11'09"01 September 11, which featured short films from international directors responding to the September 11 attacks. He directed the short film Anna for the 2007 anthology Chacun son cinéma, a project commissioned for the 60th anniversary of the Cannes Film Festival. In 2012, Iñárritu directed Naran Ja: One Act Orange Dance, an experimental short featuring dancer Julia Eichten and choreography by Benjamin Millepied for the L.A. Dance Project. In 2006, Iñárritu directed Babel, the final installment in his "Death Trilogy" written by Guillermo Arriaga, for which Iñárritu won the Best Director Award at the 2006 Cannes Film Festival, becoming the first Mexican director to receive the honor. Babel received seven Academy Award nominations, including Best Picture and Best Director, and won the Golden Globe for Best Motion Picture Drama, while composer Gustavo Santaolalla won the Academy Award for Best Original Score. Following the film's completion, Iñárritu and Arriaga ended their working relationship.

Following his success with Babel, Iñárritu directed the Spanish-language drama Biutiful (2010), which received Academy Award nominations for Best Foreign Language Film and Best Actor for Javier Bardem. He followed this with the dark comedy Birdman (2014) and the historical survival drama The Revenant (2015). The projects earned him consecutive Academy Awards for Best Director, making him one of three directors in history to accomplish the feat; Birdman also won Best Picture and Best Original Screenplay, while The Revenant received twelve nominations and three wins, including Best Actor for Leonardo DiCaprio. His subsequent work includes the virtual reality installation Carne y Arena (2017), the Spanish-language feature Bardo, False Chronicle of a Handful of Truths (2022), and the English-language film Digger (2026), starring Tom Cruise.

== Film ==
Year	Title	Director	Writer	Producer	Editor	Notes	Ref.
2000	Amores perros	Yes	No	Yes	Yes		
2003	21 Grams	Yes	No	Yes	No		
2006	Babel	Yes	Story	Yes	No		
2010	Biutiful	Yes	Yes	Yes	No		
2014	Birdman	Yes	Yes	Yes	No		
2015	The Revenant	Yes	Yes	Yes	No		
2022	Bardo	Yes	Yes	Yes	Yes	Also composer	
2026	Digger	Yes	Yes	Yes	No		

=== Short films ===
Year	Title	Director	Producer	Writer	Editor	Notes
1996	El timbre	Yes	Yes	Yes	No	
2001	Powder Keg	Yes	Yes	Yes	Yes	From The Hire series for BMW
2002	"Mexico"	Yes	Yes	Yes	Yes	Also sound designer; Segment from the film 11'09"01 September 11
2007	"Anna"	Yes	Yes	No	No	Segment from the film To Each His Own Cinema
2012	Naran Ja	Yes	No	No	No	
2017	Flesh and Sand	Yes	Yes	Yes	No	

=== Writer or producer only ===
Year	Title	Writer	Producer
1995	Detrás del dinero	Yes	Yes
2005	Nine Lives	No	Executive
2005	Toro negro	No	Executive
2008	Rudo y Cursi	No	Yes
2009	Mother and Child	No	Executive
2012	The Last Elvis	No	Associate
2014	The Land of Silence	No	Executive
2017	Los Ojos del Mar	No	Executive
2021	Shake Your Cares Away	No	Executive

== Commercials ==
Year	Title	Brand	Ref.
2010	Write the Future	Nike	
2012	The Things That Connect Us	Facebook	
2018	Air Moves You	Nike	

== Unrealized projects ==
Year	Title and description	Ref.
2000s	There Be Dragons, written by Barbara Nicolosi, which Iñárritu turned down, leading to Roland Joffe directing the film	
2010s	Red Flag, a film adaptation of Jennifer Vogel's memoir Flim-Flam Man: A True Family History starring Sean Penn, which eventually became Penn's own Flag Day (2021)	
2010s	The Hunger Games: Catching Fire, which Iñárritu turned down, leading to Francis Lawrence directing the film	
2010s	True Detective season 1, which Iñárritu turned down, leading to Cary Joji Fukunaga directing the episodes	
2010s	A film adaptation of Rudyard Kipling's novel The Jungle Book, which eventually became Andy Serkis' Mowgli: Legend of the Jungle (2018)	
2010s	The One Percent, a Starz television series about an organic farming family played by Ed Harris, Hilary Swank, & Ed Helms, written by Iñárritu, Alexander Dinelaris Jr., Nicolas Giacobone, and Armando Bó, which Starz got a straight-to-series order, but dropped out in 2017 as the U.S. broadcaster of the series, with production company MRC shopping the project to other networks or streaming platforms.	
