= Biutiful =

2010 film by Alejandro González Iñárritu

- Theatrical release poster
- Directed by: Alejandro González Iñárritu
- Written by: Alejandro González Iñárritu; Armando Bó; Nicolás Giacobone
- Produced by: Alejandro González Iñárritu; Jon Kilik; Fernando Bovaira
- Starring: Javier Bardem
- Cinematography: Rodrigo Prieto
- Edited by: Stephen Mirrione
- Music by: Gustavo Santaolalla
- Production companies: Menage Atroz; MOD Producciones; Focus Features International; Televisión Española; Televisió de Catalunya; ICAA Ministerio de Cultura; Ikiru Films; Cha Cha Cha Films (uncredited)
- Distributed by: Videocine (Mexico); Universal Pictures (Spain)
- Release dates: 17 May 2010 (Cannes); 22 October 2010 (Mexico); 3 December 2010 (Spain)
- Running time: 147 minutes
- Countries: Mexico; Spain
- Languages: Spanish; Mandarin; Wolof
- Budget: $35 million
- Box office: $24.7 million

Biutiful is a 2010 psychological tragedy film directed, produced and co-written by Alejandro González Iñárritu, and starring Javier Bardem. The project marks Iñárritu's first film in his native Spanish language since his debut feature Amores perros (2000). Alfonso Cuarón and Guillermo del Toro (who make up the "Three Amigos" with Iñárritu in the film industry) serve as associate producers. The film follows Uxbal, a criminal and father who is diagnosed with prostate cancer and seeks to settle his affairs and responsibilities before he dies. The title is in reference to the phonetic spelling in Spanish of the English word beautiful.

Biutiful premiered at the 2010 Cannes Film Festival, and was released theatrically by Videocine in Mexico and United International Pictures in Spain on 22 October 2010 and 3 December, respectively. The film received mixed reviews from critics, and was a box-office bomb grossing $24.7 million worldwide on a budget of $35 million. It was nominated for two Academy Awards in 2011: Best Foreign Language and Best Actor for Bardem; his nomination was the first entirely Spanish-language performance to be nominated for the award. Bardem also received the Best Actor Award at Cannes for his work on the film.

== Plot ==
Uxbal lives in a shabby apartment in Barcelona with his two young children, Ana and Mateo. He is separated from their mother Marambra, an alcoholic masseuse with bipolar disorder. Having grown up an orphan, Uxbal has no family other than his brother Tito, who works in the construction business (and sometimes solicits Marambra's services). Uxbal earns a living by procuring work for a group of Chinese illegal immigrants who make forged designer goods which a group of African street vendors then sell. He also works as a medium to the dead, passing on messages from the recently deceased at wakes and funerals. When he is diagnosed with terminal prostate cancer, leaving him with only a few months to live, his world progressively falls apart.

Uxbal initially begins chemotherapy, but he later ends the treatment at the advice of his friend Bea, an alternative healer. She gives him two black stones which she asks him to give his children before he dies. The group of Africans are arrested by the police, despite Uxbal's regular payment of bribes, because they also deal in drugs. When one of them is deported back to Senegal, Uxbal offers his wife Ige and baby son a room in his apartment. Meanwhile, an attempt at reconciliation with Marambra fails when Uxbal realizes she cannot be trusted to look after their children. As the Chinese are out of work, Tito brokers a deal to get them employed at a construction site. However, almost all of them die in the night from carbon monoxide poisoning, as the cheap gas heaters Uxbal bought in an effort to help were not safe. An attempt by a human trafficker to dump the bodies into the sea fails when they are washed up on the shore shortly after, causing a media sensation.

As Uxbal's health continues to deteriorate, he is plagued with guilt that he is responsible for the expulsion of the Senegalese and the death of the Chinese. With his death drawing nearer, he realizes that there will be nobody to take care of Ana and Mateo once he is gone. He entrusts the remainder of his savings to Ige, asking her to stay with the children after his death. She accepts his request but later decides to use the money to return to Africa. At the apartment, Uxbal sees Ige's silhouette behind the bathroom door and hears her voice saying she has returned. Uxbal lies down next to Ana and, after having passed on to her a diamond ring which his father had once given to his mother, he dies. In a snowy winter landscape, he is reunited with his father, who had died before Uxbal's birth and shortly after having fled Francoist Spain for Mexico.

== Cast ==
- Javier Bardem as Uxbal
- Maricel Álvarez as Marambra
- Eduard Fernández as Tito
- Guillermo Estrella as Mateo
- Hanaa Bouchaib as Ana
- Cheikh Ndiaye as Ekweme
- Diaryatou Daff as Igé
- Cheng Tai Shen as Hai
- Luo Jin as Liwei
- George Chibukwen Chukwuma as Samuel
- Rubén Ochandiano as Zanc
- Karra Elejalde as Mendoza

== Production ==
Iñárritu got the idea for the film while listening to Ravel's Piano Concerto, and its slow middle movement features prominently in the film soundtrack.

Biutiful is formally recognised as a Mexico-Spanish co-production, even if US independent production companies also took part in the production. It is a Menage Atroz, MOD Producciones, Focus Features International, Ikiru Films, and Cha Cha Cha Films (although it later went uncredited) production, and it also had the participation of Televisión Española, Televisió de Catalunya, and ICAA Ministerio de Cultura. Director/producer/co-writer Alejandro González Iñárritu reunites with composer Gustavo Santaolalla and cinematographer Rodrigo Prieto from his previous films, Amores perros (2001), 21 Grams (2003), and Babel (2006), and editor Stephen Mirrione from the latter two films. Alfonso Cuarón and Guillermo del Toro, friends and part of the film industry's dubbed "The Three Amigos of Cinema" with González Iñárritu, serve as associate producers.

The film's model, Akira Kurosawa's 1953 Japanese film Ikiru, is described as a similar structure and morale in The Guardian's article by Philip French. French writes: "the way a middle-aged Japanese civil servant reacts to the news that he has terminal cancer – and transformed it into a profound statement about the human condition".

== Release ==
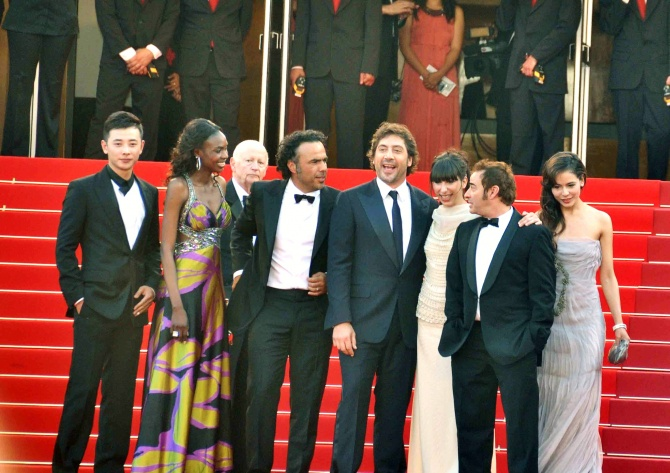
Cast and crew at the 2010 Cannes Film Festival.

Biutiful competed for the Palme d'Or at the 2010 Cannes Film Festival; it premiered on 17 May 2010, with Bardem winning for Best Actor, an award shared with Elio Germano for La Nostra Vita. The film released theatrically in Mexico by Videocine on 22 October that same year, and in Spain by United International Pictures on 3 December.

In the United States, the film was released by LD Entertainment and Roadside Attractions on 29 December 2010 in select theaters before a wide release on 28 January 2011, and released on home media by Lionsgate Home Entertainment on 31 May 2011.

== Reception ==
=== Box office ===
Biutiful grossed $5.1 million in North America and $19.6 million overseas for a worldwide total of $24.7 million, against a production budget of $35 million.

=== Critical reception ===
Review aggregator website Rotten Tomatoes reports an approval rating of 66% based on 151 reviews, with an average rating of 6.5/10. The site's critical consensus reads, "Javier Bardem's searing performance helps to elevate Biutiful, as does Alejandro González Iñárritu's craftsmanship, but the film often lapses into contrivance and grimness." On Metacritic the film has a weighted average score of 58 out of 100, based on 33 critics, indicating "mixed or average reviews".

Kirk Honeycutt of The Hollywood Reporter calls the film, "a gorgeous melancholy tone poem about love, fatherhood and guilt", and describes Bardem's performance as "...a knockout." Betsy Sharkey of the Los Angeles Times wrote, "Bardem gives a performance of staggering depth, unquestionably one of the year’s best."

Some dismissed the story as too bleak; Justin Chang of Variety wrote Iñárritu is "...stuck in a grim rut."

Filmmakers Sean Penn, Werner Herzog and Michael Mann have been very outspoken in their acclaim for the film. Herzog likened it to a "poem" and Penn compared Bardem's performance to that of Marlon Brando in Last Tango in Paris (1972).

=== Awards ===
Award	Date of ceremony	Category	Recipient(s)	Result
Academy Awards	27 February 2011	Best Actor	Javier Bardem	Nominated
Academy Awards	27 February 2011	Best Foreign Language Film	Mexico	Nominated
British Academy Film Awards	13 February 2011	Best Leading Actor	Javier Bardem	Nominated
British Academy Film Awards	13 February 2011	Best Foreign Language Film		Nominated
Goya Awards	13 February 2011	Best Actor	Javier Bardem	Won
Goya Awards	13 February 2011	Best Supporting Actor	Eduard Fernández	Nominated
Goya Awards	13 February 2011	Best Supporting Actress	Ana Wagener	Nominated
Goya Awards	13 February 2011	Best Original Screenplay	Alejandro González Iñárritu, Armando Bó Jr., and Nicolás Giacobone	Nominated
Goya Awards	13 February 2011	Best Cinematography	Rodrigo Prieto	Nominated
Goya Awards	13 February 2011	Best Editing	Stephen Mirrione	Nominated
Goya Awards	13 February 2011	Best Art Direction	Brigitte Broch	Nominated
Goya Awards	13 February 2011	Best Original Score	Gustavo Santaolalla	Nominated
Denver Film Critics Society	28 January 2011	Best Foreign Language Film		Nominated
Golden Globe Awards	16 January 2011	Best Foreign Language Film		Nominated
Phoenix Film Critics Society Awards	28 December 2010	Best Foreign Language Film		Won
Utah Film Critics Association Awards	23 December 2010	Best Foreign Language Film		Nominated
Chicago Film Critics Association Awards	20 December 2010	Best Foreign Language Film		Nominated
St. Louis Gateway Film Critics Association Awards	20 December 2010	Best Actor	Javier Bardem	Nominated
St. Louis Gateway Film Critics Association Awards	20 December 2010	Best Foreign Language Film		Nominated
St. Louis Gateway Film Critics Association Awards	20 December 2010	Best Original Screenplay	Alejandro González Iñárritu, Armando Bó Jr., and Nicolás Giacobone	Nominated
Satellite Awards	19 December 2010	Best Actor	Javier Bardem	Nominated
Satellite Awards	19 December 2010	Best Foreign Language Film		Nominated
Satellite Awards	19 December 2010	Best Original Screenplay	Alejandro González Iñárritu, Armando Bó Jr., and Nicolás Giacobone	Nominated
Houston Film Critics Society Awards	18 December 2010	Best Foreign Language Film		Nominated
Dallas–Fort Worth Film Critics Association Awards	17 December 2010	Best Foreign Language Film		Won
Las Vegas Film Critics Society Awards	16 December 2010	Best Foreign Language Film		Nominated
San Diego Film Critics Society Awards	14 December 2010	Best Foreign Language Film		Nominated
Critics' Choice Award	14 December 2010	Best Foreign Language Film		Nominated
Southeastern Film Critics Association Awards	13 December 2010	Best Foreign Language Film		Nominated
Indiana Film Critics Association	12 December 2010	Best Foreign Language Film		Nominated
Washington D. C. Area Film Critics Association Awards	6 December 2010	Best Foreign Language Film		Won
Cannes Film Festival	23 May 2010	Best Actor	Javier Bardem	Won
Cannes Film Festival	23 May 2010	Palme d'Or		Nominated

== See also ==
- Alejandro González Iñárritu filmography
- List of submissions to the 83rd Academy Awards for Best Foreign Language Film
- List of Mexican submissions for the Academy Award for Best Foreign Language Film
- List of Mexican films of 2010
- List of Spanish films of 2010
