= Florida Film Critics Circle Awards 2003 =

Annual US film awards ceremony

8th FFCC Awards

January 2, 2004

Best Film:
The Lord of the Rings:
The Return of the King

The 8th Florida Film Critics Circle Awards, honoring the best in film for 2003, were held on January 2, 2004.

== Winners ==
- Best Actor:
  - Sean Penn - 21 Grams and Mystic River
- Best Actress:
  - Naomi Watts - 21 Grams
- Best Animated Film:
  - Finding Nemo
- Best Cast:
  - A Mighty Wind
- Best Cinematography:
  - The Lord of the Rings: The Return of the King - Andrew Lesnie
- Best Director:
  - Peter Jackson - The Lord of the Rings: The Return of the King
- Best Documentary Film:
  - Capturing the Friedmans
- Best Film:
  - The Lord of the Rings: The Return of the King
- Best Foreign Language Film:
  - The Man on the Train (L'homme du train) • France/Germany/UK/Switzerland
- Best Screenplay:
  - Lost in Translation - Sofia Coppola
- Best Supporting Actor:
  - Tim Robbins - Mystic River
- Best Supporting Actress:
  - Patricia Clarkson - Pieces of April and The Station Agent
