= Adriana Barraza =

Mexican actress (born 1956)

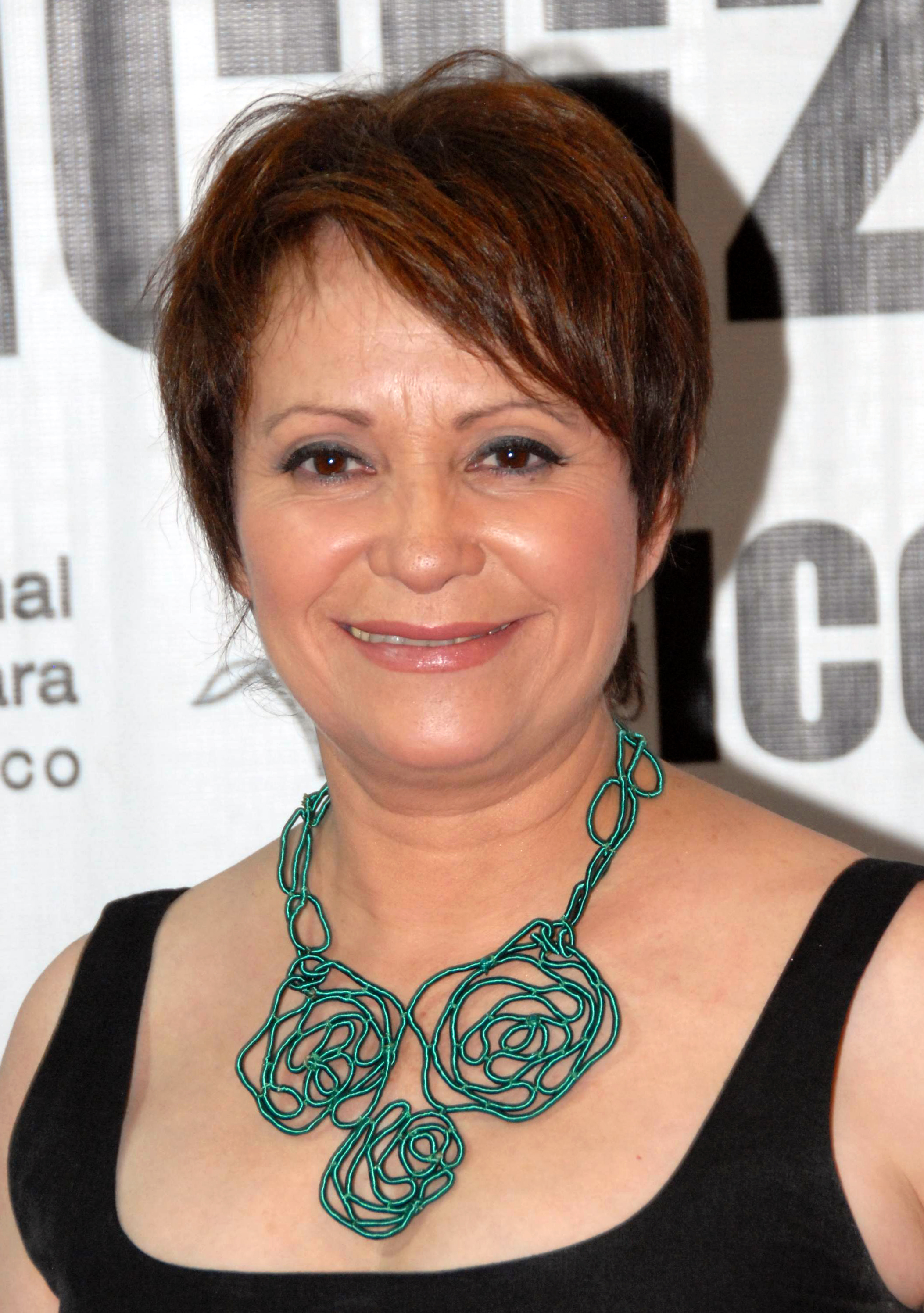
- Barraza in 2009
- Born: 5 March 1956 (age 70); Toluca, State of Mexico, Mexico
- Occupation: Actress
- Years active: 1985–present
- Spouses: Carlos Valsagna (m. 1978; div. 1985) Arnaldo Pipke (m. 2005)
- Children: 1

Adriana Barraza González (born 5 March 1956) is a Mexican actress. She was nominated for the Academy Award for Best Supporting Actress for Babel (2006).

== Early life ==
Barraza was born in Toluca, Estado de Mexico, the daughter of Celia González Flores and Eduardo Barraza Carral, a farmer. Her mother died when she was ten years old from myocarditis, a heart condition. Barraza herself has experienced two heart attacks. She has a sister named María Eugenia Barraza and three brothers, Eduardo, Porfirio and José.

== Career ==
In 1999 director Alejandro González Iñárritu cast her as the mother of Gael García Bernal's character in Amores perros, which was nominated for the Academy Award for Best Foreign Language Film. In 2006, she collaborated with Iñárritu again in Babel, for which she received a nomination for the Academy Award for Best Supporting Actress.

Barraza is known in Mexico as Master Barraza from her partnership with Mexican director Sergio Jiménez, known as El Profe. They created the Actors Workshop in Mexico City, teaching and developing their own version of Method acting. Barraza began her career directing telenovela episodes, the actors in which she would also coach. In the 1990s she decided to step in front of the camera.

She currently operates her own acting school located in Miami, Florida titled Adriana Barraza's Black Box. Instructors at the school include her husband Arnaldo and daughter Carolina.

In 1985, Barraza moved to Mexico City, to work as a theatre director. Since 1985, Barraza has guest starred and directed the Mexican television show Mujer, Casos de la Vida Real, alongside host Silvia Pinal. She has also been a part of the telenovela ensembles of Bajo un Mismo Rostro playing Elvira, La Paloma as Madre Clara and Imperio de Cristal as Flora. In 1997 she took on the role of Nurse Clara Dominguez in Alguna Vez Tendremos Alas.

Barraza directed Locura de Amor (in which she also starred), Nunca Te Olvidare and El Manantial.

Barraza appeared in the films Henry Poole Is Here, Drag Me to Hell, And Soon the Darkness. In 2011, Barraza's latest films included From Prada to Nada and Thor (in which her part was cut down). She had a recurring role as Guadalupe Elizalde, on the FX television series The Strain. In 2014 she starred in the film Cake opposite Jennifer Aniston.

She is also a professional acting coach and has worked with actors for a number of films and television shows, including the American film Spanglish. Barraza worked for Telemundo as an acting instructor, teaching accents to actors and actresses from all over Latin America, giving them a more Mexican lilt and sound appropriate for their character.

== Personal life ==
She became pregnant at age 18 with her daughter, actress Carolina Valsagna (b. 1975). The father of her daughter is not known, as he abandoned her. Her first husband was Carlos Valsagna, whom she married in 1978, and he adopted her daughter and gave her his name. Her second husband is Arnaldo Pipke. Barraza studied acting through the Fine Arts School at Autonomous University of Chihuahua.

== Filmography ==
Key
†	Denotes films that have not yet been released

Table featuring feature films with Adriana Barraza
Year	Title	Role	Notes
1998	The First Night	Bruno's mother	
1999	La paloma de Marsella	Felicia	
2000	Amores perros	Octavio's mother	
2001	La segunda noche	Lulú and Laura's mother	
2006	Babel	Amelia	
2007	...Y solo humo	Toña	Short film
2008	Henry Poole Is Here	Esperanza Martinez	
2009	Rage	Anita de Los Ángeles	
2009	Drag Me to Hell	Shaun San Dena	
2009	Tres piezas de amor en un fin de semana	Sofía	
2010	Revolución	Chayo	
2010	And Soon the Darkness	Rosamaría	
2010	Sucedió en un día	Madre	
2010	Burning Palms	Louisa Álvarez	
2010	Cerro Bayo	Marta	
2010	Te presento a Laura	Conchita	
2011	From Prada to Nada	Aurelia Jimenez	
2011	Thor	Isabella Álvarez	Deleted scenes
2012	El Cartel de los Sapos	La abuela	
2012	Mariachi Gringo	Magdalena	
2013	Guten Tag, Ramón	Esperanza	
2014	Cake	Silvana	
2015	Wild Horses	Mrs. Davis	
2016	Todo lo Demás	Doña Flor	
2019	Dora and the Lost City of Gold	Abuelita Valerie	
2019	Coyote Lake	Teresa	
2019	Rambo: Last Blood	Maria Beltran	
2020	We Can Be Heroes	Anita Moreno	
2021	Koati	Amaya	Voice role
2022	Monica	Leticia	
2023	Dark Obsession	Camila	
2023	Blue Beetle	Nana	
2023	Where the Tracks End	Teacher Georgina	
2024	My Penguin Friend	Maria	
2025	The Follies	Irene	
2026	Runner	Donna Zaldívar	
TBA	Cut Off †		Post-production

Table featuring television with Adriana Barraza
Year	Title	Role	Notes
1985–2003	Mujer, Casos de la Vida Real	Lupe	Appeared in 8 episodes from 1985 to 2003
1993	Los cosas simples	—N/a	Television film
1994–1995	Imperio de cristal	Flora	34 episodes
1995	Bajo un mismo rostro	Elvira	100 episodes
1995	La paloma	Madre Clara	3 episodes
1996	La culpa	Trabajadora Social	Special appearance
1997	Alguna vez tendremos alas	Clara Domínguez	4 episodes
1998	Vivo por Elena	Hilda 'La Machín'	Episode: "#1.1"
1999	Nunca te olvidaré	—N/a	92 episodes; Also director
2000	Locura de amor	Soledad Retana	Episode: "#1.1"; Also director
2001	Aventuras en el tiempo	—N/a	104 episodes; Also director
2001	El Manantial	—N/a	94 episodes; Also director
2002	Cómplices Al Rescate	—N/a	128 episodes; Also director
2003	Clase 406	Mabel	3 episodes; special appearance
2007	ER	Dolores Salazar	Episode: "Skye's the Limit"
2008	Tiempo Final	—N/a	Episode: "Reality Show"
2008	CSI: Miami	Carmen Delko	Episode: "The DeLuca Motel"
2014–2016	The Strain	Guadalupe Elizalde	8 episodes
2015	Dueños del paraíso	Irene Medrano	61 episodes
2016–2017	Silvana sin lana	Trinidad "Trini" Altamirano de Rivapalacios	116 episodes
2018	Al otro lado del muro	Carmen Rosales de Romero	60 episodes
2018	The Inmate	Guadelupe Mendoza	Episode: "#1.8"
2019	Snowfall	Mariela Villanueva	3 episodes
2020	Penny Dreadful: City of Angels	Maria Vega	10 episodes
2021	Bingo Hell	Lupita	Television film
2022	Diary of a Gigolo	Minou	10 episodes
2026	Una familia complicada †	Telma	
TBA	El Gato †	Alma	Post-production

== Awards and nominations ==
Year	Award	Category	Work	Result
2006	About.com	Best Supporting Actress in a Motion Picture	Babel	Won
2006	Academy Award	Best Performance by an Actress in a Supporting Role	Babel	Nominated
2006	Broadcast Film Critics Association	Best Supporting Actress in a Motion Picture	Babel	Nominated
2006	Chicago Film Critics Association	Best Supporting Actress in a Motion Picture	Babel	Nominated
2006	Golden Globe Awards	Best Supporting Actress – Motion Picture	Babel	Nominated
2006	Gotham Awards	Best Ensemble Cast	Babel	Won
2006	Imagen Awards	Imagen Award for Best Supporting Actress	Babel	Nominated
2006	Online Film Critics Society	Best Supporting Actress in a Motion Picture	Babel	Nominated
2006	Palm Springs International Film Festival	Palm Springs International Film Festival Award for Best Ensemble Cast	Babel	Won
2006	San Francisco Film Critics Circle	Best Supporting Actress in a Motion Picture	Babel	Won
2006	Screen Actors Guild Award	Outstanding Performance by a Female Actor in a Supporting Role	Babel	Nominated
2006	Screen Actors Guild Award	Outstanding Performance by a Cast in a Motion Picture	Babel	Nominated
2007	ALMA Award	Outstanding Actress in a Motion Picture	Babel	Won
2011	Imagen Awards	Imagen Award for Best Supporting Actress	From Prada to Nada	Nominated
2017	Ariel Awards	Best Actress	Todo lo Demás	Nominated

== See also ==
- List of Mexican Academy Award winners and nominees
- List of actors with Academy Award nominations
- List of actors nominated for Academy Awards for non-English performances
