= Iñárritu (surname) =

Iñárritu or Iñarritu is a Basque surname. Notable people with the surname include:

- Alejandro González Iñárritu (born 1963), Mexican film director, producer and screenwriter
- Jon Iñarritu (born 1979), Basque politician
- José Alberto Aguilar Iñárritu (born 1954), Mexican economist and politician
