= Death Trilogy =

Death Trilogy can refer to

- Films of Alejandro González Iñárritu
- Films of Gus Van Sant
- An omnibus collecting Terry Pratchett's first three Death novels: Mort, Reaper Man and Soul Music
