= Alejandro González Iñárritu =

Mexican filmmaker (born 1963)

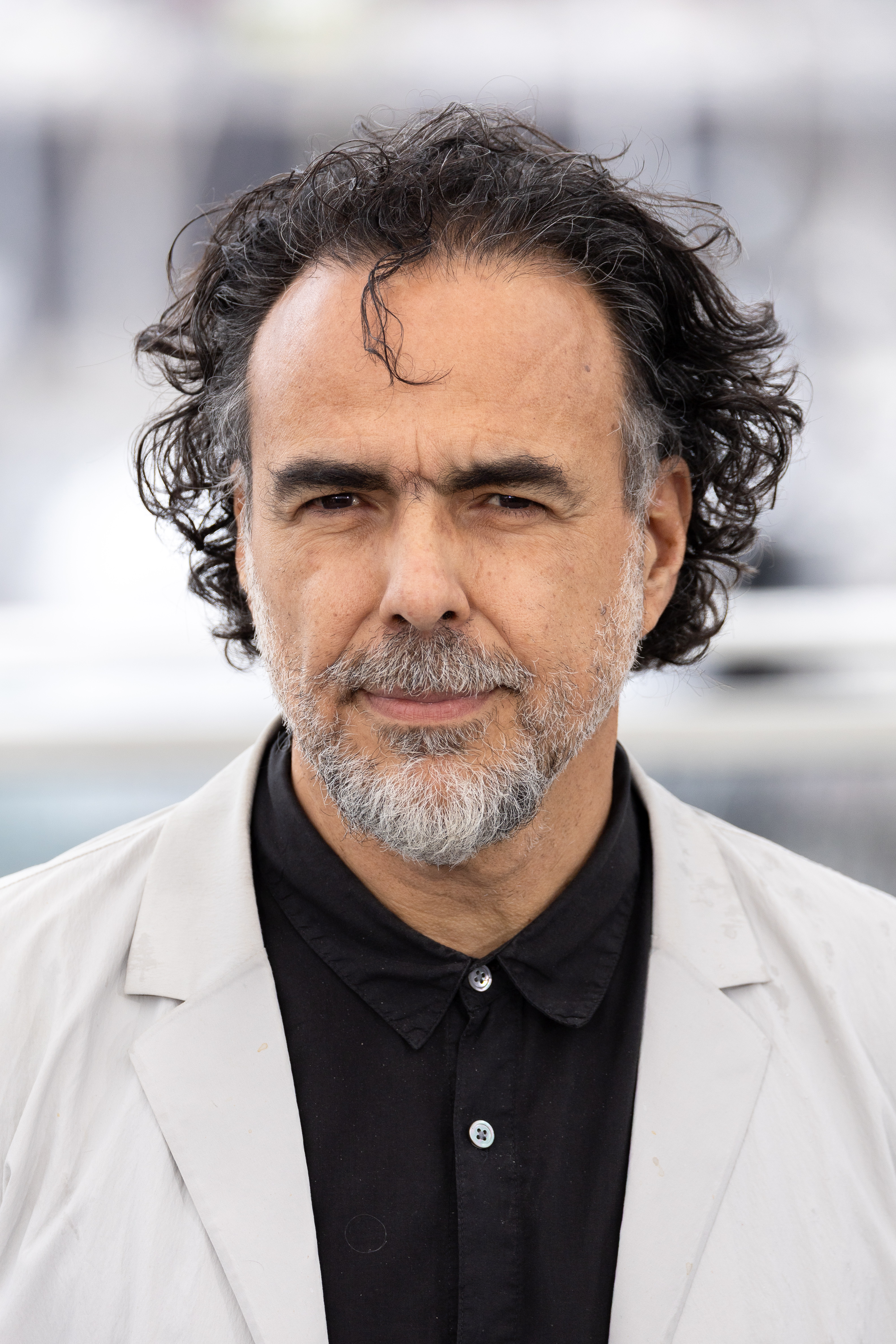
- Iñárritu at the 2025 Cannes Film Festival
- Born: 15 August 1963 (age 63); Mexico City, Mexico
- Other name: Alejandro G. Iñárritu
- Education: Universidad Iberoamericana
- Occupations: Film director; producer; screenwriter; editor
- Years active: 1984–present
- Notable work: Full list
- Spouse: Maria Eladia Hagerman
- Children: 2
- Awards: Full list
- Honours: Commandeur de l'Ordre des Arts et des Lettres (2019)

Alejandro González Iñárritu (Note: /ɪnˈjɑːrɪtuː/ in-YAR-ih-too; American Spanish: [aleˈxandɾo‿ɣonˈsales iˈɲaritu]; credited since 2014 as Alejandro G. Iñárritu) (born 15 August 1963) is a Mexican filmmaker. He is primarily known for making modern psychological drama films about the human condition. His films are Amores perros (2000), 21 Grams (2003), Babel (2006), Biutiful (2010), Birdman (2014), The Revenant (2015), Bardo (2022), and Digger (2026). Iñárritu's projects have garnered critical acclaim and numerous accolades, including four Academy Awards, three BAFTA Awards, and four Golden Globe Awards.

In 2006, Iñárritu won the Best Director Award at the Cannes Film Festival. In 2019, Iñárritu was president of the jury for the 72nd Cannes Film Festival.

Iñárritu was awarded the Academy Award for Best Director for Birdman (2014) and for The Revenant (2015), making him the third director to win the award back-to-back, following in the footsteps of John Ford and Joseph L. Mankiewicz. To date, he is the only director in history to have won the DGA Award for Outstanding Directing two years in a row.

Iñárritu was later awarded a Special Achievement Academy Award for his virtual reality installation Carne y Arena (2017), the first ever VR installation to be presented at the Cannes Film Festival.

== Early life ==
Iñárritu was born on 15 August 1963 in Mexico City, the youngest of seven siblings, to Luz María Iñárritu and Héctor González Gama. His maternal grandfather, Alfredo Iñárritu y Ramírez de Aguilar, was a prominent lawyer, judge, and justice of the Supreme Court of Mexico with partial Basque origins. The surname Iñárritu is of Basque origin. Héctor was a banker who owned a ranch, but went bankrupt when Iñárritu was five. A poor student, Iñárritu was expelled from high school at the age of 16 or 17 due to poor grades and misbehavior. He briefly ran off with a girl from a wealthy family to Acapulco, having been influenced by the Miloš Forman film Hair, but returned to Mexico City after a week.

Soon after, Iñárritu left home and worked as a sailor on cargo boats, taking two trips at the ages of 16 and 18, sailing through the Mississippi River and then visiting Europe and Africa. With $1,000 supplied by his father, Iñárritu stayed in Europe for a year on the second trip. Around this time, Iñárritu had the opportunity to watch the Palme d'Or-winning film Yol by world-famous Kurdish director Yılmaz Güney. Iñárritu was very impressed by Yol and later said in interviews that this film was the reason he turned to cinema. According to some Turkish journalists, the scene in The Revenant (2015) where Leonardo DiCaprio enters the belly of a dying horse was a reference to Yılmaz Güney and his film Yol, because there was a similar scene in that film.

He has noted that these early travels as a young man have had a great influence on him as a filmmaker, and the settings of his films have often been in the places he visited during this period. After his travels, Iñárritu returned to Mexico City and majored in communications at Universidad Iberoamericana.

== Career ==
=== 1984–1999: Early career ===
Iñárritu began his career in 1984 as a radio host at the Mexican radio station WFM, the country's most popular rock music station, where he "pieced together playlists into a loose narrative arc". He worked with and interviewed artists like Robert Plant, David Gilmour, Elton John, Bob Geldof, and Carlos Santana. He also wrote and broadcast small audio stories and storytelling promos. He later became the youngest producer for Televisa, the largest mass media company in Latin America. From 1987 to 1989, he composed music for six Mexican feature films. During this time, Iñárritu became acquainted with Mexican writer Guillermo Arriaga, beginning their screenwriting collaborations. Iñárritu has stated that he believes music has had a bigger influence on him as an artist than film itself. In the early 1990s, Iñárritu created Z Films, a production company, with Raúl Olvera in Mexico. Under Z Films, he started writing, producing and directing short films and advertisements. Making the final transition into TV and film directing, he studied under well-known theater director Ludwik Margules, as well as Judith Weston in Los Angeles. In 1995, Iñárritu wrote and directed his first TV pilot for Z Films, called Detrás del dinero, or Behind the Money, starring Miguel Bosé.

=== 2000–2009: Directorial debut and breakthrough ===
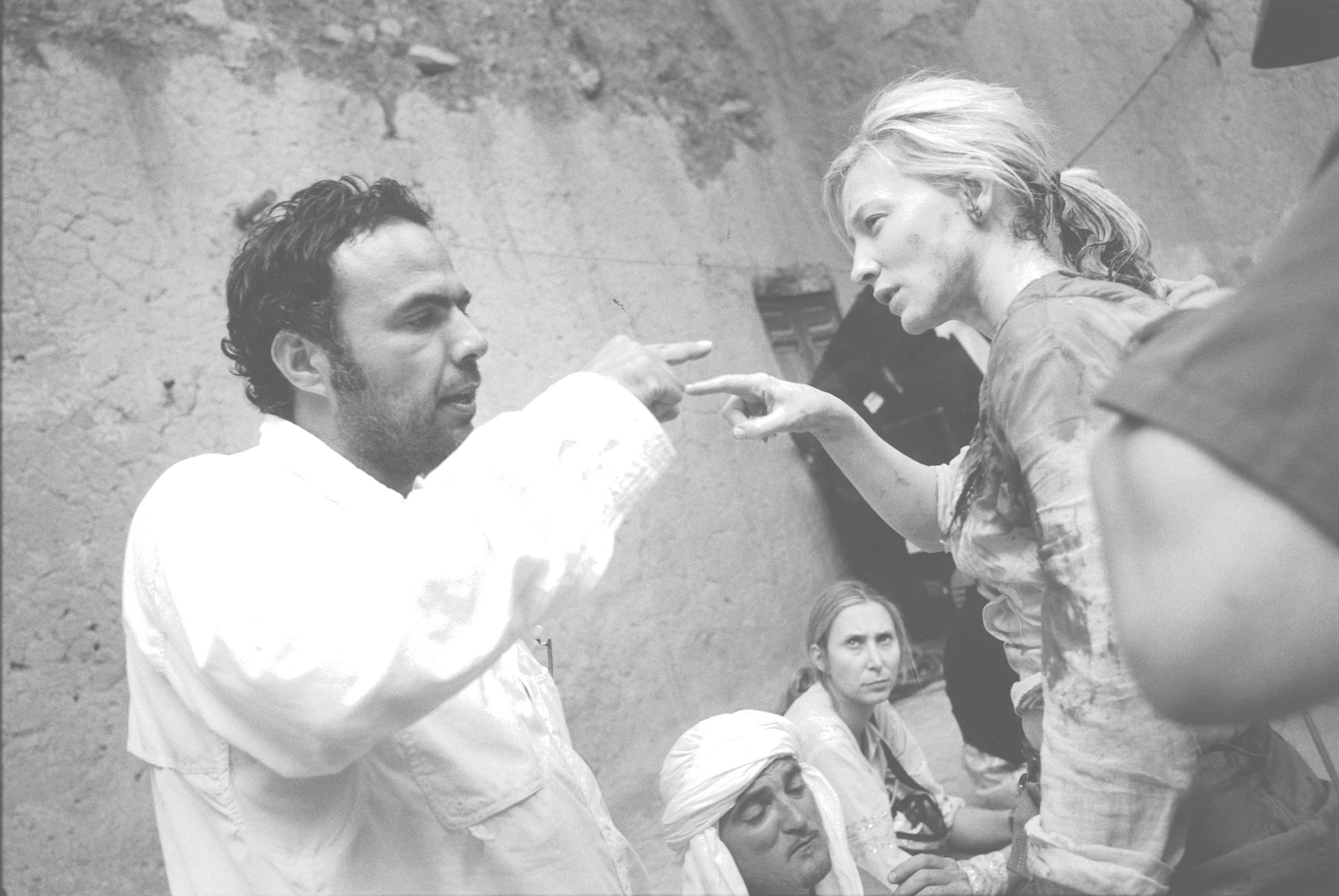
Iñárritu and Cate Blanchett on the set of Babel

In 2000, Iñárritu directed his first feature film Amores perros, written by Guillermo Arriaga. Amores perros explored Mexican society in Mexico City told via three intertwining stories. In 2000, Amores perros premiered at the Cannes Film Festival and won the Critics' Week Grand Prize. It was the film debut of actor Gael García Bernal, who would later appear in Babel and the Iñárritu-produced Mexican film Rudo y Cursi. Amores perros was the first installment in Iñárritu's and Arriaga's thematic "Death trilogy", and nominated for the Academy Award for Best Foreign Language Film. In 2002, Iñárritu directed "Powder Keg", an episode for the BMW short film series The Hire, starring Clive Owen as the driver and Stellan Skarsgård as a war photographer. It won the Cannes Gold Lion Advertising Award.

After the success of Amores Perros, Iñárritu and Arriaga revisited the intersected-stories structure of Amores perros in Iñárritu's second feature film, 21 Grams (2003). The film starred Benicio del Toro, Naomi Watts and Sean Penn. It was selected to compete for the Golden Lion at the Venice Film Festival, where Penn received the Volpi Cup for Best Actor. At the 76th Academy Awards, Del Toro and Watts received nominations for their performances. From 2001 to 2011, Iñárritu directed several short films. In 2001, he directed an 11-minute film segment for 11'09"01 September 11 - which is composed of several short films that explore the effects of the 9/11 terrorist attacks from different points of view around the world. In 2007, he made ANNA, part of French anthology film Chacun son cinéma, which screened at the 2007 Cannes Film Festival. Chacun son cinéma, a collection of 33 short films by 35 renowned film directors representing 25 countries, was produced for the 60th anniversary of the film festival. In 2012, Iñárritu made the experimental short film Naran Ja: One Act Orange Dance, inspired by L.A Dance Project's premiere performance, featuring excerpts from the new choreography Benjamin Millepied crafted for Moving Parts. The story takes place in a secluded, dusty space and centers around LADP dancer Julia Eichten.

Iñárritu embarked on his third and last film that formed the "Death Trilogy", Babel (2006), written again by Arriaga. Babel comprises four interrelated stories set in Morocco, Mexico, the United States, and Japan, in four different languages. The film stars Brad Pitt, Cate Blanchett, Adriana Barraza, Gael Garcia Bernal, Rinko Kikuchi and Kōji Yakusho. The rest of the cast comprised non-professional actors. The film competed at the 2006 Cannes Film Festival, where Iñárritu received the Best Director Award (Prix de la mise en scène), becoming the first Mexican-born director to win the award. Babel was a critical and box office success. It received seven nominations at the 79th Academy Awards, including Best Picture and Best Director. Gustavo Santaolalla, the film's composer, won the Academy Award for Best Original Score. The film won the Golden Globe Award for Best Motion Picture – Drama in 2007. Iñárritu became the first Mexican director to be nominated for the Academy Award for Best Directing and the Directors Guild of America Award for Outstanding Directing. After this third feature film collaboration with writing partner Arriaga, Iñárritu and he professionally parted ways, following Iñárritu's barring of Arriaga from the set during filming. Arriaga told the Los Angeles Times in 2009, "It had to come to an end, but I still respect [González Iñárritu]."

=== 2010–2019: Prominence and acclaim ===
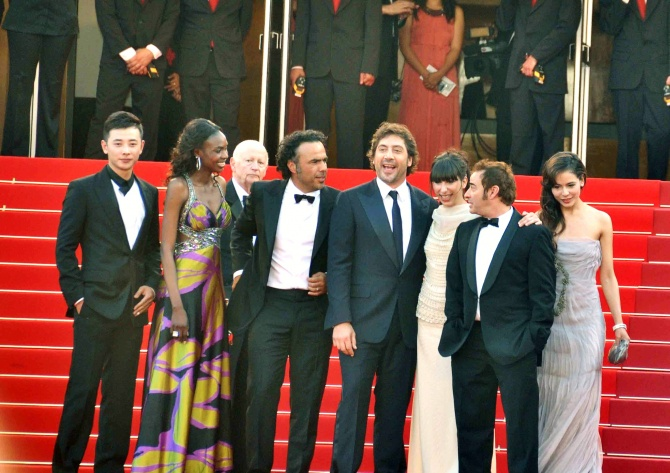
Iñárritu and the Biutiful cast at Cannes Film Festival

In 2010, Iñárritu directed and produced Biutiful, starring Javier Bardem, written by Iñárritu, Armando Bó Jr., and Nicolás Giacobone. The film premiered at the Cannes Film Festival in May 2010. Bardem went on to win Best Actor (shared with Elio Germano for La nostra vita) at Cannes. Biutiful is Iñárritu's first film in his native Spanish since his debut feature Amores perros. The film was nominated at the 2011 Golden Globes for Best Foreign Language Film, and at the BAFTA Awards for Best Film Not in the English Language and Best Actor. For the second time in his career, Iñárritu's film was nominated for Best Foreign Language Film at the Academy Awards; Javier Bardem's performance was also nominated for the Academy Award for Best Actor. In 2010, Iñárritu directed "Write the Future", a football-themed commercial for Nike ahead of the 2010 FIFA World Cup, which went on to win the Grand Prix at the Cannes Lions Advertising Festival. In 2012, he directed Procter & Gamble's "Best Job" commercial spot for the 2012 Olympic Ceremonies. It won the Best Primetime Commercial Emmy at Creative Arts Emmy Awards and the DGA Award for Outstanding Directorial Achievement in Commercials. On 4 October 2012, Facebook released an Iñárritu-directed brand film titled The Things That Connect Us to celebrate the social network reaching one billion users.

In December 2013, Warner Bros. hired Iñárritu to direct a live-action adaptation of Rudyard Kipling's 1894 book The Jungle Book. Eventually, Andy Serkis directed the film titled Mowgli: Legend of the Jungle (2018). In 2014, Iñárritu won three Academy Awards for directing, co-writing and co-producing Best Picture winner Birdman or (The Unexpected Virtue of Ignorance), starring Michael Keaton, Edward Norton, Emma Stone, Naomi Watts, Zach Galifianakis, and Andrea Riseborough. The film is an existential dark comedy exploring the ego of a forgotten superhero actor, experienced as if filmed on a single shot. It was the first time a Mexican Filmmaker received Best Picture at the Academy Awards. He also won the Golden Globe Award for Best Screenplay, a DGA Award and a PGA Award for the film. Iñárritu was also set to direct and produce the tv series One Percent, an organic farming drama which he co-created with Alexander Dinelaris, Nicolas Giacobone, and Armando Bo for Starz. Starz gave the show a straight-to-series order, but dropped out in 2017 as the U.S. broadcaster of the series, with production company MRC shopping the project to other networks or streaming platforms.

In 2015, Iñárritu directed The Revenant, initially adapted by Mark L. Smith, before joined the writing process, based on Michael Punke's novel of the same name. The film is a remake of the film Man in the Wilderness (1971) and starred Leonardo DiCaprio, Tom Hardy, and Domhnall Gleeson. It is a "gritty" 19th-century period drama-thriller about fur trapper Hugh Glass, a real person who joined the Rocky Mountain Fur Company on a "journey into the wild" and was robbed and abandoned after being mauled by a grizzly bear. The film considers the nature and stresses on relationships under the duress of the wilderness, and issues of revenge and pardon via Glass's pursuit of the man who was responsible for his hardship. The Revenant took nine months to shoot. With The Revenant being a critical and commercial success, Iñárritu won a second consecutive Oscar for Best Director and the film was nominated for 12 Academy Awards, including Best Picture and Best Director, winning Best Director, Best Cinematography and Best Actor. Iñárritu is one of only three directors to ever win consecutive Oscars, and the first to do it in 65 years. He was also nominated for four Golden Globe Awards, winning three, including Best Motion Picture – Drama and Best Director; received nine Critics' Choice Movie Awards nominations, including Best Picture and Best Director; five BAFTAs including Best Picture and Best Director; and a DGA Award, making history as the first person to ever win two in a row.

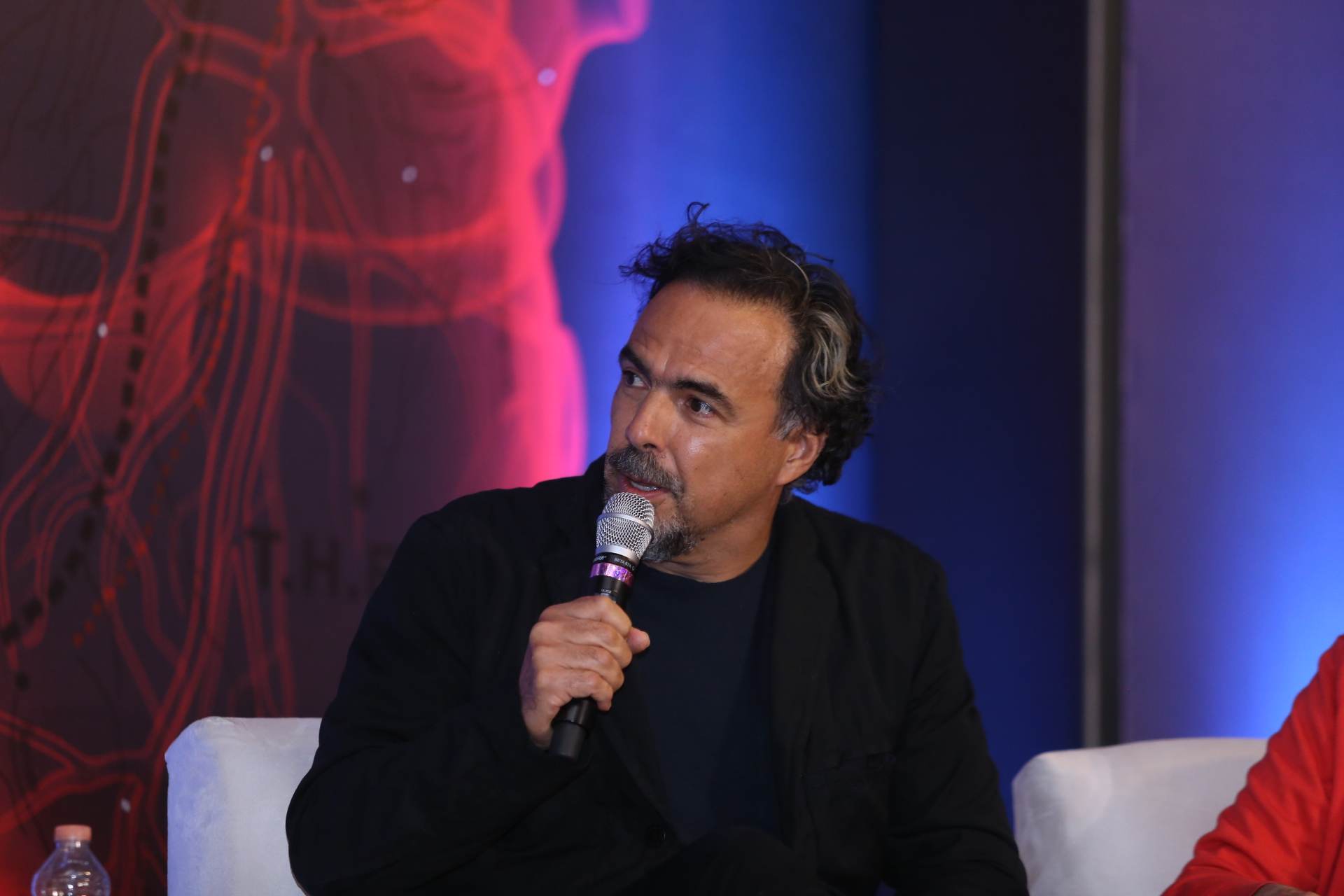
Iñárritu at the Cannes Film Festival 2019

The One Percent, originally planned as an upcoming American television drama series created and written by Iñárritu, Alexander Dinelaris Jr., Nicolás Giacobone and Armando Bó, was eventually postponed on early March 2017 due to Alejandro feeling burnt out after the production of The Revenant. The quartet, who also collaborated on Birdman, were to serve as executive producers. Iñárritu was set to direct the first two episodes and set the visual style of the show. Iñárritu's virtual reality project Carne y Arena was the first ever VR installation presented at the Cannes Film Festival in 2017. Carne y Arena was also presented, at LACMA, Washington, D.C., and featured at the Prada Foundation in Milan. Additionally, Carne y Arena was awarded the first Special Achievement Academy Award in over 20 years at the Academy's 9th Annual Governors Awards.

=== 2020–present ===
Iñárritu co-wrote, co-produced and directed the 2022 Spanish-language film Bardo, False Chronicle of a Handful of Truths, starring Daniel Giménez Cacho and Griselda Siciliani. It is his first film made in Mexico since Amores Perros (2000). It premiered at the 79th Venice International Film Festival, where it competed for the Golden Lion and was later distributed by Netflix. Bardo polarized critics and received mixed reviews. Film critic Wendy Ide of The Guardian called the film "occasionally brilliant" and "audacious, bold film-making" but "cluttered with symbolism and bloated with self-regard". Iñárritu described the response from critics as being "racist" saying, "You can like it or not — that's not the discussion. But for me, there's a kind of racist undercurrent where because I'm Mexican, I'm pretentious". It earned a nomination for the Academy Award for Best Cinematography at the 95th Academy Awards.

In February 2024, it was announced that he is co-writing and directing a then-untitled English-language film distributed by Warner Bros. Pictures, with Legendary Pictures co-producing, later revealed in December 2025 as Digger. The film released on October 2, 2026, starring Tom Cruise in the lead role alongside Sandra Hüller, John Goodman, Michael Stuhlbarg, Jesse Plemons, Sophie Wilde, Riz Ahmed, and Emma D'Arcy in supporting roles.

In May 2026, Iñárritu became the first filmmaker to be inducted into El Colegio Nacional, a prestigious Mexican honorary academy.

Iñárritu is an executive producer of the film Porto Rico, starring Bad Bunny, Edward Norton, Javier Bardem, and Viggo Mortensen.

== Influences ==
Iñarritu's cinematic influences include Max Ophüls, Robert Altman, Sidney Lumet, Ingmar Bergman, Federico Fellini, Luis Buñuel, Andrei Tarkovsky, Sergio Leone, Martin Scorsese, Yılmaz Güney, and John Cassavetes. However, his influences are not limited to film and come from a variety of sources.

== Personal life ==
Iñárritu has been diagnosed with ADHD.

He is married to Maria Eladia Hagerman, an editor and graphic designer. They have a daughter and a son. He lives in Los Angeles.

In 2009, Iñárritu, along with several filmmakers and actors, signed a petition in support of director Roman Polanski, who had been detained while traveling to a film festival following Polanski's arrest in relation to his 1977 sexual abuse charges, which the petition argued would undermine the tradition of film festivals as a place for works to be shown "freely and safely", and that arresting filmmakers traveling to neutral countries could open the door "for actions of which no-one can know the effects".

== Filmography ==
Year	Title	Distribution
2000	Amores perros	Nu Vision
2003	21 Grams	Focus Features
2006	Babel	Paramount Pictures / Summit Entertainment
2010	Biutiful	Universal Pictures
2014	Birdman or (The Unexpected Virtue of Ignorance)	Fox Searchlight Pictures
2015	The Revenant	20th Century Fox
2022	Bardo, False Chronicle of a Handful of Truths	Netflix
2026	Digger: A Comedy of Catastrophic Proportions	Warner Bros. Pictures

== Accolades and honors ==
Iñárritu has been recognized with multiple awards for his films, including five Academy Awards, two Directors Guild of America Awards, a Producers Guild of America Award, three British Academy Film Awards, three AACTA Awards, three Golden Globe Awards, two Independent Spirit Awards, two American Film Institute Awards, and three Cannes Film Festival Award. He is the first Mexican director to be nominated for the Academy Award for Best Director and the Directors Guild of America Award for Outstanding Directing, and the first to win the Best Director Award at the Cannes Film Festival. In 2015, Iñárritu won, among many other accolades, the Directors Guild Award for Outstanding Directing, the Producers Guild of America Award for Best Theatrical Motion Picture, and the Academy Award for Best Picture, Best Original Screenplay and Best Directing for Birdman, becoming the first Mexican to win three Academy Awards. In 2016, Iñárritu won the Academy Award for Best Director for his work on The Revenant, marking the first time in 65 years that a director has won the award in two consecutive years. Iñárritu is the third director to accomplish this feat, following John Ford and Joseph L. Mankiewicz.

In 2006, Iñárritu was honored at the Gotham Awards' World Cinema Tribute, alongside fellow Mexican filmmakers Alfonso Cuarón and Guillermo del Toro. In 2011, he was honored with a Lifetime Achievement Award at Zurich Film Festival. In 2015, Iñárritu received the Sundance Institute's Vanguard Leadership Award for the "originality and independent spirit" of his films. He was also honored by the Los Angeles County Museum of Art at its Art + Film Gala. That year, he received an honorary doctorate from the National Autonomous University of Mexico. In 2016, he was awarded an honorary Doctor of Fine Arts from the University of Southern California. In 2019, he was also made Commander of the Order of the Arts and Letters in France. On May 26, 2026 González Iñárritu gave his inaugural speech "La alucinación consensuada" as member of El Colegio Nacional in Mexico City, the highest honorary institution dedicated to the promotion of scientific, artistic, and humanistic culture.

Awards and nominations received by Iñárritu's films
Year	Title	Academy Awards		BAFTA Awards		Golden Globe Awards	
Year	Title	Nominations	Wins	Nominations	Wins	Nominations	Wins
2000	Amores perros	1		1	1	1	
2003	21 Grams	2		5			
2006	Babel	7	1	7	1	7	1
2010	Biutiful	2		2		1	
2014	Birdman	9	4	10	1	7	2
2015	The Revenant	12	3	8	5	4	3
2017	Flesh and Sand	1	1				
2022	Bardo	1					
Total		35	8	33	8	20	6

Directed Academy Award performances
Under Iñárritu's direction, these actors have received Academy Award nominations (and one win) for their performances in their respective roles.

Year	Performer	Film	Result
Academy Award for Best Actor
2010	Javier Bardem	Biutiful	Nominated
2014	Michael Keaton	Birdman	Nominated
2015	Leonardo DiCaprio	The Revenant	Won
Academy Award for Best Actress
2003	Naomi Watts	21 Grams	Nominated
Academy Award for Best Supporting Actor
2003	Benicio del Toro	21 Grams	Nominated
2014	Edward Norton	Birdman	Nominated
2015	Tom Hardy	The Revenant	Nominated
Academy Award for Best Supporting Actress
2007	Adriana Barraza	Babel	Nominated
2007	Rinko Kikuchi	Babel	Nominated
2014	Emma Stone	Birdman	Nominated

== See also ==
- Alejandro González Iñárritu filmography
- Cinema of Mexico
- Cha Cha Cha Films
- List of Mexican Academy Award winners and nominees
- List of people who have won multiple Academy Awards in a single year
