= Write the Future =

Television advertisement

- Agency: Wieden+Kennedy
- Client: Nike
- Running time: 3:04
- Product: Nike Football sportswear
- Release date: 2010
- Written by: Mark Bernath; Eric Quennoy; Stuart Harkness; Freddie Powell
- Directed by: Alejandro González Iñárritu
- Music by: Thijs van Leer and Jan Akkerman ("Hocus Pocus")
- Starring: Didier Drogba Fabio Cannavaro Wayne Rooney Franck Ribéry Ronaldinho Cristiano Ronaldo
- Production company: Independent Films Limited
- Produced by: Elissa Singstock; Olivier Klonhammer

Write the Future is an advert made by Nike Football for the 2010 World Cup and directed by Mexican filmmaker Alejandro González Iñárritu for the UK based production company, Independent Films Limited. The full version is over three minutes in length and features football players Didier Drogba, Fabio Cannavaro, Wayne Rooney, Franck Ribéry, Ronaldinho, and Cristiano Ronaldo as its main players. All of the players play in a scenario during a World Cup match and after significant events occur, they usually experience a ripple effect outside the world of football. The advert aired during the 2010 FIFA World Cup. It features the song "Hocus Pocus", by progressive rock band Focus. It was created by Wieden+Kennedy and produced by Elissa Singstock and Olivier Klonhammer, written by Mark Bernath, Eric Quennoy, Stuart Harkness and Freddie Powell. The sound design and mix were done by Raja Sehgal working out of Grand Central Recording Studios in London. The advertisement won the Film Grand Prix at the 2011 Cannes Lions festival.

== Plot ==
Didier Drogba is seen making a run towards goal against Italy, with Fabio Cannavaro in hot pursuit. As Drogba moves and shoots for a goal, the scene shifts to broadcasters both at the stadium and in studios across Africa, beaming at his efforts. The scene shifts back to Côte d'Ivoire, where a massive street party is erupting ahead of his assumed goal. However, Cannavaro makes an impressive goal-line clearance. The scene then shifts to him being the guest of honor on a Mediaset-style Italian variety program. Dancers, wearing sequined variations of his #6 shirt, re-enact the clearance while suspended on wires, while crooner Bobby Solo sings a song with the lyrics "C'è Cannavaro! C'è capitano!"

The ball then comes to Wayne Rooney, who (with time running out) is looking to make a move against France. He attempts to pick out Theo Walcott with a pass as thousands of English fans, both in the stadium and watching at home, urge him forward. Rooney makes the pass. However, it is intercepted by Franck Ribéry, and the resulting reaction from the British public is shown. Riots break out in the streets, the stock market plunges, young fans tear down posters of Rooney from their bedroom walls, and a tabloid headline reads "ENGLAND IN ROO-INS!" - (read, with approval, by Tim Howard and Landon Donovan). Rooney eventually plunges into obscurity, bearded and overweight, working as a groundsman at a small football club and living in a caravan beneath a billboard of Ribéry. This reflects and mimics a previous ad for Nike, seen earlier in the commercial, where Rooney was painted to look like the St George's Cross. Having seen his "future", we cut back to present-day Rooney, sprinting after Ribéry and making a clean tackle. As the crowd chants his name, the reactions to this are shown. He is knighted, a tabloid shows his face carved into the Cliffs of Dover with the headline "JUST ROO IT!" (read and thrown away by Andrés Iniesta, Gerard Piqué and Cesc Fàbregas). The stock market reaches record highs, scores of babies are named "Wayne", and he even beats Roger Federer in a game of table tennis.

The ball then comes to Brazilian defender Thiago Silva, who springs Ronaldinho into the corner. Faced by a defender, he then executes a number of step-overs, which become a viral video re-enacted and shared millions of times. The step-over even inspire an exercise video called "RON'S SAMBA-ROBICS" and Kobe Bryant celebrates a late 3-point basket by doing the step-over.

Ronaldinho's eventual cross is chested down by Cristiano Ronaldo, who sprints upfield with the ball past Holland. We are shown scenes of Ronaldo's celebrity: he cuts the ribbon on the "Estádio Cristiano Ronaldo", a cameo on The Simpsons where he appears on the doorstep of 742 Evergreen Terrace and nutmegs Homer Simpson (who reacts with a characteristic "Ronal-D'OH!"), the premiere of Ronaldo: The Movie starring Gael García Bernal as Ronaldo...until he is grabbed and taken down by a Dutch defender. As he sets up for the free-kick, the scenes of Ronaldo preparing to strike the ball are intercut with his potential "future": the unveiling of a giant statue of Ronaldo in a Portuguese square.

== Notable stars ==
Notable people seen in the advert, in order of appearance:

- Didier Drogba
- Fabio Cannavaro
- Bobby Solo
- Wayne Rooney
- Lassana Diarra
- Theo Walcott
- Patrice Evra
- Franck Ribéry
- Tim Howard
- Landon Donovan
- Jérémy Toulalan
- Cesc Fàbregas
- Andrés Iniesta
- Gerard Piqué
- Roger Federer
- Thiago Silva
- Luís Fabiano
- Ronaldinho
- Alejandro González Iñárritu
- Kobe Bryant
- Cristiano Ronaldo
- Homer Simpson
- Gael García Bernal
- André Ooijer

Preceded by The Man Your Man Could Smell Like	Cannes Lions Film Grand Prix Winner; 2011	Succeeded by Back to the Start
