= 21 Grams =

2003 film by Alejandro González Iñárritu

- Theatrical release poster
- Directed by: Alejandro González Iñárritu
- Written by: Guillermo Arriaga
- Produced by: Alejandro González Iñárritu; Robert Salerno
- Starring: Sean Penn; Naomi Watts; Benicio del Toro; Melissa Leo; Charlotte Gainsbourg
- Cinematography: Rodrigo Prieto
- Edited by: Stephen Mirrione
- Music by: Gustavo Santaolalla
- Production company: This is that
- Distributed by: Focus Features
- Release dates: September 5, 2003 (Venice); November 21, 2003 (United States)
- Running time: 124 minutes
- Country: United States
- Language: English
- Budget: $20 million
- Box office: $60.4 million

21 Grams is a 2003 American crime thriller film co-produced and directed by Alejandro González Iñárritu and written by Guillermo Arriaga. The film stars Sean Penn, Naomi Watts, Charlotte Gainsbourg, Danny Huston, and Benicio Del Toro. The second part of Arriaga's and Iñárritu's "Trilogy of Death", preceded by Amores perros (2000) and followed by Babel (2006), 21 Grams interweaves several plot lines in a nonlinear arrangement.

The film's plot is about the consequences of a tragic hit-and-run accident. Penn plays a critically ill mathematician, Watts plays a grief-stricken mother, and Del Toro plays a born-again Christian ex-convict whose faith is sorely tested in the aftermath of the accident. The three main characters each have "past", "present" and "future" story threads, which are shown as non-linear fragments that punctuate elements of the overall story, all imminently coming toward each other and coalescing as the story progresses. Critics gave the film generally favorable reviews, praising Iñárritu's direction, Arriaga's screenplay, and Watts' and Del Toro's performances. 21 Grams made $60.4 million at the box office on a $20 million budget. Watts and Del Toro were nominated for Best Actress and Best Supporting Actor at the 76th Academy Awards.

== Plot ==
The story is told in a nonlinear manner. The following is a chronological summary of the plot:

Jack Jordan is a former convict who is using his new-found religious faith to recover from drug addiction and alcoholism. Paul Rivers is a mathematics professor with a dedicated wife, Mary, and has a fatal heart condition. Unless he receives a new heart from an organ donor, he will not live longer than a month. Mary wants him to donate his sperm so she can have his baby even if he dies. Cristina Peck is a recovering drug addict and now lives a normal suburban life with a supportive husband and two children. She is a loving mother and active swimmer who has left behind her days of drugs and alcohol. These three separate stories/characters become tied together one evening when Jack kills Cristina's husband and children in a hit-and-run accident. Cristina's husband's heart is donated to Paul, who begins his recovery.

Cristina is devastated by the loss and returns to drugs and alcohol. Paul is eager to begin normal life again, but he hesitantly agrees to his wife's idea of artificial insemination as a last-ditch effort to get pregnant. During consultations with a doctor before the procedure, Paul learns about an abortion that Mary had undergone after they had separated in the past. Angered, Paul ends the relationship. He becomes very inquisitive about whose heart he has. He learns from a private detective that the heart belonged to Cristina's husband and begins to follow the widowed Cristina around town.

Jack is stricken with guilt following the accident and starts using drugs again. Despite his wife's protests to keep quiet and conceal his guilt, Jack tells her that his "duty is to God" and turns himself in. While incarcerated, he clashes verbally with a pastor who had helped him after his last incarceration, claims that God had betrayed him, loses his will to live, and attempts suicide. He is released after Cristina declines to press charges against him, as she realizes that incarcerating Jack will not bring her family back. When Jack is released, he is unable to reincorporate himself into normal family life, and instead leaves home to live as a transient, working as a manual laborer.

Paul finds an opportunity to meet Cristina and eventually reveals how the two of them are connected. She is initially furious and forces him out, but soon reconsiders. Desperately needing each other, they continue their relationship. Though Paul has a new heart, his body is rejecting the transplant and his outlook is grim. As Cristina begins to dwell more on her changed life and the death of her family, she becomes obsessed with taking revenge against Jack. She goads Paul into agreeing to murder him.

Paul meets with the private detective who had found Cristina for him. The detective tells Paul that Jack is living in a motel and sells Paul a gun. Paul and Cristina check into the motel where Jack is staying. When Jack is walking alone, Paul grabs him and leads him out into a clearing at gunpoint intending to kill him. However, Paul is unable to kill Jack, who himself is confused, shaking and pleading during the event. Paul fires three shots into the ground and tells Jack to "just disappear," then returns to the motel and lies to Cristina about Jack's death. Later that night, while they are sleeping, Paul and Cristina are awakened by a noise outside their door. It's Jack, who, still consumed by guilt, orders Paul to actually kill him and end his misery. A struggle ensues, during which Cristina blind-sides Jack and starts beating him with a wooden lamp. Paul collapses, suffering an attack, he gets hold of the gun, and shoots himself in the chest.

Jack and Cristina rush Paul to the hospital. Still believing he deserves to be punished for his hit-and-run, Jack tells the police that he was the one who shot Paul, but is released when his story cannot be confirmed. Paul dies, and the conflict between Cristina and Jack remains unresolved (they meet in the waiting room after Paul's death; if they have a conversation, it is not shown). When Cristina offers to donate blood for Paul in the hospital, she learns that she is pregnant; the doctor urges Cristina to quit using drugs. After Paul's death, Cristina is seen tentatively preparing for the new child in one of her daughter's bedrooms, which she had previously been unable to enter after her daughter's death. Jack is shown returning to his family.

== Cast ==
- Sean Penn as Paul Rivers
- Naomi Watts as Cristina Peck
- Benicio del Toro as Jack Jordan
- Charlotte Gainsbourg as Mary Rivers
- Melissa Leo as Marianne Jordan
- Danny Huston as Michael
- Pamela Blair as Doctor
- John Rubinstein as Gynecologist
- Clea DuVall as Claudia
- Eddie Marsan as Reverend John

== Cinematic technique ==
The distinctive stylistic elements of the film's cinematography are its gritty, hand-held shots, the extensive use of the bleach bypass process, and the use of color casts. All these techniques were used to distinguish each character's storyline, to describe the development of the stories, and to mark changes in the character's life balance. Given the non-linear presentation of the events and the interweaving of the three narratives, these elements serve as visual hints to help the viewer collocate the events chronologically. In an interview on American Cinematographer, Rodrigo Prieto pointed out that "there were cues [in the script] to help you understand where you were in the chronology of each story, but I felt we should [have supported] that visually."

Paul's story is pictured with cool colors, Jack's story uses warm colors, and Cristina's story is presented neutrally. In addition, the stories were shot with different film stocks to obtain different grain structures through their progression: "when things were looking up for the characters, we'd use a finer-grained stock", while "as things get more complex, we go to a heavier grain", explained Prieto. Thorough experimentation had been necessary to understand how to achieve the desired effects with color palettes, lighting and wardrobe, and how each of these elements interacted with the bleach bypass process. "We kept making tests, and we arrived at the final scheme through discovery, not design ... We couldn't take anything for granted—we were surprised by the test results every time!" recalled Prieto.

Both Iñárritu and Prieto wanted to accomplish a spontaneous, instinctive, yet transparent camerawork "to create the feeling that the camera was present with the actors, moving, reacting and breathing with them". Handheld camera was always used, even on static shots. Camerawork becomes more unstable and frame composition becomes deliberately unbalanced to reflect the character's life steadiness: "sometimes we wanted to have too much or too little headroom in the frame", explained Prieto. In their most difficult moments, characters are depicted in wide shots and placed in the corners of the frame to appear small and lonely. Prieto refers to these shots as "abandoning angles".

== Title ==
The title references a 1907 experiment that claimed to demonstrate the existence of the soul by measuring a small drop in body weight at the moment of death. Referred to as the 21 grams experiment as one subject lost "three-fourths of an ounce" (21.3 grams), the experiment has been dismissed by the scientific community as flawed and unreliable, though it popularized the idea that a soul might have a measurable weight.

== Reception ==
=== Critical response ===
The film holds an 80% approval rating on Rotten Tomatoes, based on 177 reviews with an average rating of 7.90/10. The critical consensus states that "Alejandro González Iñárritu deftly weaves an uncommonly structured narrative with panache in 21 Grams, a stylish, haunting drama full of fine performances." Metacritic assigned the film a weighted average score of 70 out of 100, based on 41 critics, indicating "generally favorable" reviews.

Roger Ebert, for example, questioned the use of non-linear narrative, but praised the acting and said of the film overall: "It grips us, moves us, astonishes us." Elvis Mitchell also praised the acting and called the film "an extraordinarily satisfying vision" that "may well be the crowning work of this year."

=== Box office ===
The film had a worldwide gross of approximately $60 million on a budget of an estimated $20 million.

=== Accolades ===
Naomi Watts and Benicio del Toro received several awards and nominations for their performances in the film, including Academy Awards and Screen Actors Guild Awards nominations in the categories of Best Actress and Best Supporting Actor. Sean Penn received many dual nominations in the Best Actor category for his roles in both this film and Mystic River.

Award	Category	Recipient(s)	Result	Ref
76th Academy Awards	Best Actress	Naomi Watts	Nominated	
76th Academy Awards	Best Supporting Actor	Benicio del Toro	Nominated	
57th British Academy Film Awards	Best Actor in a Leading Role	Sean Penn	Nominated	
57th British Academy Film Awards	Best Actor in a Leading Role	Benicio del Toro	Nominated	
57th British Academy Film Awards	Best Actress in a Leading Role	Naomi Watts	Nominated	
57th British Academy Film Awards	Best Editing	Stephen Mirrione	Nominated	
57th British Academy Film Awards	Best Original Screenplay	Guillermo Arriaga	Nominated	
Boston Film Critics	Best Actress	Naomi Watts	Nominated	
Chicago Film Critics	Best Actress	Naomi Watts	Nominated	
Chicago Film Critics	Best Supporting Actor	Benicio del Toro	Nominated	
9th Critics' Choice Awards	Best Actress	Naomi Watts	Nominated	
9th Critics' Choice Awards	Best Supporting Actor	Benicio del Toro	Nominated	
Dallas-Fort Worth Film Critics	Best Actress	Naomi Watts	Nominated	
Florida Film Critics Circle Awards 2003	Best Actor	Sean Penn (also for Mystic River)	Won	
Florida Film Critics Circle Awards 2003	Best Actress	Naomi Watts	Won	
19th Independent Spirit Awards	Special Distinction Award	Alejandro González Iñárritu, Guillermo Arriaga, Robert Salerno, Sean Penn, Naomi Watts, Benicio del Toro	Won	
International Cinephile Society Awards	Best Supporting Actor	Benicio del Toro	Won	
Los Angeles Film Critics Association Awards 2003	Best Actor	Sean Penn (also for Mystic River)	Nominated	
Los Angeles Film Critics Association Awards 2003	Best Actress	Naomi Watts	Won	
Los Angeles Film Critics Association Awards 2003	Best Supporting Actor	Benicio del Toro	Nominated	
Los Angeles Film Critics Association Awards 2003	Best Supporting Actress	Melissa Leo	Nominated	
National Board of Review Awards 2003	Top Ten Films		Won	
National Board of Review Awards 2003	Best Actor	Sean Penn (also for Mystic River)	Won	
National Society of Film Critics Awards 2003	Best Actress	Naomi Watts	Nominated	
New York Film Critics	Best Actress	Naomi Watts	Nominated	
Online Film Critics Society Awards 2003	Best Actress	Naomi Watts	Won	
Online Film Critics Society Awards 2003	Best Director	Alejandro González Iñárritu	Nominated	
Online Film Critics Society Awards 2003	Best Original Screenplay	Guillermo Arriaga	Nominated	
Palm Springs International Film Festival	Desert Palm Achievement Award	Naomi Watts	Won	
San Diego Film Critics Society	Best Actress	Naomi Watts	Won	
8th Golden Satellite Awards	Best Actor – Motion Picture Drama	Sean Penn (also for Mystic River)	Won	
8th Golden Satellite Awards	Best Actress – Motion Picture Drama	Naomi Watts	Nominated	
8th Golden Satellite Awards	Best Supporting Actor – Motion Picture	Benicio del Toro	Nominated	
8th Golden Satellite Awards	Best Original Screenplay	Guillermo Arriaga	Nominated	
10th Screen Actors Guild Awards	Outstanding Performance by a Female Actor in a Leading Role	Naomi Watts	Nominated	
10th Screen Actors Guild Awards	Outstanding Performance by a Male Actor in a Supporting Role	Benicio del Toro	Nominated	
Vancouver Film Critics Circle	Best Supporting Actor	Benicio del Toro	Nominated	
60th Venice International Film Festival	Volpi Cup for Best Actor	Sean Penn	Won	
Washington D.C. Area Film Critics Association Awards 2003	Best Actress	Naomi Watts	Won	
Washington D.C. Area Film Critics Association Awards 2003	Best Supporting Actor	Benicio del Toro	Won	
Washington D.C. Area Film Critics Association Awards 2003	Best Original Screenplay	Guillermo Arriaga	Nominated	
World Soundtrack Awards 2003	Discovery of the Year	Gustavo Santaolalla	Won	

== See also ==
- Alejandro González Iñárritu filmography
- Hyperlink cinema – the film style of using multiple inter-connected story lines.
- List of films about mathematicians
