= Amores perros =

2000 Mexican film by Alejandro González Iñárritu

- US release poster
- Directed by: Alejandro González Iñárritu
- Written by: Guillermo Arriaga
- Produced by: Alejandro González Iñárritu
- Starring: Emilio Echevarría; Gael García Bernal; Goya Toledo; Álvaro Guerrero; Vanessa Bauche; Jorge Salinas; Adriana Barraza; Humberto Busto
- Cinematography: Rodrigo Prieto
- Edited by: Alejandro González Iñárritu; Luis Carballar; Fernando Pérez Unda
- Music by: Gustavo Santaolalla
- Production companies: Zeta Entertainment; Alta Vista Films; Estudios Churubusco Azteca
- Distributed by: Nu Vision
- Release dates: 14 May 2000 (Cannes); 16 June 2000 (Mexico)
- Running time: 153 minutes
- Country: Mexico
- Language: Spanish
- Budget: $2.4 million
- Box office: $20.9 million

Amores perros is a 2000 Mexican psychological drama film produced and directed by Alejandro González Iñárritu (in his feature directorial debut) and written by Guillermo Arriaga, based on a story by both. Amores perros is the first installment in González Iñárritu's "Trilogy of Death", succeeded by 21 Grams and Babel. It makes use of the multi-narrative hyperlink cinema style and features an ensemble cast of Emilio Echevarría, Gael García Bernal, Goya Toledo, Álvaro Guerrero, Vanessa Bauche, Jorge Salinas, Adriana Barraza, and Humberto Busto. The film is constructed as a triptych: it contains three distinct stories connected by a car crash in Mexico City. The stories centre on: a teenager in the slums who gets involved in dogfighting; a model who seriously injures her leg; and a mysterious hitman. The stories are linked in various ways, including the presence of dogs in each of them.

The title is a pun in Spanish; the word "perros", which literally means "dogs", can also be used to refer to misery, so that it roughly means 'bad loves' with canine connotations. The film was released under its Spanish title in the English-speaking world, although it was sometimes translated as Love's a Bitch in marketing. The soundtrack includes songs by Latin American rock bands including Café Tacuba, Control Machete, and Illya Kuryaki and the Valderramas.

Amores perros premiered on May 14, 2000 at the 2000 Cannes Film Festival and was released in Mexican theaters on June 16, 2000. Amores perros was a Mexican commercial and critical success and was nominated for the Academy Award for Best Foreign Language Film in 2000 and won the Ariel Award for Best Picture from the Mexican Academy of Film. Amores perros has been considered one of the best Mexican films by many. Filmmaker Denis Villeneuve praised Amores perros as one of the best films of the 21st century.

In December 2020, Amores perros was remastered by The Criterion Collection. In May 2024, a 4K remaster was screened in the Cannes Classics section at the 78th Cannes Film Festival. Streaming service Mubi subsequently acquired worldwide rights to the film, re-releasing the remaster in Mexican theaters on October 9, 2025, followed by a streaming release on October 25.

== Plot ==
The film is constructed from three distinct stories linked by a car crash that brings the characters briefly together.

=== Octavio y Susana ===
Octavio (Gael García Bernal) is in love with Susana (Vanessa Bauche), his abusive brother Ramiro's (Marco Pérez) wife who he has a child with. She confides in Octavio that she is pregnant again, and he tries to persuade her to run away with him, saying he will help raise her children with her. Local thug Jarocho, happy after winning in a dog fight, intends to set his dog loose on some strays but is threatened by a homeless man wielding a machete. Instead, Jarocho sets his dog on Octavio's rottweiler, Cofi, but his own dog is killed. Octavio and his friend Jorge (Humberto Busto), realising Cofi's potential, become involved in the dogfighting scene. Octavio makes enough money to flee with Susana, and pays Mauricio, the owner of the dogfighting venue, to get Ramiro beaten up. Afraid, Ramiro steals the money and leaves with Susana. Struggling financially, Octavio accepts a challenge by Jarocho to participate in a private dogfight, with no outside bets. Cofi is about to win, but Jarocho shoots him. The infuriated Octavio stabs Jarocho in the stomach. Pursued by Jarocho's thugs, Octavio finds himself in a car chase with Jorge and the wounded Cofi. A collision follows; Jorge dies and Octavio is badly injured.

=== Daniel y Valeria ===
Magazine publisher Daniel (Álvaro Guerrero) leaves his family to live with his lover Valeria (Goya Toledo), a Spanish supermodel. On the day they move in together, Valeria's leg is severely broken in Octavio's car crash and she is unable to continue working as a model. As Valeria is recuperating in Daniel's apartment, her dog Richie disappears under a broken floorboard and becomes trapped. The missing dog triggers tension and arguments for the couple, leading to doubts about their relationship on both sides. Trying to rescue the dog, Valeria again injures her leg; Daniel finds her hours later. Valeria's new leg injury results in severe arterial thrombosis and eventually gangrene. Her leg is amputated. While she is in the hospital, Daniel finally rescues Richie from the floorboards. When she returns, Valeria drives her wheelchair through the torn-up lovenest and looks out of the window expecting to see a billboard bearing her likeness, only to find it has been removed.

=== El Chivo y Maru ===
The homeless guy occasionally seen in Octavio's story is revealed to be a professional hitman called El Chivo (Emilio Echevarría). He is a former private school teacher who was imprisoned after committing terrorist acts for guerrilla movements. He is trying to make contact with his daughter, Maru, whom he abandoned when he began his guerrilla involvement and who believes that he is dead. He is about to perform a hit on a businessman when Octavio's car crash interrupts him. During the chaos at the car crash, he steals Octavio's money and takes the wounded Cofi to his warehouse hideout to nurse the dog back to health. One day, while El Chivo is out, Cofi kills all the other mongrel dogs El Chivo is caring for. He is about to kill Cofi, but decides against it. Meanwhile, Octavio's brother Ramiro is shot and killed during an attempted bank robbery.

At Ramiro's funeral, Octavio meets Susana, and again attempts to convince her to run away with him, but she angrily rejects the notion. A few days later, Octavio is shown waiting at the bus station for Susana. She never shows up, and Octavio does not board the bus. El Chivo learns that his client and his intended victim are half-brothers. He leaves both men alive and chained to separate walls with a pistol within reach between them, their fate left uncertain. He then breaks into his daughter Maru's house and leaves her a large bundle of money along with a message on her answering machine explaining what happened to him. When he is about to tell Maru that he loves her, the answering machine stops recording. He then goes to an autoshop, where he sells the client's SUV. The mechanic asks him the dog's name, and El Chivo calls him "Negro" ("Black"). After El Chivo receives the money for the car, he and Negro walk away, disappearing into the horizon.

== Cast ==
- Emilio Echevarría as El Chivo
- Gael García Bernal as Octavio
- Goya Toledo as Valeria
- Álvaro Guerrero as Daniel
- Vanessa Bauche as Susana
- Jorge Salinas as Luis
- Marco Pérez as Ramiro
- Adriana Barraza as Octavio and Ramiro's mother
- Rodrigo Murray as Gustavo
- Gustavo Sánchez Parra as Jarocho
- Humberto Busto as Jorge

== Themes ==
Amores Perros is narratively structured around three intersecting stories, all connected by a car accident and unified through recurring themes of violence, fractured masculinity, and the symbolic presence of dogs.

=== Dogs and dogfighting ===
In Octavio y Susana, dogs were symbolized as masculinity and the desire for control, dominance, and escape. The dog Cofi reflects Octavio’s attempt to assert masculinity through violence and economic power. However, Cofi’s injury reveals how cycles of violence undermine masculine pride.

In Daniel y Valeria, the dog Richie is trapped under the floor, representing Valeria’s helpless situation after surviving a car accident. Richie serves as a metaphor for Valeria’s ability to maintain her previous life and unravel her physical and emotional confinement.

El Chivo y Maru follows El Chivo, who lives with a pack of stray dogs as a hitman. The stray dogs reflect his desire for a stable life with family, while El Chivo himself constantly acts violently in his daily life. As El Chivo adopts Cofi and ultimately leads to the death of other stray dogs, Cofi represents masculinity that causes harm, while other dogs serve as a metaphor of victims under violence.

Dogfighting is banned in all Latin American countries but exists as an element of the underground economy. Although violent, dogfighting provides an opportunity for Octavio to make money. This is true to life in the sense that participating in the underground economy gives people in the lower class the ability to make money and experience mobility. González Iñárritu was heavily criticized for his inclusion of dogfighting in the film but has claimed that although it is horrible, dogfighting is one of the harsh realities of Mexico City.

=== Masculinity ===
Amores Perros presents masculinity as vulnerable, emotionally unstable, a moral failure. In all three stories, almost all of the masculine characters repeatedly fall into violence, abandonment, or isolation. Instead of portraying the traditional male characters of moral perfection, strength, and success, the movie depicts masculinity as a site of danger and failure. In this way, the movie criticizes masculinity by revealing the personal and social costs of performing masculine traits.

=== Inequality ===
The three overlapping stories all take place in Mexico City, but because of class division, there is severe segregation of economic classes with El Chivo squatting on the outskirts of town, Octavio living in a working-class neighborhood, and Valeria living in a luxurious high-rise apartment. If not for the car crash, these three characters would never interact. The upper class is victimized in Amores perros even when they are the ones perpetuating crime. For instance, El Chivo is hired to kill a man's business partner and eventually decides to leave both men to fight it out themselves. Although Ramiro works at a grocery store, he also participates in the underground economy by committing robberies. Octavio and El Chivo participate in the underground economy as well, in order to secure untaxed income and bring stability to their lives.

=== Violence ===
Amores perros contains domestic violence, gun violence, and animal cruelty. The domestic violence is evident in the relationship between Ramiro and his wife, Susana, when Ramiro beats his younger brother Octavio with a metal rod while Octavio takes a shower, as well as in Valeria and Daniel's relationship as they both begin to become verbally and physically aggressive after Valeria becomes depressed. Gun violence is seen from the beginning of the film in a frantic car chase until the very end when El Chivo hands the gun to the two business partners, leaving them to fight their own battle. Lastly, animal cruelty is quite visible in the dog fights Octavio attends in order to make money off of his dog, Cofi. The dog owners show no empathy toward their dogs.

== Production ==
Produced by Zeta Film and AltaVista Films, production began on 12 April 1999.

The DVD of Amores perros has a commentary track, by the director and the screenplay writer. A controversial aspect of the film is the dog fighting sequences. González Iñárritu explains that no dogs were harmed during the making of Amores perros. In the scenes where dogs are apparently attacking each other, they were actually playing. Their muzzles were covered with fine fishing line, so that they were unable to bite another dog. In the shots where dogs are apparently dead or dying, they were sedated (under supervision of the Mexican SPCA). The grittiness of the scenes is amplified by quick cuts and sound effects. Another unusual aspect of the production of Amores perros was the danger to the cast and film crew while filming in the poor parts of Mexico City. The director and some of the crew were actually robbed by street gangs. The Director's cut includes a cameo from the veteran Japanese singer Kazuyo Togawa singing A cappella, credited as "Fat Lady".

== Reception ==
=== Critical response ===
Amores Perros has been widely praised and seen as a representative work of the Nuevo Cine Mexicano, also named as New Mexican Cinema. After its commercial success, Amores perros has also received attention from reviewers and scholars. The film’s portrayal of male characters across different social backgrounds has been discussed in relation to structural violence, social problems, and shifting models of masculinity in post-NAFTA Mexico. Most critics have praised its unique narrative structure and its portrayal of contemporary urban life in Mexico City.

The film was critically acclaimed and received many nominations and awards. Review aggregate Rotten Tomatoes reports that 93% of critics have given the film a positive review based on 122 reviews, with an average score of 8.40/10. The consensus reads "The brutality of Amores Perros may be difficult to watch at times, but this intense, gritty film packs a hard wallop". On Metacritic, it has a score of 83 out of 100 based on 31 critics, indicating "universal acclaim".

=== Awards and nominations ===
- The film won the Prize of the Critic's Week at the 2000 Cannes Film Festival.
- The film won the BAFTA Award for Best Film Not in the English Language and Tokyo Sakura Grand Prix.
- The film won the top award at the 2001 edition of Fantasporto, defeating In the Light of the Moon, Audition and Ringu 0: Birthday.
- The film ranked 4th place for the Best Foreign Film Category at the 2002 Turkish Film Critics Association awards, ahead of cinematic heavyweights such as Cube, Run Lola Run, and Monster's Ball and blockbuster heavyweights such as A Beautiful Mind, A.I. Artificial Intelligence, The Lord of the Rings: The Fellowship of the Ring and Star Wars: Episode II – Attack of the Clones.
- The film won the prestigious Grand Prix of the Belgian Syndicate of Cinema Critics, defeating Yi Yi, The Pledge and Memento.
- The film won the Melhor Filme Estrangeiro Prize at the 2002 Grande Prêmio do Cinema Brasileiro, defeating Moulin Rouge! and Apocalypse Now Redux.
- The film was nominated for the Academy Award for Best Foreign Language Film and Golden Globe Award for Best Foreign Language Film but lost to Crouching Tiger, Hidden Dragon.
- Amores perros also appeared on Empire's 2008 list of the 500 greatest movies of all time where it ranked at number 492.
- It was one of the films voted for the "Readers' Choice" edition of The New York Times' list of "The 100 Best Movies of the 21st Century" in 2025, finishing at number 257.

=== Box office ===
The film opened on 215 screens in Mexico and grossed $1.77 million in its opening week from 664,490 admissions. After four weeks of release, it had grossed 55.9 million pesos ($5.7 million) from 2.2 million admissions.

== Impact ==
Amores perros drew widespread attention to and condemnation of the practice of dog fighting in Mexico. Lead actress Vanessa Bauche has supported animal advocates' anti-dogfighting campaign. Dog fighting was finally outlawed in Mexico on 24 June 2017.

== See also ==
- Alejandro González Iñárritu filmography
- Hyperlink cinema - the film style of using multiple inter-connected story lines.
- Yuva/Aayutha Ezhuthu - Hindi/Tamil films with similar narrative structure.
- List of submissions to the 73rd Academy Awards for Best Foreign Language Film
- List of Mexican submissions for the Academy Award for Best Foreign Language Film
