= Babel (2006 film) =

2006 film by Alejandro González Iñárritu

- Theatrical release poster
- Directed by: Alejandro González Iñárritu
- Written by: Guillermo Arriaga
- Based on: An idea by: Guillermo Arriaga; Alejandro González Iñárritu
- Produced by: Alejandro González Iñárritu; Jon Kilik; Steve Golin
- Starring: Brad Pitt; Cate Blanchett; Gael García Bernal; Koji Yakusho; Adriana Barraza; Rinko Kikuchi
- Cinematography: Rodrigo Prieto
- Edited by: Stephen Mirrione; Douglas Crise
- Music by: Gustavo Santaolalla
- Production companies: Paramount Vantage; Anonymous Content; Zeta Film; Central Films; StudioCanal; Media Rights Capital
- Distributed by: Paramount Pictures (Note: Distribution rights for Babel were split among multiple companies internationally. Paramount pictures handled distribution in English-speaking territories, Spain and Latin America, while StudioCanal handled in France through Mars Distribution, and Summit Entertainment distributed it internationally.)
- Release dates: May 23, 2006 (Cannes); November 10, 2006 (United States and Mexico)
- Running time: 144 minutes
- Countries: Japan; Mexico; United States; France
- Languages: English; Spanish; Arabic; Japanese; Japanese Sign Language; Berber languages
- Budget: $25 million
- Box office: $135.3 million

Babel is a 2006 psychological drama film directed by Alejandro González Iñárritu and written by Guillermo Arriaga. The multi-narrative drama features an ensemble cast and portrays interwoven stories taking place in Morocco, Japan, Mexico, and the United States. An international co-production among companies based in Japan, Mexico, the United States and France, the film completes Arriaga and Iñárritu's Death Trilogy, following Amores perros (2000) and 21 Grams (2003).

Babel was selected to compete for the Palme d'Or at the 2006 Cannes Film Festival, where González Iñárritu won the Best Director Award. The film was later screened at the Toronto International Film Festival. It opened in selected cities in the United States on 27 October 2006, and went into wide release on 10 November 2006. Babel received positive reviews and was a financial success, grossing $135 million worldwide. It won the Golden Globe Award for Best Motion Picture – Drama, and received seven Academy Award nominations, including Best Picture, Best Director, and two nominations for Best Supporting Actress (Adriana Barraza and Rinko Kikuchi). It won the award for Best Original Score (Gustavo Santaolalla).

== Plot ==
Babel contains four main storylines with seemingly unconnected characters. The stories are not told in linear or chronological order. As the movie unfolds, the audience learns how the plots are intertwined.

=== Morocco ===
In a desert in Morocco, Abdullah, a goatherder, buys a gun from his neighbor to shoot the jackals that have been preying on his goats. Abdullah gives the rifle to his two young sons, Yussef and Ahmed, and sends them out to tend to the herd. Doubtful of the rifle's purported range, the two decide to test it out, aiming at rocks and highway traffic. Yussef manages to hit a bus, critically wounding an American woman who is traveling with her husband on vacation. The two boys flee the scene and hide the rifle in the hills.

Glimpses of TV news programs reveal that the US government considers the shooting a terrorist act and is pressuring the Moroccan government to apprehend the culprits. Abdullah, who has heard about the shooting, asks the boys where the rifle is and beats the truth out of them. Finally, the three try to flee but are spotted. The police corner the father and boys on the rocky slope of a hill and open fire. After Ahmed is hit in the leg, Yussef returns fire, striking one police officer in the shoulder. The police continue shooting, hitting Ahmed in the back, severely injuring him. Yussef then surrenders, admitting responsibility for shooting the American and asking for medical assistance; the police are shocked to realize they were shooting at children.

=== Richard/Susan ===
Richard and Susan are an American couple who came on vacation to Morocco. Their infant son Sam recently died of SIDS, putting a strain on their relationship. When Susan is shot on a tour bus, Richard orders the bus driver to the nearest village, Tazzarine. The other tourists wait for some time, but they eventually demand to leave, fearing the heat and fearing they may be targets of further attacks. Richard tells the tour group to wait for the ambulance, which never arrives, and eventually the bus leaves without them. The couple stays behind with the bus's tour guide, still waiting for transport to a hospital. A helicopter arrives and carries Richard and Susan to a hospital in Casablanca, where she is expected to recover.

=== United States/Mexico ===
Richard and Susan's Mexican nanny, Amelia, tends to their children, Debbie and Mike, in their San Diego home. When Amelia learns of Susan's injury, she worries that she will miss her son's wedding. Unable to secure any other help, she calls Richard, who tells her to stay with the children. Without his permission, Amelia decides to take them with her to the wedding in a rural community near Tijuana. Rather than staying the night at the party, Amelia drives back to the USA with her nephew, Santiago. He has been drinking heavily, and the border guards become suspicious of him and the American children in the car. Amelia has passports for all of them, but no letter of consent from the children's parents allowing her to take them out of the USA. Under pressure, Santiago speeds away in a drunken panic and abandons Amelia and the children in the desert, whereupon awakening in the morning, they soon begin to suffer from heat exhaustion.

Amelia leaves the children behind to find help, ordering them not to move. She eventually finds a Border Patrol officer, who places her under arrest. They travel back to where she left the children, but they are not there. Amelia is taken back to a Border Patrol station, where she is eventually informed that the children have been found and that Richard, while outraged, has agreed not to press charges. However, she will be deported from the USA, where she has been working illegally. At the border, a tearful Amelia is greeted by her newlywed son.

=== Japan ===
Chieko Wataya (Japanese: 綿谷 千恵子, romanized: Wataya Chieko) is a rebellious, deaf, nonverbal teenage girl. She is also self-conscious and unhappy because of her deafness. While out with friends, she finds a teenage boy attractive and, after an unsuccessful attempt at socializing, exposes herself to him under the table. At a dental appointment, she tries to kiss the dentist, who sends her away. Chieko encounters two police detectives who question her about her father, Yasujiro. She invites one of the detectives, Kenji Mamiya (真宮 賢治, Mamiya Kenji), back to the high-rise apartment that she shares with her father. Incorrectly assuming that the detectives are investigating her father's involvement in her mother's suicide, she explains to Mamiya that her father was asleep when her mother jumped off the balcony and that she witnessed this herself. The detectives are actually investigating a hunting trip Yasujiro took in Morocco. Soon after learning this, Chieko approaches Mamiya nude and attempts to seduce him. Disgusted, he resists her approaches but comforts her as she bursts into tears.

Leaving the apartment, Mamiya crosses paths with Yasujiro and questions him about the rifle. Yasujiro explains that there was no black-market involvement; he gave his rifle as a gift to Hassan, his hunting guide, on a trip to Morocco. About to depart, Mamiya offers condolences for the wife's suicide. Yasujiro, however, is confused by the mention of a balcony and angrily replies that his wife shot herself, and that Chieko was the first to discover her. As Mamiya sits in a restaurant, watching news of Susan's recovery, Yasujiro comforts his daughter with a hug as she stands on their balcony in mourning.

== Themes ==
Babel can be analyzed as a network narrative in which its characters, scattered across the globe, represent different nodes of a network that is connected by various strands.

One of the central connections between all of the main characters is the rifle. Over the course of the movie, the viewer finds out that Yasujiro Wataya visits Morocco for a hunting trip and gives the rifle as a gift to his guide, Hassan Ibrahim, who then sells it to Abdullah from where it gets passed on to his sons. Susan Jones, in turn, is shot with that very same rifle which also has a tragic impact on Amelia Hernández's life. It is observable that "all characters are affected by the connections created between them – connections that influence both their individual trajectories as characters and the overall structure of the plot".

It shows how a single object can serve as a connection between many different characters (or nodes in a network) who do not necessarily need to know each other. Even though the rifle is not passed on any further, it continues to influence the characters' lives in significant ways. This demonstrates how the smallest actions on one side of the world can ultimately lead to a complete change of another person's life elsewhere, without there being any form of direct contact between the two (also see Butterfly effect). It also creates a small-world effect, in which "characters will intersect again and again" either directly or indirectly and mostly by accident. As Maria Poulaki observes, characters in network narratives "meet and separate not because of the characters' purposeful actions but as an outcome of pure chance".

== Cast ==
Morocco

- Brad Pitt as Richard Jones
- Cate Blanchett as Susan Jones
- Mohamed Akhzam as Anwar
- Peter Wight as Tom
- Harriet Walter as Lilly
- Michael Maloney as James
- Driss Roukhe as Alarid
- Boubker Ait El Caid as Yussef
- Said Tarchani as Ahmed
- Mustapha Rachidi as Abdullah
- Abdelkader Bara as Hassan
- Wahiba Sahmi as Zohra
- Robert Fyfe as Tourist Number 14

United States/Mexico

- Adriana Barraza as Amelia Hernández
- Gael García Bernal as Santiago
- Elle Fanning as Debbie Jones
- Nathan Gamble as Mike Jones
- Clifton Collins Jr. as Police Officer at Mexican border
- Michael Peña as Officer John

Japan

- Rinko Kikuchi as Chieko Wataya
- Koji Yakusho as Yasujiro Wataya
- Satoshi Nikaido as Detective Kenji Mamiya
- Yuko Murata as Mitsu
- Shigemitsu Ogi as Dentist Chieko attempts to seduce.
- Ayaka Komatsu as Bikini Model in TV Commercial (uncredited)

== Production ==
=== Writing ===
In one of the earlier drafts of the script written by Guillermo Arriaga, the Japanese deaf girl was originally a Spanish girl who had recently become blind.

Earlier, the leading couple's problems were infidelities, but a child death was introduced to allow Pitt to better understand his character.

According to Alejandro González Iñárritu, the locations of the film played a key role in his life. He made a life changing trip to Morocco at 17. In his previous travels to Japan, he was convinced to return with a camera someday, and finally his own move from Mexico to the United States was also present in the film.

Asked about the idea for the film, which is credited to Arriaga and González Iñárritu, the former said, "It is credited to him because I had this story first placed only in two countries. He asked to have it in four and that's why he has the 'idea by' credit." Asked also if the idea of setting Babel's two other stories in Morocco and Japan was from González Iñárritu, Arriaga answered "No, he said put it wherever you want".

=== Casting ===
When the then 23-year-old (24 when the actual filming began) Rinko Kikuchi auditioned, in July 2004, for the role of Chieko, Iñárritu was surprised by her talent but was reluctant due to her not being deaf. The casting process continued with hundred of actresses in the following nine months, with Kikuchi ultimately winning the role in April 2005, a week before filming began.

At the volleyball match in Tokyo, most of the audience spectators were played by deaf people.

Brad Pitt backed out of a role in The Departed, which he produced, in order to film Babel.

The film extras portraying migrants in the Mexico shooting were real immigrants hired by the production company.

=== Funding ===
Babel's $25 million budget came from an array of different sources and investors anchored with Paramount Vantage.

=== Shooting ===
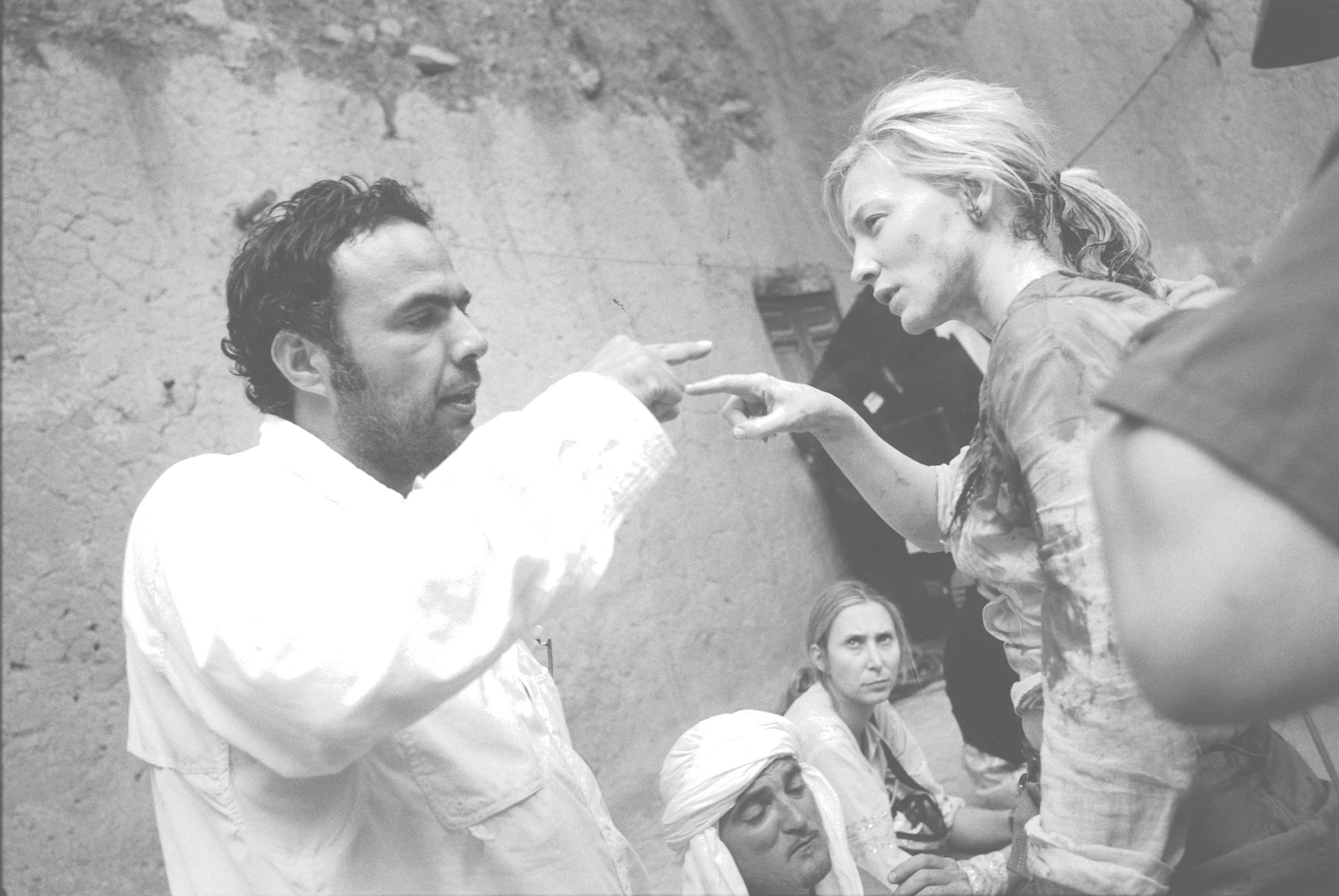
Alejandro González Iñárritu and Cate Blanchett during filming

Filming locations included Ibaraki and Tokyo in Japan, Mexico (El Carrizo, Sonora, and Tijuana), Morocco (Ouarzazate and Taguenzalt – a Berber village in the foothills of the Atlas Mountains, built into the rocky gorges of the Draa's valley), the US state of California (San Diego), and Drumheller in the Canadian province of Alberta.

Principal photography began using 16mm film on May 2, 2005 and wrapped on December 1, 2005. Several different types of film stock, including three-perf Super 35mm, 35mm, 18.5 anamorphic, were later utilized to give each location a distinct look. After filming, director Alejandro González Iñárritu and screenwriter Guillermo Arriaga had a falling-out regarding the authorship of their previous film, 21 Grams. Arriaga argued that cinema is a collaborative medium, and that both he and González Iñárritu are thus the authors of the films they have worked on together. González Iñárritu claimed sole credit as the auteur of those same films, minimizing Arriaga's contribution to the pictures. Following this dispute, Iñárritu banned Arriaga from attending the 2006 Cannes Film Festival screening of Babel, an act for which the director was criticized.

=== Music ===
The film's original score and songs were composed and produced by Gustavo Santaolalla. The closing scene of the film features "Bibo no Aozora" by award-winning composer Ryuichi Sakamoto. The musical score won the Academy Award for Best Original Score and the BAFTA Award for Best Film Music. It was also nominated for the Golden Globe Award for Best Original Score.

== Release ==
Babel was selected to compete for the Palme d'Or at the 2006 Cannes Film Festival. It was later screened at the Toronto International Film Festival. It opened in selected cities in the United States on 27 October 2006, and went into wide release on 10 November 2006. When the film was released in Japan in 2007, several moviegoers reported queasiness during a scene in which Rinko Kikuchi's character visits a nightclub filled with strobe lights and flashing colors. In response, distributors administered a health warning describing the scene.

=== Home media ===
On 20 February and 21 May 2007, Babel was released on DVD by Paramount Home Entertainment in the United States and the United Kingdom respectively. On 25 September 2007, Paramount re-released the film as a two-disc special edition DVD. The second disc contains a 90-minute 'making of' documentary titled Common Ground: Under Construction Notes. Babel has also been released on the high-definition formats, HD DVD, and Blu-ray Disc.

On its first week of release on DVD in North America (19–25 February 2007), Babel debuted #1 in DVD/Home Video Rentals. Total gross rentals for the week, were estimated at $8.73 million. In the first week of DVD sales, Babel sold 721,000 units, gathering revenue of $12.3 million. By April 2007, 1,650,000 units had been sold, translating to $28.6 million in revenue. In July 2008, its US DVD sales had totaled $31.4 million.

== Reception ==
=== Box office ===
Released in seven theaters on 27 October 2006, and then released nationwide in 1,251 theaters on 10 November 2006, Babel grossed $34.3 million in North America, and $101 million in the rest of the world, for a worldwide box office total of $135.3 million, against a budget of $25 million. Babel is the highest-grossing film of González Iñárritu's Death Trilogy (including Amores perros and 21 Grams), both in North America and worldwide.

=== Critical response ===
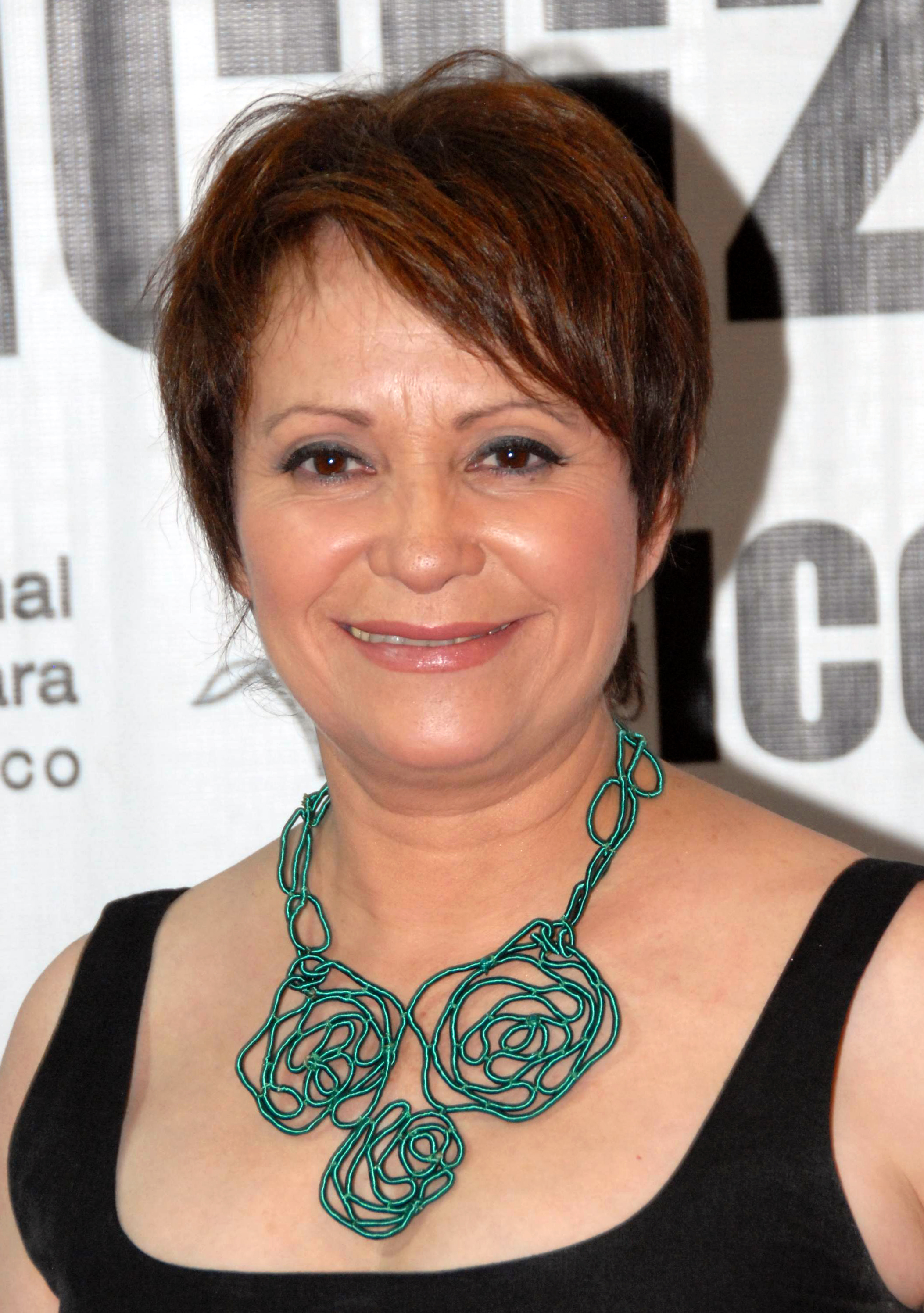
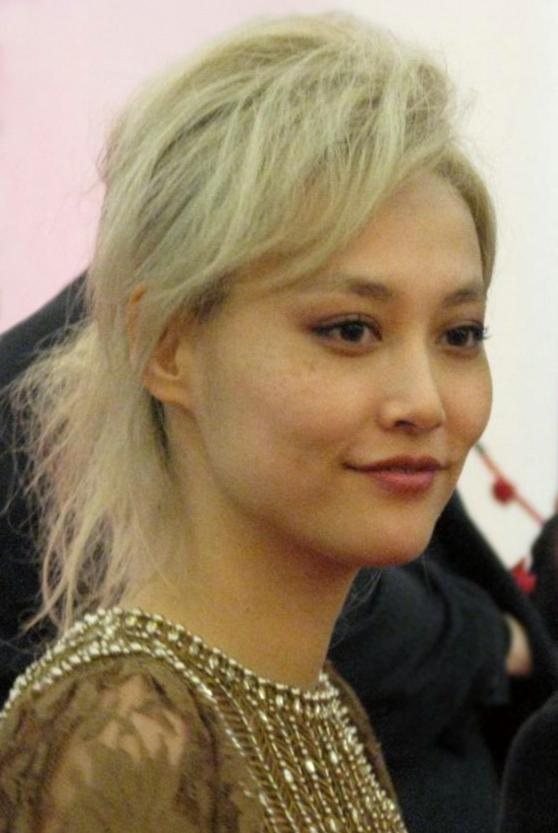
Adriana Barraza and Rinko Kikuchi garnered critical acclaim for their performances and both earned Academy Award nominations for Best Supporting Actress.

Babel received generally positive reviews. Review aggregation website Rotten Tomatoes gives the film an approval rating of 68% based on 203 reviews, with an average rating of 7.10/10, making the film a "Fresh" on the website's rating system. The critical consensus states that "In Babel, there are no villains, only victims of fate and circumstance. Director Alejandro González Iñárritu weaves four of their woeful stories into this mature and multidimensional film." At Metacritic, the film received a weighted average score of 69/100, based on 38 reviews, which indicates "generally favorable" reviews. Audiences polled by CinemaScore gave the film an average grade of "B-" on an A+ to F scale.

Film critic Roger Ebert included Babel in his The Great Movies list, stating that the film "finds Iñárritu in full command of his technique: The writing and editing moves between the stories with full logical and emotional clarity, and the film builds to a stunning impact because it does not hammer us with heroes and villains but asks us to empathize with all of its characters."

=== Top ten lists ===
The film appeared on many critics' top ten lists of the best films of 2006.

- 1st – Stephen Holden, The New York Times
- 1st – Marc Savlov, The Austin Chronicle
- 1st – Ray Bennett, The Hollywood Reporter
- 3rd – James Berardinelli, ReelViews
- 3rd – Michael Rechtshaffen, The Hollywood Reporter
- 4th – Jack Mathews, Daily News
- 4th – Frank Scheck, The Hollywood Reporter
- 5th – Peter Travers, Rolling Stone
- 5th – Lou Lumenick, New York Post
- 7th – Michael Wilmington, Chicago Tribune
- 8th – Claudia Puig, USA Today
- 9th – Kevin Crust, Los Angeles Times
- 9th – Tasha Robinson, The A.V. Club
- 9th – Roger Ebert, Chicago Sun-Times
- Top 10 (listed alphabetically) – Dana Stevens, Slate Magazine
- Top 10 (listed alphabetically) – Ruthie Stein, San Francisco Chronicle
- Top 10 (listed alphabetically) – Steven Rea, Philadelphia Inquirer

== Accolades ==
Award	Category	Recipient	Result
Academy Awards	Best Picture	Alejandro González Iñárritu, Jon Kilik, Steve Golin	Nominated
Academy Awards	Best Director	Alejandro González Iñárritu	Nominated
Academy Awards	Best Supporting Actress	Adriana Barraza	Nominated
Academy Awards	Best Supporting Actress	Rinko Kikuchi	Nominated
Academy Awards	Best Original Screenplay	Guillermo Arriaga	Nominated
Academy Awards	Best Film Editing	Douglas Crise and Stephen Mirrione	Nominated
Academy Awards	Best Original Score	Gustavo Santaolalla	Won
Austin Film Critics	Best Supporting Actress	Rinko Kikuchi	Won
BAFTA Film Awards	Best Film	Babel	Nominated
BAFTA Film Awards	Best Director	Alejandro González Iñárritu	Nominated
BAFTA Film Awards	Best Original Screenplay	Guillermo Arriaga	Nominated
BAFTA Film Awards	Best Cinematography	Rodrigo Prieto	Nominated
BAFTA Film Awards	Best Editing	Douglas Crise and Stephen Mirrione	Nominated
BAFTA Film Awards	Best Sound		Nominated
BAFTA Film Awards	Best Film Music	Gustavo Santaolalla	Won
Broadcast Film Critics	Best Picture	Babel	Nominated
Broadcast Film Critics	Best Ensemble	Babel	Nominated
Broadcast Film Critics	Best Screenplay	Guillermo Arriaga	Nominated
Broadcast Film Critics	Best Supporting Actress	Adriana Barraza	Nominated
Broadcast Film Critics	Best Supporting Actress	Rinko Kikuchi	Nominated
Broadcast Film Critics	Best Score	Gustavo Santaolalla	Nominated
Broadcast Film Critics	Best Soundtrack		Nominated
Cannes Film Festival	Best Director	Alejandro González Iñárritu	Won
Cannes Film Festival	François Chalais Award (a Prize of the Ecumenical Jury)		Won
Cannes Film Festival	Technical Grand Prize	Stephen Mirrione (for editing)	Won
Cannes Film Festival	Palme d'Or (Best Film)	Babel	Nominated
César Awards	Best Foreign Film	Alejandro González Iñárritu	Nominated
Chicago Film Critics	Best Film	Babel	Nominated
Chicago Film Critics	Best Director	Alejandro González Iñárritu	Nominated
Chicago Film Critics	Best Original Screenplay	Guillermo Arriaga	Nominated
Chicago Film Critics	Best Supporting Actor	Brad Pitt	Nominated
Chicago Film Critics	Best Supporting Actress	Adriana Barraza	Nominated
Chicago Film Critics	Best Supporting Actress	Rinko Kikuchi	Won
Chicago Film Critics	Best Promising Performer	Rinko Kikuchi	Nominated
Chicago Film Critics	Best Cinematography	Rodrigo Prieto	Nominated
Chicago Film Critics	Best Original Score	Gustavo Santaolalla	Nominated
David di Donatello Awards	Best Foreign Film	Alejandro González Iñárritu	Won
Directors Guild of America	Outstanding Directorial Achievement	Alejandro González Iñárritu	Nominated
Golden Eagle Award	Best Foreign Language Film	Babel	Nominated
Golden Globe Awards	Best Motion Picture – Drama	Babel	Won
Golden Globe Awards	Best Director	Alejandro González Iñárritu	Nominated
Golden Globe Awards	Best Screenplay	Guillermo Arriaga	Nominated
Golden Globe Awards	Best Supporting Actor	Brad Pitt	Nominated
Golden Globe Awards	Best Supporting Actress	Adriana Barraza	Nominated
Golden Globe Awards	Best Supporting Actress	Rinko Kikuchi	Nominated
Golden Globe Awards	Best Original Score	Gustavo Santaolalla	Nominated
Image Awards	Outstanding Directing in a Film/TV Movie	Alejandro González Iñárritu	Nominated
Motion Picture Sound Editors Awards	Best Sound Editing for Music - Feature Film		Nominated
Motion Picture Sound Editors Awards	Best Sound Editing for Sound Effects and Foley - Foreign Film		Nominated
National Board of Review	Best Breakthrough Actress	Rinko Kikuchi	Won
Online Film Critics	Best Picture	Babel	Nominated
Online Film Critics	Best Director	Alejandro González Iñárritu	Nominated
Online Film Critics	Best Supporting Actress	Adriana Barraza	Nominated
Online Film Critics	Best Supporting Actress	Rinko Kikuchi	Nominated
Online Film Critics	Best Breakthrough Performance	Rinko Kikuchi	Nominated
Online Film Critics	Best Cinematography	Rodrigo Prieto	Nominated
Online Film Critics	Best Editing	Douglas Crise and Stephen Mirrione	Nominated
Online Film Critics	Best Original Score	Gustavo Santaolalla	Nominated
Online Film Critics	Best Original Screenplay	Guillermo Arriaga	Nominated
Producers Guild of America	Motion Picture Producer of the Year	Alejandro González Iñárritu; Steve Golin; Jon Kilik	Nominated
San Diego Film Critics	Best Ensemble	Babel	Won
San Diego Film Critics	Best Score	Gustavo Santaolalla	Won
San Francisco Film Critics	Best Supporting Actress	Adriana Barraza	Won
Satellite Awards	Best Film - Drama	Babel	Nominated
Satellite Awards	Best Director	Alejandro González Iñárritu	Nominated
Satellite Awards	Best Original Screenplay	Guillermo Arriaga; Alejandro González Iñárritu	Nominated
Satellite Awards	Best Supporting Actor	Brad Pitt	Nominated
Satellite Awards	Best Supporting Actress	Rinko Kikuchi	Nominated
Satellite Awards	Best Editing	Douglas Crise and Stephen Mirrione	Nominated
Satellite Awards	Best Sound		Nominated
Satellite Awards	Best Original Score	Gustavo Santaolalla	Won
Screen Actors Guild	Best Cast	Babel	Nominated
Screen Actors Guild	Best Supporting Actress	Adriana Barraza	Nominated
Screen Actors Guild	Best Supporting Actress	Rinko Kikuchi	Nominated
Writers Guild of America	Best Original Screenplay	Guillermo Arriaga	Nominated
Young Artist Award	Best Performance in a Feature Film - Young Actor Age Ten or Younger	Nathan Gamble	Nominated
Young Artist Award	Best Performance in a Feature Film - Young Actress Age Ten or Younger	Elle Fanning	Nominated

== See also ==
- Alejandro González Iñárritu filmography
- Hyperlink cinema – the film style of using multiple inter-connected story lines
- List of films featuring the deaf and hard of hearing
- Winchester '73— a Western narrative also following a rifle
