= Douglas Crise =

American film editor

- Born: Douglas Alan Crise; May 1, 1961 (age 65); Smithton, Pennsylvania
- Occupation: Film editor
- Years active: 1993 – present

Douglas Crise is an American film editor.

== Biography ==
Douglas Crise was born May 1, 1961, to Glenn Crise, a retired mail carrier, and Catherine, a homemaker. The middle child of the family, Crise grew up in Smithton, Pennsylvania. In 1979, Crise graduated from Yough High School and soon began to work as a meat cutter at Shop 'n Save in Mount Pleasant, Pennsylvania. Crise graduated from the University of Pittsburgh with a degree in film studies and moved to Los Angeles to find work in the film industry, working for a little while as a movie lot truck driver. After a short stay in Los Angeles, Crise returned to Pittsburgh for a year before returning to California to work as a film editor. For months, Crise worked as an unpaid intern, apprentice, and assistant editor for very little money. Crise eventually worked his way up the film industry working as an assistant editor. In 1997, Crise worked as an assistant editor on the film Clockwatchers, with lead editor, Stephen Mirrione. This was the beginning of what would be a long-lasting collaboration between Crise and Mirrione. Eventually, Crise and Mirrione collaborated as co-editors on Alejandro González Iñárritu's 2006 film, Babel. For their work on the film, Crise and Mirrione received a nomination for the Academy Award for Best Film Editing, the BAFTA Award for Best Editing, the Online Film Critics Society Award for Best Editing, and the Satellite Award for Best Editing. In addition to this, Crise and Mirrione won the 2007 ACE Eddie Award for Best Edited Feature Film – Dramatic tying with Thelma Schoonmaker for The Departed, making it only the second tie in ACE Eddie Award history.

== Filmography ==
Year	Film	Director	Other notes
1993	Percy & Thunder	Ivan Dixon	Television film second assistant editor
1993	Return of the Living Dead 3	Brian Yuzna	assistant editor
1993	Necronomicon	Brian Yuzna; Christophe Gans; Shusuke Kaneko	first assistant editor
1994	Leprechaun 2	Rodman Flender	assistant editor
1995	Kicking and Screaming	Noah Baumbach	first assistant editor
1996	Livers Ain't Cheap	James Merendino	first assistant editor
1996	Barb Wire	David Hogan	assistant film editor
1997	Clockwatchers	Jill Sprecher	first assistant editor
1998	The Wonderful Ice Cream Suit	Stuart Gordon	assistant film editor
1998	Gunshy	Jeff Celentano	assistant editor
1998	Progeny	Brian Yuzna	additional assistant editor
1998	A Cool, Dry Place	John N. Smith	assistant editor
1999	Go	Doug Liman	first assistant editor
2000	Traffic	Steven Soderbergh	first assistant editor
2001	Ocean's Eleven	Steven Soderbergh	first assistant editor
2002	Highway	James Cox	first assistant editor
2002	Confessions of a Dangerous Mind	George Clooney	first assistant editor
2003	21 Grams	Alejandro González Iñárritu	assistant editor
2004	Ocean's Twelve	Steven Soderbergh	assistant editor
2004	Criminal	Gregory Jacobs	
2005	Good Night, and Good Luck	George Clooney	first assistant editor
2006	Babel	Alejandro González Iñárritu	Nominated – Academy Award for Best Film Editing with Stephen Mirrione
2007	The Nines	John August	
2008	Deception	Marcel Langenegger	
2008	Lovely, Still	Nicholas Fackler	
2009	Breaking Point	Jeff Celentano	
2010	Trust	David Schwimmer	
2011	Kill the Irishman	Jonathan Hensleigh	
2012	Arbitrage	Nicholas Jarecki	
2012	Spring Breakers	Harmony Korine	
2013	Decoding Annie Parker	Steven Bernstein	
2014	Cesar Chavez	Diego Luna	
2014	Birdman	Alejandro González Iñárritu	
2015	Dark Places	Gilles Paquet-Brenner	
2016	Mr. Pig	Diego Luna	
2016	Gold	Stephen Gaghan	
2016	Deserted	Ashley Avis	
2017	Mark Felt: The Man Who Brought Down the White House	Peter Landesman	special thanks
2018	Adolescence	Ashley Avis	
2018	Zoe	Drake Doremus	
2018	London Fields	Mathew Cullen	
2019	The Beach Bum	Harmony Korine	
2021	The Survivor	Barry Levinson	
2023	The Hill	Jeff Celentano	
2024	Blackwater Lane	Jeff Celentano	
TBA	Eleven Days	Peter Landesman	Post-production
