= Werc Werk Works =

Film production and finance company

- Company type: Independent Film Production and Finance
- Industry: Motion pictures
- Founded: 2008
- Headquarters: Minneapolis, United States
- Key people: Elizabeth Redleaf, CEO; Christine Kunewa Walker, President
- Website: WercWerkWorks.com

Werc Werk Works is an independent film production and finance company founded by Elizabeth Redleaf and Independent Spirit Award-nominated producer Christine Kunewa Walker. The company plans to make three to four films per year in the sub-$5 million range.

== Films ==
Life During Wartime, written and directed by Todd Solondz, premiered at the Venice Film Festival in 2009 where it won the Golden Osella award for best screenplay. It was released in Europe in spring of 2010 and in July by IFC Films, and stars Shirley Henderson, Ciarán Hinds, Allison Janney, Michael Lerner, Chris Marquette, Rich Pecci, Charlotte Rampling, Paul Reubens, Ally Sheedy, Dylan Riley Snyder, Renée Taylor, and Michael Kenneth Williams.

Howl, starring James Franco, had its world premiere as the opening night film of the 2010 Sundance Film Festival and went on to be in competition at the 2010 Berlinale. The film was written and directed by Rob Epstein and Jeffery Friedman and features James Franco, David Strathairn, Jon Hamm, Bob Balaban, Alessandro Nivola, Treat Williams, Mary-Louise Parker, and Jeff Daniels. Howl was released in September 2010 by Oscilloscope Labs.

The Convincer, a midwestern crime drama, was filmed in Spring of 2010 and had its world premiere at the 2011 Sundance Film Festival. The feature is written by Jill Sprecher and Karen Sprecher and directed by Jill Sprecher. The film stars Greg Kinnear, Alan Arkin, Michelle Arthur, Bob Balaban, Billy Crudup, David Harbour, and Lea Thompson.

The Turin Horse, an international co-production is written and directed by celebrated Hungarian filmmaker Béla Tarr. The Turin Horse is about German philosopher Friedrich Nietzsche and stars acclaimed international actors Miroslav Krobot, Erika Bolk, and Volker Spengler. The script was co-written by László Krasznahorkai. The premiered at the 2011 Berlin Film Festival and won the Jury Grand Prix Silver Bear and the Competition FIPRESCI Prize.

Darling Companion, completed filming in Utah in December 2010 and is currently in post-production. Written by Lawrence Kasdan and Meg Kasdan, Darling Companion tells the story of a woman who loves her dog more than her husband. And then her husband loses the dog. The film is directed by Lawrence Kasdan and stars Diane Keaton, Kevin Kline, Dianne Wiest, Richard Jenkins, Elisabeth Moss, Sam Shepard, Mark Duplass, and Ayelet Zurer.
