= San Diego Film Critics Society Awards 2003 =

Annual US film awards ceremony

8th SDFCS Awards

December 18, 2003

Best Film:
Dirty Pretty Things

The 8th San Diego Film Critics Society Awards, given by the San Diego Film Critics Society on 18 December 2003, honored the best in film for 2003.

== Winners ==
- Best Actor:
  - Chiwetel Ejiofor – Dirty Pretty Things
- Best Actress
  - Naomi Watts – 21 Grams
- Best Animated Film:
  - The Triplets of Belleville (Les triplettes de Belleville)
- Best Cinematography:
  - Girl with a Pearl Earring – Eduardo Serra
- Best Director:
  - Peter Jackson – The Lord of the Rings: The Return of the King
- Best Documentary Film:
  - Rivers and Tides
- Best Editing
  - Kill Bill: Volume 1 – Sally Menke
- Best Film:
  - Dirty Pretty Things
- Best Foreign Language Film (tie):
  - The Barbarian Invasions (Les invasions barbares) • Canada/France
  - Irreversible (Irréversible) • France
- Best Production Design:
  - The Lord of the Rings: The Return of the King – Grant Major
- Best Adapted Screenplay:
  - American Splendor – Shari Springer Berman and Robert Pulcini
- Best Original Screenplay:
  - The Magdalene Sisters – Peter Mullan
- Best Supporting Actor:
  - Djimon Hounsou – In America
- Best Supporting Actress:
  - Renée Zellweger – Cold Mountain
