= Winter Ave Zoli =

American actress and model

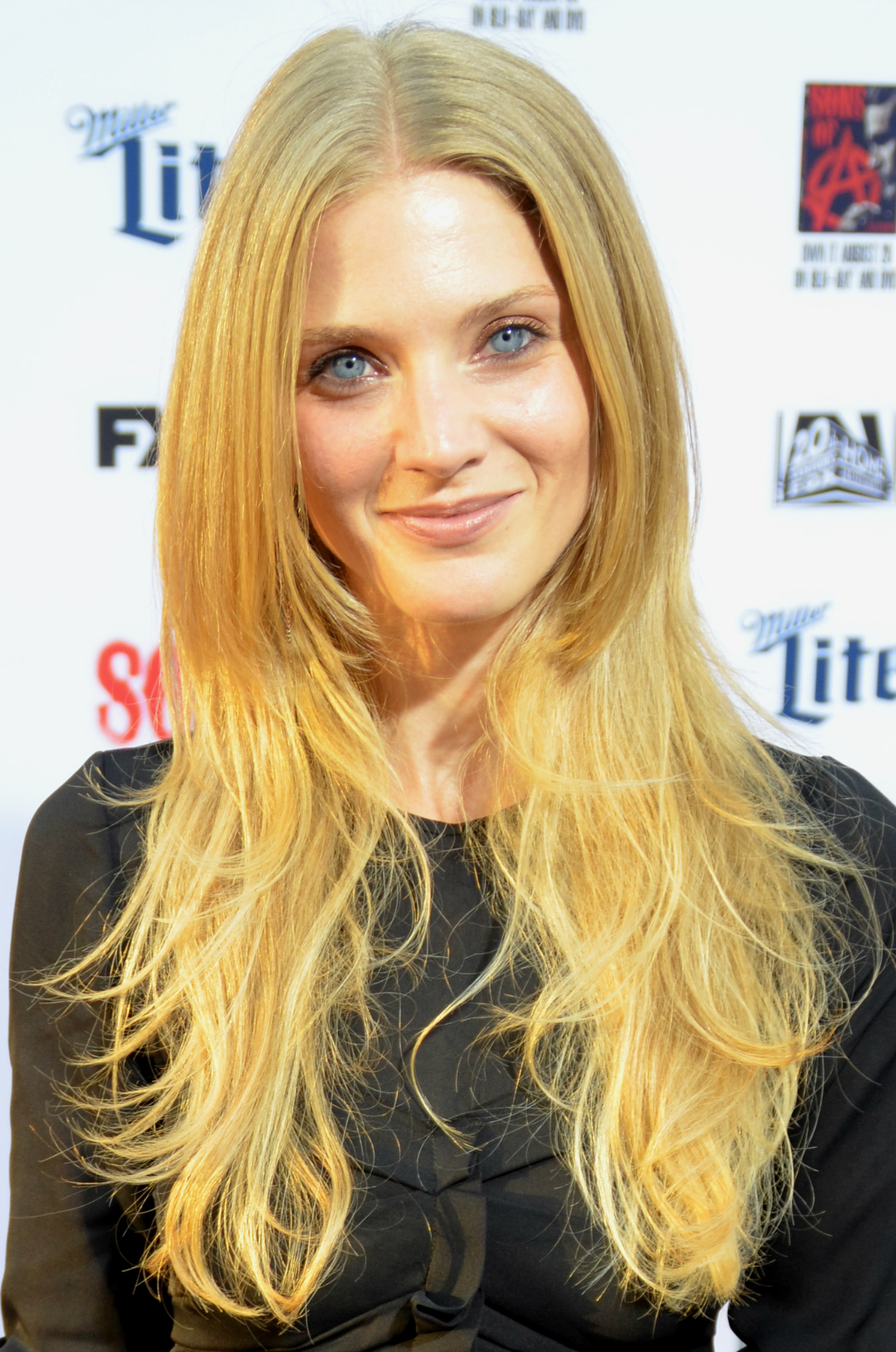
- Zoli at the Sons of Anarchy FX Premiere in September 2014
- Born: <1980> New Hope, PA
- Occupations: Actress; model
- Years active: 1993–present
- Spouse: Csaba Lucas (m. 2015)
- Modeling information
- Height: 1.70 m (5 ft 7 in)
- Hair color: Blonde
- Eye color: Blue

Winter Ave Zoli is an American actress and model. She is best known for her role as Lyla Winston in FX's TV series Sons of Anarchy, Amy Snyder in Bosch (2017–2018), and for Deserted (2016). Zoli also appears in Agents of S.H.I.E.L.D. (2015) and Code Black (2017).

== Early life ==
Zoli grew up in New Hope, Pennsylvania, where her parents worked in fashion. At age 11, she moved with her family to Czechoslovakia, where she attended middle and high school.

Zoli studied acting at the Atlantic Theater Company acting school in New York City, founded by playwright David Mamet and actor William H. Macy.

== Career ==
After graduating from the professional program, Winter moved to Los Angeles. She appeared in the 2007 film Sex and Death 101 as Alexis, the fast food beauty. She held the main role of legendary Libuše in the 2009 Czech film The Pagan Queen, where she co-starred with her future husband, Hungarian actor Csaba Lucas. Winter gained further international recognition with her main role as Lyla Winston on the hit American TV series Sons of Anarchy. She posed nude in Playboy magazine's March 2011 edition, commenting that "nudity is not a problem for [her]."

In 2016, Winter starred in the feature film Deserted opposite Mischa Barton, Jackson Davis, Trent Ford, Dana Rosendorff, Lance Henriksen, Jake Busey and Gerry Bednob. The film is a psychological thriller about a group of friends on a road trip to a music festival in "Death Valley – which results in getting them hopelessly lost in the most stunning, but unforgiving, topographical terrain on the planet".

== Filmography ==
=== Film ===
Year	Title	Role	Notes
1999	Flawless	Tasha	
2003	The League of Extraordinary Gentlemen	Eva	
2007	Trust Me	Lolly	
2007	Sex and Death 101	Alexis De Large (#37)	
2008	Fold	Rachel	Short
2008	Maestro	Ariane	Short
2008	Reservations	Marketa	
2009	The Pagan Queen	Libuse	
2010	Psych:9	Emma	
2011	Prodigal	Angela O'Neil	Short
2012	Bad Ass	Tatiana	
2014	Cat Run 2	Tatiana	Video
2016	Deserted	Rosemary	
2016	Spaceman	Mrs. Lee	
2020	Superman: Red Son	Svetlana (voice)	Video
2022	Father Stu	Allison	
2022	Savage Salvation	Darlene	

=== Television ===
Year	Title	Role	Notes
1999	The Scarlet Pimpernel	Cecile	"A King's Ransom"
2004	Wuthering Heights	Isabella Linton	TV film
2005	Revelations	Anna-Theresa	TV miniseries
2009	The Philanthropist	Ivana Kleiner	"Paris"
2009–2014	Sons of Anarchy	Lyla Dvorak-Winston	Recurring role (seasons 2–7)
2011	Chaos	Irina	"Eaten by Wolves"
2012	Perception	Paulina	"Faces"
2015	Agents of S.H.I.E.L.D.	Eva Belyakov	"Melinda"
2015	Legends	Det. Gabriella Laska	Main role season 2
2017	Code Black	Monica	"One in a Million"
2017–18	Bosch	Amy Snyder	Recurring role (seasons 3–4)
