= San Diego Film Critics Society Award for Best Director =

Annual US film award

The San Diego Film Critics Society Award for Best Director is an award given by the San Diego Film Critics Society to honor the finest directing achievements in filmmaking.

== Winners ==
=== 1990s ===
Year	Winner	Film
1996	Joel Coen	Fargo
1997	James Cameron	Titanic
1998	John Madden	Shakespeare in Love
1999	David Lynch	The Straight Story

=== 2000s ===
Year	Winner	Film
2000	Cameron Crowe	Almost Famous
2001	Terry Zwigoff	Ghost World
2002	Jill Sprecher	Thirteen Conversations About One Thing
2003	Peter Jackson	The Lord of the Rings: The Return of the King
2004	Clint Eastwood	Million Dollar Baby
2005	Bennett Miller	Capote
2006	Clint Eastwood	Letters from Iwo Jima
2007	Paul Thomas Anderson	There Will Be Blood
2008	Danny Boyle	Slumdog Millionaire
2009	Quentin Tarantino	Inglourious Basterds

=== 2010s ===
Year	Winner	Film
2010	Darren Aronofsky	Black Swan
2011	Nicolas Winding Refn	Drive
2012	Ben Affleck	Argo
2013	Alfonso Cuarón	Gravity
2014	Dan Gilroy	Nightcrawler
2015	George Miller	Mad Max: Fury Road
2016	David Mackenzie	Hell or High Water
2017	Greta Gerwig	Lady Bird
2018	Debra Granik	Leave No Trace
2019	Benny and Josh Safdie	Uncut Gems

=== 2020s ===
Year	Winner	Film
2020	Chloé Zhao	Nomadland
2021	Jane Campion	The Power of The Dog
2022	Daniel Kwan and Daniel Scheinert	Everything Everywhere All at Once
2023	Martin Scorsese	Killers of the Flower Moon
2024	Denis Villeneuve	Dune: Part Two
2025	Ryan Coogler	Sinners
