= San Diego Film Critics Society Awards 2002 =

Annual US film awards ceremony

7th SDFCS Awards

December 20, 2002

Best Film:
Far from Heaven

The 7th San Diego Film Critics Society Awards, given by the San Diego Film Critics Society on 20 December 2002, honored the best in film for 2002.

== Winners ==
- Best Actor:
  - Daniel Day-Lewis – Gangs of New York
- Best Actress:
  - Julianne Moore – Far from Heaven
- Best Cinematography:
  - Road to Perdition – Conrad L. Hall
- Best Director:
  - Jill Sprecher – Thirteen Conversations About One Thing
- Best Editing:
  - Thirteen Conversations About One Thing – Stephen Mirrione
- Best Film:
  - Far from Heaven
- Best Foreign Language Film:
  - Talk to Her (Hable con ella) • Spain
- Best Production Design:
  - Minority Report – Alex McDowell
- Best Screenplay – Adapted:
  - Adaptation. – Charlie and Donald Kaufman
- Best Screenplay – Original:
  - Thirteen Conversations About One Thing – Jill Sprecher and Karen Sprecher
- Best Supporting Actor:
  - Chris Cooper – Adaptation.
- Best Supporting Actress:
  - Michelle Pfeiffer – White Oleander
- Body of Work Award:
  - Isabelle Huppert – The Piano Teacher, Les destinées sentimentales (a.k.a. Les Destinées), Merci pour le chocolat (a.k.a. Nightcap) and 8 Women
