= 1996 Laurence Olivier Awards =

Edition of London theatre awards

The 1996 Laurence Olivier Awards were held in 1996 in London celebrating excellence in West End theatre by the Society of London Theatre.

== Winners and nominees ==
Details of winners (in bold) and nominees, in each award category, per the Society of London Theatre.

Play of the Year	Best New Musical
**Skylight by David Hare – National Theatre Cottesloe / Wyndham's**; Pentecost by David Edgar – RSC at the Young Vic; Taking Sides by Ronald Harwood – Criterion; The Steward of Christendom by Sebastian Barry – Royal Court	**Jolson – Victoria Palace**; Fame – Cambridge; Hot Mikado – Queen's; Mack and Mabel – Piccadilly
Best Comedy
**Mojo by Jez Butterworth – Royal Court**; Communicating Doors by Alan Ayckbourn – Gielgud / Savoy; Funny Money by Ray Cooney – Playhouse
Best Actor	Best Actress
**Alex Jennings as Peer Gynt in Peer Gynt – RSC at the Young Vic**; Michael Gambon as Tom Sergeant in Skylight – National Theatre Cottesloe / Wyndham's; Daniel Massey as Wilhelm Furtwängler in Taking Sides – Criterion; Donal McCann as Thomas Dunne in The Steward of Christendom – Royal Court	**Judi Dench as Christine Foskett in Absolute Hell – National Theatre Lyttelton**; Diana Rigg as Mother Courage in Mother Courage and Her Children – National Theatre Olivier; Zoë Wanamaker as Amanda Wingfield in The Glass Menagerie – Donmar Warehouse / Comedy; Lia Williams as Kyra Hollis in Skylight – National Theatre Cottesloe / Wyndham's
Best Actor in a Musical	Best Actress in a Musical
**Adrian Lester as Robert in Company – Donmar Warehouse**; Brian Conley as Al Jolson in Jolson – Victoria Palace; Ross Lehman as Koko in Hot Mikado – Queen's; Clarke Peters as Nat King Cole in Unforgettable – Garrick	**Judi Dench as Desirée Armfeldt in A Little Night Music – National Theatre Olivier**; Elizabeth Mansfield as Marie Lloyd in Marie – Fortune; Caroline O'Connor as Mabel Normand in Mack and Mabel – Piccadilly; Elaine Paige as Norma Desmond in Sunset Boulevard – Adelphi
Best Supporting Performance	Best Supporting Performance in a Musical
**Simon Russell Beale as Mosca in Volpone – National Theatre Olivier**; Ben Chaplin as Tom Wingfield in The Glass Menagerie – Donmar Warehouse / Comedy; Geraldine McEwan as Lady Wishfort in The Way of the World – National Theatre Lyttelton; Claire Skinner as Laura Wingfield in The Glass Menagerie – Donmar Warehouse / Comedy	**Sheila Gish as Joanne in Company – Donmar Warehouse**; John Bennett as Louis Epstein in Jolson – Victoria Palace; Siân Phillips as Madame Armfeldt in A Little Night Music – National Theatre Olivier; Sophie Thompson as Amy in Company – Donmar Warehouse
Best Director	Best Theatre Choreographer
**Sam Mendes for Company – Donmar Warehouse and The Glass Menagerie – Donmar Warehouse / Comedy**; Richard Eyre for La Grande Magia – National Theatre Lyttelton and Skylight – National Theatre Cottesloe / Wyndham's; Adrian Noble for A Midsummer Night's Dream – RSC at the Barbican; Matthew Warchus for Henry V – RSC at the Barbican and Volpone – National Theatre Olivier	**Dein Perry for Tap Dogs – Sadler's Wells**; Lars Bethke for Fame – Cambridge; Wayne McGregor for A Little Night Music – National Theatre Olivier
Best Set Designer	Best Costume Designer
**John Napier for Burning Blue – Theatre Royal Haymarket**; John Gunter for Absolute Hell – National Theatre Lyttelton, Skylight – National Theatre Cottesloe / Wyndham's and Twelfth Night – RSC at the Barbican; Rob Howell for The Glass Menagerie – Donmar Warehouse / Comedy; Anthony Ward for A Midsummer Night's Dream – RSC at the Barbican, La Grande Magia and The Way of the World – National Theatre Lyttelton	**Anthony Ward for A Midsummer Night's Dream – RSC at the Barbican, La Grande Magia and The Way of the World – National Theatre Lyttelton**; Deirdre Clancy for Absolute Hell – National Theatre Lyttelton and Twelfth Night – RSC at the Barbican; Nicky Gillibrand for A Little Night Music – National Theatre Olivier; Richard Hudson for Volpone – National Theatre Olivier
Best Lighting Designer
**David Hersey for Burning Blue – Theatre Royal Haymarket, The Glass Menagerie – Donmar Warehouse / Comedy and Twelfth Night – RSC at the Barbican**; Mark Henderson for Absolute Hell and La Grande Magia – National Theatre Lyttelton and Indian Ink – Aldwych; Peter Mumford for Mother Courage and Her Children, Volpone – National Theatre Olivier and Richard II – National Theatre Cottesloe; Chris Parry for A Midsummer Night's Dream – RSC at the Barbican and The Way of the World – National Theatre Lyttelton
Outstanding Achievement in Dance	Best New Dance Production
**Siobhan Davies for choreographing The Art of Touch, Siobhan Davies Dance Company – Sadler's Wells**; Deborah Bull in Steptext, The Royal Ballet – Royal Opera House; Sylvie Guillem in Episodes, Béjart Ballet Lausanne – Sadler's Wells; Marion Tait in Pillar of Fire, Birmingham Royal Ballet – Royal Opera House	**Swan Lake, Adventures in Motion Pictures – Sadler's Wells**; Saints and Shadows, Arc Dance Company – Sadler's Wells; SH-BOOM, 10 Dancers Ensemble – Sadler's Wells; Who Cares, Les Ballets de Monte Carlo – Sadler's Wells
Outstanding Achievement in Opera	Outstanding New Opera Production
**Bernard Haitink for conducting Götterdämmerung and Siegfried, The Royal Opera – Royal Opera House**; Jonathan Miller for directing Carmen, English National Opera – London Coliseum; Bryn Terfel in Salome, The Royal Opera – Royal Opera House; John Tomlinson in Billy Budd and Siegfried, The Royal Opera – Royal Opera House	**Billy Budd, The Royal Opera – Royal Opera House**; A Midsummer Night's Dream, English National Opera – London Coliseum; Salome, The Royal Opera – Royal Opera House; Siegfried, The Royal Opera – Royal Opera House
Society Special Award
**Harold Pinter**

== Productions with multiple nominations and awards ==
The following 20 productions, including two operas, received multiple nominations:

- 6: The Glass Menagerie
- 5: Skylight
- 4: A Little Night Music, A Midsummer Night's Dream, Absolute Hell, Company, La Grande Magia, The Way of the World and Volpone
- 3: Jolson, Siegfried and Twelfth Night
- 2: Burning Blue, Fame, Hot Mikado, Mack and Mabel, Mother Courage and Her Children, Salome, Taking Sides and The Steward of Christendom

The following three productions received multiple awards:

- 3: Company
- 2: Burning Blue and The Glass Menagerie

== See also ==
- 50th Tony Awards
