= San Diego Film Critics Society Award for Best Original Screenplay =

Annual US film award

The San Diego Film Critics Society Award for Best Original Screenplay is a film award given by the San Diego Film Critics Society.

== Winners ==
=== 1990s ===
Year	Winner	Writer(s)
1997	As Good as It Gets	James L. Brooks
1998	Sliding Doors	Peter Howitt
1999	Being John Malkovich	Charlie Kaufman

=== 2000s ===
Year	Winner	Writer(s)
2000	Almost Famous	Cameron Crowe
2001	Donnie Darko	Richard Kelly
2002	Thirteen Conversations About One Thing	Jill and Karen Sprecher
2003	The Magdalene Sisters	Peter Mullan
2004	Vera Drake	Mike Leigh
2005	Kiss Kiss Bang Bang	Shane Black
2006	The Dead Girl	Karen Moncrieff
2007	Juno	Diablo Cody
2008	The Visitor	Tom McCarthy
2009	Inglourious Basterds	Quentin Tarantino

=== 2010s ===
Year	Winner	Writer(s)
2010	Four Lions	Chris Morris, Jesse Armstrong, and Sam Bain
2011	Midnight in Paris	Woody Allen
2012	The Master	Paul Thomas Anderson
2013	Her	Spike Jonze
2014	Nightcrawler	Dan Gilroy
2015	What We Do in the Shadows	Jemaine Clement and Taika Waititi
2016	Hell or High Water	Taylor Sheridan
2017	Get Out	Jordan Peele
2018	Eighth Grade	Bo Burnham
2019	Marriage Story	Noah Baumbach

=== 2020s ===
Year	Winner	Writer(s)
2020	Minari	Lee Isaac Chung
2021	Mass	Fran Kranz
2022	The Banshees of Inisherin	Martin McDonagh
2023	Barbie	Greta Gerwig and Noah Baumbach
2024	Anora	Sean Baker
2025	It Was Just an Accident	Jafar Panahi
