= Deserted =

Deserted may refer to:

- Desertion, the act of abandoning or withdrawing support from an entity to which one has given. This most commonly refers to a military desertion.
- Deserted (film), a 2016 film
- "Deserted", a song by Blind Melon from their 1992 album Blind Melon
- Deserted, a 2019 album by the Mekons
