= Stephen Mirrione =

American film editor (born 1969)

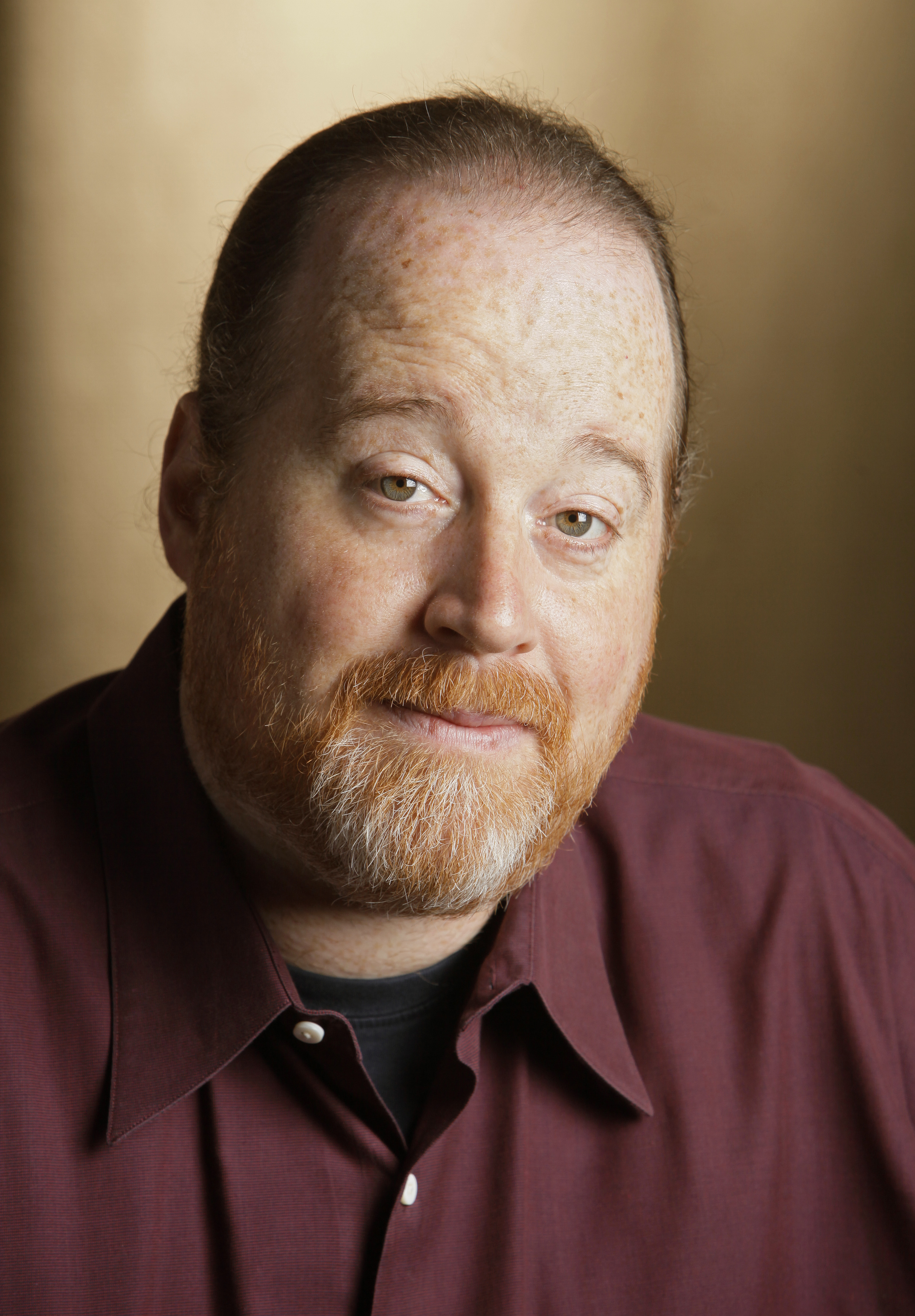
- Stephen Mirrione in 2011
- Born: February 17, 1969 (age 57); Santa Clara County, California, United States
- Education: University of California, Santa Cruz
- Occupation: Film editor

Stephen Mirrione (born February 17, 1969) is an American film editor. He is best known for winning an Academy Award for his editing of the film Traffic (2000).

== Life and career ==
Mirrione was born in Santa Clara County, California. He attended Bellarmine College Preparatory and then the University of California, Santa Cruz, from which he received his bachelor's degree in 1991. He moved to Los Angeles, and began a collaboration with Doug Liman, who was then a graduate student at the University of Southern California School of Cinematic Arts. Mirrione edited Liman's first feature films Getting In (1994), Swingers (1996), and Go (1999), which was an homage to Akira Kurosawa's 1950 film Rashomon.

Mirrione has had a notable collaboration with director Steven Soderbergh. The two met when Soderbergh attended the opening of Go. About one year later, he asked Mirrione to edit Traffic (2000), which earned Mirrione an Oscar. Todd McCarthy characterized the effects of the camerawork and editing: "Soderbergh has given the film tremendous texture as well as a vibrant immediacy through constant handheld operating, mostly using available light, and manipulating the look both in shooting and in the lab. Stephen Mirrione's editing, which gives Traffic a beautifully modulated overall shape, is characterized on a moment-to-moment basis by jump cuts and jagged rhythms. Overall result is far too stylized to call the approach verite, but pic looks far more caught-on-the-run, and therefore far less staged, than all but a few other American films."

Mirrione subsequently edited all three of the Ocean's films directed by Soderbergh and starring George Clooney (Ocean's Eleven (2001), Ocean's Twelve (2004), and Ocean's Thirteen (2007)), as well as The Informant! (2009) and Contagion (2011).

Mirrione won an American Cinema Editors "Eddie" Award in 2006 for his editing of Alejandro González Iñárritu's film Babel, for which he was also nominated for an Academy Award. He has been nominated four times for BAFTA Awards for editing Traffic, 21 Grams (also directed by Inarritu – 2003), Good Night, and Good Luck (directed by George Clooney-2005), and for Babel.

Mirrione has been selected for membership in the American Cinema Editors.

== Selected filmography ==
Year	Film	Director
1994	Getting In	Doug Liman
1995	Monster Mash: The Movie	Joel Cohen and Alec Sokolow
1996	Swingers	Doug Liman
1997	Clockwatchers	Jill Sprecher
1999	Go	Doug Liman
2000	Traffic	Steven Soderbergh
2001	Ocean's Eleven	Steven Soderbergh
2001	Thirteen Conversations About One Thing	Jill Sprecher
2002	Confessions of a Dangerous Mind	George Clooney
2003	21 Grams	Alejandro Gonzalez-Inarritu
2004	Criminal	Gregory Jacobs
2004	Ocean's Twelve	Steven Soderbergh
2005	Good Night, and Good Luck	George Clooney
2006	Babel	Alejandro González Iñárritu
2007	To Each His Own Cinema (segment "Anna")	Alejandro González Iñárritu
2007	Ocean's Thirteen	Steven Soderbergh
2008	Leatherheads	George Clooney
2009	The Informant!	Steven Soderbergh
2010	Biutiful	Alejandro González Iñárritu
2011	The Ides of March	George Clooney
2011	Contagion	Steven Soderbergh
2012	The Hunger Games	Gary Ross
2013	August: Osage County	John Wells
2014	The Monuments Men	George Clooney
2014	Birdman or (The Unexpected Virtue of Ignorance)	Alejandro González Iñárritu
2015	The Revenant	Alejandro González Iñárritu
2017	Suburbicon	George Clooney
2020	The Midnight Sky	George Clooney
2022	Spiderhead	Joseph Kosinski
2025	F1	Joseph Kosinski
2026	Digger	Alejandro González Iñárritu

== Academy Awards and nominations ==
- 2000 – Traffic (won) Academy Award Film Editing
- 2006 – Babel (nominated) Academy Award Film Editing
- 2015 – The Revenant (nominated) Academy Award Film Editing
- 2025 – F1 (nominated) Academy Award Film Editing

see: Academy Award for Best Film Editing

== Other awards and nominations ==
- 2000 – Traffic (nominated) BAFTA Film Award Best Editing
- 2000 – Traffic (nominated) American Cinema Editors ACE Eddie Best Edited Feature Film – Dramatic
- 2002 – Thirteen Conversations About One Thing (won) San Diego Film Critics Society SDFCS Award Best Editing
- 2003 – 21 Grams (nominated) BAFTA Film Award Best Editing
- 2005 – Good Night, and Good Luck (nominated) BAFTA Film Award Best Editing
- 2005 – Good Night, and Good Luck (nominated) American Cinema Editors ACE Eddie Best Edited Feature Film – Dramatic
- 2006 – Babel (won) Cannes Film Festival Vulcain Prize – Awarded to a technical artist by the C.S.T.
- 2006 – Babel (nominated) BAFTA Film Award Best Editing
- 2006 – Babel (won) American Cinema Editors ACE Eddie Best Edited Feature Film – Dramatic
- 2010 – Biutiful (nominated) 25th Goya Awards Best Editing
- 2013 – August: Osage County (nominated) American Cinema Editors ACE Eddie Best Edited Feature Film – Comedy or Musical
- 2014 – Birdman or (The Unexpected Virtue of Ignorance) (nominated) BAFTA Film Award Best Editing
- 2014 – Birdman or (The Unexpected Virtue of Ignorance) (nominated) American Cinema Editors ACE Eddie Best Edited Feature Film – Comedy or Musical
- 2015 – The Revenant (nominated) BAFTA Film Award Best Editing
- 2015 – The Revenant (nominated) American Cinema Editors ACE Eddie Best Edited Feature Film – Dramatic
