= Steven Lewis Simpson =

- Born: Scotland, United Kingdom
- Occupations: Film director, screenwriter

Steven Lewis Simpson is an independent film and documentary filmmaker from Aberdeen, Scotland. His films include Rez Bomb, Neither Wolf Nor Dog, The Ticking Man, Retribution, Ties, a feature documentary A Thunder-Being Nation that was made over 13 years about Pine Ridge Indian Reservation, and the 13-part TV series The Hub, which was the first original series commissioned by the first 24/7 Native American TV channel in the US, FNX.

In 2018, he gave a TEDx Talk about distributing his own film, Neither Wolf Nor Dog, in around 200 theatres in the US. Simpson claims it has been the longest first-run theatrical release of any movie in the US in at least a decade.

== History ==
At 18, Steven Lewis Simpson was the youngest fully qualified stockbroker and trader.
