= Springfontein Estate =

South African filming location

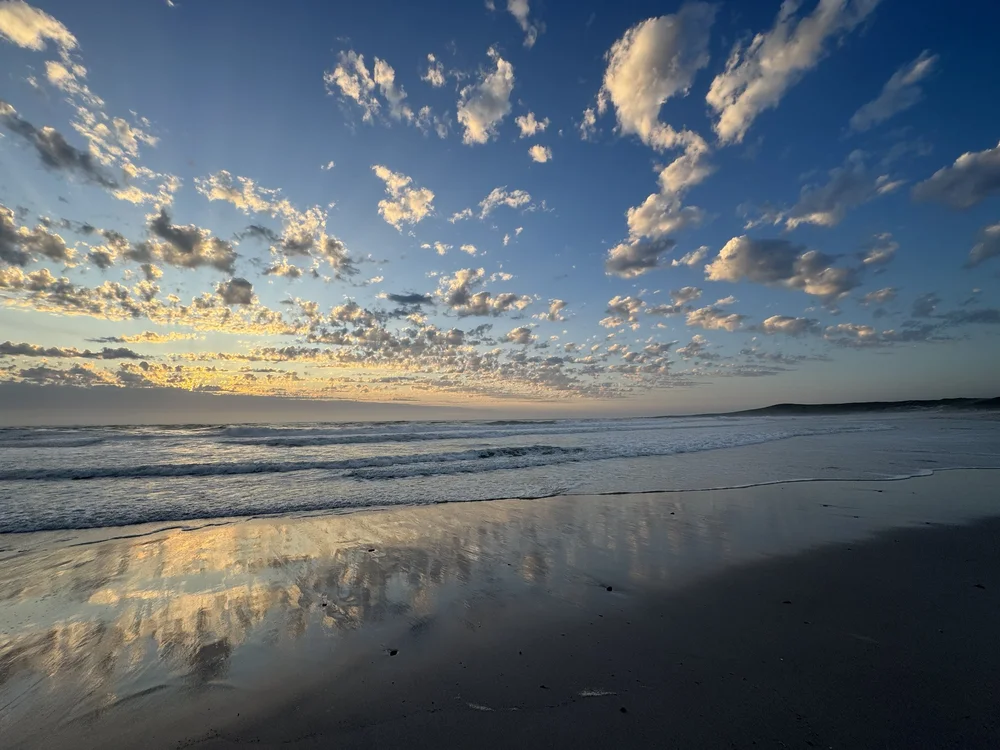
- Coastal beach and shoreline at Springfontein Estate
- Interactive map of Springfontein Estate
- Location: Cape Town, Western Cape, South Africa
- Coordinates: 33.592°S 18.3647°E
- Type: Filming location

Website
- https://springfonteinestate.com

Springfontein Estate is a natural outdoor filming location near Cape Town. Productions use the area for scenes requiring dunes, fynbos, coastline and open sandy terrain. The land appears in some historical documents under the name Groote Springfontein. The surrounding area is often chosen when productions want natural coastal terrain.

== Productions ==
According to the estate's production records, Springfontein has been used for films, television series and commercial shoots.

=== Films ===
- Black Beauty (2020)
- Escape Room 2
- Northmen: A Viking Saga
- Riff Raff

=== Television ===
- Black Sails (2014–2017)
- Outlander (Season 3)
- Raised by Wolves (Season 2)
- Resident Evil (2021)
- Saints & Strangers (Season 1)
- Troy: Fall of a City (Season 1)

=== Commercials and stills ===
Springfontein has hosted commercial and still-photography shoots for a range of international and South African brands.

Some examples include: Adidas, Azzaro Chrome United, Bank Pekao, Mini Boden, Canada Dry, EuroJackpot, Expedia Travel, Fjällräven, H&M Fashion, Jako-O, Marlboro, Petit Bateau, Stine Goya, Survivor, Toyota, WoolOvers, and kykNET.

== Location and ecology ==
Springfontein is located on the West Coast in a dune and fynbos environment north of Cape Town. The area has sandy soils, low shrubs and plant species adapted to wind, salt spray and winter rainfall. It forms part of the Cape Floristic Region, which is known for high levels of plant endemism.

The estate provides access to a range of coastal terrain such as beaches, rocky points, black rock formations, pebble sections, low cliffs and open sandy areas. The landscape also features fynbos vegetation, dune ridges and small seasonal wetlands. Several filming areas identified in scouting material include North Beach, Main Beach, Beacon Point, Black Rocks, The Ruins, The Ridge and Pebble Beach, each offering different terrain and horizons for outdoor scenes.

== See also ==
- List of film production companies
- List of television production companies
