= Neither Wolf Nor Dog =

2016 film directed by Steven Lewis Simpson

Neither Wolf Nor Dog is a feature film from Scottish director Steven Lewis Simpson, adapted from Kent Nerburn's novel of the same name, which won a Minnesota Book Awards in 1995. The film's festival premiere was at the Edinburgh International Film Festival in 2016. Simpson released it himself directly into U.S. cinemas in 2017 and it was still in first-run cinemas in 2019, which makes it the longest first-run theatrical release in the U.S. in over a decade. Due to the success of his self-distributed release, Simpson was asked to give a TEDx Talk on his innovative distribution model. The film stars Chief Dave Bald Eagle in the lead role as a Lakota elder. He was 95 years old at the time of filming and it was his first starring role in a film.

The film also stars Christopher Sweeney as Nerburn, Richard Ray Whitman as Grover, Roseanne Supernault as the twins Wenonah and Danelle, Tatanka Means as Delvin, Zahn McClarnon as Billy, and Harlen Standing Bear Sr, as Jumbo.

The film was primarily shot on Pine Ridge Indian Reservation, which borders South Dakota and Nebraska, and had scenes shot in Los Angeles and Rushville, Nebraska. One scene was shot in the same remote trailer house as a scene in the acclaimed film The Rider.

The film is notable for a climactic scene shot at Wounded Knee, where the script and the novel were thrown away and Dave Bald Eagle improvised the whole scene from his heart, as his family had a closer connection to the Wounded Knee Massacre of 1890 than even the character he was playing. At the end of filming the scene, he turned to Christopher Sweeney, who was acting opposite him, and said, "I've been holding that in for 95 years". Dave Bald Eagle saw the film before he died and he said, "It's the only film I've been in about my people that told the truth."

On Rotten Tomatoes, the film has an approval rating of 82% based on reviews from 17 critics.

Simpson has also self-distributed the film into other markets, including Canada, the United Kingdom, and Bulgaria so far.

Box Office magazine profiled for the cinema industry in the US the success of the film's innovative release strategy.
