= Ashley Avis =

American screenwriter, director, and producer

- Avis in 2010
- Born: 27 January 1987 (age 39); Chicago, Illinois
- Education: Manhattan College
- Occupations: Film director; screenwriter; editor; producer
- Years active: 2009–present
- Spouse: Edward Winters (m. 2015)

Ashley Avis (born January 27, 1987) is an American screenwriter, director, editor, and producer. Her feature films include Disney's Black Beauty (2020) starring Kate Winslet and Mackenzie Foy along with the Critics Choice nominated documentary, Wild Beauty: Mustang Spirit of the West.

She is also a journalist and published author, with work featured in publications such as Rolling Stone.

== Early life ==
Avis was born in Chicago, Illinois to Richard Avis and Victoria Woods. She has one younger brother, Richard Avis. At five years old, Avis' family relocated from Chicago to St. Petersburg, Florida where Avis grew up. She was a competitive equestrian from the age of seven to seventeen, competing on the hunter/jumper circuit in Florida.

Avis has expressed that she always wanted to become a writer, and thought she would eventually become a young adult author or novelist. She attended college in New York, double majoring in International Business and Marketing at Manhattan College in Riverdale, and graduated in three years in 2008. She worked as a real estate agent, a web designer, and at Nielsen Media as a journalist, eventually being promoted to the regional editor during her college years. After trying theater in Manhattan, she became attracted to writing screenplays.

== Career ==
In 2009, Avis relocated from New York to Los Angeles, California, saving up money to produce her first pilot for a series called The Cynical Life. Because she didn't have the funds to hire a producer or a director, she took on those roles herself. The project caught the attention of Lionsgate founder Frank Giustra, who executive produced three episodes. From there, Avis directed and produced the classical music documentary Opus X, featuring Lone Madsen and Caroline Campbell.

Avis formed her production company Alchemy Pictures in 2010, and began directing and producing branded commercial content, eventually landing clients such as Mercedes-Benz, Coca-Cola, Red Bull, Pfizer, and the Cali Group.

In 2015, Avis made her directorial debut with the psychological thriller Deserted. She wrote the original screenplay and also produced the film, which was edited by Douglas Crise. In 2016, she directed her second feature, the coming of age story Adolescence, starring India Eisley, Elisabeth Rohm, Tommy Flanagan, and Jere Burns. The film also features the original music of Zac Brown Band member John Driskell Hopkins.

In 2016, Avis traveled to Cape Town, South Africa for the Bokeh South African International Film Festival, where she won the Mercedes-Benz award for her film Bespoke. In 2018, she worked with Oscar winner Cloris Leachman, Betsy Brandt, and Sascha Nastasi on Being and Nothingness, and in 2019, she embarked on a feature-length documentary project that would eventually span five years, Wild Beauty: Mustang Spirit of the West.

In 2020, Avis wrote, directed, and edited Black Beauty for Disney+ and Constantin Film based on Anna Sewell's classic novel starring Oscar Winner Kate Winslet, Mackenzie Foy, and Iain Glen.

From 2022 through 2023, Avis' documentary Wild Beauty: Mustang Spirit of the West debuted on the film festival circuit, aimed to raise awareness for the eradication of wild horses across Western public lands. Wild Beauty premiered at the Breckenridge Film Festival in 2022. Avis was awarded with a Special Congressional Commendation in 2023 for her work on behalf of America's equids, by Congresswoman Dina Titus (D-NV). The film was a 2023 Critics Choice nominee, and named a top tier 2024 Oscar contender by Variety, Hollywood Reporter and Deadline.

Wild Beauty: Mustang Spirit of the West, has won several awards on the film festival circuit, including "Best Documentary" at the 2022 Boston Film Festival, The Joe Williams award for "Best Documentary" at the 2022 St. Louis International Film Festival, "Best Director" and "Best Cinematography" at 2022 DOCLA.

In July 2024, Avis was brought aboard to write and direct American Wolf for Apple Original Films, based on the book by Nate Blakeslee. The film will be produced by Appian Way, led by Leonardo DiCaprio and Jennifer Davisson.

Avis is also set to write and direct the remake of City of Angels for Warner Bros. for producer Charles Roven of Oppenheimer, while also recently becoming the first Western woman to direct a movie in Saudi Arabia, recently helming "The Lamb."

== Philanthropy ==
Following her feature film Black Beauty, Avis formed the California-based 501(c)(3) nonprofit The Wild Beauty Foundation; with a mission of rescuing wild and domestic horses in need, along with raising awareness through film and educational programs for children.

In 2021, she launched "A Day With a Horse" for the patients of St. Jude Children's Research Hospital, and has spoken to children across the country to encourage them to protect the environment, including writing letters to their Members of Congress on behalf of wild horses. In 2022, a wild horse Avis rescued from the slaughter pipeline was adopted by Black Beauty star Mackenzie Foy, who is also an Ambassador for the foundation.

== Personal life ==
In 2013, Avis met her future husband and producing partner Edward Winters. They became engaged in 2014 in Cape Town, South Africa, and were married on June 6, 2015.

== Filmography ==
Year	Title	Role	Notes
2016	Deserted	Director, Writer	
2017	The Trouble with Mistletoe	Director	
2018	Adolescence	Director, Writer	
2019	Being and Nothingness	Director, Writer, Editor	Short
2020	Black Beauty	Director, Writer, Editor	Disney+
2022	Wild Beauty: Mustang Spirit of the West	Director, Writer, Producer, Editor	Documentary
2024	Lamb	Director	
