= Undeclared =

American television sitcom

- Genre: Sitcom
- Created by: Judd Apatow
- Starring: Jay Baruchel; Carla Gallo; Charlie Hunnam; Monica Keena; Seth Rogen; Timm Sharp; Loudon Wainwright
- Theme music composer: The Dandy Warhols
- Opening theme: "Solid"
- Country of origin: United States
- Original language: English
- No. of seasons: 1
- No. of episodes: 17

Production
- Executive producer: Judd Apatow
- Camera setup: Single-camera
- Running time: 22 minutes
- Production companies: Apatow Productions; DreamWorks Television

Original release
- Network: Fox
- Release: September 25, 2001 – March 12, 2002

Undeclared is an American sitcom created by Judd Apatow, which aired on Fox from September 25, 2001, to March 12, 2002. The show has developed a cult following, and in 2012, Entertainment Weekly listed it at #16 in the "25 Best Cult TV Shows from the Past 25 Years".

== Premise ==
The half-hour comedy was Judd Apatow's follow-up to an earlier television series he worked on, Freaks and Geeks, which also lasted for one season. Undeclared centers on a group of college freshmen at the fictional University of Northeastern California. Unlike Freaks and Geeks, it is set contemporaneously (early 2000s) rather than the early 1980s.

== Characters ==
=== Main ===
Name	Actor	Major	Description
Steven Karp	Jay Baruchel	Undeclared	A celibate geek in high school, Steven has a particular affinity for The Matrix and The X-Files. He grew up only ten minutes away from the UNEC campus. In college, Steven is fairly popular among the students, but he is still somewhat nerdy.
Lizzie Exley	Carla Gallo	Psychology	Steven's highly enthusiastic, somewhat neurotic floor mate and eventual girlfriend. She initially dated Eric (Jason Segel) but she dumped him after she'd slept with Steven during their first day at UNEC.
Lloyd Haythe	Charlie Hunnam	Theater	Steven's English roommate. He often makes Steven leave their room so that he can have sex. Despite constantly picking on Steven, Lloyd is protective of him and tries to look out for his best interests. Due to his popularity with women, Lloyd often serves as an adviser in romantic affairs to all his suite mates. He frequently emphasizes his "Britishness" and mannered temperament, however, Lloyd is also the most aggressive of the group, and quick to anger.
Rachel Lindquist	Monica Keena	Undeclared	Lizzie's roommate. Is initially nervous at the prospect of living away from her family, but eventually breaks free of her anxiety and embraces a party girl mentality.
Ron Garner	Seth Rogen	Business	Steven's wise-cracking, glasses-wearing, beer-guzzling, chubby Canadian suite-mate who comes to UNEC from Vancouver. With his dry sense of humor, Ron is the brains of the group. Briefly dates Kelly (Busy Philipps), a campus tour guide.
Marshall Nesbitt	Timm Sharp	Music	Steven's suite-mate who came to UNEC from Sioux City, Iowa. His parents still believe that he is a business major, although he switched courses at the last minute. Despite his less-than-stellar work ethic, he is Mr. Burundi's (Gerry Bednob) favorite worker at the cafeteria. He has a big crush on Rachel, but never has the courage to ask her on a date.
Hal Karp	Loudon Wainwright III	(N/A)	Steven's father, who experiences a mid-life crisis after being divorced by Steven's mother. Hal sometimes spends time socially with the gang, which often results in Steven's embarrassment.
Tina Ellroy	Christina Payano	Unknown	Lizzie and Rachel's suite-mate introduced mid-season. Moves into the vacated room in Lizzie and Rachel's suite during the unaired episode "God Visits".

=== Recurring ===
- Perry Madison (Jarrett Grode), bland, sarcastic dorm-mate who can DJ and free-style rap. (12 episodes)
- Eric (Jason Segel), Lizzie's obsessive ex-boyfriend whom she breaks up with after sleeping with Steven. Eric had been dating Lizzie since she was in high school, and he is several years older than she is. Eric works as the manager of a copy shop. (7 episodes)
- Adam (Leroy Adams), student who lives on the gang's floor. (8 episodes)
- P.B. (P.B. Smiley), student who lives on the gang's floor. (6 episodes)
- Trent (Jim Brooks), student who lives on the gang's floor. (4 episodes)
- Lucien (Kevin Rankin), nerdy RA on the gang's floor who has an obsession with Hillary the RA. (4 episodes)
- Hillary (Amy Poehler), the head RA who hits on Lloyd; and at one point, dates Hal. (2 episodes)
- Luke (Kevin Hart), a religious student on campus who temporarily converts Steven to Christianity. (3 episodes)
- Greg (David Krumholtz), Eric's close friend and co-worker at the copy shop. (2 episodes)
- Eugene (Kyle Gass), Eric's other close friend and co-worker at the copy shop. (2 episodes)
- Mr. Burundi (Gerry Bednob), boss at the school cafeteria where Steven and Marshall work. (2 episodes)
- Kelly (Busy Philipps), an attractive tour guide on campus who Ron develops a crush on and later begins dating. (2 episodes)
- Susuki (Joanne Cho), Tina's roommate, whose constant violin practice annoys Tina. (2 episodes)

=== Guests and cameos ===
- Lizzy Caplan (as Pretty Girl, "Prototype")
- Jenna Fischer (as Sorority Girl, "Prototype" and Betty, "Sick in the Head")
- Simon Helberg (as Jack, "Prototype")
- Tom Welling (as Tom, "Prototype")
- Fred Willard (as Professor Duggan, "Oh, So You Have a Boyfriend?")
- Ted Nugent (as himself, "Full Bluntal Nugety")
- Mike White (as Pet Store Employee, "Eric Visits")
- Geoffrey Arend (as Jimmy, "Jobs, Jobs, Jobs")
- Katharine Towne (as Rebecca, "Sick in the Head")
- Allen Covert (as himself, "The Assistant")
- Jonathan Loughran (as himself, "The Assistant")
- Adam Sandler (as himself, "The Assistant")
- Greg Mottola (as Young Professor, "The Assistant")
- Jordan Black (as Card Guy, "Addicts")
- Will Ferrell (as Dave, "Addicts")
- Felicia Day (as Sheila, "God Visits")
- David Pasquesi (as Professor Beyser, "God Visits")
- Mary Kay Place (as Mrs. Lindquist, "Parents' Weekend")
- Kimberly Stewart (as Amanda Haythe, "Parents' Weekend")
- Amy Wright (as Debra Karp, "Parents' Weekend")
- Joel McKinnon Miller (as Mr. Nesbitt, "Parents' Weekend")
- Sarah Hagan (as Jordanna, "Eric Visits Again")
- Steve Bannos (as Dingleberry, "Rush and Pledge")
- Samm Levine (as Books, "Rush and Pledge"/"Hell Week")
- Natasha Melnick (as Jenni, "Rush and Pledge"/"Hell Week")
- Martin Starr (as Theo, "The Perfect Date")
- Youki Kudoh (as Kikuki, "Hal and Hilary")
- Ben Stiller (as Rex, "Eric's POV")

Numerous actors from Freaks and Geeks appeared on Undeclared portraying new characters, including Rogen, Segel, Levine, Starr, Phillips, and Melnick, among several others.

== Broadcast ==
=== Episodes ===
When first shown on network television, many episodes were aired out of order, much to Apatow's dismay. When originally released on DVD, the episodes were presented in their production order, which was a mistake according to Apatow. However, newer versions of the DVD present the episodes in the correct chronological order, restoring all storylines and character developments. In addition, an alternate version of the second episode, titled "Full Bluntal Nugety", is included on the DVD release of the series.

No.	Title	Directed by	Written by	Original release date	Prod. code	U.S. viewers (millions)
1	"Prototype"	Jake Kasdan	Judd Apatow	September 25, 2001	101	9.00
On Steven's first day at UNEC, he meets and has a one-night stand with Lizzie, unaware that she has a boyfriend. Steven's father Hal shows up at the floor party and announces that he is getting a divorce.
2	"Oh, So You Have a Boyfriend?" "Full Bluntal Nugety"	Paul Feig	Kristofor Brown	January 8, 2002	102	7.51
Lizzie admits to Steven that she has a boyfriend, but that does not stop him from pursuing her. The head RA Hillary has a crush on Lloyd, but Ron does not think it is a good idea for Lloyd to hook up with her. Marshall inspires a boring History teacher to revamp his teaching style, with cringe-worthy results.
3	"Eric Visits"	John Hamburg	Judd Apatow & Rodney Rothman	October 2, 2001	103	8.94
Lizzie's boyfriend visits her at UNEC. Steven convinces her to break up with Eric, but feels guilty and helps Eric win her back. Meanwhile, Ron brings up a whole keg of beer and urges his suitemates to help him finish it.
4	"Jobs, Jobs, Jobs"	Greg Mottola	Joel Madison	January 15, 2002	104	6.30
Steven is forced to get a job in the cafeteria to help pay his tuition until Hal finds "the right job".
5	"Sick in the Head"	Greg Mottola	Seth Rogen	October 16, 2001	105	8.49
Marshall gets sick, and Rachel volunteers to take care of him. Lloyd tries to start a real relationship with a girl. Steven makes friends in the rec room.
6	"The Assistant"	Judd Apatow	Judd Apatow & Seth Rogen & Nicholas Stoller	November 13, 2001	106	7.77
Adam Sandler holds a concert at UNEC, then hangs out at Steven's floor afterwards. Rachel hooks up with Adam's assistant, Loughran. Lloyd bonds with Hal, and Steven is not happy about it.
7	"Addicts"	Greg Mottola	Jennifer Konner & Alexandra Rushfield	October 9, 2001	108	8.56
Ron and Lloyd invest in a stock that rises then quickly drops. Steven, Lizzie and Rachel pay a druggie to do their papers, but he fails to deliver.
8	"God Visits"	John Hamburg	Rodney Rothman	Unaired	110	N/A
A fellow student convinces Steven to accept the Lord, while a professor makes Lloyd believe that everything is meaningless.
9	"Parents' Weekend"	John Hamburg	Rodney Rothman	January 22, 2002	111	8.05
Marshall is reluctant to let his parents know that he is not a business major. Ron gets propositioned by Lloyd's sister, Amanda. Rachel has to face the wrath of her control freak mother. Hal meets up with his estranged wife, Debra.
10	"Eric Visits Again"	Greg Mottola	Nicholas Stoller	November 20, 2001	109	6.64
Eric discovers that Lizzie cheated on him with Steven, and heads to UNEC to get his revenge. Lloyd helps Steven prepare for a fistfight.
11	"Rush and Pledge"	Jay Chandrasekhar	Kristofor Brown	December 11, 2001	112	6.64
Frustrated with the way his roommates have been treating him, Steven joins the Theta Delta Zeta fraternity. Meanwhile, Lizzie joins TDZ's Little Sisters.
12	"Hell Week"	Jay Chandrasekhar	Joel Madison & Seth Rogen	December 18, 2001	113	7.50
Steven is fed up with TDZ in more ways than one. He quits, but it is not without repercussions.
13	"Truth or Dare"	Greg Mottola	Story by : Judd Apatow; Teleplay by : Seth Rogen	January 29, 2002	107	6.09
The boys play a scripted game of Truth or Dare to help their chances with the girls.
14	"The Day After"	Judd Apatow	Judd Apatow & Seth Rogen	February 12, 2002	114	6.69
Steven is unsure of where he stands with Lizzie, and Lloyd's ideas are not helping him any. They spend their Saturday apart, but come to a revelation.
15	"The Perfect Date"	Greg Mottola	Judd Apatow & Brent Forrester	February 19, 2002	115	7.61
Steven plans the perfect date for Lizzie in order to show up Eric. Theo, Steven's friend from high school, shows up unexpectedly and ruins the day for Ron, Marshall and Lloyd.
16	"Hal and Hillary"	Jay Chandrasekhar	Kristofor Brown	March 5, 2002	116	6.72
On his way to see Steven, Hal meets and hooks up with the head RA Hillary. Ron and the gang see them getting it on, and Steven is bummed out. A jealous Lucien takes his anger out on Steven.
17	"Eric's POV"	Jon Favreau	Judd Apatow & Nicholas Stoller	March 12, 2002	117	6.52
Eric heads to UNEC to try to win Lizzie back. The boys sit in and watch Girls Gone Wild, while the girls try to add highlights to make Lizzie's hair look pretty, but fail miserably.

=== Planned storylines ===
The DVD contains the script to an unproduced episode, "Lloyd's Rampage" (written by Lewis Morton), which was written for the show's second season. It revolves around Lloyd getting into a fight with Kieran, the star student of his acting class, and deciding that he wants to experience real life. So, Steven and Lloyd go to a bar and end up in a fight with some working-class men, which impresses Kieran when Lloyd tells him about it. A subplot revolves around Marshall getting extremely drunk and throwing up in a bar. When he is throwing up, Perry takes a picture and video, and makes T-shirts and posters and puts them around campus. Marshall is embarrassed at first, but he is glad when he finds out about all of the attention that he gets as "Puke Dude". Unfortunately for him, this doesn't last long when everyone forgets about him after another student defecates in his pants in the library. Perry's last name is revealed to be Madison in this episode. The role of Kieran was written for That '70s Show star Topher Grace, but he never appeared in the episode because of a dispute between Apatow and That '70s Show co-creator Mark Brazill.

During a question-and-answer session, Judd Apatow stated that if the series had been picked up for a second season, there would have been an episode titled "Eric's Birthday" in which Lizzie and Steven would go to the birthday party mentioned in episode "Eric's POV". Linda Cardellini of Freaks and Geeks would have played his new girlfriend. In the episode, Eric would have had a cake with a picture of him and his new girlfriend printed on it. Lizzie would have been given the piece with Eric's new girlfriend's face. At the time, Segel and Cardellini were dating.

=== Syndication ===
At the beginning of February 2006, the show's underlying ownership shifted from DreamWorks to Viacom (now known as Paramount Skydance). That month, they acquired the rights to Undeclared and all other television shows and live-action movies DreamWorks produced since their inception, following their $1.6 billion purchase of the company's live-action film and television assets. The show has since been distributed by Paramount Pictures and its related television divisions.

In June 2010, it was announced that the Independent Film Channel had acquired the rights to air both Undeclared and Freaks and Geeks, another DreamWorks-produced show later acquired by Viacom/Paramount. Undeclared premiered on IFC on November 5, 2010. Both Undeclared and Freaks and Geeks began rerunning on the Viacom-owned TeenNick network on June 13, 2011. Netflix also had Undeclared (in the past) and had the episodes in their original chronological order.

== Home media ==
On August 16, 2005, Shout! Factory (under license from DreamWorks Home Entertainment) released the series on DVD. The four-disc boxed set contains all 17 episodes, including an unaired episode and a bonus director's cut.

According to Apatow, the producers were unable to get clearance for all the music in the series (not being able to use about 10 songs). Since the uncleared songs were considered to not play a significant role in the series, they were switched with a suitable substitute.

Undeclared: The Complete Series
Set details
Special features
- Studio: Shout! Factory/DreamWorks Home Entertainment
- 17 episodes
- 1.33:1 aspect ratio
- English (Dolby Digital 5.1 Surround)
- Subtitles: None
- A never-before-seen episode ("God Visits")
- Director's cut of the second episode featuring Ted Nugent ("Full Bluntal Nugety")
- 18 commentaries with directors, writers and the entire cast
- Deleted scenes, auditions, outtakes, rehearsals and extended takes
- Loudon Wainwright live concert footage
- Museum of Television & Radio Q&A
- 28-page booklet
- Script for unproduced episode
Release date
Region 1
August 16, 2005

== Reception ==
=== Critical reception ===
Undeclared received critical acclaim from television critics. On Metacritic, the series earned a score of 85 out of 100, based on 24 reviews, indicating "universal acclaim". On Rotten Tomatoes, it has an approval rating of 93% with an average score of 8.18/10 based on reviews from 30 critics. The website's critical consensus reads, "Undeclared lives in the shadow of its Apatow-produced predecessor but still delivers an insightful and sweet year of self-discovery on campus."

In 2020, Briana Kranich of Screen Rant named Undeclared as one of the 10 Most Underrated Shows Of the Noughties.

=== Ratings ===
The show averaged 7.3 million viewers and was #93 in the rankings during its only season.
