= Thin Ice (2011 film) =

- Theatrical release poster
- Directed by: Jill Sprecher
- Written by: Jill Sprecher; Karen Sprecher
- Produced by: Mary Frances Budig; Elizabeth Redleaf; Christine K. Walker
- Starring: Greg Kinnear; Alan Arkin
- Cinematography: Dick Pope
- Edited by: Lee Percy
- Music by: Jeff Danna
- Production company: Werc Werk Works
- Distributed by: ATO Pictures
- Release dates: January 25, 2011 (Sundance); February 17, 2012 (United States)
- Running time: 114 minutes (Sundance); 93 minutes (ATO Pictures)
- Country: United States
- Language: English

Thin Ice (originally released as The Convincer) is a 2011 American black comedy film directed by Jill Sprecher and starring Greg Kinnear, Alan Arkin and Billy Crudup.

== Plot summary ==
Wisconsin insurance salesman Mickey Prohaska is in desperate financial straits. His wife JoAnn has thrown him out of the house, and he is willing to do or say practically anything to sell anybody a policy. Mickey accompanies another insurance agent he has just met, Bob Egan, to the farm of an elderly man named Gorvy Hauer. The house is a mess and Gorvy is absent-minded, perhaps a tad senile. He does not have much money and the little he has, he seems to keep in a jar. Mickey tries to sell the old man some insurance anyway.

Gorvy also has an old violin. A man named Dahl, an appraiser from Chicago who has a shop filled with musical instruments, examines the violin and says it is somewhat rare and actually worth $25,000. Complications arise when Mickey's plan to steal the instrument is discovered by a small-time ex-con named Randy Kinney, who not only will not leave Mickey alone, but turns violent and bludgeons one of Gorvy's neighbors to death.

Continued inspection and research on the violin values it at forty times the original estimate. Mickey now is in possession of a million-dollar instrument, but Randy wants his share and threatens to kill Mickey if he does not get it. Mickey thinks he can still come out of this all right, until he discovers that he is in way over his head.

Mickey fires Bob Egan and goes to see Gorvy, who says he called an appraiser for his violin and was told that it was just a cheap imitation. He believes his original violin was stolen, because his dog left teeth marks on it, which this fake one doesn't have. A cop arrives to take the violin to the police station.

Randy takes Mickey for a drive in his car, and then asks why everyone is looking for the violin. When informed of the million dollar price tag on it, he demands they go to check out Leonard Dahl's violin store in Chicago. When they get there, they locate the phone number of another violin expert, Stoller.

Mickey has $1.25 million wired to Gorvy's account since the violin was insured. He also gets Randy to burn a photo he took when he killed Richie. But in a flashback, it is revealed that Gorvy, Randy, Dahl, Richie and Bob played a trick on Mickey and scammed his insurance company. Mickey confronts Dahl who confirms it's all a scam, but Mickey can't do anything about it.

Mickey starts another career selling timeshares.

== Cast ==
- Greg Kinnear as Mickey Prohaska
- Alan Arkin as Gorvy Hauer
- Billy Crudup as Randy Kinney
- Lea Thompson as Jo Ann Prohaska
- Bob Balaban as Leonard Dahl
- David Harbour as Bob Egan
- Michelle Arthur as Karla Gruenke
- Mike Hagerty as Jerry
- Landyn Banx as Actor
- Kirsten Gregerson as Patron

== Production ==
Filming began in February and ended in March 2010, and, though set in Wisconsin, was shot during winter in Minnesota; in Bloomington, St. Paul and Minnetonka in particular.

== Re-editing controversy ==
Entitled The Convincer, the initial edit of the film was screened in January 2011 at the Sundance Film Festival. Distribution rights were purchased by ATO Pictures. Both ATO and production company Werc Werk Works demanded that director/writer Jill Sprecher make sweeping changes to the film from the version shown at Sundance in order to speed the film up. The production company claimed that Sprecher "refused to be part of the process", while Sprecher stated that she was never allowed to review the distributor's notes to make any comments on them. The production company and distributor made the revisions without Sprecher's input, replacing the original composer, Alex Wurman, and the original editor, Stephen Mirrione. Sprecher was prevented from speaking to the press about the situation for legal reasons, but she had stated she is "heartbroken and devastated" and wanted to remove her name from the film, but under the terms of her contract she is not allowed to do so. The completely re-cut film was retitled Thin Ice. Sprecher reportedly learned of the name through the Internet and not from the production company.

== Reception ==
=== Original cut ===
The Convincer received generally positive reviews from critics at the Sundance Film Festival. Kyle Smith of the New York Post said in his review; "Kinnear is ideal for this role" and ultimately The Convincer turns out to be an ambitiously structured and clever scam movie". Rob Nelson of Variety said; "there are pitch-perfect comic notes from the whole ensemble (...) Stephen Mirrione's editing hits all the right beats, and Pope's brilliantly composed widescreen images of the Wisconsin tundra are as bright as any noir's could be".

=== Thin Ice ===
The re-cut Thin Ice received uniformly negative responses ("disappointing," "poorly edited," "a stinker") after screenings at B-List festivals in October 2011.

Thin Ice received positive responses from critics with a "fresh" rating of 69% on Rotten Tomatoes, based on 59 reviews.

== Release ==
The film premiered locally in Minneapolis at the Walker Art Center on October 12, 2011, completely re-cut and retitled as Thin Ice.

Following the further festival run, the film was released theatrically in February 2012.
