= Rez Bomb =

2008 film directed by Steven Lewis Simpson

- Directed by: Steven Lewis Simpson
- Written by: Steven Lewis Simpson
- Starring: Tamara Feldman; Trent Ford; Russell Means; Chris Robinson
- Release date: 2008
- Country: United States
- Language: English

Rez Bomb is a 2008 feature film directed and written filmmaker Steven Lewis Simpson and starring Tamara Feldman, Trent Ford, Russell Means, and Chris Robinson.

The film, a love story and thriller, is set in Pine Ridge Indian Reservation in South Dakota, which is the poorest place in the United States. The film was written to be shot in Scotland. The other main location was Rushville, Nebraska.

The film premiered at the Montreal World Film Festival in 2008.

== Film festivals ==
=== 2008 ===
Montreal World
South Dakota
Fort Lauderdale
Southern Appalachian
Santa Fe

=== 2009 ===
Victoria
Glasgow
Bermuda
Tiburon
