= Black Beauty (2020 film) =

- Disney+ release poster
- Directed by: Ashley Avis
- Screenplay by: Ashley Avis
- Based on: Black Beauty by Anna Sewell
- Produced by: Jeremy Bolt; Robert Kulzer
- Starring: Mackenzie Foy; Iain Glen; Calam Lynch; Claire Forlani; Fern Deacon
- Narrated by: Kate Winslet
- Cinematography: David Procter
- Edited by: Ashley Avis
- Music by: Guillaume Roussel
- Production companies: Walt Disney Pictures (uncredited); Constantin Film; JB Pictures; Bolt Pictures; Moonlighting Films
- Distributed by: Disney+
- Release date: November 27, 2020 (United States)
- Running time: 110 minutes
- Countries: United States; United Kingdom; South Africa; Germany; France
- Language: English
- Budget: $24 million

Black Beauty is a 2020 adventure drama family film written, edited and directed by Ashley Avis and based on the 1877 novel of the same name by Anna Sewell. A co-production between the United States, the United Kingdom, South Africa, France and Germany, it stars Kate Winslet, Mackenzie Foy, Iain Glen, Calam Lynch, Claire Forlani and Fern Deacon and is the sixth cinematic adaptation. In the film, Black Beauty is portrayed as a mare instead of a stallion and is brought to Birtwick Park where she forges a bond with a spirited teenager that carries through different chapters, challenges and adventures. Originally scheduled for a theatrical release, it was unable to be released in cinemas due to the negative effects of the COVID-19 pandemic. The film's distribution rights were acquired by Walt Disney Studios and was released on the company's streaming service Disney+ on November 27, 2020. It received mixed reviews from critics. The film was removed from Disney+ on May 26, 2023.

== Plot ==
A wild mustang narrates her life from birth, born free within the Onaqui Mountains of Utah. She explains that her mother taught that when horses pass away, they fly into the sky to rest among the stars. One day, the mustang draws the attention of some cowboys, who wrangle her herd; she never sees her mother again. A horse trainer named John Manly purchases the mustang and takes her to Birtwick, a horse sanctuary. While she likes John, the mustang refuses to cooperate, but John remains patient. The mustang befriends two other horses named Ginger and Merrylegs.

John is informed that his sister and her husband died in a car accident, leaving him to care for his niece, Jo Green. Jo wants nothing to do with John but becomes entranced with the difficult mustang. Eventually, the mustang recognizes Jo's pain as similar to her own, and they connect. Jo tames the mustang and names her Black Beauty, or Beauty for short. John gets through to Jo by having her work in the stables and tend to Beauty. They popularize the phrase "partnering" a horse as opposed to "breaking" a horse. John informs Jo that they will eventually have to sell Beauty, but Jo refuses.

During a bond between her and Jo, the latter grieves over her family while Beauty narrates that she hated seeing Jo upset but since Jo was unable to gallop, she decided to give Jo a ride across the stable. Suddenly, Jo begins to ride Beauty, John reacts in shock when James reports to John and Henry Gordon, thinking that Beauty escaped. In the slow-motion, Jo can feel the wind in her mane (which is her hair), it would help her to heal. Jo smiles as she rode for the first time until she fall off and landed on haystack. John comes to her aid, but Jo laughed and says it's fun. With that, John trained Jo to ride Beauty. Afterwards, Jo rides to the beach with Beauty, where she spread out her arms and she and Beauty were one.

One night, a fire breaks out when a stablehand doesn't turn off a heater, and the horses are evacuated. With Birtwick losing money, Jo is concerned that Beauty will be sold but works out a deal with Henry, so that she can work extra to earn the money to buy Beauty. The upperclass Winthorp family who are migrants from England arrive to purchase horses for their estate with the daughter Georgina immediately choosing Beauty to be leased. John convinces them to have Jo come along as her tenant. At the Earlshall estate, Beauty learns that her friend Ginger was purchased for the Winthorp's son George, who unlike Georgina, is kind and takes an interest in Jo.

Georgina is cruel and rude to Beauty, who resists the urge to harm her as it would get her and Jo in trouble. A race is held at a social gathering where Georgina's poor riding results in Beauty injuring a leg. George stands up to his mother, and the Winthorps return Beauty. However, John informs Jo that Birtwick is closing and all the horses have to be sold. Beauty is taken away without Jo getting a chance to say goodbye. She becomes determined to find and buy her again.

Beauty is sold to a ranger named Terry, and they go on rescue missions in the wilderness. Eventually Terry retires, and Beauty is given to a farmer who uses old tools, forcing her to work harder. Then she is sold to a kind carriage driver in New York City whose daughter names her Lady. One night, Beauty is reunited with Ginger, who had been sold without George's knowledge, but she dies shortly afterwards.

When Jerry gets sick, Beauty is sold to another carriage company, which treats its horses cruelly and engages in illegal horse trading. While out driving, Beauty spots Ginger's body being taken away. Heartbroken, Beauty sits on the road during her carriage rotation, which draws media attention. The company attempts to sell Beauty, but a kind stable boy named Manuel alerts the police of the company's illegal activities. Jo finds Beauty and reunites with her. Jo reveals that she has rebuilt Birtwick and works with John and George, now her husband, to rehabilitate horses; she even finds that Merrylegs was also recovered. Beauty lives with Jo for the rest of her days.

== Cast ==
- Kate Winslet as Black Beauty (voice)
- Mackenzie Foy as Jo Green
  - Faith Bodington as Jo Green (age 12)
- Iain Glen as John Manly, Jo's maternal uncle
- Calam Lynch as George Winthorp
- Fern Deacon as Georgina Winthorp, George's younger sister
- Hakeem Kae-Kazim as Terry
- Claire Forlani as Mrs. Winthorp, George's mother
- Matt Rippy as Henry Gordon
- Max Raphael as James
- David Sherwood as Mr. York
- Bjorn Steinbach as Mario
- Patrick Lyster as Mr. Winthorp, George's father
- Craig Hawks as Walker
- Katja Hopkins as Jill
- Greg Parvess as Jerry
- Sascha Nastasi as Jennifer
- Alex Jeaven as Jasmine
- Nahum Hughes as Manuel

Black Beauty is portrayed by four different horses: Spirit, Jenny, Awards and Rosie. The horse that portrays her as a foal is named Black Beauty. Beauty's mother Duchess, is portrayed by a horse named Beauty. Ginger was portrayed by Susie and Orion. Merrylegs was portrayed by Lulu Belle and Victoria.

== Production ==
It was announced in May 2019 that a new movie adaptation of Anna Sewell's 1877 novel Black Beauty was in development with Ashley Avis writing, editing and directing the film. Mackenzie Foy and Kate Winslet were set to star in the film. Filming began in South Africa in October 2019 with Claire Forlani and Iain Glen joining the cast, with key scenes shot at various locations to capture the film's natural landscapes, including Springfontein Estate. Director Ashley Avis later referenced the use of the site for selected aerial and stunt shots in interviews.

== Release ==
In July 2020, Walt Disney Pictures acquired distribution rights to the film from Constantin Film. Black Beauty was released digitally on Disney+ on November 27, 2020.

== Reception ==
On review aggregator Rotten Tomatoes, the film holds an approval rating of 48% based on 46 reviews, with a mixed-to-positive rating of 5.3/10. The website's critics consensus reads: "Unable to rein in the complexities of its source material, Black Beauty struggles to gallop out of the paddock." On Metacritic, it has a weighted average score of 52 out of 100, based on 12 critics, indicating "mixed or average" reviews.

Fionnuala Halligan of Screen Daily found the movie to be a solid reinterpretation of Anna Sewell's novel, complimented the performances of the actors, and praised the chemistry between Kate Winslet and Mackenzie Foy's characters, saying, "Like Anna Sewell's original novel, this film's heart is very much in the right place." Amy Amatangelo of Paste rated the film 7.8 out of 10, saying, "The movie looks stunning with sweeping landscapes and gorgeous shots of Beauty in action, as South Africa makes a lovely stand-in for both the American West and New York. An inspiring movie for young, old and everyone in between, I would be shocked if the movie's final moments didn't lead to a cathartic cry for every viewer. The beauty of this story is timeless." Jennifer Green of Common Sense Media rated the movie 3 out of 5 stars, praised the depiction of positive messages and role models, writing, "Black Beauty is emotionally taxing, with the central horse suffering abuse, loss, and danger. - That said, the film, told mostly from the horse's perspective, ultimately shows a clear respect and admiration for the animals, and it conveys positive messages of loyalty, family, perseverance, resilience."

Kayti Burt of Den of Geek rated the movie 2.5 out of 5 stars, praised Ashley Avis' direction, writing, "Ashley Avis hits all the plot points and throws in some fantastically pretty shots in the process, yet there is a lack of texture (both visually and narratively) that keeps this film from graduating from serviceable horse-girl film to something greater both within and outside the limits of Horse Girl Canon" and that the movie "lacks the thematic ambition of its source material, but is a serviceable addition to Horse Girl Canon." Sara Stewart of the New York Post rated the film 2.5 out of 5 stars, writing, "One of the purposes of the book was to shine a line on animal cruelty, which is admirable — but Black Beauty veers so often into the dark and the sad I question how much appeal it'll really have for the younger set. Still, if your tear ducts need cleaning, this is one holiday film that'll get the job done." Monica Castillo of RogerEbert.com rated the movie 2 out of 4 stars, claiming, "Avis' film clearly adores its four-legged subjects. Through David Procter's cinematography, she recreates the look and feel of one of Disney's nature documentaries for the first moments of Black Beauty's life. It's a golden-hour, idealized look at a herd of horses galloping through fields and in the shadows of mountains. [...] It's a narrative choice that may work better for some than others, and it probably won't ride well with devotees of the book."

== See also ==
- List of films about horses
