= Burning Blue (film) =

- Theatrical release poster
- Directed by: D.M.W. Greer
- Written by: Helene Kvale; D.M.W. Greer
- Based on: Burning Blue by D.M.W. Greer
- Produced by: John Hadity; Arthur J. Kelleher; Andrew Halliday
- Starring: Trent Ford; Rob Mayes
- Cinematography: Frederic Fasano
- Edited by: Bill Henry
- Music by: James Lavino
- Production companies: Burning Blue The Film L.P. Lionsgate
- Distributed by: Lionsgate Entertainment
- Release dates: June 29, 2013 (Frameline Film Festival); June 6, 2014
- Running time: 96 minutes
- Country: United States
- Language: English

Burning Blue is a 2013 American United States Naval aviation drama film, directed by D.M.W. Greer and starring Trent Ford and Rob Mayes. The film is based on the 1992 play of the same name by Greer about a U.S. Navy accident investigation which becomes a gay witch hunt during the "Don't Ask, Don't Tell" era.

== Plot ==
Best friends Lieutenants Dan Lynch (Trent Ford) and Will Stephensen (Morgan Spector) are U.S. Navy fighter pilots flying the McDonnell Douglas F/A-18C/D Hornet fighter aircraft. Both pilots have an aspiration to become the youngest pilots accepted into the space program. After two accidents, one of which is due to Will's failing eyesight, their unit is subject to a NCIS investigation led by John Cokely (Michael Sirow).

At the same time, a third pilot, Matt Blackwood (Rob Mayes), arrives on the carrier and quickly develops a close friendship with Dan, driving a wedge between Dan and Will. Cokely's investigation leads to him uncovering rumours about Dan and Matt's relationship just as they both begin to fall in love. When Matt decides to leave his wife and move in with Dan, there is a third accident, and Cokely's investigation ramps up the pressure on Dan. The investigation leads to a hearing at which Dan's father, an Admiral, chairs the panel. Rather than sign an admission that there was an isolated encounter with Matt, so that he could continue serving in the Air Force under the applicable regulations, Dan resigns his commission.

== Cast ==
- Trent Ford as Lieutenant Dan Lynch
- Morgan Spector as Lieutenant William Stephensen
- Rob Mayes as Lieutenant Matthew Blackwood
- William Lee Scott as Charlie Trumbo
- Michael Sirow as John Cokely
- Cotter Smith as Admiral Lynch
- Tammy Blanchard as Susan
- Tracy Weiler as Nancy
- Gwynneth Bensen as Tammi
- Mark Doherty as Skipper
- Chris Chalk as Special Agent Jones
- Timothée Chalamet as Dylan Lynch
- Jordan Dean as Stewie Kelleher
- Johnny Hopkins as Gorden
- Haviland Morris as Grace Lynch
- Karolina Muller as Olenka
- Michael Cumpsty as Admiral Stephensen

== Production ==
Burning Blue was based on the 1992 play by D.M.W. Greer, his first play. The film adaptation began production in 2010, with principal photography taking place primarily in New York City and Long Island, New York. Some of the aerial and naval scenes used the USS John C. Stennis (CVN-74) aircraft carrier identified as the fictitious CVN-44. The scenes on the deck of the USS John C. Stennis showed current operational United States Navy aircraft and equipment including:

- Boeing E-3B Sentry
- Grumman F-14 Tomcat
- Lockheed S-3B Viking
- McDonnell Douglas F/A-18C/D Hornet
- Northrop Grumman EA-6B Prowler
- Sikorsky SH-3 Sea King
- Sikorsky SH-60 Seahawk

(Note: The USS John C. Stennis (CVN-74) has been used in filming for the Jag and the film, Stealth (film), 2005.)

The scene at Naval Air Station Oceana was actually photographed at CFB Cold Lake, Alberta, Canada. Canadian CF-18 Hornet fighter aircraft represented U.S. Navy aircraft.

== Reception ==
Burning Blue received mixed reviews from critics and audiences. While several mainstream outlets criticized its execution, others noted the film's sincerity and historical relevance, particularly within LGBTQ media.

In a more favorable review, Out magazine described the film as "a moving and important story that deserves to be told," praising its attempt to portray "the pain and courage required to live authentically within an institution that demands silence."

The Advocate noted that while the film may have flaws, "its ambition and historical subject matter make it a noteworthy entry in LGBTQ cinema."

Conversely, The New York Times criticized the film's dialogue and tone, calling it "a throwback in the worst sense," and the Los Angeles Times described it as "well-meaning but dramatically inert."

Despite the varied critical response, the film has found an audience among viewers interested in military-themed LGBTQ narratives and the legacy of the "Don't Ask, Don't Tell" era.

== In popular culture ==
American singer-songwriter Mariah the Scientist released a music video for her 2025 single "Burning Blue" that was inspired by the film.
