= D. M. W. Greer =

American playwright (born 1957)

D. M. W. Greer (born August 23, 1957) is an American playwright. He is the author of Burning Blue, written in 1992 and premiered at the King's Head Theatre on London's fringe in 1995.

== Early life ==
Born David Milne Willard III in Patuxent River, Maryland. His father, Daniel David Milne Willard, was a test pilot at the United States Naval Test Pilot School. His mother, Suzanne, daughter of Navy test pilot Seymour Anderson Johnson and Alice Virginia Kelley, was a homemaker. In 1965 his mother remarried Vice Admiral Howard E. Greer of Tyler, Texas, and the family moved to Yokosuka, Japan, where his stepfather was stationed with the Seventh Fleet. In 1968, stepfather Greer was Commanding Officer of the aircraft carrier U.S.S. Hancock which is now in the National Air and Space Museum.

After more than 20 different schools in 17 cities, Greer graduated from Radford High School in Honolulu, Hawaii, in 1975. He began his university education at the United States Naval Academy (Class of 1980) before bilging out and transferring to Oregon State University where he jumped ahead a year, made the Dean's List and earned a bachelor's degree in Architecture/Landscape on the same day he was commissioned an ensign in the Navy.

== The U.S. Navy ==
After reporting to Pensacola, Florida, for flight training Greer earned his wings in 1982 and reported to an anti-submarine warfare helicopter squadron in San Diego, California, where he flew the now obsolete Kaman SH-2 Seasprite.

In 1983 Greer was transferred to the Naval Information Office on Fifth Avenue in New York City where he was responsible for promoting the Navy to the major media outlets and assisted in the planning of the Statue of Liberty Centennial celebrations. In 1986 he left the U.S. Navy.

== Acting and other interests ==
Greer worked as a freelance graphic designer for various magazines and illustrated a couple of travel books (the Rum & Reggae series) for his friend, Jonathan Runge. For a time he worked for a multi-media production company and then managed the office of a small computer networking company in exchange for a sofa-bed to sleep on while he studied acting at The Orchard. After unexceptional performances in several off-off Broadway productions in New York, a small role in a Nantucket production of The Normal Heart and small roles in The Westport Country Playhouse production of A Few Good Men, he decided this was not his calling.

== 1990s and 2000s ==
In 1992 Greer wrote his first play, Burning Blue, which opened at The King's Head on London's fringe in 1995. West End producer, Robert Fox took it to The Theatre Royal, Haymarket, where the play received Evening Standard nominations and the production won two Olivier Awards for John Napier's set design and David Hersey's sound design. The play opened in Cape Town and then Johannesburg in 1996. Burning Blue then opened in Tel Aviv’s Beit Lessin Theatre where it also won critical praise and played to full houses for 18 months.

In 1998 John Hickok returned to the helm directing the American premiere in Los Angeles at the tiny Court Theatre. Kevin Otto (from the South Africa production) reprised his role as Lt. Dan Lynch, and Martin McDougall – who originated the role of Lt. JG Charlie Trumbo in London – returned to play the role again. They were joined by Tim DeKay as Lt. Will Stephensen, originally played by Irish Actor/Director Ian FitzGibbon in the London. Productions followed in San Francisco later that year and finally in New York in 2002.

A film version began production in 2010, and was premiered on June 6, 2014.

== 2000s ==
His second play, Alice Virginia, premiered in London in 2003 with Andrew Halliday and Amanda Boxer as the secondary leads and Susannah York playing the title role. In the same year, Greer directed the pilot episode of his six-part mockumentary, Ticket to Glory, a dark comedy about fame and misfortune. In 2005 he wrote a screen adaptation of Ibsen's Ghosts for United Media and collaborated with director, Ian FitzGibbon on Danny Boy, a romantic comedy about New Yorkers floundering and falling in love in Dublin.

In addition to his writing, Greer has been designing and renovating both commercial and residential spaces for the past 20 years. In 2005, his partner Andrew Halliday, joined the business full-time with the formation of HallidayGreer, a one-stop shopping design operation with high-end projects in New York, California, Miami and London. Their work has been published in London and New York.
