= Burning Blue =

1995 play by D.M.W. Greer

- Theatrical poster
- Original language: English
- Written by: D.M.W. Greer
- Characters: Lieutenant Daniel Lynch Lieutenant Matthew Blackwood; Lieutenant William Stephensen; Charlie "Boner" Trumbo; Special Agent John Cokely Admiral Lynch
- Genre: Drama
- Setting: United States, 1992

Premiere
- Date: 13 March 1995
- Place: The King's Head Theatre, London

Burning Blue is a 1995 American play written by D.M.W. Greer (born August 23, 1957), based on his experiences as a U.S. Navy aviator. Playwright Greer wrote about a U.S. Navy accident investigation which became a gay witch hunt during the "Don't Ask, Don't Tell" era.

== Background ==
In 1992, Greer wrote his first play, Burning Blue, based on his knowledge of events surrounding the treatment of gay servicemen in the U.S. Navy, which premiered at The King's Head Theatre on London’s fringe in 1995. The play opened to great critical acclaim. West End producer Robert Fox took it to The Theatre Royal, Haymarket, where the play received Evening Standard nominations and won two Olivier Awards: for John Napier's set design and David Hersey's sound design. The play opened in Cape Town and then Johannesburg in 1996.

Burning Blue then opened in Tel Aviv’s Beit Lessin Theatre, where it also won critical praise and played to full houses for 18 months. In 1998, John Hickok returned to direct the American premiere in Los Angeles at the Court Theatre, where it was an instant hit with the Los Angeles Times. Kevin Otto (from the South Africa production) reprised his role as Lieutenant Dan Lynch, and Martin McDougall – who originated the role of Lieutenant JG Charlie Trumbo in London – returned to play the role again. They were joined by Tim DeKay in the role of Lieutenant Will Stephensen, originally played by Irish actor and director Ian FitzGibbon in London. Productions followed in San Francisco later that year and finally in New York in 2002.

The film adaptation, starring Trent Ford and Rob Mayes and directed by Greer, began production in 2010. Released in 2014 as a feature film, it met with mixed critical reviews.

== Plot ==
Best friends Lieutenants Daniel Lynch and Will Stephensen are U.S. Navy fighter pilots flying the McDonnell Douglas F/A-18 Hornet, hoping to become the youngest pilots to be accepted into the space program. After two accidents, one of which is due to Will's failing eyesight, their unit is subject to an NCIS investigation led by John Cokely.

At the same time, a third pilot, Matt Blackwood, arrives on the carrier and quickly develops a close friendship with Dan, driving a wedge between Dan and Will. Cokely's investigation leads to him uncovering rumours about Dan and Matt's relationship just as they both begin to fall in love. When Matt decides to leave his wife and move in with Dan, there is a third accident and Cokely's investigation ramps up the pressure on Dan.

== Reception ==
Burning Blue received a range of responses from critics. Early productions in the United Kingdom and South Africa were largely well received. The play's London premiere at the King's Head Theatre in 1995 led to transfers to the Theatre Royal Haymarket and the Ambassadors Theatre. The West End production won two Olivier Awards for John Napier's set design and David Hersey's lighting design.

The South African productions in Cape Town and Johannesburg in 1996 were also positively reviewed, and the Tel Aviv staging at Beit Lessin Theatre enjoyed an 18-month run.

In the United States, reception was more mixed. The 1998 Los Angeles premiere at the Court Theatre was described as an "instant hit" by the Los Angeles Times.

However, some critics found the writing heavy-handed. Don Shewey, reviewing the play for The Advocate, wrote that it took "a Reefer Madness approach to homosexuality." Similarly, Dan Bacalzo of TheaterMania argued that the play "overstates its case without ever achieving the emotional depth that the topic merits."

A review on CurtainUp described the play as "eminently watchable" and praised its thriller-like structure, while also noting underdeveloped thematic strands and uneven pacing.

Although opinions varied, the play was frequently noted for its attempt to highlight the emotional toll of the U.S. military's “Don’t Ask, Don’t Tell” policy and the institutional challenges faced by LGBTQ service members.
