= Michelle Arthur =

American actress

Michelle Arthur is an English actress based in the United States. She has appeared in various television series, films, and video games. She is also known for her work with J. J. Abrams, appearing in Mission: Impossible III and episodes of Alias and Lost.

== Career ==
=== Film ===
She appeared as the Thorpe Sisters in the 1987 film adaptation of Jane Austen's novel Northanger Abbey. Arthur also appeared in the James Bond film GoldenEye (1995) as "Anna Nishkova". She has also appeared in the 1997 film Clockwatchers as "Dianne", in Seabiscuit (2003) as "Marcela's friend", in Steven Spielberg's The Terminal (2004). She also starred in the 2005 remake of Fun With Dick and Jane as Dick's secretary and in Mission: Impossible III (another collaboration with Abrams) as an airline worker. She appeared in the 2011 film Thin Ice.

=== Television ===
On television, Arthur has guest starred in shows such as Leap of Faith as "Claudia", four episodes of Alias as "Abigail" (a third Abrams collaboration), three episodes of Lost as "Michelle the flight attendant" (a fourth collaboration with Abrams), two episodes of The Big Bang Theory as "Mrs Petrescu" and one episode of Grey's Anatomy as "Brooke". She was set to appear in J. J. Abrams' television series The Catch as "Stella", before its cancellation by ABC. She was a regular cast member and writer on the comedy Head Case as Lola on the Starz network.

=== Voice work ===
Arthur has also lent her voice to several video games, including Armed & Dangerous, playing three characters - "Leper Boy", "Leper Woman" and "Lady of the Pond", as well as voicing characters in X-Men Legends (as Moira & Female Prisoner #3) and EverQuest II (as Smith Cayless Chambers, Merchant Tanaira and Vida Sweeps). She has also done the voice of Jote from Final Fantasy XII.

== Filmography ==
=== Film ===
Year	Title	Role	Notes
1995	GoldenEye	Anna	
1997	Clockwatchers	Diane	
2001	Free	Secretary	
2004	Seabiscuit	Marcela's Friend	
2004	The Terminal	Field Reporter	
2005	Fun with Dick and Jane	Dick's Secretary	
2006	Mission: Impossible III	Airline Worker	
2006	Happy Feet	Adélie Chica	Voice
2007	The Number 23	Sybil	
2007	Charlie Wilson's War	Refugee Camp Nurse	
2011	Thin Ice	Karla Gruenke	
2012	Battleship	British Newscaster	
2013	Saving Mr. Banks	Polly	
2016	Best Fake Friends	Rachel	

=== Television ===
Year	Title	Role	Notes
1987	Screen Two	Thorpe Sisters	Episode: "Northanger Abbey"
1998	Players	Doctor	Episode: "Mint Condition"
2002	Leap of Faith	Claudia	Episode: "The Balls Game"
2002	Alias	Abigail	4 episodes
2004–2005	Lost	Michelle	4 episodes
2005	Grey's Anatomy	Brooke	Episode: "Into You Like a Train"
2005	The Catch	Stella	Television film
2007–2009	Head Case	Lola Buckingham	28 episodes
2009	Terminator: The Sarah Connor Chronicles	Dana	Episode: "Some Must Watch While Some Must Sleep"
2011	Private Practice	Psychiatrist	Episode: "Two Steps Back"
2015	In-Between	Dean Haglund	Episode: "Murder"
2016–2018	The Big Bang Theory	Mrs. Petrescu	2 episodes
2018–2020	Mom	Belinda	2 episodes
2019	Station 19	British Woman Tenney	Episode: "Crazy Train"
2019–2020	Dirty John	—N/a	2 episodes
2022	The Villains of Valley View	Grandma (voice)	Episode: "Havoc-Ween"

=== Video games ===
Year	Title	Role	Source
2003	Armed and Dangerous	Leper Boy, Leper Woman, The Lady Of The Pond	
2004	X-Men Legends	Moira MacTaggert, Female Prisoner #3	
2004	EverQuest II	Smith Cayless Chambers, Merchant Tanaira, Vida Sweeps	
2006	Final Fantasy XII	Jote	
2012	Kingdoms of Amalur: Reckoning	Additional voices	
2013	Marvel Heroes	Valkyrie	
2014	The Elder Scrolls Online	Almalexia, Lyranth, Meridia, Additional voices	
2014	WildStar	Luminai Female	
2016	Uncharted 4: A Thief's End	Additional voices	
2017	The Elder Scrolls Online: Morrowind	Additional voices	
