= San Diego Film Critics Society =

Organization of film reviewers from San Diego-based publications

- Abbreviation: SDFCS
- Formation: 1997; 29 years ago
- Purpose: Film reviewers
- Location: San Diego, California, United States
- Website: www.sdfcs.org

The San Diego Film Critics Society (SDFCS) is an organization of film reviewers from San Diego–based publications that was founded in 1997.

== Overview ==
The San Diego Film Critics Society (SDFCS) is composed of print, television, radio and digital film critics working in San Diego County. According to the SDFCS, the mission of the society is to provide diverse critical opinion about movies, advance film education and awareness, and recognize excellence in cinema. The society holds several events each year to benefit local student filmmakers and provides provision of financial assistance for the academic pursuits of young filmmakers. The society also supports Film School Confidential, an annual festival held at the Museum of Photographic Arts in Balboa Park, presenting short films directed and produced by local student filmmakers. The events organized by the society often include screenings of excellent studio and independent films at various locations, many times featuring appearances by directors and actors involved in the film.

== SDFCS Award Ceremony ==
Each year, the society votes on the SDFCS Awards, which recognizes the best cinematic efforts of the year. This includes recognition of best film, actor, actress, director, cinematographer and numerous other categories. The voting results are published in film-related media worldwide, culminating in an annual awards banquet. Award nominations and winners are typically announced in the second week of December. In addition to the SDFCS Award, the organization presents an annual Career Award, Kyle Counts Award, and Special Award for an outstanding performer from that year. The Kyle Counts Award, named after the late San Diego film critic, recognizes a person or institution who is advancing film awareness, education and entertainment in the county.

== Awards ==
=== Categories ===
- Best Actor
- Best Actress
- Best Adapted Screenplay
- Best Animated Film
- Best Cinematography
- Best Comedic Performance
- Best Costume Design
- Best Director
- Best Documentary Film
- Best Editing
- Best Ensemble
- Best Film
- Best First Feature
- Best Foreign Language Film
- Best Original Screenplay
- Best Production Design
- Best Sound Design
- Best Stunt Choreography
- Best Supporting Actor
- Best Supporting Actress
- Best Use of Music
- Best Visual Effects
- Best Youth Performance

=== Award breakdown ===
(2 and more)

- 7 awards:
  - Nightcrawler (2014): Best Picture, Director, Actor, Original Screenplay, Supporting Actress, Cinematography, and Score
- 6 awards:
  - Inglourious Basterds (2009): Best Picture, Director, Supporting Actor, Original Screenplay, Ensemble Performance, and Score
  - Slumdog Millionaire (2008): Best Picture, Director, Adapted Screenplay, Cinematography, Editing, and Score
- 4 awards:
  - Argo (2012): Best Picture, Director, Adapted Screenplay, and Editing
  - No Country for Old Men (2007): Best Picture, Supporting Actor, Cast, and Cinematography
  - There Will Be Blood (2007): Best Director, Actor, Adapted Screenplay, and Score
  - Vera Drake (2004): Best Picture, Actress, Original Screenplay, and Supporting Actor
  - Ghost World (2001): Best Picture, Director, Actress, and Adapted Screenplay
  - Almost Famous (2000): Best Picture, Director, Original Screenplay, and Supporting Actress
  - American Beauty (1999): Best Picture, Actor, Actress, and Supporting Actress
- 3 awards:
  - Leave No Trace (2018): Best Picture, Director, and Breakthrough Artist
  - Capote (2005): Best Director, Actor, and Adapted Screenplay
  - Thirteen Conversations About One Thing (2002): Best Director, Original Screenplay, and Editing
- 2 awards:
  - Everything Everywhere All At Once (2022): Best Director and Editing
  - The Favourite (2018): Best Costume Design and Production Design
  - Game Night (2018): Best Editing and Ensemble
  - Baby Driver (2017): Best Editing and Use of Music
  - Get Out (2017): Best Picture and Original Screenplay
  - Lady Bird (2017): Best Director and Supporting Actress
  - The Perks of Being a Wallflower (2012): Best Supporting Actress and Ensemble Performance
  - Harry Potter and the Deathly Hallows – Part 2 (2011): Best Ensemble Performance and Score
  - A Single Man (2009): Best Actor and Score
  - The Wrestler (2008): Best Actor and Supporting Actress
  - Eternal Sunshine of the Spotless Mind (2004): Best Actor and Editing
  - Million Dollar Baby (2004): Best Director and Score
  - Dirty Pretty Things (2003): Best Picture and Actor
  - The Lord of the Rings: The Return of the King (2003): Best Director and Production Design
  - Far from Heaven (2002): Best Picture and Actress
  - Gladiator (2000): Best Actor and Cinematography

== Award ceremonies ==
- 1996: 1st San Diego Film Critics Society Awards
- 1997: 2nd San Diego Film Critics Society Awards
- 1998: 3rd San Diego Film Critics Society Awards
- 1999: 4th San Diego Film Critics Society Awards
- 2000: 5th San Diego Film Critics Society Awards
- 2001: 6th San Diego Film Critics Society Awards
- 2002: 7th San Diego Film Critics Society Awards
- 2003: 8th San Diego Film Critics Society Awards
- 2004: 9th San Diego Film Critics Society Awards
- 2005: 10th San Diego Film Critics Society Awards
- 2006: 11th San Diego Film Critics Society Awards
- 2007: 12th San Diego Film Critics Society Awards
- 2008: 13th San Diego Film Critics Society Awards
- 2009: 14th San Diego Film Critics Society Awards
- 2010: 15th San Diego Film Critics Society Awards
- 2011: 16th San Diego Film Critics Society Awards
- 2012: 17th San Diego Film Critics Society Awards
- 2013: 18th San Diego Film Critics Society Awards
- 2014: 19th San Diego Film Critics Society Awards
- 2015: 20th San Diego Film Critics Society Awards
- 2016: 21st San Diego Film Critics Society Awards
- 2017: 22nd San Diego Film Critics Society Awards
- 2018: 23rd San Diego Film Critics Society Awards
- 2019: 24th San Diego Film Critics Society Awards
- 2020: 25th San Diego Film Critics Society Awards
- 2021: 26th San Diego Film Critics Society Awards
- 2022: 27th San Diego Film Critics Society Awards
- 2023: 28th San Diego Film Critics Society Awards
- 2024: 29th San Diego Film Critics Society Awards
- 2025: 30th San Diego Film Critics Society Awards

== See also ==
- List of film awards
