= Deserted (film) =

- Theatrical release poster
- Directed by: Ashley Avis
- Written by: Ashley Avis
- Produced by: Edward Winters; Ashley Avis; Keith A. Fox; Larry Hummel
- Starring: Mischa Barton; Trent Ford; Lance Henriksen; Jake Busey; Dana Rosendorff; Jackson Davis; Kelly Brannigan; Winter Ave Zoli
- Cinematography: Garrett O'Brien
- Edited by: Douglas Crise
- Music by: Luigi Pulcini
- Production company: Winterstone Pictures
- Distributed by: Invincible Pictures
- Release dates: October 6, 2016 (VOD Release); February 28, 2017 (United States)
- Running time: 96 minutes
- Country: United States
- Language: English

Deserted is a 2016 American psychological thriller film written and directed by Ashley Avis and starring Mischa Barton, Trent Ford (in his final film role before he retired from acting), Winter Ave Zoli, Jackson Davis, Kelly Brannigan, Lance Henriksen, Jake Busey, Gerry Bednob and Dana Rosendorff.

The plot focuses on when twenty-four-year-old Jae (Barton) is released from prison and returns to her childhood home in small-town Ridgecrest. Once reunited with her brother, (Davis), she joins him and some friends on a road trip to a music festival in Death Valley, resulting in them getting hopelessly lost and fighting to survive the elements. The film was written by Avis. It premiered in October, 2016 at The Crest Theater formerly known as Majestic Crest Theater."

The film was released by Invincible Pictures on February 28, 2017.

== Plot ==
In Ridgecrest, California, twenty-four year old Jae, (Barton) is released from prison for murdering her mother 7 years prior. She is reunited with her older brother, Robin (Davis) at their childhood home and finds herself quickly wanting to escape the bad memories that still preside there.

When Jae discovers that Robin will soon be leaving town to go to Burn the Moon, a desert music festival in Death Valley, with his girlfriend Rosemary (Zoli) and her friends Heather (Rosendorff) and Jasmine (Kelly Brannigan), she said she'll tag along.

Once the group is on the road, the car breaks down in the middle of nowhere. A good samaritan, Clay (Busey) tows the car to the local mechanic, Archer (Sebastian Bach) who informs them, that the car will take at least 2 days to fix. While waiting at a local bar being served by Lizard (Gerry Bednob) some guys- Troy (Ford), Dax (Michael Milford) and Wade (Tyler Sellers) who stopped at the mechanic for gas and a drink, also on their way to the festival, offer to take the group along with them. Eventually they all head off together for the festival in the boys RV.

As they head toward Death Valley they accidentally take a wrong turn in the darkness, and have no choice but to set up camp for the night. The group experiments with peyote, Jae and Troy have a semi-romantic tryst and Jasmine, unbeknownst to the others, accidentally kills the battery in the RV, while playing with the headlights when high.

In the morning, they wake up to find that Rosemary is dead - assumed to have overdosed on the peyote or to have had some kind of bad reaction. The RV is now stranded, they have no cell reception and are completely lost. They have no choice but to take off on foot, leaving Rosemary's body behind in the RV.

Things then continue to get progressively worse for the group. Over the course of the following 72 hours Wade gets bitten by a rattle snake and can no longer continue on with the group. Dax stays behind to look after Wade, until he eventually dies. Tensions start to rise between Robin and Troy until Robin decides that they will have a better chance of survival if he takes off alone in search of help.

A huge sandstorm then hits the group which suffocates and kills Jasmine. Now alone, Dax - though having survived the sandstorm, sees no way out and jumps off a cliff face, committing suicide. Soon, Jae and Heather separate from Troy and eventually Heather dies from dehydration.

In the end, a helicopter soon finds Robin and it is assumed that he is rescued. Jae finally finds a road and is picked up by a passing family. And at the very end of the film, after the credits have run, we see that Troy stumbles upon the 'Burn The Moon' festival, now over and done with.

== Cast ==
- Mischa Barton as Jae
- Jackson Davis as Robin
- Winter Ave Zoli as Rosemary
- Trent Ford as Troy
- Dana Rosendorff as Heather
- Michael Milford as Dax
- Kelly Brannigan as Jasmine
- Tyler Sellers as Wade
- Lance Henriksen as Hopper
- Jake Busey as Clay
- Sebastian Bach as Archer
- Gerry Bednob as "Lizard"
- Heidi James as Calico
- Dawn Vicknair as Holly
- Alfred Rubin Thompson as Officer
- Annunziata Gianzero as Barmaid
- Jeffrey S. Levine as Bar Patron
- Ed Magik as Bar Patron
- Juan Vasquez as Bar Patron
- Aleena Wagner as Rescue Kid
- Dylan Wagner as Rescue Kid

== Reception ==
Jennie Kermode wrote in her review for Rotten Tomatoes and 'Eye For Film': "Though it falls short of its aspirations as a character-driven thriller, Deserted is certainly effective as a cautionary tale, and it shows that the increasingly busy Barton is worth keeping an eye on." David Duprey wrote in his review in 'That Moment In': "Avis challenges us by stripping away action and creating something more character-driven and while not every relationship and encounter feels always authentic, there is a lot here that will give enthusiasts for the genre much to think about."

Emilie Black, a film critic, for 'Cinema Crazed' summed up Deserted as, "less about surviving in the desert after being lost and more about discovery or rediscovery of self and the importance of family and friends in the face of tragedy and desperation." Phil Wheat, a film critic for 'Nerdly.co.uk' writes "Ultimately Deserted is one heavy-handed metaphor for forgiveness and inner strength: Barton’s character gets over her past by literally fighting her way through the unforgiving desert as one would normally fight your personal demons."

With Ben Wilkins Academy Award winner for Best Sound for the film Whiplash behind sound design for Deserted the film has seen four nominations in this department including 2017 Jerry Goldsmith Awards Nominated BSO Spirit, 2016 Hollywood Music in Media Awards Nominated HMMA Award, 2016 Music + Sound Awards, International Nominated Best Original Composition and 2015 Hollywood Music in Media Awards Nominated Best Original Score - Trailer."
