= Gerry Bednob =

Actor and comedian

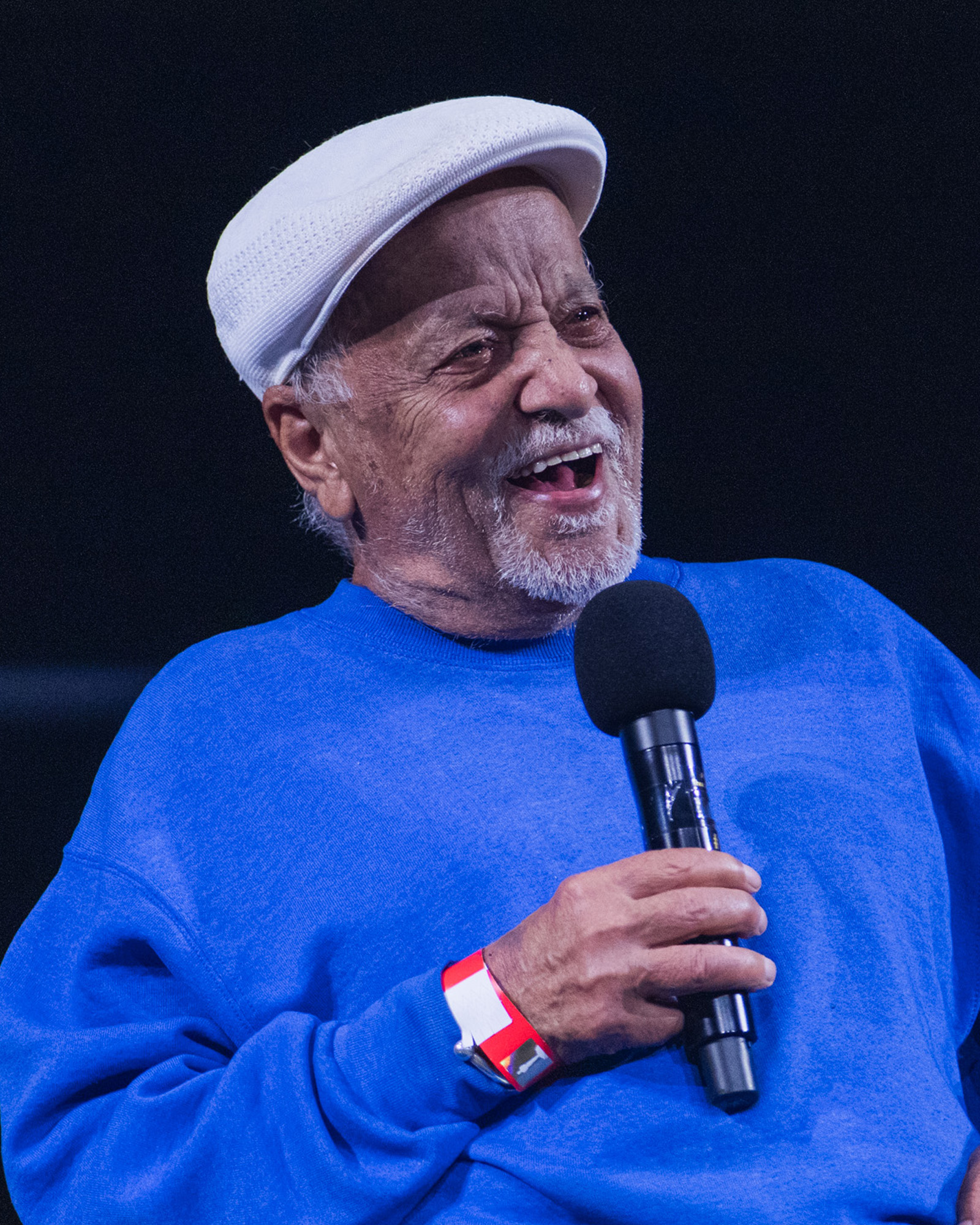
- Bednob in 2025
- Born: Gerald Baldeo; 1935 or 1936 (age 90–91); Trinidad and Tobago
- Education: University of Toronto
- Occupations: Actor; comedian
- Years active: 1970s–present
- Website: gerrybednob.net

Gerald Baldeo (born 1935 or 1936), known professionally as Gerry Bednob, is a Trinidadian-American comedian and actor.

== Biography ==
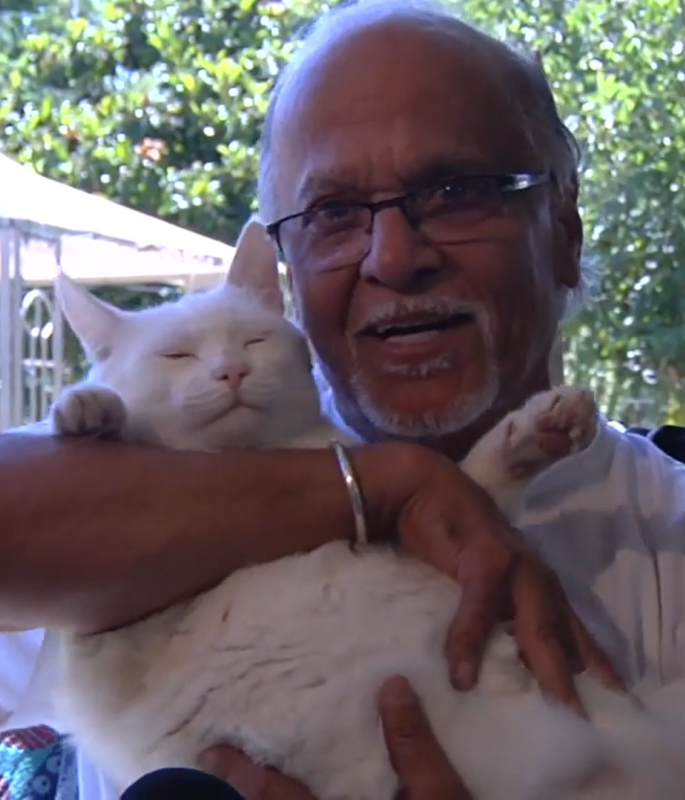
Bednob in 2011

Bednob was born in Trinidad and Tobago and is of Indian descent. In his standup acts, Bednob often refers to himself as Bangladeshi, as his grandfather was from a part of East Bengal in British India that is now in present-day Bangladesh. He moved to Canada in 1963, later graduating from the University of Toronto with a bachelor's degree in sociology. He worked as a high school counselor before turning to stand-up comedy, taking his stage name—which he initially used to disguise his comedy career from his employer—from the film Bedknobs and Broomsticks. After spending two years honing his skills at Yuk Yuk's comedy club in Toronto, Bednob moved to Los Angeles in the late 1970s, eventually becoming an American citizen.

Bednob has co-starred as "Bling Bling Shelton" in the VH1 comedy series Free Radio and recurred on shows such as Wilfred, Playing House, and Undeclared. He has appeared in films The 40-Year-Old Virgin, Furry Vengeance, Encino Man, Zack and Miri Make a Porno, The Five-Year Engagement, and Walk Hard.

== Filmography ==
Year	Title	Role	Notes
1992	The Wonder Years	Maharishi	1 episode
1992	Encino Man	Kashmir	
1993	Seinfeld	Babu's friend	1 episode
1994	Monkey Trouble	Mr. Rao aka Pet	
1996	Don't Quit Your Day Job	Gupta Chandi	Video game
1997	Mad About You	Cabbie #2	1 episode
2001–2002	Undeclared	Mr. Burundi	2 episodes
2002	Friday After Next	Moly's Father	
2005	The 40-Year-Old Virgin	Mooj	
2007	Walk Hard: The Dewey Cox Story	The Maharishi	
2007	Brutal Massacre: A Comedy	Hanu Vindepeshs	
2007	Americanizing Shelley	Priest	
2007	George Lopez	Mr. Gidwani	1 episode
2008	The Golden Door	Cabbie	
2008	Witless Protection	Omar	
2008	Kissing Cousins	Mr. K	
2008–2009	Free Radio	Bling Bling Shelton	
2008	Zack and Miri Make a Porno	Mr. Surya	
2008	Shades of Ray	Naseem Khaliq	
2009	Lonely Street	Bongo	
2009	Why Am I Doing This?	Ajay	
2010	Furry Vengeance	Mr. Gupta	
2011	Honey 2	Mr. Kapoor	
2011	Caught	Convenience Store Owner	
2011	Politics of Love	Vijay Gupta	
2011	The Lie	Radko	
2011–2013	Wilfred	Mr. Patel	6 episodes
2011	The Cynical Life of Harper Hall	Rajit	3 episodes
2012	Lizzie	Jared	
2012	The Five-Year Engagement	Pakistani Chef	
2014–2017	Playing House	Mr. Nanjiani	7 episodes
2016	The Bet	Bob	
2016	Deserted	Lizard	
2021	Barb and Star Go to Vista Del Mar	Rick	
2022	Bury Me	Raj	
2022	Off-Time	Raj	
2023	Pet Shop Days		
2024	Mr. Blue Shirt: The Inspiration	Raki the Great	
