= Trent Ford =

American born English actor and model

- Born: Trent Manley Ford; Akron, Ohio, U.S.
- Occupations: Actor, Model
- Years active: 2000–2016

Trent Ford is an American-born English actor and model.

== Early life and education ==
Ford was born in Akron, Ohio. His father was a test pilot for the United States Navy, and his mother was a British Airways head stewardess from Birmingham, West Midlands. His parents met in Kuwait. He moved to the United Kingdom at the age of one with his parents and grew up in Cradley, West Midlands and Malvern, Worcestershire with his brother and two sisters. He studied English and economics at Clare College, Cambridge.

== Career ==
Ford starred in the films Deeply (with Kirsten Dunst), Gosford Park, Slap Her... She's French (released in the U.S. as She Gets What She Wants), How to Deal (with Mandy Moore), and September Dawn (opposite Jon Voight). Ford portrayed Jean-Paul de Bourbon, the French boyfriend of Zoey Bartlet (Elisabeth Moss) in six episodes of the fourth season of the television drama The West Wing, and Superman's future enemy, Mr. Mxyzptlk, in the fourth season episode of Smallville titled "Jinx". He appeared as Steve in one episode of the FOX/WB sitcom Grounded for Life opposite Donal Logue and Megyn Price. He also played Benjamin Chow, the boyfriend of Kat Warbler (Lizzy Caplan's character), in five episodes of the CBS sitcom The Class. In the first season of the NBC series Life, he played Jeffrey Farmer opposite Damian Lewis.

Ford was the leading man in the global advertising campaign for the Calvin Klein perfume Eternity Moment opposite Scarlett Johansson, shot by Peter Lindbergh. Ford has also appeared in advertising campaigns for Gap, Abercrombie & Fitch, and Valentino.

In 2008, Ford starred in the love story/thriller Rez Bomb about a Lakota girl and a white boy who are very much in love but get themselves into trouble with a brutal money lender.

Ford played a vampire named Trevor in three episodes of The CW supernatural drama The Vampire Diaries. In November 2011, Ford appeared in one episode of the CW drama 90210. In March 2012, Ford filmed J. J. Abrams' CW TV pilot Shelter, portraying a British rock star named Tyler Dean.

In May 2012, Ford played the lead role, Alex, in a short film titled Shoot'er, opposite Nikki Sixx, directed by P.R. Brown.

On September 29, 2013, Ford appeared in the Season 6 premiere episode of The Mentalist on CBS.

Ford starred in Burning Blue, a military drama about two Navy fighter pilots who find themselves in the midst of a forbidden relationship, throwing their lives and careers into disarray. Lionsgate released the film on June 6, 2014.

On August 6, 2014, Sixx:A.M. premiered their music video for the single "Gotta Get It Right" off their Modern Vintage album, featuring Ford.

Ford starred with Mischa Barton in Deserted, a thriller about a road trip to Death Valley that results in getting hopelessly lost in the most stunning yet unforgiving topographical terrain on the planet.

Ford starred in Superior, a short film about a stranger passing through town who sparks a teenage girl's desire to distinguish herself from her identical twin sister. The film premiered at Sundance Film Festival on January 23, 2015.

== Personal life ==
Ford has been in a relationship with American actress and model Natalie Cohen since March 2011.

== Filmography ==
Film
Year	Title	Role	Notes
2000	Deeply	James	
2001	Gosford Park	Jeremy Blond	
2002	She Gets What She Wants	Ed Mitchell	
2003	How to Deal	Macon Forrester	
2005	The Island	Calvin Klein Model	
2006	Park	Nathan	
2006	Shark Bait	Percy (voice)	
2007	September Dawn	Jonathan Samuelson	
2008	Rez Bomb	Scott	
2012	Shoot'er	Shoot'er	
2012	Possessions	Orlando	
2013	Platypus the Musical	Daniel	
2014	Burning Blue	Daniel Lynch	
2015	Superior	Joe	
2016	Deserted	Troy	

Television
Year	Title	Role	Notes
2002–2003	The West Wing	Jean-Paul Pierre Claude Charpentier, Vicomte de Bourbon	6 Episodes
2004	Smallville	Mikhail Mxyzptlk	Episode: "Jinx"
2004	Grounded for Life	Steve	Episode: "Do Ya Think I'm Sexy?"
2007	The Class	Benjamin Chow	5 Episodes
2007	Life	Jeffrey Farmer	Episode: "A Civil War"
2010–2011	The Vampire Diaries	Trevor	3 Episodes
2011	90210	Fashion Design Instructor	Episode: "Project Runaway"
2012	Shelter	Tyler Dean	Main Cast, CW TV Pilot
2013	The Mentalist	Gavin Yardley	Episode: "The Desert Rose"
