= Clockwatchers =

1997 film by Jill Sprecher

- Theatrical release poster
- Directed by: Jill Sprecher
- Written by: Jill Sprecher; Karen Sprecher
- Produced by: Gina Resnick
- Starring: Toni Collette; Parker Posey; Lisa Kudrow; Alanna Ubach; Paul Dooley
- Cinematography: Jim Denault
- Edited by: Stephen Mirrione
- Music by: Mader; Joey Altruda
- Production company: Goldcrest Films International
- Distributed by: BMG Independents
- Release dates: June 12, 1997 (Australia); May 15, 1998 (United States)
- Running time: 96 minutes
- Country: United States
- Language: English
- Box office: $537,948

Clockwatchers is a 1997 American comedy-drama film co-written and directed by Jill Sprecher. It stars Toni Collette, Parker Posey, Lisa Kudrow, and Alanna Ubach as temporary office staffers in an office complex. The four become misfit friends in an office environment where they are ignored and mistrusted by their co-workers.

== Plot ==
Iris Chapman is a timid young woman who takes a temporary job at Global Credit, a credit company. She soon befriends assertive and cynical fellow temp Margaret Burrell, who teaches Iris the many ways to deal with the crummy world of temping. She introduces Iris to two other temps: aspiring actress Paula eagerly awaits post-work happy hours and the chance to flirt with attractive men; and naive Jane, who is engaged to marry Derrick, a man who makes up for his abusive behavior by buying her gifts. The four temps forge a camaraderie based on being outsiders at the company.

Margaret is upset when a strange newcomer named Cleo is hired as a permanent employee after one day. Margaret hopes to become an executive assistant to stressed-out manager Milton Lasky but her goals are thwarted when he dies of a heart attack. Margaret confides to Iris that her time as a temp will have been worthwhile if she can get a good letter of recommendation.

A series of thefts occur in the office and suspicion falls on the temps, particularly Margaret. While walking one day, Iris and Margaret spot Derrick with another woman but do not do anything about it. At Jane's bridal shower, Iris and Margaret confide in Paula, who argues with Margaret, saying that marriage is important to some people. Iris' plastic toy monkey goes missing and when she sees it inside of Margaret's desk, Iris loses her faith in Margaret.

As the office thefts continue, the women are put under more and more stress which strains their friendship, as all their shoddy desks are put into a fishbowl-type area and they are spied on and searched by the office security guards. Iris finds Paula vomiting in the bathroom on their lunch break. Paula tells Iris she thinks she may be pregnant but later tells her it was a false alarm. Margaret explains to Iris that Paula typically lies about booking acting roles in order to make herself seem better, while Paula makes it clear she believes Margaret is the office thief.

Eventually, Margaret proposes a one-day strike from work due to mistreatment and being underappreciated as temps and her friends halfheartedly agree to join her but none of them follow through and she is fired by HR manager Barbara Mitchell when she returns. Margaret calls out for support but none of her friends or co-workers say anything as she is escorted out of the building. Iris regretfully discovers that Margaret did not steal her plastic monkey while she is cleaning out the desk and finds Margaret's identical trinket.

The friendship between the temps dissolves, as Jane left the company to get married and Paula was transferred to the accounting department. After moving to another desolate temp desk, Iris throws out a picture she took during a night out with Margaret, Paula and Jane. She also receives a rejection letter from a job she had applied to at another company and is left with no other options but to keep temping.

When Iris spots Cleo stealing a few items from a senior executive's desk, she follows her home and is surprised to see Cleo lives in a mansion. She angrily leaves Cleo a note at work demanding her stolen notebook back; Cleo fishes it out of her purse and hands it to her. At lunch, Iris burns the notebook (which Cleo had drawn inside) in front of Cleo. Cleo later leaves a brand-new notebook on Iris' desk with the words "I'm sorry" written inside its first page.

Iris decides to leave Global Credit. On her last day, Mr. MacNamee, a pleasant but distant senior executive agrees to sign a glowing pre-written letter of recommendation for her, which contains Margaret's name and achievements. Iris then mails the letter of recommendation to Margaret and resolves that she will no longer be the passive person that she used to be.

== Cast ==
- Toni Collette as Iris Chapman
- Parker Posey as Margaret Burrell
- Lisa Kudrow as Paula
- Alanna Ubach as Jane
- Helen Fitzgerald as Cleo
- Stanley DeSantis as Art
- Jamie Kennedy as Eddie Pope
- David James Elliott as Mr. MacNamee
- Debra Jo Rupp as Barbara Mitchell
- Kevin Cooney as Mr. Kilmer
- Bob Balaban as Milton Lasky
- Paul Dooley as Bud Chapman
- Scott Mosenson as Jack Shoberg
- Joshua Malina as Global Credit Receptionist
- O-Lan Jones as Madame Debbie
- Joe Chrest as Detective
- Michelle Arthur as Diane
- Sully Díaz as Waitress
- Jim Wise as Man in Bar
- Jaime Gomez as Derrick
- Terri Hoyos as Female Executive
- Shauna Wilson as Louise

== Release ==
The film was first released on June 12, 1997 in Australia, the native country of Toni Collette. In the United States, it was released nearly a year later on May 15, 1998.

== Reception ==
=== Critical response ===
Clockwatchers received generally positive reviews from critics. On Rotten Tomatoes, the film holds an approval rating of 87% based on 31 reviews, with an average rating of 6.9/10. Metacritic, which uses a weighted average, assigned the film a score of 64 out of 100, based on 19 critics, indicating "generally favorable" reviews.

In a positive review, Roger Ebert wrote that Clockwatchers is "a rare film about the way people actually live", "the kind of movie that can change lives", and awarded it three-and-a-half out of four stars. In a negative review, Owen Gleiberman of Entertainment Weekly called the film "as empty of drive and imagination as its poor-little-victim heroines, who never seem more than sulky, overgrown high school girls".

=== Accolades ===
Year	Award	Category	Result
1997	Torino International Festival of Young Cinema	Best Feature Film	Won
1997	Sundance Film Festival	Grand Jury Prize Dramatic	Nominated
1998	Arizona International Film Festival	Audience Award, Most Popular Indie Film	Won
