= Thirteen Conversations About One Thing =

2001 film by Jill Sprecher

- Theatrical release poster
- Directed by: Jill Sprecher
- Written by: Karen Sprecher; Jill Sprecher
- Produced by: Beni Tadd Atoori; Gina Resnick
- Starring: Matthew McConaughey; Alan Arkin; John Turturro; Clea DuVall; Amy Irving
- Cinematography: Dick Pope
- Edited by: Stephen Mirrione
- Music by: Alex Wurman
- Distributed by: Sony Pictures Classics
- Release dates: September 2, 2001 (Venice Film Festival); May 24, 2002 (United States)
- Running time: 104 minutes
- Country: United States
- Language: English
- Budget: $3 million
- Box office: $3.7 million

Thirteen Conversations About One Thing is a 2001 American drama film directed by Jill Sprecher. The screenplay by Sprecher and her sister Karen focuses on five seemingly disparate individuals in search of happiness whose paths intersect in ways that unexpectedly affect their lives.

== Plot ==
The film is divided into 13 vignettes, each prefaced by an aphorism. Set in New York City, the story revolves around ambitious district attorney Troy, who is stricken with guilt following a hit and run accident in which he injures Beatrice, an idealistic cleaning woman who, forced to reassess her life during her recuperation, finds herself thinking more like her cynical co-worker Dorrie. Mid-level insurance claims manager Gene, unable to cope with his son's downward spiral into drug addiction, is rankled by an unrelentingly cheerful staff member and suffers pangs of regret after firing him without just cause. College physics professor Walker, trying to cope with a midlife crisis, becomes romantically involved with a colleague, an infidelity his wife Patricia is forced to face when his wallet, stolen in a mugging, is mailed to their home and she discovers incriminating evidence inside it.

== Cast ==
- Matthew McConaughey as Troy
- John Turturro as Walker
- Clea DuVall as Beatrice
- Alan Arkin as Gene
- Amy Irving as Patricia
- Tia Texada as Dorrie
- Richard E. Council as Del

== Production ==
The Sprecher sisters scripted Thirteen Conversations About One Thing over the course of eight weeks. The script was completed before Jill's directorial debut Clockwatchers was released in 1997, but due to a lack of funding the film took over three years to make. The plot was inspired in part by events in Jill Sprecher's life, including two muggings and a subway assault. The character of Beatrice is based on Sprecher's experiences when she moved to Manhattan following college graduation: "Clea Duvall's character is very autobiographical ... I was that person who only saw good things around me and then, of course, after getting mugged, I sort of changed my opinion of human beings."

The film premiered at the 2001 Venice Film Festival and was shown at the Toronto International Film Festival, the MIFED (Mercato internazionale del film e del documentario) Film Market in Italy, the 2002 Sundance Film Festival, the Hong Kong International Film Festival, the San Francisco International Film Festival and the Wisconsin Film Festival before going into limited release in the United States. There, it opened on nine screens, earning $89,499 and ranking #34 on its opening weekend. It eventually grossed $3,288,164 in the US and $418,488 in foreign markets for a total worldwide box office of $3,706,652.

== Reception ==
Review aggregator website Rotten Tomatoes reported that 83% of 114 critics gave the film a positive review, with an average rating of 7.3/10. The site's critics consensus states: "Thirteen Conversations About One Thing is an intelligent and poignant look at lives intersecting." Metacritic, which uses a weighted average, assigned the film a score of 74 out of 100, based on 26 critics, indicating "generally favorable" reviews.

Thirteen Conversations About One Thing was generally well received by critics, who praised the quality of the cast and the treatment of the film's themes. Roger Ebert described the movie as "brilliant ... It is philosophy, illustrated through everyday events." A. O. Scott of the New York Times called the film "both straightforward and enigmatic" and said that "the quiet naturalism of the acting balances the artifice of the script and the almost finicky precision of Ms. Sprecher's frames". For Scott, the film is "thrillingly smart, but not, like so many other pictures in this vein, merely an elaborate excuse for its own cleverness. As you puzzle over the intricacies of its shape, which reveal themselves only in retrospect, you may also find yourself surprised by the depth of its insights." Houston Chronicle reviewer Eric Harrison called the film an "intricately devised and thoughtful comedy", while San Francisco Chronicle reviewer Mick LaSalle said it "makes a case for cinema as a vehicle for conveying moods and ideas and, hardest of all, the internal movements of a soul."

Negative reviewers wrote that the film had problems of tone and a lack of depth to its philosophical underpinnings. Peter Bradshaw of The Guardian awarded the film two out of five stars and commented that the film "suffers from curate's-egg unevenness, though its good points certainly stick in the mind." According to Entertainment Weekly critic Ty Burr, the film has "luminous performances, but a genteel tone of despair drags the whole thing down". The Village Voice's Jessica Winter said "the film succeeds only when it peers up from the intro-philosophy book for the occasional glimpse of everyday beauty".

== Awards ==
- Boston Society of Film Critics Award for Best Supporting Actor (Alan Arkin, winner)
- Florida Film Critics Circle Award for Best Ensemble (winner)
- San Diego Film Critics Society Award for Best Director (winner)
- San Diego Film Critics Society Award for Best Original Screenplay (winner)
- San Diego Film Critics Society Award for Best Editing (winner)
