= Jill Sprecher =

American film director, producer and writer

- Born: July 27, 1957 (age 69); United States
- Occupations: film director, producer, writer
- Parent: Pete Sprecher (father) Phyllis Sprecher (mother)
- Relatives: Karen Sprecher (sister) Jeffrey Sprecher (brother)

Jill Ann Sprecher (born July 27, 1957) is an American film director, producer, and writer. Sprecher collaborates on her film projects with her sister, Karen Sprecher, who writes. She is known for her films Clockwatchers and Thirteen Conversations About One Thing and her contributions to Big Love on HBO. Her films feature stories about realistic human experiences and the struggles of women.

== Biography ==
Jill Sprecher grew up in Madison, Wisconsin, with her two siblings and parents, Peter, an insurance broker, and Phyllis (née Willingham) Sprecher, a medical technologist. Depending on where Pete found insurance jobs, the family moved between Madison and Milwaukee. The children attended Memorial High School.

Jill studied literature and philosophy at the University of Wisconsin. Jill moved to New York the day after she graduated to study film and begin her career in the industry. She graduated from New York University with a Masters in cinema studies.

In New York, Jill experienced two muggings. She required brain surgery after the second instance. Despite the trauma and injury, she chose to remain in New York, instead of returning home to Wisconsin. A year after the surgery, she was hit on the head while riding the subway. In tears, she looked up to see another passenger smiling at her, which renewed her belief that not all strangers were bad people. This event inspired the climactic scene in Thirteen Conversations About One Thing.

Jill's brother, Jeffrey Sprecher, is the CEO and chairman of Intercontinental Exchange, which acquired the parent company of the New York Stock Exchange in 2013.

Now, both Jill and her sister, Karen Sprecher, reside in Southern California. In Los Angeles, they offer their services as writers-for-hire.

== Career ==
After moving to New York, to afford the rent and support herself while she was in school, Sprecher took on temp jobs. Eventually, she began to find small jobs within the film industry, including positions as a production coordinator and production assistant.

Despite only having a masters of social work, Jill hired Karen, her sister, as an assistant production coordinator. The two began writing Clockwatchers in their spare time.

In 1997, Sprecher's first film, Clockwatchers, starring Lisa Kudrow, premiered at the Sundance Film Festival. The deadpan comedy portrayed the frustrating realities that women experience while working temp jobs. It won international prizes including the title of Best Feature Film at the Torino International Festival of Young Cinema.

Due to the financial instability of the independent film community, Sprecher's second film, Thirteen Conversations About One Thing, starring Matthew McConaughey, took four years to get made. The film was meant to present realistic human experiences and stories of human connection. A female audience member fainted at the premiere and McConaughey assisted the woman in coming-to, mimicking the climax of the film.

For five years, Sprecher served as a judge for CableACE Awards.

There was a ten-year gap between the releases of Thirteen Conversations About One Thing and Thin Ice.

Sprecher is credited with producing eleven episodes of Big Love. She also wrote one episode titled "A Barbecue for Betty".

All of the films produced by Jill and Karen Sprecher began as screenplays that they co-wrote.

== Style ==
Jill Sprecher’s films have been compared to modernist literature due to their common themes of subjectivity and constructionism. Sprecher also makes references to literature throughout her films. Additionally, she often employs non-linear narratives. Within the film Thirteen Conversations About One Thing, sequences are edited to foreshadow upcoming scenes, or reference or repeat past scenes from a different vantage point.

The films created by Jill Sprecher follow contemporary independent filmmaking tropes, through their casting of notable stars, low budget, minimalist sets, and emotional themes.

Jill Sprecher often uses her personal experiences as inspiration and incorporates them into her films. It has been speculated that Jill’s characters are based on herself and that the characters, Dorrie and Beatrice in her second film, Thirteen Conversations About One Thing are fictionalized representations of Jill and Karen. Both sets of sisters held temp office jobs and are very close. Also Jill, like Beatrice, suffered head injuries after being hit with a bottle and then was assaulted on the subway.

== Filmography ==
Year	Title	Director	Writer	Producer	Notes
1997	Clockwatchers	Yes	Yes	No	
2001	Thirteen Conversations About One Thing	Yes	Yes	No	
2006	Big Love	No	Yes	Yes	
2011	Thin Ice (formerly "The Convincer")	Yes	Yes	No	

== Awards ==
Year	Work	Award	Result
1997	Clockwatchers	Best Feature Film, Torino International Festival of Young Cinema	Won
1997	Clockwatchers	Grand Jury Prize, Dramatic, Sundance Film Festival	Nominated
1998	Clockwatchers	Audience Award, Most Popular Indie Film, Arizona International Film Festival	Won
2002	Thirteen Conversations About One Thing	Best Original Screenplay, San Diego Film Critics Society Awards	Won
2002	Thirteen Conversations About One Thing	Best Director, San Diego Film Critics Society Awards	Won
2003	Thirteen Conversations About One Thing	Best Screenplay, Film Independent Spirit Awards	Nominated
2003	Thirteen Conversations About One Thing	Best Original Screenplay, Chlotrudis Awards	Nominated
