= Naomi Watts filmography =

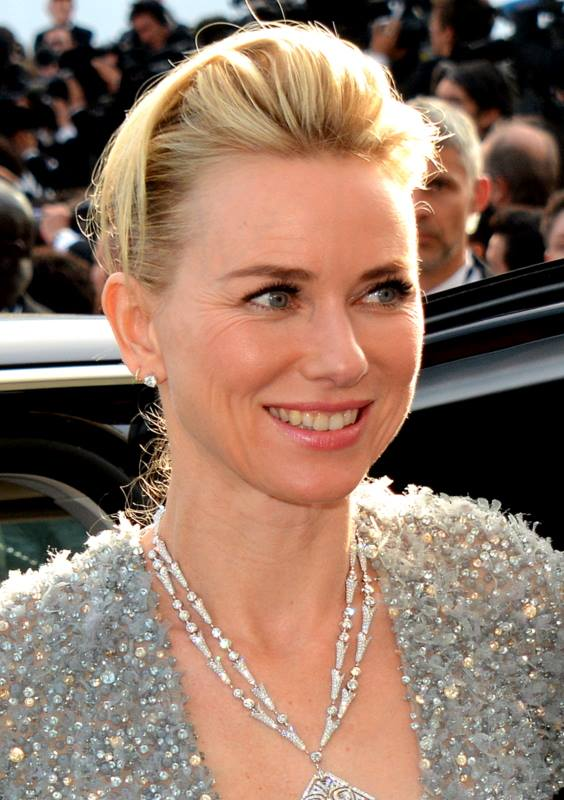
Watts at the 2015 Cannes Film Festival

Naomi Watts is a British actress and producer known for her work in Australian and American film, television and video games. Watts emigrated with her family to Australia from the UK at the age of 14, and made her debut in the 1986 Australian film For Love Alone. She then pursued a brief career in the fashion industry, first as a model and later as a fashion editor. After attending a drama workshop, Watts quit her editing job and pursued acting as a career. She appeared in the sitcom Hey Dad..! (1990), and the soap opera Home and Away (1991). Her first lead role was in the 1993 thriller Gross Misconduct, where Watts played a student who seduces her teacher, and then accuses him of rape.

She transitioned to Hollywood productions in the mid to late 1990s starring in the science fiction film Tank Girl (1995), horror film Children of the Corn IV: The Gathering (1996), and biographical drama Dangerous Beauty (1998). Watts played an aspiring actress in David Lynch's neo-noir film Mulholland Drive (2001), which was her breakthrough role and garnered her international recognition. She then starred as journalist Rachel Keller in the horror remake The Ring (2002), and reprised the role in its sequel The Ring Two (2005). Watts portrayed a grief-stricken mother with a history of substance abuse in the Alejandro González Iñárritu-directed 21 Grams (2003), for which she garnered nominations for Best Actress at the Academy Awards, British Academy Film Awards, and Screen Actors Guild Awards.

Watts played Ann Darrow in Peter Jackson's monster film remake King Kong (2005), for which she won the Saturn Award for Best Actress. She also reprised her role voicing Darrow in the video game adaptation, for which she was nominated for a Spike Video Game Award for Best Performance by a Female. Five years later, she portrayed CIA officer Valerie Plame in the biographical drama Fair Game (2010) with Sean Penn. In 2011, Watts played FBI director J. Edgar Hoover's secretary Helen Gandy in the biographical drama J. Edgar with Leonardo DiCaprio. The following year, she starred as a doctor who is caught up by the aftermath of the 2004 Indian Ocean tsunami with her family in The Impossible (2012). For her performance, Watts received nominations for Best Actress at the Oscars and Golden Globe Awards.

She reteamed with Iñárritu on the 2014 black comedy Birdman. In 2017, Watts starred in the third season of Lynch's television series Twin Peaks and as a psychologist in the psychological thriller series Gypsy which she also executive produced. She played Queen Gertrude and Mechthild in the romantic drama Ophelia (2018). Two years later Watts portrayed Fox News journalist Gretchen Carlson in the miniseries The Loudest Voice (2019).

Key
†	Denotes works that have not yet been released

== Film ==
Year	Title	Role(s)	Notes	Ref(s)
1986	For Love Alone	Leo's girlfriend		
1991	Flirting	Janet Odgers		
1993	Matinee	"Shook Up Shopping Cart" starlet		
1993	Wide Sargasso Sea	Fanny Grey		
1993	Gross Misconduct	Jennifer Carter		
1993	The Custodian	Louise		
1995	Tank Girl	Jet Girl		
1996	Children of the Corn IV: The Gathering	Grace Rhodes		
1996	Persons Unknown	Molly L. Chenoweth		
1997	Under the Lighthouse Dancing	Louise		
1998	A House Divided	Amanda	Short film	
1998	Dangerous Beauty	Giulia De Lezze		
1998	Babe: Pig in the City	—N/a	Additional voices	
1999	Strange Planet	Alice		
2001	Never Date an Actress	Shallow Girlfriend	Short film	
2001	Ellie Parker	Ellie Parker	Short film; also producer	
2001	Down	Jennifer Evans		
2001	Mulholland Drive	Betty Elms / Diane Selwyn (Note: Watts plays a character known by two different names in this film.)		
2002	Rabbits	Suzie	Short film series	
2002	The Ring	Rachel Keller		
2002	Plots with a View	Meredith Mainwaring		
2003	Ned Kelly	Julia Cook		
2003	Le Divorce	Roxeanne de Persand		
2003	21 Grams	Cristina Peck		
2004	We Don't Live Here Anymore	Edith Evans	Also producer	
2004	The Assassination of Richard Nixon	Marie Andersen Bicke		
2004	I Heart Huckabees	Dawn Campbell		
2005	Ellie Parker	Ellie Parker	Also producer	
2005	The Ring Two	Rachel Keller		
2005	Stay	Lila Culpepper		
2005	King Kong	Ann Darrow		
2006	Inland Empire	Suzie Rabbit		
2006	The Painted Veil	Kitty Garstin Fane	Also producer	
2007	Eastern Promises	Anna "Anya" Ivanovna Khitrova		
2007	Funny Games	Ann Farber	Also executive producer	
2009	The International	Eleanor Whitman		
2009	Mother and Child	Elizabeth Joyce		
2010	You Will Meet a Tall Dark Stranger	Sally Channing		
2010	Fair Game	Valerie Plame		
2011	Dream House	Ann Patterson		
2011	J. Edgar	Helen Gandy		
2012	The Impossible	Maria Bennett		
2013	Movie 43	Samantha Miller	Segment: "Homeschooled"	
2013	Adoration	Lil Weston	Also executive producer	
2013	Sunlight Jr.	Melissa Wingers		
2013	Diana	Diana, Princess of Wales		
2013	The Last Impresario	Herself	Documentary; also associate producer	
2014	Birdman or (The Unexpected Virtue of Ignorance)	Lesley Truman		
2014	St. Vincent	Daka Parimova		
2014	While We're Young	Cornelia Schrebnick		
2015	The Divergent Series: Insurgent	Evelyn Johnson-Eaton		
2015	The Sea of Trees	Joan Brennan		
2015	Demolition	Karen Moreno		
2015	3 Generations	Maggie	Also executive producer	
2016	The Divergent Series: Allegiant	Evelyn Johnson-Eaton		
2016	Chuck	Linda Wepner		
2016	Shut In	Mary Portman		
2017	I Am Heath Ledger	Herself	Documentary	
2017	The Book of Henry	Susan Carpenter		
2017	The Glass Castle	Rose Mary Walls		
2018	Ophelia	Queen Gertrude / Mechthild		
2018	Vice	Fox News Anchor	Uncredited cameo appearance	
2019	Luce	Amy Edgar		
2019	The Wolf Hour	June Leigh	Also executive producer	
2020	Penguin Bloom	Sam Bloom	Also executive producer	
2021	Boss Level	Jemma Wells		
2021	The Desperate Hour	Amy Carr	Also producer	
2021	This Is the Night	Marie Dedea	Also executive producer	
2022	Infinite Storm	Pam Bales	Also producer	
2022	Goodnight Mommy	Mother	Also executive producer	
2024	The Friend	Iris	Also executive producer	
2024	Emmanuelle	Margot		
2026	Spider-Man: Brand New Day	E.V.	Voice role	
2026	The Housewife †	Hermine Braunsteiner	Post-production	
2026	Closing Night †	April Donaldson	Post-production	

== Television ==
Year	Title	Role	Notes	Ref(s)
1990	Hey Dad..!	Belinda Lawrence	Episodes: "Eternal Quadrangle" and "Bulk Bill Dill"	
1991	Brides of Christ	Frances Heffernan	Miniseries; 5 episodes	
1991	Home and Away	Julie Gibson	Recurring role; 19 episodes	
1996	Secrets of the Bermuda Triangle	Amanda	Television film	
1996	Timepiece	Mary Chandler	Television film	
1997–1998	Sleepwalkers	Kate Russell	Main role; 9 episodes	
1998	The Christmas Wish	Renee	Television film	
1999	The Hunt for the Unicorn Killer	Holly Maddux	Television film	
2000	The Wyvern Mystery	Alice Fairfield	Television film	
2002	The Outsider	Rebecca Yoder	Television film	
2011	Sesame Street	Herself	Episode: "Goodbye Pacifier"	
2014	BoJack Horseman	Herself	Voice role; Episode: "One Trick Pony"	
2017	Twin Peaks	Janey-E Jones	Main role; 10 episodes (season 3)	
2017	Gypsy	Jean Holloway	Main role; 10 episodes (also executive producer)	
2019	The Loudest Voice	Gretchen Carlson	Main role; 7 episodes	
2019	Bloodmoon	Unknown	Unaired television pilot	
2020	Secrets of the Zoo: Down Under	Narrator	Voice role; 10 episodes (season 1)	
2022	The Watcher	Nora Brannock	Main role; 7 episodes (also executive producer)	
2024	Feud: Capote vs. The Swans	Babe Paley	Main role; 8 episodes (also executive producer)	
2025	Too Much	Ann Ratigan	Recurring role; 4 episodes	
2025–present	All's Fair	Liberty Ronson	Main role; 9 episodes (also executive producer)	
2026	Love Story	Jacqueline Kennedy Onassis	Main role; 3 episodes	

== Video games ==
Year	Title	Role	Notes	Ref(s)
2005	King Kong	Ann Darrow (voice)	Based on the film	

== See also ==
- List of awards and nominations received by Naomi Watts
