= List of awards and nominations received by Naomi Watts =

Naomi Watts awards and nominations
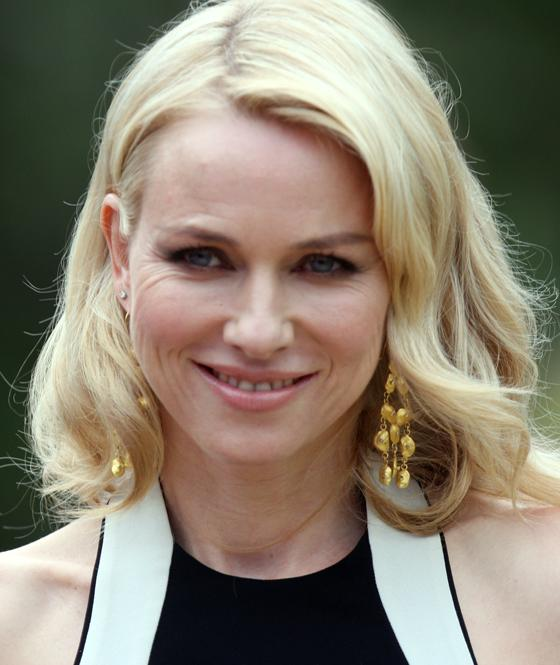
- Watts in 2014
Awards and nominations
Award	Wins	Nominations
Academy Awards	0	2
Actor Awards	1	4
BAFTA Awards	0	1
Emmy Awards	0	1
Critics' Choice	1	4
Golden Globes	0	2

Totals (Note: Certain award groups do not simply award one winner. They acknowledge several different recipients, have runners-up, and have third place. Since this is a specific recognition and is different from losing an award, runner-up mentions are considered wins in this award tally. For simplification and to avoid errors, each award in this list has been presumed to have had a prior nomination.)
- Wins: 46
- Nominations: 102

This article is a List of awards and nominations received by Naomi Watts

Naomi Watts is a British actress known for her roles on film and television. Over her career she has received various accolades including an Actor Award, a Critics' Choice Movie Award, an Independent Spirit Award and two prizes from the Venice Film Festival as well as nominations for two Academy Awards, a British Academy Film Award, a Primetime Emmy Award and two Golden Globe Awards.

She made her film debut in the Australian drama film For Love Alone (1986). However, it was her award-winning role as an aspiring actress in Los Angeles in the David Lynch surrealist psychological thriller Mulholland Drive (2001) that first brought her international recognition as well as numerous critics awards including the National Board of Review and the National Society of Film Critics Award for Best Actress.

Watts portrayed a grief-stricken mother in the Alejandro González Iñárritu directed crime thriller 21 Grams (2003) for which she was nominated for the Academy Award for Best Actress, the BAFTA Award for Best Actress in a Leading Role, the Actor Award for Outstanding Performance by a Female Actor in a Leading Role and the Critics' Choice Movie Award for Best Actress. She played a tsunami survivor in the J. A. Bayona directed disaster drama The Impossible (2012) for which she was nominated for the Academy Award for Best Actress, the Golden Globe Award for Best Actress in a Motion Picture – Drama, and the Actor Award for Outstanding Performance by a Female Actor in a Leading Role. For her role as pregnant Russian sex worker in the comedy St. Vincent (2014) she was nominated for the Actor Award for Outstanding Actress in a Supporting Role.

On television, she portrayed Babe Paley in the FX on Hulu limited series Feud: Capote vs. The Swans (2024) for which she was nominated for the Primetime Emmy Award for Outstanding Lead Actress in a Limited or Anthology Series or Movie, the Golden Globe Award for Best Actress – Miniseries or Television Film and the Critics' Choice Television Award for Best Actress in a Movie/Miniseries.

== Major associations ==
=== Academy Awards ===
Year	Category	Nominated work	Result	Ref.
2003	Best Actress	21 Grams	Nominated	
2012	Best Actress	The Impossible	Nominated	

=== Actor Awards ===
Year	Category	Nominated work	Result	Ref.
2003	Outstanding Actress in a Leading Role	21 Grams	Nominated	
2012	Outstanding Actress in a Leading Role	The Impossible	Nominated	
2014	Outstanding Actress in a Supporting Role	St. Vincent	Nominated	
2014	Outstanding Cast in a Motion Picture	Birdman or (The Unexpected Virtue of Ignorance)	Won	

=== BAFTA Awards ===
Year	Category	Nominated work	Result	Ref.
British Academy Film Awards
2004	Best Actress in a Leading Role	21 Grams	Nominated	

=== Critics' Choice Awards ===
Year	Category	Nominated work	Result	Ref.
Critics' Choice Movie Awards
2003	Best Movie Actress	21 Grams	Nominated	
2012	Best Movie Actress	The Impossible	Nominated	
2014	Best Movie Cast	Birdman or (The Unexpected Virtue of Ignorance)	Won	
Critics' Choice Television Award
2024	Best Actress in a Movie/Miniseries	Feud: Capote vs. The Swans	Nominated	

=== Golden Globe Awards ===
Year	Category	Nominated work	Result	Ref.
2012	Best Actress in a Motion Picture – Drama	The Impossible	Nominated	
2024	Best Actress – Miniseries or Television Film	Feud: Capote vs. The Swans	Nominated	

=== Emmy Awards ===
Year	Category	Nominated work	Result	Ref.
2024	Outstanding Lead Actress in a Limited Series or Movie	Feud: Capote vs. The Swans	Nominated	

=== Independent Spirit Awards ===
Year	Category	Nominated work	Result	Ref.
2003	Special Distinction	21 Grams	Won	
2010	Best Supporting Female	Mother and Child	Nominated	

=== Venice Film Festival ===
Year	Category	Nominated work	Result	Ref.
2003	Audience Award – Best Actress	21 Grams	Won	
2003	Wella Prize	21 Grams	Won	
2003	Wella Prize	Le Divorce	Won	

== Miscellaneous awards ==
Association	Year	Category	Nominated work	Result	Ref.
American Film Institute Awards	2001	Actor of the Year – Female – Movies	Mulholland Dr.	Nominated	
Australian Film Institute Awards	2004	Global Achievement	Herself	Won	
Australian Film Institute Awards	2006	Best Actress – International	King Kong	Nominated	
Australian Film Institute Awards	2010	Best Actress – International	Mother and Child	Nominated	
AACTA Awards	2012	Best Actress – International	The Impossible	Nominated	
AACTA Awards	2013	Best Actress in a Leading Role	Adore	Nominated	
AACTA Awards	2015	Best Supporting Actress – International	Birdman or (The Unexpected Virtue of Ignorance)	Nominated	
Cinema Writers Circle Awards	2012	Best Actress	The Impossible	Won	
Empire Awards	2005	Best Actress	King Kong	Nominated	
Empire Awards	2012	Best Actress	The Impossible	Nominated	
European Film Awards	2013	Best Actress	The Impossible	Nominated	
Fangoria Chainsaw Awards	2002	Best Leading Actress	The Ring	Won	
Fangoria Chainsaw Awards	2007	Best Leading Actress	Funny Games	Runner-up	
Giffoni Film Festival Awards	2009	Giffoni Award	Herself	Won	
Golden Raspberry Awards	2013	Worst Actress	Diana	Nominated	
Golden Raspberry Awards	2013	Worst Actress	Movie 43	Nominated	
Golden Raspberry Awards	2016	Worst Actress	The Divergent Series: Allegiant	Nominated	
Golden Raspberry Awards	2016	Worst Actress	Shut In	Nominated	
Goya Awards	2012	Best Actress	The Impossible	Nominated	
Hollywood Film Festival Awards	2002	Breakthrough Acting	The Ring	Won	
International Cinephile Society	2005	Best Actress	King Kong	Won	
International Cinephile Society	2006	Best Actress	The Painted Veil	Runner-up	
International Cinephile Society	2010	Best Supporting Actress	Mother and Child	Nominated	
Italian Online Movie Awards	2003	Best Actress	21 Grams	Won	
Online Film & Television Association	2001	Best Breakthrough Performance – Female	Mulholland Dr.	Won	
Online Film & Television Association	2001	Best Actress	Mulholland Dr.	Nominated	
Online Film & Television Association	2003	Best Actress	21 Grams	Nominated	
Online Film & Television Association	2003	Best Ensemble	21 Grams	Nominated	
Online Film & Television Association	2005	Best Actress	King Kong	Nominated	
Online Film & Television Association	2012	Best Actress	The Impossible ("The Tsunami")	Nominated	
Online Film & Television Association	2012	Most Cinematic Moment	The Impossible ("The Tsunami")	Nominated	
Outfest Awards	2001	Screen Idol	Mulholland Dr.	Won	
Palm Springs International Film Festival	2003	Desert Palm Achievement	21 Grams	Won	
Palm Springs International Film Festival	2012	Desert Palm Achievement	The Impossible	Won	
San Sebastián International Film Festival	2026	Donostia Award	In recognition of her career	Won	
Santa Barbara International Film Festival	2006	Montecito Career Award	Herself	Won	
Satellite Awards	2003	Best Actress – Motion Picture	21 Grams	Nominated	
Satellite Awards	2010	Best Actress – Motion Picture	Fair Game	Nominated	
Satellite Awards	2020	Best Supporting Actress – Television	The Loudest Voice	Nominated	
Saturn Awards	2001	Best Actress	Mulholland Dr.	Nominated	
Saturn Awards	2002	Best Actress	The Ring	Won	
Saturn Awards	2005	Best Actress	King Kong	Won	
Saturn Awards	2007	Best Actress	Eastern Promises	Nominated	
Saturn Awards	2012	Best Actress	The Impossible	Nominated	
Scream Awards	2006	Scream Queen	King Kong	Nominated	
Seattle International Film Festival	2005	New American Cinema – Honorable Mention	Ellie Parker	Won	
Teen Choice Awards	2005	Choice Movie Scream Scene	The Ring Two	Nominated	
Teen Choice Awards	2013	Choice Movie Actress – Drama	The Impossible	Nominated	
Spike Video Game Awards	2005	Best Performance by a Female	Peter Jackson's King Kong: The Official Game of The Movie	Nominated	
Spike Video Game Awards	2005	Best Cast	Peter Jackson's King Kong: The Official Game of The Movie	Won	

== Critics awards ==
Association	Year	Category	Nominated work	Result	Ref.
Boston Society of Film Critics	2001	Best Actress	Mulholland Dr.	Runner-up	
Boston Society of Film Critics	2003	Best Actress	21 Grams	Runner-up	
Boston Society of Film Critics	2014	Best Ensemble	Birdman or (The Unexpected Virtue of Ignorance)	Runner-up	
Central Ohio Film Critics Association	2012	Best Actress	The Impossible	Runner-up	
Central Ohio Film Critics Association	2014	Best Ensemble	Birdman or (The Unexpected Virtue of Ignorance)	Runner-up	
Chicago Film Critics Association	2001	Best Actress	Mulholland Dr.	Won	
Chicago Film Critics Association	2003	Best Actress	21 Grams	Nominated	
Chicago Film Critics Association	2005	Best Actress	King Kong	Nominated	
Chicago Film Critics Association	2012	Best Actress	The Impossible	Nominated	
Dallas–Fort Worth Film Critics Association	2003	Best Actress	21 Grams	Nominated	
Dallas–Fort Worth Film Critics Association	2012	Best Actress	The Impossible	Nominated	
Detroit Film Critics Society	2012	Best Actress	The Impossible	Nominated	
Detroit Film Critics Society	2014	Best Ensemble	Birdman or (The Unexpected Virtue of Ignorance)	Won	
Film Critics Circle of Australia	2013	Best Actress	Adore	Won	
Florida Film Critics Circle	2003	Best Actress	21 Grams	Won	
Florida Film Critics Circle	2014	Best Ensemble	Birdman or (The Unexpected Virtue of Ignorance)	Nominated	
Houston Film Critics Society	2012	Best Performance by an Actress in a Leading Role	The Impossible	Nominated	
Las Vegas Film Critics Society	2001	Best Supporting Actress	Mulholland Dr.	Won	
Las Vegas Film Critics Society	2014	Best Ensemble	Birdman or (The Unexpected Virtue of Ignorance)	Won	
London Film Critics' Circle	2005	Actress of the Year	King Kong	Won	
Los Angeles Film Critics Association	2001	Best Actress	Mulholland Dr.	Runner-up	
Los Angeles Film Critics Association	2003	Best Actress	21 Grams	Won	
National Association of Theatre Owners Awards	2002	ShoWest Convention – Female Star of Tomorrow	Herself	Won	
National Board of Review	2001	Breakthrough Performance – Female	Mulholland Dr.	Won	
National Society of Film Critics	2001	Best Actress	Mulholland Dr.	Won	
National Society of Film Critics	2003	Best Actress	21 Grams	3rd Place	
New York Film Critics Circle	2001	Best Actress	Mulholland Dr.	Runner-up	
New York Film Critics Circle	2003	Best Actress	21 Grams	Runner-up	
New York Film Critics Online	2001	Breakthrough Performance	Mulholland Dr.	Won	
New York Film Critics Online	2014	Best Ensemble Cast	Birdman or (The Unexpected Virtue of Ignorance)	Won	
Online Film Critics Society	2001	Best Breakthrough Performance	Mulholland Dr.	Won	
Online Film Critics Society	2001	Best Actress	Mulholland Dr.	Won	
Online Film Critics Society	2003	Best Actress	21 Grams	Won	
Online Film Critics Society	2005	Best Actress	King Kong	Nominated	
Phoenix Film Critics Society	2003	Best Ensemble Acting	21 Grams	Won	
Phoenix Film Critics Society	2003	Best Actress in a Leading Role	21 Grams	Won	
Phoenix Film Critics Society	2012	Best Actress in a Leading Role	The Impossible	Nominated	
Phoenix Film Critics Society	2014	Best Ensemble Acting	Birdman or (The Unexpected Virtue of Ignorance)	Won	
San Diego Film Critics Society	2001	Best Supporting Actress	Mulholland Dr.	Won	
San Diego Film Critics Society	2003	Best Actress	21 Grams	Won	
San Diego Film Critics Society	2012	Best Actress	The Impossible	Nominated	
San Diego Film Critics Society	2014	Best Film Ensemble	Birdman or (The Unexpected Virtue of Ignorance)	Won	
Southeastern Film Critics Association	2003	Best Actress	21 Grams	Won	
St. Louis Gateway Film Critics Association	2010	Best Actress	Fair Game	Nominated	
St. Louis Gateway Film Critics Association	2012	Special Merit	The Impossible	Won	
Utah Film Critics Association	2003	Best Actress	21 Grams	Runner-up	
Vancouver Film Critics Circle	2005	Best Actress	King Kong	Nominated	
Vancouver Film Critics Circle	2007	Best Actress in a Canadian Film	Eastern Promises	Nominated	
Village Voice Film Poll Awards	2001	Best Lead Performance	Mulholland Dr.	Won	
Washington D.C. Area Film Critics Association	2003	Best Actress	21 Grams	Won	
Washington D.C. Area Film Critics Association	2014	Best Acting Ensemble	Birdman or (The Unexpected Virtue of Ignorance)	Won	
