= Jonathan Liebesman =

South African film director

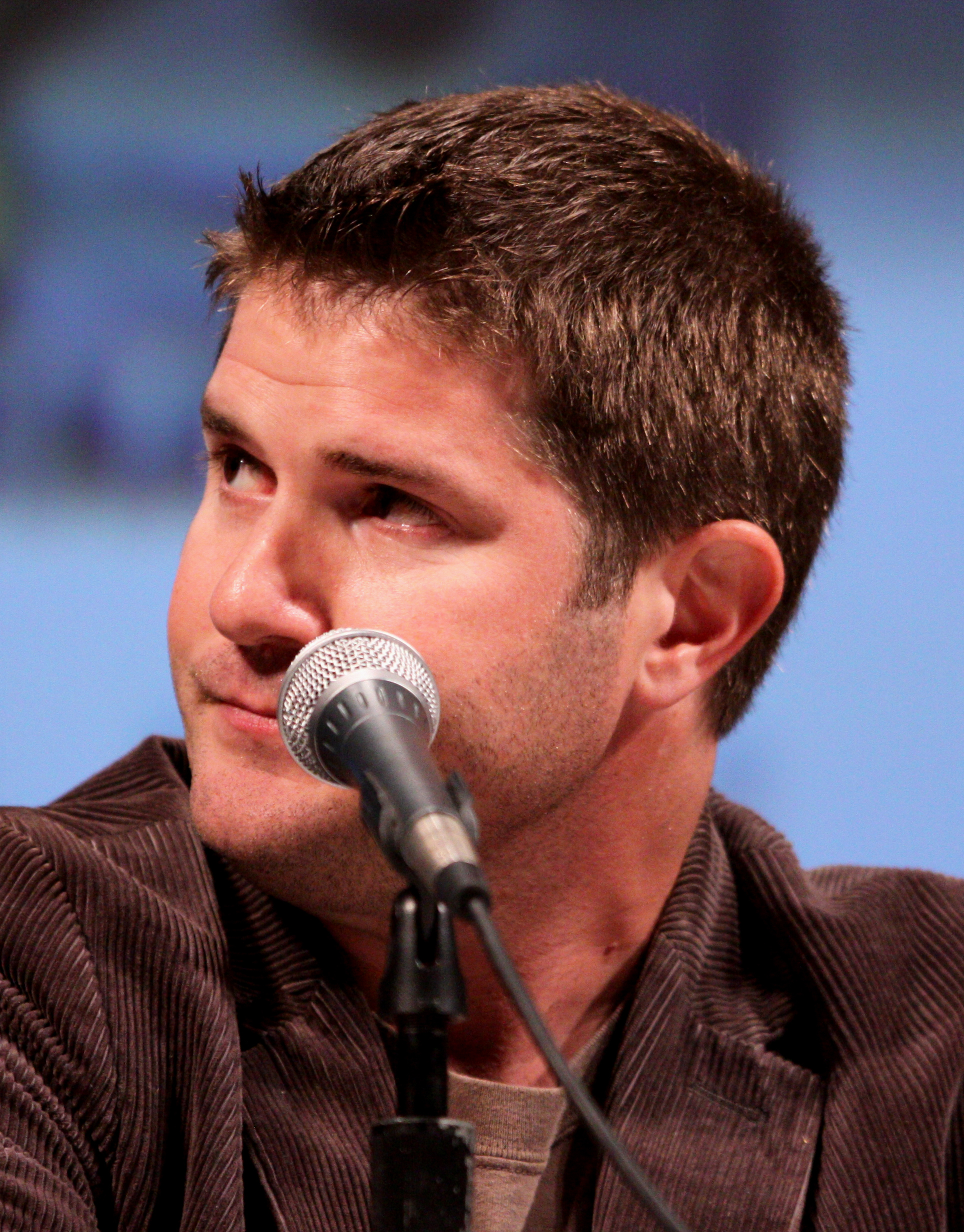
- Liebesman at San Diego Comic-Con in July 2010
- Born: 15 September 1976 (age 49); Johannesburg, South Africa
- Occupations: Film director; screenwriter
- Years active: 2000-present

Jonathan Liebesman (born 15 September 1976) is a South African film director and screenwriter. He is known for directing the films Darkness Falls (2003), The Texas Chainsaw Massacre: The Beginning (2006), Battle: Los Angeles (2011), Wrath of the Titans (2012), and Teenage Mutant Ninja Turtles (2014).

== Personal life ==
Liebesman was born in Johannesburg, South Africa. He studied filmmaking at the AFDA, The South African School of Motion Picture Medium and Live Performance and at NYU's Tisch School of the Arts. He is Jewish. His cousin is director Dean Israelite.

At Tisch, he co-wrote and directed an 8-minute short film, Genesis and Catastrophe, adapted from a Roald Dahl short story. The film was screened at numerous festivals around the world, and in 2000 won an award in the category of 'best short' at the Austin Film Festival. This earned Liebesman the "Hollywood Young Filmmaker Award" at the Hollywood Film Festival in 2000.

== Career ==
In 2002, he directed his debut feature Darkness Falls at the age of 26. Although the film suffered from generally weak reviews, it opened at no. 1 at the US box office. The film grossed over $32.5 million at the US box office, and a further $15 million worldwide. The film was nominated for Best Horror/Thriller at the Teen Choice Awards in 2003, while the film's star, Emma Caulfield, won Face of the Future from the Academy of Science Fiction, Fantasy and Horror Films that year.

Liebesman's next project, Rings (2005) (which he co-wrote with Ehren Kruger), was a 17-minute short that chronologically follows the events of the full-length feature, The Ring, and serves as a prequel to The Ring Two (2005). It provided an insightful transition between the two films and garnered high praise from fans of both feature-length films.

The film's success brought him to the attention of Michael Bay and his production company, Platinum Dunes, who hired him to direct The Texas Chainsaw Massacre prequel titled The Texas Chainsaw Massacre: The Beginning.

The Texas Chainsaw Massacre: The Beginning opened in US theaters on 6 October 2006, and proved another box office hit for Liebesman. The $16 million movie opened at No 2 at the US box office with $18.5 million. As of 31 December 2006, the film had grossed around $50 million worldwide, including over $39.5 million in the US.

In 2007, it was initially announced that Liebesman would be the director of the Friday the 13th reboot but as of November 2007, Marcus Nispel, director of The Texas Chainsaw Massacre remake of 2003, replaced Liebesman.

In 2008, Liebesman completed directing his third full-length feature film, The Killing Room, a political thriller starring Chloë Sevigny, Nick Cannon, Timothy Hutton and Peter Stormare, about four people in a psychological study who discover they are subjects in a brutal and classified government program. The film debuted in the non-competition program at the Sundance Festival in January 2009.

In November 2008, Columbia Pictures announced that Liebesman would direct the science fiction film Battle: Los Angeles. The $70 million film – based on the story written by Chris Bertolini – revolved around a marine platoon's encounter in a battle against an alien invasion on the streets of Los Angeles. The film opened at no. 1 at the US box office on 11 March 2011, and earned over $80 million at the US box office, and over $200 million globally.

In early 2009, it was announced that Liebesman was attached to direct a new Warner Bros. film titled Odysseus, an epic based on Homer's Odyssey.

In June 2010, Liebesman was named as the director of the sequel to Clash of the Titans, titled Wrath of the Titans, starring Sam Worthington, Ralph Fiennes, and Liam Neeson. Principal photography began on 23 March 2011, with filming taking place in summer 2011 in studios outside London and on location in Surrey, South Wales and in the Canary Islands on the island of Tenerife. The film was released on 30 March 2012. Like its predecessor, the film was lambasted by critics and plans for a sequel, Revenge of the Titans never got off the ground.

In July 2011, it was announced that Warner Bros. and Liebesman would be collaborating on an upcoming biopic about Julius Caesar.

In February 2012, Liebesman was brought in to direct the reboot of the Teenage Mutant Ninja Turtles film series, Teenage Mutant Ninja Turtles, beating Brett Ratner among others. Filming began in March 2013 in Tupper Lake, New York. Production for the film wrapped on 3 August 2013, and the movie was released in August 2014. The movie was a box office success, but received negative reviews from critics and the TMNT fan base alike. The film was nominated for five Golden Raspberry Awards in 2015 including Worst Director, while the film's star, Megan Fox, won Worst Supporting Actress.

In April 2019, Liebesman oversaw reshoots for Dolittle (2020) alongside writer Chris McKay and the film's director Stephen Gaghan; the reshoots moved the film's release from April 2019 to January 2020.

In 2022 he directed the season 1 finale of the action series Halo.

== Filmography ==
Short film

Year	Title	Director	Writer	Notes
2000	Genesis and Catastrophe	Yes	Yes	Also producer, editor and post-production sound designer
2005	Rings	Yes	Yes	

Feature film

Year	Title	Notes
2003	Darkness Falls	
2006	The Texas Chainsaw Massacre: The Beginning	
2009	The Killing Room	
2011	Battle: Los Angeles	
2012	Wrath of the Titans	
2014	Teenage Mutant Ninja Turtles	Nominated - Golden Raspberry Award for Worst Director
2020	Dolittle	Director of reshoots (uncredited) and executive producer

Television

Year	Title	Director	Executive Producer	Notes
2016	The Shannara Chronicles	Yes	Yes	Episode "Chosen" (Part 1 & 2)
2022	Halo	Yes	No	4 episodes
