= Rings (2005 film) =

2005 supernatural horror short film

- Promotional release poster
- Directed by: Jonathan Liebesman
- Written by: Ehren Kruger; Jonathan Liebesman
- Produced by: Jeanette Volturno; Arnon Manor
- Starring: Ryan Merriman; Emily VanCamp; Kelly Stables; Alexandra Breckenridge; Josh Wise; Justin Allen
- Cinematography: Lukas Ettlin
- Edited by: Sheila Kay Moorland
- Production company: CatchLight Films
- Distributed by: DreamWorks Home Entertainment
- Release date: March 8, 2005
- Running time: 16 minutes
- Country: United States
- Language: English

Rings is a 2005 American supernatural horror short film directed by Jonathan Liebesman, who co-wrote with Ehren Kruger. It serves as a sequel to The Ring (2002) and a prelude to the opening sequence of The Ring Two (2005), both written by Kruger. The film was initially released by DreamWorks Home Entertainment on March 8, 2005, as an extra disc with a re-release of the first film on DVD.

== Plot ==
Sometime after the events of The Ring, Samara Morgan's videotape has spread, as each person who sees the video makes a copy and shows it to someone else. A subculture has grown surrounding the video: people wait to see how close to the seven-day deadline they can get. When they grow too afraid to go on any longer, they show the tape to the next assigned person. Groups that have watched the video are called "rings".

The film is focused on Jake Pierce, the latest member of one such ring. The ring has recruited its next member, Tim, who will watch the tape when Jake cracks. Jake is amazed at what he experiences but it soon turns sinister, as he starts seeing visions of Samara, and has a dream (similar to one that Rachel Keller had) of Samara grabbing his arm and leaving a bruise. He cracks on the sixth day, but Tim refuses to watch the tape. Unbeknownst to Jake, Vanessa, another member of the ring, forced Tim to refuse, as she wants to see what happens on day seven.

By the next day, Jake has become so desperate he tries to play the video at an electronics store but is caught and thrown out. Jake thinks of Emily, a girl he goes to school with, and invites her over. He experiences a vision in which Samara arrives; she reaches through the screen on his video camera.

An hour before the deadline, Emily, encouraged by Vanessa, agrees to come, leading to the opening sequence of The Ring Two.

== Cast ==
- Ryan Merriman as Jake Pierce
- Emily VanCamp as Emily
- Kelly Stables as Samara Morgan
- Alexandra Breckenridge as Vanessa
- Josh Wise as Timothy "Tim" Rivers
- Justin Allen as Eddie
- Andrew D'Amico as Store Employee

== Release ==
Rings was released in the United States on March 8, 2005, by DreamWorks Home Entertainment. It initially appeared in a DVD re-release of The Ring as a pack-in bonus disc.It was later included with the DVD release of The Ring Two.

== Reception ==
The short film garnered positive reviews from both critics and audiences who purchased the special edition of the first film; released shortly before The Ring Two. Felix Vasquez Jr. of Cinema Crazed said, "...a very sleek and morbid short film, and one infinitely more enjoyable and tense than the sequel could be".
