= Josh Wise (actor) =

American actor

- Born: Joshua Stephen Wise; January 31, 1986 (age 39); Dallas, Texas
- Occupation: Actor

Joshua Stephen Wise (born January 31, 1986) is an American actor. He is most notable for playing the character Pat Brody in The WB's 2002 television sitcom, Do Over.

== Biography ==
Josh Wise was born in Dallas, Texas and raised in McAllen, Texas. After showing promise in junior high school drama classes, his mother enrolled him in acting lessons. Subsequently, his acting coach introduced him to a manager. Soon he was cast in a starring role in the pilot for an unaired series on The WB called Murphy's Dozen. He also appeared in episodes of Frasier and Lizzie McGuire. In 2002, he relocated to Los Angeles after being cast as a series regular on Do Over.

== Filmography ==
Year	Film/television	Role
2001	Murphy's Dozen (unsold TV series pilot)	Brendan
2002	Frasier	Warren Clayton
2002	Do Over	Pat Brody
2003	Lizzie McGuire	Corey 'Hezekiah'
2005	Without a Trace	Shawn Hopkins
2005	Rings	Timothy "Tim" Rivers
2006	The Naked Ape	Alex
