= The Killing Room =

- Theatrical release poster
- Directed by: Jonathan Liebesman
- Screenplay by: Gus Krieger; Ann Peacock
- Story by: Gus Krieger
- Produced by: Guymon Casady; Ross M. Dinerstein; Bobby Schwartz; Ben Forkner
- Starring: Chloë Sevigny; Nick Cannon; Timothy Hutton; Clea DuVall; Shea Whigham; Peter Stormare
- Cinematography: Lukas Ettlin
- Edited by: Sean Carter
- Music by: Brian Tyler
- Production companies: Winchester Capital Partners; Management 360; Eleven Eleven Films
- Distributed by: ContentFilm
- Release date: January 16, 2009 (Sundance)
- Running time: 93 minutes
- Country: United States
- Language: English

The Killing Room is a 2009 American psychological thriller film directed by Jonathan Liebesman and starring Clea DuVall, Nick Cannon, Chloë Sevigny and Timothy Hutton. It premiered at the 2009 Sundance Film Festival. It was distributed internationally by ContentFilm.

== Plot ==
Four individuals sign up for a psychological research study only to discover that they are now subjects of a brutal, modern version of the Project MKULTRA indoctrination program. One by one, the subjects are brought into a large, white room, in which the tables and chairs have been bolted to the floor.

They are each given a questionnaire to fill out. In the meantime, a researcher enters the room, ostensibly to give an overview of the study. He indicates to the subjects—three men and a woman—that the study will take approximately eight hours to complete, at which time they will each be paid $250. Upon completing his introduction, the researcher shoots the female subject in the head with a gun and promptly leaves the room.

Over the next few hours, the remaining three male subjects will be subjected to additional physical and psychological brutality. Only one subject will survive the ordeal. This subject manages to escape into the building. The loudspeaker gives details of where the subject is in the building. It is then realized that the subject is going where he is supposed to be. He ends up in a room with two other males tied to their chairs. The loudspeaker then states that phase 2 is to begin.

It is revealed, during the last subject's escape attempt, that the goal of the covert program is to achieve in human civilians a phenomenon similar to apoptosis in cells (a comparison noted in the film), by developing "civilian weapons" akin to suicide bombers.

== Cast ==
- Chloë Sevigny as Ms. Emily Reilly
- Nick Cannon as Paul Brody
- Timothy Hutton as Crawford Haines
- Shea Whigham as Tony Mazzola
- Peter Stormare as Dr. Phillips
- Clea DuVall as Kerry Isalano

== Reception ==
As of June 2020, the film holds a 71% approval rating on ratings aggregation website Rotten Tomatoes, based on 7 reviews with an average rating of 5.8/10. MTV's Larry Carroll labeled it as the “best movie” at Sundance 2009, praising it as “brutal, daring and utterly unpredictable”. Alongside other films with a claustrophobic air, he characterised it as "Cube with better actors. Reservoir Dogs without the hipness. Lifeboat with a modern spin on war-time paranoia."
