= Do Over =

- Genre: Fantasy; Sitcom
- Created by: Kenny Schwartz; Rick Wiener
- Written by: Josh Bycel; Alan R. Cohen; Jonathan Fener; Alan Freedland; Casey Johnson; Marsha Myers; Kenny Schwartz; David Windsor; Rick Wiener
- Directed by: Bryan Gordon; Neal Israel; Michael Lange; Shawn Levy; Allison Liddi; Lev L. Spiro
- Starring: Penn Badgley; Angela Goethals; Josh Wise; Natasha Melnick; Michael Milhoan; Gigi Rice
- Narrated by: Tom Everett Scott
- Theme music composer: Charlotte Caffey; Kathy Valentine; Jane Wiedlin
- Opening theme: "Do it Over", performed by Go-Go's
- Composer: Marc Bonilla
- Country of origin: United States
- Original language: English
- No. of seasons: 1
- No. of episodes: 15 (4 unaired)

Production
- Executive producers: Warren Littlefield; Kenny Schwartz; Rick Wiener
- Producers: Sally DeSipio; Mark H. Ovitz
- Cinematography: Paul Maibaum
- Editors: Stuart Bass; Rob Starnes
- Camera setup: Single-camera
- Running time: 30 minutes
- Production companies: The Littlefield Company; 3 Hounds Productions; MHS Productions; Paramount Television

Original release
- Network: The WB
- Release: September 19 – December 5, 2002

Do Over is an American fantasy sitcom television series created by Kenny Schwartz and Rick Wiener about a man who gets a chance to relive his childhood. The series, which was originally broadcast on The WB from September 19 to December 5, 2002, stars Penn Badgley.

It was compared to ABC series with a similar premise, That Was Then.

== Synopsis ==
The series begins showing an adult Joel Larsen as a single, depressed paper salesman disappointed with how his life turned out. Joel missed a lot of opportunities; his once-popular sister is now a drug-addict, his idealistic best friend sold out, and his mother ran off and left his father an unhealthy, bitter man. However, a shock from defibrillation paddles sends Joel back to 1981 as his 14-year-old self. He wakes up in his teenage body, but with all his adult memories from 2002 intact. He eventually accepts this new reality, although he tells no one except his best friend, Pat. Blessed with adult wisdom, though hampered by adolescent urges, Joel sets out to right the wrongs that he knows will befall him and his family.

Joel is forced to readjust to the culture of the early 1980s, to junior high, and the trials and tribulations of adolescence. He is forced to relive certain moments of his life, but is always determined to improve the outcome. A running gag in the show is Joel's creative mother coming up with a "new" invention (fanny pack, Lunchables, post-its, etc.) which is usually ridiculed by the father, who instead wants to invest in items such as asbestos tile, Betamax cassettes, or electric typewriters. Some episodes show Joel using his knowledge of the future for personal gain: investing in Intel stock, palming off 1990s song hits as his own, befriending a future billionaire, etc. However, the situations never work out according to plan and Joel usually ends up realizing he needs to use this opportunity to help himself, his family and friends take different paths. The final episode of the series shows Joel convincing his father to invest in one of his mother's inventions, which to Joel's surprise is the one invention that doesn't exist in the future. It ends with Joel and his family toasting the future.

== Cast ==
- Penn Badgley as Joel Larsen
- Tom Everett Scott as the voice of adult Joel Larsen
- Angela Goethals as Cheryl Larsen, Joel's sister
- Josh Wise as Pat Brody, Joel's best friend
- Natasha Melnick as Isabelle Meyers, Joel's other close friend
- Michael Milhoan as Bill Larsen, Joel's dad
- Gigi Rice as Karen Larsen, Joel's mom

== Theme song ==
The theme song was Do It Over by the Go-Go's. It was usually prefaced by an introductory statement by adult Joel Larson.

== Episodes ==
No.	Title	Directed by	Written by	Original release date	U.S. viewers (millions)
1	"Pilot"	Lev L. Spiro	Rick Wiener & Kenny Schwartz	September 19, 2002	3.29
A 34-year-old man propelled back in time, where it's 1980 and he's 14 again. First up: Joel is reliving his campaign for class vice president and discovers it's the day of his fateful, and disastrous, campaign speech.
2	"Joel Strikes Back"	Lev L. Spiro	Rick Wiener	September 26, 2002	2.63
A bully wants to fight Joel after they get in an argument about the safety of steroids. Joel is determined to learn to stand up for himself. The fight coincides with the release of the first Star Wars sequel.
3	"Investing in the Future"	Michael Lange & Dave Thomas	Alan R. Cohen & Alan Freedland	October 3, 2002	2.33
Joel's parents constantly fight about money, so Joel decides to hunt for a job in order to invest in a sure stock for his family's future. Joel disguises his age and sells paper again, but finds himself in the same pattern he was in as an adult.
4	"The Anniversary"	Michael Lange & Dave Thomas	Marsha Myers	October 10, 2002	2.40
Joel tries to prevent his mom from meeting the man who will break up his parents' marriage, and he gives his dad some romantic advice in the hopes that it will inspire him to put the spark back in their relationship.
5	"Take Me Out of the Ballgame"	Lev L. Spiro	Alan R. Cohen & Alan Freedland	October 17, 2002	1.83
The championship baseball game is drawing near and Joel is determined to find a way out of playing, since he was responsible for losing the game the first time around. Things don't turn out as planned, but he learns a lesson about fate.
6	"Rock 'n' Roll Parking Lot"	Lev L. Spiro	Kenny Schwartz	October 24, 2002	2.56
Joel is torn between going to a Def Leppard concert with his friends or stopping Cheryl from getting into some serious trouble, the sort that leads later to some bad habits in her adult life.
7	"Hollyween" "Halloween Kiss"	Bryan Gordon	Casey Johnson & David Windsor	October 31, 2002	2.11
Joel attends a Halloween bash and decides that he's going to change his romantic history by trying to kiss his crush, Holly.
8	"Star Search"	Lev L. Spiro	Josh Bycel & Jonathan Fener	November 7, 2002	2.15
Joel is encouraged to try out for the premiere of Star Search when he plays a song by Green Day at a talent show. Pat decides to be his manager and Isabelle helps him with 1980s fashion as his image consultant.
9	"Block Party"	Shawn Levy	Casey Johnson & David Windsor	November 14, 2002	2.13
Joel and his family attend the annual block party, where Joel tries to teach his dad that winning isn't everything. Joel also attempts to spare Isabelle from a broken heart.
10	"Cold War"	Allison Liddi-Brown	Rick Wiener & Kenny Schwartz	November 15, 2002	3.27
After a fight over his curfew, Joel decides to take a stand and moves in with Pat where the rules are less strict. Joel makes a bet with dad over the Winter Olympics.
11	"Joel Larson's Day Off"	Michael Lange & Dave Thomas	Marsha Myers	December 5, 2002	2.45
It's Joel's birthday, and he decides to celebrate by cutting school ala "Ferris Bueller" along with Isabelle and Pat. Their plan hits a rough patch when they are seen leaving the grounds. Special guest star Ben Stein. This was the final episode shown on WB before cancellation.
12	"Hot for Teacher"	Michael Engler	Josh Bycel & Jonathan Fener	Unaired	N/A
When Joel begins to fail biology, his parents hire a tutor. After meeting his attractive tutor, Joel is determined to impress her so that he can work up to asking her out.
13	"Short Cuts"	Michael Lange	Teleplay by : Alan R. Cohen & Alan Freedland; Story by : Rick Wiener & Kenny Schwartz	Unaired	N/A
Joel enters into the science fair in order to not fail biology class, but tries to leech a project off of the smart kid who grows up to be a billionaire.
14	"Valentine's Day Dance"	Michael Spiller	Rick Wiener & Kenny Schwartz	Unaired	N/A
Holly agrees to go with Joel to the Valentine's Day dance, and he expects everything to be perfect, but things don't go as planned. Also in this episode, Joel tries to help rekindle the romance between his parents.
15	"Chilghetti"	Lev L. Spiro	Casey Johnson & David Windsor	Unaired	N/A
Joel persuades Bill to financially back one of Karen's inventions, but changes his mind after he learns the idea she plans to market. Also, Joel tries to talk Isabelle out of a disastrous audition for the school play. This was to be the season finale of the show but turned out to be the final show of the series.

== Reception and cancellation ==
The show originally aired on The WB in 2002. It was scheduled on Thursdays at 8:30 EST. The show was pitted against CBS's Survivor and NBC's Scrubs. Although the show had a devoted fan base, it suffered from low ratings and was cancelled after showing eleven of fifteen episodes. The entire series, including the final four episodes, aired on Channel 4 in Great Britain in September 2008.

=== Awards and nominations ===
Year	Award	Category	Recipient	Result
2003	Young Artist Awards	Best Performance in a TV Comedy Series – Guest Starring Young Actor	Bobby Edner	Nominated
