= Naomi Watts =

British actress (born 1968)

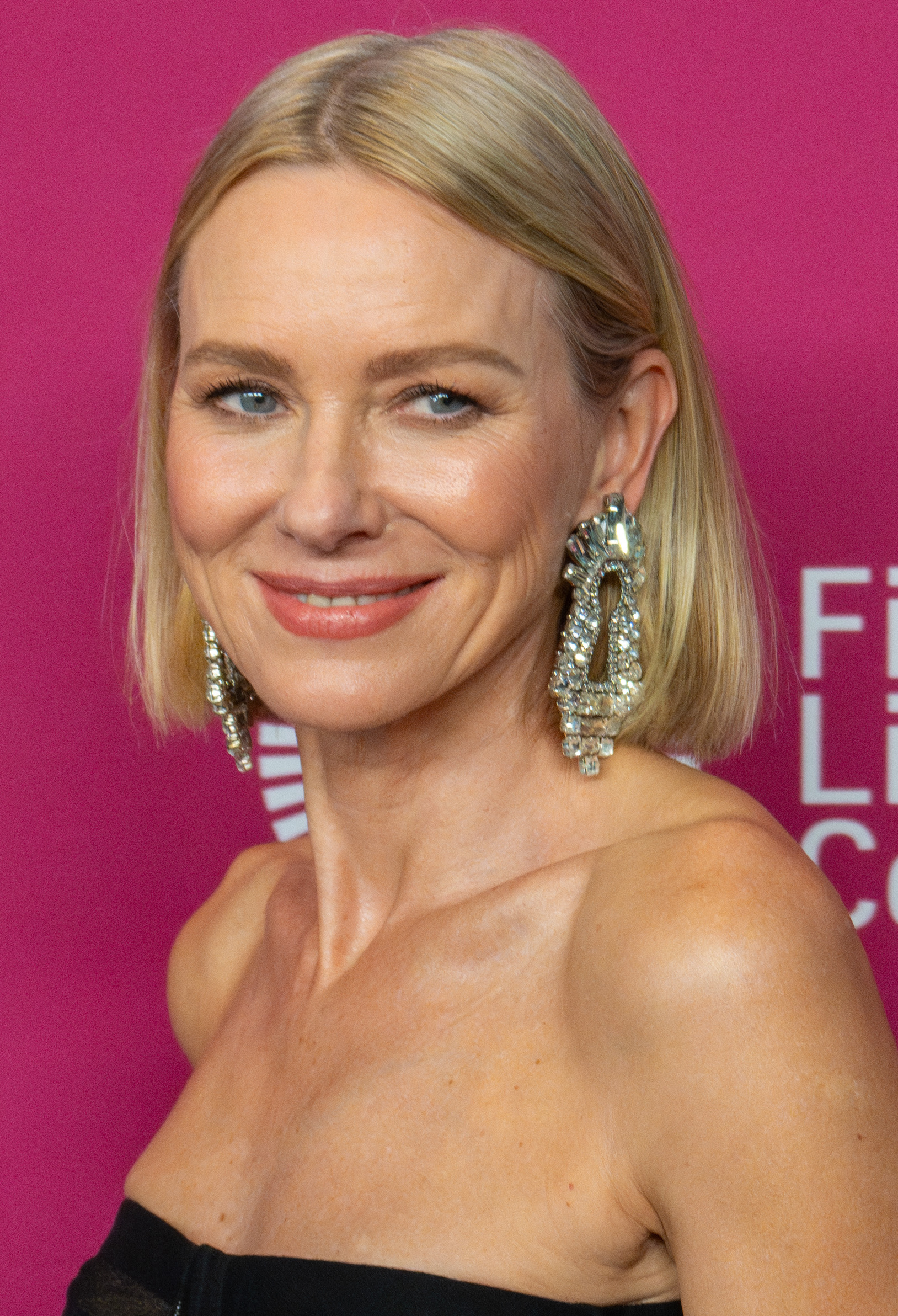
- Watts in 2024
- Born: Naomi Ellen Watts; 28 September 1968 (age 58); Shoreham, Kent, England
- Occupations: Actress; film producer
- Years active: 1986–present
- Works: Full list
- Spouse: Billy Crudup (m. 2023)
- Partner(s): Heath Ledger (2002–2004); Liev Schreiber (2005–2016)
- Children: 2, including Kai Schreiber
- Father: Peter Watts
- Relatives: Ben Watts (brother)
- Awards: Full list

Naomi Ellen Watts (born 28 September 1968) is a British actress. Known for her work in predominantly independent films, she has received various accolades, including an Actor Award, a Critics' Choice Award and two Saturn Awards, as well as nominations for two Academy Awards, a Primetime Emmy Award, and two Golden Globe Awards.

After her family moved to Australia, Watts made her film debut in the drama For Love Alone (1986). She then appeared in three television series, Hey Dad..! (1990), Brides of Christ (1991), and Home and Away (1991), and the film Flirting (1991). Ten years later, she moved to the United States, where she initially struggled as an actress. After appearing in a number of small-scale productions, she received the breakthrough role of an aspiring actress in David Lynch's mystery film Mulholland Drive (2001), which brought her to international attention.

Watts played a tormented journalist in the horror remake The Ring (2002). She was nominated for the Academy Award for Best Actress for her portrayal of a grief-stricken mother in Alejandro González Iñárritu's 21 Grams (2003) and for playing Maria Bennett in the disaster film The Impossible (2012). Watts' other film credits include starring roles in I Heart Huckabees (2004), King Kong (2005), Eastern Promises (2007), The International (2009), Birdman (2014), St. Vincent (2014), While We're Young (2015), The Glass Castle (2017), and Luce (2019). She also appeared in the Divergent franchise (2015–2016).

Watts returned to television with the third season of Lynch's mystery series Twin Peaks (2017) and the biographical miniseries The Loudest Voice (2019). She then starred in the Netflix thriller series The Watcher (2022), the FX anthology series Feud: Capote vs. The Swans (2024) and the Hulu legal drama series All's Fair (2025–present). For her portrayal of Babe Paley in Feud, she received a nomination for the Primetime Emmy Award for Outstanding Lead Actress in a Limited or Anthology Series or Movie. Watts is an ambassador for the Joint United Nations Programme on HIV/AIDS. She shares two children with Liev Schreiber and is married to Billy Crudup.

== Early life and education ==
Naomi Ellen Watts was born on 28 September 1968, in Shoreham, Kent, England. Her mother is Myfanwy Edwards (née Roberts), an antiques dealer, costume designer and set designer with Welsh heritage. (Note: Attributed to multiple references:) Her father was Peter Watts (1946–1976), a road manager and audio engineer who worked with the band Pink Floyd. Watts' parents divorced when she was four years old. After the divorce, her mother moved several times within South East England with Watts and her older brother Ben. When Watts was nearly eight years old, her father was found dead in a flat in Notting Hill, London, of an apparent heroin overdose. Following his death, Watts' mother moved the family to Llanfawr Farm, near Llangefni on the island of Anglesey in north-west Wales, to live with her parents. During the family's three years in Wales, Watts attended Ysgol Henblas school in Llangristiolus.

In 1978, Watts' mother remarried and moved with her children to Suffolk, where Watts attended Thomas Mills High School. Watts said her desire to become an actress was influenced by watching the 1980 film Fame and seeing her mother perform on stage. In 1982, when Watts was 14, the family moved to Sydney, Australia. Watts attended Mosman High School and North Sydney Girls High School, but dropped out before graduating. After leaving school, she worked as a negative cutter, delivered newspapers, and managed a corner store on Sydney's North Shore. Her mother established a career in the burgeoning film business, first working as a stylist for television commercials, and then turning to costume design. For a period she worked on the soap opera Return to Eden, and Watts made a cameo appearance as a model in two episodes. Watts took acting lessons in Sydney and auditioned for numerous commercials, befriending the actress Nicole Kidman along the way.

At the age of 18, Watts decided to become a model. She signed with an agency that sent her to Japan, but after several failed auditions, she returned to Sydney. She worked in advertising for a department store and as an assistant fashion editor for Follow Me magazine. A casual invitation to a drama workshop inspired Watts to quit her job and pursue acting. Despite her years spent in Australia, Watts considers herself firmly British in regards to her nationality.

== Career ==
=== Early roles and struggling career (1986–2000) ===
Watts' career began with appearances in television commercials. She made her film debut in For Love Alone (1986), which was based on the 1945 best-selling novel by Christina Stead. In 1990, Watts appeared in two episodes of the fourth season of the Australian sitcom Hey Dad..!. At the 1989 premiere of her friend Nicole Kidman's film Dead Calm, Watts met John Duigan, who offered her a supporting role in his independent film Flirting (1991). The film was featured on critic Roger Ebert's list of the 10 best films of 1992. Also in 1991, Watts played Frances Heffernan, a girl who struggles to find friends at a Catholic school in Sydney, in the mini-series Brides of Christ. She also had a recurring role in the soap opera Home and Away as the handicapped Julie Gibson. Watts was offered a role in the drama series A Country Practice but turned it down, not wanting to "get stuck on a soap for two or three years". She later said that decision was "naïve".

Watts took a year off to travel, visiting Los Angeles and being introduced to agents through Kidman. Encouraged, Watts decided to move to the United States to pursue her career further. In 1993, she had a small role in Joe Dante's film Matinee. She then returned to Australia temporarily to star in the films Wide Sargasso Sea and The Custodian. She had her first leading role in the film Gross Misconduct, as a student who accuses one of her teachers (played by Jimmy Smits) of raping her. Upon returning to Los Angeles, Watts had difficulty finding agents, producers and directors willing to hire her. At one point she was evicted from her apartment because she could not pay rent on time, and on another occasion she lost her medical insurance. During this time, Watts felt lonely and relied on Kidman for encouragement.

Watts won the supporting role of Jet Girl in the science fiction film Tank Girl (1995), which received mixed reviews and was a box-office disappointment. In 1996, she starred alongside Joe Mantegna, Kelly Lynch and J. T. Walsh in George Hickenlooper's action-thriller Persons Unknown; alongside James Earl Jones, Kevin Kilner and Ellen Burstyn in the period drama Timepiece; and in Bermuda Triangle, a television pilot that was not picked up for a full series. She played the lead role in Children of the Corn IV: The Gathering, a slasher film in which children in a small town become possessed by a slain child preacher.

In 1997, Watts starred in the Australian romantic drama Under the Lighthouse Dancing alongside Jack Thompson and Jacqueline McKenzie. She also played the lead role in the short-lived television series Sleepwalkers. In 1998, she starred alongside Neil Patrick Harris and Debbie Reynolds in the television film The Christmas Wish; played the supporting role of Giulia De Lezze in Dangerous Beauty; and provided her voice for Babe: Pig in the City. In 1999, she played Alice in the romantic comedy Strange Planet and the Texan student Holly Maddux in The Hunt for the Unicorn Killer, which was based on the real-life effort to capture Ira Einhorn, who was charged with Maddux's murder. In 2000, while David Lynch was developing the rejected pilot of Mulholland Drive as a feature film, Watts starred alongside Derek Jacobi, Jack Davenport and Iain Glen in the BBC television film The Wyvern Mystery, an adaptation of the 1869 novel novel The Wyvern Mystery by Sheridan Le Fanu. During this period in her career she was reportedly considered for roles in The Postman and The Devil's Advocate (both 1997), but was not cast.

In 2002 Watts recalled her early career in an interview. She had lost a role she wanted in Meet the Parents in 2000. She said, "It is a tough town. I think my spirit has taken a beating. The most painful thing has been the endless auditions. Knowing that you have something to offer, but not being able to show it, is so frustrating. As an unknown, you get treated badly. I auditioned and waited for things I did not have any belief in, but I needed the work and had to accept horrendous pieces of shit." Watts studied the Meisner Technique. She referred to this again in a 2012 interview. Watts said, "I came to New York and auditioned at least five times for Meet the Parents. I think the director liked me but the studio didn't. I heard every piece of feedback you could imagine, and in this case, it was 'not sexy enough'."

=== Rise to prominence (2001–2002) ===
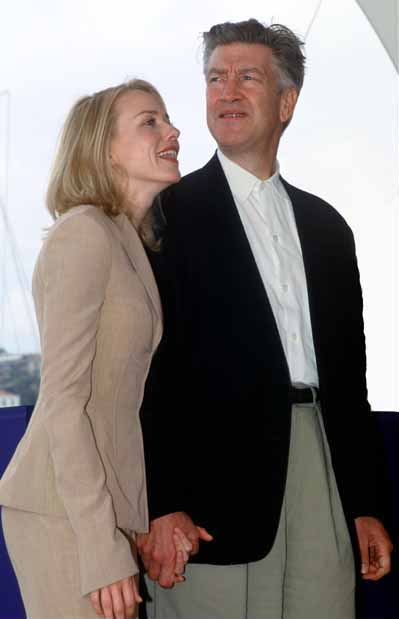
Watts with director David Lynch at the 2001 Cannes Film Festival

In 1999, director David Lynch began casting for his psychological thriller Mulholland Drive. He interviewed Watts after looking at her headshot, without having seen any of her previous work, and offered her the lead role. Lynch later said about his selection of Watts, "I saw someone that I felt had a tremendous talent, and I saw someone who had a beautiful soul, an intelligence—possibilities for a lot of different roles, so it was a beautiful full package." Conceived as a pilot for a television series, Lynch shot a large portion of the film in February 1999, planning to keep it open-ended for a potential series. However, the pilot was rejected. Watts recalled thinking at the time, "just my dumb luck, that I'm in the only David Lynch programme that never sees the light of day." Lynch filmed an ending for the work in October 2000, turning it into a feature film, which was picked up for distribution. Mulholland Drive, also starring Laura Harring and Justin Theroux, premiered at the 2001 Cannes Film Festival to high critical acclaim and marked Watts' breakthrough. Reviewing her performance, Peter Bradshaw of The Guardian stated that "Watts' face metamorphoses miraculously from fresh-faced beauty to a frenzied, teary scowl of ugliness."; Emanuel Levy wrote, "... Watts, in a brilliant performance, a young, wide-eyed and grotesquely cheerful blonde, full of high hopes to make it big in Hollywood." The film and Watts received numerous awards and nominations, including the National Society of Film Critics Award for Best Actress and a nomination for the American Film Institute Award for Best Actress. The surrealist film explored the story of aspiring actress Betty Elms, played by Watts.

Also in 2001, Watts starred in two short films, Never Date an Actress and Ellie Parker, and the horror film Down, director Dick Maas's remake of his 1983 film The Lift. In 2002, she starred in one of the biggest box office hits of that year, The Ring, the English-language remake of the Japanese horror film Ring. Directed by Gore Verbinski, the film, which also starred Martin Henderson and Brian Cox, received favourable reviews and grossed around US$129 million domestically (equivalent to US$230.9 million in 2025). Watts portrayed Rachel Keller, a journalist investigating the strange deaths of her niece and other teenagers after they watched a mysterious videotape and received a phone call announcing their deaths in seven days. Her performance was praised by critics, including Paul Clinton of CNN.com, who said that she "is excellent in this leading role, which proves that her stellar performance in Mulholland Drive was not a fluke. She strikes a perfect balance between skepticism and the slow realisation of the truth in regard to the deadly power of the videotape." In the same year, she also starred in Rabbits, a series of short films directed by David Lynch; alongside several other famous British actors in the black comedy Plots with a View; and with Tim Daly in The Outsider, a western.

=== Established actress (2003–2007) ===
In 2003, Watts took the part of Julia Cook in Gregor Jordan's Australian film Ned Kelly, opposite Heath Ledger, Orlando Bloom and Geoffrey Rush. She also starred in the Merchant-Ivory film Le Divorce. She portrayed Roxeanne de Persand, a poet who is pregnant and abandoned by her husband Charles-Henri de Persand. Roxeanne and her sister Isabel (played by Kate Hudson) dispute the ownership of a painting by Georges de La Tour with the family of Charles-Henri's lover. Entertainment Weekly gave the film a "C" rating and lamented Watts' performance: "I'm disappointed to report that Hudson and Watts have no chemistry as sisters, perhaps because Watts never seems like the expatriate artiste she's supposed to be playing".

Her performance opposite Sean Penn and Benicio del Toro in Alejandro González Iñárritu's psychological drama 21 Grams (2003) earned Watts numerous award nominations, including her first nominations for the Academy Award for Best Actress, the BAFTA Award for Best Actress in a Leading Role and the Screen Actors Guild Award for Outstanding Performance by a Female Actor in a Leading Role. In the story, told in a non-linear manner, she portrayed Cristina Peck, a grief-stricken widow living a suburban life after her husband and two children were killed by Jack Jordan (Benicio del Toro). She became involved in a relationship with Paul Rivers (Sean Penn), an academic mathematician who was critically ill. She has said of the nomination, "It's far beyond what I ever dreamed for – that would have been too far fetched". The New York Times praised her: "Because Ms. Watts reinvents herself with each performance, it's easy to forget how brilliant she is. She has a boldness that comes from a lack of overemphasis, something actresses sometimes do to keep up with Mr. Penn". The San Francisco Chronicle wrote: "Watts is riveting, but she's much better in scenes of extreme emotion than in those requiring subtlety."

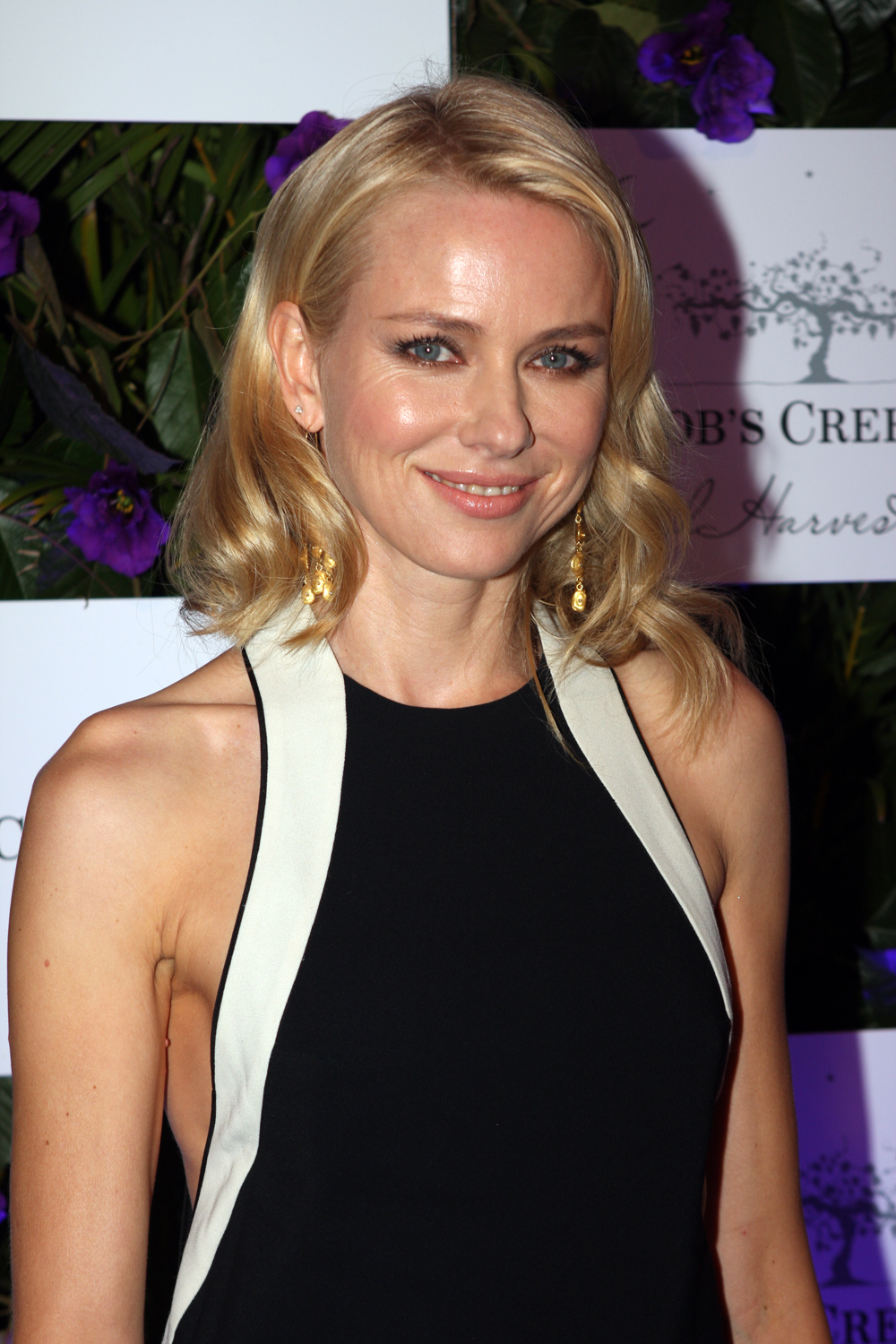
Watts in Sydney in 2012

In 2004, Watts starred alongside Mark Ruffalo in the independent film We Don't Live Here Anymore, based on short stories by Andre Dubus. It explores the crises of two married couples who are friends and struggling in their lives. She reunited with Sean Penn in The Assassination of Richard Nixon, playing the wife of the would-be presidential assassin Samuel Byck (Penn). She teamed up with Jude Law and Dustin Hoffman in David O. Russell's ensemble comedy I Heart Huckabees. She headlined and produced the semi-autobiographical drama Ellie Parker (2005), which depicted the struggle of an Australian actress in Hollywood. The film began as a short film that was screened at the Sundance Film Festival in 2001. Over the next four years, it was expanded into a feature-length production. Film critic Roger Ebert praised Watts' performance: "The character is played by Watts with courage, fearless observation and a gift for timing that is so uncanny it can make points all by itself."

Watts starred in the sequel to The Ring, The Ring Two (2005), which, despite a negative critical response, made more than US$161 million worldwide gross (equivalent to US$265.4 million in 2025). In 2005, Watts also headlined the remake of King Kong as Ann Darrow. She was the first choice for the role, portrayed by Fay Wray in the original film, and no other actors were considered. In preparation for her role, Watts met with Wray, who was to make a cameo appearance and say the final line of dialogue. Wray died at the age of 96 during pre-production. King Kong proved to be Watts' most commercially successful film yet. Helmed by director Peter Jackson, who had made The Lord of the Rings, the film won high praise and grossed US$550 million worldwide (equivalent to US$906.7 million in 2025). The Seattle Post-Intelligencer praised Watts' performance: "The third act becomes a star-crossed, "Beauty and the Beast" parable far more operatic and tragic than anything the original filmmakers could have imagined, exquisitely pantomimed by Watts with a poignancy and passion that rates Oscar consideration." Watts reprised her role as Darrow in the video game adaptation of King Kong, for which her voice performance garnered her significant praise. She was nominated for a Spike Video Game Award for Best Performance by a Female. Watts and the game's other cast members also won an award for Best Cast. Her other 2005 film release was Marc Forster's psychological thriller Stay, alongside Ewan McGregor, Ryan Gosling and Bob Hoskins.

At this point in her career, Watts said the following:

You'd better know why you're here as an actor ... I'm here to work out my shit, what my problems are and know who I am, so by cracking open these characters perhaps that shines a light on it a little bit better ... I know myself. I mean, of course I know myself better but the journey and search continue because hopefully we're evolving and growing all the time.

In the romantic drama The Painted Veil (2006), based on the novel of the same name by Somerset Maugham, Watts played the daughter of a lawyer and his wife. She is under pressure to marry and chooses a physician (Edward Norton) known as a bacteriologist. She is not prepared when her husband goes to Hong Kong, then a British colony, for work and then forces her to mainland China to a region suffering a cholera epidemic. Comparing her portrayal with Greta Garbo's in the original movie adapted from the same novel, the San Francisco Chronicle wrote, "Watts makes the role work on her own terms–her Kitty is more desperate, more foolish, more miserable and more driven... and her spiritual journey is greater. Watts also provided the voice of a small role, Suzie Rabbit, in David Lynch's psychological thriller Inland Empire. In the same year, she was announced as the new face of the jewelers David Yurman and completed a photoshoot that was featured in the 2007 Pirelli Calendar.

In David Cronenberg's Eastern Promises (2007), Watts portrays a Russian-British midwife, opposite Viggo Mortensen. She delivers the baby of a drug-addicted 14-year old prostitute. In its review, Slate magazine observed that she "brings a wounded radiance to the overcurious midwife Anna. Though it's a bit of a one-note role, it's a note she's long specialised in, a kind of flustered moral aggrievement". Eastern Promises grossed US$56 million worldwide, (equivalent to US$92.3 million in 2025). Also that year she was a producer and starred in Michael Haneke's Funny Games (2007). She played a mother who, with her family, is held hostage by a pair of sociopathic teenagers. It was a remake of Haneke's 1997 film of the same name. According to the UK's The Daily Telegraph, the director said that he agreed to make the film on condition that he be allowed to cast Watts. The film was largely unnoticed by critics and audiences. Newsweek said that Watts "hurls herself into her physically demanding role with heroic conviction".

=== Biographical and independent films (2009–2014) ===
After a short hiatus from acting following the birth of her two children, Watts returned to acting in 2009, starring alongside Clive Owen in the political action thriller The International, in which she played a Manhattan assistant district attorney who partners with an Interpol agent to take down a merchant bank. The production was a moderate commercial success, grossing over US$60 million (equivalent to $90 million in 2025) worldwide. She next appeared in the drama Mother and Child, portraying the role of a lawyer who never knew her biological mother. ViewLondon found her to be "terrific as [her character], delivering a powerful performance that [...] isn't afraid to be unsympathetic". She was nominated for the Best Actress award at the Australian Film Institute Awards and for the Independent Spirit Award for Best Supporting Female.

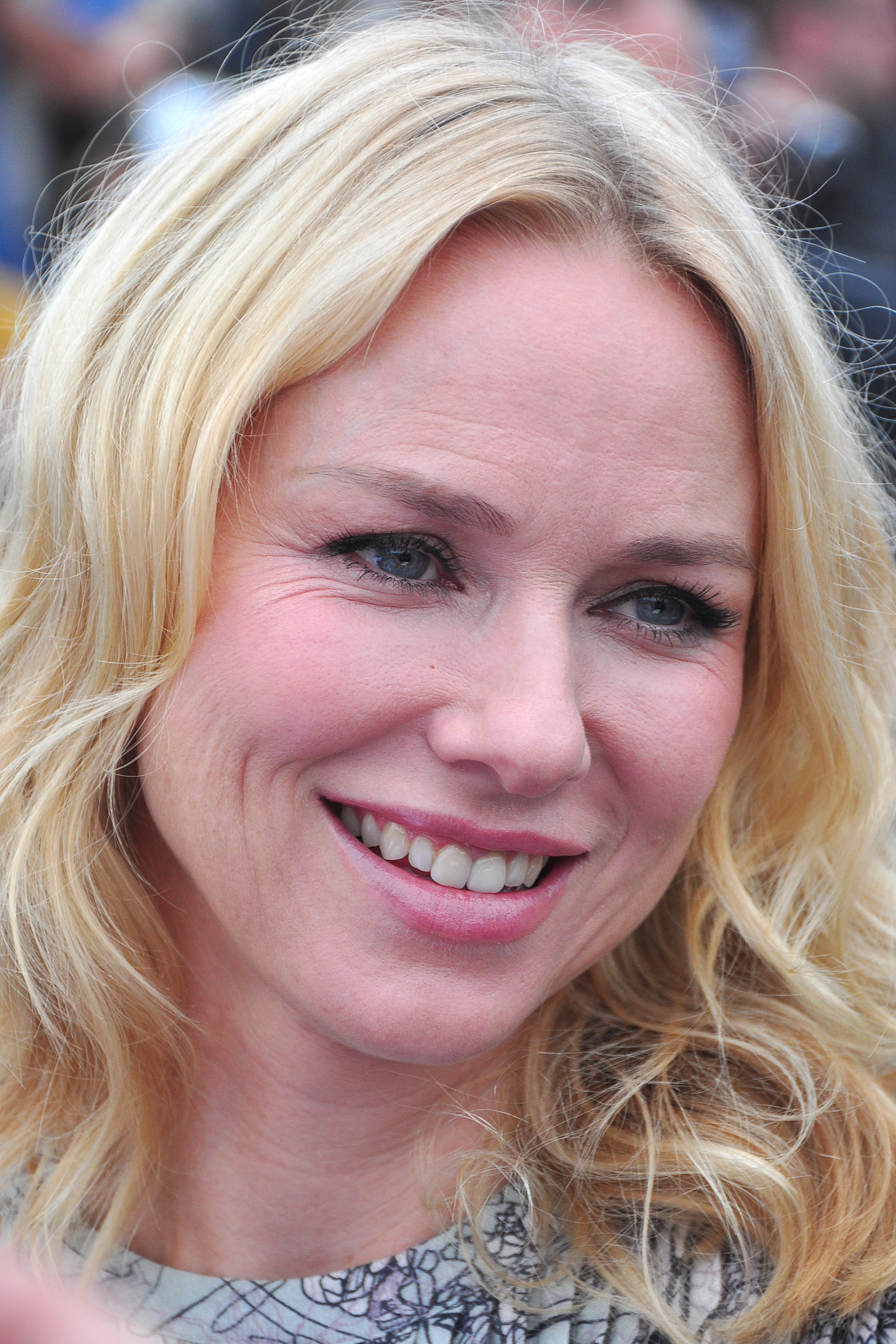
Watts at the Deauville American Film Festival in 2011

Her next film, the Woody Allen-directed dramedy You Will Meet a Tall Dark Stranger, opened at the 2010 Cannes Film Festival, and saw her portray Sally, a woman who has a troubled marriage with author Roy (played by Josh Brolin). It made over US$26 million (equivalent to $38.4 million in 2025). Her portrayal of Valerie Plame in the biographical thriller Fair Game followed, and marked the third pairing of Watts with Sean Penn after 21 Grams and The Assassination of Richard Nixon. The film earned Watts a Satellite Award nomination for Best Actress. In 2011, she appeared with Daniel Craig and Rachel Weisz in Jim Sheridan's psychological horror film Dream House, as the neighbour of a murdered family, and with Leonardo DiCaprio in Clint Eastwood's biographical drama J. Edgar, playing secretary Helen Gandy. While Dream House flopped, J. Edgar had a more favorable reception.

Watts starred in The Impossible (2012), a disaster drama based on the true story of María Belón and her family's experience of the 2004 Indian Ocean tsunami; she played the lead role, with her name changed to Maria Bennett. The film was a critical darling, had the highest-grossing opening weekend for a film in Spain, and made US$180.2 million (equivalent to $252.4 million in 2025) globally. Deborah Young of The Hollywood Reporter stated that "Watts packs a huge charge of emotion as the battered, ever-weakening Maria whose tears of pain and fear never appear fake or idealised," while Justin Chang of Variety magazine remarked that she "has few equals at conveying physical and emotional extremis, something she again demonstrates in a mostly bedridden role." Damon Wise of The Guardian felt that "Watts is both brave and vulnerable, and her scenes with the young Lucas [...] are among the film's best." Watts earned nominations for the Golden Globe Award for Best Actress in a Motion Picture – Drama and the Screen Actors Guild Award for Outstanding Performance by a Female Actor in a Leading Role, in addition to her second nomination for the Academy Award for Best Actress.

In Adore (2013), Watts starred with Robin Wright as two childhood friends who fall in love with each other's sons. On the film, critics concluded that Watts and Wright "give it their all, but they can't quite make Adore's trashy, absurd plot believable". She obtained the FCCA Award for Best Actress in 2014 for her role. The anthology comedy Movie 43 (2013) featured Watts as a devoted mother, alongside Liev Schreiber. Movie 43 was universally panned by critics, with Richard Roeper calling it "the Citizen Kane of awful".

In Laurie Collyer's independent drama Sunlight Jr. (2013), Watts starred with Matt Dillon as a struggling working-class couple. The San Francisco Chronicle, praising Watts and Dillon, wrote in its review for the film that they are "formidable actors at the top of their game here [...] exhibiting a remarkable chemistry". Watts portrayed the title role in Oliver Hirschbiegel's Diana (her final film released in 2013), a biographical drama about the last two years of the life of Diana, Princess of Wales. Released amid much controversy given its subject, the film was a critical flop. James Berardinelli found the film to be a "dull, pointless" production and remarked that while Watts did a "decent job encapsulating the look and feel of Diana", her portrayal was "a two-dimensional recreation".

Alejandro González Iñárritu's dark comedy Birdman or (The Unexpected Virtue of Ignorance) (2014) featured Watts as the actress of a play mounted by a faded Hollywood actor (played by Michael Keaton). The film was the subject of widespread acclaim, and won four awards at the 87th Academy Awards including Best Picture; Watts and the other cast members earned the Screen Actors Guild Award for Outstanding Cast in a Motion Picture. Her other two awaiting projects were screened at the 2014 Toronto International Film Festival. The dramedy St. Vincent starred Watts as a Russian prostitute. She learned the accent by spending time with Russian women in a West Village spa during a six-week period. Los Angeles Times reported a dividing reaction towards her performance, asserting that her part "put off some critics with its outrageousness", but "earned plenty of plaudits too". Watts earned a nomination for the Screen Actors Guild Award for Outstanding Performance by a Female Actor in a Supporting Role. In While We're Young, Watts starred with Ben Stiller as a New York City-based married couple who begin hanging out with a couple in their 20s. That film was an arthouse success and Watts received praise for her on-screen chemistry with Stiller.

=== Film and television work (2015–present) ===
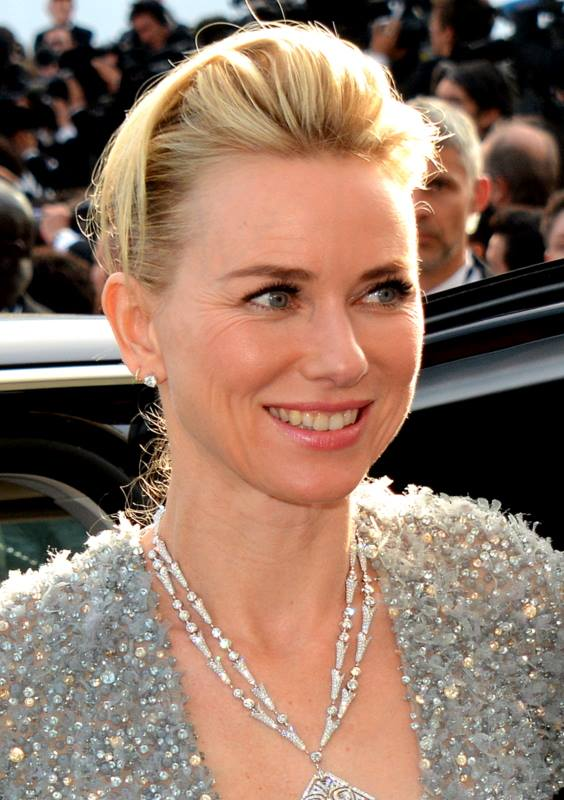
Watts at the 2015 Cannes Film Festival

Watts played rebel leader Evelyn Johnson-Eaton in Insurgent (2015), the second film in The Divergent Series, which is based on Veronica Roth's best-selling young adult novel of the same name. Despite mixed reviews, the film was a commercial success, grossing US$274.5 million worldwide. Watts reprised her role in the series's third instalment, Allegiant, released on 18 March 2016, to negative reviews and lackluster box office sales.

Watts starred in Gus Van Sant's mystery drama The Sea of Trees, opposite Matthew McConaughey, as the wife of an American man who attempts suicide in Mount Fuji's "Suicide Forest". The film premiered at the 2015 Cannes Film Festival where it competed for the Palme d'Or, but was heavily panned by both critics and audiences, who reportedly booed and laughed during its screening. Critic Richard Mowe stated the audience reaction should "give the film's creative team pause for reflection about exactly where they went so badly awry." Justin Chang of Variety also criticised the film, but commended Watts' performance for being "solidly moving and sometimes awesomely passive-aggressive." The Sea of Trees did not find an audience in theaters.

Like St. Vincent and While We're Young the previous year, Watts starred in two films—Demolition and Three Generations— which screened at the Toronto International Film Festival, in 2015. In Demolition, directed by Jean-Marc Vallée and opposite Jake Gyllenhaal, Watts played a customer service representative and the interest of a grieving investment banker (Gyllenhaal). The Wrap felt that she "empathetically captures [her] harried single mom" role as she played "both the wit and the sadness with grace". In Three Generations, directed by Gaby Dellal, she appeared with Susan Sarandon and Elle Fanning as the mother of a young transgender man (Fanning). Pulled from the schedule days before its intended initial release, the film subsequently opened on selected theatres in May 2017.

Watts played Linda, the second wife of heavyweight boxer Chuck Wepner (played by Liev Schreiber) in the biographical sport drama The Bleeder (2016), revolving around the life of Wepner and his 1975 fight with Muhammad Ali. Variety wrote in its review: "Slightly out of place as the feisty bartender who gives Wepner a second chance at his downest and outest, a spirited Naomi Watts nonetheless gives proceedings her best Amy Adams in The Fighter." She headlined the thriller Shut In (also 2016), playing a psychologist isolated with her child in a rural house during a winter storm. The film received largely negative reviews and made US$8 million worldwide.

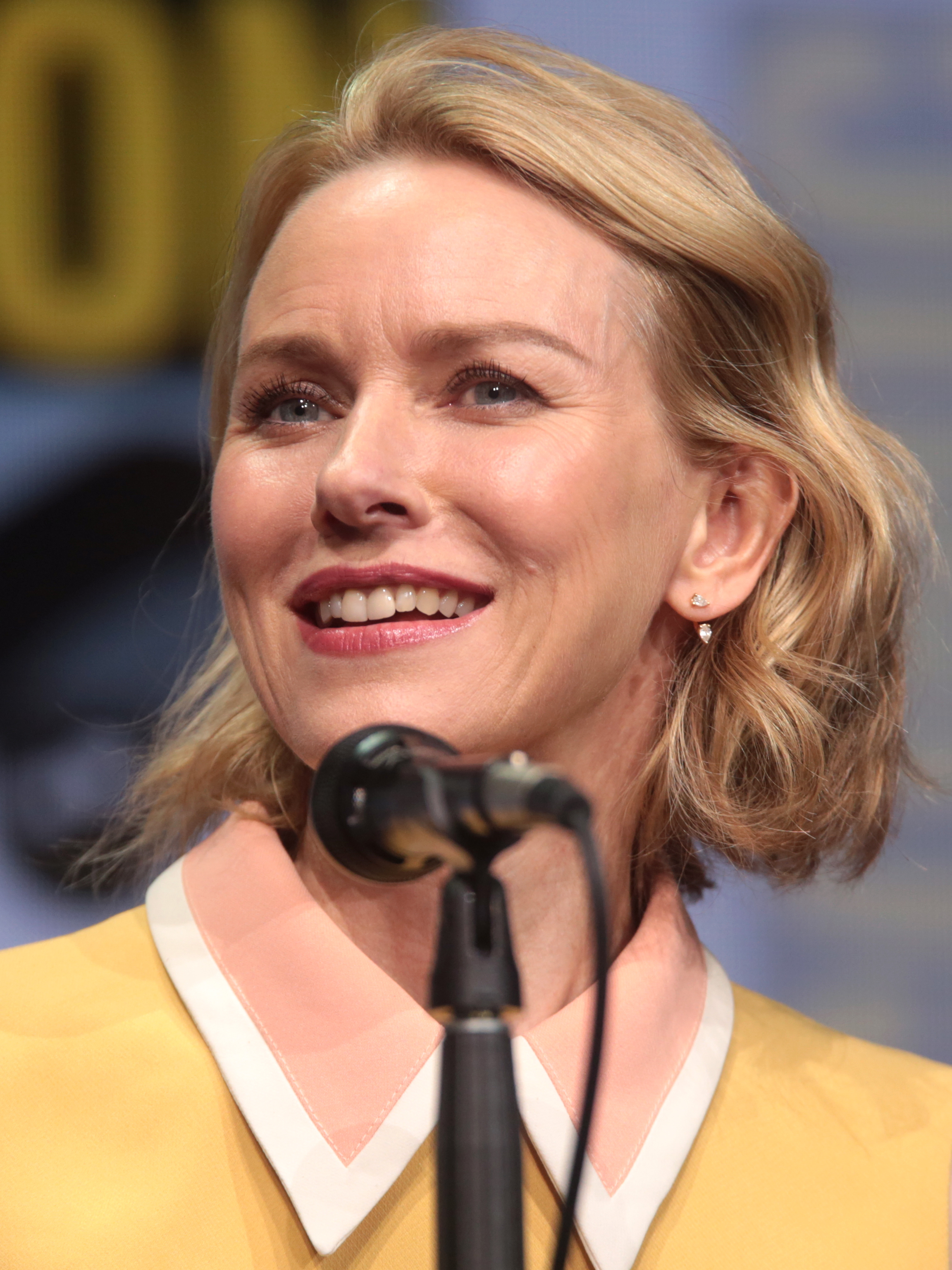
Watts in 2017

Watts appeared in Twin Peaks, a limited event television series and a continuation of the 1990 show of the same name. It was broadcast on Showtime in 2017, to critical acclaim. Watts starred as "a therapist who begins to develop dangerous and intimate relationships with the people in her patients' lives" in the Netflix drama series Gypsy (also 2017), and served as one of its executive producers. While response was mixed, Gypsy was cancelled by Netflix after one season. In The Book of Henry (2017), Watts portrayed the mother of young genius who plans save the girl next door from abuse. The film polarized critics and audiences, but Rolling Stone described her as "a plus in any movie" and found her to be "excellent" in the role. In her other 2017 film, The Glass Castle opposite Brie Larson, and Woody Harrelson. An adaptation of Jeannette Walls's best selling memoir of the same name, Watts played the nonconformist mother of the author.

She played Queen Gertrud in Ophelia. In 2019, Watts portrayed Gretchen Carlson in the Showtime miniseries The Loudest Voice based on the book The Loudest Voice in the Room about Roger Ailes's sexual harassment of Carlson. She next starred in the films Penguin Bloom, Boss Level, and This Is the Night. In 2022, Watts played a lead in Netflix's The Watcher as Nora Brannock alongside Bobby Cannavale, who played Dean Brannock. In 2024, she starred in the anthology series Feud: Capote vs. The Swans as Babe Paley, for which she received a Primetime Emmy Award for Outstanding Lead Actress in a Limited or Anthology Series or Movie nomination. In 2025, she received a Hollywood star.

In 2026, it was announced that filming would begin on "Margot & Rudy." The film tells the story of the relationship between Rudolf Nureyev and Margot Fonteyn. Naomi Watts will play Margot.

== Other work ==
Watts received an endorsement deal with David Yurman jewelry. She served as the ambassador to Thierry Mugler's Angel fragrance from 2008 until 2011 when Eva Mendes overtook the role. The pair later coincidentally fronted a campaign for Pantene hair care products. Watts also appeared in a campaign for Ann Taylor in 2010. She was announced as a new 'face' of L'Oréal in 2014. Watts also founded the skincare company Onda Beauty in 2016 and appeared in a campaign for Fendi in 2020.

In January 2021, it was announced that Watts was an early investor in Thirteen Lune, an e-commerce site focused on makeup, skincare, haircare and wellness products owned by people of color and ally brands. In October 2022, Watts launched Stripes, a beauty and wellness brand focused on menopause health. The brand was acquired by L Catterton in June 2024. In October 2024, Watts was announced as an ambassador and designer for Coyuchi linen.

Watts released her first book, Dare I Say It: Everything I Wish I'd Known About Menopause, on January 21, 2025.

== Philanthropy ==
In 2006, Watts became a goodwill ambassador for Joint United Nations Programme on HIV/AIDS, which helps raise awareness of issues relating to the disease. She has used her high profile and celebrity to bring attention to the needs of people living with this disease. Watts has featured in campaigns for fundraising, events and activities, including the 21st Annual AIDS Walk. On 1 December 2009, Watts met United Nations Secretary-General Ban Ki-moon at a public event commemorating World AIDS Day 2009.

In 2011, Watts attended a charity polo match in New York City along with Australian actors Hugh Jackman and Isla Fisher, which was intended to raise money to help victims of the 2010 Haiti earthquake. In 2012, she became an ambassador for Pantene's Beautiful Lengths, a programme that donates real-hair wigs to women with cancer. She has visited the St Vincent's Hospital in Sydney to meet some of the women the programme helps.

In 2016, Watts collaborated with Sportscraft and children's charity Barnardos to produce a range of namesake coats, with a percentage of sales going to the charity, and was one of the public figures photographed by Italian photographer Fabrizio Ferri for Bulgari's digital campaign "Raise Your Hand". In November 2018, she hosted the Worldwide Orphans 14th Annual Gala in NYC, and teamed up with McDonald's, to serve as a McHappy Day ambassador, making a special appearance and stepping behind the counter in Haberfield, Sydney.

== Personal life ==
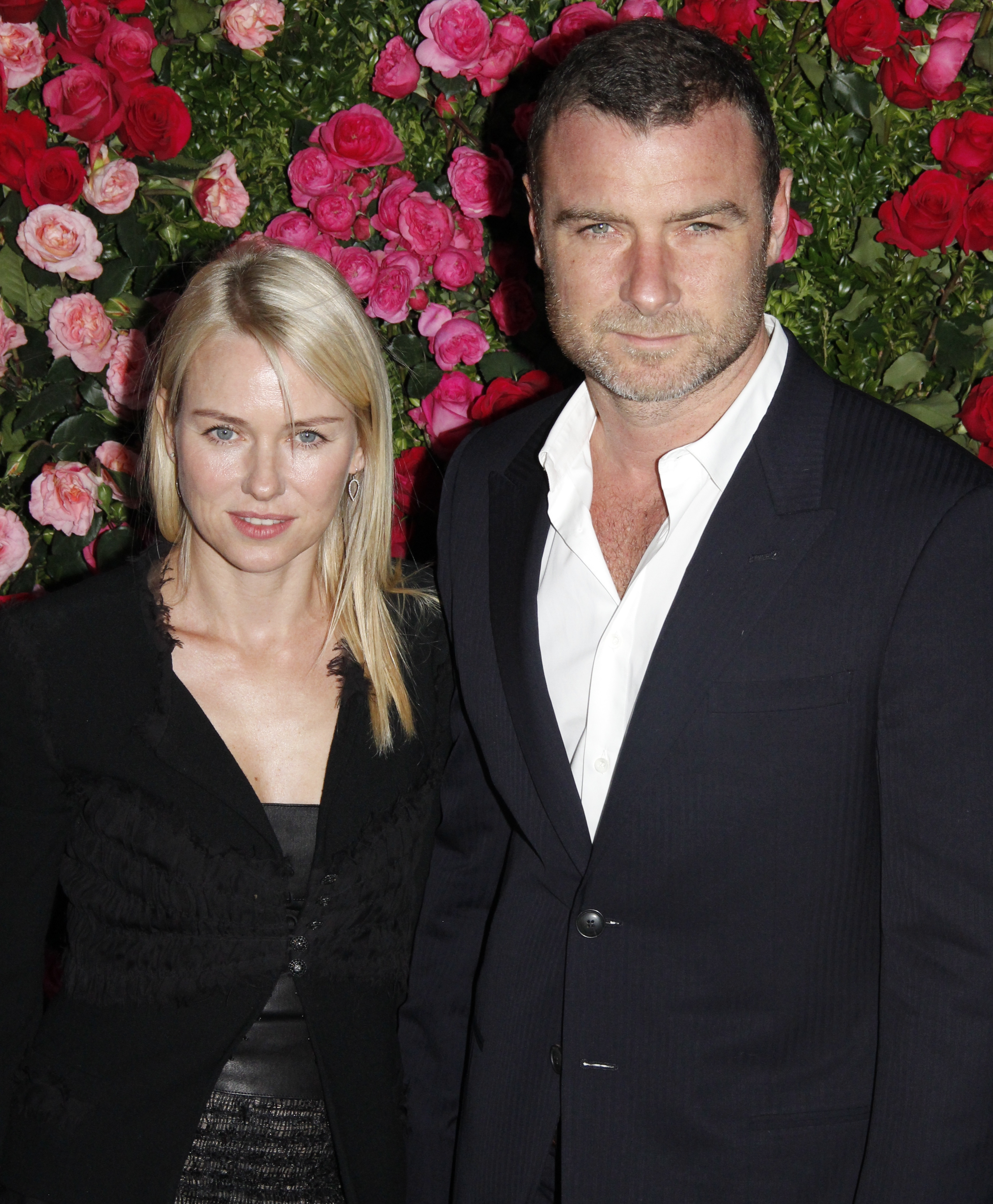
Watts with her then-partner Liev Schreiber in 2012

Watts converted to Buddhism after becoming interested in the religion during the shooting of The Painted Veil (2006), and became a proponent of Transcendental Meditation.

Watts was in a relationship with Australian actor Heath Ledger from 2002 to 2004. In 2005, she began a relationship with American actor Liev Schreiber. Their son was born in 2007, and their daughter, Kai Schreiber, who is transgender, was born in 2008. (Note: Attributed to multiple references:) Watts and Schreiber separated in 2016. The following year, Watts began dating American actor Billy Crudup, after they met on the set of the Netflix drama series Gypsy. Watts and Crudup married on June 9, 2023.

In 2016, Watts became the honorary president of the Welsh football club Glantraeth F.C. The club is in Malltraeth, Anglesey, near her grandparents' farm, where she spent time as a child.

== See also ==
- List of Academy Award winners and nominees from Great Britain
- List of actors with Academy Award nominations
- List of actors with more than one Academy Award nomination in the acting categories
- List of British actors
