= Australian Film Institute International Award for Best Actress =

Australian film award

The Australian Film Institute International Award for Best Actress was an award in the annual Australian Film Institute Awards (by AFI). It was awarded from 2005 to 2010. The award has been superseded by the AFI's AACTA International Award for Best Actress.

== Previous winners and nominees ==
- 2005: Emily Browning - Lemony Snicket's A Series of Unfortunate Events
- 2006: Rachel Griffiths - Six Feet Under
  - Toni Collette - In Her Shoes
  - Naomi Watts - King Kong
  - Radha Mitchell - Silent Hill
- 2007: Rose Byrne - Damages
  - Toni Collette - Little Miss Sunshine
  - Jacinda Barrett - The Last Kiss
  - Rachel Griffiths - Brothers & Sisters
- 2008: Cate Blanchett - Elizabeth: The Golden Age
  - Judy Davis - The Starter Wife
  - Rachel Griffiths - Brothers & Sisters
  - Nicole Kidman - The Golden Compass
- 2009: Toni Collette - United States of Tara
  - Rose Byrne - Damages
  - Melissa George - In Treatment
  - Mia Wasikowska - In Treatment
- 2010: Mia Wasikowska - Alice in Wonderland
  - Toni Collette - United States of Tara, Season 2.
  - Bojana Novakovic - Edge of Darkness
  - Naomi Watts - Mother and Child
