= Ehren Kruger =

American film screenwriter and producer

- Born: October 5, 1972 (age 53); Alexandria, Virginia, U.S.
- Occupations: Screenwriter, film producer
- Years active: 1998–present

Ehren Kruger (born October 5, 1972) is an American film screenwriter and producer. He is best known for writing three of the five installments in the original Transformers film series: Revenge of the Fallen, Dark of the Moon, and Age of Extinction, in addition to the American version of The Ring and its sequel The Ring Two and the American adaptation of Ghost in the Shell.

For his work on Top Gun: Maverick, Kruger was nominated for the Academy Award for Best Adapted Screenplay.

== Life and career ==
Kruger was raised in Alexandria, Virginia, and attended the Thomas Jefferson High School for Science and Technology, graduating in 1990. He graduated from the New York University Tisch School of the Arts in 1993 with a Bachelor of Fine Arts degree.

His produced screenplays include Arlington Road, Scream 3 and Reindeer Games. He was nominated for the Bram Stoker Award for Best Screenplay for The Ring.

He also did uncredited rewrites to Scream 4, when Kevin Williamson had to leave production.

Early on in his career after writing the screenplay Arlington Road, he received the Nicholl Fellowship from the Academy of Motion Picture Arts and Sciences in 1996. Kruger wrote the script of the television series adaptation of Terry Gilliam's film The Brothers Grimm.

== Filmography ==
Year	Title	Writer	Producer	Notes
1998	Killers in the House	Yes	No	Television film
1999	Arlington Road	Yes	No	
1999	New World Disorder	Yes	No	Co-wrote with Jeffrey Smith
2000	Scream 3	Yes	No	
2000	Reindeer Games	Yes	No	
2001	Impostor	Yes	No	Co-wrote with Caroline Case and David Twohy
2002	The Ring	Yes	No	
2005	Rings	Yes	No	Short film Co-wrote with Jonathan Liebesman
2005	The Ring Two	Yes	No	
2005	The Skeleton Key	Yes	No	
2005	The Brothers Grimm	Yes	No	
2007	Blood & Chocolate	Yes	Executive	Co-wrote with Christopher B. Landon
2009	Transformers: Revenge of the Fallen	Yes	No	Co-wrote with Roberto Orci and Alex Kurtzman
2011	Scream 4	Uncredited	Executive	
2011	Transformers: Dark of the Moon	Yes	No	
2011	Dream House	No	Yes	
2014	Transformers: Age of Extinction	Yes	No	
2017	Rings	No	Executive	
2017	Ghost in the Shell	Yes	No	Co-wrote with Jamie Moss and William Wheeler
2018	Ophelia	No	Yes	
2019	Dumbo	Yes	Yes	
2022	Top Gun: Maverick	Yes	No	Co-wrote with Eric Warren Singer and Christopher McQuarrie
2025	F1	Yes	No	Also co-story writer with Joseph Kosinski

Actor

- Still Screaming: The Ultimate Scary Movie Retrospective (2011) (Documentary film, himself)
