= Rachel Keller =

- The Ring character
- First appearance: The Ring; 2002
- Last appearance: The Ring Two; 2005
- Created by: Ehren Kruger
- Portrayed by: Naomi Watts

In-universe information
- Occupation: Journalist
- Children: Aidan (son)

Rachel Keller is a fictional character in The Ring film series. The character, created by writer-producer Ehren Kruger and portrayed by Naomi Watts, serves as the protagonist of The Ring and The Ring Two, sharing similarities with Reiko Asakawa from the original Japanese films.

Introduced in the 2002 film, Rachel is an investigative journalist who tries to figure out a way to escape death after watching a cursed video tape that she discovered while investigating the death of her niece. In The Ring Two, Rachel delves into the history of Samara Morgan after her son gets sick with a mysterious ailment.

== Appearances ==
In The Ring, Rachel Keller, an investigative journalist, is asked by her sister Ruth to investigate the mysterious circumstances behind her niece Katie's death. She informs Rachel that she found her daughter's distorted corpse in the closet and that her official cause of death was a heart attack, despite Katie being a healthy teenager. Katie's friends tell Rachel about the legend of the cursed videotape and that Becca, Katie's friend, was institutionalized after witnessing Katie's death. She also discovers that Katie's boyfriend and two of her friends all died in bizarre accidents on the same night at 10 PM. Rachel travels to Shelter Mountain Inn and stays at Cabin 12, the same cabin where Katie and her friends watched the cursed videotape. Rachel finds the mysterious tape and watches it, after which the phone rings. Rachel hears a voice utter "seven days". Rachel seeks help from her ex-boyfriend Noah Clay, a video analyst. Later, Rachel discovers that Aidan, her son with Noah, watched the tape just as Noah calls her and tells her that he believes her. Rachel researches the lighthouse from the tape and discovers that it was located in Moesko Island, the home of an ill-fated horse breeder named Anna Morgan, who appeared on the cursed videotape. After investigating, Rachel discovers Anna had an adopted daughter named Samara, who possessed the power to burn disturbing images into the minds of people, animals and objects. Rachel meets Anna's widower Richard, but he makes her leave when she begins to ask questions about Samara.

She then speaks to the island's physician, Dr. Grasnik, who explains that Anna experienced horrible visions and dreams after Samara began burning gruesome images into her mind. Rachel watches the missing medical footage, which was revealed to be Samara explaining her powers to her psychiatrist. As the footage ends, Richard abruptly strikes her in the head and subsequently commits suicide by electrocuting himself in the bathtub. Noah arrives and they discover an image of the same tree found in both Shelter Mountain Inn and the cursed videotape beneath the wallpaper in the attic of a horse barn, where Samara was kept to prevent her from inflicting harm onto others. Returning to Shelter Mountain Inn, they discover a well beneath the floorboards of Cabin 12. Rachel accidentally falls into the well, where she receives a vision revealing that Anna suffocated Samara with a plastic bag and throwing her into the well, where she survived for seven days. Finding Samara's skeletal remains, Rachel discovers that the time she was supposed to be killed by the curse has passed, and she and Noah return home, believing the curse is finally broken. However, Aidan makes her realize the curse is never ending. Samara's malignant spirit emerges from Noah's TV and kills him, with Rachel arriving too late to save him. She realizes that she had been spared after making a copy of the video and passing the copy to Noah. Rachel decides to save Aidan by making a copy of the initial copy she sent to Noah so that he can save himself by showing someone else the tape.

The Ring Two takes place six months after the first film. Rachel and Aidan have moved to Astoria from Seattle. Rachel works at The Daily Astorian for editor Max Rourke. Rachel learns of a local teen's death and begins investigating; from the horrified expression on the boy's face, she deduces that Samara is involved. Sure enough, Samara appears, declaring that she has been looking for her. Rachel obtains the videotape and burns it. Aidan encounters Samara in a nightmare and he starts developing hypothermia and bruises on his arms. At a county fair, Aidan takes photographs of his reflection, where Samara appears. Rachel realizes Aidan may be possessed by Samara. Max allows Rachel and Aidan to stay with him and while attempting to give Aidan a bath, Samara causes the water to recede from the bath, replacing Aidan, grabbing Rachel, who tries to drown Samara.

Max enters, mistakenly believing that she is trying to drown Aidan, and forces her to take her son to the hospital. Samara takes control of Aidan's body and telepathically forces Dr. Temple to commit suicide. Rachel arrives, discovering Aidan waiting for her, but with uncharacteristic affection. Rachel falls asleep, dreaming of Aidan, who tells her that she will have to exorcise Samara. Upon awakening, Rachel drugs Samara with sleeping pills and places her in the bath to temporarily drown Aidan in order to exorcise her. Samara is removed, but appears in the television. Rachel allows herself to be dragged into Samara's monochromatic world. Finding herself in the bottom of the well Samara died in, Rachel discovers the lid is partially open. Rachel escapes the well, sealing Samara inside. Wandering through the woods, she comes to the cliff where Samara's adoptive mother Anna committed suicide. Hearing Aidan's voice, Rachel throws herself off the cliff into the sea, awakening back in the real world, and reunites with Aidan.

== Development ==
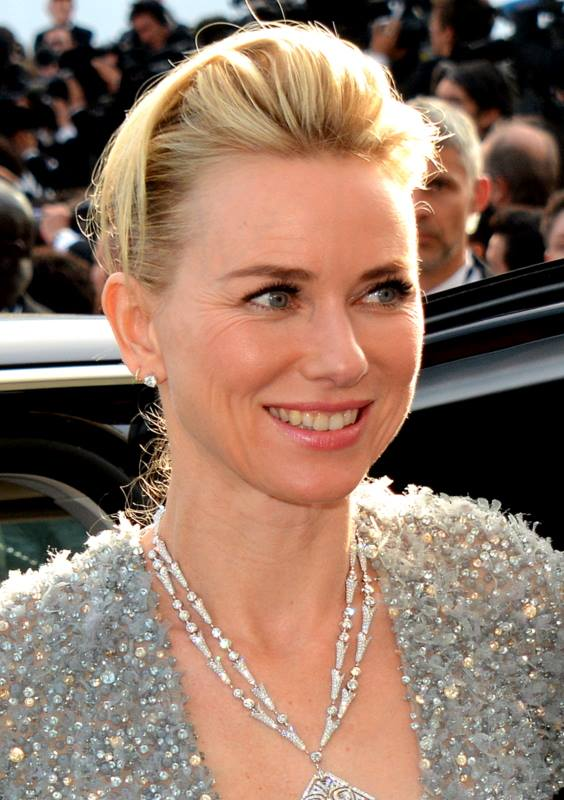
Naomi Watts portrays Rachel in both The Ring and The Ring Two.

In an interview, Watts revealed that she was originally hesitant to accept the role because she feared being typecast and discussed her character: "It's such a great role, especially the protagonist being female when that kind of part is normally reserved for the guys. She gets to go through such an incredible journey, not just with the struggle and chaos that's happening around her, but her own personal journey. I like her complexities and the fact that she thinks everything's OK because she's not fighting with her son. She then discovers that throughout the journey that she needs to be a better mum, has a moment to reflect and think: OK I've learned something through this, which I liked". In another interview, Watts discussed her character saying that "it was the character that drew me to this project" and elaborated further by saying: "What I think sets it apart, is that the character has her own personal journey to go through. She starts out as a flawed person and not a very good mother, and after all the chaos, she learns to recognize what her child needs".

Following the success of the 2002 film, Naomi Watts revealed that she was contractually obligated to star in The Ring Two, stating that she "didn't have the power of choice" but said that she did not have any second thoughts about reprising her role as Rachel stating that her character "had a lot more substance and it was about confronting the situation, the psychological aspects to it, and moral dilemmas, which I think have come up again in the sequel. They took a long time with the script, DreamWorks are very clever people, they know how to make it right and they persisted. We have a great director, who directed the original one, and we have a great cast. I think there is always that fear of doing any sequel but we took our time in trying to make it the best we could, while also give a nod to the audience".

In an interview with BBC, Gore Verbinski discussed Watts performance: "Naomi's great. She's completely dedicated to her performance and not to her image. That process allows her to become Rachel in this movie and go to some darker areas that I think a lot of actors wouldn't feel comfortable doing". While discussing Rachel's character arc in The Ring Two, Watts said: "Well, emotionally she's obviously in a very different place. And, you know, she's living with this enormous guilt and, there's no one she can talk to. What have I done? Did I do the right thing? She needs so much to, share a connection with somebody else. But she can't, she's too ashamed and so, it's just her and her son. So, the best thing she thinks she can do is move to another environment and create almost a whole new identity".

== Reception ==
In Misfit Sisters: Screen Horror as Female Rites of Passage, S. Short discusses the distinctiveness of the character noting that "the woman responsible for investigating the murder mystery at the heart of The Ring is not led by visions or intuition, but by her instincts as a journalist working for the Seattle Correspondent". In Heroes of Film, Comics and American Culture: Essays on Real and Fictional Defenders of Home, Lisa M. DeTora states:

"Rachel's journalistic demeanor gives way to a more desperate and motherly heroism as she tries to save her loved ones while discovering exactly why the Morgans killed Samara. Thus, Rachel is called on to investigate the death of a family member, to pay more attention to her son and his father, and to unearth the horrible tragedy of a murdered child. These missions have the painful effect of extracting heroic compassion from her. To justify this "extraction", Rachel is originally presented as a "bad mother" and an "over-bearing employee". Her first scene clearly depicts this "inappropriate" attunement to motherhood".

Leigh Kolb from IndieWire notes that the "ambiguous ending suggests that Rachel may indeed save her son, but will have to harm another to do so. This idea of motherly self-sacrifice portrays the one way that Rachel–single, working mother–can redeem herself". Sarah Crocker ranked Rachel 13th on her list of 13 Horror Movie Heroines That Kick Butt. Paul Clinton of CNN.com praised Watts' performance, stating that she "is excellent in this leading role, which proves that her stellar performance in Mulholland Drive was not a fluke. She strikes a perfect balance between scepticism and the slow realisation of the truth in regard to the deadly power of the videotape". In a post for AMC, Stacie Ponder wrote: "One of the things I like about Rachel Keller (Naomi Watts) in Gore Verbinski's The Ring is that she wasn't the best mom in the world. She didn't neglect her weirdo kid, Aidan (David Dorfman), but she was concerned first and foremost with her own life and her own career".

== In popular culture ==
Rachel is the protagonist of the fan film RINGwhispers. In this short film, Rachel returns to Moesko Island after discovering that several teenagers have mysteriously disappeared there.
