= The Ring Two =

2005 American film directed by Hideo Nakata

- Theatrical release poster
- Directed by: Hideo Nakata
- Written by: Ehren Kruger
- Based on: Ring by Koji Suzuki
- Produced by: Walter F. Parkes; Laurie MacDonald
- Starring: Naomi Watts; Simon Baker; David Dorfman; Elizabeth Perkins; Sissy Spacek
- Cinematography: Gabriel Beristain
- Edited by: Michael N. Knue
- Music by: Henning Lohner (Note: Original themes composed by Hans Zimmer.); Martin Tillman
- Production companies: Parkes/MacDonald Productions; BenderSpink, Inc.
- Distributed by: DreamWorks Pictures
- Release date: March 18, 2005
- Running time: 110 minutes
- Country: United States
- Language: English
- Budget: $50 million
- Box office: $164 million

The Ring Two is a 2005 American supernatural horror film directed by Hideo Nakata and written by Ehren Kruger. It is the second installment in the American Ring series, based on the 1991 novel by Koji Suzuki. Naomi Watts and David Dorfman reprise their roles from the first film, with Simon Baker, Elizabeth Perkins, and Sissy Spacek joining the cast. It also marks the feature film debut of Mary Elizabeth Winstead.

The Ring Two was theatrically released in the United States on March 18, 2005, by DreamWorks Pictures. The film received mixed reviews from critics, and grossed $164 million against a $50 million budget. A direct sequel to the first film, Rings, was released in 2017.

== Plot ==
Six months after the first film and the short film Rings, Samara Morgan's cursed videotape has been circulating through Astoria, Oregon. Jake Pierce is on his seventh day after watching the cursed videotape. Desperate, he convinces a schoolmate Emily to watch it. While Emily supposedly watches the tape, he briefly steps into his kitchen. Jake receives a phone call and is relieved to realize it is only his friend, with whom he had planned to trick Emily into watching the tape. Suddenly, Jake notices dark liquid pouring from under the kitchen door and runs outside to the living room, only to discover Emily closed her eyes while watching the tape. Jake is then promptly murdered by Samara.

Rachel Keller and her 9-year-old son, Aidan, have moved to Astoria from Seattle. Rachel works at The Daily Astorian for editor Max Rourke. Rachel learns of Jake's death, inspecting his body, only for Samara to appear, declaring that she has been looking for her. Rachel breaks into Jake's house, obtains the videotape, and burns it. Aidan experiences a nightmare where Samara drags him into a television. He soon starts developing hypothermia and bruises on his arms. At a county fair, Aidan wanders into a restroom and takes photographs of his reflection, where Samara appears. Rachel takes him home but wild deer attack them on the way. Rachel believes Aiden to be very sick with his temperature being unusually low. Strange things begin to happen at home. Alarms go off, burners turn on, cabinets open. Rachel rushes to get Aiden out of the home when she realizes Samara may possess Aiden. She takes him to her office at the newspaper to keep Aiden safe.

Max takes them in. While Rachel attempts to bathe Aidan, he develops aquaphobia. Rachel leaves Aiden with Max while he takes a bath. She returns home to pick up some of Aidens items. She looks at the camera films and realizes Samara was with Aiden early in the day in the public restroom when he disappeared. Rachel returns to Max's home when they realize the bathroom door is locked and water is spilling from the room. Unable to open the door, Max goes to find a tool to open the door. Rachel is able to open the door and watches Samara causing the water to recede from the bath, replacing Aidan with herself, and terrorizing Rachel so that she tries to drown Samara. Max enters, seeing her drowning Aidan instead, and forces her to take her son to the hospital. Rachel explains to Max what is happening to them and that Samara is after Aiden not to hurt him but to become him. Max doesn't believe her but she urges to take his picture to see Samara.

Based on Aidan's bruises, psychiatrist Emma Temple suspects child abuse on the part of Rachel. Dr. Temple questions Rachel and her previous Post Partum Depressions diagnosed when Aiden was born and asks if she's ever tried to hurt Aiden. Dr. Temple tells her she cannot be left alone with Aiden and she escorts her to her office to question her further. Left unattended, Rachel leaves through a window looking for answers, Rachel returns to Moesko Island, finding evidence of Samara's biological mother Evelyn, who tried to drown her as an infant. Rachel visits Evelyn in a psychiatric hospital, who advises her to "listen to her baby".

In the hospital, Aidan, possessed by Samara, kills Dr. Temple. Police officers see the murder and Aidan runs away and then returns to Max's house. Max arrives, suspects foul play, and tries to take photos of Aidan secretly. Rachel arrives, discovering an affectionate Aidan waiting for her, but acting suspiciously out of character. She steps outside, finding Max's corpse in his truck. Rachel falls asleep, dreaming of Aidan, who tells her she must exorcise Samara. Upon awakening, Rachel drugs Samara with sleeping pills and places her in the bath to temporarily drown Aidan to exorcise her.

Samara is removed but appears on the television. Rachel allows herself to be dragged into Samara's monochromatic world. Finding herself in the bottom of the well Samara died in, Rachel discovers the lid is partially open. She scales the well's walls, pursued by Samara, but escapes by climbing out and pushing the lid shut on Samara, locking her out of her and Aidan's lives. Wandering through the woods, she comes to the cliff where Samara's adoptive mother Anna committed suicide. Hearing Aidan's voice, Rachel falls off the cliff and into the water, returning to the real world and reuniting with Aidan.

== Cast ==
- Naomi Watts as Rachel Keller
- David Dorfman as Aidan
- Simon Baker as Max Rourke
- Kelly Stables as Samara Morgan
  - Daveigh Chase appears as the human Samara Morgan via archive footage
- Sissy Spacek as Evelyn Borden
  - Mary Elizabeth Winstead as young Evelyn Borden
- Elizabeth Perkins as Dr. Emma Temple
- Gary Cole as Martin Savide
- Ryan Merriman as Jake Pierce
- Emily VanCamp as Emily
- Kelly Overton as Betsy
- James Lesure as Doctor
- Chane't Johnson as Adoption Counselor

== Production ==
Hideo Nakata, director of the original Ring, directed this film in place of Gore Verbinski. Noam Murro was also involved before Nakata, but left due to creative differences. The film was shot in Astoria, Oregon, and Los Angeles, California.

== Release and Reception ==
The Ring Two was originally intended to be released in the United States on November 10, 2004, but was pushed back to March 18, 2005.

=== Critical reception ===
On the review aggregator website Rotten Tomatoes, the film has an approval rating of 21% based on 187 reviews, with an average rating of 4.44/10. The site's critical consensus states: "Ring Two serves up horror clichés, and not even Hideo Nakata, the director of the film from which this one is based, can save Ring Two from a dull screenplay full of absurdities". Metacritic assigned the film a weighted average score of 44 out of 100 based on 37 critics, indicating "mixed or average reviews".

Roger Ebert considered it better than the first film, giving it 2½ stars: "The charm of The Ring Two, while limited, is real enough; it is based on the film's ability to make absolutely no sense, while nevertheless generating a real enough feeling of tension a good deal of the time".

Audiences polled by CinemaScore gave the film an average grade of "C+" on an A+ to F scale.

== Home media ==
In the unrated edition DVD release, a few extra scenes were included that were not in the theatrical release. These scenes include conversations with Rachel's new neighbor (and neighborhood gossip), numerous additions in which Max shows a romantic interest in Rachel, more scenes with Samara prior to her possession of Aidan (including one in which she is shown to enter him in the restroom at the local fair), and an extended opening scene. However, the scene in the theatrical cut in which Aidan first encounters a deer while wandering the local fair (prior to the deer attack) has been removed from this version. The scene when the power went out was changed with a scene of the lights in Aidan's room going on and off, as well as the oven downstairs catching fire. Also, some musical cues were changed such as when Samara leaps out of the well in the opening scene.

The short film Rings (2005) (which was also included on a special edition of The Ring released just before The Ring Two arrived in theaters) was also included on the unrated DVD. The film officially debuted on Blu-ray on October 26, 2012, in Japan, containing all the extras from the DVD and including the Unrated Cut. The film was released on Blu-ray and 4K UHD in the United States for the first time on March 19, 2024, by Scream Factory as part of The Ring Collection, containing both its theatrical and unrated cuts.

== See also ==
- List of ghost films
- List of Ring characters
