= The Ring (2002 film) =

2002 film directed by Gore Verbinski

- Theatrical release poster
- Directed by: Gore Verbinski
- Screenplay by: Ehren Kruger
- Based on: Ring by Hiroshi Takahashi; Ring by Koji Suzuki
- Produced by: Walter F. Parkes; Laurie MacDonald
- Starring: Naomi Watts; Martin Henderson; Brian Cox
- Cinematography: Bojan Bazelli
- Edited by: Craig Wood
- Music by: Hans Zimmer
- Production companies: MacDonald/Parkes Productions; BenderSpink
- Distributed by: DreamWorks Pictures
- Release date: October 18, 2002 (United States)
- Running time: 115 minutes
- Country: United States
- Language: English
- Budget: $48 million
- Box office: $249.3 million

The Ring is a 2002 American supernatural horror film directed by Gore Verbinski and written by Ehren Kruger. It stars Naomi Watts, Martin Henderson, David Dorfman, and Brian Cox. The film follows Rachel Keller (Watts), a journalist who discovers a cursed VHS tape that causes its viewers to die seven days later.

It was produced by Walter F. Parkes and Laurie MacDonald, with Roy Lee, Mike Macari, and Michele Weisler serving as executive producers. The film is the first installment in the American Ring series and a remake of the 1998 Japanese film, itself based on the 1991 novel by Koji Suzuki. Principal photography took place from November 2001 to April 2002, primarily in the State of Washington, with cinematographer Bojan Bazelli. During post-production, editing was completed by Craig Wood and the score was composed by Hans Zimmer.

The Ring was theatrically released in the United States on October 18, 2002, by DreamWorks Pictures. It received mixed-to-positive reviews from critics and grossed $249.3 million at the worldwide box office. The film won Best Horror Film and Best Actress (for Watts) at the 29th Saturn Awards. The film's success inspired American remakes of several other Asian and Japanese films, including The Grudge (2004) and Dark Water (2005).

== Plot ==
Teenage girls Katie and Becca discuss an urban legend about a cursed videotape that causes whoever views it to die a week later. That night, Katie, who viewed it one week ago with her friends, is killed by an unseen force.

At Katie's funeral, Ruth—Katie's mother—asks her sister Rachel, a Seattle-based journalist, to investigate her daughter's death. Rachel discovers that Katie's friends all died in bizarre accidents at the same time as Katie's death. Rachel visits Shelter Mountain Inn, where Katie and her friends saw the tape. She finds and views the tape, which contains strange and frightening imagery. Immediately after viewing the tape, the phone rings. When Rachel answers, the unknown caller whispers, "Seven days". Though initially skeptical, Rachel quickly begins to experience supernatural occurrences linked to the tape.

Rachel recruits the help of her video analyst ex-husband Noah. He views the tape and Rachel makes him a copy. She identifies a woman on the tape: horse breeder Anna Morgan, who killed herself after some of her horses drowned themselves off Moesko Island. Rachel and Noah's 8-year-old son Aidan watches the tape.

Rachel heads for Moesko Island to speak to Anna's widower Richard. On the way, a horse aboard the ferry kills itself by jumping overboard. Rachel discovers that Anna, after four consecutive miscarriages, adopted a young girl named Samara, who possessed the ability to psychically etch images onto objects and into people's minds. Samara tormented her parents and their horses. Meanwhile, Noah travels to Eola Psychiatric Hospital and finds a file on Samara, which contains a missing video last seen by Richard.

Returning to the Morgan home, Rachel finds a fake birth certificate proving that Samara is not the biological child of Richard and Anna. She also discovers the missing video, where Samara apologizes for her actions but explains that "they won't stop". Richard insists that Samara is evil and electrocutes himself. Noah and Rachel find a loft in the barn, which the Morgans used to isolate Samara from themselves and the outside world. Rachel recognizes an image of a tree behind the wallpaper as a tree located at the Shelter Mountain Inn.

They return to Shelter Mountain Inn, led to a well beneath the floorboards. Rachel falls inside and experiences a vision of Anna dumping Samara into the well, where she survived for one week. Samara's body surfaces from the water. After Rachel is rescued, they arrange a proper burial for Samara.

Back home, Aidan warns Rachel that it was a mistake to help Samara. Rachel realizes that Noah's week is up. Samara's ghost crawls out of his TV screen and kills him. Rachel realizes that Samara's apology was actually a confession, and that she was only spared since she made a copy of the cursed video and passed it to Aidan, fulfilling Samara's goal of killing endlessly. She helps Aidan make a copy of the tape and refuses to answer his question on what would happen to the person who watches it.

== Cast ==
- Naomi Watts as Rachel Keller
- Martin Henderson as Noah Clay
- David Dorfman as Aidan Keller
- Daveigh Chase as Samara Morgan
- Brian Cox as Richard Morgan
- Shannon Cochran as Anna Morgan
- Jane Alexander as Dr. Grasnik
- Lindsay Frost as Ruth Embry
- Amber Tamblyn as Katie Embry
- Rachael Bella as Becca Kotler
- Pauley Perrette as Beth

== Production ==
=== Development and casting ===
The Ring went into production without a completed script. Ehren Kruger wrote three drafts of the screenplay before Scott Frank came on to do an uncredited re-write. Gore Verbinski was initially inspired to do a remake of Ring after Walter F. Parkes sent him a VHS copy of the Japanese film, which he described as "intriguing", "pulp" and "avant-garde". The original WGA-approved credits listed Hiroshi Takahashi (writer of the original 1998 screenplay for Ring), but his name is absent from the final print.

Several high-profile actresses were offered the lead role, including Gwyneth Paltrow, Jennifer Connelly and Kate Beckinsale. Verbinski admitted to not wanting to cast "big stars" as he wanted his film to be "discovered" and described the wave of harsh criticism from hardcore fans of the original Japanese film as "inevitable", although he expressed desire for them to find the remake equally compelling. He also sought to retain the minimalism prevalent throughout Ring and set it in Seattle, due to its "wet and isolated" atmosphere.

=== Filming ===
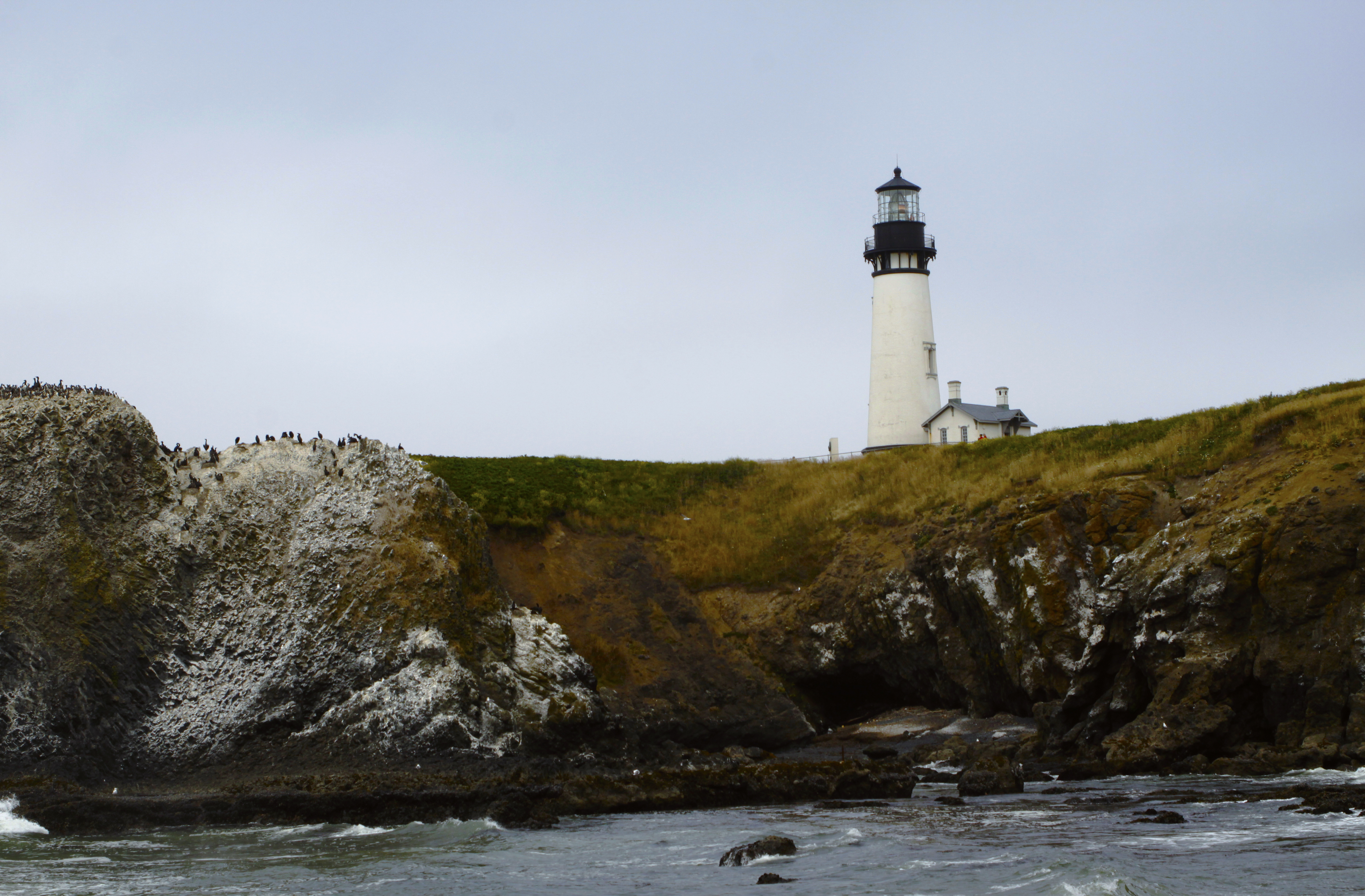
The Yaquina Head Lighthouse on the Oregon Coast was used as the setting for the "Moesko Island Lighthouse".

The Ring was filmed in 2001, primarily in the State of Washington in numerous locations, including Seattle, Port Townsend, Whidbey Island, Bellingham, Monroe and Stanwood. The Yaquina Head Lighthouse in Newport, Oregon, was also used as a filming location, as well as Oregon's Columbia River Gorge.

Chris Cooper played a murderer in two scenes meant to bookend the film, but was ultimately cut.

Cinematographer Bojan Bazelli used soft lighting and a grey blue-green color. Shot on film, the production is unusual for achieving its color correction in-camera using 81EF and one of two green filters, (Note: The source writes '85EFs' here, which do not exist; a likely typo. The green filters are specified as +14 and +7 points of green printer lights) thereby committing to its visual style early, rather than relying on digital grading during post-production. The soft lighting was achieved by "diffusing the fill sources enough to match [the natural lighting]" through the use of up to three layers of shades, HMIs and CTB, (Note: "C.T.B. stands for Color Temperature Blue. This is an abbreviation for the color correction gels used in lighting to convert the color temperature from tungsten to daylight. They come in gradients: Quarter Blue, Half Blue, Full Blue.") and set up to create as little shadow as possible to "subconsciously alter the viewer's sense of perception and add a heightened sense of ambiguity." Colourist Dale E. Grahn served as the color timer on the film, working in a traditional photochemical colour timing process rather than a modern digital intermediate workflow.

=== Title ===
As with the original Japanese film Ring, the title of The Ring can be interpreted as referring to the telephone call which warns those who watched the cursed tape that they will die in seven days, as well as to the view of the ring of light seen from the bottom of the well where Samara was left to die.

== Score ==
The Ring / The Ring Two (Original Motion Picture Soundtrack)

Film score by Hans Zimmer, Henning Lohner and Martin Tillman
- Released: March 15, 2005
- Recorded: 2002‒2005
- Length: 63:50
- Label: Decca

The Ring features an original score composed and arranged by Hans Zimmer (who later collaborated on Verbinski's other works). The soundtrack release did not coincide with the original 2002 theatrical run. It was released in 2005, accompanying The Ring's 2005 sequel in an album that combined music from both the first and second film. The soundtrack contains a few themes associated with the characters, moods and locations, including multiple uses of the Dies irae theme. The score makes use of string instruments, pianos and synthesizers.

== Release and reception ==
=== Marketing ===
To advertise The Ring, many promotional websites were formed featuring characters and places in the film. The video from the cursed videotape was played in late-night programming over the summer of 2002 without any reference to the film. Physical VHS copies were also randomly distributed outside of movie theaters by placing the tapes on the windshields of people's cars.

=== Box office ===
The Ring opened theatrically on October 18, 2002, in the United States, on 1,981 screens, and grossed $15 million during its opening weekend. It went on to become a sleeper hit, leading DreamWorks to expand its release to 700 additional theaters. It ultimately grossed $129.1 million in the United States. In Japan, it earned $8.3 million in the first two weeks of its release. Worldwide, The Ring grossed a total of $249.3 million.

=== Critical response ===
On the review aggregator website Rotten Tomatoes, The Ring has an approval rating of 72% based on 214 reviews and an average rating of 6.6/10. The site's critics consensus reads: "With little gore and a lot of creepy visuals, The Ring gets under your skin, thanks to director Gore Verbinski's haunting sense of atmosphere and an impassioned performance from Naomi Watts". Metacritic assigned the film a weighted average score of 57 out of 100 based on 36 critics, indicating "mixed or average reviews". Audiences polled by CinemaScore gave The Ring an average grade of "B−" on an A+ to F scale.

On Ebert & Roeper, Richard Roeper gave it a "Thumbs Up" and said it was very gripping and scary despite some minor unanswered questions. Roger Ebert gave the film "Thumbs Down" and felt it was boring and "borderline ridiculous"; he also disliked the extended, detailed ending. Jeremy Conrad from IGN praised The Ring for its atmospheric set up and cinematography, and said that "there are disturbing images ... but the film doesn't really rely on gore to deliver the scares". Film Threat's Jim Agnew called it dark, disturbing and original.

Despite the praise given to the direction, some criticized the lack of character development. Jonathan Rosenbaum from the Chicago Reader said that The Ring was "an utter waste of Watts ... perhaps because the script didn't bother to give her a character", whereas William Arnold from the Seattle Post-Intelligencer disagreed, saying that she projects intelligence, determination and resourcefulness. Several critics, like Miami Herald's Rene Rodriguez and USA Today's Claudia Puig, thought The Ring did not make sense despite its explanations.

=== Accolades ===
Year	Award	Category	Nomination(s)	Results
2002	Saturn Awards	Best Movie – Horror		Won
2002	Saturn Awards	Best Actress	Naomi Watts	Won
2003	MTV Movie Awards	Best Movie		Nominated
2003	MTV Movie Awards	Best Villain	Daveigh Chase	Won
2003	Teen Choice Awards	Best Movie – Horror		Won

== Legacy ==
The success of The Ring paved the way for American remakes of several other Asian and Japanese horror films, including The Grudge (2004), Dark Water (2005), Pulse (2006), One Missed Call, Shutter, The Eye, Mirrors, The Echo (all in 2008), The Uninvited and Don't Look Up (both 2009), Apartment 1303 3D (2012), and 13 Sins (2014).

The Ring ranked number 20 on the cable channel Bravo's list of The 100 Scariest Movie Moments. Bloody Disgusting ranked it sixth in their list of the "Top 20 Horror Films of the Decade", with the article saying that "The Ring was not only the first American 'J-horror' remake out of the gate; it also still stands as the best".

== Sequels ==
A sequel, titled The Ring Two, was released on March 18, 2005. A short film, titled Rings, was also released in 2005, and is set between The Ring and The Ring Two. A third installment, also titled Rings, was released on February 3, 2017. This film served as a direct sequel to the 2002 film, which ignores the events of both the short film and The Ring Two.

== See also ==
- Chain letter
- List of ghost films
- List of Ring characters
