= A Scene at the Sea =

1991 Japanese film by Takeshi Kitano

- Film poster

Japanese name
- Kanji: あの夏、いちばん静かな海。
Transcriptions
- Revised Hepburn: Ano natsu, ichiban shizukana umi
- Directed by: Takeshi Kitano
- Written by: Takeshi Kitano
- Produced by: Masayuki Mori
- Starring: Claude Maki; Hiroko Oshima; Sabu Kawahara; Susumu Terajima; Katsuya Koiso; Tetsu Watanabe
- Cinematography: Katsumi Yanagishima
- Edited by: Takeshi Kitano
- Music by: Joe Hisaishi
- Production companies: Office Kitano; Totsu; EnterOne
- Distributed by: Toho
- Release date: 19 October 1991 (Japan)
- Running time: 101 minutes
- Country: Japan
- Languages: Japanese; Japanese Sign Language

A Scene at the Sea (Japanese: あの夏、いちばん静かな海。, Hepburn: Ano natsu, ichiban shizukana umi; lit. That summer, the calmest sea) is a 1991 Japanese drama film written, edited and directed by Takeshi Kitano starring Claude Maki and Hiroko Oshima.

In the film, a deaf garbage collector happens upon a broken and discarded surfboard. The discovery plants in him dreams of becoming a surf champion. Encouraged by his also deaf girlfriend, he persists against all odds.

== Plot ==
Shigeru is a young deaf garbage collector living in a coastal town in Japan. One day during his route, he discovers a broken surfboard discarded in the trash. Though he has no experience with the sport, the board captures his imagination and he takes it home. With minimal resources and no guidance, he repairs the board himself and begins attempting to surf.

Shigeru's girlfriend, Takako – who is also deaf – watches silently but supportively as he dedicates himself to learning. They communicate through gestures and expressions, rarely speaking even in sign language. Takako accompanies Shigeru to the beach daily, sitting patiently on the sand as he learns to surf.

The couple is initially mocked by local surfers, who see Shigeru as an outsider and a novice. Nevertheless, his quiet determination earns their respect over time. He eventually buys a proper surfboard and improves enough to enter a local surfing competition. At the competition, none of the other surfers tell Shigeru that his name is called and he misses the contest.

Shigeru becomes increasingly consumed by surfing and he begins to miss work, preferring instead to surf. He, Takako and some of the other local surfers take a ferry to a local amateur surfing contest, where he wins a participation prize. The group pose for pictures on the beach.

The day after the surfing competition, Shigeru ventures out to sea alone and never returns, with his disappearance implying that he has drowned. His surfboard washes up on the shore. In the aftermath, a solitary Takako returns to the beach where they spent much of their time together. In an act of farewell, she attaches a photo of the two of them to his surfboard and gently pushes it out into the water.

A closing montage follows, depicting moments from their earlier days—scenes of them playing on the beach, surfing, and sharing time with other locals. The film's final image shows Shigeru and Takako standing side by side, gazing silently at the ocean.

== Production ==
This movie was a break from previous Kitano fare in that it features no gangsters or police. However, Kitano did return to darker themes in his next film, Sonatine, as well as many later works. In the film, Kitano develops his more delicate, romantic side along with his trademark deadpan approach. In 2002, the Japanese filmmaker directed a similar movie, Dolls, a romantic tale about three pairs of lovers.

This film marks the first collaboration between Kitano and composer Joe Hisaishi, who had previously created the acclaimed soundtracks of many of Hayao Miyazaki's anime films, including Nausicaä of the Valley of the Wind. Hisaishi would go on to compose the soundtracks for all of Kitano's films until Dolls, after which their collaboration ended.

Occasional Office Kitano actor, Claude Maki, who plays the mute main character, went on to appear in Kitano's film Brother as Ken, a Japanese-American punk set to become leader of a yakuza clan. In Brother, Claude speaks mostly in American-English with some occasional Japanese.

== Soundtrack ==
A Scene at the Sea

Soundtrack album by Joe Hisaishi
- Released: 25 November 1992
- Labels: Toshiba EMI, Milan Records (2001); Wonderland Records (2001)

The soundtrack CD was originally released on November 25, 1992, by Toshiba EMI; then, re-released many times by Milan Records and Wonderland Records.

1. "Silent Love (Main Theme)" − 6:52
2. "Cliffside Waltz I" − 3:58
3. "Island Song" − 3:39
4. "Silent Love (In Search of Something)" − 1:10
5. "Bus Stop" − 5:11
6. "While at Work" − 1:22
7. "Cliffside Waltz II" − 3:44
8. "Solitude" − 1:12
9. "Melody of Love" − 1:41
10. "Silent Love (Forever)" − 3:30
11. "Alone" − 1:04
12. "Next Is My Turn" − 0:45
13. "Wave Cruising" − 4:02
14. "Cliffside Waltz III" − 3:40
