= Glory to the Filmmaker! =

- Theatrical release poster
- Directed by: Takeshi Kitano
- Written by: Takeshi Kitano
- Produced by: Masayuki Mori
- Starring: Beat Takeshi; Tōru Emori; Susumu Terajima; Yuki Uchida; Anne Suzuki; Ren Osugi
- Cinematography: Katsumi Yanagishima
- Edited by: Takeshi Kitano; Yoshinori Ota
- Music by: Shinichirô Ikebe
- Production companies: Bandai Visual; Tokyo FM; Dentsu; TV Asahi
- Distributed by: Tokyo Theatres; Office Kitano
- Release date: June 2, 2007
- Country: Japan
- Language: Japanese

Glory to the Filmmaker! (監督·ばんざい!, Kantoku · Banzai!) is a 2007 Japanese film written, directed, edited by the film's lead star Takeshi Kitano. It is the second film in Kitano's surrealist autobiographical trilogy, following Takeshis', and concluding with Achilles and the Tortoise.

== Style ==
The comedy crosses a broad range of genres common to Japanese film in a fashion similar to Getting Any?, Kitano's 1995 parody. Kitano described the film as "a cinematic extension of his manzai comedy routines that continues in much the same vein as his last feature, the similarly eclectic Takeshis'."

== Plot ==
Kitano plays a hapless film director in search of a commercial hit, while suffering failure after failure as he tries out different genres.

== Cast ==
- Takeshi Kitano
- Tōru Emori
- Kayoko Kishimoto
- Anne Suzuki
- Keiko Matsuzaka
- Yoshino Kimura
- Kazuko Yoshiyuki
- Yuki Uchida
- Akira Takarada
- Yumiko Fujita
- Ren Osugi
- Susumu Terajima
- Naomasa Musaka

== Reception ==
In 2007, the Venice Film Festival introduced a new award named after the film; Kitano was the first recipient of this Glory to the Filmmaker Award.
