= Sonatine (1993 film) =

1993 Japanese yakuza film by Takeshi Kitano

- Theatrical poster
- Directed by: Takeshi Kitano
- Written by: Takeshi Kitano
- Produced by: Masayuki Mori; Hisao Nabeshima; Ritta Saito
- Starring: Takeshi Kitano
- Cinematography: Katsumi Yanagishima
- Edited by: Takeshi Kitano
- Music by: Joe Hisaishi
- Production companies: Bandai Visual; Shochiku Daichii Kougyo
- Distributed by: Shochiku
- Release date: 10 September 1993
- Running time: 94 minutes
- Country: Japan
- Language: Japanese
- Box office: $58,834

Sonatine (Japanese: ソナチネ, Hepburn: Sonachine) is a 1993 Japanese yakuza film directed, written and edited by Takeshi Kitano, who also stars in the film. It won numerous awards and became one of Kitano's most successful and praised films, garnering him a sizable international fan base.

== Plot ==
Murakawa, a Tokyo-based yakuza enforcer, has grown tired of gangster life. He is sent by his boss to Okinawa, supposedly to mediate a dispute between their allies, the Nakamatsu and Anan clans. Murakawa openly suspects the assignment is an attempt to have him removed and even beats up one of his colleagues, Takahashi, but ends up going with his men. He finds that the dispute is insignificant; the group's temporary headquarters is bombed and his men are ambushed in a bar, leaving several of them dead.

Fleeing to the seaside, the survivors take refuge in a remote beach house belonging to the brother of one of the Nakamatsu members and decide to wait for the trouble to blow over. Whilst spending time at the beach, the group engages in childish games and pranks and begins to enjoy themselves. However, the games frequently have a violent undertone. When two of his men alternate shooting at a beer can on each other's head, Murakawa turns it into a game of Russian roulette. Putting the gun to his head, he pulls the trigger on the last chamber, which is only then revealed to be empty.

Murakawa later dreams of the Russian roulette game, although in his dream, the revolver is loaded and he dies. When he wakes up, he walks down to the shore and witnesses a man attempting to rape a woman. Murakawa shoots the man, but to his companions he claims the woman shot him. She then joins Murakawa and the gang at the beach house and frequently visits, spending time with Murakawa. Later, an assassin, disguised as a fisherman, kills the boss of the Nakamatsu clan and one of Murakawa's men. Learning that Takahashi is arriving in Okinawa, Murakawa and two of his surviving men visit his hotel.

Unable to find him at first, they unexpectedly run into Takahashi and the assassin in the elevator, which results in a shootout, killing the assassin and Murakawa's men. Murakawa learns from interrogating Takahashi that their boss had intended all along to partner with the Anan clan and had sent Murakawa on a suicide mission to take over his turf. He also learns that the boss will be meeting with the Anan that night in another hotel. Takahashi is killed and Murakawa sets off with the only survivor of the group, a member of the Nakamatsu clan, who helps him by rigging the electricity in the hotel to go off at a certain time. Murakawa tells the woman that he might come back.

Later that night, Murakawa goes into the hotel and slaughters both clans with an assault rifle. The next morning, while the woman continues to wait for him, Murakawa is dropped off nearby. He gets into the woman's car alone and commits suicide by shooting himself in the head.

A post-credits scene takes place one year later, briefly showing the now abandoned seaside where Murakawa and the group had sheltered.

== Cast ==
- Takeshi Kitano as Murakawa, an aging mid-level yakuza.
- Aya Kokumai as Miyuki, an Okinawa rape victim.
- Tetsu Watanabe as Uechi, the head of the Nakamatsu gang who drives the group's bus.
- Masanobu Katsumura as Ryōji, a young coworker of Uechi who befriends Ken.
- Susumu Terajima as Ken, the gangly long-time lieutenant of Murakawa.
- Ren Osugi as Katagiri, a businessman under Murakawa.
- Tonbo Zushi as Kitajima, Murakawa's boss.
- Kenichi Yajima as Takahashi, the lieutenant of Kitajima.
- Eiji Minakata as The hit man, working for Takahashi and Kitajima.

== Production ==
The film was conceived with four basic scenes; yakuza having to go to Okinawa, yakuza arriving in Okinawa, the machine-gun shootout, and the main character shooting himself in the head. Kitano said his shooting technique is spontaneous in that he allowed the film to fill in the space between these four scenes itself.

The title Sonatine comes from the musical term sonatina. Kitano said that when learning the piano, when the learner gets to sonatinas they have to decide where they want to go, whether it is to classical, jazz or popular music; marking the point of crucial decision making. This refers to the character Murakawa in the film. The film's original title, "Okinawa Pierrot", was a possible reference to Jean-Luc Godard's Pierrot le fou.

The film's poster is of a Napoleon fish being pierced with a spear. Kitano said this type of fish used to be very common in the oceans south of Japan, but has been decreasing. He used the image simply because the contrast of the "beautifully shaped" fish being speared seemed striking to him.

== Soundtrack ==
Sonatine

Soundtrack album by Joe Hisaishi
- Released: 9 June 1993
- Length: 51:11
- Label: Toshiba EMI

The soundtrack to Sonatine was composed by Joe Hisaishi. It won the Japan Academy Film Prize for Outstanding Achievement in Music in 1994. The CD soundtrack was released in 1993 by Toshiba EMI, and later in France by Milan Records.

1. "Sonatine I (Act of Violence)"
2. "Light and Darkness"
3. "Play on the Sands"
4. "Rain After That"
5. "On the Fullmoon of Mystery"
6. "Into a Trance"
7. "Sonatine II (In the Beginning)"
8. "Magic Mushroom"
9. "Eye Witness"
10. "Runaway Trip"
11. "Moebius Band"
12. "Die Out of Memories"
13. "See You..."
14. "Sonatine III (Be Over)"

== Reception ==
Review aggregator Rotten Tomatoes reports that 93% of 27 professional critics have given the film a positive review, with a rating average of 7.7 out of 10. Metacritic assigned the film a weighted average score of 73 out of 100, based on 22 critics, indicating "generally favorable reviews".

Roger Ebert, who gave the film three and a half out of four stars, said it shows that gangster films do not need to have "stupid dialogue, nonstop action and gratuitous gore" and that it reminded him of Le Samouraï. The Guardian's Rob Mackie called it "a largely peaceful, contemplative work, punctuated by moments of extreme violence" and gave it four out of five stars. Scott Tobias of The A.V. Club summed the movie up as "a fresh take on the age-old yakuza genre that's infused by odd flourishes of style and playfulness, and jarring outbursts of humor and violence." Complex named Sonatine second on their list of The 25 Best Yakuza Movies, behind only Battles Without Honor and Humanity. Jasper Sharp, writing for the British Film Institute, listed it as one of the ten great Japanese gangster movies.

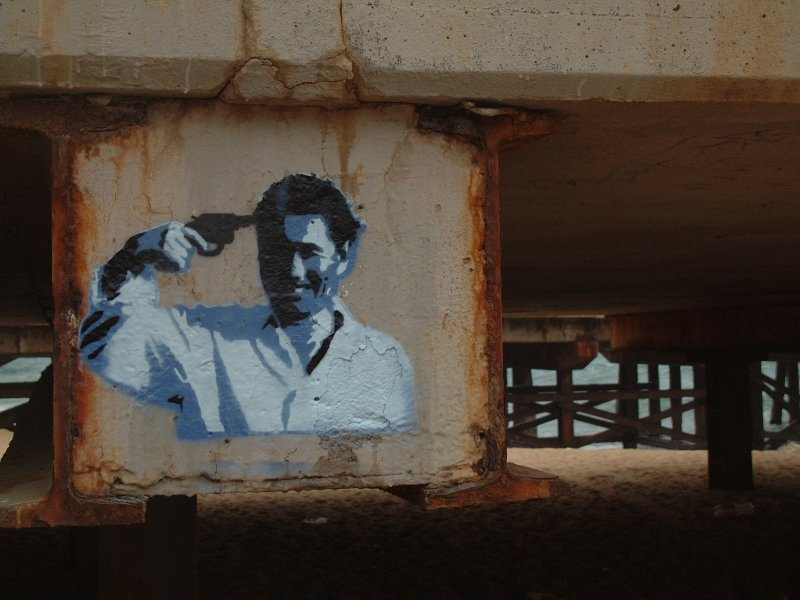
Graffiti in Sant Adrià de Besòs depicting a scene from Sonatine.

Sonatine was screened in the Un Certain Regard section at the 1993 Cannes Film Festival. French publisher and notorious movie-goer, Jean-Pierre Dionnet (Canal +/Studio Canal), reported in an interview, that someone convinced Alain Delon to watch Sonatine arguing that Kitano was a fan of Le Samouraï. Delon was taken aback, and talking about Kitano's acting, said: "What's THAT? [...], this is not an actor [...], he only has three facial expressions and he almost doesn't talk on top of this." Most professionals around Dionnet had the same reaction, but the French publisher was both struck and puzzled by this new genre. He contacted the Japanese distributor in order to buy the license for Sonatine, but his request was rejected. Dionnet had to insist for several months to finally discover that Shochiku didn't want to release Sonatine abroad, claiming the film was "too Japanese" and would not be accepted, nor understood, by western audiences. Eventually Dionnet learned that the distributor didn't want to release the license because of its commercial failure in Japan. Dionnet had an agreement with Shochiku arguing that French audiences did not know Kitano's career and would accept his violent character more easily. He bought Sonatine and three additional Kitano films, Violent Cop, Boiling Point and the latest, Kids Return. With the exception of Kids Return, all had performed poorly in Japan. In 1995, Sonatine entered the 13th Festival du Film Policier de Cognac in France, where it was critically acclaimed. Sonatine, followed by the three other films were broadcast on the French channel Canal+ a few months later. They were shown again a couple of years later on the Franco-German public channel Arte. A video release followed, including a DVD edition available in Dionnet's collection "Asian Classics".

As soon as 1995, Takeshi Kitano played the role of a yakuza in American director Robert Longo's cyberpunk thriller, Johnny Mnemonic. In North America, Sonatine was released in theaters in April 1998 and Quentin Tarantino released a subtitled video edition in 2000 as part of his Rolling Thunder Pictures collection. The same year, Kitano was convinced by his producer to go to the United States, where he filmed his first (and last) film outside Japan. Brother was shot in Los Angeles with an American crew and local actors, including Omar Epps. In an interview, Kitano admitted he was not fully satisfied with the final result of Brother and that he regretted his "Hollywood" adventure which was supposed to bring him a broader audience with a higher exposure. Kitano confessed he had no intention of shooting outside Japan any more.

== Awards ==
Sonatine won the Cariddi D'oro award for Best Film at the 1993 Taormina Film Fest. Aya Kokumai received the Best New Encouragement award at the 3rd Japan Film Professional Awards for her performance. The film's soundtrack won the Japanese Academy Award for Music in 1994. In 1995, it was awarded Critic's Choice at the Festival du Film Policier de Cognac.

== See also ==
- List of cult films
