= Ren Osugi =

Japanese actor (1951–2018)

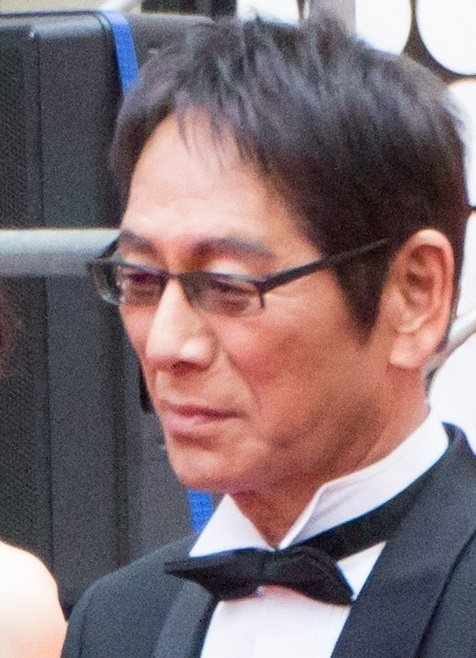
- Born: 大杉 孝 (Ōsugi Takashi); September 27, 1951; Komatsushima, Tokushima, Japan
- Died: February 21, 2018 (aged 66); Chiba, Japan
- Occupation: Actor
- Years active: 1973–2018

Ren Osugi (大杉 漣, Ōsugi Ren), born Takashi Osugi (大杉 孝, Ōsugi Takashi; September 27, 1951 in Komatsushima, Tokushima, Japan – February 21, 2018) was a Japanese actor. For his work in Cure, Hana-bi and other films, Osugi was given the Best Supporting Actor award at the 1999 Yokohama Film Festival. He often worked alongside Takeshi Kitano and Susumu Terajima. In the DVD commentary to the MPD Psycho television series, director Takashi Miike said that he admired Osugi's experience to shift quickly from comic and imbecilic to authoritative and earnest. He died of heart failure at the age of 66 on February 21, 2018.

== Filmography ==
=== Films ===
==== 1980s ====
- Kinbaku ikenie (緊縛いけにえ) (1980)
- Empire of Kids (ガキ帝国; Gaki teikoku) (1981)
- Beautiful Mystery (巨根伝説 美しき謎; Kyokon densetsu: utsukushii nazo) (1983)
- Abnormal Family: Older Brother's Bride a.k.a. Spring Bride (変態家族兄貴の嫁さん; Hentai kazoku: Aniki no yomesan) (1984)
- Momoiro shintai kensa (桃色身体検査) (1985)

==== 1990 ====
- Love of Sawako (さわこの恋 上手な嘘の恋愛講座)

==== 1991 ====
- Door II: Tokyo Diary
- Nowhere Man (無能の人; Muno no hito)
- Hello Harinezumi (ハロー張りネズミ; Haro harinezumi)

==== 1992 ====
- The River with No Bridge (橋のない川; Hashi no nai kawa)
- The Guard from Underground

==== 1993 ====
- Sonatine (ソナチネ)
- Bodyguard Kiba (ボディガード牙; Bodigaado Kiba)
- The Wicked Reporter (極道記者; Gokudou kisha)
- We're No Angels (俺達は天使じゃない; Oretachi wa tenshi ja nai) as Love Cult Church priest

==== 1994 ====
- Ninja Sentai Kakuranger (忍者戦隊カクレンジャー) - Sarugami

==== 1995 ====
- Black Money (ブラックマネー; Burakkmanei)
- Getting Any? (みんな～やってるか！; Minna-yatteruka!)
- ルビー The Target
- Marks (マークスの山; Maakusu no yama)
- A Weather Girl (お天気お姉さん; Otenki Oneesan)
- Voyeurs, Inc. (のぞき屋; Nozokiya)
- Shinjuku Triad Society (新宿黒社会 チャイナ マフィア戦争)
- Maborosi (幻の光)

==== 1996 ====
- XX: Beautiful Prey (XX 美しき獲物; XX: utsukushiki emono
- Shall We Dance? (Shall We ダンス？)
- Ghost Actress (女優霊; Joyuu rei) a.k.a. Don't Look Up
- Boys Are Ambitious (岸和田少年愚連隊)
- Door III
- Scandal (スキャンドール)
- Kids Return
- A Weatherwoman お天気お姉さん
- Non-Stop (弾丸ランナー; Dangan ran'naa)

==== 1997 ====
- The Revenge: A Scar That Never Disappears (復讐 THE REVENGE 消えない傷痕; Fukushu the Revenge Kienai Shokon)
- Postman Blues (ポストマン・ブルース) as Joe
- GANSTER II: 東京魔悲夜 外伝
- D#1
- Full Metal Yakuza (極道; Full Metal Gokudou)
- Cure (キュア)

==== 1998 ====
- Hana-bi
- Dolphin Through
- Love Letter (ラブ・レター )
- The Black Angel (黒の天使; Kuro no tenshi Vol. 1)
- The Goofball (愚か者 傷だらけの天使; Orokamono: Kizu darake no Tenshi)
- Unlucky Monkey (アンラッキー・モンキー; Anrakkii Monkii)
- Heavenz
- Dog Race (犬、走る; Inu Hashiru)
- Give It All (がんばっていきまっしょい; Ganbatte Ikimasshoi)
- Tokyo Eyes
- Fishes in August (水の中の八月; Mizu no Naka no Hachigatsu)
- License to Live (ニンゲン合格) (Ningen Gokaku)

==== 1999 ====
- Falling Into the Evening (落下する夕方) (Rakka suru yugata)
- Shikoku (死国; lit. "Death Country")
- Avec mon mari (アベックモンマリ)
- Ley Lines (日本黒社会; Nihon kuroshakai)
- The Exam (お受験; O-juken)
- 新極道伝説 三匹の竜
- Secret (秘密; Himitsu)
- Charisma (カリスマ)
- Dead or Alive (DOA Dead or Alive 犯罪者)
- Audition (オーディション)

==== 2000 ====
- Uzumaki/Spiral a.k.a. Vortex (うずまき)
- Crazy Lips (発狂する唇)
- Space Travelers (スペーストラベラーズ)
- Monday
- Persona (仮面学園; Kamen gakuen)
- I Am an S+M Writer (不貞の季節; Futei no kisetsu
- Sweet Sweet Ghost (スイート・スイート・ゴースト)
- The City of Lost Souls (漂流街 The Hazard City)
- By Player (三文役者)
- Dead or Alive 2: Birds (Dead or Alive 2: 逃亡者)
- PARTY7
- 鞠智城物語 防人たちの唄
- Brother

==== 2001 ====
- 降霊 (Gourei)
- Stereo Future
- Rush! (2001)
- Go
- Rain of Light (光の雨)
- 化粧師 (Kewaishi)

==== 2002 ====
- Long Love Letter: Hyouryu kyoushitsu
- Kikuchijou monogatari - sakimori-tachi no uta
- Sabu さぶ
- 旅の途中でFARDA
- Drive
- MPD Psycho
- Utsutsu (うつつ)
- Dolls
- The Twilight Samurai (たそがれ清兵衛)
- Last Scene
- Doing Time (刑務所の中)

==== 2003 ====
- Thirteen Steps (13階段)
- Getting Off the Boat at Her Island (船を降りたら彼女の島)
- Collage of Our Life
- Revolver - Green Spring (リボルバー －青い春－)
- Rockers
- Director Infection: "Kenenn" (監督感染 KENENN
- Iden&Tity (アイデン&ティティ)

==== 2004 ====
- Red Moon (赤い月)
- Legendary Crocodile, Jake and His Fellows (伝説のワニ ジェイク)
- Zebraman (ゼブラーマン)
- eiko (エイコ)
- Village Photobook (村の写真集; mura no shashinshuu)
- Lady Joker (レディ・ジョーカー)
- Out of This World (この世の外へ クラブ進駐軍)

==== 2005 ====
- Dead run (疾走; shisso)
- Takeshis'
- Life on the Longboard

==== 2006 ====
- Origin: Spirits of the Past .... Agashi (voice)

==== 2007 ====
- Nightmare Detective (悪夢探偵)
- Dear Friends (ディアフレンズ)
- Exte (エクステ)
- Glory to the Filmmaker! (監督·ばんざい!)

==== 2008 ====
- Achilles and the Tortoise (アキレスと亀)
- Nekonade

==== 2009 ====
- Baton

==== 2010s ====
- Postcard (2010) (Kichigoro)
- Yuriko, Dasvidaniya (2011) (百合子、ダスヴィダーニヤ)
- Crying 100 Times: Every Raindrop Falls (2013)
- Garo: Makai no Hana (2014) (四道、Shidō)
- Chasuke's Journey (2015)
- Bitter Honey (Mitsu no Aware) (2016)
- Shin Godzilla (2016)
- Outrage Coda (2017) (アウトレイジ 最終章)
- The Chaplain (2018)
- Back Street Girls: Gokudols (2019)

=== Television ===
- Katte ni shiyagare! Eiyû-keikaku (1996) a.k.a. Suit Yourself or Shoot Yourself: The Hero (International: English title) as Suzuki
- Shinsengumi Keppūroku (1998) as Susumu Yamazaki
- Manatsu no Merry Christmas (2000) as Akira Ohashi
- Kôrei (2000) a.k.a. Seance (International: English title) a.k.a. Seance (Ko-Rei) (Canada: English title) as Restaurant customer
- Furenzu (2000) a.k.a. Friends (Japan: English title) as Kobayashi
- Tajuu jinkaku tantei saiko - Amamiya Kazuhiko no kikan (2000, mini series) a.k.a. MPD Psycho a.k.a. Multiple Personality Detective Psycho - Kazuhiko Amamiya Returns (Japan: English title) as Tooru Sasayama
- Sayonara ozu sensei (2001)
- Part-Time Detective (2002) as Kazuo Yamada
- Sabu (2002) as Heizo
- Part-Time Detective 2 (2004) as Kazuo Yamada
- Boku to kanojo to kanojo no ikiru michi (2004, mini series) as Yoshirou Koyanagi
- Proof of the Man (2004)
- Seibu Keisatsu Special (2004)
- Samurai Rebellion (2013)
- The Supporting Actors (2017) as himself
- Uso no Sensou (2017) as Mamoru Sanpei
- Final Fantasy XIV: Dad of Light (2017) as Hirotaro Inaba
- Kinkyu Torishirabeshitsu Season 1 (2014), Season 2 (2017) as Nakata Zenjiro
- The Supporting Actors 2 (2018) as himself

=== Video games ===
- Black Panther 2: Like a Dragon Asura Chapter (2012) .... Tadashi Tsurumi
