= Hakuryu (actor) =

South Korean actor, voice actor and musician (born 1952)

- 白竜
- Born: Jun Jung-il; 3 October 1952 (age 73); Imari, Saga, Japan
- Status: Married
- Other name: Teiichi Takayama (高山 貞一)
- Citizenship: South Korea
- Education: Saga Prefectural Arita Technical High School
- Occupations: Actor; voice actor; musician
- Years active: 1984–present
- Website: hakuryu.com

Teiichi Takayama (高山 貞一, Takayama Teiichi; born 3 October 1952), known by his Korean name Jun Jung-il (Korean: 전정일) or his stage name Hakuryu (白竜, 白龍, Hakuryū) is a South Korean actor, voice actor, and musician from Saga Prefecture, Japan. He has appeared in more than 100 film and television productions since 1984, and is best known internationally for his collaborations with actor-director Takeshi Kitano. He formerly belonged to the entertainment company Cream International.

== Career ==
Hakuryu is a second-generation Korean resident of Japan (zainichi), whose real name is Jun Jung-il (Korean: 전정일; Hanja: 田貞一). He formed and played in an amateur band in high school and later started the Hakuryu band in 1978 with the aim of becoming a professional musician, making his debut with the single EP "Ariran no Uta / Shinparamu" (アリランの唄 / シンパラム) released in 1979. With a harshness and solemnity that most young people don't possess, and an outlaw-like quality that coexists inside and out, he began his career in 1984 with Yoichi Sai's theatrical film Someone Will Be Killed, and although his main focus has been on yakuza films and V-Cinema, he has appeared in such films as Takeshi Kitano's Violent Cop.

Currently, he has many roles in yakuza films as the number two of an organization, such as a young leading subordinate, with the characters being ruthless, cold-hearted schemers. His first anime voice acting performance was in Kaiji: Ultimate Survivor, where he played the role of Yukio Tonegawa. He also wrote, composed and performed the ending theme for the series, "Requiem for the Underdogs" (負け犬達のレクイエム, Makeinu-tachi no Rekuiemu).

He often wears sunglasses in the media and also designs sunglasses for the "Hakuryu" brand. He appeared on 13 July 2014 episode of "ARIYOSHI'S Meeting for Reviewing" (Nippon TV) and reflected on the fact that he likes sunglasses too much. His house was also shown to the public, where his extreme love for sunglasses was shown on-air.

== Selected filmography ==
Year	Title	Role	Notes/Ref.
1984	Someone Will Be Killed	Zhao Lie Hao	
1989	Violent Cop	Hitman Kiyohiro	
1992	Kantsubaki	Morihiro Tada	
1994	Shinjuku Outlaw		
1994	Like a Rolling Stone		
1995	Getting Any?	Audition judge	
1995	XX: Beautiful Beast	Ho	
1997	Hana-bi	Masatsugu Tōjō	
2001	Agitator		
2001	Hōjō Tokimune	Hōjō Tokiaki	TV series
2003	Rockers	Hakata Paradise Yamaji	
2004	Heat	Ishikura	
2007	Kaiji: Ultimate Survivor	Yukio Tonegawa	TV anime
2007	Black Belt	Kiichi Tanihara	
2008	The Good, the Bad, the Weird	Colonel Ishihara	
2009	Iris	Takashi Yamamoto	TV series
2011	AIBOU: Tokyo Detective Duo	Kuniyasu Mitazono	TV series
2011	Hard Romantic-er	Yakuza lieutenant	
2012	Beyond Outrage	Lee	
2013	Midsummer's Equation	Hidetoshi Senba	
2016	High & Low: The Movie	Chang	
2017	Outrage Coda	Lee	
2017	Yakuza Kiwami 2	Ryō Takashima	Video game
2018	Mr. Sunshine	Head of Black Dragon Society	TV series
2020	Food Luck		
2021	Under the Open Sky		
2021	Zombie Land Saga Revenge	White Ryu	TV anime
2024	Broken Rage		
