= Zomahoun Idossou Rufin =

Beninese ambassador

Zomahoun Idossou Rufin ゾマホン・イドゥス・ルフィン

Former ambassador of the Republic of Benin to Japan
- In office August 2, 2012 – Incumbent

Personal details
- Born: June 15, 1964 (age 62) Dassa-Zoumé, Dahomey
- Education: National University of Benin; Beijing Language and Culture University; Sophia University

Zomahoun Idossou Rufin (born June 15, 1964), popularly known as Zomahon (ゾマホン), is a Beninese foreign personality (gaijin tarento and diplomat) in Japan. He is currently the Ambassador of the Republic of Benin to Japan and the former Special Advisor of the President of the Republic of Benin Thomas Boni Yayi.

== Early life ==
Zomahoun was born in Dassa-Zoumé, Dahomey (the old name of Benin until 1975). He attended National University of Benin and Beijing Language and Culture University in Beijing, China. Until 2006, he was a student at Sophia University in Tokyo, where his coursework completed without a degree of Ph.D. in sociology. He can speak Yoruba, Fon, English, French, Mandarin and Japanese.

== Television career ==
In 1998, Zomahoun was "discovered" by a TBS executive and became a cast member on the TV show Koko ga Hen da yo Nihonjin. In a pool of 100 foreigners voicing their displeasure about certain aspects of Japanese society, he was usually picked due to his hyperactive Japanese speech, causing him to trip over his words and prompting the celebrity panel to yell at him to speak more slowly. He was one of the show's leading stars until its end in 2002. With the help of host Takeshi Kitano, Zomahoun built four schools in Benin, two of which are named after Kitano (Takeshi Elementary School and Takeshi Japanese School). Additionally, he won a People's Honor Award in Benin in 2002.

In 2008, he participated in a few episodes (403-406) of Ainori reality show, when the traveling group arrived in Benin.

== Diplomatic career ==
In December 2011, the Cabinet of Benin accredited him as Ambassador to Japan.

== Awards ==
- The World Highest Young Men's Award (JCI) (2001)
- People's Honor Award (in Benin) (2002)
