= Ken Kaneko =

Zainichi Korean actor (born 1976)

- 金子 賢
- Born: Kim Ja-hyun (김자현); October 19, 1976 (age 49); Shinjuku, Tokyo, Japan
- Other name: DJ KEN KANEKO
- Education: Senior High School affiliated to Tokyo Metropolitan University
- Occupations: Actor, tarento, former martial artist, disc jockey
- Years active: 1993-present
- Agent: Platinum Production
- Known for: Gokusen, Kids Return
- Height: 183 cm (6 ft 0 in)
- Website: Official profile

Ken Kaneko (Japanese: 金子 賢, Kaneko Ken; born October 19, 1976 in Shinjuku) is a Japanese actor, TV personality and former mixed martial artist. He is currently employed by Platinum Production. His blood type is O.

Ken Kaneko is best known for his role in the Takeshi Kitano film Kids Return (1996), in which he and Masanobu Andō portrayed a couple of high school dropouts trying to find purpose and direction in life. He was also a mixed martial artist in the Welterweight division and fought Charles Bennet in Pride FC Shockwave 2005.

== Filmography ==
=== Films ===
- Kids Return (1996)
- Himitsu (1999)
- Gokusen: The Movie (2009)
- Strawberry Night (2013)

=== Television drama ===
- Kindaichi Case Files (1996)

=== Television animation ===
- Rescue Wings (2008)

== Awards ==
- 1997: Japanese Academy Award – Newcomer of the Year (Kids Return)
- 1999: Elan d'or Award for Newcomer of the Year

== Mixed martial arts record ==
Ken Kaneko
- Height: 6 ft 0 in (1.83 m)
- Weight: 161 lb (73 kg; 11.5 st)
- Division: Welterweight
- Style: Brazilian jiu-jitsu
- Fighting out of: Tokyo, Japan
- Years active: 2005–2006

Mixed martial arts record
- Total: 3
- Wins: 0
- Losses: 3
- By submission: 2
- By decision: 1

Professional record breakdown
3 matches	0 wins	3 losses
By submission	0	2
By decision	0	1

Res.	Record	Opponent	Method	Event	Date	Round	Time	Location	Notes
Loss	0–3	Andy Ologun	Decision (unanimous)	K-1 PREMIUM 2006 Dynamite!!	December 31, 2006	3	5:00	Osaka, Japan	
Loss	0–2	Hideo Tokoro	Submission (Armbar)	K-1 Hero's 7	October 9, 2006	1	1:50	Yokohama, Japan	
Loss	0–1	Charles Bennett	Submission (Armbar)	Pride FC Shockwave 2005	December 31, 2005	1	4:14	Saitama, Japan	
