= Claude Maki =

Japanese surfer, actor and hip hop singer (born 1972)

- Born: October 3, 1972 (age 54); Akasaka, Minato-ku, Tokyo, Japan
- Occupations: Actor, singer, martial arts teacher, painter
- Years active: 1987–present
- Mother: Bibari Maeda

Claude Maki (真木蔵人, Maki Kurōdo) (born October 3, 1972) is a Japanese surfing and flight champion, actor and hip hop singer, under the stage name A.K.T.I.O.N., from Akasaka, Tokyo. He is the eldest son of actor and singer Mike Maki. His mother is Bibari Maeda (前田 美波里, Maeda Bibari), a Japanese-American actress.

== Biography ==
His height is 172 cm and his hobby is surfing. He made his television acting debut in 1987, after much work in theatre, in NHK's year-long Japanese period drama series Takeda Shingen. Also that year, he made his motion picture debut in Soul Music Lovers Only. In 1989, he was named Best Newcomer at the Japanese Academy Awards for his role in the film Buddies. In 1991 he portrayed the deaf-mute surfer Shigeru in Takeshi Kitano's third film A Scene at the Sea. He starred in Junji Sakamoto's Falling Angels in 1997, followed by four films in 1998 including Golden Wolf, Resurrection, and Beat.

As a rapper he is on the same label as Zeebra, Solomon i&i Production.

== Filmography ==
=== Film ===
Year	Title	Role	Notes
1988	Soul Music Lovers Only		
1989	Buddies		
1991	A Scene at the Sea	Shigeru	
1997	Fallen Angels	Ishii Hihashi	
1998	Golden Wolf		
1998	Beat		
1998	Resurrection		
1998	Dolphin Through		
2000	Brother	Ken	
2003	3 on 3		
2003	Moon		
2006	Backdancers!	Teru	
2007	Like a Dragon	Akira Nishikiyama	
2018	Woman Who Eats	Jun	
2022	A Winter Rose	Yuji Yakamoto	
2023	Okiku and the World		

=== Television ===
Year	Title	Role	Notes	Ref.
1987	Takeda Shingen	young Shingen and Takeda Katsuyori	Taiga drama	
