= Dolls (2002 film) =

- Theatrical release poster
- Kanji: ドールズ
- Revised Hepburn: Dōruzu
- Directed by: Takeshi Kitano
- Written by: Takeshi Kitano
- Produced by: Masayuki Mori; Takio Yoshida
- Starring: Miho Kanno; Hidetoshi Nishijima; Tatsuya Mihashi; Chieko Matsubara; Kyoko Fukada; Tsutomu Takeshige
- Cinematography: Katsumi Yanagishima
- Edited by: Takeshi Kitano
- Music by: Joe Hisaishi
- Production company: Office Kitano
- Distributed by: Shochiku
- Release dates: September 5, 2002 (Venice); October 12, 2002 (Japan)
- Running time: 114 minutes
- Country: Japan
- Language: Japanese
- Box office: $5.4 million

Dolls (Japanese: ドールズ, Hepburn: Dōruzu) is a 2002 Japanese film written, edited and directed by Japanese director Takeshi Kitano. A highly stylized art film, Dolls is part of Kitano's non-crime film oeuvre, like 1991's A Scene at the Sea, and unlike most of his other films, he does not act in it. The film has been praised for its cinematography (Katsumi Yanagishima) and features costumes by Yohji Yamamoto.

== Plot ==
The film features three primary sets of characters, each within their own distinct story:

- A young man (Matsumoto, played by Hidetoshi Nishijima) who rejects his engagement to his fiancée (Sawako, played by Miho Kanno) to marry the daughter of his company's president. When his former fiancée attempts suicide and ends up in a semi-catatonic state, he takes her out of the hospital and they run away.
- Another young man (Nukui, played by Tsutomu Takeshige) is obsessed with the pop-star Haruna (played by Kyoko Fukada); he blinds himself when she is involved in a disfiguring car accident.
- An aged yakuza (Hiro, played by Tatsuya Mihashi), who tries to meet a girlfriend from his youth (played by Chieko Matsubara).

These stories do have some incidental visual cross-over with each other in the film, but are mostly separate. The first story is the one on which the film centers. The film leads into it by opening with a performance of Bunraku theatre, and closes with a shot of dolls from the same. The performance is that of "The Courier for Hell" by Chikamatsu Monzaemon, and it alludes to themes that reappear later in the film. Because the rest of the film itself (as Kitano himself has said) can be treated as Bunraku in film form, the film is quite symbolic. In some cases, it is not clear whether a particular scene is meant to be taken literally. The film is also not in strict chronological order, but there is a strong visual emphasis on the changing of the seasons and the bonds of love over the progression of time (Matsumoto and Sawako spend most of the film physically connected by a red rope).

== Cast ==
- Miho Kanno as Sawako
- Hidetoshi Nishijima as Matsumoto
- Tatsuya Mihashi as Hiro, the boss
  - Kanji Tsuda as young Hiro
- Chieko Matsubara as Ryoko, the woman in the park
  - Yūko Daike as young Ryoko
- Kyoko Fukada as Haruna Yamaguchi, the pop star
- Tsutomu Takeshige as Nukui, the fan
- Kayoko Kishimoto as Haruna's aunt
- Ren Osugi as Haruna's manager

== Themes ==
The film and each of its vignettes revolve closely around the theme of death. It was Kitano's intent to show death as neither good nor bad but a relative event. In an interview, Kitano stated, "The reason why modern Japanese and Westerners loathe the notion of death so much is beyond me. There really is no reason to loathe death," adding, "How you perceive this film can considerably differ depending on the position where you stand."

== Soundtrack ==
Dolls

Soundtrack album by Joe Hisaishi
- Released: 2 October 2002 (UPCH-1191)
- Labels: Universal Music Japan, Milan Records

All compositions by Joe Hisaishi.

1. "Sakura" − 4:40
2. "Pure White" − 2:48
3. "Mad" − 4:55
4. "Feel" − 4:58
5. "Dolls" − 4:09

== Reception ==
The film received generally positive reviews. Dolls has an approval rating of 73% on review aggregator website Rotten Tomatoes, based on 41 reviews, and an average rating of 6.6/10. The website's critical consensus states: "Dolls doesn't offer easy answers, but for audiences attuned to its beguiling wavelength, writer-director Takeshi Kitano's work offers rich, distinctive rewards". Metacritic assigned the film a weighted average score of 71 out of 100, based on 16 critics, indicating "generally favourable reviews".

== Adaptations ==
A stage adaptation of the film was directed by Carrie Cracknell in 2009 for Hush Productions and the National Theatre of Scotland.
