= MPD Psycho (miniseries) =

- DVD cover
- Also known as: Multiple Personality Detective Psycho – Kazuhiko Amamiya Returns
- Genre: Horror; Mystery; Science fiction
- Based on: Multiple Personality Detective Psycho by Eiji Ōtsuka
- Screenplay by: Eiji Ōtsuka; Gichi Ootsuka; Yumi Sirakura
- Directed by: Takashi Miike
- Starring: Naoki Hosaka; Tomoko Nakajima; Ren Osugi; Sadaharu Shioda; Yoshinari Anan
- Theme music composer: Tsugutoshi Gotō; Yumi Shirakura
- Country of origin: Japan
- Original language: Japanese
- No. of episodes: 6

Production
- Producers: Naoki Abe; Yoshihisa Nakagawa; Toshihiro Satō
- Cinematography: Naosuke Imaizumi
- Running time: 56 minutes
- Production companies: Excellent Film; Kadokawa Shoten Publishing Co. MPD Psycho Project; Pony Canyon; Toskadomain Co. Ltd; WoWow

Original release
- Network: WoWow
- Release: 2 May 2000 – 2000

MPD Psycho (full title Multiple Personality Detective Psycho – Kazuhiko Amamiya Returns) is a 2000 Japanese six-episode horror crime television series based on the manga of the same name and directed by Takashi Miike. It originally aired on 2 May 2000. It has a surrealist bent, and, according to Jim Harper, the author of Flowers from Hell, "bears little similarity to the average made-for-TV detective thriller".

The plot is similar to the beginning of the manga series but does not relate to the incidents of Lucy Monostone and the Gakuso Company. The story takes place in the final days of the Shōwa Era. Yosuke Kobayashi, a detective assigned to a homicide unit, saw his wife killed by a serial killer, Shinji Nishizono. From the shock of the incident, he has multiple personality disorder and becomes Kazuhiko Amamiya. Soon after, he manages to hunt down and kill his wife's murderer. Now a series of murders has started and the suspect is claiming to be Shinji Nishizono.

== Episodes ==
No.	Title
1	"Memories of Sin/Drifting Petals"
A sadistic criminal is turning his victims into human flower pots. Detective Amamiya Kazuhiko is called out of early retirement to work on the case, which is tied to horrific events in his past. His new wife goes missing and a mysterious cult with barcodes tattooed on their eyeballs surfaces to wreak havoc on the city.
2	"How to Create a World"
A brutal serial killer cuts babies from their mothers' womb in what appears to be a copycat crime from five years earlier. All of the women have barcodes tattooed on their eyeballs. The victims, under some sort of hypnosis, purchase the surgical quality knives used to kill them the day before their murders. As Detective Amamiya's wife wanders the city in a trance, he discovers someone from his past is involved in the crime wave.
3	"Life Is a Constant Double Helix"
Detective Amamiya and the police team are investigating the mass suicide of forty girls from a posh high school. Amamiya goes undercover as a high school teacher to find out why and learn more about a new generation of barcoders, many of whom are students at this militaristic high school. Chiaki Kuriyama guest stars.
4	"The Crushed Ant"
Perfectly severed body parts with numbers cut into them are discovered in a field. In a nearby arcade, two rival youth gangs battle each other and Amamiya's wife is taken prisoner by a gang leader. The Police Chief tries to put together more of Amamiya's hidden past with the assistance of a one-eyed snuff filmmaker.
5	"Coronation of the Cursed King"
Cult members spontaneously combust when the barcoder network is infected. The burn victims are taken to the local hospital where a lonely employee's cyber girlfriend tells him to kill people. Detective Amamiya and his team lock down the hospital, while strange things happen on the secret 13th floor.
6	"Soaring Souls and Human Bondage"
The Police Department denies that the barcode case ever existed in a massive cover-up attempt. Three remaining members of the investigation team decide to continue working on the case on their own. The Police Chief's entire family dies under mysterious circumstances. Amamiya tracks down the baby stealer to a remote cabin in a snowstorm for a final showdown to recover his own missing child.

== Background ==
The series contains several visual distortions which, mistaken by some to be censorship, are of non-explicit images and have been seen instead as a jab against Japanese censorship.

== Critical reception ==
DVD Talk called it a "difficult yet fascinating" series that "wraps you up in its nightmarish dreamscapes", writing, "its unending complications will put off many, but for fans of Miike's catalogue or other similarly intentionally dense, style-over-substance material, there's enough here to delight and horrify".

== Home video ==
The series was first released on DVD by Pony Canyon in Japan.

It was subsequently released on DVD in Australia in 2008 by Siren Visual Entertainment.
