= Susumu Terajima =

Japanese actor (born 1963)

- 寺島 進
- Born: 12 November 1963 (age 62); Fukagawa, Kōtō, Tokyo, Japan
- Occupation: Actor

Susumu Terajima (寺島 進, Terajima Susumu; born 12 November 1963) is a Japanese actor. Though he has played a wide range of characters, he is perhaps best known for his portrayal of yakuza figures, most notably in the films of Takeshi Kitano.

Terajima made his acting debut in 1986's A Homansu. He joined Japan Music Entertainment in December 2018.

== Early life ==
Terajima was born in Fukagawa, downtown of Tokyo. He is the second son of three and his father was a tatami craftsman. His childhood memory was when he and his mother walking to kindergarten together and his teacher called him "mu-chan" because of his cute face. Terajima's interest in acting began when he watched an action-comedy movie, Truck Yarou. He also loved to sing, impersonating members of the pop duo Pink Lady with his friends. After graduating from high school, to pursue his dream of becoming an actor, he enrolled at Mifune Art Academy to continue his education, although his parents did not agree with his decision as they wanted him to continue working in the family business. During those years, Terajima did many side jobs, including work as a stuntman, until he met Yusaku Matsuda, who directed A Homansu and gave Terajima a minor role in the movie.

== Career ==
Terajima played a supporting role in Violent Cop (1989), where he met his respectful mentor, Takeshi Kitano. His breakthrough as an actor was in Kitano's Sonatine. After the success of Sonatine, Terajima went on to enjoy a successful career playing various roles in television and film, usually in a supporting position, but occasionally as the lead character, such as in Hirokazu Kore-eda's After Life and Sabu's The Blessing Bell (2002).

== Selected filmography ==
=== Film ===
- A Homansu (1986)
- Itoshino Half Moon (1987)
- Violent Cop (1989)
- A Scene at the Sea (1992)
- Sonatine (1993)
- Elephant Song (1994)
- Getting Any? (1995)
- Okaeri (1995)
- Marks (1995)
- Suit Yourself or Shoot Yourself: The Hero (1996)
- Kids Return (1996)
- Postman Blues (1997)
- Hana-bi (1997)
- Unlucky Monkey (1998)
- After Life (1998)
- Shark Skin Man and Peach Hip Girl (1998)
- Eyes of the Spider (1998)
- Taboo (1999)
- Dead or Alive (1999)
- Brother (2000)
- Hole in the Sky (2001)
- Distance (2001)
- Ichi the Killer (2001)
- The Blessing Bell (2002)
- Harmful Insect (2002)
- Moon Child (2003)
- Casshern (2004)
- The Taste of Tea (2004)
- Nobody Knows (2004)
- Custom Made 10.30 (2005)
- Takeshis' (2005)
- Funky Forest (2005)
- Negotiator (2005), Joichiro Kijima
- Hana (2006)
- Unfair (2006)
- The Uchoten Hotel (2006)
- Hula Girls (2006)
- Unfair SP (2006)
- Green Mind, Metal Bats (2006)
- Unfair: The Movie (2007)
- Kantoku Banzai (2007)
- Still Walking (2008)
- All Around Us (2008)
- The Magic Hour (2008)
- Achilles and the Tortoise (2008)
- Air Doll (2009)
- Goemon (2009)
- Zatoichi: The Last (2010)
- Bayside Shakedown 3 (2010), Joichiro Kijima
- Ninja Kids!!! (2011)
- Smuggler (2011)
- Unfair: The Answer SP (2011)
- Helter Skelter (2012)
- Bayside Shakedown: The Final (2012), Joichiro Kijima
- Human Trust (2013)
- The Kiyosu Conference (2013), Kuroda Kanbei
- When Marnie Was There (2014)
- Unsung Hero (2014)
- April Fools (2015)
- Chasuke's Journey (2015)
- Doubutsu Sentai Zyouohger (2016)
- Love's Twisting Path (2019)
- Hit me Anyone One More Time (2019)
- Last of the Wolves (2021), Yōji Kakutani
- Noise (2022)
- Yudo: The Way of the Bath (2023)
- Kubi (2023), Sahei
- The Quiet Yakuza Part 1 (2023), Takeshi Sakamoto
- The Quiet Yakuza Part 2 (2023), Takeshi Sakamoto
- Blazing Fists (2025), Takayuki Hino
- Tsuki no Inu (2026)
- The Invisibles (2026), Seiichi Kurata
- Bayside Shakedown: N.E.W (2026), Joichiro Kijima
- Kaiji 4 (2027), Kozo Nonomura

=== Television ===
- Fūrin Kazan (2007), Akabe Shimotsuke-no-kami
- Sanada Maru (2016), Ideura Masasuke
- What Will You Do, Ieyasu? (2023), Mizuno Nobumoto

=== Video games ===
- Yakuza 2 as Jiro Kawara (2006)
- Ryū ga Gotoku Kenzan! as Itō Ittōsai (2008)
- Yakuza Kiwami 2 as Jiro Kawara (2017)

== Books ==
- Terajima no aniki ni kike yo! Komatta toki wa itsudemo koi! (2007) ISBN 978-4-576-07018-6
- Teppen toru made (2020) ISBN 978-4-591-16586-7
