= Koko ga Hen da yo Nihonjin =

Japanese television series

Koko ga Hen da yo Nihonjin (ここがヘンだよ日本人, This doesn't make sense, Japanese people!) was a Japanese TV show that was broadcast weekly from 1998 to 2002 on TBS.

It consisted of two panels: One was a group of Japanese celebrities notably consisting of Takeshi Kitano, Konishiki, Ruy Ramos and Terry Ito. The other panel was a pool of 100 Japanese-speaking expatriates from around the world voicing, in Japanese, their grievances about their treatment in Japan. From this panel Zomahoun Idossou Rufin or "Number 68" as he was called on the show because of his designated panel number, became a popular foreign celebrity due to his anger on a number of subjects that caused him to talk much faster than native Japanese speakers. The show was unique as it was a departure from the way foreigners are traditionally used on Japanese television that instead of being glorified non-talking set pieces, they could converse and articulate in conjunction with Japanese tarento.

The show was also a jumpboard for several of the regular Japanese panelists; at least three of them later pursued successful careers as politicians:

- Mizuho Fukushima, Chairwoman of the Social Democratic Party and Minister of State for Consumer Affairs and Food Safety, Social Affairs and Gender Equality (2009-2010)
- Hideo Higashikokubaru, governor of Miyazaki Prefecture (2007-2011) and
- Yōichi Masuzoe, former Minister of Health, Labour and Welfare (from 2007 to 2009), and former Governor of Tokyo (2014-2016)
