= Broken Rage =

Japanese action comedy film

- Film poster
- Directed by: Takeshi Kitano
- Written by: Takeshi Kitano
- Produced by: Satoshi Fukushima
- Starring: Takeshi Kitano; Tadanobu Asano; Nao Omori; Hakuryu; Shidō Nakamura
- Cinematography: Takeshi Hamada
- Edited by: Takeshi Kitano; Yoshinori Ota
- Music by: Shinya Kiyozuka
- Production company: Kitano Agency
- Distributed by: Amazon MGM Studios
- Release dates: September 6, 2024 (Venice); February 14, 2025 (Prime Video)
- Running time: 66 minutes
- Country: Japan
- Language: Japanese

Broken Rage is a 2024 Japanese action comedy film, written and directed by Takeshi Kitano, who also leads the cast which features an ensemble cast including Tadanobu Asano, Nao Omori, Hakuryu, and Shidō Nakamura.

It premiered at the 81st Venice International Film Festival.

== Premise ==
An exercise in style, the film tells a story in two parts, and sees an aging hitman offered an ultimatum for his freedom. The first half is told in the style of a thriller. The second half is the same story told in the style of a heightened comedy.

== Cast ==
- Takeshi Kitano as Nezumi (Takahashi)
- Tadanobu Asano as Detective Inoue
- Nao Ōmori as Detective Fukuda
- Hakuryu as Tomita
- Nakamura Shidō II as Kaneshiro
- Takashi Nishina as Yoshida
- Shohei Uno as Tamura
- Shoken Kunimoto as Drug Dealer
- Masato Yano as Takaaki Oguro
- Shiro Maeda as Man in Bag / Police Captain
- Jun Akiyama as Undercover Investigator at the Bar
- Gekidan Hitori as Game Presenter
- Masanori Hasegawa as Yasuo Mogi
- Azusa Babazono as Bar Hostess
- Mogura Suzuki as Optometrist

== Production ==
It is written and directed by Takeshi Kitano who also leads the cast which features Tadanobu Asano, Nao Omori, Hakuryu, and Shidō Nakamura. It is scored by Shinya Kiyozuka. It was produced by Amazon MGM Studios.

== Release ==
It became the first Japanese streaming production selected for the Venice Film Festival out of competition section when it premiered at the 81st Venice International Film Festival in 2024. It was released globally on Amazon Prime Video on February 14, 2025.

== Reception ==
On the review aggregator website Rotten Tomatoes, 80% of 10 critics' reviews are positive, with an average rating of 6.8/10.
