= Kids Return =

1996 film by Takeshi Kitano

- Film poster
- Directed by: Takeshi Kitano
- Written by: Takeshi Kitano
- Produced by: Masayuki Mori; Yasushi Tsuge; Takio Yoshida
- Starring: Masanobu Andō; Ken Kaneko; Leo Morimoto; Hatsuo Yamatani; Michisuke Kashiwaya; Mitsuko Oka; Yuuko Daike; Ryo Ishibashi
- Cinematography: Katsumi Yanagishima
- Edited by: Takeshi Kitano
- Music by: Joe Hisaishi
- Distributed by: Office Kitano
- Release date: July 27, 1996 (Japan)
- Running time: 103 minutes
- Country: Japan
- Language: Japanese

Kids Return (Japanese: キッズ・リターン, Hepburn: Kizzu Ritān) is a 1996 Japanese film written, edited and directed by Takeshi Kitano. The film was made directly after Kitano recovered from a motorcycle wreck that left one side of his body paralyzed. After undergoing extensive surgery and physical therapy, he quickly went about making Kids Return amidst speculation that he might never be able to work again. The movie is about two high school dropouts, Masaru (Ken Kaneko) and Shinji (Masanobu Andō), who try to find a direction and meaning in their lives—one by becoming a yakuza lieutenant, the other by becoming a boxer.

The music was composed by Joe Hisaishi, and the cinematographer was Katsumi Yanagishima.

== Plot ==
Shinji and Masaru are high school delinquents, terrifying their classmates, stealing money, and even setting their teacher's car on fire. After some of their victims hire a boxer to beat up Masaru, he decides to get revenge, and takes his shy friend Shinji along with him to a boxing gym. To their trainers' surprise, Shinji is naturally-talented at boxing and easily defeats Masaru in a sparring session. Masaru encourages his friend to keep going at it, and quits boxing, opting instead to join the yakuza. As Shinji focuses on becoming a successful boxer, Masaru aims to become a gang leader, and their paths diverge.

While the two of them climb to the top in their respective areas, Shinji adopts an unhealthy lifestyle that results in the end of his boxing career. Likewise, Masaru's arrogance and disrespect for his boss gets him kicked out of the yakuza. In the end, they are both left with nothing, and meet again. As they ride their bike together in the schoolyard, Shinji wonders if this is the end of their lives, but Masaru assures him that "it's only the beginning".

== Cast and roles ==
- Ken Kaneko as Masaru
- Masanobu Andō as Shinji
- Leo Morimoto as Teacher
- Hatsuo Yamatani as boxing club manager (credited as Hatsuo Yamaya)
- Michisuke Kashiwaya as Hiroshi
- Mitsuko Oka as coffee-shop owner, Sachiko's mother
- Yūko Daike as Sachiko
- Ryo Ishibashi as local Yakuza chief
- Susumu Terajima as No. 2 in local gang
- Moro Morooka as Hayashi
- Peking Genji
- Atsuki Ueda as Reiko
- Kotaro Yoshida
- Koichi Shigehisa as Trainer
- Kyōsuke Yabe
- Yoshitaka Ōtsuka as delinquent
- Masami Shimojō as Yakuza godfather
- Kazuki Oh
- Shintarō Hasegawa
- Kanji Tsuda
- Yojin Hino as taxi office worker (credited as Yōjin Hino)
- Ren Osugi as taxi passenger
- Takashi Hagino

== Soundtrack ==
Kids Return

Soundtrack album by Joe Hisaishi
- Released: 26 June 1996
- Label: Polydor

All compositions by Joe Hisaishi.

1. "Meet Again" − 5:02
2. "Graduation" − 1:07
3. "Angel Doll" − 2:21
4. "Alone" − 1:15
5. "As a Rival" − 1:29
6. "Promise... for Us" − 5:08
7. "Next Round" − 1:28
8. "Destiny" − 3:31
9. "I Don't Care" − 2:18
10. "High Spirits" − 2:03
11. "Defeat" − 2:29
12. "Break Down" − 3:46
13. "No Way Out" − 2:51
14. "The Day After" − 0:44
15. "Kids Return" − 4:40

== Reception ==
=== Critical reception ===
At the time of its release, Kids Return was Takeshi Kitano's most successful film yet in his native Japan, which until then had been notedly less enthusiastic about his films than international viewers. Rotten Tomatoes gives this film a 100% approval rating based on reviews from five critics, with an average score of 7.8 out of 10. David Wood, writing for the BBC, described it as "a tender, funny and melancholy affair which will come as a delight to ardent admirers after the recent Kikujiro." He gave the film 4 out of 5 stars.

=== Accolades ===
At the 1997 Japanese Academy Awards, Kids Return was nominated for three awards and won two of them.

Awards
Award	Category	Recipient(s)	Outcome
Japanese Academy Awards
Japanese Academy Awards	Newcomer of the Year	Masanobu Andō	Won
Japanese Academy Awards	Newcomer of the Year	Ken Kaneko	Won
Japanese Academy Awards	Best Music Score	Joe Hisaishi	Nominated
Blue Ribbon Awards
Blue Ribbon Awards	Best New Actor	Masanobu Andō	Won
Yokohama Film Festival
Yokohama Film Festival	Best Film	Takeshi Kitano	Won
Yokohama Film Festival	Best New Talent	Masanobu Andō	Won
Yokohama Film Festival	Best Supporting Actor	Ryo Ishibashi	Won
Yokohama Film Festival	Best Cinematography	Katsumi Yanagishima	Won

== Sequel ==
In 2013 a sequel to the film titled Kids Return: The Reunion was released, directed by the assistant director of the original, Hiroshi Shimizu. It is set ten years after the original and follows an older Shinji (Yuta Hiraoka) and Masaru (Takahiro Miura). The two of them meet after their failures in boxing and crime, respectively, and they work together to improve their situation. The new film was created with minimal input from Kitano.
