= Getting Any? =

1994 film by Takeshi Kitano

- Directed by: Takeshi Kitano
- Written by: Takeshi Kitano
- Produced by: Masayuki Mori; Hisano Nabeshima; Taiko Yoshida
- Starring: Beat Takeshi; Dankan; Sonomanma Higashi; Tokie Hidari; Shouji Kobayashi
- Cinematography: Katsumi Yanagishima
- Edited by: Takeshi Kitano; Yoshinori Ota
- Music by: Senji Horiuchi; Hidehiko Koike
- Production companies: Office Kitano; Bandai Visual
- Distributed by: Nippon Herald Films
- Release dates: November 1994 (BFI London Film Festival); 2 February 1995 (Japan)
- Running time: 110 minutes
- Country: Japan
- Language: Japanese

Getting Any? (Japanese: みんな～やってるか！, Hepburn: Minnā yatteru ka!; lit. Is everyone doing it?) is a 1994 Japanese sex comedy film written, directed, edited, and starring Takeshi Kitano. Yatteru (やってる) is the colloquial form for yatteiru (やっている), yatteru coming from the Japanese verb yaru, which is an informal word meaning 'to do', and has become slang for sexual intercourse. It showed Beat Takeshi, originally a very popular manzai performer, returning to his comedic roots. The movie features an Airplane!-like assemblage of comedic scenes centering on a Walter Mitty-type character whose obsession is to have sex.

The film met with little acclaim in Japan where its release was barely noticed. Kitano said in 2003 (while in production for Zatoichi), that Getting Any? was one of his three favourite movies among the ten he had directed by that time. According to him, this work was the basis for many of the movies that followed, including the acclaimed Hana-bi, as it features all his recurrent themes plus its shares of violence and sorrow.

According to Kitano, his purpose in this movie was to laugh at his own gags, to make a mockery of them. He also wanted to laugh at the young Japanese men, those born after World War II, who were simple-minded and much too direct and simplistic when it came to talking with girls about having sex. Kitano denied satirizing Japanese society, and claimed that his aim in this movie was to make the audience laugh.

== Plot ==
Asao, a naive and goofy man, lives with his grandfather in Saitama Prefecture. Even though Asao is 35 years old, he is very inexperienced with girls, but he absolutely wants to have sex. One day as he watches an erotic TV film, he realizes that all he needs to get girls and sex is a fancy car, so he runs to the closest car dealer.

In the TV film, the male character had a Porsche 911 Cabriolet, so Asao aims for a luxury import car dealer. The car dealer asks what kind of car he is looking for, and Asao naively answers that he wants "a car for having sex". After trying a cabriolet, with the assistance of a very helpful and somewhat helpless hostess, Asao confesses he is short of money. All he can afford is a used domestic budget-car, so he is forced to buy a Honda Today, a modest kei car which is very cheap compared to the Mercedes-Benz, Rolls-Royce, Aston Martin and Ferrari cars displayed in the show room.

Then, he quickly restages the scene he has seen in the TV film, with the help of a female mannequin, before aiming for girls passing by on the street. Quickly, Asao realizes that male-female social relations are not as simple as in porn, and that real life girls are not as naive as in fictional works.

After several humiliating and unsuccessful tries, Asao comes to the conclusion that roadsters are more efficient. Such cars are expensive but Asao lacks money, so he asks his grandfather to help him. After selling his grandfather's liver and kidneys, he returns to the car dealer. The man convinces him to buy an Austin Healey Sprite MkI, a classic British roadster, but once he learns how much money Asao really has, he changes his mind and sells him a Eunos Roadster (a.k.a. Mazda Miata), a popular Japanese roadster, claiming it is the same car. When Asao protests, the dealer claims the '50s Austin-Healey was old-fashioned and the Eunos is a better model for cruising. The Eunos is driven a few meters and starts falling apart. Asao complains to the dealer, but the latter refuses to talk with him any more, so Asao picks up the fallen pieces and attaches them to the back of his car.

The young man tries his luck anyway with girls on the street, but does not succeed, so he finally sells his wrecked car to a local salvage company.

As he walks home, he finds an apparently abandoned, parked, Mazda RX-7 Turbo, and decides to steal it. Asao drives a few miles when he encounters a young woman walking along the road and decides to talk to her, as shown in the erotic film, but the sports car's brakes no longer work and he runs over the girl, and crashes the car into a billboard. He is lucky enough to not get hurt and ditches the coupé.

Asao imagines airline stewardesses offer naked "on-board sex service" to first class 747 customers, so he decides to travel by plane. Since he does not have any money, he will do an armed bank robbery, but first he needs a weapon, so he heads to Kawaguchi City (near Tokyo) where he will be able to make his own revolver in the local iron foundry.

Eventually, he has many adventures such as joining the yakuza, becoming Zatoichi, becoming invisible, and getting transformed into a giant fly-man similar to the film The Fly. Getting Any? ends with his capture after diving into a large reservoir of feces.

In a post-credits scene, Asao jumps around Tokyo as a grasshopper man before getting impaled on Tokyo Tower.

== Cast ==
- Dankan (Minoru Iizuka) - Asao
- Hideo Higashikokubaru - Yaku
- Takeshi Kitano - Scientist
- Akiji Kobayashi - Chief of Earth Defence Force
- Masumi Okada - Russian actor
- Susumu Terajima - Injured Yakuza
- Ren Osugi - Head Yakuza 3

== References and parodies ==
Much of the film appears to satirize popular Japanese culture from the 1950s up to the '80s, including cinema, TV series, anime, and pop music; although, Kitano himself denied it.

References to the gangster films of Joe Shishido abound, as well as to the videos of Michael Jackson. The inspiration for the fly-man and the toumei ningen (transparent man) may have been a 1957 horror movie directed by Mitsuo Murayama, called Transparent Man & Fly-Man (透明人間と蝿男). The manner in which the "fly man" is formed is directly taken from David Cronenberg's 1986 remake of The Fly, so the gag is also at least partially based on the Hollywood film. Hunting suits worn by the Doctor and his assistant are a reference to Ivan Reitman's 1984 SF-comedy Ghostbusters. The alternative ending, which comes after the end credits, features the familiar reference to Steven Spielberg E.T., the character flying by the moon.

Getting Any? also features some guest stars including Masumi Okada (playing Joseph Stalin) and Akiji Kobayashi (as leader of the Terrestrian Forces from Ultraman).

=== Cinema ===
- Lone Wolf and Cub series (子連れ狼, Kozure Ōkami aka Sword of Vengeance)
- Zatoichi series (座頭市, Zatōichi)
- Branded to Kill (殺しの烙印, Koroshi No Rakuin)
- Secret of the Telegian (電送人間, Densō Ningen)
- Tōmei ningen to hae-otoko (透明人間と蝿男, lit. Invisible Man & Fly-Man)
- Godzilla vs. Mothra (ゴジラVSモスラ)
- Ghostbusters
- The Fly (1986 film)

=== TV series ===
- Ultraman series (ウルトラマン)

=== Anime ===
- Ge ge ge no Kitaro series (ゲゲゲの鬼太郎)

=== Music ===
- Enka style
- J-pop style
- Minyo style

== Scatological humour ==
Questioned about the scatological gags used in his movie, Takeshi Kitano answered that excrements and manure were a common source of humor in Japan, since the country was traditionally an agricultural workers' land.

A French interviewer even asked the film maker if the giant turd, seen near the end of the movie, was a metaphor for the decadence of the Japanese society, but Kitano laughed and answered that it was not and only meant as a "local color" joke.

== Bibliography ==
- Takeshi Kitano video interview featured in the Getting Any? DVD published by Cheyenne Films (EDV 1040), France (2003).
