= 3rd Japan Film Professional Awards =

Japanese film awards in 1994

- Date: March 10, 1994
- Site: Cinema Argo Shinjuku, Tokyo, Japan

The 3rd Japan Film Professional Awards (第3回日本映画プロフェッショナル大賞) is the 3rd edition of the Japan Film Professional Awards. It was awarded the best of 1993 in film. The ceremony took place on March 10, 1994, at Cinema Argo Shinjuku in Tokyo.

== Awards ==
- Best New Encouragement: Aya Kokumai (Sonatine, Kyōso Tanjō)
- Best Actor: Ryo Ishibashi (All Under the Moon)
- Best Actress: Hikari Ishida (Haruka, Nosutarujī)
- Best Director: Toshihiro Tenma (Kyōso Tanjō)
- Best Film: All Under the Moon (WOWOW Special Drama J Movie Wars Edition)
- Best New Director: Shinobu Yaguchi (Hadashi no Picnic)
- Best New Director: Tetsuo Shinohara (Kusa no Ue no Shigoto)
- Best New Encouragement: Hikari Ōta (Kusa no Ue no Shigoto)

== 10 Best films ==
1. All Under the Moon (Yoichi Sai)
2. Tsuge Yoshiharu World: Gensenkan Shujin (Teruo Ishii)
3. Kusa no Ue no Shigoto (Tetsuo Shinohara)
4. Hadashi no Picnic (Shinobu Yaguchi)
5. Kyōso Tanjō (Toshihiro Tenma)
6. Graduation Journey: I Came from Japan (Shusuke Kaneko)
7. Human Scramble: Furyō (Banmei Takahashi)
8. Patlabor 2: The Movie (Mamoru Oshii)
9. Gokudō Kisha (Rokurō Mochizuki)
10. Sora ga Konnani Aoi Wake ga Nai (Akira Emoto)
