= Terry Ito =

- テリー 伊藤
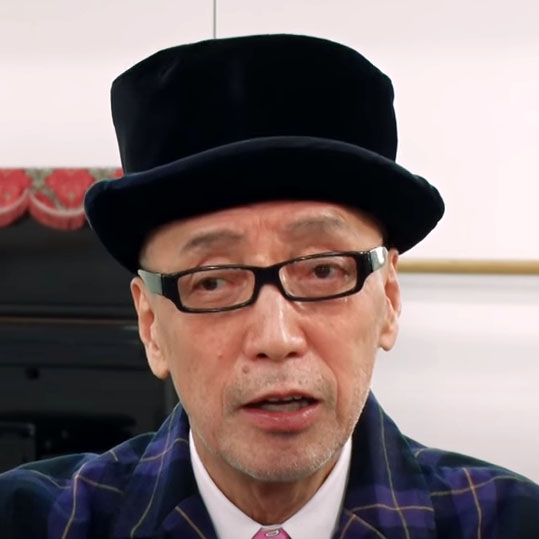
- Born: Teruo Ito; December 27, 1949 (age 76); Tsukiji, Chūō, Tokyo, Japan
- Occupations: Director, producer, critic, writer
- Height: 1.74 m (5 ft 9 in)

Teruo Ito (伊藤 輝夫, Itō Teruo; born December 27, 1949, in Tsukiji, Chūō, Tokyo, Japan), better known as Terry Ito (テリー 伊藤, Terī Itō), is a Japanese director, television producer, critic, and writer. His name "Terry" comes from his first name, "Teruo". His ancestral home is in Yokoshibahikari, Sanbu District, Chiba Prefecture.

Ito served as the president of the television program production company, Locomotion.

Ito, in conjunction with Toyota, helped design a limited edition pink S210 Toyota Crown called Toyota Reborn Pink Crown Athlete. The Crown featured a bright pink exterior and pink trim pieces in the interior. Toyota sold 650 units of the limited vehicle.

== Filmography ==
=== TV series ===
Year	Title	Network	Notes
2012	Idol Sennyū Sōsa	Mondo TV	
2012	Time is Life: Tokimeki no Toki	BS-TBS	
2013	Terry Ito no Tokyo Sennyū Sōsa	Mondo TV	
2015	Tadashi Kakihana no Anata to Happy!	NBS	Monday
	Terry Ito no Trouble Hunter	Tokyo MX	Tuesday
	Sunday Japon	TBS	Regular commentator
	Bakuhō! the Friday	TBS	
2015	Hakunetsu Live Vivid	TBS	Tuesday and Wednesday
2015	Charge 730!	TV Tokyo	Thursday

==== Past ====
Year	Title	Network	Notes
1995	Cannibalism - The Issei Sagawa Story	Private	
1999	Tokyo Boy	Tokyo MX	
	Koko ga Hen da yo Nihonjin	TBS	
	Tensai Terry no Geinō Damascus	NBS	
	Notte ke Terry! Nagisa no Seishun Hanafubuki	NBS	
	Terry Ito Notte ke Radio	NBS	
	Terry Ito Sunday Notte ke Radio	NBS	
	Yamitsuki	CTV	
	TV Cruise Tonari no Papaya	Fuji TV	
	News Station	TV Asahi	
	Gahaha King Bakushō-ō Kettei-sen	TV Asahi	
	Fukuyama Endjiniyaringu	KTV	
	Doyō Ichiban! Hanayashiki	Fuji TV	
	Yajiuma Plus	TV Asahi	
	Saturday Live What's!? Nippon	Fuji TV	
	Jikadanpan! Sekininsha Detekoi!	TV Tokyo	
	Utatte Saikō!	TV Tokyo	
2008	Kima wa Break	TBS	
2008	TV Asobi Perfor	NHK G	
	Shin Kankaku Game Cuesta	NHK G	Thursday; Occasional guest appearances
	Sunday! Scramble	TV Asahi	Regular commentator
2010	Megami no Kiseki	TV Tokyo	
2011	H.I.S. Presents Terry Ito no Sekai no Tabisetsu	Tokyo MX	
2011	Bakushō Dai Nihon Akan Keisatsu	Fuji TV	Guest judge
2011	62nd NHK Kōhaku Uta Gassen	NHK	Television secondary audio MC
	Terry Ito no Nehorihahori	TV Tokyo	
	Hoko × Tate	Fuji TV	Quasi-regular
2012	Terry Ito no Friday Scoop Soko Made iu ka!	NBS	
2012	AKB-ko Usagi Dōjō	TV Tokyo	
	Generation Tengoku	Fuji TV	Occasional appearances
2013	Masuda Auto Salon	BS Fuji	

=== Drama ===
Year	Title	Role	Network	Notes
2000	Fukaku Kakure: Hakkenden 2001	Ichi Oda, Takashi Kimura, Kiichi Nagumo	NHK	
2004	Hatachi: 1983-nen ni Umarete		Fuji TV	Special appearance
2005	Trick	Terry Itau	TV Asahi	
2007	Fūrin Kazan	Fukushima Echizen Nokami	NHK	Episodes 2 to 6
2008	Sei Chikyū-ron	Chairman (Voice)	WOWOW	
2010	Ryōmaden	Ueno Hikoma	NHK	
2011	Onegai Kanaete Versailles		MBS, TVK	Episode 5; Special Guest
2013	Shōgeki Gouraigan!!	Makai-ō	TV Tokyo	

=== Films ===
Year	Title	Role	Notes
2000	Zawazawa Shimokitazawa		
2004	Oh! My Zombie Mermaid		
2004	Hana and Alice		
2006	Aogeba Tōtoshi		
2009	Chōhatsu Dai Kaijū Gehara	Alien	
2010	Masayuki Kuaraba		
2010	10 Oku-en Kasegu		Directed; Lead role
2015	Gonin Saga	Ryusei Shikine	

=== Advertisements ===
Year	Title	Notes
	Sapporo Brewery "Nama Shibori"	
	NTT DoCoMo "Manner Kōkoku"	
	GyaO	
2002	Keirin	
2006	Intelligence	
	Onix Wan'nappu System	
	Greeeen Ā, Domo. Hajimemashite	
2009	Jupiter Telecommunications "Motto TV o"	
	Tokyo Gas "Ene Farm"	
	Ministry of Agriculture, Forestry and Fisheries (Food Action Nippon) "Beifun Club"	
2010	Suntory "Sesamin E Plus"	
2010	Bike O	
2011	Fujifilm "Oshōgatsu o Utsusou"	
2011	Suntory "Boss Zeitaku Bitō"	
2014	Toshimaen "Teriyaki"	

=== Mobile websites ===
Title	Notes
Geinō! Ura Channel	

=== Video games ===
Year	Title	Role	Notes
2011	Yakuza: Dead Souls	Zombie	
