= Brother (2000 film) =

2000 film directed by Takeshi Kitano

- Japanese theatrical release poster
- Directed by: Takeshi Kitano
- Written by: Takeshi Kitano
- Produced by: Masayuki Mori; Jeremy Thomas
- Starring: Takeshi Kitano; Omar Epps; Claude Maki; Tetsuya Watari
- Cinematography: Katsumi Yanagishima
- Edited by: Takeshi Kitano
- Music by: Joe Hisaishi
- Production companies: Recorded Picture Company; Office Kitano
- Distributed by: Shochiku Co., Ltd. (Japan); BAC Films (France); Sony Pictures Classics (United States); FilmFour Distributors (United Kingdom)
- Release dates: September 7, 2000 (Venice Film Festival); July 20, 2001 (Japan)
- Running time: 114 minutes
- Countries: Japan; France; United States; United Kingdom
- Languages: Japanese; English
- Box office: $15.3 million

Brother (Japanese: ブラザー, Hepburn: Burazā) is a 2000 crime film starring, written, directed, and edited by Takeshi Kitano. The film premiered on September 7, 2000 at the Venice Film Festival. The plot centers on a mature yakuza gangster who has to flee to America, where he unites forces with his little brother and his brother’s gang in Los Angeles.

It is the only American production directed by Kitano and also the only such film in which he starred.

== Plot ==
Yamamoto (Takeshi Kitano) is a brutal and experienced yakuza enforcer whose boss was killed and whose clan was defeated in a criminal war with a rival family. Surviving clan members have few options: either to join the winners, reconciling with shame and distrust, or to die by committing seppuku. Yamamoto, however, decides to escape to Los Angeles along with his associate Kato (Susumu Terajima). There he finds his estranged half-brother Ken (Claude Maki), who runs a small-time drug business together with his local African-American friends. At the first meeting, Yamamoto badly hurts one of them, Denny (Omar Epps), for an attempt to scam him. Later, after Ken invites Yamamoto into his home, the two are left alone and play a game in which Yamamoto secretly cheats by puncturing the cup, winning against Denny, who does not initially realize he is the same man who attacked him earlier. Despite this, Denny later becomes one of Yamamoto’s closest friends and associates.

Used to living in a clan and according to its laws, Yamamoto creates a hapless gang out of Ken's buddies. The new gang quickly and brutally attacks Mexican drug bosses and takes control of their territory in LA. They also form an alliance with Shirase (Masaya Kato), a criminal leader of Little Tokyo district, making their group even stronger. As time passes, Yamamoto and his new gang emerge as a formidable force, gradually expanding their turf to such an extent that they confront the powerful Italian Mafia. Now everybody respectfully addresses Yamamoto as Aniki (兄貴, elder brother). But soon Aniki suddenly loses any interest in their now successful but dangerous business, spending his time with a girlfriend or just sitting silently thinking about something. However, the Mafia ruthlessly strikes back, and soon Yamamoto and his gang are driven into a disastrous situation of no return as they are hunted down one by one. Yamamoto eventually dies, and Denny starts driving off. Denny starts having an outburst, complaining about the dirty, foul-smelling bag while also fearing he might be the next to die. When he checks the bag inside, he discovers it contains the compensation money Yamamoto had given him after cheating him in their earlier game. Denny breaks down, shouting in anger and grief before tearfully declaring, “I love you, Aniki, wherever you at, man!”

== Cast ==
- Takeshi Kitano as Yamamoto, also referred to as Aniki (meaning elder brother)
- Omar Epps as Denny
- Tetsuya Watari as Jinseikai Boss
- Claude Maki as Ken
- Masaya Kato as Shirase, the "boss of Little Tokyo"
- Susumu Terajima as Kato, Yamamoto's lieutenant
- Royale Watkins as Jay
- Lombardo Boyar as Mo
- Ren Osugi as Harada
- Ryo Ishibashi as Ishihara
- James Shigeta as Sugimoto
- Tatyana Ali as Latifa
- Makoto Otake as Chief of Police
- Kouen Okumura as Hanaoka
- Naomasa Musaka as Hisamatsu
- Rino Katase as Night Club Madame
- Joy Nakagawa as Marina, Yamamoto's Girlfriend
- Amaury Nolasco as Victor
- Tuesday Knight as Prostitute
- Tony Colitti as Roberto
- Antwon Tanner as Colin

== Soundtrack ==
Brother

Soundtrack album by Joe Hisaishi
- Released: 27 January 2001
- Genres: Stage & screen
- Length: 49:39
- Labels: PolyGram, Silva America, Milan Records
- Producer: Joe Hisaishi

Professional ratings
Review scores
Source	Rating
Allmusic	3/5 stars

=== Track listing ===
No.	Title	Writer(s)	Length
1.	"Drifter... in LAX"	Joe Hisaishi	4:22
2.	"Solitude"	Duke Ellington, Joe Hisaishi	3:34
3.	"Tattoo"	Joe Hisaishi	0:56
4.	"Death Spiral"	Joe Hisaishi	1:04
5.	"Party – One Year Later"	Joe Hisaishi	4:26
6.	"On the Shore"	Joe Hisaishi	1:21
7.	"Blood Brother"	Joe Hisaishi	3:37
8.	"Raging Men"	Joe Hisaishi	1:19
9.	"Beyond the Control"	Joe Hisaishi	1:25
10.	"Wipe Out"	Joe Hisaishi	5:26
11.	"Liberation from the Death"	Joe Hisaishi	3:52
12.	"I Love You... Aniki"	Joe Hisaishi	4:37
13.	"Ballade"	Coleman Hawkins, Joe Hisaishi, Charlie Parker	1:53
14.	"BROTHER"	Dean Dinning, Randy Guss, Joe Hisaishi, Todd Nichols, Glen Phillips	4:32
15.	"BROTHER – Remix Version"	Dean Dinning, Randy Guss, Joe Hisaishi, Todd Nichols, Glen Phillips	4:15
Total length:			49:39

== Production ==
Impressed with Europeans' interest in yakuza, Kitano wrote what he described as an old-fashioned yakuza film. To greater contrast the character against more familiar elements, he set it in a foreign country, choosing Los Angeles as a place-holder. When producer Jeremy Thomas asked Kitano if he was interested in foreign productions, Kitano told him about the script. Thomas promised him complete creative control, which Kitano said he got. Commenting on the differing styles of filmmaking, Kitano said that American productions are more focused on the business side and are less sentimental. Kitano cited their strong pride in their professionalism as a positive aspect.

== Release ==
Several scenes were censored for the U.S. release.

== Reception ==
At the time of its release, Brother was hyped as Kitano's vehicle for breaking into the United States film market. The film has a 47% rating on Rotten Tomatoes based on 74 reviews, and an average rating of 5.2/10. The website's critical consensus states: "There is too much hollow bloodshed in Brother, and the characters are stereotypically flat". Metacritic assigned the film a weighted average score of 47 out of 100, based on 23 critics, indicating "mixed or average" reviews.

Roger Ebert, who has praised all of Kitano's films he has seen, complimented Kitano in his review but ultimately rated the film two out of four stars, writing that "Brother is a typical Kitano film in many ways, but not one of his best ones." Marc Savlov of the Austin Chronicle gave the film two and half stars out of five, stating: "Kitano's beat is an altogether grimmer affair, laden with dark irony and unexpurgated scenes of violence. It's rougher stuff than most would expect, though not unrewarding in its own horrific way." A reviewer of Time Out commented: "A film of almost diagrammatic clarity, in which questions of loyalty, honour and, yes, brotherhood are mere pieces on the chessboard."

In his review for Variety, David Rooney wrote: "Kitano frequently tips his hat to the American gangster movie in Coppola-styled scenes of confrontation and carnage. But while many of the action set pieces are enlivened by the director’s customary verve and humor, the plot advances clumsily with the narrative engine continually sputtering and stopping. Characters are so unsatisfyingly developed that the film delivers only on a basic level as a tale of gangster rivalry, greed, elimination and expansion, with its larger themes struggling to register... Brother is full of elegant compositions and poised, deliberate camera movement but rarely matches the visual impact of earlier Kitano features."

Kitano stated in an interview that he was open to shooting another film in America again.
