= Yō Takeyama =

Japanese screenwriter (1946–2023)

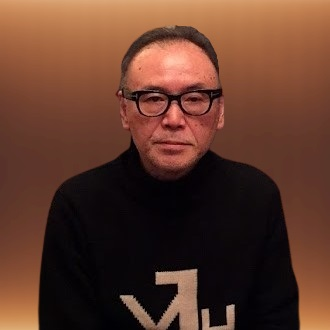
- Born: 武田 淳一
- Died: 12 April 2023
- Occupations: Screenwriter, writer

Hiroshi Takeyama (Yō Takeyama (竹山 洋, Takeyama Yō); July 28, 1946 – April 12, 2023) was a Japanese screenwriter. Besides his work for television, he is best known for his screenplays for Hotaru (2001) and Shijushichinin no shikaku, Kon Ichikawa's 1994 version of the Forty-seven rōnin story. Both of these were nominated but did not win the Award of the Japanese Academy for "Best Screenplay".

== Background ==
Takeyama was born in Saitama Prefecture, Japan on July 28, 1946. He graduated from the Literature program at Waseda University. He then became a dramatist working in television production, and credited with screenplays beginning in 1979. In the early 1980s, Takeyama worked in Nikkatsu's softcore Roman Porno films, writing three scripts for Shōgorō Nishimura, director of Apartment Wife: Affair In the Afternoon (1971), the first entry in this long-running series. For Nishimura, Takeyama penned Nurses' Journal: Nasty File (1980), Kōichirō Uno's Girl Dormitory (1980), and "My Girlfriend Wears a Uniform" (1981).

== Film ==
Takeyama co-wrote director Kon Ichikawa's 1994 film 47 Ronin, working on the screenplay with the director. Variety writes of the film's storyline that it, "reportedly sticks closer to the historical events than other versions have," and that it is, "clean and uninflected, with the action zipping back and forth between a series of indoor locations (denoted by captions)." The review points out that the amount of historical detail given in the film is likely to alienate audiences who are not familiar with the story of the Forty-seven Ronin.

With Ichikawa's wife, Natto Wada, Takeyama wrote the comedy-drama Kah-chan (2001). As Ichikawa's 75th film, Variety writes that the film is a "career milestone of nonetheless minor artistic significance". Reviewed under the English title Big Mama Variety judged, "[t]hough smoothly done, 'Big Mama' never provides any compelling reason why its formula serio-comedy occupies the big-screen rather than the small -- or better yet, a legit stage matinee."

Takeyama wrote the script for controversial director Takashi Miike's Sabu (2002), based on the novel of the same title by Shūgorō Yamamoto, the author upon whose work Kurosawa based his Sanjuro (1962) and Red Beard (1965). Originally a 90-minute TV film made to commemorate the 40th anniversary of the Nagoya Broadcasting Network, the film was given a 121-minute theatrical release. In many ways atypical of director Miike's work, Sabu is a coming-of-age period drama set in the Edo period involving a friendship between two boys.

== Television ==
Takeyama was in charge of the writing of the yearly NHK Taiga dramas Hideyoshi (1996) and Toshiie to Matsu (2002). Japan's Agency for Cultural Affairs gave Takeyama an award for his script for Sabu, and the Grand Prize for his work on Ten to sen (2008). His work for television is regularly included in the Writers Guild of Japan's annual anthology of the best writing for the medium. His teleplays were printed in the Guild's anthologies for 1983 (Shōnen H), 1987 (恋人たちのいた場所), 1994 (清左衛門残日録 第十回－夢), 2000 (Shōnen H), 2003 (Sabu), and 2008 (Ten to Sen).

== Death ==
Takeyama died from septic shock on April 12, 2023, at the age of 76.

== Filmography as writer ==
- 1980-06-21 "Never In the Morning!" (朝はダメよ！, Asa Wa Dameyo!) [Nikkatsu] dir: Kichitaro Negishi
- 1980-08-02 Nurses' Journal: Nasty File (看護婦日記 わいせつなカルテ, Kangofu Nikki: Waisetsu Na Karute) [Nikkatsu] dir: Shōgorō Nishimura
- 1981-01-09 Kōichirō Uno's Girl Dormitory (宇能鴻一郎の修道院付属女子寮, Uno Kōichirō no Shudōin Fuzoku Joshiryō) [Nikkatsu] dir: Shōgorō Nishimura
- 1981-08-27 Gynecology Ward: "Caress Me Tenderly" (婦人科病棟 やさしくもんで, Fujin-ka Byōto: Yasashiku Monde) [Nikkatsu] dir: Jun'ichi Suzuki
- 1981-11-13 "My Girlfriend Wears a Uniform" (情婦はセーラー服, Iro wa Sailor-Fuku) [Nikkatsu] dir: Shōgorō Nishimura
- 1984-03-02 Hakui Monogatari: Insu! (白衣物語 淫す！) [Nikkatsu] dir: Hidehiro Itō
- 1988-03-19 Ureshi Hazukashi Monogatari (うれしはずかし物語) [Nikkatsu] dir: Yōichi Higashi
- 1994-10-22 47 Ronin (四十七人の刺客, Shijushichinin no Shikaku) [Toho] dir: Kon Ichikawa
- 1997-02-15 Gimu to Engi (義務と演技) [Toei] dir: Haruo Ichikura
- 2001-05-27 The Firefly (ホタル, Hotaru) [Toei] dir: Yasuo Furuhata
- 2001 Koike Mariko no 'Kagi rôjin' (TV)
- 2001-11-10 Big Mama (かあちゃん, Kah-chan) [Nikkatsu] dir: Kon Ichikawa
- 2002-10-05 Sabu (さぶ) (TV) dir: Takashi Miike
- 2007 Ten to sen (点と線) (TV mini-series)
- 2007 Ri Kôran (2 episodes, TV)

== Awards and nominations ==
- 2002, nomination for 'Best Screenplay' for Hotaru, a.k.a. The Firefly, by Japan Academy Awards
- 2003, Agency for Cultural Affairs award for Sabu
- 2008, Agency for Cultural Affairs Grand Prize for Ten to Sen

== Sources ==
- 竹山 洋 (in Japanese). tvdrama-db.com.
- 日本有数 / 作者のことば: 竹山 洋 (in Japanese). docin.com]. September 2003.
- 竹山洋 (in Japanese). Japanese Movie Database.
- 竹山洋( 脚本 ) (in Japanese). Kinema Junpo.
