= Multiple Personality Detective Psycho =

Japanese manga and its adaptation(s)

- MPD Psycho
- Cover of the first volume of the MPD-Psycho manga

多重人格探偵サイコ (Tajū-Jinkaku Tantei Saiko)
- Manga
- Written by: Eiji Ōtsuka
- Illustrated by: Shōu Tajima
- Published by: Kadokawa Shoten
- English publisher: NA: Dark Horse Comics
- Magazine: Shōnen Ace (1997–2007); Comic Charge (2007–2009); Young Ace (2009–2016)
- Original run: 1997 – 2016
- Volumes: 24
- Television drama
- MPD Psycho (2000)
- icon

MPD Psycho, short for Multiple Personality Detective Psycho (Japanese: 多重人格探偵サイコ, Hepburn: Tajū-Jinkaku Tantei Saiko), is a Japanese manga series written by Eiji Ōtsuka and illustrated by Shōu Tajima. MPD Psycho sold more than four million copies in Japan as of 2007. It was originally published by Kadokawa Shoten from 1997 to 2016 and was licensed by Dark Horse Comics in 2007. The series follows a police detective suffering from multiple personality disorder.

MPD Psycho was adapted as a live action television miniseries in 2000, directed by Takashi Miike.

== Plot ==
Yôsuke Kobayashi is a detective and is on the case of a serial killer who dismembers his victims. The killer later sends Yôsuke's girlfriend dismembered but kept alive. Yôsuke hunts down the killer, but loses his sanity and develops dissociative identity disorder in the process, with the two main personalities being Kazuhiko Amamiya, a cool headed detective and Shinji Nishizono, a reckless psychopath. After being placed in prison for murdering the killer, Yôsuke Kobayashi is released and works for an independent detective agency ran by Machi Isono. Later serial killers are appearing with barcodes in their left eyes, which Yôsuke Kobayashi also has. Yôsuke Kobayashi investigations lead him to believe he is not who he thinks he is and that his Kazuhiko and Shinji personalities have existed since childhood.

During the case known as "Lucy Seven", Shinji gains control of Yôsuke Kobayashi and disappears.

Later, it is found out that the Gakuso organization is behind the barcodes. Machi investigates and learns that Kazuhiko Amamiya and Shinji Nishizono are programmed personalities, genetically created (apparently by Gakuso) so that they could merge into a joint personality that is expected to greatly resemble that of Lucy Monostone, a legendary serial killer with a counter-culture personality.

It is revealed that there are multiple Shinji Nishizono personalities and that one exists in Machi's sister, Miwa. Miwa meanwhile runs into Yôsuke Kobayashi on a plane and manages to absorb the Kazuhiko Amamiya personality. At the same time, another host of a Shinji Nishizono personality (a teenager named Tetora Nishizono, who can temporarily transfer his Shinji Nishijono personality template to others) escapes from the Gakuso organization and runs into Miwa. She later gives the Kazuhiko personality to Tetora, who needs to add that personality to his own in order to remain psychologically stable. In exchange, Miwa demands that Tetora promise to keep the Kazuhiko personality alive and safe inside him no matter what.

Meanwhile, evidence of internal conflict inside Gakuso and of political use of same by high Japanese authorities mounts, and the police officers investigating the murders find themselves dealing with conflict and suspicion from all sides.

A few years later, Tetora continues his run from the Gakuso organization. The plot takes turns, removing central characters while introducing new ones, leading to issue #11 which is in its entirety a flashback to events previous to the first issue of the series, bringing a new, more complete understanding of the whole situation. By #12 we resume the current day storyline and learn of new motivations for at least two characters. Gakuso's nature and goals are also fleshed out.

== Characters ==
=== Protagonists ===
Shinji Nishizono

Yosuke Kobayashi (小林 洋介, Kobayashi Yōsuke) appears to be a police detective working on a serial killing case. While tracking down a serial killer who mutilates his victims by severing their limbs, his girlfriend (Chizuko) is mutilated by the killer, who claims to recognise the detective as a fellow psychopath. After tracking down the killer, Shinji Nishizono (西園 伸二, Nishizono Shinji), an arrogant and callous psychopath, emerges and shoots the killer. This personality quickly disappears and is replaced by Kazuhiko Amamiya (雨宮一彦, Amamiya Kazuhiko), a cool-headed, serious criminologist. Amamiya is then arrested and imprisoned for the murder of the serial killer. Throughout the course of the story, Amamiya Kazuhiko and Nishizono Shinji's personality switch back and forth, with Shinji's personality usually emerging only after a traumatic incident (such as the burning of several bodies) or when the body is in danger. It is usually clear to the reader which personality is in control at any given time as Kazuhiko Amamiya is near-sighted and wears glasses, whereas Shinji Nishizono does not require glasses. It is later revealed that the original personality of the body belonged to Nishizono Shinji who had killed, along with Murata Kiyoshi, the original Kobayashi Yosuke, the original Amamiya Minako and the original Sakurai Kotone as well as severely burning the original Amamiya Kazuhiko. After seeing the decapitated bodies of two of the Lucy 7, Nishizono Shinji regains control over his body and reappears after a 6-month time-skip. Coincidentally, he sees Isono Miwa and decides to get on the same flight as her because he thought that "some interesting things would occur" and assists in the hijacking of the plane for his own purposes. While on the plane, Isono Miwa, after a brief struggle, successfully absorbs the personality of Amamiya Kazuhiko from him. He is shot and killed by a Gakuso Company member while facing off with Nishizono Tetora on the Gakuso experiment ship.

Machi Isono

Machi Isono (伊園 磨知, Isono Machi) is an intelligent criminologist who runs a private consultancy firm. She employs Kazuhiko Amamiya upon his release from prison and invites him to live in the large apartment which serves as home to herself and her sister as well as the headquarters of her business. Her real name is revealed in #13 to be Wakana Isono Monostone.

Miwa Isono

Miwa Isono (伊園 アリワン 美和, Isono Miwa) is the younger sister of Isono Machi. She is initially introduced as a schoolgirl with a forceful personality who occasionally helps Machi and Amamiya in their cases. As the series progresses, she becomes more important as revelations about her role in the conspiracy that runs through the book are revealed. She is later revealed as a new generation bar-coder who carries a crucial alternate personality for the formation of Lucy Monostone. Her last seemingly important role was to transfer the personality of Kazuhiko Amamiya to Nishizono Tetora. Miwa Isono appears episodes five and six of the television series as a comatose girl rescued from a burning hospital who later forms a relationship with Amamiya.

Tetora Nishizono

Tetora Nishizono (西園 弖虎, Nishizono Tetora) is a young teenaged version of Kazuhiko Amamiya, Tetora Nishizono also carries the psychopathic personality of Shinji Nishizono, although the personality of Shinji is far more dominant in Tetora. He receives Kazuhiko's personality from Isono Miwa. Tetora Nishizono does not appear in the TV mini-series.

=== Antagonists ===
Gakuso Company

Gakuso is a secret, influential, and ruthless company with advanced genetic technology. Some evidence exists that it suffers from serious internal conflict and has a branch called "Onihigata". Many antagonists are involved with Gakuso, though not always knowingly or willingly. One of Gakuso's main projects is recreating Lucy Monostone by mixing fragments of programmed personalities into a host body. Chapter 79 reveals that Gakuso does the barcode experiments not just to make a perfect killer, but a controllable one that will serve to further their company's aims. After hints in previous issues, Gakuso's larger political goals are fleshed out in #12.

Zenitsu

A pale-haired man who seems frequently involved with many serial killers, including Toguchi Kikuo, Nishizono Shinji (original) and Umemiya Akio. He refers to an unnamed woman as his "mama". He shows abnormal regenerative abilities (being able to completely regenerate his forearm) and wears earphone-like machines which can release endorphins to dull his sense of pain. He often uses guns with abnormally powerful firepower. As a punishment for "losing Tetora" as well as several other blunders, he was disfigured.

Kazuhiko Amamiya

The real Kazuhiko Amamiya (雨宮一彦, Amamiya Kazuhiko) first appears in chapter 10 in a flashback of "20 years ago" where he is apparently killed and burnt by Nishizono Shinji and Murata Kiyoshi. He reappears as an adult near Teu at the end of chapter 28 with a distinctive burn on the left side of his face and a later flashback reveals that he was rescued by an individual that appears to be Teu. He dies after being tricked by Nishizono Tetora into absorbing a destructive program.

Murata Kiyoshi

Somewhat shy and intellectually disabled, the real Murata Kiyoshi first appears in chapter 10 in a flashback of "20 years ago" where he assists the real Nishizono Shinji in disposing of the corpses of the other children and the nurse at Amamiya clinic. He refers to Shinji as "Shin-chan" and claims that he was the only one who did not bully him. He is burnt to death after a fire spreads to the oil that he is drenched with.

Lucy Monostone

Lucy Monostone (ルーシー·モノストーン), a deceased former American pop star and terrorist, is thought by the mysterious corporation at the heart of the conspiracy to be the perfect killer. While genetic engineering can recreate Monostone's body, the challenge appears to be recreating his soul in order for the ultimate murderer to be reborn. It seems that this can only be achieved by combining a number of personalities, representing the different parts of Monostone, into a single vessel.

=== Other characters ===
Tooru Sasayama (笹山 徹, Sasayama Tōru)

A bumbling police detective and friend of Kazuhiko and Machi. Short tempered and easily confused, Sasayama is nevertheless a "straight arrow" and reliably on the side of the good guys. After Kazuhiko Amamiya is taken over by Nishzono Shinji, Sasayama becomes a much more central character to the story.

Inuhiko

A police officer, introduced in Chapter 8 (Vol. 8). Plays a major role in the "Wings" case. Later on is suspected in the death of a Chinese doctor.

Uran Tenma

A police detective that partners with Sasayama, beginning in Chapter 8 (Vol. 8). Often made fun of by Sasayama for her short stature.

Akira Kitou

A high-ranked police officer introduced in Chapter 3 (Vol. 3). Despite his duties to Onihigata, he seems sincerely interested in unraveling the mysteries behind the murders and promoting justice and safety. He is the Spare of Tatsuo Onihigata, making the sole purpose of his existence to be an organ donor should original need one. He dies after a failed attempt to kill Onihigata, and ultimately donates his liver (unwillingly) to his would-be victim.

Tatsuo Onihigata

Minister of Justice of Japan. He is involved in the plot and is a manipulator.

Shoku Koike

A later employee of Machi Isono. He is the nephew of Lucy Monostone, and the supposed "perfect vessel" for the personalities that make up the soul of his uncle. He is killed by Nishizono Tetora while trying to retrieve the personality of Kazuhiko Amamiya.

Kikuo Toguchi

A journalistic photographer that often works along Sasayama at the time of the beginning of the story. He plays an important role in revealing the existence of the Shinji Nishizono personality to Machi Isono. His most recognizable feature is his eyepatch that often contain different pictures such as an eyeball, a smiley face, a barcode, (etc.) on its surface. After he learns that he has cataracts in his remaining eye, he reverts into the killer that all of the bar-code samples ultimately become.

Zenitsu

A field operative of Gakuso. He is thought to be immortal by many characters as he seems to survive every attack made on him, including being run over by a car, and falling with a helicopter which explodes crashes into a tower when the pilot is shot.

Candyman

Gakuso staff. Enjoys sweets and candy to a pitiful extent. Talks through a mechanical device attached to his neck. He was in charge of keeping Nishizono Tetora under control by supplying him with medicines which must be taken in sequential order based on the numbers printed on the pills. He calls these pills "candies". These medications stabilize Tetora's personalities and allow him to survive. However, when Sasayama supplies Tetora with the "zero candy", he is no longer reliant on the Candyman and kills him.

Teu Mimegumi

Gakuso staff. Often changes her name. Head of the Gakuso research boat. She is apparently involved with a faction of Gakuso that is in conflict with Onihigata.

== Media ==
=== Manga ===
==== Main storyline ====
MPD Psycho was initially published in Shōnen Ace, moving to Comic Charge in 2007 and remaining there until the magazine was cancelled in 2009. Then it moved again, this time to the new publication Young Ace, which debuted in the later half of 2009. The "Last Chapter" of MPD Psycho was published on February 4, 2016, and it was followed by "The End+ONE" on March 4. Dark Horse Comics published the English translation, but put the series on indefinite hiatus after volume 9 was released. Dark Horse announced in September 2010 it would resume MPD Psycho with the stabilization of the American manga market. The tenth volume was published in December 2011, followed by another hiatus that ended with the publication of the eleventh volume on July 23, 2014. The digital volumes of MPD Psycho were released on BookWalker on November 6, 2015.

No.	Original release date	Original ISBN	English release date	English ISBN
1	July 1, 1997	4-04-713188-1	June 6, 2007	978-1-59307-770-9
"File 01: Yousuke Kobayashi"; "File 02: Kazuhiko Amamiya"; "File 03: Tomoyo Tanabe"; "File 04: Flower Angel"; "File 05: Suguru Ueno"; "File 06: Kiyoshi Murata"
2	February 25, 1998	4-04-713210-1	September 5, 2007	978-1-59307-840-9
"File 07: A Martyr"; "File 08: Akira Moriizumi"; "File 09: The Organization Man"; "File 10: Kiyoshi Murata"; "File 11: Mina Amamiya"; "File 12: The Children of Twenty Years Past"
3	November 26, 1998	4-04-713260-8	December 5, 2007	978-1-59307-858-4
"File 13: Akio Umemiya 1"; "File 14: Akio Umemiya 2"; "File 15: Akira Kitou"; "File 16: Akio Umemiya 3"; "File 17: 2CV"; "File 18: Ghost"; "File 19: A Fellow Soldier"
4	June 25, 1999	4-04-713286-1	February 7, 2008	978-1593078973
"File 20: Kikuo Toguchi 1"; "File 21: Kikuo Toguchi 2"; "File 22: Kikuo Toguchi 3"; "File 23: Kikuo Toguchi 4"; "File 24: Sanae Suzuki"; "File 25: Lucy's Children"
5	April 11, 2000	4-04-713328-0	June 4, 2008	978-1-59307-962-8
"File 26: Lucy Seven 1"; "File 27: Michelle Partner 1"; "File 28: Lucy Hunter"; "File 29: Lucy Seven 2"; "File 30: Michelle Partner 2"; "File 31: Shinji Nishizono x 2"
6	October 27, 2000	4-04-713374-4	September 3, 2008	978-1-59307-996-3
"File 32: Awakening - Introduction - 1"; "File 33: Awakening - Introduction - 2"; "File 34: Noboru Asou "; "File 35: Psycho Fake 1"; "File 36: Psycho Fake 2"; "File 37: Psycho Fake 3"
7	August 29, 2001	4-04-713450-3	December 17, 2008	978-1-59582-202-4
"File 38: Kazuhiko Amamiya Returns 1"; "File 39: Kazuhiko Amamiya Returns 2"; "File 40: Kazuhiko Amamiya Returns 3"; "File 41: Philippines Drive 1"; "File 42: Kazuhiko Amamiya Returns 4"; "File 43: Kazuhiko Amamiya Returns 5"; "File 44: Philippines Drive 2"
8	August 28, 2002	4-04-713505-4	March 4, 2009	978-1-59582-263-5
"File 45: Kazuhiko Amamiya Returns 6"; "File 46: Kazuhiko Amamiya Returns 7"; "File 47: Angel Comes Here 1"; "File 48: Angel Comes Here 2"; "File 49: Angel Comes Here 3"; "File 50: Angel Comes Here 4"
9	August 1, 2003	4-04-713562-3	May 27, 2009	978-1-59582-330-4
"File 51: Angel Comes Here 5"; "File 52: Angel Comes Here 6"; "File 53: Angel Comes Here 7"; "File 54: Angel Comes Here 8"; "File 55: Angel Comes Here 9"; "File 56: Angel Comes Here 10"; "File 57: Angel Comes Here 11"; "File 58: Angel Comes Here 12"; "File 59: Angel Comes Here 13"
10	September 29, 2004	4-04-713661-1	November 16, 2011	978-1-59582-762-3
"File 60: God Jazz Time"; "File 61: Reincarnation 1"; "File 62: Reincarnation 2"; "File 63: Reincarnation 3"; "File 64: Reincarnation 4"; "File 65: Reincarnation 5"; "File 66: Reincarnation 6"; "File 67: Reincarnation 7"; "File 68: Reincarnation 8"
11	February 25, 2006	4-04-713787-1	July 23, 2014	978-1-61655-386-9
"dead man's galaxy days 1"; "dead man's galaxy days 2"; "dead man's galaxy days 3"; "dead man's galaxy days 4"; "dead man's galaxy days 5"; "dead man's galaxy days 6"; "dead man's galaxy days 7"; "dead man's galaxy days 8"
12	April 26, 2008	978-4-04-715053-9	—	—
"File 69: Vane"; "File 70: Teardrop"; "File 71: Groover"; "File 72: Outside"; "File 73: Christian while December"; "File 74: Time when you were there"; "File 75: Canary singing sky"; "File 76: Night watch"
13	January 5, 2009	978-4-04-715155-0	—	—
"File 77: Daydream Believers"; "File 78: OLIVE"; "File 79: Cross Road"; "File 80: Border Line"; "File 81: Day Watch"; "File 82: Outside Blues"; "File 83: Day Watch; "File 84: Melody of Star"; "File 85: Murder's High"
14	March 4, 2010	978-4-04-715389-9	—	—
"File 86: Crazy Hospital"; "File 87: Beat"; "File 88: Filth"; "File 89: Dream of Life"; "File 90: Story of the Devil"; "File 91: Fury"
15	December 2, 2010	978-4-04-715576-3	—	—
"File 92: ROLLIN' ROLLIN"; "File 93: Le prophéte"; "File 94: LIGHT MY FIRE"; "File 95: Break on Through"; "File 96: THE UNKNOWN SOLDIER"; "File 97: LOVELESS"; "File 98: LOVELESS II - A swing"; "File 99: NIGHTLINE"
16	March 1, 2012	978-4-04-715817-7	—	—
"File 100: Apocalypse Now"; "File 101: After Beat"; "File 102: Planet Magic"; "File 103: GHOST * Sweet * Heart"; "File 104: She died"; "File 105: Lullaby of the dawn"
17	August 30, 2012	978-4-04-120291-3	—	—
"File 106: Somehow, today"; "File 107: GOOD MORNING ASAGO"; "File 108: The Birdmen"; "File 109: Scorching Soul"; "File 110: True Colors"
18	January 31, 2013	978-4-04-120558-7	—	—
"File 111: EMPTY HEART"; "File 112: Thunder Road"; "File 113: Crazy Thunder Road"; "File 114: Good-bye, final weapon"; "File 115: Grasshopper"; "File 116: Evilspeak"
19	October 4, 2013	978-4-04-120558-7	—	—
"File 117: GO AHEAD!"; "File 118: Blind"; "File 119: Blind - 2"; "File 120: CRACKER"; "File 121: SPARK"; "File 122: BABY506"; "File 123: The edge of the world"
20	July 4, 2014	978-4-04-101399-1	—	—
"File 124: SOUL WARP"; "File 125: PHANTOM"; "File 126: THE THING THAT DOSE NOT END"; "File 127: TODAY"; "File 128: READY STEADY GO"
21	December 29, 2014	978-4-04-102283-2	—	—
"File 129: TRIPLE BARREL"; "File 130: Welcome The Ends"; "File 131: I'm Sorry"; "File 132: INTO THE WORLD"; "File 133: Residual"
22	July 4, 2015	978-4-04-103075-2	—	—
"File 134: Residual #2"; "File 135: Sloppy Blue"; "File 136: Phantasmal Citroen"; "File 137: FLY EYE"; "File 138: Get Up Lucy"
23	June 4, 2016	978-4-04-103404-0	—	—
"File 139: Rangeree Heart"; "File 140: Heart Tree"; "File 141: Dance * Number"; "File 142: Last Smile"; "File 143: Rangeree Attack"
24	July 4, 2016	978-4-04-104411-7	—	—
"File 144: TRASH"; "File 145: PAINT IT LOVE"; "File 146: CROSS OVER"; "THE END + ONE"

==== Supplemental ====
No.	Japanese release date	Japanese ISBN
1	March 4, 2010	4-04-713662-X
"The Truth of Lucy Monostone"
Fictional biographical book on the character Lucy Monostone, containing poetry and songs as well as other materials from the character's point of view.

==== Self-parody ====
Drawn by Hirarin

No.	Japanese release date	Japanese ISBN
1	August 1, 2003	4-04-713563-1
2	February 25, 2006	4-04-713780-4
3	August 23, 2007	978-4-04-713962-6
4	March 4, 2010	978-4-04-715378-3

=== Live-action series ===
The plot is similar to the beginning of the manga series but does not relate to the incidents of Lucy Monostone and the Gakuso Company. Yôsuke Kobayashi, a detective assigned to a homicide unit, saw his wife killed by a serial killer, Shinji Nishizono. From the shock of the incident, he suffers from dissociative identity disorder and becomes Kazuhiko Amamiya. Soon after he manages to hunt down and kill his wife's murderer. Now a series of murders have started and the suspect claimed to be Shinji Nishizono.
