= Sabu (film) =

2002 Japanese drama film

- Based on: Sabu by Shūgorō Yamamoto
- Screenplay by: Hiroshi Takeyama
- Directed by: Takashi Miike
- Music by: Kōji Endō
- Country of origin: Japan
- Original language: Japanese

Production
- Cinematography: Hideo Yamamoto
- Running time: 90 minutes (TV version); 121 minutes (theatrical version)

Original release
- Release: 2002

Sabu is a 2002 Japanese jidaigeki film directed by Takashi Miike and adapted from the classic Japanese rite-of-passage novel by Shūgorō Yamamoto. Originally broadcast as a 90-minute TV film, it was later given a 121-minute theatrical release.

== Plot ==
Eiji, Sabu, and Nobuko grow up as friends at the Kobunecho orphanage during the Edo period. Years later, Eiji is framed for the theft of a 100-ryo piece of gold cloth from the Watabun Bank and is sent to the Ishikawa Island workhouse. Refusing to speak, Eiji is dubbed "Bushu" by the head guard Ryojiro Kojima. Sabu is fired from his job as a paper hanger by Hokodo for his constant visits to see Eiji and is sent out into the country, where he develops beriberi. When Osue visits Eiji, Eiji explains that he believes that he was framed by Watabun and others who believed that Eiji intended to marry Watabun's daughter. Eiji insists that he had no such intention and that he only loves Osue but that she must forget about him because he has devoted his life to revenge.

The mistress of the geisha house where Nobuko works intends for her to marry 37-year-old Toku and take over as mistress of the house but Nobuko would rather run away with Sabu and Eiji. Osue visits her and Nobuko accuses Osue of stealing the gold cloth. Sabu steals food from his employer and is fired again, forcing him to return to the city.

Eiji breaks his leg saving another prisoner's life during the collapse of the frame of a building being constructed and is left with a permanent limp. A strong rainstorm creates a risk that the Okawa River will flood and leave the island underwater. Disgraced pimp Roku, who repeatedly raped Nobuko and was responsible for the suicide of her older sister, runs into a burning building to rescue a girl there. Eiji convinces the prisoners to work together to reinforce the workhouse and protect it against the flood. The violent new prisoner Giichi, known as the "Grass Snake", attacks Eiji but Eiji defeats him and his knife-wielding compatriot Ryu by beating them with his cherrywood cane. Instead of punishing Eiji, the head guard sends Giichi and Ryu to Denmacho and is paid by Sabu to send Eiji to Kitamachi court, where his case is reopened with a petition signed by 100 inmates and he is set free.

Sabu and Eiji return to Nobuko's house, where the mistress has ended up marrying Toku. Nobuko asks Eiji to marry her but he returns to Osue instead. Eiji finds a letter of apology written by Sabu and becomes enraged but Osue confesses that Sabu is protecting her and that she framed him for the theft because she wanted to marry him herself. Her father hears her confession and begs Eiji to punish him instead of her, but Eiji forgives her and takes her as his wife as she desired. Eiji visits Sabu, who puts on a display of apologizing for the theft. Eiji punches him, then embraces him.

== Cast ==
- Tatsuya Fujiwara as Eiji
- Satoshi Tsumabuki as Sabu
- Tomoko Tabata as Onobu
- Kazue Fukiishi as Osue
- Kenji Sawada as Okayasu
- Naomasa Rokudaira as Matsuda
- Tatsuo Yamada as Ryojiro Kojima
- Yoshiki Arizono as Yohei
- Keisuke Horibe
- Kenichi Endō as Giichi
- Naomasa Musaka
- Mayuko Nishiyama as Osono
- Ren Osugi as Heizo
- Hiroshi Tamaki as Kinta
- Yoji Tanaka as Toku

== Other credits ==
- First assistant director: Masato Tanno

== Production ==
The film was originally broadcast as a 90-minute TV film made to commemorate the 40th anniversary of the Nagoya Broadcasting Network, but was later given a 121-minute theatrical release.

== Bibliography ==
- Mes, Tom (2003). "Sabu (2002)". Agitator: The Cinema of Takashi Miike. Godalming: FAB Press. pp. 280–285, 397. ISBN 1-903254-21-3.
