= Katsumi Yanagishima =

Japanese cinematographer (born 1950)

Katsumi Yanagishima (柳島 克巳, Yanagishima Katsumi; born 1950, Gifu Prefecture), also credited as Katsumi Yanagijima, is a Japanese cinematographer.

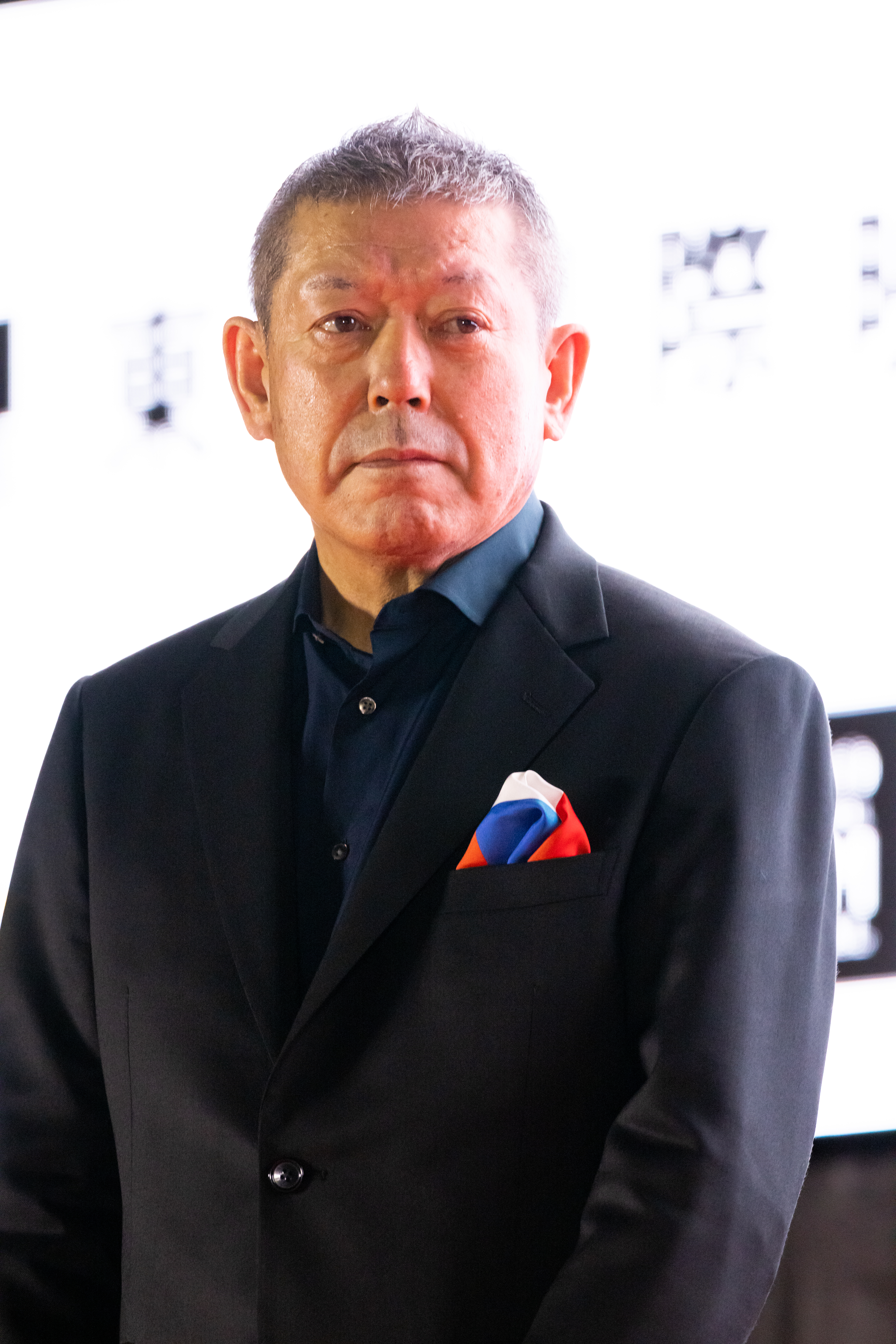
Yanagishima in 2022

== Career ==
Yanagishima has worked with Takeshi Kitano in many of his films, including A Scene at the Sea, Sonatine, Zatoichi, Kids Return, Kikujiro and Dolls. He won the Japan Academy Prize for best cinematography for Go! in 2002 and for Zatoichi in 2004. Battle Royale and The Grudge 2 are some of his other known films.

== Filmography ==
- A Scene at the Sea (1991)
- Sonatine (1993)
- Kids Return (1996)
- Ikinai (1998)
- Kikujiro (1999)
- Battle Royale (2000)
- Go (2001)
- Dolls (2002)
- Zatoichi (2003)
- The Grudge 2 (2006)
- Shutter (2008)
- Outrage (2010)
- Like Someone in Love (2012)
- Beyond Outrage (2012)
- Robo-G (2012)
- Midsummer's Equation (2013)
- Ryuzo and the Seven Henchmen (2015)
- Satoshi: A Move for Tomorrow (2016)
- Black Widow Business (2016)
