= Takeshi Kitano =

Japanese comedian, actor, and filmmaker

- 北野武
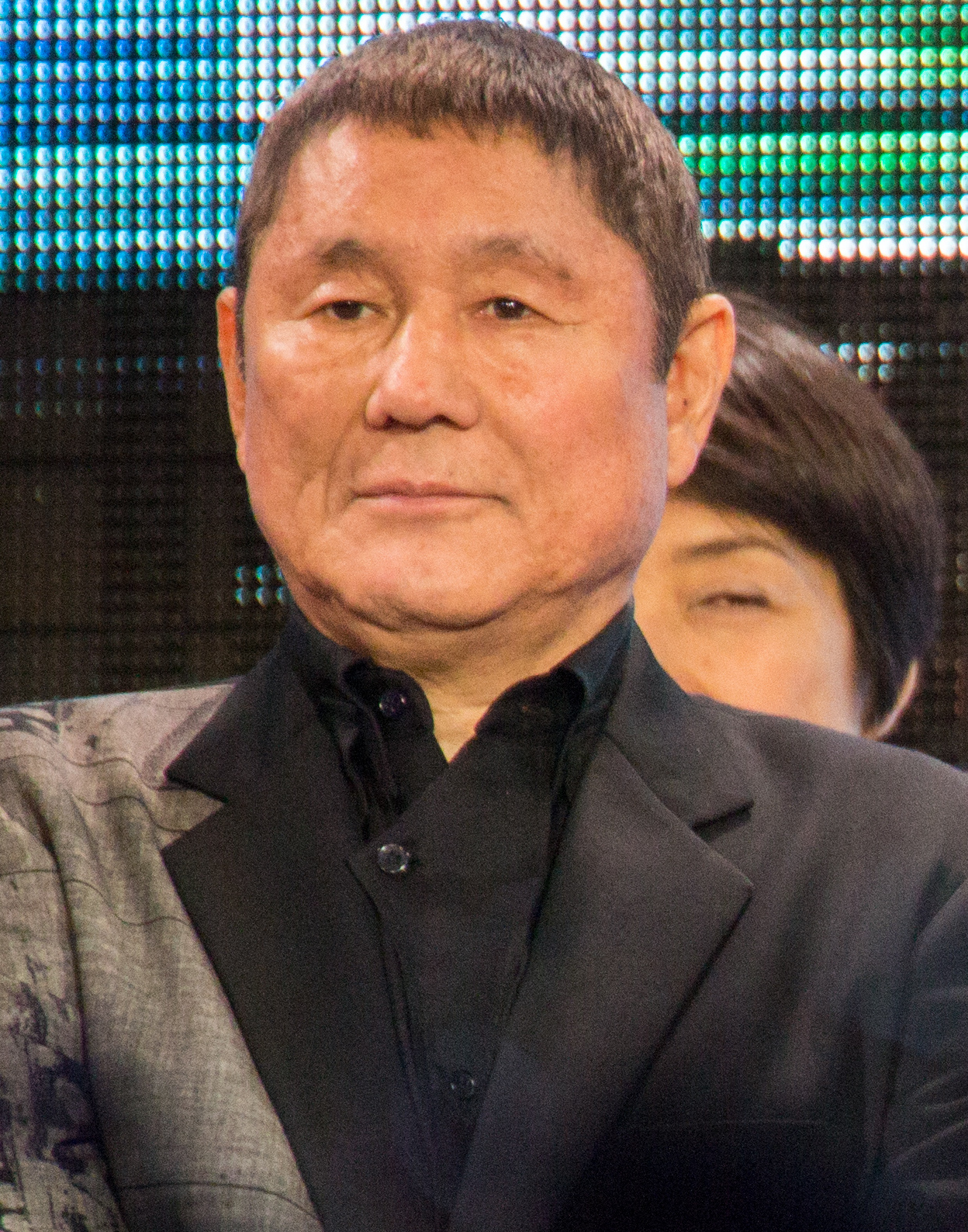
- Kitano in 2017
- Born: 18 January 1947 (age 79); Adachi, Tokyo, Japan
- Other name: Beat Takeshi (ビートたけし)
- Occupations: Comedian; actor; filmmaker
- Years active: 1969–present
- Notable work: Hana-bi (1997)
- Height: 168 cm (5 ft 6 in)
- Spouses: Mikiko Matsuda (m. 1980; div. 2019); Kiyoko Yokoi (m. 2020)
- Children: Shōko Kitano; Atsushi Kitano
- Awards: Golden Lion (1997)
- Website: takeshi-kitano.jp

Takeshi Kitano (北野 武, Kitano Takeshi (Note: Japanese: [kʲi̥taꜜno takeꜜɕi].); born 18 January 1947), also known as Beat Takeshi (Note: Japanese: [biːto takeꜜɕi].) (ビートたけし, Bīto Takeshi) in Japan, is a Japanese comedian, actor, and filmmaker. While he is known primarily as a comedian and TV host in his native Japan, he is better known abroad for his work as a film director and actor.

During his time as a student at Meiji University, he became a comedian at the strip theater France-za in Asakusa, Tokyo. In 1973, he formed a comedy duo called Two Beat with Kiyoshi Kaneko, who later became Beat Kiyoshi. Kitano adopted the stage name Beat Takeshi. Riding the wave of the comedy boom, he gained popularity with satirical and sharp-tongued black humor. In the 1980s, he appeared in TV shows such as Oretachi Hyōkin-zoku which recorded the highest viewership rating of 29.1%, and Takeshi's Castle which recorded 24.7%, becoming explosively popular on television. He gained recognition as an actor in director Nagisa Ōshima's film Merry Christmas, Mr. Lawrence (1983). In 1989, he made his directorial debut with the film Violent Cop after Kinji Fukasaku stepped down. He won the Golden Lion at the Venice Film Festival for his film Hana-bi (1997), becoming the third Japanese director to receive this honor after Akira Kurosawa and Hiroshi Inagaki. In October 2017, Kitano completed his Outrage crime trilogy with the release of Outrage Coda. He is also known internationally for hosting the game show Takeshi's Castle (1986–1990) and starring in the film Battle Royale (2000).

He has received critical acclaim for his idiosyncratic cinematic work, winning numerous awards with Japanese film critic Nagaharu Yodogawa having once dubbed him "the true successor" to influential filmmaker Akira Kurosawa. Many of Kitano's films are dramas about yakuza gangsters or the police. Described by critics as using an acting style that is highly deadpan or a camera style that approaches near-stasis, Kitano often uses long takes during which little appears to be happening, or editing that cuts immediately to the aftermath of an event. Many of his films express a bleak worldview, but are also filled with humor and affection for their characters.

== Life and career ==
=== Early life ===
Takeshi Kitano was born in Adachi, Tokyo, with two older brothers and an older sister. His father worked as a house painter, with Kitano revealing that he used to live like a yakuza, while his mother was a strict disciplinarian and educator who worked in a factory. In his working-class neighborhood, the children looked up to baseball players and yakuza, with many of his neighbors being the latter. Kitano entered Meiji University and studied engineering, before dropping out at age 19. He went to the Asakusa district in 1972 to become a comedian. While working as an elevator operator at the Asakusa France-za strip club, he became an apprentice of its comedian Senzaburo Fukami and eventually the theater's MC.

=== Comedy career and success ===
In the 1970s, he formed a comedy duo with his friend Nirō Kaneko (also called Kiyoshi Kaneko). They took on the stage names Beat Takeshi and Beat Kiyoshi; together referring to themselves as Two Beat (ツービート, Tsū Bīto; sometimes romanized as "The Two Beats"). This sort of duo comedy, known as manzai in Japan, usually features a great deal of high-speed back-and-forth banter between the two performers. Kiyoshi played the straight man (tsukkomi) against Takeshi's funny man (boke). In 1976, they performed on television for the first time and became a success, propelling their act onto the national stage. The reason for their popularity had much to do with Kitano's material, which was much more risqué than traditional manzai. The targets of his jokes were often the socially vulnerable, including the elderly, the handicapped, the poor, children, women, the ugly and the stupid. Complaints to the broadcaster led to censorship of some of Kitano's jokes and the editing of offensive dialogue. Kitano confirmed in a video interview that he was forbidden to access the NHK studios for five years for having exposed his body during a show when it was totally forbidden.

Although Two Beat was one of the most successful acts of its kind during the late 1970s and early 1980s, Kitano decided to go solo and the duo was dissolved. Together with Sanma Akashiya and Tamori, Kitano is said to be one of the "Big Three" television comedians (owarai tarento) of Japan. Some autobiographical elements relating to his manzai career can be found in his 1996 film Kids Return. Beat Kiyoshi has a bit part in Kitano's 1999 film Kikujiro, as "Man at the Bus Stop". Kitano had also become a popular television host. Takeshi's Castle was a game show hosted by Kitano in the 1980s, featuring slapstick-style physical contests. It was broadcast years later in the United States under the title Most Extreme Elimination Challenge, with Takeshi renamed "Vic Romano".

Many of Kitano's routines involved him portraying a gangster or other harsh characters. Kitano said that after playing comedy clubs he would be invited to drink with yakuza, who would tell him stories about the big crime bosses. His first major film role was in Nagisa Oshima's Merry Christmas, Mr. Lawrence (cast as a tough POW camp sergeant during World War II opposite Tom Conti, Ryuichi Sakamoto and David Bowie). Kitano said that he was happy with his performance and snuck into a showing of the film to see how the audience would accept him as a serious actor instead of a comedian. He was devastated when the audience burst into laughter upon his appearing on screen, but vowed to stick to serious and dark characters in film.

In 1986, Kitano worked on the Family Computer video game Takeshi no Chōsenjō (translated as Takeshi's Challenge), as a consultant and partial designer. He was the first Japanese celebrity to actively contribute to the development of a video game and starred in several commercials promoting its release. Due to the title's difficulty and confusing gameplay mechanics, it was placed first in Famitsu magazine's kusoge (shit game) ranking, and is often referred to as one of the worst video games of all time. Takeshi no Chōsenjō and its development was later the subject of the first episode of GameCenter CX, a gaming variety show hosted by Osaka comedian Shinya Arino. That same year, Kitano found himself in a legal incident when he stormed the editorial office of the weekly magazine Friday after it published an article accusing him of an affair.

In 1987, he appeared as the kayfabe manager of Big Van Vader at the NJPW Year End In Kokugikan event.

In 1988, he published a memoir, Asakusa Kid. He has also published a number of novels and other books which have been translated into French. He co-founded the Agency Office Kitano with Masayuki Mori.

After several other acting roles, mostly comedic, in 1989 he was cast as the lead in Violent Cop. When director Kinji Fukasaku stepped down over scheduling conflicts with Kitano, due to Kitano's TV commitments, the distributor suggested the comedian direct it at his own pace. He also rewrote the script heavily, and this marked the beginning of Kitano's career as a filmmaker.

=== 1990–2000: Film recognition ===
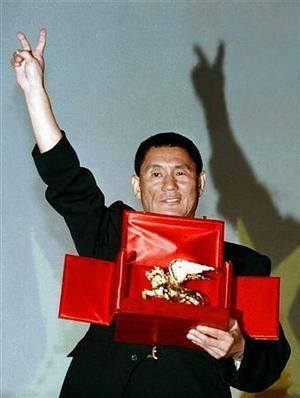
Kitano accepting the Golden Lion Award in 1997 for his film Hana-bi

Kitano's second film as director and first as screenwriter was Boiling Point (3-4X10 October) released in 1990. Mark Schilling cited it as the film in which Kitano defined his style with long takes, minimal camera movement, brief dialogue, sly humor, and sudden violence.

Kitano's third film, A Scene at the Sea, was released in 1991. It follows a deaf garbage collector who is determined to learn how to surf after discovering a broken surfboard. Kitano's more delicate, romantic side came to the fore here, along with his trademark deadpan approach. The film garnered numerous nominations and awards, including Best Film at the prestigious Blue Ribbon Awards. It also started a long-running collaboration with composer Joe Hisaishi, which would last until 2002.

Although 1993's Sonatine did poorly in Japan, it received rave reviews in Europe when it was shown at the 1993 Cannes Film Festival. Kitano plays a Tokyo yakuza who is sent by his boss to Okinawa to help end a gang war there. He is tired of gangster life, and when he finds out the whole mission is a ruse, he welcomes what comes with open arms. All four of his films were screened at the 1994 London Film Festival.

In August 1994, Kitano was involved in a motorscooter accident and suffered injuries that caused partial paralysis of the right-side of his face. As reported by Dan Edwards, Kitano later said that the accident was an "unconscious suicide attempt". Kitano made Kids Return in 1996, soon after his recovery.

The 1995 release of Getting Any? (Minna Yatteruka!), which was filmed before the accident, showed Kitano returning to his comedy roots. This Airplane!-like assemblage of comedic scenes, all centering loosely around a Walter Mitty-type character trying to have sex in a car, met with little acclaim in Japan. Much of the film satirizes popular Japanese culture, such as Ultraman or Godzilla and even the Zatoichi character that Kitano himself would go on to play eight years later. That year Kitano also appeared in the film adaptation of William Gibson's 1995 Johnny Mnemonic, credited by the mononym "Takeshi", although his on-screen time was greatly reduced for the American cut of the film.

After his motorscooter accident, Kitano took up painting. His paintings have been published in books, featured in gallery exhibitions, and adorn the covers of many of the soundtrack albums for his films. His paintings were featured prominently in his most critically acclaimed film, 1997's Hana-bi. Although for years already Kitano's largest audience had been the foreign arthouse crowd, Hana-bi cemented his status internationally as one of Japan's foremost modern filmmakers. Although it was not a big success financially, it won the Golden Lion award at the 1997 Venice Film Festival. Kitano himself said it was not until he won this award that he was accepted as a serious director in Japan; prior his films were looked at as just the hobby of a famous comedian.

Among his most significant acting roles were Nagisa Oshima's 1999 film Taboo, in which he played Captain Hijikata Toshizo of the Shinsengumi. Kikujiro, released in 1999 and named after his father, was a semi-comedy featuring Kitano as a ne'er-do-well crook who winds up paired up with a young boy looking for his mother, and goes on a series of misadventures with him.

He hosted Koko ga Hen da yo Nihonjin (English translation, This doesn't make sense, Japanese people!) which was a Japanese TV show that was broadcast weekly from 1998 to 2002, a talk show on which a large panel of Japanese-speaking foreigners from around the world debate current issues in Japanese society. He hosted Unbelievable, until 6 March 2024 when comedian duo Bananaman took over, as well as the weekly television program Beat Takeshi's TV Tackle. TV Tackle is a kind of panel discussion among entertainers and politicians regarding controversial current events. Another of his shows is Sekai Marumie TV ("The World Exposed"), a weekly collection of various interesting video clips from around the world, often focusing on the weird aspects of other countries. On this show, he plays a childlike idiot, insulting the guests, and usually appearing wearing strange costumes during the show.

=== 2000–present ===
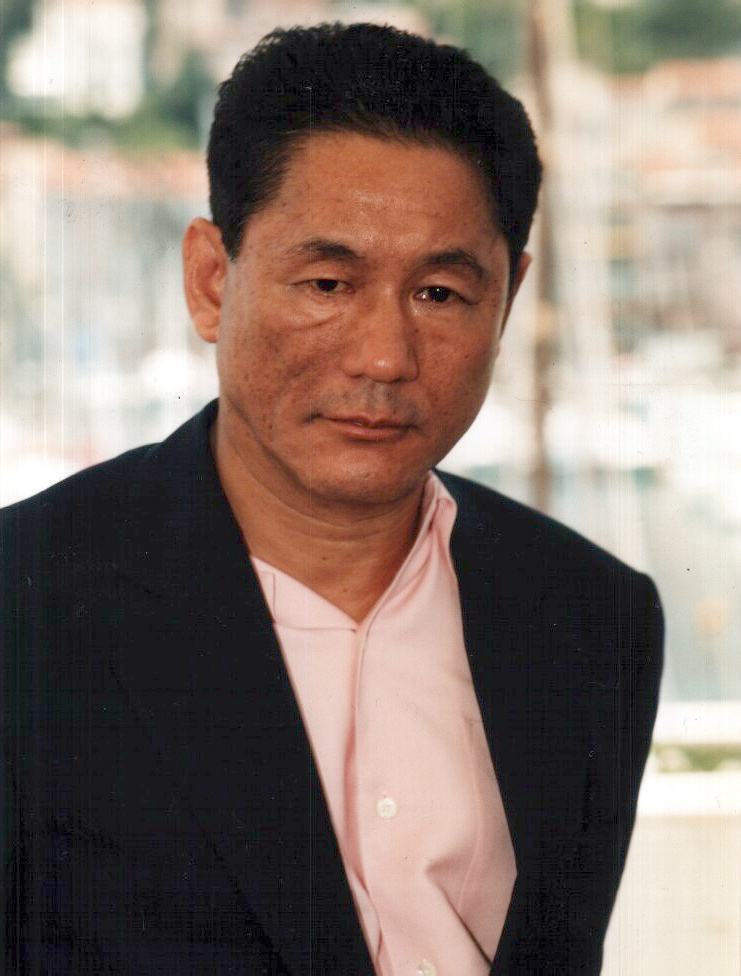
Kitano at the Cannes Film Festival in 2000

Kitano played a similarly named character in the controversial 2000 Japanese blockbuster Battle Royale, which takes place in a future in which a group of teenagers are randomly selected each year to eliminate each other on a deserted island.

His 2000 film Brother was deliberately intended to be a hit abroad. Shot in Los Angeles, it starred Kitano as a deposed and exiled Tokyo yakuza setting up a drug empire in Los Angeles with the aid of a local gangster played by Omar Epps. However, the film met with tepid international response. Although in Japan it did better financially than Hana-bi. Dolls in 2002 had Kitano directing but not starring in a romantic drama with three different stories about undying love, and was loosely based on a bunraku play.

Following the disappointing response to the film Brother and the film Dolls, Kitano received a sequence of unsympathetic reviews from the press in the United States. Criticism was less severe in Europe and Asia though many commentators were not as lavish with their praise as they had been with his previous films. 2003's Zatōichi, directed by and starring Kitano, silenced many of these dissenters. With a new take on the character from Shintaro Katsu's long-running film and TV series, Zatōichi was Kitano's biggest box office success in Japan, did quite well in limited release across the world, and won countless awards at home and abroad, including the Silver Lion award at the Venice Film Festival. Kitano revealed that he was approached by others to create the film and therefore differed from his own techniques and followed the common filmmaking process in order to please them and make a pure-entertainment film.

From April 2005 to 2008, Kitano was an instructor at the Graduate School of Visual Arts, Tokyo University of the Arts.

Kitano's film, Takeshis' was released in Japan in November 2005, as the first installment in his surrealist autobiographical series. This was followed in 2007, by his second surrealist autobiographical film Glory to the Filmmaker! (appearing as Beat Takeshi), and a third in 2008, titled Achilles and the Tortoise. In between these films, Kitano appeared in a number of other television projects and smaller projects. In 2007 he appeared in Dots and Lines (a TV mini-series) as Jūtarō Torikai. Also in 2007, Kitano appeared in To Each His Own Cinema as the projectionist (in the segment "Rencontre unique") as Beat Takeshi, and in the TV movie Wada Akiko Satsujin Jiken. In 2008, he did the voice-over in The Monster X Strikes Back: Attack the G8 Summit, for Take-Majin, a heroic monster based on Kitano.

In 2010, the Fondation Cartier pour l'art contemporain in Paris held a one-man show displaying his paintings and installations. A room in the basement played a 12-hour loop of his work as a TV host.

Kitano's 2010 film Outrage was screened at the 2010 Cannes Film Festival. He admitted he tried something different for Outrage by adding a lot of dialogue, stepping back as the main character to make an ensemble piece, and having the feel of a nature documentary watching the characters kill each other. A sequel, 2012's Outrage Beyond, was screened in competition at the 69th Venice International Film Festival. He also appeared in Yasuo Furuhata's 2012 film, Dearest. In September 2012, Takeshi Kitano said that the producers wanted him to make a third Outrage film depending on the box office. On 7 March 2013, Minkei News of Hong Kong reported that Kitano won the Best Director award for Outrage Beyond at the 7th Asian Film Awards in Hong Kong.

On 10 August 2013, in an interview reported by John Bleasdale, Kitano revealed his current plans for a sequel to Outrage Beyond and an untitled personal film project. As Kitano stated, "Ideally what would happen would be this: Outrage Beyond becomes a huge hit, so huge that my producer allows me to make one film I really want to do and then come back to the sequel after I've made the film I really want to do."

In September 2015, it was announced that Kitano would be contributing his voice and likeness to the character Toru Hirose in the SEGA video game Yakuza 6: The Song of Life. This collaboration marked Kitano's first involvement with the video game industry in 30 years since the 1986 release of Takeshi no Chōsenjō.

Takeshi co-starred in the live action adaptation of the manga Ghost in the Shell, marking his return to American cinema nearly twenty years after Johnny Mnemonic in 1995. Although he has expressed his dislike of anime and manga in the past, he accepted the role because "even though this stylish piece of entertainment is totally different from the films I've directed, I thought it was interesting that Aramaki, the role I play, is a character who gives off a peculiar vibe and, in various episodes, is set at the core of the characters' relationships. I'm looking forward to see how the movie turns out."

In 2017, Kitano released the third and final installment in the successful Outrage series titled Outrage Coda.

He left Office Kitano in 2018 and became affiliated with T.N Gon [jp].

Kitano's samurai film Kubi about the Honnō-ji Incident premiered at the 2023 Cannes Film Festival.

== Awards ==
Kitano won the Golden Lion award at the 54th Venice International Film Festival in 1997 for his film Hana-bi. In 2008, at the 30th Moscow International Film Festival, Kitano was given the Lifetime Achievement Award. In March 2010 Kitano was named a Commander of the Order of the Arts and Letters of France. On 29 April 2022 he received the Golden Mulberry Lifetime Achievement Award at the 24th Far East International Film Festival of Udine 2022, in Italy.

== Agency ==
1988–2018.3: Office Kitano Office Kitano Inc. (株式会社オフィス北野, Kabushiki-Gaisha Ofisu Kitano) is a Japanese talent management company founded in February 1988 by Kitano. In March 2018 Kitano left Office Kitano in order to become independent. Following this the company changed its name to TAP on 1 January 2020.

2018.4-: T.N Gon. In 2015, Kitano established T.N Gon (株式会社T.N Gon, Kabushiki-Gaisha T N Gon).

== Filmography ==
=== Feature films ===
Year	English Title	Original Title	Director	Writer	Editor	Notes
1989	Violent Cop	その男、凶暴につき	Yes	Uncredited	No	Re-wrote the entire original screenplay by Hisashi Nozawa
1990	Boiling Point	3-4x10月	Yes	Yes	No	
1991	A Scene at the Sea	あの夏、いちばん静かな海。	Yes	Yes	Yes	
1993	Sonatine	ソナチネ	Yes	Yes	Yes	
1995	Getting Any?	みんな～やってるか！	Yes	Yes	Yes	Credited as "Beat Takeshi"
1996	Kids Return	キッズ・リターン	Yes	Yes	Yes	
1997	Hana-bi		Yes	Yes	Yes	Also drawings and paintings
1999	Kikujiro	菊次郎の夏	Yes	Yes	Yes	
2000	Brother	ブラザー	Yes	Yes	Yes	
2002	Dolls	ドールズ	Yes	Yes	Yes	
2003	Zatōichi	座頭市	Yes	Yes	Yes	
2005	Takeshis'		Yes	Yes	Yes	
2007	To Each His Own Cinema	Chacun son cinéma : une déclaration d'amour au grand écran	Yes	Yes	Yes	Omnibus film, segment "One Fine Day"; Also producer
2007	Glory to the Filmmaker!	監督·ばんざい!	Yes	Yes	Yes	
2008	Achilles and the Tortoise	アキレスと亀	Yes	Yes	Yes	
2010	Outrage	アウトレイジ	Yes	Yes	Yes	Also executive producer
2012	Beyond Outrage	アウトレイジ ビヨンド	Yes	Yes	Yes	Also executive producer
2015	Ryuzo and the Seven Henchmen	龍三と七人の子分たち	Yes	Yes	Yes	
2017	Outrage Coda	アウトレイジ 最終章	Yes	Yes	Yes	
2023	Kubi	首	Yes	Yes	Yes	Also based on his novel and producer
2024	Broken Rage		Yes	Yes	Yes	

==== As actor ====
- Go, Go, Second Time Virgin (1969)
- Shinjuku Mad (1970)
- Makoto-chan (1980)
- Dump Migratory Bird (1981)
- Manon (1981)
- Sukkari... Sono Kide (1981)
- Secret of Summer (1982)
- Merry Christmas, Mr. Lawrence (1983)
- Mosquito on the Tenth Floor (1983)
- Kanashii kibun de joke (1985)
- Yasha (1985)
- Comic Magazine (1986)
- Anego (1988)
- Violent Cop (1989)
- Boiling Point (1990)
- Setsuna Kimono, Sore wa Ai (1990)
- Hoshi wo tsugu mono (1990)
- A Legend of Turmoil (1992)
- Dioxin from Fish! (1992)
- Erotic Liaisons (1992)
- Silver Ball (1992)
- Sonatine (1993)
- Kyoso Tanjo (1993)
- Getting Any? (1995)
- Johnny Mnemonic (1995)
- Gonin (1995)
- Hana-bi (1997)
- Tokyo Eyes (1998)
- Kikujiro (1999)
- Taboo (1999)
- Remains of Chivalry Zankyo (1999)
- Brother (2000)
- Battle Royale (2000) as Kitano
- Zatoichi (2003)
- Battle Royale II: Requiem (2003)
- Izo (2004)
- Blood and Bones (2004)
- The Golden Cups One More Time (2004)
- Takeshis' (2005)
- Arakimentari (2005)
- Glory to the Filmmaker! (2007)
- The Monster X Strikes Back/Attack the G8 Summit (2008) - Take-Majin
- Achilles and the Tortoise (2008)
- Outrage (2010)
- Dearest (2012)
- Beyond Outrage (2012)
- Ryuzo 7 (2015)
- Mozu (2015)
- While the Women Are Sleeping (2016)
- Ghost in the Shell (2017) - Chief Daisuke Aramaki
- Outrage Coda (2017)
- Kubi (2023) - Hashiba Hideyoshi
- Broken Rage (2024) - Nezumi

=== Television ===
- Thousand Stars and One Night (1980–1981)
- The Manzai (1980–1982)
- Oretachi Hyōkin-zoku (1981–1989)
- Bakumatsu Seishun Graffiti: Sakamoto Ryōma (1982), Yamauchi Yōdō
- Laugh and Pon! (1983)
- Super Jockey (1983–1999)
- Sports Taisho (1985–1990)
- Owarai Ultra Quiz (1989–1996, 2007)
- Genki TV (1985–1996)
- Takeshi's Castle (1986–1990)
- TV Tackle (1989–present)
- Heisei Board of Education (1991–1997)
- Sekai marumie! Terebi tokusôbu (1991–present)
- Daredemo Picasso (1997–present)
- Kiseki Taiken! Anbiribabō (1997–present)
- Koko ga Hen da yo Nihonjin (1998–2002)
- Musashi (2003)
- Medical Horror Check Show (2004-2009)
- Quiz $ Millionaire (2009)
- Fuji Television midnight broadcasting series (1991–present)

Kitano Fan Club
Kitano Fuji
Adachi-ku no Takeshi, Sekai no Kitano
Saitoh Singu-ten
Kitano Talent Meikan
Takeshi Kitano presents Comăneci University Mathematics

- Aka Medaka (2015)
- Hagoku (2017)
- Idaten (2019), Kokontei Shinshō V
- Two Homelands (2019), Hideki Tojo

== Radio ==
- All Night Nippon by Beat Takeshi (1981–1990)
- Beatnik Radio (1997–2000)
- Beat Takeshi's literary night talk (NRN)
- International men's friendship book show

== Books ==
- Gerow, Aaron (2007). Kitano Takeshi. British Film Institute. ISBN 978-1-84457-166-6.
- Abe, Casio (2005). Beat Takeshi vs. Takeshi Kitano. Kaya Press. ISBN 1-885030-40-1.
- Kitano, Takeshi (1988). Asakusa Kid. Japan: Shincho-Sha.
- Kitano, Takeshi (1998). Asakusa Kid. Paris: Motifs. ISBN 2842612795.
- Kitano, Takeshi (2003). Rencontres du Septième Art. Arléa. ISBN 2869596197.
- Kitano, Takeshi (2005). Naissance d'un Gourou. Editions Denoël. ISBN 2207254917.
- Kitano, Takeshi (2008). La Vie en gris et rose. Philippe Picquier. ISBN 978-2809700220.
- Kitano, Takeshi (2012). Boy. Wombat. ISBN 978-2919186136.

== Video games ==
=== As designer ===
- Takeshi no Chōsenjō (1986)

=== As actor ===
- Yakuza 6: The Song of Life (2016), Toru Hirose
