= Masayuki Mori (film producer) =

Japanese film producer (born 1953)

- Born: 1953 (age 72–73); Tottori, Japan
- Occupation: Film producer

Masayuki Mori (森昌行, Mori Masayuki; born 1953 in Tottori, Japan) is a Japanese film producer. He is best known for collaborating as a producer for films made by actor and filmmaker Takeshi Kitano under Kitano's production company, Office Kitano.

== Career ==
Mori graduated from Aoyama Gakuin University in 1976. He joined Super Produce Inc., a Japanese TV production company, directing several TV programs for Takeshi Kitano. In 1988, Mori became a key member in the establishment of Kitano's production company Office Kitano. Mori continues to produce films under the Office Kitano production banner.
