= 10th Yokohama Film Festival =

1989 Japanese film festival edition

- Location: Kannai Hall, Yokohama, Kanagawa, Japan
- Founded: 1980
- Festival date: 12 February 1989

The 10th Yokohama Film Festival (第10回ヨコハマ映画祭) was held on 12 February 1989 in Kannai Hall, Yokohama, Kanagawa, Japan.

== Awards ==
- Best Film: Rock yo shizukani nagareyo
- Best New Actor: Otokogumi (Shoji Narita, Kazuya Takahashi, Kenichi Okamoto, and Koyo Maeda) – Rock yo shizukani nagareyo
- Best Actor: Hiroyuki Sanada – Kaitō Ruby
- Best Actress: Kyōko Koizumi – Kaitō Ruby
- Best New Actress: Yukari Tachibana – Neko no Yōni
- Best Supporting Actor: Tsurutarō Kataoka – The Discarnates
- Best Supporting Actress: Shuko Honami – Ureshi Hazukashi Monogatari
- Best Director:
  - Shūsuke Kaneko – Summer Vacation 1999, Last Cabaret
  - Shunichi Nagasaki – Rock yo shizukani nagareyo
- Best New Director: Koji Enokido – Futari Botchi
- Best Screenplay: Shoichi Maruyama – Futari Botchi, Rabu sutori o kimini
- Best Cinematography: Kenji Takama – Summer Vacation 1999

== Best 10 ==
1. Rock yo shizukani nagareyo
2. My Neighbor Totoro
3. Futari Botchi
4. The Discarnates
5. Revolver
6. Kaitō Ruby
7. Kono Mune no Tokimeki wo
8. Summer Vacation 1999
9. Last Cabaret
10. Grave of the Fireflies

runner-up. Kaisha monogatari: Memories of You
runner-up: So What
