= Yuriko Nakamura =

Japanese musician

Yuriko Nakamura (中村 由利子, Nakamura Yuriko) is a Japanese composer and pianist. Some of her songs were also used for the soundtrack of Shusuke Kaneko's Summer Vacation 1999.

== Discography (solo albums) ==
- Kaze no Kagami (Wind and Reflection)/ Sony / 32DP735 -1987
- Toki no Hanataba (Bouquet of Time)/ Sony / 32DP5072 -1988
- Kinu no Bara (Silky Roses) / Sony / CSCS5002 -1989
- Antim / Sony / CSCS5363 -1991
- Atelier no Kyujitsu (Holiday of Atelier)/ FOR LIFE / FLCF3501 -1994
- Dreamy Winter / FOR LIFE / FLCF3533 -1994
- Jet Stream [Single] / FOR LIFE / FLDF1550 -1995
- Yume no Toki he (To Time of Dream) / FOR LIFE / FLCF3598 -1995
- In Concert Piano Fantasy / TRUE PROJECT / PEN1001 -1998
- Solo Best - Dear Green Field / UNIVERSAL / UMCK1068 -2001
- Melodious Life / TRUE PROJECT / PEN1002 -2002
- LOVERS (Koibito tachi) / TOKUMA JAPAN / TKCA72858 -2005
- Korea ga Aishita Piano (Piano Korean loved)－Yuriko Nakamura Best / United Asia Entertainment / JKCA-1024 -2006
- The Place to Return (2007)
