= Beautiful Wrestlers: Down for the Count =

- Theatrical release poster
- Kanji: 美少女プロレス 失神１０秒前
- Revised Hepburn: Bishôjo puroresu: shisshin 10-byo mae
- Directed by: Hiroyuki Nasu
- Written by: Toshimichi Saeki
- Produced by: Akihiko Yatsumaki
- Starring: Natsuko Yamamoto; Kaoru Oda; Mai Inoue
- Cinematography: Masaru Mori
- Edited by: Yoshiyuki Okuhara
- Production company: Nikkatsu
- Release date: January 13, 1984 (Japan)
- Running time: 72 minutes
- Country: Japan
- Language: Japanese

Beautiful Wrestlers: Down for the Count (Japanese: 美少女プロレス 失神１０秒前, Hepburn: Bishôjo puroresu: shisshin 10-byo mae) is a 1984 Japanese film in Nikkatsu Studios' Roman Porno period, directed by Hiroyuki Nasu.

== Premise ==
Megu enrolls in an extracurricular girls' wrestling club, but things are not quite what she expected. She soon learns the club's training program includes humiliating sexual submission to the senior female wrestlers and that the club's finances are secured with the prostitution of the girls to the members of a nearby all-male wrestling club. Megu's life is further strained when a rival wrestler Shinobu (Kaoru Ada) shows interest in her new boyfriend. This tension erupts at a no-holds-barred wrestling match. Megu's strength is pushed to the limit but she has a secret weapon, superhuman strength whenever she inserts her tampon.

== Cast ==
- Natsuko Yamamoto as Megu Shinohara
- Kaoru Oda as Shinobu Yokoyama
- Ryoko Watanabe as Aya Matsumori
- Makoto Yoshino as Junko Tateno
- Kiriko Shimizu as Mami Shinohara
- Mai Inoue as Mayumi Hori
- Naomi Hagio as Akiko Yamakura
- Rika Ishii as Kaori Ichinose
- Miyuki Amano as Kyôko Shiraki
- Michiru Beppu as Yoshiko Kawamoto
- Hiroshi Fukami as Ukai
- Tamaki Komiyama as Nakatsu
- Sakae Matsuzawa as Naomi Yamashita
- Chino Sato as Saeko Ikeshita
- Katsumi Sawada as Kazuo Mashiro
- Sanae Takada as Norie Toriyama
- Hiroshi Takayama as Morishita
- Tomoyuki Taura as Ryûma Yamada
- Hitomi Yuri as Sumire Kôzuki
- Yasuharu Ôkubo as Kurauchi

== Production ==
Director Nasu shot Beautiful Wrestler: Down for the Count to fulfill contractual obligations with Nikkatsu before moving on to Toei.

== Bibliography ==
- Weisser, Thomas; Yuko Mihara Weisser (1998). Japanese Cinema Encyclopedia: The Sex Films. Miami: Vital Books : Asian Cult Cinema Publications. p. 313. ISBN 1-889288-52-7.
