= Summer Vacation 1999 =

1988 film by Shūsuke Kaneko

- Japanese DVD cover
- Directed by: Shusuke Kaneko
- Screenplay by: Rio Kishida
- Based on: The Heart of Thomas by Moto Hagio
- Cinematography: Kenji Takama
- Music by: Yuriko Nakamura
- Distributed by: Shochiku
- Release date: March 26, 1988 (Japan)
- Running time: 90 minutes
- Country: Japan
- Language: Japanese

Summer Vacation 1999 (Japanese: 1999年の夏休み, Hepburn: Sen-kyūhyaku-kyūjūkyū-nen no Natsuyasumi) is a 1988 Japanese sci-fi ghost-story film directed by Shusuke Kaneko, adapted from the manga series The Heart of Thomas by Moto Hagio. It follows the lives of four students alone in a remote all-boys boarding school with no one else on their summer vacations. It concerns the relationships between the pupils after one of their classmates commits suicide, and then apparently returns as a double. Although the manga concerns homoerotic relationships among the boys, director Kaneko used girls, aged 14 to 16, to portray the boys in the film. The film contains elements of science fiction and suspense/horror films, but also high-school drama and romance.

== Cast ==
- Eri Miyajima as Yu / Kaoru
  - Minami Takayama as the voice of Yu / Kaoru
- Tomoko Ōtakara as Kazuhiko
  - Nozomu Sasaki as the voice of Kazuhiko
- Miyuki Nakano as Naoto
  - Hiromi Murata as the voice of Naoto
- Eri Fukatsu as Norio
- Masaaki Maeda as Narrator

== Release ==
Summer Vacation 1999 was released theatrically in Japan by Shochiku on March 26, 1988. It was shown as part of the New Directors/New Films Festival at the Museum of Modern Art in New York City in March 1989. The film was also later screened at the 2001 Dutch Transgender Film Festival (NTGF). In March 2014, Summer Vacation 1999 was part of the program honoring film critic Donald Richie at the Japan Society of New York. The film inspired the song Summer Holiday 1999 by Momus.

== Reception ==
At the 10th Yokohama Film Festival in 1989, the film was ranked number 8 in the Best 10 Films of the year. At the same festival, director Shusuke Kaneko won the Best Director award for his work on this film and his other 1988 entry Last Cabaret, and Kenji Takama won the award for Best Cinematography. The film was also nominated for the Best Editing Award at the 12th Japan Academy Film Prizes.
