= He's Expecting =

Japanese manga series by Eri Sakai

- English tankōbon volume cover, featuring Kentaro Hiyama

ヒヤマケンタロウの妊娠 (Hiyama Kentarō no Ninshin)
- Genre: Drama, Josei, Slice of life, Supernatural
- Manga
- Written by: Eri Sakai
- Published by: Kodansha
- English publisher: NA: Kodansha USA
- Imprint: Kodansha Comics BL
- Magazine: Be Love
- Original run: August 11, 2012 – November 3, 2012
- Volumes: 1
- Manga

Kentaro Hiyama's First Pregnancy: Childcare Edition
- Written by: Eri Sakai
- Published by: Kodansha
- Imprint: Kodansha Comics BL
- Magazine: Be Love
- Original run: August 1, 2019 – September 1, 2020
- Volumes: 2
- Manga

Kentaro Hiyama's First Pregnancy: Separate Volume
- Written by: Eri Sakai
- Published by: Kodansha
- Imprint: Kodansha Comics BL
- Magazine: Be Love
- Original run: January 5, 2023 – February 3, 2023
- Volumes: 1
- Television drama
- He's Expecting (2022)

He's Expecting, also known as Kentaro Hiyama's First Pregnancy (Japanese: ヒヤマケンタロウの妊娠, Hepburn: Hiyama Kentarō no Ninshin; lit. 'The Pregnancy of Kentarō Hiyama'), is a Japanese manga series written and illustrated by Eri Sakai. It is set in a world where males are able to become pregnant; the story follows Kentaro Hiyama, an elite ad salaryman who discovers he is pregnant. Kentaro Hiyama's First Pregnancy was serialized in Kodansha's bimonthly (at the time) Be Love Magazine from August 2012 to November 2012 and was collected into a single tankōbon volume.

The sequel Kentaro Hiyama's First Pregnancy: Childcare Edition (ヒヤマケンタロウの妊娠 育児編, Hiyama Kentarō no Ninshin Ikuji-hen; lit. 'The Pregnancy of Kentarō Hiyama Childcare') was serialized in Kodansha's monthly Be Love Magazine from August 2019 to September 2020 and has been collected into 2 tankōbon volumes.

A third installment one-shot, titled Kentaro Hiyama's First Pregnancy: Separate Volume (ヒヤマケンタロウの妊娠 分冊版, Hiyama Kentarō no Ninshin Bunsatsu-ban; lit. 'The Pregnancy of Kentarō Hiyama Separate Volume'), was released on January 5, 2023. Sakai hinted that this would be the final installment, though she has expressed interest in writing another one in the future.

During their panel at New York Comic Con in 2023, Kodansha USA announced that they licensed the entire manga in digital-only formats under one title.

A live-action drama series loosely based on the manga was co-produced by Netflix and TV Tokyo, with Takumi Saitoh portraying Kentaro Hiyama. The first season of the Netflix Original Series began streaming on April 21, 2022.

== Synopsis ==
=== Setting ===
Ten years before the start of the series, men around the world started becoming pregnant in an almost serendipitous, or in some cases inconvenient way, though not as often with women; there is a one out of ten chance of it happening. The only way for men to give birth is via C-section. While it is possible for men to get an abortion, it is considered far more dangerous for men to do it as opposed to women. The subject of pregnant men is controversial with some people treating pregnant men in an almost indifferent or prejudiced way.

=== Plot ===
==== Kentaro Hiyama's First Pregnancy ====
Kentaro Hiyama is a 32-year-old elite salaryman who discovers that he is pregnant. Embarrassed by his unexpected problem, he is unsure whether he should keep the baby or not. He begins to take notice of the prejudice towards pregnant women and starts developing symptoms that lead to him calling his mother and asking how she felt about raising him on her own after his father died. After an encounter with a woman on a women-only passenger car, who quickly deduces his pregnancy and shows compassion by offering him to sit with them, he is further pushed to potentially keep the child. His coworker Yuichi Sato outs his pregnancy to a younger female employee who reveals her ignorant views on male pregnancy; believing he became pregnant from another man. Kentaro attempts to correct her and realizes that he must change people's perspective about male pregnancy while also deciding to keep the baby.

The rest of the manga deals with other characters close to Kentaro who are all going through similar situations of their own.

Mizuki Kawabata, the woman on the train, is also pregnant, but is in a relationship with an unfaithful boyfriend who claims that he is breaking up with his other girlfriend to be with her. However, it quickly becomes apparent that he wants her to get an abortion and marry his current girlfriend instead. When she learns that Kentaro is single and having his baby regardless, she dumps her boyfriend and announces to her coworkers her pregnancy.

Tsubasa Utsumi is a teenager who had sex and became pregnant with his girlfriend Satome's baby. His parents forced him to get an abortion and while successful has caused a rift between him and his girlfriend. Tsubasa's friends still mock pregnant men until they encounter Kentaro who gives them a stern talking to. Tsubasa learns that Satome's parents want them to break up, but after learning that Kentaro is building a restaurant that caters to pregnant and nursing people, he is encouraged to make amends with Satome and they resume their relationship.

30-year-old freelance journalist Aki Seto vehemently tells her friends that she does not want to settle and have kids. She ends up sleeping with Kentaro where they continue to see one another until they drift apart. Kentaro shows back up at her place to announce his pregnancy, which shocks her, though surprisingly she is baffled that he does not want anything from her. Aki learns that one of her friends became pregnant and is happy and she slowly begins to warm up to the idea of being a mother. Aki tells Kentaro that she can pretend to be married to him in case the paparazzi want to sensationalize his story.

Noriko Miyaji's husband is pregnant with their second child. She is envious because she was pregnant with their son Takuya and wanted to have their next baby. She is also upset that he disregards the hard work she is doing and the job she is having while he sits around the house and openly voices her displeasure of pregnant men while also hiding her husband's condition from everyone. Noriko begins to idolize her boss and his wife who have a close relationship. One day, Mr. Miyaji finds Kentaro's new restaurant "Papa & Kids" and begins to enjoy eating there. Noriko is upset upon seeing him and argues with him when he returns home. While out with Takuya, Noriko meets with her boss and his wife and discovers that they are unable to have children of their own. Takuya lets slip that his father is pregnant and the boss' wife admits that she is jealous. Noriko realizes that her husband is scared of giving birth and they make up before going to Papa & Kids as a family.

Kentaro eventually goes into labor, though oddly enough he is not shown in pain, and meets with Aki at the hospital. He successfully gives birth to a baby boy and names him Kotaro. Kentaro begins taking Kotaro to work where Aki dotes over him and he reunites with Mizuki who has also given birth and started a baby carriage business with a friend. Despite having had the baby, Kentaro still suspects that there is some prejudice and realizes that he has more to do. In the future, Kotaro is pregnant with his wife's baby and Kentaro and Aki visit where they happily congratulate them.

In a bonus chapter, Aki has decided to write a book about male pregnancy and interviews the leads from the previous chapters. During this time, she had not come out publicly about being the mother of Kotaro. In the end, she realizes that Kentaro cannot raise him on his own and tells him that she will always be there for him.

==== Kentaro Hiyama's First Pregnancy: Childcare Edition ====
Three years after Kotaro's birth, Kentaro and Aki are trying to balance their work and personal lives, but slowly begin to consider moving in with one another to make things easier. Despite this, Aki does not want to give up her freedom and Kentaro wants to respect her boundaries. Meanwhile, Seiya Aoyagi, member of the boy band Girl Meets Boy, learns that he is pregnant, the mother being Asakawa Sakura, a member of OTW49. Seiya wants to keep the baby, though he feels pressured to keep it secret while Asakawa wants him to abort the child for fear of it damaging both their careers. Seiya seeks the aid of Kentaro after learning of his similar past and ask that he manage his public image, much to his confusion. When Seiya tells Asakawa that he plans to keep the baby, she plans on leaving him, but is caught in a situation with Kentaro, making it look like that the two are secretly lovers. Aki later meets with Asakawa to convince her to rethink her stance. Seiya decides to go public with his pregnancy which gets a mixed, yet mostly positive response. Asakawa begins to slowly regret her past belief, especially when she realizes how much she loves him.

Kentaro later meets with Makoto Hatano, an employee who reveals that she has been seeing her direct supervisor Hiromi Shimomura, who is married, and that she may have gotten him pregnant. When Kentaro and Makoto confront him on it, he angrily denies that he is. When Hiromi continues to deny it, Makoto tells him that she has decided to leave him and let him have the baby by himself. Hiromi soon accepts that he is pregnant, but hides it from his family and disappears.

A subplot revolves around Kentaro trying to maintain his daycare center which is slowly going out of business due to the number of male pregnancies decreasing. While he ends up shutting it down, he starts to rethink the concept. Later, Kentaro and Aki soon admit that they love one another and decide to formally move in and possibly have another baby together.

Eventually, Asakawa accepts both Seiya and the baby at the cost of both leaving their respective bands. Seiya gives birth with both bands there to support him and he has a boy whom he names Ataru. Hiromi's wife, Yuiko, finds out about his pregnancy and affair. She initially demand that he abort it, but they end up divorcing and he gives birth alone after realizing that he loves his daughters. Makoto decides that she does not want to see her child as punishment for both herself and Hiromi. Hiromi later apologizes to Kentaro for not supporting his daycare center idea earlier. Seiya gets a new job for a magazine for young parents and Asakawa goes into acting.

During Kotaro's fourth birthday, Kentaro suddenly feels sick and believes he might be pregnant again, shocking him as he was hoping Aki would get pregnant this time. She scolds him for this, but nevertheless the two are happy at the prospect of having another child. The follow up heavily implies that he isn't however.

==== Kentaro Hiyama's First Pregnancy: Separate Volume ====
Taking place sometime after Childcare Edition, Kentaro and Aki befriend an up-and-coming politician named Shimadzu Hajime who suddenly becomes pregnant. When the liberal party that he was to run with suddenly drop him, he gets the aid of his wife, Kentaro, Aki, Seiya and Tsubasa to run independently and send a positive message of speaking up. A year after the election, it is revealed that Hajime lost, but is happily raising his child with his wife, while public opinion of male pregnancy has turned for the better. Kentaro and Aki continue their happy family life with Kotaro.

== Characters ==
Kentaro Hiyama (檜山健太郎, Hiyama Kentarō)
A 32-year-old single elite salaryman who becomes pregnant from his frequent tryst with Aki Seto. He was initially unsure if he wanted to keep the baby, but embraces fatherhood after experiencing workplace prejudice first hand. He constructs a restaurant called "Papa & Kids" for those who are nursing or expecting. Kentaro has a sense of entitlement and pride following his insemination as his father died prior to his own birth and his mother struggled to raise him on her own. He had no interest in co-parenting the baby with Aki until she openly suggested taking care of him while he was at work. He gives birth to a boy, whom he names Kotaro, and happily raises him. In the initial series, Kentaro and Aki keep their relationship platonic while raising Kotaro, but in Childcare Edition, they end up becoming closer and choose to move in with each other.
Aki Seto (瀬戸亜希, Seto Aki)
A 30-year-old freelance journalist and the mother of Kentaro Hiyama's baby. She was staunchly against settling down and having kids until Kentaro revealed his pregnancy to her. While initially unsure if she was actually the mother (he admitted to having other relationships) Aki develops maternal longing for a child and offers to co-parent the baby while he is at work. In the initial series, Aki maintains a platonic relationship with Kentaro while raising their son Kotaro, but in Childcare Edition this is retconned with the two of them developing genuine feelings for each other.
Kotaro Hiyama (檜山幸太郎, Hiyama Kōtarō)
Kentaro and Aki's son who becomes the center of their world. He is born at the end of the initial series and in the future marries a woman named Aoi and becomes pregnant with their baby. In Childcare Edition, which takes place three years after, Kotaro becomes something of the source of conflict for Kentaro and Aki as they try to make their lives easier for him and themselves.
Mizuki Kawabata (川端美月, Kawabata Mizuki)
An office worker who becomes pregnant from her duplicitous boyfriend. She struggles with the idea of having someone to rely on with a baby on the way. Upon learning that Kentaro is pregnant and single, she is inspired to raise her baby on her own. She eventually gives birth and starts a baby carriage rental business with a friend. It is implied that she is the mother of Aoi, Kotaro's future wife. She is completely absent in Childcare Edition.
Seiya Aoyagi (青柳誠也, Aoyagi Seiya)
A popular idol of mixed Eurasian descent who is part of a boyband called Girl Meets Boy. He becomes pregnant from his relationship with fellow idol Asakawa Sakura. Inspired by Kentaro's story, he decides to keep his baby and hires him to act as an advisor of sorts to help handle paparazzi.
Asakawa Sakura (浅川さくら, Sakura Asakawa)
A famous singer who acquired the lead of the girl group OTW49. She is the mother of Seiya Aoyagi's baby and is initially dismissive of the news in the hopes of raising her stardom. She slowly begins to embrace the idea of being a mother.
Hajime Shimadzu (島津はじめ, Shimadzu Hajime)
A young politician who becomes pregnant and tries to increase male pregnancy awareness.
