= The Heart of Thomas =

Japanese manga series by Moto Hagio

- The cover of the second volume, featuring Erich (left), Oskar (center), and Juli (right)

トーマの心臓 (Tōma no Shinzō)
- Genre: Bildungsroman; Shōnen-ai
- Created by: Moto Hagio
- Manga
- Written by: Moto Hagio
- Published by: Shogakukan
- English publisher: NA: Fantagraphics Books
- Imprint: Flower Comics
- Magazine: Shūkan Shōjo Comic
- Original run: May 5, 1974 – December 22, 1974
- Volumes: 3 (1 in North America)
- Sequels & related works
- The November Gymnasium (1971); By the Lake (1976); The Visitor (1980)
- Adaptations
- Summer Vacation 1999 (film, 1988); The Heart of Thomas (stage play, 1996); Lost Heart for Thoma (novel, 2009)

The Heart of Thomas (Japanese: トーマの心臓, Hepburn: Tōma no Shinzō) is a 1974 Japanese manga series written and illustrated by Moto Hagio. Originally serialized in Shūkan Shōjo Comic, a weekly manga magazine publishing shōjo manga (manga aimed at young and adolescent women), the series follows the events at a German all-boys gymnasium following the suicide of student Thomas Werner. Hagio drew inspiration for the series from the novels of Hermann Hesse, especially Demian (1919); the Bildungsroman genre; and the 1964 film Les amitiés particulières. It is one of the earliest works of shōnen-ai, a genre of male-male romance manga aimed at a female audience.

The Heart of Thomas was developed and published during a period of immense change and upheaval for shōjo manga as a medium, characterized by the emergence of new aesthetic styles and more narratively complex stories. This change came to be embodied by a new generation of shōjo manga artists collectively referred to as the Year 24 Group, of which Hagio was a member. Hagio originally developed the series as a personal project that she did not expect would ever be published. After changing publishing houses from Kodansha to Shogakukan in 1971, Hagio published a loosely-adapted one-shot (standalone single chapter) version of The Heart of Thomas titled The November Gymnasium (11月のギムナジウム, Jūichigatsu no Gimunajiumu) before publishing the full series in 1974.

While The Heart of Thomas was initially poorly received by readers, by the end of its serialization it was among the most popular series in Shūkan Shōjo Comic. It significantly influenced shōjo manga as a medium, with many of the stylistic and narrative hallmarks of the series becoming standard tropes of the genre. The series has attracted considerable scholarly interest both in Japan and internationally, and has been adapted into a film, a stage play, and a novel. An English-language translation of The Heart of Thomas, translated by Rachel Thorn, was published by Fantagraphics Books in 2013.

== Synopsis ==
The series is set in the mid-20th century, primarily at the fictional Schlotterbach Gymnasium in the Karlsruhe region of Germany, located on the Rhine between the cities of Karlsruhe and Heidelberg.

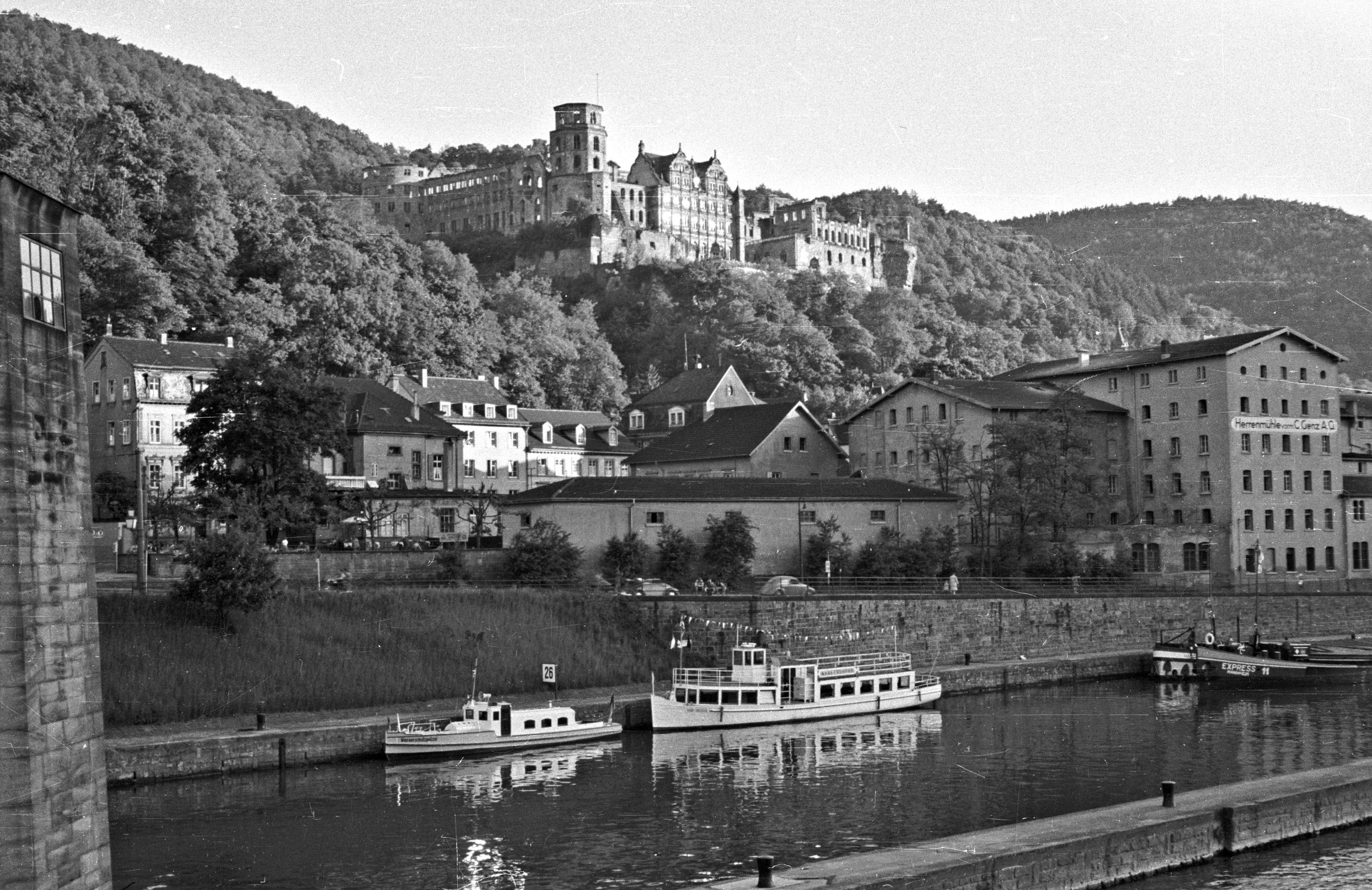
Heidelberg in the 1950s, which is visited by Oskar and Erik

During Easter holidays, Schlotterbach student Thomas Werner dies after falling off a pedestrian footbridge spanning a railroad track. Although the school's community believes his death to be accidental, his classmate Julusmole "Juli" Bauernfeind receives a posthumous suicide letter from Thomas wherein Thomas professes his love for him; Thomas had unrequited romantic feelings for Juli, who had previously rejected his affections. Though Juli is outwardly unmoved by the incident, he is privately racked with guilt over Thomas' death. He confides in his roommate Oskar Reiser, who is also secretly in love with Juli.

Erich Frühling, a new student who bears a very close physical resemblance to Thomas, arrives at Schlotterbach shortly thereafter. Erich is irascible and blunt, and resents frequent comparisons to the kind and genteel Thomas. Juli believes that Erich is Thomas' malevolent doppelgänger who has come to Schlotterbach to torment him, and tells Erich that he intends to kill him. Oskar attempts to de-escalate the situation, and befriends Erich. They bond over their troubled family contexts: Erich harbors an unresolved Oedipus complex towards his recently deceased mother, while Oskar's mother was murdered by her husband after he discovered Oskar was the product of an extramarital affair.

It is gradually revealed that the root of Juli's anguish was his attraction to both Thomas and Siegfried Gast, the latter of whom was a delinquent student at the school. Juli chose to pursue Siegfried over Thomas, but Siegfried physically abused Juli by caning his back and burning his chest with a cigarette to the point of scarring, and is implied to have raped him. The incident traumatized Juli; likening himself to a fallen angel who has lost his "wings", Juli came to believe he was unworthy of being loved, which prompted his initial rejection of Thomas. Juli, Oskar, and Erich ultimately resolve their traumas and form mutual friendships. Having made peace with his past, Juli accepts the late Thomas' love, and departs Schlotterbach to join a seminary in Bonn, so he may be closer to Thomas through God.

== Characters ==
=== Primary characters ===
Thomas Werner (トーマ・ヴェルナー, Tōma Verunā)
A thirteen-year-old student at Schlotterbach, beloved by his peers, who refer to him by the nickname "Fräulein". He harbors romantic feelings for Juli, but upon declaring his love for him, is rejected. His suicide, ostensibly motivated by this rejection, serves as the inciting incident for the plot of the series.
Julusmole Bauernfeind (ユリスモール・バイハン, Yurisumōru Baihan)
A fourteen-year-old student at Schlotterbach, nicknamed Juli (ユーリ, Yūri). The son of a German mother and a Greek father, he faces discrimination from his maternal grandmother as a result of his mixed heritage. Thus, he strives to be a perfect student so that he can one day be someone worth admiring regardless of his physical characteristics: he is the top pupil at Schlotterbach, a prefect, and the student head of the school library. The abuse he suffered at the hands of Siegfried led him to believe that he is unworthy of love, and to reject Thomas's romantic advances.
Oskar Reiser (オスカー・ライザー, Osukā Raizā)
Juli's fifteen-year-old roommate. He is the illegitimate child of his mother Helene and Schlotterbach headmaster Müller; when Helene's husband Gustav discovered that Oskar was not his child, he shot and killed her. Gustav pretended the death was an accident and abandoned Oskar at Schlotterbach to be cared for by the headmaster. Oskar is aware of the truth of his parentage, but does not admit so openly, and dreams of one day being adopted by Müller. Though Oskar behaves like a delinquent, he possesses a strong sense of responsibility for others: he is one of the few who knows about Juli's past, and becomes one of the first students to befriend Erich. Oskar is in love with Juli, but he rarely admits so and never pushes himself on him.
Erich Frühling (エーリク・フリューリンク, Ēriku Furyūrinku)
A fourteen-year-old student from Cologne who arrives at Schlotterbach shortly after Thomas' death, and who strongly resembles Thomas. Irascible, blunt, and spoiled, he suffers from neurosis and fainting spells caused by an unresolved Oedipus complex: he deeply loves his mother Marie, who dies in a car accident shortly after his arrival at Schlotterbach. During this time, Juli comforts him and the two become close; Erich eventually falls in love with Juli, and pursues him even as Juli rebuffs him out of guilt for Thomas. By the end of the series, Erich and Juli make peace.

=== Secondary characters ===
Ante Löwer (アンテ・ローエ, Ante Rōhe)
A thirteen-year-old student at Schlotterbach who is in love with Oskar, and harbors jealousy towards Juli as the target of Oskar's affections. He made a bet with Thomas to seduce Juli in hopes of distancing Oskar and Juli; unaware of Thomas' genuine feelings for Juli, he blamed himself when the bet backfired and Thomas killed himself as a result of Juli's rejection. Ante is calculated and spiteful, but eventually matures and admits to the consequences of his actions.
Siegfried Gast (サイフリート・ガスト, Seifuriito Gasuto)
A former student at Schlotterbach. He is renowned for his intelligence, delinquency, and debauchery, and proclaims himself to be greater than God. Prior to the events of the series, Juli found himself attracted to Siegfried against his better judgement, leading to an incident wherein he was abused and tortured by Siegfried and several other upperclassmen. Siegfried and the upperclassmen were expelled from Schlotterbach as a result.
Julius Sidney Schwarz (ユーリ・シド・シュヴァルツ, Yūri Shido Shuvarutsu)
The lover of Erich's mother Marie at the time of her death; a car accident in Paris kills Marie and causes Julius to lose one of his legs. He visits Erich and offers to adopt him, to which Erich consents.
Gustav Reiser (グスターフ・ライザー, Gusutāfu Raizā)
Oskar's legal father. Upon learning that Oskar is not his biological child, he murdered his wife and sent Oskar to Schlotterbach before fleeing to South America.
Müller (ミュラー, Myurā)
The headmaster of Schlotterbach. A former friend of Gustav's, and Oskar's biological father.

== Development ==
=== Context ===
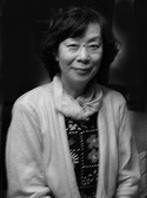
Hagio in 2008

Moto Hagio made her debut as manga artist in the monthly manga magazine Nakayoshi in 1969 with a comical story, Ruru to Mimi (ルルとミミ; "Lulu and Mimi"). Shōjo manga (comics for girls) of this era were typically sentimental or humorous in tone, marketed towards elementary school-aged girls, and were often centered on familial drama or romantic comedy. As Hagio's artistic and narrative style deviated from typical the shōjo manga of the 1960s, her next four submissions to Nakayoshi were rejected. Hagio's debut as a manga artist occurred contemporaneously with a period of immense change and upheaval for shōjo manga as a medium: the 1960s saw the emergence of new aesthetic styles that differentiated shōjo manga from shōnen manga (comics for boys), while the 1970s saw the proliferation of more narratively complex stories that focused on social issues and sexuality.

This change came to be embodied by a new generation of shōjo manga artists collectively referred to as the Year 24 Group, of which Hagio was a member; the group was so named because its members were born in or around year 24 of the Shōwa era (or 1949 in the Gregorian calendar). The group contributed significantly to the development of shōjo manga by expanding the genre to incorporate elements of science fiction, historical fiction, adventure fiction, and same-sex romance: both male-male (shōnen-ai and yaoi) and female-female (yuri). Two particular works created by members of the Year 24 Group influenced the development of The Heart of Thomas. The first was In the Sunroom by Keiko Takemiya, which would become the first manga in the shōnen-ai genre and was noted for having male protagonists, an uncommon practice for shōjo manga at the time. The second was The Rose of Versailles by Riyoko Ikeda, which began serialization in the manga magazine Margaret in May 1972; the series became the first major commercial success in the shōjo genre, and proved the genre's viability as a commercial category. Hagio herself began publishing The Poe Clan in March 1972 in Bessatsu Shōjo Comic; the series was not strictly a serial, but rather a series of interrelated narratives featuring recurring characters which functioned as standalone stories.

=== Production ===
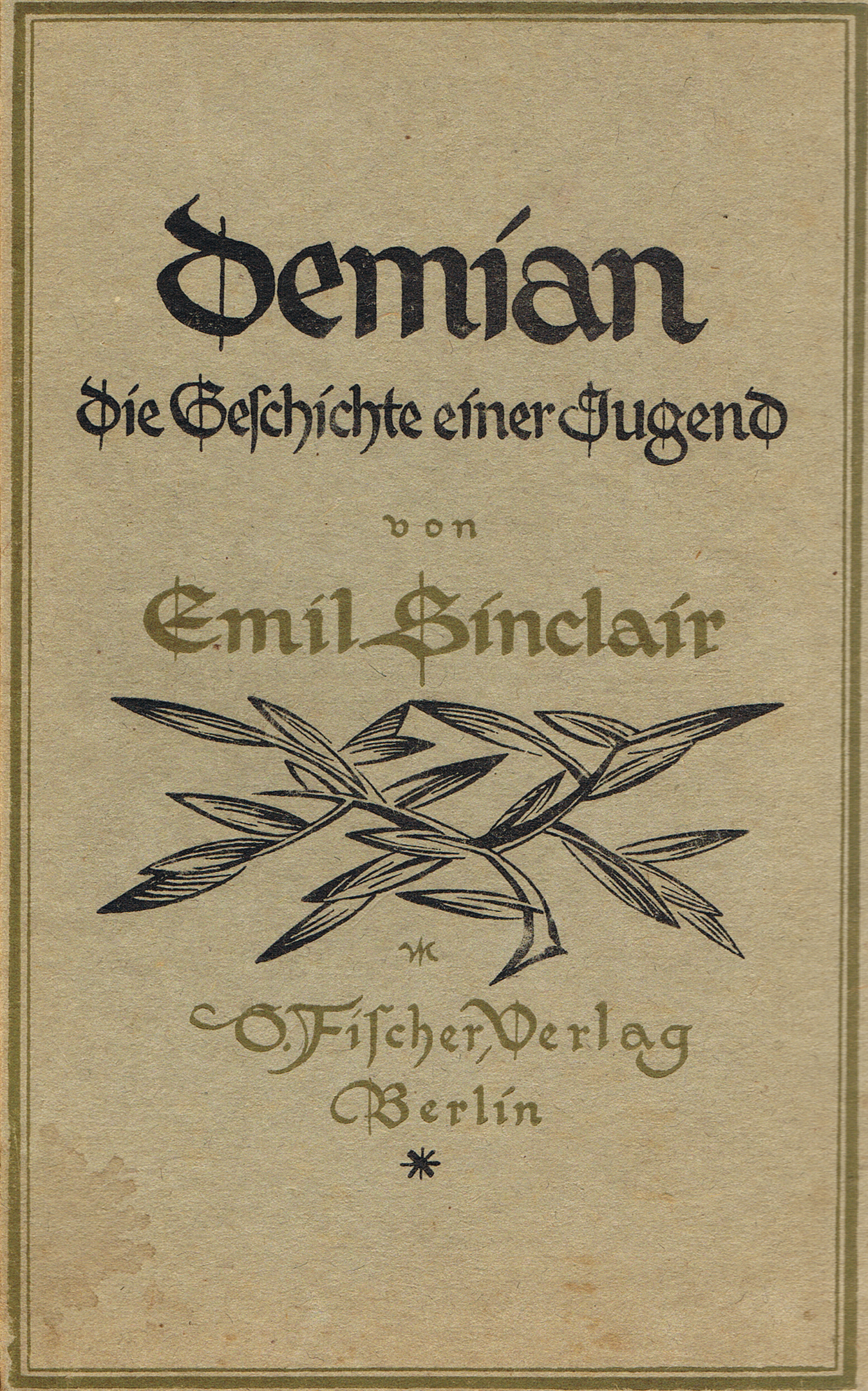
Demian by Hermann Hesse was a major influence on The Heart of Thomas.

In 1970, Hagio befriended Norie Masuyama and manga artist Keiko Takemiya. Masuyama is credited with introducing Hagio and Takemiya to literature, music, and films that would come to heavily influence their manga: Demian, Beneath the Wheel, and Narcissus and Goldmund by Hermann Hesse, as well as other novels in the Bildungsroman genre recommended by Masuyama, came to influence Hagio generally and The Heart of Thomas specifically. Hagio has stated that Hesse's works "opened up one by one the dams that had stopped up the water [...] I heard a voice saying 'yes, you can write. Yes, you can express yourself the way you like. Yes, you can exist.'" That same year, Hagio and Takemiya watched the 1964 Jean Delannoy film Les amitiés particulières, which depicts a tragic romance between two boys in a French boarding school. The film inspired Takemiya to create In the Sunroom, while Hagio began to create The Heart of Thomas as a personal project that she did not expect would ever be published.

In 1971, Hagio changed publishing houses from Kodansha to Shogakukan, granting her greater editorial freedom and leading her to publish a loosely-adapted one-shot version of The Heart of Thomas titled The November Gymnasium. An early draft of The November Gymnasium relocated the setting of the story from an all-boys school to an all-girls school; unsatisfied with the resulting story, she maintained the male protagonists of the original series and published the adaptation in Bessatsu Shōjo Comic in November 1971. The November Gymnasium depicts a love story between Erich and Thomas, and ends with the latter's death; Oskar also appears, having previously appeared in Hagio's Hanayome wo Hirotta Otoko (花嫁をひろった男) in April 1971, and who would later appear in Sangatsu Usagi ga Shūdan de (3月ウサギが集団で) in April 1972 and Minna de Ocha o (みんなでお茶を) in April 1974.

=== Release ===
Following the critical and commercial success of The Rose of Versailles at rival publisher Shueisha, Shūkan Shōjo Comic editor Junya Yamamoto asked Hagio to create a series of similar length and complexity, initially planned to be serialized over the course of two to three years. Having already drawn roughly 200 pages of The Heart of Thomas, Hagio submitted the series; the first chapter was published in the magazine on May 5, 1974. Three weeks into its serialization, a reader survey found that The Heart of Thomas was the least-popular series in Shūkan Shōjo Comic, prompting editors at the magazine to request that Hagio amend the original two- to three-year timeline for the series to four to five weeks. Hagio negotiated to allow serialization of The Heart of Thomas to continue for an additional month, stating that if the reception was still poor after that time, she would finish the story prematurely. She issued a direct appeal to Shūkan Shōjo Comic's readers, writing in the magazine that The Heart of Thomas was facing cancellation due to its poor survey placement, and launched a sweepstakes in which a random respondent to the magazine's reader survey would receive a piece of original cover artwork from the series.

In June 1974, the first tankōbon (collected edition) of Hagio's The Poe Clan was published: it sold out its initial print run of 30,000 copies in three days, an unprecedented sales volume at the time for a shōjo manga series that had not been adapted into an anime. Shogakukan encouraged Hagio to conclude The Heart of Thomas to focus on The Poe Clan, though Hagio insisted on continuing the series. The success of The Poe Clan drew attention to The Heart of Thomas, and by the end of the summer, The Heart of Thomas was ranked as the fifth most popular serialization in Shūkan Shōjo Comic. Assisted by Yukiko Kai, Hagio continued serialization of The Heart of Thomas. The series concluded on December 22, 1974, with 33 weekly chapters published in Shūkan Shōjo Comic. At the time, original manga artwork did not necessarily remain the property of the artist; in the case of The Heart of Thomas, the original artwork for the frontispiece of each chapter were distributed as rewards for a contest in the magazine. In 2019, Shogakukan launched a campaign through its magazine Monthly Flowers to recover the original frontispieces for The Heart of Thomas.

Upon its conclusion, Shogakukan collected The Heart of Thomas into three tankōbon published in January, April, and June 1975; they are respectively numbers 41, 42, and 43 of the Flower Comics collection. The series has been regularly re-printed by Shogakukan. In the West, The Heart of Thomas was not published until the 2010s. On September 14, 2011, Fantagraphics Books announced that it had acquired the license to The Heart of Thomas for release in North America. The single-volume hardcover omnibus, translated into English by Rachel Thorn, was released on January 18, 2013.

== Sequels ==
By the Lake: The Summer of Fourteen-and-a-Half-Year-Old Erich (湖畔にて – エーリク十四と半分の年の夏, Kohan nite – Ēriku Jūyon to Hanbun no Toshi no Natsu) is a one-shot sequel to The Heart of Thomas. The story follows Erich as he vacations on Lake Constance with Julius, who is now his adopted father; he later receives a letter from Juli, and is visited by Oskar. The manga was written and illustrated by Hagio, and published in 1976 in the illustration and poetry book Strawberry Fields (ストロベリー・フィールズ, Sutoroberī Fīruzu) published by Shinshokan.

The Visitor (訪問者, Hōmonsha) is a one-shot prequel to The Heart of Thomas. The story focuses on Oskar: first while he is on vacation with Gustav prior to arriving at Schlotterbach, and later when he meets Juli for the first time. The manga was written and illustrated by Hagio, and published in the spring 1980 issue of Petit Flower.

== Analysis and themes ==
=== Visual style ===
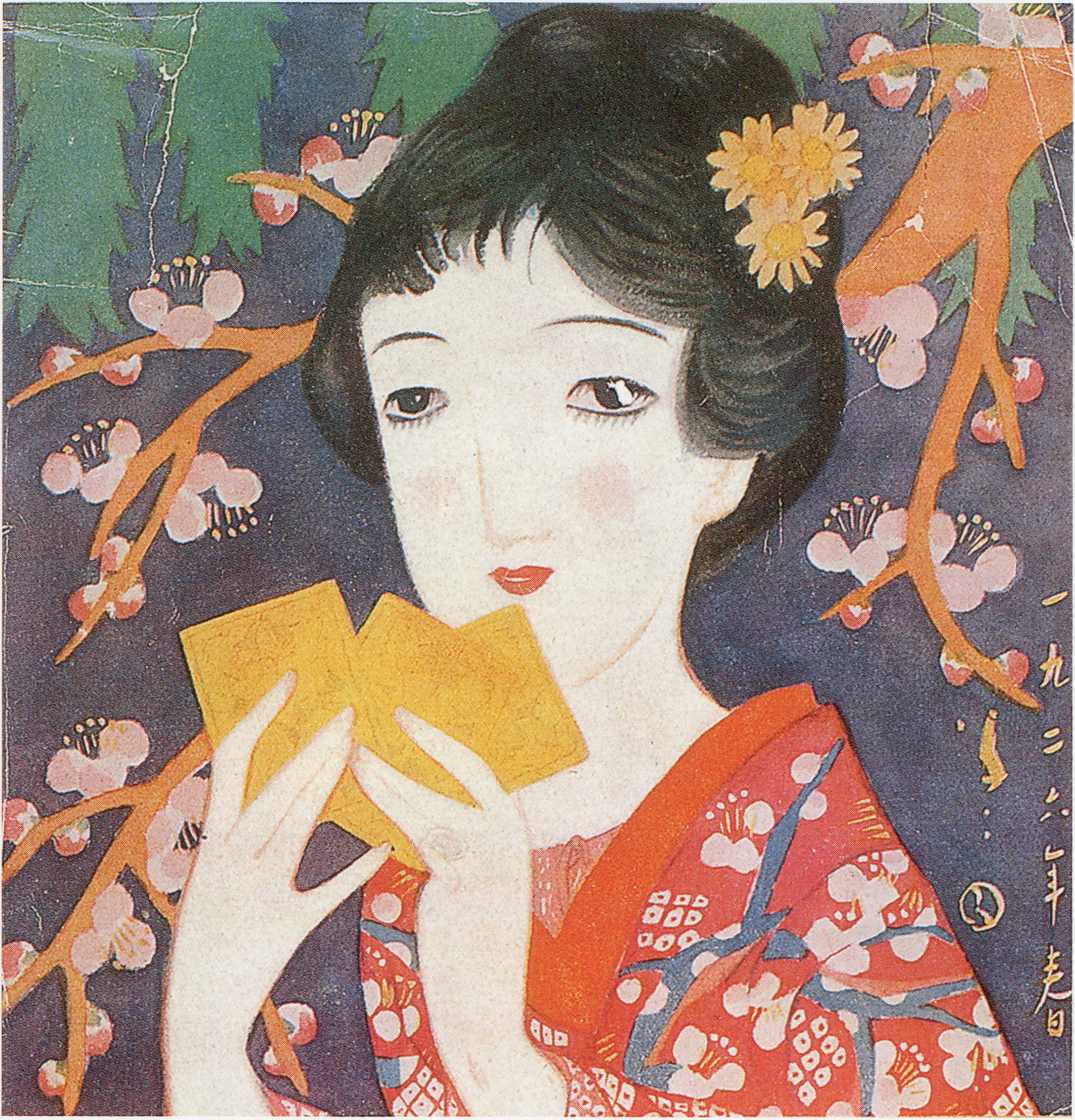
Jojōga (lyrical pictures), as in this illustration by Yumeji Takehisa, influenced the visual style of The Heart of Thomas.

In The Heart of Thomas, Hagio develops important aspects of the principles of visual composition that have come to define the distinctive aesthetic of shōjo manga. While these principles are not the work of Hagio alone, and instead took shape by degrees through the contributions of many artists beginning in the 1950s, Hagio develops this aesthetic in part by borrowing features from illustrations in pre-World War II Japanese girls' magazines. She references jojōga (lyrical pictures) in particular, a category of illustration which sought to create a mood of sad longing while also scrupulously depicting current trends in fashion. Both jojōga and these shōjo visual principles are directed towards a girls' culture, and seek to heighten an emotional response.

Seen significantly in The Heart of Thomas, these principles include characters externalizing their thoughts by associating freely or by doing so deliberately in a commentary; comic panels without borders; scenes displayed in slanting frames that overlap; visual metaphor; and backgrounds that arouse strong emotion. For example, facial features in manga are not typically drawn to scale, with younger and female characters drawn with more rounded cheeks and eyes relative to older and male characters; the principal characters of The Heart of Thomas often have oversized and sparkling eyes, and wear attire that obscures their body contours. Kathryn Hemmann, a scholar of Japanese fiction and graphic novels, interprets these visual metaphors to communicate the defenseless and guileless natures of the characters, and their pursuit of love unencumbered by sexuality. Folklorist Kanako Shiokawa comments on the use of emotive backgrounds as influencing the shōjo artistic convention of illustrations where blossoming flowers are crowded behind the large-eyed characters.

Deborah Shamoon, a scholar of manga and animation, downplays the focus on character and background design to consider the primacy of interior monologues in The Heart of Thomas, which are disconnected from speech balloons. The monologues are fragmented and scattered across the page, which Shamoon compares to poetry and the writing style of Nobuko Yoshiya, and accompanied by images, motifs, and backgrounds that often extend beyond the edges of panels or overlap to form new compositions. Shamoon describes these compositions as "melodramatic stasis" – the action stops so that the monologue and images can communicate the inner pathos of the characters. She argues that these techniques create a three-dimensional effect that "lends both literal and symbolic depth to the story." Bill Randall of The Comics Journal considers how these moments allow the reader to directly access the emotions of the characters, "encouraging not a distanced consideration of the emotion, but a willing acceptance" of them.

=== Gender ===
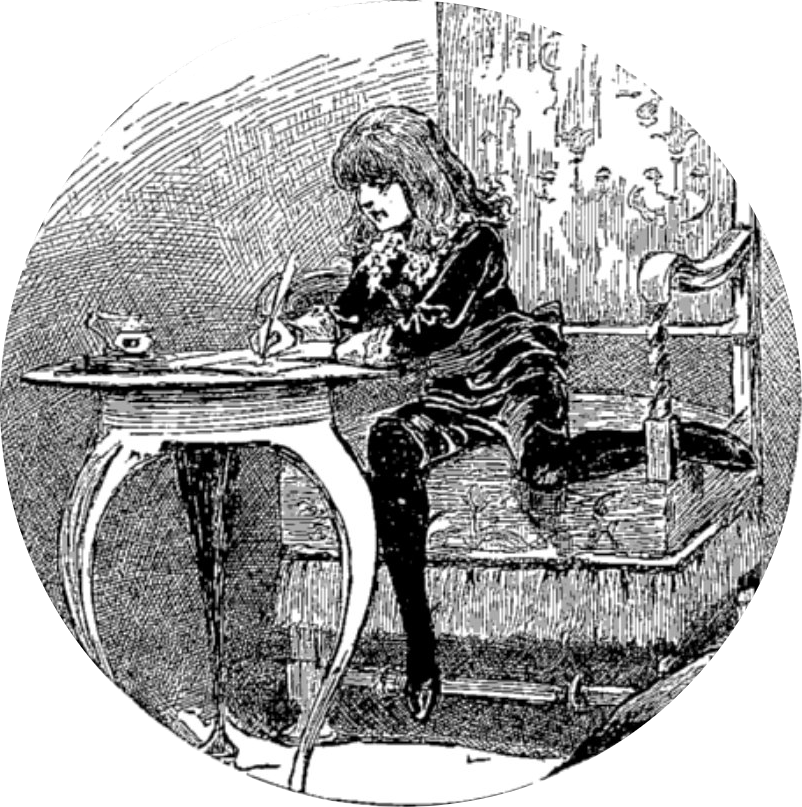
The androgynous appearance of the boys of The Heart of Thomas has been compared to the titular character of Little Lord Fauntleroy.

The primary male characters of The Heart of Thomas are drawn with facial features typical of female characters, their maleness marked visually only in their shorter hair and boys' school uniforms. This artistic device led the poet Takaaki Yoshimoto to remark to Hagio that despite her characters being male, they appeared female to him. Hagio had set an early draft of The November Gymnasium in an all-girls school, but ultimately published the series with the original all-boys setting of The Heart of Thomas, explaining later, "Boys in shōjo manga are at their origin girls, girls wishing to become boys and, if they were boys, wanting to do this or do that. Being a boy is what the girls admire."

Echoing Hagio, art critic Midori Matsui describes the boys of The Heart of Thomas as displaced versions of girls who are granted the ability to express their thoughts fluently and their desires uninhibitedly, counterbalancing the absence of these attributes in the conventional depictions of girls in shōjo manga. Matsui considers that this representation appeals to Japanese adolescent female readers by harking back to a sexually undifferentiated state of childhood, while also allowing them to vicariously contemplate the sexual attractiveness of males. Graphic designer and manga scholar Kaoru Tamura compares the androgynous appearance of the boys of The Heart of Thomas to the titular character of Little Lord Fauntleroy by Frances Hodgson Burnett, which was translated into Japanese by Wakamatsu Shizuko.

A notable exception to this artistic convention of depicting male characters with female attributes is Siegfried, who is drawn as masculine – taller, with hollow cheeks and oval eyes – even though his hair is unusually long. According to Nobuko Anan, a scholar of Japanese visual arts and gender, Siegfried's physical appearance renders him "as the Other, or a 'man,' in this space of 'girls.'" Anan considers Siegfried's abuse of Juli to signify the rape of a woman by a man, and compares Juli's ability to overcome this trauma through his friendship with Oskar and Erich to women who overcome the trauma of rape with the support of other women. Japanese studies scholar Kathryn Hemman considers The Heart of Thomas to constitute an allegory for the protection offered to young women by traditional gender roles in the 1970s and the loss of identity that comes with the assumption of these roles, noting that Juli, Oskar, and Erich eventually relinquish gender amorphousness to assume more traditionally masculine rules.

James Welker considers depictions of gender and sexuality in The Heart of Thomas to be underlain by "lesbian panic," or the inability or unwillingness to face lesbian desire. He cites as evidence Juli's confused reaction to Thomas's suicide note; Juli's extreme response to the presence of Thomas's look-alike Erich; and the early all-girls version of The November Gymnasium, which Hagio discarded and later described as iyarashii (嫌らしい; "disgusting"). Welker interprets Hagio's usage of iyarashii as reflective of her anxiety about lesbian love. Mark McLelland, sociologist and cultural historian of Japan at the University of Wollongong, believed that Hagio depicted the primary characters of The November Gymnasium and The Heart of Thomas as male to free her readers from the same anxiety. Deborah Shamoon posits that Hagio may have been referring to the Class S literary genre that depicts intimate relations between females, and that iyarashii might have been in reference to the old-fashioned and rigid conventions of that genre.

=== Religion and spiritual love ===
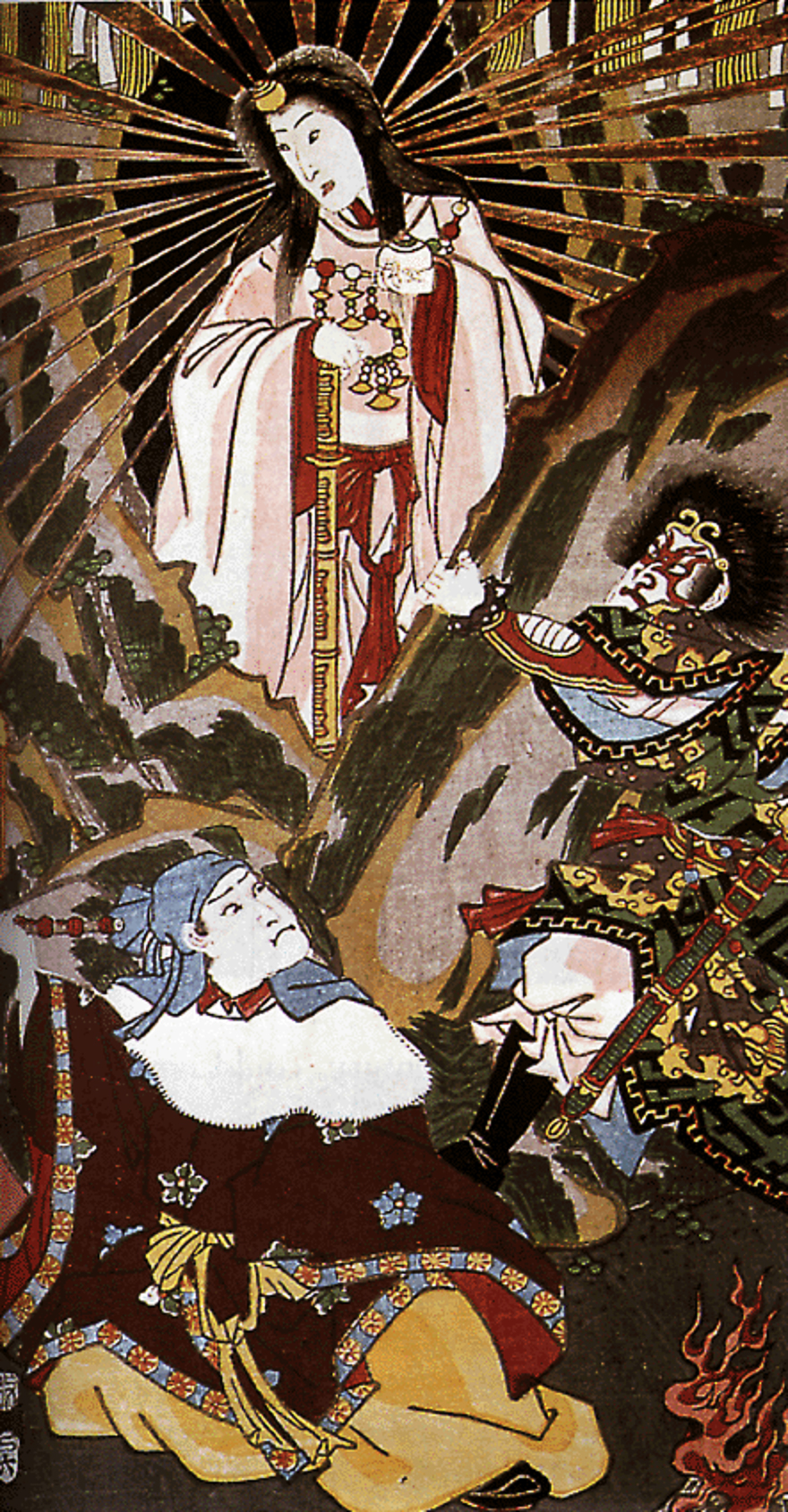
The Shinto deity Amaterasu. Hagio presents Christian concepts in The Heart of Thomas in a manner that suggests inspiration from religious traditions of Japan.

Deborah Shamoon notes that although the gymnasium surroundings of The Heart of Thomas are represented with realism, the imaginative use of ghosts, angels, Biblical legends, and apparitions evokes a Gothic atmosphere. Supernatural objects and themes, in her view, represent not only the inner conflicts created by spiritual love but also reveal it as a force beyond ordinary rational understanding. Figures from the Old Testament and Greek mythology appear as symbolic representations: Juli is drawn as the angel Gabriel when he reveals to Erich his history of abuse, angels appear throughout the series to symbolize the thoughts of characters, and the eighth chapter frontispiece personifies the Moirai as a young girl holding a spool of yarn. Tamura notes that Hagio, who is not Christian, presents Christian concepts in a manner that suggests inspiration from the animistic and polytheistic religious traditions of Japan. For example, Oskar remarks to Erich that Thomas was possessed by Amor, the Roman god of love, and that his suicide released the spirit. Although Amor is often depicted as an angel in Western art, Tamura notes that Hagio manifests Amor in a manner that is reminiscent of a Japanese kami (spirit), such as inhabiting the air, a landscape, or a character in the story.

Like Hesse's Demian, The Heart of Thomas is a Bildungsroman about spiritual education during formative years. Welker writes that Juli's character arc of being unable to love, befriending Erich, and leaving the school environment of Schlotterbach is one that is consistent with a "Bildungsroman paradigm." Shamoon notes that unlike other manga works of the 1970s that feature male-male romance, The Heart of Thomas does not overtly depict sex; she argues that by depicting its characters maturing through spiritual and familial love rather than romantic and sexual love, The Heart of Thomas functions as a "transitional work" between "childish" shōjo narratives typical of the 1970s and earlier (such as Paris–Tokyo by Macoto Takahashi and Candy Candy by Kyoko Mizuki and Yumiko Igarashi, the latter of which Shamoon notes depicts "idealized romantic love in a heterosexual framework"), and shōjo manga from the mid-1970s and onward that targeted an older readership. Thorn similarly contrasts the focus on spiritual love in The Heart of Thomas to Kaze to Ki no Uta and the works of Keiko Takemiya, which focus primarily on physical love.

In further similarity to Demian, The Heart of Thomas explores the concept of rebirth through destruction, though The Heart of Thomas reverses Demian's chronology: while Demian concludes with its protagonist's epiphany, The Heart of Thomas begins with Thomas' epiphany, which leads to his suicide. Thorn notes this reversal with regards to the influence of the film Les amitiés particulières, which also inspired the manga: while Les amitiés particulières concludes with a suicide, "the cause of which is obvious, Hagio begins with a suicide, the cause of which is a mystery." Commenting on the unresolved nature of Thomas' suicide in a 2005 interview with The Comics Journal, Hagio stated:

If I had written [The Heart of Thomas] after the age of thirty, I probably would have worked out some logical reason for [Thomas] to die, but at the time I thought, 'He doesn't need a reason to die.' [Laughs.] I could have said that he died because he was sick and didn't have long to live anyway, or something like that. At the time, I thought, how one lives is important, but how one dies might be important, too, and so that's how I wrote it. In a sense, that mystery of why he had to die is never solved, and I think that unsolved mystery is what sustains the work.

Manga critic Aniwa Jun interprets Thomas' suicide not as a selfish act motivated by Juli's rejection, but as a "longing for super power, yearning for eternity, an affirmation and sublimation of life to a sacred level." Shamoon concurs that Thomas' death is "not so much as an act of despair over his unrequited love for Juli, but as a sacrifice to free Juli's repressed emotions." She argues that Juli as a character "represents the triumph of spiritual love over the traumas of adolescence and specifically the threat of sexual violence," and that his decision to join a seminary at the conclusion of the series represents his acceptance of "spiritual love (ren'ai) at its most pure [...] a transcendent, divine experience, separated from physical desires."

== Reception and legacy ==
The Heart of Thomas is considered a seminal work of both shōnen-ai and shōjo manga, and came to strongly influence shōjo manga works that followed it. Randall notes how many of the stylistic hallmarks of the series, such as characters depicted with angel's wings or surrounded by flower petals, became standard visual tropes in the shōjo genre. Shamoon argues that the use of interior monologue in The Heart of Thomas, which was later adapted by other series in shōjo genre, became the main marker distinguishing shōjo manga from other types of manga. Thorn notes that the themes and characters of The Heart of Thomas are also present in Hagio's 1992 manga series A Cruel God Reigns, describing the series as "the adult version" of The Heart of Thomas.

In reviews of The Heart of Thomas in the mainstream and enthusiast English-language press, critics have praised the series' artwork, narrative, and writing. Writing for Anime News Network, Jason Thompson praises its "'70s shojo artwork", along with the "dreamlike sense of unreality" in Hagio's dialogue. In a separate review for Anime News Network, Rebecca Silverman similarly praises the "willowy" and dramatic 1970s-style artwork, particularly Hagio's use of collage imagery, Writing for ComicsAlliance, David Brothers favorably compares the melodrama of the series to Chris Claremont's Uncanny X-Men and commends its character-driven drama. Publishers Weekly described the series' romance elements as "engaging but nearly ritualized," but praised Hagio's "clear art style and her internally dark tone."

Among Japanese critics, literary critic Osamu Hashimoto was among The Heart of Thomas' earliest detractors, describing the series as a "failed [boys'] Bildungsroman." In a responding review in her 1984 book Chōshōjo, literary critic Chizuru Miyasako contended that The Heart of Thomas is not a boys' Bildungsroman but rather a work in which boys are written as allegorical girls (see Gender above); she praises the series as an example of "anti-shōjo" that seeks to offer commentary on the lives of girls in patriarchal and hierarchical structures. In the contemporary Japanese press, Rio Wakabayashi of Real Sound praised the series for raising shōjo manga to the "realm of literature" through the depth of its plot and characterization, while Haru Takamine of Christian Today cited the series as a positive depiction of Christianity in manga through its portrayal of sacrifice and unconditional love.

As one of the first ongoing serialized manga in the shōnen-ai genre, The Heart of Thomas is noted for its impact on the contemporary boys' love genre. In her survey of boys' love authors, sociologist Kazuko Suzuki found that The Heart of Thomas was listed as the second-most representative work in the genre, behind Kaze to Ki no Uta by Keiko Takemiya. The manga has attracted significant academic interest, and during the 2010s was one of the most studied and analyzed manga by Western academics. Shamoon notes that much of the Western analysis of The Heart of Thomas examines the manga from the perspective of contemporary gay and lesbian identity, which she argues neglects the work's focus on spiritual love and homosociality in girls' culture.

== Adaptations ==
The Heart of Thomas was loosely adapted into the 1988 live-action film Summer Vacation 1999, directed by Shusuke Kaneko and written by Rio Kishida. The film follows four boys who live alone in an isolated and seemingly frozen-in-time boarding school; the film utilizes a retrofuturistic style, with Kaneko stating that as the original series is not a wholly realist story, he chose to reject realism for its adaptation. The four principal characters are portrayed by female actors in breeches roles, who are dubbed over by voice actors performing in male voices. The film was adapted into a novel by Kishida, which was published in 1992 by Kadokawa Shoten.

In 1996, the theater company Studio Life adapted The Heart of Thomas into a stage play under director Jun Kurata. The adaption is considered a turning point for the company: it began staging plays with male actors exclusively, integrated shingeki (realist) elements into its productions, and changed its repertoire to focus primarily on tanbi (male-male romance) works. The play became one of Studio Life's signature plays, and is regularly performed by the company. The Visitor, the prequel to The Heart of Thomas, has also been adapted by the company.

Writer Riku Onda began to adapt The Heart of Thomas into a prose novel in the late 1990s, but ultimately deviated from the source material to create the original novel Neverland (ネバーランド, Nebārando), which was serialized in the magazine Shōsetsu Subaru from May 1998 to November 1999 and published as a novel in 2000. Hiroshi Mori, who cites Hagio as among his major influences, adapted the manga into the novel The Heart of Thomas – Lost Heart for Thoma (トーマの心臓 – Lost heart for Thoma), which recounts the events of the manga from Oskar's point of view. It was published on July 31, 2009, by the publishing house Media Factory. The cover and frontispiece of the novel are illustrated by Hagio, while prose from the original manga is inserted into the novel as epigraphs to each chapter.
