= He's Expecting (TV series) =

Japanese television series

- Promotional release poster
- Genre: Comedy drama
- Based on: He's Expecting by Eri Sakai
- Written by: Yoshitatsu Yamada; Yukiko Sode; Chihiro Amano
- Directed by: Yuko Hakota (lead); Takeo Kikuchi
- Starring: Takumi Saitoh; Juri Ueno
- Composer: Masaki Hayashi
- Country of origin: Japan
- Original language: Japanese
- No. of seasons: 1
- No. of episodes: 8

Production
- Executive producer: Shinichi Takahashi (Netflix)
- Producers: Yuriko Mamiya (TV Tokyo); Yu Ota (TV Tokyo); Tsutomu Hirabayashi (AOI Pro.)
- Cinematography: Futa Takagi
- Editors: Daisuke Imai; Takuya Onodera
- Camera setup: Single-camera
- Running time: 25 minutes
- Production companies: TV Tokyo; AOI Pro.

Original release
- Network: Netflix, TV Tokyo
- Release: April 21, 2022

He's Expecting (Japanese: ヒヤマケンタロウの妊娠, Hepburn: Hiyama Kentarou no Ninshin) is a Japanese comedy-drama television series co-directed by Yuko Hakota. Loosely based on the 2012 manga Hiyama Kentarou no Ninshin (ヒヤマケンタロウの妊娠) by Eri Sakai, it tells the story of one man's experience being pregnant. The series premiered on Netflix on April 21, 2022, and on TV Tokyo on January 5, 2023. It stars Takumi Saitoh as Kentaro Hiyama, alongside Juri Ueno.

== Synopsis ==
He's Expecting follows the story of "Kentaro Hiyama, an elite ad man, [who] suddenly finds out one day that he is pregnant."

== Cast and characters ==
=== Main ===
- Takumi Saitoh as Kentaro Hiyama:
  A 37-year-old advertising executive who suddenly becomes pregnant. He decides to keep the baby to change people's perspective on male pregnancy. To prepare for the role, Saitoh watched the 1994 Arnold Schwarzenegger film Junior and received advice on how to wear a large prosthetic belly by Ueno.
- Juri Ueno as Aki Seto:
  A 35-year-old freelance journalist and Kentaro's lover who begins to consider the possibility of motherhood. Ueno read the manga and was inspired by how there was a significant amount of female characters.
- Mariko Tsutsui as Tomoko Hiyama:
  The loving, hardworking, overprotective mother of Kentaro, and estranged wife of Eiichi.
  - Yaeko Kiyose as Young Tomoko
- Ryo Iwamatsu as Shigeru Osugi:
  Kentaro's boss.
- Kazuya Takahashi as Dr. Tatsuomi Nakajima:
  A doctor who specializes in the phenomenon of male pregnancy. He is Kentaro's and Shota's doctor.
- Shohei Uno as Shota Miyaji:
  Kentaro's first real friend and fellow pregnant man.
- Maho Yamada as Noriko Miyaji:
  Shota's thoughtful wife, who gave birth to their first child, Takuya. After having her first child she struggled to get pregnant again.
- Lily Franky as Eiichi Takeda:
  The estranged husband of Tomoko and father of Kentaro, who he gave birth to.
  - Kazuki Kawakami as Young Eiichi

=== Supporting ===
- Gaku Hosokawa as Masato Tanabe:
  Kentaro's chauvinistic coworker who takes his place as the advertising director for UNIVE.
- Kou Maehara as Satoru Sawabe:
  Kentaro's coworker
- Yusaku Mori as Hikaru Endo:
  Kentaro's coworker
- Ai Yamamoto as Nana Koga:
  Kentaro's coworker and only female in his advertising team for UNIVE.
- Shima Ise as Yukari Matsuno
- Yukiko Shinohara as Eri:
  Aki's coworker and ex-chief editor.
- Atsushi Hashimoto as Hiroki Takagi:
  Aki's journalist friend.
- Yuriko Ono as Shiori:
  A friend of Aki's
- Mai Kiryu as Narumi Seto:
  Aki's younger sister
- Shigeru Saiki as Hideo Seto:
  Aki's father
- Toshie Negishi as Yasuko Seto:
  Aki's mother

== Episodes ==
=== Series overview ===
Season	Episodes	Originally released
1	8	April 21, 2022

=== Season 1 (2022) ===
No. overall	No. in season	Title	Directed by	Written by	Original (Netflix) release date	TV Tokyo air date
1	1	"Episode 1"	Yuko Hakota	Yoshitatsu Yamada	April 21, 2022	January 5, 2023
Fifty years ago, men all over the world started becoming pregnant. In Japan, there are roughly 40 reported cases a year. Kentaro Hiyama is a 37-year-old advertising executive who has successfully marketed a new campaign for his client called UNIVE, which strives to have the public be more accepting of their looks. Kentaro frequents women, but always comes back to freelance writer Aki Seto who is after a steady job and whom Kentaro views as "mature". Following a night with her, Kentaro begins to feel sick. He vomits at work and goes to get a checkup upon which, to his astonishment, he discovers that he is 9 weeks pregnant. In denial, he hastily buys a pregnancy test which confirms it, before getting a call from his boss, Osugi, telling him that his campaign idea has been accepted, and that he does not have anyone to replace him. Due in 212 days.
2	2	"Episode 2"	Yuko Hakota	Yukiko Sode	April 21, 2022	January 12, 2023
After speaking with her friend, Eri, who has had a baby, despite prior beliefs, Aki attempts to treat her cramps, despite the possible risk of not being able to have children. Kentaro decides to have an abortion, but needs consent from his "partner". He attempts to get in touch with Aki, whom he deduced is the mother, but she is busy and is further nervous around his boss who suspects something is wrong. Kentaro tells Aki about his pregnancy at her apartment. She is at first relieved that he wants an abortion, but a talk with a coworker convinces her the benefits of him having a child. When Kentaro tries to get her to sign the form, she tries to change his mind, but he refuses. Kentaro discovers that his meeting has been moved and Osugi has decided to give the project lead to Masato Tanabe who displays a slightly chauvinistic personality. Due in 206 days.
3	3	"Episode 3"	Takeo Kikuchi	Chihiro Amano	April 21, 2022	January 19, 2023
Kentaro hides his pregnancy so that he can prepare for his abortion. While sitting at the clinic, he encounters another man named Shota Miyaji who is also pregnant, with his second child (his wife had their first). While he befriends him, as well as his wife Noriko and their son Takuya, he tells him that he is considering abortion; leaving Shota visibly disappointed. While pitching UNIVE, Tanabe's presentation does not flatter investors. Kentaro suggests focusing on successful pregnant men, before revealing that he himself is pregnant. The idea is enthusiastically accepted by everyone. He tells Aki he is keeping the baby and she asks to help raise the child while also watching his diet. However, when Kentaro tells his mother, Tomoko, she is against it and he ignores her. Kentaro models for the company and becomes an instant celebrity overnight. Due in 145 days.
4	4	"Episode 4"	Takeo Kikuchi	Yukiko Sode	April 21, 2022	January 26, 2023
Kentaro starts to feel that his previous friends and acquaintances were never really close, but finds solace in Shota. The two of them decide to start an online community for pregnant men to meet various people in different situations. Aki reveals to one of her journalist friends that she is the mother of Kentaro's baby and he suggests doing a personal story about her life with him as opposed to an open-minded piece. Kentaro and Aki learn that they are having a boy and talk afterwards about the pros and cons of marriage. They soon learn that Shota had a miscarriage due to a cytomegalovirus infection. Noriko reveals that while she is sad, she is also relieved as Takuya was being bullied at school and people looked at her differently. Kentaro and Aki argue over the Miyajis' predicament, leading to Kentaro deciding to raise his baby alone. Due in 137 days.
5	5	"Episode 5"	Takeo Kikuchi	Yoshitatsu Yamada	April 21, 2022	February 2, 2023
Kentaro starts to become stressed out by work and tries to resign, but Osugi and the rest of the executives all coerce him into staying with the company. Meanwhile, Aki returns to her hometown to attend her sister's wedding. Her parents, particularly her father, demean her over the fact that her younger sister got married before her. She attends her high school reunion where she starts to get emotional when everyone reveals their shortsighted views on male pregnancy. She returns home and tells her parents her relationship with Kentaro before leaving them for good. She calls and makes amends with Kentaro and the two agree to stay together to raise their child, but not get married and have a "new kind of relationship". Kentaro is suddenly approached by a man, who claims that he is his father who also gave birth to him and whom Tomoko said was dead. Due in 131 days.
6	6	"Episode 6"	Takeo Kikuchi	Yukiko Sode	April 21, 2022	February 9, 2023
Tomoko confirms that the man, Eiichi, is Kentaro's father and he decides to let his father stay with him, despite Tomoko and Aki's concerns. Kentaro and Eiichi end up bonding with one another with the latter coming up with ideas for pregnant men products. Kentaro becomes invested in the ideas, but Aki thinks he is scamming him. Tomoko reveals to Kentaro that Eiichi's pregnancy was socially difficult for him and despite trying to have a decent life, it was too much for him and he ran away sometime after his birth. Aki's colleague offers her a job in Singapore, but she would have to live there for two years, thus she cannot bring herself to tell Kentaro whether she has accepted the position or not. In the morning, Kentaro is shocked to learn that Eiichi has been charged with fraud; putting his career and UNIVE in jeopardy. Due in 54 days.
7	7	"Episode 7"	Yuko Hakota	Chihiro Amano	April 21, 2022	February 16, 2023
Kentaro avoids the paparazzi before meeting with Shota where they make up. Later, he speaks with Aki and Tomoko and he realizes where his father may have gone. Following a comment from Kentaro, Aki and Tomoko have a heart to heart over what it means to be a parent. Kentaro finds Eiichi and the two resolve their issues. Kentaro returns home to find Aki who tells him that she will be taking the Singapore job, but that she will continue to be part of the baby's life and will be able to travel back and forth and provide for them. Kentaro's bosses set up a press conference to clear up the issue regarding Eiichi and gives an impassioned speech about roles which is viewed by everyone. Immediately afterwards, Kentaro suddenly goes into labor, while Aki, who was at the airport to fly to Singapore, rushes out to be by his side. Due in _ days.
8	8	"Episode 8"	Yuko Hakota	Yoshitatsu Yamada	April 21, 2022	February 23, 2023
Kentaro is rushed into an emergency c-section as Eiichi, Tomoko and Aki all meet outside and make up. Kentaro successfully gives birth to a baby boy named Ko "Joy" Hiyama. Kentaro and Aki move in together to raise Ko and take turns looking out for him while they are both working. Aki is given a second chance to decide on her Singapore trip, but is considering turning it down, only for Kentaro to tell her that she should accept it so that they can all be happy. He reveals his plan to start a daycare at work and hopefully run the online community service full time. He happily tells his two female coworkers what he learned and they humorously tell him that that is what all women have been trying to say. Kentaro happily witnesses a young woman showing concern for a pregnant man on the train, revealing the public's changing views.

== Production ==
=== Development ===
On April 8, 2021, it was announced that Netflix and TV Tokyo would co-produced a live-action adaptation of the manga series Kentaro Hiyama's First Pregnancy. According to manga author, Eri Sakai, development for the series began two years before the initial series announcement.

During the Netflix Festival Japan 2021 livestream on November 10, 2021, lead series director Yuko Hakota revealed that the first season will consist of eight episodes, each with a running time around 23 minutes.

=== Casting ===
Alongside the initial series announcement, it was confirmed that Takumi Saitoh and Juri Ueno would star in the series, as Kentaro Hiyama and Aki Seto respectively. The cast also includes Mariko Tsutsui, Lily Franky, Ryo Iwamatsu and Kazuya Takahashi.

=== Filming ===
Principal photography for the first season took place in 2021.

== Reception ==
The series received mixed-to-positive reviews. Praise was aimed at the performances from the two leads and the progressive commentary the series presented. However, there was some criticism aimed at the inconsistent tone and lack of any real stakes. The series was review bombed on IMDb with many misinterpreting the series as being about a transsexual character. Despite implications, the series makes little to no mention or reference to any LGBTQ+ topics, only briefly mentioning pregnant trans men in the very first episode.

== Future ==
Eri Sakai has expressed interest in a follow up season that adapted Childcare Edition. However as of January 2024, no confirmation has been made about a season 2. Sakai has also expressed interest (in now deleted tweets) in a Korean remake and anime adaptation of her manga.
