= Killers (2003 film) =

- DVD cover
- Directed by: Kazuhiro Kiuchi; Shundo Ohkawa; Takanori Tsujimoto; Shuji Kawata; Mamoru Oshii
- Written by: Kazuhiro Kiuchi; Shundo Ohkawa; Takanori Tsujimoto; Shuji Kawata; Mamoru Oshii
- Starring: Nobuyasu Sakai; Keishi Hunt; Chihiro Inoue; Maya Hoshino; Mizutama-Lepputai
- Music by: Kenji Kawai
- Distributed by: Toho
- Release date: June 14, 2003 (Japan)
- Running time: 115 minutes
- Country: Japan
- Language: Japanese

Killers (Japanese: キラーズ, Hepburn: Kirāzu) is a 2003 theatrical compilation of five short film thrillers by five different Japanese directors. This compilation concept's official name is "Omnibus Action Movie".

== Short films ==
1. Pay Off (ペイ・オフ), directed by Kazuhiro Kiuchi
2. Candy (キャンディ), directed by Shundo Ohkawa
3. Perfect Partner (パーフェクト・パートナー), directed by Takanori Tsujimoto
4. Killer Idol (キラー・アイドル), directed by Shuji Kawata
5. .50 Woman (ハーフウーマン), directed by Mamoru Oshii

== Releases ==
=== Book ===
- 2003.06.14: Perfect guidebook Five Bullet On Killers (104p.)

=== Audio ===
- 2003.06.10: Killers Original Soundtrack (KILL-1, 21 tracks)

=== Video ===
- 2003.XX.XX: Rental VHS, Toho Video, TG5598R (Hi-Fi Stereo)
- 2004.03.26: DVD w/extra, Toho Video TDV2760D (DD 2.0)

Making, original trailer, trailer, promotion images, music video "Voice of Love", Maboroshi's opening, audio commentary 1, audio commentary 2.
