= Kazuhiro Kiuchi =

Japanese manga artist

- 木内 一裕
- Born: September 14, 1960 (age 65); Minami-ku, Fukuoka, Japan
- Occupations: Manga artist, film director and novelist
- Years active: Manga: 1983-present Film: 1991-present Novel: 2004-present
- Known for: Be-Bop High School
- Website: www.facebook.com/Kiuchi.Kazuhiro.BeBop

Kazuhiro Kiuchi (きうちかずひろ [木内一裕], Kiuchi Kazuhiro; born September 14, 1960 in Minami-ku, Fukuoka, Japan) is a Japanese manga artist, film director and novelist. As a manga writer, he is best known for the series Be-Bop High School, which won the 1988 Kodansha Manga Award for the general category and was adapted as series of live-action movies and as a 7 episode anime OVA series. He was director of one segment of Killers.

== Manga series ==
- Be-Bop High School (1983–2003)
- Saru Banchō (1996–1997)
- MI-4 (1998–1999)

== Films ==
- Carlos (1991)
- Be-Bop High School (1994)
- Joker (1996)
- Tetsu to Namari (1997)
- Kyōhansha (1999)
- Pay Off (Killers) (2003)
- Out and Out (2018)

== Novels ==
- Wara no Tate (藁の楯), 2004 (Film: Shield of Straw, directed by Takashi Miike, 2013)
  - English translation: Shield of Straw, translated by Asumi Shibata, Vertical, 2016
- Mizu no Naka no Inu (水の中の犬), 2007
  - English translation: A Dog in Water, translated by Maya Rosewood, Vertical, 2013
- Auto ando Auto (Out & Out) (アウト&アウト), 2009
- Kiddo (Kid) (キッド), 2010
- Deddobōru (Dead Ball) (デッドボール), 2011
- Kamisama no Okurimono (神様の贈り物), 2012
- Kenka-Zaru (喧嘩猿), 2013
