= Hiroyuki Nasu =

Japanese film director

- Born: January 27, 1952; Tokyo, Japan
- Died: February 27, 2005 (aged 53)
- Occupation: Film director

Hiroyuki Nasu (那須博之, Nasu Hiroyuki) (January 27, 1952 – February 27, 2005) was a Japanese film director. He won the award for Best Director at the 8th Yokohama Film Festival for Be-Bop High School and Be-Bop High School: Kōkō yo Tarō aika.

== Filmography ==
- Devilman (2004)
- Pinch Runner (2000)
- Jigoku-do reikai tsushin (1996)
- Rokudenashi blues (1996)
- Migimagari No Dandy (1989)
- Be-Bop High School: Koko yotaro kanketsu-hen (1988)
- Be-Bop High School: Koko yotaro ondo (1988)
- Be-Bop High School: Koko yotaro kyoso-kyoku (1987)
- The Shinjuku Love Story (1987)
- Be-Bop High School: Koko yotaro march (1987)
- Shinshi dômei (1986)
- Be-Bop High School: Koko yotaro elegy (1986)
- Be-Bop High School (1985)
- Taboo X tôsaku (1985)
- Baajin nante kowakunai (1984)
- Rouge (1984)
- Ane nikki (1984)
- Bishôjo puroresu: Shisshin 10-byo mae (1984)
- Sêrâ-fuku: Yurizoku 2 (1983)
- Sêrâ-fuku: Yurizoku (1983)
- Waisetsu kazoku: Haha to musume (1982)
