= Kenji Takama =

Japanese cinematographer (born 1949)

Kenji Takama J.S.C. (born March 10, 1949, in Suginami, Tokyo, Japan) is a Japanese cinematographer. Takama is a member of the Japanese Society of Cinematographers.

== Biography ==
As a student at Tokyo Metropolitan University, Kenji Takama first studied Economics. Later, he began working as a camera assistant at Wakamatsu Productions and began shooting commercials, leading to his first assignment as a director of photography on the film Gassan (1978). He received a scholarship to the Artists' Training Program of the Culture Agency, and moved to Hollywood, and then to New York. While in the United States, he trained under a number of cinematographers: Harry Wolf for Little House on the Prairie, John Alonzo for Blue Thunder, John Alcott for The Beast Master, Vilmos Zsigmond for Table for Five, Owen Roizman for Tootsie, and Gordon Willis for Broadway Danny Rose (IMDb, 2019).

After returning to Japan, he worked primarily with younger directors such as Naoto Yamakawa, Shusuke Kaneko, Shun Nakahara and Fran Kuzui. He received the best photography award twice at the Yokohama Film Festival: for Summer Vacation 1999 (1988) and Misty Kid of Wind (1988). At the Osaka Film Festival, he won best cinematography honors for A High School Teacher and Hear The Duck's Song (1993). He also received the Best photography by children Julie at Poland Film Festival for Naran (1995) and was nominated for best photography at the Japanese Academy Award for Welcome Back, Mr. Macdonald (1997). Further, a Japanese Academy Award nom (1998) for 'Rajio no jikan'.

== Filmography ==
- Revolution+1 (2022) - Director of Photography
- Watashi wa zettai yurusanai (2018) - Director of Photography
- The Salt of the Earth, Gunpei Yamamuro (2017) - Director of Photography
- Madou: After the Rain (2017) - Cinematographer
- Kagami no naka no egao tachi (2016) - Cinematographer
- Manga niku to boku (2014) - Cinematographer
- Yokohama Story (2013) - Cinematographer
- Watashi no michi: Waga inochi no tango (2012) - Cinematographer
- Share House (2011) - Cinematographer
- Jazz Jii Men (2011) - Cinematographer
- Manatsu no yo no yume (2009) - Cinematographer
- Cafe Daikanyama III (2009) - Cinematographer
- Puraido (2008) - Cinematographer
- Sunshine Days (2008)
- The Hole (2008) - Cinematographer
- Cindellera of the Entrance Exam (2008) - Cinematographer
- Kotatsu neko (2007) - Cinematographer
- Death Note 2: The Last Name (2007) - Cinematographer
- Ulysses (2006) - Cinematographer
- God's Left Hand, Devil's Right Hand (2006) - Cinematographer
- Haha: Toyoko, aru kazoku no ai to kanashimi (2006) - Cinematographer
- 9/10 (2005) - Cinematographer
- Chô kowai hanashi the movie: yami no eigasai (2005) - Cinematographer
- Taga kokoro nimo ryu wa nemuru (2005) - Cinematographer
- Life on the Longboard (2005) - Cinematographer
- Synesthesia (2005) - Cinematographer
- Fantastipo (2005) - Cinematographer
- Metasequoia no ki no shita de (2005) - Cinematographer
- Shômei kumagai gakkô (documentary) (2004) - Cinematographer
- Road 88: Deaiji shikoku e (2004) - Cinematographer
- Mousugu haru (2004) - Cinematographer
- Kanzen naru shiiku: onna rihatsushi no koi (2003) - Cinematographer
- Shirayuri Club Tokyo e iku (documentary) (2003) - Cinematographer
- Iden & Tity (2003) - Cinematographer
- Hotel Hibiscus (2002) - Cinematographer
- All About Our House (2001) - Cinematographer
- Merdeka 17805 (2001) - Cinematographer
- Crossfire (2000) - Cinematographer
- Nabbie no koi (1999) - Director of Photography
- Rajio no jikan (1997) - Cinematographer
- Dorîmu sutajiamu (1997) - Cinematographer
- Yukai (1997) - Camera Operator
- Tokimeki Memorial (1997) - Cinematographer
- Kimi wo wasurenai (1995) - Cinematographer
- Naran: White Horse (1995) - Cinematographer
- Shiroi Uma: White Horse (1995) - Cinematographer
- Shoot! (1994) - Cinematographer
- High School Teacher (1993) - Cinematographer
- Ahiru no uta ga kikoete kuru yo. (1993) - Cinematographer
- Angel: Boku no uta wa kimi no uta (1992) - Cinematographer
- Usureyuku kioku no nakade (1992) - Cinematographer
- Juninin no yasashii nihonjin (1991) - Cinematographer
- Kaze no kuni (1991) - Cinematographer
- Jutai (1991) - Cinematographer
- Hong Kong Paradise (1990) - Cinematographer
- Docchini suruno (1989) - Cinematographer
- Kaze no matasaburo - Garasu no manto (1989) - Cinematographer
- Last Cabaret (1988) - Cinematographer
- Tokyo Pop (1988) - Camera Operator
- Summer Vacation 1999 (1988) - Cinematographer
- Yamadamura waltz (1988) - Cinematographer
- New Morning of Billy the Kid (1986) - Cinematographer
- Broadway Danny Rose (1984) - Camera Intern (uncredited)
- Table for Five (1983) - Camera Intern (uncredited)
- Blue Thunder (1983) - Camera Operator
- Tootsie (1982) - Camera Intern (uncredited)
- The Beastmaster (1982) - Assistant Camera, Camera Intern
- Gassan (1979) - Cinematographer
- Devil's Song (1975) - Assistant Camera
- Submersion of Japan (1973) - Assistant Camera
- Sei kazoku (1971) - Assistant Camera
