= Kōichirō Uno's Wet and Swinging =

1984 film by Shūsuke Kaneko

- Theatrical poster for Kōichirō Uno's Wet and Swinging (1984)
- Directed by: Shūsuke Kaneko
- Written by: Tomomi Kimura (screenplay); Kōichirō Uno (novel)
- Produced by: Shigeru Kurihara
- Starring: Natsuko Yamamoto; Arisa Hayashi
- Cinematography: Kazumi Sugimoto
- Edited by: Isao Tomita
- Distributed by: Nikkatsu
- Release date: February 17, 1984
- Running time: 55 min.
- Country: Japan
- Language: Japanese

Kōichirō Uno's Wet and Swinging (宇能鴻一郎の濡れて打つ, Uno Kōichirō no nurete utsu), a.k.a. Koichiro Uno's Wet Strike, is a 1984 Japanese pornography film in Nikkatsu's Roman Porno series, directed by Shūsuke Kaneko as his first film, and starring Natsuko Yamamoto and Arisa Hayashi. It was the 21st film in Nikkatsu's series of films based on the works of author Kōichirō Uno.

== Synopsis ==
The film is a parody of Aim for the Ace! (エースを狙え, Ace wo nerae!), a tennis manga. Similar characters to that in the manga include "Madam Butterfly", a rich snob of a professional tennis player, and Hiromi, her suffering opponent.

== Cast ==
- Natsuko Yamamoto as Hiromi Hosokawa
- Arisa Hayashi as Madame Butterfly
- Yūgo Sawada
- Satoru Harada
- Rika Ishii

== Critical appraisal ==
Shūsuke Kaneko won the Yokohama Film Festival award for best new director for this film.

== Legacy ==
Kōichirō Uno's Wet and Swinging was Shūsuke Kaneko's directorial debut. He turned his early success in the Roman porno / pink film genre into a mainstream directorial career. Today he is best known for his films in the kaijū film genre, such as Gamera: Guardian of the Universe (1995) and Godzilla, Mothra & King Ghidorah: Giant Monsters All-Out Attack (2001).

== Availability ==
Kōichirō Uno's Wet and Swinging was released on DVD in Japan on October 21, 2005, as part of Geneon's first wave of Nikkatsu Roman porno series.
