= Rock yo shizukani nagareyo =

- Theatrical release poster

Japanese name
- Kana: ロックよ、静かに流れよ
Transcriptions
- Revised Hepburn: Rock yo shizukani nagareyo
- Directed by: Shunichi Nagasaki
- Written by: Hisao Masuda; Shunichi Nagasaki
- Produced by: Kanjiro Sakura
- Starring: Kenichi Okamoto; Shoji Narita; Kazuya Takahashi; Koyo Maeda; Shizue Abe
- Cinematography: Hiroaki Sugimura
- Edited by: Tomoyo Ōshima
- Music by: Hiroaki Yoshino
- Production companies: Premiere International Corporation; Johnny's Entertainment
- Distributed by: Toho
- Release date: February 20, 1988 (Japan)
- Running time: 100 minutes
- Country: Japan
- Language: Japanese

Rock yo shizukani nagareyo (Japanese: ロックよ、静かに流れよ), also known as Rock Requiem, is a 1988 Japanese film directed by Shunichi Nagasaki.

== Cast ==
- Kenichi Okamoto
- Shoji Narita
- Kazuya Takahashi
- Koyo Maeda
- Shizue Abe
- Masayuki Watanabe
- Takashi Naito
- Akari Uchida
- Akiko Isozaki
- Tomoko Otakara
- Santaro Sakigake
- Tarō Suwa
- Mizuho Suzuki
- Akira Terao

== Awards and nominations ==
10th Yokohama Film Festival

- Won: Best Film
- Won: Best Director – Shunichi Nagasaki
- Won: Best New Actor – Otokogumi (Shoji Narita, Koyo Maeda, Kazuya Takahashi, Kenichi Okamoto)
