= Kōichirō Uno =

Japanese writer

- Born: July 25, 1934 (age 92); Sapporo, Hokkaido, Japan
- Occupations: Novelist, screenwriter
- Writing career
- Genre: Erotica

Kōichirō Uno (宇能鴻一郎, Uno Kōichirō; b. July 25, 1934) is a Japanese author of erotic novels. His works have often been filmed, most notably by Nikkatsu studio in a prolific series of Roman Pornos giving the author's name in the title. He also won the Akutagawa Prize for Kujiragami (鯨神).

== Life and career ==
Kōichirō Uno was born in 1934 and first appeared as an author in the 1960s. He is known for his humorous approach to erotica, and for often taking the woman's point-of-view in his work. Director Chūsei Sone's Sigh (1973) was Nikkatsu's first film version of an Uno story.

Like many of his novels, Trembling is a romantic comedy, written in the first person and narrated by a strong female lead character. This best-selling work was the first that Nikkatsu used as a basis for one of their Roman Porno series of mainstream softcore pornographic films. The success of this 1975 film inspired the studio to sign Uno to a contract for producing the Kōichirō Uno series. Over the next decade at least 23 films were made in the series.

Kōichirō Uno's Dancer of Izu (1984), starring actress Kate Asabuki, is generally considered to be the best of the series. Uno wrote the script to this entry directly for the screen as a parody of Yasunari Kawabata's famous story, The Dancing Girl of Izu. In Uno's version, Kawabata's titular classical dancer was instead a stripper.

Kōichirō Uno's Wet and Swinging (also 1984) was another critically praised Uno film. Director Shusuke Kaneko was given the Yokohama Film Festival award for best new director for this film.

== Filmography ==
- Sigh (ためいき, Tameiki) (1973)
- Trembling (わななき, Wananaki) (1975)
- Kōichirō Uno's Up & Wet (宇能鴻一郎の濡れて立つ, Uno Kōichirō no Nurete Tatsu) (1976)
- Kōichirō Uno's Yummy and Meaty (宇能鴻一郎のむちむちぷりん, Uno Kōichirō no Muchimuchi Purin) (1977)
- Kōichirō Uno's Up and Down (宇能鴻一郎の上と下, Uno Kōichirō no Ue To Shita) (1977)
- 宇能鴻一郎のあげちゃいたいの (1978)
- 宇能鴻一郎の看護婦寮 (1978)
- Kōichirō Uno's Wet and Open (宇能鴻一郎の濡れて開く, Uno Kōichirō no Nurete Hiraku) (1979)
- Kōichirō Uno's Nurses' Journal (宇能鴻一郎の看護婦寮日記, Uno Kōichirō no Kangofu-ryo Nikki) (1979)
- Kōichirō Uno's Female Gymnastic Teacher (宇能鴻一郎の女体育教師, Uno Kōichirō no Onna Taiiku Kyoshi) (1979)
- Kōichirō Uno's Moist and Steamy (宇能鴻一郎のあつく湿って, Uno Kōichirō no Atsuku Shimette) (1979)
- Kōichirō Uno's Wet and Purring (宇能鴻一郎の濡れて悶える, Uno Kōichirō no Nurete Modaeru) (1980)
- Kōichirō Uno's Hotel Maid Diary (宇能鴻一郎のホテルメイド日記, Uno Kōichirō no Hotel Maid Nikki) (1980)
- Kōichirō Uno's Shell Competition (宇能鴻一郎の貝くらべ, Uno Kōichirō no Kaikurabe) (1980)
- Kōichirō Uno's Adultery Diary (宇能鴻一郎の浮気日記, Uno Kōichirō no Uwaki Nikki) (1980)
- 宇能鴻一郎の修道院付属女子寮 (1981)
- 宇能鴻一郎の開いて写して (1981)
- Kōichirō Uno's Wet and Riding (宇能鴻一郎の濡れて騎る, Uno Kōichirō no Nurete Noru) (1981)
- Kōichirō Uno's Teasing A Wife (宇能鴻一郎の人妻いじめ, Uno Kōichirō no Hitozuma Ijime) (1982)
- Kōichirō Uno's Female Doctor Is Also Wet (宇能鴻一郎の女医も濡れるの, Uno Kōichirō no Joi Mo Nureruno) (1982)
- Kōichirō Uno's Dirty Sisters' Barber Shoppe (宇能鴻一郎の姉妹理容師, Uno Kōichirō no Shimai Riyoshitsu) (1983)
- Kōichirō Uno's Wet and Leering (宇能鴻一郎の濡れて学ぶ, Uno Kōichirō no Nurete Manabu) (1983)
- Kōichirō Uno's Wet and Swinging (宇能鴻一郎の濡れて打つ, Uno Kōichirō no Nurete Utsu) (1984)
- Kōichirō Uno's Dancer of Izu (宇能鴻一郎の伊豆の踊子, Uno Kōichirō no Izu No Odoriko) (1984)
- Kōichirō Uno's Caressing the Peach (宇能鴻一郎の桃さぐり, Uno Kōichirō no Momosaguri) (1985)

== See also ==
- The Whale God

== Sources ==
- "KOICHIRO UNO". The Complete Index to World Film.
- Koichiro Uno at IMDb
- "宇能鴻一郎 (Uno Kōichirō)" (in Japanese). Japanese Movie Database.
- Weisser, Thomas; Yuko Mihara Weisser (1998). Japanese Cinema Encyclopedia: The Sex Films. Miami: Vital Books : Asian Cult Cinema Publications. ISBN 1-889288-52-7.
