= Hong Kong Paradise =

1990 film by Shūsuke Kaneko

- DVD cover
- Directed by: Shūsuke Kaneko
- Written by: Shūsuke Kaneko
- Produced by: Sadatoshi Fujimine
- Starring: Yuki Saito; Kaoru Kobayashi; Yuu Aihara; Yoshiyuki Ohsawa; Miyuki Imori
- Cinematography: Kenji Takama
- Edited by: Isao Tomita
- Music by: Shigeru Umebayashi
- Production companies: Toho; Sundance Company
- Distributed by: Toho
- Release date: 28 April 1990 (Japan)
- Running time: 98 minutes
- Country: Japan
- Language: Japanese

Hong Kong Paradise (Japanese: 香港パラダイス, Hepburn: Honkon paradaisu) is a 1990 Japanese film directed by Shūsuke Kaneko. It was theatrically released by Toho on April 28, 1990, in Japan. Yuki Saito won the Best Actress award at the Yokohama Film Festival for her performance in this film.

== Cast ==
- Yuki Saito
- Kaoru Kobayashi
- Yuu Aihara
- Yoshiyuki Ohsawa
- Miyuki Imori
- Chin Naitō
- Gloria Yip (as Gloria Yip Wan-Yee)
- Yasunori Danta
- Ginji Gaō
- Tsuyoshi Ihara
- Hideyo Amamoto
- Makoto Ōtake
- Kai Atō
- Miyuki Ono
- Keiko Awaji
