= Be-Bop High School =

Japanese manga series by Kazuhiro Kiuchi

- First tankōbon volume cover, featuring Toru Nakama (left) and Hiroshi Kato (right)

ビー・バップ・ハイスクール (Bī Bappu Hai Sukūru)
- Genre: Yankī
- Manga
- Written by: Kazuhiro Kiuchi
- Published by: Kodansha
- Imprint: Yanmaga KC Special
- Magazine: Weekly Young Magazine
- Original run: 1983 – 2003
- Volumes: 48
Further information
Live-action film
Directed by	Hiroyuki Nasu
Released	December 14, 1985
Runtime	90 minutes
Live-action film
Be-Bop High School: Kōkō Yotarō Aika
Directed by	Hiroyuki Nasu
Released	August 9, 1986
Runtime	95 minutes
Live-action film
Be-Bop High School: Kōkō Yotarō Kōshinkyoku
Directed by	Hiroyuki Nasu
Released	March 21, 1987
Runtime	96 minutes
Live-action film
Be-Bop High School: Kōkō Yotarō Kyōsō-kyoku
Directed by	Hiroyuki Nasu
Released	December 12, 1987
Runtime	90 minutes
Live-action film
Be-Bop High School: Kōkō Yotarō Ondo
Directed by	Hiroyuki Nasu
Released	August 6, 1988
Runtime	90 minutes
Live-action film
Be-Bop High School: Kōkō Yotarō Kanketsu-hen
Directed by	Hiroyuki Nasu
Released	December 17, 1988
Runtime	90 minutes
Video game
Be-Bop High School: Kōkōsei Gokuraku Densetsu
Developer	Data East
Publisher	Data East
Genre	Adventure
Platform	Nintendo Family Computer
Released	JP: March 30, 1988
Original video animation
Directed by	Toshihiko Arisako (1–2, 6); Hiroyuki Kakudō (3–5); Junichi Fujise (7)
Written by	Kazuhiro Kiuchi (1–3); Kazumasa Kiuchi (1–3); Tatsuhiko Urahata (4–5); Sara Uemura (6)
Studio	Toei Animation
Released	January 26, 1990 – December 11, 1998
Episodes	7
Live-action film
Directed by	Kazuhiro Kiuchi
Released	February 19, 1994
Television drama
Original network	TBS
Original run	June 16, 2004 – August 17, 2005
Episodes	2
- icon

Be-Bop High School (Japanese: ビー・バップ・ハイスクール, Hepburn: Bī Bappu Hai Sukūru) is a Japanese manga series written and illustrated by Kazuhiro Kiuchi. It was serialized in Kodansha's seinen manga magazine Weekly Young Magazine from 1983 to 2003, with its chapters collected in 48 tankōbon volumes. It has been adapted into seven live-action films, a video game, and an original video animation (OVA) series.

The manga has sold over 40 million copies, making it one of the best-selling manga series of all time. In 1988, the series won the 12th Kodansha Manga Award in the general category.

== Story ==
The series revolves around the lives of two rough-and-tumble high school friends, Hiroshi Kato (加藤 浩志, Katō Hiroshi) and Toru Nakama (中間 徹, Nakama Tōru), who frequently cause trouble and start fights. Toru and Hiroshi style their hair in punch perms and also adopt exaggerated swaggering gaits. The manga also features an assortment of outlandish characters who also sport unusual fashions and hairstyles.

== Media ==
=== Manga ===
Written and illustrated by Kazuhiro Kiuchi, Be-Bop High School was serialized in Kodansha's seinen manga magazine Weekly Young Magazine from 1983 to 2003. Kodansha collected its chapters in 48 tankōbon volumes, released from March 17, 1984, to January 6, 2004.

A spin-off parody by Memeoka Manhiru, titled Be-Bop Kaizokuban (ビー・バップ海賊版), was serialized in Bessatsu Young Magazine, and its chapters were collected in six tankōbon volumes, released from January 1990 to January 1996.

=== Live-action films ===
There are seven live-action films based on the manga; six films directed by Hiroyuki Nasu and released between 1985 and 1988, and a 1994 film directed by the manga's own author, Kazuhiro Kiuchi.

1. Be-Bop High School (ビー・バップ・ハイスクール) (December 14, 1985)
2. Be-Bop High School: Kōkō Yotarō Aika (ビー・バップ・ハイスクール 高校与太郎哀歌) (August 9, 1986)
3. Be-Bop High School: Kōkō Yotarō Kōshinkyoku (ビー・バップ・ハイスクール 高校与太郎行進曲) (March 21, 1987)
4. Be-Bop High School: Kōkō Yotarō Kyōsō-kyoku (ビー・バップ・ハイスクール 高校与太郎狂騒曲) (December 12, 1987)
5. Be-Bop High School: Kōkō Yotarō Ondo (ビー・バップ・ハイスクール 高校与太郎音頭) (August 6, 1988)
6. Be-Bop High School: Kōkō Yotarō Kanketsu-hen (ビー・バップ・ハイスクール 高校与太郎完結篇) (December 17, 1988)
7. Be-Bop High School (ビー・バップ・ハイスクール) (February 19, 1994)

=== Video game ===
A video game, titled Be-Bop High School: Kōkōsei Gokuraku Densetsu (ビーバップハイスクール 高校生極楽伝説, Bi-Bappu Hai Sukuru: Kōkōsei Gokuraku Densetsu), was released on March 30, 1988, by Data East for the Nintendo Famicom console.

=== Original video animation ===
A seven-episode original video animation (OVA) adaptation, animated by Toei Animation, was released between January 26, 1990, to December 11, 1998. A three-episode OVA, based on Be-Bop Kaizokuban, was released between 1991 and 1993.

=== Drama ===
A special television drama adaptation of two episodes was broadcast on TBS on June 16, 2004, and August 17, 2005.

== Reception ==
The manga has sold over 40 million copies. The series' eighth volume had a first print run of 2.27 million copies in 1987, making it the publisher's highest first print run of all time; the record was broken by Attack on Titan's 13th volume in 2014, which had a first print run of 2.75 million copies.

In 1988, alongside Bonobono, Be-Bop High School won the 12th Kodansha Manga Award in the general category.
