= Yamiutsu shinzo =

Heart, Beating in the Dark
- DVD cover
- Directed by: Shunichi Nagasaki
- Written by: Shunichi Nagasaki
- Produced by: Shirō Sasaki; Yoshihiko Higashi; Satashi Kuono
- Starring: Noriko Eguchi; Shoichi Honda; Kaori Mizushima; Shigeru Muroi; Takashi Naitō; Taro Suwa
- Cinematography: Masami Tuomoto
- Edited by: Sumiyo Mitsuhashi
- Music by: Otomo Yoshihide
- Production companies: Office Shirous; Bandai Visual
- Release date: 2005
- Running time: 104 minutes
- Country: Japan
- Language: Japanese

Heart, Beating in the Dark (Japanese: 闇打つ心臓, Hepburn: Yamiutsu shinzo) is a 2005 film directed by Japanese director Shunichi Nagasaki, partly a remake and partly a sequel to his 1982 film of the same name.

== Plot ==
The film has three threads running through it, and also includes footage from the 1982 original throughout:

- One is the story of a couple who are on the run after killing their baby. This is a largely a remake of the original 1982 film.
- Another thread shows the present-day couple from the original film as they meet again many years after the original events.
- The third thread is supposedly documentary footage of the making of the remake, showing in particular the feelings of the original actors about the characters they played in 1982.

== Cast ==
- Noriko Eguchi as Yuki
- Shoichi Honda as Toru
- Kaori Mizushima as Ritsuko
- Shigeru Muroi as Inako
- Takashi Naitō as Ringo
- Taro Suwa as Shimamoto
