= Who Do I Choose? =

1989 film by Shūsuke Kaneko

- Theatrical release poster
- Directed by: Shūsuke Kaneko
- Written by: Shūsuke Kaneko; Jiro Akagawa
- Produced by: Yoshio Sakai; Ikuo Suo
- Starring: Miho Nakayama; Chieri Itō; Toru Kazama; Hiroyuki Sanada; Katsuya Kobayashi
- Cinematography: Kenji Takama
- Edited by: Isao Tomita
- Music by: Masahiro Kawasaki; Anri
- Distributed by: Toho
- Release date: August 26, 1989 (Japan)
- Running time: 100 minutes
- Language: Japanese

Who Do I Choose? (Japanese: どっちにするの。, Hepburn: Dotchi-ni suru-no) is a 1989 Japanese film directed by Shūsuke Kaneko. It was released by Toho on August 26, 1989, in Japan. For her role in the film, actress Rie Miyazawa won the Nikkan Sports Film Award for Best New Talent. Cinematographer Kenji Takama won a Yokohama Film Festival award for his work in this film.

== Cast ==
- Miho Nakayama
- Chieri Itō
- Toru Kazama
- Hiroyuki Sanada
- Katsuya Kobayashi
- Rie Miyazawa
- Renji Ishibashi
- Koichi Ueda
