= Messiah (2011 film) =

2011 film by Shūsuke Kaneko

- Theatrical release poster
- Directed by: Shusuke Kaneko
- Starring: Atsushi Arai; Masahiro Inoue; Minehiro Kinomoto; Sho Jinnai
- Release date: October 15, 2011 (Japan)
- Running time: 93 minutes
- Country: Japan
- Language: Japanese

Messiah (Japanese: メサイア) is a 2011 Japanese film directed by Shusuke Kaneko.

== Cast ==
- Atsushi Arai as Eiri Kaido
- Masahiro Inoue
- Minehiro Kinomoto
- Sho Jinnai
