= Yuwakusha =

Yuwakusha 誘惑者
- Film poster
- Directed by: Shunichi Nagasaki
- Written by: Shunichi Nagasaki; Goro Nakajima; Tomoko Ogawa
- Produced by: Toshiro Kamata; Kei Sasaki
- Starring: Kumiko Akiyoshi; Kiwako Harada; Masao Kusakari
- Cinematography: Makoto Watanabe
- Edited by: Yoshiyuki Okuhara
- Music by: Satoshi Kadokura
- Distributed by: Asmik Ace Entertainment
- Release date: 29 October 1989 (Japan)
- Running time: 109 minutes
- Country: Japan
- Language: Japanese

Yuwakusha (Japanese: 誘惑者; lit. The Enchantment) is a 1989 Japanese film directed by Shunichi Nagasaki.

== Cast ==
- Kumiko Akiyoshi as Miyako Shinohara
- Kiwako Harada as Harumi Yoshii
- Masao Kusakari as Kazuhiko Sotomura
- Renji Ishibashi as Tsuburagi

== See also ==
- List of lesbian, gay, bisexual or transgender-related films
