= Puzzle (2014 film) =

- Poster
- Directed by: Eisuke Naito
- Based on: Puzzle by Yusuke Yamada
- Starring: Kaho; Shuhei Nomura; Kazuya Takahashi; Saori Yagi; Kokone Sasaki; Ryuzo Tanaka; Baku Owada
- Release date: March 8, 2014 (Japan)
- Running time: 86 minutes
- Country: Japan
- Language: Japanese

Puzzle (パズル) is a 2014 Japanese high school horror film directed by Eisuke Naito and based on the novel by Yusuke Yamada. It was released on March 8, 2014.

== Cast ==
- Kaho as Azusa Nakamura
- Shuhei Nomura as Shigeo Yuasa
- Kazuya Takahashi
- Saori Yagi
- Kokone Sasaki
- Ryuzo Tanaka
- Baku Owada
