= Yukari Tachibana =

Japanese actress

Yukari Tachibana (橘 ゆかり Tachibana Yukari; born 8 October 1965 in Tokyo, Japan) is a Japanese actress. She appeared in Happy Wedding (Oishii Kekkon) and Moment Girl (瞬間少女, Shunkan Shoujo), among other film and television roles.
