= Last Cabaret =

1988 film by Shūsuke Kaneko

- DVD cover
- Directed by: Shusuke Kaneko
- Starring: Miyuki Katō; Yasuo Daichi; Yōko Takagi; Kyōko Hashimoto; Kō Watanabe
- Cinematography: Kenji Takama
- Distributed by: Nikkatsu
- Release date: 23 April 1988 (Japan)
- Running time: 78 minutes
- Country: Japan
- Language: Japanese

Last Cabaret (Japanese: ラスト・キャバレー, Hepburn: Rasuto kyabaree) is a 1988 Japanese erotic drama film directed by Shusuke Kaneko. It was released on 23 April 1988. The film was the second-to-last entry in Nikkatsu's series of Roman Porno films, a higher budget version of the pink film.

== Plot ==
When a greedy land developer forces a popular cabaret to shut down, the owner's daughter goes on a trek to visit her father's old girlfriends to reminisce about the past. The story has been taken by critics as a metaphor for the demise of the Nikkatsu studio itself which would soon halt film production.

== Cast ==
- Miyuki Katō
- Yasuo Daichi
- Yōko Takagi
- Kyōko Hashimoto
- Kō Watanabe

== Reception ==
=== Accolades ===
It was chosen as the 9th best film at the 10th Yokohama Film Festival.

Award	Date	Category	Recipients and nominees	Result
Yokohama Film Festival	1989	Best Director	Shusuke Kaneko	Won
