= Kazuya Takahashi =

Japanese actor and musician (born 1969)

- Born: Kazuya Takahashi (高橋 一也, Takahashi Kazuya); 20 May 1969 (age 57); Tokyo, Japan
- Occupations: Actor, musician
- Years active: 1988–present

Kazuya Takahashi (高橋 和也, Takahashi Kazuya; born 20 May 1969) is a Japanese actor, singer, songwriter and bassist. He was a vocalist and bassist of Otokogumi, the Japanese rock band which was active during late 1980s and early 1990s. Takahashi has appeared in more than 50 films since 1988.

== Career ==
He was a vocalist and bassist of Otokogumi, the Japanese rock band debuted in August, 1988. The debut single titled "Daybreak" recorded the weekly Top Singles Sales on the Oricon in Japan and Otokogumi won the Best New Artist Award in the 30th Japan Record Awards. Otokogumi released 10 singles and 8 albums in total.

After the inactivation of Otokogumi in 1993, he has released songs in the genres of rock and country music. He is a big fan of Hank Williams.

Takahashi has appeared in more than fifty films since 1988.

== Selected filmography ==
=== Films ===
Year	Title	Role	Notes	Ref.
1988	Rock yo shizukani nagareyo	Tsutomu "Tonda" Toda	Lead role	
1995	Kamikaze Taxi	Tatsuo		
2001	Hush!	Naoya Hase		
2008	Still Walking	Nobuo Kataoka		
2010	Sword of Desperation	Denichirō		
2013	Like Father, Like Son	Daisuke Nonomiya		
2013	Shield of Straw			
2014	Puzzle			
2014	The Light Shines Only There	Nakajima		
2016	Jinx!!!	Kiyoharu Satō		
2016	After the Storm			
2017	Ringside Story			
2018	Tatta Ichido no Uta	Daisuke Gotoda, Norihiko Tachibana		
2019	The Journalist			
2019	Hot Gimmick: Girl Meets Boy			
2019	Family of Strangers	Ōtani		
2019	The Flowers of Evil	Sawa's father		
2021	Suicide Forest Village			
2021	Shrieking in the Rain	Tachibana		
2022	Once Hit the Bottom	Masato Makishima		
2022	Tsuisō Journey	Mysterious man		
2022	The Broken Commandment			
2023	Between the White Key and the Black Key	Miki		
2024	Onpaku		Hong Kong film	
2026	Samurai Vengeance	Yoshizawa Hotaru		

=== Television ===
Year	Title	Role	Notes	Ref.
2000	Aoi	Ōno Harufusa	Taiga drama	
2007	Fūrin Kazan	Baba Nobuharu	Taiga drama	
2012	Victory in Defeat	Eisaku Satō		
2016	Sanada Maru	Ukita Hideie	Taiga drama	
2017	Edo Castle Muketsu Kaijō	Katsu Kaishū		
2018	Smoking	Kenuma		
2019	Ieyasu, Edo wo Tateru			
2019	Everyone's Demoted	Kōhei Hanazawa		
2022	He's Expecting	Dr. Tatsuomi Nakajima		
2023	The Days			
2023	Informa	Katsuji Maruyama		
2026	Water Margin	Zhu Gui		
2026	Straight to Hell			

=== Dubbing ===
- Lee Byung-hun
  - Beautiful Days – Lee Min-chul
  - All In – Kim In-ha
  - Everybody Has Secrets – Choi Su-hyeon
  - A Bittersweet Life – Kim Sun-woo
  - Once in a Summer – Yun Suk-young
  - The Good, the Bad, the Weird – Park Chang-yi
  - I Saw the Devil – Soo-hyun
  - Masquerade (BS Japan edition) – King Gwanghae/Ha-sun
  - Memories of the Sword – Deok-gi/Yoo-baek
- The Transporter (2004 TV Asahi edition) – Darren "Wall Street" Bettencourt (Matt Schulze)

== Discography ==
Albums

- 1994 BrandNew Road to the Origin (Kazuya and Rock Fork)
- 2000 Nervous Circus Kiki-Ippatu (Kazuya Takahashi with Nervous Circus)
- 2020 Love from the MOUNTAIN (The Driving Cowboys)

Singles

- 2011 Tokyo Boogiey Life
