= Natsuko Yamamoto =

Japanese actress

- Occupation: actor

Natsuko Yamamoto (山本奈津子 Yamamoto Natsuko) is a Japanese actress.

== Filmography ==
1. セーラー服百合族 (Seiraafuku yurizoku) (1983)
2. セーラー服百合族2 (Seiraafuku yurizoku 2) (1983)
3. Kōichirō Uno's Wet and Swinging (宇能鴻一郎の濡れて打つ, Uno Koichiro no nurete utsu) (1984)
4. 夕ぐれ族 (Yuugurezoku) (1984)
5. 不純な関係 (Fujun na kankei) (1984)
6. ロリータ妻 微熱 (1984)
7. OL百合族 19歳 (OL yurizoku jyukyu sai) (1984)
8. The Shogunate's Harem (大奥十八景; Ooku jyuhakkei) (1986)
9. 春らんまん結婚記 (Haruranmen kekkon-ki?) (1987)
10. 花園の迷宮(1988)
11. God's Left Hand, Devil's Right Hand (神の左手 悪魔の右手, Kami no Hidarite, Akuma no Migite)
12. 絶対やせる 電エース 宇宙大怪獣ギララ登場！/宇宙怪獣小進撃！(2007)
