= Takumi Saitoh =

Japanese actor and filmmaker (born 1981)

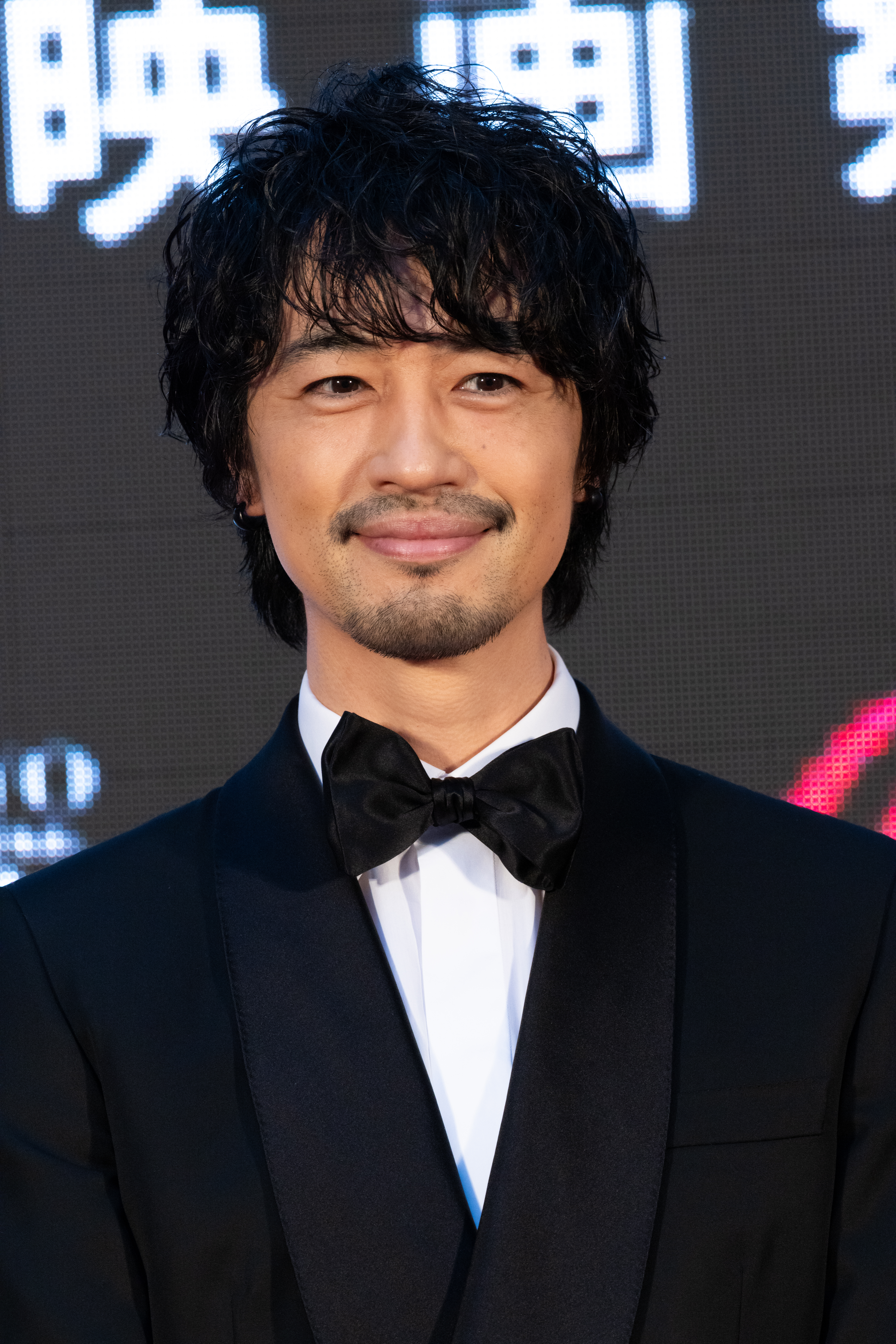
- Saitoh at the 2024 Tokyo International Film Festival
- Born: Takumi Saito (齊藤 工, Saitō Takumi); August 22, 1981 (age 45); Tokyo, Japan
- Occupations: Actor; film director; photographer; former model
- Years active: 1996–present

Takumi Saitoh (斎藤 工, Saitō Takumi; born August 22, 1981) is a Japanese actor and filmmaker. He directs films under his birthname, Takumi Saito (齊藤 工, Saitō Takumi), spelled differently in Kanji but pronounced the same.

== Early life and work ==
Saito was born on August 22, 1981, in Minato, Tokyo. Saitoh's father worked in the film industry and he would often visit him at work as a child, which he later cited as his inspiration to become an actor.

While still attending high school, Saitoh signed a modeling contract with Indigo at age 15.

== Filmography ==
=== Films ===
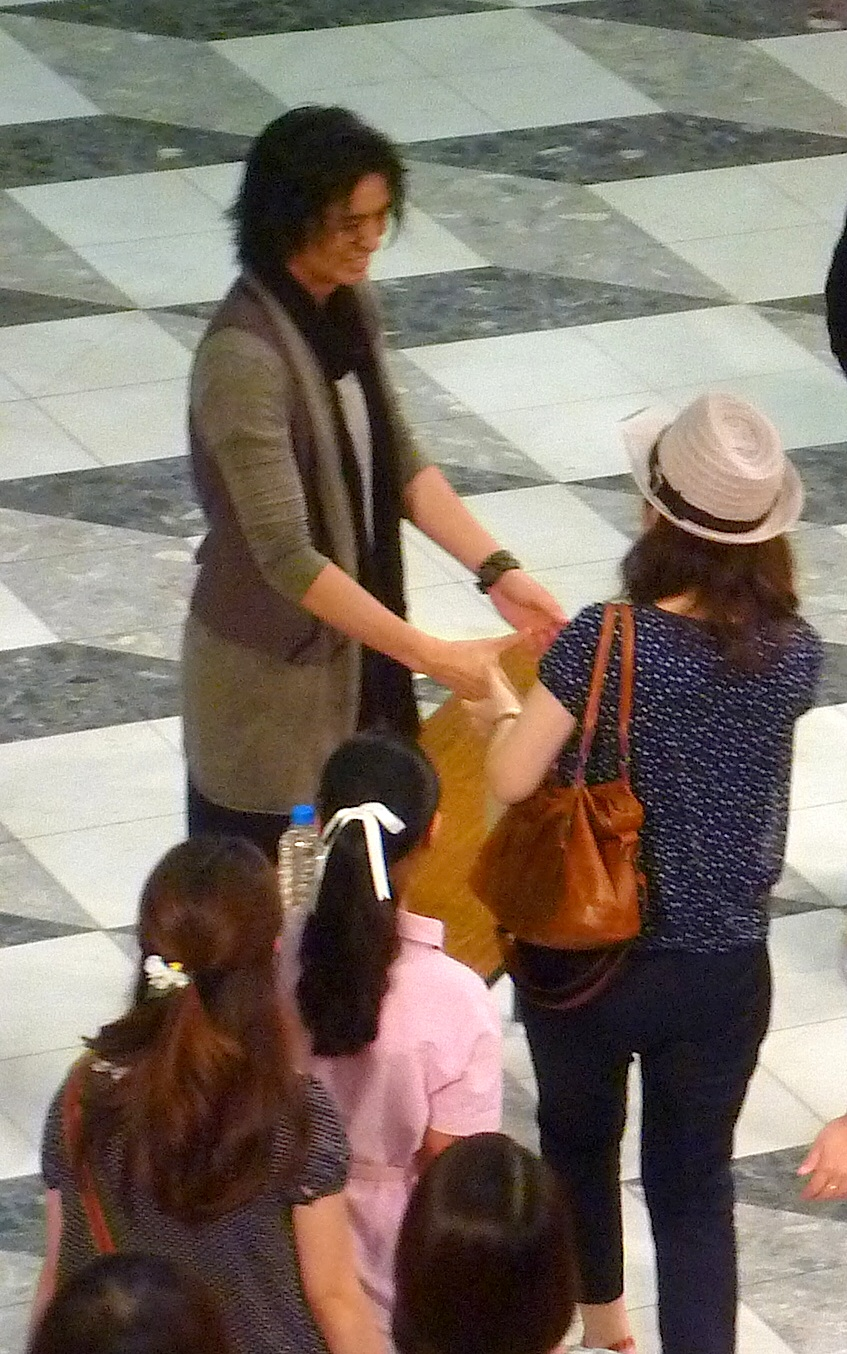
With fans in 2011

As director

- Zokki (2020)
- Home Sweet Home (2023)

As actor

- Elevator Trap (2009), Jun Ogawa
- The Projects (2016)
- Shin Godzilla (2016)
- A Sower of Seeds 3 (2016)
- A Gambler's Odyssey 2020 (2019), Bouya Tetsu
- State of Emergency (2020)
- Beautiful Dreamer (2020), Takumi
- Kiba: The Fangs of Fiction (2021)
- Love Mooning (2021), Shigeru Uchiyama
- Cube (2021), Hiroshi Ide
- Last of the Wolves (2021), Yūma Tachibana
- Shin Ultraman (2022), Shinji Kaminaga
- Goodbye Cruel World (2022)
- Ichikei's Crow: The Movie (2023), Shingo Tsukimoto
- The Legend and Butterfly (2023), Tokugawa Ieyasu
- Downfall (2023), Kaoru Fukazawa
- Shin Kamen Rider (2023), an Intelligence Agency official
- Bushido (2024), Shibata Hyogo
- Brush of the God (2024)
- The Gesuidouz (2025), John Cage (voice)
- The Boy and the Dog (2025), Toru Uchimura
- Bullet Train Explosion (2025), Yuichi Kasagi
- Spirit World (2025)
- A Light in the Harbor (2025), Ryutaro Yashiro
- Road to Vendetta (2025)
- This Is I (2026), Koji Wada
- Mag Mag (2026)
- Magical Secret Tour (2026)
- Kingdom 5: The Clash of Souls (2026), Lord Chunshen
- All That Exists (2027), Takaaki Senzaki

=== Television ===
- My Husband Is a Cartoonist (2010), Akira Komine
- QP (2011) as Ryo Azuma
- Yae's Sakura (2013), Jinbo Shuri
- Hirugao: Love Affairs in the Afternoon (2014), Yuichiro Kitano
- Idaten (2019), Katsuo Takaishi
- Shiroi Kyotō (2019), Tōru Sekiguchi
- He's Expecting (2022), Kentaro Hiyama
- The Queen of Villains (2024), Toshikuni Matsunaga
- The Diamond Sleeping Under the Sea (2024), Shinpei
- Criminal (2026), Yarimizu
- The Shogunate Rebel (2027), Shimazu Hisamitsu

=== Dubbing ===
- Journey to the West: Conquering the Demons (2013), Tang Sanzang (Wen Zhang)
- Assassin's Creed (2016), Callum "Cal" Lynch / Aguilar de Nerha (Michael Fassbender)
- Paddington 2 (2017), Phoenix Buchanan (Hugh Grant)

== Discography ==
- Musical Tennis no Ōjisama Best Actor Series 004

Cover	Info	Tracks List
	Musical Tennis no Ōjisama Best Actor Series 004 Takumi Saitoh as Yūshi Oshitari & Ruito Aoyagi as Gakuto Mukahi; Release date: July 26, 2006; Catalog number: NECA-23004	1. Instrumental: "On My Way (DL3 Ver.)"; 2. "Katsu no wa Hyōtei"; 3. "Do Your Best! (Rap! Ver.)"; 4. Instrumental: "Kōnai Ranking-sen"; 5. Instrumental: "Kawabe nite" 6. "Makezugirai (Yūshi and Gakuto Edition)"; 7. "Bohemian Blue"; 8. "Jump to It!!"; 9. "Missing Piece"; 10. "Saitoh Takumi & Aoyagi Ruito: Message for You"

- Kokoro no Gururi [album]

Cover	Info	Tracks List
	Takumi Saitoh's First Mini Album: Kokoro no Gururi Release date: December 5, 2007	01. Saisyo to saigo no sorae 02. Arifureta mono mitaini 03. Duralumin; 04. Cheap Gold; 05. Kanashikute yarikirenai (Cover Version); 06. Tsuki no fune 07. Trekker (Bonus Track)

- "Saigo no Christmas" [limited edition CD single]

Cover	Info	Tracks List
	"Saigo no Christmas" (from the Play The Family) Release date: February 2, 2008	1. "Saigo no Christmas"; 2. "Saigo no Christmas" (Instrumental)

== Awards ==
Year	Award	Category	Work(s)	Result	Ref.
2015	39th Elan d'or Awards	Newcomer of the Year	Himself	Won	
