= Otokogumi =

Japanese boy band

Otokogumi 男闘呼組(おとこぐみ)
- Origin: Japan
- Genres: Rock, Pop-rock, Rock'n Roll
- Years active: 1988–1993, 2022-2023
- Labels: BMV Victor
- Past members: Shoji Narita; Kazuya Takahashi; Kenichi Okamoto; Koyo Maeda
- Website: otokogumi.tokyo

Otokogumi (男闘呼組(おとこぐみ)) was a Japanese pop music idol group managed by Japanese talent agency Johnny & Associates from 1988 to 1993. They were the first talents from the agency, who would debut not only as idols but as musicians who could play on music instruments. In 2022, they announced resume of their music activities for the period of one year.

== History ==
Some of the members, such as Narita, Okamoto and Takahashi joined the idol agency Johnny's in 1984 and were part of the junior group. In 1986, they hosted their own variety television show "Idol Hanagumi Otokogumi" on NTV.

In early 1988, half a year before their debut, they made their first stage performances along with Shounen Ninja and Shonentai together as "Gosanke (少年御三家)" on Nippon Budokan. In August of the same year, they made music major debut with the single "Daybreak" released under BMG Victor label. The single became a number one hit during its first week of released and remained on number four on the 1988 yearly single rankings. On 31 December 1988 they received an award from the category "Best New Artist" on the 30th Japan Record Awards and made their first television appearance on the national end-year program Kōhaku Uta Gassen. In 1991, with the release of the sixth single "Angel", they started to write and compose songs on their own. In 1993, after the departure of Takahashi, the group suddenly went on the hiatus. Soon after Narita and Maeda left the agency, leaving only Morita in the agency up until 2021.

In 2022, the group suddenly announced the resuming of their music activities on the same day, when the list of performers on the TBS music television program "Ongaku no Hi" was announced. It was later revealed that some of the members start to meet together few weeks before Johnny Kitagawa's death in 2019 and slowly built interest from each other to start doing music together again. In the same year, they launched new rock band "Rockon Social Club" with the bassist Yohito Teraoka from the Jun Sky Walker(s).

In 2023, they launched their final live tour "Otokogumi 2023 The Last Live". The group decided to focus on the venues where they had scheduled live performances at the time before their hiatus in 1993.

In January 2024, they announced a public statement about donating 40 million yen from the final day of their concert to the victims of the 2024 Noto earthquake.

== Members ==
- Narita Shouji (成田(なりた) 昭次(しょうじ), Shouji Narita; born August 1, 1968): Vocal, Lead Guitar
- Takahashi Kazuya (高橋(たかはし) 和也(かずや), Kazuya Takahashi; born May 20, 1969): Vocal, Bass
- Okamoto Kenichi (岡本(おかもと) 健一(けんいち), Kenichi Okamoto; born May 21, 1969): Vocal, Rhythm Guitar
- Maeda Kouyou (前田(まえだ) 耕陽(こうよう), Koyo Maeda; born August 16, 1968): Leader, Vocal, Keyboard, Drum

=== Former members ===
- Moriya Jirou (守屋二郎(もりや) 二郎(じろう), Jirou Moriya; born January 21, 1967): Bass
- Tsuchida Kazunori (土田(つちだ) 一徳(かずのり), Kazunori Tsuchida; born June 28, 1969): Keyboard
- Endou Naoto (遠藤(えんどう) 直人(なおと), Naoto Endou; born April 20, 1969): Keyboard

== Discography ==
=== Singles ===
Year	Album	Chart positions (JP)	Label
1988	"Daybreak"	1	BMG Victor
1988	"Aki" (秋)	1	BMG Victor
1989	"Time Zone"	1	BMG Victor
1989	"Cross to You/Rockin' My Soul"	1	BMG Victor
1990	"Don't Sleep"	2	BMG Victor
1991	"Angel"	2	BMG Victor
1992	"Nemuritsuku Mae Ni" (眠りにつく前に)	24	BMG Victor
1992	"Thursday Morning"	25	BMG Victor
1992	"The Front"	35	BMG Victor
1993	"Tokyo Plastic Shonen" (TOKYOプラスティック少年)	68	BMG Victor

=== Albums ===
==== Studio albums ====
Title	Album details	Peak chart positions
Title	Album details	JPN Oricon
Otokogumi (男闘呼組)	Released: 1988.9.26; Label: BMG Victor; Formats: CD, LP, Cassette tape	2
Otokogumi Nimaime (男闘呼組 二枚目)	Released: 1989.6.28; Label: BMG Victor; Formats: CD, LP, Cassette tape	2
San (参)	Released: 1990.3.28; Label: BMG Victor; Formats: CD, Cassette tape	1
I'm Waiting 4 You	Released: 1991.2.21; Label: BMG Victor; Formats: CD, Cassette tape	3
5-1 Higenjitsu (5-1…非現実…)	Released: 1992.6.21; Label: BMG Victor; Formats: CD	9
5-2 Saininshiki (5-2…再認識…)	Released: 1992.7.22; Label: BMG Victor; Formats: CD	12
5-3 Mugenjitsu (5-3…無現実…)	Released: 1992.8.21; Label: BMG Victor; Formats: CD	11
Rokudenashi (ロクデナシ)	Released: 1993.8.21; Label: BMG Victor; Formats: CD	35

==== Compilation albums ====
Title	Album details	Peak chart positions
Title	Album details	JPN Oricon
Best of Ballads	Released: 1992.12.2; Label: BMG Victor; Formats: CD	-
New Best Otokogumi (男闘呼組)	Released: 1994.11.23; Label: BMG Victor; Formats: CD	-
Hit Collection	Released: 1999.11.20.; Label: BMG Victor; Formats: CD	-

== Videography ==
	Release	Title
1	1987.8.3日	Made in U.S.A.
2	1987.12.16	Best Friend
3	1988.2.18	Xing point
4	1989.9.6	Endless Trip
5	1989.11.21	Otokogumi Big Tour'89 in Dome
6	1990.8.24	Otokogumi 2,050,000 Byo no Kiseki
7	1991.7.21	Otokogumi Live in Yokohama 1991 vol.1
8	1991.7.21	Otokogumi Live in Yokohama 1991 vol.2
9	1992.11.1	Kara to Boku、Watasi to Jibun wa Minna Nakayoshi
10	2024.3.15	Otokogumi Last Forever

== Sites ==
- Official Website
