= Shunichi Nagasaki =

Japanese film director and screenwriter (born 1956)

- Born: 18 June 1956 (age 70); Yokohama, Kanagawa, Japan
- Occupation: Film director

Shunichi Nagasaki (長崎俊一, Nagasaki Shun'ichi; 18 June 1956) is a Japanese film director and screenwriter.

== Filmography ==
=== Director ===
==== Film ====
- Yumeko Zanshi a.k.a. Yumeko’s Death (1977)
- Yuki Ga Rokku o Suteta Natsu a.k.a. The Summer Yuki Gave Up Rock Music (1978)
- Crazy Love (1978)
- Eiko, Become the Night (1979)
- Back of Happy Street (1979)
- Yamiutsu Shinzo a.k.a. Heart, Beating in the Dark (1982)
- Kugatsu no Joudan Kurabu Bando a.k.a. The Lonely Hearts Club Band in September (1982)
- Sonogo a.k.a. After That (1984)
- London Calling (1985, short film)
- Tanaka kozue-sei no kageki-ha kyō kara wa binetsu hito (1987)
- Rock yo Shizukani Nagareyo a.k.a. Rock Requiem (1988)
- Yojo no Jidai (1988)
- Yuwakusha a.k.a. The Enchantment (1989)
- Yoru no Sutorenjā Kyōfu a.k.a. Stranger (1991, V-Cinema film)
- Saigo no Drive a.k.a. The Drive (1992)
- Nurse Call (1993)
- Wairusaidu a.k.a. Wild Side (1993, installment of the J・Movie・Wars anthology)
- Romansu a.k.a. Some Kinda Love (1996)
- Doggusu a.k.a. Dogs (1998)
- Shikoku (1999)
- Yawaraka na Hou a.k.a. A Tender Place (2001)
- Yamiutsu Shinzo a.k.a. Heart, Beating in the Dark (2005)
- 8-gatsu no Kurisumasu a.k.a. Christmas in August (2005)
- Kuro-Obi a.k.a. Black Belt (2007)
- Nishi no Majo Ga Shinda a.k.a. The Witch of the West Is Dead (2008)
- Inu to Anata no Monogatari: Inu no Eiga a.k.a. Happy Together: All About My Dog (2011, anthology film)
- Shôjotachi no Rashinban a.k.a. Girls' Compass (2011)
- Where Are Your Lips? (2015)
- Itsuka, Itsuka... Itsumademo a.k.a. How to Find Happiness (2022)

==== Television ====
- The Last Drive: Toyama Nagano High School Girl and Office Lady Serial Kidnapping and Murder Case (1992, TV movie)
- Liou Part 1 Hirakareta Yashin Hen (2001, TV movie)
- Liou Part 2 Sakihokoru Kizuna Hen (2001, TV movie)
- Utenai Keikan (2016)
- Izakaya Fuji (2017)
- MAGI Tensho Keno Shonen Shisetsu a.k.a. MAGI the Tensho Boys' Embassy (2019)
- Miki Kurinikku de Kanpai o a.k.a. Cheers to Miki Clinic (2019)
- Magdala Ya no Mary a.k.a. Mary of Magdalene Restaurant (2025)
