= Shusuke Kaneko =

Japanese film director (born 1955)

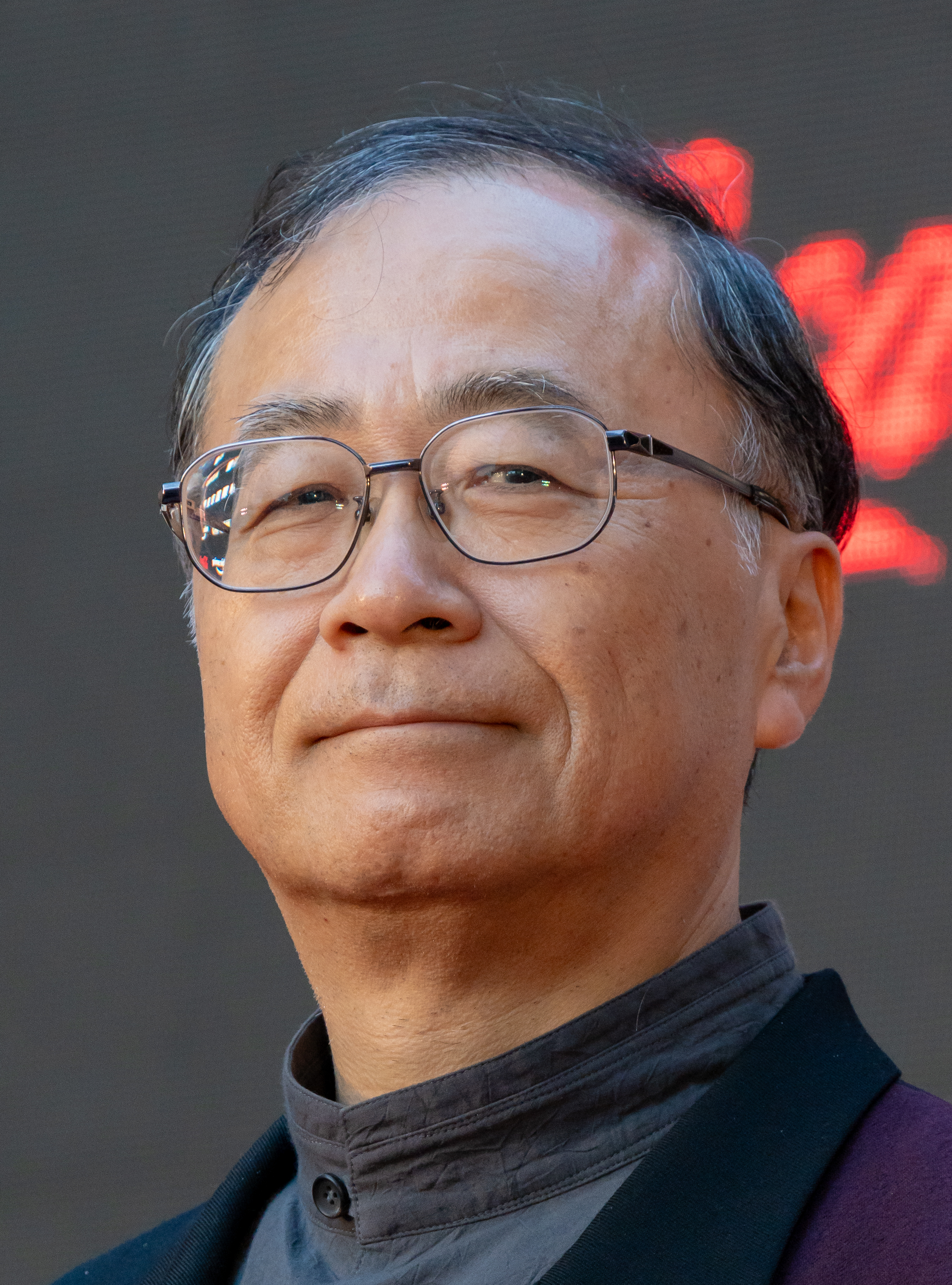
- Kaneko in 2023
- Born: June 8, 1955 (age 71); Shibuya, Tokyo, Japan
- Occupations: Film director; screenwriter
- Years active: 1978–present
- Spouse: Nanako Shindo ()
- Children: 2, including Yurina
- Father: Tokuyoshi Kaneko
- Relatives: Jiro Kaneko (brother)
- Website: www.shusuke-kaneko.com

Shusuke Kaneko (金子 修介, Kaneko Shūsuke; born June 8, 1955) is a Japanese filmmaker. He is best known for revitalizing the kaiju genre with the critically acclaimed Heisei Gamera film trilogy (Gamera: Guardian of the Universe in 1995, Gamera 2: Attack of Legion in 1996, and Gamera 3: Revenge of Iris in 1999) and Godzilla, Mothra and King Ghidorah: Giant Monsters All-Out Attack (2001).

Kaneko has also worked across a wide range of genres throughout his career. He began directing in the early 1980s at Nikkatsu, with several entries in the studio's Roman Porno (pink film) series before transitioning to mainstream cinema. His other notable credits include Summer Vacation 1999 (1988), Necronomicon (1993), Pyrokinesis (2000), the action manga adaptation Azumi 2: Death or Love (2005), and the live-action adaptations of Death Note and its sequel Death Note 2: The Last Name (both 2006).

== Life and career ==
Kaneko was born on June 8, 1955, in the Hatsudai district of Shibuya, Tokyo. According to the biography on his official website Kaneko was interested in science fiction, particularly Godzilla and Gamera films, from a young age. He became involved in amateur film making in his teen years, but majored in education when he attended Tokyo Gakugei University. After graduation, he found a job at the major Japanese movie studio Nikkatsu. By 1982 he was a screenwriter and assistant director for Nikkatsu's Roman Porno film series.

Kaneko made his debut as a director with Nikkatsu in February 1984 with Kōichirō Uno's Wet and Swinging, part of a long-running Nikkatsu series based on the works of erotic novelist Kōichirō Uno. That work along with two other Roman Porno films he directed for Nikkatsu that year, OL Yurizoku 19-sai (OL百合族・19才) and Eve-chan-no hime (イヴちゃんの姫), won him the Best New Director award at the 6th Yokohama Film Festival. The next year, his manga-based April 1985 movie for Nikkatsu, Minna Agechau, took the award as the 9th Best Film of the year at the 7th Yokohama Film Festival. In July 1986, still at Nikkatsu, he directed Mischievous Lolita: Attacking the Virgin From Behind (いたずらロリータ 後からバージン, Itazura Lolita: Ushirokara virgin), which despite its strange title, was a fantasy about a sex-doll coming to life as a woman. Kaneko's final film for Nikkatsu was the appropriately named Last Cabaret, the second to last of the studio's Roman Porno series. The film, released in April 1988, about a cabaret forced to close has been taken as a metaphor for the demise of the studio itself.

The year 1988 marked a watershed in Kaneko's career as a director. At the 10th Yokohama Film Festival, he was given the Best Director award for his two films of 1988, the Roman Porno Last Cabaret for Nikkatsu and Summer Vacation 1999, a mainstream film for the Shochiku studio. Nikkatsu ceased their Roman Porno film line that year and filed for bankruptcy a few years later and Kaneko moved full-time into mainstream film.

During the mid-to-late 1990s, Kaneko received widespread acclaim and recognition for directing the kaiju films Gamera: Guardian of the Universe (1995), Gamera 2: Attack of Legion (1996), and Gamera 3: Revenge of Iris (1999). The following decade, he directed Godzilla, Mothra and King Ghidorah: Giant Monsters All-Out Attack (2001), which is now regarded as one of the greatest Godzilla films ever made.

== Filmography ==
Year	Title	Director	Writer	Notes
1984	Kōichirō Uno's Wet and Swinging	Yes	No	
1985	Minna Agechau	Yes	No	
1988	Last Cabaret	Yes	No	
1988	Summer Vacation 1999	Yes	No	
1989	Who Do I Choose?	Yes	Yes	
1990	Hong Kong Paradise	Yes	Yes	
1991	My Soul Is Slashed	Yes	Yes	
1991	No Worries on the Recruit Front	Yes	Yes	
1993	Graduation Journey: I Came from Japan	Yes	No	
1993	Necronomicon	Yes	No	Segment "The Cold"
1994	It's a Summer Vacation Everyday	Yes	No	
1995	Gamera: Guardian of the Universe	Yes	No	
1996	Gamera 2: Attack of Legion	Yes	No	
1997	Haunted School 3	Yes	No	
1999	Gamera 3: Revenge of Iris	Yes	Yes	
2000	Pyrokinesis	Yes	No	
2001	Godzilla, Mothra and King Ghidorah: Giant Monsters All-Out Attack	Yes	Yes	
2005	Azumi 2: Death or Love	Yes	No	
2006	Death Note	Yes	No	
2006	God's Left Hand, Devil's Right Hand	Yes	No	
2006	Death Note 2: The Last Name	Yes	Yes	
2009	Pride	Yes	No	
2011	Messiah	Yes	No	
2012	The Centenarian Clock	Yes	No	
2013	The Sacrifice Dilemma	Yes	No	
2013	Jellyfish	Yes	No	
2014	Danger Dolls	Yes	No	
2016	Scanner	Yes	No	
2017	Linking Love	Yes	No	
2017	Matchmaking Cruise	Yes	No	
2018	Xi Bo Li Ya feng yun	Yes	No	
2021	Nobutora	Yes	No	
2021	Iké Boys	No	No	Actor (Japanese producer)
2022	When the Rain Falls	Yes	No	
2024	Gold Boy	Yes	No	
2026	2126, Looking for the Sea's Star	Yes	No	

Assistant director

- From Orion's Testimony: Formula for Murder (1978)
- Rape and Death of a Housewife (1978)
- Koko dai panikku (1978)
- Female Teacher Hunting (1982)
- Gigolo: A Docu-Drama (1982)
- Ecstasy Sisters (1982)
- Oh! Takarazuka (1982)
- The Family Game (1983)
- Girl Rape Case: Red Shoes (1983)
- Madam Scandal - Final Scandal: Madam Likes It Hard (1983)
- Main Theme (1984)
