= List of Japanese films of 1996 =

== Highest-grossing films ==
Rank	Title	Gross
1	Godzilla vs. Destoroyah	¥2.00 billion
2	Shall We Dance?	¥1.60 billion
2	Doraemon: Nobita and the Galaxy Super-express	¥1.60 billion
2	Gakkō no Kaidan 2	¥1.60 billion
5	Supermarket Woman	¥1.50 billion

== List of films ==
A list of films released in Japan in 1996 (see 1996 in film).

Title	Director	Cast	Genre	Notes
Adultery Diary: One More Time While I'm Still Wet	Toshiki Satō	Hotaru Hazuki	Pink	Best Film, Best Actress, Best Screenplay: Pink Grand Prix
Atashi wa juice	Toshiki Satō	Naomi Akimoto, Natsuki Ozawa, Shingo Tsurumi		
Boys Be Ambitious	Kazuyuki Izutsu	Takashi Okamura, Hiroyuki Yabe		
Ohranger vs. Kakuranger	Shōhei Tōjō	Masaru Shishido, Kunio Masaoka, Masashi Gōda	Tokusatsu	Direct-to-video crossover
Crayon Shin-chan: Adventure in Henderland	Mitsuru Hongō		—N/a	Animated feature
Don't Look Up	Hideo Nakata	Yūrei Yanagi, Yasuyo Shirashima, Kei Ishibashi	Horror	
Doraemon: Nobita and the Galaxy Super-express	Tsutomu Shibayama		—N/a	Animated feature
Dorami & the Doraemons - Seven Strange Tales of the Robot School	Yoshitomo Yonetani		—N/a	Animated short
Dragon Ball: The Path to Power	Shigeyasu Yamauchi	Masako Nozawa, Hiromi Tsuru, Naoki Tatsuta	Anime	Part of the Dragon Ball series; last theatrical film in the series until Dragon Ball Z: Battle of Gods in 2013
Emperor Tomato Ketchup	Shūji Terayama	Goro Abashiri, Tarō Apollo, Shiro Demaemochi		
Gakko II	Yoji Yamada	Toshiyuki Nishida, Hidetaka Yoshioka, Masatoshi Nagase		
Gakkō no Kaidan 2	Hideyuki Hirayama	Hironobu Nomura, Naomi Nishida, Kyōko Kishida	Horror	Part of the Gakkō no Kaidan series
Gamera 2: Attack of Legion	Shusuke Kaneko	Shinobu Nakayama, Ai Maeda, Toshiyuki Nagashima	—N/a	
Heisei Harenchi Gakuen	Hiroyuki Muramatsu	Senna Matsuda, Yoshiyuki Yamaguchi, Rika Harada		Based on a manga
Haru	Yoshimitsu Morita	Masaaki Uchino, Eri Fukatsu, Kazufumi Miyazawa	Comedy-drama, romance	
Kids Return	Takeshi Kitano	Masanobu Andō, Ken Kaneko, Leo Morimoto		
Lupin III: Dead or Alive	Monkey Punch		—N/a	Animated feature
Mari's Prey	Keiichirō Yoshida	Makiko Kuno, Takeshi Yamato, Kenichi Endō	Erotic thriller	
Naked Blood	Hisayasu Satō	Misa Aika, Yumika Hayashi, Mika Kirihara	Horror	
Neighborhood Story	Atsuji Shimizu		Anime	Based on a manga
Organ	Kei Fujiwara	Kei Fujiwara, Kimihiko Hasegawa, Yosiaki Maekawa	Horror	
Picnic	Shunji Iwai	Chara, Tadanobu Asano, Koichi Hashizume		
Rebirth of Mothra	Okihiro Yoneda	Megumi Kobayashi, Sayaka Yamaguchi, Aki Hano	—N/a	
Revive! Ultraman	Masahiro Tsuburaya	Susumu Kurobe, Masanari Nihei, Akiji Kobayashi	Tokusatsu	Part of the Ultra Series
Shall We Dance?	Masayuki Suo	Kōji Yakusho, Tamiyo Kusakari, Naoto Takenaka	Comedy-drama	
SM Teacher: Tied Up by Students	Yutaka Ikejima	Runa Hayama, Kazuhiro Sano	Pink	
Supermarket Woman	Juzo Itami	Nobuko Miyamoto, Masahiko Tsugawa, Ryunosuke Kaneda	Comedy	
Swallowtail Butterfly	Shunji Iwai	Hiroshi Mikami, Chara, Ayumi Ito		Entered into the 20th Moscow International Film Festival
Village of Dreams	Yōichi Higashi	Mieko Harada, Keigo Matsuyama, Shogo Matsuyama		Entered into the 46th Berlin International Film Festival
The Wart	Shinji Imaoka	Yōta Kawase, Maako Mizuno, Yumika Hayashi	Pink	
The Way to Fight	Takashi Miike	Takeshi Caesar, Ryoko Imamura, Kazuki Kitamura		Direct-to-video
Women at a Secret Meeting: From Wives to Coeds	Sachio Kitazawa	Yūki Morishita, Shun'ichi Yajima, Kyōsuke Sasaki	Pink	
XX: Beautiful Prey	Toshiharu Ikeda	Kei Marimura, Makiko Watanabe, Ren Ōsugi	Erotic thriller	

== See also ==
- 1996 in Japan
- 1996 in Japanese television
