= 6th Yokohama Film Festival =

1985 Japanese film festival edition

- Location: Kanagawa Prefectural Music Hall, Yokohama, Kanagawa, Japan
- Founded: 1980
- Festival date: 3 February 1985

The 6th Yokohama Film Festival (第6回ヨコハマ映画祭) was held on 3 February 1985 in Kanagawa Prefectural Music Hall, Yokohama, Kanagawa, Japan.

== Awards ==
- Best Film: Mahjong hōrōki
- Best Actor: Takeshi Kaga – Mahjong hōrōki
- Best Actress: Mari Shirato – Mermaid Legend
- Best New Actress:
  - Yasuko Tomita – Aiko 16 sai
  - Youki Kudoh – The Crazy Family
  - Kimiko Yoshimiya – Renzoku Satsujinki: Reiketsu
- Best Supporting Actor: Kaku Takashina – Mahjong hōrōki
- Best Supporting Actress:
  - Kin Sugai – The Funeral
  - Etsuko Shihomi – Shanghai Rhapsody
- Best Director: Toshiharu Ikeda – Mermaid Legend
- Best New Director: Shūsuke Kaneko – Kōichirō Uno's Wet and Swinging, OL Yurizoku 19-sai, Eve-chan-no hime
- Best Screenplay: Juzo Itami – The Funeral
- Best Cinematography: Yonezo Maeda – The Funeral, Mermaid Legend, Deaths in Tokimeki, Main Theme
- Special Prize:
  - Norifumi Suzuki (Career)
  - Sayuri Yoshinaga (Career)

== Best 10 ==
1. Mahjong hōrōki
2. The Funeral
3. Nausicaä of the Valley of the Wind
4. Mermaid Legend
5. Chinpira
6. MacArthur's Children
7. Farewell to the Ark
8. The Crazy Family
9. Deaths in Tokimeki
10. Sukanpin Walk

runner-up: Urusei Yatsura 2: Beautiful Dreamer
