= Hitomi Kobayashi =

Japanese AV idol (born 1965)

- 小林ひとみ
- Born: Yukari Ishii; September 2, 1965 (age 61); Tokyo, Japan
- Other name: Queen of AV
- Height: 1.51 m (4 ft 11 in)
- Spouse: Toshifumi Yuzawa (m. 1987)

Hitomi Kobayashi (Japanese: 小林ひとみ, Hepburn: Kobayashi Hitomi) is an important early Japanese AV idol. One of the founding figures of the Japanese adult video (AV), she has been called indispensable to any discussion of the AV. Mainichi Shimbun calls her "one of the icons of Japanese adult cinema history." Her unprecedented popularity in the mid-1980s, the early days of the Japanese AV, earned her the title "Queen of AV". According to an adult entertainment reporter for Shukan Shincho, "She laid the foundations for the golden age of adult video".

After making her debut as a non-pornographic photobook and "image video" model, Kobayashi entered the AV field in 1986. Because of her rapid popularity, Nikkatsu, Japan's leading producer of softcore pornography at the time, hired her to appear in theatrical films in 1987. After marriage and a semi-retirement beginning in 1989, Kobayashi fully returned to the AV industry in 1998. She announced her retirement in 2003 with a big-budget, though controversial, two-volume farewell adult video.

== Life and career ==
=== Early life ===
According to her official profile, Hitomi Kobayashi was born Yukari Ishii (石井ゆかり, Ishii Yukari) in Tokyo on September 2, 1965. However, in an interview in the Weekly Post (週刊ポスト) just before her retirement in 2003, she confessed to have actually been born in 1963. Her ambition since childhood was to be an actress. She attended acting school, and registered with a talent agency. Kobayashi was not particularly sexually precocious, claiming at the time of her AV debut, "I lost my virginity at 18, which is probably a bit late, and I wasn't very experienced with men."

This relative sexual conservatism extended into her AV career. The sex scenes in all but her final video were simulated. Even at the end of her AV career, Kobayashi's attitude towards sex remained modest. Interviewed at the time of her retirement, Kobayashi said, "I love sex. But, just because I'm an AV actress, it doesn't mean I'm brim-filled with experience. I've done orgy movies, and lesbian scenes and loads of abnormal stuff, but the world of videos isn't a real world. My normal life is really plain. I couldn't imagine having sex anywhere other than in bed and taking part in an orgy would be unthinkable. I'm happy enough with just the missionary position."

Kobayashi made her debut using the stage name Kaori Matsumoto (松本かおり, Matsumoto Kaori) in May 1986 in a photobook and "image video" both titled Pounding: 19-year-old Kaori (ときめき・かおり19歳, Tokimeki: Kaori Jukyusai). However, in spite of these two releases, she believed her career was going nowhere.

=== AV debut ===
Not long after her debut in the non-pornographic media, Kobayashi was presented with a new opportunity. She says, "I got this offer to do a movie called Kinjirareta Kankei (Forbidden Relationship) (for the VIP studio). I was told there were nude and love scenes, but nothing steamier than any ordinary movie." Shocked when she found out this was actually an adult video, she was at first reluctant. After a long discussion with her agent she finally agreed to perform in the video only if the sex was simulated. She changed her stage name to Hitomi Kobayashi for the video which was a surprise success, selling 50,000 copies. Her amazing popularity quickly made her the leading AV actress of the mid-1980s, and, not long after her debut, she had earned the title "AV Queen."

Japan's censorship laws prevent the display of sexual organs, allowing Kobayashi to maintain her insistence on performing only simulated sex on camera throughout her AV career. Kobayashi considered her AV performances to be another form of acting and came up with various techniques for appearing to have actual sex. For example, she says, "I used to get the directors to tickle my feet and then tried not to laugh so it looked as though I was climaxing."

Her career was put in danger when an uncensored bootleg copy of one of her videos circulated. When it could be plainly seen that the "AV Queen" was not performing real sex, Kobayashi feared that her fans would abandon her. These fears proved to be groundless, however, and her popularity continued.

=== Theatrical career ===
By 1987, Kobayashi's popularity had already earned her the title "Queen of AV". Nikkatsu, which had been the leader of Japanese theatrical pornography since the inception of its Roman Porno series in 1971, was rapidly losing its audience to the AV industry. Though the studio had publicly condemned the AVs for years, in an attempt to lure some of Kobayashi's AV fans into the theater, Nikkatsu hired the AV Queen to star in her own series of films. The first of these, Hitomi Kobayashi's Secret Pleasure (小林ひとみ 奥戯快感 艶, Kobayashi Hitomi ougi kaikan: tsuya) was released in January 1987. Thomas and Yuko Mihara Weisser, in their Japanese Cinema Encyclopedia: The Sex Films, judge the film as "little more than a Playboy or Penthouse lingerie special."

The second, Hitomi Kobayashi's Heavy Petting (ハード・ペッティング, Hard Petting), released in March 1987, was part of Nikkatsu's new "Roman X" line, which was purportedly more "hardcore" than the standard Roman Porno. However, Japan's practice of censorship by fogging out genitals made this move into "hardcore" rather pointless, since, as Donald Richie put it in his pioneering essay on the Pink film, "none of the working parts are ever shown." Both of these first two films were judged little more than AVs on film, and were not popular with either AV fans or the critics, who preferred Nikkatsu's older Roman Porno style.

The third in this series, Hitomi Kobayashi's Young Girl Story (小林ひとみの令嬢物語, Kobayashi Hitomi no reijo monogatari) (released December 19, 1987), came closest to the old Nikkatsu style, in that it had some semblance of a plot, but by now it was too late for the studio. It would cease production of Roman Porno in 1988, and declare bankruptcy in 1993. At the height of her popularity, in 1987, Kobayashi married Toshifumi Yuzawa, who would later become the president of Kobayashi's talent agency. Kobayashi put her AV performances on hold for a few years beginning in 1989 to concentrate on family matters. During this period, she never officially retired, never completely ceased appearing in AVs, and worked occasionally as a stripper. In 1988 she had a major role in the mainstream Evil Dead Trap (死霊の罠, Shiryo no wana). Allmovie describes the film as a "sickening but riveting slasher," and author and film critic Patrick Galloway calls the film, "…nothing short of a multicultural terror tour de force, featuring gruesome, brilliantly rendered sound and imagery that will stay with you to your last dying gasp." Written by Takashi Ishii and directed by Toshiharu Ikeda, the film inspired two sequels. Japan Home Video, which financed the film, wished to showcase Kobayashi, their top AV star at the time, as the star of the film. Director Ikeda, unsure of Kobayashi's acting abilities, instead put Miyuki Ono in the lead role of Nami, and gave Kobabayashi the supporting role of Rei. The near adult-video style sex scenes that Kobayashi performs in the film have been criticized by horror film purists as the element that prevents the film from attaining genre classic status. Galloway, however, points out that Evil Dead Trap is not pure horror, but a genre-transcending film. About the sex scenes, Galloway comments, "Ikeda handles the steamy segments like a pro, coming as he did from Nikkatsu, where he honed his craft making the studio's signature roman porno (romantic pornography). In 1996 and 1997, Hitomi Kobayashi starred in two films for pioneering pink film director Satoru Kobayashi, who was the director of Flesh Market (1962) – the first pink film. In 1997, she played the somewhat autobiographical role of fictional AV actress Mizuki Mahoro in the 1997 V-cinema film Destroying Mosaic (モザイク崩し). Kobayashi's official return to the AV industry was in the November 1998 video Love Bond or Immoral Bonds.

=== Later career ===
Over ten years after her debut, Kobayashi was by now a "mature woman" model, and her videos began to reflect the new niche for mature models in AVs which began to appear in the mid-1990s.

Kobayashi teamed up with Japan's first hardcore pornographic actress, Kyoko Aizome, in the February 2001 theatrical release, Kyoko Aizome vs. Hitomi Kobayashi: Sexual Excitement Competition (愛染恭子ＶＳ小林ひとみ 発情くらべ). Aizome both starred in and directed the film, which was released by Nikkatsu's post-Roman porn distributor of theatrical pornography, Excess films. The same year, Kobayashi and her husband opened a nightclub in Roppongi.

=== Hitomi Kobayashi FINAL ===
In an industry in which the average career spans only a year and produces five to ten videos, by 2003, Kobayashi had worked in the AV field for over a decade and a half and appeared in about 70 films. The 39 AVs in which she had starred had sold over 600,000 copies, earning about 6 billion yen ($60 million). Reflecting on her Adult Video career at this time, Kobayashi commented, "I'm delighted to have led a career where I would be elevated to being called 'AV Queen,' as well as to have lasted in the business until I turned 40."

Wishing to retire on a high-note, Kobayashi and her manager/husband advertised for investors in one last, 2-volume, two-and-a-half-hour AV opus. Kobayashi sought 35 investors who would contribute 500,000 yen ($5,000) each, for the privilege of a dinner with Kobayashi, having their names listed in the video's credits, and an exclusive viewing of the video. The video was released in two volumes as Hitomi Kobayashi FINAL – Disc1 (December 19, 2003) and Disc2 (December 31, 2003).

Controversy followed in the wake of the release when some of the investors in the video reported they were promised dividends from their investment, but had received none. It was claimed that Kobayashi had got over 50 investors for the project, but that her husband had used the money to pay personal debt and for recreational activities unrelated to the film. Insufficient communication with the investors, the shutting down of the film's website, the company repeatedly changing its name, and changing reports on whether or not the film made a profit added to investor complaints. In 2004, Kobayashi was reported working as a hostess at her nightclub in Roppongi.

== Selected theatrical releases ==
- Evil Dead Trap (死霊の罠, Shiryo no wana) (May 14, 1988)

== Sources ==
- Adachi, Noriyuki (1992). アダルトな人びと (Adaruto na Hitobito/"Adult" People (in Japanese). Tokyo: Kodansha. pp. 83, 96–97. ISBN 4-06-205546-5.
- "Discography (Hitomi Kobayashi)" (in Japanese). xcity.jp/CITY_ORG/classics. Archived from the original on September 30, 2007.
- "HITOMI KOBAYASHI". citwf.com.
- "Kobayashi Hitomi" (in Japanese). Filmography at Japanese Movie Database.
- "Kobayashi Hitomi" (in Japanese). i-dic.dorachan.com 'Web I-dic' (Idol Dictionary). Archived from the original on October 6, 2007.
- "Kobayashi Hitomi – Moodyz profile and filmography" (in Japanese). Moodyz. Archived from the original on March 12, 2008.
- Weisser, Thomas; Yuko Mihara Weisser (1998). Japanese Cinema Encyclopedia: The Sex Films. Miami: Vital Books: Asian Cult Cinema Publications. pp. 221–222. ISBN 1-889288-52-7.
