= The Black Angel =

The Black Angel or Black Angel may refer to:

== Films ==
- The Black Angel (1942 film), a Mexican film by Juan Bustillo Oro
- Black Angel (1946 film), an American film noir
- Black Angel (1978 film), an action-thriller film
- Black Angel (1980 film), a short film
- Black Angel, an alternative title for Arabella Black Angel, a 1989 Italian film
- The Black Angel, English title of Kuro no tenshi Vol. 1 (1997) and Kuro no tenshi Vol. 2 (1999), by Takashi Ishii

== Music ==
- Black Angel (album), a 1998 album by British soul singer Mica Paris
- The Black Angel (album), a 1970 album by Freddie Hubbard
- "Black Angel", a song on the 1979 album TRB Two by Tom Robinson

== Literature ==
- The Black Angel (novel), a 1943 novel by Cornell Woolrich
- The Black Angel, a 2005 novel by John Connolly

== Statues ==
- Black Angel, a 1913 statue in Oakland Cemetery
- Ruth Anne Dodge Memorial, also known as the Black Angel, a sculpture in Council Bluffs, Iowa

== People ==
- Robledo Puch (born 1952), also known as The Black Angel, Argentine serial killer

== See also ==
- Black Angels (disambiguation)
