= Reiko Kataoka =

Japanese actress (born 1971)

- Born: December 20, 1971 (age 54); Ehime, Japan
- Occupation: Actress
- Years active: 1991–present

Reiko Kataoka (片岡 礼子, Kataoka Reiko; born December 20, 1971) is a Japanese actress. She won the award for best actress at the 45th Blue Ribbon Awards for Hush!.

== Filmography ==
=== Film ===
- A Touch of Fever (1993)
- New Love in Tokyo (1994)
- Kamikaze Taxi (1995)
- Two Punks (1996)
- Gonin 2 (1996)
- Peking Man (1997)
- Kuro no tenshi Vol. 1 (1998)
- Kuro no tenshi Vol. 2 (1999)
- Battle Royale (2000) Extended Cut
- Hush! (2001)
- All Around Us (2008)
- Tada's Do-It-All House (2011)
- Hakodate Coffee (2016)
- Homecoming (2017)
- Enokida Trading Post (2018)
- Liverleaf (2018)
- My Friend "A" (2018)
- Junpei, Think Again (2018)
- Lost in Ramen (2018)
- Just Only Love (2019)
- The Promised Land (2019)
- Family of Strangers (2019)
- Hell Girl (2019)
- Life: Untitled (2019)
- Step (2020)
- Shape of Red (2020)
- Tonkatsu DJ Agetarō (2020)
- Intolerance (2021), Midori Nakayama
- The Woman of S.R.I. The Movie (2021)
- Ring Wandering (2022)
- Grown-ups (2022)
- It's All My Fault (2022), Nakagawa
- No Place to Go (2022), Koizumi
- Goodbye Cruel World (2022)
- Amnesiac Love (2022)
- Twilight Cinema Blues (2023)
- Thorns of Beauty (2023)
- The Sound of an Empty Hole in My Heart (2023), Makoto Dōmoto
- Tsugaru Lacquer Girl (2023)
- #Mito (2023), lawyer Matsumoto
- Corpo a Corpo (2023)
- Family (2023)
- The Beast of Comedy (2024)
- Matched (2024), Michiko
- Voice (2024)
- The Quilt (2024), Madoka Takenaka
- Welcome to the Village (2025)
- Strangers in Kyoto (2025), Azusa Takeda
- True Beauty: Before (2025)
- True Beauty: After (2025)
- Kono Basho (2025)
- Fiamma (2025)
- Can't Cry with Your Face (2025), Hazuki Sakahira
- The Final Piece (2025)
- Between Two Lovers (2026), Ritsuko Sakoda
- Diamonds in the Sand (2027)

=== TV series ===
- Kamen Rider Hibiki (2005), Shuki
- Midnight Diner: Tokyo Stories (2016)
- Daishō (2016)
- The Courage to be Disliked (2017)
- May I Blackmail You? (2017)
- Gannibal (2022), Osamu Kano's wife (ep. 4)
- The Queen of Villains (2024), Doctor (ep. 5)
- Captured Broadcasting Station (2025), Seira Okino
