= Jinpachi Nezu =

Japanese actor (1947–2016)

- Born: Tōru Nezu; 1 December 1947; Tsuru, Yamanashi, Japan
- Died: 29 December 2016 (aged 69); Tokyo, Japan
- Occupation: Actor
- Years active: 1974-2010, 2015

Jinpachi Nezu (根津 甚八, Nezu Jinpachi; 1 December 1947 – 29 December 2016) was a Japanese actor. He appeared in more than 50 films and television shows between 1974 and 2010. He starred in the 1982 film Farewell to the Land, which was entered into the 32nd Berlin International Film Festival.

He died on 29 December 2016 in Tokyo of pneumonia. He had retired from acting after getting into a car accident and experiencing subsequent health problems, though he came out of retirement to reprise the character of Hizu in Gonin Saga at director Takashi Ishii's request. The film would be his last.

== Partial filmography ==
=== Film ===
- Nureta sai no me (1974)
- Genkai-nada (1976) - Yakuzu
- Sono go no jingi naki tatakai (1979) - Toshio Aiba
- Kagemusha (1980) - Sohachiro Tsuchiya
- Station (1981) - Goro Yoshimatsu
- Farewell to the Land (1982) - Yukio Yamazawa
- Kono ko no nanatsu no oiwai ni (1982) - Sudo
- Kidonappu burûsu (1982) - Drunk
- Daijôbu, mai furendo (1983) - Doctor
- Ran (1985) - Jiro
- Angel's Egg (1985) - Boy (voice)
- Yoshiwara enjô (1987) - Shinsuke Furushima
- Kono aino monogatari (1987) - Murasame
- The Man Who Assassinated Ryoma (1987) - Sakamoto Ryōma
- Nikutai no mon (1988)
- 226 (1989) - Tsukasa Kono
- Raffles Hotel (1989) - Toshimichi Kariya
- Tasmania Story (1990) - Haruo Tozuki
- Patlabor 2: The Movie (1993) - Yukihito Tsuge (voice)
- Nûdo no yoru (1993) - Kozo Yukikata
- Tenshi no harawata: Akai senkô (1994) - Muraki
- Yoru ga mata kuru (1994) - Namekata Kozo
- Gonin (1995) - Kaname Hizu
- Ruby Fruit (1995) - Hisao Kagami
- Sayonara Nippon! (1995)
- Gennsou Andalusia (1996)
- Natsu jikan no otonatachi (1996) - Man in TV Drama
- Fukigen na kajitsu (1977) - Osamu Nomura
- Rabu retâ (1998) - Satake
- Kuro no tenshi Vol. 1 (1998) - Goro Nogi
- Tadon to chikuwa (1998) - Anzai
- Nobody (1999)
- Saraba gokudo dead beat (1999)
- Jubaku: Spellbound (1999) - Kohei Nakayama
- Owls' Castle (1999) - Hattori Hanzo
- Shisha no gakuensai (2000) - Shozo Yuki
- Senrigan (2000)
- Red Shadow (2001) - Gensai
- Kikuchi-jô monogatari - sakimori-tachi no uta (2001) - Frontier guard
- The Man In White (2003)
- Doragon heddo (2003) - Matsuo
- The Man in White Part 2: Requiem for the Lion (2003)
- Runin: Banished (2004) - Inaba
- Gonin Saga (2015) - Kaname Hizu

=== Television ===
- Zatōichi: The Palanquin Wars Of Tempo Period (1978–1979)
- Ōgon no Hibi (1978) - Ishikawa Goemon
- Shishi no Jidai (1980) - Itō Hirobumi
- Taiheiki (1991) - Nitta Yoshisada
- Honmamon (2001–2002) - Ichiro Yamanaka
