= Megumi Yokoyama =

Megumi Yokoyama may refer to:

- Megumi Yokoyama (actress) (横山 めぐみ, born 1969), Japanese actress
- Megumi Yokoyama (badminton) (横山 めぐみ, born 1990), Japanese badminton player
