= Evil Dead Trap =

- Theatrical release poster
- Directed by: Toshiharu Ikeda
- Written by: Takashi Ishii
- Produced by: Satoshi Jinno; Michio Ôtsuka
- Starring: Miyuki Ono; Yuji Honma; Aya Katsuragi; Eriko Nakagawa; Hitomi Kobayashi; Masahiko Abe
- Cinematography: Masaki Tamura
- Music by: Tomohiko Kira
- Production companies: Director's Company; Japan Home Video
- Distributed by: Joy Pack Film
- Release date: 14 May 1988
- Running time: 105 minutes
- Country: Japan
- Language: Japanese

Evil Dead Trap (Japanese: 死霊の罠, romanized: Shiryō no wana, lit. 'Trap of the Dead Spirits') is a 1988 Japanese supernatural slasher film directed by Toshiharu Ikeda and produced by Japan Home Video. The film stars Miyuki Ono, Yuji Honma, Aya Katsuragi, Eriko Nakagawa, Hitomi Kobayashi and Masahiko Abe, follow a television team enters an abandoned building to track down the source of a mysterious videotape before they are pursued by something unseen.

== Plot ==
Late-night TV show host Nami asks her viewers to send in home movies; she receives a snuff film shot at a disused military base. The film ends with a superimposed image of herself, which disturbs her. Nami and her production crew—Rie, Mako, Rei, and Kondo—are granted permission by their studio to investigate and they believe their discoveries would help them regain their lost viewership.

When the crew arrives, the base appears empty and they split up to explore. Nami encounters a mysterious man, Daisuke, who advises her to leave. Rei and Kondo have sex in an abandoned machine shop. Rei then wanders off and discovers the corpse of the woman from the snuff film. A masked killer suddenly kills her by impaling her with several poles.

Unaware of Rei's murder, Kondo meets Nami and Rie, where Nami admits her curiosity in knowing more about the killer. Mako alerts the rest of the crew about the building where the snuff film was filmed in. They enter and see Rei's corpse being suspended on a ropeway. The crew panicks and are trapped after their escape routes are destroyed by an unseen force. Rie, however, manages to escape but is ambushed by the boyfriend of the snuff film's victim, who was also held prisoner for several days. He reveals that the killer promised him freedom if he killed any trespassers and that the killer is "two in one". The man rapes and suffocates Rie but the killer shoots him with a bladed object before choking Rie with a garrote, killing them both.

Meanwhile, Nami makes her way to the rooftop and meets Daisuke. Daisuke reveals Kondo's death, who was decapitated off-screen, and tells Nami that he used to live with his brother, Hideki, at the base. Daisuke senses Hideki's presence and tries to confront him but is attacked by a crossbow bolt. Nami goes after him but stumbles upon several TV sets, where Mako pleads for help. Nami is guided to her whereabouts but accidentally triggers a booby trap, killing Mako.

Daisuke gives Nami his gun and she makes her way to the killer's hideout. Nami discovers that the killer is Daisuke, who apparently suffers from split personality disorder and is guided to kill by Hideki, his other personality. Daisuke confesses that "they" wanted to meet Nami, who is seen as their "mother", and allows her to shoot him, having grown weary of killing under Hideki's orders. Suddenly, Hideki, who is revealed to be a parasitic twin with psychokinetic powers, sets the room on fire and bursts out of Daisuke's chest. Hideki wraps his umbilical cord around Nami's chest but Daisuke saves her by stabbing Hideki, which also kills him. Daisuke's corpse comes alive but Nami stabs him with a glass shard, causing him to fall out of a window to his death.

Recovering in the hospital, Nami is met by a detective, who is skeptical of Hideki's existence. Later, Nami airs a tribute to her deceased colleagues to great acclaim. Nami receives a gift from an unknown sender, which is revealed to be Daisuke's cigarette lighter. Hideki, who has found a new vessel, bursts out of Nami's body and calls her "Mommy".

== Cast ==
- Miyuki Ono as Nami Tsuchiya
- Yuji Honma as Daisuke Muraki
- Aya Katsuragi as Mako Abe
- Eriko Nakagawa as Rie Kawamura
- Hitomi Kobayashi as Rei Sugiura
- Masahiko Abe as Akio Kondo
- Shinsuke Shimada as Harada
- Hiroshi Shimizu as the captive man
- Noboru Mitani as the detective
- Mari Shimizu as the voice of Hideki
- Terumi Niki as the voice of Hideki's mother
- Kyōko Hashimoto

== Production ==
Special makeup effects were handled by Shinichi Wakasa, who subsequently worked on the Godzilla film series as a creature and suit designer.

Evil Dead Trap was financed by video production company Japan Home Video (JHV) and produced by Director's Company, a Japanese filmmaking collective. The film reunited director Toshiharu Ikeda and screenwriter Takashi Ishii, who had previously collaborated on Angel Guts: Red Classroom (1981) and Scent of a Spell (1985). Japan's National Film Archive has identified the use of water imagery as a recurring stylistic element in the three films, highlighting its prominence alongside the violent imagery of Evil Dead Trap.

The film's cinematography was handled by Masaki Tamura, with production design by Tomoyuki Maruo and Yuji Hayashida. Shinichi Wakasa was responsible for special makeup effects, while Hidekazu Kishiura handled mechanical special effects, including the film's elaborate practical violence. The music was composed by Tomohiko Kira, later known as a member of the rock band Zabadak. His recurring theme was highlighted by the National Film Archive, which also noted that Kira subsequently collaborated with Ikeda on two further films.

Hitomi Kobayashi who plays the supporting role of Rei Sugiura was a top star for Japan Home Video (JHV) under their adult video (AV) label Alice Japan. JHV financed the film as a vehicle for Kobayashi. However, director Toshiharu Ikeda, unsure of Kobayashi's acting ability, instead put Miyuki Ono in the starring role.

== Release ==
Evil Dead Trap was released theatrically in Japan as 死霊の罠 (Shiryō no wana) on 14 May 1988. The film was originally screened as part of a double bill with Door, another horror production from Director's Company. It was later released in Japan on VHS on 25 September 1988 and as a DVD on 23 June 2000.

On 7 November 2000, the film was released on DVD in the United States by Synapse Films. The release included the original theatrical trailer, and audio commentary by director Ikeda and special effects manager Shinichi Wakasa. In the United Kingdom, a 2002 home-video release was cut by the British Board of Film Classification, which required the removal of two close-up shots involving sexualised knife violence. The film was subsequently classified again for home entertainment in 2024 and released on Blu-ray in the United Kingdom by 88 Films.

In Japan, a crowdfunding campaign was launched in 2019 to produce Blu-ray editions of both Evil Dead Trap and Evil Dead Trap 2: Hideki. The campaign raised ¥4,211,681 from 325 backers, exceeding its ¥3 million goal. Blu-ray box sets were distributed to backers in December 2019, followed by a general Japanese release of both films on 25 September 2020 through Japan Home Video and Maxam. To celebrate the Japanese Blu-ray release, a special late-night screening of Evil Dead Trap was scheduled for 18 September 2020 at Shin-Bungeiza in Ikebukuro, Tokyo, featuring a guest appearance by lead actress Miyuki Ono for a talk show.

== Reception ==
Critical responses to Evil Dead Trap were mixed, with reviewers praising its cinematography, practical effects and combination of Japanese slasher horror with elements of Italian giallo cinema, while criticizing aspects of its pacing and final act.

Jon Condit from Dread Central rated the film a score of three out of five, highlighting the soundtrack, story, and cinematography as being reminiscent of Dario Argento's giallo films. While calling the film "fun and well crafted", Condit criticized the film's weak ending. Niina Doherty of HorrorNews.net also criticized the film's ending while commending the cinematography, special effects, and mixture of elements from slasher and giallo films. Empire's Mark Dinning gave the film four out of five stars, praising the film's cinematography, gore effects, and style, calling it, "an effective and bloody slasher let down only by its last act". In their book Japanese Cinema: Essential Handbook, authors Thomas and Yuko Weisser awarded the film four out of four stars, calling it the best of contemporary J-Horror cinema, while also noting Argento's films as obvious inspiration.

== Legacy ==
Film scholar Colette Balmain has identified Evil Dead Trap as a pivotal film in the development of modern Japanese horror, noting its role in adapting the Western slasher format within a Japanese context and linking it to the later emergence of films such as Ring and Ju-On: The Grudge.

Evil Dead Trap was followed by Evil Dead Trap 2: Hideki (1992), directed by Izō Hashimoto. Although marketed as a sequel, the film is narratively unrelated to its predecessor. It follows Aki, a cinema projectionist who is haunted by the apparition of a young boy and begins to suspect that she may be responsible for a series of murders.

Another film directed by Toshiharu Ikeda, Chigireta ai no satsujin (1993), was subsequently distributed internationally under the title Evil Dead Trap 3: Broken Love Killer, despite having no narrative connection to the earlier films.
