= 1996 in Japanese television =

Events in 1996 in Japanese television.

== Debuts ==
Show	Station	Premiere Date	Genre	Original Run
After War Gundam X	TV Asahi	April 5th	anime	April 5, 1996 - December 28, 1996
B't X	TBS	April 6th	anime	April 6, 1996 - September 21, 1996
B-Fighter Kabuto	TV Asahi	March 3rd	tokusatsu	March 3, 1996 – February 16, 1997
Brave Command Dagwon	Nagoya TV	February 3rd	anime	February 3, 1996 – January 25, 1997
Choukou Senshi Changéríon	TV Tokyo	April 3rd	tokusatsu	April 3rd, 1996 - December 25th, 1996
Detective Conan	Yomiuri TV	January 8th	anime	January 8, 1996 - present
Cinderella Monogatari	NHK BS2	April 4th	anime	April 4, 1996 – October 3, 1996
Dragon Ball GT	Fuji TV	February 7th	anime	February 7, 1996 - November 19, 1997
Gekisou Sentai Carranger	TV Asahi	March 1st	tokusatsu	March 1, 1996 – February 7, 1997
Iguana Girl	TV Asahi	April 15th	drama	April 15, 1996 – June 24, 1996
Itazura na Kiss	TV Asahi	October 14th	drama	October 14, 1996 – December 16, 1996
Kochira Katsushika-ku Kameari Kōen-mae Hashutsujo	Fuji TV	June 16th	anime	June 16, 1996 - December 19, 2004
Kodomo no Omocha	TV Tokyo	April 5th	anime	April 5, 1996 - March 27, 1998
Sailor Moon Sailor Stars	TV Asahi	March 9th	anime	March 9, 1996 - February 8, 1997
Purple Eyes in the Dark	TV Asahi	July 1st	drama	July 1, 1996 – September 9, 1996
Rurouni Kenshin: Meiji Swordsman Romantic Story	Fuji TV	January 10th	anime	January 10, 1996 – September 8, 1998
Saber Marionette J	TV Tokyo	October 1st	anime	October 1, 1996 - March 25, 1997
Shichisei Tōshin Guyferd	TV Tokyo	April 8th	tokusatsu	April 8, 1996 – September 30, 1996
Slayers Next	TV Tokyo	April 5th	anime	April 5, 1996 – September 27, 1996
The Vision of Escaflowne	TV Tokyo	April 2nd	anime	April 2, 1996 – September 24, 1996
Ultraman Tiga	MBS	September 7th	tokusatsu	September 7, 1996 – August 30, 1997
VS Knight Ramune & 40 Fire	TV Tokyo	April 3rd	anime	April 3, 1996 – September 25, 1996
You're Under Arrest	TBS	October 5th	anime	October 5, 1996 - September 27, 1997

== Ongoing shows ==
- Music Fair, music (1964–present)
- Mito Kōmon, jidaigeki (1969-2011)
- Sazae-san, anime (1969–present)
- Ōoka Echizen, jidaigeki (1970-1999)
- FNS Music Festival, music (1974-present)
- Panel Quiz Attack 25, game show (1975–present)
- Doraemon, anime (1979-2005)
- Soreike! Anpanman, anime (1988-present)
- Downtown no Gaki no Tsukai ya Arahende!!, game show (1989–present)
- Crayon Shin-chan, anime (1992-present)
- Iron Chef, game show (1993-1999)
- Nintama Rantarō, anime (1993–present)
- Shima Shima Tora no Shimajirō, anime (1993-2008)
- Chibi Maruko-chan, anime (1995-present)
- Azuki-chan, anime (1995–1998)
- Sailor Moon, anime (1992-1997)

== Endings ==
Show	Station	Ending Date	Genre	Original Run
After War Gundam X	TV Asahi	December 28th	anime	April 5, 1996 - December 28, 1996
B't X	TBS	September 21st	anime	April 6, 1996 - September 21, 1996
Bonobono	TV Tokyo	April 20th	anime	April 20, 1995 – March 28, 1996
Bit the Cupid	TV Tokyo	April 20th	anime	April 20, 1995 – March 28, 1996
The Brave of Gold Goldran	TV Asahi	January 27th	anime	February 4, 1995 – January 27, 1996
Choriki Sentai Ohranger	TV Asahi	February 23rd	tokusatsu	March 3, 1995 – February 23, 1996
Choukou Senshi Changéríon	TV Tokyo	December 25th	tokusatsu	April 3rd, 1996 - December 25th, 1996
Cinderella Monogatari	NHK BS2	October 3rd	anime	April 4, 1996 – October 3, 1996
Dragon Ball Z	Fuji TV	January 31st	anime	April 26, 1989 - January 31, 1996
Fushigi Yûgi	TV Tokyo	March 28th	anime	April 6, 1995 – March 28, 1996
Kiteretsu Daihyakka	Fuji TV	June 9th	anime	March 27, 1988 - June 9, 1996
Iguana Girl	TV Asahi	June 24th	drama	April 15, 1996 – June 24, 1996
Itazura na Kiss	TV Asahi	December 16th	drama	October 14, 1996 – December 16, 1996
Juukou B-Fighter	TV Asahi	February 25th	tokusatsu	February 5, 1995 – February 25, 1996
Mobile Suit Gundam Wing	TV Asahi	March 29th	anime	April 7, 1995 – March 29, 1996
Neon Genesis Evangelion	TV Tokyo	March 27th	anime	October 4, 1995 – March 27, 1996
Nurse Angel Ririka SOS	TV Tokyo	March 29	anime	July 7, 1995 - March 29, 1996
Purple Eyes in the Dark	TV Asahi	September 9th	drama	July 1, 1996 – September 9, 1996
Sailor Moon SuperS	TV Asahi	March 2nd	anime	March 4, 1995 - March 2, 1996
Shichisei Tōshin Guyferd	TV Tokyo	Septekmber 30th	tokusatsu	April 8, 1996 – September 30, 1996
Slayers Next	TV Tokyo	September 27	anime	April 5, 1996 – September 27, 1996
The Vision of Escaflowne	TV Tokyo	September 24th	anime	April 2, 1996 – September 24, 1996
VS Knight Ramune & 40 Fire	TV Tokyo	September 25th	anime	April 3, 1996 – September 25, 1996

== See also ==
- 1996 in anime
- List of Japanese television dramas
- 1996 in Japan
- List of Japanese films of 1996
