= Seiichi Tanabe =

Japanese actor (born 1969)

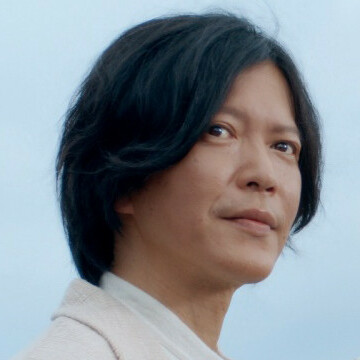
- Born: April 3, 1969 (age 56); Tokyo, Japan
- Occupation: Actor
- Years active: 1987–present
- Spouse: Nene Otsuka (m. 2002)

Seiichi Tanabe (田辺誠一) is a Japanese actor. He won the award for best actor at the 24th Yokohama Film Festival for Hush! and at the 27th Hochi Film Award for Hush! and Harmful Insect.

== Filmography ==
=== Film ===
- Atashi wa juice (1996)
- April Story (1998)
- Blues Harp (1998)
- Ring 0: Birthday (2000)
- Hush! (2001)
- Harmful Insect (2002)
- Milk White (2004)
- Atagoal wa Neko no Mori (2006), Gilbars (voice)
- Happy Flight (2008)
- Liar Game: The Final Stage (2010)
- Mother's Trees (2015)
- The 100th Love with You (2017), Shuntaro Hasegawa
- Psychic Kusuo (2017), Kuniharu Saiki
- Bleach (2018), Kisuke Urahara
- Snow Flower (2019), Wakamura
- A Garden of Camellias (2021)
- Inori (2021)
- Boy's Wish: We Can Use Magic Once in a Lifetime (2025)

=== Television ===
- Asunaro Hakusho (1993)
- Rasen (1999)
- Tramps Like Us (2003)
- Damens Walker (2006)
- Fūrin Kazan (2007), Oyamada Nobuari
- Hotelier (2007)
- Kami no Shizuku (2009)
- Shōkōjo Seira (2009)
- Twin Spica (2009)
- Toge (2016)
- Chichi, Nobunaga (2017), Kazuo Oda
- Keiji Shichinin (2018-present)
- Detective Yuri Rintaro (2020), Todoroki
- Reach Beyond the Blue Sky (2021), Odaka Junchū
- Ann's Lyrics: Ann Sakuragi's Haiku Lessons (2021)
- Only Just Married (2021), Satoshi Morita
- My Love Mix-Up! (2021), Masahiro Taniguchi
- DCU: Deep Crime Unit (2022), Akio Totsuka (ep. 8)
- What Will You Do, Ieyasu? (2023), Anayama Baisetsu
- Ranman (2023), Motoyoshi Noda
- Hakobiya (2024), Ken Shiratori
- SKY Castle (2024), Hideyo Asami
- Dr. Ashura (2025), Shūji Ōguro
