= Shinjuku Yamabuki High School =

Coordinates: 35°42′24.8″N 139°43′41.4″E

- 東京都立新宿山吹高等学校

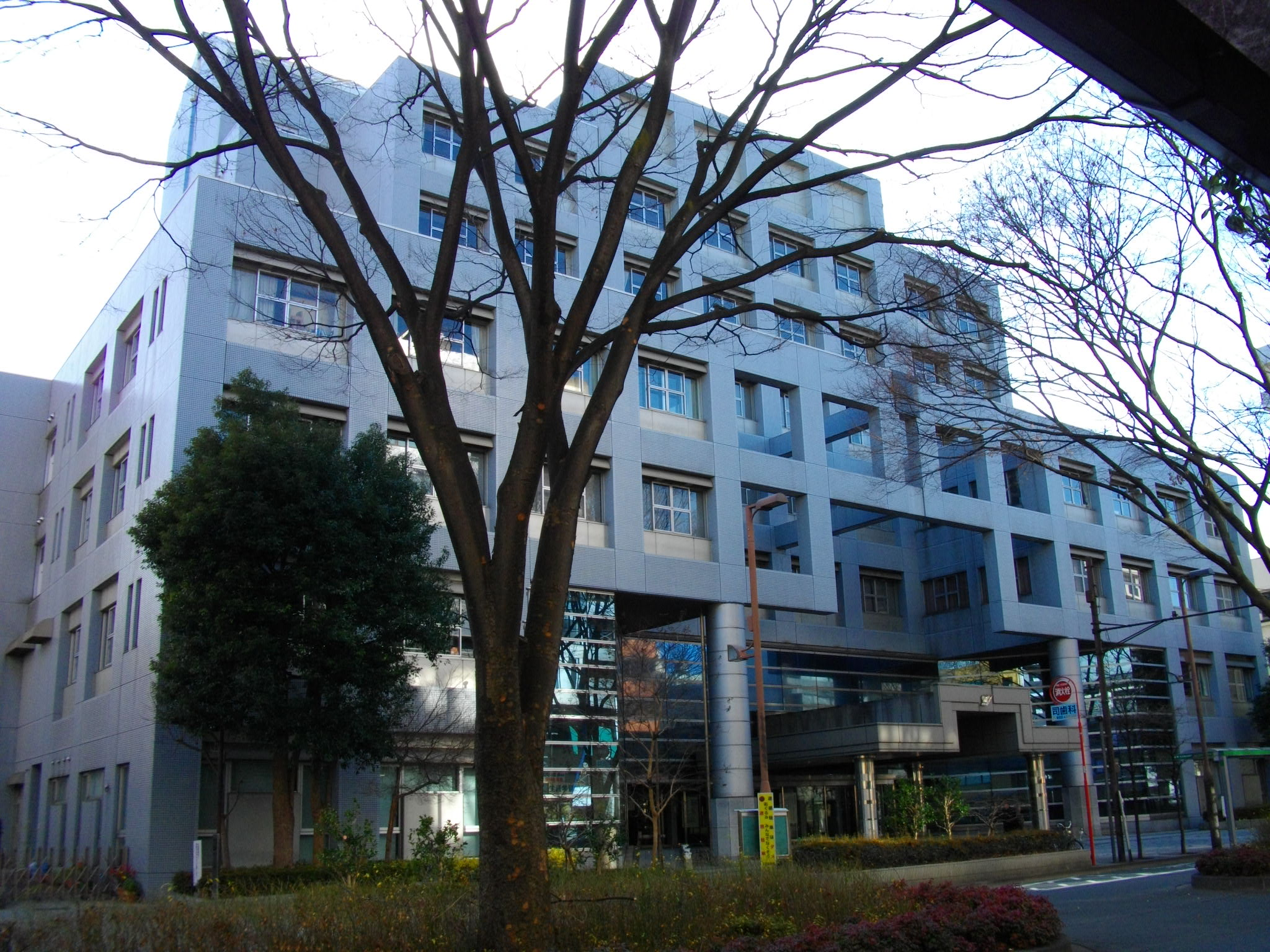

Location
- 81 Yamabuki-chō; Shinjuku, Tokyo, 162-8612; Japan

Information
- Type: Public
- Established: 1991
- School district: Tokyo Metropolitan Government Board of Education
- Principal: Toshio Ishikura (石倉敏雄, Toshio Ishikura)
- Website: www.metro.ed.jp/shinjukuyamabuki-h/

Tokyo Metropolitan Shinjuku Yamabuki High School (東京都立新宿山吹高等学校, Tōkyō-to Ritsu Shinjuku Yamabuki Kōtōgakkō) is located in Yamabuki-cho, Shinjuku, Tokyo, Japan. Shinjuku Yamabuki has Japan's most famous no class credit system and Information Technology course of high school. Shinjuku Yamabuki is operated by the Tokyo Metropolitan Government Board of Education.

Many of the students leave school before graduation. This school prioritizes diversity and is famous for its advanced technology.

== School tradition ==
Uniforms are worn at the school. They are not mandatory.

The school is open from 8:45 AM to 2:15 PM. Students create their own schedule, ensuring that they earn the required 74 credits in order to graduate, and they pay tuition for each class they take. In the class of 2003, students had to pay 1440 JPY per class.

High-schools of Finland are similar in the sense that student's curriculum vary based on the choice of the individual.

== Course ==
- Part-time standard
- Part-time Information Technology
- correspondence standard

== Notable alumni ==
- Emi Hashino
- Harumi Inoue
- Kana Mannami
- Sonim
- Rio Shimamoto
