= Director's Company =

Japanese film production company

Director's Company (ディレクターズ・カンパニー, Direkutāzu・Kanpanī) was a Japanese film production company created in 1982 to provide a venue outside the major studio system for young proven filmmakers to grow artistically.

The company's president, Susumu Miyasaka, came from an advertising and public relations background and he was joined by founding members Kazuhiko Hasegawa, Toshiharu Ikeda, Gakuryū Ishii, Kazuyuki Izutsu, Kiyoshi Kurosawa, Kichitaro Negishi, Kazuki Ōmori, Shinji Sōmai and Banmei Takahashi, none of them older than 36 years of age. Many started their mainstream career at this time, building upon Miyasaka's ideal of expanding the restricting ambitions of Nikkatsu's Roman Porno and pink films.

For distribution of its works, the group maintained links with major companies such as Nikkatsu, Kadokawa Pictures and Art Theatre Guild, as well as the smaller firms New Century Producers and Kitty Films. The company dissolved due to bankruptcy in 1992, ten years after its foundation.

== Major works ==
- Wolf (狼, Ōkami) (1982, Banmei Takahashi)
- Kandagawa Pervert Wars (1983, Kiyoshi Kurosawa)
- The Crazy Family (1984, Sōgo Ishii)
- Mermaid Legend (1984, Toshiharu Ikeda)
- Love Hotel (1985, Shinji Sōmai)
- Typhoon Club (1985, Shinji Sōmai)
- Scent of a Spell (魔性の香り, Masho no kaori) (1985, Toshiharu Ikeda)
- House of Wedlock (1986, Kichitaro Negishi)
- Inuji ni Seshi Mono (1986, Kazuyuki Izutsu)
- Halber Mensch (1986, Sōgo Ishii)
- Eien no 1/2 (1987, Kichitaro Negishi)
- Evil Dead Trap (1988, Toshiharu Ikeda)
