= Miyuki Ono =

Japanese actress

- 小野みゆき
- Born: 17 November 1959 (age 66); Shizuoka prefecture, Japan
- Occupations: Actor, Model
- Years active: 1979–present
- Height: 1.6 m (5 ft 3 in)
- Spouse: Akihiro Shimizu
- Children: Baku Owada, Kumiko Okae
- Parents: Iwai Hanshirō X (father); Keiko Han (mother)

Miyuki Ono (小野みゆき) is a Japanese actress and model. She is best known for her acting. Some of her work includes Black Rain, Evil Dead Trap, Fruits of Passion, G.I. Samurai, Black Angel Vol. 1, and The Man Behind the Scissors.

== Filmography ==
Year	Title	Role	Notes
1979	Torakku Yarō: Neppū 5000 Kiro aka Torakku Yaro, Hot Air 5000 km	Natsu Nishizawa (Madonna)	The film technically makes her debut and also her first starring role at age 19 as the lead (aka the Madonna). It released on 4 August 1979.
1979	G.I. Samurai (aka Sengoku Self- Defense Force)	Miwa	A few months later, 15 December, she appeared in this movie in a minor role (of my assumptions as of this writing), as Miwa.
1981	Fruits of Passion	Kasen / Prostitute	
1983	Purumeria no densetsu (aka Legend of Plumeria)	Yuko Hirose	
1983	El Ovi Ai NG	Female Teacher	
1983	Okinawan Boys	Mariko Shimoike	
1984	Sayonara Jupiter	Anita	
1985	Seijo Densetsu (aka Legend of the Holy Woman)	Wang Li-Hua	
1985	My Lucky Stars	Millionaire Chan's secretary	
1985	Mō kami mo, mou (aka No More God, No More)	Wang Reika	
1987	Abunai Deka	Midori Yuki	
1988	Evil Dead Trap	Nami Tsuchiya	In one of her most famous roles, Ono plays a TV host who investigates a deserted factory after receiving a snuff film that was reportedly shot there.
1989	Black Rain	Miyuki	
1990	Hong Kong Paradise	Zhou Kaoran	
1991	Taro! Tokyo Makai Taisen	Megumi Katsuragi	
1993	Pro Golfer Oribê Kinjirô (aka Pro Golfer Kinjiro Oribe)	Ayako Mouri	
1998	Baburu to Neta Onna-Tachi (aka Woman Who Slept with the Bubble)	Machiko Mizushima	
1998	Kuro no tenshi Vol. 1 (aka Black Angel Vol. 1)	Chaiki Amaoka	
1999	Hakuchi	Utsugi	
2005	Hasami Otoko (aka The Man Behind the Scissors)	Miya Toshie	Last movie she did before hiatus.
2018	Kushina, what will you be	Onikuma	First movie she did after hiatus.
