= Black Angels =

Black Angels may refer to:

- Black Angels (Crumb), a 1970 composition for string quartet by George Crumb
- Black Angels (album), a 1990 album by Kronos Quartet, featuring Crumb's composition
- The Black Angels (band), an American rock band
- The Black Angels (EP), a 2005 EP
- The Black Angels, a 1926 novel by Maud Hart Lovelace
- The Black Angels, a 1970 outlaw biker film
- Brussels Black Angels, a Belgian Football League team
- Los Ángeles Negros, a Latin pop group

== See also ==
- The Black Angel (disambiguation)
