= Freeze Me =

- Theatrical poster for Freeze Me (2000)
- Directed by: Takashi Ishii
- Written by: Takashi Ishii
- Produced by: Takashi Ishii; Nobuaki Nagae; Taketo Niitsu
- Starring: Harumi Inoue; Shingo Tsurumi; Kazuki Kitamura; Naoto Takenaka; Shunsuke Matsuoka
- Cinematography: Yasushi Sasakibara
- Music by: Goro Yasukawa
- Distributed by: Nikkatsu
- Release date: 27 May 2000 (Japan)
- Running time: 101 minutes
- Country: Japan
- Language: Japanese

Freeze Me (フリーズ・ミー, Furiizu Mii), or Freezer, is a 2000 Japanese rape and revenge thriller film by director Takashi Ishii. This film stars Harumi Inoue as Chihiro, a rape victim who tries to live a normal life.

== Synopsis ==
One February night in a small town north of Tokyo, school girl Chihiro Yamazaki was brutally raped at home by her childhood friend Noboru and his two friends Minoru Baba and Atsushi Kojima, who even recorded their misdeed on film. Traumatized, she left for Tokyo, where she managed to bring her life back on track and even got herself a boyfriend. However, five years later, Chihiro is horrified to meet Noboru, who has tracked her down. She tries to flee into her apartment, but Noboru catches up with her, brazenly lodges himself in her apartment and prepares to rape her again. Chihiro manages to lock herself into the bathroom, but then Noboru begins to put pictures of Chihiro's previous rape into her neighbors' mail slots, forcing her to give in to his sadistic whims. He also summons Baba and Kojima to join him at Chihiro's place.

Noboru soon begins to barge into every aspect of Chihiro's life, and by introducing himself as her new boyfriend, he purposefully isolates her from her friends. Chihiro's desperate mind quickly turns to murder, and one day, as Noboru takes a bath, she slays him by bashing his head in with a water bottle and hides the body in her freezer. However, right afterwards the next of her old tormentors, Kojima, arrives. Initially he apologizes to Chihiro for his misdeed, but drunk and frustrated with his life, he eventually also begins to lust after her. As he prepares to get himself a beer from the freezer, he finds Noboru's body stuffed inside and is thereupon killed by Chihiro. Developing a sick fascination for frozen corpses, she purchases another freezer and hides Kojima's body inside.

After leaving a message for her boyfriend Nogami, telling him all what happened to her five years ago, Chihiro packs up and moves away. However, the last of her tormentors, Baba, finds her but is not aware that she killed his friends. He also rapes Chihiro, but as he plays video games afterwards, Chihiro slays him and stuffs his body into her freezer; however, a power outage in her apartment disables the refrigeration systems, gradually thawing the bodies and leaving them to rot in the summer heat. Driven delirious by a fever, Chihiro decides to flee to Europe when she is suddenly visited by Nogami, who has missed her. After spending the night together, Nogami notices the smell of decay and finds the bodies in the freezers. Chihiro instinctively kills him as well, but after coming to her senses, and with her life now thoroughly in shambles, she commits suicide by throwing herself off her balcony.

== Cast ==
- Harumi Inoue as Chihiro Yamazaki
- Kazuki Kitamura as Noboru Hirokawa, Chihiro's former childhood friend and one of the rapists
- Naoto Takenaka as Minoru Baba, a yakuza and one of the rapists
- Shingo Tsurumi as Atsushi Kojima, a yakuza and one of the rapists
- Shunsuke Matsuoka as Yûsuke Nogami, Chihiro's colleague and boyfriend

== Release ==
Freeze Me was distributed by Nikkatsu on May 27, 2000.

== Reception ==
The Japan Times, describing Freeze Me, declared that there was "nothing childish about Ishii's vision of evil" and that "Ishii sees more clearly than many of his directorial colleagues, with their winking indulgence of the male id and ego, how that evil, in the absence of any countervailing force, has penetrated to the heart of Japanese society. Chihiro's solution is still extreme, but her worst fears have become all too common."
