= Harumi Inoue =

Japanese idol (born 1974)

Harumi Inoue 井上晴美
- Born: 23 September 1974 (age 51); Kumamoto, Japan
- Occupations: actress; model; swimmer
- Years active: 1991–present
- Spouse: Unknown (m. 2005; div. 2024)
- Children: 3

Harumi Inoue (井上 晴美, Inoue Harumi; born September 23, 1974 in Kumamoto, Japan) is an actress, model and accomplished swimmer.

== Career ==
Inoue has released pop singles. She was the character "Hiromi Ueda" in the 1995 TV series Kimi To Deatte Kara.

She appeared in Asakusa Kid, a series based on a semi-autobiographical book of the same name by the avant-garde comedian Takeshi Kitano.

Because of her spontaneity, poise and effortless abilities in front of a camera, there are also various DVDs, books and calendars dedicated to her image to be found in her native Japan. Inoue graduated from Shinjuku Yamabuki High School in Tokyo.

== Family ==
Inoue has a younger sister, Mami Inoue, who is also pursuing a similar career. Also, a younger brother, Eiki Kitamura, with whom she performed alongside in Rock Musical Bleach.

== Personal life ==
On September 17, 2005, Inoue married to a Mexican man of the same age whom she met while studying abroad in Canada. She gave birth to her first child, a boy in 2007 and second child, a girl in 2009. She gave birth to her third child, a boy in 2011. The couple divorced in 2024.

She currently lives in her hometown of Kumamoto Prefecture.

== Filmography ==
- Zagashira joshikousei Nami; lit. "School leader Nami" (座頭女子高生ナミ) (1991)
- 賞・金・犬WANTED！ (1995)
- 82 bunsho; lit. "Branch 82", United States title Metropolitan Police Branch 82 (82分署) (1995)
- Moonlight Whispers (1999)
- Freeze Me (2000)
- 銀の男 青森純情篇 プロフェッショナル・マネージメント ... 平井美和 (2002)
- Graveyard of Honor (2002)
- Asakusa Kid (浅草キッド, Asakusa kiddo) (2002)
- 行動隊長伝 血盟 (2003)
- 怪談新耳袋 劇場版 (2004)
- Gonin Saga (2015)

== Musical ==
- テングメン(2006)
- Rock Musical BLEACH The Dark of The Bleeding Moon - Rangiku Matsumoto (August 2006)
- Rock Musical BLEACH The ALL - Rangiku Matsumoto (March 2008)
- Rock Musical BLEACH The Live Bankai Show Code 002 - Rangiku Matsumoto (March 2008)
- Rock Musical BLEACH The Live Bankai Show Code 003 - Rangiku Matsumoto (January–February 2010)
