= Hasami Otoko =

The Man Behind the Scissors
- DVD cover
- Directed by: Toshiharu Ikeda
- Written by: Toshiharu Ikeda; Masahito Kagawa
- Starring: Hiroshi Abe; Kumiko Asō; Koji Higuchi; Kenjirō Ishimaru; Terumi Niki; Miyuki Ono; Ayumu Saitô; Mizuho Sakata; Minori Terada; Etsushi Toyokawa
- Music by: Toshiyuki Honda
- Release date: 2005
- Running time: 124 minutes
- Country: Japan
- Language: Japanese

The Man Behind the Scissors (Japanese: ハサミ男, Hepburn: Hasami Otoko) is a 2005 Japanese film directed by Toshiharu Ikeda.

Based on a novel by Masayuki Shuno, the film is a psychological thriller about a series of murders committed using scissors, the people who carried out the murders, and the police who are trying to catch them.

== Plot ==
The film opens with a female high school student meeting a man and woman in a remote location. She is stabbed in the neck with a pair of scissors. This is followed by similar murder committed by the same people.

The same couple follow another student who they have picked as their next target, but before they can kill her she is joined by an older man. Later they find her body in a park. She was also stabbed in the neck with a pair of scissors in a copycat murder.

The film follows several different plot strands, including the psychological condition of the woman and her relationship with the man, the background of the student who was killed in the copycat murder, and the police hunt for the murderers.

It emerges that the female murderer has a split personality, and the man she is seen with is actually a vision of her dead father caused by her guilt over his suicide when she was younger. The copycat murderer was the police psychological profiler, who had been having an affair with the high school student.

By the end of the film the psychological profiler is dead, and the police blame him for all three murders. The real scissors murderer has a final vision of her father, in which he tells her that he always loved her and she was not to blame for his death. She is then free to be happy.
