= Harmful Insect =

- Directed by: Akihiko Shiota
- Written by: Yayoi Kiyono
- Starring: Aoi Miyazaki; Seiichi Tanabe; Yu Aoi
- Cinematography: Tokusho Kikumura
- Edited by: Yoshio Sugano
- Distributed by: Nikkatsu
- Release dates: November 7, 2001 (Venice Film Festival, Italy); March 16, 2002 (Japan)
- Running time: 92 minutes
- Country: Japan
- Language: Japanese

Harmful Insect (害虫, Gaichū) is a 2001 Japanese drama film directed by Akihiko Shiota and starring Aoi Miyazaki. Shiota credits the original story to Yayoi Kiyono, a student of his during his time teaching at the Film School of Tokyo.

The film follows the life of junior high school student Sachiko Kita. Her father has abandoned their family and her mother attempts to commit suicide. Her former sixth grade teacher, one of the few people she can rely on, is compelled to leave due to rumors of an affair between him and Sachiko. As she becomes the subject of schoolyard gossip, Sachiko drops out and instead wanders around her town, discovering a world that has "no ideals or dreams to pursue, whatsoever."

== Cast ==
- Aoi Miyazaki as Sachiko Kita
- Seiichi Tanabe as Ogata
- Ryo as Toshiko Kita
- Yū Aoi as Natsuko Yamaoka
- Tetsu Sawaki as Takao
- Ryo Amamiya as Tokugawa
- Koji Ishikawa as Kyuzo
- Yuria Haga as Rumi
- Eihi Shiina as Mano
- Yusuke Iseya
- Susumu Terajima
- Ken Mitsuishi
- Masahiro Toda
- Nao Omori

== Awards ==
4th Cinemanila International Film Festival

- Best Actress - Aoi Miyazaki
- NETPAC Award for Best Asian Film - Special Mention

27th Hochi Film Award

- Best Actor - Seiichi Tanabe

24th Yokohama Film Festival

- 9th Best Film
