= Gonin Saga =

- Poster
- Directed by: Takashi Ishii
- Written by: Takashi Ishii
- Starring: Masahiro Higashide; Kenta Kiritani; Anna Tsuchiya; Tasuku Emoto; Masanobu Andō; Naoto Takenaka
- Cinematography: Yasushi Sasakibara; Yoshiaki Yamamoto
- Music by: Goro Yasukawa
- Distributed by: Kadokawa Corporation; Pony Canyon
- Release date: September 26, 2015 (Japan)
- Country: Japan
- Language: Japanese

Gonin Saga (ＧＯＮＩＮ サーガ) is a 2015 Japanese drama film directed by Takashi Ishii. It is a sequel to Gonin and stars Masahiro Higashide and Masanobu Andō.

== Cast ==
- Masahiro Higashide as Hayato Hisamatsu
- Kenta Kiritani as Daisuke Ogoshi
- Anna Tsuchiya as Asami Kikuchi
- Tasuku Emoto as Keiichi Morisawa
- Masanobu Andō as Seiji Shikine
- Jinpachi Nezu as Kaname Hizu
- Rila Fukushima as Yoichi
- Terry Ito as Takamasa Shikine
- Harumi Inoue as Yasue Hisamatsu
- Lily as Katsuko Ogoshi
- Wakana Matsumoto as Yurika
- Shun Sugata as Yuzuru Matsuura
- Shunya Isaka as Masayuki Kuroki
- Shingo Tsurumi as Shigeru Hisamatsu, Hayato's father
- Kōichi Satō (special appearance) as Mikihiko Bandai
- Naoto Takenaka as Myojin
