= Evil Dead Trap 3: Broken Love Killer =

- Theatrical release poster
- Directed by: Toshiharu Ikeda
- Screenplay by: Takashi Ishii
- Starring: Shirō Sano; Megumi Yokoyama; Kimiko Yo
- Release date: June 26, 1993 (Japan)
- Running time: 101 minutes
- Country: Japan
- Language: Japanese

Evil Dead Trap 3: Broken Love Killer (Japanese: ちぎれた愛の殺人, Hepburn: Chigireta ai no satsujin) also known as The Brutal Insanity of Love, is a 1993 Japanese horror film directed by Toshiharu Ikeda. Despite its international title, it is not connected to the Evil Dead Trap series in any way. The film stars Shiro Sano in the lead role of Tetsuro Muraki.

== Cast ==
- Shirō Sano (佐野史郎) as Tetsuro Muraki
- Megumi Yokoyama (横山めぐみ) as Yoko Mizuhashi
- Kimiko Yo as Nami Muraki
- Tatsuo Yamada as Keiji Muto
