= Japan Home Video =

Japanese media corporation

Japan Home Video (JHV)
- Industry: Motion pictures
- Founded: May 9, 1984
- Headquarters: Nakano, Tokyo, Japan
- Products: Motion pictures Anime
- Number of employees: 34
- Divisions: Alice Japan
- Website: JHV

Japan Home Video Co. Ltd. (ジャパンホームビデオ株式会社, JapanHōmuBideo Kabushikigaisha) (JHV) is a Japanese home video company which produces and distributes film and video products and is also involved in TV programming and game software. It uses the label Alice Japan (アリスJAPAN) for its adult video production.

== Company history and finances ==
JHV was established in May 1984 to take advantage of the explosion of videocassette recorders (VCRs) in Japan at that time. Following the introduction of commercial VCR Beta recorders in 1975 (and the VHS format in 1976), VCR production in Japan went from one million units in 1978 to 44 million by 1985 fueled largely by the number of movies (including pornography) available on VHS. By November 1984, the company had expanded enough to move to new headquarters in the fashionable Harajuku district of Tokyo.

The company originally used the Penguin (ぺんぎん) label for its videos but in April 1986, JHV founded Alice Japan (アリスJAPAN) as a label for their adult videos (AV). The company subsequently expanded into softcore movies, anime productions, computer games and, in 1996, the satellite broadcasting business. In February 2000, JHV acquired a building in the Jinbocho area of Tokyo and transferred its headquarters there. A further move brought the Production Center to their own building in Tokyo's Nakano City in March 2005 which also became the company headquarters in April 2007.

For the 2007 fiscal year, the corporation had sales of 2.25 billion yen (about $22.5 million) and a capital of 27 million yen (about $227,000). The company employed 34 people and had its headquarters in the JHV Building (JHV中野ビル) in Nakano, Tokyo.

== Products ==
The company is involved in the production and distribution of film, video products, music and TV programs.

=== Film and video ===
JHV has produced and/or distributed a number of theatrical movies, including several in the science fiction or horror genre and often with erotic overtones. Some notable film productions include the 1989 cult horror movie Tetsuo: The Iron Man directed by Shinya Tsukamoto and the Yakuza zombie flic Junk: Shiryô-gari from 2000. Also in the horror genre were Evil Dead Trap or Shiryo no wana directed by Toshiharu Ikeda and featuring AV actress Hitomi Kobayashi which was released in 1988 and the sequel Evil Dead Trap 2: Hideki (死霊の罠2ヒデキ) from 1992. Evil Dead Trap was later released by JHV on DVD.

JHV also produced the first three live-action videos of the manga based superheroine series Kekko Kamen, the 1991 Kekko Kamen, Kekko Kamen 2 from 1992, and Kekko Kamen 3, released in 1993.

More recent productions were the 2004 drama The Hunter and the Hunted (油断大敵, Yudan taiteki) which won awards at the 2005 Yokohama Film Festival for Best Actor, Best Supporting Actor and Best New Director and the 2004 comedy eiko (エイコ).

JHV's Cinemadict Collection (シネマディクト・コレクション) is a series of remastered worldwide classic movies with Japanese subtitles released on DVD. The collection includes the hard-to-find Alfred Hitchcock silent film Downhill.

In the area of erotica, JHV makes softcore V-Cinema videos under the V Muvii (Vムービィ) label or the SEN Planning label. Some popular series are the soft S&M Escape Confinement (監禁逃亡), Keep Masked (けっこう仮面) and Pink Curtain (ピンクのカーテン). The company also produces "gravure" non-nude modeling videos, some using the label Girls' Record.

=== Anime ===
The company has long had an interest in anime products. In the early 1980s, they distributed a handful of early anime, with known titles including Harris's Whirlwind (ハリスの旋風, Harisu no Kaze) and 0-Battle Hayato (0戦はやと, Zero Tatakae Hayato). The first anime produced by Japan Home Video was Lolicon Angel: A Taste of Honey (蜜の味, Mitsu no Aji), released on VHS on January 10, 1985, capitalizing on the "Lolicon Boom" of the early 1980s. The tape was initially released under a different title and cover, but it was quickly pulled from sale due to obscenity, and reissued with additional censorship.

On April 25, 1987, the dark adult-oriented science fiction horror film Wicked City (妖獣都市, Yoju Toshi) was released in theatres by JHV and later on DVD. They also produced the anime movie A Wind Named Amnesia (風の名はアムネジア, Kaze no Na wa Amunejia) which debuted in theatres in Japan in December 1990 and as a video in 1993. A different type of project produced by JHV was the comic Nekojiru Gekijou (ねこぢる劇場 - ぢるぢるORIGINAL), a series of 27 shorts broadcast on TV Asahi in 1999.

In addition, JHV had a role in the production of the following Original Video Animations:

- MAPS: Legendary Space Wanderers (マップス 伝説のさまよえる星人たち, Mappusu: Densetsu no Samayoeru Seijintachi) 1987
- Demon City Shinjuku (魔界都市 <新宿, Makai Toshi: Shinjuku) 1988
- Twin (爆走サーキット·ロマン TWIN, Hassai Circuit Roman Twin) 1989
- Angel Cop 1989
- Cyber City Oedo 808 (サイバーシティ OEDO 808, Saibāshiti OEDO 808) 1990-1991 (3 episodes)
- Secrets of the Telephone Club (テレクラの秘密 Terekura no Himitsu) 1991
- Shin Dosei Jidai: Hawaiian Breeze (新・同棲時代 HAWAIIAN BREEZE) 1992
- Eien no Aseria: Spirit of Eternity Sword (永遠のアセリア) 2005-2006 (2 episodes)

=== Computer games ===
Graduation (ja:卒業 〜Graduation〜 or Sotsugyō) is the title of a simulation genre computer game first released by JHV in June 1992. Two years later in 1994, a sequel Graduation 2: Neo Generation (卒業II 〜Neo Generation〜) appeared. The game, the object of which is to get five young girls with various problems to graduate high school, has since had several incarnations and been ported to a number of systems including the Sony PlayStation 2.
