= Fruits of Passion =

1981 film

- Film poster
- Directed by: Shūji Terayama
- Screenplay by: Shūji Terayama; Rio Kishida
- Based on: Retour à Roissy by Anne Desclos
- Produced by: Anatole Dauman; Hiroko Govars; Eiko Kujo
- Starring: Klaus Kinski; Isabelle Illiers; Arielle Dombasle; Renji Ishibashi; Miyuki Ono; Peter
- Cinematography: Tatsuo Suzuki
- Edited by: Henri Colpi
- Music by: J. A. Seazer
- Release date: 3 June 1981
- Running time: 83 minutes
- Countries: France; Japan
- Languages: French; Japanese; English

Fruits of Passion (French: Les fruits de la passion; Japanese: 上海異人娼館／チャイナ・ドール, romanized: Shanhai ijin shōkan - Chaina Dōru, lit. 'Shanghai Foreigner Brothel - China Doll') is a 1981 French-Japanese co-production directed by Shūji Terayama and starring Klaus Kinski. The film is loosely based on the novel Retour à Roissy by Anne Desclos, written as a sequel to the Story of O.

While the film continues the story of O, a subplot depicts an anti-European rebellion in southern China.

== Plot ==
The lead characters of the Story of O and Retour à Roissy novels, Sir Stephen and O, are placed in southern China where Sir Stephen owns a casino. Sir Stephen places O in a Chinese brothel for "training" and O is then subjected to a variety of humiliating experiences to prove her unconditional obedience. A sub-plot concerns a local rebellion due to the resentment towards Europeans by the local population and a young man desperate to afford O's favors at the brothel.

== Cast ==
- Isabelle Illiers as O
- Klaus Kinski as Sir Stephen
- Arielle Dombasle as Nathalie
- Peter as Madame
- Keiko Niitaka as Aisen
- Sayoko Yamaguchi as Sakuya
- Hitomi Takahashi as Byakuran
- Miyuki Ono as Kasen
- Yuka Kamebuchi
- Kenichi Nakamura as Le jeune homme, Ogaku
- Akiro Suetsugu as Obana
- Renji Ishibashi as Kato
- Takeshi Wakamatsu as Le gardien de la maison
- Georges Wilson as Le narrateur (voice)

== Production ==
In a 2017 interview with the French magazine VSD, Arielle Dombasle looked back on the film with regret: "It's something that hurt me terribly, I was too young to do that, and then Kinski ... he was crazy." She added about Kinski: "He's a guy who crushes the weak, the ugliest thing in the world, someone who loved power, who absolutely wanted to be loved, and who did everything to make sure we did not love him."

In his autobiography, Klaus Kinski claimed the sex scenes in which he participated in this movie were unsimulated.

== Release ==
The film was released in France on 3 June 1981 as Les fruits de la passion and as Shanhai ijin shōkan - Chaina Dōru in Japan with censoring of the pubic areas in November 1981. The USA release as Fruits of Passion with English dubbing occurred in November 1982. A version in Japanese with English subtitles on VHS tape and DVD was published as Fruits of Passion - The Story of "O" Continued on 20 June 2000. A digitally remastered version of the film was released in Japan in Japanese, English and French with Japanese subtitles in December 2005.

== Reception ==
Reaction to the film has been mixed. Roberta Novielli described it as "shallow and decadent", while Jasper Sharp called it "minor Terayama" whose "charms are mainly cosmetic", the costuming, sets and cinematography. Thomas and Yuko Mihara Weisser gave the movie three stars out of four, but say it is based on the "look" of the film and not on its narrative or coherence.
