= Hush! (film) =

2001 film by Ryōsuke Hashiguchi

- DVD cover
- Directed by: Ryosuke Hashiguchi
- Written by: Ryosuke Hashiguchi
- Produced by: Tetsujiro Yamagami
- Starring: Seiichi Tanabe; Kazuya Takahashi; Reiko Kataoka
- Cinematography: Shogo Ueno
- Edited by: Ryosuke Hashiguchi
- Music by: Bobby McFerrin
- Distributed by: Siglo
- Release dates: May 2001 (Cannes Film Festival); April 27, 2002 (Japan)
- Running time: 135 minutes
- Country: Japan
- Language: Japanese

Hush! (Japanese: ハッシュ!) is a 2001 Japanese film directed by Ryōsuke Hashiguchi, starring Seiichi Tanabe, Kazuya Takahashi and Reiko Kataoka.

The theme song is "Hush Little Baby" from the album Hush performed by Bobby McFerrin and Yo-Yo Ma.

== Synopsis ==
The protagonists are two gay men and a woman. The three of them have come to realize that people are inherently lonely, but they still choose to have companionship. They sense that beyond bitterness and resignation, there is new hope. As such, they overcome problems of reality and explore a new possibility and definition of "family".

== Cast ==
Actor	Role
Seiichi Tanabe	Katsuhiro Kurita
Kazuya Takahashi	Naoya Hase
Reiko Kataoka	Asako Fujikura
Tsugumi	Emi Nagata
Manami Fuji	Katsumi Hase, Naoya's mother
Yoko Akino	Yoko Kurita, Katsuhiro's sister-in-law
Ken Mitsuishi	Shoji Kurita, Katsuhiro's brother
Magara Kanako	Kaoru Kurita, Katsuhiro's niece
Minori Terada	Mr. Fujikura, Asako's father
Tetsu Sawaki	Makoto
Yôsuke Saitô	Aritomo
Kanako Fukaura	Tadokoro
Natsumi Maruyama	Mai Tadokoro
Satoshi Yamanaka	Yūji
Ryō Iwamatsu	Gynecologist
Yasushi Inoue	Mayama
Hiroshi Anan	Chief Itsuchi
Ryo Kase	Soba-ya Cashier
Mutsumi Kajita	Family at soba-ya
Shō Kajita	Family at soba-ya
Tsubasa Kajita	Family at soba-ya
Jirō Satō	Hirose
Naoko Satō	Masa
Sakura Kawasaki	Horiuchi
Taiju Okayasu	Hiro
Daishi Matsunaga	Hiro's boyfriend
Manabu Ino	Master
Kazutoshi Harada	Tenant
Hiroo Takagi	Young man at beginning
Asami Sawaki	Nurse from Mitsuka Dental Clinic
Maiko Shimizu	Nurse from Mitsuka Dental Clinic
Akira the Hustler	Macho man
Shūko Itō	Woman from Obstetrics/Gynecology room
Kazue Takani	Nurse from nurse center
Rie Hariwara	Pregnant woman giving birth
Seiji Īnuma	Swimming instructor
Megumi Ujie	Pregnant woman in the swimming pool
Yō Yazawa yō	Pregnant woman in the swimming pool
Osawa Keiko	Family restaurant waitress
Masaki Iwabuchi	
Naotaka Ichimura	
Sasaki Osamu	
Tomoki Mukai	
Kei Hattori	
Yōhei Nakano	

== Awards ==
- 2002 – Hochi Film Awards: Best Actor (Seiichi Tanabe)
- 2002 – Kinema Junpo Awards: Best Actress (Reiko Kataoka)
- 2003 – Blue Ribbon Awards: Best Actress (Reiko Kataoka)
- 2003 – Yokohama Film Festival: Best Film, Best Director (Ryosuke Hashiguchi), Best Actor (Seiichi Tanabe)
