= Makiko Watanabe =

Japanese actress (born 1968)

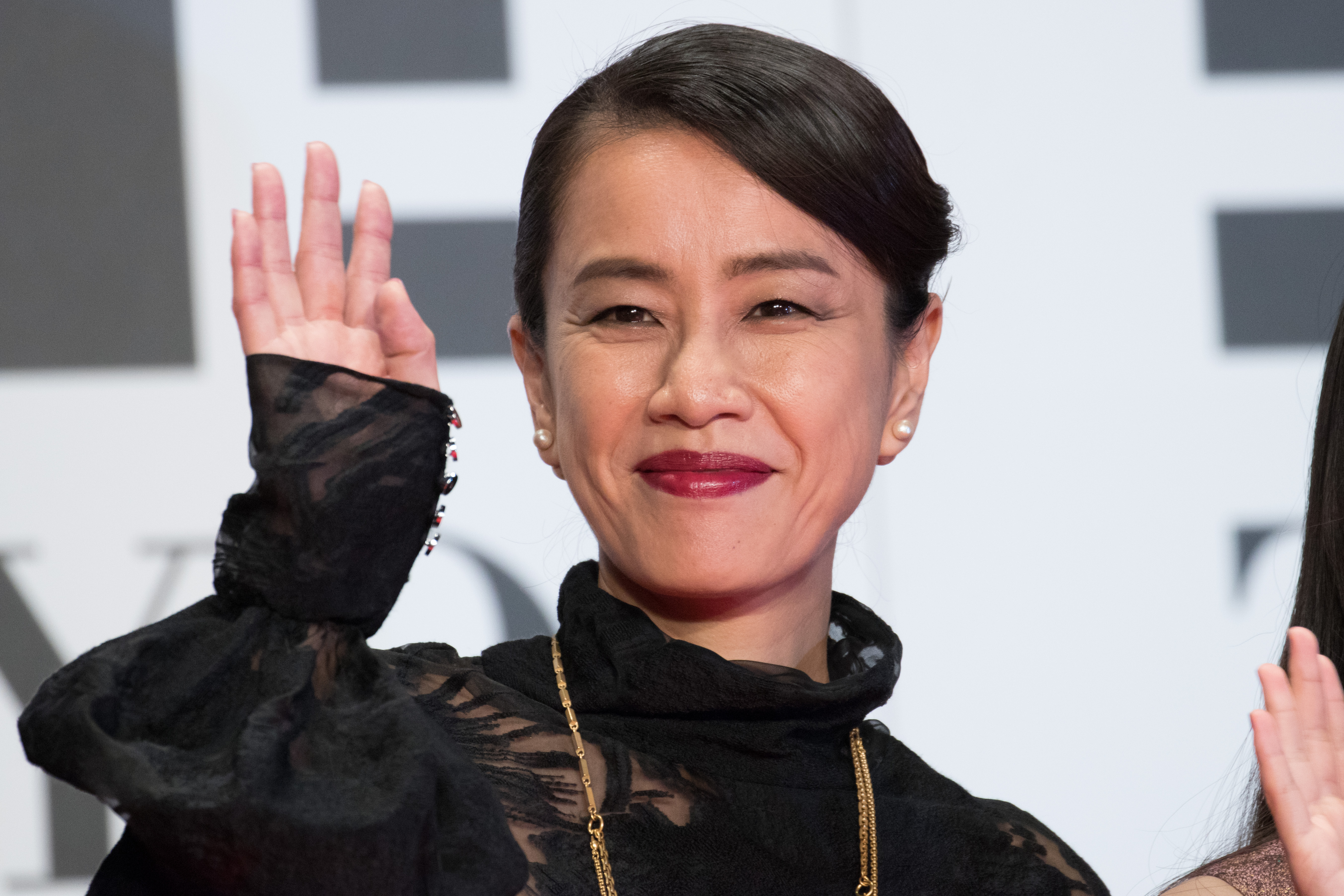
- Watanabe at the 2016 Tokyo International Film Festival
- Born: 14 September 1968 (age 58); Tokyo, Japan
- Occupation: Actress
- Years active: 1986–present

Makiko Watanabe (渡辺 真起子, Watanabe Makiko; born September 14, 1968) is a Japanese actress. She has appeared in more than 60 films since 1996.

== Awards ==
Watanabe was given the award for best script at the 1999 Mainichi Film Awards for M/Other with director Nobuhiro Suwa and co-star Tomokazu Miura for dialogue that was mostly improvised on the set.

== Selected filmography ==
=== Film ===
Year	Title	Role	Notes	Ref.
1996	XX: Beautiful Prey			
2004	Zebraman			
2007	The Mourning Forest			
2007	The Rebirth			
2008	Love Exposure			
2011	Himizu			
2014	Still the Water			
2016	While the Women Are Sleeping			
2017	Hello, Goodbye			
2018	My Friend "A"			
2018	A Banana? At This Time of Night?			
2019	37 Seconds			
2019	Aesop's Game			
2019	Walking Man			
2020	Momi's House			
2020	The Asadas			
2020	State of Emergency			
2021	Tomorrow's Dinner Table			
2021	Rurouni Kenshin: The Beginning	Landlady		
2022	Midnight Maiden War			
2022	Small, Slow But Steady			
2022	Haw	Reiko Nanebshima		
2022	Fragments of the Last Will			
2023	Tokyo MER: Mobile Emergency Room – The Movie	Mariko Shirokane		
2023	Family			
2024	Desert of Namibia	Mari Hayashi		
2024	Happyend	Yōko		
2025	The Harbor Lights	Izumi		
2025	Or Utopia			
2025	Tokyo MER: Mobile Emergency Room – Nankai Mission	Mariko Shirokane		
2025	Bridge of Avidya	Yukiko Yagi	Lead role	
2026	I Don't Know You		French-Japanese film	
2026	Tokyo MER: Mobile Emergency Room – Capital Crisis	Mariko Shirokane		
2026	Missed You, Left You, Lost You, Miss You	Kaoru Kikuchi		
2027	All That Exists	Yuko Nishio		

=== Television ===
Year	Title	Role	Notes	Ref.
2022	Tokyo Vice	Kazuko Tozawa	American drama	
2023	Tengu no Daidokoro	Ichino Izuna Wilson		
2024	The Great Passage	Kaoru Sasaki		
2024	Golden Kamuy: The Hunt of Prisoners in Hokkaido	Monoa		
2026	Mt. Fuji Erupts: Are We Prepared?		Miniseries	
2027	Sins of Kujo	Hanae Iemori		
