= Kuro no tenshi Vol. 2 =

- Film poster
- Directed by: Takashi Ishii
- Written by: Takashi Ishii
- Starring: Yūki Amami; Reiko Kataoka
- Distributed by: Shochiku
- Release date: November 13, 1999 (Japan)
- Running time: 107 min.
- Country: Japan
- Language: Japanese

Kuro no tenshi Vol. 2 (Japanese: 黒の天使 Vol.2) is a 1999 Japanese film directed by Takashi Ishii. The film stars Yūki Amami and Reiko Kataoka.

== Plot ==
Some gangsters arrive in Tokyo, discussing plans to abuse some sex workers, but are soon killed by a woman that onscreen text tells us is The Black Angel.

Back at her home, the Black Angel, sleeping beside her pistol, has a nightmare of three shadowy figures who can't be killed by bullets. They shoot her, however, and one of the figures steps forward. As he fires the killing shot, she wakes up.

Walking the streets at night, the Black Angel wanders into an underground carpark. Seeing a mysterious black car enter and pass her, she follows it covertly, to see who it's picking up. The client is another gangster, this one called Toyo, and, following a swig from a hipflask, the Black Angel takes out her pistol and moves towards Toyo and his two bodyguards, Yamabe and Sugita. Before they notice her, what looks to be a mother and her son approach the gangsters. Appearing playful at first, the boy suddenly pulls a pistol and shoots at the gangsters before one of the guards shoots him. The mother screams, pulling out a pistol of her own and firing blindly at the gangsters before running off. The Black Angel steps out from the hiding spot where she had been watching this and begins to fire at Toyo and his guards. One of Yamabe's bullets catches her right leg and another hits the husband, Shin, of a passing couple. His pregnant wife's cries distract the Black Angel, allowing Toyo and Yamabe to escape, though Sugita dies. Unsuccessful in her mission, the Black Angel flees as well.

A wounded Toyo blames a rival gangster, Osawa, for these events while looking for things to patch himself up with inside an empty hospital he owns. Angry, Toyo doesn't accept Yamabe's apologies.

Elsewhere, a third gangster, Yazaki, admonishes the mother from the carpark for failing to kill Toyo, only succeeding in getting her husband, Sugita, killed. Because of this and his difficulty making money through a club he owns, Yazaki refuses to pay her. When she pulls a gun and suggests he pay her with his life insurance, he pretends to give her some money before one of his subordinates shoots her.

The Black Angel stumbles home, wounded, and strips to her underwear in order to assess the damage from the firefight. She cleans her leg wound in her shower before tending to it further. As she's getting dressed again, the Black Angel receives a call on her cell phone from someone who calls her Mayu and complains that she failed to complete her task. She counters that, if they had thought she was a drunk, they shouldn't have sent her on the mission. Mayu then complains that the person on the other end of the call sent another team, the boy and the woman pretending to be his mother, to complete the same job and warns them against double crossing her. Mayu is tormented by memories of the crying pregnant woman from the carpark, who Mayu didn't help.

In another nightmare, Mayu finds herself in an alley, being offered help by a man, while someone beside them is badly wounded. She then dreams she is trying to cut a story concerning a gangster called Tatsuo Yamabe out of a newspaper, when the paper starts bleeding. Mayu wakes to find someone sitting beside her in bed, treating her leg wound. The stranger goes by the name Mommy and claims to be the person she spoke to on the phone earlier. Mommy explains that they could enter Mayu's home because it's owned by the organisation they both work for and that the mother/son pair from the carpark were trying to complete their final hit before retiring. Before leaving, Mommy gives Mayu antibiotics and warns her that she was followed. They muse that, while forgetting is good, Mayu shouldn't lose herself to alcoholism. Mayu falls asleep again once Mommy has left.

Later, Toyo, Osawa and Yazaki meet with their Godfather in Toyo's hospital in order for Toyo to accuse Osawa of calling the hit on him. The Godfather recommends they should take no action for now and let him investigate this matter. Toyo and Yazaki make jabs at each other about their failing ventures.

Having lost her baby, Suzu, the woman whose husband died in the carpark, is in hospital when the police visit her, trying to get any details of who was involved in the carpark shooting. Unfortunately, she's too traumatised to speak.

Convalescing at home with ice cream and whiskey, Mayu is still haunted by the memory of Suzu while listening to a voicemail from Mommy, requesting that Mayu complete the contract she has been hired for. We then see Suzu working at a florists.

Toyo explains to his men, including Yamabe, that although he isn't explicitly ordering them to kill the widowed witness, he expects her to be killed.

We learn that Suzu's florists is struggling for business, as its customers think Shin was part of a gang, but Suzu remains confident business will return. Her next customer is Yamabe, who had come to kill her, but can't bring himself to do so. While Yamabe is being served, Mayu enters the shop, but hides her face from the others. Yamabe gives Suzu an envelope full of money, explains that Shin and he were once in the same gang and then leaves. Suzu calls after Yamabe for his name, but he drives off without giving it. While this is happening, Mayu leaves the shop.

That night, a friend, Kato, takes Suzu to a brothel and shares a rumour that Shin was killed by the Toyo gang. One of the brothel's clients, the Yakuza Godfather, confirms that the Toyo gang killed Shin, dismisses Kato and tells Suzu that their leader frequents the Yokohama Birds Club if she wants to get revenge. To this end, the Godfather offers to teach her how to use a gun, but when she refuses this offer, he rapes her. While doing this, he instructs her how to kill Toyo and to blame Kato for her actions if she's arrested. Following the assault, Suzu calmly picks up the gun, shoots the Godfather and tries to kill herself as well, but can't bring herself to. Breaking down in tears, she cries out for her dead husband.

At home, drunk, Mayu remembers events from ten years ago. Assaulted in an alley during a storm, Mayu is rescued by Yamabe, at that time a stranger who just happened to be passing by. While she cowers, he fights off all three of her attackers, stabbing one of them to death with their own knife. When Mayu declines his help getting home, he leaves her in the alley. Back in the present, we learn that Yamabe's mother couldn't handle the accusations made against him because of this rescue and hanged herself because of them. Mayu feels solely responsible for all the pain Yamabe and his family have experienced since then and cannot move past the events in the alley. Mayu is stirred from her memories by another missed call from Mommy, this one to tell her that a hit has been scheduled for that night.

Yazaki has convinced Toyo to buy his failing club off him. So, Toyo heads to Yokohama to complete the purchase, despite warnings from Yamabe that he is still in danger.

Mayu sobers herself up with a bowl full of ice water and retrieves a gun from her freezer, defrosting it in her microwave. After a pause, she takes a frozen meal out of her freezer as well and places that in the microwave alongside the gun. Once the meal has been eaten, Mayu prepares and then leaves for her mission, leaving her hipflask behind.

In Yokohama, Yazaki shows an impressed Toyo around the club before Toyo requests a discounted price for it. Suzu arrives at the club and, spotting Toyo at the top of the club's entrance stairs, she tries to shoot him, though Yamabe tackles her before she can. Trying to escape, Toyo and one of his guards run into Mayu, who beats up the guard and then shoots Toyo. Yamabe runs in after them, having heard the shot, and Mayu goes to fight him, but pauses when she sees who it is. Yamabe swings at her repeatedly, but she dodges him each time and then flees as Yazaki approaches.

With Toyo dead, Yazaki takes over Toyo's hospital and keeps his club, accusing Yamabe of planning this hit on Toyo. Yazaki kicks Yamabe out of the newly expanded Yazaki gang for this and Yamabe plots revenge. Finding some men violently interrogating a naked Suzu in an operating room of the hospital, Yamabe starts by fighting them. Almost over-powered, Yamabe is saved by another gang member sympathetic to his cause, who then instructs Yamabe to rough him up, so as not to arouse suspicion. Yamabe does this and escapes with Suzu on his back. One of the men Yamabe beat up, although appearing knocked out, actually hears this final exchange.

In an attempt to steal Toyo's money from Yazaki, Mayu is captured and all but one of her weapons is taken from her. Pulling a pistol from between her breasts, Mayu starts shooting Yazaki's men before fleeing the hospital with the money. Yamabe, now in a car, passes Mayu on the street and offers her a lift, which she accepts.

While driving, Yamabe compliments Mayu's skills as a hitwoman and tells her that Yazaki likely intended to kill her instead of paying her. Suzu, sat in the backseat of the car next to Mayu, appears traumatised and learns that Mayu took her revenge for her by killing Toyo.

The gang member who helped Yamabe is found out and killed by Yazaki gang members.

Yamabe and the two women reach Suzu's florists and take shelter inside. Suzu updates Shin on what has happened via a shrine she's built in the florists, explaining that he can rest in peace now. She then passes out from fever and Mayu cares for her. Yamabe expresses guilt for accidentally killing Shin while trying to shoot Mayu and suggests they both pray to Shin's shrine.

Once done, Mayu offers to help Yamabe and is shocked to learn he's an alcoholic. He offers her a drink from his hipflask and she accepts. Mayu sits beside him and drinks, while Yamabe wonders whether Shin brought the three of them together from beyond the grave. He discusses how his life changed forever ten years ago, unaware that Mayu was the woman he saved. He admits he initially blamed that woman for his suffering, but the beauty of her eyes eventually softened his heart. Toyo's father took Yamabe under his wing and now both Toyo and his father are dead, Yamabe has no further connections to gang life. Mayu asks him what happened to the girl he saved and Yamabe tells her she was called Mayu and looked much like the Black Angel. Mayu then asks why Yamabe helped her after she had killed his boss, but he has fallen into a drunken stupor and is unable to answer. Tears in her eyes, Mayu falls asleep with her head on Yamabe's shoulder. This causes Yamabe to wake back up and notice the scar above her left eyebrow. Only now does Yamabe realise Mayu, the Black Angel, is the girl he saved a decade ago.

Mayu is awoken by a sound outside the florists and, though initially embarrassed for falling asleep against Yamabe, soon turns her focus to the potential threat, telling Yamabe to get Suzu to safety. He instead follows her into the front of the florists, where a truck crashes through into the store. Suzu has awoken at the sound of this and is horrified by what's happened to her store.

The three exit the store into a rainy side street and see a car driving towards them. Mayu pushes the others out of the way and shoots the driver, but this doesn't stop the car moving and it hits Mayu. She rolls over the top of the car and falls back onto the street where Yamabe and Suzu rush to check on her. Yazaki and his men arrive and reveal to Suzu that Yamabe killed her husband. Yazaki non-fatally shoots Yamabe and then Yamabe gives his gun to Suzu, telling her she should kill him for what he's done. Before Suzu can do this, however, Mayu awakens and shoots Yazaki and most of his men. While the surviving gang members flee, a wounded Yazaki begs for mercy. Mayu tells Suzu that it's Yazaki who should be shot, not Yamabe. Suzu can't bring herself to do so though and, as his final act, Yamabe takes his gun back off her and kills Yazaki himself before collapsing onto the street.

Picking up another gun, Suzu once again considers trying to avenge her husband by shooting Yamabe before he can die, but can't bring herself to do this either. Mayu holds Suzu off long enough for Yamabe to pass, before Suzu pushes past her and hopelessly begs Yamabe not to die. As Suzu weeps for her husband once more, Mayu can do nothing but listen to her suffering.

== See also ==
- Kuro no tenshi Vol. 1
