= Megumi Yokoyama (actress) =

Japanese actress (born 1969)

- 横山 めぐみ
- Born: 2 September 1969 (age 56); Toshima, Tokyo, Japan
- Occupation: Actress
- Years active: 1987–present
- Agent: Production Ogi
- Television: Kita no Kuni kara '87 Hatsukoi; Shinju Fujin
- Relatives: Tomohiko Yokoyama (older brother)

Megumi Yokoyama (横山 めぐみ, Yokoyama Megumi; born 2 September 1969, in Toshima, Tokyo) is a Japanese actress represented by Production Ogi.

== Biography ==
Yokoyama graduated from Tokyo Metropolitan Takehaya Senior High School and Aoyama Gakuin University Faculty of Letters Second Section of the Department of Education. While part of the land division of high school, she was part of Queen Bee, a copy band to the Barbee Boys and Men's Meg (from the brands Men's Viki and Megumi no Megu), a copy to Ann Lewis.

Yokoyama made her debut as Rei, the girlfriend of Jun (played by Hidetaka Yoshioka) in Kita no Kuni kara '87 Hatsukoi, and has been active in a wide range of dramas, advertisements and variety shows afterwards. She is mostly known for playing the heroine Ruriko in Shinju Fujin in 2002.

In 1995, Yokoyama married advert narrator Yasuki Okawa, but due to her popularity in Shinju Fujin she became busy and they divorced in December 2002 due to married couplings. In May 2006, she later married American Express Vice President Mamoru Ninobu.

In September 2008, Yokoyama moved to Oscar Promotion from Knockout.

In July 2021, Yokoyama moved to Production Ogi from Oscar Promotion.

It was undisputed that she was a heavy drinker. Yokoyama dislikes narcissists. She especially "hated" men who are muscular and drunk on their bodies, she had said in a variety show.

Her brother is former professional boxer Tomohiko Yokoyama.

== Filmography ==
=== TV dramas ===
Year	Title	Role	Network	Notes
1987	Kita no Kuni kara '87 Hatsukoi	Rei Osato	Fuji TV	
1990	Kawa wa Naite iru		TV Asahi	
1990	Shin Konjikiyasha: Hyakunen no Koi	Omiya	Fuji TV	
1991	Kekkon no Risō to Genjitsu	Shinobu Sano	Fuji TV	
1991	Yonimo Kimyōna Monogatari: Ma-ba-ta-ki	Mukai (Hiroshi Abe)'s lover	Fuji TV	
1991	Jitsuroku Hanzai-shi Series Kyōfu no Nijūyon Jikan – Renzoku Satsujinki Akira Nishiguchi Saigo		Fuji TV	
1991	Kekkon shinai kamo shirenai Shōkōgun	Midori Aoki	NTV	
1992	Shin Ainaru-sha e	Ruiko Mimura	Fuji TV	
1993	Double Kitchen	Shizu Hanaoka	TBS	
1993	Nakitai Yoru mo aru		MBS, TBS	Episode 10; lead role
1993	MacArthur's Children		Fuji TV	
1994	Kono Yo no Hate	Rumi Kagami	Fuji TV	
1994	Ningen-Shikkaku: Tatoeba boku ga Shindara	Natsumi Oba	TBS	
1995	For You	Miyuki Sakamoto	Fuji TV	
1995	Hito Natsu no Love Letter	Yumie Nishihara	TBS	
1996	Ai to wa Kesshite Kōkai shinai koto	Tomoko Takeuchi	TBS	
1997	Fukigen na Kajitsu	Kumi Takeda	TBS	
1997	Shokuin-shitsu	Rumiko Nodera	TBS	
1998	Nemureru Mori	Harue Tamaki	Fuji TV	
1999	Kyūkyū Heart Chiryō-shitsu	Keiko Murase	KTV	
2000	Heisei Meotojawan	Yuri	NTV	
2000	Kyōshi bin bin Monogatari	Enomoto (Hironobu Nomura)'s wife	Fuji TV	
2000	Black Jack II	Takashi's mother	TBS	
2001	Inyōshi	Noriko	NHK	
2001	Ikiru tame no Jōnetsu to shite no Satsujin	Yukari Otsuka	TV Asahi	
2002	Nurse Man ga yuku	Natsuko Kirishima	NTV	
2002	Shinju Fujin	Ruriko Shoda	THK	
2002	Mama no Idenshi	Satomi Mitani	TBS	
2003	Blackjack ni yoroshiku	Yoshiko Tanabe	TBS	
2003	Kunimitsu no Sei	Momoe (Momoyakko) Yura	KTV	
2003	Beginner	Keiko Kurosawa	Fuji TV	
2004	Proof of the Man	Fumie Koyamada	Fuji TV	
2005	Rikon Bengoshi II: Handsome Woman	Kazumi Nagano	Fuji TV	
2005	Keiji Heya	Rumi Hasegawa	TV Asahi	
2006	Suppli	Yumiko Hirano	Fuji TV	
2006	Triple Kitchen	Shizu Terada	TBS	
2007	Aibō Season 5	Toko Mizuhara	TV Asahi	
2007	Tsubasa no Oreta Tenshi-tachi	Club Mama	Fuji TV	
2007	O banzai!	Nanako Sakurai	MBS	
2007	Oedo Yoshiwara Jiken Jō	Hibari	TV Tokyo	
2008	Joshi Keimusho Higashi San-gōtō		TBS	
2008	Suite 10: Saigo no Koibito	Ruri Sawada	TBS	
2008	Kimi Hannin janai yo ne?	Miyuki Chiba	TV Asahi	Final Episode
2008	Kachō Kōsaku Shima	Reiko Shima	NTV	
2008	Mama-san Ballet de tsukamaete	Hanako	NHK	
2008	Shōni Kyūmei	Ami Uchida	TV Asahi	Episodes 5 to 7
2008	Otorisōsa-kan Shiho Kitami: Bathrobe Renzoku Satsujin		TV Asahi	
2009	Nene: Onn Taikōki	Nisshūni (Hideyoshi's sister)	TV Tokyo	
2009	Rescue: Tokubetsu Kōdo Kyūjotai		TBS	
2009	Keishichō Mitsuboshi Deka: Jotaro Sasaki		Fuji TV	
2009	Ghost Friends	Ghost Izumi	NHK	
2009	Tonari no Shibafu	Sakiko Takadaira	TBS	
2009	Ninkyō Helper	Yuri Tokuda	Fuji TV	Episode 6
2009	Maid Deka	Shoko Uno	TV Asahi	Episode 10
2009	Mitsuhiko Asami: Sai Shūshō	Namie Yoshimura	TBS	Episode 5
2010	Akakabu Kenji: Kyoto-hen	Kyoko Ayase	TBS	Episode 8
2010	Kyūkyū Kyūmei-shi: Saori Makita	Naomi Chiba	TV Asahi	
2010	Hagane no Onna	Eri Nakano	TV Asahi	
2010	Guilty: Akuma to Keiyaku shita Onna	Kotomi Osanai	KTV	
2010	Mystery Sakka Ikki Rokuura no Suiri: Hakkotsu no Goribu	Minami Kitamura	ABC	
2011	Tasogare Ryūsei-gun: C-46 Seiun	Yoko Tobishima	KTV	
2011	Sayonara boku-tachi no yo uchi e n	Satomi Kishimoto	NTV	
2011	Seiichi Morimura Suspense: Seigi no Shōmei	Saeko Fujitani	TBS	
2011	Sōsa Kenji Shigemichi Chikamatsu	Sunadaiko Fujishiro	TV Tokyo	
2012	Mō Yūkai nante shinai	Mayuko Arai	Fuji TV	
2012	Taira no Kiyomori	Mikage	NHK	
2012	Renai Neet: Wasureta Koi no Hajimekata	Taeko Saito	TBS	Episodes 6 and 7
2012	Sōmatō Kabushikigaisha	Hiroko Seki	TBS	Episode 1
2012	Nemureru Mori no Jukujo		NHK	
2012	Tsumi kikuzushi: Sai Shūshō	Saori Kikuchi	Fuji TV	
2012	Miyuki Miyabe Mystery: Perfect Blue	Akie Aso	TBS	Episode 8
2013	Nageki no Bijo	Reiko Sawayama	NHK BS Premium	
2013	Counter no futari: Season 2	Mayumi Sawamura	TwellV	Episode 13
2013	Biblia Kosho-dō no Jiken Techō	Naomi Kayama	Fuji TV	Episode 10
2013	Garo: Yami o Terasu Mono	Namiso	TV Tokyo	
2013	35-sai no Koukousei	Yuki Mayuzumi	NTV	
2013	Nekozamurai	Oshizuka	To-Mei-Han Net 6, 5 issho 3 channel	
2013	Jikken Deka Totori 2	Chisato Otsubo	NHK	Episode 3
2013	Yorozu Uranai Sho: Onmyō-ya e yōkoso	Teruko Tadano	Fuji TV	Episode 10
2014	Nezumi, Edo o Hayaru	Oshima	NHK	Episode 3
2014	Kosuke Kindaichi Vs Kogoro Akechi futatabi	Kayo Ryujo	Fuji TV	
2014	Gyakuten Hōdō no Onna	Marine	ABC	
2015	Seicho Matsumoto: Kuroi Gashū –Kusa–	Yoko Asashima	TV Tokyo	
2015	Nenriki Kazoku	Sei Nenriki	NHK-E	
2016	Suna no Tō: Shiri sugita Rinjin	Hiroko Omonesho	TBS	
2022	Invisible	Fumie Hayasaka	TBS	Episode 7

=== Films ===
Year	Title	Role	Notes
1987	Genji Monogatari	Murasaki no Jō	Voice
1990	Uchū no hōsoku	Miki	
1993	Evil Dead Trap 3: Broken Love Killer		
1995	Gonin	Namy	
2008	All Around Us	Wealthy mother	
2008	Ichi	Touma's mother	
2009	Wakaranai Where Are You?		
2011	Unfair 2: The Answer		
2014	Nekozamurai	Oshizuka	

=== Stage ===
Year	Title
2008	Dōgen no Bōken

=== Other TV programmes ===
Year	Title	Network	Notes
	SMAP×SMAP	Fuji TV	
2009	Somewhere Street	NHK	Narrator
2009	Kiseki no Chikyū Monogatari: Kin Mirai Sōzō Science	TV Asahi	Guest narrator

=== Advertisements ===
Year	Title	Notes
1992	Central Japan Railway Company "Cinderella Express"	
1994	Unicharm	
1996	Procter & Gamble Pantene	
1999	House Foods Curry Select	
2000	Nintendo Mario Tennis	
2000	Nintendo Mario Tennis GB	
2002	Otsuka Foods Kaori Tatsu Curry	
2009	Yamasa Konbu pon Su "Meromero"	As a shopping housewife
