= Angel Guts: Red Classroom =

Angel Guts: Red Classroom may refer to:

- Angel Guts: Red Classroom (film), a 1979 Japanese erotic film
- Angel Guts: Red Classroom (album), a 2014 album by Xiu Xiu
