= Gonin =

- Film poster for Gonin
- Directed by: Takashi Ishii
- Written by: Takashi Ishii
- Produced by: Katsuhide Motoki; Taketo Niitsu; Takuto Niizu
- Starring: Takeshi Kitano; Kōichi Satō; Masahiro Motoki; Jinpachi Nezu; Kippei Shiina
- Cinematography: Yasushi Sasakibara
- Edited by: Akimasa Kawashima
- Music by: Goro Yasukawa
- Distributed by: Shochiku
- Release date: 23 September 1995 (Japan)
- Running time: 109 minutes
- Country: Japan
- Language: Japanese

Gonin (Japanese: ゴニン (５人) or, in some English-language editions, The Five) is a 1995 crime film directed by Takashi Ishii and starring Takeshi Kitano, Kōichi Satō and Masahiro Motoki. This was the first film Kitano starred in after his 1994 motorcycle accident. The eyepatch the character wears was because his right eye was still leaking fluids. The film was followed by a sequel, Gonin Saga, in 2015.

== Plot ==
Bandai (Sato) is a disco owner whose business, following the collapse of Japan's bubble economy, is slowly disintegrating, and who owes debts he cannot possibly pay to the local yakuza. His solution is to rob the gangsters, for which purpose he assembles a team consisting of other casualties of the economic downturn—including Junichi Mitsuya, a gay hustler (Motoki) who frequents his club, Kaname Hizu, a down-on-his-luck ex-cop (Jinpachi Nezu), Ogiwara, an unbalanced salaryman (Naoto Takenaka), and Jimmy, a Thai pimp (Kippei Shiina). The hastily planned heist goes off awkwardly, and the yakuza start tracking down the conspirators, hiring a team of hitmen (Kitano and Kazuya Kimura) to take out the thieves.

Jimmy and his girlfriend, Nammy, are caught by the yakuza attempting to flee to Thailand with passports. Jimmy is tortured for information, while Nammy is raped and killed. The yakuza manage to get Bandai's disco out of him, where they find information on the rest of the heist team. They hire two hitmen, Shibata and Kyoya, who kill Jimmy when he confronts them. Ogiwara goes home, where it is revealed he killed his wife and children some time ago. He is killed by the two hitmen, who have a sadomasochistic relationship.

The hitmen try to kill Hizu while he is at a restaurant with his family. He escapes, but they kill his wife and child in the process. While attempting to catch a bus to Iida, Bandai and Mitsuya are warned by Hizu. They are ambushed by the hitmen shortly afterwards, who manage to kill Bandai.

As revenge for Bandai's death, Mitsuya goes back to the yakuza office, where he manages to kill them all, as well as Shibata. While attempting to take the bus, Mitsuya is found by Kyoya, and the two shoot and kill each other.

== Cast ==
- Kōichi Satō as Mikihiko Bandai
- Masahiro Motoki as Junichi Mitsuya
- Jinpachi Nezu as Kaname Hizu
- Kippei Shiina as Jimmy
- Naoto Takenaka as Shohei Ogiwara
- Megumi Yokoyama as Nammy
- Eiko Nagashima as Saki
- Maiko Kawakami as Hostess at Pinky
- Hideo Murota as Shikine
- Kazuya Kimura as Kazuma Shibata
- Shingo Tsurumi as Shigeru Hisamatsu
- Toshiyuki Nagashima as Yasumasa Ogoshi
- Takeshi Kitano as Ichiro Kyoya
