= Mari Shirato =

Japanese actress (born 1958)

- Born: December 24, 1958 (age 67); Iizuka, Fukuoka, Japan
- Occupation: Actress

Mari Shirato (白都真理, Shirato Mari) (born December 24, 1958, in Iizuka, Fukuoka, Japan) is a Japanese actress. She won the award for Best Actress at the 6th Yokohama Film Festival for Mermaid Legend.

== Filmography ==
- Mermaid Legend (1984)
