= Kei Marimura =

Japanese singer, actress, and author (born 1957)

- 真梨邑ケイ
- Born: August 29, 1957 (age 68); Chiyoda, Tokyo, Japan
- Height: 1.65 m (5 ft 5 in)

Kei Marimura (Japanese: 真梨邑ケイ, Hepburn: Marimura Kei) is a Japanese jazz singer, actress, author, gravure model, and AV idol.

== Life and career ==
Kei Marimura was born on August 29, 1957, in Chiyoda ward, Tokyo. Graduating from the Shōei Joshi Gakuin Junior and Senior High School, she made her debut as a jazz singer in 1982 through the Toho College of Music.

She also worked as an actress, appearing in many movies, TV-dramas and V-Cinema releases. In 2009, at 52, she made her debut as an AV actress with the label Alice Japan.

In 2011 she released her first novel, Intimacy (インティマシー).

== Discography ==
=== Album ===
- Elegance (1982, Disco-Mate, DSP-4006)
- Mood Indigo (1982, Disco-Mate, DSP-4007)
- The man I love (1983, Disco-Mate, DSP-5118)
- P.S. I Love you (1983, Teichiku / Continental, DSP-5120)
- Beautiful Dreamer (live, 1984, Disco-Mate, DSP-5121)
- Tiempo de Amor (1985, Continental, CI-40)
- La Califusa (1986, Continental, CI-41)
- Nouveau (1991, Teichiku, TECN-28082)
- Mucho Mucho (1992, Teichiku, TECN-30194)
- ブリリアント・ベスト (Best of, 2010, Teichiku, TECN-30211/2)

== Filmography ==
=== Movies ===
- Mysterious Country Japan (ふしぎな国日本, 1982)
- Yasha (夜叉, 1985)
- The most dangerous criminal (もっともあぶない刑事, 1989)
- Death Subeshi beast (野獣死すべし, 1997)
- Moonlight Whispers (月光の囁き, 1998)
- Girl came from the sea – Mermaid (マーメイド～海から来た少女, 2001), also written and directed
- Midday Flowers (真昼の花, 2005), singing

=== V-Cinema ===
- Only evil (悪人専用, 1990)
- Symphony of the sensual wife Karuizawa (軽井沢夫人 官能の夜想曲, 1996)
- XX: Beautiful Prey (XX 美しき獲物, 1996)
- Women (id., 1997)
- Another XX (アナザーXX, 1998)
- Ecstasy (エクスタシー, 2001)
- Red Spider (赤蜘蛛, 2004)

=== Gravure video ===
- Shangai Rapsodhy (Bauhaus, 2002)
- Aventure (2004)

=== Adult video ===
- Jyoji (September 25, 2009, Alice JAPAN)
- Jyoji II (March 12, 2010, Alice JAPAN)
- Lady Stockings (November 12, 2010, Alice JAPAN)
- Tokyo nightclub – Jyoji Beginning (November 11, 2011, Alice JAPAN)

=== Web series ===
- Easy seeing (I have seen!) (見参楽（みさんが！）, 2011, DOUGA/Fuji TV)

== Television ==
- At night the mood (夜は気分で, 1982–1983) – Host
- We're funny family (オレたちひょうきん族, 1982–1983)
- Our first experience of wives (妻たちの初体験, 1986)
- Metropolitan at 25 (大都会25時, 1987)
- Tetsuko Room (徹子の部屋, 1987)
- One photograph (一枚の写真, 1991)
- Autumn murderer (秋の殺人者, 1995)
- Good Luck (グッドラック, 1996)
- Witch legend (鬼女伝説, 2003)
- Stay at the countryside! (田舎に泊まろう!, 2008)
- BS-TBS Imperial Jazz 2009 (2009)

== Radio ==
- Jazz Monthly wide (マンスリージャズワイド, TBS Radio)
- I Love NY

== Bibliography ==
- Intimacy (インティマシー, 2011, Tokuma Shoten) ISBN 4-19-863128-X

=== Photo books ===
- ドレス
- Imprevu
- Speak Low
- Higher Self
- R指定
- 軽蔑
- BLACK BOX
- 上海ラプソディー
- Pandora
