= Kei Fujiwara =

Japanese actress, director and cinematographer

- Born: March 12, 1957 (age 69); Kumamoto, Japan
- Occupations: Actress, cinematographer, screenwriter, film director, theater director
- Years active: 1973–present
- Notable work: Tetsuo: The Iron Man (1989); Organ (1996); Ido (Id) (2005)

Kei Fujiwara (Japanese: 不二稿 京, Hepburn: Fujiwara Kei; born March 12, 1957) is a Japanese actress, cinematographer, director, and screenwriter. Her first role was in the American film The Neptune Factor, but she is perhaps best known for starring in the Japanese cyberpunk cult film Tetsuo: The Iron Man. More recently she has devoted her time to writing and directing, and is known for her surreal and violent experimental films as well as her experimental theater company Organ Vital.

== Biography ==
Fujiwara was born into a poor family in a rural part of Kumamoto in 1957, and moved to Tokyo in her early twenties to pursue a career in theater. Playwright Jūrō Kara wrote roles for her to act in his plays and eventually became her mentor. She spent years creating underground theater companies, and collaborated with Shinya Tsukamoto in the 1980s on the plays and 8 mm films he created. Becoming closely involved with Tsukamoto's underground theater troupe Kaijyu Theater, she took on the title of his "right hand" woman and played a contributing role in his films The Phantom of Regular Size (1986), The Adventure of Denchu Kozo (1987), and Tetsuo: The Iron Man (1989). For Tsukamoto's film Tetsuo: The Iron Man, she participated both in front of the camera as the unnamed Girlfriend character, as well as behind the camera as the prop artist and one of the cinematographers. In addition, Fujiwara's apartment was used as a primary set for the film, with her cats even appearing in certain scenes. She also created Tetsuo's emblematic phallic drill, which would come to be synonymous with the themes of the film.

After the production of Tetsuo, she returned to underground theater and working with Jūrō Kara. She also formed the Organ Vital company, which produced the play Organ and adapted the play into the film of the same name. When interviewed, Fujiwara has said that the name "Organ Vital" comes from an Antonin Artaud book

"...that featured this French term. It meant the vessels of life. When translated to English, I'm told it just becomes, 'vitals of organ,' or something, but in Japanese it is called gozōroppu and to me signifies the corporal. That's the name of my theater company, and it has always been that for me. Born into this three-dimensional world with bodies, we sense and express."

Fujiwara returned again as a film actress in Organ, playing the role of Yoko, the eye-patch wearing sister of organ dealer and high school biology teacher Jun. Notably, Fujiwara has stated that her directorial process is very theatrical, forgoing multiple takes. When shooting Organ, her actors would have to buy their own film if a retake was necessary. This lent an intensity and focus to the shooting process, as no one could afford to buy their own film. In addition, Fujiwara adopted a budget conscious production style for many of the sets and props in the film, including the warehouse and organs shown in the opening scene. "We used real food. We took some gelatin- and konjac-noodles and thought, “This can look like veins!”

Organ and her later 2005 film Id never gained financial or critical success, but have become noted examples of the Japanese horror genre. Upon its release, Id opened at Fujiwara's Strange Underground Cavern - Blue Miracle (Fushigi chitei kutsu - ao no kiseki) establishment in Tokyo, while a 93-minute version of the movie was screened in competition at the Yubari International Fantastic Film Festival (Yûbari Kokusai Fantasutikku Eigasai) in Hokkaido of the same year.

Fujiwara currently continues to produce theatre work through Organ Vital: a new "nomadic" theatre project called Ibunkitan debuted in 2019, and has been presented in shops, salons, and temples. She lives in a remote part of the Nagano mountains and operates a cat shelter in her spare time.

== Style and themes ==
Fujiwara's work deals with themes of morality, spirituality, fear, pain, bodily transformation and decay, and pleasure. Her films are known for their graphic depiction of gore and violence and their surreal, experimental style. When interviewed about her work, she has stated that Organ explores conventions surrounding morality and societal regulations.

"When I think about seimeikan—our view of life—it appears to me that the moral judgment of good versus bad is not something universal, but just a rule that protects our lifestyle in society...The concept of zen-aku, or the notion of good and evil, is just a societal regulation. The police represent upholders of this regulation. And then there are those who defy this regulation, who lie in a realm completely different from this conventional morality. Organ is a clash between these two groups."

Similarly, Id examines the psychology of the subconscious mind, blending body horror with hatred, sorrow, and primal desires.

In regards to her determination to impart both pleasure and pain to the audience through her work, she expresses,

"I think humans, in order to live, can't cut those away from existence. If you deny desire, you're not human. The existence of such things causes our misery, too. Thus, desire and slaughter are inescapable. My fear and sorrow regarding this, and my questioning what are they anyway. That's what I wanted to portray."

She cites the work of Buddhist novelist Kenji Miyazawa and manga artists Osamu Tezuka, Sanpei Shirato, and Daijiro Morohoshi as being influential to her creative worldview.

== Filmography ==
As actress

- The Neptune Factor (1973)
- Denchu Kozo No Boken (The Adventure of Denchu Kozo) (1987)
- Tetsuo: The Iron Man (1989)
- Organ (1996)
- Ido (Id) (2005)
- Hana-Dama: The Origin (2014)

As director

- Organ (1996)
- Ido (Id) (2005)

As cinematographer

- Tetsuo: The Iron Man (1989)
- Organ (1996)
- Ido (Id) (2005)

As screenwriter

- Organ (1996)
- The Phantom of Regular Size (1986)
- Ido (2005)

As costume designer

- Denchu Kozo No Boken (The Adventure of Denchu Kozo) (1987)
- Tetsuo: The Iron Man (1989)
