= Organ (film) =

1996 Japanese horror film by Kei Fujiwara

- Promotional release poster
- Directed by: Kei Fujiwara
- Written by: Kei Fujiwara
- Produced by: Kei Fujiwara; Binbun Furusawa; Koichi Toda
- Starring: Kei Fujiwara; Kimihiko Hasegawa; Yosiaki Maekawa; Kenji Nasa
- Cinematography: Kei Fujiwara
- Edited by: Kenji Nasa
- Music by: Kenji Nasa
- Release date: July 6, 1996
- Running time: 110 minutes (102 for the Japanese theatrical release)
- Country: Japan
- Language: Japanese

Organ (オルガン, Orugan) is a 1996 Japanese horror film written, directed and produced by Kei Fujiwara. She also stars in it as one of two organ thieves who remove organs from their captives while they are still alive. It is known for its excessive gore and violence.

== Plot ==
Two undercover detectives, Numata and Tosaka, infiltrate a plastic covered den where they discover a gang of organ thieves including Saeki and his sister Yoko (Kei Fujiwara), who are in the middle of cutting open a coma patient. Tosaka blows Numata's cover and a gun battle ensues, with Saeki injecting Numata and escaping. He stumbles around the streets in a daze and takes the fall for the operation going south. Tosaka is captured.

Saeki works as a researcher at a school where he sometimes murders schoolgirls. We learn later that Saeki's mother attacked his genitals when he was young and stabbed out Yoko's eye. Yoko tries to defend the two of them from the police, as well as the organ thieves' yakuza bosses who are not happy with the sudden attention. Tosaka's identical twin leads the other police officers in a search to find his brother, but when they finally find him, he's been turned into a mutated torso as a result of Saeki's experiments.

== Production ==
After working on the production of Tetsuo: The Iron Man, Kei Fujiwara formed an experimental theater company called the Organ Vital company, which produced a play called Organ. The company then adapted the play into the film Organ.

The cast pooled together their savings to buy the film stock and lights, borrowed camera equipment from friends, and also filled all the technical roles themselves. The sets were constructed using free materials they foraged. Fujiwara only allowed one take for each shot, unless there was a technical error. She told the actors that they could do more takes if they paid for the additional film footage, knowing full well that the actors couldn't afford that; she says this helped the actors focus on getting the best performance the very first time.

== Release ==
The film screened at the 1996 Toronto International Film Festival and the Vancouver International Film Festival. For the Japanese release of the film, Eirin ordered eight minutes of the film to be cut out. Foreign distributors instead released the full 110 minute version of the film.

== Reception ==
The film has seen generally negative reception from English critics. Derek Elley of Variety compared the film to the Japanese film Tetsuo: The Iron Man stating that "where 'Tetsuo' had a cartoonish energy, 'Organ' is an increasingly limp farrago of body make up and ketchup. Fujiwara makes an impression as the bizarre one-eyed amazon, but her role, like all others, is undeveloped." Time Out London wrote that "Diminishing returns hit splatter movies faster than most other genres, and this starts straining for effect and repeating itself within its first hour". Jason Gibner of Allmovie awarded the film three stars and wrote that though the film "can often be impossible to watch, the overall bizarre nature of the film will hook some viewers who want to discover where this twisted gore fest will go next."
