= Mermaid Legend =

- DVD cover
- Directed by: Toshiharu Ikeda
- Screenplay by: Takuya Nishioka
- Starring: Mari Shirato; Jun Etō; Kentarō Shimizu; Seiji Miyaguchi; Junko Miyashita; Yoshirō Aoki
- Cinematography: Yonezou Maeda
- Music by: Toshiyuki Honda
- Production company: Director's Company
- Distributed by: ATG
- Release date: April 14, 1984 (Japan)
- Running time: 110 minutes
- Country: Japan
- Language: Japanese

Mermaid Legend (Japanese: 人魚伝説, Hepburn: Ningyo Densetsu) is a 1984 Japanese film directed by Toshiharu Ikeda. The film won three awards at the 6th Yokohama Film Festival.

== Synopsis ==
When a fisherman stands in the way of an industrial scheme, the business developers have him murdered. His wife Migiwa, a pearl diver, plots to avenge his death.

== Cast ==
- Mari Shirato as Migiwa Saeki
- Jun Etō (江藤潤) as Saeki Keisuke
- Kentarō Shimizu as Miyamoto Shouhei
- Seiji Miyaguchi as Tatsuo
- Junko Miyashita as Natsukoß
- Yoshirō Aoki (青木義朗) as Terumasa Miyamoto
- Takashi Kanda (神田隆) as Lawyer Hanaoka
- Hiroko Seki (関弘子) as Nobu

== Awards and nominations ==
6th Yokohama Film Festival.

- Won: Best Director - Toshiharu Ikeda
- Won: Best Actress - Mari Shirato
- Won: Best Cinematography - Yonezou Maeda
- 4th Best Film
