= XX: Beautiful Prey =

- DVD cover
- Directed by: Toshiharu Ikeda
- Written by: Tamiya Takebashi; Setsu Yamaguchi
- Produced by: Norio Hattori; Makoto Okadaakoto Okada
- Starring: Kei Marimura; Makiko Watanabe; Ren Ōsugi
- Distributed by: Toei Video
- Release date: 1996
- Running time: 99 minutes
- Language: Japanese

XX: Beautiful Prey (Japanese: ＸＸ 美しき獲物, Hepburn: XX: Utsukushiki emono) is a 1996 Japanese film directed by Toshiharu Ikeda. The film stars Kei Marimura, Makiko Watanabe and Ren Ōsugi. The film was licensed in the US by Central Park Media and was released on DVD and VHS under their Asia Pulp Cinema label.

== Plot ==
An undercover policewoman investigating a gruesome murder gets caught up in the underground BDSM world.

== Cast ==
- Kei Marimura as Yu
- Makiko Watanabe as Noriko
- Ren Ōsugi as Tagami
- Minori Terada as Miyamoto
- Atsushi Okuno

=== English voice cast ===
The English dubbing was produced at Audioworks Producers Group in New York City.

- Marcia May as Yu
- Jessica Calvello as Noriko
- Vincent Bagnall as Tagami
- Michael D'R' as Miyamoto
- Mike James as Saito
- Prairie Silva Sabino as Nurse
- Barry Banner

== See also ==
- Naked Killer
