= Takashi Ishii (film director) =

Japanese film director (1946–2022)

- Born: 11 July 1946; Sendai, Japan
- Died: 22 May 2022 (aged 75)
- Occupation(s): Film director, screenwriter, manga artist

Takashi Ishii (石井隆, Ishii Takashi, 11 July 1946 – 22 May 2022) was a Japanese film director, screenwriter and manga artist. He directed several pinku eiga erotic films, but his most notable feature was the 1995 crime thriller Gonin starring Takeshi Kitano.

== Filmography ==
Year	Title	Director	Writer	Notes
1979	Angel Guts: Red Classroom	No	Yes	Directed by Chūsei Sone
1979	Angel Guts: Nami	No	Yes	Directed by Noboru Tanaka
1981	Angel Guts: Red Porno	No	Yes	Directed by Toshiharu Ikeda
1982	Girl And The Wooden Horse Torture	No	Yes	Directed by Fumihiko Katō
1984	Rope Sisters: Strange Fruit	No	Yes	Directed by Shun Nakahara
1984	Rouge	No	Yes	Directed by Hiroyuki Nasu
1985	Love Hotel	No	Yes	Directed by Shinji Sōmai
1985	Dream Crimes	No	Yes	Directed by Naosuke Kurosawa
1985	Scent of a Spell	No	Yes	Directed by Toshiharu Ikeda
1986	Saya: Perspective in Love	No	Yes	Directed by Seiji Wada
1987	Angel Guts: Red Rope - "Until I Expire!"	No	Yes	Directed by Junichi Suzuki
1988	Evil Dead Trap	No	Yes	Directed by Toshiharu Ikeda
1988	Angel Guts: Red Vertigo	Yes	Yes	
1991	Goddamn!!	No	Yes	Directed by Futoshi Kamino
1991	Orchids Under the Moon	Yes	Yes	
1992	Original Sin	Yes	Yes	
1993	A Night in Nude	Yes	Yes	
1993	Evil Dead Trap 3: Broken Love Killer	No	Yes	Directed by Toshiharu Ikeda
1994	Alone in the Night	Yes	Yes	
1994	Angel Guts: Red Lightning	Yes	Yes	
1995	Gonin	Yes	Yes	
1996	Gonin 2	Yes	Yes	
1998	Black Angel	Yes	Yes	
1999	Black Angel Vol. 2	Yes	Yes	
2000	Freeze Me	Yes	Yes	
2004	Flower and Snake	Yes	Yes	
2005	Flower and Snake 2	Yes	Yes	
2007	The Brutal Hopelessness of Love	Yes	Yes	
2010	A Night in Nude: Salvation	Yes	Yes	
2013	Hello, My Dolly Girlfriend	Yes	Yes	
2013	Sweet Whip	Yes	Yes	
2015	Gonin Saga	Yes	Yes	

== Manga works ==
1975 Inka Jigoku
1977 Nami
1978 Tenshi no Harawata
1978 Akai Kyôshitsu
1979 Yokosuka Rock
1980 Illumination
1981 Python 357
1981 Onna no Machi
1982 Kuro no Tenshi
1982 Shôjo Nami
1984 Zôge no Akuma
1985 Ishii Takashi Jisen Gekigashuu
1987 Ai no Yukue
1987 Last Waltz
1987 Yoru ni Hôho Yose
1988 Akai Memai
1989 Ame Monogatari
1989 Tsuki Monogatari
1990 Maraque
1990 Akai Tôriame
1990 Akai Yoru
1991 Amai Yoru
1991 Yoru o Furuete
1993 Nami Returns
1998 Manjushaka
2000 Cantarella no Hako
2001 Nami in Blue
