= Toshiharu Ikeda =

Japanese film director and screenwriter (1951–2010)

- Born: 23 February 1951; Yamagata, Japan
- Died: 26 December 2010 (aged 59)
- Occupations: Film director Screenwriter
- Years active: 1980–2010

Toshiharu Ikeda (池田敏春, Ikeda Toshiharu) (23 February 1951 – 26 December 2010) was a Japanese film director and screenwriter. He is best known for his films Mermaid Legend (1984) and Evil Dead Trap (1988).

Ikeda became involved in filmmaking while still a university student, working as an assistant director for a small independent production company. He joined Nikkatsu in 1974, contributing to multiple Roman Porno movies. He debuted as a director in 1980 with the movie Sukeban Mafia, and later in the same year with Sex Hunter, which the studio criticized for being too rough and vulgar. His latest movie for Nikkatsu was the 1981 Angel Guts: Red Porno. He left the company after the shooting, feeling a lack of support.

In 1982 Ikeda joined forces with other directors to found the Director's Company. His first film there was Mermaid Legend (1984), a cult movie that deals with revenge and anti-nuclear sentiment, for which he won Best Director at the 6th Yokohama Film Festival. In 1988 followed Evil Dead Trap, credited with being Japan's first modern horror.

During the 90's Ikeda worked less in theatrical films, doing mostly V-Cinema action and erotic films. His latest film was Aki Fukaki (2008), a serious drama and a departure from his usual genre films. Ikeda drowned in 2010 in the sea near Shima in the Mie Prefecture. Speculations arose of the death being a suicide, him having struggled with suicidal thoughts since youth.

== Life and career ==
=== Early career - Nikkatsu ===
Ikeda graduated from the literature department of Waseda University in 1974, but became involved in filmmaking while still a student. According to Ikeda, his entry into the film industry was accidental, the result of a drunken barroom bet. His first job was at a small independent production company, Ishihara Productions, but he later moved to the major studio Nikkatsu, which at the time produced only films of the Roman porno genre, big budget versions of the pink film. At both companies, he began working as an assistant director, whose duties could include anything from cleaning floors to shaving actresses at a time when it was illegal to show even the slightest hint of pubic hair in Japanese media. Ikeda continued as an assistant director at Nikkatsu throughout the 1970s in such films as Flower and Snake (1974), Wife to be Sacrificed (1974) and Noble Lady: Bound Vase (1977), all directed by Masaru Konuma.

Ikeda made his debut as a director at Nikkatsu with the 1980 film, Sukeban Mafia which the Weissers call "satirical, rousing, sexy and character-driven". Later in 1980, Ikeda directed his second Roman porno feature for Nikkatsu, Sex Hunter, which the studio considered too rough and vulgar. For "penance", Nikkatsu sent him to Okinawa and told him to include some romance for his next film, Blue Lagoon: A Summer Experience, which had a standard boy-girl plot. Ikeda's last project for Nikkatsu was the 1981 Angel Guts: Red Porno, the fourth film in the six part Angel Guts series. Ikeda was brought in at the last minute when the original director dropped out and had only a month to shoot the film. Ikeda had a dispute with actress Jun Izumi about a nude shot in the film and when Nikkatsu cut the scene, Ikeda left the company feeling that they had failed to support him.

=== Director's Company and Evil Dead Trap ===
After leaving Nikkatsu, Ikeda joined a number of other young directors in the Director's Company, a production company founded in 1982. Ikeda's first film with the Director's Company, distributed by the Art Theater Guild, was the 1984 Mermaid Legend. A drama with exploitation premises, based on a manga by Takashi Ishii, in which a fisherman looks for revenge, developing the intense anti-nuclear sentiment that Japan was experiencing at the time. Marmaid Legend won three awards at the 1985 Yokohama Film Festival, for best director, actress and cinematography. It is considered by many to be his finest work, a cult, contextually rich, masterpiece of the extreme. A year later, Ikeda made Scent of a Spell, also for the Director's Company, a mystery about a newspaperman who saves a girl from suicide but discovers that she may not be as innocent as she seems. The screenplay was by Takashi Ishii who had also written the scripts for the Angel Guts series while he and Ikeda were together at Nikkatsu.

Ishii also penned the script for Ikeda's 1988 Evil Dead Trap, called Japan's first "splatter movie", and credited with being the first Japanese modern horror film. Although usually said to have been influenced by Sam Raimi's The Evil Dead and the work of Dario Argento, Ikeda claimed in an interview never to have seen their films, hating horror so much that he never even watched Evil Dead Trap. He did, however, attend a showing of the film in Los Angeles when it was released for American audiences in 1999. The film was successful enough to spawn a sequel directed by Izo Hashimoto. Ikeda returned to direct Evil Dead Trap 3: Broken Love Killer (1993), again written by Ishii, but only made a sequel in name outside of Japan.

=== Later career and death ===
Through the 1990s, Ikeda did little work in theatrical films, most of his output being V-Cinema action and erotic films, including two entries in Toei Video's "XX: Beautiful" series based on the books of Arimasa Osawa, XX: Beautiful Beast (1995), the story of a Chinese hitwoman, and XX: Beautiful Prey (1996), about a female serial killer. His 1997 theatrical film The Key has become known as the first Japanese film to show full frontal female nudity after the rules against depicting pubic hair were relaxed. After a lapse of some years, Ikeda returned to theatrical films with the 2001 two-part horror movie Campus Ghost Stories (aka Shadow of the Wraith) starring sisters Hitomi Miwa and Asumi Miwa. He continued with the 2004 film The Man Behind the Scissors, which critic Jasper Sharp found a "quirky and perplexing police procedural" about a series of scissor murders. Ikeda's last film, Aki Fukaki (2008), a departure from his usual genre films, was a serious drama based on the works of Sakunosuke Oda and starred Norito Yashima and Eriko Sato.

Ikeda's body was found floating in the sea near Shima in the Mie Prefecture on 26 December 2010. He was identified in late January 2011. His death may have been from an accidental fall or suicide. In June, through his Twitter account, Ikeda had expressed a wish to die in the Shima area. He had been struggling with suicidal thoughts since being 18.

== Filmography ==
=== Theatrical films - Director ===
- Sukeban Mafia (スケバンマフィア 肉刑 リンチ, Sukeban Mafia) (Mar. 1980, Nikkatsu)
- Sex Hunter (セックスハンター 性狩人, Sex Hunter) (Oct. 1980, Nikkatsu)
- Blue Lagoon (ひと夏の体験 青い珊瑚礁, Hitonatsu no taiken: aoi sangosho) (July 1981, Nikkatsu)
- Angel Guts: Red Porno (天使のはらわた 赤い淫画, Tenshi no harawata: Akai inga) (Dec. 1981, Nikkatsu)
- Mermaid Legend (人魚伝説, Ningyo densetsu) (April 1984, Director's Company / ATG)
- Cursed Village in Yudono Mountains (湯殿山麓呪い村, Yudono-sanroku noroi mura) (May 1984, Toei Central Films)
- Scent of a Spell (魔性の香り, Masho no kaori) (Dec. 1985, Director's Company)
- Evil Dead Trap (死霊の罠, Shiryō no wana) (May 1988, JHV)
- Misty (Nov. 1991, Toho)
- Red Foliage (くれないものがたり, Kurenai monogatari) (June 1992)
- Evil Dead Trap 3: Broken Love Killer (ちぎれた愛の殺人, Chigireta ai no satsujin) (June 1993)
- The Key (鍵, Kagi) (Oct. 1997, Toei)
- Campus Ghost Stories aka Shadow of the Wraith (いきすだま 生霊, Ikisudama) (June 2001)
- The Man Behind the Scissors (ハサミ男, Hasami Otoko) (2004)
- Aki Fukaki (秋深き) (Nov. 2008)

=== V-Cinema - Director ===
- Nekketsu houkago kurabu 1 (熱血放課後クラブ(1)) (Mar. 1990)
- Nekketsu houkago kurabu 3 (熱血放課後クラブ(3)) (Mar. 1990)
- ごきぶり商事痛快譚 愛の五億円ぶるーす (Feb. 1991)
- Scorpion Woman Prisoner: Death Threat (女囚さそり 殺人予告, Joshuu sasori: Satsujin yokoku) (May 1991)
- 監禁逃亡 禁断の陵辱 (Jan. 1995)
- XX: Beautiful Beast (XX 美しき獣, XX: Utsukushiki kemono) (Sept. 1995)
- XX: Beautiful Prey (XX 美しき獲物, XX: Utsukushiki emono) (Jan. 1996)
- 監禁逃亡 性奴隷 (June 1997)
- Another XX: Matori no onna (Another XX マトリの女) (May 1998)
- 監禁逃亡 地獄に咲いた女 (May 1999)
- 無頼 人斬り五郎 (Oct. 1999)
- 暴力商売 (Apr. 2001)
- 暴力商売2 (June 2001)
- 暴力商売 金融餓狼伝 (Feb. 2002)
- 暴力商売 金融餓狼伝2 (Apr. 2002)
- Mugen jigoku: Kyōaku kin'yūdō (無間地獄 凶悪金融道) (Jan. 2003)
- Mugen jigoku: Kyōaku kin'yūdō 2 (無間地獄 凶悪金融道2) (Mar. 2003)
- Death Ryuketsu Jigoku (DEATH 流血地獄) (Oct. 2004)
- Death II Ryuketsu Jigoku (DEATH 2 流血地獄) (Dec. 2004)

== Sources ==
- Ikeda, Toshiharu. (1998). Interviewed in Asian Cult Cinema, #18.
- "池田敏春 (Ikeda Toshiharu)". Japanese Movie Database (in Japanese).
- Toshiharu Ikeda at IMDb
- Weisser, Thomas. (1998). "Asian Cult Cinema Report: Film, News and Gossip", in Asian Cult Cinema, #22, 1st Quarter, 1999, p. 4-6. (American premier of Evil Dead Trap)
