= Kuro no tenshi Vol. 1 =

1998 Japanese film

- Film poster
- Directed by: Takashi Ishii
- Written by: Takashi Ishii
- Starring: Riona Hazuki; Reiko Takashima
- Distributed by: Shochiku
- Release date: May 30, 1998 (Japan)
- Running time: 107 minutes
- Country: Japan
- Language: Japanese

Kuro no tenshi Vol. 1 (Japanese: 黒の天使 Vol.1) is a 1998 Japanese film directed and written by Takashi Ishii. The film stars Riona Hazuki and Reiko Takashima.

== Plot ==
A yakuza boss absconds from a hospital with his newly born granddaughter. As he leaves the building, he instructs his subordinate, Yasuda, to maintain the story that his granddaughter has died.

Six years later, the boss lives with a girl he claims is his daughter, Ikko, and he is expecting an attempt to be made on his life by a member of his own crime family. Yasuda, along with the boss's mistress (whom Ikko believes is her mother) and several guards have all joined the boss at his house. The boss has another daughter from a previous relationship and she is a grown woman named Chiaki. While the boss awaits the hit, Chiaki has sex with her partner, Nogi, and discusses their plan to kill her father as revenge for how he treated her mother.

Two women talk their way inside the boss' house before revealing guns and successfully killing most of the occupants, though Yasuda eventually kills one woman before escaping with Ikko. A corrupt police officer then arrives and kills the other woman before searching the house for Ikko.

Yasuda and Ikko make it away from the house by car and meet with The Black Angel, a highly skilled hitwoman. A critically injured Yasuda explains to Ikko that The Black Angel will help her escape and that, when she grows up, there will be no need for Ikko to avenge the deaths that have happened that night. More men arrive to kill them and, despite Ikko's demands that Yasuda join them in fleeing, he pushes her out of the car and proceeds to crash his car into those of the pursuing men. However, they have already all exited the vehicles. Assuming victory is imminent, the men turn around to see The Black Angel who proceeds to shoot all of them dead.

Later, at an airport, Ikko asks The Black Angel to teach her how to shoot so they can take revenge, but The Black Angel instead gives her a pendant and a ticket to LA, promising Ikko that they'll meet again one day. When asked by Ikko if she is a real angel, the hitwoman reveals her name is Mayo. Once Ikko is safely on an escalator, Mayo runs out of the airport, abandoning Ikko as the young girl calls after her.

Fourteen years later, a twenty year old Ikko returns to Tokyo wearing the same pendant Mayo gave her as a child. At a party, Ikko feigns drunkenness while searching for a member of the yakuza named Mr Kosugi. When this draws the attention of lower ranking members of Kosugi's gang, she introduces herself as The Black Angel and, with the help of a male accomplice, proceeds to kill one of the gang members. The other member runs off to warn Kosugi of this. Following the gang member back to Kosugi, Ikko bursts in, demanding to know the location of Nogi. This leads to a fight which ends with Ikko killing Kosugi and escaping. Police arrive to interview the survivors of the fight and discover a hotel matchbook at the scene, which they take as evidence. Meanwhile, Ikko and her associate interrogate other gang members, who tell her that Chiaki coerced Nogi into ordering the hit from fourteen years ago. It was the boss' intention that Ikko inherit his empire, but Chiaki wanted it for herself and she now has it. The gang member also reveals that it is understood that Ikko escaped to LA, but it's believed she's still there. When he questions how The Black Angel knew to ask about that, Ikko kills him.

The corrupt police officer, having attended the site of the fight with Kosugi and in possession of the hotel matchbook, warns Nogi of The Black Angel's return. Suspecting this is Ikko, Nogi calls Chiaki to discuss this, but she takes the call while having sex with another man, a senator. Chiaki learns of Ikko's return from Nogi, but the man she's having sex with then tells her to stop talking, so she hangs up the phone, leaving Nogi disgruntled.

Together in a hotel room late at night, Ikko tells her accomplice, Zill, how brilliant Mayo is and Zill assures Ikko she'll be successful in her search for the original Black Angel. In high spirits, the two dance together.

Nogi finds Mayo drunk in a bar and offers her high quality drugs in exchange for help killing Ikko. When Mayo doesn't respond, Nogi dumps the drugs in her drink and feigns leaving, though he waits outside the door to the bar to watch what she does. Mayo initially throws the spiked drink onto the floor in anger, but quickly regrets this and starts licking the spilled contents up off the floor. Satisfied with this outcome, Nogi leaves.

The following morning, during a swim in her private pool, Chiaki takes a call from Nogi during which she reveals that she seduced the senator to get their shared business some work permits. Nogi tries to warn Chiaki about how dangerous Ikko could be, but Chiaki is unconcerned until Ikko and Zill break into the pool area. Nogi hears this development over the phone and rushes with his men towards the pool. While Zill frolics in the pool, Chiaki tries to gain sympathy from Ikko, who is currently pointing a gun at her. Chiaki explains that she also lost a father fourteen years ago and that her mother, now deceased, had wanted Ikko to live with them instead of being sent to the USA. Chiaki admits that she lost a daughter right around the time Ikko was born, so she always felt a kinship with her and had even kept her portion of inheritance safe, should Ikko return. When Ikko hesitates to kill Chiaki, Zill gets out of the pool to argue with her in English about how they should still kill her. He even takes Ikko's gun off her to complete the task, but Ikko instinctively stops him killing Chiaki. This gives Nogi time to reach them, at which point Ikko and Zill flee. Chiaki finds herself instinctively stopping Nogi and his men from shooting at Ikko, though she can't explain why.

Ikko and Zill fall out and split up, at which point Nogi's men catch and attack Zill. He's able to kill Nogi's men and get back to Ikko at their hotel, but soon succumbs to his wounds. As Ikko mourns Zill's death, the corrupt police officer arrives at the hotel room. Holding Ikko at gunpoint, he reveals that her mother was actually a school-age rape victim whose attacker the police officer was unable to apprehend. He then tells Ikko that Nogi is on his way to Shinjuku, in hopes this will help her in her quest for revenge.

That night, Ikko travels to Shinjuku and shoots Nogi. Thinking she's killed him, Ikko tries to escape, but she's caught by Mayo, who holds her at gunpoint until Nogi and his men catch up, revealing the hit was unsuccessful. As the men drag Ikko away, she screams at Mayo that she betrayed her. Ikko tears the pendant off her outfit and throws it at Mayo. Seeing this, Mayo realises who she's just been pointing a gun at.

Nogi ties Ikko to a pillar in an abandoned hospital and interrogates her to find out how she knew his schedule. Between beatings, Nogi comments that Ikko is beautiful, just like her mother, and she calls him a coward for wearing a bulletproof vest in order to survive assassination attempts. In response to this, Nogi has her untied and dressed in the bulletproof vest before shooting her several times. When it's clear he won't shoot her again, Ikko tries to escape, but is kept from doing so by Nogi's men, who block every exit. Nogi explains that Ikko will have to kill him before she can leave. Nogi quickly knocks Ikko to the ground, then explains how they are alike and reveals that his father was a hitman. Nogi proceeds to hold Ikko down and force himself upon her while she screams.

Mayo dreams of the ways Nogi and his men tortured her back when she helped Ikko escape and then uses drugs to suppress this memory. She awakens later to an anonymous call telling her where Ikko is.

Mayo breaks into the hospital and tries to retrieve a heavily drugged Ikko, though struggles to carry her. When it looks like one of Nogi's men is going to get the upper hand, Ikko shoots him, but warns Mayo that this doesn't mean she's forgiven her.

The next day, Nogi and the corrupt police officer bring Chiaki to the hospital to show her the casualties of Mayo's rescue mission, assuming that she and Ikko did escape. Nogi is confident Ikko will track him down to try and kill him again. Once Nogi has left, Chiaki asks the police officer if Mayo is Nogi's mistress. The officer confirms not only that, but that Nogi got her addicted to dope as well. Chiaki asks the officer to kill both Mayo and Ikko and then admits she feels like she met him when she was a young girl. He assures her they met at her father's funeral. It's revealed that Mayo and Ikko were actually just hiding on a higher floor of the hospital and they only escape once everyone else has gone.

Disillusioned and suffering withdrawals, Ikko lashes out at Mayo once they're safe in Mayo's home. However, Mayo calmly supports her through this, suggesting they should move far away together once this is all over.

The corrupt police officer tracks the two freshly sober women down and breaks into Mayo's home. Though Ikko is able to hide, he pins Mayo down and complains to her about his position in life. He admits that he found the school-age rape victim from twenty years ago very attractive and reveals that she was Chiaki. As he helped Chiaki's father, the yakuza boss, hide the pregnancy that resulted from this rape, the police officer expected to be compensated by getting to date Chiaki and eventually become the boss' heir. Refusing to believe that Chiaki could be her mother, Ikko exits her hiding spot and kills the police officer. She and Mayo head to Chiaki's company building to complete the revenge mission.

At the company building, Ikko finds Nogi and his men and a gunfight ensues. Chiaki, trying to rest upstairs, hears the commotion and goes to investigate, finding carnage Ikko has left in her wake. Ikko chases Nogi to the rooftop of the building, where he shoots her, though not fatally. Mayo appears and fatally shoots Nogi. Chiaki reaches the rooftop just in time to see this and she rushes to Nogi's side as he dies. Distraught, Ikko asks Chiaki how she could bring her into such a cruel world. In response, Chiaki picks up Nogi's gun and turns it on Ikko. Mayo dives in front of Ikko, desperately trying to warn Chiaki that Ikko is her daughter, but is hit by the bullet Chiaki had fired and dies before she can finish delivering the message. As Mayo falls to the floor, Ikko opens fire on Chiaki, screaming about how wrong this all is.

== See also ==
- Kuro no tenshi Vol. 2
- Kuro no tenshi Vol. 1 at IMDb
