= 3rd Yokohama Film Festival =

1982 Japanese film festival edition

- Location: Yokohama Citizens Hall, Yokohama, Kanagawa, Japan
- Founded: 1980
- Festival date: 7 February 1982

The 3rd Yokohama Film Festival (第3回ヨコハマ映画祭) was held on 7 February 1982 in Yokohama Citizens Hall, Yokohama, Kanagawa, Japan.

== Awards ==
- Best Film: Something Like It
- Best New Actor: Bang-ho Cho – Gaki Teikoku, Gaki Teikoku Akutare Sensō
- Best Actor: Toshiyuki Nagashima – Enrai
- Best Actress: Maiko Kazama – Woman Who Exposes Herself
- Best New Actress:
  - Yuki Ninagawa – Crazy Fruit
  - Yoshiko Oshimi – Yarareta Onna
- Best Supporting Actor: Renji Ishibashi – Kemono-tachi no Atsui Nemuri
- Best Supporting Actress: Yūko Tanaka – Eijanaika, Edo Porn
- Best Director: Kichitaro Negishi - Enrai, Crazy Fruit
- Best New Director: Yoshimitsu Morita – Something Like It
- Best Screenplay: Haruhiko Arai – Enrai
- Best Cinematography: Shohei Ando – Enrai, Muddy River
- Best Independent Film: Afternoon Breezes
- Special Prize: Ken Takakura (Career)

== Best 10 ==
1. Something Like It
2. Crazy Fruit
3. Enrai
4. Gaki Teikoku
5. Kagero-za
6. Muddy River
7. Kofuku
8. Station
9. Honoo no Gotoku
10. Afternoon Breezes

runner-up: Woman Who Exposes Herself
