= 11th Yokohama Film Festival =

1990 film festival in Yokohama, Japan

- Location: Kannai Hall, Yokohama, Kanagawa, Japan
- Founded: 1980
- Festival date: 11 February 1990

The 11th Yokohama Film Festival (第11回ヨコハマ映画祭) was held on 11 February 1990 in Kannai Hall, Yokohama, Kanagawa, Japan.

== Awards ==
- Best Film: Dotsuitarunen
- Best New Actor: Hidekazu Akai – Dotsuitarunen
- Best Actor: Ryo Ishibashi – A Sign Days
- Best Actress: Anna Nakagawa – A Sign Days
- Best New Actress: Ayako Kawahara – Kitchen
- Best Supporting Actor: Yoshio Harada – Dotsuitarunen, Shucchō, It's Easier than Kissing
- Best Supporting Actress: Haruko Sagara – Dotsuitarunen
- Best Director: Takeshi Kitano – Violent Cop
- Best New Director: Junji Sakamoto – Dotsuitarunen
- Best Screenplay: Hiroshi Saito and Yoichi Sai – A Sign Days
- Best Cinematography: Kenji Takama – Who Do I Choose?, Misty Kid of Wind: The Glass Cape
- Special Jury Prize: Yūsaku Matsuda (Career)

== Best 10 ==
1. Dotsuitarunen
2. Violent Cop
3. A Sign Days
4. Kitchen
5. Kiki's Delivery Service
6. Yuwakusha
7. Who Do I Choose?
8. Shucchō
9. Shaso
10. Black Rain

runner-up: It's Easier than Kissing
