= 5th Yokohama Film Festival =

1984 Japanese film festival edition

- Location: Kanagawa Prefectural Youth Centre Hall, Yokohama, Kanagawa, Japan
- Founded: 1980
- Festival date: 29 January 1984

The 5th Yokohama Film Festival (第5回ヨコハマ映画祭) was held on 29 January 1984 in Kanagawa Prefectural Youth Centre Hall, Yokohama, Kanagawa, Japan.

== Awards ==
- Best Film: The Family Game
- Best Actor: Yūsaku Matsuda – The Family Game
- Best Actress: Eiko Nagashima – Ryūji
- Best New Actress:
  - Yukari Usami – Miyuki
  - Tomoyo Harada – The Girl Who Leapt Through Time
- Best Supporting Actor: Juzo Itami – The Family Game, The Makioka Sisters
- Best Supporting Actress: Misako Tanaka – Village of Doom
- Best Director: Yoshimitsu Morita – The Family Game
- Best Screenplay: Yoshimitsu Morita – The Family Game
- Best Cinematography: Yonezo Maeda – The Family Game
- Best Independent Film: - Ryūji
- Special Jury Prize: Shōji Kaneko – For his talent.
- Special Prize:
  - Haruki Kadokawa (Career)
  - Yoichi Maeda (Career)

== Best 10 ==
1. The Family Game
2. The Girl Who Leapt Through Time
3. Ryūji
4. Orecchi no Wedding
5. The Catch
6. Blow the Night!: Yoru o Buttobase
7. The Mosquito on the Tenth Floor
8. The Makioka Sisters
9. Double Bed
10. Merry Christmas, Mr. Lawrence

runner-up: P.P. Rider
