= 18th Yokohama Film Festival =

1997 film festival in Yokohama, Japan

- Location: Kannai Hall, Yokohama, Kanagawa, Japan
- Founded: 1980
- Festival date: 2 February 1997

The 18th Yokohama Film Festival (第18回ヨコハマ映画祭) was held on 2 February 1997 in Kannai Hall, Yokohama, Kanagawa, Japan.

== Awards ==
- Best Film: Kids Return
- Best Actor:
  - Tadanobu Asano – Picnic, Focus, Helpless, Acri
  - Kōji Yakusho – Shall We Dance?, Sleeping Man, Shabu Gokudō
- Best Actress: Eri Fukatsu – Haru
- Best Supporting Actor: Ryo Ishibashi – Kids Return
- Best Supporting Actress: Reiko Kusamura – Shall We Dance?
- Best Director: Masayuki Suo – Shall We Dance?
- Best New Director: Sabu – Dangan Runner
- Best Screenplay: Yoshimitsu Morita – Haru
- Best Cinematography: Katsumi Yanagishima – Kids Return
- Best New Talent:
  - Masanobu Andō – Kids Return
  - Chara – Picnic, Swallowtail Butterfly
  - Tamiyo Kusakari – Shall We Dance?
- Special Jury Prize: Kaizo Hayashi – The Most Terrible Time in My Life, The Stairway to the Distant Past, and The Trap
- Special Prize: Tetsuya Watari – Waga Kokoro no Ginga Tetsudō: Miyazawa Kenji Monogatari (Career)

== Best 10 ==
1. Kids Return
2. Shall We Dance?
3. Boys Be Ambitious
4. Haru
5. Biriken
6. Tokiwa: The Manga Apartment
7. O-higara mo yoku, go shūshō sama
8. Shabu Gokudō
9. Gamera 2: Attack of Legion
10. Okaeri

runner-up: Swallowtail Butterfly
