= House of Wedlock =

- DVD cover

Japanese name
- Kana: ウホッホ探険隊
Transcriptions
- Revised Hepburn: Uhohho tankentai
- Directed by: Kichitaro Negishi
- Written by: Yoshimitsu Morita
- Produced by: Susumu Miyasaka; Yutaka Okada; Tsutomu Yamamoto
- Starring: Yukiyo Toake; Kunie Tanaka; Masatoshi Murakami; Shinji Motoyama; Mariko Fuji
- Cinematography: Osame Maruike
- Edited by: Akimasa Kawashima
- Music by: Saeko Suzuki
- Production companies: Director's Company; New Century Producers (NCP)
- Distributed by: Toho
- Release date: October 18, 1986 (Japan)
- Running time: 105 minutes
- Country: Japan
- Language: Japanese

House of Wedlock a.k.a. Hour of Wedlock (Japanese: ウホッホ探険隊, Hepburn: Uhohho tankentai; lit. "Ooh! Exploration Party") is a 1986 Japanese film directed by Kichitaro Negishi.

== Plot ==
Tokiko Enomoto finds out that her husband Kazuya, who mostly lives at an apartment near his work while she and their children live at home, has been having an affair with a live-in mistress, Ryōko, at his apartment. Tokiko tells her two sons, Tarō and Jirō, that she has decided to divorce their father. The children are shocked but understand their mother's position. Kazuya realizes the damage he has done and tries to remedy the situation.

== Cast ==
- Yukiyo Toake as Tokiko Enomoto
- Kunie Tanaka as Kazuya Enomoto
- Masatoshi Murakami (村上雅俊) as Tarō Enomoto
- Shinji Motoyama (本山真二) as Jirō Enomoto
- Mariko Fuji (藤真利子) as Ryōko
- Saburō Tokitō (時任三郎) as the photographer
- Keiko Saito (斉藤慶子)

== Background ==
The screenplay for the film, based on a novel by Agata Hikari, was written by director Yoshimitsu Morita. The film has been described as "one of the forerunners of Japanese new age movies in the 80s."

== Awards and nominations ==
10th Japan Academy Awards

- Nominated: Best Screenplay - Yoshimitsu Morita

8th Yokohama Film Festival

- Won: Best Film
- Won: Best Screenplay - Yoshimitsu Morita

29th Blue Ribbon Awards

- Won: Best Film
- Won: Best Actor - Kunie Tanaka
