= Kichitaro Negishi =

Japanese film director (born 1950)

- Born: August 24, 1950 (age 76); Tokyo, Japan
- Occupation: Film director
- Years active: 1978-

Kichitaro Negishi (根岸吉太郎, Negishi Kichitarō) is a Japanese film director. Although his films are admired by critics in Japan for their intelligence, Negishi has received little international recognition for his work. He has not been credited with a distinctive style but he has been called a subtle director who often elicits strong performances from his actors. He won the award for Best Director at the 3rd Yokohama Film Festival for Enrai and Crazy Fruit.

== Life and career ==
=== Early career - Nikkatsu ===
Negishi graduated from Waseda University in the Faculty of Theatre and Film Arts, and as with several other filmmakers of his generation, began his career directing Roman porno films for the Nikkatsu studio. He worked as assistant director on Toshiya Fujita's March 1978 Dangerous Liaisons (危険な関係, Kiken na kankei), based on the French novel Les Liaisons dangereuses, but his debut as a director for Nikkatsu was with the June 1978 erotic thriller From Orion's Testimony: Formula For Murder. The young Negishi's success with this film was a factor in Nikkatsu's decision to focus more on projects emphasizing story.

After a disappointing second feature High School Girl, Negishi returned to form with the box office hit Wet Weekend, which won the 9th Best Film award at the 1979 Yokohama Film Festival. Negishi's next film for Nikkatsu, Rape Ceremony was a tale of disaffected youth concerning a feud between former motorcycle gang members and the high school boys who once idolized them and now accuse them of selling out to the system. In the June 1980 "Never in the Morning" Negishi uses the office romance sex-farce plot to poke fun at contemporary morality and sexual double standards.

Negishi began 1981 with Female Teacher: Dirty After School, the third entry in the 8 episode "Female Teacher" series from Nikkatsu, all based loosely on Noboru Tanaka's 1973 hit film for Nikkatsu, Female Teacher: Private Life. Negishi's film is considered to be one of the best in the series and he was by this time one of Nikkatsu's top directors. His second film in 1981, Crazy Fruit, another story of alienated youth, was based on a 1956 Nikkatsu film Crazed Fruit, made before the studio's Roman porno period.

=== Into mainstream film ===
Negishi made his breakthrough into mainstream film with his October 1981 Enrai or Distant Thunder, produced by ATG, New Century Producers (NCP) and Nikkatsu. This film, with its detailed realism and complexity, along with his earlier Roman porno feature Crazy Fruit, won him the Best Director award at the 1982 Yokohama Film Festival. Negishi made one more Roman porno film for Nikkatsu, the June 1982 Cabaret Diary, a satirical look at hostesses and clients in a topless bar in Tokyo's Kabukichō district. Negishi left Nikkatsu after this film and was one of the founding members of Director's Company along with eight other young directors.

Soon afterwards he made the light comedy My Wedding (Oretchi no uedingu) followed by the July 1983 thriller Detective Story, starring Yūsaku Matsuda in a mixture of romance and mystery. Negishi received much favorable notice from his 1986 drama Uhohho tankentai (literally "Ooh! Exploration Party") written by fellow director Yoshimitsu Morita. The movie, produced by Director's Company and released by Toho, won the Best Film award at the 1987 Yokohama Film Festival as well as the Best Film prize at the Blue Ribbon Awards, and was cited as "one of the forerunners of Japanese new age movies in the 80s." Also favorably received was his next project, the 1987 Eien no 1/2, a modern, urban love story based on the novel by Shōgo Satō, which took the 4th Best Film award at the 1988 Yokohama Film Festival.

Despite his success in the late 1980s, Negishi worked only sparingly for the next 15 years: a 1992 film based on the manga series Kachō Kōsaku Shima, the short feature Chibusa about a man (Kaoru Kobayashi) caring for his leukemia-stricken wife, and Kizuna (1998), a thriller about a former yakuza with Kōji Yakusho and Ken Watanabe.

=== Later career ===
After several years away from filmmaking, Negishi returned in 2004 with Tōkō no ki (literally "Translucent Tree"), an adult romantic drama about a documentary filmmaker and the daughter of the subject of one of his films from 25 years earlier. A year later, What the Snow Brings, a low key drama about a prodigal son returning home to his family in Hokkaido, brought Negishi recognition in Japan with Best Director awards from the 2006 Hochi Film Awards, the 2007 Kinema Junpo Awards, the 2007 Mainichi Film Concours, the 2006 Nikkan Sports Film Awards, and the 2005 Tokyo International Film Festival, and international exposure at the 2007 Raindance Film Festival.

Negishi's 2009 melodrama, Villon's Wife, about an author and his long-suffering wife in post-war Japan, received ten nominations at the 2010 Japan Academy Awards including Best Film and Best Director. As in previous films, Negishi was able to evoke strong performances from his leads with Takako Matsu winning several Best Actress awards. The film also brought Negishi a Best Director award from the 2009 Montreal World Film Festival.

== Filmography ==
- From Orion's Testimony: Formula For Murder (オリオンの殺意より 情事の方程式, Orion No Satsui Yori: Jōji No Hōteishiki) (June 1978)
- High School Girl (女生徒, Joseito) (January 1979)
- Wet Weekend (濡れた週末, Nureta Shumatsu) (September 1979)
- Rape Ceremony (暴行儀式, Bōkō gishiki) (February 1980)
- "Never in the Morning" (朝はダメよ！, Asa wa dame yo!) (June 1980)
- Female Teacher: Dirty After School (女教師 汚れた放課後, Onna Kyoshi: Yogoreta hōkago) (January 1981)
- Crazy Fruit (狂った果実, Kurutta kajitsu) (April 1981)
- Enrai (遠雷) (October 1981)
- Cabaret Diary (キャバレー日記, Kyabarē nikki) (June 1982)
- My wedding (俺っちのウエディング, Oretchi no uedingu) (April 1983)
- Detective Story (探偵物語, Tantei Monogatari) (July 1983)
- Flakes of Snow (ひとひらの雪, Hitohira no yuki) (September 1985)
- House of Wedlock (ウホッホ探険隊, Uhohho tankentai) (October 1986)
- Eien no 1/2 (永遠の1/２) (November 1987)
- Kachō Kōsaku Shima (課長 島耕作) (October 1992)
- Chibusa (乳房) (October 1993)
- Kizuna (絆 －きずな－) (June 1998)
- Tōkō no ki (透光の樹) (October 2004)
- What the Snow Brings (雪に願うこと, Yuki ni negau koto) (October 2005)
- Dog in a Sidecar (サイドカーに犬, Saidokā ni inu) (June 2007)
- Villon's Wife (2009)
- Yasuko, Songs of Days Past (2025) It competed in the Big Screen Competition section of the 54th International Film Festival Rotterdam to be screened in February 2025.
