= Sorekara =

Novel by Natsume Sōseki

And Then
- Author: Natsume Sōseki
- Original title: Sorekara
- Translator: Norma Moore Field
- Language: Japanese
- Publisher: The Asahi Shimbun (newspaper)
- Publication date: 1909
- Publication place: Japan
- English publication date: 1978
- Media type: Print
- Preceded by: Sanshirō
- Followed by: The Gate

And Then (Japanese: それから, Hepburn: Sorekara) is a 1909 Japanese novel by Natsume Sōseki. It is the second part of a trilogy, preceded by Sanshirō (1908) and followed by The Gate (1910).

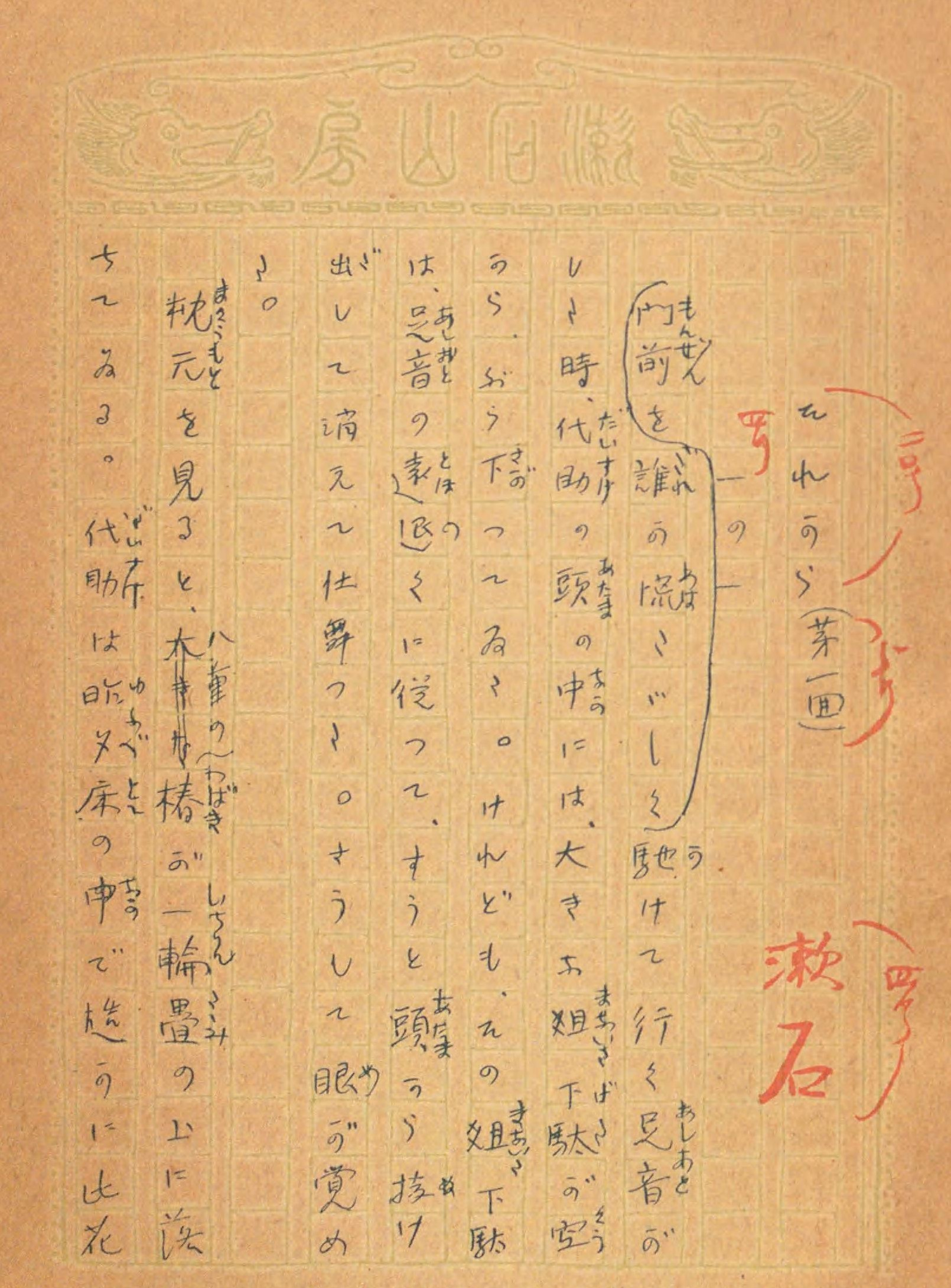
Part of the manuscripts of "And Then"

== Plot ==
The novel starts with Daisuke, the protagonist, waking up and staring at the ceiling, his hand feeling for his heartbeat. He is the son of a wealthy family and has graduated from a prestigious university, but despite graduating, he is now thirty years old and unemployed, depending on his father's wealth.

One day, he meets his former university friends, Hiraoka and Terao. Hiraoka had a career in the Japanese civil service, but he fought with his boss and was fired for mismanaging finance. Terao intended to become a world-famous novelist but ended up in a part-time job translating works and writing short articles for low wages. These two friends represent a world that Daisuke feels completely detached from, and he questions their reasons for working.

Daisuke does not have much attachment to traditional Japanese society since his education has given him the knowledge that the world is too vast to be confined to the boundaries delineated by tradition. Furthermore, he cannot form any connection to modern society, which views education merely as the prelude to success in a bureaucratic order. Because of Daisuke's detachment from everything, his family decides to continue their financial support for him only on the condition that he marries a woman they have chosen for him. However, Daisuke decides not to take any more support from his family and not to get married.

It is later discovered that Daisuke has had romantic feelings for Hiraoka's wife, Michiyo since he met her back in his university years. Daisuke was also the one who introduced Michiyo to Hiraoka, who then decided to ask for her hand. Out of ego and his wish to avoid turning Hiraoka into a rival, Daisuke did not disclose his affection for Michiyo but instead played matchmaker for Hiraoka and Michiyo to get married, an act that eventually led to his detachment from the mundane world of responsibilities and employment as a coping mechanism against the self-inflicted loss of love to a man he covertly deemed inferior.

Against the backdrop of a now defeatist Hiraoka, multiple encounters between Daisuke and Michiyo imply that the feelings are mutual. Nearing the end of the book, Michiyo expresses her disappointment towards Daisuke giving her up to Hiraoka in the past. It is also revealed that she had a miscarriage of Hiraoka's child.

Emboldened by the confirmation of reciprocity, Daisuke plans to elope with Michiyo, to which she agrees. As the book concludes, Daisuke walks down the street in search of a job while the color red fills up his vision, suggesting a sense of dread and spiral now that he is going to betray his friendship with Hiraoka and sever the financial ties to his family for good.

== Publication history ==
The publication of And Then was announced in the newspaper Asahi Shimbun on 22 June 1909. It then appeared in the Asahi Shimbun in serialised form between 27 June and 14 October the same year. The following year, it was published in book form by the Shunyodo Publishing Company.

== English translation ==
And Then, an English translation of Sorekara by Norma Moore Field, was first published in 1978.

== Adaptations ==
Natsume's novel has been adapted into a film by Yoshimitsu Morita in 1985 and into a stage play by Kana Yamada in 2017.
