= Enrai =

1981 film by Kichitaro Negishi

- Film poster
- Directed by: Kichitaro Negishi
- Written by: Haruhiko Arai
- Based on: Enrai by Wahei Tatematsu
- Starring: Toshiyuki Nagashima; Johnny Ohkura; Eri Ishida
- Cinematography: Shohei Ando (安藤庄平)
- Edited by: Akira Suzuki
- Music by: Takayuki Inoue
- Production companies: ATG; New Century Producers (NCP); Nikkatsu
- Distributed by: ATG
- Release date: October 24, 1981 (Japan)
- Running time: 135 minutes
- Country: Japan
- Language: Japanese

Enrai (Japanese: 遠雷) or Distant Thunder is a 1981 Japanese film adaptation of Wahei Tatematsu's novel of the same name, directed by Kichitaro Negishi.

== Synopsis ==
Enrai is a low-key study of a farmer, Mitsuo Wada, in 1980s Japan when modernization and urbanization were threatening rural areas. After his father leaves his wife to run off with his mistress, Mitsuo struggles to preserve his livelihood with the help of his mother, grandmother, and his arranged marriage bride, Ayako.

== Cast ==
- Toshiyuki Nagashima as Mitsuo Wada
- Johnny Ohkura (ジョニー大倉) as Hirotsugu Nakamori
- Eri Ishida as Ayako Hanamori
- Rie Yokoyama (横山リエ) as Kaede
- Casey Takamine (ケーシー高峰) as Mitsuo's father
- Reiko Nanao (七尾伶子) as Mitsuo's mother
- Sen Hara (原泉) as Mitsuo's grandmother
- Yumiko Fujita as Chii
- Keizō Kanie as Kaede's husband

== Background ==
Enrai is based on the 1980 novel of the same name by Wahei Tatematsu. The film, financed by ATG, Nikkatsu, and the smaller Nikkatsu-related company New Century Producers, marked director Negishi's breakthrough into mainstream film after several Roman porno features for Nikkatsu. Enrai was released in Japan as a VHS tape by Pioneer LDC (パイオニアLDC) in July 1998 and subsequently as a DVD in February 2008 by Geneon Entertainment (ジェネオン エンタテインメント).

== Awards and nominations ==
3rd Yokohama Film Festival

- Won: Best Director - Kichitaro Negishi
- Won: Best Screenplay - Haruhiko Arai
- Won: Best Cinematography - Shohei Ando
- Won: Best Actor - Toshiyuki Nagashima

6th Hochi Film Awards

- Won: Best Film
- Won: Best Actor - Toshiyuki Nagashima
- Won: New Face Award - Eri Ishida
