= Sorekara (film) =

- DVD cover
- Directed by: Yoshimitsu Morita
- Screenplay by: Tomomi Tsutsui
- Based on: Sorekara by Natsume Sōseki
- Produced by: Mitsuru Kurosawa
- Starring: Yūsaku Matsuda; Miwako Okamura; Kaoru Kobayashi; Morio Kazama; Chishū Ryū
- Cinematography: Yonezo Maeda
- Edited by: Akira Suzuki
- Music by: Shigeru Umebayashi
- Production company: Toei Company
- Distributed by: Toei Company
- Release date: November 9, 1985 (Japan)
- Running time: 130 minutes
- Country: Japan
- Language: Japanese

Sorekara (それから, lit. "And Then") is a 1985 Japanese drama film directed by Yoshimitsu Morita, based on the novel of the same name by Natsume Sōseki. The film stars Yūsaku Matsuda in the lead role, alongside Miwako Okamura, Kaoru Kobayashi, Morio Kazama and Chishū Ryū. Toei Company released the film on November 9, 1985, in Japan.

== Cast ==
Actor	Role
Yūsaku Matsuda	Daisuke Nagai
Miwako Okamura	Michiyo Hiraoka
Kaoru Kobayashi	Tsunejiro Hiraoka
Morio Kazama	Suganuma
Chishū Ryū	Toku Nagai
Katsuo Nakamura	Seigo Nagai
Mitsuko Kusabue	Umeko Nagai
Yumi Morio	Nui Nagai
Issey Ogata	Terao
Maiko Kawakami	Kozome
Kenji Haga	Kadono
Jun Izumi	Joro

== Awards and nominations ==
7th Yokohama Film Festival

- Won: Best Music Score - Shigeru Umebayashi
- 6th Best Film
