= Picnic (1996 film) =

- DVD cover
- Directed by: Shunji Iwai
- Written by: Shunji Iwai
- Produced by: Juichi Horuhuchi; Aiko Najo; Susumu Tanaka
- Starring: Chara; Tadanobu Asano; Koichi Hashizume
- Cinematography: Noboru Shinoda
- Edited by: Tokisho Kojima
- Music by: Remedios
- Production companies: Fuji Television; Pony Canyon; Robot Co., Ltd.
- Distributed by: Ace Pictures; Nippon Herald Films
- Release date: June 15, 1996 (Japan)
- Running time: 72 minutes
- Country: Japan
- Language: Japanese

Picnic (Hepburn: Pikunikku), also stylized as PiCNiC, is a 1996 Japanese film directed by Shunji Iwai. It was released in 1996, with shooting taking place in 1994. The film follows three patients of a mental asylum who misinterpret a passage from the Bible as a sign that the end of the world is imminent, and escape from the walls of the facility to find a place to picnic and watch the event.

The film stars Chara in the first of her two roles in Shunji Iwai's filmography, alongside Tadanobu Asano and Koichi Hashizume.

== Plot ==
After her parents drop her off at a mental asylum for young teenagers, a girl named Coco is swarmed by the eerily enthusiastic staff. Inside her assigned room, a nurse treats her roughly and confiscates her belongings and adornments, except for her crow feather scarf, which Coco holds onto tightly. She meets other patients, including Tsumuji and his friend Satoru, and later befriends them during an art therapy session. While in his cell, Tsumuji vividly hallucinates his grade school teacher molesting him.

One morning, after stealing black paint from the art supply storeroom, Coco meets Satoru and Tsumuji as they scale the asylum walls and stare out onto the road beyond. They explain that they are exploring, and that they won't get in trouble if they don't go beyond the wall. Coco follows them along the wall of the block, observing the sights outside. She then runs beyond the block on her own and stops near a church to listen to a children's hymn recital; Tsumuji follows behind her. A priest comes out of the church and has a conversation with them about the nature of God. Tsumuji tells the priest that he is unconvinced of God's existence due to his prayers for the end of the world going unanswered, and Coco defines her birth as the beginning of the world and her death as the end of the world, saying that her parents are God. The priest stops their argument and hands them a Bible, encouraging them to read it.

Tsumuji peruses the Bible and references to Coco the Book of Genesis, stating that God created the world. Upon returning to the asylum, the two are restrained by the asylum staff and taken to a punishment ward, where they lie strapped to beds. At night, a staff nurse rapes Tsumuji, who hallucinates his grade school teacher taunting and urinating on him.

The group later become increasingly absorbed in the Bible, especially a passage describing the end of the world. They interpret the book's publishing date as the event's reference point. Excited by the impending apocalypse, the trio head out to look for a place to picnic while they watch the event unfold.

This time, they go beyond the church and into the main city, attracting stares. On their walk, they steal a gun from a pursuing police officer and mock a billboard advertisement for a sports drink. In a residential area, Satoru reaches for a thrown-out trash bag and opens it looking for food, but is horrified to find a severed hand, and runs away from the other two. Falling off the wall near a grassy field and hitting his head on a rock, he stumbles dazedly while insisting out loud that he has to climb the wall again, before passing out from blood loss.

Coco and Tsumuji continue their walk, but a sudden burst of rain triggers Tsumuji's trauma. He confesses to Coco that after years of being molested, he snapped and stabbed his teacher to death on a rainy day. Comforting him, Coco reveals that she, too, had killed a person - her identical twin Kiki - in a game of who-is-fake. They share a brief kiss, then conclude their walk at an offshore beacon as the sun sets.

They open their picnic basket, which is empty, and mime the eating of food, before Tsumuji suggests that shooting the sun with the police officer's gun may trigger the event. Tsumuji fires three shots into the sun, but nothing happens. Coco teases him for being a lousy shot, then picks up the gun and shoots herself in the head, thus ending her world. The feathers from her scarf burst into the air as Tsumuji grasps her body, clicking the now empty gun into the sky and cursing.

== Cast ==
- Chara as Coco, who likes ravens and wears black feathers. She believes that the world started when she was born and will end when she dies.
- Tadanobu Asano as Tsumuji, who killed a teacher who tormented him, has hallucinations of this teacher, and wants the world to end soon.
- Koichi Hashizume as Satoru, friend of Tsumuji. He has a crush on Coco.
- Fujiko Yamamoto as Nurse.
- Kazue Itoh as Doctor.
- Keiichi Suzuki as Pastor.

== Awards and nominations ==
46th Berlin International Film Festival

- Won: International Forum of New Cinema: Berliner Zeitung Readers' Jury Prize

18th Yokohama Film Festival

- Won: Best Actor (Tadanobu Asano, also won for Focus, Helpless and Acri; award shared with Koji Yakusho)
- Won: Best New Talent (Chara, also won for Swallowtail Butterfly; award shared with Masanobu Ando and Tamiyo Kusakari)
