= Ninagawa =

Ninagawa (written: 蜷川) is a Japanese surname. Notable people with the surname include:

- Mika Ninagawa (蜷川 実花, born 1975), Japanese photographer and film director
- Yuki Ninagawa (蜷川 有紀, born 1960), Japanese actress
- Yukio Ninagawa (蜷川 幸雄, 1935–2016), Japanese theatre director
