= A Sign Days =

- Film poster
- Kanji: Aサインデイズ
- Directed by: Yōichi Sai
- Written by: Hiroshi Saitō; Yōichi Sai
- Produced by: Hiroshi Yamamoto; Masayuki Sato
- Starring: Anna Nakagawa; Ryō Ishibashi; Leona Hirota
- Cinematography: Takeshi Hamada
- Edited by: Isao Tomita
- Distributed by: Daiei Film
- Release date: June 9, 1989 (Japan)
- Running time: 111 minutes
- Country: Japan
- Language: Japanese

A Sign Days (Japanese: Aサインデイズ), also known as Via Okinawa, is a 1989 Japanese film directed by Yōichi Sai.

== Awards ==
11th Yokohama Film Festival

- Won: Best Actor - Ryō Ishibashi
- Won: Best Actress - Anna Nakagawa
- Won: Best Screenplay - Hiroshi Saitō, Yōichi Sai
- 3rd Best Film
