= A Homansu =

1986 film by Yusaku Matsuda

- Theatrical release poster
- Directed by: Yūsaku Matsuda
- Screenplay by: Shōichi Maruyama; Yūsaku Matsuda
- Story by: Garon Tsuchiya
- Produced by: Katsuhiko Aoki; Mitsuru Kurosawa
- Starring: Yūsaku Matsuda; Ryo Ishibashi; Yoko Aki
- Cinematography: Seizō Sengen
- Edited by: Isao Tomita
- Music by: Toshihiro Nara
- Production company: Kitty Films
- Distributed by: Toei Company
- Release date: October 10, 1986 (Japan)
- Running time: 99 minutes
- Country: Japan
- Language: Japanese

A Homansu (Japanese: ア・ホーマンス) is a 1986 Japanese film. It stars Yūsaku Matsuda, who also directed it after the planned director Yonosuke Koike dropped out due to differences with Matsuda. It is based on a manga by Marley Caribu. The title of the film is a combination of the two words aho, meaning "fool", and "performance".

== Plot ==
A homeless man suffering from memory loss is unbeatable in a fight. He becomes involved with the Yakuza.

== Cast ==
- Yūsaku Matsuda as Kaze
- Ryo Ishibashi as Michio Yamazaki
- Yoko Aki as Kanako
- Susumu Terajima
