= Spacewarp (toy) =

Marble run toy by Bandai

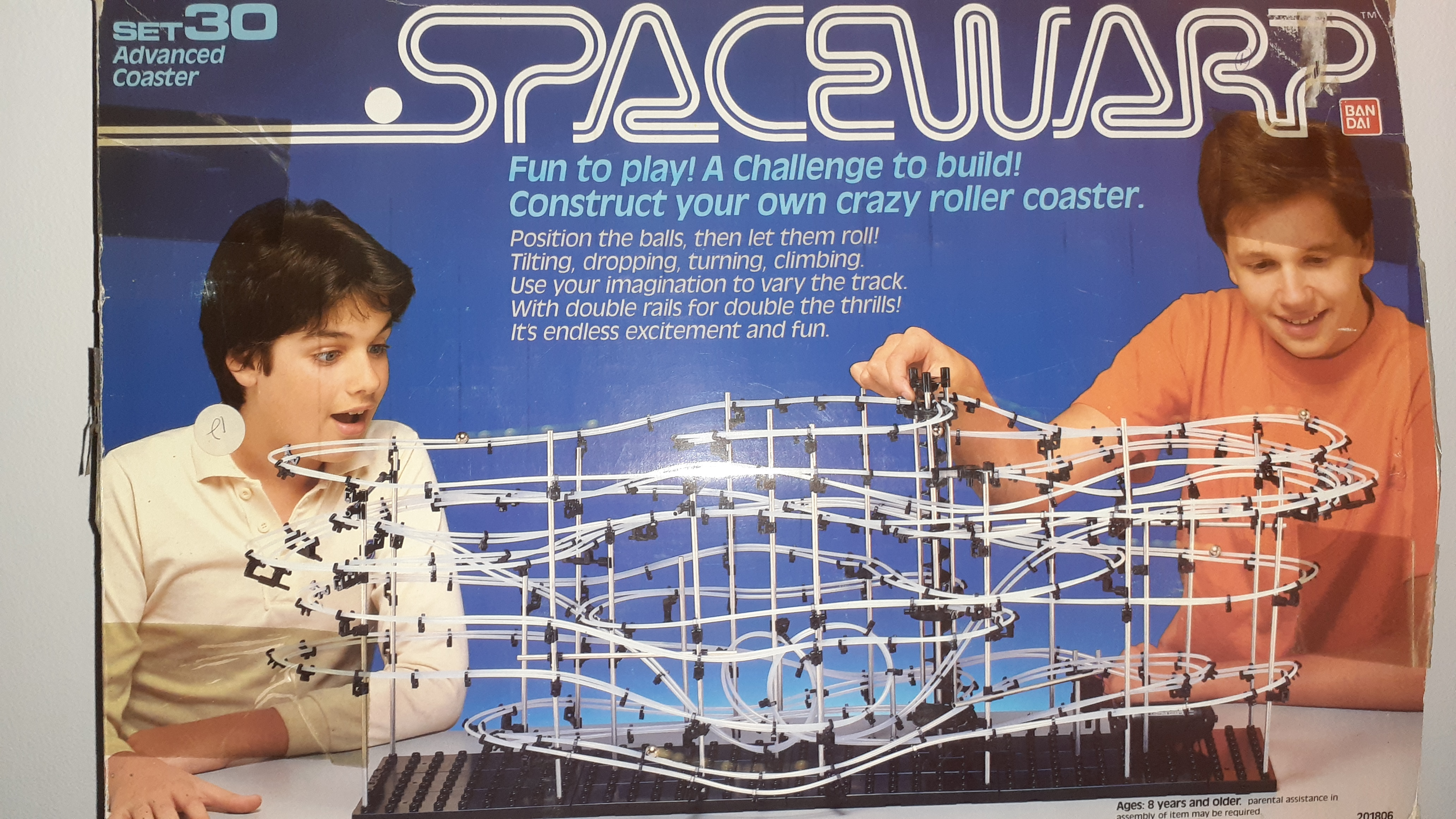

Spacewarp is a line of build-it-yourself, marble-run toy "roller coasters" first made in the 1980s by Bandai. Users cut lengths of track to the correct size from a single roll of thick plastic tubing, forming curves and loops held in place by plastic track rail holders which attach to metal rods held vertical in a black plastic base. Steel balls roll around the track and on to a battery-powered screw conveyor that takes them to the top to start all over again.

Production of Spacewarp toys ended around 1988. Replacement parts were sold until 1995.

A redesigned Spacewarp toy was re-introduced to the Japanese market in 2005 by Tanomi. Improvements included redesigned parts which were less prone to breakage.

== History ==
The first Spacewarp sets became available in Japan in 1983 and were sold by Bandai. That year, filmmakers were working on a movie called The Family Game which features a plot line about a boy who is fascinated with roller coasters. The filmmakers noticed the Spacewarp toy and decided to incorporate it into the movie in a few scenes. The movie The Family Game was released in Japan in November, 1983 to favorable reviews. Due to the popularity of the movie, Spacewarp sales increased so much that between 1983 and 1984, approximately one million sets were sold.

Due to the product's popularity, Spacewarp applied for and received the Spacewarp trademark in the United States of America in 1986, and started selling a subset of its marble roller coasters there.

== Sets ==
1986-1990s North American Imports:

Set	Description	Rail (mm)	Base Plates	Special Feature(s)
10	Beginning Coaster	14,000	3	Elevator, switch unit, curve units
20	Intermediate Coaster	22,000	11	Elevator, switch unit
30	Advanced Coaster	40,000	13	Elevator, switch unit
40	Expert Coaster	43,000	20	Elevator
Black Wolf	Ages 8 and up	20,000	8	Elevator, switch unit, staircase, chimes, black plastic tubing

1983-1995 Japanese Market:

Set	Release year	Rail (mm)	Base Plates	Special Feature(s)
10			9	Elevator
15		17,000	8	Elevator, switch unit
20			10?	Elevator, switch unit
30			20?	Elevator, switch unit
40		43,000	20	
Set I	1983	11,000	6	Toothed lift
Set II		22,000	12	Elevator
Set L			7	Elevator, switch unit, electric lights
Action 1	1984		6	Elevator, switch unit, windmill, see saw, escalator, pendulum, mystery box, bell set
Action 2	1984		8	Elevator, switch unit, windmill, see saw, escalator, pendulum, mystery box, bell set (x2), staircase
Blue Wings	1985	28,000	11	Elevator, switch unit, blue plastic tubing
Space Tree			3	Elevator, electric lights, blue supports
Set W		19,260+spare	13	Elevator, switch unit
FLATSTAGE	1985		3	Elevator, curve units
Black Wolf	1985		8	Elevator, switch unit, staircase, curve units, chimes, escalator

2004–2008 Japanese Market:

Set	Release year	Rail (mm)	Base Plates	Complexity	Accessories
3500	2004	9,000	2	2 out of 5	Elevator, see saw drop
5000	2004	16,000	6	3 out of 5	Elevator, rail splitter. Special edition available with black plastic tubing.
10000	2005	32,000	12	5 out of 5	Elevator, rail splitter, see saw drop, pendulum with marble trap
Start	2006	5,000	3	1 out of 5	Elevator, rail splitter, prefab loop, prefab corners
Desktop	2007	N/A	N/A	N/A	Preformed plastic tracks instead of plastic tubing for rails
Spacewarp X: The Family Game	2008		6	N/A	Elevator. Limited, numbered edition available.

== Accessories ==
Additional accessories include lighting kits, a staircase, bell ringer, escalator and more.

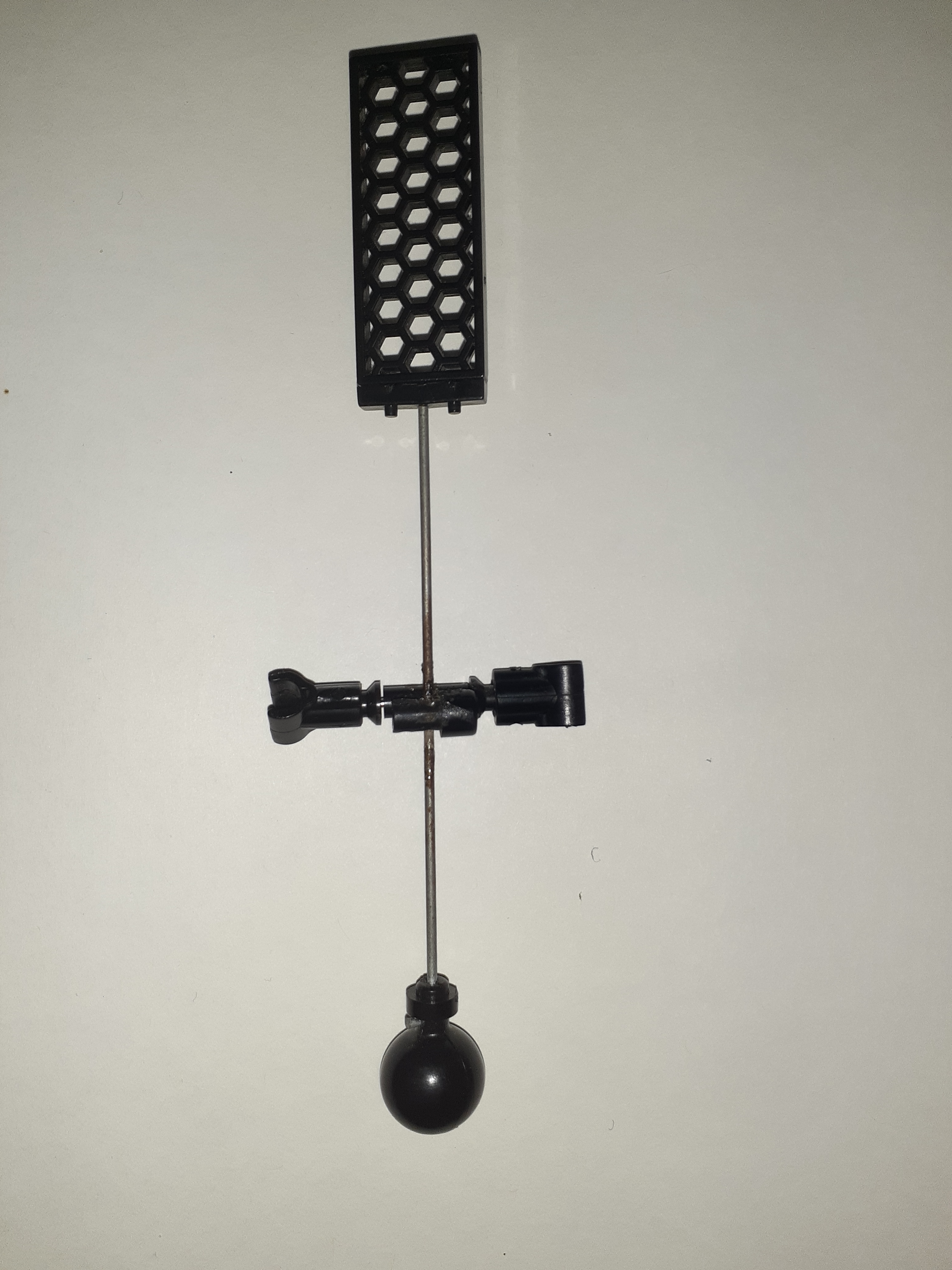
The mail-order pendulum accessory for Spacewarp

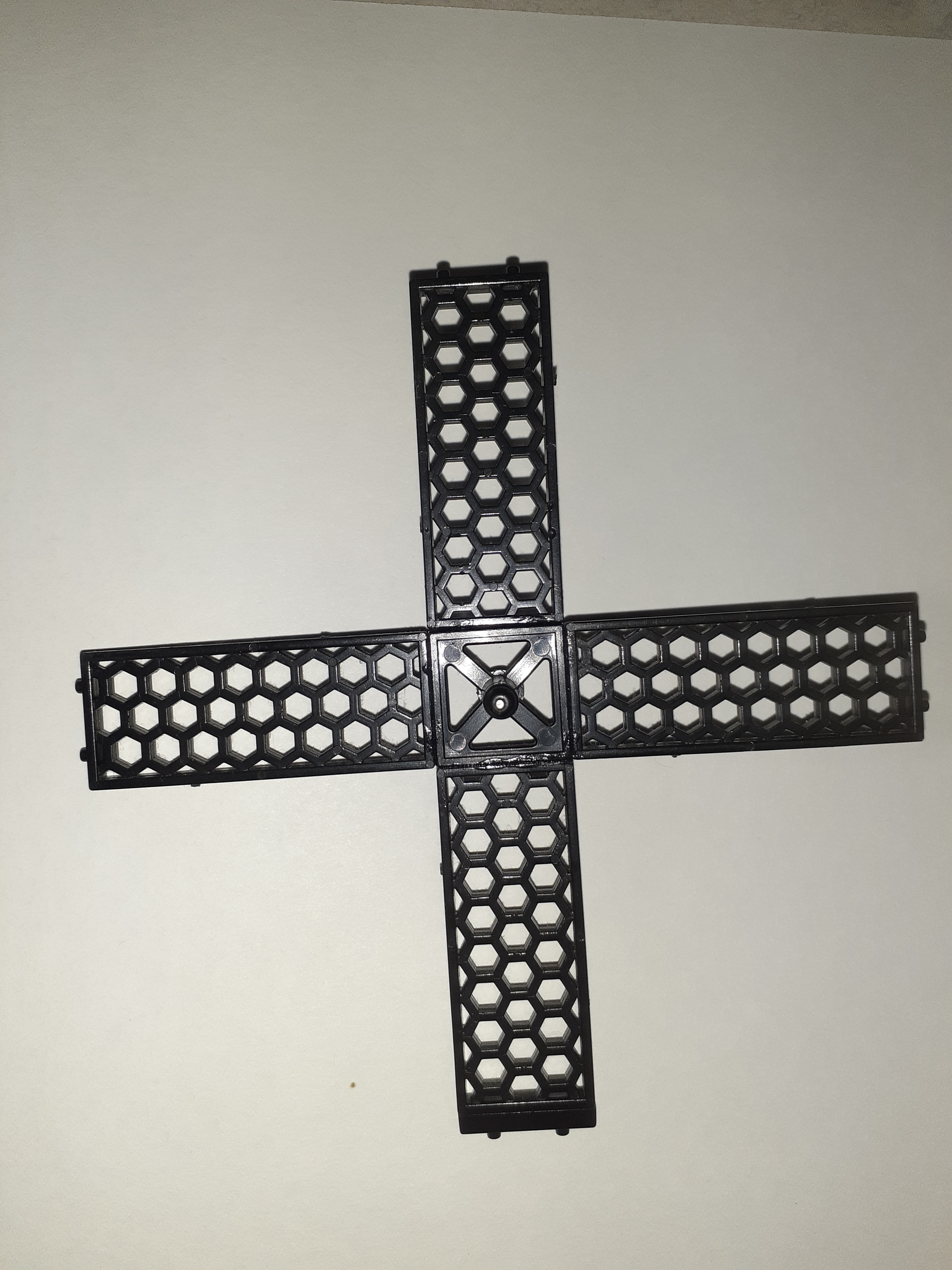
The mail-order windmill accessory for Spacewarp

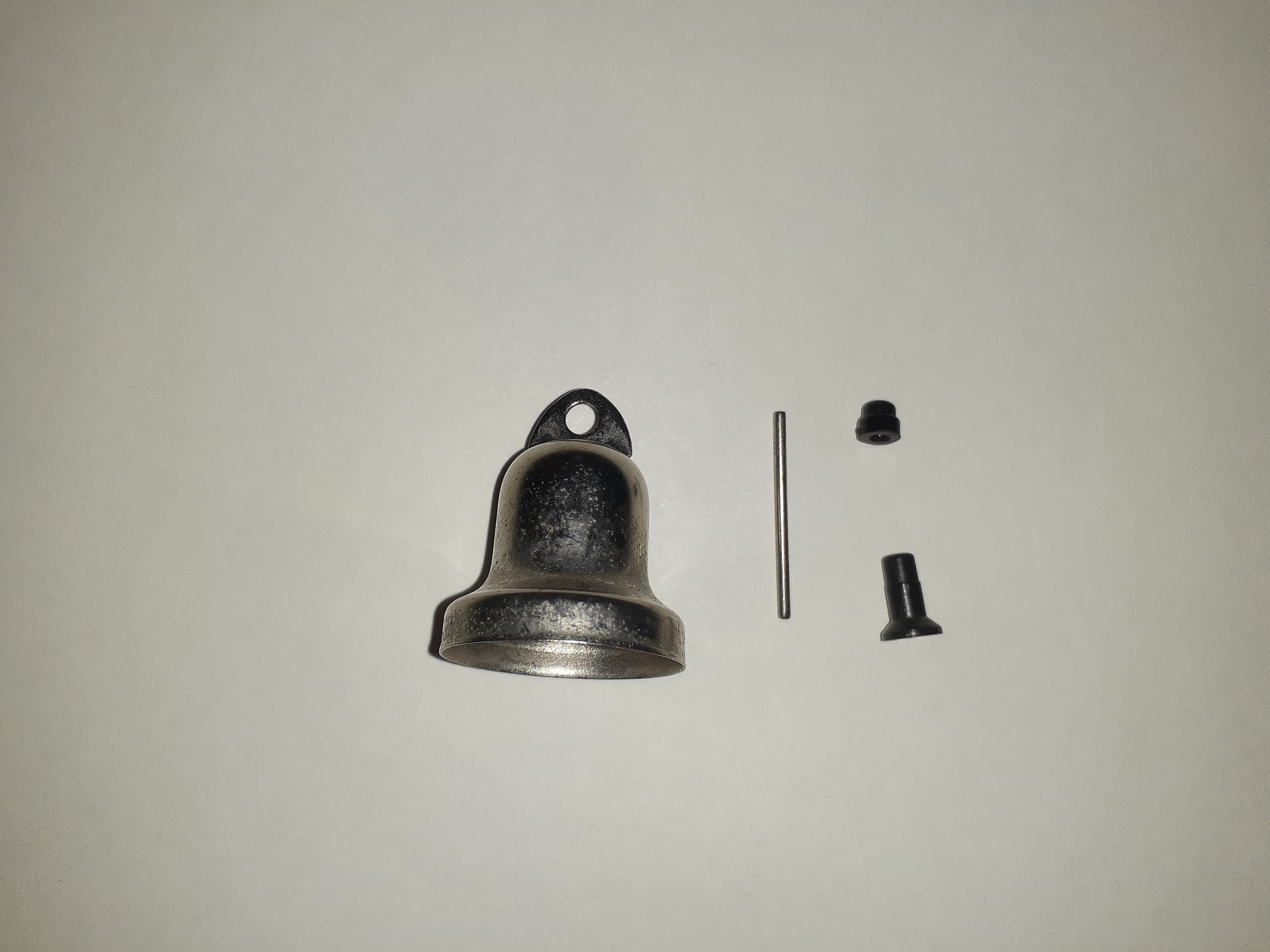
The mail-order bell set accessory for Spacewarp

== Knock-Offs ==
As with many popular toys, nearly identical counterfeit editions have emerged under the Chinese "Spacerail" brand. However, Spacerail acquired the Spacewarp trademark, and is continuing their tradition of running marble roller coasters.

Spacerail sets:

Set Number	Set Name	Base Plates	Complexity	Notes	Accessories
231-1	SpaceRail 5,000mm Rail Level 1.1	3	1 of 9	Equivalent to "Spacewarp Start"	Elevator, rail splitter, prefab loop, prefab corners
231-2	SpaceRail 10,000mm Rail Level 2.1	2	2 of 9	Equivalent to "Spacewarp 3500"	Elevator, see saw drop
231-3	SpaceRail 16,000mm Rail Level 3.1	6	3 of 9	Equivalent to "Spacewarp 5000"	Elevator, rail splitter
231-4	SpaceRail 26,000mm Rail Level 4.1	9	4 of 9		Elevator, rail splitter, see saw drop, marble trap
231-5	SpaceRail 32,000mm Rail Level 5.1	12	5 of 9	Equivalent to "Spacewarp 10000"	Elevator, rail splitter, see saw drop, pendulum with marble trap
231-6	SpaceRail 60,000mm Rail Level 6.1	16	6 of 9		Elevator, rail splitter (x2), see saw drop
231-7	SpaceRail 32,000mm Rail Level 7.1	15 (2 lifted)	7 of 9		Elevators (x3), lifted base plates (x2)
231-8	SpaceRail 40,000mm Rail Level 8.1	12	8 of 9		Triple-height elevator, rail splitter (x2)
231-9	SpaceRail 70,000mm Rail Level 9.1	14 (1 lifted)	9 of 9		Elevators (x3, one "descent"), rail splitters (x3), pendulum, lifted base plate
232-1	SpaceRail 8,600mm Rail	7	N/A	"Research and Development" series	Windmill lift, staircase lift, rail splitter
232-2	SpaceRail 5,600mm Rail	6	N/A	"Research and Development" series	Double-windmill lift, rail splitter, see saw drop
232-3	SpaceRail 8,100mm Rail	6	N/A	"Research and Development" series	"Crane-style" elevator, rail splitter
233-1	SpaceRail Glow in the Dark 6,500mm Rail Level 1.2	2	N/A	A version with white rails exists. It is possible that this is an update to 231-1 without the special preformed pieces	Elevator
233-2	SpaceRail Glow in the Dark 5,500mm Rail Level 2.2	2	N/A		Elevator, see saw drop
233-3	SpaceRail Glow in the Dark 13,500mm Rail Level 3.2	3	N/A		Elevator, see saw drop
233-4	SpaceRail Glow in the Dark 22,000mm Rail Level 4.2	6	N/A		Elevator, rail splitter
233-5	SpaceRail Glow in the Dark 30,000mm Rail Level 5.2	10	N/A		Elevator, rail splitter, see saw drop, marble trap

== See also ==
- Rolling Ball Sculpture
