= Yoichi Sai =

South Korean film director (1949–2022)

Yōichi Sai
- Born: Choi Yang-il; 6 July 1949; Nagano Prefecture, Japan
- Died: 27 November 2022 (aged 73); Tokyo, Japan
- Occupation: Film director

Korean name
- Hangul: 최양일
- Hanja: 崔洋一
- RR: Choe Yangil
- MR: Ch'oe Yangil

Yōichi Sai (崔 洋一, Sai Yōichi; 6 July 1949 – 27 November 2022) was a Korean film director who worked in Japan. He was the president of the Directors Guild of Japan.

== Life and career ==
Sai was born on 6 July 1949 in Nagano Prefecture, Japan. His mother was Japanese and his father was Zainichi Korean.

Sai won the Best Screenplay award at the 11th Yokohama Film Festival for A Sign Days.

In 1999, he shot The Pig's Retribution, a film set in the lavish natural scenery of Okinawa, inspired by the 1996 Akutagawa Prize-winning eponymous novel by Eiki Matayoshi. The film won the Don Quixote prize at the Locarno International Film Festival in 1999.

Sai directed Blood and Bones, a film starring Takeshi Kitano. He has also directed films such as Marks, Doing Time, Quill, Soo and Kamui Gaiden.

As an actor, Sai appeared in Nagisa Oshima's 1999 film Taboo and Masahiko Nagasawa's 2003 film The Thirteen Steps.

Sai's 2004 film Blood and Bones won four Japanese Academy Awards, including two for Sai himself, for Best Director and Best Screenplay. He had previously received two nominations in the same categories for All Under the Moon.

Sai died of bladder cancer at his home in Tokyo, on 27 November 2022, at the age of 73.

== Filmography ==
=== As director ===
==== Film ====
- Mosquito on the 10th Floor (1983)
- Sex Crime (1983)
- Someone Will Be Killed (1984)
- Let Him Rest in Peace (1985)
- Kuroi Doresu no Onna (1987)
- Hana no Asuka-gumi! (1988)
- A Sign Days (1989)
- Burning Dog (1991)
- All Under the Moon (1993)
- Marks (1995)
- Heisei Musekinin Ikka: Tokyo Deluxe (1995)
- Dog Race (1998)
- The Pig's Retribution (1999)
- Doing Time (2002)
- Blood and Bones (2004)
- Quill (2004)
- Soo (2007)
- Kamui Gaiden (2009)

==== TV ====
- Pro Hunter (1981) (ep.15, 16 and 25)

=== As actor ===
- Taboo (1999)
- The Thirteen Steps (2003)
