= 22nd Yokohama Film Festival =

2001 film festival in Yokohama, Japan

- Location: Kannai Hall, Yokohama, Kanagawa, Japan
- Founded: 1980
- Festival date: 4 February 2001

The 22nd Yokohama Film Festival (第22回ヨコハマ映画祭) was held on 4 February 2001 in Kannai Hall, Yokohama, Kanagawa, Japan.

== Awards ==
- Best Film: Face
- Best Actor: Tadanobu Asano – Gojoe, Jirai o Fundara Sayōnara
- Best Actress: Naomi Fujiyama – Face
- Best Supporting Actor:
  - Teruyuki Kagawa – Boys' Choir, Pickpocket
  - Jun Murakami – Nabbie's Love, I Am an S&M Writer, New Battles Without Honor and Humanity
- Best Supporting Actress: Naomi Nishida – Nabbie's Love
- Best Director: Junji Sakamoto – Face
- Best New Director: Akira Ogata – Boys' Choir
- Best Screenplay: Junji Sakamoto and Isamu Uno – Face
- Best Cinematography: Masami Inomoto – Boys' Choir
- Best New Talent:
  - Sora Tōma – Boys' Choir
  - Ryuhei Matsuda – Taboo
  - Kirina Mano – Pickpocket, Bullet Ballet
- Special Jury Prize: Yukiko Shii – Face
- Special Prize: Masaru Konuma – Nagisa – For directing film as well as for his work.

== Best 10 ==
1. Face
2. Nabbie's Love
3. First Love
4. Gohatto
5. Boys' Choir
6. The City of Lost Souls
7. Pickpocket
8. Charisma
9. Nagisa
10. A Class to Remember IV

runner-up: After the Rain
