= Soo (film) =

- Film poster
- Hangul: 수
- RR: Su
- MR: Su
- Directed by: Yoichi Sai
- Written by: Lee Seung-hwan; Lee Joon-il; Yoichi Sai
- Produced by: Shin Beom-su; Hwang In-tae
- Starring: Ji Jin-hee; Kang Sung-yeon; Oh Man-seok; Moon Sung-keun
- Cinematography: Kim Seong-bok
- Edited by: Lee Eun-su
- Music by: Lee Byung-woo
- Distributed by: Cinema Service
- Release date: March 22, 2007
- Running time: 122 minutes
- Country: South Korea
- Language: Korean
- Box office: US$1,275,162

Soo (Korean: 수) is a 2007 South Korean neo-noir action thriller film directed by Yoichi Sai (also known as Choi Yang-il).

== Plot ==
Tae-soo tries to steal from a gang. The gang catches Tae-soo's brother Tae-jin instead. The incident causes the brothers to separate. Tae-soo becomes a mob fixer and an assassin. Tae-jin becomes a police detective. When a call brings the brothers together, they get ready for brotherly bonding, but Tae-jin is killed. Tae-soo decides to get revenge on his brother's killer.

== Cast ==
- Ji Jin-hee as Tae-soo
  - Park Chan Yang as young Tae-soo
- Kang Sung-yeon as Kang Mi-na
- Moon Sung-keun Gu Yang-won
- Lee Ki-young as Nam Dal-gu
- Jo Kyung-hwan as Song-in ("Boss")
- Oh Man-seok as Jeom Park-yi
- Choi Deok-moon as Lee Won-jae
- Yang Young-jo as Yoo Seon-il
- Kim Jun-bae as Kim Jin-man
- Choi Jung-woo as Detective squad chief of police department team 2
- Park Hyuk-kwon as Detective Jang
- Jo Seok-hyeon as Detective Park
- Lee Jae-gu as Detective Choi

== Theatrical release ==
Soo was released in South Korea on March 22, 2007, and was ranked fifth at the domestic box office on its opening weekend, grossing US$795,086. As of April 15, 2007, the film had a gross revenue of US$1,275,162.

== Critical reception ==
Kevin Ma of Love HK Film reviewed the film saying, "Soo's concept is somewhat successful on paper because it doesn't take the easy way to revenge. In execution, Soo is wildly uneven, moving between slow exposition scenes of plot development and raw, brutal fight scenes dominated by chaos. However, it remains a compelling and violent action film thanks to Sai's fluid camerawork during the action scenes and the performances of his actors. Special kudos go to star Ji Jin-Hee, who sheds his romantic leading man reputation to become a believable killer who can stab and punch his way out of a fight. Sai also sheds the expectations put on him after Blood and Bones by delivering an arthouse spin on a straightforward revenge film. Still, the film's ultimate effectiveness remains highly debatable."

Derek Elley of Variety reviewed the film saying, "A onetime killer hits the road to self-redemption by tracking down his brother's killer in "Soo," a coolly told, often brutal yarn that remains strangely involving despite its flaws. High-concept idea—a twin brother takes on his dead cop brother's identity to solve a crime he's also been hunted for by the cops—has strong remake potential. Pic itself, which bombed on South Korean release in March, is more ancillary or film week fare."

Lee Hyo-won of The Korea Times reviewed the film saying, "Soo is a memorable film. In Korean, "soo" means water, the very essence of life. Throughout the film Soo seeks to free his brother from "han" or spiteful grudge, as well as his own soul from staggering guilt. Even the Bad Guy wishes to spare his father the fires of hell. Choi's lasting imagery of water washing away blood suggests the pervasive human instinct to survive and the desire to purge oneself of one's impurities."
