= Woman Who Exposes Herself =

- Directed by: Masaru Konuma
- Produced by: Yoshio Murai
- Starring: Maiko Kazama; Izumi Shima
- Cinematography: Nobumasa Mizunoo
- Edited by: Akimasa Kawashima
- Music by: Hachiro Kai
- Production company: Nikkatsu
- Release date: January 9, 1981
- Running time: 68 minutes
- Country: Japan
- Language: Japanese

Woman Who Exposes Herself (見せたがる女, Misetagaru onna) is a 1981 Japanese film directed by Masaru Konuma and starring Maiko Kazama. It is the third film in the four part "The Woman Who ..." series which Nikkatsu produced in 1981–1982 as part of their Roman porno series to showcase the talents of Maiko Kazama as a successor to Naomi Tani who had retired in 1979.

== Synopsis ==
Toriko is a sexually frustrated wife who gets involved in swapping games with her neighbors.

== Cast ==
- Maiko Kazama as Toriko Kano
- Izumi Shima as Teruyo Yoshida
- Rie Kitahara (北原理恵) as Yoshiko Arishima
- Baku Numata (沼田爆) as Makoto Kano
- Rika Takahara (高原リカ)

== Awards ==
3rd Yokohama Film Festival

- Won: Best Actress - Maiko Kazama
