= Haru (1996 film) =

- Japanese film poster
- Directed by: Yoshimitsu Morita
- Screenplay by: Yoshimitsu Morita
- Produced by: Katsuhiko Aoki; Kazuko Misawa
- Starring: Eri Fukatsu; Masaaki Uchino; Kazufumi Miyazawa
- Cinematography: Hiroshi Takase
- Edited by: Shinji Tanaka
- Music by: Soichi Noriki; Toshihiko Sahashi
- Production companies: Towa International; Triarts; News Corporation
- Distributed by: Toho
- Release date: March 9, 1996 (Japan)
- Running time: 118 minutes
- Country: Japan

Haru (Japanese: （ハル）) is a 1996 Japanese romance film written and directed by Yoshimitsu Morita. The film is about a young man and woman who fall in love through the internet.

== Plot ==
Noboru Hayami was an active American football player when he was a student, but after giving up on his career as a player due to worsening back disease, he lost sight of his dreams and has been living the life of an ordinary office worker in Tokyo. One day, he accesses a film forum on his computer. Hayami, who participated under the handle "Haru" from "Hayaminoboru", hit it off with a user using the handle "Hoshi" and began exchanging e-mails via computer. Their relationship was such that they did not reveal their true faces to each other, but Haru was impressed by Hoshi's sincere response, and they started talking about their concerns.

However, "Hoshi"'s true identity is not the man living in Tokyo that Hoshi claimed to be, but a woman named Mitsue Fujima who lives in Morioka. Hoshi "Hoshi" was also traumatized by the loss of her lover, and was constantly changing jobs. "Hoshi" told her that she had pretended to be a man, but the relationship of trust between her and Haru never collapsed. Hoshi is being followed by Tobe, who is a close friend of her late lover. Also, Hoshi is attracted to Yamagami, the president of the company, who proposes marriage to her.

One day, "Haru" decides to go on a business trip to Tohoku. When Hoshi hears this, he promises to see Haru off on the Shinkansen at a certain point along the line. By holding a video camera in one hand and waving a handkerchief to mark them, they filmed Hoshi standing along the railroad tracks and Haru in the car, allowing them to meet for just a moment from a distance. It was a vivid moment that confirmed that the other person was a real person.

"Haru" had previously met a woman using the handle "Rose" on a movie forum, and "Hoshi" misunderstood their relationship. "Haru" tries to have a conversation to clear up the misunderstanding, but "Rose" is actually "Hoshi"'s sister, and upon learning this fact, "Hoshi" is shocked and stops communicating with "Haru". However, "Hoshi" realizes that the email conversation with "Haru" up until now has been a source of emotional support, and "Hoshi" decides to meet "Haru", and they meet at the platform of Tokyo Station.

The two finally meet at the south end of the Tohoku Shinkansen platform. The two, Mitsue Fujima and Noboru Hayami, look at each other and say "Nice to meet you" to each other.

== Release ==
Haru was released on March 9, 1996 where it was distributed by Toho. Haru was shown at the Asia Pacific Media Center in Los Angeles on September 4, 1996.

== Awards ==
18th Yokohama Film Festival

- Won: Best Actress - Eri Fukatsu
- Won: Best Screenplay - Yoshimitsu Morita
- 4th Best Film
