= Maiko Kazama =

Japanese actress

- Born: May 25, 1956 (age 69); Nagasaki Prefecture, Japan
- Occupation: Actress

Maiko Kazama (風間舞子, Kazama Maiko) is a Japanese actress known especially for her roles in Nikkatsu's Roman Porno series of films in the early 1980s.

== Life and career ==
Kazama was born in Nagasaki Prefecture, Japan on May 25, 1956. She began her acting career at least as early as December 1979 with the Shintōhō Eiga pink film Jokyoushi maruhi oshieteageru (女教師（秘）教えてあげる) directed by Kaoru Umezawa. During the first half of 1980 she made several more pink films for Shintōhō Eiga, Million Film and other studios including Waisetsu dokyumento renzoku henshitsu ma (ワイセツドキュメント 連続変質魔), directed by Itsumichi Isomura and co-starring Shirō Shimomoto released by Shintōhō Eiga in March 1980.

She appeared in her first film for Nikkatsu in July 1980, the Roman Porno release Secret of Newlywed Wife (単身赴任 新妻の秘密, Tanshin Funin: Niizuma no Himitsu) directed by Shōgorō Nishimura. Pink film critics Thomas & Yuko Mihara Weisser credit Nishimura, who wrote and directed several of her features, with discovering and nurturing Kazama as a Nikkatsu actress and claim that though not a beautiful woman, she "smells of sex." Two months after this film, Nishimura directed Kazama in a vehicle suited to her talents in an attempt to give Nikkatsu a new star to replace Naomi Tani who had retired in 1979. The film, Woman Who Cries (泣く女, Naku Onna), was the first of the four-part "Woman Who ..." series all starring Kazama. The second film in the series, Woman Who Arches Her Back (のけぞる女, Nokezoru Onna), directed by Akira Katō, was released in November 1980. The third entry in the series Woman Who Exposes Herself came out in January 1981. Kazama's acting in this film won her the award for Best Actress at the 3rd Yokohama Film Festival. The final film in the series, the June 1981 Woman Who Is Used (あそばれる女, Asobareru onna), was directed by Masaru Konuma, who had also directed Woman Who Exposes Herself. The Weissers comment that throughout the series "Kazama's acting ability always shines through."

By this time, according to the Weissers, Kazama had become Nikkatsu's "biggest actress of the '80s." In September 1981, Kazama was paired with Nikkatsu director Takashi Sugano in another film tailor-made for her, Poaching Wife: Frustrated Inside (密漁妻 奥のうずき, Mitsuryōzuma: okuno uzuki), where she plays a sexually aggressive woman who finds ecstasy in witnessing a murder. Kazama worked with director Sugano once more in April 1982 in Live Recording: Secret Video (生録盗聴ビデオ, Namadori Tocho Video) in which she again plays a wayward wife. The Weissers consider this film and the earlier Poaching Wife: Frustrated Inside to be two of her best efforts. The Japanese Movie Database lists the July 1982 release Marked Ama: Stirred-Up Shell (くいこみ海女 乱れ貝, Kuikomi ama: midaregai) as Kazama's last film for Nikkatsu, a movie in which she plays only a minor role.

Kazama also had small parts in two 1982 mainstream movies, Tattoo Ari and Weekend Shuffle. In April 1987, Kazama married comedian Susumu Kimura and settled in Osaka.

== Filmography ==
- Jokyoushi maruhi oshieteageru (女教師（秘）教えてあげる) (Dec. 1979, Shintōhō Eiga)
- Waisetsu dokyumento renzoku henshitsu ma (ワイセツドキュメント 連続変質魔)' (Mar. 1980, Shintōhō Eiga)
- Secret of Newlywed Wife (単身赴任 新妻の秘密, Tanshin Funin: Niizuma no Himitsu) (July 1980, Nikkatsu)
- Woman Who Cries (泣く女, Naku Onna) (Sept. 1980, Nikkatsu)
- Woman Who Arches Her Back (のけぞる女, Nokezoru Onna) (Nov. 1980, Nikkatsu)
- Woman Who Exposes Herself (Jan. 1981, Nikkatsu)
- Lady Caligula In Tokyo (東京カリギュラ夫人, Tōkyō Caligula fujin) (Mar. 1981, Nikkatsu)
- "Love Me Strong... Love Me Hard" (もっと激しくもっとつよく, Motto hageshiku motto tsuyoku) (May 1981, Nikkatsu)
- Woman Who Is Used (あそばれる女, Asobareru onna) (June 1981, Nikkatsu)
- Poaching Wife: Frustrated Inside (密漁妻 奥のうずき, Mitsuryōzuma: okuno uzuki) (Sept. 1981, Nikkatsu)
- Rapewoman: Dirty Sunday (レイプウーマン 淫らな日曜日, Rapewoman: midarana nichiyobi) (Nov. 1981, Nikkatsu)
- Sexy Pudding: Almost Addictive (セクシー・ぷりん 癖になりそう, Sexy pudding: kuse ni narisō) (Dec. 1981, Nikkatsu)
- Nurses' Journal: Animal In the Afternoon (看護婦日記 獣じみた午後, Kangofu nikki: kemono jimita gogo) (Feb. 1982, Nikkatsu)
- Onna jimuin: shikijo seikatsu (女事務員 色情生活) (Feb. 1982, Nikkatsu)
- Live Recording: Secret Video (生録盗聴ビデオ, Namadori Tocho Video) (Apr. 1982, Nikkatsu)
- Tattoo Ari (ＴＡＴＴＯＯ＜刺青＞あり, TATTOO <shisei> Ari) (June 1982, Takahashi Prod.)
- Marked Ama: Stirred-Up Shell (くいこみ海女 乱れ貝, Kuikomi ama: midaregai) (July 1982, Nikkatsu)
- Weekend Shuffle (ウィークエンド・シャッフル, Wīkuendo Shaffuru) (Oct. 1982, Joypack)
