= Detective Story (1983 film) =

- Directed by: Kichitaro Negishi
- Written by: Toshio Kamata; Haruhiko Arai (uncredited)
- Based on: Detective Story by Jirō Akagawa
- Produced by: Haruki Kadokawa; Mitsuru Kurosawa
- Starring: Hiroko Yakushimaru; Yūsaku Matsuda
- Music by: Kazuhiko Katō
- Production company: Haruki Kadokawa
- Distributed by: Toei Company
- Release date: July 16, 1983
- Country: Japan
- Language: Japanese
- Box office: ¥2.8 billion (Japan rentals)

Detective Story (Japanese: 探偵物語, Hepburn: Tantei Monogatari) is a 1983 Japanese film directed by Kichitaro Negishi.

== Synopsis ==
Naomi is a rich university student about to leave on a trip to America. Her father hires detective Shuichi Tsujiyama to watch over her, a situation that pleases neither Naomi or Shuichi. Things get complicated when Shuichi's ex-wife is suspected in the murder of a love hotel manager. Naomi and Shuichi join up to investigate the murder which may involve yakuza gangsters.

== Cast ==
- Hiroko Yakushimaru as Naomi Arai
- Yūsaku Matsuda as Shuichi Tsujiyama
- Risa Akikawa (秋川リサ) as Yukiko Naoki
- Kyōko Kishida as Kimie Hasenuma
- Yuki Kitazume (北詰友樹) as Yutaka Nagai
- Miwa Sakagami (坂上味和) as Masako Shindo
- Strong Kongō (ストロング金剛) as Wada
- Noboru Mitani (三谷昇) as the Love hotel manager
- Susumu Fujita as Gozo Kunizaki
- Akiko Nakamura as Michiyo Kunizaki

== Background ==
Detective Story, director Negishi's third mainstream film, was based on a novel by mystery writer Jirō Akagawa. Lead actor Yūsaku Matsuda also played the role of a detective (Shunsaku Kudo) in the 1979-1980 TV series Tantei Monogatari (Detective Story) but the film is unrelated to the TV series. The film was released in Japan on VHS tape in December 1989, and as a DVD in December 2000.

== Reception ==
It became the number two Japanese film on the domestic market in 1983, earning ¥2.8 billion in distributor rental income, behind Antarctica, and also the second highest-grossing Japanese film of all time.

== Awards and nominations ==
8th Hochi Film Award

- Won: Best Actor – Yūsaku Matsuda
