= The Family Game =

- Film poster
- Directed by: Yoshimitsu Morita
- Written by: Yohei Honma (novel); Yoshinori Kobayashi; Yoshimitsu Morita
- Produced by: Yutaka Okada; Shirō Sasaki
- Starring: Yūsaku Matsuda; Juzo Itami; Saori Yuki
- Cinematography: Yonezo Maeda
- Edited by: Akimasa Kawashima
- Production companies: Art Theatre Guild; Nikkatsu
- Distributed by: Circle Films
- Release date: 4 June 1983 (Japan)
- Running time: 107 minutes
- Language: Japanese

The Family Game (Japanese: 家族ゲーム, Hepburn: Kazoku Gēmu) is a 1983 Japanese comedy and family drama film directed by Yoshimitsu Morita. It follows the story of a nuclear family of four whose father hires a tutor for the younger son, a distracted and low-ranking middle school student who will soon be taking his high school entrance exam. The idiosyncratic tutor soon becomes a father figure for the boy, as the father is distant and unfeeling. Through his interactions with the family, he shakes up the emotional shallowness and artificiality that ties them together. The "game" of the title refers to family interactions based on the roles that each member is expected to play and not on genuine emotional ties. It was the first major film by the director and is an example of postmodern cinema. The film contains elements of black humor and social satire.

The Family Game is considered one of the best Japanese films by film critics. Kinema Junpo, the premiere film magazine of Japan, ranked it as the 10th best Japanese film of all time (in 2009), the best Japanese film of the 1980s (in 2018), and the best Japanese film of the year (in 1983). The film was also selected as the best Japanese film of 1983 by the BFI. The movie missed the Japan Academy Prize for the Best Picture (losing out to Palme d'Or Winner The Ballad of Narayama).

== Plot ==
The Numata family consists of the father, Kōsuke (Juzo Itami); mother, Chikako (Saori Yuki); and two sons, Shinichi (Jun'ichi Tsujita) and Shigeyuki (Ichirōta Miyagawa). The family lives together in a small apartment located in a newly built complex of reclaimed land in Tokyo Bay. Mr. Numata is a salaryman who is physically and emotionally absent. Mrs. Numata is a stay-at-home mom who is devoid of other relationships or hobbies and is emotionally drained from caring for her two teenage sons. Shinichi, the elder son, is in a first-rate high school and makes his father proud. Shigeyuki, the younger son, is nearing the end of junior high school and will soon be taking the high school entrance exam. However, Shigeyuki's grades are poor, and he is only interested in roller coasters. He is also bullied at school by a group of fellow students, led by his one-time best friend.

The father has very high expectations for his children - they must go to a top high school which must then be followed by a prestigious national university, etc. He had hired multiple private tutors for Shigeyuki to no avail. He finds a new tutor, Yoshimoto (Yūsaku Matsuda), for Shigeyuki and places all responsibilities for his exam on him. Yoshimoto is eccentric; however, he fills in the role of father that Mr. Numata has vacated. He kisses Shigeyuki on the cheek and sits close to him to hold conversations in a near whisper; he also hits Shigeyuki to assert discipline. He makes it clear to Shigeyuki that his attention, concern and even affection are devoted to him. Even though Yoshimoto is a seventh-year student from a third-rate university, Shigeyuki’s marks improve significantly under his guidance. Yoshimoto also teaches Shigeyuki basic self-defense, which Shigeyuki puts to use against his main school bully, who was once his best friend. Eventually he passes the exam for the high school. At a family dinner celebration, with all five main characters present, a food fight breaks out and Yoshimoto begins to riot, throwing spaghetti around wildly, pouring wine indiscriminately on the table and hitting the Numatas. He flips the dinner table over, picks up his belongings and leaves via the next ferry.

The months pass. Shigeyuki attends high school, while Shinichi becomes insecure of his brother's success and enrolls in a karate class. The film ends in a surreal sequence where a lonely Mrs. Numata checks in on her sons, finding Shigeyuki asleep at his desk and Shinichi lying asleep near him on the floor. A loud helicopter encircles the apartment block. In an attempt to drown out the sound, she shuts the window and draws the curtains. Suddenly exhausted herself, Mrs. Numata falls asleep at the dinner table over her miniature woodwork.

== Cast ==
- Yūsaku Matsuda as Katsu Yoshimoto: a student at a minor university whose background and private life are undisclosed. He is unmarried and has a beautiful girlfriend. He shows some generosity in the film but his external persona is blunt and arrogant. He carries a botanical encyclopedia with him and looks at it when he tutors Shigeyuki.
- Juzo Itami as Kōsuke Numata: The patriarch of the family; he is the Numata that we see least, as most of the time he is at work or getting drunk and arriving home at night. He does not like to get directly involved in the raising and education of his children, leaving that work to his wife and to tutor Yoshimoto.
- Saori Yuki as Chikako Numata: The mother, she is treated as a servant and sometimes berated by the males of the house. Her hobby is leather crafting.
- Ichirōta Miyagawa as Shigeyuki Numata, the younger brother: a third-year junior high school students who ranks 9th in his class, counting from the bottom. He loves roller coasters.
- Junichi Tsujita as Shinichi Numata, the older brother. He attends a top high school and early in the film is considered a model son by the father. Throughout the film his interest in studying decreases. He has a crush on a girl from his class, but she does not seem very interested in him.
- Yoko Aki as Yoshimoto's girlfriend.
- Jun Togawa as Neighbor's wife

== Genre ==
=== The Family Drama Tradition in Japan ===
The family drama is a popular and influential film genre in Japan. Films in the genre tell stories in which many of the main characters are members of the same family. The stories revolve around how the family members respond to challenges. Both Yasujirō Ozu and Mikio Naruse, amongst the very best of Japan’s “golden age,” worked often in the genre. Almost all of Ozu’s post-war films were family dramas. Yoji Yamada and Hirokazu Kore-eda, amongst the most famous directors of their generation, have also directed many acclaimed family dramas.

Japanese family dramas are often about the deterioration of family ties. Pre-war films frequently attributed blame for this loss to the forces of urbanization and economic modernization which led to a decline in family cohesion (as in Ozu's The Only Son). Post-war films often criticized the younger generation’s disrespect towards their parents, with the parents sometimes portrayed as paragons of devotion (as in Kinoshita's Tragedy of Japan). In the postmodern cinema, blame can shift to the “salaryman," the typical, white-collared salaried employee, who is shown to be a neglectful or ineffectual father in many films, including The Family Game. These fathers are weak and work-oriented and avoid their family obligations; the children are not able to depend on them for emotional support or moral guidance.

== Style ==
=== Sound Design ===
Acoustically, the film was recorded very close to the actors – with microphones that could capture the softest ambient sounds and magnify them so that they would interfere with the ability of the characters to communicate – highlighting the alienation of the characters. Another alienating technique utilized by the filmmakers in two scenes was to make all sounds inaudible except for the ambient sounds – thereby making the character’s voices inaccessible to the audience; this happens first in a conversation between Shinichi and a female classmate, and then again when Shinichi and mother are listening to and talking about an American song that the audience cannot hear.

=== Visual Design ===
The average shot length (ASL) of The Family Game is 23 seconds, and according to Barry Salt the ASL of the average film directed from 1982 to 1987 was only 6 seconds.

In the Numata household, characters often inhabit the frame in claustrophobically close proximity. This is highlighted by the filmmaker’s emphasis on closeups indoors and long shots out of doors. The father is the main character most typically presented in medium shots (dominated by ambient sounds). On the other hand, the tutor, Yoshimoto, is more frequently presented in close ups (and a more balanced soundtrack). An example of this technique occurs in the scene when Shigeyuki's classmate, Tsuchiya, suddenly appears in the Numata's front door; Morita is able to include all five characters in one cramped shot, each with a different expression on their face.

== Themes ==
=== Overview ===
The film focuses on a dysfunctional middle-class nuclear family—each family member is connected not internally, but through the social roles they are expected to take on, and the pressure of these social expectations further accelerates the breakdown in their communication. Individual worth becomes quantified chiefly in terms of success and class ranking. According to Donald Richie, the "game" that the family plays is an "enactment the members agree to go through with, a set-up filled with tricks and dodges, a kind of gamble the results of which are not serious." The Numata household is like a model home display - inside of it the characters engage in more role-playing than "real life" living. As the girl student who has a crush on Shigeyuki states in one scene, it is better to get along and curry favor with the group than to be true to oneself.

The tutor, Yoshimoto, is the only main character who consistently deviates from the "game" and becomes a more genuine father figure for Shigeyuki. Yoshimoto, unlike the parents, develops an intimate relationship with the boy. He kisses him on the cheek when they first meet, sits near him, places his hand on the boy's bare thigh after his fight with a classmate, teaches him martial arts, and even gives him a piggyback ride after the entrance exam. The tutor through this physicality and his concern for the boy provides him an alternative relationship based on human warmth.

Japanese critics saw the film as showing the change to a new epoch and a post-modern sensibility. One said that if Japanese before and during the high growth economy defined their reality first though "ideals" and then through "dreams," and tried to change reality according to those visions, then in the post-high growth era, from the mid-1970s on, they no longer tried to change reality but to remain content with reality as "fiction." The Numatas' table is not unrealistic but fixes the "un-naturalness" of reality itself in an age when families watch television while eating. This epochal shift was marked, another critic said, by Morita's films and the works of novelist Haruki Murakami and musician Sakamoto Ryuichi, leading to a culture which celebrates meaninglessness. One scholar saw in the film an inversion of the traditional Ozu family, which she wrote was "reserved, considerate, and gourmet." Morita's film overturns this framework through shock value, bizarre framing, deadpan food fights, sexual innuendo and even homosexual undertones.

=== Commodification ===
The father rather than devoting his own time to his younger son’s education offers the tutor a financial incentive to help his son get better grades. The attitude of the father is that his son’s education is a commercial venture that he is invested in properly funding so that it will pay off with dividends in the future. The tutor’s attitude is different, he shows a parental concern that will not be remunerated.

Morita associates various characters in the film with an object. Such as the father and his soymilk carton, the mother and her leatherwork, the tutor and his flora encyclopedia, the older brother and his telescope, the younger brother and his spacewarp. Murakami Tomohiko argues that these associations are a filmic equivalent to the commodity catalogues in Japanese fashion magazines of the 1980s.

=== Last Dinner Scene ===
The five main characters celebrate Shigeyuki's success with his entrance exam with a sumptuous dinner towards the end of the film. The whole dinner scene is captured in an 8-minute static long take, which shows the characters looking in the direction of the camera seated on the straight table with tutor Yoshimoto in the middle. The dinner devolves into a verbal altercation between father and older son about the boy's future education and then into a food fight involving the four males, provoked by Yoshimoto's antics. Finally, Yoshimoto hits each member of the family once into the ground before making his leave. Many critics have commented on this dinner scene as it is the most famous and iconic scene of the film.

Tadao Sato commented on the influence of Ozu on The Family Game. Ozu liked to seat family members facing the same direction in order to show the unity of their feelings. Morita deliberately makes use of this Ozu-esque device in the dinner scene. But in the new Japanese culture represented by the Numatas, the linear composition no longer means accord, and instead their seating in close proximity results in conflict.

Keiko Mcdonald wrote that the "hero" (Yoshimoto) is formally accepted into the Numata's club through this dinner, but then promptly decides to leave that club. She notes that thanks to Yoshimoto's disorderly behavior, the family members are for the first time able to express emotions that they would always keep repressed.

Vincent Canby noted that the tutor acts like an "avenging angel" and shows the Numatas what he really thinks about them through his violence. He goes on to say, "This one-man riot is the humanist's only response to the genteel inhumanism we've been witnessing throughout the film."

== Reception ==
Vincent Canby, writing for the New York Times in 1984, praised the “extraordinary visual design” and also wrote that "The Family Game is so rich that Mr. Morita would seem to be one of the most talented and original of Japan's new generation of film makers."

== TV Series ==
The Family Game was adapted into a TV series in 2013 by Fuji TV, starring Sho Sakurai as the tutor Kōya Yoshimoto.

== Bibliography ==
- Gerow, Aaron (2008). "Playing with Postmodernism: Morita Yoshimitsu's Family Game". In Phillips, Alastair; Stringer, Julian (eds.). Japanese Cinema: Texts and Contexts. Routledge. pp. 240–252. ISBN 978-0-415-32848-7.
- Iles, Timothy (February 1, 2017). "Families, Fathers, Film: Changing Images from Japanese Cinema". Contemporary Japan. 19 (1): 189–206. doi:10.1080/09386491.2008.11826956.
- McDonald, Keiko (2005). Reading a Japanese Film: Cinema in Context (Illustrated ed.). University of Hawaii Press. ISBN 978-0-8248-2939-1.
