= Anna Nakagawa =

Japanese actress (1965-2014)

- Nakagawa as Emmy Kano in Godzilla vs. King Ghidorah (1991)
- Born: 30 August 1965; Suginami, Tokyo, Japan
- Died: 17 October 2014 (aged 49)
- Occupation: Actress

Anna Nakagawa (中川安奈, Nakagawa Anna), real name Anna Kuriyama (栗山安奈, Kuriyama Anna) (August 30, 1965 – October 17, 2014) was a Japanese actress. She won the award for best actress at the 11th Yokohama Film Festival for A Sign Days.

== Death ==
Nakagawa died on October 17, 2014, from endometrial cancer at the age of 49.

== Filmography ==
- The Silk Road (1988)
- A Sign Days (1989)
- Godzilla vs. King Ghidorah (1991)
- Camp de aimashou (1995)
- Cure (1997)
- Code geass (2006)
