= Kamui Gaiden =

2009 Japanese film directed by Yōichi Sai

- Theatrical poster
- Directed by: Yōichi Sai
- Screenplay by: Yōichi Sai; Kankurō Kudō
- Based on: Kamui Gaiden by Sampei Shirato
- Produced by: Akira Morishige; Yui Tamae
- Starring: Kenichi Matsuyama; Koyuki; Ekin Cheng; Kōichi Satō; Hideaki Itō
- Cinematography: Tomoo Ezaki; Junichi Fujisawa
- Edited by: Isao Kawase
- Music by: Taro Iwashiro
- Production companies: Horipro; Shochiku; Shogakukan; Shueisha; Yahoo Japan
- Distributed by: Shochiku
- Release date: September 16, 2009
- Running time: 120 minutes
- Country: Japan
- Language: Japanese
- Budget: $18 million
- Box office: $11,891,739

Kamui Gaiden (Japanese: カムイ外伝) is a 2009 Japanese action drama film directed by Yōichi Sai, based on Sanpei Shirato's manga series of the same title. The film is written by Sai and Kankurō Kudō, starring Kenichi Matsuyama in the title role. It premiered at Toronto International Film Festival on September 16, 2009, to mixed reviews. The English version was released as Kamui and the film was retitled Kamui: The Lone Ninja on home video.

== Plot ==
The young Kamui is a runaway ninja who has abandoned his clan, now constantly pursued by assassins. His travels bring him to a seashore village where he meets Hanbei, a fisherman who shares the former ninja's sense of honor. Though Hanbei's wife is wary of the stranger, the fisherman and Kamui become good friends. Life at the seaside seems idyllic but Kamui does not get to enjoy the peace for very long when his past life is catching up on him, and everything and everyone is not as it seems. Now he must draw upon his shadowy arts if he hopes to escape with his life.

== Cast ==
- Kenichi Matsuyama as Kamui
- Kaoru Kobayashi as Hanbei
- Koyuki as Sugaru
- Kōichi Satō as Gumbei
- Hideaki Itō as Fudo
- Suzuka Ohgo as Sayaka
- Ekin Cheng as Dumok
- Sei Ashina as Mikumo
- Yûta Kanai as Yoshito
- Yukio Sakaguchi as Imperial Guard

== Production and release ==
Kamui Gaiden was filmed in 2007–2008 at Nago, Okinawa. On April 1, 2011, Matsuyama married Koyuki whom he has met on the set of Kamui. In addition to Toronto Film Festival, it was also screened at London Film Festival in 2009, as well as at Rotterdam International Film Festival, Sci-Fi-London, the Asian Film Festival of Dallas and the Durban International Film Festival in 2010. The film was released as Kamui in the English version, and as Kamui: The Lone Ninja for the 2010 UK DVD and Blu-ray Disc releases by Manga Entertainment; it was also re-titled as Kamui – The Last Ninja by Cine-Asia in Germany.

== Reception ==
English-language critical reception of the film was generally mixed. Rob Nelson of Variety wrote that "this would-be epic needs more show and less tell" as it "comes to a crawl too often over its two-hour running time," but applauded Matsuyama as "perfect as the brooding title character." Alternatively, DVD Talk's David Johnson said "it makes Scott Pilgrim vs. The World look like The Pianist" and "if you can get past the laughably bad effects work, there's ridiculous fun to be had with Kamui." Eye for Film gave the film 4 out of 5 stars, applauding its "immense visual beauty" which helps to "keep the viewer entertained and enthralled." Tony Rayns even called it "probably the best ninja movie ever made." However, Andrew Heskins of EasternKicks, which gave the film 3 out of 5 stars, commented on Rayns' opinion by saying this would be true only if "your reference point is Ninja Assassin or Teenage Mutant Ninja Turtles", but called the film enjoyable. Kurt Halfyard of Twitch Film wrote that "function and value of art is a pretty high minded premise for a simple, populist action-melodrama" and "the collection of underwater, tree-top and sea-side ninja battles are not enough to enliven the whole turgid affair," adding that "Shinobi offers a more compelling scenario and characters and that is not saying much." Heroic Cinema, rating the film 6/10, stated that "when it comes to a movie that could have been great —should have been great— that's a whole new level of disappointment." Cinema Verdict reviewer rated it 5/10, also finding Kamui to be a disappointment, "built upon a story and characters who didn't capture my attention with its overall fake look." Nevertheless, James Mudge of BeyondHollywood.com wrote that Kamui "stands out as one of the better examples of the ninja genre," stating that Sai brought "Sanpei Shirato's vision to life without too much grand standing, and the film is all the more enjoyable for paying equal amounts of attention to character and excitement."

== See also ==
- Kamui the Ninja (Ninpu Kamui Gaiden), an anime adaptation of the manga series.
