= Crazy Fruit =

Japanese name
- Kanji: 狂った果実
- Directed by: Kichitaro Negishi
- Based on: Kurutta kajitsu by Shintaro Ishihara
- Starring: Yūji Honma; Yuki Ninagawa
- Cinematography: Minoru Yoneda
- Edited by: Akimasa Kawashima
- Production company: Nikkatsu
- Release date: April 24, 1981
- Running time: 85 minutes
- Country: Japan
- Language: Japanese

Crazy Fruit aka Crazed Fruit (狂った果実, Kurutta kajitsu) is a 1981 Japanese film in Nikkatsu's Roman porno series, directed by Kichitaro Negishi. Both this film and the earlier (1956) version by Nikkatsu, Crazed Fruit, were based on a novel of the same name by Shintaro Ishihara.

== Synopsis ==
A working class young man, Tetsuo, who distrusts all rich people, falls in love with a girl, Chika, from an affluent family. He has a difficult time, but love survives despite the problems.

== Cast ==
- Yūji Honma (本間優二) as Tetsuo
- Yuki Ninagawa as Chika
- Eiko Nagashima as Harue
- Eiji Okada as Tono, Chika's step father
- Nobutaka Masutomi (益富信孝) as Osawa, Harue's husband
- Kinuko Obata (小畠絹子) as Tetsuo's mother

== Reception ==
The Weissers call the plot "a sadly contrived story" and award it two and a half stars out of four, but laud Yūji Honma's "intense performance" which made the film a major hit for the Nikkatsu studio.

== Home media ==
Crazy Fruit was released as a DVD by Uplink (アップリンク) on May 23, 2003.

== Awards and nominations ==
3rd Yokohama Film Festival

- Won: Best Director - Kichitaro Negishi
