= Sanshirō (novel) =

Novel by Natsume Sōseki

- Author: Sōseki Natsume
- Translator: Jay Rubin
- Language: Japanese
- Publisher: The Asahi Shimbun (newspaper)
- Publication date: 1908
- Publication place: Japan
- English publication date: 1977
- Media type: Print
- Preceded by: The Miner
- Followed by: The Gate

Sanshirō (三四郎) is a 1908 Japanese novel by Sōseki Natsume. It is the first in a trilogy, followed by Sorekara (1909) and The Gate (1910).

Sanshirō describes the experiences of its titular character, Sanshirō Ogawa, a young man from the Kyushu countryside of southern Japan, as he arrives at the University of Tokyo and becomes acquainted with his new surroundings, fellow students, and professors.

== Plot summary ==
As the novel begins, Sanshirō Ogawa has graduated from high school in Kumamoto, Kyushu, and is riding the train north to pursue his graduate studies at the University of Tokyo. During his second day on the train, a young woman asks Sanshirō for help with lodgings when they stop in Nagoya for the night, and they end up in the same room with a single futon. She attempts to bathe with him, but Sanshirō sidesteps her openings for intimacy. As they part ways the next morning, she castigates him for his cowardice.

On his third and final day of travel, Sanshirō encounters an enigmatic man who casually declares that Japan is rushing toward its own destruction. The man also warns him against avarice and the hidden dangers that lurk beneath the smooth surfaces of society. Sanshirō later comes to know this man as Professor Hirota, a high school English teacher and amateur philosopher.

At the university, Sanshirō seeks out a physics researcher named Nonomiya, whom his mother introduces through a family connection. He also meets a fellow liberal arts student named Yojirō who advises him on how to navigate the academic environment. Both Nonomiya and Yojirō are protégés of Professor Hirota, and these three academics, along with Yoshiko (Nonomiya's younger sister) and Mineko (the younger sister of another Hirota protégé), form Sanshirō's core circle of acquaintances.

As he settles into his new life in Tokyo, Sanshirō recognizes three distinct worlds of which he belongs. The first is his hometown in Kyushu, specifically, his connection to his mother there. The second is the intellectual world, where thinkers such as Professor Hirota and Nonomiya lose themselves in pursuit of academic learning. The third world is the realm of human emotions, into which Sanshirō is drawn through his affection for Mineko.

The novel includes a comical subplot in which Yojirō, an incorrigible meddler, campaigns discreetly on behalf of Professor Hirota, hoping to have him appointed to the university faculty in the College of Letters. Yojirō pens an essay for the Literary Review under a pen name, expounding the benefits of a native Japanese appointment and all but nominating Professor Hirota as the man for the post. His scheming backfires terribly when a rival camp fingers Sanshirō as the author and publicly questions the professor's integrity, after which Yojirō is forced to come clean with the professor and endure his wrath afterward.

Throughout the novel, Sanshirō and Mineko mutually feel some attraction for the other, but both, in their own ways, are resigned to their respective fates. Older men, established in their careers, court Mineko, and she is eventually married off, by arrangement, to an acquaintance of her elder brother. Meanwhile, Sanshirō is under pressure from his mother to marry a local Kyushu girl to whose family his own has strong ties. Neither Sanshirō nor Mineko are assertive enough to defy convention—in the end, they let their romance regrettably fall by the wayside.

== Characters ==
- Sanshirō Ogawa – The main character of the novel, Sanshirō is 22 years old (23 by Japanese Meiji-era counting). As the novel opens, he has recently graduated from high school (equivalent to modern-day college) in Kumamoto is traveling to Tokyo to pursue graduate studies at the University of Tokyo in the College of Liberal Arts.
- Sōhachi Nonomiya – Cousin of an acquaintance of Sanshirō's mother. At his mother's suggestion, Sanshirō calls on Nonomiya during his first days in Tokyo and receives Nonomiya's guidance in orienting himself in his new surroundings. Nonomiya is a 29-year-old experimental physicist on the College of Science staff who leads a team to measure the electromagnetic pressure of light waves. He is courting Mineko, but their rational and romantic views of the world are often at odds.
- Yojirō Sasaki – An elective studies 'special student' in the College of Liberal Arts. Yojirō is endlessly scheming and meddling. His advice to Sanshirō is often valuable but occasionally detrimental. He boards with Professor Hirota, who is his former high school teacher.
- Professor Chō Hirota – A graduate of Tokyo University who teaches English at a local high school (making him the equivalent to a modern-day college professor). The professor has a philosophical bent and is somewhat of a detached observer. He is unmarried and has no great ambition to advance in his career. In addition to Yojirō, whom he has retained as a boarding student, he retains close ties with Nonomiya and the Satomi family, whose eldest brother was also a former student.
- Mineko Satomi – The beautiful and talented youngest daughter of the Satomi family, a well-to-do Christian family that is headed now by Mineko's older brother. Mineko takes a dreamy, romantic view of the world and often has a far-away look as she gazes toward the sky and watches clouds.
- Yoshiko Nonomiya – Yoshiko, who is hospitalized with illness as the novel opens, is some years younger than her older brother Sōhachi and is still a student. Early in the story, she moves in to board with the Satomi's, and she is often found in the company of Mineko.
- Haraguchi (the painter) – Another acquaintance of Professor Hirota's. Haraguchi employs Mineko as his model for a full size portrait to show in his next exhibit. In explaining to Sanshirō that painting captures spirit through attention to detail, Haraguchi focuses on the expression in Mineko's eyes, noting that in the Japanese artistic tradition, a different aesthetic has developed than in the West, where "funny-looking big eyes" are considered beautiful.

== Publication history ==
Sanshirō was first published in serialised form in the newspaper Asahi Shimbun from September 1 through December 29 of 1908. The Shunyōdō Shoten Company published it in book form in May the following year.

== Background ==
Sōseki taught as a professor at Sanshirō's alma mater 'high school' in Kumamoto from 1891 to 1894. Subsequently, and following his time abroad in London, he was given a professorship at the University of Tokyo, where the popular lecturer Lafcadio Hearn had recently resigned amidst controversy. A subplot of the novel, in which students lobby for a native Japanese appointment in the Department of Literature, is a playful reversal of the situation under which Sōseki took up his post.

== Major themes ==
Sanshirō is, in one sense, a coming-of-age novel. It follows Sanshirō as he begins to grasp the world and its possibilities and also its limitations. The novel covers just a single semester, from September to just after the New Year. Sanshirō grows and learns throughout, but his growth is incremental, and he is by no means the master of his own future.

Through Sanshirō and those around him, the novel also comments extensively on Meiji-era society and on Japan's modernization. Topics include the recently won Russo-Japanese war, Western science, the role of women in society, approaches to academic instruction, and basic human nature.

== English translation ==
Sanshirō was translated into English by Jay Rubin and published by University of Washington Press in 1977. The same translation was later reprinted by Penguin Classics in 2010, featuring a new introduction by Haruki Murakami.

== Adaptations ==
A film adaptation of the novel titled Natsume Sōseki's Sanshirō (夏目漱石の三四郎) was released in 1955, directed by Nobuo Nakagawa.

In addition, several television adaptations of the novel have been produced, including one in 1954 (Nippon TV), 1961 (NHK), 1968 (Mainichi Broadcasting System), 1974 (NHK), and 1994 (Fuji Television).
