= Keiko Saito =

Japanese actress and talent (born 1961)

- 斉藤 慶子
- Born: 14 July 1961 (age 65); Kobayashi, Miyazaki, Japan
- Occupation: Actress
- Years active: 1982–present
- Agent: Ohta Production
- Television: Taiga drama Hideyoshi; Shin Ai naru Mono e
- Spouse(s): Hiroshi Kimoto (m. 1997; div. 2008) Tadashi Nakamura (m. 2011)
- Children: 1
- Awards: 7th (1994) Nikkan Sports Film Award Supporting Actress Award (Shinonome-rō: Onna no Ran)

For the wrestler, see Keiko Saito (wrestler).

Keiko Saito (斉藤 慶子, Saitō Keiko; born 14 July 1961) is a Japanese actress and tarento.

== Filmography ==
=== Television ===
Year	Title	Role	Notes	Ref.
1991–92	Tōyama no Kin-san 4	Okon		
1996	Hideyoshi	Kitsuno	Taiga drama	
1998	Ten Urara	Misa Otaki	Asadora	
2004	Wakaba	Sachie Murakami	Asadora	

=== Films ===
Year	Title	Role	Notes	Ref.
1986	House of Wedlock	Midori Sadaoka		
1994	Shinonome-rō: Onna no Ran	Shizu		
2002	Koinu Dan no Monogatari	Aki Nomura		

=== Japanese dub ===
Year	Title	Role	Dub for	Notes	Ref.
1987	Innerspace	Lydia Maxwell	Meg Ryan		

== Discography ==
=== Singles ===
Date	Title
21 Sep 1982	Mono Omoi Season / Yūyami no Futari
5 Mar 1983	Aisa reta gatte iru kuse ni / Yasashi-sa, hitotoki
21 Sep 1983	Flashin' Back / Lovepotion
5 Aug 1984	Furi Mukeba / Lost Summer Time

=== Albums ===
Date	Title	Tracks
21 Oct 1982	Keiko, mo no Omoi...	A-1. Mono Omoi Season; A-2. Tamerai; A-3. Silhouette Romance; A-4. Yūyami no Futari; B-1. Anata o Yumemite; B-2. Sailors Fuku to Kikan Jū; B-3. A no Hi ni kaeritai; B-4. Wakareuta
21 Jun 1983	Keiko kara anata e...Lovepotion	Keiko kara anata e... (narration); Flashin' Back; Yasashi-sa, hitotoki; Happy Choice; Anata o Yumemite; Lovepotion; Natsu ni Aishite; Aisa reta gatte iru kuse ni; Forever, For Me; Lovely Night

=== Duets ===
Date	Title	With
25 Oct 1995	Kanashī Kanpai	Takao Horiuchi

== Awards and nominations ==
Year	Award	Category	Work(s)	Result	Ref.
1994	7th Nikkan Sports Film Awards	Best Supporting Actress	Shinonome-rō: Onna no Ran	Won	
1995	18th Japan Academy Film Prize	Best Supporting Actress	Shinonome-rō: Onna no Ran	Nominated	
