= The Gate (novel) =

Novel by Natsume Sōseki

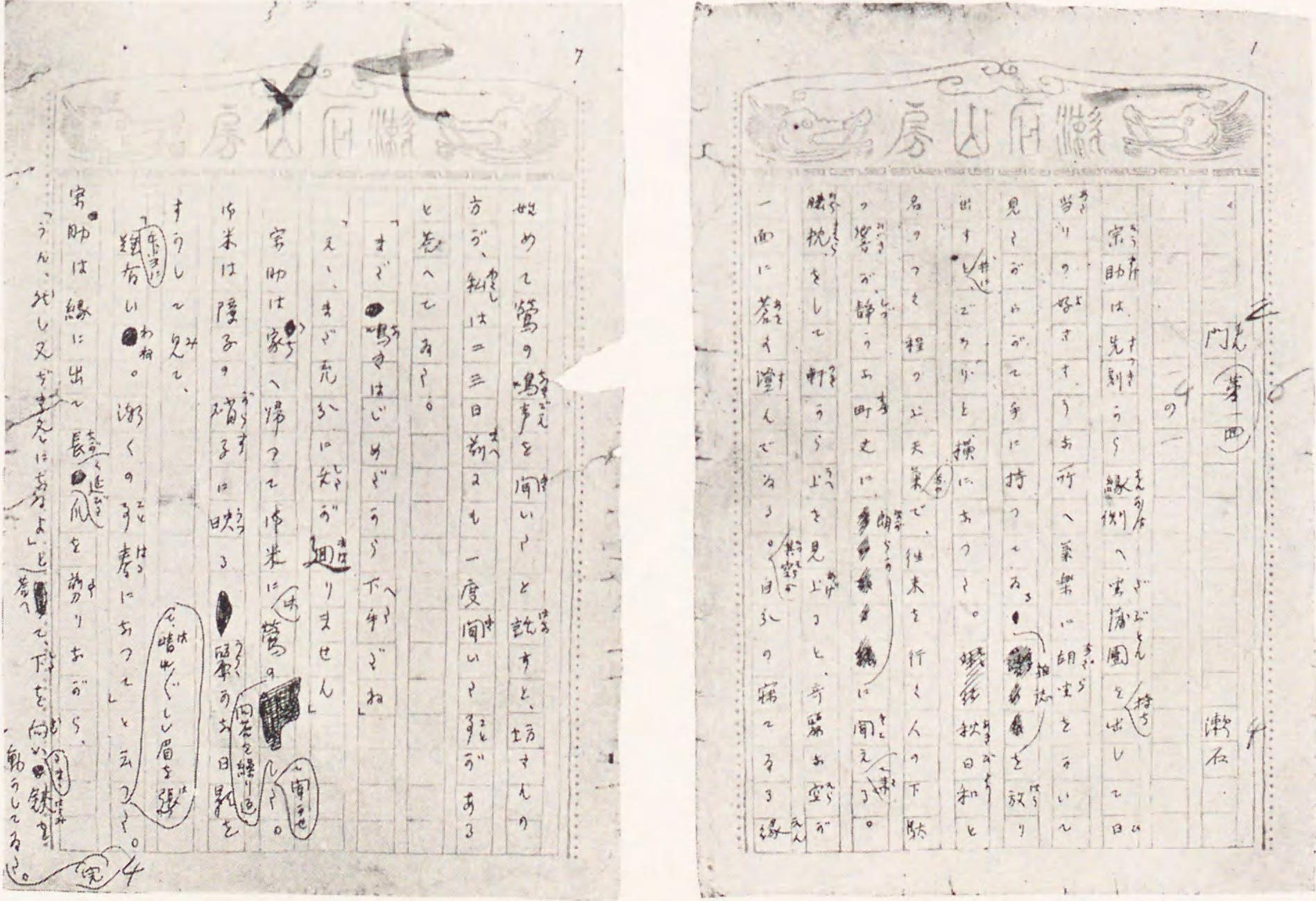
- Manuscript page of The Gate
- Author: Natsume Sōseki
- Original title: 門
- Translator: Francis Mathy (1972); William F. Sibley (2013)
- Language: Japanese
- Publisher: The Asahi Shimbun (newspaper)
- Publication date: 1910
- Publication place: Japan
- English publication date: 1972
- Media type: Print
- Preceded by: Sorekara
- Followed by: To the Spring Equinox and Beyond

The Gate (門, Mon) is a 1910 Japanese novel by Natsume Sōseki. It is the final part of a trilogy, preceded by Sanshirō (1908) and Sorekara (1909). The story follows Sosuke, who betrayed his best friend Yasui by marrying his wife Oyone, and how he seeks salvation from his guilt.

== Plot ==
The Gate concerns a middle-aged married couple, Oyone and Sosuke, who married for love in their student days. As the novel opens, they languish in ennui because they have no children and Sosuke has to focus on his career. Over the course of the novel it is revealed that Oyone was the wife of his former friend Yasui, and that Oyone and Sosuke suffered exclusion from society due to their ill-advised marriage. Oyone feels her childlessness was a punishment sent by the gods for abandoning her previous husband. When Sosuke learns that his landlord's brother has become acquainted with Yasui and wants to bring him for a visit, Sosuke flees to a Zen monastery.

== Publication history ==
The Gate first appeared in serialised form in the Asahi Shimbun newspaper between March and June 1910. The following year, it was published in book form by the Shunyodo Publishing Company.

== Background ==
Sōseki did not choose the title Mon (The Gate) himself. When his publisher needed to announce the title for his next work, Toyotaka Komiya, one of Natsume's pupils, chose the title at random from a nearby book, which happened to be Friedrich Nietzsche's Thus Spoke Zarathustra.

Though Sōseki did not identify The Gate as part of an official trilogy, scholars and critics usually consider The Gate to be the third in a series of novels starting with Sanshirō and And Then. All three novels deal with the themes of self-knowledge and responsibility – on the one hand, accountability to society, and on the other, responsibility to one's own emotions. However, the three novels do not share characters.

According to critic Pico Iyer, The Gate is a book "about what never comes to pass."The Gate focuses on detailed description of characters and setting, leaving the reader to fill in the blanks where action is left undescribed. The action that is described is often portrayed as fruitless, or as making a bad situation worse. For example, Sosuke's trip to the Zen temple only teaches him that his efforts to seek enlightenment are unlikely to succeed. The temple episode goes back to Sōseki's own experience in a temple in Kamakura.

Shortly after completing The Gate, Sōseki nearly died from an ongoing illness and its treatments, and his later works changed in tone and content.

== English translations ==
The Gate has been translated into English by Francis Mathy in 1972 and by William F. Sibley in 2013.
