= Nastasja =

- Film poster
- Directed by: Andrzej Wajda
- Written by: Fyodor Dostoyevsky; Maciej Karpiński; Andrzej Wajda
- Starring: Tamasaburo Bando; Toshiyuki Nagashima
- Cinematography: Paweł Edelman
- Music by: Małgorzata Przedpełska-Bieniek
- Release date: 1994
- Running time: 100 minutes
- Countries: Poland; Japan
- Language: Japanese

Nastasja is a Polish/Japanese film released in 1994, directed by Andrzej Wajda.

The film is an adaptation on the last chapter of Fyodor Dostoyevski's novel The Idiot, in which Prince Mishkin and Rogozin return to the past in a conversation over the dead body of Nastasja. Both Prince Mishkin and Nastasja in flashbacks are played by the same person, onnagata actor Bandō Tamasaburō V.

Wajda produced and directed Nastassya Filipovna, a stage play version of the piece, at the Stary Teatr in Kraków in 1977.
