= Something Like It =

- DVD cover

Japanese name
- Kana: の・ようなもの
Transcriptions
- Revised Hepburn: No Yōna Mono
- Directed by: Yoshimitsu Morita
- Written by: Yoshimitsu Morita
- Produced by: Hikaru Suzuki
- Starring: Katsunobu Itō; Kumiko Akiyoshi; Isao Bitō
- Cinematography: Makoto Watanabe
- Edited by: Akimasa Kawashima
- Music by: Osamu Shiomura
- Production company: Nippon Herald Films
- Release date: September 12, 1981 (Japan)
- Running time: 103 minutes
- Country: Japan
- Language: Japanese

Something Like It (Japanese: の・ようなもの, Hepburn: No Yōna Mono) is a 1981 Japanese film directed by Yoshimitsu Morita.

== Cast ==
- Katsunobu Itō as Shintoto
- Kumiko Akiyoshi as Elizabeth
- Isao Bitō

== Awards and nominations ==
3rd Yokohama Film Festival

- Won: Best Film
- Won: Best New Director - Yoshimitsu Morita
