= Shogun's Ninja =

- Theatrical release poster
- Directed by: Norifumi Suzuki
- Screenplay by: Takao Ishikawa; Ichirō Otsu; Shirō Kannami
- Starring: Hiroyuki Sanada; Sonny Chiba; Etsuko Shiomi; Shōhei Hino; Yōko Nogiwa
- Distributed by: Toei Company
- Release date: November 15, 1980 (Japan)
- Running time: 117 minutes
- Country: Japan
- Language: Japanese

Shogun's Ninja (Japanese: 忍者武芸帖 百地三太夫) also known as Ninja Bugeichō Momochi Sandayū, is a 1980 Japanese chanbara film directed by Norifumi Suzuki. Hiroyuki Sanada landed his first lead role in the film.

== Plot ==
Toyotomi Hideyoshi sends Shiranui Shōgen to Iga in search of the Momochi clan's hidden gold. Shōgen destroys the Momochi clan, but Momochi Sandayū's child Momochi Takamaru narrowly escapes to Ming China. 10 years later, he returns to Japan.

== Cast ==
- Hiroyuki Sanada : Momochi Takamaru
- Etsuko Shiomi : Ai-Lian
- Yuki Ninagawa : Otsu
- Shōhei Hino : Gosuke (Ishikawa Goemon)
- Katsumasa Uchida : Shiranui Gennosuke
- Masashi Ishibashi : Momochi Sandayū
- Akira Hamada : Akechi Mitsuhide
- Yōko Nogiwa : Chiyo
- Asao Koike : Toyotomi Hideyori
- Masumi Harukawa : Lady Yodo
- Makoto Satō : Junka no Yatoji
- Isao Natsuyagi : Hattori Hanzō
- Tetsuro Tamba : Tozawa Hakuunsai
- Sonny Chiba : Shiranui Shōgen
