= The Beast to Die =

- Film poster
- Directed by: Tōru Murakawa
- Written by: Shoichi Maruyama; Haruhiko Ohyabu
- Based on: The Beast to Die by Haruhiko Ōyabu
- Produced by: Haruki Kadokawa
- Starring: Yūsaku Matsuda; Takeshi Kaga; Hideo Murota
- Cinematography: Seizō Sengen
- Edited by: Osamu Tanaka
- Music by: Akihiko Takashima
- Distributed by: Toei Tokyo; Kadokawa Haruki Jimusho
- Release date: 4 October 1980 (Japan)
- Running time: 119 minutes
- Country: Japan
- Language: Japanese

The Beast to Die (Japanese: 野獣死すべし, Hepburn: Yajū shisubeshi) is a 1980 Japanese thriller film directed by Tōru Murakawa, produced by Haruki Kadokawa, and starring Yūsaku Matsuda. It was a remake of the 1959 film The Beast Shall Die.

== Plot ==
A Nietzschean journalist who covered the Vietnam War, Lebanese Civil War and other conflicts becomes mentally unstable and goes on a spree of robbery and murder.

== Cast ==
- Yūsaku Matsuda as Journalist
- Takeshi Kaga as Waiter, Accomplice
- Hideo Murota as Policeman
