= Agata Hikari =

Kazue Asai (浅井 和枝; January 25, 1943 – September 6, 1992), known by her pen name Agata Hikari (干刈 あがた), was a Japanese novelist and translator. She won several awards throughout her career, but was best known for her Noma Literary Prize-winning novel Shizuka ni watasu kogane no yubiwa (しずかにわたすこがねのゆびわ).

== Biography ==
Hikari was born in Tokyo, Japan on January 25, 1943. Her father was a police officer. She attended Waseda University, but dropped out and became a copywriter. After fifteen years of marriage, she divorced and began writing fiction in 1982. Hikari also worked as a translator.

Hikari's first publication was Juka no Kazoku (樹下の家族), a novel which won the Kaien New Writers Prize in 1982. Her next few works, Uhoho Tankentai (ウホッホ探険隊), Yukkuri Tōkyō Joshi Marason (ゆっくり東京女子マラソン), and Home Party (ホーム・パーティー) were all runners-up for the Akutagawa Prize. Uhoho Tankentai was adapted into the film House of Wedlock. Her 1986 Shizuka ni watasu kogane no yubiwa (しずかにわたすこがねのゆびわ) won the Noma Literary Prize. Her 1988 Kiiroi Kami (黄色い髪) was nominated for the Yamamoto Shūgorō Prize. Many of her works were also nominated for other awards. Her works frequently included themes of divorce, family relationships, and life as a woman.

Hikari died on September 6, 1992, of stomach cancer.

== Selected works ==
- Juka no Kazoku (樹下の家族), 1982
- Uhoho Tankentai (ウホッホ探険隊), 1983
- Yukkuri Tōkyō Joshi Marason (ゆっくり東京女子マラソン), 1984
- Home Party (ホーム・パーティー), 1986
- Shizuka ni watasu kogane no yubiwa (しずかにわたすこがねのゆびわ), 1986
- Kiiroi Kami (黄色い髪), 1988
