= Yuki Ninagawa =

Japanese actress

- Born: August 18, 1960 (age 65); Yokohama, Japan
- Occupation: Actress

Yuki Ninagawa (蜷川 有紀, Ninagawa Yuki; born 1960 in Yokohama) is a Japanese actress, daughter of the poet Mizuno Akiyoshi.

Her first role was in the rock opera Salome in 1978. In films, she appeared in Kurutta Kajitsu in 1981, winning a best new actress award at the Yokohama Film Festival. She had leading roles in Himeyuri Monument (1982), Modori Gawa (1983), and Hitodenashi No Koi (1992), as well as appearing on TV program "Kiryuin Hanako No Shogai". In theatre, Ninagawa appeared in Yukio Ninagawa's modern adaptation of the Kabuki masterpiece Kanadehon Chūshingura. In 2004, she wrote, directed, and starred in the film Barameraba, based on a short story by Seijun Suzuki.

Her graphic exhibition Baramekutoki won an Art of The Year Award from the Japan Information Culturology Society and was hosted by the Tokyu Bunkamura gallery in 2008. In 2010, her exhibition on the theme "Strange & Enchanting" was hosted as Yuki Ninagawa Drawing Exhibition: Baramandara at Ueno and Daimaru Shinsaibashi. Her work was used as the title visual for the TV-TOKYO 45th anniversary special drama Nene—Onna Taikouki and appeared on the cover of Wacoal PR magazine. Her works were seen at Shibuya Tokyu Bunkamura art gallery in June 2012. Ninagawa is a member of the Japan Inter Design Forum as well as an art council board member of the Regional Culture Tax Accountants Fund.

== Feature films ==
- Shogun's Ninja (忍者武芸帖 百地三太夫) (1980)
- Crazy Fruit 狂った果実 (Kurutta kajitsu) (1981)
- Himeyuri Lily Tower (ひめゆりの塔) (1982)
- もどり川 (Madori kawa) (1983)
- V Madonna War a.k.a. Go for Broke (V．マドンナ大戦争) (1985)
- 女狐怪奇伝説 妖女メロン (1987)
- Beyond the Shining Sea (Hakou kirameku hate (1986)
- Green Requiem (グリーン・レクイエム; Guriin rekuiemu) (1988)
- 新・静かなるドン5 (1998)
- 新・静かなるドン6 (1998)
