= Keiko McDonald =

American orientalist

Keiko McDonald (January 1, 1940 – September 14, 2008) was an American orientalist.

== Biography ==
Keiko McDonald was born in Nara, Japan, on January 1, 1940.

In 1963, McDonald graduated from Osaka University of Foreign Studies with a degree in English. She received an MA in English from the State University of California-Sacramento in 1966. Later attending the University of Oregon where she received her Doctor of Arts in 1971 and a PhD in 1974.

After graduation in 1974, McDonald became a visiting assistant professor at the University of Texas-Austin before joining the faculty as an assistant professor at the University of Pittsburgh in 1972 where she taught Japanese cinema, literature, culture and language in the Department of East Asian Languages and Literatures. In 1992, she became a professor and in 2007 served as acting chair. As a scholar of Japanese film, she was renowned internationally and was one of the few who was located in the United States. In 1999, McDonald received the Toshiba International Grant, Tina and David Bellet CAS Undergraduate Teaching Excellence Award in 2002, three Fulbright Research Fellowships and a National Endowment for the Humanities Summer Research Award.

McDonald died on September 14, 2008, while on a sabbatical from teaching when she fell and struck her head fishing.

== Bibliography ==
- Cinema East: a critical study of major Japanese films, 1983
- Reading a Japanese Film: Cinema in Context, 2006. Outstanding Academic Title by Choice magazine.
