= Toshiyuki Nagashima =

Japanese actor

- Born: October 21, 1956 (age 69); Chūō-ku, Chiba, Chiba, Japan
- Occupation: Actor
- Years active: 1977–present

Toshiyuki Nagashima (永島敏行, Nagashima Toshiyuki) is a Japanese actor. He won the award for Best Newcomer at the 3rd Hochi Film Awards for Kaerazaru hibi and for Best Actor at the 6th Hochi Film Awards for Enrai.

== Selected filmography ==
=== Film ===
- Kaerazaru hibi (1978)
- Third Base (1978)
- The Incident (1978)
- The Battle of Port Arthur (1980), Yasusuke Nogi
- Nichiren (1979), Nikkō Shōnin
- Enrai (1981)
- Kofuku (1981)
- Imperial Navy (1981)
- Theater of Life (1983)
- Mishima: A Life in Four Chapters (1985)
- Baby Elephant Story: The Angel Who Descended to Earth (1986)
- Tokei – Adieu l'hiver (1986)
- Godzilla vs. Biollante (1989)
- Manatsu no Chikyū (1991)
- Yearning (1993)
- Nastasja (1994)
- A Last Note (1995)
- Gamera 2: Attack of Legion (1996)
- Godzilla vs. Megaguirus (2000)
- Pyrokinesis (2000)
- Platonic Sex (2001)
- Thway (2003)
- A Sower of Seeds (2012)
- A Sower of Seeds 2 (2015)
- 125 Years Memory (2015), Yutaka Nomura
- A Sower of Seeds 3 (2016)
- Sakura Guardian in the North (2018)
- Threads: Our Tapestry of Love (2020), Shōzō Kirino
- Nobutora (2020), Takeda Shingen and Takeda Nobukado
- Mio's Cookbook (2020)
- Beautiful Lure (2021)
- A Sower of Seeds 4 (2021)
- A Sower of Seeds 5 (2025)
- All That Exists (2027), Tomoya Mimura

=== Television ===
- Shishi no Jidai (1980), Kozo Hiranuma
- Mōri Motonari (1997), Akagawa Motoyasu
- Musashi (2004), Yagyū Toshikatsu
- Fūrin Kazan (2007), Murakami Yoshikiyo
- BG Personal Bodyguard (2018), Shigenobu Imazeki
- Idaten (2019), Chiyosaburō Takeda
- The Grand Family (2021), Ichirō Ōkawa
- Taiga Drama ga Umareta Hi (2023), Mitsuo Yamaoka
- Fixer (2023), the Prime Minister Shigeru Tonomura
