= Lonely Heart (1981 film) =

- Theatrical poster
- Directed by: Kon Ichikawa
- Screenplay by: Shinya Hidaka; Kon Ichikawa; Ikuko Oyabu
- Based on: Lady, Lady I Did It; 1961 novel by Ed McBain
- Produced by: Hitoshi Ogura; Toshio Sakamoto
- Starring: Yutaka Mizutani; Toshiyuki Nagashima; Rie Nakahara
- Cinematography: Kiyoshi Hasegawa
- Edited by: Teruko Tsuchiya
- Music by: Takahiko Ishikawa; Tooru Okada
- Release date: 1981 (Japan)
- Running time: 105 minutes
- Country: Japan
- Language: Japanese

Lonely Heart (Japanese: 幸福, Hepburn: Kōfuku) is a 1981 Japanese mystery film directed by Kon Ichikawa, based upon the 1961 American novel Lady, Lady I Did It in Ed McBain's 87th Precinct series. The film stars Yutaka Mizutani, Toshiyuki Nagashima and Rie Nakahara in a police procedural surrounding murder at a bookstore and the private lives of the cops trying to solve the case.

== Cast ==
- Yutaka Mizutani
- Toshiyuki Nagashima
- Mitsuko Kusabue
- Akiji Kobayashi
- Fujio Tsuneda
- Rie Nakahara
- Noboru Mitani
- Kei Tani
- Jun Hamamura
- Etsuko Ichihara

== Reception ==
The New York Times said the film is moderately successful but the characterizations lack depth and detail.
