= Wahei Tatematsu =

Japanese writer (1947–2010)

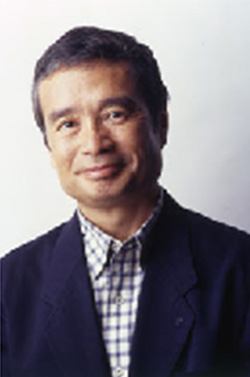
Image of Wahei Tatematsu

Wahei Tatematsu (立松 和平, Tatematsu Wahei; December 15, 1947 – February 8, 2010) was a Japanese novelist. He wrote several novels including Enrai and Dogen-Zenji, about the devout Buddhist who founded the Soto Sect of Zen Buddhism in 1227.

He was also known for his environmental work. In 1995 he founded the Ashio Green Growing Association, a non-profit organization that helps plant trees at the abandoned Ashio Copper Mine.

== Selected works in English ==
- Distant Thunder (Enrai, 遠雷), Charles E. Tuttle (1999). Translated by Lawrence J. Howell and Hikaru Morimoto
- Frozen Dreams: Based on a True Story (Hidaka, 日高), Peter Owen (2012). Translated by Philip Gabriel.
