= Yūsaku Matsuda =

Japanese actor (1949–1989)

- 松田 優作
- Born: September 21, 1949; Shimonoseki, Yamaguchi Prefecture, Japan
- Died: November 6, 1989 (aged 40); Musashino, Tokyo, Japan
- Occupation: Actor
- Years active: 1972–1989
- Spouses: Michiko Kumamoto (m. 1975; div. 1981) Miyuki Kumagai (m. 1983–1989)
- Children: 4, including: Ryuhei Matsuda (son); Shota Matsuda (son)

Yūsaku Matsuda (松田 優作, Matsuda Yūsaku; September 21, 1949 – November 6, 1989) was a Japanese actor. In Japan, he was best known for roles in action films and a variety of television series in the 1970s as well as a switch to a wider range of roles in the 1980s. His final film appearance was as the villain Sato in Ridley Scott's Black Rain. He died in 1989 at the age of 40.

He is considered one of Japan's most important film actors. Several manga, anime and video game characters are based on him, including Kenshiro in Fist of the North Star, Spike Spiegel in Cowboy Bebop, Rikiya Busujima in Zombie Revenge, Aokiji in One Piece, Wabisuke in Summer Wars, and Jubei Yagyu in Onimusha 2.

== Career ==
He began acting after graduating from high school, moving through several theatre companies before joining the Bungakuza theatre group at around the same time as Kaori Momoi. His career as a screen actor started in 1973 with a role as a junior police officer in a TV detective drama called Taiyō ni Hoero! He went on to appear in various television series and action films during the seventies. His most remembered role on television was in Tantei Monogatari, in which he starred as an unlikely private detective. In films, he was known for such gun-toting roles as assassin Shōhei Narumi in the Yūgi (Game) series of films, and master criminal Asakura in Resurrection of the Golden Wolf.

In the 1980s, desiring to be seen as more than an action star, he moved from action films to a wider range of dramatic roles. He made a dramatic weight loss to appear in the film The Beast to Die in 1980. The following year he appeared in another action film, Yokohama BJ Blues, which also featured his singing, and the surreal art film Kagerō-za. In 1983, he won the award for best actor at the 8th Hochi Film Award for Detective Story and The Family Game. In 1985 he took the lead role in the award-winning Sorekara. In 1986, he directed A Homansu, after the scheduled director left due to disagreements. This was the only film he directed. During the eighties, he also appeared in many commercials, such as for Gatsby hair products or Triangle shochu. In addition to acting, from the late seventies to the eighties he toured as a singer, releasing several albums of music.

In 1989, although already diagnosed with cancer, he starred as the villain, Sato, in Black Rain. Director Ridley Scott and co-stars Michael Douglas, Andy Garcia, and Kate Capshaw praised his professionalism and performance, despite his suffering. He died shortly afterwards, after making a final appearance in a special television drama with Florence Griffith-Joyner, in which he was supposed to run against her, but was unable to do so because of his illness.

After his death, his image continued to be used in commercials, such as a 2000 campaign for Schick razors using his image from the Tantei Monogatari television series. Books, films, television specials, and other products, such as scale models of his most famous characters, continue to appear long after his death. In 1998, a film called Yomigaeru Yūsaku: Tantei Monogatari Tokubetsu-hen was released, containing two episodes of the Tantei Monogatari television series and some additional material. In 2009, his second wife, Miyuki Matsuda, produced a tribute film, Soul Red, including clips from his films and interviews with actors such as Andy Garcia, as well as his two sons.

== Personal life ==
Matsuda was born out of wedlock in Shimonoseki, to a Japanese father, a probation officer, whom he never met, and a Zainichi Korean mother, Kaneko Matsuda, originally Kim. She was a Korean who had married a Japanese man who died during World War II. Kaneko wrote his birth year incorrectly as 1950 on his birth records deliberately.

He grew up and was educated in Shimonoseki, attending Kanda elementary school and Bunyo Junior High School, before entering Shimonoseki Secondary School. In 1967, while at high school, at the urging of his mother, he stayed with his aunt in the city of Seaside in America for one year. He attended Seaside High School. However, extremely unhappy in America, malnourished, unable to speak English, and feeling himself the victim of discrimination, he returned to Japan. Because he was afraid of facing his mother, he went to stay with his older brother in Tokyo. He attended Hōnan High School (豊南高等学校) as a night student and graduated in 1969. After graduating, he entered a theatre company called "Rokugatsu Gekijō" (六月劇場), leaving in November 1969. In 1971 he joined a theatre group "Club Marui", then in 1972 he joined "Bungakuza". He met his future wife Michiko through Club Marui in May 1971. At the time he was working as a barman.

He changed his citizenship from Korean to Japanese while he was starring in Taiyō ni Hoero!, with the help of Michiko, whose father was a member of the Liberal Democratic party who was head of the then-Prime Minister's support office.

In 1975 he was involved in two fracases, first with two journalists, and then with a student who attacked him with a wooden kendo sword because the student thought he was assaulting a woman. The student ended up in a hospital, and Matsuda received a suspended sentence for assault. This caused a major disruption in his career, with film studios and television companies dropping him.

He married Michiko Kumamoto in 1975 and had one daughter. They divorced in 1981 after six years of marriage. In 1983, he married Miyuki Kumagai, with whom he had started a relationship in 1979, when she was 17, when she appeared in the television series Tantei Monogatari. They had three children. Two of the children, Ryuhei and Shota, became actors and daughter Yuki became a singer.

== Death ==
In 1988, Matsuda was diagnosed with bladder cancer, before shooting began for Black Rain. Matsuda refused chemotherapy, as he thought it would affect his ability to act in the film. After his death, his first wife, who had experienced him ignoring an ear infection until it required surgery to prevent deafness, wrote that she suspected that he did not actually realize the seriousness of his illness. During the filming, he was urinating blood. By the time shooting finished, in March 1989, his cancer had spread to his spine and lungs, making it inoperable. On October 7, 1989, Matsuda was hospitalized. A month after he was admitted, Matsuda died at 6:45 PM JST on November 6 at the age of 40, at a Tokyo hospital. He was buried in Nishitama cemetery (西多摩霊園) in Akiruno, Tokyo.

== In popular culture ==
A number of manga and anime characters were inspired by Matsuda. Manga author and artist Tetsuo Hara cited Yūsaku Matsuda as one of the two major influences on the character design of Kenshiro, the protagonist of manga and anime series Fist of the North Star. The other major influence was martial artist Bruce Lee, with Hara combining the appearance and character traits of Lee and Matsuda when he came up with the character design of Kenshiro.

In the anime series Cowboy Bebop, protagonist Spike Spiegel's appearance was primarily based on the main protagonist of Tantei Monogatari, portrayed by Matsuda. Spike's voice actor Kōichi Yamadera was a fan of Matsuda, but avoided imitating Matsuda's distinctive manner of speaking, noting that it "wouldn't have sounded right" for Spike. Matsuda also inspired the character Aokiji from the manga series One Piece.

In the video game Onimusha 2: Samurai's Destiny, the hero Jubei Yagyu was modelled after Yūsaku Matsuda.

== Filmography ==
=== Film ===
Year	Title	Role	Notes
1973	Horror of the Wolf (狼の紋章)	Dō Haguro	
1974	Tomodachi (ともだち)	Komatsu	
1974	Ryoma Ansatsu (竜馬暗殺)	Yūta	
1974	Aba yo Dachi kō (あばよダチ公)	Onagi Natsuki	
1976	Hito-goroshi (ひとごろし)	Twin Rokubei	
1976	The Classroom of Terror (暴力教室)	Mizuguchi	
1977	Proof of the Man (人間の証明)	Munesue	
1978	The Most Dangerous Game (最も危険な遊戯)	Shōhei Narumi	
1978	The Killing Game (殺人遊戯)	Shōhei Narumi	
1979	Murder in the Doll House	Toshio Katsu	
1979	Oretachi ni Haka wa Nai	Katsuo Shima	
1979	The Resurrection of the Golden Wolf	Tetsuya Asakura	
1979	The Execution Game (処刑遊戯)	Shōhei Narumi	
1980	Rape Hunter Nerawareta Onna	Insurance Salesman	Uncredited
1980	Bara no Hyōteki	Hotel Guest	
1980	The Beast to Die	Kunihiko Date	
1981	Yokohama BJ Blues	B.J.	
1981	Kagerō-za	Shungo Matsuzaki	
1983	The Family Game	Katsu Yoshimoto	
1983	Detective Story	Shūichi Tsujiyama	
1985	Sorekara	Daisuke Nagai	
1986	A Homansu	Kaze	also director
1988	Wuthering Heights	Onimaru	
1988	A Chaos of Flowers	Takeo Arishima	
1989	Black Rain	Sato Koji	
1998	Yomigaeru Yūsaku: Tantei Monogatari Tokubetsu-hen	Shunsaku Kudō	Posthumous role
2009	Soul Red: Yusaku Matsuda	Himself	Documentary

=== Television ===
Year	Program	Role	Notes
1973	Taiyō ni Hoero!	Jun "Jiipan" Shibata	
1974	Akai Meiro	Jun, Momoe's Uncle	
1975	Oretachi no Kunshō	Yuji Nakano	
1976	Daitokai	Himself, Guest	
1976	Saraba Rōnin	Himself, Guest	
1977–1978	Daitokai Part II	Isao Tokuyoshi	
1978	Daitsuiseki	Himself, Guest (final episode)	
1979–1980	Tantei Monogatari	Shunsaku Kudō	
1982	Haru ga Kita	Unknown	
1982	Shi no Dangai	Unknown	
1982	Shin-Jiken Dr Stop	Unknown	
1982	Home Sweet Home	Himself, Guest	
1982–1983	Anchan	Himself, Guest	
1983	Nettai ya	Unknown	
1983	Dansen	Unknown	
1984	Shin-Yumechiyo Nikki	Unknown	
1984	Onna Goroshi Abura no Jigoku	Unknown	
1986	Ou Otoko	Unknown	
1988	Sakurako wa Warau	Unknown	
1989	Kareinaru Tsuiseki	Unknown	With Florence Griffith-Joyner

=== Video games ===
Year	Film	Role	Notes
2002	Onimusha 2: Samurai's Destiny	Jūbei Yagyū	Matsuda's likeness was used for that of the lead character.
