= Yoshimitsu Morita =

Film director (1950–2011)

- Born: 25 January 1950; Chigasaki, Kanagawa, Japan
- Died: 20 December 2011 (aged 61); Tokyo, Japan
- Occupation: Film director
- Years active: 1981–2011
- Spouse: Misao Morita
- Awards: Best Director, Japanese Academy Awards 2004

Yoshimitsu Morita (森田 芳光, Morita Yoshimitsu; 25 January 1950 – 20 December 2011) was a Japanese film director. He was known for his versatility, having directed satires, melodramas, crime thrillers, and pinku films. His most acclaimed films include The Family Game (1983), Sorekara (1985), Haru (1996), and Lost Paradise (1997).

== Career ==
Self-taught, first making shorts on 8 mm film during the 1970s, he made his feature film debut with No Yōna Mono (Something Like It, 1981).

In 1983 he won acclaim for his movie Kazoku Gēmu (The Family Game), which was voted the best film of the year by Japanese critics in the Kinema Junpo magazine poll. The magazine went on to vote it as the best Japanese film of the 1980s (in 2018) and as the 10th best Japanese film of all time (in 2009). This black comedy dealt with then-recent changes in the structure of Japanese home life. It also earned Morita the Directors Guild of Japan New Directors Award.

The director has been nominated for eight Japanese Academy Awards, winning the 2004 Best Director award for Ashura no Gotoku (Like Asura, 2003). He also won the award for best director at the 21st Yokohama Film Festival for 39 keihō dai sanjūkyū jō (Keiho, 2003) and the award for best screenplay at the 18th Yokohama Film Festival for Haru (1996). His 2007 film Sanjuro is a remake of the Kurosawa film.

== Themes ==
According to film critic Saburō Kawamoto in 1985, Morita's early features presented a new cinema and sensibility that represented "the new human species" of postmodern Japan. Morita's aesthetic was minimalistic, transparent, and featured empty landscapes with light and abstract characters. This was in direct contrast to the youth films of 1960s and 1970s in which the directors would aim for a fullness of sensuality, emotion, and physicality.

== Death and legacy ==
Yoshimitsu Morita died from acute liver failure in Tokyo in December 2011. His last film Bokutachi kyūkō: A ressha de ikō (Take the "A" Train, 2011), a romantic comedy about two male train enthusiasts, was released in Japan in March 2012.

== Filmography ==
- No Yōna Mono (1981) (Something Like It)
- Come On Girls! (Shibugakitai Boys & Girls, 1982)
- Zūmu Appu: Maruhon Uwasa no Sutorippa (also known as Uwasa no Stripper, 1982)
- Futoku Aishite Fukaku Aishite (Pink Cut, 1983)
- Kazoku Gēmu (The Family Game, 1983)
- Tokimeki ni Shisu (1984)
- Mein tēma (Main Theme, 1984)
- Sorekara (And Then, 1985)
- Sorobanzuku (1986)
- Kanashi Iro Yanen (1988)
- Ai to Heisei no Iro - Otoko (1989)
- Kitchen (1989)
- Oishii Kekkon (Happy Wedding) (1991)
- Mirai no Omoide (Future Memories: Last Christmas, 1992)
- Haru (1996)
- Shitsurakuen (A Lost Paradise, 1997)
- 39 Keihō dai Sanjūkyū jō (Keiho, 1999)
- Kuroi Ie (The Black House, 1999)
- Mohou-han (Copycat Killer, 2002)
- Ashura no Gotoku (Like Asura, 2003)
- Umineko (The Seagull, 2004)
- Mamiya kyodai (The Mamiya Brothers, 2006)
- Sanjuro (2007)
- Southbound (2007)
- Bushi no kakeibo (Abacus and Sword, 2010)
- Watashi dasu wa (It's on Me, 2009)
- Bokutachi kyūkō: A ressha de ikō (Take the "A" Train, 2012)
