= Yokohama Film Festival =

Japanese film awards ceremony

- Location: Yokohama, Japan
- Founded: 1980
- Website: yokohama-eigasai.o.oo7.jp

The Yokohama Film Festival (ヨコハマ映画祭, Yokohama eigasai) is an annual awards ceremony held in Yokohama, Japan. Ten films are chosen as the best of the year, and various awards are given to personnel. The first festival, held on February 3, 1980, was a small affair by fans and film critics. In 1994, France announced plans to help sponsor the festival with grants from the National Cinema Center.

== Ceremonies ==
1st: 1980	2nd: 1981	3rd: 1982	4th: 1983	5th: 1984	6th: 1985	7th: 1986	8th: 1987	9th: 1988	10th: 1989
11th: 1990	12th: 1991	13th: 1992	14th: 1993	15th: 1994	16th: 1995	17th: 1996	18th: 1997	19th: 1998	20th: 1999
21st: 2000	22nd: 2001	23rd: 2002	24th: 2003	25th: 2004	26th: 2005	27th: 2006	28th: 2007	29th: 2008	30th: 2009
31st: 2010	32nd: 2011	33rd: 2012	34th: 2013	35th: 2014	36th: 2015	37th: 2016	38th: 2017	39th: 2018	40th: 2019
41st: 2020	42nd: 2021	43rd: 2022	44th: 2023	45th: 2024	46th: 2025	47th: 2026			

== Categories ==
- Best Film
- Best Actor
- Best Actress
- Best Supporting Actor
- Best Supporting Actress
- Best Director
- Best New Director
- Best Screenplay
- Best Cinematographer
- Best Newcomer
- Special Jury Prize
- Best New Actor
- Best New Actress
