= Scarlet (2025 film) =

Anime film by Mamoru Hosoda

- Theatrical release poster

Japanese name
- Kanji: 果てしなきスカーレット
- Literal meaning: Endless Scarlet
Transcriptions
- Revised Hepburn: Hateshinaki Sukāretto
- Directed by: Mamoru Hosoda
- Screenplay by: Mamoru Hosoda
- Produced by: Nozomu Takahashi; Yuichiro Saito; Toshimi Tanio
- Starring: Mana Ashida; Masaki Okada; Koji Yakusho
- Edited by: Shigeru Nishiyama
- Music by: Taisei Iwasaki
- Production company: Studio Chizu
- Distributed by: Toho; Sony Pictures Entertainment (Note: Released under the Columbia Pictures label, Sony Pictures Releasing International distributes worldwide through Columbia, excluding the United States and Canada, where Sony Pictures Classics handles distribution.)
- Release dates: September 4, 2025 (Venice); November 21, 2025 (Japan)
- Running time: 111 minutes
- Country: Japan
- Language: Japanese
- Box office: $2 million

Scarlet (Japanese: 果てしなきスカーレット, Hepburn: Hateshinaki Sukāretto; lit. 'Endless Scarlet') is a 2025 Japanese animated fantasy action film written and directed by Mamoru Hosoda and produced by Studio Chizu. Inspired by the Shakespearean tragedy Hamlet, the film follows the eponymous princess who can cross time and space on a quest of vengeance after her father is murdered.

Scarlet had its premiere out of competition at the 82nd Venice International Film Festival on September 4, 2025, and was released theatrically in Japan on November 21, 2025, co-distributed by Toho and Sony Pictures through the latter's Columbia Pictures label.

== Plot ==
In 16th century Denmark, King Amleth is accused of treason and sentenced to execution by his envious brother Claudius. Amleth's daughter, Princess Scarlet, fails to hear her father's last words and sees his corpse, leaving her traumatized. While Scarlet grows up and trains to fight her uncle, Claudius is crowned king, but reigns with terror and oppression. Scarlet confronts her uncle at a ball in attempt to kill Claudius, but ends up collapsing after she seemingly consumed the poisoned wine intended for Claudius. As she loses consciousness, she vows to avenge her father.

Scarlet awakens in the underworld, where the living and dead co-exist. An old woman informs her that Amleth has turned to nothingness, but Claudius is present in the underworld and seeks to enter the Infinite Land, where the dead can continue to exist. As she dispatches knights sent by Claudius to capture her, Scarlet encounters Hijiri, a paramedic from 21st century Japan, and Cornelius, one of Amleth's assassins, who bests her in their fight. After she wounds Cornelius with help from Hijiri, who uses a whistling arrow to distract Cornelius, Scarlet learns that Claudius is close to the Infinite Land. Bent on revenge, Scarlet sets off to find her uncle, now accompanied by Hijiri.

Scarlet and Hijiri come across a caravan of elderly souls attacked by bandits. Hijiri begs for the bandits to stop, but the fighting continues to escalate until the leader is killed by a massive lightning strike by a enormous dragon that oversees the underworld. As Scarlet and Hijiri continue their journey, they are attacked by Voltimand, another of Amleth's killers. As Hijiri tries to beseech Voltimand and his men to cease fighting, the dragon returns and forces Voltimand's forces to take cover. Voltemand tries to shoot Hijiri for interfering in his mission, Scarlet gets shot protecting Hijiri as he treats her wound while Voltemand gets spooked by the dragon's distant lightning when he attempts again.

After the dragon passes, Scarlet confronts Voltimand, who begs for mercy and reveals Amleth's last word: "Forgive", which Scarlet does not understand as she spares Voltemand. Meanwhile at his castle within the underworld, Claudius amasses an enormous army that he promises will join him in the Infinite Land. Upon learning that Cornelius and Voltemand failed to capture Scarlet, he enlists Polonius, Laertes, Guildenstern, and Rosencrantz to locate and kill her. After she and Hijiri part ways with Voltemand and his forces, Scarlet later experiences a nightmare about her getting sealed in her father's empty coffin as well as a vision where a modern era version of herself dances with Hijiri in the streets of Tokyo. The following day, Scarlet and Hijiri meet an army of civilians opposed to Claudius who are preparing to storm Claudius' castle.

During the battle and ascent up the mountain, a young civilian girl, whom Scarlet met before the battle, is taken hostage by Guildenstern to force Scarlet to appear, leading to her capture. Traumatically remembering his death by an murderous sociopath while protecting a group of children from getting killed back in the modern era, Hijiri kills both Guildenstern and Rosencrantz and manages to save Scarlet, but is wounded in the process. While the civilians arrive at the castle only to discover Claudius is nowhere to be found, Scarlet and Hijiri reach the top of the mountain in search of the stairway to the Infinite Land, but are attacked by Polonius and Laertes. Cornelius and Voltimand arrive to aid Scarlet in finishing them off as payback for their earlier mistreatment, before they then inform them that Claudius has taken a celestial stairway up to the Infinite Land, which Scarlet then ascends.

As Scarlet reaches the gate, she finds Claudius, who has been barred from the Infinite Land due to the sins he committed and repents for forgiveness. Believing her father needed her to forgive Claudius, Scarlet implores him once more to ask for forgiveness for killing Amleth, but Claudius spitefully rejects her as he reveals his only regret was not torturing Amleth before his execution and expresses greed as his earlier promises to bring his army with him are false. Enraged, Scarlet attempts to kill Claudius as she berates his irredeemable nature, but then hears Amleth's pleas to forgive, to abandon her desire for revenge, and to live happily without him as she meets with his spirit one last time while coming to the realization that her father actually wanted her to forgive herself. Scarlet solemnly tells her uncle that while she can't forgive him, she will no longer pursue revenge and instead seek to lead a war-free world. Ignoring Scarlet's ideals, Claudius makes his final attempt to kill her, but the dragon returns, obliterating and disintegrating him with its lightning before transforming into a mass of birds that disperse as Claudius perishes.

Reunited with Hijiri, Scarlet tells him that she can now die in peace. However, Hijiri informs her that she is still alive, while he refused to accept that he had been murdered in his time. The old woman returns and reveals that she can only send one soul back to the living. Although Scarlet advocates for Hijiri to live again, he reveals he had been fatally wounded by Rosencrantz. As Hijiri slowly succumbs to his wound, the old woman refuses Scarlet's plea to let her take Hijiri's place in death. Scarlet tearfully tells Hijiri that she would rather be dead due to her obsession with revenge, but he demands that Scarlet live her life, to which she tearfully accepts. Scarlet gives Hijiri a last kiss as he disintegrates, before she returns to the living.

Back in Denmark, Scarlet awakens from a coma thanks to an antidote given by her caretakers. She discovers that Claudius died from drinking the same poisoned wine that Scarlet had accidentally consumed, while Scarlet's unfaithful mother and queen Gertrude is left grief-stricken for his death and furious at her daughter for her survival. Scarlet becomes the new Queen of Denmark, telling her people that she will create a war-free world with a future full of love and harmony; her people cheer and support her. The film ends with Scarlet looking into the sky, smiling.

== Voice cast ==
Character	Japanese	English
Scarlet	Mana Ashida	Erin Yvette
Hijiri	Masaki Okada	Chris Hackney; Aaron Encinas (singing voice)
Claudius	Koji Yakusho	David Kaye
Voltemand	Kōtarō Yoshida	Jamieson K. Price
Cornelius	Yutaka Matsushige	Fred Tatasciore
Polonius	Kazuhiro Yamaji	Jason Marnocha
Laertes	Tokio Emoto	Yuri Lowenthal
Rosencrantz	Munetaka Aoki	Ian Cardoni
Guildenstern	Shota Sometani	Michael Yurchak
Gertrude	Yuki Saito	Michelle Wong
Amleth	Masachika Ichimura	Fred Tatasciore
Old woman	Kayoko Shiraishi	Juanita Jennings
Girl	Noa Shiroyama	Aaliyah Sun Huang

== Production ==
Mamoru Hosoda, the film's writer and director, stated that Scarlet would not use 2D animation nor "Hollywood-style CG", instead aiming for a different look. The film took four and a half years to produce, longer than Hosoda's previous films, due to incorporated digital techniques for a more detailed aesthetic, including facial expressions that are uncommon in anime. Hosoda stated: "The detail on a lot of the characters and models is something that would be extremely challenging to do with 2D, if not impossible." Action scenes featured the work of Baby Assassin's action director and stunt coordinator Kensuke Sonomura, as well as actress and stunt performer Saori Izawa, whose action movements served as a major reference for the character of Scarlet. Studio Chizu produced the animation with the company also co-producing alongside Sony Pictures, and Nippon Television. Yuichiro Saito, Toshimi Tanio, and Nozomu Takahashi are credited as producers.

== Release ==
The film's distribution is handled by Toho and Sony Pictures Entertainment Japan via Columbia Pictures; Sony Pictures Classics distributes for North America, while the film was released through Sony Pictures Releasing International for the remaining territories. Originally, Toho was set to only distribute in Japan, while Sony would distribute internationally under Columbia Pictures, before North American rights were transferred to Sony Pictures Classics.

The film was released in Japanese theatres via Toho and Sony Pictures Entertainment Japan on November 21, 2025. Initially planned to release the film in North America three weeks after on December 12, Scarlet was given an awards-qualifying run later that year, followed by a 1-week IMAX run on February 6, 2026, before finally expanding wide on February 13. The film was released in Asia on December 10th, while the United Kingdom release was pushed back to February 6, 2026, and then again on 13th March, 2026, which faced competition from the same distributor handling Project Hail Mary on 19 March, 2026.

=== Home media ===
Scarlet was released for purchase and rent on digital streaming on March 17, 2026, and on Blu-ray, Ultra HD Blu-ray, and DVD on May 19 for North America via Sony Pictures Home Entertainment and retrospectively for Japan via VAP on May 27, 2026.

== Reception ==
On the review aggregator website Rotten Tomatoes, 72% of 85 critics' reviews are positive, with an average rating of 6.3/10. The website's consensus reads: "Scarlet is a narratively ambitious take on Hamlet that delivers awe-inspiring fantasy, wondrous animation, and an unforgettable atmosphere" Metacritic, which uses a weighted average, assigned the film a score of 56 out of 100, based on 20 critics, indicating "mixed or average" reviews.

Matthew Joseph Jenner from International Cinephile Society described the film as "not only a strong narrative work, but an accomplished visual and aural achievement", and noted "this is a film that will become more rewarding through multiple viewings". IndieWire's film critic Adam Solomons referred to the film as a "visually impressive but narratively forgettable baroque fantasy".

Critics and Shakespeare scholars also discussed the film as an adaptation of Hamlet. Writing for Sight and Sound, Blake Simons described Scarlet as a gender-swapped take on Hamlet that uses the play as a basis for exploring revenge and forgiveness. Shakespeare scholar Shoichirō Kawai, who provided research cooperation for the film, discussed its use of specific scenes and lines from Shakespeare. Sae Kitamura, another Shakespeare scholar, also discussed the film's relationship to Hamlet, including its political dimension and afterlife imagery.

=== Accolades ===
Award / Festival	Date of ceremony	Category	Recipient(s)	Result	Ref.
Annie Awards	February 21, 2026	Best Feature – Independent	Scarlet	Nominated	
Annie Awards	February 21, 2026	Best Direction – Feature	Mamoru Hosoda	Nominated	
Annie Awards	February 21, 2026	Best Writing – Feature	Mamoru Hosoda	Nominated	
Crunchyroll Anime Awards	May 23, 2026	Film of the Year	Scarlet	Nominated	
Georgia Film Critics Association	December 27, 2025	Best Animated Film	Scarlet	Nominated	
Hochi Film Awards	December 2, 2025	Best Animated Picture	Scarlet	Nominated	
Manga Barcelona Awards	December 5, 2026	Best Anime Movie Premiere	Scarlet	Pending	
New York Film Critics Online	December 15, 2025	Best Animation	Scarlet	Nominated	
Venice International Film Festival	September 6, 2025	Fanheart3 Award – Nave d'Argento for Best OTP	Scarlet/Hijri	Won	
Women Film Critics Circle	December 21, 2025	Best Animated Female	Scarlet	Nominated	
