= Rusty Rabbit =

2025 video game

- Promotional artwork starring the game's main protagonist Stamp
- Developer: Nitroplus
- Publisher: NetEase
- Producer: Yuichiro Saito
- Writer: Gen Urobuchi
- Engine: Unreal Engine
- Platforms: Windows; PlayStation 5; Nintendo Switch
- Release: April 17, 2025
- Genres: Platformer, metroidvania
- Mode: Single player

Rusty Rabbit is a metroidvania action platforming video game developed by Nitroplus and published by NetEase. It was released on April 17, 2025, for Windows, PlayStation 5 and Nintendo Switch.

== Synopsis ==
The game takes place in a post-apocalyptic world where humans have long abandoned Earth, leaving it to rabbits, who have developed a civilization where the books of Peter Rabbit are seen as holy. The game follows rabbit Benjamin "Rusty" Stamp (voiced by Takaya Kuroda in Japanese and Yong Yea in English), who sets on a journey to save his daughter in Smokestack Mountain.

== Gameplay ==
Rusty Rabbit is a 2.5D Metroidvania. While Stamp's only weapon is a drill at first, he discovers new ones as the game progresses. His abilities can be upgraded by collecting junk and bringing it to his village.

In addition to the story dungeons, the game also has optional procedurally generated dungeons.

== Development and release ==
The game was written by Gen Urobuchi and produced by Yuichiro Saito. Urobuchi was inspired by a picture on Twitter of a Sylvanian Families doll in a mecha. He had developed the game as a passion project during the COVID-19 lockdown and later fleshed it out as a full game. The game was developed by Nitroplus and uses the Unreal Engine. A teaser trailer was shown in the 2023 Tokyo Game Show.

In June 2024, NetEase originally announced for a September 24 launch on Windows and PlayStation 5. However, in late August the same year, the game was delayed to 2025 to "provide the best possible release" and that the addition of a Switch port was also in the works. In January 2025, the companies revealed that the game would be released on April 17. However, the voiceovers will only be in Japanese upon release, whilst the English voiceover option will be released two weeks later on May 1.

== Reception ==
Reception

Aggregate scores
Aggregator	Score
Metacritic	(PS5) 70/100 (PC) 59/100 (NS) 73/100
OpenCritic	46% recommend

Review score
Publication	Score
Famitsu	8/10, 9/10, 8/10, 8/10

The PlayStation 5, PC, and Nintendo Switch versions of Rusty Rabbit all received "mixed or average" reviews from critics, according to the review aggregation website Metacritic. Fellow review aggregator OpenCritic assessed that the game received fair approval, being recommended by 46% of critics. In Japan, four critics from Famitsu gave the game a total score of 33 out of 40.
