= Summer Wars =

2009 Japanese animated film

- Theatrical release poster

Japanese name
- Kanji: サマーウォーズ
Transcriptions
- Revised Hepburn: Samā Wōzu
- Directed by: Mamoru Hosoda
- Screenplay by: Satoko Okudera
- Story by: Mamoru Hosoda
- Produced by: Nozomu Takahashi; Takuya Ito; Takafumi Watanabe; Yuichiro Saito
- Starring: Ryunosuke Kamiki; Nanami Sakuraba; Mitsuki Tanimura; Sumiko Fuji
- Cinematography: Yukihiro Matsumoto
- Edited by: Shigeru Nishiyama
- Music by: Akihiko Matsumoto
- Production company: Madhouse
- Distributed by: Warner Bros. Pictures
- Release date: August 1, 2009
- Running time: 114 minutes
- Country: Japan
- Language: Japanese
- Box office: US$18.7 million

Summer Wars (Japanese: サマーウォーズ, Hepburn: Samā Wōzu) is a 2009 Japanese animated science fiction film directed by Mamoru Hosoda, produced by Madhouse, and distributed by Warner Bros. Pictures. The film's voice cast includes Ryunosuke Kamiki, Nanami Sakuraba, Mitsuki Tanimura, Sumiko Fuji, and Ayumu Saitō. Set in 2010, Summer Wars tells the story of Kenji Koiso, a timid eleventh-grade math genius who is taken to Ueda by twelfth-grade student Natsuki Shinohara to celebrate her great-grandmother's 90th birthday. However, he is falsely implicated in the hacking of a virtual world by a self-aware, sadistic Artificial Intelligence named Love Machine. Kenji must repair the damage done, and find a way to stop the rogue computer program from causing any further chaos.

After producing The Girl Who Leapt Through Time, Madhouse was asked to produce something new. Hosoda and writer Satoko Okudera created a story about a social network and a stranger's connection with strange family. The real-life city of Ueda was chosen as the setting for Summer Wars as part of the territory was once governed by the Sanada clan and was close to Hosoda's birthplace in Toyama. Hosoda used the clan as the basis for the Jinnouchi family after visiting his then-fiancée's home in Ueda.

Production of Summer Wars commenced in 2006. Art director Youji Takeshige incorporated Japanese houses into his background designs. Hosoda also insisted that 80 family members were to be included as main characters. The project was first announced at the 2008 Tokyo International Anime Fair and the first trailer of the film was released in April 2009. Audience interest was fueled primarily through word of mouth and Internet publicity. A manga adaptation of the film was written by Iqura Sugimoto and began its serialization in July 2009.

Summer Wars premiered in Japan on August 1, 2009. It grossed over US$1 million in its opening weekend in 127 theaters and ranked No. 7 at the box office. The film was well received by critics and the general audience and was financially successful, earning $18 million worldwide. It won several awards such as the 2010 Japan Academy Prize for Animation of the Year, the 2010 Japan Media Arts Festival's Animation Division Grand Prize, the Anaheim International Film Festival's Audience Award for Best Animated Feature and was nominated for the 2009 Golden Leopard award at the Locarno International Film Festival.

== Plot ==
In 2010, Kenji Koiso is a young student at Kuonji High School with a gift for mathematics and a part-time moderator in the massive computer-simulated virtual reality world OZ along with his friend Takashi Sakuma.

One day, Kenji is invited by fellow Kuonji student Natsuki Shinohara to participate in her great-grandmother Sakae Jinnouchi's 90th birthday. After traveling to Sakae's estate in Ueda, Nagano, Natsuki introduces Kenji as her fiancé to Sakae, surprising them both. Kenji meets several of Natsuki's relatives and discovers that the Jinnouchis are descendants of a samurai (vassal of the Takeda clan) who challenged the Tokugawa clan in 1615. He also meets Wabisuke Jinnouchi, Natsuki's half-great-uncle and a software engineer who has been living in the United States since stealing the family fortune 10 years ago.

Kenji receives an e-mail with a mathematical code and cracks it. However, a program called Love Machine uses Kenji's solution to hijack his avatar and hack into OZ's system. Kenji, Sakuma, and Natsuki's cousin Kazuma Ikezawa confront Love Machine, but it defeats Kazuma's avatar King Kazma and continues absorbing the system's accounts, causing catastrophic traffic congestion and disabling electrical devices. Two of Sakae's relatives, Rika and Shota Jinnouchi, deduce Kenji's involvement. Shota arrests Kenji, but the congestion causes Natsuki to return them to the estate.

Sakae calls associates in important positions in Japanese society and relatives who work in emergency services, encouraging them to work their hardest to reduce chaos and damage, comparing the situation to war. Kenji returns control of the system to the moderators and engineers while Sakuma discovers that Kenji actually misspelled one part of the code. Wabisuke reveals that he developed the program and sold it to the United States Armed Forces for a test run and expanding it into a powerful virtual intelligence. Sakae later encourages Kenji to take care of Natsuki during a Koi-Koi match.

The next morning, Kenji and the Jinnouchis find Sakae dead. Her youngest son Mansaku explains that she had angina, and that Love Machine had deactivated her heart monitor. Kenji, Sakuma, and most of the Jinnouchis form a plan to defeat Love Machine with a supercomputer using ice blocks as a coolant, while Natsuki and the others prepare a funeral for Sakae.

Kenji, along with Sakuma and the others, capture Love Machine, but Shota carries the ice blocks to Sakae's body, overheating the supercomputer. Love Machine absorbs King Kazma and redirects the Arawashi Asteroid Probe onto a collision course with a nuclear power plant. Meanwhile, Natsuki discovers a will left by Sakae and reunites with Kenji and the rest of the group. Natsuki has Wabisuke return home before the family reads Sakae's will, asking them to reconcile with Wabisuke. Realizing that Love Machine sees everything as a game, Kenji has the Jinnouchis confront Love Machine to play Hanafuda Koi-Koi in OZ's casino world, wagering their accounts. Natsuki wins several rounds, but gets distracted and nearly loses her "winnings".

However, OZ users worldwide enter their own accounts into the wager on Natsuki's side, prompting the system's guardian programs—the blue and red whales known as John and Yoko—to upgrade Natsuki's account. Natsuki wagers what the 150 million avatars had given to her in a single hand and critically injures Love Machine, prompting it to redirect the Arawashi towards Sakae's estate. Kenji repeatedly tries breaking into the probe's GPS, while Wabisuke disables Love Machine's defenses. After being revived and assisted by several of the Jinnouchis' avatars, King Kazma destroys Love Machine. Kenji infiltrates the GPS to redirect the Arawashi away from the estate, destroying the estate's entrance and causing a geyser to erupt. As the Jinnouchis celebrate their victory as well as Sakae's birthday, they have Natsuki kiss Kenji after they confess their love to each other.

== Voice cast ==
Character	Japanese	English
Kenji Koiso (小磯 健二, Koiso Kenji)	Ryunosuke Kamiki	Michael Sinterniklaas
A teenager and a moderator of the interactive computer world OZ along with his close friend Takashi Sakuma. Kenji is less skilled in dealing with people. Kenji is invited by his friend Natsuki Shinohara for Sakae Jinnouchi's 90th birthday. After receiving a cryptic code on his cell phone and cracking it, he becomes a primary suspect for hacking into OZ.
Natsuki Shinohara (篠原 夏希, Shinohara Natsuki)	Nanami Sakuraba	Brina Palencia
A spirited young woman and a close friend of Kenji Koiso. She hires Kenji to meet her large extended family for her great-grandmother Sakae Jinnouchi's 90th birthday.
Kazuma Ikezawa (池沢 佳主馬, Ikezawa Kazuma)	Mitsuki Tanimura	Maxey Whitehead
A second cousin of Natsuki Shinohara. His avatar is King Kazma, a renowned program in OZ. Kazuma is also a hikikomori who seldom leaves his room and uses his talents to win every game in OZ. When he is not in his room he trains in Shorinji Kempo with his grandfather, Mansuke Jinnouchi.
Sakae Jinnouchi (陣内 栄, Jinnouchi Sakae)	Sumiko Fuji	Pam Dougherty
The 89-year-old great-grandmother of Natsuki Shinohara and indomitable head of the Jinnouchi family. Despite her advanced age she holds the family together. She also has connections in the highest ranks of political and financial circles.
Wabisuke Jinnouchi (陣内 侘助, Jinnouchi Wabisuke)	Ayumu Saito	J. Michael Tatum
A handsome and sardonic 41-year-old computer expert, a professor at Carnegie Mellon University, and the half-granduncle of Natsuki Shinohara. Naomi Miwa refers to him as Natsuki's "first love." He is the illegitimate son of Natsuki's great-grandfather, Tokue. He was adopted by Sakae Jinnouchi, whom Wabisuke cares for deeply.
Takashi Sakuma (佐久間 敬, Sakuma Takashi)	Takahiro Yokokawa	Todd Haberkorn
A 17-year-old fellow moderator of OZ and close friend of Kenji Koiso.
Yukiko Shinohara (篠原 雪子, Shinohara Yukiko)	Kiyomi Tanigawa	Anastasia Muñoz
The 47-year-old mother of Natsuki Shinohara.
Kazuo Shinohara (篠原 和雄, Shinohara Kazuo)	Mutsumi Sasaki	Bill Jenkins
The 55-year-old father of Natsuki Shinohara. Kazuo works as a member of Tokyo's water department.
Mariko Jinnouchi (陣内 万理子, Jinnouchi Mariko)	Mieko Nobusawa	Shelley Calene-Black
The 71-year-old daughter of Sakae Jinnouchi who works as a housewife.
Riichi Jinnouchi (陣内 理一, Jinnouchi Riichi)	Takuya Kirimoto	Chuck Huber
The 41-year-old son of Mariko Jinnouchi. Riichi is a member of the Japan Ground Self-Defense Force and is stationed in Camp Ichigaya.
Rika Jinnouchi (陣内 理香, Jinnouchi Rika)	Sakiko Tamagawa	Cynthia Cranz
The 42-year-old daughter of Mariko Jinnouchi. She works as an agent of the city's government.
Mansuke Jinnouchi (陣内 万助, Jinnouchi Mansuke)	Ichirō Nagai	John Swasey
The 70-year-old middle son of Sakae Jinnouchi. Mansuke is an owner of a local fish market. Along with his grandson Kazuma Ikezawa, he trains in Shorinji Kempo.
Tasuke Jinnouchi (陣内 太助, Jinnouchi Tasuke)	Takashi Kobayashi	John Burgmeier
The 45-year-old son of Mansuke Jinnouchi. Tasuke works as a shopkeeper of an electronics store.
Shota Jinnouchi (陣内 翔太, Jinnouchi Shōta)	Yutaka Shimizu	Mike McFarland
The 21-year-old son of Tasuke Jinnouchi. Shota is a police officer who is extremely protective of Natsuki Shinohara.
Naomi Miwa (三輪 直美, Miwa Naomi)	Kaori Yamagata	Lydia Mackay
The 42-year-old eldest daughter of Mansuke Jinnouchi who is divorced.
Kiyomi Ikezawa (池沢 聖美, Ikezawa Kiyomi)	Tagame Tamura	Jennifer Seman
The 39-year-old youngest daughter of Mansuke Jinnouchi and mother of Kazuma Ikezawa. Kiyomi is a care worker based in Nagoya. Throughout the film, she is pregnant with Kazuma's sister.
Mansaku Jinnouchi (陣内 万作, Jinnouchi Mansaku)	Tadashi Nakamura	Barry Yandell
The 68-year-old youngest son of Sakae Jinnouchi. Mansaku monitors Sakae's health problems.
Yorihiko Jinnouchi (陣内 頼彦, Jinnouchi Yorihiko)	Yoji Tanaka	Robert McCollum
The 45-year-old eldest son of Mansaku Jinnouchi. Yorihiko works as an EMT in Matsumoto's fire department.
Kunihiko Jinnouchi (陣内 邦彦, Jinnouchi Kunihiko)	Hashiya Nakamura	Patrick Seitz
The 42-year-old middle son of Mansaku Jinnouchi. Kunihiko works as a fire sergeant in Suwa's fire department.
Katsuhiko Jinnouchi (陣内 克彦, Jinnouchi Katsuhiko)	Mitsutaka Itakura	Christopher Sabat
The 40-year-old youngest son of Mansaku Jinnouchi. Katsuhiko is a firefighter who is a member of Ueda's fire department and assists in the department's rescue squad.
Noriko Jinnouchi (陣内 典子, Jinnouchi Noriko)	Eiko Kanazawa	Colleen Clinkenbeard
The 37-year-old wife of Yorihiko Jinnouchi.
Nana Jinnouchi (陣内 奈々, Jinnouchi Nana)	Chigusa Takaku	Caitlin Glass
The 32-year-old wife of Kunihiko Jinnouchi.
Yumi Jinnouchi (陣内 由美, Jinnouchi Yumi)	Riisa Naka	Monica Rial
The 38-year-old wife of Katsuhiko Jinnouchi. She is a fanatic when it comes to watching her son Ryouhei play baseball.
Ryohei Jinnouchi (陣内 了平, Jinnouchi Ryōhei)	Naoto Adachi	Jason Liebrecht
The 17-year-old eldest son of Katsuhiko Jinnouchi. Ryohei plays in his local high school's baseball team.
Yuhei Jinnouchi (陣内 祐平, Jinnouchi Yūhei)	Rikito Ota	Brittney Karbowski
The 7-year-old middle son of Katsuhiko Jinnouchi.
Shingo Jinnouchi (陣内 真悟, Jinnouchi Shingo)	Yuki Imai	Alison Viktorin
The 6-year-old son of Yorihiko Jinnouchi.
Mao Jinnouchi (陣内 真緒, Jinnouchi Mao)	Sumire Morohoshi	Cherami Leigh
The 9-year-old daughter of Yorihiko Jinnouchi.
Kana Jinnouchi (陣内 加奈, Jinnouchi Kana)	Hinano Minagawa	Tia Ballard
The 2-year-old daughter of Kunihiko Jinnouchi.

== Production ==
=== Development ===
Following the critical and commercial success of The Girl Who Leapt Through Time, Madhouse was offered to produce a second film. Whereas Madhouse based the previous film on a novel, the studio was given the chance to create the next film. Mamoru Hosoda, the director of The Girl Who Leapt Through Time, selected a story for both people with family and those without having a family. Production of Summer Wars commenced in 2006.

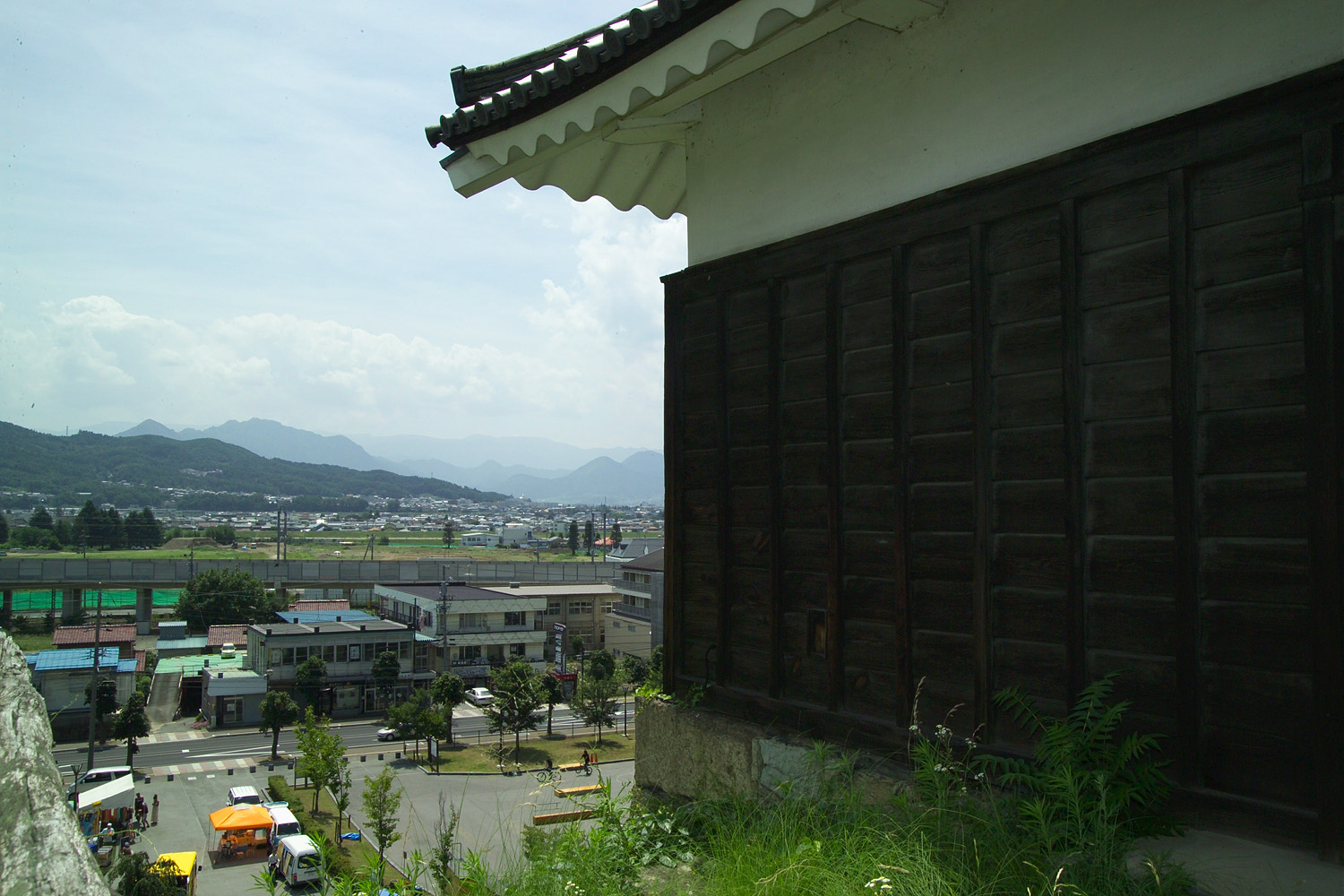
The city of Ueda viewed from the west turret of Ueda Castle. Ueda was used as the setting for most of the film.

Most of the film is set in the real-life city of Ueda. Ueda was chosen as the primary setting of the film because it is located in a territory formerly governed by the prominent Sanada clan, upon which the Jinnouchi family is based. Ueda is also close to Hosoda's birthplace in Toyama. Hosoda's inspiration for the name of the social network OZ came from a large supermarket that he once visited while still working for Toei Animation at the time. Although noting similarities between OZ and Second Life, Hosoda also cited the Japanese social networking website mixi as a primary influence because of his experiences. For the color and design of OZ, he cited Nintendo games as inspiration. The design aesthetic was compared by some reviewers to the work of Takashi Murakami. Hosoda said that he admires the artwork of Murakami, but designed the social network as a "clean, uncluttered look." During production, Hosoda visited his then-fiancée's house in Ueda, and experienced the history of her family's life. Hosoda cited his influence of using a family as the basis of the film from his marriage and from attending several film festivals.

In addition to Hosoda, the team included writer Satoko Okudera and character designer Yoshiyuki Sadamoto, who previously worked with Hosoda on The Girl Who Leapt Through Time. Hiroyuki Aoyama served as an animation director, while action animation direction was handled by Tatsuzo Nishida. During production, Sadamoto based Wabisuke's design on those of actor Yūsaku Matsuda. Aoyama was responsible for supervising the animation of the real world scenes, while Nishida supervised the animation for the digital world, using both traditional animation and computer animation techniques. Digital animation studio Digital Frontier was responsible for creating the visuals of OZ and its avatars. Youji Takeshige oversaw the art direction for Summer Wars. While visiting Ueda, Hosoda thought that Takeshige, who has previously worked with Studio Ghibli, should draw traditional Japanese houses for the film. The film also features the Japanese spacecraft Hayabusa, whose control center is located in the nearby city of Saku. Hosoda included the spacecraft to support Japan's contribution towards space exploration.

The film was announced at the 2008 Tokyo International Anime Fair. At the 2009 Otakon convention Madhouse president Masao Maruyama said that Hosoda insisted on including 80 family members as its main characters. Maruyama then quipped that he asked Hosoda to promise only two main characters and two years of production for his next film. Summer Wars was one film in Madhouse's larger theatrical film release strategy, to release one new film each season for the next year. The release of Summer Wars was followed by Mai Mai Miracle and Yona Yona Penguin in 2009 with Redline released during the first half of 2010.

=== Music ===
==== Soundtrack ====
Akihiko Matsumoto composed the score for Summer Wars, with Randy Miller providing the additional music. The soundtrack of the film, titled Summer Wars Original Soundtrack (「サマーウォーズ」 オリジナル・サウンドトラック, Samā Wōzu Orijinaru Saundotorakku), was released by VAP on July 9, 2009. The release consists of 18 tracks. It remained on the Oricon music charts for four weeks and peaked at No. 112.

==== Bokura no Natsu no Yume ====
The film's theme song, titled "Bokura no Natsu no Yume" (僕らの夏の夢; lit. 'Our Summer Dream'), was written and performed by Tatsuro Yamashita. It was released by Warner Music Japan as a maxi single on August 19, 2009. The single included two other songs by Yamashita that are unrelated to the film. The first two songs have corresponding karaoke versions, and the third song is recorded from a live performance. The single peaked at eighth place on the Oricon charts.

== Release ==
=== Marketing ===
A high level of anticipation surrounded Summer Wars before its release, due to the critical and popular success of The Girl Who Leapt Through Time. Kadokawa Shoten promoted the film online through their official YouTube channel, aiming at international as well as domestic fans. On April 8, 2009, a one-minute high-definition (HD) trailer was released followed by a longer trailer on June 16. On July 29, the Japanese website of Yahoo! Movies streamed the first five minutes of the film and Kadokawa offered the footage on their YouTube channel several days later to allow for international viewing. It also offered two of the film's 15-second television adverts online. Before its release Masao Maruyama believed that "the film should be pretty popular, since the pre-sales for the tickets are very high".

Iqura Sugimoto's manga adaptation of the film was featured in the July 2009 debut issue of Kadokawa's manga magazine Young Ace. The first compilation volume of Sugimoto's work was released in Japan on August 10 and debuted in 23rd place on the Oricon comic ranking, selling 51,645 copies. The second volume was released on February 4, 2010, and debuted in 12th place, selling 53,333 copies. Sugimoto's manga was licensed into English by Vertical in January 2013, and the two volumes were released on October 22, 2013, and December 17, 2013. An additional manga side story was featured in the July 2009 issue of Comp Ace magazine.

=== Screenings and release ===
Summer Wars premiered in Japan on August 1, 2009. The film was distributed in South Korea by CJ Entertainment where it premiered on August 12. Cathay Organisation released Summer Wars in Singapore on February 25, 2010. Mighty Media released the film in Taiwan on June 4, 2010. The film was released by Eurozoom in France on June 9, 2010.

Summer Wars had its North American premiere on February 26, 2010, as the opening night event of the annual New York International Children's Film Festival with director Mamoru Hosoda in attendance. Hosoda answered audience questions following the film's screening through an interpreter. Hosoda and a producer subsequently appeared at the Massachusetts Institute of Technology (MIT) Comparative Media Studies Program on March 1, 2010, where they offered a public screening free of charge and answered questions. The film was also screened at the IndieLisboa Film Festival. The debut screening in Australia was on June 14, 2010, as part of the Sydney Film Festival. It also screened at Melbourne International Film Festival on August 8, 2010. The Leeds International Film Festival showed the film on November 20, 2009, and the English dubbed version of the film premiered at the New York International Children's Film Festival on November 20, 2010. At Otakon 2010 Funimation Entertainment announced that a limited release of the film would begin in theaters on December 3, 2010, at the Gene Siskel Film Center.

To celebrate the 10th anniversary of the release of Summer Wars, Studio Chizu announced in November 2019 that a 4DX version of the film would be shown in select theaters in Japan beginning on January 17, 2020.

The film received a theatrical one day 4K re-release in Australia on January 15, 2026, alongside The Girl Who Leapt Through Time and Wolf Children by Sugoi Co, followed by followed by Home Entertainment and Digital releases of all 3 films in February 2026 featuring Collector's Edition and Steel-Book Blu-Ray and UHD Blu-ray editions being available for the first time in Australia.

=== Television ===
Summer Wars aired on Adult Swim's Toonami block on December 14, 2013, with a rating of TV-14-LV. The film was watched by 1.36 million viewers. The movie aired again on Toonami on December 6, 2014, after the premiere of the ninth episode of Hellsing Ultimate.

== Reception ==
=== Critical response ===
On the review aggregator website Rotten Tomatoes, 78% of 23 critics' reviews are positive, with an average rating of 7.1/10. The website's consensus reads: "Family drama mixes with virtual online action in the breezy and entertaining Summer Wars." Metacritic, which uses a weighted average, assigned the film a score of 63 out of 100, based on 12 critics, indicating "generally favorable" reviews.

Mark Schilling of The Japan Times rated the film 5 out of 5 stars and observed that Summer Wars "may contain familiar elements, beginning with its bashful, moonstruck young hero, but it combines them in ways fresh, contemporary and dazzlingly imaginative". He also said that the film provides a social commentary on the differences between an "analog world" and a "realm of digital devices". Schilling titled his article "The future king of Japanese animation may be with us; Hosoda steps out of Miyazaki's shadow with dazzling new film". He praised Sadamoto, Aoyama and Nishida for producing "scenes of animated spectacle that, in their dazzling fluency of motion and untethered brilliance of invention, makes the usual SF/fantasy anime look childish and dull". Twitch Film published a review by Guillem Rosset who also referenced Miyazaki noting that following The Girl Who Leapt Through Time "cries went out immediately hailing him [Hosoda] as the heir apparent". He claimed that with Summer Wars, "Hosoda is the new king, the best story teller working within the animated medium in Japan and – quite possibly – the world." Rosset praised the film itself as "richly detailed and beautifully written...gorgeous to look at." and "blessed with an extensive cast of stunningly detailed and authentic characters." He concluded by saying "Hosoda has perfectly balanced the need to entertain via the visuals with the rich and satisfying character work that separates him from the massive pack of quality technicians to establish himself as truly a master story teller." He also noted that "The wonderful cast of characters is one of the film's greatest strengths" while also highlighting that, of the virtual world of OZ, "Here the creative minds of Madhouse can let their imagination run wild." With regards to the technical aspects, Rosset called the film "a top class audiovisual show." He concluded by writing "Mamoru Hosada deserves a place as one of the top contemporary Japanese animators. And it's good to know that once the time comes for Miyazaki to retire (not too soon I hope!) there's people capable of following his steps." The Korean newspaper Herald Business saw the film's fantasy theme and gorgeous animation as a differentiator from works produced by Hollywood studios.

Patrick W. Galbraith of Otaku2.com compared the design of OZ to Takashi Murakami's artwork, specifically "the flatness, or slick, polished surfaces" and then contrasted them with the sequences in Nagano noting, "it has a warm and lived in feel to it, aided by a scrupulous attention to detail." Of the story and characters Galbraith wrote that "scenes such as the large family coming together and talking over dinner are heartwarming and hilarious" and compared the movie to "a moving picture book, a family photo album turned back a few decades." He also noted the audience response, reporting sold-out screenings two nights in a row, and highlighting handwritten notes left at the theater by "hordes of fans who on the spot decided to move to Nagano." In conclusion, Galbraith wrote "there is an innocence and purity to this work that really reminds [him] of Miyazaki Hayao and Studio Ghibli back in the day, and the stellar backgrounds invoke Shinkai Makoto." Justin Sevakis of Anime News Network gave the film an 'A' rating and wrote that "decades from now, Summer Wars will be seen as the official arrival of [director] Mamoru Hosoda into the realm of historically important anime directors." He called the film "a near-perfect blend of social satire and science fiction, at once timely and timeless, sardonic and optimistic." and noted that the film is "practically overflowing with sharp social insight in a way we have not seen from anime in years." Sevakis praised Yoshiyuki Sadamoto's character designs and highlighted the visuals as "sharp and consistently great". In summing the film up he called Summer Wars "Incredibly entertaining, and intriguingly intelligent. Accessible and fast-paced. Pretty much perfect." Similarities have been commented on between the film and a previous work of Hosoda, Digimon Adventure: Our War Game. Neo magazine has stated that Our War Game is "plainly a prototype" of Summer Wars. Hosoda has stated that Our War Game "kind of started my idea for Summer Wars," noting that Summer Wars "became the feature-length version of that idea" and allowed him to explore material he was unable to in Our War Game's 40 minute runtime.

Rachel Saltz of The New York Times also gave a positive review of the film. Saltz praised Mamoru Hosoda's direction, and says it "matches the clean, classically composed images of his [Hosoda's] outer story." She further praised the visuals and themes, comparing it to those of director Yasujirō Ozu. In his review for Variety critic Peter Debruge stated that Hosoda's direction "appeals to the hard-to-please teen crowd by taking mind-bending ideas and planting them within a relatable contempo context." He also praised the CG animation in the OZ sequences. Peter Hartlaub of the San Francisco Chronicle praised Hosoda's style and said that it "adds enough dimensions to his characters and kinetic battles that the serene real world seems like a dream state." He also likened Hosoda's style to that of Hayao Miyazaki and Nintendo. Hartlaub complained that Kenji's character is "a bit too over-caffeinated in the first part" and concluded that the film is "the kind of fun and quirky film that you don't see very often in art houses this time of year." Ty Burr of The Boston Globe gave the film 3 out of 4 stars. He stated that "Summer Wars is most appealing in its hushed moments" and also praised Satoko Okudera's writing, stating that it "stakes a claim for the non-virtual world of history and of family ties that stretch back to Japan's medieval era." He also praised the OZ animation sequences as "visually ravishing explorations of white-on-white cyberspace, but the hectic gaming action sequences feel curiously passé." Burr notes that in the film, "it's what's old that's made to seem refreshingly new." Nicolas Rapold of The Village Voice also praised the film's visuals, and said that "it's hard to appreciate things like the character detail amid the insufferably squealy voicing and arbitrary suspense."

Kevin Thomas of the Los Angeles Times praised the film's visuals, stating that "Summer Wars is awesome in its detailed depiction of Oz, which floats in space with an array of satellites, and earthly cityscapes visited by calamities." Thomas also said the film is "also a superb example of Japanese anime, balancing science fiction fantasy with a paean to the timeless value of family life." and called it "a sophisticated yet poignant family entertainment with an appeal beyond Japanese animation buffs." Stephanie Merry of The Washington Post gave the film 2 out of 4 stars. Merry criticized the film's plot, stating that it "ventures into territory both melodramatic and corny." Merry also said that the relationship between Natsuki and Kenji "unfolds as blandly as a Debra Messing rom-com." Frank Scheck of The Hollywood Reporter stated that the "increasingly convoluted narrative may be too difficult to follow for younger viewers," but said that the film's "thematic ambition and dazzling visual style ultimately make it one of the more rewarding anime efforts to reach these [American] shores."

Retrospective reviews of the film have largely confirmed its enduring popularity and reputation. Writing for TheWrap, William Bibbiani named the film one of the ten best animated films of the 2010s (based on the US release date), while Toussaint Egan and Jason DeMarco of Paste Magazine and William Lobley of Empire declared the movie one of the best anime films of all time.

=== Box office performance ===
In Japan, Summer Wars ranked 7th in the box office, grossing an equivalent US$1.3 million on 127 screens during its opening weekend, and ending its run with a total gross of $17.4 million. In South Korea, the film debuted in 8th place and earned an equivalent of $369,156 on 118 screens with a total gross of $783,850. In Singapore, the film opened in 17th place and earned an equivalent of US$14,660 on 3 screens, and later concluded its run with a total gross $29,785. As of June 2010, the film went on to gross $18,353,560 worldwide. During the film's limited release in the United States, it grossed $1,412 and opened 76th at the box office in its opening weekend, later concluding its run with a total gross of $80,678. Cumulatively, Summer Wars earned a worldwide gross of $18.4 million.

=== Home media ===
Summer Wars was released in Japan on DVD and Blu-ray on March 3, 2010. The DVD version contains a 16-page booklet, OZ stickers, previews, interviews with the film's cast (Ryūnosuke Kamiki, Nanami Sakuraba, Sumiko Fuji, Mitsuki Tanimura and Ayumu Saitō) and an interview with director Mamoru Hosoda, while first press limited edition of the Blu-ray also included the same features, but also added hanafuda cards, an art book, and a film bookmark, and a making-of documentary. These releases were undertaken by Vap. In its first week of release the film became the top selling anime Blu-ray in Japan, with an estimated 54,000 copies sold and surpassed the previous record holder Evangelion: 1.0 You Are (Not) Alone. As of 2010, the film is the second highest Japanese Blu-ray debut overall, following Michael Jackson's This Is It. Based on pre-orders Summer Wars was expected to be eclipsed in sales by Evangelion: 2.0 You Can (Not) Advance on its release in May. Summer Wars also topped the Oricon Animation DVD charts with 55,375 copies sold in its first week. The Japanese Blu-ray release of Summer Wars was nominated for a Digital Entertainment Group of Japan (DEG Japan) Award for Best Interactivity. In Europe the DVD and Blu-ray was released on November 26, 2010, by Kazé. British distributor Manga Entertainment announced in January 2010 they had licensed Summer Wars for the United Kingdom, and was released in March 2011. In North America, Funimation released Summer Wars on DVD and Blu-ray on February 15, 2011. The North American DVD and Blu-ray releases included previews, and the interviews with Hosoda, Kamiki, Sakuraba, Fuji, Tanimura and Saitō. The first press copies included art cards. To get out enough copies to meet demand some did not ship with the OZ O-card (cardboard slip-cover), as it required specialty printing that takes longer to produce than the rest of the product. Funimation offered to send out the O-Card to customers who did not receive one as soon as they are available if they fill out a request form on their official website. On January 30, 2025, it was announced the film would be released on 4K UHD on April 1, 2025.

=== Awards and nominations ===
Summer Wars was the first Japanese animated film to be included as a competitor at the Locarno International Film Festival awards in Switzerland, where it was nominated for the 2009 Golden Leopard award. The film made its international premiere at the festival's celebration of manga, paying tribute to its impact on the animation industry. Although the film did not win the award the Swiss newspaper Tribune de Genève said it was, "by far, the best film we could find" in the competition and noted that the film would have been the logical winner given the festival's theme. The film was featured in the Sitges Film Festival in the Oficial Fantàstic Panorama category, where it won the Gertie Award for Best Animated Feature Film. Summer Wars received an award for new media from Japan's Ministry of Economy, Trade and Industry on October 24, 2009, at the Digital Content Association of Japan's annual convention. Summer Wars was also nominated for Best Animated Feature Film at the Asia Pacific Screen Awards, although it did not win. The film was awarded the Animation Division Grand Prize at the 13th Japan Media Arts Festival which Hosoda's The Girl Who Leapt Through Time won in 2006. Summer Wars won an Award of Excellence in Animation along with four other films at the 33rd Japan Academy Prizes. The Award of Excellence is in effect a nomination for the Animation of the Year Prize, which it won in the final ceremony on March 5, 2010. The film was shown at the 60th Berlin International Film Festival in February as part of the Generation 14plus program. Summer Wars won the Audience Award for Best Animation Feature at the Anaheim International Film Festival. Funimation, along with GKIDS, submitted the film for Best Animated Feature for the 83rd Academy Awards. The film was the 14th submission for the category. Summer Wars won the Best Animation Film Award at the 70th Mainichi Film Awards. Hosoda received an Annie Award nomination as Best Director, becoming the fourth Japanese individual (after Mamoru Oshii, Hayao Miyazaki, and Satoshi Kon) to be nominated in the category.
