= Masakatsu Takagi =

Japanese musician (born 1979)

Masakatsu Takagi 高木正勝
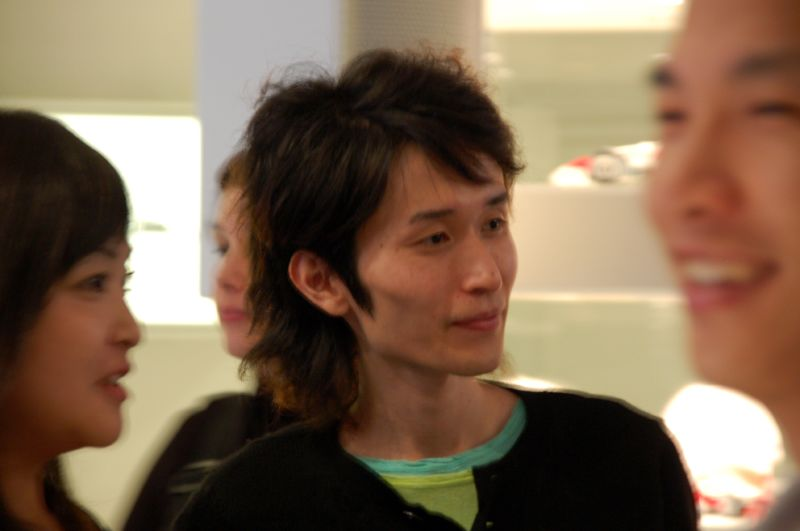
- Masakatsu Takagi at a Nuit Blanche for Toyota in Paris, France in 2006

Background information
- Born: October 3, 1979 (age 46); Kameoka, Kyoto Prefecture, Japan
- Genres: Classical; Ambient; Film score; Glitch; Electronic
- Occupations: Musician, Composer, Visual Artist
- Instrument: Piano
- Years active: 2001-present
- Website: http://www.takagimasakatsu.com/

Masakatsu Takagi (高木 正勝, Takagi Masakatsu; born 1979) is a musician and visual artist from Kameoka, Kyoto, Japan. He is well known for writing scores for director Mamoru Hosoda's films, alongside his solo work.

== Career ==
Takagi's work as a visual artist has been showcased at the Museum of Contemporary Art Tokyo, Toyota Municipal Museum of Art, Taipei Fine Arts Museum, and the São Paulo Museum of Modern Art. His work was noticed by Apple Inc., and he was featured in a 3-minute promotional video for the company about how Takagi creates his videos on a Macintosh system, and Apple Pro software, including Final Cut Pro and Logic Pro. He also uses Adobe After Effects and Adobe Photoshop in his videos.

From a period in 2003 to 2004 he toured with David Sylvian on the "Fire in the Forest" Tour, creating visuals to accompany the performances. The two later collaborated on the track "Exit/Delete" from Coieda (2004).

In 2011, Takagi's song "Nijiko" was used in a video for an Intel's "Museum of Me". The video won six awards at the 2012 Cannes Lions International Festival of Creativity.

He wrote the score for Mamoru Hosoda's films Wolf Children (2012), The Boy and the Beast (2015) and Mirai (2018). His score for Wolf Children was selected as "iTunes Best Soundtrack of 2012" in Japan. He also wrote the music for the Studio Ghibli documentary The Kingdom of Dreams and Madness (2013).

Shortly after moving to a small village in Hyōgo, Japan, Takagi recorded Kagayaki (2014), blending his background in classical music with Japanese folk music. The album was recorded in nature and among the local villagers, who sing on the album. It is his most critically acclaimed solo work and is ranked number one on the website Rate Your Music's New Age charts.

In 2018 he began the Marginalia series, a series of improvised piano performances from his private studio in Hyōgo recorded with the windows open to capture the sound of the local nature and wildlife. These recordings are released on Bandcamp and Spotify, and the works have resulted in five studio albums.

== Personal life ==
Takagi was born in Kameoka, Kyoto, Japan on October 3, 1979, and began playing music and creating visual art at an early age. As his interest in visual art grew, he began creating music videos for his musician friends, and video projections to be displayed in art galleries. He later attended Kyoto University of Foreign Studies, graduating with English.

In 2013 Takagi moved to a village in Hyōgo Prefecture where he lives with his wife and children. He spends his free time renovating old folk houses and cultivating his own vegetable garden.

== Discography ==
=== Studio albums ===
Title	Year
pia	2001
opus pia	2002
eating	2002
JOURNAL FOR PEOPLE	2002
eating 2	2003
rehome	2003
sail	2003
world is so beautiful	2003
COIEDA	2004
AIR'S NOTE	2006
BLOOMY GIRLS	2006
Private/Public	2007
Tai Rei Tei Rio	2009
Ymene	2010
Niyodo	2011
Tama Tama	2011
Wolf Children	2012
Omusuhi	2013
Kagayaki	2014
The Boy and the Beast	2015
Mirai	2018
Marginalia	2018
Marginalia II	2019
Marginalia III	2021
Marginalia IV	2021
Okaeri Mone	2021
Marginalia V	2023
Gifts from the Kitchen	2024
Worlds Apart	2024
Marginalia VI	2024
A Time to Sing	2025
Marginalia VII	2025
Hibi Piano 2011 - 2022	2025
Marginalia VIII	2026
