= Studio Chizu =

Japanese animation studio

Chizu, Inc.
- Native name: 株式会社地図
- Romanized name: Chizu kabushiki-gaisha
- Type: Private KK
- Industry: Animation
- Founded: April 2011; 15 years ago
- Founders: Mamoru Hosoda; Yuichiro Saito
- Headquarters: Amanuma, Suginami, Tokyo, Japan
- Key people: Yuichiro Saito (CEO)
- Subsidiaries: Chizu Music Supervision
- Website: studiochizu.com

Chizu, Inc. (Japanese: 株式会社地図, Hepburn: Chizu kabushiki-gaisha), also known as Studio Chizu (Japanese: スタジオ地図, Hepburn: Sutajio Chizu), is a Japanese independent animation studio based in Suginami, Tokyo, Japan. It was co-founded by Mamoru Hosoda and Yuichiro Saito in 2011. Studio Chizu has won three Japan Academy Prize for Animation of the Year awards. The image in their logo is a reference to Makoto Konno, the main character of the Hosoda-directed 2006 film The Girl Who Leapt Through Time.

== History ==
Studio Chizu was founded by Yūichirō Saitō and Mamoru Hosoda, both of which had ties to animation studio Madhouse. Saitō had been with Madhouse since 1999, and had co-produced The Girl Who Leapt Through Time, which Mamoru Hosoda directed. The aim of the studio was described by Saito as an "auteur's studio" for Hosoda, who himself mentioned that creating Studio Chizu was necessary in order for him to make the films that he wanted to make.

Studio Chizu co-produced its first feature film Wolf Children with Madhouse, which was released in 2012. It earned roughly $55 million and won its first Japan Academy Prize for Animation of the Year. In 2013, the studio was approached by a representative of French film company Gaumont, who wanted to work with Studio Chizu to distribute its films internationally. This distribution partnership was announced in 2014.

The studio went on to produce The Boy and the Beast, which was released in 2015 earning roughly $49 million and winning for a second time the Japan Academy Prize for Animation of the Year.

Studio Chizu produced Hosoda's next film, Mirai, in 2018 and received an Oscar nomination for Best Animated Feature. This film also won the studio its third Japan Academy Prize for Animation of the Year in March 2019. The next film Belle, written and directed by Mamoru Hosoda, premiered on July 15, 2021 at the 2021 Cannes Film Festival, where it was well-received by critics with a standing ovation that lasted 14 minutes. It was theatrically released in Japan on July 16, 2021. It was theatrically released in the United States on January 14, 2022.

== Feature films ==
Year	Title	Director	Screenwriter(s)	Music	RT
2012	Wolf Children	Mamoru Hosoda	Mamoru Hosoda & Satoko Okudera	Masakatsu Takagi	95%
2015	The Boy and the Beast	Mamoru Hosoda		Masakatsu Takagi	88%
2018	Mirai	Mamoru Hosoda		Masakatsu Takagi	91%
2021	Belle	Mamoru Hosoda		Taisei Iwasaki, Yuta Bandoh, Ludvig Forssell, & Miho Sakai	95%
2025	Scarlet	Mamoru Hosoda		Taisei Iwasaki	74%
