= Kazuhiro Yamaji =

Japanese actor (born 1954)

- 山路 和弘
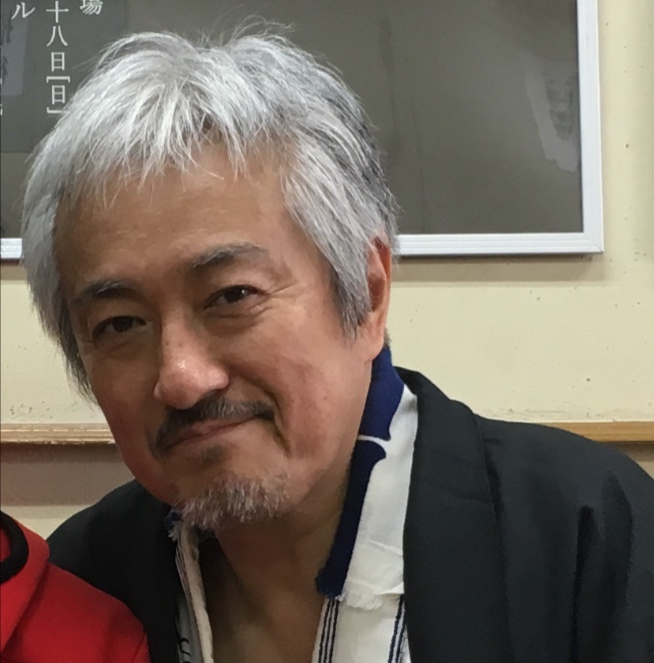
- Kazuhiro Yamaji in 2017
- Born: June 4, 1954 (age 72); Mie Prefecture, Japan
- Occupations: Actor; voice actor
- Years active: 1979–present
- Agent: Seinenza Theater Company
- Spouse: Romi Park (m. 2020)

Kazuhiro Yamaji (山路 和弘, Yamaji Kazuhiro; born June 4, 1954) is a Japanese actor and voice actor affiliated with the Seinenza Theater Company. He has been married to Romi Park since 2020.

== Filmography ==
=== Live-action films ===
- 2000: Whiteout (Takayoshi Yoshikane)
- 2001: Inugami (Takanao)
- 2004: Kamen Rider Blade: Missing Ace (Kei Karasuma)
- 2004: Premonition (Dr. Mitamura)
- 2010: Made in Japan: Kora! (Kanji)
- 2012: Bayside Shakedown: The Final (Fukuda)
- 2015: The Emperor in August (Tōji Yasui)
- 2015: Kakekomi (Keisai Eisen)
- 2017: Teiichi: Battle of Supreme High (Usaburō Tōgō)
- 2018: Laughing Under the Clouds
- 2021: Baragaki: Unbroken Samurai (Hikogorō Satō)
- 2021: Janitor (Majima)
- 2023: The Sound of an Empty Hole in My Heart (Tokunaga)

=== Television dramas ===
- 1978: Taiyō ni Hoero!
- 1997: Gift
- 1997: Under the Same Roof (Sigeru Terada)
- 1998: Nemureru Mori
- 2004: Kamen Rider Blade (Kei Karasuma (eps. 1 – 8, 15, 16, 25, 49))
- 2007: Kamen Rider Den-O (Leo Imagin (ep. 37 – 38))
- 2014: Gunshi Kanbei (Ankokuji Ekei)
- 2016: Naomi and Kanako
- 2017: I'm Sorry, I Love You (Tatsuomi Kurokawa)
- 2019: Idaten (Ryōhei Murayama)
- 2020: Awaiting Kirin (Miyoshi Nagayoshi)
- 2020: Cold Case Season 3
- 2020–2021: Mashin Sentai Kiramager (Emperor Yodon)
- 2022: Chimudondon (Zen'ichi Maeda)
- 2022: Elpis (The deputy prime minister Yūji Daimon)
- 2022: Accomplishment of Fudanshi Bartender (Obuchizawa)
- 2023: Ohsama Sentai King-Ohger (Goma Rosalia's voice)
- 2024: Golden Kamuy: The Hunt of Prisoners in Hokkaido (Kiyohiro Suzukawa)
- 2025: Unbound (Ōgi-ya)

=== Stage ===
- 1981–1982: The Threepenny Opera
- 1990: Yotsuya Kaidan (oiwa, osode)
- 1991: Carmen (Don José)
- 1995: The Lady of the Camellias
- 2000: Phoenix (Fujiwara no Nakamaro)
- 2006: Marie Antoinette (Beaumarchais)
- 2006–2013: Anna Karenina (Karenin)
- 2007–2010: Takarazuka Boys (Kazuya Ikeda)
- 2012: Hamlet (Polonius)
- 2017: Edo Kaikitan: Mukasari (The storyteller)
- 2018: Mary Poppins (George Banks)
- 2018: Of Mice and Men (Candy)
- 2019: Crime and Punishment (Svidrigaïlov)
- 2021: Musical GOYA

=== Anime series ===
- 1996: Detective Conan (Yukio Ayashiro)
- 1997: Detective Conan (Noboru Taniguchi)
- 1998: Rurouni Kenshin (First Lieutenant Meldars)
- 2001: Geneshaft (Larry)
- 2001: Sadamitsu the Destroyer (Ponkotsu / Junk)
- 2001: Gensomaden Saiyuki (Gojun)
- 2002: Detective Conan (Kyōgo Kitaura)
- 2003: Last Exile (Ressius)
- 2005: Onegai My Melody (Grandfather)
- 2005: Monster (Rheinhart Dinger)
- 2006: Mushishi (Amane's Father)
- 2012: Psycho-Pass (Jōji Saiga)
- 2012: Sword Art Online (Shozo Yuuki)
- 2013: DokiDoki! PreCure (Bel)
- 2014: One Piece (Señor Pink / Figarland Garling)
- 2014: Psycho-Pass 2 (Jōji Saiga)
- 2014: Space Dandy (Meow's Father)
- 2014: Yu-Gi-Oh! Arc-V (Narrator)
- 2014: Garo: Honō no Kokuin (León's Grandfather)
- 2015: One-Punch Man (Silver Fang)
- 2015: Senki Zesshou Symphogear GX (Yatsuhiro Kazanari (ep. 6, 13))
- 2016: Dragon Ball Super (Hit)
- 2016: 91 Days (Vincent)
- 2016: One Piece (Gildo Tesoro)
- 2017: Blue Exorcist: Kyoto Saga (Saburota Todo)
- 2017: Gintama. (Uranus Hankai)
- 2017: Granblue Fantasy The Animation (Eugen (Game Voiced by Keiji Fujiwara) (eps. 9 – 10, 12))
- 2017: Senki Zesshou Symphogear AXZ (Yatsuhiro Kazanari (ep. 6, 13))
- 2017: Altair: A Record of Battles (Silvestro Brega)
- 2017: Kamiwaza Wanda (Great)
- 2018: Kokkoku: Moment by Moment (Old Man)
- 2018: Attack On Titan Season 3 (Captain Kenny Ackerman)
- 2019: One-Punch Man 2 (Silver Fang)
- 2019: Senki Zesshou Symphogear XV (Yatsuhiro Kazanari)
- 2020: Wave, Listen to Me! (Katsumi Kureko)
- 2020: The God of High School (Jin Taejin)
- 2021: Dragon Quest: The Adventure of Dai (Matoriv)
- 2021: Farewell, My Dear Cramer (Kenroku Washizu)
- 2021: How Not to Summon a Demon Lord Ω (Batutta)
- 2021: Megaton Musashi (Genta Ibushi)
- 2022: Spy × Family (Henry Henderson)
- 2022: Lucifer and the Biscuit Hammer (Inachika Akitani)
- 2023: High Card (Bernard Symons)
- 2023: Dead Mount Death Play (Rozan Shinoyama)
- 2023: Ron Kamonohashi's Forbidden Deductions (John Grizzly)
- 2024: The Foolish Angel Dances with the Devil (Shiromura)
- 2024: The Witch and the Beast (The Executioner)
- 2024: Meiji Gekken: 1874 (Buhei Hiramatsu)
- 2025: #Compass 2.0: Combat Providence Analysis System (Gustav Heydrich)
- 2026: Nippon Sangoku (Mitsuhide Ryūmon)
- 2026: The Ghost in the Shell (Daisuke Aramaki)

=== Original video animation ===
- 1995: Black Jack (Dr. Kiriko)
- 1998: Tekken: The Motion Picture (Kazuya Mishima)
- 2000: Master Keaton (James Kelling)
- 2005: Final Fantasy VII Advent Children (Cid Highwind)

=== Original net animation ===
- 2021: Record of Ragnarok (Kojirō Sasaki)
- 2023: Make My Day (Walter)
- 2023: Pluto (Professor Abullah)
- 2025: Bullet/Bullet (Shirokuma)

=== Anime films ===
- 1995: Ghost in the Shell (Cleaning staff)
- 1997: Detective Conan: The Time-Bombed Skyscraper (Daisuke Kurokawa)
- 2002: Crayon Shin-chan: The Storm Called: The Battle of the Warring States (Okurai Takatora)
- 2004: Saint Seiya (Apollon)
- 2015: The Boy and the Beast (Iōzen)
- 2015: Psycho-Pass: The Movie (Jōji Saiga)
- 2016: One Piece Film: Gold (Gildo Tesoro)
- 2016: Yu-Gi-Oh!: The Dark Side of Dimensions (Ryō Bakura's Father)
- 2017: The Night Is Short, Walk on Girl (Tōdō-san)
- 2017: Blame! (Oyassan)
- 2017: Detective Conan: Crimson Love Letter (Heizo Hattori)
- 2017: Godzilla: Planet of the Monsters (Endurphe)
- 2018: Mobile Suit Gundam Narrative (Abaev)
- 2021: Sword Art Online Progressive: Aria of a Starless Night (Shozo Yuuki)
- 2023: Sand Land (Rao)
- 2023: Birth of Kitarō: The Mystery of GeGeGe (Katsunori)
- 2025: Doraemon: Nobita's Art World Tales (Sodro)
- 2025: Batman Ninja vs. Yakuza League (Ra's al Ghul)
- 2025: Scarlet (Polonius)
- 2027: Ghost (Ahab)

=== Video games ===
- 1999: Crash Team Racing (Japanese dub) – Pinstripe Potoroo
- 2001: Mobile Suit Gundam: Zeonic Front – Lou Roher
- 2003: Spider-Man (Japanese dub) – Norman Osborn/Green Goblin
- 2003: Glass Rose – Ryouji Ihara
- 2005: Kingdom Hearts II – Cid Highwind
- 2005: Rogue Galaxy – Zegram Ghart
- 2005: Yakuza – Makoto Date
- 2006: Dirge of Cerberus: Final Fantasy VII – Cid Highwind
- 2006: Yakuza 2 – Makoto Date
- 2009: Yakuza 3 – Makoto Date
- 2010: Yakuza 4 – Makoto Date
- 2011: Yakuza: Dead Souls – Makoto Date
- 2012: Yakuza 5 – Makoto Date
- 2013: Beyond: Two Souls (Japanese dub) – Nathan Dawkins
- 2013: Call of Duty: Ghosts (Japanese dub) – Gabriel Rorke
- 2014: Ryū ga Gotoku Ishin! – Nakaoka Shintarō
- 2015: Lego Marvel Super Heroes (Japanese dub) – Wolverine
- 2015: The Witcher 3: Wild Hunt (Japanese dub) – Geralt of Rivia
- 2016: Yakuza Kiwami – Makoto Date
- 2016: Yakuza 6 – Makoto Date
- 2017: Resident Evil 7: Biohazard (Japanese dub) – Jack Baker
- 2017: Fate/Grand Order – Yagyu Tajima-no-Kami Munenori
- 2017: Yakuza Kiwami 2 – Makoto Date
- 2018: Dragon Ball FighterZ – Hit
- 2018: Soulcalibur VI – Geralt of Rivia
- 2018: Street Fighter V: Arcade Edition – G
- 2019: Jump Force – Prometheus / Director Glover
- 2019: Death Stranding (Japanese dub) – Cliff
- 2020: Yakuza: Like a Dragon – Makoto Date
- 2020: Kingdom Hearts III Re Mind – Cid Highwind
- 2020: Nioh 2 – Saitō Dōsan
- 2020: War of the Visions Final Fantasy Brave Exvius – Eldo Leonis
- 2021: Nier Reincarnation – Argo
- 2023: Like a Dragon: Ishin! – Nakaoka Shintarō
- 2023: Ys X: Nordics – Grimson Balta
- 2024: Granblue Fantasy: Relink – Eugen
- 2024: Like a Dragon: Infinite Wealth – Makoto Date
- 2024: Final Fantasy VII Rebirth – Cid Highwind
- 2024: Rise of the Rōnin – Kaishu Katsu

=== Dubbing roles ===
==== Live-action ====
- Jason Statham
  - Lock, Stock and Two Smoking Barrels (Bacon)
  - Snatch (Turkish)
  - The Transporter (Frank Martin)
  - Revolver (Jake Green)
  - Transporter 2 (Frank Martin)
  - Crank (Chev Chelios)
  - The Bank Job (Terry Leather)
  - Death Race (Jensen Ames)
  - Transporter 3 (Frank Martin)
  - Crank: High Voltage (Chev Chelios)
  - 13 (Jasper Bagges)
  - The Expendables (Lee Christmas)
  - Blitz (Tom Brant)
  - Killer Elite (Danny Bryce)
  - The Mechanic (Arthur Bishop)
  - The Expendables 2 (Lee Christmas)
  - Safe (Luke Wright)
  - Fast & Furious 6 (Deckard Shaw)
  - Homefront (Phil Broker)
  - Hummingbird (Joey Jones)
  - Parker (Parker)
  - The Expendables 3 (Lee Christmas)
  - Furious 7 (Deckard Shaw)
  - Wild Card (Nick Wild)
  - Spy (Rick Ford)
  - Mechanic: Resurrection (Arthur Bishop)
  - The Fate of the Furious (Deckard Shaw)
  - The Meg (Jonas Taylor)
  - Hobbs & Shaw (Deckard Shaw)
  - F9 (Deckard Shaw)
  - Wrath of Man (Patrick "H" Hill / Mason Hargreaves)
  - Fast X (Deckard Shaw)
  - Meg 2: The Trench (Jonas Taylor)
  - Operation Fortune: Ruse de Guerre (Orson)
  - Expend4bles (Lee Christmas)
  - The Beekeeper (Adam Clay)
- Hugh Jackman
  - Swordfish (Stanley Jobson)
  - X2: X-Men United (Logan / Wolverine)
  - Van Helsing (Gabriel / Van Helsing)
  - The Fountain (Tomas / Tommy / Tom Creo)
  - The Prestige (Robert Angier)
  - X-Men: The Last Stand (Logan / Wolverine)
  - Australia (Drover)
  - Deception (Jamie Getz a.k.a. Wyatt Bose)
  - X-Men Origins: Wolverine (James Howlett / Logan / Wolverine)
  - Real Steel (Charles 'Charlie' Kenton)
  - X-Men: First Class (Logan)
  - Prisoners (2016 BS Japan edition) (Keller Dover)
  - The Wolverine (Logan / Wolverine)
  - X-Men: Days of Future Past (Logan / Wolverine)
  - Night at the Museum: Secret of the Tomb (Hugh Jackman)
  - Chappie (Vincent Moore)
  - Me and Earl and the Dying Girl (Hugh Jackman)
  - Eddie the Eagle (Bronson Peary)
  - Logan (Logan / Wolverine / James Howlett)
  - The Greatest Showman (P. T. Barnum)
  - Deadpool 2 (Logan / Wolverine)
  - The Front Runner (Gary Hart)
  - Reminiscence (Nick Bannister)
  - Deadpool & Wolverine (Logan / Wolverine)
- Russell Crowe
  - Rough Magic (Alex Ross)
  - Mystery, Alaska (Sheriff John Biebe)
  - Gladiator (Maximus Decimus Meridius)
  - Cinderella Man (James J. Braddock)
  - 3:10 to Yuma (Ben Wade)
  - American Gangster (Det. Richie Roberts)
  - State of Play (Cal McAffrey)
  - The Next Three Days (John Brennan)
  - Robin Hood (Robin Longstride / Robin Hood)
  - The Man with the Iron Fists (Jack Knife)
  - Broken City (Mayor Nicholas Hostetler)
  - The Water Diviner (Joshua Connor)
  - Fathers and Daughters (Jake Davis)
  - The Mummy (Dr. Henry Jekyll)
  - The Loudest Voice (Roger Ailes)
  - Kraven the Hunter (Nikolai Kravinoff)
  - Land of Bad (Eddie Grimm)
- Sean Penn
  - U Turn (Bobby Cooper)
  - The Thin Red Line (1st Sgt. Edward Welsh)
  - I Am Sam (Sam Dawson)
  - Mystic River (Jimmy Markum)
  - The Interpreter (Tobin Keller)
  - Fair Game (Joseph Wilson)
  - The Tree of Life (Jack)
  - Gangster Squad (Mickey Cohen)
  - The Secret Life of Walter Mitty (Sean O'Connell)
  - The Gunman (Jim Terrier)
  - The Professor and the Madman (Dr. William Chester Minor)
- Song Kang-ho
  - Shiri (Lee Jang-gil)
  - Joint Security Area (Sergeant Oh Kyeong-pil)
  - Sympathy for Mr. Vengeance (Park Dong-jin)
  - Memories of Murder (Detective Park Doo-man)
  - Antarctic Journal (Choi Do-hyung)
  - The Host (Park Gang-du)
  - Secret Sunshine (Kim Jong-chan)
  - Snowpiercer (Namgoong Minsu)
  - The Throne (King Yeongjo)
  - Parasite (Kim Ki-taek)
  - The King's Letters (King Sejong the Great)
- Willem Dafoe
  - Edges of the Lord (Priest)
  - Spider-Man (Norman Osborn / Green Goblin)
  - Once Upon a Time in Mexico (Armando Barillo)
  - XXX: State of the Union (George Deckert)
  - Cirque du Freak: The Vampire's Assistant (Gavner Purl)
  - John Wick (Marcus)
  - Dog Eat Dog (Mad Dog)
  - The Lighthouse (Thomas Wake)
  - Spider-Man: No Way Home (Norman Osborn / Green Goblin)
  - Beetlejuice Beetlejuice (Wolf Jackson)
- Al Pacino
  - The Godfather (2001 DVD edition) (Michael Corleone)
  - The Godfather Part II (2001 DVD edition) (Michael Corleone)
  - Scarface (2004 DVD edition) (Tony Montana)
  - Righteous Kill (Detective David Fisk/"Rooster"/The "Poetry Boy" Killer)
  - The Son of No One (Detective Stanford)
  - Stand Up Guys (Valentine "Val")
  - Misconduct (Charles Abrams)
  - The Irishman (James Riddle "Jimmy" Hoffa)
  - Once Upon a Time in Hollywood (Marvin Schwarz)
- Christoph Waltz
  - Inglourious Basterds (Col. Hans Landa)
  - Carnage (Alan Cowan)
  - Django Unchained (Dr. King Schultz)
  - The Zero Theorem (Qohen Leth)
  - Spectre (Ernst Stavro Blofeld)
  - The Legend of Tarzan (Captain Léon Rom)
  - Downsizing (Dušan Mirković)
  - No Time to Die (Ernst Stavro Blofeld)
- Vincent Cassel
  - The Crimson Rivers (Max Kerkerian)
  - Brotherhood of the Wolf (Jean-François de Morangias)
  - Irréversible (Marcus)
  - Secret Agents (Brisseau)
  - Beauty and the Beast (La Bête (The Beast)/Le Prince (The Prince))
  - Tale of Tales (King of Strongcliff)
  - Jason Bourne (2022 BS Tokyo edition) (The Asset)
  - Westworld (Engerraund Serac)
- Kim Yoon-seok
  - The Chaser (Eom Joong-ho)
  - The Yellow Sea (Myun Jung-hak)
  - The Priests (Father Kim)
  - The Fortress (Kim Sang-hun)
  - 1987: When the Day Comes (Commissioner Park Cheo-won)
  - Dark Figure of Crime (Kim Hyung-min)
- Benicio del Toro
  - Fear and Loathing in Las Vegas (2014 Blu-ray and DVD editions) (Dr. Gonzo)
  - Traffic (Javier Rodriguez)
  - Sin City (Detective Lieutenant Jack "Jackie Boy" Rafferty)
  - Things We Lost in the Fire (Jerry Sunborne)
  - The Wolfman (Lawrence Talbot/The Wolfman)
  - No Sudden Move (Ronald Russo)
- Gary Oldman
  - Sin (Charlie Strom)
  - Batman Begins (2007 NTV edition) (Commissioner Gordon)
  - The Unborn (Rabbi Joseph Sendak)
  - Paranoia (Nicholas Wyatt)
  - Mank (Herman J. Mankiewicz)
  - Crisis (Dr. Tyrone Brower)
- Kevin Bacon
  - Wild Things (Sergeant Ray Duquette)
  - Hollow Man (Sebastian Caine)
  - The Following (Ryan Hardy)
  - Cop Car (Sheriff Kretzer)
  - Patriots Day (Richard DesLauriers)
- Val Kilmer
  - Heat (1998 TV Asahi edition) (Chris Shiherlis)
  - Mindhunters (Jake Harris)
  - Felon (John Smith)
  - Hardwired (Virgil Kirkhill)
  - The Birthday Cake (Uncle Angelo)
- Mark Ruffalo
  - My Life Without Me (Lee)
  - Collateral (Ray Fanning)
  - Mickey 17 (Kenneth Marshall)
  - Crime 101 (Det. Lou Lubesnick)
- Nicolas Cage
  - World Trade Center (John McLoughlin)
  - The Frozen Ground (Jack Halcombe)
  - Mandy (Red)
  - Color Out of Space (Nathan Gardner)
- Viggo Mortensen
  - A Perfect Murder (David Shaw)
  - A Walk on the Moon (Walker Jerome)
  - 28 Days (Eddie Boone)
  - Hidalgo (Frank Hopkins)
- 10,000 BC (Tic'Tic (Cliff Curtis))
- 300: Rise of an Empire (Themistocles (Sullivan Stapleton))
- 3000 Miles to Graceland (Michael Zane (Kurt Russell))
- 54 (Steve Rubell (Mike Myers))
- The Alamo (James Bowie (Jason Patric))
- Alien Resurrection (Frank Elgyn (Michael Wincott))
- All or Nothing (Phil (Timothy Spall))
- Anchorman: The Legend of Ron Burgundy (Ron Burgundy (Will Ferrell))
- Anna Magdalena (Yau Muk-yan (Aaron Kwok))
- Aquaman and the Lost Kingdom (Kordax (Pilou Asbæk))
- Arlington Road (Oliver Lang/William Fenimore (Tim Robbins))
- The Assignment (Lt. Cmdr. Annibal Ramirez / Carlos (Aidan Quinn))
- Avatar: Fire and Ash (Peylak (David Thewlis))
- Avengers: Infinity War (Johann Schmidt/Red Skull (Ross Marquand))
- Avengers: Endgame (Johann Schmidt/Red Skull (Ross Marquand))
- Bad Company (Roland Yates (John Slattery))
- Bandidas (Tyler Jackson (Dwight Yoakam))
- Basic (Tom Hardy (John Travolta))
- Bedtime Stories (Kendall Duncan (Guy Pearce))
- Behind Enemy Lines (Master Chief Tom O'Malley (David Keith))
- Ben-Hur (2000 TV Tokyo edition) (Messala (Stephen Boyd))
- The BFG (The BFG (Mark Rylance))
- The Big Lebowski (VHS/DVD edition) (Jeffrey "The Dude" Lebowski (Jeff Bridges))
- Big Trouble (Arthur Herk (Stanley Tucci))
- Black Hawk Down (2004 TV Tokyo edition) (SFC Norm "Hoot" Gibson (Eric Bana))
- Blade (2001 TV Tokyo edition) (Deacon Frost (Stephen Dorff))
- The Boondock Saints II: All Saints Day (Connor McManus (Sean Patrick Flanery))
- Captain America: The First Avenger (Johann Schmidt/Red Skull (Hugo Weaving))
- Cats (Growltiger (Ray Winstone))
- Cats & Dogs (Mister Tinkles (Sean Hayes))
- Charlie's Angels: Full Throttle (Ray Carter (Robert Patrick))
- The Chronicles of Narnia: The Voyage of the Dawn Treader (Lord Drinian (Gary Sweet))
- Clash of the Titans (2012 TV Asahi edition) (Draco (Mads Mikkelsen))
- Cold Creek Manor (Dale Massie (Stephen Dorff))
- Collateral Damage (Peter Brandt (Elias Koteas))
- College Road Trip (Chief James Porter (Martin Lawrence))
- The Counterfeiters (Salomon Sorowitsch (Karl Markovics))
- Courage Under Fire (Lieutenant Colonel Nathaniel Serling (Denzel Washington))
- Crash (Detective Graham Waters (Don Cheadle))
- The Dark Knight Rises (Bane (Tom Hardy))
- Day of the Dead (2020 Blu-ray edition) (Captain Henry Rhodes (Joseph Pilato))
- The Detonator (2009 TV Tokyo edition) (Michael Shepard (William Hope))
- Desperado (1998 TV Asahi edition) (El Mariachi (Antonio Banderas))
- Desperate Measures (Peter J. McCabe (Michael Keaton))
- Dick (H. R. Haldeman (Dave Foley))
- Doctor Who (Ninth Doctor (Christopher Eccleston)
- Down with Love (Peter MacMannus (David Hyde Pierce))
- Dr. Strangelove (Group Captain Lionel Mandrake, President Merkin Muffley, Dr. Strangelove (Peter Sellers))
- Dreamcatcher (Owen Underhill (Tom Sizemore))
- Dreamer (Benjamin "Ben" Crane (Kurt Russell))
- Driven (2005 NTV edition) (Beau Brandenburg (Til Schweiger))
- The Equalizer (Teddy (Marton Csokas))
- Escape from L.A. (Snake Plissken (Kurt Russell))
- The Evening Star (Jerry Bruckner (Bill Paxton))
- Farewell My Concubine (Xiaodouzi (Leslie Cheung))
- Fargo (Lorne Malvo (Billy Bob Thornton))
- The Fatal Encounter (Gwang-baek (Cho Jae-hyun))
- The Fighter (Dick "Dicky" Eklund (Christian Bale))
- First Man (Deke Slayton (Kyle Chandler))
- Fosse/Verdon (Bob Fosse (Sam Rockwell))
- Galaxy Quest (Guy Fleegman (Sam Rockwell))
- The General's Daughter (Colonel Kent (Timothy Hutton))
- Genius (C. L. Franklin (Courtney B. Vance))
- The Glimmer Man (1999 TV Asahi edition) (Detective Jim Campbell (Keenen Ivory Wayans))
- Goal! (Glen Foy (Stephen Dillane))
- Godzilla vs. Kong (Walter Simmons (Demián Bichir))
- The Haunted Mansion (Master Edward Gracey (Nathaniel Parker))
- Hawaii Five-0 (Danny "Danno" Williams (Scott Caan))
- The Hitchhiker's Guide to the Galaxy (Zaphod Beeblebrox (Sam Rockwell))
- The Hobbit: The Desolation of Smaug (Bard the Bowman (Luke Evans))
- The Hobbit: The Battle of the Five Armies (Bard the Bowman (Luke Evans))
- The Hunted (Paul Racine (Christopher Lambert))
- Hypnotic (Jeremiah (Jackie Earle Haley))
- I Come with the Rain (Hasford (Elias Koteas))
- Infernal Affairs (Chan Wing-yan (Tony Leung Chiu-wai / Shawn Yue))
- Infernal Affairs III (Chan Wing-yan (Tony Leung Chiu-wai))
- Inside Man (Detective Keith Frazier (Denzel Washington))
- The King's Man (Grigori Rasputin (Rhys Ifans))
- Kung Fu Yoga (Rendall (Sonu Sood))
- Lamb (Ingvar (Hilmir Snær Guðnason))
- Larry Crowne (Dean Tainot (Bryan Cranston))
- Lassie (Sam Carraclough (John Lynch))
- The Last Shot (Joe Devine (Alec Baldwin))
- Leatherface (Hal Hartman (Stephen Dorff))
- Léon: The Professional (1996 TV Asahi edition) (Malky (Peter Appel))
- Lifeforce (2005 TV Asahi edition) (Col. Colin Caine (Peter Firth))
- Little Nicky (Adrian (Rhys Ifans))
- Lonely Hearts (Elmer C. Robinson (John Travolta))
- Mad Dogs (Milo (Billy Zane))
- The Marksman (James "Jim" Hanson (Liam Neeson))
- Mission: Impossible III (Owen Davian (Philip Seymour Hoffman))
- Moulin Rouge! (The Duke of Monroth (Richard Roxburgh))
- Nanny McPhee and the Big Bang (Phil Green (Rhys Ifans))
- Never Die Alone (King David (DMX))
- The Nevers (Inspector Frank Mundi (Ben Chaplin))
- The Newton Boys (Jess Newton (Ethan Hawke))
- A Nightmare on Elm Street (Freddy Krueger (Jackie Earle Haley))
- Nine (Guido Contini (Daniel Day-Lewis))
- Notting Hill (Spike (Rhys Ifans))
- Only Murders in the Building (Sting)
- Oppenheimer (Lewis Strauss (Robert Downey Jr.))
- Out of Reach (Faisal (Matt Schulze))
- Out of Sight (Maurice Miller (Don Cheadle))
- Paddington in Peru (Hunter Cabot (Antonio Banderas))
- The People vs. Larry Flynt (Jimmy Flynt (Brett Harrelson))
- Planet of the Apes (General Thade (Tim Roth))
- Platoon (2003 TV Tokyo edition) (Sergeant Bob Barnes (Tom Berenger))
- The Preacher's Wife (Dudley (Denzel Washington))
- Project A Part II (Awesome Wolf (Yao Lin Chen))
- The Punisher (Howard Saint (John Travolta))
- The Raven (Edgar Allan Poe (John Cusack))
- Ray (Ray Charles (Jamie Foxx))
- Rémi sans famille (Vitalis (Daniel Auteuil))
- The Royal Tenenbaums (Richie Tenenbaum (Luke Wilson))
- Safe House (DI Oliver Vedder (Gary Cargill))
- Salvador (Jesús Irurre (Leonardo Sbaraglia))
- Saw II (Detective Eric Matthews (Donnie Wahlberg))
- Scenes from a Marriage (Jonathan Levy (Oscar Isaac))
- Shang-Chi and the Legend of the Ten Rings (Xu Wenwu (Tony Leung Chiu-wai))
- Solo: A Star Wars Story (Darth Maul (Sam Witwer))
- Snow White and the Huntsman (Beith (Ian McShane))
- Species (Dr. Stephen Arden (Alfred Molina))
- Speed 2: Cruise Control (Officer Alex Shaw (Jason Patric))
- Spy Kids: All the Time in the World (Danger D'Amo / Time Keeper, Tick Tock, Danger's Father, Time Keeper's Henchmen (Jeremy Piven))
- Star Trek: The Motion Picture (Willard Decker (Stephen Collins))
- Sucker Punch (The Wise Man / The General / The Bus Driver (Scott Glenn))
- Surrogates (Thomas "Tom" Greer (Bruce Willis))
- The Taking of Pelham 123 (Ryder / Dennis Ford (John Travolta))
- The Taking of Tiger Mountain (Yang Zirong (Zhang Hanyu))
- Talk to Her (Marco Zuluaga (Darío Grandinetti))
- Thank You for Smoking (Nick Naylor (Aaron Eckhart))
- Timeless (Garcia Flynn (Goran Višnjić))
- Twilight (Reuben Escobar (Giancarlo Esposito))
- Twister (Bill "The Extreme" Harding (Bill Paxton))
- U.S. Marshals (Mark J. Sheridan / Mark Roberts / Mark Warren (Wesley Snipes))
- Under the Tuscan Sun (Martini (Vincent Riotta))
- Universal Soldier: Regeneration (Sergeant Andrew Scott (Dolph Lundgren))
- Vicky Cristina Barcelona (Juan Antonio Gonzalo (Javier Bardem))
- Village of the Damned (1998 TV Asahi edition) (Frank McGowan (Michael Paré))
- A View to a Kill (2006 DVD edition) (Max Zorin (Christopher Walken))
- Watchmen (Rorschach (Jackie Earle Haley))
- Zombieland (Tallahassee (Woody Harrelson))
- Zombieland: Double Tap (Albuquerque (Luke Wilson))

==== Animation ====
- Bolt (Penny's manager)
- Brave (King Fergus)
- Brother Bear (Sitka)
- Coraline (Charlie Jones)
- DC League of Super-Pets (Lex Luthor)
- Finding Nemo (Gill)
- Finding Dory (Gill)
- The Garfield Movie (Vic)
- Guillermo del Toro's Pinocchio (Count Volpe)
- Happy Feet Two (The Mighty Sven)
- The Lego Batman Movie (Lord Voldemort)
- Madagascar: Escape 2 Africa (Makunga)
- Marvel Zombies (Xu Wenwu)
- Missing Link (Sir Lionel Frost)
- Moana 2 (Kele)
- Monsters vs. Aliens (General W.R. Monger)
- Rango (Roadkill)
- Rio (Nico)
- Rio 2 (Nico)
- Rise of the Guardians (Pitch)
- Smurfs (Ken)
- Toy Story 3 (Chatter Telephone)
- Vivo (Andrés)
- Zootopia (Mr. Big)
- Zootopia 2 (Mr. Big)

=== Others ===
- Machi Chūka de Yarouze (BS-TBS, 2019–present), narrator

== Awards ==
Year	Award	Work	Result
2010	36th Kikuta Kazuo Theater Prize for Theater Grand-Prix	Takarazuka Boys, Anna Karenina	Nominated
2018	59th Mainichi Arts Awards	Edo Kaikitan: Mukasari	Won

== See also ==
- List of Japanese actors
