= Mamoru Hosoda =

Japanese filmmaker and animator (born 1967)

- 細田 守
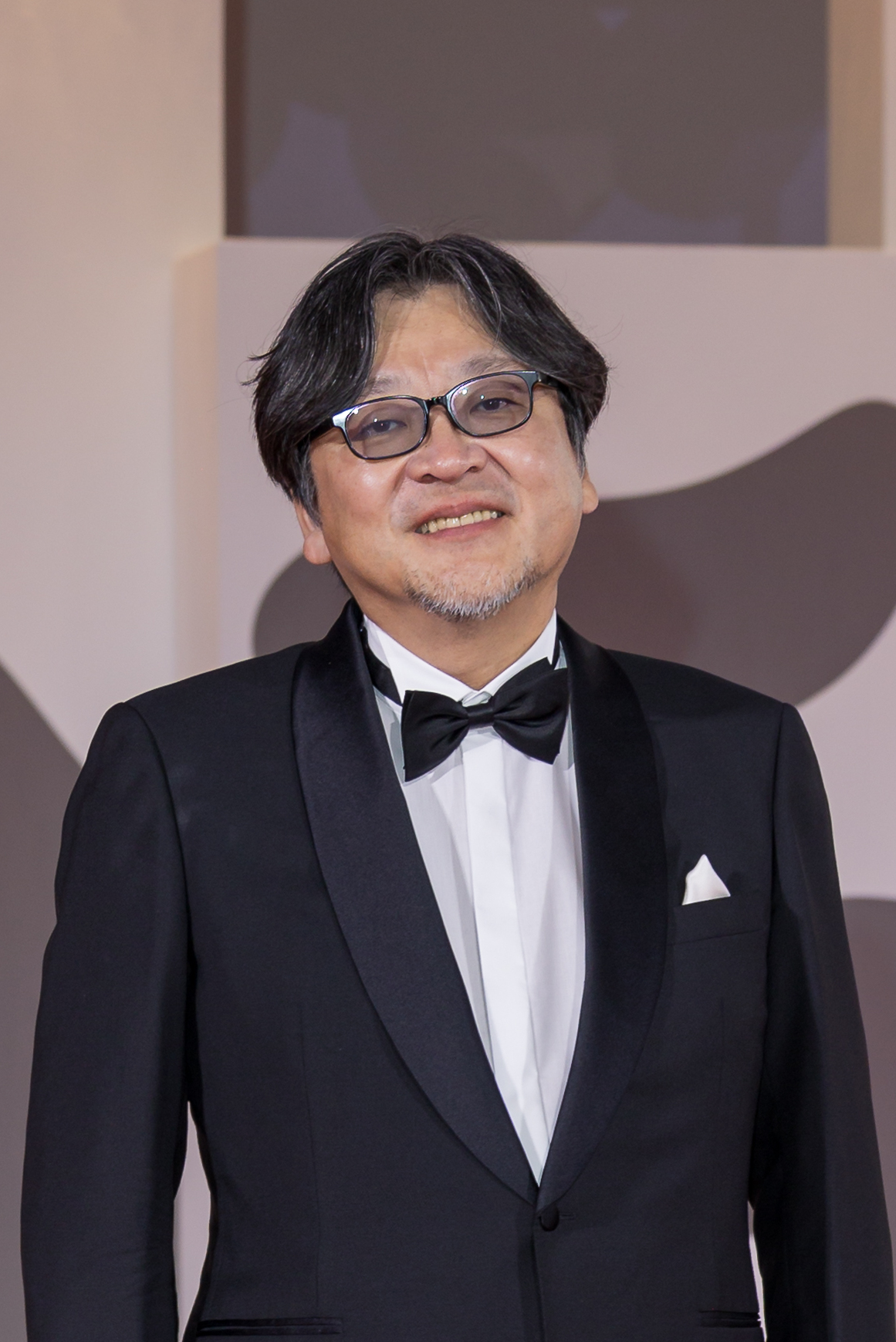
- Hosoda in 2025
- Born: September 19, 1967 (age 59); Kamiichi, Toyama, Japan
- Other names: Hashimoto, Katsuyo (橋本 カツヨ); Sodama, Moruho (遡玉 洩穂); Shirai, Chiaki (白井 千秋)
- Education: Kanazawa College of Art
- Occupations: Animator; film director; screenwriter; storyboard artist; novelist
- Years active: 1991–present
- Employers: Toei Animation (1991–2005); Studio Chizu (2011–present)
- Notable work: Digimon Adventure (1999); Digimon Adventure: Our War Game! (2000); The Girl Who Leapt Through Time (2006); Summer Wars (2009); Wolf Children (2012); The Boy and the Beast (2015); Mirai (2018); Belle (2021); Scarlet (2025)

Mamoru Hosoda (細田 守, Hosoda Mamoru; born September 19, 1967) is a Japanese filmmaker and animator. He is known for the short films that made up Digimon: The Movie (2000), The Girl Who Leapt Through Time (2006) and Summer Wars (2009). He was nominated for an Academy Award in the category Best Animated Feature Film at the 91st Academy Awards for his seventh film Mirai (2018).

== Life and career ==
=== Early life ===
Hosoda was born in Kamiichi, Nakaniikawa District, Toyama, Japan. His father worked as a railway engineer, and his mother was a tailor.

Hosoda was strongly influenced by the animation works he saw in 1979, when he was in the sixth grade, and set his sights on a career related to anime. These were Isao Takahata's Anne of Green Gables, Osamu Dezaki's Aim for the Ace! The Movie, Yoshiyuki Tomino's Mobile Suit Gundam, Rintaro's Galaxy Express 999 The Movie and Hayao Miyazaki's Lupin III: The Castle of Cagliostro. Hosoda described the concentration of works in that one year that would go down in Japanese animation history as like a grand cross (the planets of the Solar System lining up in a cross on the ecliptic). Hosoda had already analyzed the directing methods and screen compositions of Hayao Miyazaki and Rintaro in a collection of essays written by elementary school graduates. Hosoda cited Isao Takahata's Anne of Green Gables as the most influential anime of them all. He says that Takahata, as a "director who does not draw", taught him that drawing is not the only way to dominate a film.

When Hosoda was in junior high school, he saw people his age making animation on NHK Educational TV's independent animation specials, and he started making paper animation using the anime magazine Animage as a reference. Hosoda applied as a first-year high school student for the open call for animators for the Toei Dōga-produced film Shōnen Kenya (1984) and was shortlisted, but withdrew because of mid-term exams.

He majored in oil painting at the Kanazawa College of Art in Ishikawa Prefecture. He then joined the film club at that college and produced live-action films, somewhat distancing himself from animation. Hosoda produced nearly 50 video works: two fiction films were submitted to the Pia Film Festival and the Image Forum Festival, among others, and he also produced other video art works.

In 1989, Hosoda saw an article in Animage recruiting trainees for the production of Studio Ghibli's Only Yesterday and took a recruitment test. Although he did not pass the exam, he received a letter from Hayao Miyazaki saying that he had decided not to hire someone like Hosoda because he thought it would diminish his talent.

=== Toei Animation ===
After graduating from university, Hosoda continued to look for work in the animation industry and contacted a producer with whom he had formed a connection during an open call for animators for Shōnen Kenya, and joined Toei Animation in 1991. He had initially wanted to pursue a directing course, but following that producer's recommendation, he ended up working as an animator for the time being.

Hosoda studied under Takaaki Yamashita, with whom he would later create films, and worked as an animator for six years on various TV series and films, including the film Tōi Umi kara Kita Coo (1993) as assistant animation director.

Hosoda first worked as a director (Note: The term 'director' (episode director) in Toei Animation means not only the position in charge of storyboarding and directing each episode, but also the director who treats each episode as a single work, and the director in other animation studios is called 'series director' in Toei Animation. The series director therefore has as little say as possible in the direction of each episode.) on GeGeGe no Kitarō (series director was Daisuke Nishio). His skills as a director in two Digimon Adventure short films, Digimon Adventure (1999) and Digimon Adventure: Our War Game! (2000), were well received. Despite having directed only a few episodes and having no experience as a series director at this point in his career, he was suddenly chosen as the film director for a big project, a theatre film that was to be made simultaneously with a new TV series. Hosoda responded to the wise decision of producer Hiromi Seki, who saw through his talent, with the high quality of his work, and built an unshakeable reputation.

=== Studio Ghibli ===
Studio Ghibli announced that Hosoda was to direct the film Howl's Moving Castle in September 2001, which was scheduled for a summer 2003 release. The film production started once in 2000.

At the time, Studio Ghibli was looking for a new talent, as momentum was building to appoint someone other than Hayao Miyazaki and Isao Takahata as director. In this context, Nozomu Takahashi, then a producer at Ghibli, was recommended Hosoda by animation researchers and writers. Toshio Suzuki, then president of Ghibli, showed Hosoda the proposal for Howl's Moving Castle, conceived by Hayao Miyazaki, when Hosoda visited Ghibli, and he readily agreed, so Ghibli seconded him from Toei. Suzuki himself was involved in the film as producer for the first year, but when the project ran into difficulties, Takahashi took over and the team went on location scouting in the United Kingdom. In April 2002, the project was stopped by producer Takahashi.

It has not been officially disclosed what kind of trouble there was. Suzuki said that this may be due to the difference in production styles between Toei Animation and Studio Ghibli, or the pressure caused by the presence of Hayao Miyazaki. Regarding the latter in particular, Suzuki says that Miyazaki often made suggestions about the story and pictures, and that Hosoda may have become exhausted by being told different things on different days, or that Hosoda, who admired Miyazaki, may have listened too seriously to Miyazaki's opinions. According to Hosoda, he "was told to make [the movie] similar to how Miyazaki would have made it, but [he] wanted to make [his] own film the way [he] wanted to make it". On the other hand, Hosoda said that Studio Ghibli was producing Spirited Away, directed by Miyazaki, in parallel at the time, which caused the Howl's Moving Castle team led by Hosoda to be understaffed. In a programme on NHK General TV that closely followed him, Hosoda talks about how he did not consult anyone around him, including Hayao Miyazaki and Isao Takahata, about his worries on what direction to take with his work at the time. He said his "cheap pride" got in the way and he became more and more isolated at Ghibli.

=== Return to Toei ===
Hosoda returned to Toei Animation and continued to submit film projects, but none were accepted. There were whispers in the animation industry that Hosoda's career was over. Furthermore, his mother, Hiroko, fell ill, and he wondered whether he should return to his hometown and find another job while caring for her, but in the end he chose to stay on at Toei.

Hosoda has taken on the work assigned to him, including directing TV series and videos, and in 2003 he also directed Superflat Monogram, a PR short film for Louis Vuitton in collaboration with artist Takashi Murakami. In that time, the 40th episode of Ojamajo Doremi Dokkān! he directed in 2002, which was inspired by his experience at Ghibli, marked a turning point for him. After watching episode 40, Masao Maruyama, then president of Madhouse, who had just acquired the film rights to the novel The Girl Who Leapt Through Time, offered Hosoda the chance to direct the film adaptation. Hosoda accepted the offer and pondered the plot of The Girl Who Leapt Through Time while working for Toei.

In 2005, after directing the feature film One Piece: Baron Omatsuri and the Secret Island, Hosoda left Toei.

=== Freelance era ===
In 2006, Hosoda directed The Girl Who Leapt Through Time, his first film since going freelance. Madhouse produced the film and the busy Maruyama left the actual production to his subordinate Yuichiro Saito and Takashi Watanabe, an employee of Kadokawa, which had published the original novel. This was Saito's first producing job, but since then he has been involved in all of Hosoda's films as a producer. When the film was first released, it was planned to be shown in only 21 theaters across Japan, but it gained popularity through word of mouth among audiences and eventually became a hit, with a long run of 40 weeks, over 100 theaters in total, more than 180,000 people in attendance and box-office revenues of approximately 264 million yen. The film was also highly acclaimed for its quality and was invited to participate in numerous film festivals and awards, both in Japan and abroad. The film won Japan Academy Prize for Animation of the Year in 2007.

Hosoda married his long-time girlfriend in August 2006 at the age of 38.

In 2009, Hosoda's first original film Summer Wars was released. It was produced by Madhouse, the same company as the previous film, with Nippon TV as one of the investors and in charge of publicity. Nozomu Takahashi, producer of Howl's Moving Castle, had moved to Nippon TV and Saito approached the company through him. The film was a further hit with 127 screens, an audience of 1.26 million and box-office revenue of 1.65 billion yen. The film again won the Japan Academy Award for Animation of the Year in 2010.

=== Studio Chizu ===
In 2011, Hosoda founded his own animation studio, Studio Chizu, with Saito to produce the film Wolf Children. The film was released in 2012. Hosoda not only directed the film but also wrote the screenplay, which grossed approximately 4.2 billion yen at the box office, significantly more than its predecessor.

The 2015 film The Boy and the Beast was a further success, grossing just over 5.8 billion yen at the box office.

Mirai was nominated for Best Animated Feature Film at the 91st Oscars in 2019. It was the first time a Japanese animated film other than Studio Ghibli had been nominated for the award.

In 2021, the film Belle was released. The film grossed 6.6 billion yen at the box office and became Hosoda's highest-grossing film to date.

== Filmography ==
=== Film ===
No.	Title	Animation studio	Distributor	Release date	Note	Ref.
Feature films
1	One Piece: Baron Omatsuri and the Secret Island	Toei Animation	Toei Company	March 5, 2005	Written by Masahiro Ito	
2	The Girl Who Leapt Through Time	Madhouse	Kadokawa Herald Pictures	July 15, 2006	Written by Satoko Okudera	
3	Summer Wars	Madhouse	Warner Bros. Japan	August 1, 2009	Written by Satoko Okudera	
4	Wolf Children	Studio Chizu	Toho	July 21, 2012	Written by Satoko Okudera	
5	The Boy and the Beast	Studio Chizu	Toho	July 11, 2015	Written by Mamoru Hosoda	
6	Mirai	Studio Chizu	Toho	July 20, 2018	Written by Mamoru Hosoda	
7	Belle	Studio Chizu	Toho	July 16, 2021	Written by Mamoru Hosoda	
8	Scarlet	Studio Chizu	Toho, Sony Pictures	November 21, 2025	Written by Mamoru Hosoda	
Short films
1	Digimon Adventure	Toei Animation	Toei Company	March 6, 1999	Released as part of the Spring 1999 Toei Animation Fair, alongside Yu-Gi-Oh! and Doctor Slump: Arale's Surprise Burn. Written by Reiko Yoshida.	
2	GeGeGe no Kitarō: Kitarō's Ghost Train	Toei Animation	Toei Company	March 20, 1999	A short 3D film released at various events including at Hanayashiki, and re-released as part of the Toei 3D Animation Fair in October 2009.	
3	Digimon Adventure: Our War Game!	Toei Animation	Toei Company	March 4, 2000	Released as part of the Toei Animation Fair (being screened alongside One Piece: The Movie). Written by Reiko Yoshida.	
4	Digimon Adventure 3D: Digimon Grand Prix!	Toei Animation	Toei Company	July 20, 2000	Originally screened at the Time Machine of Dreams theme park attraction at Sanrio Puroland, and re-released as part of the Toei 3D Animation Fair in October 2009. Written by Atsushi Maekawa.	
5	Superflat Monogram	Toei Animation	N/A	2003	Short film with Takashi Murakami	

=== Television ===
No.	Title	Animation studio	Distributor	Release date	Note	Ref.
1	Digimon Adventure	Toei Animation	Toei Company	1999	(episode 21, 1999)	
2	Ojamajo Doremi Dokkān	Toei Animation	TV Asahi	2002	(episode 40, 49)	
3	Ashita no Nadja	Toei Animation	Toei Company	2003	(opening, ending, episodes 5, 12, 26)	
4	One Piece	Toei Animation	Toei Company	2004	(episode 199)	
5	Samurai Champloo	Manglobe	Fuji TV	2004	(opening under the pseudonym Katsuyo Hashimoto)	

=== As key animator ===
- Ashita no Nadja (episode 26)
- Crying Freeman
- Dragon Ball: The Path to Power
- Dragon Ball Z (episode 173)
- Dragon Ball Z: Broly – The Legendary Super Saiyan
- Dragon Ball Z: Broly – Second Coming
- Galaxy Express 999 ~Eternal Fantasy~
- GeGeGe no Kitarō (1996 series, Episode 94, 105, 113)
  - GeGeGe no Kitarō: Dai-Kaijū (Japanese, 1996 film)
- Slam Dunk (episodes 29, 70)
- Sailor Moon Sailor Stars (episode 7)
- Sailor Moon Super S: The Movie
- Yu Yu Hakusho The Movie: Poltergeist Report
