= Wolf Children =

2012 animated film directed by Mamoru Hosoda

- Theatrical release poster

Japanese name
- Kanji: おおかみこどもの雨と雪
Transcriptions
- Revised Hepburn: Ōkami Kodomo no Ame to Yuki
- Directed by: Mamoru Hosoda
- Screenplay by: Satoko Okudera; Mamoru Hosoda
- Story by: Mamoru Hosoda
- Produced by: Yuichiro Saito; Takuya Itō; Takashi Watanabe
- Starring: Aoi Miyazaki; Takao Osawa
- Edited by: Shigeru Nishiyama
- Music by: Masakatsu Takagi
- Production company: Studio Chizu
- Distributed by: Toho
- Release dates: June 25, 2012 (France); July 21, 2012 (Japan)
- Running time: 117 minutes
- Country: Japan
- Language: Japanese
- Box office: $55 million

Wolf Children (Japanese: おおかみこどもの雨と雪, Hepburn: Ōkami Kodomo no Ame to Yuki; lit. 'Wolf Children: Ame and Yuki') is a 2012 Japanese animated drama film directed and co-written by Mamoru Hosoda. The second original feature film directed by Hosoda and the first work written by him, the film stars the voices of Aoi Miyazaki, Takao Osawa, and Haru Kuroki. The story's central theme is "parent and child", depicting 13 years in the life of a young woman, Hana, who falls in love with a werewolf while in college, and following his death must raise the resulting half-werewolf half-human children, Ame and Yuki, who grow and find their own paths in life.

Hosoda established Studio Chizu for production. Yoshiyuki Sadamoto, of Nadia: The Secret of Blue Water (1990) and Neon Genesis Evangelion (1995), designed the characters. Wolf Children had its world premiere in Paris on June 25, 2012, and was released theatrically on July 21, 2012, in Japan. Funimation, then later GKIDS licenses the film for North America and Manga Entertainment, then later Anime Limited handles UK rights.

== Plot ==
In Tokyo, Hana falls in love with an enigmatic man during her second year of college, who eventually reveals himself to be a wolf man. They later have two children, a daughter named Yuki and a son named Ame. Their father is killed in an accident while hunting for food shortly after Ame's birth.

Hana's life as a single mother is difficult: she has to hide the children as they constantly switch between their human and wolf forms, while struggling with exhaustion and their dwindling finances. After she receives noise complaints and a visit from social services who are concerned that the children have not had vaccinations, Hana moves the family to the countryside away from prying neighbors. She works hard to repair a dilapidated house, but struggles to sustain the family on their own crops. With help from a strict old man named Nirasaki, she learns to farm sufficiently and befriends some of the locals.

One day, Ame almost drowns in a river while trying to hunt a crested kingfisher. Yuki rescues him, and Ame becomes more confident in his wolf abilities. Yuki begs her mother to enroll her in a public school, and Hana accepts on the condition that Yuki keeps her wolf nature secret. Yuki soon makes friends at school while Ame is bullied by his school peers. Ame begins to skip school and becomes more interested in the forest and takes lessons from an elderly fox about survival in the wild.

In fourth grade, Yuki's class receives a new transfer student, Sōhei, who realizes something is unusual about her. When he pursues the matter by cornering her, Yuki gets increasingly angry, leading her to transform into a wolf and inadvertently injuring his ear. At the meeting with their parents and teachers, Sōhei claims a wolf attacked him, absolving Yuki of the blame, and the two become friends. Sometime afterwards, Yuki and Ame get into a physical fight following an argument between their respective decision to live as a human or a wolf.

Two years later, the elementary school is let out early due to treacherous weather. As Hana is about to leave to pick up Yuki, Ame disappears into the forest to help his dying fox teacher, and she follows him. Yuki and Sōhei are left alone at school. Yuki reveals her wolf nature to Sōhei and confesses that it was really her who attacked him. He tells her he already knew, and promises to keep her secret.

While searching for Ame, Hana slips and falls off a cliff. She sees a vision of the children's father telling her that Yuki and Ame will find their own paths in life, and that she raised them well. Ame finds Hana and carries her to safety. She awakens to see him fully transform into an adult wolf and run off into the mountains. Realizing he has found his own path, she tearfully but happily accepts his goodbye.

One year later, Yuki leaves home to move into a middle school dormitory. Ame's wolf howls are heard far and wide in the forest. Hana, now living alone, reflects on her life raising her wolf children and feels proud of the way she raised them.

== Voice cast ==
Character	Cast	
Character	Japanese	English
Hana (花)	Aoi Miyazaki	Colleen Clinkenbeard
The Wolfman (狼, Ookami)	Takao Osawa	David Matranga
Yuki (雪)	Haru Kuroki; Momoka Ono (child)	Jad Saxton; Lara Woodhull (child)
Ame (雨)	Yukito Nishii; Amon Kabe (child)	Micah Solusod; Alison Viktorin (child)
Sōhei Fujii (藤井 草平, Fujii Sōhei)	Takuma Hiraoka	Jason Liebrecht
Sōhei's mother (草平の母, Sōhei no haha)	Megumi Hayashibara	Lydia Mackay
Grandpa Nirasaki (韮崎のおじいちゃん, Nirasaki no ojii-chan)	Bunta Sugawara	Jerry Russell
Mr. Nirasaki (韮崎の旦那さん, Nirasaki no danna-san)	Takashi Kobayashi	Kenny Green
Mrs. Nirasaki (韮崎のおばさん, Nirasaki no oba-san)	Tomie Kataoka	Wendy Powell
Tanabe (田辺)	Shota Sometani	Sonny Strait
Hosokawa (細川)	Tadashi Nakamura	R. Bruce Elliott
Yamaoka (山岡)	Tamio Ōki	Bill Flynn
Tendō (天童)	Hajime Inoue	Kent Williams
Kuroda (黒田)	—N/a	Mike McFarland
Horita (堀田)	Kumiko Asō	Jamie Marchi
Uncle Horita	—N/a	Mark Stoddard
Aunt Horita	—N/a	Melinda Wood Allen
Doi (土肥)	Mitsuki Tanimura	Kate Oxley
Uncle Doi	—N/a	Bob Magruder
Aunt Doi	—N/a	Linda Leonard
Shino (信乃)	Rino Kobayashi	Leah Clark
Bunko (文子)	Chika Arakawa	Felecia Angelle
Sōko (荘子)	Fūka Haruna	Alexis Tipton
Keno (毛野)	Mone Kamishiraishi	Kristi Kang
Masashi (仁)	Shunya Kaneko	—N/a
Masanori (礼儀)	Ruiki Satō	—N/a
Tadatomo (忠与)	Tensei Matsuoka	Eric Vale
Radio Announcer (ラジオ・アナウンサー, Rajio anaunsā)	Taichi Masu (Nippon TV announcer)	Jason C. Miller

== Production ==
One of Hosoda's motivations for working on this film was that people around him had started raising children, and he "saw them shining as they became parents." In an interview with Anime! Anime! in February 2013, Hosoda explained why he chose the setting of Wolf Children despite the fact that it is a story about raising a child: "It is generally taken for granted that children are raised and then grow up. But for the actual people involved, it is not natural at all. In order for the audience to share this feeling, I thought it would be good if we all shared an experience that no one else had (raising a werewolf child)."

In an interview with Famitsu, Hosoda said, "I used to take it for granted that people would have children. However, after getting married, I began to realize that raising children in the city is a hardship in terms of the environment, such as public support, and that living in the countryside is not necessarily easy, and that there is a hardship of not having anyone of the same age. I wanted to make a film about such endurance." Human parenting cannot be done in complete isolation, and the reason for choosing wolves as the material for the project was that "wolves are very family-oriented, and they are disciplined animals that have a leader who leads the pack and lives with the whole group in mind."

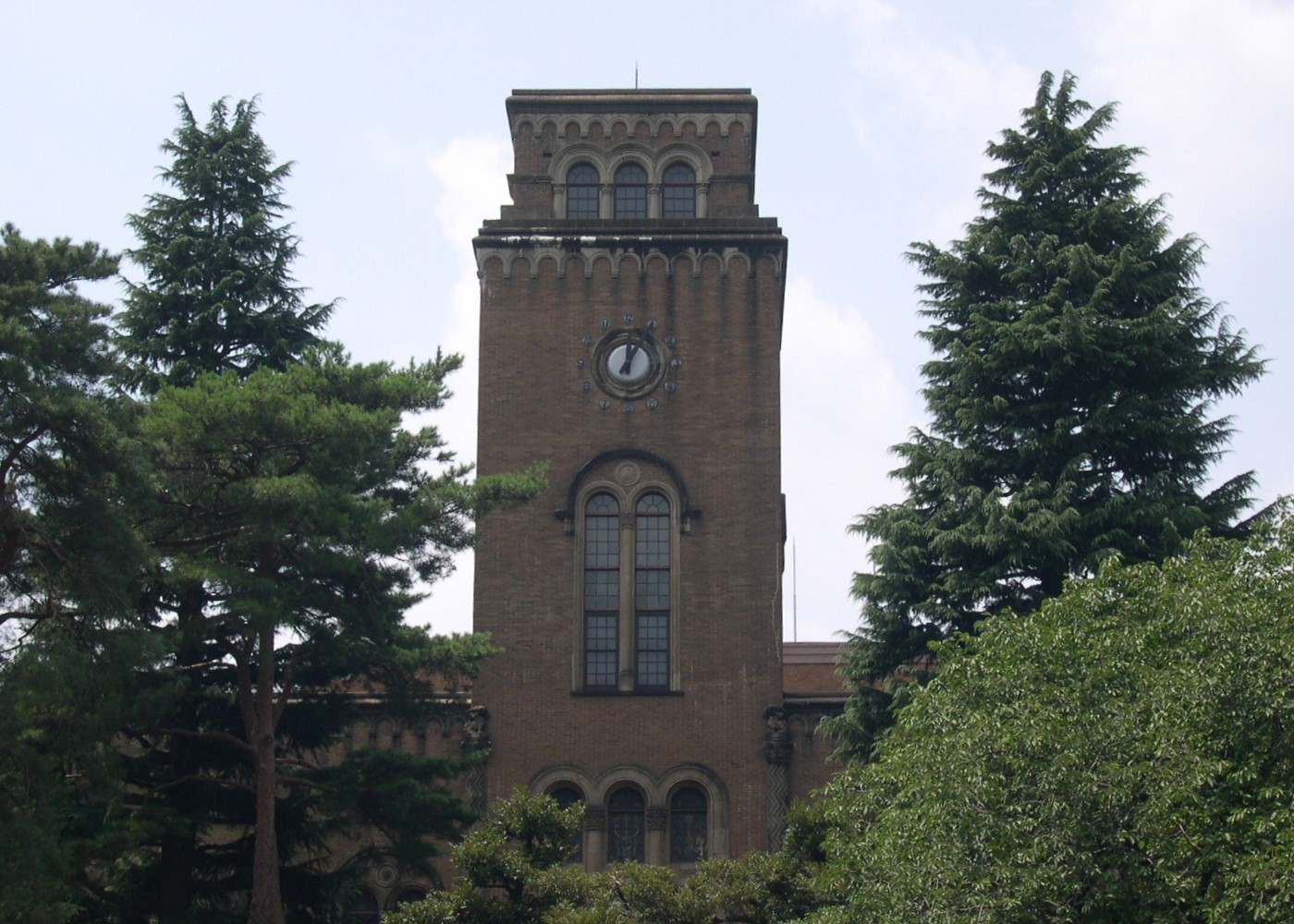
Hitotsubashi University Library's clock tower was one of several model locations referenced during production

The setting of the early part of the story, "a national university on the outskirts of Tokyo," is modeled after Hitotsubashi University in Kunitachi, Tokyo. In addition, the countryside where Hana moves to is modeled after the undeveloped woodland in Toyama Prefecture. The backdrop of the film depicts the landscape of Nakaniikawa District's Kamiichi, Hosoda's hometown, and the neighboring town of Tateyama, and it was divulged that the former mayor of Kamiichi, Naoshi Itō, approached Hosoda to "make a film based on the town". The old house that served as the model for Hana's house was a private home owned by Masao Yamazaki, who lived in Kamiichi. In 2007, five years before the movie was released, Yamazaki died, and the house was considered for demolition, but it was chosen as the model for Hana's house, and after the movie became a big hit, it was opened to the public by the owners (relatives of Yamazaki) and volunteers (as of 2015). The elementary school that Ame and Yuki attended was modeled after Tanaka Elementary School (only the gymnasium is still in existence). The yakitori with sauce that appears in the film is oidare yakitori, a local dish from Ueda, Nagano, where Hosoda's wife's parents live.

== Release ==
At a press conference held on June 18, 2012, the director Mamoru Hosoda announced that Wolf Children would be released in 34 countries and territories. This film's premiere was in France on June 25, 2012, marking its international debut.

It was subsequently released in Japan on July 21, 2012. The film's Blu-ray and DVD release date for Japan was February 20, 2013. The film had a limited release in the United States on September 27, 2013.

Wolf Children was screened at Animefest 2013 in May in the Czech Republic and at Animafest Zagreb 2013 in June in Croatia.

The film received a theatrical one day 4K re-release in Australia on January 15, 2026, alongside The Girl Who Leapt Through Time and Summer Wars by Sugoi Co, followed by Home Entertainment and Digital releases of all 3 films in February 2026 featuring Collector's Edition and Steel-Book Blu-Ray and UHD Blu-ray editions being available for the first time in Australia.

=== Other media ===
In addition to the film, two novelizations and a manga written by Hosoda (with art by Yū (優)) were released by Kadokawa Shoten. The manga was translated into English by Yen Press and was nominated for the Best U.S. Edition of International Material—Asia category at the 2015 Eisner Awards. As tie-ins to the film, a film picture book, an art book, and a storyboard book were released from Kadokawa, Media Pal, and Pia.

- Mamoru Hosoda Pia, Pia, July 10, 2012, ISBN 9784835621203
- Wolf Children Ame and Yuki by Mamoru Hosoda, Kadokawa Tsubasa Bunko, July 15, 2012, ISBN 9784046312488
- Kadokawa Picture Book Wolf Children Ame and Yuki by Mamoru Hosoda, Kadokawa Shoten, July 15, 2012, ISBN 9784041102473
- Wolf Children Ame and Yuki Storyboards Animestyle Archive by Mamoru Hosoda, Media Pal, July 21, 2012, ISBN 9784896102468
- Wolf Children Ame and Yuki Official Book: Hana no Yō ni edited by the Wolf Children Ame and Yuki Production Committee, Kadokawa Shoten, July 23, 2012, ISBN 9784041102480
- Wolf Children Ame and Yuki Artbook edited by the Wolf Children Ame and Yuki Production Committee, Kadokawa Shoten, August 25, 2012, ISBN 9784041102862

No.	Title	Original release date	English release date
	Wolf Children: Ame & Yuki (light novel) by Mamoru Hosoda	June 22, 2012; 978-4-0410-0323-7	May 21, 2019; 978-1-9753-5686-6
	Wolf Children: Ame & Yuki (manga) by Yū (illustrations) and Mamoru Hosoda	July 14, 2012; 978-4-0412-0321-7	March 25, 2014; 978-0-3164-0165-4

== Reception ==
=== Box office ===
Wolf Children was the second-highest-grossing film in Japan on its debut weekend of July 21–22, 2012, beating Pixar's animation Brave, which debuted in Japan on the same weekend. It attracted an audience of 276,326 throughout the weekend, grossing 365.14 million yen. The film subsequently surpassed Hosoda's previous work Summer Wars' gross of around 1.6 billion yen during the weekend of August 12–13, 2012. In total, Wolf Children grossed 4.2 billion yen, making it the fifth-highest-grossing movie in Japan in 2012.

=== Critical reception ===
On the review aggregator website Rotten Tomatoes, 95% of 21 critics' reviews are positive. The website's consensus reads: "Wolf Children is a singularly lyrical anime that blends naturalistic details and nostalgic sentiment to craft a beautifully complex exploration of the joys and trials of parenthood." On Metacritic, the film has a weighted average score of 76 out of 100 based on 8 critics, signifying "generally favorable reviews".

Mark Schilling of The Japan Times gave the film three out of five stars and wrote that "The Miyazaki influence on Hosoda's own work seems obvious, from his cute-but-realistic style to his concern with pressing social issues and the messy emotions of actual human beings". He felt the film was "on the conventional and predictable side ... appealing to Jane Eyre fans in one scene, Call of the Wild fans in the next" and criticized its "well-worn, stereotypical rails".

Thomas Sotinel of Le Monde gave the film five out of five stars. Dave Chua of Mypaper also praised the film's "magnificent understated eye for detail, from the grain of wood on doors to the lovingly captured forest scenes, that help lift the movie above regular animation fare". Chris Michael of The Guardian gave the film four out of five, writing that "telling the story through the eyes of the harried, bereaved but indomitable mother gives this calm, funny, only occasionally schmaltzy family film a maturity Twilight never reached". Kenneth Turan of the Los Angeles Times described it as "an odd story, told in a one-of-a-kind style that feels equal parts sentimental, somber and strange", and felt the English language performances were inappropriately sweet and simplistic. Steven D. Greydanus, writing in the National Catholic Register, named the film a runner-up in its list of the best films of 2013, writing: "Despite brief early problematic content and an ambiguous climactic letdown, the main story is magic".

=== Awards ===
Wolf Children won the 2013 Japan Academy Prize for Animation of the Year, the 2012 Mainichi Film Award for Best Animation Film, and the 2013 Animation of the Year award at TAF. It won two awards at the Oslo Films from the South festival in Norway: the main award, the Silver Mirror, and the audience award. It won an Audience Award at 2013 New York International Children's Film Festival and the 2014 Best Anime Disc award from Home Media Magazine.
