= The Boy and the Beast =

2015 Japanese animated film by Mamoru Hosoda

- Theatrical release poster

Japanese name
- Kanji: バケモノの子
- Literal meaning: The bakemono's child
Transcriptions
- Revised Hepburn: Bakemono no Ko
- Directed by: Mamoru Hosoda
- Written by: Mamoru Hosoda
- Produced by: Yuichiro Saito; Takuya Itō; Atsushi Chiba; Genki Kawamura
- Starring: Shōta Sometani; Aoi Miyazaki; Kōji Yakusho; Suzu Hirose; Kazuhiro Yamaji; Mamoru Miyano; Kappei Yamaguchi; Keishi Nagatsuka; Kumiko Asō; Haru Kuroki; Sumire Morohoshi; Momoka Ōno; Masahiko Tsugawa; Lily Franky; Yo Oizumi
- Edited by: Shigeru Nishiyama
- Music by: Masakatsu Takagi
- Production company: Studio Chizu
- Distributed by: Toho
- Release date: July 11, 2015
- Running time: 120 minutes
- Country: Japan
- Language: Japanese
- Box office: ¥5.85 billion (Japan) $51.4 million (worldwide)

The Boy and the Beast (Japanese: バケモノの子, Hepburn: Bakemono no Ko; lit. 'The bakemono's child') is a 2015 Japanese animated adventure fantasy film written and directed by Mamoru Hosoda. The film stars the voices of Kōji Yakusho, Aoi Miyazaki, Shōta Sometani, Suzu Hirose, Kazuhiro Yamaji, Mamoru Miyano, Kappei Yamaguchi, Keishi Nagatsuka, Kumiko Asō, Haru Kuroki, Sumire Morohoshi, Momoka Ōno, Masahiko Tsugawa, Lily Franky and Yo Oizumi. It was released on July 11, 2015. It won Animation of the Year at the 37th Japan Academy Prizes and grossed ¥5.85 billion at the Japanese box office.

== Plot ==
Nine-year-old Ren has recently lost his mother. With no news of his father and refusing to live with his legal guardians, Ren flees into the streets of Shibuya. Ren steals some food and sleeps in an alley, reminiscing the aftermath of his mother's funeral.

In the Beast Kingdom, the grandmaster has decided he will retire in order to reincarnate as a deity and names two potential successors: the popular Iōzen, who is also the father of two children, and the powerful Kumatetsu, who is lonely and lazy. The Grandmaster suggests that Kumatetsu find a disciple in hopes of inspiring him to succeed him.

While wandering the streets of Tokyo with his makeshift companion, Tatara, Kumatetsu meets Ren and suggests that the boy becomes his disciple. Though Ren is fiercely opposed, he follows Kumatetsu back to the Beast Kingdom out of curiosity but is unable to go back to the human world. As he watches a battle between Iōzen and Kumatetsu, Ren is impressed with Kumatetsu's persistence despite the lack of support from onlookers. When Ren cheers for him, Kumatetsu is easily defeated. However, the Grandmaster declares the actual duel of succession has not come yet.

Taking Ren as a disciple, Kumatetsu gives him a new name, Kyūta. Their initial training sessions go poorly, but Kyūta realizes that he can learn from Kumatetsu by imitating him while performing his household chores. The boy gradually discovers that he can predict his master's movements, and can dodge and move adeptly in combat. They soon begin training together. Eight years later, the teenage Kyūta has become a distinguished kendo practitioner. Moreover, through his relationship with Kyūta, Kumatetsu gains his own following of supporters, including the younger son of Iōzen, Jirōmaru, who wishes to be trained by Kumatetsu.

Kyūta finds a way back to the human world, and befriends Kaede, a young student. In the process, Kyūta finds his father, who had been searching for Ren since he disappeared and wants to catch up. Torn by his double life, he cannot reconcile the resentment he had as Ren and the lack of connections he has as Kyūta. When he rejects both his father and Kumatetsu, he discovers a powerful void within himself that nearly overwhelms him, until Kaede calms him down and gives him a bracelet that has helped her when she becomes anxious.

On the day of the succession duel, Kumatetsu loses confidence without Kyūta's encouragement and is nearly subdued by Iōzen. However, Kyūta has been secretly watching and reveals himself, helping Kumatetsu defeat Iōzen. When Kumatetsu is declared the winner and the new lord, Iōzen's elder son Ichirōhiko is revealed to be a human who had been found on the streets of Tokyo as an infant and adopted by Iōzen. Having developed a vacuum in his heart like Kyūta, unwilling to believe that he is a human and not a beast, Ichirōhiko manifests telekinetic powers and seriously injures Kumatetsu with Iōzen's sword. Kyūta is nearly overtaken by his own emptiness and tries to kill Ichirōhiko, but regains his senses with Kaede's bracelet as Ichirōhiko is consumed by darkness and disappears.

Kyūta decides to leave for the human world to fight Ichirōhiko. When Kaede refuses to leave him, they are attacked by Ichirōhiko, who takes the form of a destructive whale. Unable to hold his own against Ichirōhiko, the young man decides to use the vacuum within himself to absorb his opponent's negative energy and then kill himself, saving everyone else. However, Kumatetsu uses his new privilege as the lord and reincarnates as a deity, taking the form of a sword "to be handled with the heart" in reference to their first training session together. He merges with his pupil's form, filling his empty void within him. Together, the two defeat Ichirōhiko without killing him. Ichirōhiko wakes up surrounded by his adoptive family. Back in Shibuya, Ren talks to Kumatetsu (who now resides inside him) and the two have a heartfelt moment together, with Kumatetsu promising to always be there for Ren and threatening to beat him up from the inside if he wavers again.

In the aftermath, Ren celebrates his victory with Kaede in the Beast Kingdom. After reconciling with his father and himself, Ren decides to permanently live in the human world with Kumatetsu forever residing in his heart.

== Voice cast ==
Character	Cast	
Character	Japanese	English
Kyūta (九太)/Ren (蓮)	Shōta Sometani Aoi Miyazaki^{Y}	Eric Vale Luci Christian^{Y}
Kumatetsu (熊徹)	Kōji Yakusho	John Swasey
Kaede (楓)	Suzu Hirose	Bryn Apprill
Ichirōhiko (一郎彦)	Mamoru Miyano Haru Kuroki^{Y}	Austin Tindle Morgan Berry^{Y}
Tatara (多々良)	Yo Oizumi	Ian Sinclair
Hyakushūbō (百秋坊)	Lily Franky	Alex Organ
Sōshi (宗師)	Masahiko Tsugawa	Steve Powell
Iōzen (猪王山)	Kazuhiro Yamaji	Sean Hennigan
Jirōmaru (二郎丸)	Kappei Yamaguchi Momoka Ono^{Y}	Jessie James Grelle Brittney Karbowski^{Y}
Chiko (チコ)	Sumire Morohoshi	Monica Rial
Ren's Father	Keishi Nagatsuka	Chuck Huber
Ren's Mother	Kumiko Asō	Jessica Cavanagh

== Release ==
The film was released on July 11, 2015, in Japan. The film received its International Premiere at the Toronto International Film Festival and its UK Premiere at the BFI London Film Festival on October 16, 2015.

In December 2014, Gaumont secured international sales outside Asia and theatrical distribution rights in France. The film was released in France on January 13, 2016. Funimation licensed the film for the United States release; it opened in select theaters there on March 4, 2016. It has been licensed by StudioCanal for the UK and Ireland release, Madman Entertainment for the Australian release, and Mongrel Media for the Canadian release.

== Reception ==
=== Box office ===
The film was #1 at the Japanese box office during its opening weekend, replacing Avengers: Age of Ultron, and earning approximately US$5.4 million on 492,000 admissions from 457 screens. In its second weekend, The Boy and the Beast earned $3.89 million, marking a 29.1% decline and dropping to number two, overtaken by Hero 2. The film was Japan's second highest-grossing film in the year 2015 with a total box office gross of (converted from yen) US$48.6 million.

The film ranked #28 at the American box office during its opening weekend on March 4, 2016. As of March 16, 2016, the film has an American box office gross of $474,308.

=== Critical response ===
The review aggregation website Rotten Tomatoes reported that 88% of critics have given the film a positive review based on 69 reviews, with an average rating of 7.3/10. The website's critical consensus reads, "The Boy and the Beast combines familiar parts to create a gripping, beautifully animated adventure with inventive storytelling to match its visual appeal." Metacritic, which uses a weighted average, assigned a score of 65 out of 100 based on 15 critics, indicating "generally favorable reviews".

Mark Schilling of The Japan Times said that the film "has more in common with the "Harry Potter" series than the usual female-centered Miyazaki fantasy" and would later say that the storyline "stays centered on Kyūta's long, vexed struggle to become not only strong, but also whole." Richard Eisenbeis of Kotaku said The Boy and the Beast "is an entertaining coming-of-age adventure on one hand and an excellent thematic exploration on the other. This is one of those films that is perfect for any age group—there's something for everyone in this one." Charles Solomon of the Los Angeles Times said the film "is a bracing tale of two flawed individuals who find the love and discipline they need to assume their rightful places in their respective worlds." Peter Debruge of Variety called it "an action-packed buddy movie that strategically combines several of Japanese fans' favorite ingredients: conflicted teens, supernatural creatures and epic battles." Peter Keough of The Boston Globe gave the film 2.5 out of 4 stars and wrote that Hosoda "does know how to mix an eclectic array of film plots and concepts into a mish-mash that seems original." Pat Padua of The Washington Post wrote, "But it is the world of man, not beast, that makes this coming-of-age movie most touching."

While popular in Japan, in the west the film has a more mixed reaction. Andy Webster of The New York Times was more critical of the film, saying "Mr. Hosoda is skilled with fight scenes, and his settings – the pastel-hued Jūtengai and the drab Shibuya, evoked at times with surveillance-camera perspectives and crowd-paranoia angles – are impressive. But the characterizations and conflicts here are strictly generic." Sherilyn Connelly of The Village Voice said that the film "works with many common anime tropes but doesn't find anything new to say about them." Marc Savlov of The Austin Chronicle gave the film 2.5 out of 5 stars and said "A huge success in Japan, this thrilling, if overlong, epic from director Mamoru Hosoda (Wolf Children, Summer Wars) is part Karate Kid and part Japanese folklore." Jacob Chapman of Anime News Network had a mixed response to the film and said "The Boy and The Beast is the kind of movie you put on to please a kid with its loudness and color, but promptly leave the room to do something else.
