= Yuichiro Saito =

Japanese film producer

Yuichiro Saito (齋藤優一郎, Saitō Yūichirō; born November 5, 1976) is a Japanese film producer. He is the founder and current president of Studio Chizu.

Saito studied in the US. In 1999, he joined the animation studio Madhouse, where he participated in several animation projects led by Masao Maruyama.

In 2004, Saito met Mamoru Hosoda, eight years before they founded Studio Chizu. They worked together in the opening of Shinichiro Watanabe’s Samurai Champloo (2004). Saito produced Hosoda's films The Girl Who Leapt Through Time (2006) and Summer Wars (2009). In 2011, Saito left Madhouse and joined Hosoda to found Studio Chizu.

Saito has been nominated for Best Animated Feature Film APSA with Summer Wars, Wolf Children, and Mirai. Saito was also nominated for the 91st Oscars Award in the Best Animated Film category with Hosada's film Mirai.

== Films ==
- The Girl Who Leapt Through Time (2006)
- Batman: Gotham Knight (2008) (animation producer in segment "In Darkness Dwells")
- Summer Wars (2009)
- Wolf Children (2012)
- The Boy and the Beast (2015)
- Mirai (2018)
- Belle (2021)
- Scarlet (2025)
