= Japan Academy Film Prize for Animation of the Year =

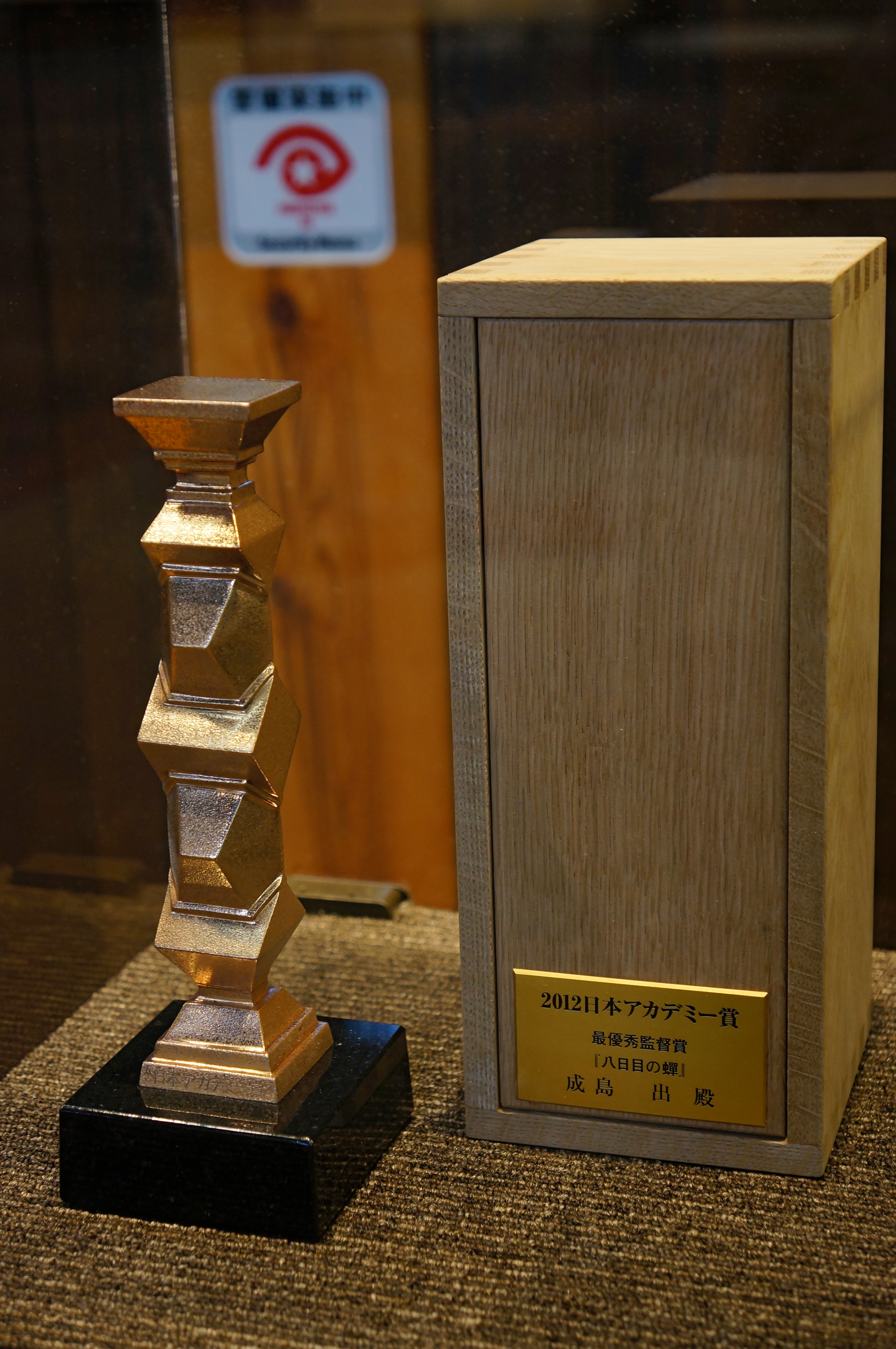
- Awarded for: Excellence in animation films of Japan
- Country: Japan
- Presented by: Japan Academy Film Prize Association
- First award: 2007
- Website: http://www.japan-academy-prize.jp/

The Animation of the Year (アニメーション作品賞) of the Japan Academy Film Prize is one of the annual Awards given by the Japan Academy Film Prize Association.

== History ==
Although the Japan Academy Film Prize has been awarded annually since 1978 to Japanese films, animation films were disregarded in the early years of the Prize. Although animated films have included top grossing Japanese films of the year, such as Doraemon (1980, 1981, 1983, 1984), Studio Ghibli's Kiki's Delivery Service (1989), Only Yesterday (1991), Porco Rosso (1992), Pom Poko (1994), and Whisper of the Heart (1995)., no animated film received a nomination for a Japan Academy Film Prize during those years. This was notably different from other major Japanese film awards, such as the Mainichi Film Award and Kinema Junpo, which both awarded Picture of the Year to My Neighbor Totoro in 1988.

In 1990, the Japan Academy Film Prize Association gave a Special Award to Kiki's Delivery Service at the 13th the Japan Academy Film Prize, and again in 1995 to Takahata's Pom Poko. However, there were still no nominations for these animated box office hits.

But in 1998, the Japan Academy Film Prize Association's attitude toward animated films changed with the hugely successful Princess Mononoke, the highest box-office record ever in the history of Japanese cinema, which dominated the other major film prizes (See: Awards). As a result, at the 21st Japan Academy Film Prize that year, Studio Ghibli's Princess Mononoke became the first-ever animation film to be nominated for, and win the Japan Academy Film Prize Picture of the Year. Yoshiyuki Tomino, famed for Gundam, mentioned it: "A hole that Hayao Miyazaki made spending ten years".

In 2002, at the 25th Japan Academy Film Prize, another animated film by Hayao Miyazaki and Studio Ghibli, Spirited Away, was again nominated and won the Picture of the Year.

In 2007, the Japan Academy Film Prize followed the American Academy Awards, which instituted the Academy Award for Best Animated Feature in 2002, by creating the Japan Academy Film Prize for Animation of the Year. Only one film is awarded Best Animation of the Year (最優秀アニメーション作品賞), but all five nominees are recognized by the association with the awarding of Excellent Animation of the Year (優秀アニメーション作品).

== List of winners and nominees ==
Studio Ghibli with 5 films has the most awards as a studio while Studio Chizu, Madhouse & Ufotable feature prominently. Only Demon Slayer: Kimetsu no Yaiba has ever won the award twice and Detective Conan is the most nominated franchise with 14 nominations while Doraemon, One Piece, Evangelion, Dragon Ball & Lupin III feature prominently.

Year	Best Animation of the Year	Excellent Animation of the Year	Ref
2007	The Girl Who Leapt Through Time	Arashi no Yoru Ni; Tales from Earthsea; Brave Story; Detective Conan: The Private Eyes' Requiem	
2008	Tekkon Kinkreet	Evangelion: 1.0 You Are (Not) Alone; Summer Days with Coo; Piano no Mori; Detective Conan: Jolly Roger in the Deep Azure	
2009	Ponyo	Doraemon: Nobita and the Green Giant Legend 2008; The Sky Crawlers; Detective Conan: Full Score of Fear; One Piece - The Movie: Episode of Chopper Plus: Bloom in the Winter, Miracle Sakura	
2010	Summer Wars	Detective Conan: The Raven Chaser; Doraemon: The New Record of Nobita: Spaceblazer; Evangelion: 2.0 You Can (Not) Advance; Oblivion Island: Haruka and the Magic Mirror	
2011	The Secret World of Arrietty	Detective Conan: The Lost Ship in the Sky; Colorful; Doraemon: Nobita's Great Battle of the Mermaid King; One Piece Film: Strong World	
2012	From Up on Poppy Hill	K-On! Movie; Buddha; Tōfu-kozō; Detective Conan: Quarter of Silence	
2013	Wolf Children	Evangelion: 3.0 You Can (Not) Redo; Friends: Naki on the Monster Island; A Letter to Momo; One Piece Film: Z	
2014	The Wind Rises	The Tale of Princess Kaguya; Puella Magi Madoka Magica the Movie: Rebellion; Space Pirate Captain Harlock; Lupin the 3rd vs. Detective Conan: The Movie	
2015	Stand by Me Doraemon	When Marnie Was There; Giovanni's Island; Detective Conan: Dimensional Sniper; Buddha 2: Tezuka Osamu no Buddha - Owarinaki Tabi	
2016	The Boy and the Beast	The Anthem of the Heart; Miss Hokusai; Dragon Ball Z: Resurrection 'F'; Love Live! The School Idol Movie	
2017	In This Corner of the World	Your Name; A Silent Voice; Rudolf the Black Cat; One Piece Film: Gold	
2018	The Night Is Short, Walk On Girl	Fireworks, Should We See It from the Side or the Bottom?; Napping Princess; Mary and the Witch's Flower; Detective Conan: Crimson Love Letter	
2019	Mirai	Dragon Ball Super: Broly; Penguin Highway; Detective Conan: Zero the Enforcer; Okko's Inn	
2020	Weathering with You	Her Blue Sky; Detective Conan: The Fist of Blue Sapphire; Lupin III: The First; One Piece: Stampede	
2021	Demon Slayer: Kimetsu no Yaiba – The Movie: Mugen Train	Violet Evergarden: The Movie; Poupelle of Chimney Town; Josee, The Tiger and The Fish; Stand by Me Doraemon 2	
2022	Evangelion: 3.0+1.0 Thrice Upon a Time	Sing a Bit of Harmony; Fortune Favors Lady Nikuko; Jujutsu Kaisen 0; Belle	
2023	The First Slam Dunk	Inu-Oh; Lonely Castle in the Mirror; One Piece Film: Red; Suzume	
2024	The Boy and the Heron	Birth of Kitarō: The Mystery of GeGeGe; Totto-Chan: The Little Girl at the Window; Detective Conan: Black Iron Submarine; Blue Giant	
2025	Look Back	Give It All; Mobile Suit Gundam SEED Freedom; Haikyu!! The Dumpster Battle; Detective Conan: The Million-dollar Pentagram	
2026	Demon Slayer: Kimetsu no Yaiba – The Movie: Infinity Castle	Chainsaw Man – The Movie: Reze Arc; 100 Meters; Peleliu: Guernica of Paradise; Detective Conan: One-eyed Flashback	

== See also ==
- List of animation awards
