= Grand cross (astrology) =

4 planets are separated by 90° each

In astrology, a Grand Cross is said to occur when four planets are all separated from each other by Square aspects (90 degrees apart). A Grand Cross can also be viewed as two oppositions (180 degrees apart) separated from each other by a square. In a Grand Cross, there is one planet in each astrological element (fire, earth, air and water) but all the planets are in signs of the same modality or quality.

Because all the aspects in a Grand Cross are considered difficult aspects, the Grand Cross is seen as a source of extreme tension whereby various aspects of the personality (represented by the planets) are working at cross purposes that serve to nullify each other. This pulls the native in many directions, ultimately leading to indecisiveness and an inability to produce concrete achievements. It is said to take extraordinary effort to overcome the conflicts in a Grand Cross.

An example of a Grand Cross would be with Saturn at 15° Virgo, Uranus at 15° Sagittarius, Neptune at 15° Gemini and Pluto at 15° Pisces. This is a mutable Grand Cross, which is said to be especially difficult with respect to the problem of maintaining focus in communication. A cardinal Grand Cross is said to cause a particular difficulty in accomplishing goals because the individual wants to accomplish everything at the same time. As a result, this can cause problems in retaining the concentration needed to accomplish tasks. A fixed Grand Cross is said to lead to a person who is well organized but does not know where to direct their talents. Consequently, those with a fixed grand cross tend to be stuck in the same place.

People with many squares in their horoscope, however, if they work hard enough at overcoming the conflicts thus involved, are said to be able to achieve remarkable personal growth and self-fulfillment.

== T-Square ==
When one of the four signs of any modality or quality does not contain any planet - or only contains planets that would be out of orb for a Grand Cross - then a T-Square is said to be formed.

The energy of T-Square is similar to a Grand Cross, but it is much weaker because it involves only three planets; in which two of them form an opposition and a square with the third. Due to lesser energy emitted by the T-Square, individuals with this planetary configuration feel that there is something lacking and therefore have to supply what they think is lacking for better integration of their personality. Filling the gap posed by the T-Square in their personal makeup is the solution to take control of the stressful energies of this aspect and channel them into constructive use. Many successful professionals and otherwise outstanding people often have this configuration in their chart.

One particular example of a Cross, which was not a Grand Cross, came during the summer of 2010 (July 10), when Pluto (in Capricorn), Uranus and Jupiter (in Aries) and the Moon (in Gemini moving into Cancer) were at 0-3° Capricorn, Aries and Cancer, respectively, with Saturn being out of mode at 29 Virgo. This was assumed by astrologers studying mundane astrology that it would be a time with many great challenges and dramatic changes. As the Moon moved out of orb, this Cross quickly (within a day) became a T-Square. This aspect resembled a T-Square that occurred during the 1930s.
