= School Ghost Stories (disambiguation) =

School ghost stories (Gakkō no Kaidan in Japanese) may refer to:

- Gakkō no Kaidan (novel series), a series of Japanese light novels by Takaaki Kaima
- School Ghost Stories or Haunted School, a 1995 Japanese horror film and subsequent franchise, based on books by Toru Tsunemitsu
  - Gakkō no Kaidan 2, a 1996 sequel film
  - School Ghost Stories 3, a 1997 sequel film
  - Gakkō no Kaidan 4, a 1999 sequel film
  - Ghost Stories (Japanese TV series), a 2000 anime series
- Gakkō no Kaidan (2015 TV series), a Japanese drama series starring Suzu Hirose, unrelated to the horror franchise

== See also ==
- Haunted School (disambiguation)
- School Spirits (disambiguation)
- Kaidan (disambiguation)
- "A School Story", a short story by M. R. James
