= List of Toho films =

Toho's original opening logo

This is a list of films produced by and distributed by Toho Co., Ltd. and films by its predecessors (such as J.O. Studios) and subsidiaries (such as Toho Studios).

== 1930s ==
Film	Release date	Notes
Toy Box Series	1933	One of the first films to be produced and distributed by J.O. Studio, a predecessor of Toho Co., Ltd.
Ugokie Kori no Tatehiki	1933	
Three Sisters with Maiden Hearts	1935	Produced and distributed by Photo Chemical Laboratory (P.C.L.)., a predecessor of Toho Co., Ltd.
Princess Kaguya	1935	Produced by J.O. Studios, a predecessor of Toho Co., Ltd.
Tama o nagero	1935	
Enoken's Ten Millions	1936	The second film to be produced by P.C.L. a predecessor of Toho; the film would also later make a sequel
Enoken's Ten Millions sequel	1936	
Tokyo Rhapsody	1936	
Humanity and Paper Balloons	1937	
Avalanche	1937	
A Husband Chastity	1937	
Tojuro's Love	1938	
Enoken's Shrewd Period	1939	
Chushingura I	1939	
Chushingura II	1939	the sequel to Chushingura I

== 1940s ==
Film	Release date	Notes
Song of Kunya	1940	Directed by Motoyoshi Oda
Enoken Has His Hair Cropped	1940	
Songoku	1940	Shown in two parts, 72 minutes and 67 minutes respectively
Hideko the Bus-Conductor	1941	
Horse	1941	
The War at Sea from Hawaii to Malaya	1942	Also known as Hawai Mare oki kaisen
Sanshiro Sugata	1943	AKA Sugata Sanshirō, AKA Judo Saga; directed by Akira Kurosawa
The Most Beautiful	1944	AKA Ichiban utsukushiku; directed by Akira Kurosawa
Sanshiro Sugata Part II	1945	the sequel to Sanshiro Sugata; directed by Akira Kurosawa
The Men Who Tread on the Tiger's Tail	1945	directed by Akira Kurosawa
No Regrets for Our Youth	1946	AKA Waga seishun ni kuinashi; directed by Akira Kurosawa
Those Who Make Tomorrow	1946	
One Wonderful Sunday	1947	directed by Akira Kurosawa
Snow Trail	1947	The first film composed by Akira Ifukube who would later compose many of the Godzilla films and other Toho kaiju films years later; also featured Toshirō Mifune's first movie role.
Drunken Angel	1948	starring Toshiro Mifune
Lady from Hell	1949	
Stray Dog	1949	AKA Nora Inu; directed by Akira Kurosawa; starring Toshiro Mifune

== 1950s ==
Film	Release date	Notes
The Lady of Musashino	1951	AKA Musashino-Fujin
Repast	1951	AKA Meshi, a post-World War II drama
Ikiru	1952	AKA To Live; AKA Doomed
Eagle of the Pacific	1953	First major collaboration between director Ishirō Honda and special effects director Eiji Tsuburaya
Seven Samurai	1954	AKA Shichinin no Samurai; it was the first of two films that almost caused Toho to go into bankruptcy, with the other one being Godzilla; however, both films became massive hits and box office successes
Godzilla	1954	AKA Gojira; directed by Ishirō Honda and featuring special effects by Eiji Tsuburaya; the first Godzilla film made by Toho, which became Toho's longest-running film series; Godzilla was released in the US in 1956, dubbed in English and heavily re-edited into the film known as Godzilla: King of the Monsters!
The Invisible Man	1954	AKA Tomei ningen; AKA The Invisible Avenger; never dubbed in English; black and white/ full screen.
Sound of the Mountain	1954	AKA Yama no Oto
Late Chrysanthemums	1954	AKA Bangiku
Floating Clouds	1955	AKA Ukigumo
Godzilla Raids Again	1955	AKA Gojira no gyakushu (Godzilla's Counterattack); shot in black and white/full screen; the first appearance of the monster Anguirus; a rushed sequel to the previous film, Godzilla; released in the U.S. as Gigantis the Fire Monster; the series was put on hiatus after this film for seven years until 1962's King Kong vs. Godzilla.
Half Human	1955	AKA Jujin yukiotoko (Monster Snowman); the original Japanese version was banned due to the depiction of the Ainu people in a negative light; the re-edited American version, featuring added footage of John Carradine, was only released in 1958 and is the only version available on home video worldwide.
I Live in Fear	1955	AKA Ikimono no kiroku; AKA Record of a Living Being, AKA What the Birds Knew (directed by Akira Kurosawa)
Sudden Rain	1956	AKA Shūu
A Wife's Heart	1956	AKA Tsuma no kokoro
Vampire Moth	1956	AKA Kyuketsuki-ga; a non-supernatural murder mystery
Sazae-san	1956	A comedy/drama based on a manga (comic book)
The Legend of the White Serpent (film)	1956	AKA Byaku fugin no yoren, AKA The Bewitched Love of Madame Pai; released in the US in 1965
Flowing	1956	AKA Nagareru
Rodan	1956	AKA Sora no daikaiju Radon (The Sky's Giant Monsters: Rodan); the first Toho film made in color; the first appearances of both Rodan and the Meganurons
Untamed	1957	AKA Arakure
The Secret Scrolls Part One	1957	AKA Yagyu bugeicho, AKA Yagyu Secret Scrolls; released subtitled in the US in 1967
Throne of Blood	1957	AKA Kumonosu-djo (Cobweb Castle); AKA Castle of the Spider's Web (directed by Akira Kurosawa)
Ikiteiru koheiji (The Living Koheiji)	1957	A musical
Knockout Drops	1957	AKA Tokyo no tekisasujin, directed by Motoyoshi Oda
The Lower Depths	1957	AKA Donzoko; directed by Akira Kurosawa
The Mysterians	1957	AKA Chikyu boeigun (Earth Defense Force); first appearance of the giant robot Moguera
The Secret Scrolls: Part Two	1958	AKA Ninjutsu; released subtitled in the US in 1968
The H-Man	1958	AKA Bijo To Ekatai-Ningen (Beauty and the Liquid People)
The Hidden Fortress	1958	AKA Kakushi toride no san akunin, directed by Akira Kurosawa
The Snowy Heron	1958	AKA Shirasagi
Varan	1958	AKA Daikaiju Baran (Giant Monster Baran); the first appearance of the monster Varan; the film was heavily re-edited for its American version and re-titled Varan the Unbelievable, similar to Godzilla: King of the Monsters! (the American version of Godzilla), Godzilla Raids Again, Half Human, King Kong vs. Godzilla and Daiei Film's Gamera, the Giant Monster
Monkey Sun	1959	AKA Sungoku: The Road to the West (special effects by Eiji Tsuburaya)
Ishimatsu Travels with Ghosts	1959	AKA Moro no Ichimatsu yurei dochu
The Birth of Japan (Nippon Tanjo)	1959	Shown in Japan in 1959 as Nippon Tanjo (Birth of Japan) at 182 minutes; later released in the United States in December, 1960 as The Three Treasures, edited down to only 112 minutes; AKA Age of the Gods
Battle in Outer Space	1959	AKA Uchū daisensō (Great War in Space)

== 1960s ==
Film	Release date	Notes
The Secret of the Telegian	1960	AKA Denso ningen (The Electrically-Transmitted Man)
The Bad Sleep Well	1960	AKA Warui yatsu hodo yoku nemuru; directed by Akira Kurosawa
When a Woman Ascends the Stairs	1960	AKA Onna ga kaidan o agaru toki
Storm Over the Pacific	1960	AKA Hawai Middouei daikaikusen: Taiheiyo no arashi/ Hawaii-Midway Battle of the Sea and Sky: Storm in the Pacific Ocean (running 118 minutes); Later released in 1961 in the United States in a dubbed and abridged, 98-minute version produced by Hugo Grimaldi under the title I Bombed Pearl Harbor
The Approach of Autumn	1960	AKA Aki tachinu, AKA Autumn Has Already Started
The Human Vapor	1960	AKA Gasu ningen dai ichigo (Gas Human Being #1)
The Big Wave	1961	The company's first Japanese-American co-production; directed by Tad Danielewski; never officially released in Japan
Mothra	1961	AKA Mosura; the first appearance of Mothra, who would go on to reappear in many later Godzilla films, as well as a trilogy of films in the 1990s (Rebirth of Mothra, Rebirth of Mothra II and Rebirth of Mothra III).
Yojimbo	1961	directed by Akira Kurosawa
The Last War	1961	AKA Sekai daisenso (The Great World War)
The End of Summer	1961	AKA Kohayagawa-ke no aki
My Friend Death	1961	AKA Yurei Hanjo-ki; filmed in black and white/Scope
Sanjuro	1962	AKA Tsubaki Sanjūrō; directed by Akira Kurosawa
The Youth and His Amulet	1962	AKA Gen and Fudo-Myoh
Gorath	1962	AKA Yosei Gorasu (Suspicious Star Gorath); the walrus-monster in the film, Maguma, was removed entirely from the American version
King Kong vs. Godzilla	1962	AKA Kingu Kongu tai Gojira; the highest grossing Godzilla film ever (and the first one made in color); featured King Kong and the first appearance of the Oodako (a giant octopus).
Rorentsu o· Ruisu no shōgai	1962	Biopic about Lorenzo Ruiz, patron saint of the Philippines
A Wanderer's Notebook	1962	AKA Hourou-ki, AKA Her Lonely Lane
High and Low	1963	AKA Tengoku to Jigoku (Heaven and Hell); directed by Akira Kurosawa
Legacy of the 500,000	1963	Directed by Toshiro Mifune in his sole directorial credit
Matango	1963	AKA Attack of the Mushroom People
The Lost World of Sinbad	1963	AKA Dai tozoku (The Great Thief); AKA Samurai Pirate
Atragon	1963	AKA Kaitei gunkan (Undersea Battleship); The first appearance of the snake-monster Manda, who would later reappear in Destroy All Monsters.
Yearning	1964	AKA Midareru
Whirlwind	1964	AKA Dai tatsumaki
Woman in the Dunes	1964	AKA Suna no Onna (The Sand Woman)
Onibaba	1964	AKA The Demon Hag; AKA The Witch; AKA Devil Woman; B&W/TohoScope
Mothra vs. Godzilla	1964	AKA Godzilla vs. The Thing, Godzilla vs. Mothra; the last Showa Godzilla film where Godzilla was the villain
Kwaidan	1964	AKA Ghost Story; an anthology of four short stories (The Black Hair, Woman of the Snow, Hoichi the Earless and In a Cup of Tea)
Shirasagi	1964	AKA The Snowy Heron
Dogora (AKA Dagora, the Space Monster)	1964	AKA Uchu daikaiju Dogora (Giant Space Monster Dogora); the first appearance of Dogora
Ghidorah, the Three-Headed Monster	1964	AKA San daikaiju chikyu saidai no kessen (Three Giant Monsters: The Greatest Battle on Earth); the first appearance of King Ghidorah; also featured Rodan and Mothra
Kokusai himitsu keisatsu: Kayaku no taru	1964	This and its successor were edited together to form the English-dubbed film What's Up, Tiger Lily?
None but the Brave	1965	Japanese-American co-production directed by and starring Frank Sinatra and featuring special effects by Eiji Tsuburaya
Kokusai himitsu keisatsu: Kagi no kagi	1965	This and its predecessor were edited together to form the English-dubbed film What's Up, Tiger Lily?
Tokyo Olympiad	1965	An official film of 1964 Summer Olympics.
Illusion of Blood	1965	AKA Yotsuya Kaidan (Yotsuya Ghost Story)
Red Beard	1965	AKA Akahige; directed by Akira Kurosawa
Frankenstein Conquers the World	1965	AKA Furankenshutain tai chitei kaiju Baragon (Frankenstein vs. Subterranean Monster Baragon); the first appearances of both Frankenstein (the Toho version) and Baragon, the latter of whom would later reappear in Destroy All Monsters; alternate ending was filmed which again featured the Oodako (a giant octopus), but it was later edited out of the international version; see sequel called The War of the Gargantuas.
Invasion of Astro-Monster (AKA Monster Zero, Godzilla vs. Monster Zero)	1965	AKA Kaiju daisenso (The Great Monster War); this was the 6th Godzilla film; the alien Xilians would later be used again in Godzilla: Final Wars.
We Will Remember	1965	AKA Senjo ni nagareru uta; a war film
The Face of Another	1966	AKA Tanin no kao (Face of a Stranger)
Silence Has No Wings	1966	AKA Tobenai Chinmoko
The War of the Gargantuas	1966	AKA Furankenshutain no kaiju – Sanda tai Gaira (Frankenstein's Monsters – Sanda vs. Gaira); the sequel to Frankenstein Conquers the World; the first appearances of both Sanda and Gaira
Adventures of Takla Makan	1966	AKA Kiganjo no boken; AKA Adventure in Kigan Castle, B&W/TohoScope
Ebirah, Horror of the Deep (AKA Godzilla vs. the Sea Monster)	1966	AKA Gojira, Ebirah, Mosura: Nankai no Daikettō (Godzilla, Ebirah, Mothra: Big Duel in the South Seas); the first Godzilla film in which the main setting is a barren South Pacific island rather than a city; first appearance of the giant lobster Ebirah; originally meant to be a King Kong film made in collaboration with Rankin/Bass Productions, but Rankin/Bass dropped out and Toho turned it into a Godzilla film instead
The Sword of Doom	1966	AKA Dai-bosatsu Tōge
The Killing Bottle	1967	AKA Zettai zetsumei; a crime drama starring Nick Adams
Tenamonya: Ghost Journey	1967	AKA Tenamonya yurei dochu (Ghost of Two Travelers at Tenamonya)
Samurai Rebellion	1967	AKA Jōi-uchi: Hairyō tsuma shimatsu
King Kong Escapes	1967	AKA Kingu Kongu no gyakushu (King Kong's Counterattack); the second King Kong film made by Toho, based on an animated TV show made by Rankin/Bass in collaboration with Toei known as The King Kong Show; also features Gorosaurus and Mechani-Kong
Son of Godzilla	1967	AKA Kaiju shima no kessen: Gojira no musuko (Monster Island's Decisive Battle: Son of Godzilla); first appearances of Minilla, Kamacuras, and Kumonga
Kuroneko	1968	AKA The Black Cat; black and white/TohoScope
Destroy All Monsters	1968	AKA Kaiju soshingeki (March of the Monsters); features Godzilla, Minilla, Rodan, Mothra, Anguirus, Kumonga, Manda, Varan, Gorosaurus, Baragon and King Ghidorah
Latitude Zero	1969	AKA Ido zero dai sakusen (Latitude Zero: Big Military Operation)
Portrait of Hell	1969	AKA Jigokuhen, AKA A Story in Hell
All Monsters Attack	1969	AKA Gojira, Minilla, Gabara: Oru kaiju daishingeki (Godzilla, Minilla, Gabara: All Monsters Attack); AKA Godzilla's Revenge; the 10th Godzilla film; this was the first film in the series geared toward children; the first appearance of Gabara

== 1970s ==
Film	Release date	Notes
The Vampire Doll	1970	AKA Chi o suu ningyo (Bloodthirsty Doll); AKA Night of the Vampire; released in U.S. subtitled only
Terror in the Streets	1970	AKA Akuma ga yondeiru/ The Devil is Calling; features an invisible man; released on a double feature with The Vampire Doll
Space Amoeba (AKA Yog, Monster from Space)	1970	AKA Gezora, Ganimes, Kamoebas: Kessen nankai no daikaiju (Gezora, Ganimes, Kamoebas: Decisive Battle! Giant Monsters of the South Seas) features three monsters named Gezora, Ganimes and Kamoebas
Dodes'ka-den	1970	Titles translates as Clickety-Clack; directed by Akira Kurosawa (his first color film)
Inn of Evil	1971	AKA Inochi bonifuro
To Love Again	1971	AKA Ai futatabi
Godzilla vs. Hedorah (AKA Godzilla vs. the Smog Monster)	1971	AKA Gojira tai Hedora; the first appearance of Hedorah
The Battle of Okinawa	1971	AKA Gekido no showashi: Okinawa kessen
Lake of Dracula	1971	AKA Chi o suu me (Bloodthirsty Eyes), AKA Bloodsucking Eyes; English-dubbed version sold directly to TV in the US in 1980, with three minutes cut
Young Guy vs. Blue Guy	1971	AKA Wakadaishô tai Aodaishô
Godzilla vs. Gigan (AKA Godzilla on Monster Island)	1972	AKA Chikyu Kogeki Meirei: Gojira tai Gaigan (Earth Destruction Directive: Godzilla vs. Gigan); the last film in which Haruo Nakajima played Godzilla; also features Anguirus and King Ghidorah and the first appearance of Gigan
Hanzo the Razor: Sword of Justice	1972	Produced with Katsu Production
Daigoro vs. Goliath	1972	AKA Kaiju funsen: Daigoro tai Goriasu (The Monsters' Desperate Battle: Daigoro vs. Goliath); a co-production with Toho and Tsuburaya Productions. The film was originally planned to be called Godzilla vs. Redmoon but that project was scrapped and finally became this film; made for Japanese TV
Lone Wolf and Cub: Sword of Vengeance	1972	The first twelve minutes were used in the film Shogun Assassin
Lone Wolf and Cub: Baby Cart at the River Styx	1972	Portions were used in Shogun Assassin
Lone Wolf and Cub: Baby Cart to Hades	1972	AKA Shogun Assassin 2: Lightning Swords of Death
Lone Wolf and Cub: Baby Cart in Peril	1972	AKA Shogun Assassin 3: Slashing Blades of Carnage
Godzilla vs. Megalon	1973	AKA Gojira tai Megaro; the first Godzilla film in which Godzilla is not played by Haruo Nakajima; the return of Gigan, and the first appearances of both Megalon and Jet Jaguar
Hanzo the Razor: The Snare	1973	
Kure Kure Takora	1973	translation: Gimme Gimme, Octopus; a Japanese children's television series
Lady Snowblood	1973	AKA Shurayuki-hime; action film based on a Japanese manga
Lone Wolf and Cub: Baby Cart in the Land of Demons	1973	AKA Shogun Assassin 4: Five Fistfuls of Gold
The Human Revolution	1973	AKA Ningen kakumei
Submersion of Japan	1973	AKA Nippon chiubotsu; AKA Tidal Wave
Godzilla vs. Mechagodzilla	1974	AKA Gojira tai Mekagojira; originally known in the US as Godzilla vs. the Bionic Monster, then changed to Godzilla vs. the Cosmic Monster; the first appearances of both Mechagodzilla and King Caesar
Hanzo the Razor: Who's Got the Gold?	1974	
Prophecies of Nostradamus	1974	AKA Nostrodamus no dai yogen; AKA The Last Days of Planet Earth, AKA Catastrophe 1999; released to US television in 1981
Evil of Dracula	1974	AKA Chi o suu bara (Bloodthirsty Rose); AKA The Vampire Rose, The Bloodsucking Rose
Lone Wolf and Cub: White Heaven in Hell	1974	AKA Shogun Assassin 5: Cold Road to Hell
Lupin III	1974	AKA Lupin III: Strange Psychokinetic Strategy, AKA Rupan Sansei: Nenriki Chin Sakusen; live action film based on a Japanese manga comic book
ESPY	1974	AKA Esupai; AKA E.S.P. Spy
Terror of Mechagodzilla	1975	AKA Mekagojira no gyakushu (Mechagodzilla's Counterattack), AKA The Terror of Godzilla; the first appearances of both Mechagodzilla 2 and Titanosaurus
Demon Spies	1975	AKA Oniwaban
Under the Blossoming Cherry Trees	1975	AKA Sakura no mori no mankai no shita
The Human Revolution II	1976	AKA Zoku ningen kakumei; the sequel to the 1973 film The Human Revolution
The Inugamis	1976	AKA The Inugami Family
The Last Dinosaur	1977	AKA Saigo no Kyoru, AKA Polar Probe Ship: Polar Borer; joint effort between Toho, Rankin/Bass, Tsuburaya Productions, CIC, and Warner Bros. Aired in the United States February 11, 1977 as an edited made-for-TV movie on ABC, and shortly afterwards was released in Japan as a theatrical feature (in English language with subtitles), then later released in Japan on television (dubbed in Japanese)
House (Hausu)	1977	never dubbed in English
The War in Space	1977	AKA Wakusei daisenso (The Great Planet War)
The Mystery of Mamo	1978	AKA The Secret of Mamo; animated film based on a manga (comic book)
The Phoenix	1978	AKA Hinotori; released subtitled in the US in 1982 at 137 minutes
The Castle of Cagliostro	1979	released dubbed in the UK in 1991 at 100 minutes, animated film based on a manga (comic book)

== 1980s ==
Film	Release date	Notes
Doraemon: Nobita's Dinosaur	1980	AKA Doraemon: Nobita no Kyōryū; anime; first film in the Doraemon feature film series
Phoenix 2772	1980	AKA Firebird 2772: Love's Cosmozone; animated film based on manga Phoenix
Kagemusha	1980	AKA Shadow Warrior; co-winner of the Palme d'Or at the 1980 Cannes Film Festival with Bob Fosse's All That Jazz; directed by Akira Kurosawa.
Eki Station	1981	AKA Station; chosen Best Film at the Japan Academy Prize ceremony
Doraemon: The Records of Nobita, Spaceblazer	1981	AKA Doraemon Nobita no Uchū Kaitakushi; anime; second film in the Doraemon feature film series
The Wizard of Oz	1982	The first animated film in which Toho participated in the production. Intended for a theatrical release but eventually released straight to video and on television.
Techno Police 21C	1982	AKA Tekunoporisu Tuentiwan-Senchurī; anime
The Highest Honor	1982	Australian/Japanese co-production
Doraemon: Nobita and the Haunts of Evil	1982	AKA Doraemon: Nobita no Daimakyō; anime; third film in the Doraemon feature film series
Deathquake	1983	AKA Jishin retto; AKA Earthquake 7.9, AKA Megaforce 7.9; released as a television film in the US
Golgo 13	1983	AKA Golgo 13: The Professional; based on a manga series, and the first animated film to incorporate CGI animation
The Makioka Sisters	1983	AKA Sasame-yuki (translation: Light Snowfall)
Sayonara Jupiter	1983	AKA Bye Bye Jupiter
Doraemon: Nobita and the Castle of the Undersea Devil	1983	AKA Doraemon Nobita no Kaiteiki Ganjō; anime; fourth film in the Doraemon feature film series
Macross: Do You Remember Love?	1984	AKA Super Spacefortress Macross, AKA Clash of the Bionoids (a later edited version)
Urusei Yatsura: Beautiful Dreamer	1984	AKA Urusei Yatsura 2 Byūtifuru Dorīmā; anime
Zero Fighter	1984	AKA Zerosen Moyu; AKA Zero Fighter in Flames
The Return of Godzilla (AKA Godzilla 1985)	1984	Considered the first Heisei Godzilla film, despite being made during the Showa period, since Heisei started in 1989; the first Godzilla film since Terror of Mechagodzilla (1975); Godzilla was enlarged from 50 meters to 80 meters in this film
Doraemon: Nobita's Great Adventure into the Underworld	1984	AKA Doraemon: Nobita no Makai Daibōken; anime; fifth film in the Doraemon feature film series
Ran	1985	directed by Akira Kurosawa
Vampire Hunter D	1985	AKA Banpaia Hantā Dī
Penguin's Memory: Shiawase Monogatari	1985	Animated movie based on Suntory Beer's mid 80's advertising campaign
Doraemon: Nobita's Little Star Wars	1985	AKA Doraemon: Nobita no Ritoru Sutā Wōzu; anime; sixth film in the Doraemon feature film series
Pulgasari	1985	North Korean-Japanese-Chinese co-production featuring special effects by Teruyoshi Nakano
Prussian Blue Portrait	1986	AKA Purushian burû no shôzô
Doraemon: Nobita and the Steel Troops	1986	AKA Doraemon Nobita to Tetsujin Heidan; anime; seventh film in the Doraemon feature film series
A Taxing Woman	1987	AKA Marusa no onna
Neo Tokyo	1987	AKA Manie Manie; anime
Shatterer	1987	AKA Shataraa (Japanese-Italian co-production)
Doraemon: Nobita and the Knights on Dinosaurs	1987	AKA Doraemon Nobita to Ryū no Kishi; anime; eighth film in the Doraemon feature film series
Princess from the Moon	1987	AKA Taketori Monogatari
A Taxing Woman's Return	1988	AKA Marusa no onna 2
Doraemon: The Record of Nobita's Parallel Visit to the West	1988	AKA Doraemon: Nobita no Parareru saiyûki; anime; ninth film in the Doraemon feature film series
Tokyo: The Last Megalopolis	1988	Concluded in Tokyo: The Last War (1989)
Grave of the Fireflies	1988	AKA Hotaru no Haka; anime; Distributor, produced by Studio Ghibli. First Ghibli film distributed by Toho.
Kimagure Orange Road: I Want to Return to That Day	1988	AKA The Whimsical Orange Road (translation of the Japanese title)
Akira	1988	Anime
My Neighbor Totoro	1988	AKA Tonari no Totoro; anime; Distributor, produced by Studio Ghibli.
Godzilla vs. Biollante	1989	The second Godzilla in the Heisei series; the first official Godzilla made in the Heisei era; the first Heisei Godzilla where Godzilla battles an enemy monster (Biollante).
Gunhed	1989	AKA Ganhedo
Doraemon: Nobita and the Birth of Japan	1989	AKA Doraemon: Nobita no Nippon Tanjō; anime; tenth film in the Doraemon feature film series
Sweet Home	1989	Horror film (simultaneously released as a video game)
Tokyo: The Last War	1989	Sequel to Tokyo: The Last Megalopolis

== 1990s ==
Film	Release date	Notes
Devil Hunter Yohko	1990	AKA Mamono Hantā Yōko (anime)
Akira Kurosawa's Dreams	1990	directed by Akira Kurosawa
Solar Crisis	1990	based on a novel; a co-production with National Film Board of Canada, Gakken and Trimark Pictures
Doraemon: Nobita and the Animal Planet	1990	AKA Doraemon: Nobita to Animaru Puranetto; anime; 11th film in the Doraemon feature film series
Zipang	1990	Toho distributed this film but did not produce it
Hong Kong Paradise	1990	
Only Yesterday	1991	AKA Omoide Poro Poro (translation: "Memories Come Tumbling Down"); anime; Distributor, produced by Studio Ghibli
Zeiram	1991	AKA Zeiramu; a sequel came out in 1992, but Bandai, not Toho made it
Godzilla vs. King Ghidorah	1991	Generated controversy for its depiction of Godzilla in his original form (a Godzillasaurus) killing American soldiers in World War II; first appearance of Mecha-King Ghidorah; Godzilla's size increased to 100 meters
Doraemon: Nobita's Dorabian Nights	1991	AKA Doraemon: Nobita no Dorabian Naito; anime; 12th film in the Doraemon feature film series
Godzilla vs. Mothra	1992	First appearance of Mothra since Destroy All Monsters (1968)
Doraemon: Nobita and the Kingdom of Clouds	1992	AKA Doraemon: Nobita to Kumo no Ōkoku; anime; 13th film in the Doraemon feature film series
Porco Rosso	1992	AKA Crimson Pig; anime based on a manga; Distributor, produced by Studio Ghibli
Godzilla vs. Charles Barkley	1992	A commercial for Nike that has Godzilla and Giant Charles Barkley battle in basketball
Godzilla vs. Mechagodzilla II	1993	First appearance of Mechagodzilla since Terror of Mechagodzilla (1975); first appearance of Godzilla's second son, here known as Godzilla Junior, Baby Godzilla, and Little Godzilla.
Doraemon: Nobita and the Tin Labyrinth	1993	AKA Doraemon: Nobita to Buriki no Rabirinsu; anime; 14th film in the Doraemon feature film series
Crayon Shin-chan: Action Mask vs. Leotard Devil	1993	AKA Kureyon Shinchan: Akushon Kamen tai Haigure Maō; anime; 1st film in the Crayon Shin-chan feature film series
Godzilla vs. SpaceGodzilla	1994	First appearance of SpaceGodzilla; the second appearance of Godzilla's second son, now known as Little Godzilla.
Doraemon: Nobita's Three Visionary Swordsmen	1994	AKA Doraemon: Nobita to Mugen Sankenshi; anime; 15th film in the Doraemon feature film series
Gamera: Guardian of the Universe	1995	First Gamera film in the trilogy; Toho only handled distribution
Godzilla vs. Destoroyah	1995	Final Heisei Godzilla film; first appearance of Destoroyah; third and final appearance of Godzilla Junior.
Gakkō no Kaidan	1995	First film in the "Gakkō no Kaidan" series
Doraemon: Nobita's Diary on the Creation of the World	1995	AKA Doraemon: Nobita no Sōsei Nikki; anime; 16th film in the Doraemon feature film series
Gakkō no Kaidan 2	1996	Second film in the Gakkō no Kaidan series
Gamera 2: Attack of Legion	1996	Second film in the Heisei Gamera trilogy; Toho only handled distribution
New Kimagure Orange Road: And Then, The Beginning of That Summer	1996	Anime based on a manga story
Doraemon: Nobita and the Galaxy Super-express	1996	AKA Doraemon: Nobita to Ginga Ekusupuresu; anime; 17th film in the Doraemon feature film series
Rebirth of Mothra	1996	AKA Mosura (Mothra); first film in the Mothra trilogy
Gakkō no Kaidan 3	1997	Third film of the Gakkō no Kaidan series
Detective Conan: The Time Bombed Skyscraper	1997	First film of the Detective Conan series
Doraemon: Nobita and the Spiral City	1997	AKA Doraemon: Nobita no Nejimaki Shitī Bōkenki; anime; 18th film in the Doraemon feature film series
Princess Mononoke	1997	AKA Mononoke-hime (translation: "Spirit Monster Princess"); anime; Distributor, produced by Studio Ghibli
Rebirth of Mothra II	1997	AKA Mosura Tsū: Kaitei no Daikessen (Mothra 2: The Battle Under the Deep Sea); second film in the Mothra trilogy
Rebirth of Mothra III	1998	AKA Mosura Surī: Kingu Gidora Raishū (Mothra 3: Invasion of King Ghidorah); final installment in the Mothra trilogy
Detective Conan: The Fourteenth Target	1998	AKA Meitantei Konan: Jūyon-banme no Tāgetto, AKA Case Closed: The Fourteenth Target; the second film in the Detective Conan series
Godzilla	1998	Originally produced and released by TriStar Pictures, starring Matthew Broderick; the first Godzilla film from a Hollywood studio; the third Godzilla film to be completely produced by an American film studio; Toho handled Japanese distributor.
Ring	1998	AKA Ringu; horror film based on the 1991 novel by Kôji Suzuki; would spawn sequels and American adaptations
Doraemon: Nobita's Great Adventure in the South Seas	1998	AKA Doraemon: Nobita no Nankai Daibōuken; anime; 19th film in the Doraemon feature film series
Pokémon: The First Movie	1998	First film in the Pokémon franchise; originally produced by gaming company Nintendo and The Pokémon Company.
Detective Conan: The Last Wizard of the Century	1999	Third film in the Detective Conan series
Gakkō no Kaidan 4	1999	Final installment of the Gakkō no Kaidan series
Gamera 3: Revenge of Iris	1999	Final installment of the Heisei Gamera trilogy; Toho only handled distribution
Doraemon: Nobita Drifts in the Universe	1999	AKA Doraemon: Nobita no Uchū Hyōryūki; anime; 20th film in the Doraemon feature film series
Godzilla 2000: Millennium	1999	First Millennium Era Godzilla film
Pokémon: The Movie 2000	1999	Second film in the ongoing Pokémon series

== 2000s ==
Film	Release date	Notes
Pyrokinesis	2000	
Detective Conan: Captured in Her Eyes	2000	Fourth film of the Detective Conan series
Pokémon 3: The Movie	2000	Third film of the Pokémon franchise
Gojoe (aka Gojoe: Spirit War Chronicle)	2000	
Godzilla vs. Megaguirus	2000	Second film of the Millennium Godzilla series
Detective Conan: Countdown to Heaven	2001	Fifth film of the Detective Conan series
Metropolis	2001	Anime; co-production with Madhouse
Merdeka 17805	2001	Co-production with Rapi Films (Indonesia), Eros International (India) and Pathé (France)
Kairo (aka Pulse)	2001	later remade for American audiences
Spirited Away	2001	Anime; Distributor, produced by Studio Ghibli
Inuyasha the Movie: Affections Touching Across Time	2001	the first Inuyashi film based on the series; co-productions with Sunrise
Pokémon 4Ever	2001	Fourth film of the Pokémon franchise
Beyblade: Fierce Battle	2001	AKA Bakuten Shoot Beyblade The Movie: Gekitou!! Takao vs. Daichi
Tottoko Hamtaro The Movie: Adventures in Ham-Ham Land	2001	Anime; first film of the Hamtaro series
Godzilla, Mothra and King Ghidorah: Giant Monsters All-Out Attack	2001	Third film of the Millennium Godzilla series
Detective Conan: The Phantom of Baker Street	2002	Sixth film of the Detective Conan series
Pokémon Heroes	2002	Fifth film of the Pokémon franchise
Trotting Hamtaro The Movie: Ham Ham Hamuja! The Captive Princess	2002	Second film of the Hamtaro series
Godzilla Against Mechagodzilla	2002	Fourth film of the Millennium Godzilla series
Detective Conan: Crossroad in the Ancient Capital	2003	Seventh film of the Detective Conan series
One Missed Call	2003	Based on the 2003 Yasushi Akimoto novel Chakushin Ari; later remade for American audiences
Tottoko Hamtaro The Movie: Ham-Ham Grand Prix – Miracle in Aurora Valley – Ribbon-chan's Close Call!	2003	Third film of the Hamtaro series
Godzilla: Tokyo S.O.S.	2003	Fifth film of the Millennium Godzilla series
Pokémon: Jirachi Wishmaker	2003	Sixth film of the Pokémon franchise
Detective Conan: Magician of the Silver Sky	2004	Eighth film of the Detective Conan series
Howl's Moving Castle	2004	Anime; co-production with Studio Ghibli
Naruto the Movie: Ninja Clash in the Land of Snow	2004	Anime; co-production with Studio Pierrot
Godzilla: Final Wars	2004	Sixth and final installment of the Millennium Godzilla series
Steamboy	2004	Anime
Ghost in the Shell 2: Innocence	2004	Anime
Tottoko Hamtaro Ham Ham Paradise! The Movie: Hamtaro and the Demon of the Mysterious Picture Book Tower	2004	the fourth film of the Hamtaro series
Pokémon: Destiny Deoxys	2004	the seventh film of the Pokémon animated series
Aishite Imasu 1941: Mahal Kita	2004	Co-production with Regal Entertainment, (Philippines) for 2004 Metro Manila Film Festival
Lorelei: The Witch of the Pacific Ocean	2005	Co-production with Constantin Film (Germany)
Detective Conan: Strategy Above the Depths	2005	the ninth film of the Detective Conan series
Always Sanchōme no Yūhi	2005	
Naruto the Movie 2	2005	the sequel to Naruto the Movie
Densha Otoko	2005	
NANA	2005	
Arashi no Yoru ni	2005	
Pokémon: Lucario and the Mystery of Mew	2005	the eighth film of the Pokémon animated series
Bleach: Memories of Nobody	2006	
Gekijōban Dōbutsu no Mori	2006	a co-production with OLM, Nintendo, and Shogakukan
Detective Conan: The Private Eyes' Requiem	2006	the 10th film of the Detective Conan series
Nada Sousou	2006	
NANA 2	2006	the sequel to NANA
Forbidden Siren	2006	Co-production with TV Asahi, Shogakukan, Hakuhodo DY Music & Pictures, and Office Crescendo
Nihon Chinbotsu (Japan Sinks) (aka Sinking of Japan)	2006	Remake of Submersion of Japan (1973)
Pokémon Ranger and the Temple of the Sea	2006	the ninth film of the Pokémon animated series
Doraemon: Nobita's Dinosaur 2006	2006	a remake of the 1980 film
Touch	2006	
Always Zoku Sanchome no Yuhi	2007	
Eiga De Tojo-Tamagotchi: Dokidoki! Uchuu no Maigotchi!?	2007	
Hero	2007	
Crows Zero (aka Crows: Episode Zero)	2007	based on the manga by Hiroshi Takahashi
Detective Conan: Jolly Roger in the Deep Azure	2007	the 11th film of the Detective Conan series
Doraemon: Nobita's New Great Adventure into the Underworld	2007	a remake of the 1984 film
Pokémon: The Rise of Darkrai	2007	the 10th film of the Pokémon animated series
Pokémon: Giratina and the Sky Warrior	2008	the 11th film of the Pokémon animated series
Hana Yori Dango Final	2008	
Ponyo on the Cliff	2008	Co-production with Studio Ghibli
20th Century Boys: Beginning of the End	2008	the first film of the 20th Century Boy series
Mystery of the Third Planet	2008	
Doraemon: Nobita and the Green Giant Legend	2008	
Detective Conan: Full Score of Fear	2009	the 12th film of the Detective Conan series
20th Century Boys 2: The Last Hope and 20th Century Boys 3: Redemption	2009	the two sequels to 20th Century Boys: Beginning of the End
Doraemon: The Record of Nobita's Spaceblazer	2009	a remake of the 1981 film
Crows Zero 2	2009	Sequel to Crows Zero
Detective Conan: The Raven Chaser	2009	the 13th film of the Detective Conan series
April Bride	2009	
Rookies	2009	
Gokusen: The Movie	2009	
Amalfi: Rewards of the Goddess	2009	
Pokémon: Arceus and the Jewel of Life	2009	the 12th film of the Pokémon animated series
Summer Wars	2009	Mamoru Hosoda's first film to be joint distributed by Warner Bros.
I Give My First Love to You	2009	
Shizumanu Taiyō	2009	
Professor Layton and the Eternal Diva	2009	

== 2010s ==
Film	Release date	Notes
Doraemon: Nobita's Great Battle of the Mermaid King	2010	another sequel in the Doraemon series
Liar Game: The Final Stage	2010	
Detective Conan: The Lost Ship in the Sky	2010	the 14th film of the Detective Conan series
Confessions	2010	
Bayside Shakedown 3	2010	
Pokémon: Zoroark: Master of Illusions	2010	the 13th film of the Pokémon animated series
Arrietty	2010	
Hanamizuki	2010	
Colorful	2010	
Umizaru 3: The Last Message	2010	another sequel to Umizaru
13 Assassins	2010	
Space Battleship Yamato	2010	based on Leiji Matsumoto's manga
Gantz	2011	AKA Gantz: Perfect Answer
Doraemon: Nobita and the New Steel Troops—Winged Angels	2011	another sequel in the Doraemon series
Detective Conan: Quarter of Silence	2011	the 15th film of the Detective Conan series
Pokémon the Movie: Black—Victini and Reshiram and Pokémon the Movie: White—Victini and Zekrom (2011)	2011	the 14th film(s) of the Pokémon animated series; this is also the first Pokémon film(s) to be the same story, but the other version has the legendary Pokémon Reshiram and Zekrom reversed
From Up on Poppy Hill	2011	
Unfair 2: The Answer	2011	the sequel to Unfair
A Ghost of a Chance	2011	
Genji Monogatari: Sennen no Nazo	2011	
Always Sanchōme no Yūhi '64	2012	
Ace Attorney	2012	
Doraemon: Nobita and the Island of Miracles—Animal Adventure	2012	another sequel in the Doraemon series
Detective Conan: The Eleventh Striker	2012	the 16th film of the Detective Conan series
Thermae Romae	2012	the first film of the Thermae Romae series
Brave Hearts: Umizaru	2012	
Pokémon the Movie: Kyurem vs. the Sword of Justice	2012	the 15th film for the Pokémon animated series
The Wolf Children Ame and Yuki	2012	Studio Chizu's first film to be distributed by Toho
Jewelpet the Movie: Sweets Dance Princess	2012	
Bayside Shakedown The Final	2012	the final Bayside Shakedown film
Blue Exorcist: The Movie	2012	a co-production with A-1 Pictures
Doraemon: Nobita's Secret Gadget Museum	2013	another sequel in the Doraemon series
Detective Conan: Private Eye in the Distant Sea	2013	the 17th film of the Detective Conan series
Shimajirō to Fufu no Daibōken: Sukue! Nanairo no Hana	2013	the first Shimajiro film produced by Benesse.
Midsummer's Equation	2013	
Pokémon the Movie: Genesect and the Legend Awakened	2013	the 16th film for the Pokémon animated series
The Wind Rises	2013	
Gatchaman	2013	
The Tale of the Princess Kaguya	2013	
Lupin the 3rd vs. Detective Conan: The Movie	2013	the 17th film of the Detective Conan series; the second film in the Lupin III series; this is also a team-up between two different characters who appeared in one film, similar to King Kong vs. Godzilla
The Eternal Zero	2013	
Doraemon: New Nobita's Great Demon—Peko and the Exploration Party of Five	2014	another sequel in the Doraemon series.
Detective Conan: Dimensional Sniper	2014	the 18th film of the Detective Conan series
Thermae Romae II	2014	the second film of the Thermae Romae series
A Bolt from the Blue	2014	
Shimajirō to Kujira no Uta	2014	the second Shimajiro film produced by Benesse.
Pokémon the Movie: Diancie and the Cocoon of Destruction	2014	the 17th film of the Pokémon animated series
When Marnie Was There	2014	
Godzilla	2014	the first Godzilla film since Godzilla: Final Wars (2004); the first American Godzilla film, since TriStar's Godzilla (1998); the first Godzilla film made by Legendary Pictures and Warner Bros.; the first film of the MonsterVerse series; the first Godzilla MonsterVerse film; this would be the first Godzilla film made since Godzilla: Final Wars, until Toho's Shin Godzilla two years later, made to commemorate the franchise's 60th anniversary.
Stand by Me Doraemon	2014	another sequel in the Doraemon series, first Doraemon movie using the 3D CGI technology
Lupin III	2014	the third film of the Lupin III series; it is actually the fourth film if you count Lupin the 3rd vs. Detective Conan: The Movie
A Samurai Chronicle	2014	
Parasyte: Part 1	2014	the first film of the Parasyte series
The Last: Naruto the Movie	2014	the last film of the Naruto series until Boruto: Naruto the Movie
Blue Spring Ride	2014	
The Vancouver Asahi	2014	
Yo-Kai Watch the Movie: The Secret is Created, Nyan!	2014	the first Yo-Kai Watch film for the Yo-Kai Watch TV series
Doraemon: Nobita's Space Heroes	2015	another sequel in the Doraemon series
Assassination Classroom	2015	
Crayon Shin-chan: My Moving Story! Cactus Large Attack!	2015	
Detective Conan: Sunflowers of Inferno	2015	the 19th film of the Detective Conan series
Parasyte: Part 2	2015	the second film of the Parasyte series
Flying Colors	2015	
The Boy and the Beast	2015	Studio Chizu's second film to be distributed by Toho
Hero	2015	
Shimajirō to Ōkina Ki	2015	the third Shimajiro film produced by Benesse.
Pokémon the Movie: Hoopa and the Clash of Ages	2015	the 18th film of the Pokémon animated series
Dragon Blade	2015	a co-production with Studio Ghibli
Attack on Titan	2015	AKA Attack on Titan: End of the World; the first official Toho monster film made in live action since Godzilla: Final Wars, which was made in 2004
Boruto: Naruto the Movie	2015	the first Naruto film since The Last: Naruto the Movie
Unfair: The End	2015	the final film of the Unfair series
Doraemon: Nobita and the Birth of Japan 2016	2016	another sequel in the Doraemon series
Detective Conan: The Darkest Nightmare	2016	the 20th film of the Detective Conan series
Pokémon the Movie: Volcanion and the Mechanical Marvel	2016	the 19th film of the Pokémon animated series
Shimajirō to Ehon no Kuni ni	2016	the fourth Shimajiro film produced by Benesse.
Shin Godzilla	2016	the first Toho Godzilla film since Godzilla: Final Wars; the first Toho Godzilla film to use two directors; the first appearance of Godzilla in an official Toho film since his cameo appearance in the 2007 film Always Zoku Sanchome no Yuhi; the first appearance of Godzilla since the 2014 film Godzilla; the first Reiwa Era Godzilla film; the first Godzilla film in which he is the only monster in the film since the 1984 film The Return of Godzilla.
Your Name	2016	
Fueled: The Man They Called Pirate	2016	based on the novel of the same name
Doraemon the Movie 2017: Great Adventure in the Antarctic Kachi Kochi	2017	another sequel in the Doraemon series
Kong: Skull Island	2017	the second MonsterVerse film; the first King Kong film since the 2005 remake of King Kong; the first MonsterVerse film which does not have Godzilla in it, except for the post-credits scene which feature cave drawings of Godzilla, Mothra and Rodan, with the last cave drawing showing Godzilla fighting King Ghidorah, after which Godzilla's roar is heard when the screen goes black, hinting at the 2019 film Godzilla: King of the Monsters; the first King Kong reboot film since King Kong vs. Godzilla and King Kong Escapes
Crayon Shin-chan: Invasion!! Alien Shiriri	2017	the 25th film of the Crayon Shin-chan series
Detective Conan: The Crimson Love Letter	2017	the 21st film of the Detective Conan series
Lu over the Wall	2017	the film won the Cristal du long metrage at the 2017 Annecy International Animation Film Festival.
Shimajirō to Niji no Oashisu	2017	the fifth Shimajiro film to be produced by Benesse.
Pokémon the Movie: I Choose You!	2017	the 20th film of the Pokémon animated series
Godzilla: Planet of the Monsters	2017	the first animated Godzilla film; the second film of the Reiwa series; the first film of an animated Godzilla trilogy, with two sequel films released soon after this one
Doraemon the Movie: Nobita's Treasure Island	2018	
Crayon Shin-chan: Burst Serving! Kung Fu Boys ~Ramen Rebellion~	2018	Another sequel in the Shin-chan series.
Godzilla: City on the Edge of Battle	2018	
Shimajiro Mahō no Shima no Daibōken	2018	the sixth Shimajiro film to be produced by Benesse and the first Shimajiro film to be fully animated.
Pokémon the Movie: The Power of Us	2018	the 21st film of the Pokémon animated series
Mirai	2018	Studio Chizu's third film to be distributed by Toho
Detective Conan: Zero the Enforcer	2018	the 22nd Detective Conan film series.
My Hero Academia: Two Heroes	2018	based on My Hero Academia
Nisekoi	2018	the first Toho Reiwa romantic comedy film
Penguin Highway	2018	
Godzilla: The Planet Eater	2018	
Doraemon: Nobita's Chronicle of the Moon Exploration	2019	
Detective Conan: The Fist of Blue Sapphire	2019	the 23rd film of the Detective Conan series
Crayon Shin-chan: Honeymoon Hurricane ~The Lost Hiroshi~	2019	
Shimajiro to Ururu no Heroland	2019	the seventh Shimajiro produced by Benesse. Also the first film to feature Ratman and Princess Strawberry.
Pokémon Detective Pikachu	2019	based on the video game of the same name
Godzilla: King of the Monsters	2019	under license to Toho; a Legendary Pictures production; the third MonsterVerse film; the second MonsterVerse Godzilla film
Gundala	2019	Co-production with ScreenPlay Films (Indonesia) and Lotte Cultureworks (South Korea) for 2019 Toronto International Film Festival; based on the Indonesian superhero of the same name
Ride Your Wave	2019	
Mewtwo Strikes Back: Evolution	2019	the 22nd film of the Pokémon animated series; a computer-animated remake of Pokémon: The First Movie
Weathering with You	2019	
Dragon Quest: Your Story	2019	based on the Dragon Quest (Dragon Quest V) series by Square Enix
Kaguya-sama: Love Is War	2019	the second Toho Reiwa romantic comedy film
Hello World	2019	the first Toho Annecy Fantasy Project film
Human Lost	2019	a computer-animated adaptation of Osamu Dazai's novel of the same name in a futuristic sci-fi setting; written by Tow Ubukata
Promare	2019	Studio Trigger's first film
Lupin III: The First	2019	a computer-animated film adaptation of Monkey Punch's franchise of the same name
My Hero Academia: Heroes Rising	2019	based on My Hero Academia
G vs. G	2019	the prequel to Godzilla vs. Gigan Rex

== 2020s ==
Film	Release date	Notes
Wotakoi: Love is Hard for Otaku	2020	the third Toho Reiwa romantic comedy film
Doraemon: Nobita's New Dinosaur	2020	the first Doraemon film released in the Reiwa period
Crayon Shin-chan: Crash! Graffiti Kingdom and Almost Four Heroes	2020	
The Promised Neverland	2020	a live-action film based on a manga series; distributed by Toho, a co-production with Fuji Television and Shueisha.
Demon Slayer: Kimetsu no Yaiba – The Movie: Mugen Train	2020	a co-distribution with Aniplex.
Stand by Me Doraemon 2	2020	the second Doraemon CGI film, sequel to Stand by Me Doraemon
Pokémon the Movie: Secrets of the Jungle	2020	the 23rd film in the Pokémon animated series
Monster Hunter	2020	based on a video game series by Capcom; a co-production with AB2 Pictures, Screen Gems, Constantin Film, Sony Pictures, and Tencent Pictures
Godzilla Appears At G-Fest	2020	the first ever G-Fest short film produced
Evangelion: 3.0+1.0	2021	the fourth film of the Rebuild of Evangelion series; a co-distribution with Toei
Shimajiro to Sora Tobufune	2021	the eighth Shimajiro film to be produced by Benesse which has been delayed by the coronavirus pandemic and the first full 3DCG film.
Godzilla vs. Kong	2021	under license from Toho; a Legendary Pictures production and a crossover film; the fourth MonsterVerse film; the third MonsterVerse Godzilla film; the second MonsterVerse King Kong film; the fourth Godzilla film to be completely produced by an American film studio. Released in theaters and HBO Max at same time.
Detective Conan: The Scarlet Bullet	2021	the 24th film of the Detective Conan series.
Belle	2021	Studio Chizu's fourth film to be distributed by Toho
My Hero Academia: World Heroes' Mission	2021	based on My Hero Academia
What Did You Eat Yesterday?	2021	based on a manga by Fumi Yoshinaga
Jujutsu Kaisen 0	2021	Based on a manga by Gege Akutami
Godzilla vs. Hedorah 50th Anniversary	2021	the second G-Fest film created, which was for the 50th anniversary of the original full length film of the same name
The Deer King	2022	the second Toho Annecy Fantasy Project film
Doraemon: Nobita's Little Star Wars 2021	2022	remake of the 1985 film
Shimajirō to Kirakira Ōkoku no Ōji-sama	2022	the tenth Shimajiro film to be produced by Benesse. The final film which featured Saori Sugimoto before her death on October 21, 2021.
Mr. Osomatsu	2022	a live-action film based on an anime series by Yoichi Fujita.
Detective Conan: The Bride of Halloween	2022	the 25th film of the Detective Conan series.
Shin Ultraman	2022	based on the Ultra Series franchise; made to commemorate the 55th anniversary of the Ultra Series; a co-production with Cine Bazar and Tsuburaya Productions
Ghost Book	2022	Distributor; produced by Robot Communications.
Suzume	2022	Distributor; produced by CoMix Wave Films, marked the company's 90th anniversary.
Godzilla vs. Gigan Rex	2022	The 3rd G-Fest short film made which was actually posted on youtube first with a sequel to a fan movie has crazy new more powerful Gigan(s)
Fest Godzilla 3: Gigan Attacks	2022	The technically 3rd G-Fest film to celebrate the 50th year anniversary of the original full length film Godzilla vs. Gigan
Demon Slayer: Kimetsu no Yaiba – To the Swordsmith Village	2023	a co-distribution with Aniplex.
Doraemon: Nobita's Sky Utopia	2023	
My Happy Marriage	2023	based on a light novel series by Akumi Agitogi.
Gridman Universe	2023	Studio Trigger's second film; a crossover between SSSS.Gridman and SSSS.Dynazenon.
Living	2023	Distributor; a British film adaptation of Akira Kurosawa's Ikiru and inspired by Leo Tolstoy's The Death of Ivan Ilyich; a co-production of Number 9 Films, Ingenious Media, Film4 Productions, and BFI, marked the company's 90th anniversary.
Detective Conan: Black Iron Submarine	2023	the 26th film of the Detective Conan series.
Tokyo MER: Mobile Emergency Room – The Movie	2023	AKA TOKYO MER 走る緊急救命室 #劇場版 a film adaptation of the Japanese drama of the same name, produced by TBS Holdings.
Psycho-Pass Providence	2023	under license from Toho Animation; a Production I.G co-production, marked the 10th anniversary of the Psycho-Pass franchise.
The Boy and the Heron	2023	Hayao Miyazaki's twelfth animated feature film and produced by Studio Ghibli, after 10 years of development and production since The Wind Rises (2013).
Crayon Shin-chan: Chōnōryoku Dai-Kessen	2023	based on a manga by Yoshito Usui, marked the 30th anniversary of the anime adaptation.
Sand Land	2023	based on a manga by Akira Toriyama, marked the 24th anniversary of the manga adaptation.
Godzilla Minus One	2023	The fifth Reiwa Era Godzilla film since Shin Godzilla (2016) and the anime trilogy; set in the post-occupation Japan, made to commemorate the franchise's 69th and 70th anniversaries.
Kubi	2023	Set during the Honnō-ji Incident in 1582 through the Japanese invasions of Korea in the 1590s, which took place in the Sengoku period; a co-production with Kadokawa Daiei Studio.
Spy × Family — Code: White	2023	based on a manga by Tatsuya Endo.
Demon Slayer: Kimetsu no Yaiba – To the Hashira Training	2024	a co-distribution with Aniplex.
Doraemon: Nobita's Earth Symphony	2024	
Godzilla x Kong: The New Empire	2024	under license from Toho; a Legendary Pictures production and a sequel to Godzilla vs. Kong; the fifth MonsterVerse film; the fourth MonsterVerse Godzilla film; the third MonsterVerse King Kong film; the fifth Godzilla film to be completely produced by an American film studio, made to commemorate the franchise's 70th anniversary.
Detective Conan: The Million-dollar Pentagram	2024	the 27th film in the Detective Conan series.
Teasing Master Takagi-san Movie	2024	Distributor; based on the manga series Teasing Master Takagi-san by Sōichirō Yamamoto.
Doraemon: Nobita's Art World Tales	2025	the 44th film in the Doraemon series.
Detective Conan: One-eyed Flashback	2025	The 28th film in the Detective Conan series.
Demon Slayer: Kimetsu no Yaiba – The Movie: Infinity Castle	2025	a co-distribution with Aniplex.
Exit 8	2025	Based on the 2023 video game by Kotake Create.
Chainsaw Man – The Movie: Reze Arc	2025	Based on a manga by Tatsuki Fujimoto
Sakamoto Days (サカモト デイズ)	2026	Distributor; a live-action film based on a manga series; produced by CREDEUS and Avex Pictures.
Doraemon: Nobita and the New Castle of the Undersea Devil	2026	the 45th film in the Doraemon series.
The Song You Left Behind (君が最後に遺した歌)	2026	
Detective Conan: Fallen Angel of the Highway	2026	The 29th film in the Detective Conan series.
Chiikawa the Movie: The Secret of the Mermaid Island	2026	Based on a manga by Nagano
Crayon Shin-chan the Movie: Spooky! My Yokai Vacation	2026	
Godzilla Minus Zero	2026	The sixth Reiwa Era Godzilla film and a sequel to Godzilla Minus One

=== Upcoming films ===
Film	Release date	Notes
Doraemon: Nobita's Steam-Powered Time Machine	March 5, 2027	the 46th film in the Doraemon series.
Godzilla x Kong: Supernova	March 26, 2027	a Legendary Pictures Production and a sequel to Godzilla x Kong: The New Empire and the sixth Monsterverse Film; To be distributed internationally by Warner Bros. Pictures
My Hero Academia	Unannounced	Distributor; a live-action film based on a manga series; a co-production with Netflix, Legendary Entertainment, and Shueisha.
Untitled Detective Pikachu sequel	Unannounced	a Legendary Pictures production and a sequel to Pokémon: Detective Pikachu; to be distributed internationally by Warner Bros. Pictures.
Your Name	Unannounced	a live-action film based on a 2016 anime film; a co-production with Paramount Pictures and Bad Robot.
