= Haunted School =

Haunted School or The Haunted School may refer to:

- School Ghost Stories, a 1995 Japanese horror film also known as Haunted School
  - School Ghost Stories 2, a 1996 film also known as Haunted School 2
  - School Ghost Stories 3, a 1997 film also known as Haunted School 3
- The Haunted School (film), a 2007 Hong Kong horror film
- The Haunted School (TV series), an Australian television series
- Haunted Schools, a book by American non-fiction author Allan Zullo

== See also ==
- School Ghost Stories (disambiguation)
- List of reportedly haunted locations
