= 2nd Japan Film Professional Awards =

Japanese film awards in 1993

- Date: March 27, 1993
- Site: Cinema Argo Shinjuku, Tokyo, Japan

The 2nd Japan Film Professional Awards (第2回日本映画プロフェッショナル大賞) is the 2nd edition of the Japan Film Professional Awards. It awarded the best of 1992 in film. The ceremony took place on March 27, 1993, at Cinema Argo Shinjuku in Tokyo.

== Awards ==
- Best Film: Hikinige Family
- Best Director: Hideyuki Hirayama (The Games Teachers Play)
- Best Actress: Tomomi Nishimura (Baku)
- Best Actor: Shirō Sano (Kurenai Monogatari)
- Best New Director: Tadafumi Tomioka (Wangan Bad Boy Blue)
- Special: Atsushi Yamatoya

== 10 best films ==
1. Hikinige Family (Toshiyuki Mizutani)
2. The Games Teachers Play (Hideyuki Hirayama)
3. Pineapple Tours (Tsutomu Makiya, Yuji Nakae, Hayashi Tōma)
4. Wangan Bad Boy Blue (Tadafumi Tomioka)
5. Kurenai Monogatari (Toshiharu Ikeda)
6. Usureyuku Kioku no Nakade (Kazuyuki Shinoda)
7. March Comes In like a Lion (Hitoshi Yazaki)
8. Arifureta Ai ni Kansuru Chōsa (Kōji Enokido)
9. Gunkan Musashi (Masami Tezuka)
10. The Guard from Underground (Kiyoshi Kurosawa)
