= Parasite Eve (film) =

1997 film by Masayuki Ochiai

- Theatrical release poster
- Directed by: Masayuki Ochiai
- Written by: Ryoichi Kimizuka
- Based on: Parasite Eve by Hideaki Sena
- Produced by: Yutaka Okawa; Jiro Komaki; Toru Horibe
- Starring: Hiroshi Mikami; Riona Hazuki; Tomoko Nakajima; Ayako Omura; Tetsuya Bessho
- Cinematography: Kōzō Shibasaki
- Edited by: Yoshifumi Fukuzawa
- Music by: Joe Hisaishi
- Production companies: Fuji Television; Kadokawa Shoten
- Distributed by: Toho
- Release date: February 1, 1997 (Japan)
- Running time: 120 minutes
- Country: Japan
- Language: Japanese
- Budget: ¥550 million
- Box office: ¥490 million

Parasite Eve (Japanese: パラサイト・イヴ, Hepburn: Parasaito Ivu) is a 1997 Japanese science fiction film that was directed by Masayuki Ochiai and is based on the 1995 novel Parasite Eve by Hideaki Sena. Kiyomi (Riona Hazuki), the wife of Toshiaki Nagashima (Hiroshi Mikami), is left brain dead after a traffic accident on the day of their first wedding anniversary. Nagashima attempts to make Kiyomi live again by making a deal with a doctor who wants to harvest Kiyomi's kidneys for transplanting into a young girl in the same hospital. Nagashima agrees on the condition that he can have his wife's liver. While Nagashima experiments with the organ, the doctor finds one night the samples have emerged as a gelatinous form in the form of Toshiaki's dead wife and reveal themselves as an organization of sentient mitochondria that are bent on making a new species that will wipe out humanity.

In 1997, Kadokawa Shoten decided to use the film production side of its business to develop a film version of Parasite Eve, making it its first film in three years. The film was co-produced by Kadokawa and Fuji TV's Motion Picture Division. Ochiai made his debut as a feature film director, having worked in Japanese television on horror series such as Night Head. Parasite Eve was filmed in eight weeks with a budget of ¥550 million. Ochiai was not entirely pleased with the result of the film, feeling he was pressured to push the love story element of the story, later saying there were "so many compromises I had to make that it couldn't be a true horror movie". The film was released in Japan on February 1, 1997, with limited release outside the country. It received mixed reviews; The Daily Yomiuri found the film "mildly enjoyable at times" and Fangoria called it "flawed but fascinating".

== Plot ==
Toshiaki Nagashima is a researcher studying mitochondria and teaches how they are passed between generations from the mother's side of a family and their possible use for tissue regeneration through the liver. Toshiaki's wife Kiyomi visits him at his workplace for their anniversary, which she finds he has forgotten. While traveling home, Kiyomi is involved in a car accident and is left in a coma with brain damage. A doctor, Takashi Yoshizumi, meets with Nagashima the next day and tells him his wife was an organ donor, and that a young girl named Mariko Anzai in the hospital needs a donor kidney. He agrees to donate her kidneys on the condition he can have Kiyomi's liver. Nagashima takes the liver to his lab, dismissing the scientists so he can perform experiments on the organ.

At the hospital, Mariko's health shows a marked improvement but at night she begins to scream, demanding the removal of something from her body; her caretakers dismiss her demands as nightmares.

At his lab, Nagashima finds the liver samples growing at an exponential rate. One night, a gelatin from the liver mixes with samples from a bottle labeled "Eve" and possesses the lab assistant Sachiko. Later that night, Nagashima enters the lab and finds a gelatinous form that morphs itself into the form of Kiyomi. Nagashima approaches her, and they embrace and have sex on the lab floor. Afterwards, the being resembling Kiyomi deteriorates, leaving Nagashima alone.

At home, Nagashima finds Kiyomi's journals, which reveal she was losing control of herself and hearing voices that made her attracted to Nagashima's work, and to manipulate her actions to get Nagashima to perform his experiments, leading up to the previous night. Sachiko approaches Nagashima and tells him to attend her presentation at a science conference. At the conference, Nagashima meets with Yoshizumi, who says Mariko has grown stranger each day and that even her uterus is changing. Sachiko begins to present, revealing herself to be a mitochondria collective that will replace humans and can control the mitochondria in humans. The creature says they have found an ideal womb in which to continue their process. Nagashima asks whether the creature is Eve, before it causes a man in the audience to burst into flames through the mitochondria in his body, which leaves the audience in a panic. Nagashima tells the doctor the creature has collected sperm and is looking for a womb in which to cultivate it, and they both rush to the hospital.

At the hospital, Mariko's abdomen convulses wildly as staff try to help. When Nagashima and Yoshizumi arrive, they find Mariko has fainted and the creature is attempting to escape with her. The creature slowly leaves while setting people on fire as she moves through the hallways. Nagashima and Yoshizumi attempt to use security doors to prevent the creature from escaping, so she moves to the roof with Mariko. Nagashima pleads with the creature, calling her Kiyomi, to let Mariko go. The creature responds her form is a new evolution, that Mariko will bear the real Mitochondrial Eve, and that the mitochondria controlled all events in Kiyomi's life that led to this point, including manipulating her to fall in love with Nagashima. Nagashima calls out to Kiyomi as the creature tells him to go away and sets his arms on fire. Nagashima continues forwards and embraces Kiyomi, and they both erupt into flames. Takashi arrives on the roof and rescues Mariko as the creature and Nagashima continue to burn.

== Cast ==
Cast sourced from the book The Toho Studios Story.

- Hiroshi Mikami as Toshiaki Nagashima
- Riona Hazuki as Kiyomi Nagashima
- Tomoko Nakajima as Sachiko Asakura
- Ayako Omura as Mariko Anzai
- Hisako Manda as Etsuko Odagiri
- Noboru Mitani as Mutsuo Ishihara
- Tetsuya Bessho as Takatsugu Yoshizumi

== Production ==
Parasite Eve is based on the 1995 novel of the same name by Hideaki Sena. Sena had a background in pharmacology and his day job consisted of testing mitochondria with drugs to test their ability to convert fatty acids into energy. A television documentary he viewed gave him the idea of the mitochondria having a will of their own and being unwilling to continue their symbiotic relationship. This was the basis for his novel, which was very popular in Japan and was the first book to be awarded the Japan Horror Novel Award. In 1997, Kadokawa Shoten decided to use its film production side of its business to develop a film version of Parasite Eve. It was the company's first film in over three years after a drugs scandal stopped the independent producer making films. Parasite Eve was co-produced by Kadokawa and Fuji TV's Motion Picture Division. The film cost ¥550 million (US$909,000) to make and approximately the same amount to promote.

The group hired Masayuki Ochiai, who in the 1990s had made the television series Night Head for Fuji TV. The screenplay for the film was written by Ryoichi Kimizuka, who had to reorganize the non-linear approach of Sena's novel and edit the technical terms used in the novel to make it appropriate for a screenplay. Director Masayuki Ochiai stated he was "not really happy with the circumstances I was under when I had to create [Parasite Eve] ... First of all I was forced by the producers to make it a love story. There were so many compromises I had to make that it couldn't be a true horror movie." Among the cast was Riona Hazuki, who was best known for her appearances in Japanese television in this period. Ochai stated he looked for someone "who could enact the sensitivity of the character. i found that quality within Hazuki." Due to her popularity, Ochiai was concerned her fans would just go to see her nude in the film. To avoid this, he was inspired by a manga by Osamu Tezuka that involved men-hating women who were set to take over the world. Tezuka drew these women without nipples, an idea Ochiai used for Hazuki in the film, feeling it would make her "sexual" and "bizarre and horrific without being exploitative". Parasite Eve took eight weeks to film.

== Release ==
Parasite Eve was released theatrically in Japan, where it was distributed by Toho, on February 1, 1997. The film received a relatively limited theatrical release in Japan and was not widely distributed overseas. Variety projected the film would take ¥100 million (US$826, 446) during its five-week run in about 150 Japanese theaters. The film grossed a total of ¥490 million domestically. It was not among the highest-grossing Japanese film productions of the year, with live-action films Lost Paradise grossing ¥2.3 billion and School Ghost Stories 3 grossing ¥1.15 billion.

In 2001, Parasite Eve was shown at the Grauman's Egyptian Theatre in Los Angeles, California, as part of the "Japanese Outlaw Masters 3: The New Generation" series. It was screened alongside Uzumaki (2000) and Cat Soup (2001). Parasite Eve was released with English subtitles in the United States by A.D. Vision on August 31, 1998; the same company released it on DVD and VHS on August 14, 2001.

== Reception ==
Academic Colette Balmain said Parasite Eve is often being overlooked due its limited distribution in Japan and overseas in comparison to Hideo Nakata's Ring. According to Balmain, it was a key film in the J-horror boom of the late 1990s and early 2000s, and has similar plot threads to The Ring's sequel Spiral (1998), which contains similar themes of genetic disaster due to science running amok. Balmain praised the "evocative score" by Joe Hisaishi and the acting of Hiroshi Mikami, and said the film succeeds better as a text "about mourning and melancholia" rather than a horror film, which she said has a "relatively slow pace" and "not so special effects".

Aaron Gerow reviewed the film in The Daily Yomiuri, describing it as "mildly enjoyable at times" but said it "whitewashes the novel" and that "creativity is lacking and all of it seems too much like an overblown TV drama". An anonymous reviewer in Fangoria described Parasite Eve as a "flawed but fascinating" film that is "held together by Ochiai's assured style and plenty of unsettling moments". The review concluded Ochiai "maintains a dead-serious tone in the face of rampant silliness" and that the film is "an accomplished debut, proving that Ochiai is one of the more original forces in new Japanese cinema".

== See also ==
- List of Japanese films of 1997
- List of science fiction films of the 1990s
