= Sakae Ōba =

Imperial Japanese Army officer

- 大場 栄
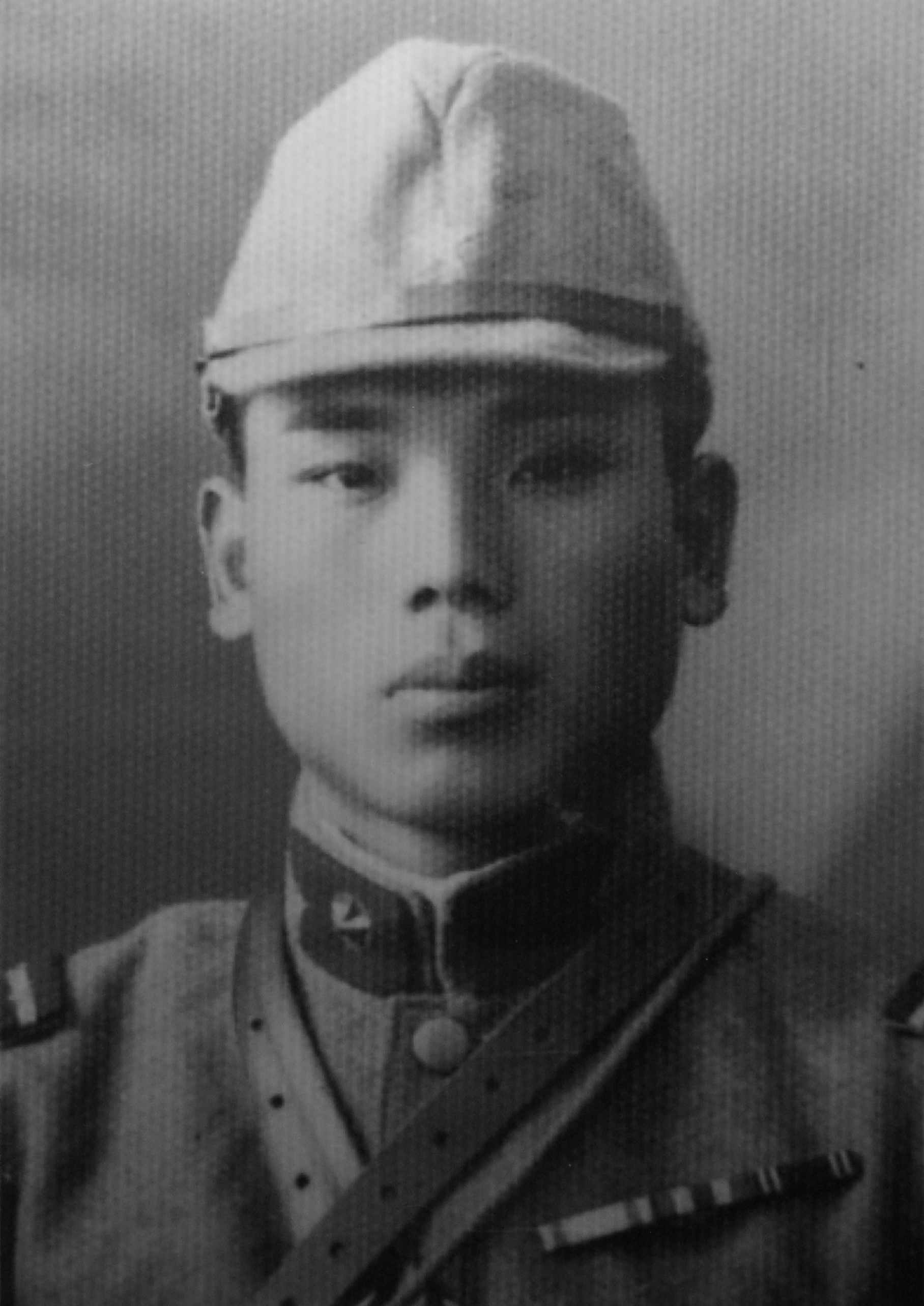
- Oba, c. 1937
- Born: 21 March 1914; Gamagori, Aichi
- Died: 8 June 1992 (aged 78); Gamagori, Aichi
- Relatives: Mineko Oba, wife
- Military career
- Allegiance: Empire of Japan
- Branch: Imperial Japanese Army
- Service years: 1934–1945
- Rank: Captain
- Nickname: The Fox
- Unit: 18th Infantry Regiment
- Conflicts: Battle of Shanghai; Battle of Saipan
- Awards: Order of the Golden Kite Fifth Class Order of the Rising Sun, Fifth Class
- Other work: Maruei Department Store Company, Board of Directors; Gamagori, Aichi: City Council

Sakae Ōba (大場 栄, Ōba Sakae; 21 March 1914 – 8 June 1992) was an officer of the Imperial Japanese Army during World War II. He served in both China and in the Pacific campaign. After Japanese forces were defeated in the Battle of Saipan, he led a group of soldiers and civilians deep into the jungle to evade capture by Allied forces. Under Ōba's leadership, the group survived for over a year after the battle and finally surrendered in December 1945, three months after the war had ended. Following his return to Japan, he became a successful businessman and served on the city council of Gamagōri.

== Early life ==
Sakae Ōba was born on 21 March 1914 in the town of Gamagori, Aichi prefecture. He was the first son of Isuke Ōba, a farmer. In March 1933, Ōba graduated from the Aichi Prefecture Teacher Training School of Practical Education (愛知県実業教員養成所) and the following month he accepted a faculty position at a public school in the area. While working as a teacher, he married Mineko Hirano (1912–1992), also of Gamagori.

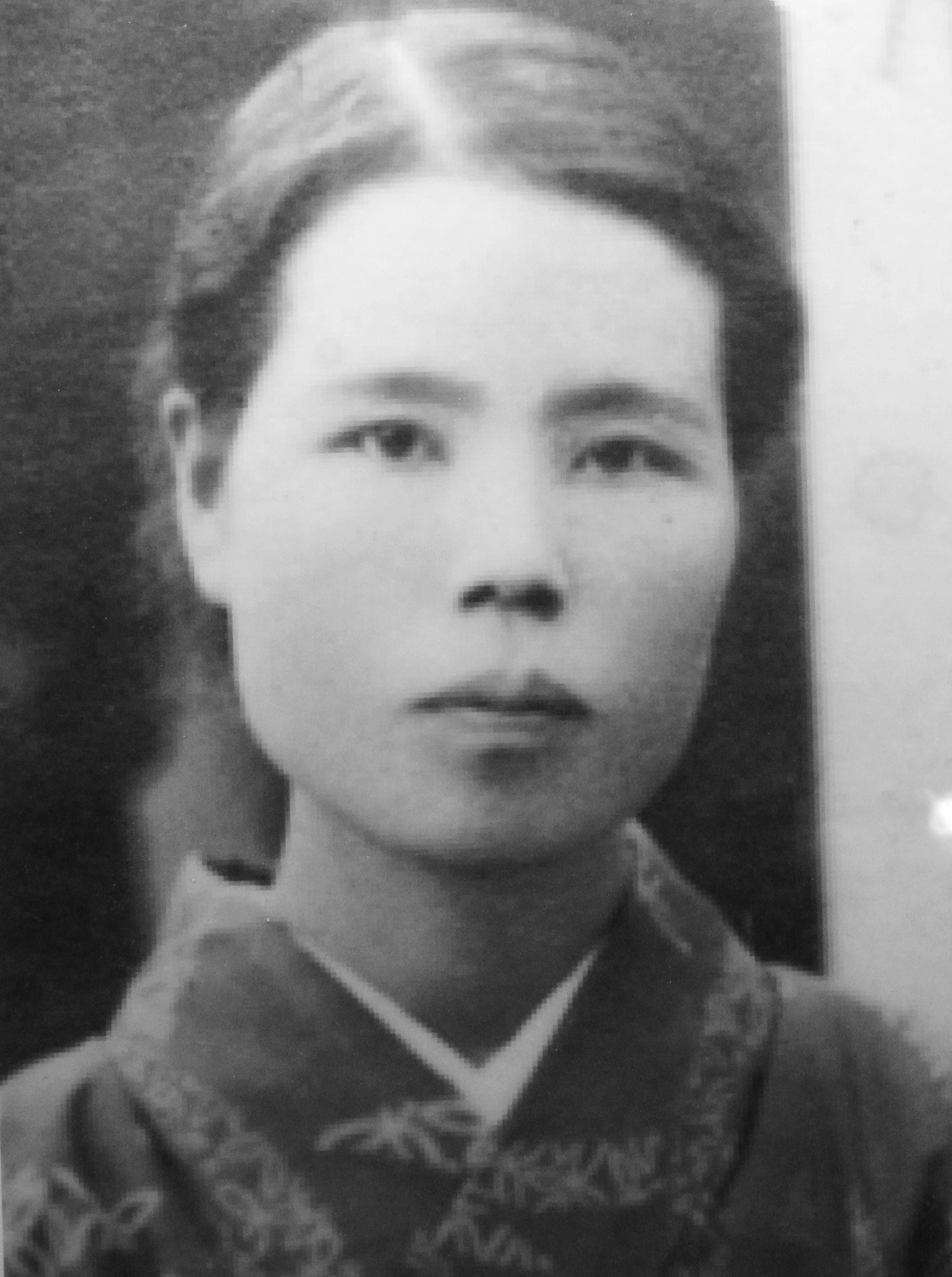
Mineko Oba, c. 1937

== Military career ==
In 1934, Ōba joined the 18th Infantry Regiment of the Imperial Japanese Army, based in the nearby city of Toyohashi. He was designated a Ground Officer Candidate, First Class, received specialized training, and was sent to Manchukuo, where the bulk of the 18th Regiment was already stationed on occupation duty. In 1936, the regiment returned to its home garrison in Toyohashi, and Ōba was briefly reunited with his wife.

In July 1937, the Second Sino-Japanese War erupted, and the 18th Infantry was mobilized. In August, Ōba and his regiment were deployed to China where they joined the amphibious invasion of Shanghai. By December of that year, Ōba had been promoted to second lieutenant. In 1939, he was promoted to first lieutenant, and in November 1941 he was given command of an infantry company. In March 1943 he was promoted to captain.

=== Saipan ===
Early in 1944, the 18th Regiment was pulled out of Manchuria and re-deployed to the Pacific Theatre. Captain Ōba was placed in charge of the regiment's company of combat medics. At about 3:00pm, 29 February, the transport ship carrying the regiment, the Sakito Maru, was struck by a torpedo fired by the American submarine USS Trout, near the island of Saipan. The ship sank, taking with it over half the regiment. Escort vessels moved in quickly and rescued about 1,800 survivors and delivered them to Saipan. After hasty reorganization, most of the regiment was successfully transported to Guam. Almost 600 troops, including Captain Ōba, had to be left behind on Saipan. Ōba was assigned to organize a 225-man medical company composed of tankers, engineers, and medics that survived the Sakito-maru disaster. They obtained what few medical supplies were available and by mid-May had set up a medical aid station.

On the morning of 15 June 1944, United States Marines landed on the beaches for the Battle of Saipan. Despite a fierce defense, the Japanese were gradually pushed back with heavy losses. The Japanese commander used Mount Tapochau at the center of the island as headquarters and organized defensive lines around the mountain. With no re-supply or relief available, the situation became untenable for the defenders, and a final attack was ordered. On 7 July, Captain Ōba and his men participated in the largest banzai charge of the war in the Pacific. After 15 hours of intense and unrelenting hand to hand combat, almost 4,300 Japanese soldiers were dead. Allied forces declared the island secured on 9 July 1944. By 30 September 1944, the Japanese Army made an official presumption of death for all personnel of unknown status and they were declared killed in action. That included Captain Ōba, and he was awarded a "posthumous" promotion to major.

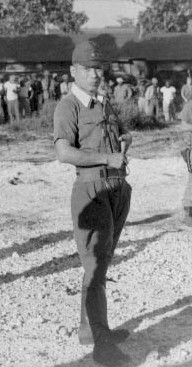
Captain Ōba, 1 December 1945

==== Holdout ====
In reality, Captain Ōba survived the battle and gradually took command of over a hundred other soldiers. Only five men from his original unit survived the battle, two of whom died in the following months. Ōba then led over 200 Japanese civilians deeper into the jungles to evade capture. He and his men organized the civilians and placed them in mountain caves and hidden jungle villages. When the soldiers were not assisting the civilians with survival tasks, Captain Ōba and his men continued their battle against the garrison of U.S. Marines. Ōba used Mount Tapochau as their primary base; at 473 meters (1,552 ft), the peak offered an unobstructed 360-degree view of the island. From their base camp on the western slope of the mountain, Ōba and his men occasionally conducted guerrilla-style raids on American positions. Due to the speed and stealth of these operations, and the frustrated attempts to find him, the Marines on Saipan eventually referred to Ōba as "The Fox".

In September 1944, the Marines began conducting patrols in the island's interior, searching for survivors who were raiding their camp for supplies. These patrols sometimes encountered Japanese soldiers or civilians, and when they were captured, they were interrogated and sent to an appropriate prison camp. It was during these interrogations that the Marines learned of Ōba's name. At the peak of the hunt for Ōba, the Marine commander devised a plan in which his men would line up across the width of the island, about two meters separating one Marine from the next, and they were to march from the south end of the island to the north. The commander felt that Ōba and his men would have to fight, surrender, or be driven north and eventually captured. Due to this dragnet, the elderly and infirm civilians volunteered to surrender. Although some of the soldiers wanted to fight, Captain Ōba asserted that their primary concerns were to protect the civilians and to stay alive to continue the war. As the line of Marines approached the area, most of the remaining soldiers and civilians climbed up to a concealed mountain clearing, while others stood on narrow ledges and clung to the side of the mountain. They maintained their precarious positions for most of the day, as the Marines crossed through the area, ransacking huts and gardens when they found them. In some places, the Japanese on the ledges were less than 20 feet (6.1 m) above the heads of the Marines. The Marines' search proved futile, and eventually led to the chagrined commander's reassignment.

==== Surrender ====
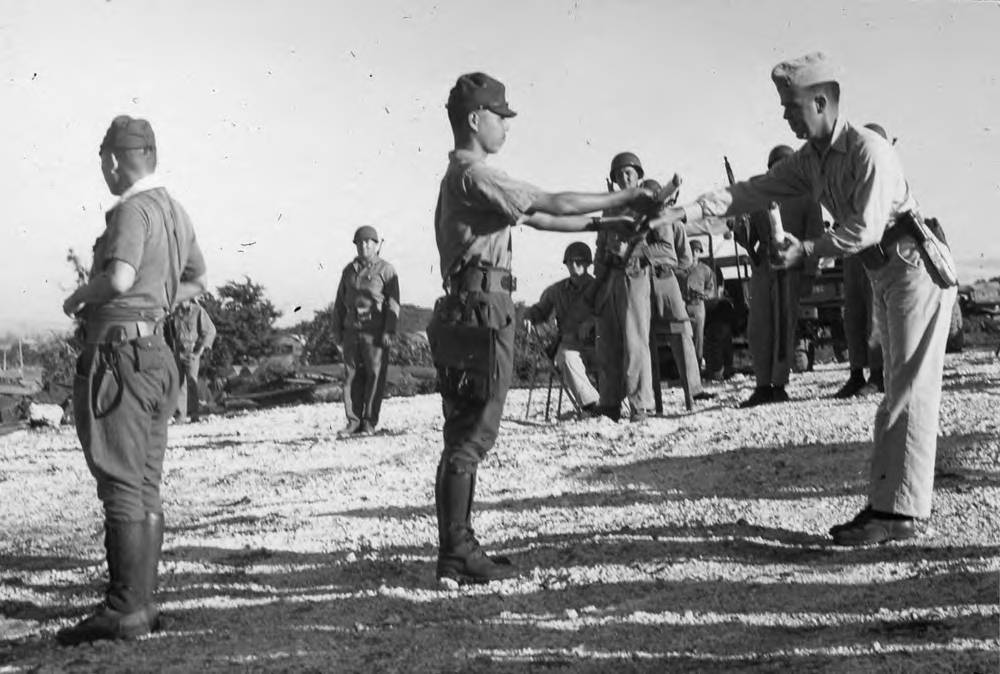
Japanese Imperial Army Captain Sakae Ōba surrenders his Samurai sword to Lieutenant Colonel Howard G. Kirgis, USMC, at Saipan, Mariana Islands on Saturday morning, December 1, 1945.

Captain Ōba and his men held out on the island for 512 days, or about 16 months. On 27 November 1945, former Major General Umahachi Amō, commander of the 9th Independent Mixed Brigade during the Battle of Saipan, was able to draw out some of the Japanese in hiding by singing the anthem of the Japanese infantry branch. Amō was then able to present documents from the defunct Imperial General Headquarters to Captain Ōba ordering him and his 46 remaining men to surrender themselves to the Americans.

On 1 December 1945, three months after the official surrender of Japan, the Japanese soldiers gathered once more on Mt. Tapochau and sang a song of departure to the spirits of the war dead. Ōba then led his people out of the jungle and they presented themselves to the Marines of the 18th Anti-Aircraft Artillery Company. With great formality and commensurate dignity, Captain Ōba surrendered his sword to Lieutenant Colonel Howard G. Kirgis, and his men surrendered their arms and colors. They were the last organized resistance of Japanese forces on Saipan.

== Post-war ==
After the Japanese government confirmed that Ōba was alive on Saipan, his "posthumous" promotion was rescinded. Following his release from Allied custody, he was repatriated. Once back in Japan, Ōba was reunited with his wife and met his son for the first time; the child had been born in 1937, just after his father had left for China. Ōba was hired by the Maruei Department Store Company in 1952, where he was employed as a representative and spokesman for the board of directors until 1992. From 1967 until 1979, Ōba served on the city council in the town of Gamagori, in Aichi Prefecture.

Don Jones, a former U.S. Marine stationed on Saipan and once part of a group ambushed by Ōba's men, was intrigued by the story of the Japanese holdouts and sought out Ōba after the war. With Ōba's cooperation, Jones wrote a book about his experiences on Saipan (detailed below). Jones became a lifelong friend of the Ōba family, and went so far as to locate the retired LtCol Kirgis, to whom Ōba surrendered in 1945, and asked if he could return the sword that Ōba had handed over when he surrendered. Kirgis agreed, and Jones took the sword to Japan where he presented it to his grateful friend. The heirloom sword remains in the possession of the Ōba family.

Ōba Sakae died on 8 June 1992, at the age of 78. His remains were interred in the Ōba family grave at Kou'un Temple in Gamagori.

== Literature and film ==
The collaborative effort between Ōba and Don Jones resulted in a novelized account that was first translated into Japanese and published in 1982. It became a popular success, and the English version was published in 1986 under the title Oba, The Last Samurai: Saipan 1944–1945.

In May 2010, Sakae Ōba's second son, Hisamitsu, discovered more than 1,200 pages of letters and postcards written between his parents Sakae and Mineko, most dated between 1937 and 1941, though some are dated as late as 1944. Hisamitsu showed the letters to his cousin, Keiichiro Hirano, (Note: According to Sato (2010), Mineko Ōba's brother's grandson is Keiichiro Hirano. Hisamitsu and Keiichiro are thus first cousins, once removed (See Culbertson, Fredd (1997) Cousin Relationships)) a novelist and the 1998 recipient of the prestigious Akutagawa Prize. Hirano was deeply moved by what he read in the wartime correspondence, and helped find a local publisher. They offered the task of publication to Mari Mizutani, of Toyohashi, who has stated that she believes the letters are especially significant for their detailed descriptions of daily life during the war; while both husband and wife wrote of their deep affection for each other, both also wrote about innumerable daily activities, Mineko in Gamagori and Ōba in China or on occupation duty in Manchuria, prior to being shipped to the Pacific. The letters were reviewed by a panel of local volunteers, most of whom had a professional background in literature, publication, history, or were somehow tied to local affairs. A selection of the letters has been compiled and was published in January 2011 under the title Senka no rabu retah, or Love Letters from the Fires of War.

On 11 February 2011, the film Taiheiyō no kiseki – fokksu to yobareta otoko (太平洋の奇跡−フォックスと呼ばれた男−, or, Miracle of the Pacific: The Man Called Fox (also titled "Oba: The Last Samurai")) was released in theaters, portraying the struggles of Ōba and his group on Saipan, as well as the Marines' relentless manhunt. It was produced by Toho Pictures, under the direction of Hideyuki Hirayama; involved production units from Japan, the United States, and Thailand; and stars Yutaka Takenouchi as Cpt. Sakae Ōba. In preparation for the role, Takenouchi met with Hisamitsu Ōba and the two of them paid their respects at the grave of Sakae Ōba. The movie received favorable reviews from critics.

== See also ==
- 18th Infantry Regiment (Imperial Japanese Army)
- Japanese holdout

== Bibliography ==
- Ando, Satoshi (August 25, 2010). 大場大尉夫妻の"戦火のラブレター"校正進む [Proceeding with the Review of "The Love Letters from the Fires of War" of Captain Oba and his Wife]. East Aichi Newspaper (in Japanese). Japan.
- Gailey, Harry (1988). The Liberation of Guam 21 July – 10 August. Novato, CA: Presidio Press. ISBN 0-89141-651-X.
- Hata, Ikuhiko (2005). 日本陸海軍総合事典 [Comprehensive Encyclopedia of the Japanese Army and Navy] (in Japanese) (2 ed.). Tokyo: Tokyo University Press.
- Hoyt, Edwin P. (1980). To the Marianas: War in the Central Pacific: 1944. New York: Van Nostrand Reinhold Company. ISBN 9780442261054.
- Jones, Don (1982). タッポーチョ―「敵ながら天晴」大場隊の勇戦512日 [Tapochau, or In Praise of My Enemy: The Oba Unit and 512 Days' of Gallant Struggle] (in Japanese). Sadamu Nakamura (trans.). Tokyo: Shodensha Publishing Co. ASIN B000J7FUHW.
- Jones, Don (1986). Oba, The Last Samurai: Saipan 1944-1945. Presidio Press. ISBN 0-89141-245-X.
- Kuipers, Richard (27 February 2011). "Oba, the Last Samurai". . Reed Business.
- Sato, Yoshihisa (August 23, 2010). 戦火のラブレター出版目指す [Aiming to Publish Love Letters from the Fires of War]. Tonichi Shinbun (in Japanese). Toyohashi, Japan: Tokai-nichi Nichi-shinbun Publishers. News & Topics. Archived from the original on October 6, 2011.
