= Satoko Okudera =

Japanese screenwriter (born 1966)

- 奥寺 佐渡子
- Born: February 16, 1966 (age 60); Iwate Prefecture, Japan
- Occupation: Screenwriter
- Years active: 1993 – present

Satoko Okudera (奥寺 佐渡子, Okudera Satoko; born 1966) is a Japanese screenwriter. She is known for her screenplays in both live-action and anime media. Her 1995 screenplay for School Ghost Stories was nominated for the Japan Academy Film Prize. She is best known for her collaborations with anime director Mamoru Hosoda.

== Career ==
A graduate of the Literature Department of Tokai University in Tokyo, Okudera did not originally consider a career in screenwriting. Instead, she worked for an oil company until 1991, after which she quit her job and became a full-time writer. After over a decade of work in live-action film and television, Okudera was offered her first animation project: adapting Yasutaka Tsutsui's novel The Girl Who Leapt Through Time for director Mamoru Hosoda. The resulting film received worldwide acclaim and gave her international recognition upon its release in 2006. Okudera again collaborated with Hosoda on his 2009 and 2012 films Summer Wars and Wolf Children.

== Awards ==
- Mainichi Film Awards Best Screenplay – Moving (1993) nominated
- Japan Academy Film Prize Screenplay of the Year – School Ghost Stories (1995) nominated
- Tokyo Anime Awards Best Screenplay – The Girl Who Leapt Through Time (2006) winner, Summer Wars (2009) winner

== Works ==
- Moving (1993)
- Human Scramble -RAIN- (1993)
- Playing with Good Children (1994)
- School Ghost Stories (1995)
- Gakkō no Kaidan 2 (1996)
- Gakkō no Kaidan 4 (1999)
- Konsento (2001)
- Samurai Resurrection (2003)
- Hana (2003)
- OLDK. (2004)
- Tenshi (2006)
- The Girl Who Leapt Through Time (2006)
- Talk Talk Talk (2007)
- Kaidan (2007)
- Miyori no Mori (2007)
- Summer Wars (2009)
- Permanent Nobara (2010)
- Rebirth (2011)
- The Egoists (2011)
- The Princess and the Pilot (2011)
- Wolf Children (2012)
- Kiki's Delivery Service (2014)
- The Vancouver Asahi (2014)
- Maestro! (2015)
- Cafe Funiculi Funicula (2018)
- Watashi, Teiji de Kaerimasu (2019)
- Kokuho (2025)
- Lost 10 (2026)
