= Three for the Road (2007 film) =

- Film poster

Japanese name
- Kanji: やじきた道中てれすこ
Transcriptions
- Revised Hepburn: Yajikita Dōchū Teresuko
- Directed by: Hideyuki Hirayama
- Written by: Teruo Abe
- Produced by: Suguru Kubota; Haruhito Nakayoshi; Koichi Ueyama; Satoshi Kono; Tetsuo Sasho; Atsushi Watanabe
- Starring: Kanzaburo Nakamura; Akira Emoto; Kyōko Koizumi
- Cinematography: Kōzō Shibasaki
- Edited by: Akimasa Kawashima
- Music by: Goro Yasukawa
- Distributed by: Shochiku
- Release date: July 11, 2007 (Japan)
- Running time: 108 minutes
- Country: Japan
- Language: Japanese

Three for the Road (Japanese: やじきた道中てれすこ, Hepburn: Yajikita Dōchū Teresuko) is a 2007 Japanese film directed by Hideyuki Hirayama.

== Plot ==
A courtesan (Okino) is tired of her life in Edo, and is starting to be outshone by younger women, so she tricks a man (Yaji) into helping her escape the brothel where she is bound by contract to stay. Okino claims that her father is dying of "hearth trouble" and she needs to visit him right away. The two pair up with an actor (Kita) who made a mess of a scene in a popular kabuki play and so cannot show his face in Edo, and the three set out to find her father.

They meet with various adventures along the way to Okino's hometown. The rakugo story of Teresuko is intertwined with their tale, possibly referring to various kinds of trickery played by the characters on each other in trying to better their lives.

== Cast ==
- Kanzaburo Nakamura as Yajirobee
- Akira Emoto as Kitahachi
- Kyōko Koizumi as Okino
- LaSalle Ishii as Umehachi
- Naomi Fujiyama as Osen
- Koji Kikkawa as Seijuro
- Matsunosuke Shofukutei as Yohei
- Keiko Awaji as Osan
