= Maria's Stomach =

- DVD cover

Japanese name
- Kanji: マリアの胃袋
Transcriptions
- Revised Hepburn: Maria no Ibukuro
- Directed by: Hideyuki Hirayama
- Written by: Takuya Nishioka
- Starring: Haruko Sagara; Akira Emoto; Makoto Otake
- Cinematography: Mutsuo Naganuma
- Edited by: Isao Tomita
- Music by: Higashio Inagaki
- Production companies: Suntory; Director's Company
- Distributed by: Argo Pictures
- Release date: July 21, 1990 (Japan)
- Running time: 104 minutes
- Country: Japan
- Language: Japanese

Maria's Stomach (Japanese: マリアの胃袋, Hepburn: Maria no Ibukuro) is a 1990 Japanese horror film directed by Hideyuki Hirayama.

== Cast ==
- Haruko Sagara as Shoko
- Akira Emoto as Eshima
- Makoto Otake as Yasui
- Bunjaku Han as Maria
