= Talk Talk Talk (film) =

Talk, Talk, Talk
- DVD cover

Japanese name
- Kanji: しゃべれども しゃべれども
Transcriptions
- Revised Hepburn: Shaberedomo Shaberedomo
- Directed by: Hideyuki Hirayama
- Screenplay by: Satoko Okudera
- Story by: Takao Sato
- Produced by: Shinji Ogawa; Atsushi Watanabe
- Starring: Taichi Kokubun; Karina; Yutaka Matsushige
- Cinematography: Junichi Fujisawa
- Edited by: Chieko Suzaki
- Music by: Goro Yasukawa
- Production companies: J Storm; Shinchosha; SKY Perfect Well Think; Yomiuri Shimbun Company; Nippon Television; Asmik Ace Entertainment
- Release date: May 26, 2007 (Japan)
- Running time: 109 minutes
- Country: Japan
- Language: Japanese

Talk, Talk, Talk (Japanese: しゃべれども しゃべれども, Hepburn: Shaberedomo Shaberedomo) is a 2007 Japanese youth romantic drama film directed by Hideyuki Hirayama.

== Cast ==
- Taichi Kokubun as Mitsuba Konjakutei
- Karina as Satsuki Tokawa
- Yutaka Matsushige as Taichi Yugawara
- Yuki Morinaga as Suguru Murabayashi
- Kaoru Yachigusa as Haruko Toyama
- Shirō Itō as Kosanmon Konjakutei
