= Masakane Yonekura =

Japanese stage director, actor, author and illustrator (1934–2014)

- Born: 10 July 1934; Fukuoka, Japan
- Died: 26 August 2014 (aged 80); Fukuoka, Japan
- Occupation: Actor
- Years active: 1957–2014

Masakane Yonekura (Japanese: 米倉 斉加年; 7 October 1934 – 26 August 2014) was a Japanese stage director, actor, author, and illustrator who was one of the central members of the Gekidan Mingei theatre company.

== Death ==
On 26 August 2014, Yonekura died of an abdominal aortic aneurysm rupture. He was 80.

== Filmography ==
=== Film ===
- Brave Records of the Sanada Clan (1963) as Nezu Jinpachi
- Zatoichi Meets Yojimbo (1970)
- Kanashimi no Belladonna (1973)
- Aitsu ni Koishite (1987)
- Hope and Pain (1988)
- Gakkō no Kaidan 2 (1996)
- Always Sanchōme no Yūhi '64 (2012), as Rintarō Chagawa
- The Little House (2014)

=== Television ===
- Kunitori Monogatari (1973) as Takenaka Hanbei
- Katsu Kaishū (1974) as Sakuma Shōzan
- Kaze to Kumo to Niji to (1976) as Ōkiyō
- Shiroi Kyotō (1978) as Noboru Kikukawa
- Haru no Hatō (1985) as Itagaki Taisuke
- Hideyoshi (1996) as Imagawa Yoshimoto
- Clouds Over the Hill (2009–11) as Ōyama Iwao
