= The Laughing Frog =

2002 Japanese film by Hideyuki Hirayama

- Theatrical release poster

Japanese name
- Kanji: 笑う蛙
Transcriptions
- Revised Hepburn: Warau Kaeru
- Directed by: Hideyuki Hirayama
- Screenplay by: Izuru Narushima
- Based on: Warau Kaeru by Yoshinaga Fujita
- Starring: Kyōzō Nagatsuka; Nene Otsuka; Mickey Curtis
- Cinematography: Kōzō Shibasaki
- Edited by: Akimasa Kawashima
- Music by: Ryuji Murayama (score); Shigeru Izumiya (songs)
- Production companies: Office Shirous; Eisei Gekijo; VAP, Inc.; Japan Home Video; Hakuhodo; Nippan Group Holdings; Wako
- Release date: July 6, 2002 (Japan)
- Running time: 96 minutes
- Country: Japan
- Language: Japanese

The Laughing Frog (Japanese: 笑う蛙, Hepburn: Warau Kaeru) is a 2002 Japanese film directed by Hideyuki Hirayama. It was adapted from the novel of the same name by Yoshinaga Fujita.

== Cast ==
- Kyōzō Nagatsuka as Ippei Kurasawa
- Nene Otsuka as Ryoko Kurasawa
- Mickey Curtis as Kiichiro Aisawa
- Jun Kunimura as Akio Yoshizumi
- Kitarō as Kentaro Inamatsu
- Shuzo Mitamura as Keiji Uzaki
- Kumija Kim as Sakiko Inamatsu
- Kaho Minami as Takako Motoyoshi
- Izumi Yukimura as Sanae Inamatsu

== Awards ==
24th Yokohama Film Festival

- Won: Best Director - Hideyuki Hirayama
- Won: Best Cinematography
- Won: Best Actor - Kyōzō Nagatsuka
- Won: Best Supporting Actress - Nene Otsuka
- 7th Best Film
