= Begging for Love =

- DVD cover for Begging for Love (1998)
- Directed by: Hideyuki Hirayama
- Written by: Harumi Shimoda (novel); Wui Sin Chong (screenplay)
- Produced by: Tadamichi Abe; Sadatoshi Fujimine; Hideyuki Takai
- Starring: Mieko Harada; Maho Nonami; Fumiyo Kohinata; Mami Kumagai; Jun Kunimura
- Cinematography: Kōzō Shibasaki
- Edited by: Akimasa Kawashima
- Music by: Akira Senju
- Distributed by: Toho
- Release date: 26 September 1998 (Japan)
- Running time: 135 minutes
- Country: Japan
- Languages: Japanese; Taiwanese Hokkien

Begging for Love (Japanese: 愛を乞うひと, Hepburn: Ai o Kou Hito) is a 1998 Japanese drama film directed by Hideyuki Hirayama. It was Japan's submission to the 71st Academy Awards for the Academy Award for Best Foreign Language Film, but was not accepted as a nominee. It was chosen as Best Film at the Japan Academy Prize ceremony.

== Cast ==
- Mieko Harada: Terue Yamaoka
- Maho Nonami: Migusa Yamaoka
- Fumiyo Kohinata
- Mami Kumagai
- Jun Kunimura: Saburo Wachi
- Naomi Nishida
- Tsuyoshi Ujiki: Takenori Wachi
- Yuji Nakamura
- Moro Morooka
- Kiichi Nakai: Fumio Chin
- Ai Koinuma: Terue Yamaoka, aged 5

== 2017 television drama remake ==
A television special drama (tanpatsu) remake, starring Ryoko Shinohara, Alice Hirose, Takaya Kamikawa and Rio Suzuki, was broadcast on NTV on 11 January 2017.

== See also ==
- Cinema of Japan
- List of submissions to the 71st Academy Awards for Best Foreign Language Film
- List of Japanese submissions for the Academy Award for Best Foreign Language Film
