= Lady Joker =

- DVD cover
- Directed by: Hideyuki Hirayama
- Screenplay by: Wui-Sin Chong
- Based on: Lady Joker by Kaoru Takamura
- Produced by: Yoshinori Fujita; Satoshi Fukushima; Kiyoyuki Ishihara; Keizō Shukuzaki; Minoru Yokote
- Starring: Tetsuya Watari; Satoshi Tokushige; Koji Kikkawa; Jun Kunimura; Miho Kanno
- Cinematography: Kōzō Shibasaki
- Edited by: Akimasa Kawashima
- Music by: Goro Yasukawa
- Release date: 11 December 2004 (Japan)
- Running time: 121 minutes
- Country: Japan
- Language: Japanese

Lady Joker (Japanese: レディ・ジョーカー) is a 2004 Japanese film directed by Hideyuki Hirayama, based on the two-part magnum opus novel by Kaoru Takamura.

== Overview ==
Japanese detective thriller inspired by a real life unresolved 1980s kidnapping of a president of a Japanese candy company.

== Cast ==
- Tetsuya Watari as Seizo Monoi
- Satoshi Tokushige as Yuichiro Gouda
- Koji Kikkawa as Shuhei Handa
- Jun Kunimura as Satoru Hirose
- Ren Osugi as Junichi Nunokawa
- Mitsuru Fukikoshi as Katsumi Ko
- Haruhiko Kato as Yokichi Matsudo
- Miho Kanno as Yoshiko Shiroyama
- Ittoku Kishibe as Seiichi Shirai
- Kyozo Nagatsuka as Kyohei Shiroyama
