= The Guard from Underground =

- DVD cover
- 地獄の警備員
- Directed by: Kiyoshi Kurosawa
- Written by: Kunihiro Tomioka; Kiyoshi Kurosawa
- Produced by: Susumu Miyasaka; Takashi Ikoma
- Starring: Makiko Kuno; Hatsunori Hasegawa; Yutaka Matsushige; Ren Osugi
- Cinematography: Kenichi Negishi
- Music by: Yuichi Kishino; Midori Funakoshi
- Production companies: Director's Company; Nichiei Agency
- Release date: June 13, 1992 (Japan)
- Running time: 97 minutes
- Country: Japan
- Language: Japanese

The Guard from Underground (Japanese: 地獄の警備員, Hepburn: Jigoku no Keibiin; lit. The Guard from Hell), also known as The Security Guard from Hell, is a 1992 Japanese slasher film directed by Kiyoshi Kurosawa. It was released in Japan on June 13, 1992.

== Plot ==
Akiko Narushima has just begun a new job consulting on art purchases for a large corporation. Her first day coincides with the first day of a hulking new security guard named Fujimaru, who is secretly a disgraced former sumo wrestler currently being re-investigated for the murder of his cheating lover and friend (and having narrowly avoided jail with an insanity plea during his first trial). At first, Akiko's days are complicated only by her uncertainty about her new job and by her lecherous manager, Kurume. But when Fujimaru finds an earring lost by Akiko, he begins wearing the earring and becomes obsessed with her, eventually leading him to shut down the electricity and phones in the office and embark on a murderous rampage. Trapped in the building with a killer, Akiko and her co-workers try to stay alive and get help from the outside world. Eventually, Fujimaru traps Akiko in the office of the eccentric Mr. Hyodo. He incapacitates Hyodo and confronts Akiko, who asks him to explain his actions. He makes a series of cryptic statements, giving Hyodo time to revive and strike him in the neck with the broken blade of a paper cutter. Grievously injured, Fujimaru tears Akiko's earring from his own ear and asks that she remember him before stumbling off. After Akiko and Hyodo are safely out of the building, police discover that he has hanged himself in the building's basement, where Akiko had earlier found an improvised shrine with her face on it.

== Cast ==
- Makiko Kuno as Akiko Narushima
- Yutaka Matsushige as Fujimaru
- Hatsunori Hasegawa as Hyodo
- Ren Osugi as Kurume
- Tarô Suwa as Yoshioka

== Reception ==
The film has been described as an early example of director Kiyoshi Kurosawa's distinct directorial style.

Writing for the Japanese-cinema website Midnight Eye, reviewer Nicholas Rucka commented that "notwithstanding the low-budget nature of the film, it brims with atmosphere." Rouven Linnarz of the website Asian Movie Pulse, wrote "Of course, in comparison to later works this film has many flaws, missed opportunities, especially since its last half is too much embedded within the conventions of slasher. However, the film holds more than just a promise, and within Kurosawa’s body of work it is a small, but significant piece of work.". J. Doyle Wallis of DVD Talk was less positive, calling the film "a b-grade slasher picture that probably wouldn't have any attention whatsoever if it hand't been made by a filmmaker who went on to establish some cult success. ...a fair to sub-standard film made by a talented director in their emerging, less polished days."

It was chosen as the 10th best film at the 2nd Japan Film Professional Awards in 1993.
