= Watashi, Teiji de Kaerimasu =

2018 Japanese novel by Kaeruko Akeno

- Author: Kaeruko Akeno
- Original title: わたし、定時で帰ります。
- Language: Japanese
- Genre: Fiction
- Publisher: Shinchosha
- Publication date: 2018
- Publication place: Japan
- Pages: 360
- ISBN: 9784103516415

Watashi, Teiji de Kaerimasu, subtitled No Working After Hours!, is a 2018 novel by Japanese writer Kaeruko Akeno. The story follows the life of a woman who refuses to follow the working habits of her coworkers and bosses. The book and its sequel were adapted by Satoko Okudera into a 2019 TBS television drama starring Yuriko Yoshitaka that drew international attention for its criticisms of Japanese corporate life.

== Plot ==
After growing up with a father whose corporate life meant that he did not spend time with his family, office worker Yui Higashiyama decides that she will never work overtime, and regularly leaves work at the official end of the day. This places her in conflict with other employees, who usually stay at work until much later, and with her bosses at the company, who see her refusal to work overtime as a lack of commitment to the company and its clients. Her situation is complicated by the arrival of an ex-boyfriend who joins the company. Higashiyama gradually convinces her fellow workers to go home on time in order to save their health and relationships, but ends up breaking her original commitment, which results in her hospitalization and the demise of her own relationship with her fiancé.

== Publication and reception ==
During a period of high unemployment, Kaeruko Akeno worked at a "black company" that placed excessive demands on its employees. Her negative experiences and her disapproval of the work habits of career employees inspired the character of Yui Higashiyama. The story was originally serialized in the Shinchosha magazine Yom yom. On March 30, 2018, it was published by Shinchosha in a single volume. The Sankei Shimbun reviewed the book as an "editor's recommendation", with the editor noting the book's potential to spark conversations about working life among its readers. A sequel, titled Watashi, Teiji de Kaerimasu HYPER, was released in 2019.

== Television adaptation ==
In 2019, the novel and its sequel were adapted by screenwriter Satoko Okudera into a TBS drama starring Yuriko Yoshitaka as Yui Higashiyama. The show's theme song, "Ambitious", was performed by Japanese band Superfly. A review in The New York Times called the show a "modest television hit" and noted that it had prompted conversations about work-life balance in Japan, but also observed that the television adaptation had a much more positive ending than the original novel. Writing for The Japan Times, reviewer Philip Brasor criticized the show for letting other workplace issues such as gender discrimination and problematic hierarchies distract from the focus on the titular overwork culture. He felt that equivocating instead of confronting it head-on robbed the show of its most potent critiques of the Japanese work environment. A large earthquake in Niigata Prefecture occurred during the show's final episode, leading the broadcast to be suspended halfway through the episode and rescheduled for a later date.
