= Human Scramble -RAIN- =

- Theatrical release poster

Japanese name
- Kanji: 人間交差点 雨
Transcriptions
- Revised Hepburn: Ningen Kōsaten: Ame
- Directed by: Hideyuki Hirayama
- Screenplay by: Satoko Okudera
- Based on: Human Crossing by Masao Yajima
- Produced by: Taro Maki; Atsuyuki Shimoda; Hijiri Taguchi
- Starring: Kenjiro Nashimoto; Tomoko Otakara; Yumiko Fujita
- Cinematography: Shōhei Andō
- Edited by: Kan Suzuki
- Music by: Harunobu Kawashima
- Distributed by: Pioneer LDC
- Release date: June 5, 1993 (Japan)
- Running time: 70 minutes
- Country: Japan
- Language: Japanese

Human Scramble -RAIN- (Japanese: 人間交差点 雨, Hepburn: Ningen Kōsaten: Ame) is a 1993 Japanese film directed by Hideyuki Hirayama. It is based on the manga Human Crossing by Masao Yajima.

== Cast ==
- Kenjiro Nashimoto as Yohei Nozaki
- Tomoko Otakara as Akemi Kikushima
- Yumiko Fujita as Dir. Kambayashi
