= Kōzō Shibasaki =

Japanese cinematographer (born 1958)

- 柴崎 幸三
- Born: January 30, 1958 (age 68); Tochigi, Japan
- Education: Nihon University
- Occupation: Cinematographer
- Years active: 1981–present
- Awards: 4 Japanese Academy Awards

Kōzō Shibasaki (柴崎 幸三, Shibasaki Kōzō; born January 30, 1958) is a Japanese cinematographer. A member of the Japanese Society of Cinematographers, he is the recipient of four Japanese Academy Awards, three of which were for films directed by acclaimed filmmaker Takashi Yamazaki.

== Life and career ==
Shibasaki was born on January 30, 1958, in Tochigi, Japan. In 1981, Shibasaki graduated from Nihon University's Department of Cinema and began working as a freelance photographer. He made his debut working on The Games Teachers Play (1992). He then moved on to serve as the cinematographer for It's a Summer Vacation Everyday (1994), School Ghost Stories (1995), Haunted School 2 (1996), Parasite Eve (1997), School Ghost Stories 3 (1997), Juvenile (2000), Returner (2002), Out (2002), Lady Joker (2004), Always: Sunset on Third Street (2005), Always: Sunset on Third Street 2 (2007), Three for the Road (2007), K-20: Legend of the Mask (2008), Space Battleship Yamato (2010), Always: Sunset on Third Street '64 (2012), The Eternal Zero (2013), Fueled: The Man They Called Pirate (2016), Close-Knit (2017), The Great War of Archimedes (2019), Yokaipedia (2022), and Godzilla Minus One (2023) as well as its sequel.

== Filmography ==
=== Cinematographer ===
- The Games Teachers Play (1992)
- It's a Summer Vacation Everyday (1994)
- School Ghost Stories (1995)
- School Ghost Stories 2 (1996)
- Parasite Eve (1997)
- School Ghost Stories 3 (1997)
- Begging for Love (1998)
- School Ghost Stories 4 (1999)
- Juvenile (2000)
- Off-Balance (2001)
- Laundry (2002)
- The Laughing Frog (2002)
- Returner (2002)
- Out (2002)
- Ashita ga aru sa: The Movie (2002)
- The Boat to Heaven (2003)
- 69 (2004)
- Lady Joker (2004)
- Love Is Five, Seven, Five! (2005)
- Scrap Heaven (2005)
- Always: Sunset on Third Street (2005)
- Chekeraccho!! (2006)
- Always: Sunset on Third Street 2 (2007)
- Three for the Road (2007)
- After School (2008)
- K-20: Legend of the Mask (2008)
- Ballad (2009)
- Space Battleship Yamato (2010)
- Oba: The Last Samurai (2011)
- Always: Sunset on Third Street '64 (2012)
- The Eternal Zero (2013)
- Ogawacho Serenade (2014)
- I Am a Monk (2015)
- Fueled: The Man They Called Pirate (2016)
- Close-Knit (2017)
- Destiny: The Tale of Kamakura (2017)
- Our Departures (2018)
- The Great War of Archimedes (2019)
- Closed Ward, also known as Family of Strangers (2019)
- Love, Life and Goldfish (2021)
- What Did You Eat Yesterday? (2021)
- Yokaipedia, also known as Ghost Book (2022)
- Modern Love Tokyo (2023, TV series) - 1 episode
- Godzilla Minus One (2023)
- Godzilla Minus Zero (2026)

== Awards ==
Year	Award	Category	Nominated work	Result	Ref.
1999	22nd Japan Academy Film Prize	Best Cinematography	Begging for Love	Won	
2003	24th Yokohama Film Festival	Best Cinematography	Out and The Laughing Frog	Won	
2006	29th Japan Academy Film Prize	Best Cinematography	Always: Sunset on Third Street	Won	
2006	Mainichi Film Concours	Best Cinematography	Always: Sunset on Third Street	Won	
2008	31st Japan Academy Film Prize	Best Cinematography	Always: Sunset on Third Street 2	Nominated	
2015	38th Japan Academy Film Prize	Best Cinematography	The Eternal Zero	Won	
2017	40th Japan Academy Film Prize	Best Cinematography	Fueled: The Man They Called Pirate	Nominated	
2018	41st Japan Academy Film Prize	Best Cinematography	Destiny: The Tale of Kamakura	Nominated	
