= Oba: The Last Samurai =

2011 film

- Film poster
- Directed by: Hideyuki Hirayama
- Screenplay by: Takuya Nishioka; Gregory Marquette; Cellin Gluck
- Based on: Oba, The Last Samurai by Don Jones
- Produced by: Takuya Ito; Nobuyuki Iinuma; Thomas Nelson; Toshio Tanaka
- Starring: Yutaka Takenouchi
- Cinematography: Kōzō Shibasaki
- Edited by: James Munro; Chieko Suzaki
- Music by: Takashi Kako
- Production companies: Cine Bazar; Nippon Television; Protean Image Group; Dentsu
- Distributed by: Toho
- Release date: 11 February 2011 (Japan)
- Running time: 128 minutes
- Country: Japan
- Languages: Japanese; English

Oba: The Last Samurai (Japanese: 太平洋の奇跡 –フォックスと呼ばれた男 –, Hepburn: Taiheiyō no kiseki: Fokkusu to yobareta otoko; i.e. Miracle of the Pacific: The Man Called Fox), also known as Miracle of the Pacific, Battle of the Pacific and Codename: Fox, is a 2011 Japanese World War II Pacific War drama film directed by Hideyuki Hirayama and based on the true story of Captain Sakae Ōba, who together with his survivors held out on the island of Saipan for 512 days.

== Plot ==
During the Battle of Saipan, on 7 July 1944, Captain Sakae Ōba partakes in a final banzai charge against the United States Marine Corps on the island of Saipan. It is the largest banzai charge of the Pacific War, but fails, resulting in over 4,000 Japanese deaths after 15 hours of close combat. American forces declare the island secure on 9 July, while Ōba and a handful of survivors retreat into the jungle and begin a guerrilla-style war using Mount Tapochau as a base due to its natural defensive position and prominent heights overlooking every possible approach.

With only 46 soldiers/sailors and 200 civilians at his disposal, Ōba (nicknamed "the Fox" by the Americans due to his cunning strategy) holds out for 512 days before surrendering on 1 December 1945, having lasted three months after Japan's capitulation following the bombing of Hiroshima and Nagasaki. Ōba marches down from the mountain with his remaining survivors singing “Spirit of Infantry” (an Imperial Japanese army infantry song) and presents his sword to the American commander in a formal and dignified manner, the last organized resistance of Japanese forces of the Second World War.

== Cast ==
- Yutaka Takenouchi as Captain Sakae Ōba ("the Fox")
- Sean McGowan as Captain Lewis
- Ken Mitsuishi as Second Lieutenant Nagata (Military Police)
- Itsuji Itao as Ensign Kinbara (Navy Land Forces)
- Mao Inoue as Chieko Aono
- Takayuki Yamada as Sergeant Major Toshio Kitani
- Tomoko Nakajima as Haruko Okuno
- Yoshinori Okada as Sergeant Saburo Bito
- Sadao Abe as Suekichi Motoki
- Daniel Baldwin as Colonel Pollard
- Treat Williams as Colonel Wessinger
- Toshiaki Karasawa as Private Kesamatsu Horiuchi ("Saipan Tiger")
