= Playing with Good Children =

- DVD cover

Japanese name
- Kanji: よい子と遊ぼう
Transcriptions
- Revised Hepburn: Yoiko to Asobō
- Directed by: Hideyuki Hirayama
- Written by: Satoko Okudera
- Produced by: Takenori Sentō
- Starring: Hirozumi Sato; Shingo Takano; Issey Takahashi
- Cinematography: Akiko Ashizawa
- Edited by: Shuichi Kakesu
- Music by: Shigeru Umebayashi
- Production companies: Wowow; Hill Villa
- Release date: October 15, 1994 (Japan)
- Running time: 43 minutes
- Country: Japan
- Language: Japanese

Playing with Good Children (Japanese: よい子と遊ぼう, Hepburn: Yoiko to Asobō) is a 1994 Japanese horror film directed by Hideyuki Hirayama.

== Cast ==
- Hirozumi Sato as Bingo
- Shingo Takano as Harada
- Issey Takahashi as Namio
