= Forget Me Not (2010 Japanese film) =

- DVD cover

Japanese name
- Kanji: 信さん・炭坑町のセレナーデ
Transcriptions
- Revised Hepburn: Shin-san tankoumachi no serenâde
- Directed by: Hideyuki Hirayama
- Written by: Wui-Sin Chong
- Produced by: Yoshinori Fujita; Shingo Miyauchi
- Starring: Koyuki; Takuya Ishida; Sosuke Ikematsu
- Cinematography: Hiroshi Machida
- Edited by: Chieko Suzaki
- Music by: Gorō Yasukawa
- Production companies: Fellah Pictures; Denkido
- Distributed by: Gold Rush Pictures
- Release date: 27 November 2010 (Japan)
- Running time: 108 minutes
- Country: Japan
- Language: Japanese

Forget Me Not (Japanese: 信さん・炭坑町のセレナーデ, Hepburn: Shin-san tankoumachi no serenāde) is a 2010 Japanese drama film directed by Hideyuki Hirayama, about the people in a small coal mining town in the Fukuoka Prefecture in southern Japan in 1955.

== Cast ==
- Koyuki as Michiyo Tsujiuchi
- Takuya Ishida as Shinichi Nakaoka
- Sosuke Ikematsu as Mamoru Tsujiuchi
- Tokio Emoto as Yong-Nam Lee
- Ken Mitsuishi as Daisuke Nakaoka
- Jun Murakami as Norio Sudo
- Mie Nakao as Kuniko Watanabe
- Ittoku Kishibe as Shigeaki Lee
- Shinobu Otake as Hatsu Nakaoka
