= Teresuko =

Japanese folktale

Creature information
- Other name: Suterenkyou
- Grouping: Folktale
- Sub grouping: Rakugo
- Folklore: Legend

Origin
- First attested: Rakugo tradition (date unknown)
- Known for: Story about naming a mysterious fish, wordplay on raw and dried food names
- Country: Japan
- Habitat: Fishing village (fictional)
- Details: Involves a man claiming names for a fish both raw ("teresuko") and dried ("suterenkyou"); highlights linguistic distinctions in Japanese food terminology.

Teresuko (てれすこ) is a Japanese folktale and is recounted in rakugo, a form of Japanese spoken entertainment. In the story, "teresuko" is the name given to a fish, and "suterenkyou" is the name of this fish when it is dried.

== Plot ==
At a particular fishing place, a strange fish was caught. None of the fishermen knew the name of this fish, so they brought it to the magistrate's office to find out. The officials at the magistrate's office also did not know the name of the fish so, after a discussion, they decided to put up a gyotaku and offer a cash reward to the person who could tell them the name of the fish.

A man then came forward and said that the fish was called "teresuko". The officials were suspicious of this strange name, but since they had no way to confirm or deny it, they reluctantly paid the reward to the man.

The magistrate heard this story, so he dried the fish out and made another gyotaku of it and offered a reward to the person who could name this fish.

The same man came forward and said that this fish was called "suterenkyou".

The magistrate was furious and immediately accused the man of committing the capital offence of trying to defraud the government. The man asked to see his wife and child one more time before he was put to death. When he saw his wife, he said to her, "When our boy grows up, make sure you don't let him call squid 'surume' when it is dried." (In Japanese, raw squid is called "ika". Dried squid is called "surume". The man was making the point that sometimes there are different words for raw foods and dried foods, such as 'beef' and 'jerky'.)

When the magistrate heard this statement, he acquitted the man of the charges and set him free.

The wife had been fasting. This was a contemporary ritual to make a wish come true, in this case to save her husband from his death sentence. Since she had to feed a nursing child, she ate soba powder dissolved in water so that her milk wouldn't dry up, but only that, and abstained from any prepared (e.g. dried) foods.

The "punchline" of this rakugo story is that the man's survival from the dried fish peril was no wonder, because his wife was (coincidentally) abstaining from dried foods.

== In popular culture ==
- The story of Teresuko is recounted in the movie "Three for the Road" (Japanese title: Yajikita Dōchū Teresuko (やじきた道中 てれすこ)).
