= Kyōzō Nagatsuka =

Japanese actor (born 1945)

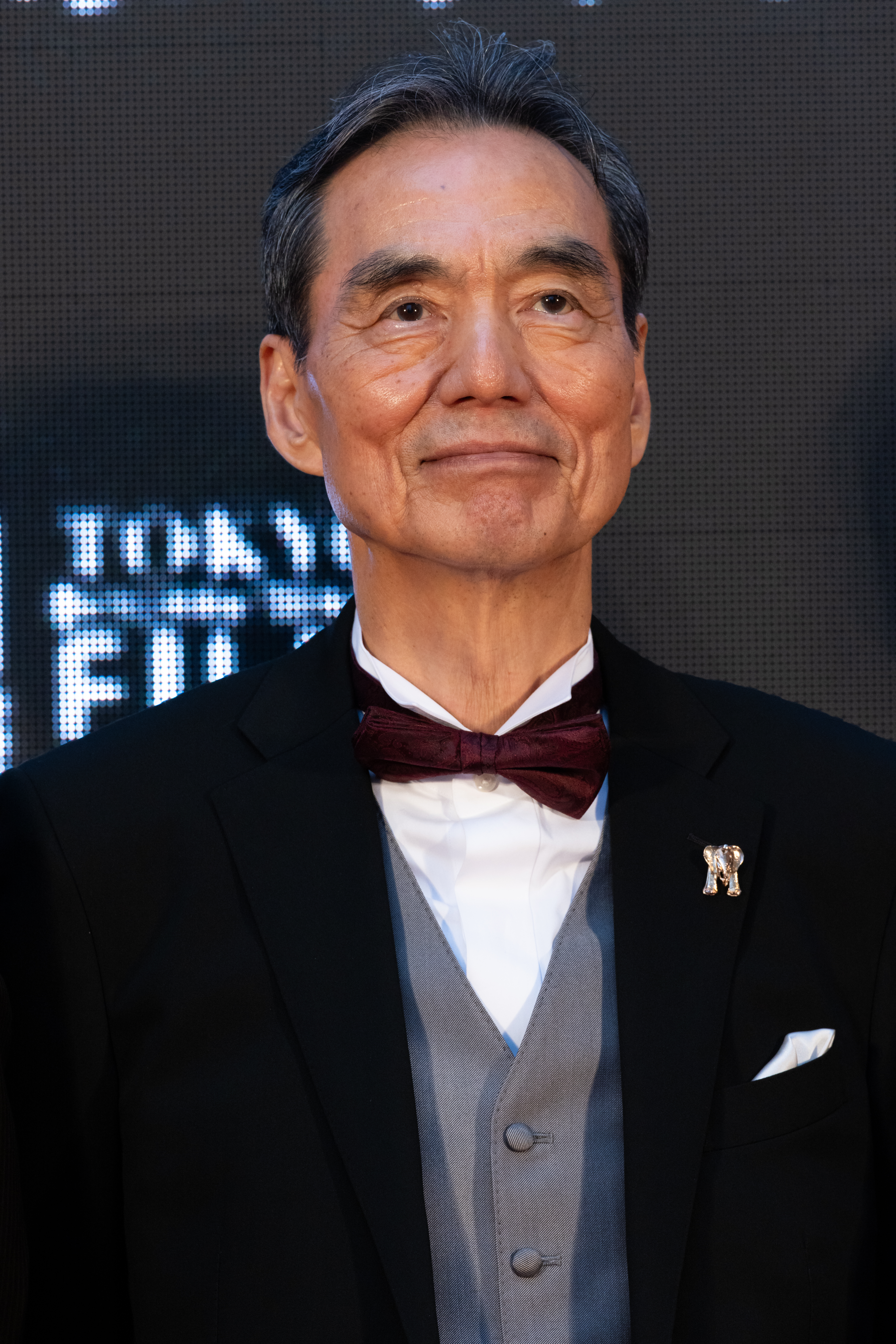
- Nagatsuka at the Tokyo International Film Festival in 2024
- Born: July 6, 1945 (age 81); Setagaya, Tokyo, Japan
- Occupation: Actor
- Years active: 1974–present
- Children: Keishi Nagatsuka

Kyōzō Nagatsuka (長塚京三) is a Japanese actor.

== Career ==
Nagatsuka made his film debut in Chinese in Paris while studying abroad at Sorbonne University. He won the award for best actor at the 24th Yokohama Film Festival for The Laughing Frog.

== Filmography ==
=== Film ===
Date	Title	Role	Notes	Ref(s)
1974	Chinese in Paris	General Pou-Yen	French-Italian film	
1977	The Far Road			
1990	Universal Laws	Kazuya		
1992	The Games Teachers Play	Shuhei Mikami	Lead role	
1992	Okoge	Tōichi		
1996	Village of Dreams	Kenzo Tashima		
1997	Moonlight Serenade	Kōkichi / Elder Keita	Lead role	
1997	Tokyo Lullaby	Kōichi Hamanaka	Lead role	
2002	The Laughing Frog	Ippei Kurasawa	Lead role	
2004	Lady Joker			
2012	Dearest			
2014	Our Family			
2018	Midnight Buss			
2022	Umami	Tetsuichi Morita	French-Japanese film	
2024	The Ohara Family Rhapsody	Sin'ichi Ōhara		
2025	Teki Cometh	Gisuke Watanabe	Lead role	
2025	Mt. Fuji and Happiness Code	Takeshi Ando		
2026	All of a Sudden	Goro Kiyomiya		

=== Television ===
Date	Title	Role	Notes	Ref(s)
1977	Kashin	Hijikata Toshizō	Taiga drama	
1979	Kusa Moeru	Yamaki Kanetaka	Taiga drama	
1981	Onna Taikōki	Oda Nobukatsu	Taiga drama	
1987	Dokuganryū Masamune	Rusu Masakage	Taiga drama	
1993–1994	Homura Tatsu	Minamoto no Yoritomo	Taiga drama	
1996–2000	I Am a Nurse	Dr. Shunsuke Sawada	3 seasons	
2008	Atsuhime	Shimazu Tadatake	Taiga drama	
2015	Burning Flower	Sugi Yurinosuke	Taiga drama	
2016	The Unbrokwn	Masayuki Kunimi		
2017	Crisis	Daiki Kaji		
2017	Kagerō no Tsuji Inemuri Iwane Edo Zōshi: The Final	Tanuma Okitsugu		
2017	Kurara: The Dazzling Life of Hokusai's Daughter	Hokusai	TV movie	
2019	Yuganda Hamon	Masakazu Aiga		
2027	The Shogunate Rebel	Takatsukasa Masamichi	Taiga drama	

== Awards and nominations ==
Year	Award	Category	Work(s)	Result	Ref.
1993	47th Mainichi Film Awards	Best Actor	The Games Teachers Play and Hikinige Family	Won	
1998	21st Japan Academy Film Prize	Best Actor	Moonlight Serenade	Nominated	
2003	24th Yokohama Film Festival	Best Actor	The Laughing Frog	Won	
2024	37th Tokyo International Film Festival	Best Actor	Teki Cometh	Won	
2025	18th Asian Film Awards	Best Actor	Teki Cometh	Nominated	
2026	80th Mainichi Film Awards	Best Lead Performance	Teki Cometh	Nominated	
2026	49th Japan Academy Film Prize	Best Actor	Teki Cometh	Nominated	
2026	39th Nikkan Sports Film Awards	Best Supporting Actor	All of a Sudden	Pending	
