= School Spirits =

School Spirit(s) may refer to:

- School spirit, school ethos/identity in education
- School Spirit, a 1985 comedy film
- "School Spirit" (Into the Dark), episode of Hulu's horror anthology streaming television series Into the Dark
- School Spirits (2012 TV series), a 2012 American paranormal documentary television series which aired on the Syfy channel
- School Spirits (2023 TV series), a 2023 American supernatural drama series released on Paramount+
- School Spirits, a 2020 adventure film starring Tiffany Alvord

== See also ==
- School Ghost Stories (disambiguation)
