= School Ghost Stories =

1995 Japanese film

- Theatrical release poster

Japanese name
- Kanji: 学校の怪談
Transcriptions
- Revised Hepburn: Gakkō no Kaidan
- Directed by: Hideyuki Hirayama
- Screenplay by: Satoko Okudera
- Story by: Toru Tsunemitsu
- Produced by: Yoshio Sakai; Yoshinori Fujita; Kazuhiko Seta; Noriyo Kimura
- Starring: Hironobu Nomura; Masumi Touyama; Shiori Yonezawa; Hajime Atsuta; Junichiro Tsukada
- Cinematography: Kōzō Shibasaki
- Edited by: Akimasa Kawashima
- Music by: Fuji-Yama; Akihiko Suwa; Shigeyuki Yamazaki
- Production companies: Toho; Sun Dance Company
- Distributed by: Toho
- Release date: July 8, 1995 (Japan)
- Running time: 100 minutes
- Country: Japan
- Box office: ¥2.55 billion (Japan)

School Ghost Stories (Japanese: 学校の怪談, Hepburn: Gakkō no Kaidan), also known as Haunted School, is a 1995 Japanese horror film directed by Hideyuki Hirayama. It follows a group of schoolchildren who encounter spirits and other supernatural happenings in an abandoned wing of their elementary school.

The film is the first installment in the School Ghost Stories film series, and was followed by School Ghost Stories 2 in 1996.

== Plot ==
At Ichogaoka Elementary School, on the day before summer vacation, a group of children accidentally break a small statue. When the school day ends, Mika Shinoda, a second-grader, encounters a bouncing football while retrieving her paint set. She follows the ball into an abandoned wing of the school, where, in the upstairs bathrooms, she is lifted into the air by an unseen force. Elsewhere, Mika's mother asks Mika's older sister, Aki, to bring her home.

Fifth-graders Kensuke Nakamura and Shota Segawa sneak into the abandoned wing of the school. Aki arrives, looking for Mika. She asks fourth-grader Hitoshi Chiba, who is drawing a magic circle on the ground in chalk, if he has seen Mika. She notices that the door to the abandoned wing is unlocked, and walks inside, where she meets up with Kensuke and Shota. Hitoshi soon follows and finds that the doors have locked behind him. Hitoshi's brother Kazuo, who has been absent from school for almost the entire term due to his belief that evil spirits haunt the premises, senses that Hitoshi is in danger.

In the abandoned wing, the children meet Kaori Komuro, a sixth-grader. The group witness a grinning spirit floating behind Shota, and flee in terror. Kazuo arrives at the abandoned wing with a schoolteacher named Shinichi Komukai, but the two are unable to see the children pounding on the windows of the now-locked building. Night falls, and Aki and Kaori are chased by a sandaled giant through the hallways of the wing. Aki hides in a closet and falls into a dark pit. Meanwhile, Shota, Kensuke and Hitoshi are attacked by an anatomical model, and meet a custodian named Kumahige.

Aki crosses paths with Shinichi and Kazuo, as well as Yumiko, Kensuke's mother and a former classmate of Shinichi. The four go to the abandoned wing, which unlocks itself. After Shinichi and Aki enter, the doors shut behind them, leaving Kazuo and Yumiko outside. Aki, Shota, Kensuke and Hitoshi see the grinning spirit behind Shinichi, and run. Hitoshi hides in a classroom containing clay models which transform into hands that envelop him. In a music classroom, Shota and Kaori witness an ensemble of ghostly string musicians. Outside, Kazuo sees Hitoshi in the rearview mirror of Yumiko's motorbike. Hitoshi tells Kazuo that a sacred object on school grounds, which kept evil spirits at bay, has been broken, but neither know what the object is.

Shinichi and the children encounter Kumahige, who sprouts arachnid-like appendages and chases them into an upside-down classroom. Desks fall from the ceiling, but Aki protects herself, Shinichi and Kaori using a diagram of a magic circle torn from a book. The paper transforms into a glowing butterfly, which leads them to the location of Hitoshi and Mika. Elsewhere in the wing, Shota and Kensuke encounter Kuchisake-onna, while outside, Kazuo begins drawing a large magic circle using a line marker, and Yumiko assembles a group of bikers to search the grounds for the sacred object.

After securing Mika, Shinichi and the children again face Kumahige. Hitoshi blinds Kumahige, who transforms into a large monster that lunges at Shota and Kensuke in a dumbwaiter. Shinichi and the children flee from the monster and find themselves at a door which leads to the dark pit that Aki fell down earlier. Shinichi jumps into the abyss with Mika in his arms, followed by Aki, Kensuke and Hitoshi. Shota discovers Kaori to be incorporeal, and falls into the pit without her. Outside, the bikers find the broken statue, which Kazuo places in the middle of the magic circle. It magically repairs itself, and both the statue and the circle begin glowing. A ball of light races through the abandoned wing of the school.

Shinichi, Mika, Aki, Shota, Kensuke and Hitoshi find themselves in the school swimming pool. They meet up with Kazuo and Yumiko. Yumiko tells them that, according to Kaori's father, Kaori was in the hospital and died some time prior to them meeting her. Some time later, Shota tells Kensuke that he wishes he had told Kaori he loved her. Shota, Kensuke, Kazuo, Hitoshi, Mika and Aki decide to go to Aki's house.

== Cast ==
- Hironobu Nomura as Shinichi Komukai, a teacher at Ichogaoka Elementary School.
- Masumi Touyama as Aki Shinoda, a fifth-grader and Mika's older sister.
- Shiori Yonezawa as Mika Shinoda, a second-grader and Aki's younger sister.
- Hajime Atsuta as Kensuke Nakamura, a fifth-grader.
- Junichiro Tsukada as Shota Segawa, a fifth-grader.
- Kohei Machida as Hitoshi Chiba, a fourth-grader. Due to an incident in which his brother Kazuo vomited in class, the two siblings were given the nickname "the throw-up twins".
- Shohei Machida as Kazuo Chiba, a fourth-grader.
- Ayako Sugiyama as Yumiko Nakamura, Kensuke's mother, and a former classmate of Shinichi.
- Aya Okamoto as Kaori Komuro, a sixth-grader whom the other children meet in the abandoned wing of the school.
- Masahiro Satō as Kumahige-san, the janitor.
  - Mizuho Yoshida as Kumahige's monstrous form.
- Kaoru Mizuki as Aki and Mika's mother.

== Background ==
In the mid-1980s, a schoolteacher named Toru Tsunemitsu began to share ghost stories with his young students. Tsunemitsu originally began his focus on ghost stories around town, but found an unusually large amount of them centered on school. He began to narrow his focus to school-based ghost stories, and asked his students for them, which led to his receiving over 160 stories in two weeks.

In 1990, the first volume of these stories by Tsunemitsu was released under the title Gakkō no Kaidan. The stories were aimed at children and published by Kodansha and became very popular in Japan. The stories were later adapted into television where they were bought by Kansai Television who televised a six-episode miniseries in 1994. In 1995, the School Ghost Stories film was made.

== Release ==
School Ghost Stories was released in Japan on July 8, 1995, where it was distributed by Toho. It earned a distribution income of ¥1.5 billion ($14.5 million) in Japan, and reached a total box office gross of ¥2.55 billion ($27.1 million) in Japan.

== Reception ==
David Kalat, author of J-Horror: The Definitive Guide to The Ring, The Grudge and Beyond (2007), described the series as being "packed with two scoops of wild, surrealistic visions, but no real sense of menace. A threadbare and uninteresting plot holds together 100-some minutes' worth of weird but mostly non-threatening spooks."

== Legacy ==
The film is the first of the School Ghost Stories features, and was followed by School Ghost Stories 2 in 1996. A third film, School Ghost Stories 3, was released in 1997, followed by a fourth, School Ghost Stories 4, in 1999.

A video game adaptation was released for the Sega Saturn on July 14, 1995.

== See also ==
- Japanese horror (or J-Horror) – horror fiction originating from Japan
- Ghost Stories – an anime adaptation that aired from 2000 to 2001
- Kotodama – Spiritual Curse – a 2014 Japanese horror film

== Notes ==
=== References ===
- Galbraith IV, Stuart (2008). The Toho Studios Story: A History and Complete Filmography. Scarecrow Press. ISBN 978-1461673743.
- Kalat, David (2007). J-Horror: The Definitive Guide to The Ring, The Grudge and Beyond. Vertical Inc. ISBN 978-1-932234-08-4.
