= Hironobu Nomura =

Japanese actor (born 1965)

- Born: 3 May 1965 (age 61); Tokyo, Japan
- Occupation: Actor
- Years active: 1984–present

Hironobu Nomura (野村宏伸, Nomura Hironobu; born 3 May 1965) is a Japanese actor. He has appeared in more than 40 films since 1984.

== Selected filmography ==
=== Film ===
Year	Title	Role	Notes	Ref.
1995	School Ghost Stories		Lead role	
1996	School Ghost Stories 2		Lead role	
1997	Toki o Kakeru Shōjo			
2004	Flower and Snake			
2006	Retribution			
2006	The Go Master	Yasunari Kawabata		
2020	Mio's Cookbook			
2021	The Woman of S.R.I. the Movie			
2025	Utakata			
2026	The Curse		Taiwanese-Japanese film	

=== TV ===
Year	Title	Role	Notes	Ref.
1987	Dokuganryū Masamune	Date Tadamune	Taiga drama	
1991	Minamoto no Yoshitsune	Minamoto no Yoshitsune	Lead role; TV movie	
1993–94	Homura Tatsu	Minamoto no Yoshitsune	Taiga drama	
1996	Toritsu Mizusho!			
2013	Ultraman Ginga	Seiichirō Isurugi		
2016–17	Kamen Rider Ex-Aid	Kyotaro Hinata		

== Awards ==
Year	Award	Category	Work(s)	Result	Ref.
1991	15th Elan d'or Awards	Newcomer of the Year	Himself	Won	
