= The Games Teachers Play =

- DVD cover

Japanese name
- Kanji: ザ・中学教師
Transcriptions
- Revised Hepburn: Za Chūgaku Kyōshi
- Directed by: Hideyuki Hirayama
- Written by: Hiroshi Saitō
- Produced by: Kota Yamada
- Starring: Kyōzō Nagatsuka; Tomoko Fujita; Kazuhiko Kanayama
- Cinematography: Kōzō Shibasaki
- Edited by: Shigeru Okuhara
- Music by: Kow Otani
- Production companies: Méliès; Suntory
- Distributed by: Argo Pictures
- Release date: April 25, 1992 (Japan)
- Running time: 106 minutes
- Country: Japan
- Language: Japanese

The Games Teachers Play (Japanese: ザ・中学教師, Hepburn: Za Chūgaku Kyōshi), also known as The Professional, is a 1992 Japanese film directed by Hideyuki Hirayama.

== Cast ==
- Kyōzō Nagatsuka as Shuhei Mikami
- Tomoko Fujita as Junko Osanai
- Kazuhiko Kanayama as Yonekura
- Kei Tani as Ikuo Haruyama
- Jun Fubuki as Tsuneko Adachi
- Kirin Kiki as Yasuko Takeda
