= Hideyuki Hirayama =

Japanese film director (born 1950)

- Born: September 18, 1950 (age 75); Kitakyushu, Japan
- Occupation: Film director

Hideyuki Hirayama (平山秀幸, Hirayama Hideyuki; born September 18, 1950 in Kitakyushu) is a Japanese film director. His theatrical debut was the film Maria's Stomach in 1990. He won the Directors Guild of Japan New Directors Award for The Games Teachers Play in 1992. In 1995, School Ghost Stories was a big hit and made into popular series. Begging for Love in 1998 got many awards as International press award (FIPRESCI) in Montreal World Film Festival, Japan Academy Prize for Director of the Year, Mainichi Film Award for Best Director etc. In 2001, Hirayama won Best Director Choice for Turn at the Puchon International Fantastic Film Festival. He also got several Japanese film awards for director, including the Best Director award for The Laughing Frog and Out at the 2003 Yokohama Film Festival.

== Filmography ==
=== Film ===
- Maria's Stomach (1990)
- The Games Teachers Play (1992)
- Human Scramble -RAIN- (1993)
- Playing with Good Children (1994)
- School Ghost Stories (1995)
- School Ghost Stories 2 (1996)
- Begging for Love (1998)
- Haunted School 4 (1999)
- Turn (2001)
- The Laughing Frog (2002)
- Out (2002)
- Samurai Resurrection (2003)
- Lady Joker (2004)
- Talk, Talk, Talk (2007)
- Three for the Road (2007)
- Forget Me Not (2010)
- Sword of Desperation (2010)
- Oba: The Last Samurai (2011)
- Everest: The Summit of the Gods (2016)
- Family of Strangers (2019)
- Tsuyukusa (2022)

=== Television ===
- 1972: Nagisa no Keika (2025)
