= Gakkō no Kaidan 2 =

Haunted School 2
- Film poster
- Directed by: Hideyuki Hirayama
- Screenplay by: Satoko Okudera
- Story by: Tōru Tsunemitsu
- Based on: Gakkō no Kaidan by Tōru Tsunemitsu
- Produced by: Sadatoshi Fujimine; Yoshinori Fujita; Noriyo Kimura; Kazuhiko Seta; Hideyuki Takai
- Starring: Hironobu Nomura; Naomi Nishida; Kyōko Kishida; Masakane Yonekura
- Cinematography: Kōzō Shibasaki
- Edited by: Akimasa Kawashima
- Music by: Tamiya Terashima
- Distributed by: Toho
- Release date: July 20, 1996 (Japan)
- Running time: 103 minutes
- Country: Japan
- Language: Japanese

Haunted School 2 (Japanese: 学校の怪談2, Hepburn: Gakkō no Kaidan 2), also known as School Ghost Stories 2, is a 1996 Japanese horror film directed by Hideyuki Hirayama. It is the second installment in the Gakkō no Kaidan film series, following the 1995 film School Ghost Stories.

== Cast ==
- Hironobu Nomura as Kazunari Asano
- Naomi Nishida as Rika Odagiri
- Kyōko Kishida as Shizuko Tokiwa
- Masakane Yonekura as Jushoku

== Reception ==
The film was chosen as one of the Top 10 Japanese films at the 39th Blue Ribbon Awards and Kyōko Kishida won the Award for Best Supporting Actress.
