= Naomi Nishida =

Japanese actress

- Born: Fukuyama, Hiroshima, Japan
- Status: Married
- Occupation: Actress
- Years active: 1991–present
- Children: 1

Naomi Nishida (西田 尚美, Nishida Naomi) is a Japanese actress. She won the Best Supporting Actress award at the 2001 Yokohama Film Festival and at the 25th Hochi Film Award for her performance in Nabbie's Love.

== Personal life ==
She married a Japanese shoe designer in 2005, and gave birth to a girl on April 7, 2008.

== Filmography ==
=== Film ===
- My Secret Cache (1997)
- Begging for Love (1998)
- Library Wars (2013), Maki Origuchi
- My Pretend Girlfriend (2014), Noboru's mother
- In Those Days (2021), Baba
- Around the Table (2021), Haruko Aoba
- In the Wake (2021)
- Skeleton Flowers (2021)
- The Zen Diary (2022), Mika
- Sadako DX (2022), Chieko Ichijō
- Re/Member (2022)
- The Village (2023), Kimie Katayama
- Secret: A Hidden Score (2024), Naitō
- Aimitagai (2024), Tomoko
- Arrogance and Virtue (2024), Yoshino
- 11 Rebels (2024)
- Faceless (2024)
- Under the Big Onion (2025), Takeru's mother
- Dollhouse (2025)
- Unreachable (2025)
- Beethoven Fabrication (2025), Helene von Breuning
- One Year to Live, Buy a Man (2026), Mizuho Maruyama

=== Television ===
- The Great White Tower (2003)
- Furinkazan (2007), Aya-Gozen
- Naoki Hanzawa season 2 (2020), Sachiyo Tanigawa
- Come Come Everybody (2021), Koshizu Tachibana
- Teen Regime (2022), Tae Sagawa
