= School Ghost Stories 3 =

1997 film by Shūsuke Kaneko

- Japanese film poster
- Directed by: Shūsuke Kaneko
- Screenplay by: Shūsuke Kaneko; Mitsuru Shimada
- Produced by: Yoshinori Fujita; Kazuhiko Seda; Norio Kimura
- Starring: Naomi Nishida; Hitomi Kuroki; Hideki Noda
- Cinematography: Kōzō Shibasaki
- Edited by: Akimasa Kawashima
- Music by: Kow Otani
- Production company: Toho Co., Ltd.: Sundance Company
- Distributed by: Toho Co., Ltd.
- Release date: July 19, 1997 (Japan)
- Running time: 96 minutes
- Country: Japan
- Language: Japanese
- Box office: ¥1.150 billion

School Ghost Stories 3 (Japanese: 学校の怪談３, Hepburn: Gakkō no Kaidan 3), also known as Haunted School 3, is a 1997 Japanese film directed by Shūsuke Kaneko. The film is about elementary school children who are taken to an alternate universe through a school mirror.

The film was one of the higher grossing Japanese films in 1997, grossing as much as Rebirth of Mothra and Neon Genesis Evangelion: Death & Rebirth. The film won Naomi Nishida the award for Best Newcomer at the 21st Japan Academy Prize.

== Cast ==
- Naomi Nishida as Kaoru Yahashi
- Hitomi Kuroki as Machiko Kubota
- Hideki Noda as a school teacher
- Takuma Yoshizawa as Ryo Kubota
- Aki Maeda as Mayuko Fujii
- Takeru Higa as Taichi
- Kazuki Yamada as Makoto Ota
- Hironobu Nomura as Teacher Tameyama
- Masahiko Tsugawa as the school master
- Machiko Watanabe as Makoto's mother
- Kei Satō as Takuya

== Release ==
School Ghost Stories 3 was released in Japan on July 19, 1997 where it was distributed by Toho. The film grossed a total of 1.150 billion yen on its theatrical release in Japan.

== Reception ==
Naomi Nishida won the Award for Best Newcomer at the 21st Japan Academy Prize.
