= Gakkō no Kaidan 4 =

Haunted School 4
- DVD cover

Japanese name
- Kanji: 学校の怪談4
Transcriptions
- Revised Hepburn: Gakkō no Kaidan 4
- Directed by: Hideyuki Hirayama
- Written by: Satoko Okudera
- Produced by: Yoshinori Fujita; Noriyo Kimura; Kazuhiko Seta
- Starring: Mai Toyoda; Toshiteru Hirose; Matsunosuke Shofukutei
- Cinematography: Kōzō Shibasaki
- Edited by: Akira Kawashima
- Music by: Ryudo Uzaki
- Release date: July 10, 1999 (Japan)
- Running time: 99 minutes
- Country: Japan
- Language: Japanese

Haunted School 4 (Japanese: 学校の怪談4, Hepburn: Gakkō no Kaidan 4), also known as School Ghost Stories 4, is a 1999 Japanese film directed by Hideyuki Hirayama.

== Cast ==
- Mai Toyoda as Yae Anzai
- Toshiteru Hirose as Kou Anzai
- Matsunosuke Shofukutei as Koichi Sekigawa
- Mieko Harada as Harumi Kunimi
- Yu Tokui as Firefighter
