= List of Japanese films of 1999 =

== Highest-grossing films ==
Rank	Title	Gross
1	Pokémon: The Movie 2000	¥3.50 billion
2	Ring 2	¥2.10 billion
3	Poppoya	¥2.05 billion
4	Doraemon: Nobita Drifts in the Universe	¥2.00 billion
5	Case Closed: The Last Wizard of the Century	¥1.45 billion

== List of films ==
A list of films released in Japan in 1999 (see 1999 in film).

Title	Director	Cast	Genre	Notes
Adolescence of Utena	Kunihiko Ikuhara		—	
Adrenaline Drive	Shinobu Yaguchi	Masanobu Andō, Hikari Ishida, Yutaka Matsushige	Comedy	
After the Rain	Takashi Koizumi	Akira Terao, Yoshiko Miyazaki, Shiro Mifune	Drama	Japanese-French co-production
Audition	Takashi Miike	Ryo Ishibashi, Eihi Shiina, Miyuki Matsuda	Horror	
Away With Words	Christopher Doyle	Tadanobu Asano, Kevin Sherlock, Mavis Xu	Drama	
Barren Illusion	Kiyoshi Kurosawa	Shinji Takeda, Miako Tadano, Yutaka Yasui	Science fiction	
Cardcaptor Sakura: The Movie	Morio Asaka		Animation	
Case Closed: The Last Wizard of the Century	Kenji Kodama			Animated feature
Charisma	Kiyoshi Kurosawa	Köji Yakusho, Hiroyuki Ikeuchi, Ren Osugi	Drama	
Dead or Alive	Takashi Miike	Riki Takeuchi	Action	
Don't Look Back	Akihiko Shiota	Yusaku Suzuki, Shingo Mizuno, Yuria Haga	Drama	
Eiga kureyon Shin-chan–Bakuhatsu! Onsen Wakwaku daikessen	Keiichi Hara		—	Animated feature
EM Embalming	Shinji Aoyama	Reiko Takashima, Yukata Matsushige, Toshio Shiba	Horror	
The Haunted School 4	Hideyuki Hirayama	Mai Toyoda, Matsunosuke Shofukutei, Yuki Minakawa		
Gamera 3: The Revenge of Iris	Shusuke Kaneko	Shinobu Nakayama, Ai Maeda, Yukijiro Hotaru	Science fiction	
Gemini	Shinya Tsukamoto	Masahiro Motoki, Ryō, Yasutaka Tsutsu	Horror	
Gingaman vs. Megaranger				
Godzilla 2000: Millennium	Takao Okawara	Takehiro Murata, Shiro Sano, Hiroshi Abe	Science fiction	
Himitsu	Yōjirō Takita	Ryōko Hirosue, Kaoru Kobayashi, Kayoko Kishimoto	Fantasy, romance	
Japanese Hell	Teruo Ishii	Michiko Maeda, Nozomi Saito	Horror	
Jin Roh	Mamoru Oshii			
Kaizokuban Bootleg Film	Masahiro Kobayashi			
Keiho	Yoshimitsu Morita	Kyōka Suzuki, Shinichi Tsutsumi, Ittoku Kishibe	Mystery	
Kikujiro	Takeshi Kitano	Takeshi Kitano, Yusuke Sekiguchi, Kayoko Kishimoto	Comedy-drama	
Kureshin Paradaisu! Meido • In • Saitama	Tsutomu Mizushima		—	Animated feature
Ley Lines	Takashi Miike	Kazuki Kitamura, Sho Aihara, Naoto Takenaka	Action, crime	
M/Other	Nobuhiro Suwa	Tomokazu Miura, Makiko Watanabe, Ryudai Tatkahashi	Drama	
Messengers	Yasuo Baba	Naoko Iijima, Tsuyoshi Kusanagi	Comedy	
Moonlight Whispers	Akihiko Shiota	Kenji Mizuhashi, Tsugumi, Kouta Kusano	Drama, romance	
My Neighbors the Yamadas	Isao Takahata		Comedy	
Nobita Drifts in the Universe	Tsutomu Shibayama			Animated feature
Nobita no kekkon Zenya	Ayumu Watanabe			Animated short
Nodo-Jiman	Kazuyuki Izutus	Shigeru Muroi, Kohei Otomo, Isao Bido	Comedy	
Office Lady Love Juice	Yūji Tajiri	Azumi Kubota, Mikio Satō	Pink	
Osaka Story	Jun Ichikawa	Chizuru Ikewaki, Kōsuke Minamino, Kenji Sawada	Drama	
Owls' Castle	Masahiro Shinoda	Shohei Hino, Shima Iwashita, Takaya Kamikawa		
The Perfect Education	Ben Wada	Naoto Takenaka, Hijiri Kojima, Eriko Watanabe	Drama	
Pokémon: The Movie 2000	Kunihiko Yuyama			
Pola X	Leos Carax	Guillaume Depardieu, Yekaterina Golubeva, Catherine Deneuve	Drama	French-German-Japanese-Swiss co-production
Poppoya	Yasuo Furuhata	Ken Takakura, Nenji Kobayashi, Shinobu Otake	Drama	
Rainbow Over the Cape	Masahiko Okumura	Rentarō Mikuni, Mieko Harada, Isao Natsuyagi	—	
Ring 2	Hideo Nakata	Miki Nakatani, Hitomi Satō, Kyoko Fukada	Horror	
Saimin	Masayuki Ochiai	Miho Kann, Ken Utsui, Yukio Watanabe	Horror	
Shabondama Elegy	Ian Kerkof	Thom Hoffman, Mai Hoshino, Kiyomi Ito	Crime, romance	Japanese-Dutch co-production
Shady Grove	Shinji Aoyama	Arata, Wakaba Nakano	Romantic drama	
Shikoku	Shunichi Nagasaki	Chiaki Kuriyama, Yui Natsukawa, Michitaka Tsutsui	Thriller	
Silver	Takashi Miike	Atsuko Sakuraba, Kenji Haga, Keiji Matsuda	—	
Taboo	Nagisa Oshima	Takeshi Kitano, Shinji Takeda, Tadanobu Asano	Drama	
Tomie: Another Face	Toshiro Inomata	Akira Shirai, Runa Nagai	Horror	
Ultraman Tiga & Ultraman Dyna & Ultraman Gaia: Battle in Hyperspace	Kazuya Konaka	Takeshi Yoshioka		
White-Collar Worker Kintaro	Takashi Miike	Katsunori Takahashi, Michiko Hada, Tsutomu Yamazaki	—	
Wild Zero	Tetsuro Takeuchi	Guitar Wolf, Makoto Inamiya, Masashi Endo		
Will to Live	Kaneto Shindo	Rentarō Mikuni, Shinobu Otake		
Yu-Gi-Oh!	Junji Shimizu			
Za • Doraemonzu–Okashina Okashina Okashinana	Yoshitomo Yonetani			Animated short

== See also ==
- 1999 in Japan
- 1999 in Japanese television

== Notes ==
=== References ===
- Mes, Tom (2006). Agitator: The Cinema of Takashi Miike. FAB Press. ISBN 978-1903254417.
- Galbraith IV, Stuart (2008). The Toho Studios Story: A History and Complete Filmography. Scarecrow Press. ISBN 978-1461673743.
- Desjardins, Chris (2008). Outlaw Masters of Japanese Film. I.B.Tauris. ISBN 978-1845110901.
- Berra, John (2012). Directory of World Cinema: Japan 2. Intellect Books. ISBN 978-1841505510.
- Harper, Jim (2012). Flowers from Hell. Noir Publishing. ISBN 978-0953656479.
