= 9th Japan Film Professional Awards =

Japanese film awards in 2000

- Date: April 8, 2000
- Site: Theatre Shinjuku, Tokyo, Japan

The 9th Japan Film Professional Awards (第9回日本映画プロフェッショナル大賞) is the 9th edition of the Japan Film Professional Awards. It awarded the best of 1999 in film. The ceremony took place on April 8, 2000 at Theatre Shinjuku in Tokyo.

== Awards ==
- Best Film: Don't Look Back
- Best Director: Yuji Nakae (Nabbie's Love)
- Best Actress: Takami Yoshimoto (Minazuki)
- Best Actor: Hidetoshi Nishijima (License to Live)
- Best New Encouragement: Tsugumi (Moonlight Whispers)
- Best New Director: Akihiko Shiota (Don't Look Back, Moonlight Whispers)
- Special: Riki Takeuchi (Dead or Alive, Blood Rōketsu, Hōfuku Revenge Gekijōban)
- Special: Shirō Sasaki (For production of Nabbie's Love.)

== 10 best films ==
1. Don't Look Back (Akihiko Shiota)
2. Nabbie's Love (Yuji Nakae)
3. Dead or Alive (Takashi Miike)
4. License to Live (Kiyoshi Kurosawa)
5. Moonlight Whispers (Akihiko Shiota)
6. Ley Lines (Takashi Miike)
7. Office Lady Love Juice (Yūji Tajiri)
8. M/Other (Nobuhiro Suwa)
9. Shark Skin Man and Peach Hip Girl (Katsuhito Ishii)
10. Adrenaline Drive (Shinobu Yaguchi)
