= 21st Yokohama Film Festival =

2000 film festival in Yokohama, Japan

- Location: Kannai Hall, Yokohama, Kanagawa, Japan
- Founded: 1980
- Festival date: 6 February 2000

The 21st Yokohama Film Festival (第21回ヨコハマ映画祭) was held on 6 February 2000 in Kannai Hall, Yokohama, Kanagawa, Japan.

== Awards ==
- Best Film: 39 keihō dai sanjūkyū jō
- Best Actor: Ken Takakura – Poppoya
- Best Actress: Shinobu Otake – Kuroi Ie
- Best Supporting Actor: Kazuki Kitamura – Kyohansha, Minazuki, The Perfect Education
- Best Director: Yoshimitsu Morita – 39 keihō dai sanjūkyū jō
- Best New Director:
  - Kentarō Ōtani – Avec mon mari
  - Akihiko Shiota – Moonlight Whispers, Don't Look Back
- Best Screenplay: Sumio Omori – 39 keihō dai sanjūkyū jō
- Best Cinematography: Nobuyasu Kita – Kuroi Ie
- Best New Talent:
  - Yuka Itaya – Avec mon mari
  - Tsugumi – Moonlight Whispers
  - Takami Yoshimoto – Minazuki
  - Chizuru Ikewaki – Osaka Story
- Special Prize: Sumiko Fuji – The Geisha House (Career)

== Best 10 ==
1. 39 keihō dai sanjūkyū jō
2. Jubaku: Spellbound
3. Nodo Jiman
4. Moonlight Whispers
5. Kikujiro
6. Osaka Story
7. Kuroi Ie
8. Wait and See
9. Avec mon mari
10. Adrenaline Drive

runner-up: Himitsu
