= List of Japanese films of 1993 =

The following is a list of films released in Japan in 1993 (see 1993 in film).

Title	Director	Cast	Genre	Notes
Bloom in the Moonlight	Shinichiro Sawai	Isako Washio; Tōru Kazama; Fumi Dan		
A Class to Remember	Yoji Yamada	Toshiyuki Nishida	Drama	Japan Academy Prize for Best Film
Coo: Tōi Umi kara Kita Coo			Anime	Based on a Naoki Prize-winning novel
Crayon Shin-chan: Action Kamen vs Haigure Devil			Anime	First Crayon Shin-chan movie
Dairanger Movie			Tokusatsu	
Dragon Ball Z: Broly the Legendary Super Saiyan	Shigeyasu Yamauchi		Anime	
Dragon Ball Z: Bojack Unbound	Yoshihiro Ueda		Anime	
Gakko				
Godzilla vs. Mechagodzilla II	Takao Okawara		Kaiju	
Kamen Rider ZO	Keita Amemiya		Tokusatsu	
Madadayo	Akira Kurosawa			Akira Kurosawa's last film.
Mermaid's Scar	Morio Asaka		Anime drama mystery fantasy	OVA
Moving	Shinji Sōmai			Screened at the 1993 Cannes Film Festival
Ninja Scroll	Yoshiaki Kawajiri	Kōichi Yamadera, Emi Shinohara	Anime	
Sonatine	Takeshi Kitano	Beat Takeshi	Yakuza film	
Tora-san's Matchmaker	Yoji Yamada	Kiyoshi Atsumi	Comedy	46th in the Otoko wa Tsurai yo series
Yearning	Bandō Tamasaburō V			Entered into the 43rd Berlin International Film Festival
YuYu Hakusho: The Golden Seal	Noriyuki Abe		Anime	The first film in the Yu Yu Hakusho franchise.

== See also ==
- 1993 in Japan
- 1993 in Japanese television
