= W no higeki =

W no higeki (Wの悲劇, Tragedy of W) may refer to:

- Murder at Mt. Fuji, the English translation of a 1982 novel by Shizuko Natsuki
- W's Tragedy, a 1984 film starring Hiroko Yakushimaru based on the 1982 novel
