= Susumu Taira =

Japanese actor (1934–2024)

- 平良進
- Born: 18 December 1934; Hirara, Okinawa, Japan
- Died: 27 January 2024 (aged 89); Ginowan, Okinawa, Japan
- Occupation: Actor
- Spouse: Tomi Taira

Susumu Taira (平良進, Taira Susumu; 18 December 1934 – 27 January 2024) was a Japanese actor. He was born in Okinawa, and his credits include Nabbie's Love (1999), and Churasan.

Taira was born in the former city of Hirara, Okinawa which was merged with other settlements in 2005 to become the city of Miyakojima, Okinawa. Taira was married to actress Tomi Taira. He died at his home in Ginowan, Okinawa, on 27 January 2024, at the age of 89.
