= Yuka Itaya =

Japanese actress and caster (born 1975)

- 板谷 由夏
- Born: 22 June 1975 (age 51); Fukuoka Prefecture, Japan
- Occupation: Actress
- Years active: 1994–present
- Agent: Amuse, Inc.
- Notable work: Dodge Go! Go!
- Television: Perfect Love!; Aishiteru: Kaiyō; Gine: Sanfujinka no Onna-tachi
- Spouse: Hirohiko Furuta (m. 2007)
- Children: 2
- Website: Official website

Yuka Itaya (板谷 由夏, Itaya Yuka; born June 22, 1975, in Fukuoka Prefecture) is a Japanese actress and caster. She is represented by Amuse, Inc.

== Biography ==
Itaya graduated from Kyushu International University Comes High School and Fukuoka Jo Gakuin Junior College.

She worked as an exclusive model for PeeWee in 1994. In 1995, Itaya joined with Hanamaru Hakata (as Hakata Tsuruya at the time) and Otako Pū as South End×Yuka (stylized as SOUTH END×YUKA) and released the single "So.ta.i". She made her acting debut in the film avec mon mari, co-starring with Kentarō Ōtani, in which she won the Best New Talent award at the Yokohama Film Festival. After appearing in Perfect Love!, Itaya appeared in many television dramas and films.

=== Personal life ===
On February 22, 2007, she married wardrobe stylist Hirohiko Furuta. Itaya gave birth to her eldest son in June 2008, and to her second son on August 9, 2012, and is now a mother of two children.

== Filmography ==
=== TV dramas ===
| Year | Title | Role | Notes | Ref. |
|---|---|---|---|---|
| 1999 | Perfect Love! | Aya Tominaga | | |
| 2008 | Atsuhime | Hirokawa | Taiga drama | |
| 2015 | Ishi-tachi no Renai Jijō | Tomoko Ichikawa | | |
| 2015 | Kāsan, Ore wa Daijōbu | Nurse Shintani | TV movie | |
| 2015 | Isan Sōzoku | Rinko Kawamura | | |
| 2016 | Yassan: Tsukiji-hatsu! Oishī Jiken-bo | Omoni | | |
| 2016 | Sniffer: Kyūkaku Sōsa-kan | Emi Katayama | | |
| 2017 | The Stranger Within a Woman | Michiko Ito | | |
| 2021 | Pension Metsa | Fuki | Episode 3 | |
| 2021 | Ochoyan | Yū | Asadora | |
| 2022 | Tokyo Vice | Mrs. Katagiri | | |
| 2024 | Dear Radiance | Takashina no Takako | Taiga drama | |

=== Variety, cultural programmes ===
| Year | Title | Notes | Ref. |
|---|---|---|---|
| 2007 | News Zero | Tuesday caster | |
| 2010 | History 10-Nen no Happyō: Anata ga Erabu 10 Genre No. 1 | Presenter | |
| 2011 | Takumi Saito×Yuka Itaya: Eiga Kōbō | | |
| 2016 | Nonfiction W: Hollywood o Sukutta Utagoe –Shijō Saikyō no Ghost Singer to Yoba reta Onna– | Narration | |
| 2022 | Love Is Blind: Japan | Co-host | |

=== Films ===
| Year | Title | Role | Notes | Ref. |
|---|---|---|---|---|
| 1999 | avec mon mari | Mitsuko Aso | | |
| 2001 | Hikari no Ame | Teruko Tsukida | | |
| 2002 | Dodge Go! Go! | Sachie Yamada | | |
| 2002 | Tokyo.sora | Yoko | | |
| 2002 | Tasogare Ryūsei-gun | Mina Imai | | |
| 2004 | Survive Style 5+ | President's Secretary | | |
| 2005 | A Stranger of Mine | Ayumi Kurata | | |
| 2005 | Irasshaimase, Kanja-sama. | Yen Shimizu | | |
| 2005 | Yokubō | Ruiko Aota | Lead role | |
| 2006 | Berna no shippo | Keiko Ito | | |
| 2006 | Akihabara@Deep | Yui | | |
| 2007 | Sad Vacation | Saeko Shiina | | |
| 2007 | Closed Note | Seibi Yamazaki | | |
| 2007 | Kayōkyokuda yo, Jinsei wa | Beautiful woman | | |
| 2007 | Apartment 1303 | Neighbor next door | | |
| 2010 | Ōoku | Ōoka Tadasuke | | |
| 2010 | Outrage | Otomo woman | | |
| 2012 | Girl | Takako Hirai | | |
| 2012 | Hotaru the Movie: It's Only A Little Light In My Life | Sachiko Yamada | | |
| 2014 | Our Family | | | |
| 2016 | You Lie in April | Hiroko Seto | | |
| 2017 | March Comes in like a Lion | Misaki | | |
| 2018 | Sunny: Our Hearts Beat Together | adult Ito Serika | | |
| 2019 | 37 Seconds | Fujimoto | | |
| 2019 | At the End of the Matinee | Keiko | | |
| 2021 | Unlock Your Heart | Yoriko Kimura | | |
| 2022 | A Hundred Flowers | | | |
| 2022 | No Place to Go | Michiko Kitabayashi | Lead role | |
| 2023 | Analog | Kazumi | | |
| 2023 | The Moon | | | |
| 2024 | Sensei's Pious Lie | | | |
| 2024 | Adabana | | French-Japanese film | |
| 2025 | Good Luck | | | |
| 2025 | Rental Family | | American-Japanese film | |
| 2026 | Euthanasia Special Zone | | | |
| 2026 | Zakken!: The Cosmos Beneath Our Feet | Rikako Sugino | | |
| 2026 | Love≠Comedy | | | |
| 2026 | After the Song | Hanae Nagasawa | | |

=== Japanese dub ===
| Year | Title | Role | Voice dub for | Notes | Ref. |
|---|---|---|---|---|---|
| 2015 | Extant | Molly Woods | Halle Berry | | |

== Awards ==
| Year | Award | Work | Ref. |
|---|---|---|---|
| 1999 | 21st Yokohama Film Festival Best New Talent | avec mon mari | |
| 2005 | 60th Mainichi Film Award for Best Supporting Actress | A Stranger of Mine | |
