= Fist of the North Star (1995 film) =

1995 film by Tony Randel

- Directed by: Tony Randel
- Screenplay by: Peter Atkins; Tony Randel
- Based on: Fist of the North Star by: Buronson; Tetsuo Hara
- Produced by: Mark Yellen; Akihiro Komine
- Starring: Gary Daniels; Costas Mandylor; Chris Penn; Isako Washio; Melvin Van Peebles; Downtown Julie Brown; Leon "Vader" White; Malcolm McDowell
- Cinematography: Jacques Haitkin
- Edited by: Sonny Baskin
- Music by: Christopher L. Stone
- Production companies: First Look Pictures; Ozla Pictures; Zeta Entertainment; NEO Motion Pictures
- Distributed by: Overseas Filmgroup
- Release dates: April 21, 1995 (Japan); February 2, 1996 (US)
- Running time: 103 minutes
- Country: United States
- Language: English
- Budget: $5-7 million

Fist of the North Star is a 1995 American science fiction martial arts film based on the Japanese manga of the same name by Buronson and Tetsuo Hara. The film was directed by Tony Randel, who also co-wrote the script with Peter Atkins, and stars Gary Daniels, Costas Mandylor, Chris Penn, Isako Washio and Malcolm McDowell. A Japanese dub of the film was produced by Toei Video which featured the cast of the 1980s anime television series reprising their roles. The film was released direct-to-video.

The film, which loosely adapts the first story arc of the original manga, centers on Ken (Daniels), the lone master of the "North Star" martial art school, who wanders the post-apocalyptic Earth in search of his nemesis Lord Shin, the man who killed his master and kidnapped his fiancee. Meanwhile, Shin rules as dictator of the city of Southern Cross with his personal army known as the Crossmen, who are given orders to hunt down Kenshiro.

== Plot ==
In the aftermath of World War III, the world has plunged into anarchy and chaos. Water is scarce and what is left of the human race scrounges for survival. Two opposing martial arts schools, North Star and Southern Cross, both devoted to bringing order to the world, were previously thrown into disarray after Southern Cross adept Shin turned against his masters and summarily executed North Star master Ryuken, leaving his son Kenshiro as the sole heir to the North Star. Shin then sought Kenshiro himself, defeated him and left him for dead after carving his chest with seven scars in the shape of the Big Dipper. Shin also abducted Kenshiro's fiancee and their shared love interest Julia, segregating her in his tower. Since then, Shin rules the land with an iron fist through a militia called the Crossmen, led by Jackal, a ruthless henchman whose bulging head is held in leather bandages after Kenshiro disfigured him in an earlier fight.

Back in the current time, Kenshiro, who survived Shin's aggression, wanders the wasteland aimlessly. After killing a gang led by bandit Zeed, who attacked the homestead that had given him shelter for the night, Kenshiro continues on towards the town of Paradise Valley, home to one of the few remaining sources of pure water. There, he meets orphan siblings Bat and Lynn. After using a pressure point technique to restore Lynn's sight, which she lost after watching her parents murdered by Crossmen, Kenshiro departs, ignoring Lynn's plea to remain and protect them. Bat follows Kenshiro to talk him into joining the organized resistance against the Crossmen's incursions, to no avail.

The Crossmen raid Paradise Valley and occupy it, commandeering the well. Jackal orders Lynn's execution for sedition, but halts it after she threateningly mentions Kenshiro, taking her prisoner instead to extort Kenshiro's whereabouts. As Lynn's screams from afar ring inside Kenshiro's head, Kenshiro turns back: he and Bat infiltrate the occupied town and free Lynn, but Bat is mortally wounded in a fight against Jackal. Kenshiro spares Jackal and sends him back to Shin to announce his arrival.

By Shin's order, Jackal takes Julia to the tower's basement to hide her from Kenshiro. There, he engages in a cat-and-mouse game in an attempt to rape and kill Julia. Kenshiro breaks into Shin's tower and confronts him in the throne room. As Kenshiro gains the upper hand in the ensuing showdown, Shin lies about Julia's fate and takes advantage of Kenshiro's shock to overpower him. However, after noticing a bud that has sprouted from a seed he had given Julia long before, Kenshiro regains hope and defeats Shin, killing him. After freeing herself from Jackal by removing his bandages and causing his head to swell and explode, Julia rejoins Kenshiro. The surviving Crossmen bow to Kenshiro and Julia in deference.

== Cast ==
- Gary Daniels as Kenshiro
- Costas Mandylor as Lord Shin
- Chris Penn as "Jackal"
- Isako Washio as Julia
- Melvin Van Peebles as Asher
- Downtown Julie Brown as Charlotte "Charlie"
- Dante Basco as "Bat"
- Tracey Walter as Paul McCarthy
- Clint Howard as "Stalin"
- Big Van Vader as "Goliath"
- Paulo Tocha as "Stone"
- Malcolm McDowell as Ryuken
- Nalona Herron as Lynn
- Bill Nagel as Miner
- Andre Rosey Brown as "Sandman"
- Rowena Guinness as Jill McCarthy
- Michael Charles Friedman as Neuter
- Nils Allen Stewart as Zeed
- Tony Halme as Kemp
- David "Shark" Fralick as Man At Palace, Former North Star Martial Artist
- George Kee Cheung as Neville
- Michael Franco as AWOL Crossman 1
- David Loo as AWOL Crossman 2
- Susan French as Old Woman
- Chris DeRose as Oswald
- Darryl Chan as Novack
- Marisa Coughlan as Jenny
- Kate Geer as Mother

== Production ==
The film was a co-production between American company First Look Studios and Japanese company Ozla Pictures. The film was shot over the course of 30 days at a sound stage in New Orleans. Malcolm McDowell filmed all his scenes as Ryuken in just one day's worth of shooting.

== Release ==
The film premiered in Japan on April 22, 1995, featured actors from the Japanese dub of the anime voicing over their respective characters.

The film was released direct-to-video in the United States on November 5, 1996, following a run on cable television.

== Home media ==
The film was released on VHS and Laserdisc in the United States on February 2, 1996. It was released on DVD by First Look Home Entertainment on May 25, 2004. Alongside the dvd release of the film was a making of documentary called "North Star vs Southern Cross: The Making of Fist of the North Star" originally released in Japan, was included on the region 2 dvd release.

== Reception ==
The film was not reviewed by many mainstream critics, and it got mixed reviews from fans and online critics. Dave Foster of DVD Times panned the movie as a poor adaptation and commented that Kenshiro's pressure point techniques "look rather tame" in comparison to the way depicted in the manga and anime series. A reviewer from eFilmCritic remarked that Kenshiro's defeat at the hands of Shin "comes off as standard" and "unbelievably goofy" compared to the 1986 animated movie version.

== Cancelled sequels ==
In an interview with Scott Adkins on YouTube, Gary Daniels said that he signed a contract to do three films in the series, and that they likely would've happened if the film got a theatrical release and made more money.
