= Churasan 3 =

Japanese TV series

- Also known as: ちゅらさん３
- Based on: Churasan
- Written by: Yoshikazu Okada
- Starring: Ryoko Kuninaka; Kenji Kohashi; Shogo Suzuki
- Theme music composer: Ryoko Kuninaka
- Opening theme: Meguri Aeta Ne
- Ending theme: めぐり逢えたね
- Country of origin: Japan
- Original language: Japanese
- No. of seasons: 1
- No. of episodes: 5

Original release
- Release: September 13 – October 11, 2004

Churasan 3 (ちゅらさん３), also known as The Promise to The Chura Sea 3, is a 2004 Japanese television drama. It was broadcast as five episodes on NHK, from September 13 to October 11.

== Story ==
In the after events of Churasan II, it is now the celebration of the lunar new year. Eri and Fumiya have been visiting family in Okinawa with their son Kazuya. Eri continues her career as a nurse in Tokyo; she's now a visiting nurse while Fumiya continues to be a surgeon at Tokyo Hospital. Eri's grandma, affectionately called Obaa (granny), was last seen married, but now single again, presuming the husband she married died or left her shortly after.

Back Ippukan, Karinin and Shimada continues to be a loving elderly couple; Shibata and Yoki became parents to their first daughter and child, Shiori, and is loved by all. Shouko and Keitatsu are expecting their first child together, however, Keitatsu ran away as he felt severely pressured to be a good father and husband. Eri was the most upset as her own little brother would abandon Shouko and yet-to-be-born child in such a state. However, Fumiya calmed family nerves as he believes Keitatsu didn't do it for selfish reasons, but he due to the burden of responsibility. Shouko decided to move back to Okinawa to be tended by Eri's parents (her in-laws), believing that Keitatsu would eventually come home for their child.

Meanwhile, Eri and Haruka is minding a terminally ill patient, Tsujiuchi. However, her daughter, Aiko, is acting out due to her mother's illness and takes her anger upon the medics that only manage her mother's suffering, but not cure her. Mariya has been suffering writer's block and lost all inspiration to write her next great work. Seeing how Aiko is acting, Eri couldn't leave it alone and took a personal interest in helping out Tsujiuchi and Aiko. Things were a challenge at first, Aiko have trouble accepting the fact her mother is going to die soon. Eri at first invited Aiko to stay with her at Ippukan, but Aiko only ran back home; Eri decided something more drastic and take her to stay with her Okinawan family.

While in Okinawa, the Kohagura family took turns looking after her, showing Aiko the delights of life in Okinawa. Eri's older half-brother, Keisho, invented yet another variant of his beloved creation, Goya (bitter melon) Man, with the Goya Man Game (another likely product failure). Through Eri's reports about Aiko, Tsujiuchi is happy to learn that her daughter has developed a brighter attitude and wants to join her there. With Haruka's medical blessing, she was allowed to travel to Okinawa for the mother-daughter duo back together again. Both ladies were so happy to meet again and Tsujiuchi was especially happy to see Aiko changed for the better; Tsujiuchi was deeply touched when she saw her daughter perform a traditional Okinawan dance.

Inspired by recent events, Mariya used the story of Aiko as the basis for her new novel. Although a well-written story, the book didn't catch the attention she had hoped; she was proud to have it published nonetheless. With the help of good friends, Keitatsu was taught the meaning of rock is justice and what he's doing isn't cool at all. The explanation made him realize he needs to be with Shouko and he ran back home. Shouko was in labor and Keitatsu made it home shortly after the birth of their son. The story ends with the family celebrating a new family member.

== Cast and credits ==
- Screenwriter: Yoshikazu Okada

=== Cast ===
- Ryoko Kuninaka as Uemura Eri
- Kenji Kohashi as Uemura Fumiya
- Shogo Suzuki as Uemura Kazuya
- Kyoko Maya as Uemura Shizuko
- Masaaki Sakai as Kohagura Keibun
- Yoshiko Tanaka as Kohagura Katsuko
- Tomi Taira as Kohagura Hana
- Aiko Sato as Kohagura Nanako
- Gori as Kohabura Keisho
- Takayuki Yamada as Kohagura Keitatsu
- Ayumi Yamaguchi as Kohabura Shoko
- Takehiro Murata
- Kimiko Yo
- Kazuo Kitamura as Shimada Daishin
- Yatsuko Tanami as Shimada Mizue
- Miho Kanno as Jyonouchi Maria
- Manami Konishi as Haruka
- Hiroki Kawata as Shimabukuro Shoichi
- Shinobu Miyara as Yonabaru Makoto
- Keiko Toda as Shimoyanagi Satoko
- Hayato Fujiki as Kaneshiro Masahide
- Kaoru Okunuki
- Moeki Tsuruoka

=== Theme Song ===
Its theme song was "Meguri Aeta Ne" (めぐり逢えたね) Ryoko Kuninaka.

== See also ==
Related dramas:

- Churasan
- Churasan 2
