= Waru: kanketsu-hen =

- DVD cover
- Directed by: Takashi Miike
- Written by: Hisao Maki (manga and screenplay)
- Starring: Show Aikawa
- Release date: August 25, 2006 (Japan)
- Running time: 107 minutes
- Country: Japan
- Language: Japanese

Waru: kanketsu-hen (Japanese: 悪完結編) is a 2006 Japanese film directed by Takashi Miike. The film is a follow-up to Waru (2006).

== Cast ==
- Show Aikawa as Youji Himuro
- Yoshihiko Hakamada
- Ryo Ishibashi
- Tamio Kawaji
- Hikaru Kawamura
- Saki Kurihara
- Shion Machida
- Hisao Maki
- Keiko Matsuzaka
- Masumi Okada
- Johnny Okura
- Hitoshi Ozawa
- Atsuko Sakuraba
- Satoru Sayama
- Hideki Sone

== Reception ==
Panos Kotzathanasis of asianmoviepulse.com wrote that the film "is definitely among the worst films Miike ever shot, with its lack of quality becoming even grander when one considers the date it was shot, since, by 2006, Miike has already shot a number of his greatest films (Audition, Gozu, Agitator etc)."
