= Avec mon mari =

- DVD cover
- Directed by: Kentarō Ōtani
- Written by: Kentarō Ōtani
- Produced by: Kiichi Mutō
- Starring: Yuka Itaya; Hirofumi Kobayashi; Kaori Tsuji; Ren Ōsugi; Gō Inoue; Mayumi Terashima
- Cinematography: Kazuhiro Suzuki
- Music by: Reinaldo Poneda
- Production company: Mutō Kiichi Office
- Distributed by: Mutō Kiichi Office
- Release date: 6 March 1999 (Japan)
- Running time: 95 minutes
- Country: Japan
- Language: Japanese

Avec mon mari (Japanese: アベック モン マリ, Hepburn: Abekku mon mari) is a 1999 Japanese romantic comedy film directed by Kentarō Ōtani and starring Yuka Itaya, Hirofumi Kobayashi and Kaori Tsuji. It was released on 6 March 1999.

== Cast ==
- Yuka Itaya
- Hirofumi Kobayashi
- Kaori Tsuji
- Ren Ōsugi
- Gō Inoue
- Mayumi Terashima

== Reception ==
It was chosen as the 9th best film at the 21st Yokohama Film Festival.

Award	Date	Category	Recipients and nominees	Result
Yokohama Film Festival	2000	Best New Director	Kentarō Ōtani	Won
Yokohama Film Festival	2000	Best Newcomer	Yuka Itaya	Won
