= Looking for a True Fiancee =

- Directed by: Yuki Iwata
- Written by: Yuki Iwata
- Based on: Yubiwa wo Hametai by Takami Ito
- Starring: Takayuki Yamada; Manami Konishi; Yoko Maki; Chizuru Ikewaki
- Cinematography: Shuhei Onaga
- Music by: Mino Kabasawa
- Release date: November 19, 2011 (Japan)
- Running time: 108 minutes
- Country: Japan
- Language: Japanese

Looking for a True Fiancee (指輪をはめたい, Yubiwa o Hametai) is a 2011 Japanese film directed by Yuki Iwata and based on a novel by Takami Itō.

== Cast ==
- Takayuki Yamada as Teruhiko Katayama
- Manami Konishi as Chie Sumitomo
- Yoko Maki as Shiozaki Megumi
- Chizuru Ikewaki as Wakako Suzuki
- Fumi Nikaidō

== Reception ==
Russell Edwards of Variety criticized the film, saying: "Iwata lacks the timing needed to make this romantic comedy work."

Mark Schilling of The Japan Times said, "Iwata evidences a surreal visual flair in the early scenes especially, as in the dreamy shot of revolving shadows resolving into spinning ice skaters to injured Teruhiko's woozy eyes."
