= Sakuraba =

Sakuraba (written: 桜庭 lit. "cherry blossom garden") is a Japanese surname that may refer to:

- Atsuko Sakuraba (born 1976), Japanese gravure idol, tarento and actress
- Kazuki Sakuraba (born 1971), Japanese author of novels and light novels
- Kazushi Sakuraba (born 1969), Japanese mixed martial artist and professional wrestler
- Koharu Sakuraba, manga author
- Motoi Sakuraba (born 1965), Japanese composer, arranger, and musician
- Nanami Sakuraba (born 1992), Japanese gravure idol, actress and singer

Fictional characters:

- Aoi Sakuraba, a fictional character from the manga and anime series Ai Yori Aoshi.
- Milfeulle Sakuraba, a fictional character from the anime Galaxy Angel
- Neku Sakuraba, a fictional character in the Nintendo DS video game The World Ends with You
