= Yuki Iwata =

Japanese film director and illustrator (born 1972)

- 岩田 ユキ
- Born: Shimada, Shizuoka, Japan
- Occupations: Cartoonist, Film director
- Notable work: Looking for a True Fiancée

Yuki Iwata (岩田 ユキ, Iwata Yuki; born 1972 in Shizuoka Prefecture) is a Japanese film director and illustrator.

== Career ==
Iwata is the director of the 2011 film Looking for a True Fiancee, which was based on a novel by Takami Itō.
