= Show Aikawa =

Japanese actor and composer (born 1961)

- 哀川 翔
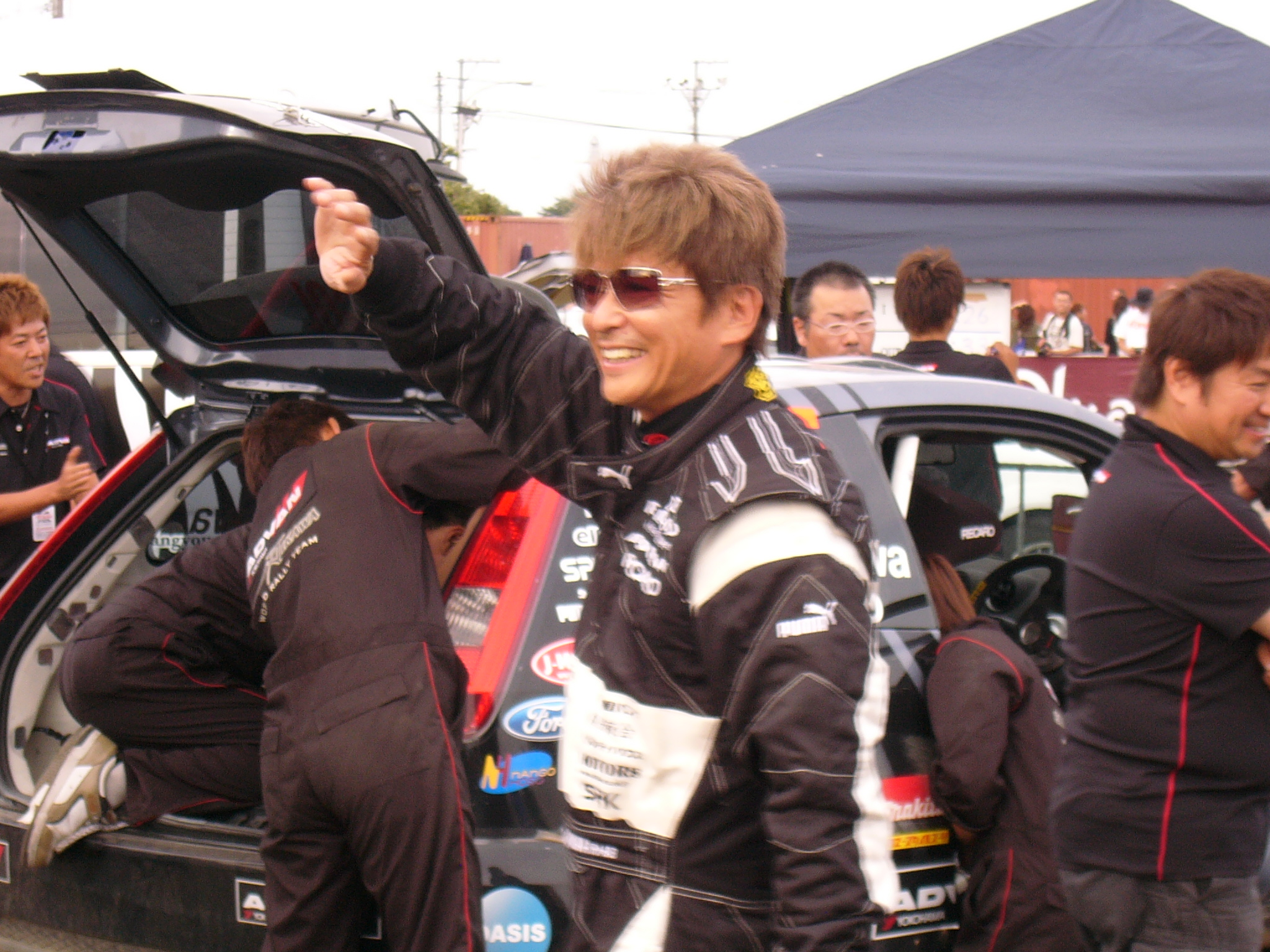
- Aikawa in 2010
- Born: Iehiro Fukuchi (福地 家宏, Fukuchi Iehiro); 24 May 1961 (age 64); Tokushima, Japan
- Occupation: Actor
- Years active: 1984–present
- Spouse: Kumi Aochi (m. 1995)
- Children: Momoko Fukuchi

Show Aikawa (哀川 翔, Aikawa Shō; born Iehiro Fukuchi (福地 家宏, Fukuchi Iehiro) on 24 May 1961) is a Japanese actor.

== Career ==
Show Aikawa was born in Tokushima and raised in Kagoshima. Aikawa has appeared in a number of Kiyoshi Kurosawa's films, including Eyes of the Spider, Serpent's Path, License to Live, Seance, and Pulse.

== Filmography ==
=== Films ===
- Orugoru (1989)
- Neo Chinpira: Zoom Goes the Bullet (1990)
- The Pale Hand (1990)
- Gokudo no Onna Tachi: Saigo no Tatakai (1990)
- Shishio Tachi no Natsu (1991)
- The Passage to Japan (1991)
- Torarete Tamaruka! (1992)
- Shishio Tachi no Saigo (1993)
- Torarete Tamaruka! 2 (1993)
- A New Love in Tokyo (1994)
- Like a Rolling Stone (1994)
- Torarete Tamaruka! 3 (1994)
- Kitanai Yatsu (1995)
- Suit Yourself or Shoot Yourself: The Heist (1995)
- Suit Yourself or Shoot Yourself: The Escape (1995)
- Suit Yourself or Shoot Yourself: The Loot (1995)
- Suit Yourself or Shoot Yourself: The Reversal (1995)
- Suit Yourself or Shoot Yourself: The Nouveau Riche (1996)
- Suit Yourself or Shoot Yourself: The Hero (1996)
- Otokotachi no Kaita E (1996)
- The Revenge: A Visit from Fate (1996)
- The Revenge: A Scar That Never Fades (1996)
- Peking Man (1997)
- Rainy Dog (1997)
- The Eel (1997)
- The Fire Within (1997)
- Serpent's Path (1997)
- Eyes of the Spider (1997)
- Blood (1998)
- License to Live (1998)
- Shiawase ni Naro ne (1998)
- Dead or Alive (1999)
- Saraba Gokudo: Dead Beat (1999)
- Ley Lines (1999)
- Dead or Alive 2: Birds (2000)
- New Battles Without Honor and Humanity (2000)
- Seance (2000)
- Otokogi (2000)
- Rush! (2001)
- Pulse (2001)
- Yomigaeri (2002)
- Muscle Heat (2002)
- Shangri-La (2002)
- True Record of an Ando Gang Side-Story: Starving Wolf's Rules (2002)
- Dead or Alive: Final (2002)
- Kisarazu Cat's Eye: Nihon Series (2003)
- Dekotora no Shu (2003)
- Gozu (2003)
- Tokyo Wankei: Destiny of Love (2004)
- Out of This World (2004)
- Dekotora no Shu 2 (2004)
- Zebraman (2004)
- Tokyo Zombie (2005)
- Tobi ga Kururi to (2005)
- The Suspect: Muroi Shinji (2005)
- Specter (2005)
- Makoto (2005)
- Dekotora no Shu 3 (2005)
- Waru: kanketsu-hen (2006)
- Taiyo no Kizu (2006)
- Waru (2006)
- Dekotora no Shu 4 (2006)
- SS (2008)
- Kurosagi (2008)
- Dekotora no Shu 5 (2008)
- Drop (2009)
- Zebraman 2: Attack on Zebra City (2010)
- Me o Tojite Giragira (2011)
- Helter Skelter (2012)
- Z Island (2015)
- Patalliro! (2019)
- What Happened to Our Nest Egg!? (2021)
- Dekotora no Shu 6 (2021)
- One Last Bloom (2023)
- Old Car (2023), Genta
- Voice (2024)

=== Television ===
- Tsubasa (1994)
- Kisarazu Cat's Eye (2002)
- Kurosagi (2006)
- Garo: Makai No Hana (Eiji Busujima) (2014)
- Sanada Maru (2016), Gotō Matabei
- Maiagare! (2022–23), Gō Kido

=== Video games ===
- Yakuza 5 (2012), Kouichi Takasugi

=== Dubbing ===
- Peter Rabbit 2: The Runaway (2021), Barnabas
