= The Zen Diary =

2022 film by Yuji Nakae

- 土を喰らう十二ヵ月
- Directed by: Yuji Nakae
- Written by: Yuji Nakae
- Based on: Tsuchi o Kū Hibi: Waga Shōjin Jūni-Kagetsu by Tsutomu Mizukami
- Produced by: Yasutaka Fuke; Kenichi Yoshida; Kōsuke Oshida; Mariko Arai
- Starring: Kenji Sawada; Takako Matsu; Toshinori Omi; Naomi Nishida; Koihachi Takigawa; Fumi Dan; Shōhei Hino; Tomoko Naraoka
- Cinematography: Hirotaka Matsune
- Edited by: Ryūji Miyajima
- Music by: Otomo Yoshihide
- Production company: Office Shirous
- Distributed by: Nikkatsu
- Release date: 11 November 2022
- Running time: 111 minutes
- Country: Japan
- Language: Japanese
- Box office: ¥265 million

The Zen Diary (Japanese: 土を喰らう十二ヵ月, romanized: Tsuchi o kurau jūni-kagetsu, lit. 'Twelve Months of Devouring Soil') is a 2022 film directed by Yuji Nakae. The film is an adaptation of the 1978 nonfiction book by Tsutomu Mizukami.

== Summary ==
Elderly writer Tsutomu lives alone with his pet dog "Prickly-ash" in a mountain cottage in Shinshū. Having been sent to serve at a Zen temple at age nine where he learned Buddhist cuisine, he now grows his own vegetables, forages for edible wild plants, and cooks. He records this daily life in his manuscripts. Occasionally, his editor and young lover Machiko visits him, eating the meals he prepares with obvious relish. Tsutomu has yet to inter the ashes of his wife, Yaeko, who died thirteen years ago.

When Tsutomu visits Yaeko's mother, Chie, she reproaches him for not having built a grave for Yaeko. Chie later passes away. Her funeral is held at Tsutomu's mountain cottage. Machiko rushes from Tokyo and is busy preparing for the funeral.

After the funeral, Tsutomu suggests Machiko move into the mountain cottage, but she replies she needs time to think about it. Shortly after, Tsutomu suffers a heart attack and collapses. Concerned, Machiko offers to live with him, but Tsutomu, who had begun deeply contemplating death, declines.

At night, even when he goes to sleep prepared to die, morning still comes unchanged. Tsutomu scatters Chie and Yaeko's ashes into the lake. Later, Machiko comes to tell him she is engaged to another young novelist. Tsutomu congratulates her and sends her on her way. In the snow-covered mountain cottage, he clasps his hands as he faces a carefully prepared meal.

== Cast ==
- Kenji Sawada as Tsutomu
- Takako Matsu as Machiko
- Naomi Nishida as Mika
- Toshinori Omi as Takashi
- Koihachi Takigawa as Photographer
- Fumi Dan as Fumiko
- Shōhei Hino as Carpenter
- Tomoko Naraoka as Chie
