= Directors Guild of Japan New Directors Award =

Japanese award

The Directors Guild of Japan New Directors Award (日本映画監督協会新人賞, Nihon Eiga Kantoku Kyōkai Shinjinshō) is given annually by the Directors Guild of Japan to a new director of a film released that year who is considered the most "suitable" for the award. The winner is selected by a committee formed of DGJ members. All formats—feature film, documentary, television, video, etc.—are eligible for consideration. In some years when there was no apparent winner, the Guild only issued a "citation" (奨励賞 (shōreishō)) or did not give out the award. Multiple awards have been given in other years. With a long history, many of Japan's major postwar directors have received the award, including Nagisa Ōshima, Susumu Hani, Yoshimitsu Morita, Masayuki Suo, Takeshi Kitano, and Shunji Iwai.

== Recipients ==
Recipients of the Directors Guild of Japan New Directors Award

Year	Winner	Film	Notes
1960	Nagisa Ōshima	Cruel Story of Youth	
1961	Susumu Hani	Bad Boys	
1962	Kirio Urayama	Foundry Town	
1963			No award
1964			No award
1965	Kei Kumai	Nihon Rettō	
1966	Sadao Nakajima	Yakuza (893) Gurentai	
1967	Toshiya Fujita	Hikō Shōnen: Hinode no Sakebi	
1968			No award
1969	Masanobu Deme	Oretachi no Kōya	Citation only
1970	Shinsuke Ogawa	Summer in Narita	
1971	Yōichi Higashi	Yasashii Nipponjin	
1972	Shunya Itō	Female Convict 701: Scorpion	Citation only
1973	Noboru Tanaka	Confidential: The Hell of Tortured Prostitutes	Citation only
1974			No award
1975			No award
1976	Seijirō Kōyama	Futatsu no Hāmonika	Citation only
1977	Hōjin Hashiura	Hoshizora no Marionetto	
1978			No award
1979	Claude Gagnon	Keiko	
1980	Kōhei Oguri	Muddy River	Citation only
1981	Kazuyuki Izutsu	Gaki Teikoku	Citation only
1982			No award
1983	Yoshimitsu Morita	The Family Game	
1984			No award
1985	Shinichirō Sawai	Early Spring Story	
1986	Kazuo Hara	The Emperor's Naked Army Marches On	
1987	Masashi Yamamoto	Robinson's Garden	
1988	Uson Kim	Yun's Town	
1989	Junji Sakamoto	Dotsuitarunen	Two winners
1989	Gō Takamine	Untamagiru	Two winners
1990	Takeshi Kitano	Boiling Point	Two winners; citation only
1990	Fumiki Watanabe	Shimaguni Konjō	Two winners; citation only
1991	Masayuki Suo	Sumo Do, Sumo Don't	
1992	Hideyuki Hirayama	The Games Teachers Play	Multiple winners
1992	Tsutomu Makiya	Pineapple Tours	Multiple winners
1992	Yūji Nakae	Pineapple Tours	Multiple winners
1992	Hayashi Tōma	Pineapple Tours	Multiple winners
1993	Shunji Iwai	Fireworks, Should We See It from the Side or the Bottom?	Two winners
1993	Yasunori Terada	My Wife Is Filipina	Two winners
1994	Tomoyuki Furumaya	This Window Is Yours	
1995	Gō Rijū	Berlin	
1996	Isshin Inudō	Two People Talking	
1997	Masato Hara	Twentieth Century Nostalgia	
1998	Toshiaki Toyoda	Pornostar	
1999	Akihiko Shiota	Moonlight Whispers; Don't Look Back	
2000	Akira Ogata	Boy's Choir	
2001	Masato Ishioka	Scoutman aka Pain	
2002	Sujin Kim	Through the Night	
2003	Kiyoshi Sasabe	Chirusoku no Natsu	
2004	Nami Iguchi	Dogs & Cats	
2005	Izumi Takahashi	The Soup, One Morning	
2006	Shōtarō Kobayashi	Kazoku no Hiketsu	
2007	Satoko Yokohama	German + Rain	
2008	Yuki Tanada	One Million Yen Girl	
2009	Yū Irie	8000 Miles	
2010	Tatsushi Ōmori	Kenta to Jun to Kayo-chan no Kuni	
2011	Mami Sunada	Death of a Japanese Salesman	
2012	Ryūichi Shimada	Doko ni mo ikenai	
2013	Masahide Ichii	Hakoiri musuko no koi	
2014	Keiichi Kobayashi	About the Pink Sky	
2015	Daishi Matsunaga	Pieta in the Toilet	
2016	Shoji Hiroshi	Ken and Kazu	
2017	Isora Iwakiri	The Blooming	
2018	Shinichiro Ueda	One Cut of the Dead	
2019	Toshiyuki Teruya	Senkotsu	
2020	HIKARI	37 Seconds	
2021	Shinzo Katayama	Sagasu	
2022	Juichiro Yamasaki	Yamabuki	
2023	Masaaki Kudo	Toi tokoro	
2024	Neo Sora	Happyend	
