= Waru (2006 film) =

- DVD cover
- Directed by: Takashi Miike
- Written by: Hisao Maki (manga and screenplay)
- Produced by: Kanemi Kawanaka; Yoshihisa Yamamoto
- Starring: Show Aikawa; Keiko Matsuzaka; Ryo Ishibashi; Keiko Matsuzaka
- Cinematography: Kazunari Tanaka
- Release date: 2006
- Running time: 84 minutes
- Country: Japan
- Language: Japanese

Waru (Japanese: 悪) is a 2006 Japanese crime action film directed by Takashi Miike. The sequel, Waru: kanketsu-hen, followed later in the year.

== Cast ==
- Show Aikawa as Yoji Himuro
- Nagare Hagiwara as Luo
- Yoshihiko Hakamada as Genji
- Ryo Ishibashi as Sakuragi
- Hisao Maki
- Keiko Matsuzaka as Reiko Misugi
- Johnny Okura
- Hitoshi Ozawa
- Atsuko Sakuraba
- Hideki Sone
- Kimika Yoshino
- Akira Maeda
- Satoru Sayama
- Guts Ishimatsu
