= W's Tragedy =

- Blu-ray disc cover
- Directed by: Shinichirō Sawai
- Screenplay by: Haruhiko Arai; Shinichirō Sawai
- Based on: Murder at Mt. Fuji by Shizuko Natsuki
- Produced by: Tsuneo Seto; Ryoji Ito; Mitsuru Kurosawa; Haruki Kadokawa
- Starring: Hiroko Yakushimaru; Yoshiko Mita
- Cinematography: Seizō Sengen
- Edited by: Kiyoaki Saitō
- Music by: Joe Hisaishi
- Distributed by: Toei Company
- Release date: December 15, 1984 (Japan)
- Running time: 108 minutes
- Country: Japan
- Language: Japanese
- Box office: ¥1.55 billion

W's Tragedy (Japanese: Wの悲劇, Hepburn: Daburyū no Higeki) is a 1984 Japanese film directed by Shinichirō Sawai, based on the novel by Shizuko Natsuki (published in English under the title Murder at Mt. Fuji). At the 9th Japan Academy Prize it won three awards and received three other nominations.

== Plot ==
Natsuki's original book W no Higeki, the story of a rich family torn apart by the murder of their patriarch, and their heiress being accused of the crime, becomes a play and is acted out by a troupe of actors in Osaka. The role of the heroine is contended for by young Shizuka Mita (Yakushimaru), who dreams of fame and fortune. Shizuka is taken under the wing of famous actress Sho Hatori (Y. Mita), whose rich patron died in her arms one night, and who agrees to let Shizuka stand in for her. As the play is acted out, Shizuka realizes that many scenes in the play begin to have parallels with real life...

The film takes the form of a story within a story, in which the original book's characters are acted out by the film's characters.

== Cast ==
- Hiroko Yakushimaru as Shizuka Mita, who plays rich heiress Mako Watsuji on stage
- Yoshiko Mita as Sho Hatori, who plays Mako's mother Yoshie Watsuji
- Masanori Sera as Akio Morita, Shizuka's boyfriend and mentor off stage
- Kunihiko Mitamura as Jun Godai, who plays investigator Ukyo Nakazato
- Miho Takagi as Kaori Kikuchi, the actress Shizuka relegated from the Mako role
- Ken Nishida as Koji Shirota, who plays Shohei Mazaki, the victim's doctor
- Kōjirō Kusanagi as Kaichi Kiuchi, who plays Shigeru Watsuji, Mako's grand-uncle

== Production ==
=== Writing ===
W no Higeki was a popular mystery novel published in 1982 that became the most successful work of Shizuko Natsuki, now considered a master of the genre. In it, a wealthy family, the Watsuji's, are in one of their mansions for New Year's holidays when the daughter and future heiress Mako declares that she has murdered her grandfather with a knife. The director Shinichirō Sawai came up with the idea of using the novel's plot as a stage play within another story instead of writing a conventional adaptation.

=== Filming ===
With their script, Haruhiko Arai and Sawai wanted to pay homage to All about Eve, the classic of Joseph L. Mankiewicz, who both loved. The character of Shizuka was originally more ambitious and meaner towards Hatori, but this was changed by the producer Haruki Kadokawa to "keep clean [Hiroko Yakushimaru's] image of idol".

Filming began on July 22, 1984, and wrapped on September 22. It took 35 working days and a total of 385 shots. The Osaka performance had 1,300 Yakushimaru fans as extras, and the Tokyo performance had 1,500 people.

Due to her difficult role, troubles with acting out the stage scenes (something she considered herself to not be good at), and the strict direction of Sawai, Yakushimaru ended up physically and mentally exhausted by the end of production. Meanwhile, the original cut of the movie had many key scenes removed, causing some confusing plot holes.

The final scene was originally supposed to be a happy ending where Shizuka and Akio get together, but Kadokawa requested that they not marry, so the two of them go their separate ways.

== Reaction ==
It grossed 1.55 billion yen, making it the fourth-highest grossing Japanese film of 1985.

After the premiere, Yakushimaru felt very displeased with her own performance and seriously considered leaving her acting career forever. Ironically, she won the Blue Ribbon Award for Best Actress for her performance. After she picked up the award, she declared "This movie really burnt me".

== Theme song ==
- "Woman (W no Higeki) Yori", original lyrics by Takashi Matsumoto, vocals by Hiroko Yakushimaru.

This song has also been covered by Yumi Matsutoya, Yūko Andō, Akina Nakamori and Ken Hirai, the latter version being used for the 2012 iteration of the book's story into a TV drama.

== Awards and nominations ==
9th Japan Academy Prize

- Won: Best Director - Shinichirō Sawai
- Won: Best Actress in a Supporting Role - Yoshiko Mita
- Won: Best Sound Recording - Fumio Hashimoto
- Nominated: Best Picture
- Nominated: Best Screenplay - Haruhiko Arai and Shinichirō Sawai
- Nominated: Best Actress - Hiroko Yakushimaru

27th Blue Ribbon Awards

- Won: Best Actress - Hiroko Yakushimaru

10th Hochi Film Award

- Won: Best Supporting Actress - Yoshiko Mita

7th Yokohama Film Festival

- 3rd Best Film
