= Dead or Alive: Final =

- Theatrical release poster
- Directed by: Takashi Miike
- Written by: Hitoshi Ishikawa; Yoshinobu Kamo; Ichiro Ryu
- Produced by: Yoshihiro Masuda; Makoto Okada
- Starring: Riki Takeuchi; Show Aikawa
- Cinematography: Kazunari Tanaka
- Edited by: Shuuwa Kōgen
- Music by: Kōji Endō
- Distributed by: Daiei (Japan); Sony Pictures (U.S.)
- Release date: January 12, 2002
- Running time: 89 minutes
- Country: Japan
- Languages: Japanese; Cantonese; English

Dead or Alive: Final is a 2002 Japanese cyberpunk science fiction film directed by Takashi Miike. It is the third in a three-part series, preceded by Dead or Alive in 1999 and Dead or Alive 2: Birds in 2000. The films are not connected in any apparent way except by director Takashi Miike and stars Riki Takeuchi and Show Aikawa. Besides Japanese, much of the dialogue in the film is in Cantonese and some is in English. Often, two people will talk to each other using different languages.

== Plot ==
In the 24th century C.E., Yokohama has grown massively and is under the control of Mayor Woo. As mayor, Woo has begun forcibly sterilizing the local population, forcing all citizens to take birth control pills. His laws are enforced by a loyal officer, Takeshi Honda. Ryo, an aimless drifter, is attacked by government forces; during the ensuing fight, Honda realises that Ryo is a replicant left over from a civilization ending war. Ryo eludes capture and follows a child who had previously been asking him for food back to the base of a rebel outfit intent on ending Woo's tyrannical regime. Some of the rebels had been captured earlier and Woo has spent many hours trying to persuade them to give up their children and turn against the rebels. With Ryo on their side and believing that now is the perfect time to strike, the rebels attempt to kidnap Mayor Woo at a public event in order to ransom him for their captured friends. During the attempted kidnapping internal divisions boil over when some members of the group start stealing valuables from guests, Woo signals his body guards and they begin fighting back. The mission aborted, the group of rebels make their way outside and commandeer a school bus, realizing that one child, Honda's son, remains on board. Returning to their base, the child who met Ryo befriends him. The group's internal divisions end in a coup where a group ousts the leader before themselves being incapacitated or killed by Ryo, leaving only a skeleton force.

Seeing Honda's son as akin to a grandson, Woo agrees to trading him back for the prisoners of the rebels. They agree to meet and Honda's son is returned as are the prisoners. One couple, however, made a deal with Woo, and upon leaving the prisoner transport system, opens fire on the group, killing most of them - including the leader. Ryo, the boy and a surviving rebel go into hiding, leaving another rebel alone to wander off. They come across a movie theater and the boy manages to sneak Honda's son out to join them. Honda tracks them down and fights with Ryo until his son appears and urges him to stop. He takes him home and both men agree to fight again some other time. Honda returns home and discovers that his wife is a replicant, confronting Woo he discovers that he is also a replicant, as is his son. As part of his programming he is unable to attack Woo who reveals that his plan to sterilize everyone has grown from the belief that the "Old World" was limiting and unnecessary. Leaving, Honda meets up with Ryo where they fight as images from the previous two Dead or Alive films are intercut. They accidentally merge into a penis-headed mecha and agree to stop fighting to take down Mayor Woo. They take flight and the film cuts to Woo in shock whilst in the middle of having sex.

== Cast ==
- Show Aikawa as Ryō
- Maria Chen as Michelle
- Richard Chen as Dictator Woo
- Jason Chu as Prisoner
- Josie Ho as Jun
- Tony Ho as Ping
- Hiroyoshi Komuro
- Ken Lo as Gangster
- Christepher Wee as Husband of Pregnant Woman
- Rachel Ngan as Pregnant Woman
- Don Tai as Don
- Riki Takeuchi as Officer Takeshi Honda
- William Tuen as Gangster
- Terence Yin as Fong

== Other credits ==
- Film Editing by: Shuuwa Kōgen
- Production Manager: Hirofumi Yamabe
- Assistant Directors
  - Kimiyoshi Adachi
  - Masato Tanno
- Action choreographer: Chung Chi Li
- Produced by:
  - Toshiki Kimura: associate producer for Excellent Film
  - Mitsuru Kurosawa: executive producer for Toei Video
  - Yoshihiro Masuda: producer for Daiei
  - Makoto Okada: producer for Toei Video
  - Ken Takeuchi: planner
  - Tsutomu Tsuchikawa: executive producer for Daiei

== Reception ==
From contemporary reviews, Derek Elley (Variety) described the film as "relatively low key after the ultra-violent opener, "Dead or Alive" (1999) and lesser-known middle entry, "Dead or Alive 2: Birds" (2000)". Elley stated that the film "wanders in the middle but is generally tightly constructed, with energetic perfs. Action, choreographed by Chang Chi-li, is OK". On Metacritic the film has a score of 34% based on reviews from 7 critics, indicating "generally unfavourable reviews".
