= Dead or Alive 2: Birds =

- Japanese theatrical release poster
- Directed by: Takashi Miike
- Written by: Masa Nakamura
- Produced by: Yoshihiro Masuda; Makoto Okada
- Starring: Show Aikawa; Riki Takeuchi
- Cinematography: Kazunari Tanaka
- Music by: Chu Ishikawa
- Distributed by: Daiei Film
- Release dates: December 2, 2000 (Japan); November 11, 2001 (United Kingdom)
- Running time: 97 minutes
- Country: Japan
- Language: Japanese

Dead or Alive 2: Birds (DEAD OR ALIVE 2: 逃亡者, Deddo oa araibu 2: Toubousha, Lit. "Dead or Alive 2: Fugitives") is a 2000 Japanese film directed by Takashi Miike. Dead or Alive 2: Birds is unrelated to Dead or Alive (1999) or Dead or Alive: Final (2002) except that all three films have Show Aikawa and Riki Takeuchi in them, and they are all directed by Takashi Miike.

== Plot ==
Mizuki is an assassin being contracted by an organised gang in the midst of a yakuza-triad turf war. He is hired to kill an officer in the rival gang. While setting up his shot, someone else gets to his target first; he recognises the person but can't remember who they were. Returning to his base of operations, he lies by saying he successfully assassinated the target, taking the money given to him by the contractor. After doing some research, he finds out that the other assassin goes by the name 'Mizuki Kohei' and begins to track him down. While making a booking over the phone he runs into his contractors who attack him, deciding to lie low, he makes the decision to return to his childhood home: an island off the coast of Japan.

The other assassin, fearing the heat of his actions, also decides to go into hiding. Both assassins buy noodles, as it separately reminds them of trips they made to the mainland as children. Mizuki notices the other assassin onboard the ferry and follows him onto the island. Upon confronting him, he reveals his name to be Shuuichi, his childhood friend. The two agree to hold off on the killings and begin to reminisce about their past.

A flashback sequence shows Shuuichi and Mizuki with their friend Kohei as children playing on the beach. Their life at the orphanage having been routine but welcoming, the orphanage's head was a devout Roman Catholic. Eventually Mizuki was adopted to the mainland while Shuu and Kohei grew older, he sent regular letters, but they eventually stopped coming through. It is revealed that many of these letters were faked for a long while after Mizuki's adopted parent takes his own life. Fearing the religious burden of suicide having been brought up Catholic and the possibility of facing the bureaucracy of child protective services, Mizuki ran away.

The two assassins reunite with Kohei who takes them to various places on the island from when they were children, including the local school where they reminisce, challenge each other to physical tasks and play football. Kohei puts them up at his house with his pregnant wife, and encourages them to visit the orphanage's old head, who has since suffered horrific burns from an accident, rendering him immobile. After visiting their old guardian, they watch a number of old Super 8 films of their trips and adventures together as children. While they do this, a travelling theatre group arrive on the island and get into an unfortunate accident, leaving two of them unable to perform for the children as planned. Shuu overhears their concerns and offers his and Mizuki's services to the theatre company. Despite concerns from the orphanage's new head, the performance goes off without a hitch. Back on the mainland, the gang war becomes increasingly violent and unsustainable.

Kohei's wife sees a newspaper clipping of Shuu's involvement with the initial killings, and one of them witnesses the old orphanage's head watch a news item that identifies them as assassins. Having reflected on their past selves, the two assassins decide to team up and fight the yakuza and triads, taking their money and funnelling it into water and medicinal supplies for children in Africa. They raise an exponential sum of money before Shuu reveals that he has a deteriorating medical condition. The two assassins are confronted by the last of the gangs' men, they succeed in killing them but are severely wounded. They both decide to return to the island one final time. They order the noodles together, and having finished, Mizuki dies in Shuu's arms. They land on the shore, and Shuu carries Mizuki's body up a tall hillside overlooking the harbour. The film cuts to images of their childhood together before showing both men, dead together on the hillside.

An insert reads: "WHERE ARE YOU GOING?" before showing Kohei and Chi return from the hospital with their new-born baby.

== Cast ==
- Show Aikawa as Mizuki Okamoto
- Riki Takeuchi as Shuuichi Sawada
- Noriko Aota as Chi, Kōhei's wife
- Edison Chen as Boo
- Kenichi Endō as Kōhei
- Hiroko Isayama
- Masato as Hoo
- Yuichi Minato as Head of orphanage
- Ren Osugi (credited as Red Ohsugi) as Mizuki's stepfather
- Manzō Shinra
- Tomorowo Taguchi as Man with telescope
- Teah as Woo
- Toru Tezuka
- Shinya Tsukamoto as Magician Higashino
- Yoshiyuki Yamaguchi

== Other credits ==
- Produced by:
  - Toshiki Kimura: associate producer for Excellent Film
  - Mitsuru Kurosawa: executive producer for Toei Video
  - Yoshihiro Masuda: producer for Daiei
  - Makoto Okada: producer for Toei Video
  - Tsutomu Tsuchikawa: executive producer for Daiei
- Film Editing by: Yasushi Shimamura
- Production Design by: Akira Ishige
- Sound Department: Mitsugu Shiratori (sound)

== Release ==
=== Theatrical ===
The film released in Japan on 2 December 2000. The film premiered internationally in 2001 at the BFI London Film Festival, Vancouver International Film Festival and Fantasia Film Festival. In 2002, the film was shown at the Buenos Aires International Festival of Independent Cinema.

=== Home media ===
Arrow Video released a set of the Dead or Alive trilogy on Blu-ray in 2017. The transfers were mixed with stereo audio. The release included with interviews with the cast, and featurettes filmed during the film's production.
