= 1993 in Japanese television =

Events in 1993 in Japanese television.

== Debuts ==
Show	Station	Premiere Date	Genre	Original Run
The Brave Express Might Gaine	Nagoya TV	January 30th	anime	January 30, 1993 – January 22, 1994
Ghost Sweeper Mikami	TV Asahi	April 11th	anime	April 11, 1993 – March 6, 1994
Iron Chef	Fuji TV	October 10th	game show	October 10, 1993 – September 24, 1999
Nintama Rantarou	NHK	April 10th	anime	April 10, 1993 - present
Gridman the Hyper Agent	TBS	April 3rd	tokusatsu	April 3, 1993 – January 8, 1994
Gosei Sentai Dairanger	TV Asahi	February 19th	tokusatsu	February 19, 1993 – February 11, 1994
Sailor Moon R	TV Asahi	March 6th	anime	March 6, 1993 - March 12, 1994
Shima Shima Tora no Shimajirou	TV Setouchi	December 13th	anime	December 13, 1993 - March 31, 2008
Shippuu! Iron Leaguer	TV Tokyo	April 6th	anime	April 6, 1993 - March 25, 1994
Tama of Third Street: Do You Know My Tama?	MBS	July 3rd	anime	July 3, 1993 – August 28, 1993
Tokusou Robo Janperson	TV Asahi	January 31st	tokusatsu	January 31, 1993 – January 23, 1994
Kenyuu Densetsu Yaiba	TV Tokyo	April 9th	anime	April 9, 1993 – April 1, 1994

== Ongoing shows ==
- Music Fair, music (1964–present)
- Mito Kōmon, jidaigeki (1969–2011)
- Sazae-san, anime (1969–present)
- Ōoka Echizen, jidaigeki (1970–1999)
- FNS Music Festival, music (1974–present)
- Panel Quiz Attack 25, game show (1975–present)
- Doraemon, anime (1979–2005)
- Kiteretsu Daihyakka, anime (1988–1996)
- Soreike! Anpanman, anime (1988–present)
- Dragon Ball Z, anime (1989–1996)
- Downtown no Gaki no Tsukai ya Arahende!!, game show (1989–present)
- Soreike! Anpanman, anime (1988–present)
- Cooking Papa, anime (1992–1995)
- YuYu Hakusho, anime (1992–1995)
- Crayon Shin-chan, anime (1992–present)
- Sailor Moon, anime (1992–1997)

== Endings ==
Show	Station	Ending Date	Genre	Original Run
The Brave Fighter of Legend Da-Garn	Nagoya TV	January 23rd	anime	February 8, 1992 – January 23, 1993
Kyoryu Sentai Zyuranger	TV Asahi	February 12th	tokusatsu	February 21, 1992 – February 12, 1993
Sailor Moon	TV Asahi	February 27th	anime	March 7, 1992 - February 27, 1993
Space Knight Tekkaman Blade	TV Tokyo	February 2nd	anime	February 18, 1992 - February 2, 1993
Tama of Third Street: Do You Know My Tama?	MBS	August 28th	anime	July 3, 1993 – August 28, 1993
The Girl in the Wind: Jeanie with the Light Brown Hair	TV Tokyo	September 30th	anime	October 15, 1992 - September 30, 1993
Tokusou Exceedraft	TV Asahi	January 24th	tokusatsu	February 2, 1992 – January 24, 1993

== See also ==
- 1993 in anime
- List of Japanese television dramas
- 1993 in Japan
- List of Japanese films of 1993
