= Ryōko Kuninaka =

Japanese actress and singer (born 1979)

- 国仲涼子
- Born: 9 June 1979 (age 47); Naha, Okinawa, Japan
- Years active: 1998–present
- Spouse: Osamu Mukai
- Children: 2
- Website: www.rising-pro.jp/artist/kuninaka/

Ryōko Kuninaka (国仲 涼子, Kuninaka Ryōko; born June 9, 1979) is a Japanese actress and singer. She hails from Naha City in Okinawa, Japan and currently works for Vision Factory. In 2014, she married actor Osamu Mukai.

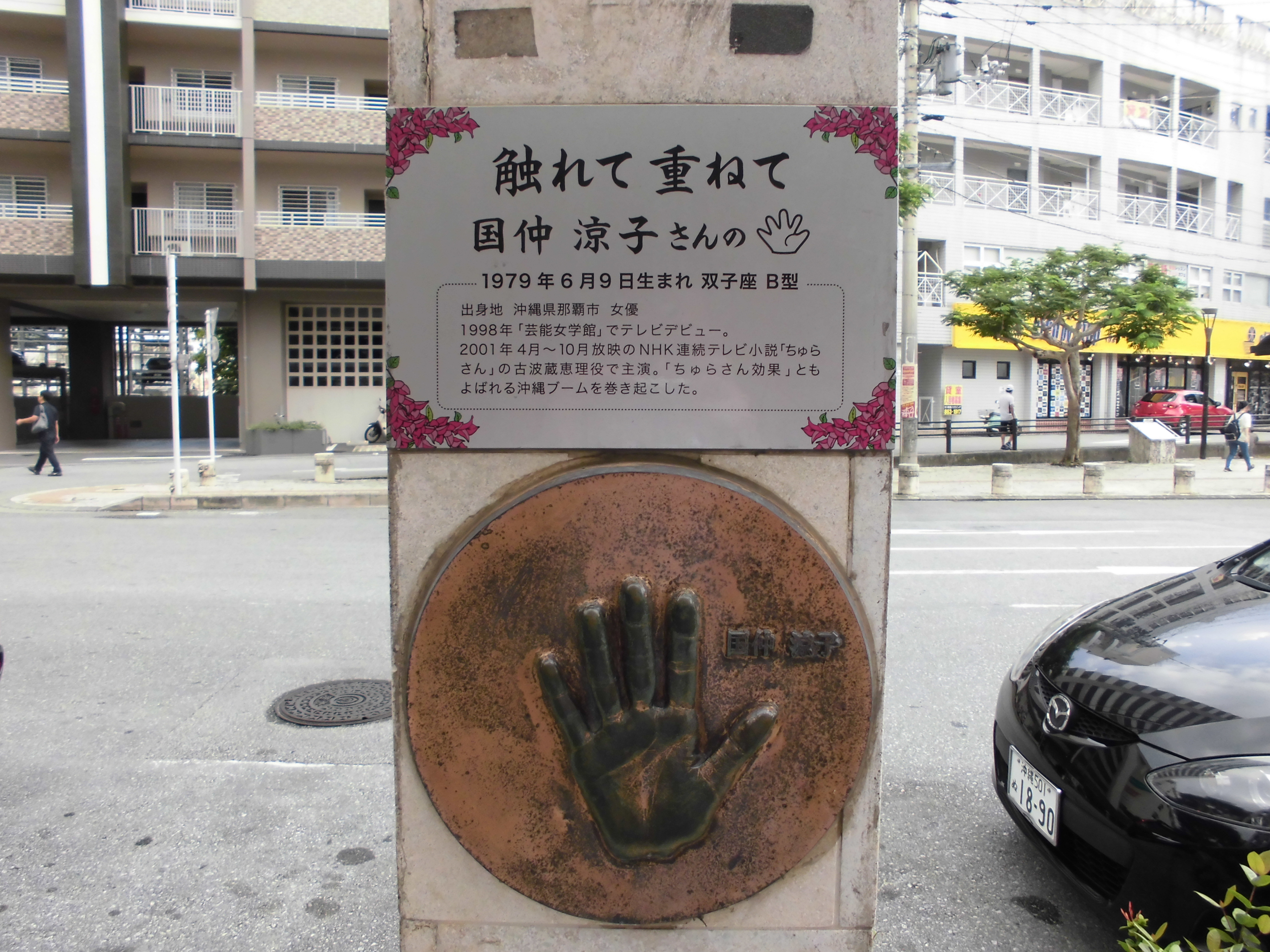
Handprint of Ryōko Kuninaka in Naha, Okinawa

== Filmography ==
=== Television ===
- Churasan (2001)
- Churasan 2 (2003)
- Churasan 3 (2004)
- Churasan 4 (2007)
- Dear Radiance (2024), Chiyaha
- Blossom (2026), Ryo Hano

=== Movies ===
- My Darling is a Foreigner (2010), Mika Oguri.
- 366 Days (2025), Akari Tamashiro
- The Tiger and Her Wings: The Movie (2027), Yoshiko Higa

== Awards and nominations ==
Year	Award	Category	Work(s)	Result	Ref.
2002	36th Elan d'or Awards	Newcomer of the Year	Herself	Won	
