= Z Island =

- Poster
- Zアイランド
- Directed by: Hiroshi Shinagawa
- Release date: May 16, 2015
- Running time: 108 minutes
- Country: Japan
- Box office: ¥23 million (Japan)

Z Island (Zアイランド, Z Airando) (released internationally as Deadman Inferno) is a 2015 Japanese action comedy zombie film directed by Hiroshi Shinagawa. It was released in Japan on May 16, 2015. A four-part mini-series prequel was also released.

== Cast ==
- Aikawa Shō as Hiroya Munakata
- Sawa Suzuki as Sakura
- Yūichi Kimura as Tammachi
- Daisuke Migakawa as Akira Yoshida
- Kubozuka Yōsuke as Shirakawa
- Shingo Tsurumi as Takashi
- Red Rice as Shinya
- Shunsuke Kazama as Shigeru
- Daigo as Uchida
- Kavka Shishido as Naomi
- Kunihiro Kawashima as Joe
- Maika Yamamoto as Hyuga
- Erina Mizuno as Seira
- Hannya as Sakuta
- Yukiko Shinohara as Megumi
- Hideo Nakano as Kiyama

== Reception ==
The film has grossed ¥23 million at the Japanese box office.
