= Dead or Alive (1999 film) =

- Japanese theatrical release poster
- Directed by: Takashi Miike
- Screenplay by: Ichiro Ryu
- Produced by: Makoto Okada; Katsumi Ono; Toshiki Kimura
- Starring: Riki Takeuchi; Show Aikawa; Renji Ishibashi
- Cinematography: Hideo Yamamoto
- Edited by: Yasushi Shimamura
- Music by: Kōji Endō
- Production companies: Daiei Film; Toei Video; Excellent Film
- Distributed by: Daiei Film
- Release date: November 27, 1999 (Japan)
- Running time: 105 minutes
- Country: Japan

Dead or Alive (DEAD OR ALIVE: 犯罪者, Deddo oa araibu: Hanzaisha, Lit. "Dead or Alive: Criminals"), abbreviated as DOA (Dii ō ei), is a 1999 Japanese yakuza action film directed by Takashi Miike.

It stars Riki Takeuchi as the gang boss and former yakuza Ryūichi and Show Aikawa as the Japanese cop Detective Jojima and focuses on their meeting and conflict. It is the first in a loosely-connected three-part series, followed by Dead or Alive 2: Birds in 2000 and Dead or Alive: Final in 2002.

== Plot ==
Ryūichi is the leader of a small group of nikkei gangsters operating in the Shinjuku ward of Tokyo, made up of his childhood friends Satake, Mariko, Hoshiyama and Hitoshi. They rob a truck carrying money out of a business run by Aoki, a local yakuza boss who is in the middle of negotiating a territory deal with a triad gang led by Mr. Chen. Humiliated by the public loss of money at the hands of petty crooks, Aoki turns to Detective Jojima of the Tokyo Metropolitan Police, instructing him to find the culprits of the robbery and turn them over to him. Jojima is heavily indebted to Aoki since he and his wife borrowed money to pay for a life-saving surgery for their daughter.

Ryūichi picks up his younger brother, Toji, from the airport. Toji had been studying in the United States and has returned home while on spring break. Ryūichi and his gang party to celebrate Toji's return, but the mood is soured when Toji learns that Ryūichi has been paying for his studies by committing robberies. The mood is further soured when Ryūichi discovers that gang member Hitoshi has betrayed them and stolen a large part of the money from the heist. The gang tracks down Hitoshi to his mother's house and, despite Toji's pleas, Hitoshi is executed. After the murder, Toji does not want to see Ryūichi ever again.

Detective Jojima and his partner, Detective Inoue, start investigating the robbery and discover leads that point to Ryūichi and his crew. They travel to Ryūichi's hometown and find information on each of the gang's members. They also discover Hitoshi's death. They bring Ryūichi in for questioning and try to talk him into confessing, since otherwise he will have to go up against the yakuza. Despite the threat, Ryūichi refuses to confess. In turn, Jojima tells Aoki that Ryūichi was behind the robbery.

In order to find out what Aoki is planning, Mariko spies on him while he visits the brothel where she works as her day job. However, Aoki realizes who she is, drugs her, rapes her and then drowns her in a pool filled with feces. In retaliation, Ryūichi turns to the leader of one of Aoki's rival yakuza clans and offers to assassinate Aoki in exchange for the guns to do so.

During a celebration of the new partnership between Aoki's yakuza and Chen's triad, Ryūichi, Satake and Hoshiyama make their move and attack all those gathered. Ryūichi is almost killed by Chen, but he is saved by Toji, who had followed him to try to stop him from going forward with the hit. Detective Inoue arrives during the massacre after getting a tip from an informant, and tries to arrest the nikkei gang. Inoue is shot and killed by Ryūichi, but not before he accidentally kills Toji. Distraught over his brother's death, Ryūichi flees in anguish, not realizing that Aoki has survived. Detective Jojima is the first officer on the scene after the battle is over, where he finds a dead Inoue and a cowering but still alive Aoki. After Aoki brags about how much money he will make now that he does not have to share territory with the triads, Jojima kills him.

Jojima delivers the bad news to Inoue's wife and child, who decide to leave Tokyo in fear of further violence. Jojima decides to send his own wife and daughter away as well, giving them his car so they can go stay with his mother in the countryside. Unfortunately, Ryūichi had set up a bomb in the car to try to kill Jojima, but it accidentally kills his family instead.

After burying his wife and daughter, Jojima tracks down what remains of the nikkei gang as they prepare to leave the country for Taiwan. He runs their car off the road as they head towards the Tokyo docks and attacks them. Hoshiyama blows himself up with a grenade while trying to kill Jojima, but the detective survives and guns down Satake. Ryūichi and Jojima have a final stand-off where they both shoot each other repeatedly in the chest, but inexplicably neither one dies. Jojima draws a rocket launcher and Ryūichi produces a fireball from his chest and both attack each other with their new, supernatural weapons. The resulting explosion destroys the entire planet Earth.

== Cast ==
- Riki Takeuchi - Ryūichi
- Show Aikawa - Detective Jojima
- Renji Ishibashi - Aoki
- Susumu Terajima - Detective Inoue
- Hitoshi Ozawa - Satake
- Ryuushi Mizukami - Hoshiyama
- Shingo Tsurumi - Chen
- Michisuke Kashiwaya - Toji
- Mizuho Koga - Mariko
- Kyosuke Yabe - Hitoshi
- Kaoru Sugita - Mrs. Jojima
- Dankan - Tanaka
- Ren Osugi - Yan
- Hirotarō Honda - Detective Okuyama
- Tomorowo Taguchi - Afro Thug
- Hua Rong Weng - Immortal Chef
- Tokitoshi Shiota - Sakurai

== Release ==
Dead or Alive was shown at the Tokyo International Film Festival in 1999. The film received a theatrical release in Japan on November 27 the same year.

== Reception ==
A review in Sight & Sound found that the film "demonstrates enough flair and grotesque wit to make for very enjoyable viewing", with an ending that "demolishes any vestiges of genre credibility".

== Aftermath and influence ==
The Dead or Alive films are not connected in any apparent way except by director Takashi Miike and stars Riki Takeuchi and Show Aikawa. In the first film, they play yakuza and cop, respectively. Dead or Alive is notable for Takashi Miike's characteristic scenes of ultra-violence and perversity, which come casually littered throughout.

== See also ==
- List of action films of the 1990s
- List of Japanese films of 1999
