= Isako Washio =

Japanese actress

- Born: April 1, 1967 (age 58); Niigata, Japan
- Occupation: Actress
- Spouse: Tōru Nakamura (m. 1995)
- Children: Mio

Isako Washio (鷲尾 いさ子, Washio Isako) is a Japanese actress. She won the award for Best Actress at the 15th Yokohama Film Festival for Bloom in the Moonlight.

== Filmography ==
| Year | Title | Role | Notes |
|---|---|---|---|
| 1986 | Noyuki yamayuki umibe yuki | O-Shouchan | |
| 1990 | Kanojo ga kekkon shinai riyû | Masako Nagao | |
| 1993 | Bloom in the Moonlight | Yuki Nakano | |
| 1995 | Fist of the North Star | Julia | |
| 1996 | Ignatius | | |
| 1997 | Watashitachi ga suki datta koto | Yoko Ogino | |
| 1997 | Fukigen na kajitsu | Kiriko Okabe | |
| 1998 | Beru epokku | Shion Yamada | |
