= Tomi Taira =

Japanese actress

Tomi Taira (平良 とみ, Taira Tomi; 5 November 1928 – 6 December 2015) was a Japanese actress with a long history of performing in Okinawan theatre. She was mainly active as an actress, narrator, dialect coach and in other capacities in shows and films taking place in Okinawa and in projects otherwise representing the region, as well as working more directly and officially with the Okinawa Tourist Bureau in promoting the island prefecture.

Acting both on stage and in films for many years, her first notable role in films was that of the title role of Nabbie, the grandmother in the 1999 film Nabbie no koi.

== Life and career ==
Tomi Taira was born on 5 November 1928. At the age of thirteen, after graduating from Ishigaki Elementary School, she joined the "Ōchō Kojirō Ichiza" ("Old Man Kojirō's Troupe"), where she met her future husband, Susumu Taira. Years later, in 1956, she joined the troupe "Tokiwa-za" led by Chōshū Makishi.

Taira Tomi frequently performed alongside her husband both on stage and in films, and the two were active together in other ventures. The two founded an Okinawan theatrical troupe, "Shio" (潮, lit. "The Tide") in 1971; among his many acting roles, Susumu played Tomi's chief love interest, Sun Ra, in Nabbie no koi.

After the release of Nabbie no koi, Taira narrated and acted in a number of Japanese television dramas, including Sushi Ōji! (lit. "Prince [of] Sushi"), along with films such as Nada Sōsō and a Japanese version of A Midsummer Night's Dream, entitled Manatsu no yo no yume.

She received a number of awards over the course of her career, including being named Best Supporting Actress at the 30th Japanese Television Drama Academy Awards for her performance in the 2001 television drama Churasan, and receiving the Tokyo Sports Film Award, for which one of the chief judges was Japanese director/screenwriter/actor Takeshi Kitano. In 1998, she was officially designated by Okinawa Prefecture a Protector of Intangible Cultural Properties, Ryukyuan Song and Drama (沖縄県指定無形文化財琉球歌劇保持者). She died on 6 December 2015 at the age of 87.

== Filmography ==
=== Film ===
- Paradise View (1985)
- Umi sora sango no ii tsutae (1991)
- Nabbie no koi (1999) - Nabbie
- Hotel Hibiscus (2002)
- Nada Sōsō (2006)
- Koishikute (2007)
- Ginmaku ban Sushi Ōji!: Nyūyōku e iku ("Sushi Ōji the Movie: Sushi Ōji Goes to New York!", 2008)
- Manatsu no yo no yume (2009)

=== Television ===
- Churasan (2001) - Kohagura Hana (Grandmother, "Oba")
- Koi Seyo Otome (2002)
- Shinri bunseki sôsakan Sakiyama Tomoko (2002)
- Churasan 2 (2003)
- Motto Koi Seyo Otome (2004)
- Churasan 3 (2004)
- Churasan 4 (2007)
- Sushi Ōji (2007) - Martial arts master Purusu Riri
