= Bloom in the Moonlight =

- Film poster
- Directed by: Shinichiro Sawai
- Screenplay by: Akira Miyazaki; Ryoji Ito; Shinichiro Sawai
- Produced by: Tan Takaiwa; Seiji Urushido
- Starring: Isako Washio; Tōru Kazama; Taisaku Akino; Fumi Dan
- Cinematography: Daisaku Kimura
- Edited by: Isamu Ichida
- Music by: Masaru Sato
- Production companies: Toei Company; Nippon TV
- Distributed by: Toei Company
- Release date: August 21, 1993 (Japan)
- Running time: 125 minutes
- Country: Japan
- Language: Japanese

Bloom in the Moonlight (Japanese: わが愛の譜 滝廉太郎物語, Hepburn: Waga Ai no Uta Taki Rentarō Monogatari) is a 1993 Japanese biographical drama film directed by Shinichiro Sawai about the life of pianist Rentarō Taki.

== Cast ==
- Tōru Kazama as Rentarō Taki
- Isako Washio as Yuki Nakano
- Yuko Asano as Misako
- Hiroshi Katsuno as Daikichi Taki
- Takaaki Enoki as Tōson Shimazaki
- Kyōhei Shibata as Kōda Rohan
- Gō Katō as Yoshihiro Taki

== Awards ==
17th Japan Academy Prize

- Nominated: Best Film
- Nominated: Best Director - Shinichirō Sawai
- Nominated: Best Screenplay
- Nominated: Best Actor - Tōru Kazama
- Nominated: Best Actress - Isako Washio
- Nominated: Best Supporting Actress - Fumi Dan

15th Yokohama Film Festival

- Won: Best Actress - Isako Washio
- 5th Best Film
