= Yuji Nakae =

Japanese film director

- Born: November 16, 1960 (age 65); Kyoto, Japan
- Occupation: Film director

Yuji Nakae (中江 裕司, Nakae Yūji) is a Japanese film director who specializes in films set in Okinawa, featuring Okinawan music, language, themes and atmosphere. He shared the Directors Guild of Japan New Directors Award for his debut film, Pineapple Tours, which was an omnibus film co-directed with Tsutomu Makiya and Hayashi Tōma. He won the award for Best Director at the 25th Hochi Film Award for Nabbie's Love.

== Filmography ==
- Pineapple Tours (1992) (one short of three)
- Nabbie's Love (1999)
- Hotel Hibiscus (2002)
- Koishikute (2007)
- Manatsu no Yo no Yume, aka Okinawan Midsummer Night's Dream (2009)
- BON-UTA: A Song from Home (2019) (documentary)
- The Zen Diary (2022)
