= Murder at Mt. Fuji =

1982 Japanese novel

- First English edition
- Author: Shizuko Natsuki
- Original title: Daburyū no Higeki
- Language: Japanese
- Genre: Crime novel
- Publisher: St. Martin's Press
- Publication date: 1982
- Publication place: Japan
- English publication date: 1984
- Media type: Print (hardback & paperback)
- ISBN: 0-345-33761-1

Murder at Mt. Fuji (Wの悲劇, Daburyū no Higeki; The Tragedy of W) is a Japanese novel by author Shizuko Natsuki, originally published in 1982. It has been adapted into several Japanese television dramas and a film.

== Plot ==
"I've stabbed Grandpa to death." With these words, rich heiress Chiyo Wada incriminated herself in the murder of her grandfather, Yohei Wada, the patriarch of a rich family owning a large conglomerate. Chiyo had brought along her friend Jane Prescott to spend the New Year holidays with her family: Yohei, grandmother Mine, grand-uncle Shigeru, mother Yoshie, stepfather Sawahiko, cousin Takuo, and Dr. Shohei Mazaki, who's rumored to be an illegitimate member of the family.

When Yohei is killed, the investigation is undertaken by detectives Ukyo Nakazato and Katsubei Aiura, who have more questions than answers. Did Chiyo really murder her own grandfather, a known playboy who often groped her? Or was she set up by another family member? The answers will be decisive for the Wada family to stay together - or break apart...

=== Notes ===
- A few of the main characters had their names changed:

Name in English translation	Original Japanese name
Wada	Watsuji (和辻)
Chiyo	Mako (摩子)
Kazue	Yoshie (淑枝)
Sawahiko	Michihiko (道彦)

- Shizuko Natsuki's original title Daburyū no Higeki is a tribute to Ellery Queen's Tragedy of... novels of the 1930s, which ran from X to Z and had Drury Lane as protagonist.

== In other media ==
For the English version of the book, the Japanese character Harumi Ichijō (一条 春生, Ichijō Harumi) was replaced with the American character Jane Prescott. This character was not changed in audiovisual media adaptations, although Harumi Ichijō has varied degrees of relationship with the rich heiress Mako Watsuji (和辻 摩子, Watsuji Mako) depending on the adaptation.

=== TV drama ===
Daburyū no Higeki was made into TV dramas in 1983, 1986, 2001, 2010 and 2012. The first four iterations were miniseries lasting no more than two episodes; the last iteration lasted 8 episodes weekly, the lowest average for a typical season drama.

=== Film ===
The novel was adapted into a film in 1984, directed by Shinichiro Sawai.

== Bibliography ==
- Natsuki, Shizuko (1984). Murder at Mt. Fuji. New York: St. Martin's Press. ISBN 0312552874. OCLC 10146176.
