= Osaka Story =

- DVD cover
- Directed by: Jun Ichikawa
- Written by: Isshin Inudo
- Produced by: Tetsuo Satonaka
- Starring: Chizuru Ikewaki; Kōsuke Minamino; Kenji Sawada; Yūko Tanaka
- Cinematography: Tatsuhiko Kobayashi; Takahiro Tsutai
- Edited by: Yukio Watanabe
- Music by: Tomoyuki Asakawa
- Production companies: Kindai Eiga Kyōkai; Dentsu; Kansai Television
- Release date: 27 March 1999 (Japan)
- Running time: 120 minutes
- Country: Japan
- Language: Japanese

Osaka Story (Japanese: 大阪物語, Hepburn: Ōsaka monogatari) is a 1999 Japanese drama film directed by Jun Ichikawa and starring Chizuru Ikewaki, Kōsuke Minamino, Kenji Sawada and Yūko Tanaka. It was released on 27 March 1999.

== Cast ==
- Chizuru Ikewaki
- Kōsuke Minamino
- Kenji Sawada
- Yūko Tanaka

== Reception ==
It was chosen as the 6th best film at the 21st Yokohama Film Festival.

Award	Date	Category	Recipients and nominees	Result
Yokohama Film Festival	6 February 2000	Best Newcomer	Chizuru Ikewaki	Won
