= Darryl Chan =

American actor

- Born: San Francisco, California
- Occupation(s): Film, television actor, stunt man

Darryl M. Chan is an accomplished Hollywood stuntman, martial artist, and actor of Chinese descent. He grew up in San Francisco as the second of four boys. His career spans from the early 1980s to the present. Chan has worked with virtually all the leading Asian actors and filmmakers, and counts Brandon Lee as one of his closest friends at the time of Lee's death. Darryl is also a sports medicine specialist, and has trained many of the entertainment industry's actors and musicians to prepare for roles and world tours.

== Stunt Work ==
- The Girl from the Naked Eye (2008) (post-production) (stunts)
- Heroes (stunt double) (4 episodes, 2006–2007) (stunt performer) (3 episodes, 2007)

The Line (2007) TV episode (stunt performer)
Four Months Later... (2007) TV episode (stunt performer) (uncredited)
How to Stop an Exploding Man (2007) TV episode (stunt performer)
Unexpected (2007) TV episode (stunt double)
Hiros (2006) TV episode (stunt double) (2 more)

- Pushing Daisies (stunt double) (1 episode, 2007)

The Fun in Funeral (2007) TV episode (stunt double) (uncredited)

- Chuck (stunt performer) (1 episode, 2007)

Chuck Versus the Tango (2007) TV episode (stunt performer)

- Balls of Fury (2007) (stunt fighter)
- Rush Hour 3 (2007) (stunts)
- Pirates of the Caribbean: At World's End (2007) (stunt performer)

... aka P.O.T.C. 3 (USA: promotional abbreviation)
... aka Pirates 3 (USA: informal short title)

- 24 (stunt performer) (3 episodes, 2007)

Day 6: 3:00 a.m.-4:00 a.m. (2007) TV episode (stunt performer)
Day 6: 2:00 a.m.-3:00 a.m. (2007) TV episode (stunt performer)
Day 6: 6:00 a.m.-7:00 a.m. (2007) TV episode (stunt performer)

- Watch Over Me (stunts) (1 episode, 2006)

Appearances (2006) TV episode (stunts)

- The Unit (utility stunts) (1 episode, 2006)

Silver Star (2006) TV episode (utility stunts)

- Pirates of the Caribbean: Dead Man's Chest (2006) (stunt performer) (uncredited)

... aka P.O.T.C. 2 (USA: promotional abbreviation)
... aka Pirates 2 (USA: informal short title)

- Alias (stunt double: horse stunts) (1 episode, 2006)

I See Dead People (2006) TV episode (stunt double: horse stunts) (uncredited)

- Heroes" (stunt double) (1 episode, 2006)

Episode #1.1 (2006) TV episode (stunt double)

- Rent (2005) (stunt actor) (uncredited)
- Last Mountain (2005) (stunt double: horse stunts)
- Collateral (2004) (stunts)
- Forbidden Warrior (2004) (stunt actor)
- Biker Boyz (2003) (stunts)
- Monk (stunts) (1 episode, 2002)

Mr. Monk and the Candidate: Part 1 (2002) TV episode (stunts)

- V.I.P." (stunts) (3 episodes, 1999-2001) (stunt performer) (unknown episodes)

... aka V.I.P. - Die Bodyguards (Germany)
Crouching Tiger, Hidden Val (2001) TV episode (stunts)
Magnificent Val (2000) TV episode (stunts)
Mao Better Blues (1999) TV episode (stunts)

- Planet of the Apes (2001) (stunt double: horse stunts)
- Nash Bridges (stunts) (9 episodes, 1996-2001) (stunts: multiple episodes) (unknown episodes)

... aka Bridges
Bear Trap (2001) TV episode (stunts)
Warplay (1998) TV episode (stunts)
Live Shot (1998) TV episode (stunts)
Wild Card (1997) TV episode (stunts)
Rampage (1997) TV episode (stunts) (4 more)

- Paper Bullets (2000) (stunts)

... aka American Samurai (UK)

- Chain of Command (2000) (stunts)
- Stageghost (2000) (stunt rider)

... aka Stage Ghost (USA: video box title)

- Martial Law" (stunt performer) (7 episodes, 1998–1999)

Call of the Wild (1999) TV episode (stunt performer)
This Shogun for Hire (1999) TV episode (stunt performer)
Requiem (1999) TV episode (stunt performer)
Breakout (1999) TV episode (stunt performer)
Wild Life (1999) TV episode (stunt performer) (2 more)

- Bowfinger (1999) (stunts) (uncredited)
- Mystery Men (1999) (stunts)
- The 13th Warrior (1999) (stunt fighter)

... aka The Thirteenth Warrior

- Air America (stunts) (2 episodes, 1998)

The Hit (1998) TV episode (stunts) (multiple episodes)
Abduction (1998) TV episode (stunts) (multiple episodes)

- Rush Hour (1998) (stunts)
- Lethal Weapon 4 (1998) (stunts) (uncredited)

... aka Lethal 4 (USA: promotional abbreviation)

- The Magnificent Seven (1998) TV series (stunts) (unknown episodes)
- Pensacola: Wings of Gold (1997) TV series (stunt performer) (unknown episodes)
- Red Corner (1997) (stunts)
- Buffy the Vampire Slayer (stunt performer) (1 episode, 1997)

... aka BtVS (USA: promotional abbreviation)
... aka Buffy
... aka Buffy the Vampire Slayer: The Series
Angel (1997) TV episode (stunt performer)

- Beverly Hills Ninja (1997) (stunt actor)
- Total Force (1997) (stunt actor)
- White Cargo (1996) (stunts)
- Theodore Rex (1995) (V) (stunt double)

... aka T. Rex

- Kuang qing sha shou (1995) (stunts)

... aka Dragon Killer

- Batman Forever (1995) (stunts) (uncredited)
- Fist of the North Star (1995) (stunt actor)

... aka Hokuto no Ken

- Hard Justice (1995) (V) (stunts)
- Mortal Kombat: The Journey Begins (1995) (V) (assistant stunt coordinator) (stunt actor)
- Deadly Target (1994/I) (stunts)

... aka Fire Zone

- Blue Tiger (1994) (stunts)

... aka Irezumi (Japan)

- Vanishing Son (1994) (TV) (stunts: multiple episodes) (as Darryl M. Chan)
- Pointman (1994) (TV) (stunt actor)
- American Yakuza (1993) (stunts)
- Harts of the West (1993) TV series (stunts) (unknown episodes)
- Dragon: The Bruce Lee Story (1993) (stunt double)
- Walker, Texas Ranger (stunts) (1 episode, 1993)

... aka Walker (Australia)
A Shadow in the Night (1993) TV episode (stunts)

- Best of the Best 2 (1993) (stunt double)
- Rapid Fire (1992) (stunts)
- Showdown in Little Tokyo (1991) (stunts)
- Double Impact (1991) (stunts)
- Tour of Duty (1987) TV series (stunts) (unknown episodes)

== Acting Roles ==
- Heroes ... Fake Kensei / ... (2 episodes, 2007)

The Line (2007) TV episode .... White Beard's Guard
Four Months Later... (2007) TV episode (uncredited) .... Fake Kensei

- Balls of Fury (2007) ... Feng's Bodyguard
- Watch Over Me ... Man in Black #2 (1 episode, 2006)

Appearances (2006) TV episode .... Man in Black #2

- Rent (2005) ... Thug
- She Spies ... Chang (1 episode, 2003)

Rane of Terror (2003) TV episode .... Chang

- Robbery Homicide Division ... Man (1 episode, 2003)

... aka R.H.D./LA: Robbery Homicide Division/Los Angeles (USA: complete title)
Absolute Perfection (2003) TV episode .... Man

- V.I.P. ... Chung (1 episode, 2001)

... aka V.I.P. - Die Bodyguards (Germany)
Crouching Tiger, Hidden Val (2001) TV episode .... Chung

- Knight Club (2001) ... Bouncer
- Stageghost (2000) ... Appaloosa Indian

... aka Stage Ghost (USA: video box title)

- Jade (1995) ... Tommy Joy
- Fist of the North Star (1995) ... Novak

... aka Hokuto no Ken

- The Shadow (1994) ... Mongol
- Leather Jackets (1992) ... Su
- Missing Pieces (1991) ... Young Chinese Man

== Trainer credits ==
- Heroes (personal trainer: james kyson lee) (16 episodes, 2006–2007)

Parasite (2007) TV episode (personal trainer: James Kyson Lee) (uncredited)
Company Man (2007) TV episode (personal trainer: James Kyson Lee) (uncredited)
Unexpected (2007) TV episode (personal trainer: James Kyson Lee) (uncredited)
Run! (2007) TV episode (personal trainer: James Kyson Lee) (uncredited)
Distractions (2007) TV episode (personal trainer: James Kyson Lee) (uncredited) (11 more)

- The Dead Zone (2002) (V) (personal trainer: Anthony Michael Hall)
- Lone Hero (2002) (personal trainer: Lou Diamond Phillips)

... aka Héros solitaire (Canada: French title)

- Band of Brothers (2001) (mini) TV mini-series (gym trainer: Ron Livingston)
- Knight Club (2001) (on-set trainer: Lou Diamond Phillips)
- Supernova (2000/I) (on-set trainer: Lou Diamond Phillips)
- Office Space (1999) (gym trainer: Ron Livingston) (uncredited)

... aka Cubiculos de la oficina (USA: Spanish title)

- Martial Law (1998) TV series (trainer: tzi ma) (unknown episodes)
- The Big Hit (1998) (trainer: Lou Diamond Phillips)
- Metro (1997) (personal trainer: Michael Wincott)
- Courage Under Fire (1996) (on-set trainer: Lou Diamond Phillips) (uncredited)
- Mortal Kombat: The Journey Begins (1995) (V) (motion capture actor: Shang Tsung, Sub-Zero, Duroc)
- The Crow (1994) (on set trainer: Brandon Lee)
- Cage II (1994) (trainer: Shannon Lee)

... aka Cage II: The Arena of Death

- Rapid Fire (1992) (trainer: Brandon Lee) (as Darryl M. Chan)
- Missing Pieces (1991) (personal trainer: Lauren Hutton)
- Kill Squad (1982) (assistant martial arts coordinator) (as Darryl M. Chan)

... aka Code of Honor
