= Fumi Dan =

Japanese actress (born 1954)

- Born: June 5, 1954 (age 72); Nerima, Tokyo, Japan
- Occupation: Actress
- Years active: 1972–present
- Height: 1.70 m (5 ft 7 in)

Fumi Dan (檀ふみ, Dan Fumi) (born June 5, 1954) is a Japanese actress. She was nominated for Best Supporting Actress at the 17th Japan Academy Prize for her role in Bloom in the Moonlight. Her father is the novelist Kazuo Dan and she herself has won awards for her essays.

== Filmography ==
=== Film ===
- Brutal Tales of Chivalry 9 (1972) – Oyuki
- Tora's Pure Love (1976) – Masako Yagyū
- House (1977) – Teacher
- Ashita no Joe (1980) (voice) – Yōko Shiraki
- Ashita no Joe 2 (1981) (voice) – Yōko Shiraki
- House on Fire (1986) – Kazuo's mother
- Tora-san, My Uncle (1989) – Hisako Okumura
- Bloom in the Moonlight (1993) – Nobu Kōda
- Farewell to Nostradamus (1996) (voice) – Mary Douglas
- After the Rain (1999) – Nobleman's wife
- Kamachi (2004) – Yōko Kanno
- Climbing to Spring (2014) – Sumire Nagamine
- Leaving the Scene (2019) – Chizuko
- The Zen Diary (2022) – Fumiko
- Sun and Bolero (2022) – Yoriko Hanamura

=== Television ===
- Yasashii Jidai (1978) – Yōko Matsui
- Haru no Hatō (1985) – Fusako Fukuzawa
- Hana no Ran (1994) – Mori
- Hana Moyu (2015) – Sugi Taki
- Toto Neechan (2016) – Narrator
- Rikuoh (2017) – Mieko Miyazawa

=== Dubbing ===
- Watership Down – Hyzenthlay

== Awards ==
| Year | Award | Category | Work(s) | Result | Ref |
|---|---|---|---|---|---|
| 1975 | Elan d'or Awards | Newcomer of the Year | Herself | Won | |
