= Churasan =

Japanese television drama series

- Also known as: ちゅらさん
- Genre: Drama
- Written by: Yoshikazu Okada
- Starring: Ryoko Kuninaka; Kenji Kohashi; Kyoko Maya; Hiroshi Katsuno; Tomi Taira; Gori; Takayuki Yamada; Shinobu Miyara; Eri Maehara; Hiroki Kawata; Hayato Fujiki; Manami Konishi; Yatsuko Tanami; Takehiro Murata; Miho Kanno; Keiko Toda; Kimiko Yo; Kazuo Kitamura; Yoshiko Tanaka; Masaaki Sakai
- Narrated by: Tomi Taira
- Opening theme: "Best Friend" by Kiroro
- Country of origin: Japan
- Original language: Japanese
- No. of seasons: 1
- No. of episodes: 5

Production
- Producer: Yasuhiro Kan
- Running time: 15 minutes
- Production company: NHK

Original release
- Network: NHK
- Release: April 2 – September 29, 2001

Churasan (ちゅらさん), is a Japanese television drama series and the 64th Asadora series. It was broadcast on NHK from April 2 to September 29, 2001.

The screenplay was written by Yoshikazu Okada. It was the first Asadora to be set in Okinawa Prefecture (Kohama Island). It was also the first Asadora of the 21st century.

== Plot ==
Kohagura Eri is born on the day of Okinawa's reversion to the Japanese on Kohama Island, Okinawa Prefecture. When she is 11 years old, the Uemura family visits the Kohagura family-run guesthouse (Minshuku) "Kohagura-So" from Tokyo. Eri becomes friends with brothers Kazuya and Fumiya, however Kazuya ends up dying from a terminal illness. A few days later, when the Uemura family leaves the island, Eri gives Fumiya a Minsah-ori, Fumiya gives Eri a Super ball, and they promise to get married in the future.

Seven years later, her older brother Keisho appears at the Kohagura household and tries to convince the family to manufacture a "Goya-man" action figure he designed. The family tries desperately to advertise it, but only manages to sell it to some relatives, following which Keisho disappears again. During this time, Eri is studying for college entrance exams to attend college in Tokyo. With the help of Ikehata Yoko, an office lady working at a travel agency, she visits Tokyo to take the exam. When there she stops by Fumiya's address and realizes that he's moved somewhere else. At this same time on Kohama Island, Fumiya is visiting to pay respects to his brother who is buried there when he meets Eri's grandmother. He returns to Tokyo without meeting Eri, although that night, Eri feels convinced she crossed paths with Fumiya in Tokyo. After Eri returns to Okinawa, she becomes excited when hearing the news about Fumiya's visit, but is later saddened by the news that she failed the university entrance exam. Nevertheless, she remains committed to moving to Tokyo. Despite her family's reticence, they ultimately allow her to leave.

In Tokyo, Eri begins living at the "Ippūkan" apartment building. She also begins working at the "Yugafu" Okinawan restaurant, where she introduces a lunch service where she serves dishes taught to her by her grandmother and mother. Business is going well, but when she realizes the owner is unhappy about regular customers no longer visiting the restaurant, she ultimately calls off the lunch service. At Ippūkan, one of the elderly tenants, Shimada Daishin, falls down and is admitted to the hospital, and Eri works hard to take care of him. After speaking with one of the hospital nurses, she decides to pursue nursing as a career. Additionally, she meets Fumiya again at the hospital, and is shocked by the fact that he remembers her as is first love. She ultimately passes the university entrance exams and moves out of Ippūkan and into a student dormitory.

After graduation, she begins working at the hospital where Fumiya is doing his residency. She begins opening up with him, but becomes aware of another girl, Nishinomiya Haruka, who is also interested in Fumiya. They all begin working in the internal medicine department together. Eri confesses her love to Fumiya, but he does not respond. Dejected, Eri visits Kohama Island, and Fumiya, remembering his promise to his brother, catches up to her there and proposes.

Between their busy schedules, they hold weddings in both Tokyo and Okinawa and begin their married life in Ippūkan. Eri becomes pregnant, and returns to Okinawa to give birth at home. They name the child Kazuya, after Fumiya's brother. Fumiya is then transferred from internal medicine to surgery.

When Kazuya is 4 years old, they notice him stop talking with strangers, and he is ultimately diagnosed with elective mutism. Eri and Fumiya are worried because they don't know the cause. Eri begins feeling stomach pain, and is examined by Haruka, who diagnoses her with a malignant tumor. Eri keeps this a secret from those around her and returns to Kohama Island. While out with Kazuya, she collapses from stomach pain. Kazuya has a vision where he is led by Kijimuna, traditional Okinawan spirits, and overcoming his condition calls for help. Eri is transferred to a hospital in Tokyo and successfully undergoes surgery performed by Fumiya.

After Eri recovers, the three of them decide to live on Kohama Island. Fumiya joins a clinic, and Eri begins working as a public health nurse. At "Kohagura-so", they invite the Kohagura family and friends from Tokyo for a party, and the series ends with Eri living a happy life with her family.

== Cast ==
=== Kohagura family ===
- Ryoko Kuninaka as Kohagura Eri
- Tomi Taira as Kohagura Hana
- Masaaki Sakai as Kohagura Keibun
- Yoshiko Tanaka as Kohagura Katsuko
- Gori as Kohagura Keisho
- Takayuki Yamada as Kohagura Keitatsu

=== Uemura family ===
- Kenji Kohashi as Uemura Fumiya
- Yuuya Endo as Uemura Kazuya
- Hiroshi Katsuno as Uemura Nobuo
- Kyoko Maya as Uemura Shizuko
- Shogo Suzuki as Uemura Kazuya

=== Ippūkan people ===
- Yatsuko Tan'ami as Mizue Kirino
- Kimiko Yo as Yoko Ikehata
- Takehiro Murata as Kozo Shibata
- Kazuo Kitamura as Daishin Shimada
- Miho Kanno Maria Jonouchi

== See also ==
- Churasan 3

Preceded by Ōdorī	Churasan; April 2, 2001 – September 29, 2001	Succeeded by Honmamon
