= Riki Takeuchi =

Japanese actor (born 1964)

- 竹内 力
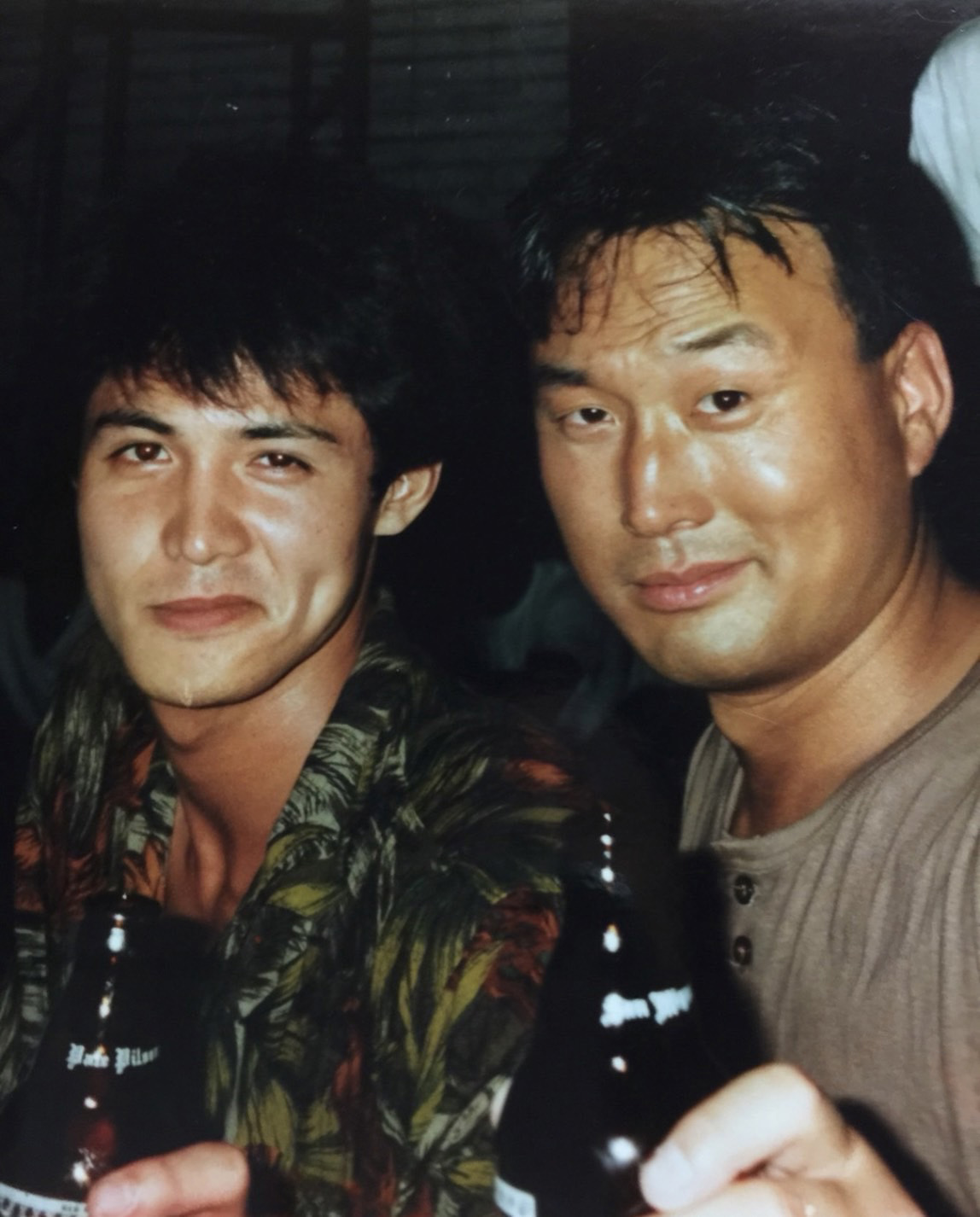
- Riki Takeuchi (left) and Junichi Matsushita on the set of Blowback 2: Gangs of the Sunset (1991)
- Born: January 4, 1964 (age 62); Saiki, Ōita Prefecture, Japan
- Occupation: Actor
- Years active: 1985–present
- Website: rikitakeuchi.com

Riki Takeuchi (Japanese: 竹内 力, Hepburn: Takeuchi Riki; born January 4, 1964) is a Japanese actor best known for his roles in v-cinema yakuza movies.

Takeuchi has starred in many yakuza films and action films, such as Dead or Alive by Takashi Miike. Takeuchi also starred in Battle Royale II: Requiem, in which he played a fictionalized version of himself.

Takeuchi had also a short stint at the end of the professional wrestling promotion Hustle in 2009, posing as a villainous character based on himself called "King RIKI". The same year, Takeuchi recorded with Avex Group a version of Morning Musume's "Love Machine" for the song's tenth anniversary, appearing under his RIKI persona along with wrestlers Riki Choshu and Yoshihiro Takayama.

== Selected filmography ==
=== Films ===
- His Motorbike, Her Island (1985)
- Yakuza Wives (1986) as Taichi Hanata
- The King of Minami (1992‍–‍2009) as Ginjirô Manda
- Tokyo Mafia: Yakuza Wars (1995) as Ginya Yabuki
- Tokyo Mafia: Wrath of the Yakuza (1995) as Ginya Yabuki
- Peanuts (1996)
- Fudoh: The New Generation (1996) as Daigen Nohma
- Tokyo Mafia: Battle For Shinjuku (1996) as Ginya Yabuki
- Tokyo Mafia: Yakuza Blood (1997) as Ginya Yabuki
- Blood (1998)
- The Yakuza Way (1998) as Kanuma
- Dead or Alive (1999) as Ryuuichi
- Nobody as Nanbu (1999)
- Dead or Alive 2: Birds (2000) as Shuuichi Sawada
- Dead or Alive: Final (2002) as Officer Takeshi Honda
- Deadly Outlaw: Rekka (2002) as Kunisada
- Mafia Family Yanagawa (2002)
- Mafia Family Yanagawa 2 (2002)
- Battle Royale II: Requiem (2003) as himself
- Last Life in the Universe (2003) as Takashi
- Yakuza Demon (2003) as Seiji
- Arashi no Yoru Ni (2005) as the voice of Giro
- Yo-Yo Girl Cop (2006) as Kazutoshi Kira
- Elite Yankee Saburo (2009) as Tokujirō Kunō
- Thermae Romae (2012) – Tateno
- Thermae Romae II (2014) – Tateno
- Tokyo Tribe (2014) as Buppa
- Real Girl (2018)
- My Father's Tracks (2021)

=== Television ===
- Kuroshoin no Rokubei (2018) as Saigō Takamori

=== Video games ===
- Yakuza 0 (2015) as Hiroki Awano
- Ryū ga Gotoku Ishin! (2023) as Takeda Kanryusai

=== Japanese dub ===
- Mad Max: Fury Road (2015) as Immortan Joe (Hugh Keays-Byrne)
- Kingdom of the Planet of the Apes (2024) as Proximus Caesar (Kevin Durand)
