= Chizuru Ikewaki =

Japanese actress (born 1981)

- Born: November 21, 1981 (age 44); Higashiosaka, Osaka, Japan
- Occupation: Actress
- Years active: 1997–present

Chizuru Ikewaki (池脇 千鶴, Ikewaki Chizuru; born 21 November 1981 in Higashiosaka, Osaka) is a Japanese actress.

== Career ==
Ikewaki was given a Best New Talent award at the 2000 Yokohama Film Festival for her performance in Osaka Story. She appeared in Kiyoshi Kurosawa's 2012 television drama Penance. She has also appeared in films such as Sword of Desperation and Looking for a True Fiancee.

== Filmography ==
=== Film ===
Year	Title	Role	Notes	Ref.
1999	Osaka Story	Wakana	Lead role	
2000	Across a Gold Prairie	Narisu Kodai	Lead role	
2002	The Cat Returns	Haru (voice)	Lead role	
2003	Josee, the Tiger and the Fish	Josee	Lead role	
2003	A Day on the Planet	Chiyo		
2006	Strawberry Shortcakes	Satoko	Lead role	
2008	The Homeless Student			
2008	10 Promises to My Dog	Yuko Inoue		
2009	Pandemic			
2010	Sweet Little Lies			
2010	Sword of Desperation	Rio		
2010	Permanent Nobara			
2011	Bunny Drop	Yuki Goto		
2011	In His Chart			
2011	Looking for a True Fiancee	Wakako Suzuki		
2012	Hasami	Hisae Nagai	Lead role	
2013	Under the Nagasaki Sky			
2013	Don't Lose Heart - Kujikenaide			
2013	The Great Passage			
2013	The Devil's Path	Yoko Fujii		
2013	Beyond the Memories	Manami		
2014	The Light Shines Only There	Chinatsu Ohshiro		
2014	In His Chart 2			
2014	Princess Jellyfish	Banba		
2015	Being Good	Yōko Ōmiya		
2016	Rage	Asuka		
2018	Lenses on Her Heart	Akane Ōtaki	Lead role	
2018	Shoplifters	Kie Miyabe		
2018	Ten Years Japan		Lead role; "Sono Kūki wa Mienai" segment	
2019	Tora-san, Wish You Were Here	Setsuko Takano		
2019	Another World	Hatsuno		
2022	My Small Land	Noriko Sakiyama		
2025	Sunset Sunrise	Hitomi Mochida		
2026	Rhapsody, Rhapsody			

=== Television ===
Year	Title	Role	Notes	Ref.
1998	Tokugawa Yoshinobu	Sakura	Taiga drama	
2000	Summer Snow	Chika Shinoda		
2001–02	Honmamon	Konoha	Lead role; Asadora	
2002	Season of the Sun	Eiko Izumi		
2003	Ōoku	Maru		
2007	Fūrin Kazan	Lady Sanjō	Taiga drama	
2012	Penance	Yuka Ogawa		
2018	Jimmy: The True Story of a True Idiot	Shinobu Otake		
2021	Old Jack and Rose	Arata Usui	Lead role	
2025–26	The Ghost Writer's Wife	Fumi Matsuno	Asadora	
