= Shinichiro Sawai =

Japanese film director and screenwriter (1938–2021)

Shinichiro Sawai 澤井 信一郎
- Born: 16 August 1938; Hamamatsu, Japan
- Died: 3 September 2021 (aged 83); Tokyo, Japan
- Occupation: Filmmaker

Shinichiro Sawai (澤井 信一郎, Sawai Shin'ichirō; 16 August 1938 – 3 September 2021) was a Japanese film director and screenwriter.

== Career ==
Born in Hamamatsu, Sawai studied German at Tokyo University of Foreign Studies. Graduating in 1961, he joined the Toei Company as an assistant director and worked under such directors as Masahiro Makino and Norifumi Suzuki. He also collaborated on scripts such as those for the Truck Yarō series. He made his debut as a director in 1981 with Nogiku no haka, a vehicle for the idol singer Seiko Matsuda.

He won the Directors Guild of Japan New Directors Award in 1985, and the Japan Academy Prize for Director of the Year in 1986.

== Filmography ==
- The Wild Daisy, aka Nogiku no haka (1981)
- W's Tragedy (1984)
- Early Spring Story (1985)
- Maison Ikkoku: Apartment Fantasy (1986)
- Lovers' Time, aka Koibitotachino jikoku (1987)
- Memories of You, aka Rabu sutori o kimini (1988)
- Fukuzawa Yukichi (1991)
- Bloom in the Moonlight (1993)
- A Brief Message from the Heart (1995)
- Diary of Early Winter Shower (1998)
- The Story of Dan the Puppy (2002)
- Seventeen, aka 17sai Tabidachi no Futari (2003)
- Genghis Khan: To the Ends of the Earth and Sea (2007)

== Television credits ==
Asterisk = Series director

- Daigekito Mad Police '80 (1980)
- G-Men '75 (1982)
- Getsuyo Wide Gekijo (1982)
- Space Sheriff Shaider (1984–1985)*
- Juukou B-Fighter (1995–1996)*
- Shogun no Onmitsu! Kage Juhachi (1996)
- Keijo! (1996)
- Non X (1996)
- Gamotei Jiken (1998)

== Bibliography ==
- Sawai, Shin'ichirō; Hitoshi Suzuki (2006). Eiga no kokyū: Sawai Shinʼichirō no kantoku sahō. Tokyo: Waizu Shuppan. ISBN 978-4-89830-202-6.
