= Nabbie's Love =

- Soundtrack cover art
- Directed by: Yuji Nakae
- Written by: Yuji Nakae
- Produced by: Hiroshi Ishiya
- Starring: Naomi Nishida; Jun Murakami; Tomi Taira; Reiko Kaneshima; Rinshō Kadekaru; Misako Ôshiro; Ashley MacIsaac; Satoe Uza
- Cinematography: Kenji Takama
- Edited by: Ryūji Miyajima
- Music by: Kenichiro Isoda; Michael Nyman
- Distributed by: Office Shirous
- Release date: December 4, 1999 (Japan)
- Running time: 92 minutes
- Country: Japan
- Language: Japanese

Nabbie's Love (Japanese: ナビィの恋, Hepburn: Nabi no koi) is a Japanese film written and directed by Yuji Nakae, released in 1999. The story follows the character of Nanako (Naomi Nishida), who quits her job in Tokyo to return home to Okinawa. The film is set on Aguni Island, where Nanako visits her grandmother, Nabbie Agarikinjo, played by Tomi Taira.

The film score is by Kenichiro Isoda, with two tracks by Michael Nyman, working separately. The film tied with Rituparno Ghosh's Bariwali for the Netpac Award at the Berlin International Film Festival. Director Nakae won Best Director at the Japanese Professional Movie Awards, which also presented a Special Award to producer Shirō Sasaki. Naomi Nishida won the Hochi Film Award for Best Supporting Actress for the role of Nanako. Isoda won Best Film Score at Mainichi Film Concours. Nishida also won Best Supporting Actress at the Yokohama Film Festival, and Jun Murakami (as Fukunosuke, as well as for roles in two other films) tied for Best Supporting actor with Teruyuki Kagawa.

== Cast ==
- Naomi Nishida
- Jun Murakami
- Tomi Taira
- Reiko Kaneshima
- Rinshō Kadekaru
- Misako Ôshiro
- Ashley MacIsaac
- Satoe Uza

== Music ==
Nabbie's Love

Soundtrack album by Various Artists
- Released: November 26, 1999
- Genre: Soundtrack
- Label: BMG

Michael Nyman chronology
The Commissar Vanishes (1999)	Nabbie's Love (1999)	The End of the Affair (1999)

The film's music is an eclectic mix of Japanese, English, and Irish influences.
