= Kentarō Ōtani =

Japanese film director (born 1965)

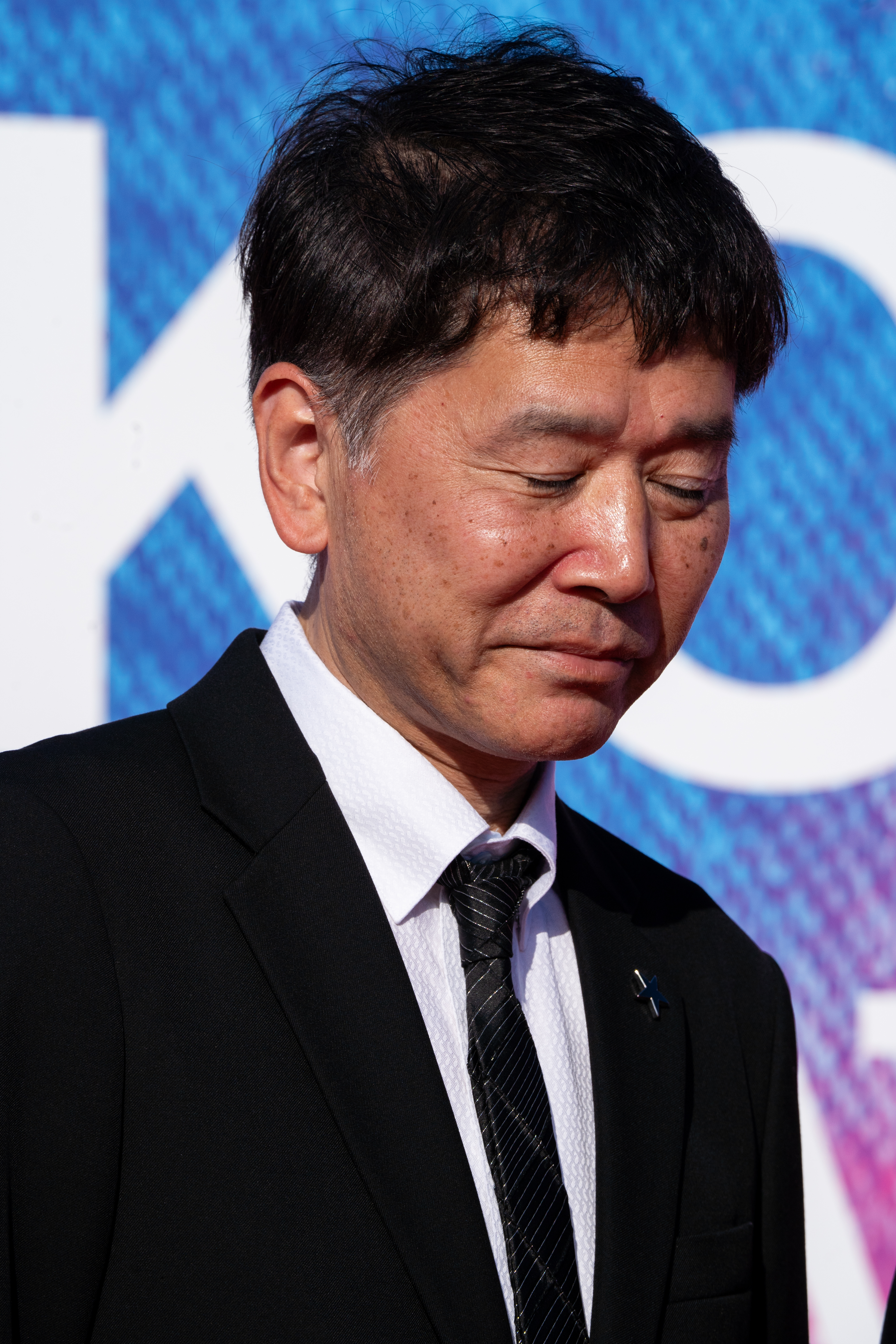
- Born: 1965 (age 60–61); Kyoto Prefecture, Japan
- Occupation: Film director

Kentarō Ōtani (大谷健太郎, Ōtani Kentarō; born 1965 in Kyoto Prefecture, Japan) is a Japanese film director.

== Filmography ==
- Avec mon mari (1999)
- Travail (2002)
- Nana (2005)
- Rough (2006)
- Nana 2 (2006)
- Runway Beat (2011)
- Black Butler (2014)
- If My Favorite Pop Idol Made It to the Budokan, I Would Die (2023, TV)
- Tea for Three (2024)
