= Takami Itō =

Japanese writer (born 1971)

Takami Itō (伊藤 たかみ, Itō Takami; born April 5, 1971) is a Japanese author who won an Akutagawa Prize in 2006.

== Biography ==
Itō was born in Kobe, Hyōgo Prefecture, Japan. As a middle-school student, he was a classmate of Ken Hirai. He later graduated from Waseda University.

== Prizes ==
- Bungei Prize (1995)
- Shōgakukan Children's Publications Culture Prize (2000)
- Jōji Hirata Literature Prize
- Akutagawa Prize (2006) for the novel "八月の路上に捨てる" (Hachigatsu no rojō ni suteru - literally means "Desert on the August road")
