= Tsugumi (actress) =

Japanese actress and model (born 1976)

- 大竹 都々美 つぐみ
- Born: Otake Tsuzumi; February 21, 1976 (age 49); Tokyo, Japan
- Occupations: Actress; model; adult video performer
- Years active: 1997–2013
- Notable work: Noriko's Dinner Table (2005)

Tsugumi (Japanese: つぐみ, Hepburn: Tsugumi), born Otake Tsuzumi (大竹 都々美, Otake Tsuzumi) on 21 February 1976, is a Japanese award-winning actress, model and adult video performer.

== Biography ==
=== Life and career ===
Born in Tokyo, after graduating from high school she started working as race queen. Tsugumi made her film debut in Time Leap (1997), a film adaptation of the manga with the same name, then started widely appearing in films, V-Cinema releases, stage plays and TV-dramas. For her role in Moonlight Whispers (1999) she was awarded as Best Newcomer Actress at the 9th Japanese Professional Movie Awards and as Best New Talent at the 21st Yokohama Film Festival.

In 2007, she left her agency and took a break from show business, taking up a job as a company employee.

In 2010 Tsugumi announced her adult video debut with Muteki, a label specialized in casting celebrities in their adult video debut.

== Filmography ==
=== Selected filmography ===
- Time Leap (1997), by Imazeki Akemi
- Be-Bop High School (TV, 1997-1998), by Yusuke Narita
- Moonlight Whispers (1999), by Akihiko Shiota
- Hush! (2001), by Ryōsuke Hashiguchi
- Luxurious Bone (2001), by Isao Yukisada
- New Shadow Warriors (2003), by Sonny Chiba
- Norio's room (2004), by Yoshihiro Fukagawa
- Kono Yo no Sotoe - Club Shinchugun (2004), by Junji Sakamoto
- AKA-SEN (2004), by Junji Sakamoto
- Noriko's Dinner Table (2006), by Sion Sono
- Freesia (2007), by Kazuyoshi Kumakiri
- Sleeping Beauty (2007), by Naoki Yamamoto
- Exte (2007), by Sion Sono

=== Adult video ===
- Actress (2010, AV, MUTEKI, Dir.Ryota Nakanishi)
- Clandestine (2011, AV, MUTEKI, Dir.Ryota Nakanishi)

== Works ==
=== Photo books ===
- TSUGUMI (1997, III, Tokyo Sensei Inc.) ISBN 481260205X
- Girl (1997, Bunkasha) ISBN 4821121654
- Gekisha in Hawaii (1998, Shogakukan) ISBN 4093945853
- Bone (2001, Asahi Press) ISBN 4255001081
- Monthly shooting Tsugumi (2004, Shinchosha) ISBN 4107901238
