= Moonlight Whispers =

- Moonlight Whispers poster
- Directed by: Akihiko Shiota
- Screenplay by: Yoichi Nishiyama; Akihiko Shiota
- Based on: Gekko no Sasayaki by Masahiko Kikuni
- Produced by: Hiroyuki Negishi
- Starring: Kenji Mizuhashi; Tsugumi
- Cinematography: Shigeru Komatsubara
- Edited by: Yoshio Sugano
- Music by: Shinsuke Honda
- Production company: Nikkatsu
- Distributed by: Bitters End
- Release date: October 23, 1999 (Japan)
- Running time: 100 minutes
- Country: Japan
- Language: Japanese

Moonlight Whispers (Japanese: 月光の囁き, Hepburn: Gekko no Sasayaki) is a 1999 Japanese film directed by Akihiko Shiota and based on the manga Gekko no sasayaki by Masahiko Kikuni.

== Plot ==
A boy (Takuya) meets a girl (Satsuki), both 17 years of age, and they fall in love. When she discovers his fetishes, Satsuki brands Takuya hentai (pervert) and leaves him, only to be drawn back by the power his fetishes give her over him.

She has him watch as she has sex with another man, then asks him to lick her body.

== Cast ==
- Kenji Mizuhashi as Takuya Hidaka
- Tsugumi as Satsuki Kitahara
- Kōta Kusano as Tadashi Uematsu
- Harumi Inoue as Shizuka Kitahara
- Yoshiki Sekino as Maruken

== Reception ==
The film has received mixed reviews, scoring 57 out of 100 on the review aggregator site Metacritic.

== Awards ==
- 1999: Special Jury Prize at the 10th Yubari International Fantastic Film Festival
- 1999: Directors Guild of Japan New Directors Award
- 1999: Hochi Film Award (Best New Director for Akihiko Shiota)
- 1999: Locarno International Film Festival, Golden Leopard (Nomination for Akihiko Shiota)
- 2000: Japanese Professional Movie Award
  - Tsugumi (Best New Actress)
  - Akihiko Shiota (Best New Director)
- 2000: Mainichi Film Concours, Sponichi Grand Prize (New Talent Award for Akihiko Shiota)
- Yokohama Film Festival, Festival Prize
  - Best New Director Akihiko Shiota
  - Best New Talent Tsugumi

== See also ==
- Sadism and masochism in fiction
