= Atsuko Sakuraba =

Japanese model and actor (born 1976)

- Born: Akiko Kanari; March 29, 1976 (age 50); Kōriyama, Fukushima, Japan
- Years active: 1996–2012
- Height: 1.62 m (5 ft 4 in)
- Spouse: Unknown (m. 2012)
- Children: 3
- Website: www.light-breeze.com/akko/

Atsuko Sakuraba (桜庭 あつこ, Sakuraba Atsuko; real name Akiko Kanari (金成 亜希子, Kanari Akiko) born on March 29, 1976) is a former Japanese gravure idol, tarento, actress and one-time mixed martial arts fighter.

Sakuraba has appeared in several photobooks, films, and TV series. She also participated in the MMA tournament ReMix World Cup 2000.

== Biography ==
=== Background ===
Sakuraba was born March 29, 1976 in Koriyama, Fukushima, Japan. She graduated from the Koriyama Women's University Associated Senior High School.

=== Modeling and acting career ===
Sakuraba debuted in 1996 with the photobook Yume de Ippai (夢でいっぱい; Full of dreams) published by gravure publisher Scola. She began to appear on TV programs and in gravure videos the same year.

She made her acting debut in 1997 in the V-Cinema film Bichichi Daisakusen Miss Spy (美乳大作戦 メスパイ, bichichi daisakusen mesupai), directed by Minoru Kawasaki.

Sakuraba was romantically linked to Kenji Haga, her partner in the 1999 film Silver (directed by Takashi Miike) but it was later believed to be a publicity stunt.

In 1999, Sakuraba appeared in her first nude photobook titled Careyes and published by Roux Shuppan.

Her first theatrical film was Waru also directed by Takashi Miike.

Sakuraba has also participated in theatre.

On January 14, 2012, she announced her retirement from the entertainment industry, and on January 17, she announced her marriage.

== Publications ==
=== Photobooks ===
- Yume de Ippai (夢でいっぱい; Full of dreams), Scola, ISBN 978-4-7962-0390-6, May 1996
- in the room, Scola, ISBN 978-4-7962-0453-8, September 1997
- Careyes, Roux Shuppan, ISBN 978-4-89778-083-2, June 1999
- Ultimate Hunter: Guardless 4, Takeshobo, ISBN 978-4-8124-0770-7, July 2001

=== Videos ===
- Sakuraba Atsuko: Kakeru kita Megami (桜庭あつこ 駈けてきた女神), Scola, ISBN 978-4-7962-3067-4, June 1996
- Sakuraba Atsuko: Body Conscious (桜庭あつこ ボディコンシャス, sakuraba atsuko bodei konshasu), Eichi Publishing, ISBN 978-4-7542-6634-9, JAN 1902874032381, October 1997
- Careyes: Atsuko Sakuraba, SVC, ISBN 978-4-88288-415-6, JAN 1920876028009, October 1999
- Ultimate Hunter: Guardless 4 (VHS), Takeshobo, JAN 4985914111393, July 19, 2001
- Ultimate Hunter: Guardless 4 (DVD), Takeshobo, JAN 4985914118057, August 21, 2001

== Filmography ==
=== V-Cinema ===
- Bichichi Daisakusen Miss Spy (美乳大作戦 メスパイ, bichichi daisakusen mesupai) (directed by Minoru Kawasaki, February 14, 1997)
- Bad girls (directed by Minoru Akimoto and Yuzuru Ashiya, October 21, 1998)
- F·I·S·H (directed by Kenji Seki, August 19, 1998)
- Silver (directed by Takashi Miike, September 21, 1999)
- Jado: Jitsuroku Onna Sagi Shiden (蛇道 実録女詐欺師伝, jadō jitsuroku onna sagi shiden) (directed by Takeshi Yokoi, March 21, 2000)
- Ginza Midnight Story: Utopia (銀座ミッドナイトストーリー ゆーとぴあ, ginza middonaito sutōrī yūtopia) (directed by Hiroyuki Tsuji, July 21, 2000)
- Ginza Midnight Story: Utopia - Akai Cho (銀座ミッドナイトストーリー ゆーとぴあ, ginza middonaito sutōrī yūtopia akai chō) (directed by Hiroyuki Tsuji, August 25, 2000)
- Pachinko Battle Royale (パチンコ・バトル・ロワイアル, pachinko batoru rowaiaru) (directed by Kanta Tagawa, August 25, 2001)
- Mujinto Monogatari BRQ (無人島物語 BRQ, mujintō monogatari brq) (directed by Seiji Chiba and Kenji Tanigaki, February 8, 2002)
- Saikyoju Tanjou Nezulla (最強獣誕生 ネズラ, saikyōjū tanjō Nezulla; Nezulla, The Rat Monster) (directed by Kanta Tagawa, January 25, 2003)
- Two-F (directed by Kanta Tagawa, November 7, 2005)

=== Theatrical ===
- Waru (directed by Takashi Miike, February 25, 2006)
- Shinkaiju Raiga (深海獣雷牙, shinkai jū raiga; Deep Sea Monster Raiga) (directed by Shinpei Hayashiya, October 3, 2009)

=== TV programs ===
- Tamori Club (TV Asahi)
- Super Jockey (スーパージョッキー, sūpā jokkī) (Various)
- TBS Suffle Baku Chichi Mon-Star (TBSシャッフル・爆乳悶スター, tbs shaffuru baku chichi mon sutā) (Tokyo Broadcasting System)
- Gravure no Bishojo (グラビアの美少女, gurabia no bishōjo; Beautiful girls of Gravure) (Mondo21)

=== Theatre ===
- Kin no Hitsuji (金の羊; Sheep of money) (directed by Uson Kimu, 2003)
- Meriken (メリケン; American) (directed by Uji Takinosuke, 2004)
- Yami Kinyu VS Higashiikebukuro Yochien (ヤミ金融ＶＳ東池袋幼稚園, yami kinyū VS higashiikebukuro yōchien) (directed by Uson Kimu, 2005)

=== Others ===
Serialization: Sakuraba Atsuko no Action Cinema Kan (桜庭あつこのアクションシネマ館, Sakuraba Atsukono Akushonshinema Kan), Weekly Manga Action, February 2002 - February 2003

== Mixed martial arts career ==
Sakuraba had a MMA bout in the event ReMix World Cup 2000 on December 5, 2000, where she faced four-time national judo champion, 1993 and 1998 silver medallist and three-time World Cup winner Russian Tatyana Kuvshinova in a non-tournament fight. She was clearly outmatched by the Russian, and despite her spirited efforts, her corner decided to throw the towel in after her arm was injured in an armbar from which Sakuraba did not want to tap, dislocating her elbow in the process.

Sakuraba also participated in ReMix Golden Gate 2001, although merely as a TV commentator.

== Mixed martial arts record ==
Professional record breakdown
1 match	0 wins	1 loss
By knockout	0	1
Draws	0	

Res.	Record	Opponent	Method	Event	Date	Round	Time	Location	Notes
Loss	0-1-0	(Russia) Tatyana Kuvshinova	TKO (corner stoppage)	ReMix World Cup 2000	December 5, 2000	1	2:26	Tokyo, Japan	

== See also ==
- List of Japanese gravure idols
- List of Japanese actresses
- List of female mixed martial artists
