= Don't Look Back (1999 film) =

- DVD cover
- Directed by: Akihiko Shiota
- Written by: Akihiko Shiota
- Produced by: Kenzō Horikoshi; Hiroko Matsuda
- Starring: Yusaku Suzuki; Shingo Mizuno; Yuria Haga; Yuya Suzuki; Erina Noto
- Cinematography: Kazuhiro Suzuki
- Edited by: Takefumi Tsutsui
- Music by: Yūichi Kishino
- Production companies: Eurospace; Eiga Bi Gakkō
- Release date: October 23, 1999 (Japan)
- Running time: 75 minutes
- Country: Japan
- Language: Japanese

Don't Look Back (Japanese: どこまでもいこう, Hepburn: Dokomademo ikō; lit. "Let's Go Wherever") is a 1999 Japanese coming-of-age drama film, written and directed by Akihiko Shiota, that revolves around a series of incidents that test the friendship of two ten-year-old best friends.

== Plot summary ==
Best friends Akira and Koichi, known to get into mischief, are put in different classes when the new school term starts. Akira and Koichi aren't concerned as they're sure they could continue enjoying their mischievous adventures together.

Over next few weeks, Akira makes friends with Shun, a quiet nerd who's socially shunned for not having a father, while Koichi hangs out with Samajima, a charismatic thug who's been transferred from another town. Increasingly concerned that Koichi is spending more time with Samajima than him, Akira turns down Shun's birthday-party invitation to spend time with his best friend Koichi. Meanwhile, Koichi and Samajima go on a petty-crime spree, which excludes and irritates Akira.

When Akira learns that Shun's mentally ill mother has killed him before killing herself, he feels remorse for not being there when Shun needed him. He attempts to reach out to Koichi, but Koichi has problems of his own as he gets in trouble while Samajima abandons him. The final incident Koichi and Akira drives them to confront each other as a test of their friendship.

== Cast ==
- Yusaku Suzuki as Akira Hanada
- Shingo Mizuno as Kōichi Hikawa
- Yuria Haga as Tamayo Kimura
- Yuya Suzuki as Shun Nomura
- Erina Noto as Chisato Abe
- Hanako Onuki as Rika Fujisaki
- Sō Ando as Osamu Kinoshita
- Hiroko Hori as Akira's mother
- Kazuka Ishii as Kōichi's sister
- Houka Kinoshita as Metorupanchi
- Kyōji Matsumoto as Akira's father
- Kumi Nakamura as Nomura's mother
- Masashi Ono as Komiya
- Kyōtaro Shimizu as Takashi Samejima
- Kanji Tsuda as Tanabe
- Kazuya Uoji as Ikeda younger
- Tatsuya Uoji as Ikeda elder
- Eri Wakae as Kōichi's mother

== Title ==
Dokomademo ikō (どこまでもいこう; lit. (a place) where (we) can always return to) is a phrasal expression that conveys "it's okay to go wherever we want to go because we can always return to where we are now," but commonly translated as "let's go as far as it can take us," "let's go wherever it takes us," "let's go anywhere," "let's go somewhere far away" or "let's go somewhere." The nearest to this expression would be Que será, será.

== Awards ==
- Won: 1999 Directors Guild of Japan New Directors Award - Akihiko Shiota
