= Akihiko Shiota =

Japanese film director and screenwriter (born 1961)

- Born: 11 September 1961 (age 65); Maizuru, Kyoto, Japan
- Occupations: Film director, screenwriter
- Years active: 1982–present

Akihiko Shiota (塩田 明彦, Shiota Akihiko) (born 11 September 1961, Maizuru, Kyoto) is a Japanese film director and screenwriter.

== Career ==
Shiota attended Rikkyo University, where he was in a film club with other students such as Makoto Shinozaki and Shinji Aoyama and began making 8mm films in the tradition of other Rikkyo students like Kiyoshi Kurosawa. His independently made films were recognized at the Pia Film Festival and he began writing film criticism and working as an assistant for Kurosawa and other filmmakers. He also studied screenwriting under Atsushi Yamatoya, who wrote scenarios for Seijun Suzuki, and worked as the cinematographer for films by Takayoshi Yamaguchi.

His first two films as a director, Moonlight Whispers and Don't Look Back, were both released in 1999 and earned Shiota the Directors Guild of Japan New Directors Award. Don't Look Back also won the Jury Prize at the Three Continents Festival. Harmful Insect (2002) screened at the Venice Film Festival and earned two more awards at the Three Continents Festival. His first major commercial film, Yomigaeri, was the fourth biggest grossing Japanese film of 2003. Canary, his 2005 film inspired by the killings of Aum Shinrikyo in 1995, won the top prize at the Raindance Film Festival. Dororo, based on a manga by Osamu Tezuka, was the eighth top-grossing Japanese film of 2007.

== Style and influence ==
In a San Francisco Bay Guardian interview, Shiota talked about his influences: "Sam Peckinpah, Robert Aldrich, and Don Siegel were directors that I'd admired as the gods of movies since I was in elementary school. [...] In terms of films using youth as protagonists, I love the works by Vitali Kanevsky, the Russian filmmaker. [...] I also have deep admiration for Richard Fleischer and Joseph Losey."

== Filmography ==
- Moonlight Whispers (1999)
- Don't Look Back (1999)
- Gips (2001)
- Harmful Insect (2002)
- Yomigaeri (2003)
- Canary (2005)
- A Heartful of Love (2005)
- Dororo (2007)
- Dakishimetai: Shinjitsu no Monogatari (2014)
- Wet Woman in the Wind (2016)
- Farewell Song (2019)
- The World with Maki (2022)
- Picture of Spring (2023)

== Bibliography ==
- Eigajutsu: Sono Enshutsu wa Naze Kokoro o Tsukamunoka (2014)
