= The Girl Who Leapt Through Time (disambiguation) =

The Girl Who Leapt Through Time is a 1967 novel by Yasutaka Tsutsui.

The Girl Who Leapt Through Time may also refer to any of the film or television series adapted from or based on the novel:

- Toki o Kakeru Shōjo (1983 film)
- Toki o Kakeru Shōjo (1994 TV series)
- Toki o Kakeru Shōjo (1997 film)
- The Girl Who Leapt Through Time (2006 film)
- Time Traveller: The Girl Who Leapt Through Time, 2010 film

== See also ==
- The Girl Who Leapt Through Space
