= Yuko Shimizu (actress) =

Japanese actress and former gravure idol (born 1988)

- 清水 ゆう子
- Born: 22 November 1988 (age 37); Kanagawa Prefecture, Japan
- Occupations: Gravure idol; actress; tarento
- Years active: 2008–
- Agent: YMN
- Height: 153 cm (5 ft 0 in)
- Spouse: Kyohei Nakamura (m. 2017)
- Awards: Nittelegenic 2009

Yuko Shimizu (清水 ゆう子, Shimizu Yūko; born 22 November 1988) is a Japanese actress and former gravure idol. She is represented by YMN.

== Biography ==
Shimizu was elected in the Nittelegenic 2009. She was chosen at Gravure Japan's semi-Grand Prix. She served as a supporter for the 2010 Winter Olympics and participated in the 2010 Tokyo Marathon. Shimizu was represented by Feather International, transferring to YMN in 2012.

She married professional baseball player Kyohei Nakamura of the Hiroshima Toyo Carps on 2 February 2017. After her marriage she retired from being a gravure idol.

== Videography ==
Year	Title
2009	Yu-co with Love
2009	Nittelegenic 2009 Yuko Shimizu
2010	Yuko Shimizu with Yu
2010	Yuko Shimizu –Traveling–
2010	Yuko Shimizu Last summer
2011	Yuko Shimizu Start!
2013	cattleya
2014	Sensations
2015	Misudo mis*dol
2016	Misudo mis*dol

== Filmography ==
=== Television ===
Year	Title	Network
2009	Idol no Ana: Nittelegenic o Sagase!	NTV
2009	Nittelegenic no Ana	NTV
2009	Shimura Yadesu	Fuji TV
2009	Masahiro Nakai no Black Variety	NTV
2009	Zero × Senkyo	NTV
2009	24-Jikan TV: Ai wa Chikyū o Sukuu	NTV
2009	Gekkan Soccer Earth	NTV
2010	Kokoro yusabure! Senpai Rock You	NTV
2010	Konyamo Doru Bako!!	TV Tokyo
2010	Ōsama no Brunch	TBS
2011	Jōhō Mankitsu Variety: shūmatsu ni shitai 10 no koto!	NTV
2012	Tokumei Tantei	TV Asahi
2012	Kaigai Ikunara kōde nēto!	TV Tokyo
2013	Tabe Colle	TV Tokyo
2013	Sakigake! Ongaku Banzuke	Fuji TV
2013	Uchimura to Zawatsuku Yoru	TBS
2014	Gossip Girl Kanzen Kōryaku SP	
2014	Is There a Vet in the House?	YTV
2016	Yoso de Iwan to Itei: Koko dakeno Hanashi ga Kikeru (Hi) Ryōtei	TV Tokyo
2016	Kinyōbi no Kikitai Onna-tachi	Fuji TV
2016	Hashimoto × Hatori no Bangumi	TV Asahi
2016	Utsutchatta Eizō GP	Fuji TV
2016	Neo Kessen Variety: King-chan	TV Tokyo

=== Advertisements ===
Year	Title
2013	Fumakilla "Allele Shut" "Kafun Show"
2013	Fumakilla "Allele Shut" "Elevator"

=== Radio ===
Year	Title	Network
	Madamada Gocha ma ze'! Atsumare Yan Yan	MBS Radio
2010	J Tomoaki's Radio Show!	Shimokita FM
2011	Jinji Takada-Michiko Kawai no Tokyo paradise	NCB
2012	Ken Shimura no First Stage: Hajime no Ippo	JFN

=== Films ===
Year	Title
2009	Hop Step Jump'!
2010	Zebraman 2: Attack on Zebra City
2011	Gekiazu: Manatsu no Etude

=== Stage ===
2010	Trifle –reorder–
2011	Kokansetsu!

=== Internet ===
Year	Title	Website
2009	Tetsurō Degawa no Ore o oishiku shiro!	Ameba Studio
2009	Digimote	Dai 2 NTV

=== Fashion shows ===
Title	Notes
Kansai Collection	Guest model
Sapporo Collection	Guest model

=== Advertising model ===
Title	Product	Notes
109 Mitumaru	Layla Rose	Image model
2008 supring	Collaboration	Image poster
Hyper Laundry	Collaboration	Image model
Renude	Pimple Keshōhin	Image model

=== Music videos ===
Artist	Song
Misako Sakazume	"Koi no Tanjōbi"

=== Direct-to-video ===
Year	Title
2010	Vengeful Zebra Mini-Skirt Police

== Bibliography ==
=== Photo albums ===
Year	Title	ISBN
2009	Yu-co with Love	ISBN 978-4860461201

=== Magazines ===
Title	Publisher
Weekly Playboy	Shueisha
Young Magazine	Kodansha
Weekly Young Jump	Shueisha
Young Champion	Akita Shoten
Young Animal	Hakusensha
Young Animal Arashi	Hakusensha
Young Gangan	Square Enix
Spa!	Fusosha Publishing
Flash	Kobunsha
Jelly	Bunkasha
Fine	Hinode Shuppan
nuts	Inforest
S Cawaii!	Shufunotomo
Nail up!	Boutique-sha
Baikichi	Easy Publishing
nadesico	Inforest
