= Miho Takagi =

Miho Takagi may refer to:

- Miho Takagi (actress) (born 1962), Japanese actress and essayist
- Miho Takagi (speed skater) (born 1994), Japanese long track speed skater
