= Emily Hirst =

Canadian former child actor (born 1993)

- Born: July 9, 1993 (age 32); Vancouver, British Columbia, Canada
- Occupation: Actor
- Years active: 1998–2011

Emily Hirst (born July 9, 1993) is a Canadian former child actor. Her last screen appearance was an uncredited role in A Fairly Odd Movie: Grow Up, Timmy Turner (2011).

== Career ==
Hirst was born in Vancouver, British Columbia, Canada. Hirst first appeared in the TV series The Twilight Zone in 2002 and she has a small role in X2: X-Men United as The "Ice Cream Girl" in 2003.

Her first larger role was in the film drama Desolation Sound, where she played Margaret Elliot. For this role she was nominated for a Leo Award in 2005. She played Laura in the Lifetime movie For the Love of a Child in 2006. She won a Young Artists Award for that role. She was also nominated for her supporting guest role in Smallville's "Fragile" (2006). In 2007, Hirst had a recurring role as the childlike vampire Charlotte on Spike TV's Blade: The Series with rapper Sticky Fingaz. Her next appearance was in the thriller Mem-o-re with Billy Zane as Bonnie McHale.

In 2007 Hirst played Mandy Tarr in the Lifetime movie Passion's Web and Young Mary in Second Sight. She also appeared briefly in Battlestar Galactica: Razor. Her next role was Alice in a movie called The Egg Factory which was renamed Prodigy, and featured a number of times on Movie Central.

In 2008, Hirst played Makoto Konno in the English dubbed version of the award-winning Japanese anime film The Girl Who Leapt Through Time alongside Andrew Francis, for which she won a Young Artists Award in 2009. Also in 2008, Hirst appeared in a made-for-TV movie with Daryl Hannah called Storm Seekers.

In February 2009, she filmed Stranger With My Face with Alexz Johnson, Catherine Hicks, and Andrew Francis.

== Filmography ==
Year	Title	Role	Notes
2002	The Twilight Zone	Little Girl	Episode "Future Trade"
2002	X2	Ice Cream Girl	Uncredited
2005	Desolation Sound	Margaret Elliot	
2006	For the Love of a Child	Laura	
2006	Smallville	Maddie Van Horn	Episode: "Fragile"
2006	The Girl Who Leapt Through Time	Makoto Konno	voice: English version
2006	Blade: The Series	Charlotte	6 episodes
2006	Memory	Bonnie McHale	
2007	Passion's Web	Mandy Tarr	Television film
2007	Battlestar Galactica: Razor	Child In Cage	Television film
2007	Second Sight	Young Mary Kaufman	Television film
2008	The Egg Factory	Alice	
2009	Storm Seekers	Sarah Stewart	Television film
2009	Stranger With My Face	Alexis Stratton	Television film
2011	Matty Hanson and the Invisibility Ray	Alice / Sarah	
2011	A Fairly Odd Movie: Grow Up, Timmy Turner	Veronica Star	Uncredited

== Awards ==
Leo Awards

- 2005 - Nominated - Feature Length Drama: Best Supporting Performance by a Female for: Desolation Sound (2005)

Young Artist Awards

- 2007 - Won - Best Performance in a TV Movie, Miniseries or Special (Comedy or Drama) - Supporting Young Actress for: "For the Love of a Child" (2006) (TV)
- 2007 - Nominated - Best Performance in a TV Series (Comedy or Drama) - Guest Starring Young Actress for: "Smallville"
- 2009 - Won - Best Performance in a Voice-Over Role - Young Actress for: "The Girl Who Leapt Through Time" (English version) (2008)
