= Kaiba =

Japanese anime television series

- Key visual of the series

カイバ
- Genre: Science fiction
- Created by: Masaaki Yuasa
- Anime television series
- Directed by: Masaaki Yuasa
- Produced by: Hiroyuki Kitaura; Yukiko Futakata; Manabu Tamura; Chiaki Ikeshima
- Written by: Masaaki Yuasa
- Music by: Kiyoshi Yoshida
- Studio: Madhouse
- Licensed by: AUS: Siren Visual; BI: Anime Limited; NA: Discotek Media
- Original network: Wowow
- Original run: April 10, 2008 – July 24, 2008
- Episodes: 12
- icon

Kaiba (Japanese: カイバ) is a Japanese anime television series produced by Madhouse. The series is created, written, and directed by Masaaki Yuasa, and was broadcast for 12 episodes on Wowow from April to July 2008. In North America, the series is licensed by Discotek Media. The story revolves around an enigmatic character named Warp and takes place in a strange world mixed with a universe where changing bodies and trafficking memories are possible.

In 2008, Kaiba won the Excellence Award at the 12th Japan Media Arts Festival.

== Synopsis ==
=== Setting ===
In Kaiba's universe, memories can be stored as information via a memory chip; when individuals die, their minds live on. This digitization of mental information allows for the transfer of one's mind to someone else's body, and the theft and manipulation of other people's memories has become the norm. Society is largely divided into two classes. In the skies are electrical storms, which cannot be passed through without losing one's memories. Above them lies the realm of the wealthy and powerful, who barter others' bodies and memories for their own enjoyment and longevity. Below the clouds is a troubled and dangerous world where good bodies are hard to come by and real money is scarce.

=== Plot ===
The series begins with a man named Kaiba (Warp) as he awakens in a ruined room. He has no memories, but he has a hole in his chest, a triangular mark on his stomach, and a pendant with a picture of an unknown girl inside. After being attacked, Kaiba escapes with the help of an unknown ally and, through his travels, slowly regains his memories. Meanwhile, the woman from the pendant struggles with her own convictions and her past, which may be intertwined with Kaiba's origins.

== Characters ==
Kaiba (カイバ) or Warp (ワープ, Wāpu)
Voiced by: Houko Kuwashima
A man who does not speak very much. He has a hole in the middle of his chest and a tattoo of three circles forming a triangle on his stomach. At the beginning of the show, he has no memories he can access.
Neiro (ネイロ)
Voiced by: Mamiko Noto
A woman who shares an unknown connection with Kaiba. In the beginning, little is known about her, although she is currently under the care of Popo. A broadcast reports about a "memory tank" exploding, releasing thousands of memories into space in the form of orange egg capsules; it is believed that Neiro is responsible for this incident.
Popo (ポポ)
Voiced by: Romi Park
Popo is the first to encounter Kaiba upon awakening. After crossing paths with him again, he explains to Kaiba the nature of the current world, and that his life is in danger. Giving him the temporary name "Warp", Popo smuggles him onto the freight ship Neuron while creating a diversion for him to escape from Mantle, a man who is after Kaiba's special body.
Dada-sama (ダダ様)
The shady man behind Issoudan (lit. One Mind Society), regarded as a near-religious figure by its members; however, Popo is not as reverent. Later in the series, it is revealed that Dada-sama is actually three different people in aged Warp clones, working to take back the throne from the original Warp.
Vanilla (バニラ, Banira)
Voiced by: Hisao Egawa
The sheriff on board the ship Neuron. Though Vanilla is extremely strict and often sadistic in enforcing his authority, and enjoys doing so thoroughly, he is willing to make deals, accept bribery, and/or steal memory chips for himself. He also has a weakness for extremely cute girls. He has a crush on Chroniko (which, in actuality, is Kaiba in Chroniko's body) and goes to great lengths to ensure her/his safety. This devotion comes to a head when the two are on the run from higher authorities. While fleeing, he transfers Kaiba's and Hyo-Hyo's memories elsewhere as their ship is under bombardment, knowing well that they would be unable to escape, and tells Chroniko that he had back up bodies elsewhere to comfort her/him. However, after making sure that Chroniko (Kaiba)'s memories are safe, it is revealed that there was no such insurance, and perishes alongside Chroniko's body when the ship is destroyed.
Kaba (カバ)
A stuffed animal-like body that resembles a hippo. Kaiba uses this body to smuggle himself in the ship. It is very difficult for him to move around in this state, and he is also incapable of speech or expressing facial emotion. While using Chroniko's body, Kaiba also makes use of the hippo body when he doesn't feel like being harassed or chased after by Vanilla. Despite its status as a substitute, Kaiba has an attachment towards it, and shows a brief moment of grief when it is destroyed.
Hyo-Hyo (ひょーひょー, Hyōhyō)
Voiced by: Wasabi Mizuta
A small intelligent creature that accompanies Kaiba after flying aboard the ship. It cannot speak intelligible language (though it does have a voice) and it flies around, spinning its two antennae like propeller blades to float. Hyo-Hyo goes to great lengths to make sure Kaiba avoids capture. It is revealed near the end of the series that due to Kichi's displeasure at being ordered by Popo modify Neiro's memories, he backed up Neiro's original, un-altered memories in Hyo-Hyo. Thus, Hyo-Hyo was actually Neiro trying to help Kaiba remember his memories and who she is. However, by the end, Neiro and Hyo-Hyo have experienced a completely different series of events, creating two people from one, and prompting the question of which is the "real" Neiro.
Chroniko (クロニコ, Kuroniko), alternatively spelled Cronico
Voiced by: Chiwa Saitō
A girl Kaiba meets during a stop Neuron makes. She sells her body (literally) so that the money can support her family and hopes that someday her family will become wealthy enough to buy her a new body in the future. However, she is killed by a corrupt doctor (by simply releasing her mind rather than putting it in a chip and sending it to her family), and her body is sold anyway. Before her body is taken by buyers, Hyo-Hyo places Kaiba's mind inside her body, and Kaiba uses this disguise to avoid capture and get back aboard Neuron.
Paru (パル), alternatively spelled Pal
An ostrich-like creature who saves Kaiba. It is revealed that Paru contains the memories of Kaiba's mother.

== Release ==
Kaiba was produced by Madhouse and directed by Masaaki Yuasa. Yuasa also wrote the screenplay, while the character design was made by Nobutaka Ito. The series was broadcast from April 10 to July 24, 2008, in Wowow. The title "Kaiba" refers to the brain's memory-related organ hippocampus.

The anime series was licensed in Australia by Siren Visual in 2011. In September 2017, Discotek Media announced they would be licensing the show for physical distribution in North America. In 2022, Anime Limited licensed it in the United Kingdom. It was made available for streaming on Crunchyroll in May 2019.

=== Theme songs ===
Opening theme

"Never" by Seira Kagami

Ending theme

"Carry Me Away" by Seira Kagami

Insert songs

"The Tree Song" by Minako "Mooki" Obata
"Ki no Uta" (木の歌) by Ai Orikasa (a Japanese version of "The Tree Song")

=== Episodes ===
No.	Title	Original release date
1	"Your Name is Warp"; Transliteration: "Na wa Wāpu" (Japanese: 名はワープ)	April 10, 2008
2	"Stowaway"; Transliteration: "Mikkou" (Japanese: 密航)	April 17, 2008
3	"Chroniko's Boots"; Transliteration: "Kuroniko no Nagagutsu" (Japanese: クロニコのながぐつ)	April 24, 2008
4	"The Room of Grandma's Memories"; Transliteration: "Baasan no Kioku no Heya" (Japanese: ばあさんの記憶の部屋)	May 1, 2008
5	"Abipa, the Promised Planet"; Transliteration: "Akogare no Hoshi Abipa" (Japanese: 憧れの星アビパ)	May 8, 2008
6	"The Muscled Woman"; Transliteration: "Kinnikushitsu na Onna" (Japanese: 筋肉質な女)	May 15, 2008
7	"A Forgettable Man"; Transliteration: "Kioku ni Nokora nai Otoko" (Japanese: 記憶に残らない男)	May 22, 2008
8	"False Face"; Transliteration: "Bakenokawa" (Japanese: 化けの皮)	June 12, 2008
9	"Kill Warp!"; Transliteration: "Wāpu wo Ute!" (Japanese: ワープを討て！)	June 19, 2008
10	"Kaiba"; Transliteration: "Kaiba" (Japanese: カイバ)	July 10, 2008
11	"Spinning Fans"; Transliteration: "Mawaru Fan" (Japanese: まわるファン)	July 17, 2008
12	"Everyone in the Clouds"; Transliteration: "Minna Kumo no Naka" (Japanese: みんな雲の中)	July 24, 2008

== Reception ==
Kaiba was awarded the Excellence Award in the Animation Division at the 12th Japan Media Arts Festival in 2008.

THEM Anime Reviews gave the series 4 out of 5 stars, and praised the anime for its outstanding animation, story and visuals, saying, "Visually, Kaiba excites. It is certainly soft on the eye and the art style leaves the animators open to draw some incredibly evocative backdrops for the worlds that our lead visits and sees. The grace of its aesthetics, its power and emotionality when it does get it right make it an instant recommendation". Anime News Network highlighted the animation and the story of the series, lauding multiple aspects of the show, calling it a "Well-thought-out setting, fascinating visuals and the plot builds up as series progresses".

The Encyclopedia of Science Fiction described Kaiba as a rich and impressive anime, praising its distinctive, imaginative visual style, which combines childlike character designs with psychedelic imagery. It highlighted the contrast between this playful aesthetic and the often bleak and tragic events depicted in the narrative. The encyclopedia identified personal identity as the series' central theme, particularly its exploration of a society in which memories can be edited, transferred and stored independently of physical bodies. It also emphasized the social inequalities arising from this technology, including the exploitation of the poor by wealthy individuals who purchase replacement bodies. Although acknowledging the complexity of the narrative and its frequent tragedies, it praised the energy of its storytelling and its combination of humor, adventure and philosophical speculation about the relationship between memory, consciousness and identity.
