= Riisa Naka =

Japanese actress (born 1989)

- 仲 里依紗
- Born: October 18, 1989 (age 37); Higashisonogi, Nagasaki, Japan
- Occupation: Actress
- Years active: 2002–present
- Notable work: Fight (2005); Toki wo Kakeru Shoujo (animated 2006, live 2010); Alice in Borderland (2020)
- Spouse: Akiyoshi Nakao (m. 2013)
- Children: 1

Riisa Naka (仲 里依紗, Naka Riisa; born October 18, 1989) is a Japanese actress. She was given a Best New Talent award at the 2009 Yokohama Film Festival. Naka became famous by appearing in Hachi One Diver (2008) and played the lead, Hana Adachi, in Yankee-kun to Megane-chan (2010). Naka also portrayed cousins Makoto Konno and Akari Yoshiyama who are the protagonists in respectively the 2006 anime film The Girl Who Leapt Through Time and the 2010 live action movie Time Traveller: The Girl Who Leapt Through Time, both of which are based on the 1967 novel Toki wo Kakeru Shoujo by Yasutaka Tsutsui.

== Personal life ==
Naka has a Swedish grandfather, making her one-quarter Swedish and three-quarters Japanese. She was named Riisa after Leonardo da Vinci’s Mona Lisa painting which her grandfather had an affection for.

She was given a Best New Talent award at the 2009 Yokohama Film Festival and became famous by appearing in Hachi One Diver, a drama that aired in 2008.

Naka co-starred with actor Akiyoshi Nakao in Toki wo Kakeru Shoujo in 2010 and again in the NHK drama Tsurukame Josanin, which aired in August 2012. They started dating after the filming for the drama ended in October 2012.

In spring 2013, it was announced that Naka would marry Nakao, with the wedding being held on March 21, 2013. On October 4, 2013, Naka gave birth to the couple's first child, a son, at a hospital in Tokyo.

On April 11, 2025, she announced that she left Amuse since her first debut to work independently.

Her skills are Japanese dancing, piano, and swimming.

== Filmography ==
=== Dramas ===
- My Boss My Hero (2006), Chiba Akane
- Yakusha Damashii (2006), episode 7 guest
- Broccoli (2007)
- Ultraman Mebius (2007), episode 40 guest
- Jodan janai (2007), Hirose Karen
- Sexy Voice and Robo (2007), episode 5 guest
- Binbō Danshi (2008), Shinjo Sumire
- Hachi One Diver (2008), Soyo Nakashizu/ Milk
- Gakko ja Oshierarenai! (2008), Yokoyama Eri
- Kami no Shizuku (2009), co-starring, Shinohara Miyabi
- Ninkyou Helper (2009), Haruna Misora
- Koibana: Suika to Bansoukou (2009)
- Yankee-kun to Megane-chan (2010), Hana Adachi (lead)
- The Japanese The Japanese Don't Know (2010), Kano Haruko (lead)
- Sayonara Aruma (2010), Takahashi Fumiko
- Party wa Owatta (2011), Toake
- Shiawase ni Narou yo (2011), Sakuragi Marika
- Lucky Seven (2012), Mizuno Asuka
- Tsurukame Maternity Center (2012), Onodera Mariya
- Resident – 5-nin no Kenshui (2012), Miyama Shizuku
- Lucky Seven SP (2013), Mizuno Asuka
- Cold Case (2016)
- I love You Just a Little Bit (2017), Reika Arishima
- Black Leather Notebook (2017), Namiko Yamada
- Plage ~ Wakeari bakari no share house (2017), Koike Miwa
- Yell (2020), Megumi Katori
- Koisuru Hahatachi (2020), Kanbara Mari
- Alice in Borderland (2020–2022), Mira Kanō
- Tokyo MER: Mobile Emergency Room (2021), Chiaki Takanawa
- Ōoku: The Inner Chambers (2023), Tokugawa Tsunayoshi
- Let's Get Divorced (2023), Yui Kurosawa
- Extremely Inappropriate! (2024), Nagisa Inushima
- Omusubi (2024–25), Ayumi Yoneda
- The 19th Medical Chart (2025), Todo Kuroiwa
- Extremely Inappropriate! Special (2026), Nagisa Inushima
- Plastic Beauty (2026), Rin Toyama
- Tokyo Mid 30s (2026), Maki Sakura

=== Movies ===
- The Girl Who Leapt Through Time (2006), Makoto Konno
- Island Times (2006), Yuki
- Shibuya-ku Maruyama-cho (2006), Yumi
- Chi-chan wa Yukyu no Muko (2008), Chigusa Utashima
- Gachi Boy (2008), Akane Igarashi
- It's So Quiet (2008), Chizuru
- Jun Kissa Isobe (2008), Sakiko Isobe
- An Encyclopedia of Unconventional Women (2009), Ryoko
- Pandora no Hako (2009), Mabo
- Summer Wars (2009), Yumi Jinnouchi
- Time Traveller: The Girl Who Leapt Through Time (2010), Akari Yoshiyama
- Zebraman 2: Attack on Zebra City (2010), Zebra Queen/Yui
- Hara ga Kore Nande (2011), Hara Mitsuko
- Moteki (2011), Ai
- Young Black Jack (2011), Yuna
- Brave Hearts: Umizaru (2012), Mika
- The Mole Song: Undercover Agent Reiji (2014)
- The Mole Song: Hong Kong Capriccio (2016)
- A Forest of Wool and Steel (2018), Eri Hamano
- My Dad Is a Heel Wrestler (2018), Michiko
- Love At Least (2018)
- Brothers in Brothel (2021), Ibuki
- The Mole Song: Final (2021)
- Crayon Shin-chan: Shrouded in Mystery! The Flowers of Tenkazu Academy (2021), Ageha (voice)
- Tokyo MER: Mobile Emergency Room – The Movie (2023), Chiaki Takanawa
- Between the White Key and the Black Key (2023), Chikako
- The Imaginary (2023), Emily (voice)
- Cells at Work! (2024), NK Cell
- Tokyo MER: Mobile Emergency Room – Capital Crisis (2026), Chiaki
- Sukiyaki (2026), Masako Ei
- The High School Family (2027), Shizuka Ietani

=== Plays ===
- Dokurojo no Shichinin (2011)

=== Dubbing ===
- Trolls World Tour (2020) - Queen Barb
- Transformers: Rise of the Beasts (2023) - Elena Wallace (Dominique Fishback)

=== Music videos ===
- Kimi wa Boku ni Niteiru (2005) - See-Saw
- Captain Straydum (2006) - Cyborg
- Nostalgia (2010) - Ikimono Gakari
- Honto Wa Kowai Ai To Romance (2010) - Keisuke Kuwata
- Boku Kimi Believer (2010) - Ghostnote

== Discography ==
- "Namida (Kokoro Abaite)" (NAMIDA～ココロアバイテ～; "Tears (Through His Heart)") as Zebra Queen (2010)
