= Toki o Kakeru Shōjo (1997 film) =

- DVD cover
- Directed by: Haruki Kadokawa
- Screenplay by: Ryōji Itō; Chiho Katsura; Haruki Kadokawa
- Based on: The Girl Who Leapt Through Time by Yasutaka Tsutsui
- Produced by: Katsuhiko Aoki; Haruki Kadokawa; Mitsuru Kurosawa
- Starring: Nana Nakamoto; Shunsuke Nakamura; Mitsuko Baisho; Takaaki Enoki; Mariko Hamatani
- Narrated by: Tomoyo Harada
- Cinematography: Seizō Sengen
- Edited by: Nobutake Kamiya
- Music by: Masataka Matsutoya; Sachiko Kumagai
- Production companies: Kadokawa Haruki Corporation; Central Arts; Tri-Arts
- Distributed by: The Girl Who Leapt Through Time Screening Committee
- Release date: 8 November 1997 (Japan)
- Running time: 106 minutes
- Country: Japan
- Language: Japanese
- Budget: ¥130 million

Toki o Kakeru Shōjo (Japanese: 時をかける少女; lit. The Girl Who Runs Through Time) is a 1997 Japanese science fiction romance drama film directed by Haruki Kadokawa, with a screenplay by Kadokawa, Ryōji Itō and Chiho Katsura. It is the second live-action film adaptation of the novel of the same name by Yasutaka Tsutsui. The film stars beginner actress Nana Nakamoto in the main role, and is narrated by the previous adaptation's lead actress Tomoyo Harada. Its story is set in 1965, the year of the novel's initial publication; to emphasize this, the film was shot in black and white. The film poster was used as the new cover for the 1997 edition of the novel. Toki o Kakeru Shōjo was theatrically released on November 8, 1997, in Japan.

== Cast ==
- Nana Nakamoto as Kazuko Yoshiyama
- Shunsuke Nakamura as Kazuo Fukamachi
- Mitsuko Baisho as Yukiko Yoshiyama
- Takaaki Enoki as Teacher
- Mariko Hamatani (ja:浜谷真理子) as Mariko Kamiya
- Yu Hayami as Teacher Ohara
- Masatō Ibu as Masato Yoshiyama
- Yoshiko Kuga as Michie Yoshiyama
- Hironobu Nomura as Teacher Fukushima
- Tsunehiko Watase as Antique Dealer
- Itsumi Yamamura as Kozue Endo
- Jou Hayami as Goro Asakura

== Production ==
Shooting lasted for 12 days. The film was shot on location in Hida, Kōbōyama Kofun and Matsumoto Fukashi High School. Kadokawa's parents' house in Ogikubo, Tokyo was used for the protagonist's home.

A poem by Emily Dickinson plays an important role in the film's screenplay, despite not featuring in the original novel or the 1983 adaptation. Screenwriters Itō and Katsura selected it as they thought the poem was a fitting metaphor for the story overall; Kadokawa agreed to let them use it, as Kadokawa Shoten had published a collection of Dickinson's poems during his tenure at the company.

== Theme songs ==
The film includes two theme songs: "Yume no Naka de ~We are not alone, forever~" and "Toki no Canzone", the latter being a remake of the 1983 film's self-titled theme song. Both were written and sung by Yumi Matsutoya. The latter song's lyrics were changed to reference the Dickinson poem used in this adaptation.

== Release ==
Toki o Kakeru Shōjo was theatrically released on November 8, 1997, in Japan. It was given a limited release in 7 theaters. Prior to its release, home video rights were sold to Bandai Visual for ¥30 million, and 40,000 advance tickets were purchased (equivalent to approx. ¥60 million).
