= Namida (Kokoro Abaite) =

Single by Zebra Queen
- A-side: "Namida (Kokoro Abaite)"
- B-side: "Zebra Queen no Thema"
- Released: April 21, 2010
- Recorded: 2010
- Genre: J-Pop
- Length: 14:31
- Label: Sony Music Records
- Composer(s): Makoto Ogata, Noriki Ijiri
- Lyricist(s): Hidenori Tanaka, Emmy

"Namida (Kokoro Abaite)" (NAMIDA～ココロアバイテ～, translated as "Tears (Through His Heart)") is the theme song to the film Zebraman 2: Attack on Zebra City, released as a CD single on April 21, 2010. The song is performed by actress Riisa Naka under the name Zebra Queen (ゼブラクイーン, Zebura Kuīn), the character she portrays in the film. In the plot of the film, the song is said to have been the #1 song for 40 weeks straight during the year 2025. In real life, the single peaked at #22 on the Oricon Weekly Charts in 2010, remaining on the charts for 6 weeks. Naka states that she gave Zebra Queen a persona akin to Lady Gaga for the musical performances. In addition to a standard CD single release, a CD+DVD combo pack was released featuring music videos for both tracks with her back up dancers known as the Zebras (ゼブラーズ, Zeburāzu). In addition to these two music videos, an alternate music video for the B-Side was filmed featuring comedian Naomi Watanabe in place of Riisa Naka as Zebra Queen.

== Track list ==
1. "Namida (Kokoro Abaite)" (NAMIDA～ココロアバイテ～) - 3:21
  - Lyrics: Hidenori Tanaka, Emmy
  - Composition: Makoto Ogata, Noriki Ijiri
  - Arrangement: Masahiro Tobinai
2. "Zebra Queen no Thema" (ゼブラクイーンのテーマ, Zebura Kuīn no Tēma, "Theme of Zebra Queen") - 3:56
  - Lyrics: Kankurō Kudō
  - Composition & Arrangement: Masahiro Tobinai
3. "Namida (Kokoro Abaite) <Inst.>" - 3:21
4. "Zebra Queen no Thema <Inst.>" - 3:54
