= Early Spring Story =

- DVD cover

Japanese name
- Kanji: 早春物語
- Kana: Sōshun Monogatari
- Directed by: Shinichirō Sawai
- Screenplay by: Machiko Nasu
- Based on: Sōshun Monogatari by Jirō Akagawa
- Produced by: Haruki Kadokawa; Mitsuru Kurosawa; Ryoji Ito
- Starring: Tomoyo Harada; Ryūzō Hayashi; Kunie Tanaka; Yuki Saori; Nobuko Sendo
- Cinematography: Seizō Sengen
- Edited by: Kiyoaki Saitō
- Music by: Joe Hisaishi
- Distributed by: Kadokawa Pictures
- Release date: September 14, 1985 (Japan)
- Running time: 96 minutes
- Country: Japan
- Language: Japanese

Early Spring Story (Japanese: 早春物語, Hepburn: Sōshun Monogatari) is a 1985 Japanese drama film directed by Shinichirō Sawai. The film is based on the novel of the same name by Jirō Akagawa.

== Plot ==
17-year-old Hitomi Okino's mother died four years ago, and her father has remarried, causing Hitomi to worry that her father is throwing away all memory of her mother. During spring vacation, Hitomi is taking pictures for her school's photography club when she encounters a middle-aged man named Kajikawa, whose car is blocking the shot she was hoping to take. She later meets him again during a traffic jam while on her bicycle, and as they have dinner introduces herself as a 20-year-old college student. A few days later, she makes her way all the way to Tokyo and his workplace, and tags along with him to an evening party.

On the anniversary of her mother's death, Hitomi discovers Kajikawa in an old photo of her mother's of a group hiking, and finds out that her mother and Kajikawa were once lovers, but that Kajikawa was the one who broke off the relationship. When Hitomi next encounters Kajikawa, she invites herself along for a drive to the location where that picture had been taken and tries to subtly question him about his memories of the place, to no avail. Later, over dinner, she drinks too much and tries to clumsily seduce him. Instead, he drives her back home, realizing that she's never kissed anyone before. Hitomi, determined to find out about her mother, slips the photo into his briefcase. She also finds out from her father that theirs was an arranged marriage.

During a meeting at work, Kajikawa receives a call from Hitomi, asking if he's seen the photo, which he hasn't. He pulls it out, realizes what it is, and meets her later in a cafe where she finally tells him that she's the daughter of that woman, and that her mother has died. Kajikawa talks of their past relationship and refuses to apologize for either his actions or his moving forward with his life.

Later, Hitomi sees Kajikawa heading into a hotel with another woman and follows them into the elevator. The other woman realizes immediately that Hitomi and Kajikawa have some kind of relationship, and forces the two together. In the hotel, Hitomi attempts to seduce Kajikawa again, saying she'll be just like her mother was, but Kajikawa refuses her and tells her to leave, locking himself in the bathroom. When Hitomi doesn't, and lays down in the hotel bed, Kajikawa begins pulling the covers off, which frightens her. Hitomi runs into the bathroom, Kajikawa throws her clothes at her, and the two leave the hotel in his car. Hitomi, calmer, keeps insisting that they stop at various love hotels, and when Kajikawa doesn't, grabs the steering wheel, causing an accident.

In the hospital, her minor injuries patched up, Hitomi asks Kajikawa to kiss her, not in place of her mother but as herself. He does, and the kiss turns passionate. Kajikawa meets with Hitomi's father to both tell him about their relationship and to return the photograph. Hitomi's father tells Kajikawa that he was the man Hitomi's father could never forget.

A subplot involving the relationship between one of Hitomi's classmates and a teacher at their school ends when that student commits suicide. At the funeral, Hitomi and Kajikawa talk again. Kajikawa has quit his job and will be returning to America, where he's been invited to join a friend's company.

Hitomi turns up at the last minute to see Kajikawa off at the airport, something her mother did not do. Kajikawa confesses that he has fallen in love with her. Hitomi says thank you, and goodbye, then walks away through the airport.

Over a still shot of the photo Hitomi took during her first encounter with Kajikawa, Hitomi can be heard talking to the same friend she was speaking to when the film opened. The friend says that she's a woman now she has experience, to which Hitomi counters that experience doesn't make a woman, that it is the pain of love, and that she herself is now a woman who has made a past for herself.

== Cast ==
- Tomoyo Harada as Hitomi Okino
- Ryūzō Hayashi as Shinji Kajikawa
- Kunie Tanaka as Okino, Hitomi's father
- Yuki Saori as Keiko Otake, Okino's fiancee
- Nobuko Sendo as Asako Maki
- Yukako Hayase as Masako Sawada
- Saiko Isshiki as Mizue
- Junko Miyashita as Junko Matsuura
- Risa Akikawa as Takako Ishihara
- Mikijirō Hira as Takenaka
- Kaneko Iwasaki as Mrs. Takenaka
- Nenji Kobayashi as Coffee shop owner
- Miho Takagi

== Awards and nominations ==
9th Japan Academy Prize

- Won: Best Director - Shinichirō Sawai

7th Yokohama Film Festival

- Won: Best Actress - Tomoyo Harada
- 5th Best Film
