= Luisa D'Oliveira =

Canadian actress (born 1986)

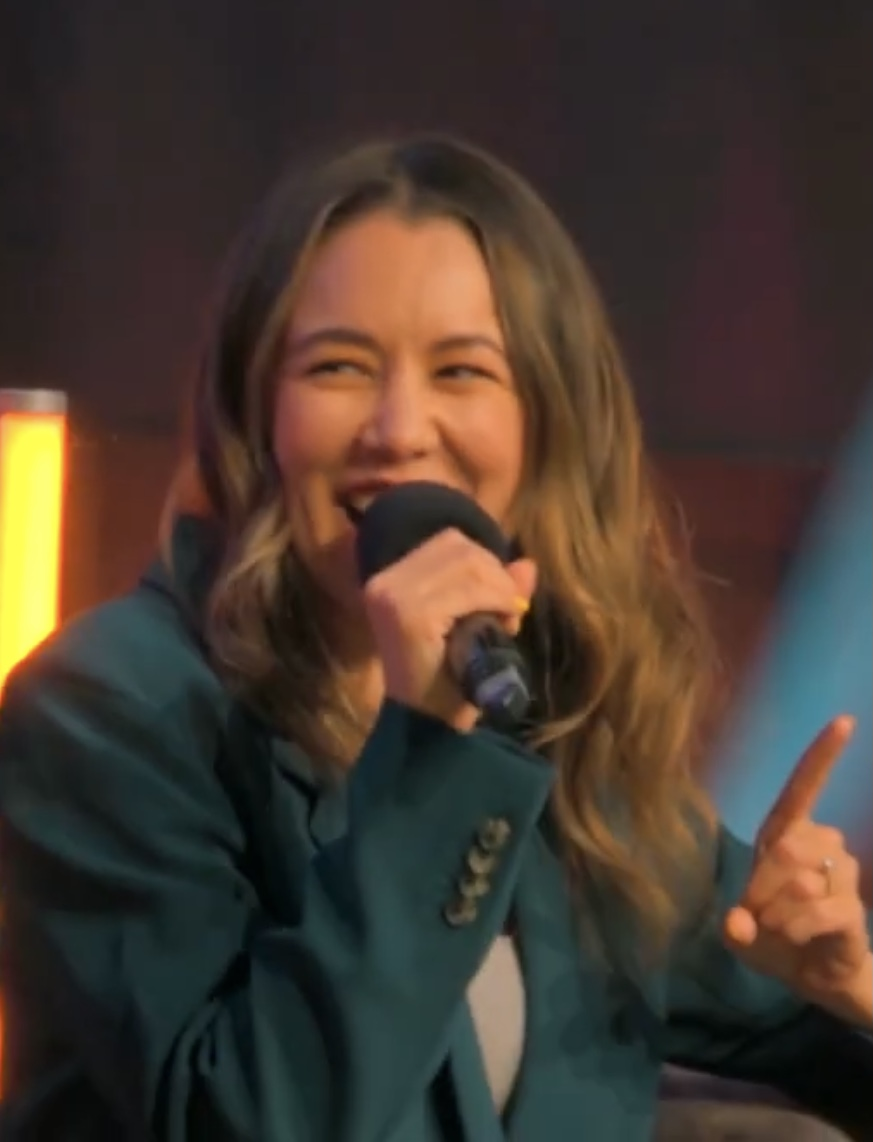
- D'Oliveira at the 2023 German Comic Con
- Born: October 6, 1986 (age 40); Vancouver, British Columbia
- Education: Capilano University
- Occupation: Actress
- Years active: 2007–present
- Known for: The 100; Cracked; Motive
- Spouse: Jez Bonham (m. 2023)

Luisa D'Oliveira (born October 6, 1986) is a Canadian actress. She began her career in 2007, guest-starring in shows such as Supernatural and Psych. She is best known for her role as Emori on the post-apocalyptic science fiction television series The 100. She also had roles as Agabelle in the comedy-drama film 50/50 (2011), as Aphrodite Girl in the 2010 fantasy film Percy Jackson & the Olympians: The Lightning Thief, and as Detective Poppy Wisnefski in the Canadian police crime drama Cracked (2013).

== Early life ==
Luisa D'Oliveira was born on October 6, 1986, in Vancouver, British Columbia. She acted and performed in several student films. She attended Capilano University for a full year, studying science, and then switched to arts for her second year. Afterwards, she returned to acting, saying, "it just wasn't creative enough for me, I found my way back to acting pretty quickly".

She has Portuguese, Chinese, French, Scottish and Irish ancestry.

== Personal life ==
D'Oliveira was raised in a Catholic household, but she no longer considers herself religious.

She played the piano and the guitar as a child.

She frequently worked in restaurants and bars to support herself while pursuing her acting career.

She has been married to musician Jez Dylan Bonham since November 6, 2023.

== Career ==
D'Oliveira's television debut was in Supernatural, an American dark fantasy TV series where she portrayed Jenny, a high school student attending a Halloween party. She subsequently appeared in multiple guest-starring roles, including Sissy in the comedy-drama series Psych. She then played Paloma in the American-Canadian action and drama TV film Storm Seekers, Sandra Pai in the CBS political drama The Good Wife, and Meredith in The CW's cheerleading comedy-drama Hellcats.

Between 2010 and 2012, D'Oliveira made minor appearances in feature films such as the fantasy film Percy Jackson & the Olympians: The Lightning Thief and the American drama 50/50, among other television roles.

In 2012, D'Oliveira obtained her first major leading role in the CBC drama TV series Cracked, which aired in 2013, where she played Poppy Wisnefski, a young, distrustful detective focused on crimes involving psychiatric conditions. She stated that this was her most challenging role up to that point, where she dealt with the "engaged but detached" demeanor that her character masked. After that, in 2014, she guest-starred in the Canadian police drama Rookie Blue as Essie. A year later, she had a role in the film Into the Grizzly Maze, portraying Zoe, an officer facing a rogue grizzly.

That same year, she secured a recurring role as Maria Snow for the third season of the CTV police procedural drama series Motive, appearing in a nine-episode arc. Her performance in the show earned her a nomination for the 2016 Leo Awards for Best Guest Performance by a Female in a Dramatic Series. D'Oliveira praised series lead Kristin Lehman, stating that she learned a lot by watching her in action and that Lehman served as an example of who she wanted to become.

== Filmography ==
Key
†	Denotes films that have not yet been released

=== Films ===
Year	Title	Role	Notes	ref.
2007	The Vent	Elizabeth	Short film	
2009	Fragile	Ana	Short film	
2009	The Break-Up Artist	Marisa		
2010	Percy Jackson & the Olympians: The Lightning Thief	Aphrodite Girl		
2011	50/50	Agabelle Loogenburgen		
2011	Alvin and the Chipmunks: Chipwrecked	Tessa		
2012	The Package	Receptionist		
2014	What Doesn't Kill You	Police Officer #1	Short film	
2015	Into the Grizzly Maze	Zoe		
2024	The Painter	Agent Kim		
TBA	Hot Chocolate †	Grace	Short film. Status: completed	
TBA	Vancity †	Sam	Short film. Status: post-production	

=== Television ===
Year	Title	Role	Notes
2008	Supernatural	Jenny	Episode: "It's the Great Pumpkin, Sam Winchester"
2008	Search and Rescue	Kierra	Episode: "Fistful of Rain"
2009	Psych	Sissy	Episode: "Tuesday the 17th"
2009	Storm Seekers	Paloma	Television film
2009	Stranger with My Face	Nat Colson	Television film
2009	The Good Wife	Sandra Pai	Episode: "Pilot"
2009	Ice Twisters	Ashley	Television film
2009	Hellcats	Meredith	Episode: "Remember When"
2011	To the Mat	Elizabeth Sutcliffe	Television film
2011	Seeds of Destruction	Kate	Television film; originally titled Seeds of Destruction
2011	The Secret Circle	Simone	Episode: "Wake"
2011	Space Twister	Megan MacGregor	Television film; originally titled "Mega Cyclone"
2012	Rags	MTV VJ	Television film
2012	The Selection	Fiona Castley	Unsold television pilot
2013	Cracked	Detective Poppy Wisnefski	Main role; 21 episodes
2014	Rookie Blue	Essie	Episode: Going Under
2015–2020	The 100	Emori	Recurring role (season 2–Season 7), 44 episodes
2015	Love on the Sidelines	Patty	Television film
2015	Motive	Maria Snow/Sonia Desesso	Recurring role (season 3), 9 episodes
2016	Channel Zero: Candle Cove	Amy Welch	Main role; 6 episodes
2019	The Twilight Zone	Grace Niu	Episode: "The Blue Scorpion"
2019	Supergirl	Elena Torres / Breathtaker	Guest role; 2 episodes
2020	My Best Friend's Bouquet	Emma	Television film
2021	Hudson & Rex	Eva Reed	Episode: "A Stab in the Dark Web"
2021	A Christmas Proposal	Brooklyn	Television film
2021	The Republic of Sarah	Piper Brindley	Recurring role (season 1), 3 episodes
2023	The Surrogate Scandal	Grace Hardy	Television film
2023	Wedding Season	Michelle	Television film
2023	To All a Good Night	Penny	Television film
2024	Fire Country	Rita Rajdev	Episode: "A Hail Mary"
2024	This Time Each Year	Kimmy	Television film
2024	Earth Abides	Molly	Miniseries, 4 episodes
2025	Christmas at the Catnip Café	Abby	Television film
2026	Tracker	Janie Martell	Episode: Do No Harm

=== Video games ===
Year	Title	Role	Notes
2018	Far Cry 5	Deputy Joey Hudson	Voice role

== Awards and nominations ==
Year	Award	Category	Nominated work	Result	Ref.
2014	UBCP Award	Best Actress	Cracked	Nominated	
2016	Leo Awards	Best Guest Performance by a Female in a Dramatic Series	Motive	Nominated	
2023	Leo Awards	Best Lead Performance By a Female in a Television Movie	The Surrogate Scandal	Nominated	
