= Akiyoshi Nakao =

Japanese actor (born 1988)

- 中尾 明慶
- Nakao in 2025
- Born: 30 June 1988 (age 38); Nakano, Tokyo, Japan
- Occupation: Actor
- Years active: 2000–present
- Agent: Horipro
- Spouse: Riisa Naka (m. 2013)
- Children: 1

Akiyoshi Nakao (中尾 明慶, Nakao Akiyoshi; born 30 June 1988, in Nakano, Tokyo, Japan) is a Japanese actor.

Nakao's wife is actress Riisa Naka, his co-star in Time Traveller: The Girl Who Leapt Through Time.

== Filmography ==
=== Television ===
Year	Title	Role	Notes	Ref.
2001	Kinpachi-sensei	Takayuki "Chu" Yamagoshi	Season 6	
2005–21	Dragon Sakura	Ichiro Okuno	2 seasons	
2008	Rookies	Hidenori Sekikawa		
2010	Wagaya no Rekishi	Hideo Murata	Miniseries	
2014	Gunshi Kanbei	Toyotomi Hidetsugu	Taiga drama	
2016	Chūshingura no Koi: Shitoya Hitome no chūshin	Muramatsu Takanao		
2018	Jimmy: Aho mitaina Honma no Hanashi	Jimmy Onishi	Lead role	
2021	Okehazama	Kinoshita Tōkichirō	Television film	
2022	First Love			

=== Films ===
Year	Title	Role	Notes	Ref.
2010	Time Traveller: The Girl Who Leapt Through Time	Ryota Mizorogi		
2010	Colorful	Misturu Kobayashi (voice)		
2016	Samurai Hustle	Gokuzo Mori		
2018	Color Me True	Shintaro Yamanaka		
2019	Shadowfall	Makoto		
2020	Phantomirage Movie Version: We've Become a Movie	Piyoshi Kurosawa		
2021	Character	Makoto Ōmura		
2022	Wedding High	Shinji Sōma		
2023	And So I'm at a Loss	Shinji		
2024	Oi Handsome!!	Mysterious Man		

== Bibliography ==
=== Photo albums ===
Year	Title	Book code
2005	Thanks	ISBN 439113117X

=== Novels ===
Year	Title	Ref.
2016	Yōsei	
