= Kurozuka (novel) =

Japanese novel by Baku Yumemakura

- Cover of the novel

黒塚
- Genre: Post-apocalyptic; Romance; Supernatural
- Novel
- Written by: Baku Yumemakura
- Published by: Shueisha
- Published: August 25, 2000
- Manga
- Written by: Baku Yumemakura
- Illustrated by: Takashi Noguchi
- Published by: Shueisha
- Imprint: Jump Comics Deluxe
- Magazine: Oh Super Jump
- Original run: July 18, 2002 – October 18, 2006
- Volumes: 10
- Anime television series
- Directed by: Tetsurō Araki
- Produced by: Tarō Morishima
- Written by: Yoshinobu Fujioka; Tsutomu Shirado; Tetsuro Araki
- Music by: Kiyoshi Yoshida
- Studio: Madhouse
- Licensed by: Sony Pictures Television
- Original network: Animax, BS11
- Original run: October 7, 2008 – December 23, 2008
- Episodes: 12
- icon

Kurozuka (黒塚) is a Japanese novel written by Baku Yumemakura, published by Shueisha in August 2000. A manga adaptation by Takashi Noguchi was serialized in Shueisha's seinen manga magazine Oh Super Jump from July 2002 to October 2006, with its chapters collected in ten tankōbon volumes. A 12-episode anime adaptation by Madhouse was broadcast on Animax from October to December 2008.

== Plot ==
The series begins in 12th century Japan and centers on Kuro, a character based loosely on the legendary Japanese swordsman Minamoto no Yoshitsune. Kuro and his servant, Benkei, meet a beautiful and mysterious woman named Kuromitsu while on the run from Kuro's elder brother, who seeks his life. Kuromitsu and Kuro fall in love, but he soon discovers that she harbors a terrible secret: she is a vampiric immortal. Following an attack by his pursuers, Kuro is badly injured and must imbibe Kuromitsu's blood to save his own life. Kuro is then betrayed and attacked by Benkei, who has been subverted by a shadowy organization called the Red Army, and Kuro's head is severed, which interferes with his transformation into a fully immortal being.

Kuro loses consciousness and wakes up centuries later in a post-apocalyptic, dystopian Japan with his memories of the past century missing. The surviving citizens have fallen under constant oppression by the Red Army, and Kuro is quickly found and recruited by an underground revolutionary movement called Haniwa. The remaining episodes follow Kuro's fight with the Red Army and its host of elite warriors, who have been hunting Kuromitsu for her blood, believing it contains the secret to eternal life; focusing on Kuro's quest to find his inexplicably lost love.

In the first few episodes, the story shows Kuro's memories of travelling through the centuries with Kuromitsu with gaps in the recollection indicating lapses in his memory. The recollections show the past up until Kuromitsu goes missing.

== Characters ==
Kuro (クロウ)
Voiced by: Mamoru Miyano (Japanese); Brad Swaile (English)
Kuromitsu (黒蜜)
Voiced by: Romi Park (Japanese); Janyse Jaud (English)
Benkei (弁慶)
Voiced by: Jouji Nakata (Japanese); Paul Dobson (English)
Karuta (歌留多)
Voiced by: Keiji Fujiwara (Japanese); Trevor Devall (English)
Kuon (久遠)
Voiced by: Miyu Irino (Japanese); Samuel Vincent, Adrian Petriw (Kuon Prime) (English)
Izana (居座魚)
Voiced by: Kazuhiko Inoue (Japanese); Michael Dobson (English)
Saniwa (沙仁輪)
Voiced by: Toshiko Fujita (Japanese); Cathy Weseluck (English)
Kurumasou (車僧)
Voiced by: Banjō Ginga (Japanese); Don Brown (English)
Rai (ライ)
Voiced by: Houko Kuwashima (Japanese); Kelly Sheridan (English)
Kagetsu (花月)
Voiced by: Kaori Yamagata (Japanese); Nicole Oliver (English)
Tonba (トンバ)
Voiced by: Ken Uo (Japanese); Jason Simpson (English)
Hasegawa (長谷川)
Voiced by: Tōru Ōkawa (Japanese); Kirby Morrow (English)
Arashiyama (嵐山)
Voiced by: Shin-ichiro Miki (Japanese); Michael Adamthwaite (English)
Man in Black (黒づくめの男)
Voiced by: Junpei Takiguchi (Japanese); Trevor Devall (English)

== Media ==
=== Novel ===
Written by Baku Yumemakura, the Kurozuka novel was published Shueisha on August 25, 2000. Shueisha republished it in bunkoban format on February 20, 2003, and in digital format on November 1, 2013.

=== Manga ===
A manga adaptation by Takashi Noguchi was serialized in Shueisha's seinen manga magazine Oh Super Jump from July 18, 2002, to October 18, 2006. (Note: It was serialized in the magazine from the August 2002 to the November 2006 issue, released on July 18, 2002, and October 18, 2006, respectively.) Shueisha collected its chapters in ten tankōbon volumes, released from January 6, 2003, to December 4, 2006.

=== Anime ===
A 12-episode anime television series adaptation was produced by Madhouse and directed by Tetsurō Araki, with Yoshinobu Fujioka, Tsutomu Shirado and Araki himself handling series composition, Masanori Shino designing the characters and Kiyoshi Yoshida composing the music. It was broadcast on Animax and BS11 from October 7 to December 23, 2008. The opening song is "Systematic People", performed by Wagdug Futuristic Unity featuring Maximum the Ryo-kun (Maximum the Hormone), while the ending theme is "Hanarebanare" (ハナレバナレ), performed by Shigi.

An English dub began streaming in the United States on Crackle in January 2012 and the series was released on DVD by Sony Pictures Home Entertainment on December 4 of that same year.

==== Episodes ====
No.	Title	Directed by	Written by	Original release date
1	"Adachigahara" (Japanese: 安達原)	Miho Hirao	Yoshinobu Fujioka	October 7, 2008
Kuro and Benkei, fleeing pursuers, seek refuge in the forest home of Kuromitsu. When Kuro falls ill, Benkei leaves to seek medicine. The pursuers attack Kuro and Kuromitsu, mortally wounding Kuro. Kuromitsu offers Kuro eternal life.
2	"The Tomb of Karma"; Transliteration: "Innen-zuka" (Japanese: 因縁塚)	Yūji Kumasawa	Kengo Kaji	October 14, 2008
A corrupt wandering samurai attacks Kuro and Kuromitsu in the town near her home and beheads Kuro. Kuromitsu kills the samurai and attaches Kuro's head to the samurai's body. In flashback, Kuro drinks Kuromitsu's blood, but before his transformation can complete, they are attacked by an enemy who has been hunting Kuromitsu for the secret to her immortality. Kuro is beheaded by Benkei, whom the enemy had recruited to be their new leader.
3	"Asuka" (Japanese: 明日香)	Tomohiko Itō	Tsutomu Shirado	October 21, 2008
Without any memory of how he got there, Kuro awakens in the forest in a post-apocalyptic world. Upon entering a crumbled city of Asuka in search of Kuromitsu, he meets Haniwa resistance member Karuta. The Red Imperial Army attacks the club fronting for the Haniwa HQ. Kuro attacks the Red Imperial Army when he recognizes their emblem as the same as those who hunted Kuromitsu.
4	"Haniwa Man"; Transliteration: "Haniwa-jin" (Japanese: 埴輪人)	Shinichi Masaki	Osamu Morikawa	October 28, 2008
Kuro recovers from the fight with the Red Imperial Army at Rai's apartment. Rai takes Kuro to Izana, who claims he can reunite Kuro with Kuromitsu if Kuro joins the Haniwa rebels against the Red Imperial Army.
5	"Saniwa" (Japanese: 沙仁輪)	Ho Pyeon-gang	Tsutomu Shirado	November 4, 2008
The Haniwa take Kuro to meet the rebel leader, Saniwa. She promises to reunite him with Kuromitsu. The Red Imperial Army seeks Kuromitsu's blood to breed an army of enhanced soldiers.
6	"Al-Qadr"; Transliteration: "Miitsu" (Japanese: 御稜威)	Oyunamu; Miho Hirao	Tsutomu Shirado	November 11, 2008
Arashiyama and the Red Imperial Army attack Haniwa HQ and Saniwa's residence in search of Kuromitsu's blood.
7	"Kagura Village"; Transliteration: "Kagura-mura" (Japanese: 神楽村)	Yūsuke Onoda; Naoyasu Habu	Osamu Morikawa	November 18, 2008
Kuro and the Haniwa travel to the underground village of Kagura, but discover the residents slaughtered and Kuromitsu gone.
8	"The Ghost-Weep Vine"; Transliteration: "Kikoku-tsuta" (Japanese: 鬼哭蔦)	Shinichi Masaki	Kengo Kaji	November 25, 2008
The Red Imperial sorceress Kagetsu tortures Saniwa to learn the whereabouts of Kuromitsu. Kuromitsu appears, kills Kagetsu, tells Kuro to go to the Red Imperial HQ, and disappears again. Saniwa dies.
9	"Running the Gauntlet"; Transliteration: "Sōfūka" (Japanese: 走風火)	Takayuki Hirao	Yoshinobu Fujioka	December 2, 2008
Kuro and the Haniwa travel to the Red Imperial HQ in Tokyo. Karuta dies.
10	"The Castle of Mirage"; Transliteration: "Genei-jou" (Japanese: 幻影城)	Masato Kitagawa	Kengo Kaji	December 9, 2008
Kuro and Rai are captured by the Red Imperial Army. Kuon is revealed to be, among other things, a Red Imperial agent who infiltrated the Haniwa at Kuromitsu's command.
11	"The Unending War"; Transliteration: "Ikusa Rinne" (Japanese: 戦輪廻)	Yasushi Muroya	Kengo Kaji	December 16, 2008
Hasegawa plans to remove Kuro's head for his experiments. Kuro kills Hasegawa. Kuon kills Rai, then tells Kuro that Kuromitsu planned to use his body as Kuro's perfect new body. Kuro kills Kuon.
12	"The Black Tomb"; Transliteration: "Kuro no Tsuka" (Japanese: 黒の塚)	Tetsurō Araki	Tsutomu Shirado	December 23, 2008
Kuro confronts the Red Emperor, who is revealed to be Benkei, and kills him. Kuromitsu beheads Kuro and places his head on a new body. Kuro awakens in the forest, having lost his memory, and begins again his search for Kuromitsu.
