= The Japanese the Japanese Don't Know =

Japanese manga series

- The Japanese The Japanese Don't Know

日本人の知らない日本語 (Nihonjin no Shiranai Nihongo)
- Manga
- Written by: Takayuki Tomita and Umino Nagiko
- Published by: Media Factory
- Original run: 2009 – present
- Volumes: 4
- Television drama
- Written by: Yoshihiro Izumi
- Original network: Yomiuri Telecasting Corporation
- Original run: 7/15/2010 – 9/30/2010
- Episodes: 12

The Japanese That The Japanese Don't Know (Japanese: 日本人の知らない日本語, Hepburn: Nihonjin no Shiranai Nihongo) is a manga and television series about a Japanese teacher and her students written by Takayuki Tomita and Umino Nagiko. It discusses the background of Japanese words and speech. There have been four paperback volumes as of August, 2013. It has also spawned a live action drama which aired on Yomiuri TV.

== Summary ==
The Japanese That The Japanese Don't Know is an episodic series revolving around elements of the Japanese language such as word origins and proper uses. This is backed by a story of a Japanese teacher at a Japanese language school who frequently gets involved in scenarios with her eccentric students.

== Books ==
No.	Title	Release date	ISBN
1	Nihonjin no Shiranai Nihongo (日本人の知らない日本語)	February 20, 2009	978-4-8401-2673-1
2	Nihonjin no Shiranai Nihongo 2: Bakushō! Nihongo "Saihakkken" Komikku Essei (日本人の知らない日本語 2 爆笑！ 日本語「再発見」コミックエッセイ)	February 19, 2010	978-4-8401-3194-0
3	Nihonjin no Shiranai Nihongo 3: Iwai! Sotsugyō-hen (日本人の知らない日本語 3 祝！卒業編)	March 9, 2012	978-4-8401-4354-7
4	Nihonjin no Shiranai Nihongo 4: Kaigai-hen (日本人の知らない日本語 4 海外編)	August 2, 2013	978-4-8401-5268-6

Outside of Japan, it has been published in the Korean language from the original source material in the Republic of Korea. In addition, it has also been published in Traditional Chinese in the Republic of China.

== TV drama ==
From July 15, 2010, until September 30, every Thursday night, the TV drama The Japanese That The Japanese Don't Know aired on Yomiuri TV (every Thursday from 23:58 until 24:38).

Whilst the drama version is based on the original comics, the main character Haruko has been involved in more problems with the teachers and students than in the comics.

=== Synopsis ===
Haruko Kano (Riisa Naka) meets an old high school teacher who suggests that Haruko would make a good Japanese language teacher and offers to help her get a job at a public school. However, he asks that Haruko works at a private school for three months before working at a public school. He gives her a textbook which is for elementary school students.

However, when Haruko shows up on her first day as a Japanese language teacher she discovers that the school is for foreign students learning Japanese. Her students ask her questions about her own (Japanese) language that makes Haruko realize that she doesn't even fully understand her native language.
