= Big Fish & Begonia =

- Theatrical release poster
- Traditional Chinese: 大魚海棠
- Simplified Chinese: 大鱼海棠
- Literal meaning: The big fish and the Chinese flowering crabapple
- Hanyu Pinyin: Dàyú Hǎitáng
- Jyutping: Daai^{6}jyu^{4} Hoi^{2}tong^{4}
- Directed by: Liang Xuan; Zhang Chun
- Written by: Liang Xuan
- Starring: Ji Guanlin; Su Shangqing; Timmy Xu; Chin Shih-chieh; Yang Ting; Pan Shulan
- Edited by: Tu Yiran
- Music by: Kiyoshi Yoshida
- Production companies: Horgos Coloroom Pictures; Beijing Enlight Media; Biantian (Beijing) Media; Studio Mir
- Distributed by: Beijing Enlight Media
- Release date: 8 July 2016
- Running time: 105 minutes
- Country: China
- Language: Mandarin
- Budget: CN¥30 million
- Box office: US$85.7 million

Big Fish & Begonia (simplified Chinese: 大鱼海棠; traditional Chinese: 大魚海棠; pinyin: Dàyú Hǎitáng; Wade–Giles: Ta^{4}yü^{2} Hai^{3}tʻang^{2}; lit. 'The big fish and the Chinese flowering crabapple') is a 2016 Chinese animated epic fantasy film written, produced and directed by Liang Xuan and Zhang Chun. The first animated feature film of B&T Studio collaborating with Studio Mir, it is a joint investment by B&T and Enlight Media. It was released in both 2D and 3D formats in China by Enlight Media on 8 July 2016.

Shout! Studios acquired the North American distribution rights, with a wide release on 6 April 2018 in co-distribution with Funimation Films. Manga Entertainment released the film in the United Kingdom and Ireland on 18 April 2018.

== Plot ==
In a mystical realm that exists beneath the human world, populated by magical-powered beings, a girl named Chun participates in a coming-of-age ritual where she is transported through a portal of water to experience the human world in the form of a red dolphin for one week. She encounters a human boy who lives by the sea and reveres aquatic creatures. During a storm, Chun is tangled in a fishing net and the boy drowns while saving her. Chun returns to her world, taking the boy's ocarina with her.

Chun bargains with the Soul Keeper, a resident of her world who collects virtuous departed souls from the human world, to return the boy to life. The Soul Keeper takes half of her lifespan in exchange for giving her the boy's soul, which has manifested in her world in the form of a baby dolphin. She advises her that she must nurture the dolphin to adulthood in order to return the boy's soul to the human world. Qiu, Chun's childhood friend, helps her, since beings from the human world are forbidden. Together, they name the dolphin Kun, after a massive fish of legend.

Chun's mother finds Kun and throws him into the sewer. While searching for Kun, Chun and Qiu meet the rat matron, who collects the souls of sinners from the human world, which manifest in the form of rats. She takes an interest in the dolphin and summons her rats to recover him from the sewer. Chun and Qiu manage to take Kun before he is discovered by the villagers. In their search for a new home, Qiu is bitten by a two-headed snake. Chun's grandfather draws the venom into his own body to save Qiu's life. Before dying, he says he will support her even in death. His soul manifests in the form of a begonia tree.

As Chun's world begins to experience unnatural torrential rains and snowfall, her family and the local elders realize that Kun's continued presence has caused these phenomena. One night, Qiu receives warning from the rat matron to hide Kun. He puts Kun in a frozen lake to save Chun from further persecution, but Chun dives in after Kun. The rat matron summons her rats to recover Chun and Kun from the icy water, and takes the ocarina from Chun, planning to use it to secure her own passage to the human world.

Qiu visits the Soul Keeper to bargain his own life for the return of Chun's. The Soul Keeper demands his entire lifespan as payment, while warning that Chun will die regardless when Kun returns to the human world. The Soul Keeper reveals to Qiu how to save Chun from this fate. The residents of Chun's world gather to kill Kun and avert further calamity. Qiu performs the ritual to open a portal to the human world, but Kun is unable to swim through it, while the rat matron uses the ocarina to pass through the portal. Holes in the sky begin to open, flooding Chun's world with sea water from the human world.

Chun is reminded that her actions to save Kun are dooming the people of her own world; she is spurned by all, including her mother. As a last resort, Chun sacrifices herself, merging her body with her grandfather's begonia tree to grow it to colossal proportions, plugging the holes in the sky and saving everyone from the flood.

Kun breaks a branch off the begonia tree and brings it to the Soul Keeper, who restores Chun to life from it. She sets her on a pilgrimage to return Kun to his world. Qiu, overwhelmed with regret in knowing they are spending their last night together, is unable to express his feelings for her.

The next day, Chun bids Kun farewell as Qiu opens one last portal for his return. Qiu, following the Soul Keeper's instructions, casts a spell that will send Chun to the human world while killing him by setting him on magical fire. As Qiu burns away, he tells Chun that he'll be with her always. Chun is transformed into a red dolphin, allowing her to follow Kun through the portal.

On a seashore in the human world, Kun and Chun wash ashore in their human forms. As Kun regains consciousness, he sees Chun holding out her hand to him. In a mid-credits scene, the Soul Keeper restores Qiu to life from his ashes and declares Qiu her successor, revealing the true cost of Qiu's sacrifice for Chun.

== Voice cast ==
Character	Mandarin	English
Chun (椿)	Ji Guanlin (Original) Pan Shulan (Old)	Stephanie Sheh (Original) Sung Fong (Old)
Qiu (湫)	Su Shangqing	Johnny Yong Bosch
Kun (鲲)	Timmy Xu	Todd Haberkorn
Lingpo (靈婆)	Chin Shih-chieh	John White
Shu Pozi (鼠婆子)	Yang Ting	Cindy Robinson
Feng (凤)	Zhang Yuanyuan	Goddess Wu
Houtu (后土); Chun's grandfather (椿的爷爷)	Wang Deshun	Greg Chun
Shu (樹)	Xue Lifang	Greg Chun
Chisong Zi (赤松子)	Zhang Jie	Greg Chun
Leizu (嫘祖)	Liu Xiaoyu	Erika Ishii
Goumang (句芒)	Baomu Zhongyang	Yuri Lowenthal
Tingmu (廷牧)	Cheng Yu	Yuri Lowenthal
Kun's little sister (鲲妹)	Jiur	Cassandra Morris

== Development ==
The film is directed by Liang Xuan and Zhang Chun. The story was inspired by a myth from the ancient Chinese Taoist classic Zhuangzi. The film also integrates many stories from other Chinese classics such as Classic of Mountains and Seas and In Search of the Supernatural. According to the movie director, "our dream is to make a heart-touching animation film, which will bring teenagers power of love and faith."

Liang Xuan and Zhang Chun spent many difficult years together working on the project. The origins of this film started when they produced a short Flash animation, titled Big Fish & Chinese Flowering Crabapple, that was published online in May 2004. After that animation was well-received, Zhang and Liang decided to develop it into a feature-length film, forming Biantian (Beijing) Media Co., Ltd on March 3, 2005. However, they had trouble funding the film until 2007, when a small amount of money finally came in.

The two immersed themselves in the project, finishing the script in 2009, but the funding quickly ran out. Despite the fact that many investors were interested in the fantasy world of the film, no one believed that such a film could be a financial success. The project was filed away for several years until Liang posted on Weibo in June 2013, asking for help, and to spread the word about the film.

Many animation fans have called it "the dawn of the Chinese animation industry" and voted it as the "most anticipated animated film." The quality of the 7-minute clip, the great amount of the interest and later the great success of another top-grossing Chinese animated feature, Monkey King: Hero is Back, were the factors that prompted Enlight Media to invest in the project.

== Soundtrack ==
All compositions by Kiyoshi Yoshida.

Soundtrack of Big Fish & Begonia

Studio album by Kiyoshi Yoshida
- Released: 2016
- Genre: Soundtrack
- Length: 85 minutes
- Producer: Kiyoshi Yoshida

Soundtrack
No.	Title	Length
1.	"Opening"	03:28
2.	"Horse Riding, Before Ceremony"	01:20
3.	"Ceremony"	02:32
4.	"Ceremony Climax"	00:53
5.	"Encounter Human World"	01:40
6.	"Vigor Kun"	01:38
7.	"Chun's Crisis"	00:57
8.	"Kun's Accident"	01:33
9.	"Kun's Death"	01:19
10.	"Old Man's Enlightenment"	01:10
11.	"Chun's Awakening"	02:18
12.	"Chun's Decision"	01:02
13.	"Coming Boat"	00:37
14.	"To Soul Madam's Palace"	01:07
15.	"Deal With Soul Madam"	04:46
16.	"Godmother Chun's Dream"	02:17
17.	"Chun & Kun's Pleasure Time"	00:59
18.	"Kun's Growing Process"	00:20
19.	"Rat Madam's Appearance"	00:36
20.	"Rat Madam's Dance"	00:39
21.	"Fight Against Big Snake"	00:58
22.	"Dying Old Man"	00:25
23.	"Old Man's Last Words"	02:23
24.	"Growing Crabapple Tree"	01:17
25.	"Qiu Carry Chun & Kun"	01:22
26.	"Chun's Dream"	03:07
27.	"Qiu Deals With Soul Madam"	02:36
28.	"Qiu's Distress"	05:21
29.	"Brave Qiu"	01:54
30.	"Drifting Chun & Kun"	02:12
31.	"Escaping Chun & Kun"	03:00
32.	"Chun's Destress And Big Crabapple"	05:06
33.	"Wandering Kun"	01:15
34.	"Rebirth"	01:32
35.	"Great Journey"	07:27
36.	"Last Separation"	03:46
37.	"Birth"	05:16
38.	"Qiu's Rebirth"	04:50

== Reception ==
=== Box office ===
The film grossed CN¥565 million in China.

=== Critical reception ===
On review aggregator website Rotten Tomatoes, the film holds an approval rating of 91%, based on 32 reviews, and an average rating of 7.2/10. The website's critical consensus reads, "Big Fish & Begonia's richly rendered blend of animation styles perfectly complements its bighearted, surprisingly complex cautionary fish tale." On Metacritic, the film has a weighted average score of 72 out of 100, based on 10 critics, indicating "generally favorable reviews".
