= Storm Seekers =

- DVD Cover
- Directed by: George Mendeluk
- Written by: Kyle Hart
- Produced by: Kirk Shaw
- Starring: Daryl Hannah; Dylan Neal; Barclay Hope; Gwynyth Walsh; Terry Chen; Mackenzie Gray
- Cinematography: Anthony C. Metchie
- Edited by: Tony Kent
- Music by: Peter Allen
- Production companies: Ignite Entertainment; Johnson Production Group; Insight Film Studios
- Distributed by: ITV Global Entertainment
- Release date: April 5, 2009; (theatrical)
- Running time: 84 minutes
- Countries: United States; Canada
- Language: English

Storm Seekers (also known as Hurricane Hunter) is a 2009 American/Canadian made-for-television action / drama film directed by George Mendeluk and starring Daryl Hannah, Dylan Neal, Barclay Hope, Gwynyth Walsh, Terry Chen and Mackenzie Gray. The supporting cast includes Sean Bell and William MacDonald. The story is based on the missions of hurricane hunters who locate and track hurricanes. (Note: Storm Seekers dealt with global warming with a sceptical media reporter spouting the popular notions of climate change denial confronting a scientist.)

== Plot ==
Meteorologist Leah Kaplan and her team of National Storm Center (NSC) scientists set out from Jacksonville, Florida on a routine tracking mission to gather data on Hurricane Josephine, forming up over the Atlantic Ocean. Along with Leah, technician Tommy Cramer and meteorologist Steve Pastor have been joined by a reporter, Ryan Stewart gathering information on a feature article on the hurricane hunters. Both Leah and Tommy worry that Steve, recently furloughed because of a drinking problem, will be unreliable. Ryan also is an unnecessary complication to the flight as he continually probes for details about the mission and Leah's background and motivation.

Leah reports back to her supervisor Eli Harder who is involved with a full-scale evacuation of Corpus Christi, Texas called by NSC Director James McCaffee, due to the proximity of Hurricane Ike. As Hurricane Hunters Flight 263 enters the hurricane outer wall at 1,500 ft where the winds and turbulence are at their greatest intensity, the data that is being returned from the launching of dropsondes indicates that the hurricane is gathering strength. Relaying the message back to headquarters does not bring an immediate response as the Director worries that Leah's past background in losing her parents in Hurricane Edna has clouded her judgment, a concern that Leah's psychiatrist Dr. Johnson has been exploring.

The sudden pitching and turbulence pitches Steve headfirst into his control console, precipitating a fatal heart attack. For a brief period in the eye of the hurricane, Leah, Ryan and Tommy are able to deal with Steve's death. Leah again tries to alert the NSC that Hurricane Josephine has shifted and is headed directly to Jacksonville. Announcing a second evacuation is problematic, the NSC Director, despite Eli's pleas to look at the data Leah is sending, refuses to change the evacuation plans already in progress.

The violent storm suddenly turns into a level 5 hurricane with winds at over 250 mph (400 km/h) battering Flight 263. Captain Henry Gersh and co-pilot Ben Tillner on his first hurricane hunters flight, wrestle the aircraft through a climb that abruptly turns into an out-of-control dive to wavetop heights. After a fire in one of the engines is doused by the violent rain storm outside, electrical systems begin shorting out, with both Henry and Tommy blinded by the sparking equipment. Leah is abruptly hurled into the ceiling as the aircraft enters a parabolic maneuver. Turbulence increases with the rear exit door torn off, and the sudden depressurization sucks both Leah and Tommy out of the aircraft. Caught in the cargo netting, Leah is still alive but badly hurt. Ryan reacts quickly to haul Leah back inside, with the two crawling their way to the cockpit for safety. Leah has a dislocated shoulder that Ryan attempts to reset but with Henry blinded, she convinces Ryan that he has to help Ben fly the crippled aircraft.

Receiving Flight 263's mayday distress message and on the ground reports of the hurricane already battering the coast, Eli finally convinces the Director that Hurricane Josephine is the greater danger. Ben and Ryan manage to bring the aircraft down safely at Jacksonville, and as Henry and Leah are brought out by emergency crews, all the surviving members of the flight find out that their loved ones are safe.

== Cast ==
- Daryl Hannah as Leah Kaplan
- Dylan Neal as Ryan Stewart
- Barclay Hope as Captain Henry Gersh
- Gwynyth Walsh as Dr. Johnson
- Terry Chen as Tommy Cramer
- Mackenzie Gray as Director James McCaffee
- Sean Bell as Steve Pastor
- William MacDonald as Eli Harder
- Chad Cole as Ben Tillner
- Jocelyne Loewen as Melissa (credited as Jocelyn Loewen)
- Luisa D'Oliveira as Paloma
- Emily Hirst as Sarah Stewart
- Megan Charpentier as Young Leah
- Christine Chatelain as Jessica Tillner
- Michael Strusievici as Parker Pastor
- Olivia Rameau as Nurse Maddie
- Dean Redman as Cop
- Keith Martin Gordey as Senator Maddock
- Tosha Doiron as Parker's mother
- Susan Milne as young Leah's mother
- Stephen Boersma as Zach

== Production ==
A combination of CGI and full-scale aircraft scenes were used in Storm Seekers.

Principal photography under the working title of Hurricane Hunter took place in 2008 with location shooting at Maple Ridge and Vancouver, British Columbia. One of the important elements was in the use of a Nolinor Aviation Convair 580, tail number C-FTAP. The aircraft appeared as a "hurricane hunter", with its interior modified to accommodate computer and radar monitoring equipment. Besides the use of a full-scale aircraft, many of the flying scenes were made through computer-generated imagery (CGI).

== Reception ==
Storm Seekers was, at best B film "potboiler" fare, but whose topic was not only timely but also appeared at a time when networks were looking for material to fill newly emerging broadcast channels. Well over a dozen network premieres took place across Europe, Asia and North America. The film was released in 2010 for home media. Eveliene Sanders in a review for Cinemagazine in The Netherlands, reviewed Storm Seekers as an example of a disaster film where a disparate group of characters are faced with a dilemma. She considered it, however, "... too ordinary and predictable."
