= Kiyoshi Yoshida =

Japanese composer

Kiyoshi Yoshida 吉田 潔
- Born: 1964 (age 61–62)
- Genres: Anison
- Occupation: Composer
- Instrument: Keyboards
- Years active: 2000–present
- Label: Pacific Moon
- Member of: Ubud
- Website: kiyoshiyoshida.simdif.com

Kiyoshi Yoshida (吉田 潔, Yoshida Kiyoshi; born 1964) is a Japanese composer. His compositions include the music from the film The Girl Who Leapt Through Time and anime series Kaiba, Kurozuka, and Shigurui: Death Frenzy. He also composed the soundtrack for the NHK special programs New Silk Road 2007 and Nihonjinn Harukana tabi. He is a member of the band Ubud.

== Discography ==
Albums

- Asian Drums (Pacific Moon, 2000)
- Asian Drums II (Pacific Moon, 2001)
- Matsuri (Pacific Moon, 2007)
- Journey to the East Edo (Pacific Moon, 2010), with Bonten, Yoshida's contributions were taken from Asian Drums and Asian Drums II.
- Warriors – Kiyoshi Yoshida feat. Yukihiko Mitsuka (Pacific Moon, 2012)

== Filmography ==
List of production work
| Year | Title | Crew role | Notes | Source |
|---|---|---|---|---|
| 2006 | The Girl Who Leapt Through Time | Music | 2006 film | |
| 2007 | Shigurui | Music | | |
| 2008 | Kaiba | Music | | |
| 2008 | Kurozuka | Music | | |
| 2016 | Big Fish & Begonia | Music | Chinese animation film | |
