= Zebraman 2: Attack on Zebra City =

2010 Japanese superhero film

- Film poster

Japanese name
- Kanji: ゼブラーマン -ゼブラシティの逆襲-
Transcriptions
- Revised Hepburn: Zeburāman -Zebura Shiti no Gyakushū-
- Directed by: Takashi Miike
- Written by: Kankurō Kudō
- Produced by: Akio Hattori; Takashi Hirano; Arimasa Okada; Makoto Okada
- Starring: Show Aikawa; Riisa Naka; Tsuyoshi Abe; Masahiro Inoue; Naoki Tanaka; Guadalcanal Taka
- Cinematography: Kazushige Tanaka
- Edited by: Kenji Yamashita
- Music by: Yoshihiro Ike
- Distributed by: Toei
- Release date: May 1, 2010
- Running time: 106 minutes
- Country: Japan
- Language: Japanese
- Box office: $1,270,219

Zebraman 2: Attack on Zebra City (ゼブラーマン -ゼブラシティの逆襲-, Zeburāman -Zebura Shitî no Gyakushū-) is the 2010 sequel to the 2004 film Zebraman. The film features Show Aikawa reprising his leading role from the original, and also stars Riisa Naka and Masahiro Inoue. The film's tagline is "Let's get ready to fight!" (白黒つけるぜ！, Shirokuro tsukeru ze!; a pun as it contains the kanji for "white" (白, shiro) and "black" (黒, kuro)). The film did poorly in Japanese box offices, which may be due to the film's theme of a religious war with the antagonists portrayed as analogies of the Happy Science movement in Japan.

On November 29, 2011, Funimation released the film in the United States. The contents of the Blu-ray/DVD Combo Pack contains movie in Japanese with English subtitles. The Blu-ray/DVD Combo Pack contains Special Features and making-ofs.

== Plot ==
By 2025, fifteen years after the events of Zebraman, Aihara Kozou has been elected governor of Tokyo, which then renamed itself Zebra City. It instituted "Zebra Time", a 5-minute period starting at 5:00 AM/PM during which all crime is legal and the government allows the Zebra Police to attack any and all presumed criminals. Once Zebra Time results in the attempted murder of Shinichi Ichikawa, also known as Zebraman. Shinichi, surviving the attack but having lost his memories, teams up with Shinpei (now a doctor) to save a mysterious little girl from Aihara Kouzou, Zebra Queen and her Zebra Police, and then the world from their ultimate plan to use the strange aliens from 2010 to bring Zebra Time to the whole world.

== Cast ==
- Show Aikawa as Shinichi Ichikawa/Zebraman
- Riisa Naka as Yui Aihara/Zebra Queen/Zebrawoman/Black Zebra
- Tsuyoshi Abe as Niimi
- Masahiro Inoue as Shinpei Asano
- Naoki Tanaka as Junpei Ichiba
- Guadalcanal Taka as Kozou Aihara
- Mei Nagano as Sumire
- Nana Mizuki as the Alien Voice
- Miki Inase as Yumi Kisaragi/Zebra Mini-Skirt Police
- Sayoko Ohashi as Risako Yuki/Zebra Mini-Skirt Police
- Yuko Shimizu as Yu Maki/Zebra Mini-Skirt Police
- Suzanne as Mika Misaki
- Kazuki Namioka as Clothing Designer
- Houka Kinoshita as Turtle Who Attacks Aihara
- Hideo Nakano as Boar Man
- Naomasa Musaka as Surgeon
- Ken Maeda as Legislator
- Katsuhisa Namase as TV Reporter
- Mame Yamada as Miho Kishida

== Theme song ==
For the film, Riisa Naka as the Zebra Queen released a single titled "Namida (Kokoro Abaite)" (NAMIDA～ココロアバイテ～; "Tears (Through His Heart)") on April 21, 2010, to serve as the film's theme song. A music video was also released featuring Naka in the character of Zebra Queen singing the song. A music video was also recorded for the other song included on the single, "Zebra Queen's Theme" (ゼブラクイーンのテーマ, Zebura Kuīn no Tēma), which is also used in the film's trailers. For the music videos and all performances of the song, Riisa has stated Zebra Queen has a Lady Gaga-like persona.

== V-Cinema ==
A direct to video movie called Vengeful Zebra Mini-Skirt Police (ゼブラミニスカポリスの逆襲, Zebura Minisuka Porisu no Gyakushū) was released on April 19, 2010, to promote the upcoming release of Zebraman 2. The story is set in 2024, one year before the events of the sequel, and focuses on the characters of the Zebra Mini-Skirt Police. The film also features Suzu Natsume as Sayuri Yuki, Shinji Kasahara as a rebel, Yasukaze Motomiya as Ogata, and Guadalcanal Taka as Kozou Aihara.
