= Memory (2006 film) =

2006 American film directed by Bennett Joshua Davlin

- Directed by: Bennett Joshua Davlin
- Written by: Bennett Joshua Davlin; Anthony Badalucco
- Produced by: Bennett Joshua Davlin; Jesse Newhouse; Anthony Badalucco
- Starring: Billy Zane; Tricia Helfer; Dennis Hopper
- Edited by: Allison Grace
- Music by: Clint Bennet; Anthony Marinelli
- Release dates: December 27, 2006 (Argentina); March 23, 2007 (United States)
- Running time: 98 minutes
- Country: United States
- Language: English

Memory (also billed as mem-(o)-re and Memore) is a 2006 American medical-thriller film written and directed by Bennett Joshua Davlin, and starring Dennis Hopper, Ann-Margret, Billy Zane, Tricia Helfer and Terry Chen. Davlin wrote the novel first with the intention of directing and producing the film. He said: "These characters were so real to me that I just knew I had to bring them to the big screen". On the review aggregator website Rotten Tomatoes, 14% of 14 critics' reviews are positive.

== Plot ==
While lecturing in Brazil, Taylor Briggs, an American authority on memory, consults on a patient found deep in the Amazon. While examining the patient, Taylor is accidentally exposed to a substance which unlocks memories that do not belong to him.

== Cast ==
- Billy Zane as Taylor Briggs
- Tricia Helfer as Stephanie Jacobs
- Ann-Margret as Carol Hargrave
- Dennis Hopper as Max Lichtenstein
- Terry Chen as Dr. Deepra Chang
- Dan Pelchat as Spectre
- Emily Hirst as Bonnie McHale
