= The Girl Who Leapt Through Time (2006 film) =

2006 film by Mamoru Hosoda

- Theatrical release poster

Japanese name
- Kanji: 時をかける少女
Transcriptions
- Revised Hepburn: Toki o Kakeru Shōjo
- Directed by: Mamoru Hosoda
- Screenplay by: Satoko Okudera
- Based on: The Girl Who Leapt Through Time by Yasutaka Tsutsui
- Produced by: Takashi Watanabe; Yuichiro Saito
- Starring: Riisa Naka; Takuya Ishida; Mitsutaka Itakura; Sachie Hara
- Cinematography: Yoshihiro Tomita
- Edited by: Shigeru Nishiyama
- Music by: Kiyoshi Yoshida
- Production company: Madhouse
- Distributed by: Kadokawa Herald Pictures
- Release date: July 15, 2006
- Running time: 98 minutes
- Country: Japan
- Language: Japanese
- Box office: ¥300 million (Japan) ₩665 million (South Korea)

The Girl Who Leapt Through Time (時をかける少女, Toki o Kakeru Shōjo) is a 2006 Japanese animated science fiction romance film, directed by Mamoru Hosoda, written by Satoko Okudera, and produced by Madhouse. It is loosely adapted from the 1967 novel of the same name by Yasutaka Tsutsui and shares the basic premise, but with a different story and characters than the novel.

The protagonist is Makoto Konno, a teenage girl who learns the power of time travel from Kazuko Yoshiyama, her aunt and the protagonist to the original story. She begins using the time-leaps frivolously to fix problems, and repeatedly relives the same day in a time loop. Makoto is voiced by Riisa Naka, who would later portray Makoto's cousin, Akari Yoshiyama, the protagonist of the 2010 live-action film Time Traveller: The Girl Who Leapt Through Time, which follows a different story.

The Girl Who Leapt Through Time was released by Kadokawa Herald Pictures on July 15, 2006, and received positive reviews. It won numerous awards, including the Japan Academy Film Prize for Animation of the Year. The English version was licensed and produced by Kadokawa Pictures U.S., with dubbing supplied by Ocean Productions, and released by Bandai Entertainment in 2008 and re-released by Funimation in 2016.

== Plot ==
At Kuranose High School in Tokyo, Japan, 17-year-old Makoto Konno discovers a message written on a blackboard that reads "Time waits for no one" and ends up inadvertently falling onto a walnut-shaped object. On her way to the Tokyo National Museum to meet with her aunt, Kazuko Yoshiyama, she is ejected into a railroad crossing when the brakes on her bicycle fail and hit by an oncoming train, but finds herself transported back in time when she was riding her bicycle right before the accident. After telling Kazuko what happened, she helps Makoto realise she now has the power to literally travel through time via "time-leaping". At first, Makoto uses her powers to deal with problems from earlier such as avoiding being late, achieving perfect grades, avoiding mishaps and even relive a single karaoke session for several hours, but soon discovers her actions can adversely affect others.

Consequently, Makoto uses most of her leaps frivolously to prevent undesirable situations from happening, including an awkward love confession from her best friend, Chiaki Mamiya. Makoto realises she has a numbered tattoo on her arm indicating the limited number of times she can time-leap. Using her remaining time-leaps, Makoto attempts to make things right for everyone. When Chiaki calls Makoto to ask if she has been time-leaping, she uses her final time-leap to prevent Chiaki's call. In the meantime, Makoto's friend Kōsuke Tsuda and his new girlfriend, Kaho Fujitani, borrow her faulty bike. Makoto attempts to stop them, but as she had just used her final leap, she is unable to rescue them from being hit by the train.

A moment later, Chiaki freezes time. Telling Makoto he is from the future, he explains the walnut-shaped object is his time-traveling device, and used it to time-leap hoping to see a painting that Kazuko is restoring, as it has been destroyed in the future. While walking with Makoto in the frozen city, Chiaki explains why he stayed longer in her time than he originally planned. Consequently, he has used his final leap to prevent Kōsuke and Kaho from dying in the train accident and he has stopped time only to explain to Makoto he is unable to return to his own time period, and having broken the rules by revealing his origins and the nature of the item that allowed Makoto to leap through time, Chiaki must leave. Makoto then realises she is in love with him.

True to his words, Chiaki disappears once time resumes. Initially distraught by Chiaki's disappearance, Makoto discovers Chiaki's time-leap inadvertently restored her final time-leap: Chiaki leaped back to the time before Makoto used it. Makoto uses it to safely leap back to the moment right after she originally gained her powers; Chiaki would still have his one remaining time-leap. Recovering the used-up time-travel device, she explains her knowledge of everything as she shows it to Chiaki. Makoto vows to ensure the painting's existence so Chiaki can see it in his era. Before Chiaki departs, he tells Makoto he will be waiting for her in the future. When Kōsuke asks her where Chiaki went, she tells him Chiaki went to study abroad, and has made a decision about her own future.

== Characters ==
Makoto Konno (紺野 真琴, Konno Makoto)
Voiced by: Riisa Naka (Japanese); Emily Hirst (English)
Chiaki Mamiya (間宮 千昭, Mamiya Chiaki)
Voiced by: Takuya Ishida (Japanese); Andrew Francis (English)
Kōsuke Tsuda (津田 功介, Tsuda Kousuke)
Voiced by: Mitsutaka Itakura (Japanese); Alex Zahara (English)
Yuri Hayakawa (早川 友梨, Hayakawa Yuri)
Voiced by: Ayami Kakiuchi (Japanese); Kristie Marsden (English)
Kaho Fujitani (藤谷 果穂, Fujitani Kaho)
Voiced by: Mitsuki Tanimura (Japanese); Natalie Walters (English)
Miyuki Konno (紺野 美雪, Konno Miyuki)
Voiced by: Yuki Sekido (Japanese); Shannon Chan-Kent (English)
Old Lady (おばさん, Obasan)
Voiced by: Keiko Yamamoto (Japanese); Cathy Weseluck (English)
Sojiro Takase (高瀬 宋次郎, Takase Sojiro)
Voiced by: Yōji Matsuda (Japanese); David Hurwitz (English)
Kazuko Yoshiyama (芳山 和子, Yoshiyama Kazuko)
Voiced by: Sachie Hara (Japanese); Saffron Henderson (English)

== Release ==
The Girl Who Leapt Through Time was released to a small number of theatres in Japan, taking in approximately ¥300 million ($3 million). The film received limited advertising as opposed to other animation features, but word of mouth and positive reviews generated interest. At Theatre Shinjuku for days in a row, filmgoers filled the theatre with some even standing to watch the film. Following this, distribution company Kadokawa Herald Pictures increased the number of theatres showing the film across Japan, and submitted the film for international festival consideration.

North American distributor Bandai Entertainment premiered the film in North America on November 19, 2006, at the Waterloo Festival for Animated Cinema and on March 3, 2007, at the 2007 New York International Children's Film Festival. The movie received a limited release in the United States, being shown subtitled in Los Angeles in June, and in Seattle in September. Also, an English dubbed version was shown in New York City in July. Its Boston area showings in August were subtitled. The film has also premiered in the UK as part of the Leeds Young People's Film Festival on April 2, 2008. The film was made available on Cable VOD on December 1, 2010, throughout the United States on numerous major cable systems, such as Comcast, Time Warner, and Cox, among others, by VOD distributor Asian Media Rights, under the Asian Crush label.

In South Korea, it released in June 2007. The film grossed ₩664,964,500 in South Korea.

The film returned to Japanese cinemas on 4DX screens on April 2, 2021, for the 10th anniversary of Studio Chizu, the Studio Hosoda set up to produce his newer works, and the 15th anniversary of the film. An updated poster of classic visual has been released alongside a new trailer. The 2021 release was screened nationwide (excluding some cinemas) with United Cinemas as the distributor.

The film received a theatrical one day 4K re-release in Australia on January 15, 2026, alongside Summer Wars and Wolf Children by Sugoi Co, followed by Home Entertainment and Digital releases of all 3 films in February 2026 featuring Collector's Edition and Steel-Book Blu-Ray and UHD Blu-ray editions being available for the first time in Australia.

=== Critical response ===
The review aggregation website Rotten Tomatoes reports an 84% approval rating based on 19 reviews, with an average rating of 6.6/10. The website's consensus reads: "An imaginative and thoughtfully engaging anime film with a highly effective visual design. This coming-of-age comedy drama has mad inventiveness to spare." On Metacritic, the movie has an average score of 66 out of 100, which indicates "generally favorable reviews".

Justin Sevakis of Anime News Network praised the film for its "absolute magic." Sevakis felt that the film has "more in common with the best shoujo manga than [author Yasutaka] Tsutsui's other work Paprika". He said that the voice acting has "the right amount of realism [for the film]". Ty Burr of The Boston Globe praised the film's visuals and pace. He also compared the film to the works of Studio Ghibli. Nick Pinkerton of The Village Voice said, "there's real craftsmanship for how [the film] sustains its sense of summer quietude and sun-soaked haziness through a few carefully reprised motifs: three-cornered games of catch, mountainous cloud formations, classroom still-lifes." Pinkerton also said that the film is the "equivalent of a sensitively wrought read from the Young Adult shelf, and there's naught wrong with that." Author Yasutaka Tsutsui praised the film as being "a true second-generation" of his book at the Tokyo International Anime Fair on March 24, 2006.

=== Accolades ===
Year	Award	Category	Winner/Nominee	Result	Ref.
2006	Sitges Film Festival	Best Animated Film	The Girl Who Leapt Through Time	Won	
2006	Nihon SF Taisho Award	Grand Prize	The Girl Who Leapt Through Time	Nominated	
2006	The 10th Japan Media Arts Festival	Grand Prize	The Girl Who Leapt Through Time	Won	
2007	Japan Academy Prize	Animation of the Year	The Girl Who Leapt Through Time	Won	
2007	Tokyo Anime Awards	Animation of the Year	The Girl Who Leapt Through Time	Won	
2007	Tokyo Anime Awards	Director Award	Mamoru Hosoda	Won	
2007	Tokyo Anime Awards	Best Original Story/Work	The Girl Who Leapt Through Time: Yasutaka Tsutsui	Won	
2007	Tokyo Anime Awards	Scriptwriting Award	Satoko Okudera	Won	
2007	Tokyo Anime Awards	Achievement in Art Direction	Nizo Yamamoto	Won	
2007	Tokyo Anime Awards	Character Design Award	Yoshiyuki Sadamoto	Won	
2009	Young Artist Awards	Best Performance in a Voice-over Role	Emily Hirst	Won	

It won the Animation Grand Award, given to the year's most entertaining animated film, at the prestigious sixty-first Annual Mainichi Film Awards. It received the Grand Prize in the animation division at the 2006 Japan Media Arts Festival. It won the Special Distinction for Feature Film at France's thirty-first Annecy International Animated Film Festival on June 16, 2007. It played to full-house theatres during a screening in August 2007 at the ninth Cinemanila International Film Festival in Manila, Philippines.

== Soundtrack ==
The film's theme song is "Garnet" (ガーネット, Gānetto), and the insert song used in the film is "Kawaranai Mono" (変わらないもの, lit. Unchanging Thing(s)). Both songs were written, composed, and performed by singer-songwriter Hanako Oku. "Garnet" was arranged by Jun Satō and "Kawaranai Mono (Strings Version)" was arranged by Yoshida.

All music by Kiyoshi Yoshida, except where noted. Piano played by Haruki Mino.

The Girl Who Leapt Through Time Original Soundtrack
No.	Title	Music	Length
1.	"Natsuzora (Opening theme)"	Kiyoshi Yoshida	2:57
2.	"Sketch"	Yoshida	1:11
3.	"Aria (Goldberg Hensoukyoku Yori)" (Goldberg Variations by Bach)	Yoshida	3:10
4.	"Karakuri Tokei (Time Leap)"	Yoshida	0:51
5.	"Shoujo no Fuan"	Yoshida	2:46
6.	"Sketch (Long Version)"	Yoshida	4:37
7.	"Daylife"	Yoshida	2:09
8.	"Daiichi Hensoukyoku (Goldberg Hensoukyoku Yori)" (Variation 1 of Goldberg Variations by Bach)	Yoshida	1:15
9.	"Mirai no Kioku"	Yoshida	1:51
10.	"Seijaku"	Yoshida	6:45
11.	"Kawaranai Mono (Strings version)"	Hanako Oku	4:47
12.	"Natsuzora (Ending theme)"	Yoshida	2:37
13.	"Time Leap (Long version)"	Yoshida	3:17
14.	"Natsuzora (Long version)"	Yoshida	5:17
15.	"Garnet (Yokokuhen short version)"	Jun Satō	2:02

== Manga ==
The manga starts with Makoto Konno dreaming about discovering a younger Kazuko Yoshiyama unconscious after having just said farewell to Kazuo Fukamachi.

The film was adapted into a manga by Ranmaru Kotone and was serialised in Shōnen Ace a few months before the film's theatrical release. It received a 2009 English-language release for the Australian region with licensing by Bandai Entertainment and distribution by Madman Entertainment. The manga largely follows the same story as the film with some slight differences. Notably, the manga opens differently, with Makoto Konno dreaming of stumbling in on Kazuko Yoshiyama and Kazuo Fukamachi—the main characters of the original novel—parting ways, and ends with an epilogue of a young Kazuko waking up after Kazuo leaves in her proper time.

== See also ==
- List of films featuring time loops
