= The Girl Who Leapt Through Time (1983 film) =

- Theatrical release poster
- Japanese: 時をかける少女
- Directed by: Nobuhiko Obayashi
- Screenplay by: Wataru Kenmotsu
- Based on: The Girl Who Leapt Through Time by Yasutaka Tsutsui
- Produced by: Norihiko Yamada; Kyoko Obayashi
- Starring: Tomoyo Harada; Ryōichi Takayanagi; Toshinori Omi; Toshie Negishi; Ittoku Kishibe; Yukari Tsuda; Akiko Kitamura; Wakaba Irie; Takako Irie; Ken Uehara
- Cinematography: Yoshitaka Sakamoto
- Edited by: Nobuhiko Obayashi
- Music by: Masataka Matsutoya
- Production company: Kadokawa Haruki Corporation
- Distributed by: Toei Company
- Release date: July 16, 1983 (Japan)
- Running time: 104 minutes
- Country: Japan
- Language: Japanese
- Box office: ¥4.76 billion (Japan)

The Girl Who Leapt Through Time (Japanese: 時をかける少女, Hepburn: Toki o Kakeru Shōjo) is a 1983 Japanese science-fiction film directed and edited by Nobuhiko Obayashi, written for the screen by Wataru Kenmotsu, and starring idol Tomoyo Harada in her first film. It is based on the 1967 Japanese novel of the same name and was released by Toei in Japan on July 16, 1983. It has since been released internationally on DVD with English subtitles under various titles, including The Little Girl Who Conquered Time, Girl of Time, and The Girl Who Cut Time, among others.

It was the first film adaptation of The Girl Who Leapt Through Time, about a high-school girl who gains the ability to time-travel and repeatedly relives the same day in a time loop. The film was a major box office success in Japan, becoming the second highest-grossing Japanese film of 1983. It received a sequel in 2010.

== Plot ==
On a school skiing trip, Kazuko Yoshiyama talks with her friend Goro Horikawa about her dream boyfriend appearing from the stars. The two run into their childhood friend Kazuo Fukamachi, who is missing his skis. On their return to school, spring arrives.

At school, their teacher reminds the class to develop their body and mind, using a folk song that Yoshiyama recognises from her childhood. After school, Yoshiyama, Horikawa, and Fukamachi are assigned to clean the classrooms; due to someone using the chemicals in the laboratory during spring break they are also told to lock it from now on. While Horikawa and Fukamachi are disposing of rubbish, Yoshiyama enters the lab and falls unconscious after a beaker smashes, releasing white smoke. Horikawa and Fukamachi take her to the nurse's clinic.

The three of them walk home together, a bike on the road nearly hits them as Fukamachi holds Yoshiyama to one side. Fukamachi, who lives with his grandparents, invites Yoshiyama briefly into the greenhouse full of lavender, which she recognises as the scent in the laboratory. Later that night, Yoshiyama recalls the incident with the bike and begins to fall in love with Fukamachi. The following Sunday she returns Horikawa's handkerchief. Horikawa's parents urge him to go to university, but he insists on helping the family's soy sauce business.

In school, Yoshiyama begins to have strange premonitions. After embarrassing herself in class, she reviews the work at home. In the evening, an earthquake strikes the area and the buildings around the Horikawa family's shop catch fire. She awakes the following day (19 April) to find Horikawa on the way to school, awakening again upon the imminent danger of roof tiles falling on their heads. Yoshiyama goes to school but incorrectly assumes it's the 19th of April; she relives the day in her dreams. She goes to Fukamachi in the afternoon and tells him what happened. She remembers a childhood incident wherein the two of them were singing the folk song together and playing before a mirror fell and cut both of their hands. Upon saving Horikawa from the falling roof tiles the following morning she notices that his is the hand with the visible cut on it.

Seeking out Fukamachi, he takes her through her past, where it is revealed that Fukamachi actually died along with his parents when Yoshiyama was a young girl. She visualises returning to the laboratory whereupon the teenage Fukamachi explains that he is actually a time-traveller from the year 2660 with the aim of exploring Earth for drugs based on now-extinct plant life. He inserts himself into people's memories so that they'll have a positive view of him.

A distraught Yoshiyama confesses her love for him, and whilst reciprocating he explains that he has to erase the memories of everyone he's encountered. Asking whether she'll ever see him again, he replies that even if she does, she won't recognise him. Years later, a slightly despondent adult Yoshiyama goes to work researching pharmaceuticals, she and her sister greet Fukamachi's grandparents on their way. His grandparents reflect on the years passed, telling themselves to let go of their dead grandson. At the research centre Yoshiyama and the time-traveller run into each other, each looking back without the other seeing.

== Cast ==
The following are the film's main cast.

- Tomoyo Harada as Kazuko Yoshiyama
- Ryōichi Takayanagi as Kazuo Fukamachi
- Toshinori Omi as Goro Horikawa
- Yukari Tsuda as Mariko Kamiya
- Ittoku Kishibe as Toshio Fukushima

== Release ==
The Girl Who Leapt Through Time was released in theaters in Japan on July 16, 1983. In 2022, Third Window Films released the film on Blu-ray as part of their limited edition Nobuhiko Obayashi's 80s Kadokawa Years set, along with School in the Crosshairs, The Island Closest to Heaven, and His Motorbike, Her Island. It was later remastered in 4K in 2026.

== Reception ==
=== Box office ===
The Girl Who Leapt Through Time was a major box-office success in Japan. It earned a distribution income (gross rental) of ¥2.8 billion in 1983, becoming the second highest-grossing Japanese film of 1983, behind only Antarctica. The total box office gross revenue of The Girl Who Leapt Through Time was ¥4.76 billion in Japan.

=== Critical reception ===
In 1985, Donald Willis of Variety described the film as "more affecting than affected, informed less by cloying sentimentality and relatively honest sentiment." He commented on Tomoyo Harada, finding that she "proves herself a natural. Although she is convincing at what she does, the evidence here suggests she might have the range to do much anything else." He criticized Ryōichi Takayanagi's acting, stating that his delivery "of lines is undoubtedly the result of his brain-waves being controlled by a galaxy inhabited by monotonous no-talents."

In 2010, Marc Walkov of the Far East Film Festival gave the film a positive review, describing it as a "bittersweet story about the transitoriness of love and the importance of one’s memories in keeping the past alive." He also notes that the film anticipated plot elements of the Hollywood film Groundhog Day (1993), such as the protagonist repeatedly reliving the same day and thus being able to predict events that take place during the day.

== Theme song ==
"Toki o Kakeru Shōjo"

Single by Tomoyo Harada

from the album Toki o Kakeru Shōjo - Original Soundtrack
- Released: April 21, 1983
- Genre: Pop
- Label: Canyon Records
- Songwriter: Yumi Matsutoya

The song "Toki o Kakeru Shōjo" (時をかける少女) is the popular theme song for the 1983 movie, inspired by the story, written by Yumi Matsutoya, and originally sung by the film's lead actress, then-rookie idol Tomoyo Harada. There are several different versions.

=== Harada versions ===
The first version was released in April 1983 as the A-side of Tomoyo Harada's third single (7A0275), with a B-side "Zutto Soba ni" also written by Yumi Matsutoya and two different cover pictures, and was included on the original soundtrack album for the film (C28A0279). A second version of this song was released in 1983 on Harada's first album Birthday album (WTP-40188), and in 1986 on her compilation album Pochette (ポシェット, Pochetto) (CA30-1326). A third version was recorded in 1987 for her greatest hits album From T (32DH-848), and a fourth one in 2007 for her twenty-fifth anniversary original album Music & Me (XNHL-13001/B).

The 1983 single reached number 2 on the Oricon Singles Chart.

=== Matsutoya versions ===
Matsutoya covered her own song in the same year on the B-side of her single "Dandelion" (ダンデライオン) and on her album Voyager in 1983. She later rewrote it and renamed it as "Toki no Canzone" (時のカンツォーネ, Toki no Kantsōne) to be the theme song for the new, 1997 Toki o Kakeru Shōjo film, along with another of her songs: "Yume no Naka de (夢の中で)~We are not alone, forever~", both released on the original soundtrack album for the film (TOCT-9940) and on her album Suyua no Nami (スユアの波) in 1997.

=== Other versions ===
The original song was adapted in a commercial for noodles with then-beginning idol Yuki Kudo parodying the 1983 movie shortly after its release. Voice actress Ai Shimizu also covered the song as the B-side of her first single Angel Fish in 2003 (KICM-1077).

Hong Kong singer Sandy Lam covered this song in Cantonese in 1985.

== See also ==
- List of films featuring time loops
