= Miho Takagi (actress) =

Japanese actress and essayist

- Born: 29 July 1962 (age 63); Tokyo, Japan
- Occupations: Actress and essayist

Miho Takagi (高木美保, Takagi Miho; born 29 July 1962) is a Japanese actress and essayist. She dropped out of Wayo Women's University.

== Filmography ==
- W's Tragedy (1984)
- Early Spring Story (1985)
