= Tomoyo Harada =

Japanese actress, singer, and lyricist (born 1967)

Tomoyo Harada 原田 知世
- Born: November 28, 1967 (age 58); Nagasaki, Japan
- Occupations: Actress, singer, lyricist
- Years active: 1982–present
- Spouse: Ed Tsuwaki (2005–2013)

Tomoyo Harada (原田 知世, Harada Tomoyo; born November 28, 1967 in Nagasaki, Japan) is a Japanese actress, singer, and lyricist, and was a popular idol in the 1980s.

== Career ==
In 1982, Harada participated in a movie audition with the reason of wanting to meet Hiroyuki Sanada, and received a special award. In July of the same year, she made her acting debut in the Fuji TV drama Sailor Suit and Machine Gun. Her first role in a film was in 1983's Toki o Kakeru Shōjo for which she won the award for best newcomer at the 8th Hochi Film Award. She won the award for best actress at the 7th Yokohama Film Festival for Early Spring Story. Numerous other singles and albums have followed.

In the summer of 2007, Harada joined the pop electronica band "pupa" as a vocalist, at the invitation of Yukihiro Takahashi. Other members are Hiroshi Takano, Ren Takada, Hirohisa Horie, Tomohiko Gondo.

== Filmography ==
=== Films ===
Year	Title	Role	Notes
1983	The Girl Who Leapt Through Time	Kazuko Yoshiyama	Film distributor: Toei. The leading actress.
1984	Aijō Monogatari	Miho Nakamichi	Film distributor: Toei. The leading actress.
1984	Tengoku ni ichiban chikai shima (Island closest to Heaven)	Mari Katsuragi	Film distributor: Toei. The leading actress.
1985	Sōshun Monogatari	Hitomi Okino	Film distributor: Toho. The leading actress.
1986	Cabaret	Chieko	Film distributor: Toho.
1986	Kuroi Dress no Onna	Reiko Asabuki	Film distributor: Toho. The leading actress.
1987	Take Me Out to the Snowland	Yu Ikegami	Film distributor: Toho. The leading actress.
1989	Urban Marine Resort Story	Mariko Tanaka	Film distributor: Toho. The leading actress.
1991	Mangetsu	Mari Nohira	Film distributor: Shochiku. The leading actress.
1993	Kekkon	Mai Iwashita	Film distributor: Shochiku. The leading actress.
1993	Samurai Kids	Yuki Murata	Film distributor: Toho.
1993	Spain kara no Tegami	Natsuko Tamiya	Film distributor: Toho.
1995	Ashita	(nameless)	Film distributor: Toho.
1997	Kizudarake no Tenshi	Eiko Tachibana	Film distributor: Shochiku.
1997	Toki o Kakeru Shōjo	(narration)	
1998	Rakkasuru Yūgata	Rika Tsubota	Film distributor: Shochiku. The leading actress.
2000	Nagasaki Burabura-bushi	Umeji	Film distributor: Toei.
2004	Village Photobook	Noriko Takahashi	Film distributor: Video Planning, Wako.
2005	Ubume no Natsu	Ryoko Kuonji and Kyoko Kuonji (double role)	Film distributor: Nippon Herald Films.
2005	Sayonara Color	Michiko Oikawa	Film distributor: Zazie Films.
2005	Daiteiden no Yoru ni	Shizue Saeki	Film distributor: Asmik-Ace.
2006	The Blossoming of Kamiya Etsuko	Etsuko Kamiya	Film distributor: Pal-ep. The leading actress.
2006	Nihon no Jitensha Dorobō	(cameo appearance)	Film distributor: Cinema Angelica.
2006	Moonriders The Movie "Passion Maniacs: Mania no Junan"		Film distributor: Media Craft, White Noise Production. A documentary film.
2007	Tonarimachi Sensō	Mizuki Kasai	Film distributor: Kadokawa Pictures.
2010	You are Umasou (film)	Mother	Voice
2011	Tokyo Oasis	Kikuchi	Film distributor: Suurkiitos.
2012	Bread of Happiness	Rie Mizushima	Film distributor: Asmik-Ace. The leading actress.
2013	Pecoross' Mother and Her Days		
2018	Under One Umbrella		
2020	Under the Stars	Chihiro's mother	
2021	My Blood & Bones in a Flowing Galaxy		
2021	Your Turn to Kill: The Movie	Nana Tezuka	Film distributor: Toho. The leading actress.
2025	The 35-Year Promise	Kyoko Nishihata	Film distributor: Toei.
2027	Hara o Kukutte		Film distributor: Toei.

=== Television ===
Year	Title	Role	Notes
1993	Ryūkyū no Kaze	Aki	Taiga drama
2003	The Eldest Boy and His Three Elder Sisters	Kazuko Kashiwakura	
2011	Ohisama	Hiroko Sudō	Asadora
2018	Half Blue Sky	Wako Hagio	Asadora
2019	Your Turn to Kill	Nana Tezuka	The leading actress

== Discography ==
=== Studio albums ===
Title	Album details	Peak chart positions
Title	Album details	JPN
Birthday Album (バースデイ・アルバム)	Released: November 28, 1983; Label: EMI Music Japan	2
Nadeshiko Junjō (撫子純情)	Released: November 28, 1984; Label: CBS/Sony Records	2
Pavane	Released: November 28, 1985; Label: CBS/Sony Records	7
Next Door	Released: June 28, 1986; Label: CBS/Sony Records	4
Soshite	Released: November 28, 1986; Label: CBS/Sony Records	10
Schmatz	Released: July 29, 1987; Label: CBS/Sony Records	14
Tears of Joy	Released: May 21, 1990; Label: For Life Music	30
Blue in Blue	Released: November 28, 1990; Label: For Life Music	70
Sai (彩)	Released: May 21, 1991; Label: For Life Music	67
Garden	Released: August 21, 1992; Label: For Life Music	66
Egg Shell	Released: January 20, 1995; Label: For Life Music	—
Clover (クローバー)	Released: May 17, 1996; Label: For Life Music	80
I Could Be Free	Released: February 21, 1997; Label: For Life Music	10
Blue Orange	Released: August 21, 1998; Label: For Life Music	20
A Day of My Life	Released: September 22, 1999; Label: For Life Music	34
My Pieces	Released: November 20, 2002; Label: For Life Music	80
Music & Me	Released: November 28, 2007; Label: Hip Land Music Corp.	27
Eyja	Released: October 21, 2009; Label: EMI Music Japan	37
Noon Moon	Released: May 7, 2014; Label: Commmons	20
L'Heure Bleue	Released: November 28, 2018; Label: Universal Music Japan	20
Fruitful Days	Released: March 23, 2022; Label: Universal Music Japan	31

=== Compilation albums ===
Title	Album details	Peak chart positions
Title	Album details	JPN
Pochette	Released: November 1, 1986; Label: EMI Music Japan	25
From T	Released: November 28, 1987; Label: CBS/Sony Records	23
My Favorites	Released: July 21, 1988; Label: CBS/Sony Records	—
Singles Collection '82–'88	Released: September 1, 1988; Label: CBS/Sony Records	30
Flowers	Released: September 18, 1997; Label: For Life Music	5
Golden J-Pop The Best Tomoyo Harada	Released: August 21, 1998; Label: Sony Music Entertainment	—
2000 Best Tomoyo Harada	Released: July 19, 2000; Label: Sony Music Entertainment	—
Best Harvest	Released: November 21, 2001; Label: For Life Music	65
Golden☆Best ~As Time Goes On~ (ゴールデン☆ベスト ~As Time Goes On~)	Released: May 25, 2011; Label: For Life Music	80
Watashi No Ongaku 2007-2016 (私の音楽 2007-2016)	Released: August 23, 2017; Label: Universal Music Japan	56
Candle Lights	Released: October 16, 2019; Label: Universal Music Japan	38
Tomoyo Harada's Songs and Music (原田知世のうたと音楽)	Released: October 5, 2022; Label: Universal Music Japan	8

=== Cover albums ===
Title	Album details	Peak chart positions
Title	Album details	JPN
Kako	Released: February 18, 1994; Label: For Life Music	83
Summer Breeze	Released: June 20, 2001; Label: For Life Music	40
Love Song Covers (恋愛小説)	Released: March 18, 2015; Label: Universal Music Japan	30
Love Song Covers 2 (恋愛小説2〜若葉のころ)	Released: May 11, 2016; Label: Universal Music Japan	4
Love Song Covers 3〜You & Me (恋愛小説3〜You & Me)	Released: October 14, 2020; Label: Universal Music Japan	16
Love Song Covers 4〜Music Flight (恋愛小説4〜音楽飛行)	Released: October 25, 2023; Label: Universal Music Japan	24

=== Mini-albums ===
Title	EP details	Peak chart positions
Title	EP details	JPN
Karin (カリン)	Released: November 27, 2024; Label: Universal Music Japan	30
Anemone (アネモネ)	Released: July 23, 2025; Label: Universal Music Japan	28

=== Singles ===
Title	Year	Peak chart positions	Album
Title	Year	JPN	Album
"Kanashiikurai Honto no Hanashi" (悲しいくらいほんとの話)	1982	41	Non-album singles
"Tokimeki no Accident" (ときめきのアクシデント)	1982	67	Non-album singles
"Toki o Kakeru Shōjo" (時をかける少女)	1983	2	Birthday Album
"Dandelion〜Osozaki no Tanpopo" (ダンデライオン〜遅咲きのたんぽぽ)	1983	—	Birthday Album
"Aijō Monogatari" (愛情物語)	1984	3	Love Story Original Soundtrack
"Tengoku ni Ichiban Chikai Shima" (天国にいちばん近い島)	1984	1	Nadeshiko Junjō
"Sōshun Monogatari" (早春物語)	1985	4	Pavane
"Dōshitemasuka" (どうしてますか)	1986	7	From T
"Ame no Planetarium" (雨のプラネタリウム)	1986	12	Next Door
"Sora ni Dakarenagara" (空に抱かれながら)	1986	11	Soshite
"Aerukamoshirenai" (逢えるかもしれない)	1987	24	Schmatz
"Kare to Kanojo no Sonnet" (彼と彼女のソネット)	1987	19	Schmatz
"Taiyō ni Naritai" (太陽になりたい)	1988	17	Singles Collection '82–'88
"Silvy"	1990	54	Tears of Joy
"Shizukana Yoru" (静かな夜)	1991	—	Sai
"T'en va pas"	1994	—	Non-album single
"Attends ou va-t'en"	1994	—	Egg Shell
"Ashita" (あした)	1995	95	Ashita Original Soundtrack
"100 Love-Letters"	1996	—	Clover
"Romance" (ロマンス)	1997	39	I could be free
"Sincere" (シンシア)	1997	25	Flowers
"Koi o Shiyō" (恋をしよう)	1998	70	Blue Orange
"Nanairo no Rakuen" (七色の楽園)	1998	—	Blue Orange
"You can jump into the fire"	1999	—	a day of my life
"Tears of Joy" (New version)	2001	—	Non-album single
"Sora to Ito -talking on air-" (空と糸 -talking on air-)	2002	43	My Pieces
"Yume de Aetara" (夢で逢えたら) (feat. Deen)	2002	44	Waon -Songs for children-
"Romance" (ロマンス) (Remake version)	2017	50	Non-album singles
"Kotobadori" (コトバドリ)	2019	—	Non-album singles
"Violet" (ヴァイオレット)	2021	—	fruitful days

=== pupa ===
==== Studio albums ====
Album #	Album information
1st	floating pupa: Released: July 2, 2008
2nd	dreaming pupa: Released: July 28, 2010
