= Time Traveller: The Girl Who Leapt Through Time =

2010 Japanese science fiction film

- Theatrical release poster
- Directed by: Masaaki Taniguchi
- Written by: Tomoe Kanno
- Based on: Toki o Kakeru Shōjo by Yasutaka Tsutsui
- Starring: Riisa Naka
- Cinematography: Shogo Ueno
- Edited by: Ryūji Miyajima
- Music by: Tatsuya Murayama
- Distributed by: StyleJam, Inc.
- Release date: March 13, 2010 (Japan)
- Running time: 122 minutes
- Country: Japan
- Language: Japanese

Time Traveller: The Girl Who Leapt Through Time, originally released as Toki o Kakeru Shōjo (Japanese: 時をかける少女; lit. "The Girl Who Runs Through Time"), is a 2010 Japanese science fiction fantasy film directed by Masaaki Taniguchi and written by Tomoe Kanno. It is the fourth film based on the novel The Girl Who Leapt Through Time and is a sequel to the original 1983 film adaptation. The film stars Riisa Naka as the protagonist Akari Yoshiyama, daughter of the original story's protagonist Kazuko Yoshiyama. Naka previously voiced Akari's cousin, Makoto Konno, the protagonist of the 2006 anime adaptation, which followed a different story.

== Plot ==
In 2010, Kazuko Yoshiyama (Narumi Yasuda) works as a pharmaceutical researcher secretly developing a formula for time travel. After a car accident, she is left comatose. She briefly regains consciousness and tells her daughter Akari to travel back in time to 1972 and deliver a message to her first love, Kazuo Fukamachi (Kanji Ishimaru). Akari mistakenly travels to 1974 and befriends Ryota Mizorogi (Akiyoshi Nakao), who lets her stay in his apartment until she can return to her time.

Ryota aspires to be a famous director, and Akari helps film a movie with him during the time they spend together. Akari also meets her father in the past. Akari and Ryota place a personal ad for Kazuo to meet them in the lab Akari first appeared in, but when the previously dictated time and date for the meeting comes, Ryota is too caught up in grief over his father's sudden death to appear. Akari delivers the message to Kazuo, saying that her mother remembers the promise he made to visit her in the future. Kazuo tells Akari of his history with her mother. Kazuko had met Kazuo in the middle school science lab and accidentally inhaled the fumes of his time travel formula, allowing her to time-jump brief amounts of time. He erases her memory of him, and plans to do the same to Akari.

Akari asks to say goodbye to Ryota, who does not know when she is going back to her time. Ryota bids Akari farewell in misunderstanding, as he is leaving for a day trip. He gives Akari the soundless movie film to keep. Akari realizes too late that Ryota is going on a bus that will famously crash off a cliff and kill all passengers, and rushes off to save him, but Kazuo stops her from changing the past and erases her memory of both himself and Ryota.

She returns home to her mother being awake and well, and finds the film, which she has no conscious memory of receiving. Upon viewing, she cries but does not really understand why. Akari walks off into the cherry blossom trees in the same way she did in Ryota's movie.

== Cast ==
- Riisa Naka as Akari Yoshiyama
- Akiyoshi Nakao as Ryota Mizorogi
- Narumi Yasuda as Kazuko Yoshiyama
- Masanobu Katsumura as Goro Asakura
- Kanji Ishimaru as Kazuo Fukamachi
- Munetaka Aoki as Kotetsu / Masamichi Hasegawa
- Anna Ishibashi as Young Kazuko Yoshiyama
- Shota Chiyo as Young Goro Asakura
- Tokio Emoto as Satoru Motomiya
- Mayu Kitaki as Natsuko Ichise
- Yuya Matsushita as Toru Kadoi

== Release ==
The film had a R1 DVD release on January 24, 2012, from Asian Crush.

== Adaptation ==
The film received a manga adaptation titled Toki o Kakeru Shōjo After (時をかける少女 after) that was serialized in Young Ace between October 2009 and February 2010. The "After" refers to it taking place after the novel, and not after the events of the film.

== See also ==
- List of films featuring time loops
