= Kyohei Nakamura =

Japanese baseball player

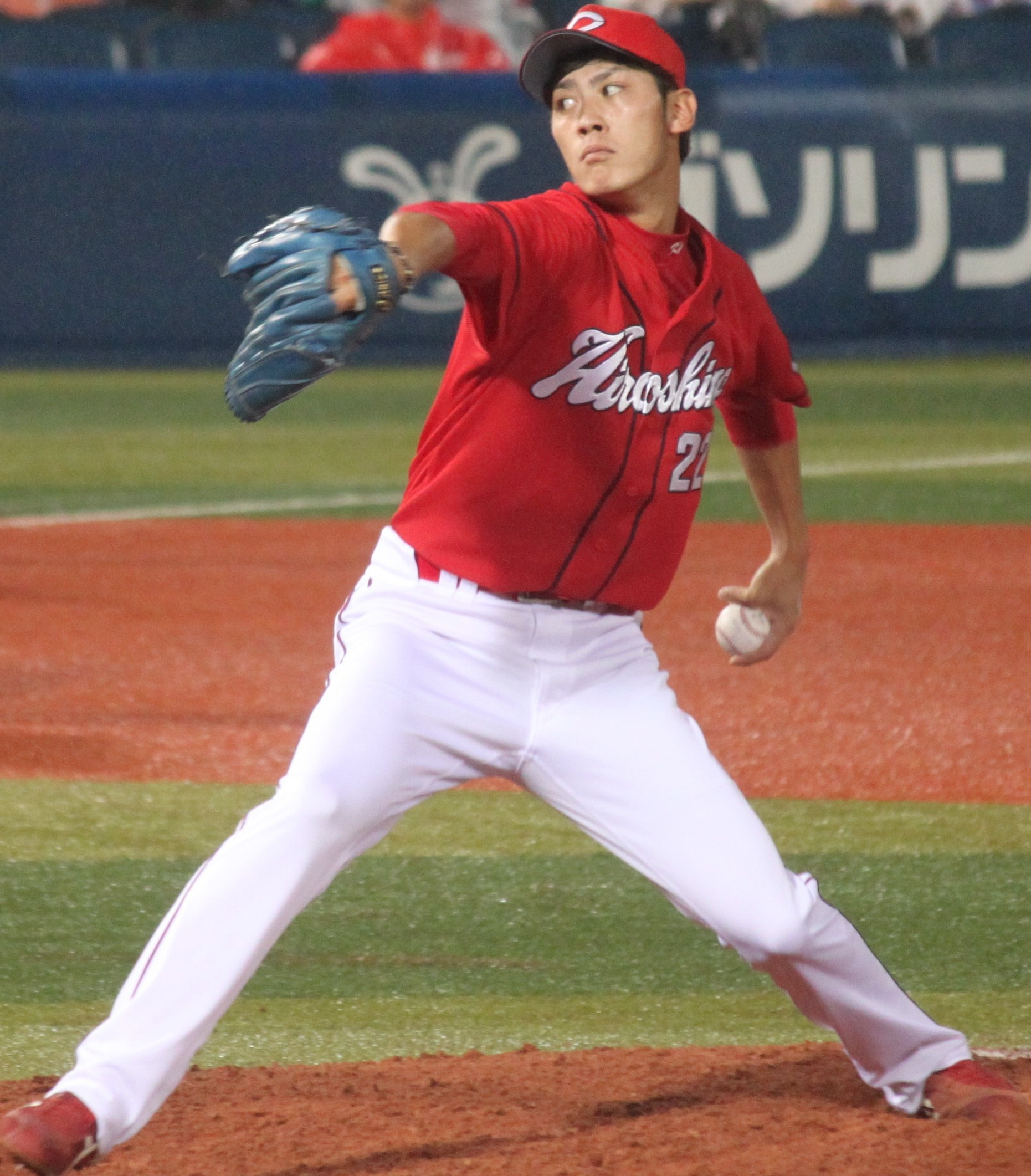
- Pitcher
- Born: March 22, 1989 (age 37); Fukuoka, Fukuoka, Japan
- Bats: Left Throws: Left

debut
- June 26, 2011, for the Hiroshima Toyo Carp

NPB statistics (through 2020 season)
- Win–loss record: 2–11
- ERA: 4.23
- Strikeouts: 134
- Stats at Baseball Reference

Teams
- Hiroshima Toyo Carp (2011–2021)

Kyohei Nakamura (中村 恭平, Nakamura Kyōhei; born March 22, 1989) is a professional Japanese baseball player. He plays pitcher for the Hiroshima Toyo Carp.
