= The Girl Who Leapt Through Time =

1967 novel by Yasutaka Tsutsui

- 1967 Japanese edition novel cover
- Author: Yasutaka Tsutsui
- Original title: Toki o Kakeru Shōjo
- Translator: David James Karashima
- Language: Japanese
- Genre: Drama, romantic love, science fiction novel
- Publisher: Kadokawa Shoten
- Publication date: 1967
- Publication place: Japan
- English publication date: May 26, 2011: UK: Alma Books
- Media type: Print (magazine and paperback)
- OCLC: 55101281

The Girl Who Leapt Through Time (時をかける少女, Toki o Kakeru Shōjo; lit. 'The Girl Who Soars Through Time') is a science fiction novel by Yasutaka Tsutsui. Originally serialized from 1965 to 1966, it tells the story of a high-school girl who accidentally acquires the ability to time travel, which leads to a time loop where she repeatedly relives the same day.

Originally serialised in seven installments in two of Gakken's secondary school student-aimed magazines, beginning in Chūgaku Sannen Course in November 1965 and ending in Kō Ichi Course in May 1966, and first published as a book in 1967 by Kadokawa Shoten, it has gone on to become one of Tsutsui's most popular works and has been reinterpreted in other media many times, the most famous internationally being a 1983 live-action film directed by Nobuhiko Ōbayashi, and a 2006 anime film directed by Mamoru Hosoda. The original novel was first published in English translation by the British publisher Alma Books on May 26, 2011, in a translation by David James Karashima.

The title is also that of a song, written by Yumi Matsutōya to be performed by Tomoyo Harada for the 1983 film, which has enjoyed considerable fame of its own.

== Plot ==
Kazuko Yoshiyama, a third-year middle school student, is cleaning the school science lab with her classmates, Kazuo Fukamachi and Gorō Asakura, when she smells a lavender-like scent and faints. After three days, events transpire around Kazuko, including the burning of Gorō's house after an earthquake. The next morning, at the exact moment of a car accident, Kazuko is transported 24 hours into the past.

She relives the day and relates her strange experience to Kazuo and Gorō. They do not believe her at first, but they are convinced when she accurately predicts the earthquake and ensuing fire. Goro also almost gets hit by a truck but Kazuko knows and tells him, so it adds to Goro believing her even more. They go to see Fukushima, their science teacher, who explains Kazuko's new ability as "teleportation" and "time-leap". To solve the riddle of her power, she must leap back four days.

Finally, Kazuko's determination enables her to make the leap. Back in the science room, she meets a mysterious man who has assumed her friend Kazuo's identity. He is really "Ken Sogoru", a time-traveler from AD 2660. His intersection with the girl's life is the accidental effect of a "time-leaping" drug. Ken remains for a month, and Kazuko falls in love with him. When he leaves, he erases all memories of himself from everyone he has met, including Kazuko. As the book ends, every time she smells lavender Kazuko has the faint memory of somebody promising to meet her again.

== Publication history ==
The novel was first serialized in the Japanese youth magazines Chu-3 Course and Kō-1 Course, from November 1965 to May 1966, and has been regularly re-edited in Japan ever since, notably in 1967, in 1997 for the release of the second film, and in a new version in 2006 for the release of the animated film, including two more stories: Akumu no shinsô and Hateshinaki tagen uchû. The novel is also published in foreign countries, like France (La Traversée du temps, 1983), South Korea, and China.

According to the scholar Ulrich Heinze, the novel represents the first fully formed version of time travel as an exploration of self. In contrast to other time travel stories up until the 1960s which typically involved expeditions, The Girl Who Leapt Through Time limited the time jumps to a short period to examine adolescence. It was also an early example of a time loop narrative, anticipating plot elements of the later Hollywood film Groundhog Day (1993).

== Adaptations ==
=== 1972 television series ===
NHK produced two adaptations titled Time Traveler and Zoku Time Traveler, aired in 1972. Starring Mayumi Asano.

=== 1983 film ===
The 1983 live-action film is a direct adaptation of the novel, released on July 16, 1983 in Japan by Tōei, directed by Nobuhiko Ōbayashi, with a screenplay by Wataru Kenmotsu, and starring idol Tomoyo Harada in her first film. It's been since released internationally on DVD, with English subtitles, under several unofficial English titles (The Little Girl Who Conquered Time, Girl of Time, The Girl Who Cut Time, among others).

This film was a major box office hit in Japan and was the second highest-grossing Japanese film of 1983.

=== 1983 short story ===
Yasutaka Tsutsui wrote a short story parodying his own novel titled Scenario: Toki o Kakeru Shōjo in response to the film adaptation.

=== 1985 drama ===
Adapted to an episode of Getsuyō Drama Land. Starring Yoko Minamino.

=== 1994 drama ===
The second live-action television adaptation aired as a five-episode Japanese television live-action TV series broadcast on Fuji Television between February 19 and March 19, 1994. It was directed by Masayuki Ochiai and Yūichi Satō, with screenplay by Ryōichi Kimizuka and music by Joe Hisaishi. It stars the then-rookie idol Yuki Uchida in the main role.

=== 1997 film ===
The second live-action film adaptation of was released in Japan on November 8, 1997, directed by Haruki Kadokawa, with a screenplay by Ryōji Itō, Chiho Katsura and Haruki Kadokawa, starring beginner Nana Nakamoto in the main role.

=== 2002 TV film ===
The novel was adapted into one third of the Shinshun! Love Stories anthology film starring members of the all-girl J-pop group Morning Musume. The segment was written by Toshio Terada, starring Abe Natsumi and directed by Kazuhiro Onohara.

=== 2006 anime film ===
The Girl Who Leapt Through Time was produced by the animation studio Madhouse and distributed through Kadokawa Herald Pictures, first released in theaters in Japan on July 15, 2006. The film was later released on DVD on April 20, 2007 in Japan in regular and limited editions. The film features Riisa Naka, who later portrayed Akari Yoshiyama in the 2010 live action movie Time Traveller: The Girl Who Leapt Through Time, as the lead character, Makoto Konno, the niece of Kazuko Yoshiyama, who is the protagonist of the novel, and cousin of Akari Yoshiyama.

=== 2010 film ===
A third Japanese live-action film adaptation of The Girl Who Leapt Through Time was announced in Yahoo Japan and released on March 13, 2010. The theme song of the film was performed by Ikimono-gakari. The movie features Riisa Naka, who previously voiced the protagonist Makoto Konno in the 2006 animated film The Girl Who Leapt Through Time, as the lead character, Akari Yoshiyama, the daughter of Kazuko Yoshiyama and cousin of Makoto Konno. The film is a sequel to the original tale in which Kazuko's daughter, Akari, travels back in time to relay a message to Ken.

=== 2016 drama ===
A 5 episode live-action television series was aired in 2016, with Fuma Kikuchi of Sexy Zone and Yuina Kuroshima.

=== 2017 stage play ===
A stage play adaptation of Zoku Time Traveler premiered in Tokyo in 2017.

=== Manga ===
The novel was adapted in 2004 into a two-volume manga called The Girl Who Runs Through Time (時をかける少女, Toki o Kakeru Shōjo), illustrated by Gaku Tsugano, and story by Yasutaka Tsutsui. The manga was released in English in October 2008 by CMX Manga. A manga adaptation of the 2006 anime film was serialized in Kadokawa Shoten's Shōnen Ace manga magazine between April 26 and June 26, 2006, illustrated by Ranmaru Kotone; the chapters were later collected into a single bound volume which went on sale on July 26, 2006. Another manga, known as Toki o Kakeru Shōjo: After (時をかける少女 After), set as prelude to the 2010 film was serialized in Young Ace magazine.
