= Demon Pond (2005 film) =

Filmed stage play by Takashi Miike

- US DVD cover
- Directed by: Takashi Miike
- Written by: Keishi Nagatsuka
- Based on: Demon Pond by Izumi Kyōka
- Produced by: Yoshiaki Iba
- Starring: Ken'ichi Endō
- Music by: Kōji Endō
- Production company: Hakuhodo DY Media Partners
- Release date: May 25, 2005 (Japan)
- Running time: 130 minutes
- Country: Japan
- Language: Japanese

Demon Pond (夜叉ヶ池, Yashagaike) is a filmed stage production of Demon Pond, a play by Keishi Nagatsuka based on the 1913 play by Izumi Kyōka. The production, directed by Takashi Miike, was filmed before a live audience and released on DVD in Japan on May 25, 2005.

== Plot ==
A man from Tokyo, Gakuen Yamazawa, passes through a mountain village while returning from a summer field trip. The source of the only stream in the small village is Demon's Pond. The locals believe that a dragon resides there and that the water is poison. There he meets Yuri Hagiwara, a woman who asks him to tell her a story. His second story upsets her and she refuses to let him stay, but her husband Akira awakens and welcomes Yamazawa, his old friend from Tokyo.

Akira had left to gather stories from the countryside but believes that he has ended up becoming one of the stories because he is now responsible for ringing the local bell for the village at matins, vespers, and the mid-watch of the night instead of wandering and enjoying his freedom. He made the promise to a dying seventy-nine-year-old man named Yatabei who had performed the same function for fifty years based on the conviction that the water from Demon Pond will flood the populated areas of Kotohiki Valley beneath Echizen's Three Province Peak if it the bell is not rung at the correct times. Akira now calls himself Yatabei, has married Yuri, and refuses to return to Tokyo despite Yamazawa's urging. Yamazawa decides to climb to Demon Pond and Akira accompanies him, leaving Yuri responsible for the bell.

The giant crab Kanigoro and the carp Koishichi are sent down from Demon Pond by Lady Myriad, the nurse of Dragon Pond's Princess Shirayuki, to tell the villagers that there will be no rain despite their offerings of broken pottery and the heads of cats and dogs. Koishichi recounts that the princess is in love with the prince of Serpent Pond by Sword Peak at the foot of Mount Hakusan but if she flies to him it will cause a flood that will kill the villagers so she remains at Demon Pond as long as the bell is rung at the proper times.

A catfish priest named Black representing the prince of Serpent Pond comes bearing a letter from the prince to the princess of Demon Pond. He received the order to deliver it while he was imprisoned, causing him to fear that the letter might include instructions for the princess to eat him. The giant crab Kanigoro cuts it open for him but there is only water inside the small letter box that the catfish is carrying.

The lovesick Princess Shirayuki is determined to visit the prince but her nurse Lady Myriad explains that she is bound to a vow made by her ancestors that she cannot leave as long as the bell is rung at the proper times or else the gods and buddhas will curse her and her kin of the pond as well, leading to their destruction alongside the humans. Princess Shirayuki rushes to destroy the bell holding her prisoner but just when she is about to strike it she hears Yuri singing a lullaby to her baby doll Taro because she misses Akira. Princess Shirayuki is amazed that the lullaby can soothe Yuri's pain of missing Akira and decides not to destroy the bell and fly away because it would destroy Yuri as well.

Villagers attack Yuri when she is alone in her house that night because they intend to sacrifice the most beautiful girl in the village to an ox for rain. They tie her up but she is freed by Akira, who explains that Yamazawa decided to return to his family when he heard Yuri's lullaby, so they called off the journey and Akira returned home as well. The villagers refuse to let Akira take Yuri away because they believe that he is an outsider but she belongs to the village. Yamazawa arrives and admonishes the villagers for their intentions, revealing himself as a priest of the Honganji sect and a professor at Tokyo University. He argues that Japan is being held back by adherence to outdated traditions such as bushidō. They demand Yuri but Akira fends them off with his scythe and tells them that Princess Shirayuki was once a girl named Yuki who was sacrificed to an ox and in revenge set fire to straw placed on its back and sent it into the village to burn it. The leader tells Denkichi to fight Akira, and they battle, with Denkichi using a long knife and Akira using his scythe. When Akira is injured, Hatsuo, one of the villagers who admires Yuri grabs the scythe and fights against Denkichi until Yuri grabs the scythe and kills herself with it. Akira carries her away as he promised, asking Yamazawa to ring the bell. Yamazawa agrees and enters the bell tower just as the dragon princess arrives, bringing a wave of destruction with her. Akira tells Yuri that she was right all along, then kills himself with the scythe. The princess dragon awakens Yuri to sing a song with her before departing. The final shot shows Yamazawa as the new bellringer with Hatsuo at Yuri's home holding her doll Taro.

== Cast ==
- Shinji Takeda as Akira Hagiwara
- Tomoko Tabata as Yuri Hagiwara
- Ryūhei Matsuda as Gakuen Yamazawa
- Yasuko Matsuyuki as Princess Shirayuki
- Ken'ichi Endō as Giant Crab / Representative
- Kitaro as Catfish / Takuzen
- Tetsurō Tamba as Yatabei

== Production ==
Demon Pond was Miike's first stage production. His next stage production was Miike Takashi × Aikawa Show: Zatoichi, filmed in 2007 and released on DVD in 2008.

The musical score was written by frequent Miike collaborator Kōji Endō, who had previously worked with him on Rainy Dog (1997), Full Metal Yakuza (1997), The Bird People in China (1998), Young Thugs: Nostalgia (1998), Ley Lines (1999), Audition (1999), Dead or Alive (1999), Man, Next Natural Girl: 100 Nights in Yokohama (1999), The City of Lost Souls (2000), Visitor Q (2001), Agitator (2001), The Happiness of the Katakuris (2001), Dead or Alive: Final (2002), Sabu (2002), Graveyard of Honor (2002), The Man in White (2003), Gozu (2003), One Missed Call (2003), Zebraman (2004), Three... Extremes (2004), and Izo (2004).

== Home media ==
The DVD of the filmed performance was released in Japan on May 25, 2005. It contains an interview with director Takashi Miike as a special feature.

== Reception ==
Reviewer Björn Becher of filmstarts.de gave the film 3/5 stars, describing the first half as more filled with humor and the second half as more dramatic.

In a positive review of the film, Michael Den Boer of 10kbullets.com wrote that "Demon Pond is like a rare flower which begs to be seen by a larger audience" and that "the strongest asset for this production is the acting which is mesmerizing from top to bottom."

Adam Symchuk of asianmoviepulse.com wrote that the film "shows Miike’s versatility as a director, and showcases what many feel have always been Miike’s greatest strength: the ability to adapt within any genre and utilize the strength of the cast and visuals to make his subject matter work."

Nicholas Sheffo of fulvuedrive-in.com gave the film a grade of B−, calling it "some of Miike’s best work to date".

Álvaro Arbonés of skywaspink.com wrote that the film seems like it was tailor-made for Miike with its "collision of the real world and the world of fantasy, of politics and comedy, of theater and cinema."
