= Bodyguard Kiba 2 =

Bodyguard Kiba 2 may refer to:

- Bodigaado Kiba: Hissatsu sankaku tobi, a 1973 sequel to the 1973 film Bodyguard Kiba, directed by Ryuichi Takamori
- Bodyguard Kiba: Apocalypse of Carnage, a 1994 sequel to the 1993 film Bodyguard Kiba, directed by Takashi Miike
- Bodyguard Kiba: Apocalypse of Carnage 2, a 1995 sequel to the 1994 film Bodyguard Kiba: Apocalypse of Carnage, directed by Takashi Miike
