= Man in White =

Man in White is a term that in Christian cultures is often used to refer to God or to Jesus Christ, especially to when the Apostle Paul had an encounter in the Acts of the Apostles with a man in white presumed to be God or Jesus. In Western cultures, heroes, saviors, and other "good guys" are depicted wearing this color. It may also refer to:

- The Man in White, 2003 Japanese film
- Man in White, 1986 religious tome by Johnny Cash
