= Zatoichi (2008 film) =

Filmed stage play by Takashi Miike

Miike Takashi × Aikawa Show: Zatoichi
- Japanese DVD cover
- Directed by: Takashi Miike
- Screenplay by: Takashi Miike; Masa Nakamura
- Based on: Zatoichi by Kan Shimozawa
- Starring: Aikawa Show
- Distributed by: Pony Canyon; WOWOW
- Release date: May 30, 2008 (DVD)
- Running time: 166 minutes
- Country: Japan
- Language: Japanese

Miike Takashi × Aikawa Show: Zatoichi (三池崇史 × 哀川翔 『座頭市』), also known as Zatoichi Live, is a filmed stage production of Zatoichi, a play co-written by Takashi Miike and Masa Nakamura based on the character created by Kan Shimozawa. It was Miike's second filmed stage production, following Demon Pond in 2005. The stage production was performed and filmed on December 12, 2007, and the DVD was released on May 30, 2008.

== Plot ==
A reward is offered for Zatoichi, who has killed some Kappo officials. He causes a disturbance at a gambling house when he discovers that the dice are being switched by a man hidden under the table. This arouses the notice of the "Twin Snakes" Cho ("Red Viper") and Ryo ("Black Viper"), who seek to obtain the reward for Zatoichi, but Zatoichi escapes with the deaf biwa player Kanbachi no Hachi. Cho and Ryo are killed by Ryunosuke. Zatoichi and Hachi collect Japanese brown frogs to sell in town as a source of medicine in exchange for money to use for eating and drinking.

They encounter the Ake-Tayu Company, a group of traveling entertainers led by Ake and featuring lead actor Ranmaru, Okon the "walking princess", Oso the shamisen player, prop master Tanesuke, white-haired Yohei, drummer Soba, and recorder player Some. The group is heading toward the inn in Hanagari to meet with Boss Asakawa to prepare to stage a comedy show in Otsuko for the fall festival. At the inn they find that the yakuza boss Asakawa's henchman Kumakichi, who had previously taken care of them when they were there to perform, left Asakawa the previous summer and became the boss of his own group.

The elderly Goroku, a Buddhist gravedigger, is treated unkindly by the mistress of the inn but is treated kindly by the younger waitress Oito before he returns to his home outside of town. Zatoichi and Hachi visit Goroku at his home so that Zatoichi can receive his blessing before dying. Goroku explains that he discovered a map on a dead traveler then showed it to Kumakichi, who took it from him. Kumakichi did not show it to his boss Asakawa but rather kept it to himself, creating a dispute that led to Kumakichi leaving the group and forming his own group. Goroku believes that the map leads to the samurai Takeda Shingen's family treasure.

Zatoichi uses his skills as a masseur on Asakawa, who is lovelorn over Ake. Asakawa is distraught that she visited Kumakichi before him but Zatoichi insists that it was merely out of necessity. When Asakawa learns that Ryunosuke has taken up work as Kumakichi's bodyguard, he challenges his own bodyguard Gonzo to fight Zatoichi. Gonzo refuses to fight the blind man so Asakawa fires him and hires Zatoichi as his new bodyguard. He is particularly distressed to learn that Ake and Ryunosuke recognized each other and appear to be attracted to each other.

Ryunosuke brings the drunken Hachi to the site of the play and encounters Ake but they barely speak to each other. Ake explains to Oso and Yohei that Ryunosuke had rejected an arranged marriage, causing the prospective bride to kill herself, and that Ryonosuke had tried to atone for this by killing himself but failed in his attempt. Ryunosuke encounters Zatoichi alone and draws his sword but is surprised by Zatoichi's speed and leaves him be.

Gonzo, who has learned of the treasure, suggests to his girlfriend Okon that he should offer his services to Kumakachi as a bodyguard to monitor Kumakachi and Ryunosuke while she goes to Akasawa to monitor him and Zatoichi. Gonzo applies to be Kumakachi's bodyguard while Okon pretends to be a medium sensing malicious spirits attacking the house of Akasawa in order to gain the attention of his guards. She warns of a "Great Fox", which they interpret to be Ryunosuke. Okon meets up with Gonzo but when Ranmaru crosses their path, Okon kills him with Gonzo's sword.

Zatoichi and Ryunosuke drink together and Ryunosuke confesses that he killed the brother of the girl to whom he was supposed to be wed when the brother came for revenge. Since then he has left the blood on his blade and his curse will not be broken until the blade breaks. He challenges Zatoichi but Zatoichi stops him, admitting that he also loves Ake but that he has a price on his head and that Ryunosuke would be a better suitor to her instead of getting a price on his head for killing Zatoichi. Ake is unable to decide between the two and discusses it with Oso and Hachi, then suggests that Oso should be with Hachi. One of Akasawa's men overhears and tells Akasawa that Ake has feelings for Zatoichi.

Yohei finds Ranmaru's body and brings the others to it. Ryunosuke says that the murderer could be someone involved in the treasure hunt that he heard Kumakachi discussing. Zatoichi visits Goroku to request a burial for Ranmaru while Oito visits Goroku to bring him some leftovers from the inn. Goroku confesses to them that there is no treasure and that he made the map himself.

Asakawa kidnaps Ake during a fight near the stage but loses her again when Okon sets fire to fuel in a store room in Akasawa Mansion. Okon finds the map, then stabs Gonzo in order to keep it for herself. She takes Ake hostage but is stabbed in the back by Gonzo. Okyo and Ocho arrive to avenge their slain brothers Cho and Ryo but Ryunosuke defeats them, then kills Gonzo and embraces Ake. She asks him to tell her his real name but he will not so she moves away from him and dies in Zatoichi's arms instead.

Asakawa's men attack Zatoichi and he defeats them all. Ryunosuke attacks Zatoichi, who cuts Ryunosuke's blade in half, breaking the curse, before ultimately killing him. Goroku asks Zatoichi to kill him as well. Hachi attempts to do it but Zatoichi stops him and kills Goroku himself, then promises to dig a grave for him.

Oito returns to the inn and Zatoichi departs from Hachi and Oso as they travel onward to Yoshino.

== Cast ==
- Aikawa Shō as Zatōichi
- Ken'ichi Endō as Ryunosuke
- Saki Asami
- Sadao Abe as Hachi
- Hiroyuki Nagato as Goroku
- Yujin Nomura as Ranmaru
- RIKIYA
- Sachiko Matsura
- Ryūzō Tanaka as Gonzo
- Toshiya Nagasawa as Kumakachi
- Hirohisa Nakata as Akasawa
- Aiko Ito as Oso
- Sota Aoyama

== Production ==
Takashi Miike had long been a fan of the Zatoichi series. In an article for The Guardian, Miike wrote, "Most of all, I love the Zatoichi series about the blind swordsman, especially the first one, from 1962. It's a masterpiece." The stage production was co-written by Takashi Miike and Masa Nakamura. It was Sho Aikawa's first starring stage role. The live performance was staged and filmed at the Shinjuku Koma Theater on December 12, 2007.

== Home video ==
A DVD of the filmed stage production was released on May 30, 2008.

== Reception ==
In a review for Bleeding Cool, reviewer Rich Johnston wrote that "Miike had a background in experiment theatre before he became a filmmaker, and here he brings an almost avant-garde sense of minimalism to the staging, relying on basic, abstract sets and special lighting to go from naturalist village settings to a more abstract atmosphere suggesting Zatoichi’s state of mind, and also alternating between traditions of bawdy humour, pathos and choreographed action in both theatre and movies."

Writing for Midnight Eye, Tom Mes noted that "Takashi Miike’s 2007 stage version, starring Show Aikawa in the title role, adhered firmly to the Misumi tradition" in that it "demonstrated a certain reticence in the use of violence" unlike other adaptations that "amped up the violence".

Reviewer Mr. C of Planet Chocko called it "a pure work of art" that is "stunningly performed & expertly crafted with very smooth set to set changeovers."
