= Negotiator (2003 film) =

2003 Japanese crime television film

- Japanese poster
- Based on: Kōshōnin by Takahisa Igarashi
- Screenplay by: Kota Yamada
- Directed by: Takashi Miike
- Country of origin: Japan
- Original language: Japanese

Production
- Running time: 107 minutes
- Production companies: Excellent Film; Wowow

Original release
- Network: Wowow
- Release: August 17, 2003

Negotiator (交渉人, Kōshōnin) is a 2003 Japanese crime TV film directed by Takashi Miike.

== Plot ==
Three man wearing motorcycle helmets rob a convenience store then abandon their vehicle outside a hospital. A group of people are taken hostage in the hospital and Inspector Ishida and Captain Tohno handle the negotiations. Ishida suggests allowing the three criminals to escape with three doctors as their hostages in order to let the other hostages go free. After this is done, Lt. Ado tries to understand the motive for the crime. He discovers that something else is behind the crime and that the hospital was not selected by chance.

== Cast ==
- Hiroshi Mikami as Inspector Ishida
- Mayu Tsuruta as Capt. Maiko Tohno
- Shirō Sano as Lt. Ando
- Kenichi Endō as Convenience store clerk
- Masatō Ibu as Ishida's boss
- Renji Ishibashi as Counselor Kanemoto
- Kumi Nakamura as Mrs. Ishida
- Shigemitsu Ogi
- Oji Osuga
- Kenji Takechi as SAT
- Yōji Tanaka

== Reception ==
Reviewer Panos Kotzathanasis of asianmoviepulse.com called the film "a TV movie that strays much away from the violence and the absurdness usually associated with Miike’s works. In fact, the Japanese master takes full advantage of a multi-leveled story, full of plot twists, in order to present a thriller that thrives on atmosphere and characters, to the point that it could also be described as a psychological drama." The review continues, "The cinematography of the film is excellent, with Miike using a muted color palette that suits a story that unfolds mostly during the night and in settings with little light, quite nicely. However, the most exceptional aspect is the framing, with the camera portraying a number of scenes that present both the actual situation and the underlying psychology, exceptionally." The review concludes, "For its great, even if it goes a bit overboard, story, impressive cinematography, and even as a rare exercise in restraint for Miike, 'The Negotiator' definitely deserves a watch."

Mubi Notebook's Ignatiy Vishnevetsky praised the film, writing, "It shouldn't be overlooked that Negotiator happens to be a very broadly entertaining film, and sometimes a conventionally accomplished one, just as it was intended to be."

Todd Brown of Screen Anarchy wrote, "It has an admirable level of complexity for a commercial thriller but lacks some of the bang and dazzle that people often demand from this sort of film."
