= Kumamoto Stories =

2002 Japanese anthology film

Kumamoto monogatari
- DVD cover
- Directed by: Takashi Miike
- Release date: July 20, 2002 (DVD)
- Running time: 122 minutes
- Country: Japan
- Language: Japanese

Kumamoto Stories (熊本物語, Kumamoto monogatari) is a Japanese historical anthology film directed by Takashi Miike. Released on DVD on July 20, 2002, it contains three short films produced between 1998 and 2002 presenting legends about the history of Kumamoto Prefecture.

== Tsuiketsu Fantasy: The Dream Legend of Tonkararin ==
Zuiketsu gensō: Tonkararin yume densetsu (隧穴幻想 トンカラリン夢伝説, Zuiketsu gensō: Tonkararin yume densetsu)

- Runtime: 33 minutes.
- Produced in 1998 by the Government of Kikusui-machi and the Government of Kumamoto-ken.
- Filming took place in Kikusui, Kumamoto.

=== Plot ===
1500 years ago, samurai invaders attack a village along the Kikuchi River near a cave in the east side of the country named Tsuiketsu where the people gather in the tenth month to receive the god Tsui. The invaders kill everyone except a little girl hiding in the cave who uses her mother's magic necklace to summon the dragon god to defeat them.

Twenty years later, more samurai invaders from the Mikado invade the country. The girl's husband gives his life fighting the samurai to protect her while standing before the cave. Facing this new threat, she sacrifices herself and saves the country by stabbing herself while wearing the necklace. The dragon god Tsui arrives and sheds tears of sorrow for the fallen couple, transforming them into balls of light living in the hearts of the people to this day.

=== Cast ===
- Mikijirō Hira

== Kikuchi Castle Story: The Song of the Defenders ==
Kikuchi-jō monogatari - sakimori-tachi no uta (鞠智城物語 防人たちの唄, Kikuchi-jō monogatari - sakimori-tachi no uta)

- Runtime: 29 minutes.
- Produced in 2000 by the Government of Kumamoto-ken and the Kumamoto Prefectural Decorative Tumulus Museum.
- This segment was filmed partly in 3D. Partway through the story, a Sakimori reminds viewers to remove their 3D glasses.

=== Plot ===
In the year 663, Prince Nakano-Oe, the future Emperor Tenji, sends his army to the Korean Peninsula to support the restoration of Kudara, which had been destroyed by the joint armies of Toh and Shiragi. His army is destroyed in the battle of Hakusukinoe and, fearing retaliation by Toh and Shiragi, the Prince builds castles in strategic defensive locations, particularly on the island of Kyushu. Soldiers from mainland Japan are drafted as Sakimori (frontline defenders) to serve at the castles.

A group of Sakimori are sent to Kikuchi Castle, 60 km south of the capital Dazaifu. Kurota, a watchman, has a dream that the city is invaded by Toh and Shiragi soldiers. Three years later, when their service period is nearly complete, a soldier from Kudara who was at the battle of Hakusukinoe dies saving some Sakimori when a building collapses on them. The short film ends by stating that many citizens of Kudara defected to Japan, bringing their technology and culture with them to help create what Japan is now.

=== Cast ===
- Tōru Emori as Paekche nobleman (as Tooru Emori)
- Renji Ishibashi as Nakatomi-no-Kamatari
- Jinpachi Nezu as Frontier guard
- Ren Osugi as Naka-no-Ooe-no-ōji

== A Woman in the Revolt of the Clans ==
Onna kunishū ikki (おんな 国衆一揆, Onna kunishū ikki)

- Runtime: 60 minutes.
- Produced in 2002 by Brooks (Burukkusu) Inc., the Government of Kumamoto-ken, the Government of Mikawa-machi, and the Japan Lottery Association (which provided a grant).
- Production services were provided by Kansai Location Service (KLS) Corporation.
- Filming took place in the Tamana District of Kumamoto, including the grounds of Tanaka Castle in Mikawa-machi.
- Screenplay by Itaru Era.

=== Plot ===
At the end of the 16th century, Toyotomi Hideyoshi appoints Sassa Narimasa lord of Higo Province. In 1587, Sassa orders a land value inspection of the 52 local clans, breaking an earlier agreement. Chikanaga Kumabe, head of Waifu Castle in the country of Kikuchi, refuses the order. Other clans join with him and together they wage war on Sassa in the Revolt of the Clans. Hideyoshi's army of 200,000 decimates the revolting clans within six months. The final holdouts are the armies of Chikazane Wani and Chikayuki Ebaru, 900 soldiers who hole themselves up in the impregnable Tanaka Castle against Sassa's army of 10,000. As food runs low, Ebaru's wife Yori expresses her wish to die with the castle. Wani's wife Maki says that she will die with him, as does his son. When they learn that the castle will be invaded by Hideyoshi's army the following day, they give Yori the task of sneaking the women and children away to a safe place because she was not born a Wani but rather was captured during a war as a child. After Yori has gone, Ebaru and his men murder Chikamune and his men then take Wani hostage. Maki attempts to kill herself but Yori convinces her to stay alive to perpetuate the clan. Yori finds the slain soldiers and puts on the armor of Chikamune, then rides to the castle and kills Ebaru. The remaining soldiers fight with Wani but are defeated by Sassa's army. Yori later tries to kill Sassa but is shot to death by his soldiers. Sassa is criticized for his handling of the war and commits seppuku at Hideyoshi's instruction.

=== Cast ===
- Mihoko Abe
- Noriko Aota
- Ayumi Asakura
- Ken'ichi Endō
- Yoshio Harada
- Mie Hata
- Kazuki Kitamura
- Naoto Takenaka
- Yutaka Yokota

== Home video ==
The three short films were released together as the anthology film Kumamoto monogatari on July 20, 2002.

== Reception ==
Noting that the films were produced as educational content for children, Panos Kotzathanasis of Asian Movie Pulse wrote, "The triptych is of some value, with a number of interesting elements here and there, but in essence, this is a film mostly addressed to children of the area (it actually fulfills its initial purpose to the fullest) and hardcore fans of Miike".
