= Audition (Murakami novel) =

1997 novel by Ryū Murakami

- Front cover of the Japanese novel
- Author: Ryu Murakami
- Original title: オーディション
- Translator: Ralph McCarthy
- Language: Japanese
- Publisher: Bunkasha (ぶんか社)(Japan); Bloomsbury Publishing PLC (UK); Penguin (US)
- Publication date: 1997
- Publication place: Japan
- English publication date: 2009
- Media type: Print (Paperback)
- Pages: 213 (Bunkasha)
- ISBN: 4-8211-0549-7
- OCLC: 37518572

Audition (オーディション, Ōdishon) is a Japanese novel by Ryu Murakami, first published in 1997. It was the basis for the 1999 film Audition directed by Takashi Miike. An English version of the novel was published in 2009.

== Characters ==
- Aoyama: Aoyama is a 42-year-old widower who sets two goals for himself on the recommendation of a physician. The first goal is to spend as much time as possible with his son Shige, which he considers to have been accomplished. The second goal is to bring an acclaimed East German pipe organist to Japan to hold a free concert, which in reality is a ploy to enable him to record the rare concert and sell it on VHS. Aoyama is extremely nostalgic about the Japan of his youth, often complaining about modern music and culture, seeing it as materialistic and boring.
- Yamasaki Asami: A beautiful 24-year-old aspiring actress that Aoyama meets during an audition for a non-existent film that is arranged to give him the opportunity to meet a prospective wife. Aoyama falls in love with her as soon as he sees her. During one of their dates, Asami reveals that she was a victim of childhood abuse by her step-father, who used a wheelchair and believed that Asami wasn't human after giggling at her own father's funeral. At first, it seems that Asami has been able to cope with this trauma through ballet but it is revealed that the abuse has left her extremely unstable and violent, often entering into relationships with men only to murder them by severing their feet for "lying".
- Yoshikawa: Aoyama's long-time friend and business associate who first introduces Aoyama to the idea of arranging an "audition". Yoshikawa is the first character in the novel to mistrust Asami, after discovering that her mentor has already been dead for nearly a year and a half.
- Shige: Aoyama's fifteen-year-old son and only child from his marriage with Ryoko. Shige is described as a bright and athletic young man who is considerably popular at his high school. He often acts as a foil to his father. Shige inadvertently triggers the events of the novel by asking his father: "Why don't you find yourself a new wife, Pops?"
- Ryoko: Aoyama's wife who died from viral cancer seven years prior to the events of the novel.

== Reception ==
Kim Newman, writing for The Independent, compared the English-adaptation of the book to the film of the same name by Takashi Miike, finding that the movie was "suggestive about elements the book spells out bluntly. Miike gained a lot from elegantly wrought source material – but the book is now in danger of seeming like a draft, or even a screen treatment." Kasia Boddy praised the novel in The Telegraph, stating that Murakami "allows author and reader to have it both ways, simultaneously indulging a taste for schlock and some low-level guilt about 'objectification'".

Nathan Rabin of Artforum opined: "Audition depends less on the bracing nastiness of its final twist than on the skillful interplay of the horrific and the mundane" and that "Murakami is not a subtle writer. He lays out the freshman-level psychology behind Asami's actions with all the ham-fisted literalness of the psychiatrist explaining how poor Norman Bates went a little batty after murdering his mother and her lover in Psycho. But if Audition skirts sexism, it's still enormously savvy about the roles class, age, social status, and gender play in romantic relationships, as well as about the queasy voyeurism and exploitation endemic to the entertainment industry."

== Adaptation ==
In January 2025, it was reported Focus Features and Hyde Park Entertainment were planning an adaptation to be directed and written by Christian Tafdrup and co-written by Christian's brother and collaborator Mads Tafdrup.
