= Graveyard of Honor =

Graveyard of Honor may refer to either of two films:

- Graveyard of Honor (1975 film), directed by Kinji Fukasaku
- Graveyard of Honor (2002 film), directed by Takashi Miike
