= Bodyguard Kiba: Apocalypse of Carnage =

1994 Japanese martial arts film

- PAL DVD cover
- Directed by: Takashi Miike
- Screenplay by: Hisao Maki
- Story by: Ikki Kajiwara
- Produced by: Hidehiro Ito; Chang Hwa-Kun
- Cinematography: Kuo Mu-Sheng
- Edited by: Yasushi Shimamura
- Music by: Tomio Terada
- Production company: KSS
- Distributed by: KSS
- Release date: October 22, 1994
- Running time: 64 minutes
- Country: Japan
- Languages: Japanese; Chinese; English

Bodyguard Kiba: Apocalypse of Carnage (修羅の黙示録 ボディーガード牙, Shura no mokushiroku: Bodigaado Kiba), also known as Bodyguard Kiba 2: Combat Apocalypse or simply Bodyguard Kiba 2, is a 1994 Japanese direct-to-video martial arts/action film directed by Takashi Miike. It is the sequel to the 1993 film Bodyguard Kiba and is followed by Bodyguard Kiba: Apocalypse of Carnage 2 (1995), the final part of the trilogy.

== Plot ==
Kiba is once again hired by Tetsugen Daito, head of the Daito Karate dojo. He is promised an incredible fee of 20 million yen to take 25-year-old Natsuki Kirishima to Taiwan and guard her there for a week as she handles some business affairs before meeting up with her lover to move to America. In Taipei, Kiba and Natsuki meet up with Shu, leader of the Taiwan branch of Daito Karate, who houses them in his dojo as a safer alternative to a public hotel. That night four masked fighters with bladed weapons sneak in and attack Kiba in his room but he fights them off. The next day Kiba follows Natsuki to a remote location where he fights off four men wielding bō staffs who flee as tourists with cameras approach. Natsuki refuses to tell Kiba who is after her.
Shu introduces Kiba and Natsuki to Mr. Wang, head of the trade company that supports his dojo. Mr. Wang encourages him and others to learn more Chinese martial arts and explains that he once fought Tetsugen Daito in a friendly match at Kowloon Castle in Hong Kong. After dinner, Mr. Wang takes them to celebrate in a strip club.
Tetsugen Daito realizes that Natsuki is the daughter of a competitor from the Genryukan School who killed himself after losing a match to Tetsugen 20 years earlier. He tells his assistant Maki Kasuga to send for Ryo, who is working at the Government Counter-Guerilla Field Base in Manila. It is revealed that Shu is actually Hideyuki Jonouchi, Natsuki's brother, and they both harbor a grudge against Daito Karate but Natsuki has fallen in love with Kiba. Mr. Wang has been using them in an attempt to take over the Daito Karate school and is disappointed by Shu's failure.
Mr. Wang sends a group of men with guns to kill Kiba and Kiba fights most of them off before being shot in the leg. Ryo and Maki arrive and save the day by fighting off the rest of the men. Shu confesses that he has been a part of the effort to defeat the Daito Karate school. Due to Kiba's injury, Ryo battles Shu in the Jaren Ruins for the honor of the Daito Karate school. Shu is knocked off of one of the walls but Ryo and Natsuki pull him to safety. Mr. Wang sends men with guns to kill them but Sun, the strongest member of the Genryukan School, and other members of the school fight alongside Ryo to defeat them. Afterwards, Sun takes Shu and Natsuki to the airport to escape from Taiwan and Mr. Wang.

== Cast ==
- Takeshi Yamato as Naoto Kiba
- Takanori Kikuchi as Ryo
- Noriko Arai as Natsuki
- Jack Kao as Shu
- Hung Liu as Wang
- Chang I-Teng as Son
- Liu-Ko as Jounouchi
- Lien Pi-Tung as Oyaji
- Megumi Sakita as Maki Kasuga
- Hisao Maki as Tetsugen

== Voices ==
- Len Ohsugi
- Wang Tienkie
- Lin I
- Chenghung Chen
- Bou Kou Chan
- Steven Weng
- Si Reo

== Production and release ==
Following the production of Shinjuku Outlaw, the films Bodyguard Kiba: Apocalypse of Carnage and Bodyguard Kiba: Apocalypse of Carnage 2 were shot back-to-back, largely in Taiwan. The film was released direct-to-video on October 22, 1994. Following the success of Audition, Bodyguard Kiba and Bodyguard Kiba: Apocalypse of Carnage were released on DVD in the UK under Tartan's Asia Extreme label.
The second film in the trilogy has been shown or released under various alternative English titles, including Bodyguard Kiba 2: Apocalypse of Carnage, Bodyguard Kiba 2: Combat Apocalypse, and Bodyguard Kiba: Apocalypse Gang.

== Reception ==
In his book Agitator: The Cinema of Takashi Miike, author Tom Mes writes that the sequels' "lack of quality is a good example of how uneven the director’s output was in the first years of his career. Shot largely in Taiwan from screenplays by Hisao Maki, these sequels represent probably the lowest point in Miike’s career from an artistic point of view. They are listlessly shot, sloppily edited (by Yasushi Shimamura, who would go on to become Miike’s regular editor, greatly improving his skills along the way) and feature universally poor performances by actors whose voices are shoddily dubbed in a poorly delivered mishmash of languages." Mes goes on to criticize the "uninspired martial arts scenes" and particularly the sequences of screenwriter Hisao Maki "working out alone in his karate dojo, bare-chested and his skin gleaming with oil", finding that, "with absolutely no relation to the story, this sequence is no longer just a case of vain self-indulgence, it’s simply masturbatory."

In a review of the film for Asian Movie Pulse, reviewer Alexander Knoth criticized the film's "low-level storytelling" and "continuity flaws" but still found it to be a "tribute to classic Hong Kong Martial Arts cinema".

== Sequel ==
This sequel film was followed by a third Bodyguard Kiba film, Bodyguard Kiba: Apocalypse of Carnage 2 (修羅の黙示録2 ボディーガード牙, Shura no mokushiroku 2: Bodigaado Kiba) (also known as Bodyguard Kiba: Combat Apocalypse 2), which was released on February 3, 1995.
