= Bodyguard Kiba (1993 film) =

1993 Japanese martial arts film

- Directed by: Takashi Miike
- Written by: Comic Book: Ikki Kajiwara; Ken Nakagusuku; Screenplay: Hisao Maki; Tetsuya Sasaki
- Cinematography: Naosuke Imaizumi
- Music by: Tomio Terada
- Release date: June 25, 1993
- Running time: 93 minutes
- Country: Japan
- Language: Japanese

Bodyguard Kiba (ボディガード牙, Bodigaado Kiba) is a 1993 Japanese martial arts/action film directed by Takashi Miike.

== Plot ==
Junpei, a low-level yakuza of the Soryu Group in Okinawa, steals 500 million yen from his boss Shinjo en route to a heroin deal. Before Shinjo can punish him, the police raid the gang's office, saving Junpei's life by landing him in prison for five years. Upon release, he offers 5 million yen to the invincible professional bodyguard Kiba of the Kaito Karate dojo to escort him to the hidden loot so that he can find his girlfriend Yoko, a Taiwanese prostitute, and escape forever.

Junpei is ambushed outside of the prison, but Kiba fights off the attackers. Junpei grabs one of their guns, meaning that they cannot board a plane and they are forced to travel back to Okinawa by boat. Aboard the boat they are attacked by Okinawan karateka hired by Shinjo. Junpei attempts to use his gun, but Kiba prevents him from using it and defeats the attackers with karate, after which Junpei throws his gun in the ocean before they arrive in Okinawa.

Shinjo plants a fake quote in the newspaper of Kiba ridiculing Okinawa Karate, causing Okinawa Karate to present a formal letter of challenge to Kiba. Tetsugen Daito, head of the Daito Karate school, accepts the challenge on Kiba's behalf and defeats all of the challengers unarmed, yet others continue to attack Kiba and Junpei as they search for Yoko.

They find Yoko but the Soryu Group has gotten her addicted to heroin and she works with them to fake her own kidnapping as well as the kidnapping of Tetsugen Daito's assistant Maki. Shinjo calls Junpei and demands the missing 500 million yen in exchange for the two women.

Junpei retrieves the money from inside heavy bags at his old boxing gym. Later, a member of the Okinawa Karate school who is also an Okinawa police officer informs them that Maki is being held at Club Satine and that Yoko has become Shinjo's mole. The three men sneak into the club and rescue Maki, who helps them fight the other members of the Soryu Group at Shinjo's hideout. Junpei and Kiba defeat Junpei's old rival Yasunaga, then they confront Shinjo and Yoko on the roof. Shinjo gives Yoko a gun to kill Junpei but instead she shoots herself through the heart, killing herself as well as Shinjo behind her. Junpei leaves for Tokyo, promising to pay Kiba's fee when he arrives. The Okinawa cop then challenges Kiba for the honor of the Okinawa Karate school but is defeated in a battle of karate.

== Cast ==
- Hisao Maki as Tetsugen Daito
- Masaru Matsuda
- Daisuke Nagekura as Junpei
- Ren Osugi as Shinjo
- Megumi Sakita as Maki Kasuga
- Shinobu Tanaka as Yoko
- Takeshi Yamato as Naoto Kiba

== Sequels ==
Two sequels were released:

- Bodyguard Kiba: Apocalypse of Carnage (修羅の黙示録 ボディーガード牙, Shura no mokushiroku: Bodigaado Kiba) (also known as Bodyguard Kiba 2: Combat Apocalypse) was released on October 22, 1994.
- Bodyguard Kiba: Apocalypse of Carnage 2 (修羅の黙示録2 ボディーガード牙, Shura no mokushiroku 2: Bodigaado Kiba) (also known as Bodyguard Kiba 3: Second Apocalypse of Carnage) was released on February 3, 1995.

== Reception ==
Alexander Knoth of Asian Movie Pulse gave the film a positive review, writing that "Miike manages to keep a fast pace, which is sometimes a problem with his other movies. This is mainly owed to an interesting mix between yakuza drama and martial arts elements. In the nicely choreographed fight scenes, the former boxer Yamato Takeshi, can fully show off his skills as Bodyguard Kiba." Knoth further writes that "the shots were surprisingly good. Especially the scenes shot on board the ferry are very impressive and are among my favorite Miike sequences. In these scenes, the film establishes the subplot of male bonding between Junpei and Kiba."

In his book Agitator: The Cinema of Takashi Miike, author Tom Mes writes that "Bodyguard Kiba constitutes a major improvement over not only A Human Murder Weapon but all the films Miike had made up until that point" and that "script-wise too the film was an improvement over its predecessor", concluding that "by taking the time to portray his characters, Miike has also created a more developed and more human character than ever before."
