= Bodyguard Kiba: Apocalypse of Carnage 2 =

1995 Japanese martial arts film

- Directed by: Takashi Miike
- Screenplay by: Hisao Maki
- Story by: Ikki Kajiwara
- Produced by: Hidehiro Ito; Chang Hwa-Kun
- Cinematography: Kuo Mu-Sheng
- Edited by: Yasushi Shimamura
- Music by: Tomio Terada
- Production company: KSS
- Distributed by: KSS
- Release date: February 3, 1995
- Running time: 74 minutes
- Country: Japan
- Languages: Japanese; Chinese; English

Bodyguard Kiba: Apocalypse of Carnage 2 (修羅の黙示録2 ボディーガード牙, Shura no mokushiroku 2: Bodigaado Kiba), also known as Bodyguard Kiba 3: Second Apocalypse of Carnage, Bodyguard Kiba: Combat Apocalypse 2, or simply Bodyguard Kiba 3, is a 1995 Japanese direct-to-video martial arts/action film directed by Takashi Miike. It is the final part of Miike's Bodyguard Kiba trilogy, following the 1993 film Bodyguard Kiba and the 1994 film Bodyguard Kiba: Apocalypse of Carnage.

== Plot ==
Kiba is hired by the film production company Happy World to protect the actress Leesyang, who has received a death threat from Chang, her former patron whose family fell apart due to their love affair and who is now dying of cancer with only months to live. Still recovering from being shot in the leg, Kiba hands the assignment over to Ryo, who flies to Taiwan where the film is being shot. Wang Dachen gives Chang money to hire a roaming biker gang led by Huong to kidnap Leesyang so that Chang can kill her, but their first attempt is stopped by Ryo and his assistant Maki. Following this attack, the director Huang decides to let Leesyang rest while he shoots scenes with her stand-in Ranhuang. When Ranhuang ends up being kidnapped, Ryo sneaks into their hideout at night and rescues her following a fight with several of Huong's men. He returns to find that Leesyang has been kidnapped by Huong and Chang while he was gone and that she is going to be killed at Qingshui Cliff. Ryo rushes there and defeats Huong, then sees Chang pointing his rifle at Leesyang. She explains to Chang that she left him in order to devote herself to becoming a star, then offers to die together with him, walking to the edge of the cliff. Chang tells her to stop and throws himself off the cliff instead.

== Cast ==
- Takeshi Yamato as Kiba
- Takanori Kikuchi as Ryo
- Cindy Meng as Leesyang
- Sayoko Yoda as Ranhuang
- Hsiao Hu-Tou as Chang
- Hisao Maki as Tetsugen
- Masaaki Asato as Huang
- Chang I-Teng as Son
- Lu Shun-Keng as Chen
- Wayne Chen as Huong
- Michihiko Yanagimoto as Izumida
- Megumi Sakita as Maki
- Hung Liu as Wang
- Masato Iida
- Kuan Kuan
- Hsu Yung-Tan
- Chen Wen-Hui
- Chien Te-Shing
- Tan Yi-Hwa

== Voices ==
- Len Ohsugi
- Bai Jei
- Wang Tienkie
- Wang Kintei
- Lan Hao Wei
- Tsuan Son Sin
- Jhon Chen
- Chenghung Chen
- Homi Yarita
- Bou Kou Chan
- Steven Weng
- Si Reo
- Lin I
- Hiroyuki Tanabe

== Production and release ==
Following the production of Shinjuku Outlaw, the films Bodyguard Kiba: Apocalypse of Carnage and Bodyguard Kiba: Apocalypse of Carnage 2 were shot back-to-back, largely in Taiwan. For this reason the third film in the trilogy has a copyright date of 1994 in its credits, yet it was first released direct-to-video on February 3, 1995.
The third film in the trilogy has been shown or released under various alternative English titles, including Bodyguard Kiba 3: Second Apocalypse of Carnage, Bodyguard Kiba: Combat Apocalypse 2, and Bodyguard Kiba: Apocalypse Gang 2.
The production designer was Wayne Chen, who also played the role of the biker gang leader Huong. The stunt coordinators were Liou Han-Shing and Masaaki Asato, who also played the role of the film director Huang. Hisao Maki, the screenwriter of the film, also played the role of Tetsugen and was one of the executive producers of the film.

== Reception ==
In his book Agitator: The Cinema of Takashi Miike, author Tom Mes writes that the sequels' "lack of quality is a good example of how uneven the director’s output was in the first years of his career. Shot largely in Taiwan from screenplays by Hisao Maki, these sequels represent probably the lowest point in Miike’s career from an artistic point of view. They are listlessly shot, sloppily edited (by Yasushi Shimamura, who would go on to become Miike’s regular editor, greatly improving his skills along the way) and feature universally poor performances by actors whose voices are shoddily dubbed in a poorly delivered mishmash of languages." Mes goes on to criticize the "uninspired martial arts scenes" and particularly the sequences of screenwriter Hisao Maki "working out alone in his karate dojo, bare-chested and his skin gleaming with oil", finding that, "with absolutely no relation to the story, this sequence is no longer just a case of vain self-indulgence, it’s simply masturbatory." With regard to Bodyguard Kiba 3 in particular, Mes criticizes the fact that "Ryō actually takes over as protagonist in Bodyguard Kiba 3, with Naoto Kiba making little more than a cameo appearance."

In a negative review of the film for Asian Movie Pulse, reviewer Alexander Knoth wrote that the film "is probably the worst cooperation between Miike and Maki. It is a 74-minute disaster and a bad example of how not to work with foreign actors. The final part makes you appreciate the first two films and proves that no matter how low you think the bar was set, there is always a chance that someone or something can underbid that level. Dear die-hard Takashi Miike fan, please skip this one."
