= Tennen Shōjo Man =

- Based on: a manga by Tetsuya Koshiba
- Written by: Itaru Era
- Directed by: Takashi Miike
- Composer: Koji Endo

Production
- Producer: Nobuaki Muroka
- Cinematography: Masayuki Suzuki; Jun Maruyama; Katsumi Takeuchi
- Editors: Yasushi Shimamura; Keiko Takagi

Original release
- Network: WOWOW
- Release: February 22, 1999

Tennen Shōjo Man (天然少女萬; lit. Natural girl Mann) is a Japanese television miniseries directed by Takashi Miike. The show is an adaptation of a manga series by Tetsuya Koshiba about a schoolgirl with power fighting abilities.

== Cast ==
- Jun Matsuda
- Yoshihiko Hakamada
- Runa Nagai
- Yuki Matsuoka
- Natsumi Yokoyama
- Shunsuke Matsuoka
- Masako Ikeda
- Kôji Tsukamoto
- Yuko Miyamura

== Background and production ==
Tennen Shōjo Man was director Takashi Miike's first television production since 1992's Last Run. The series is not episodic, but works as self-contained three-and-a-half-hour-long film. The show is set in Tokyo.

== Release ==
Tennen Shōjo Man was first shown in Japan on February 22, 1999. The show has been released on VHS and DVD by Pony Canyon in Japan.

== Episodes ==
No.	Title
1	"Spain Zaka Gekito (Spain Slope Violent Battle)"
2	"Koen-dori Gyakushu Hen (Park Road Retaliation)"
3	"Shibuya Kessen Hen (Shibuya Blood Feud)"

== Notes ==
=== References ===
- Mes, Tom (2006). Agitator: The Cinema of Takashi Miike. FAB Press. ISBN 1903254418.
