= Shield of Straw =

2013 Japanese thriller film

- Theatrical release poster
- Directed by: Takashi Miike
- Written by: Tamio Hayashi
- Based on: Wara no Tate by Kazuhiro Kiuchi
- Produced by: Naoaki Kitajima; Shigeji Maeda; Misako Saka
- Starring: Takao Osawa; Nanako Matsushima; Tatsuya Fujiwara; Tsutomu Yamazaki
- Cinematography: Nobuyasu Kita
- Edited by: Kenji Yamashita
- Music by: Kôji Endô
- Production companies: NTV; OLM; Warner Bros. Pictures Japan; Kōdansha; Yahoo! Japan; East Japan Marketing & Communications Inc. YTV; STB; MMT; SDT; CTV; HTV; FBS
- Distributed by: Warner Bros. Pictures Japan
- Release date: 26 April 2013 (Japan)
- Running time: 125 minutes
- Country: Japan
- Language: Japanese
- Box office: $8.8 million

Shield of Straw (Japanese: 藁の楯, Hepburn: Wara no Tate) is a 2013 Japanese spy thriller film directed by Takashi Miike. It was nominated for the Palme d'Or at the 2013 Cannes Film Festival and it was released on 26 April 2013.

== Synopsis ==
Ninagawa was a powerful man in Japanese politics and with top economic connections. His granddaughter is then murdered. The suspect is Kunihide Kiyomaru. Three months after the murder of his granddaughter, Ninagawa places a whole page ad in the three major Japanese newspapers. The ad states that if Kiyomaru is killed, Ninagawa will offer ¥1,000,000,000 as a reward. Kunihide Kiyomaru turns himself in at the Fukuoka Prefectural Police station. Five detectives from the Security Police (SP) of the Tokyo Metropolitan Police Department travel to Fukuoka to escort Kunihide Kiyomaru back to the Tokyo Metropolitan Police Department. The distance between Fukuoka and Tokyo is apprixmately 1,200 km.

== Cast ==
- Takao Osawa as Kazuki Mekari
- Nanako Matsushima as Atsuko Shiraiwa
- Tatsuya Fujiwara as Kunihide Kiyomaru
- Masatō Ibu as Kenji Sekiya
- Kento Nagayama as Masaki Kamihashi
- Hirotarō Honda as Oki
- Kimiko Yo as Chikako Yuri
- Tsutomu Yamazaki as Ninagawa

== Production ==
The filming began on 19 August 2012, and took place in Japan, primarily in Aichi and Mie Prefectures, and Taiwan. After the Shinkansen denied filming onboard its rolling stock, the train scenes were shot at the Taiwan High Speed Rail in September that year, with the support of the Taipei Film Commission.

== Remake ==
On 24 October 2016, it was announced that EuropaCorp is planning an English-language remake to be penned by Creighton Rothenberger and Katrin Benedikt and produced by Depth of Field's Chris Weitz, Andrew Miano and Dan Balgoyen and All Nippon Entertainment Works's Sandy Climan and Annmarie Bailey, and Nippon Television's Naoaki Kitajima.
