= Sayaka Kamiya =

Japanese actress and model

Sayaka Kamiya (神谷涼, Kamiya Sayaka; born April 20, 1982) is a Japanese actress and model. Kamiya is best known for her role as Satomi Noda in the Japanese film Battle Royale (2000). She also played Sena in Man, Next Natural Girl: 100 Nights in Yokohama.
