= Masatō Ibu =

Japanese actor and voice actor (born 1949)

- 伊武 雅刀
- Born: Satoru Murota (室田 悟); March 28, 1949 (age 77); Nakano, Tokyo, Japan
- Status: Married
- Other names: Sen Ibu (伊武 専) (1966–1969); Masami Ibu (伊武 正巳) (1970–1972); Masayuki Ibu (伊武 雅之) (1973–1980)
- Education: Toho High School
- Occupations: Actor, voice actor, narrator, disc jockey, singer
- Years active: 1967–present
- Agent: Papado
- Television: "Space Battleship Yamato" – as Desler and Heikurō Tōdō "Shiroi Kyotō" "Dan Dan" "Fūrinkazan" and Space Carrier Blue Noah as Chūji Shimizu
- Website: ibu-masatoh.com

Masatō Ibu (伊武 雅刀, Ibu Masatō; real name: Satoru Murota (室田 悟, Murota Satoru)) is a Japanese actor and voice actor, Best known for his villainous characters. He is sometimes credited as Masato Eve.

== Filmography ==
=== Films ===
- The Last Hero (1982), Teddy Kataoka
- P.P. Rider (1983)
- Love Hotel (1985)
- Maison Ikkoku (1986)
- Empire of the Sun (1987), Sgt. Nagata
- Sukeban Deka (1987)
- Rex: A Dinosaur's Story (1993)
- Toki o Kakeru Shōjo (1997)
- Dr. Akagi (1998)
- Taboo (1999)
- Godzilla vs. Megaguirus (2000)
- Agitator (2001)
- My Grandpa (2003)
- Onmyoji II (2003)
- Azumi (2003)
- Godzilla: Final Wars (2004), Xillien Commander
- Drugstore Girl (2004), Yamada
- Azumi 2: Death or Love (2005)
- Tetsujin 28-go (2005), Kētarō Taura
- Samurai Commando: Mission 1549 (2005), Saitō Dōsan
- Sway (2006), Isamu Hayakawa
- Saishū Heiki Kanojo: The Last Love Song on this Little Planet (2006), Murase
- Goemon (2009), Tokugawa Ieyasu
- Space Battleship Yamato (2010), Desler (voice)
- Sakurada Gate Incident (2010), Ii Naosuke
- Isoroku (2011), Osami Nagano
- Emperor (2012), Kōichi Kido
- Ask This of Rikyu (2013)
- Shield of Straw (2013), Kenji Sekiya
- Black Butler (2014), Kuzo Shinpei
- A Stitch of Life (2015)
- Black Widow Business (2016)
- Museum (2016), Toshio Okabe
- Flea-picking Samurai (2018)
- Kaiji: Final Game (2020)
- Independence of Japan (2020), Hitoshi Ashida
- A Winter Rose (2022)
- Flames of a Flower (2025)
- Akiramemasen! (2027), Kojiro Murai

=== Television drama ===
- Kashin (1977), Kobayashi Torasaburō
- Kasuga no Tsubone (1989), Ishida Mitsunari
- Hideyoshi (1996), Kuroda Kanbei
- The Great White Tower (2003), Professor Ugai
- Fūrin Kazan (2007), Taigen Sessai
- Detective Conan (2011)
- Crime and Punishment: A Falsified Romance (2012)
- Gunshi Kanbei (2014), Sen no Rikyū
- Do S Deka (2015), Tokuji Kondō
- Kabukimono Keiji (2015)
- Shizumanu Taiyō (2016)
- Beppinsan (2016–17)
- Miotsukushi Ryōrichō (2017)
- Segodon (2018), Tokugawa Nariaki
- Nemesis (2021)
- The Grand Family (2021), Prime Minister Sahashi
- Life's Punchline (2021)
- Isoroku Yamamoto in London (2021), Takayoshi Katō
- Uzukawamura Jiken (2022)
- Ōoku (2024), Tokugawa Yoshimune
- Tanabata no Kuni (2024)
- The Ghost Writer's Wife (2025), head priest of Daio-ji temple

=== Television animation ===
- The Ultraman (1979–1980) as Ultraman Joneus
- Space Battleship Yamato (1973–1983), Desler, Heikurō Tōdō
- Dokaben as Kojiro Inukai (1976–1979)
- Space Carrier Blue Noah (1979–1980)

=== Theatrical animation ===
- Phoenix 2772 (1980), Black Jack
- Tōi Umi kara Kita Coo (1993), Tetsuo Obata
- NiNoKuni (2019), King Flander

=== Dubbing ===
- Battle of the Commandos (1975 NTV edition), Sgt. Karim Habinda (Aldo Sambrell)
- The Mule (2024 BS TV Tokyo edition), Earl Stone (Clint Eastwood)
