= Renji Ishibashi =

Japanese actor (born 1941)

- Born: Renji Ishida; August 9, 1941 (age 85); Shinagawa, Tokyo, Japan
- Occupation: Actor
- Years active: 1964–present
- Spouse: Mako Midori (m. 1979)

Renji Ishibashi (石橋 蓮司, Ishibashi Renji), born Renji Ishida (石田 蓮司, Ishida Renji; born August 9, 1941) is a Japanese actor. He won the award for best supporting actor at the 15th Hochi Film Award for Rōnin-gai.

== Filmography ==
=== Film ===
Year	Film	Role	Notes	Ref
1964	Wolves, Pigs and Men	Hiroshi		
1972	Zatoichi at Large	Gunroku		
1973	Lone Wolf and Cub: Baby Cart in the Land of Demons	Izubuchi Shobei		
1974	Lone Wolf and Cub: White Heaven in Hell			
1974	Ryoma Ansatsu	Nakaoka Shintarō		
1976	Watcher in the Attic	Gōda Saburō		
1978	Mottomo Kiken na Yugi	Mahjong player		
1979	Woman with Red Hair	Kozo		
1979	Oretachi ni Haka wa Nai	Taka		
1980	Onna no Hosomichi: Nureta Kaikyo			
1981	Fruits of Passion	Kato		
1987	Tokyo Blackout	Miyoshi		
1987	Sure Death 4: Revenge	Kohei Yasuda		
1988	Bakayaro! I'm Plenty Mad	Masao Atsugi		
1989	Tetsuo: The Iron Man	Tramp		
1989	Yuwakusha	Tsuburagi		
1990	Rōnin-gai	Gonbei		
1990	Ware ni utsu yoi ari	Akikawa		
1992	The Triple Cross	Imura		
1993	Kozure Ōkami: Sono Chiisaki Te ni			
1994	Crest of Betrayal	Kihei Ito		
1995	The Abe Clan	Hayashi Geki		
1998	The Bird People in China	Ujiie		
1998	Sada			
1998	Pride	Shūmei Ōkawa		
1999	Poppoya	Town Mayor		
1999	Gemini	Beggar Monk		
1999	Dead or Alive	Aoki		
1999	Salaryman Kintaro			
1999	Audition	Old man in wheelchair		
1999	Hissatsu! Shamisenya no Yuji			
2000	Tales of the Unusual	Old Man		
2000	Shinsengumi	Hachiro Kiyokawa		
2000	Pyrokinesis			
2001	Cowboy Bebop: The Movie	Renji (voice)		
2001	Agitator			
2001	Darkness in the Light	Detective Yoshida		
2002	Graveyard of Honor	Denji Yukawa		
2002	Deadly Outlaw: Rekka			
2002	Trick: The Movie	Deity		
2002	Alive	Chief		
2003	Gozu	Boss		
2003	The Man in White			
2004	Half a Confession			
2004	One Missed Call	Detective		
2004	Flower and Snake	Ippei Tashiro		
2004	Moonlight Jellyfish			
2004	Izo			
2005	Spring Snow	Reikichi Kitazaki		
2005	One Missed Call 2	Detective		
2005	The Great Yokai War	Ookubi		
2005	Shinobi: Heart Under Blade	Nankōbō Tenkai		
2005	Kamen Rider The First			
2006	Big Bang Love, Juvenile A			
2007	Sakuran	Owner		
2007	Sukiyaki Western Django	Village Mayor		
2007	Hero			
2008	L: Change the World	Shin Kagami		
2008	Kurosagi			
2008	Tokyo! "Merde"	L'avocat général		
2008	20th Century Boys	Inshu Manjome		
2008	The Ramen Girl	Udagawa		
2009	Kamogawa Horumo	Berobero Bartender		
2009	A Good Husband			
2009	Mt. Tsurugidake	Sakichi Ogata		
2009	20th Century Boys 2: The Last Hope	Inshu Manjome		
2009	20th Century Boys 3: Redemption	Inshu Manjome		
2009	Cho Kamen Rider Den-O & Decade Neo Generations: The Onigashima Warship	Eijiro Hikari		
2009	Kamen Rider Decade: All Riders vs. Dai-Shocker	Eijiro Hikari		
2009	Kamen Rider × Kamen Rider W & Decade: Movie War 2010	Eijiro Hikari		
2010	Outrage	Murase		
2011	Ninja Kids!!!			
2011	The Detective Is in the Bar	Kyosuke Iwabuchi		
2011	Someday			
2011	Koitanibashi			
2012	Hayabusa: Harukanaru Kikan	Ohshita		
2013	Strawberry Night			
2013	I'll Give It My All... Tomorrow			
2013	Human Trust	Detective Kitamura		
2014	Homeland			
2014	Kikaider Reboot	Shinnosuke Tanabe		
2015	The Big Bee			
2015	Kaze ni Tatsu Lion			
2018	The Blood of Wolves	Shōhei Irako		
2018	Samurai's Promise			
2018	Lost in Ramen			
2019	Kingdom	Jie Shi		
2019	Another World	Tameo Iwai		
2019	Walking Man	Tameo Iwai		
2020	Howling Village			
2020	I Never Shot Anyone		Lead role	
2020	Independence of Japan	Kijūrō Shidehara		
2021	Angry Rice Wives			
2021	The Blue Danube			
2021	The Great Yokai War: Guardians	Ōkubi		
2021	Nishinari Goro's 400 Million Yen			
2021	99.9 Criminal Lawyer: The Movie	Shōzō Wakatsuki		
2022	The Broken Commandment			
2022	A Winter Rose	Tatsuo Okishima		
2022	Haw	Jirō Sekine		
2022	How to Find Happiness			
2023	Baian the Assassin, M.D. 2			
2023	As Long as We Both Shall Live	The emperor		
2023	Okiku and the World	Magoshichi		
2023	We're Broke, My Lord!	Nishina the lord of Settsu		
2023	Revolver Lily			
2024	The Ohara Family Rhapsody			
2024	Kaze yo Arashi yo	Masatarō Watanabe		
2026	Samurai Vengeance	Takigawa		
2026	Goodbye, My Loved Ones!	Kazuo Yamada		
2026	The Specials	Honjo		
2027	A List for Tomorrow		Taiwanese-Japanese film	

=== Television ===
Year	Title	Role	Notes	Ref
1974	Katsu Kaishū	Yoshida Shōin	Taiga drama	
1979	Oretachi wa Tenshi da!	Carlos	Episode20	
1980	Shadow Warriors	Minakuchi Kisirō		
1987	Dokuganryū Masamune	Yagyū Munenori	Taiga drama	
1995	Kumokiri Nizaemon	Kinezumi no Kichigoro		
2001	Hojo Tokimune	Hojo Tokihiro	Taiga drama	
2003	Kōshōnin	Counselor Kanemoto		
2005	Yoshitsune	Togashi Yasuie	Taiga drama	
2006	My Boss My Hero	Tōjūrō Yazaki		
2007	Fūrin Kazan	Ihara Tadatane	Taiga drama	
2007	Onward Towards Our Noble Deaths	Company commander	TV movie	
2009	Kamen Rider Decade	Eijiro Hikari	Tokusatsu series	
2010	Ryōmaden	Nagai Naoyuki	Taiga drama	
2011	Job Hopper Buy a House	Kazuyoshi Asaoka		
2014	Hanako and Anne	Shuzo Ando	Asadora	
2017	Henkan Kōshōnin	Chōbyō Yara		
2018	Innocent Days			
2018	Segodon	Kawaguchi Seppō	Taiga drama	
2020	13 Assassins		TV movie	
2020	The Sun Stands Still: The Eclipse		Mini-series	
2020–21	Awaiting Kirin	Sanjōnishi Sanezumi	Taiga drama	
2021	Ryūkō Kanbō		TV movie	
2021	The Naked Director	Watabe	Season 2	
2021	Nakamura Nakazo: Shusse no Kizahashi		Mini-series	
2021	Japan Sinks: People of Hope	Gen Satoshiro		
2022	Kaze yo Arashi yo	Masatarō Watanabe	TV movie	
2023	Informa	Kento Ishigami		
2025	Anpan	Mitsuru Horii	Asadora	
2026	Straight to Hell			

=== Video game ===
- Yakuza: Dead Souls - Oyassan
