= Gozu =

2003 Japanese film by Takashi Miike

- Promotional release poster
- Directed by: Takashi Miike
- Written by: Sakichi Sato
- Produced by: Kana Koido; Harumi Sone
- Starring: Hideki Sone; Show Aikawa
- Cinematography: Kazunari Tanaka
- Edited by: Yasushi Shimamura
- Music by: Kôji Endô
- Distributed by: Cinema Epoch
- Release date: 12 July 2003
- Running time: 129 minutes
- Country: Japan
- Language: Japanese
- Box office: $58,202

Gozu (極道恐怖大劇場 牛頭 ＧＯＺＵ, Gokudō kyōfu dai-gekijō: Gozu; literally: Yakuza Horror Theatre: Bull's Head) is a 2003 Japanese surrealist film directed by Takashi Miike and written by Sakichi Sato. Starring Hideki Sone and Show Aikawa, the film follows a yakuza enforcer dispatched to kill his unstable superior, only to lose the body and become ensnared in a succession of increasingly bizarre events in a desolate suburb of Nagoya. Shot on a low budget and originally intended for direct-to-video release, the film screened at the 2003 Cannes Film Festival, which secured its theatrical release overseas. It received mixed reviews from critics.

== Plot ==
Ozaki, a mentally unstable yakuza, kills a chihuahua outside a restaurant after becoming convinced that it is an attack dog trained to kill gangsters. Seeing Ozaki as a security risk, the head of the Azamawari yakuza clan orders fellow underling Minami to kill him and dispose of the body at a company depot.

Reluctant to carry out the order, Minami accidentally causes Ozaki's death by pushing him to the ground while trying to stop him from attacking an innocent woman he has mistaken for an assassin. After the road he is driving along mysteriously gives way to a large lake, Minami stops at a coffee shop to use the phone. A complimentary chawanmushi makes him violently ill, and when he returns from the bathroom he finds that Ozaki's body has vanished. The townspeople prove largely evasive and uncooperative, and Minami sets out to search a nearly deserted, run-down suburb of Nagoya in an attempt to recover it, becoming caught up in a series of surreal encounters. He meets an elderly innkeeper obsessed with her breast milk, her brother who claims to channel spirits, a waiter who died three years earlier in a car accident, and the titular Gozu — a mysterious figure with the head of a cow — who appears to him in a dream. At a junkyard, Minami is told that Ozaki was murdered and turned into a skin suit. Returning to his car, he finds a young woman who claims to be Ozaki. After she recounts intimate details of his life and one of his dreams, he believes her.

Minami and the female Ozaki spend the night at a hotel, where Minami hears what sounds like a voice emanating from within her while she sleeps. She wakes and propositions him; he declines.

The following day, Minami drives the female Ozaki back to his gang's office intending to explain the situation to his boss. Upon arrival, however, she claims to be the daughter of a deceased rival boss and asks to enter the clan's service.

The boss takes her to his private office, leaving Minami outside. Minami eventually forces his way back in and confronts his boss; during the ensuing struggle, the boss falls and impales himself on a ladle handle he had inserted into his anus — apparently his only means of achieving an erection — and achieves orgasm. Minami then electrocutes the unconscious boss using exposed wiring from a light fitting and leaves with the female Ozaki.

Back at Minami's home, the two begin to have sex at her urging. Something inside her latches onto him, and as he recoils, a human hand emerges from within her. The original, male Ozaki then extricates himself from her body as Minami cowers in the corner.

In the film's final scene, Minami, the male Ozaki, and the female Ozaki walk down the street together, arms linked.

== Cast ==
- Hideki Sone as Minami
- Show Aikawa as Ozaki
- Kimika Yoshino as Female Ozaki
- Shōhei Hino as Nose
- Keiko Tomita as Innkeeper
- Harumi Sone as Innkeeper's Brother
- Renji Ishibashi as Boss

== Release ==
Shot on a low budget, the film was originally planned for direct-to-video release on DVD. Its positive reception at the Cannes Film Festival in May 2003, however, secured its theatrical release overseas.

== Critical reception ==
On the review aggregator website Rotten Tomatoes, the film holds an approval rating of 72% based on 57 reviews. On Metacritic, which uses a weighted average, it has a score of 58 out of 100 based on 19 critics, indicating "mixed or average reviews".

Michael O'Sullivan of The Washington Post wrote that the film "makes little sense on paper" but "somehow feels richly, hilariously real, even — at its most bizarre — familiar." Ty Burr of The Boston Globe called it "creatively unhinged" and "not your average midnight movie but something more hermetic." Jay Boyar of the Orlando Sentinel opined that "there is something compelling about the way this film sneakily taps into our collective psychosexual fantasies." Dennis Lim of The Village Voice wrote favorably that the film "substitutes a simmering absurdism (enhanced by Koji Endo's rumbling, dissonant score)" in place of Miike's more characteristic ultraviolence.

A. O. Scott of The New York Times wrote that for Miike's existing fans the film would serve as "an indispensable compendium of outtakes and sketches," while for others it would be "a mystifying and provocative introduction to his unnerving, wanton and prodigious imagination." Stephen Hunter, also writing in The Washington Post, judged the film to be "not in line with [Miike's] best work." G. Allen Johnson of SFGate declared it "for Miike freaks only (and you know who you are). Everyone else: Stay far, far away." Jeff Shannon of The Seattle Times called the film "an undisciplined mess" that "trades Lynch's nightmare logic for exasperating incoherence."
