= Takashi Miike =

Japanese filmmaker (born 1960)

- Miike in 2026
- Born: 24 August 1960 (age 66); Yao, Osaka Prefecture, Japan
- Education: Japan Institute of the Moving Image
- Occupations: Film director; screenwriter; producer; actor
- Years active: 1991–present
- Partner: Misako Saka

Japanese name
- Kanji: 三池 崇史
- Hiragana: みいけ たかし
- Katakana: ミイケ タカシ
Transcriptions
- Romanization: Miike Takashi

Takashi Miike (三池 崇史, Miike Takashi; born 24 August 1960) is a Japanese filmmaker and actor. He has directed over 100 films and television productions, in a variety of genres such as action, children's films, comedy, drama, horror, musicals, and jidaigeki period dramas.

He is best known internationally for the horror films Audition (1999), Ichi the Killer (2001), Visitor Q (2001), Gozu (2003), and One Missed Call (2003). He is also known for samurai and yakuza films such as Dead or Alive (1999), Graveyard of Honor (2002), 13 Assassins (2010), earning a Japan Academy Film Prize nomination for Director of the Year, and Hara-Kiri: Death of a Samurai (2011). He has also acted in more than 20 films.

Miike spent much of his career as a controversial figure who had several of his films criticized for their extreme graphic violence and other transgressive content, especially Ichi the Killer, which was banned in several countries. However, in his later career, he shifted towards work more acceptable to the mainstream; his films Hara-Kiri and Straw Shield (2013) were both nominated for the Palme d'Or at the Cannes Film Festival, while both Sukiyaki Western Django (2007) and 13 Assassins were nominated for the Venice Film Festival's Golden Lion. Several of his films have developed cult followings.

== Early life and education ==
Miike was born in Yao, Osaka, on August 24, 1960. His mother was a seamstress and his father was a welder. His father was born in Seoul, which was then part of Japanese Korea, as his paternal grandfather was stationed in Korea and China during World War II. He was interested in motorcycles during his childhood, and considered racing professionally. He graduated from Jōshō Gakuen Junior and Senior High School.

At the age of 18, he joined the Yokohama Vocational School of Broadcast and Film (now the Japan Institute of the Moving Image), where he came under the guidance of the school's founder Shohei Imamura. When a local television company came looking for unpaid interns on a production, he was nominated by the school, despite his later claim that he only rarely attended classes.

== Career ==
Miike's first films were television productions, but he also began directing several direct-to-video V-Cinema releases. He still intermittently directs these due to the creative freedom afforded by the less stringent censorship of the medium and the riskier content that producers will allow.

Miike's theatrical debut was the film The Third Gangster (Daisan no gokudō), but Shinjuku Triad Society (1995) was his first theatrical release to gain public attention. The film showcased his extreme style and his recurring themes, and its success allowed him to work on higher-budgeted pictures. Shinjuku Triad Society was the first film in what is labeled his "Black Society Trilogy", which also includes Rainy Dog (1997) and Ley Lines (1999).

Miike gained international fame in the early 2000s when his horror film Audition (1999), his violent yakuza epic Dead or Alive (1999), and his controversial 2001 adaptation of the manga Ichi the Killer all played at international film festivals. He gained a strong cult following in the West that grew with the increase in DVD releases of his works. During the international premiere of Ichi the Killer at the 2001 Toronto International Film Festival, the audience received "barf bags" emblazoned with the film's logo as a promotional gimmick. The BBFC refused to allow the release of the film uncut in the United Kingdom, citing its extreme levels of sexual violence towards women, and it required just over three minutes of footage to be removed before its release. In Hong Kong, 17 minutes of footage were cut. The film was outright banned in Germany, Malaysia, and Norway.

In 2005, Miike was invited to direct an episode of the anthology series Masters of Horror, intended to provide horror directors with creative freedom and relaxed restrictions on violent and sexual content. However, when Showtime acquired the rights to the series, Miike's episode "Imprint" was deemed too disturbing for broadcast. Showtime cancelled it from the broadcast lineup even after extended negotiations, though it was retained as part of the series' DVD release. Mick Garris, creator and executive producer of the series, described the episode as "amazing [but] hard to watch" and "definitely the most disturbing" production he had ever seen. "Imprint" has yet to air in the United States but was shown on Bravo in the United Kingdom, Nelonen in Finland, Rai Tre in Italy, and FX in multiple other countries. Anchor Bay Entertainment, which handled the American DVD releases for Masters of Horror, released the episode uncut on September 26, 2006.

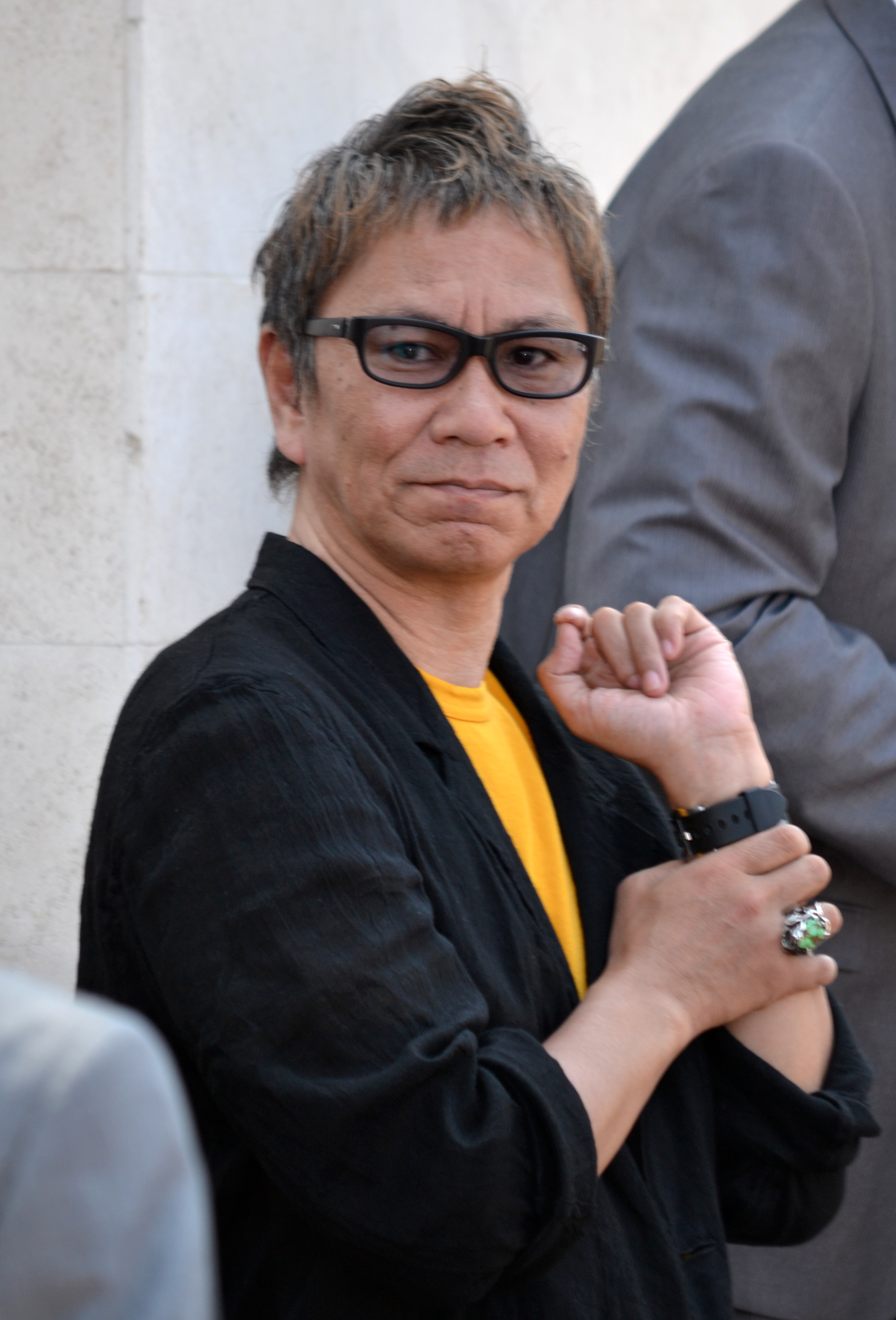
Miike in 2011

In his later career, Miike has shifted towards work more acceptable to the mainstream; his samurai film Hara-Kiri: Death of a Samurai (2011) premiered in competition at the 2011 Cannes Film Festival and his spy thriller film Straw Shield (2013) was nominated for the Palme d'Or at the 2013 Cannes Film Festival.

=== Stage directing ===
In 2005, Miike directed a Kabuki-style play titled Demon Pond. The DVD recording of the performance was released by Cinema Epoch.

Miike directed the play Zatoichi based on the eponymous character. The stage production was performed and filmed on December 12, 2007, and the DVD was released on May 30, 2008.

== Artistry ==
=== Style ===
Miike achieved notoriety for depicting shocking scenes of extreme violence and sexual perversions. Many of his films contain graphic and lurid bloodshed, portrayed in an over-the-top and cartoonish manner. Much of his work depicts the activities of criminals, especially yakuza, or concern themselves with gaijin (foreigners living in Japan). He is known for his films' dark comedy and for pushing the boundaries of censorship.

Miike has directed films in a range of genres. He has created lighthearted children's films (Ninja Kids!!!, The Great Yokai War), period pieces (Sabu), a road movie (The Bird People in China), a teen drama (Andromedia), a farcical musical comedy horror (The Happiness of the Katakuris), video game adaptations (Like a Dragon, Ace Attorney), manga adaptations (Blade of the Immortal, Jojo's Bizarre Adventure: Diamond Is Unbreakable, Terra Formars, The Mole Song Trilogy) and character driven crime dramas (Ley Lines, Agitator).

While Miike often creates films that are less accessible and target arthouse audiences and fans of extreme cinema, such as Izo and the "Box" segment in Three... Extremes, he has created several mainstream and commercial titles such as the horror film One Missed Call and the fantasy drama The Great Yokai War.

Reflecting his unusual approach to filmmaking, Miike has said of his career:

I became a director because I didn't have another choice. I dreamed of becoming a motorbike racer because I love motorbikes a lot. I think anyone can become a director, especially if you have money. Even Haruki Kadokawa became a director. To become a famous musician is also a way to become a director and, like Takeshi Kitano, achieving fame as a comedian and then becoming a director gives you a lot of freedom. There are so many ways to become a director. If there is a 1–10 scale for talent, then a 10-point talent is a director, but a one-point person can also become a director if he has the talent to make the right contacts. In motorbike racing, on the other hand, the winner is always an extreme talent. Even if we train a lot, we can't beat them. I admire that kind of world. But I didn't have a choice. I never thought about becoming a director before. I considered the occupation of film director as being for the intelligentsia.

=== Influences ===
Miike cited the American science-fiction action film Starship Troopers (1997) as his favorite film. He has expressed admiration for fellow Japanese filmmakers Akira Kurosawa and Hideo Gosha. He named American filmmaker David Lynch as his favorite director from the English-speaking world, and cited Dutch filmmaker Paul Verhoeven (who directed Starship Troopers) as the director who fascinates him the most. He also said that he likes Canadian filmmaker David Cronenberg.

== Personal life ==
Miike rarely discusses his private life. He is in a long-term relationship with his longtime producing partner Misako Saka.

== Filmography ==
=== Film ===
==== Theatrical films ====
Year	English title	Japanese title	Notes
1995	The Third Gangster	第三の極道	
1995	Shinjuku Triad Society	新宿黒社会 チャイナ マフィア戦争	
1996	Fudoh: The New Generation	極道戦国志 不動	
1997	Young Thugs: Innocent Blood	岸和田少年愚連隊 血煙り純情篇	
1997	Rainy Dog	極道黒社会	
1998	The Bird People in China	中国の鳥人	
1998	Andromedia	アンドロメディア	
1998	Blues Harp	—N/a	
1998	Young Thugs: Nostalgia	岸和田少年愚連隊・望郷	
1999	Ley Lines	日本黒社会 LEY LINES	
1999	Audition	オーディション	
1999	Dead or Alive	DEAD OR ALIVE: 犯罪者	
1999	Salaryman Kintaro	サラリーマン金太郎	
2000	The City of Lost Souls	漂流街	
2000	The Guys from Paradise	天国から来た男たち	
2000	Dead or Alive 2: Birds	DEAD OR ALIVE 2: 逃亡者	
2001	Family	家族	Also cinematographer
2001	Visitor Q	ビジターQ	
2001	Ichi the Killer	殺し屋1	
2001	Agitator	荒ぶる魂たち	
2001	The Happiness of the Katakuris	カタクリ家の幸福	
2002	Dead or Alive: Final	—N/a	
2002	Kumamoto Stories	熊本物語	
2002	Graveyard of Honor	新・仁義の墓場	
2002	Shangri-La	金融破滅ニッポン 桃源郷の人々	
2002	Deadly Outlaw: Rekka	実録・安藤昇侠道伝 烈火	
2003	The Man in White	許されざる者	Two-part film
2003	Gozu	極道恐怖大劇場 牛頭 GOZU	
2003	One Missed Call	着信アリ	
2004	Zebraman	ゼブラーマン	
2004	Three... Extremes	美しい夜、残酷な朝	Segment: "Box"
2004	Izo	—N/a	
2005	The Great Yokai War	妖怪大戦争	Also writer
2006	Big Bang Love, Juvenile A	46億年の恋	
2006	Waru	悪	
2006	Waru: The End	悪完結編	
2006	Sun Scarred	太陽の傷	
2007	Like a Dragon	龍が如く 劇場版	
2007	Sukiyaki Western Django	スキヤキ・ウエスタン ジャンゴ	Also writer
2007	Detective Story	探偵物語	
2007	Crows Zero	クローズZERO	
2008	Zatoichi	三池崇史 × 哀川翔 『座頭市』	
2008	God's Puzzle	神様のパズル	
2009	Yatterman	ヤッターマン	
2009	Crows Zero 2	クローズZERO II	
2010	Zebraman 2: Attack on Zebra City	ゼブラーマン -ゼブラシティの逆襲	
2010	13 Assassins	十三人の刺客	
2011	Hara-Kiri: Death of a Samurai	一命	
2011	Ninja Kids!!!	忍たま乱太郎	
2012	Ace Attorney	逆転裁判	
2012	For Love's Sake	愛と誠	
2012	Lesson of the Evil	悪の教典	
2013	Shield of Straw	藁の楯	
2013	The Mole Song: Undercover Agent Reiji	土竜の唄 潜入捜査官 REIJI	
2014	Over Your Dead Body	喰女-クイメ-	
2014	As the Gods Will	神さまの言うとおり	
2015	The Lion Standing in the Wind	風に立つライオン	
2015	Yakuza Apocalypse	極道大戦争	
2016	Terra Formars	テラフォーマーズ	
2016	The Mole Song: Hong Kong Capriccio	土竜の唄 香港狂騒曲	
2017	Blade of the Immortal	無限の住人	
2017	JoJo's Bizarre Adventure: Diamond Is Unbreakable – Chapter 1	ジョジョの奇妙な冒険 ダイヤモンドは砕けない 第一章	
2018	Laplace's Witch	ラプラスの魔女	
2019	First Love	初恋	
2019	That Moment, My Heart Cried	その瞬間、僕は泣きたくなった	Segment: "Beautiful"
2020	Secret × Heroine Phantomirage! ~We've Become a Movie~	劇場版 ひみつ×戦士 ファントミラージュ！ ～映画になってちょーだいします～	
2021	Police x Heroine Lovepatrina! ~Challenge from a Phantom Thief! Let's Arrest with Love and a Pat!~	劇場版 ポリス×戦士 ラブパトリーナ！ ～怪盗からの挑戦！ ラブでパパッとタイホせよ！～	
2021	The Great Yokai War: Guardians	妖怪大戦争 ガーディアンズ	
2021	The Mole Song: Final	土竜の唄 FINAL	
2023	Lumberjack the Monster	怪物の木こり	
2024	Midnight	ミッドナイト	Short film
2025	Sham	でっちあげ	
2025	Blazing Fists	Blue Fight 〜蒼き若者たちのブレイキングダウン〜	
2026	Bad Lieutenant: Tokyo	—N/a	
TBA	Untitled film		

==== Direct-to-video ====
Year	English title	Japanese title	Notes
1991	Lady Hunter: Prelude to Murder	レディハンター 殺しのプレリュード	
1991	Eyecatch Junction	突風!ミニパト隊	
1992	A Human Murder Weapon	人間兇器 愛と怒りのリング	
1993	Bodyguard Kiba	ボディガード牙	
1993	We're No Angels	俺達は天使じゃない	
1993	We're No Angels 2	俺達は天使じゃない2	
1994	Shinjuku Outlaw	新宿アウトロー	
1994	Bodyguard Kiba: Apocalypse of Carnage	修羅の黙示録 ボディーガード牙	
1995	Bodyguard Kiba: Apocalypse of Carnage 2	修羅の黙示録2 ボディーガード牙	
1995	Osaka Tough Guys	なにわ遊侠伝	
1996	New Third Gangster	新・第三の極道	
1996	New Third Gangster II	新・第三の極道II	
1996	Ambition Without Honor	仁義なき野望	
1996	Peanuts	落華星 ピイナッツ	
1996	The Way to Fight	喧嘩の花道	
1997	Ambition Without Honor 2	仁義なき野望2	
1997	Full Metal Yakuza	FULL METAL 極道	
1999	Silver	シルバー	
2000	The Making of "Gemini"	塚本晋也が乱歩する	
2001	Family 2	家族2	
2003	Kikoku	鬼哭	
2005	Demon Pond	夜叉ヶ池	Filmed stage production
2007	Pledge to Peace	平和への誓い	Animated short, Also editor

=== Television ===
==== Live-action series and miniseries ====
Year	English title	Japanese title	Notes
1999	Man, A Natural Girl	天然少女 萬	
1999	Man, Next Natural Girl: 100 Nights in Yokohama	天然少女萬NEXT-横浜百夜篇	
2000	MPD Psycho	多重人格探偵サイコ/雨宮一彦の帰還	
2005	Ultraman Max	ウルトラマンマックス	Episodes 15 and 16
2006	Masters of Horror		Episode "Imprint"
2008	K-tai Investigator 7	ケータイ捜査官7	3 episodes (Also supervising producer)
2011	QP	QP	Directed 5 out of 12 episodes
2017	Idol × Warrior Miracle Tunes!	アイドル×戦士 ミラクルちゅーんず!	General director
2018	Magical × Heroine Magimajo Pures!	魔法×戦士 マジマジョピュアーズ!	General director
2019	Secret × Heroine Phantomirage!	ひみつ×戦士 ファントミラージュ!	General director
2020	Police × Heroine Lovepatrina!	ポリス×戦士 ラブパトリーナ!	General director
2021	Bittomo × Heroine Kirameki Powers!	ビッ友×戦士 キラメキパワーズ!	General director
2022	RizSta -Top of Artists!-	リズスタ -Top of Artists!-	General director
2022	Connect	커넥트	OTT Drama
2023	Assistant Inspector: Daimajin	警部補ダイマジン	Directed 6 out of 8 episodes
2025	Masked Ninja Akakage	仮面の忍者 赤影	Directed 4 out of 10 episodes
2026	Mt. Fuji Erupts: Are We Prepared?	富士山大噴火 迫る"灰色の悪夢"	2-part miniseries, directed the drama segments

==== TV movies ====
Year	Title	Japanese title	Notes
1992	Last Run: 100 Million Yen's Worth of Love & Betrayal / The Rampaging Ferrari 250 GTO	ラスト・ラン～愛と裏切りの百億円/疾走フェラーリ250GTO	
2002	Sabu	SABU 〜さぶ〜	
2002	Part-Time Detective	パートタイム探偵	
2003	Negotiator	交渉人	
2004	Part-Time Detective 2	パートタイム探偵2	
2025	Shin Abarenbō Shōgun	新・暴れん坊将軍	

==== Anime series ====
- Onimusha (2023) (chief director)
- Nyaight of the Living Cat (2025) (chief director)

==== Commercials ====
- 地球兄弟 (Chikyu kyodai) (Blue Planet Brothers) (2013), ten 6-minute commercials for Japan Tobacco
- Midnight (2024), short online film for iPhone 15 Pro

=== Music videos ===
- Pandōra (2002)

=== Acting roles ===
==== Film ====
Year	Title	Role	Notes
1997	Young Thugs: Innocent Blood	Man in Red Trousers	
2001	Agitator	Shinozaki	
2002	Graveyard of Honor	Restaurant gunman	
2002	Ichi the Killer: Episode 0	Kakihara (voice)	
2003	Last Life in the Universe	Yakuza	
2005	The Neighbor No. Thirteen	Kaneda	
2005	Hostel	Miike Takashi	
2006	Gekijōban Dōbutsu no Mori	Rokusuke/Pascal (voice)	
2024	Midnight	Kaede's father	Short
2024	Chain Reactions	Himself	Documentary
2026	The Chain of Roses		

==== Television ====
Year	Title	Role	Notes
2009	Tenchijin	Hyogo Kariyasu	Taiga drama

==== Video games ====
Year	Title	Notes
2010	No More Heroes 2: Desperate Struggle	Himself
2021	No More Heroes III	Likeness only. Voiced by Stephen Oyoung.

== Bibliography ==
- Mes, Tom. Agitator: The Cinema of Takashi Miike. Godalming: FAB Press, 2003. ISBN 1903254213
- Williams, Tony. "Takashi Miike's Cinema of Outrage." cineACTION 64 (2004): 54–62
- "Izo: Takashi Miike's History Lesson." Asian Cinema 16.2 (2005): 85–109.
- Gerow, Aaron. "The Homelessness of Style and the Problems of Studying Miike Takashi." Canadian Journal of Film Studies 18.1 (2009): 24–43
- Black, Art (2003). "Takashi Miike Revisited". Asian Cult Cinema. 38 (1st Quarter): 12–17.
