= The Happiness of the Katakuris =

2001 film by Takashi Miike

- Theatrical release poster
- Directed by: Takashi Miike
- Screenplay by: Kikumi Yamagishi
- Produced by: Hirotsugu Yoshida; Tetsuo Sasho
- Starring: Kenji Sawada; Keiko Matsuzaka; Shinji Takeda; Naomi Nishida; Kiyoshiro Imawano; Tetsurō Tamba
- Cinematography: Hideo Yamamoto
- Edited by: Yasushi Shimamura
- Music by: Koji Endo; Kouji Makaino
- Production company: Shochiku
- Release dates: October 2001 (Tokyo International Film Festival); 16 February 2002 (Japan)
- Running time: 113 minutes
- Country: Japan
- Language: Japanese

The Happiness of the Katakuris (カタクリ家の幸福, Katakuri-ke no Kōfuku) is a 2001 Japanese musical comedy horror film directed by Takashi Miike, with screenplay by Kikumi Yamagishi. It is loosely based on the South Korean film The Quiet Family. The film is a surreal horror-comedy in the farce tradition, which includes claymation sequences, musical and dance numbers, a karaoke-style sing-along scene, and dream sequences.

The film won a Special Jury Prize for its director at the 2004 Gérardmer Film Festival and has received generally positive reviews from critics.

== Plot ==
The Katakuris are a four-generation family of failures: patriarch Masao Katakuri (Kenji Sawada), his wife Terue (Keiko Matsuzaka), his father Jinpei (Tetsurō Tamba), his formerly criminal son Masayuki (Shinji Takeda), his divorced daughter Shizue (Naomi Nishida), her child Yurie (Tamaki Miyazaki, who narrates the film), and their dog, Pochi. The family uses the father's redundancy pay to purchase a large old home situated on a former garbage dump near Mount Fuji that they have named the "White Lovers' Inn". They have the intention of converting it into a bed and breakfast-style guesthouse, since the road running nearby is supposed to be expanded up to the house, which would bring many guests and tourists. However, the road hasn't been expanded yet and the Katakuris subsequently have no guests. When one finally shows up, he commits suicide during the night, and the Katakuris make the decision to save their business by burying the body and concealing the death. The second guest, a Sumo wrestler, also dies of a heart attack during a tryst with his much younger girlfriend, who also dies.

Somehow, each of their guests ends up dead—by suicide, accident or murder—and pretty soon the bodies in the back yard begin to pile up. The Katakuris soon find themselves sucked into a nightmare of lies and fear.

Meanwhile, the recently divorced daughter falls in love with a man calling himself Richard Sagawa (Kiyoshiro Imawano), a U.S. naval officer who claims to be the nephew of Queen Elizabeth II herself. Just when Richard stumbles onto a clue that might lead him to uncover the string of disappearing guests, a nearby volcano begins rumbling to life.

== Cast ==
Actor	Role
Kenji Sawada	Masao Katakuri
Keiko Matsuzaka	Terue Katakuri
Shinji Takeda	Masayuki Katakuri
Naomi Nishida	Shizue Katakuri
Kiyoshiro Imawano	Richard Sagawa
Tetsurō Tamba	Jinpei Katakuri
Naoto Takenaka	Television Reporter
Tamaki Miyazaki	Yurie Katakuri
Takashi Matsuzaki	Utanoumi

== Release ==
The Happiness of the Katakuris was first shown in Japan at the Tokyo International Film Festival in October 2001. The Happiness of the Katakuris was released theatrically in Japan on 16 February 2002.

== Reception ==
On Rotten Tomatoes, the film has an approval rating of 69%, based on 32 reviews, with an average rating of 6.3/10. The site's critical consensus reads: "If nothing else, Happiness of the Katakuris scores points for its delirious, over-the-top originality." On Metacritic, the film has a weighted average score of 60 out of 100, based on 11 critics, indicating "Mixed or average reviews". Kim Newman (Sight & Sound) stated: "Like many of Miike's efforts...[the film] feels all too much like the work of someone who had seven other films on his mind, not all of which he crams into his current project". Newman commented on the acting, noting: "The performances are all fine, but the individual players sometimes seem to be competing for screen space rather than building an ensemble." The review found that the "one-damn-thing-after-another progression straggles on a reel too long, delaying the inevitable and pleasing volcanic eruption finale with a hostage-taking psychopath who only pops in to drag things out until the big bang."

A second review in Sight & Sound described the film as "Wilful, kitsch and eccentric" and "Miike's oddest and most infuriating film yet."

== See also ==
- List of cult films
