= Kenichi Endō =

Japanese actor and writer (born 1961)

- 遠藤 憲一
- Born: 28 June 1961 (age 65); Shinagawa, Tokyo, Japan
- Occupations: Actor, writer
- Years active: 1979–present
- Agent: EN's Tower
- Website: www2u.biglobe.ne.jp/~ENS/

Kenichi Endō (遠藤 憲一, Endō Ken'ichi; born June 28, 1961) is a Japanese actor and writer. He also worked as a narrator for many documentaries, both on television and film. He is best known for his roles in Visitor Q (2001), Crows Zero (2007), Crows Zero 2 (2009), and The Raid 2: Berandal (2014). He is also known for his yakuza roles, such as Joji Yazaki, the head of Soshu Family Syndicate and the main antagonist of Crows Zero and Crows Zero 2, and Hideaki Goto, the head of the Goto family, a powerful yakuza family from Japan and one of two mob bosses that control Jakarta in The Raid 2: Berandal.

== Filmography ==
=== Films ===
- Violent Cop (1989)
- All Under the Moon (1993)
- Jubaku: Spellbound (1999)
- Dead or Alive 2: Birds (2000), Kōhei
- Tomie: Replay (2000), Dr. Tachibana
- Family (2001)
- Agitator (2001)
- Visitor Q (2001), Kiyoshi Yamasaki
- The Guys from Paradise (2001), Toshiyuki Umino
- Deadly Outlaw: Rekka (2002)
- Sabu (2002), Giichi
- Kikoku (2003), Sorimachi
- The Man in White (2003), Niimi
- Tokusou Sentai Dekaranger The Movie: Full Blast Action (2004), Algolian Volger
- Nobody Knows (2004), Kyōbashi
- The Great Yokai War (2005), Oh Tengu
- Cromartie High - The Movie (2005), Pootan
- Azumi 2 (2005), Kinkaku
- Demon Pond (2005), Giant Crab / Representative
- Origin: Spirits of the Past (2006), Shunack
- Big Bang Love, Juvenile A (2006), assistant police inspector
- Nihon Chinbotsu (2006), Shinichirō Nakata
- Memories of Tomorrow (2006), Hasegawa
- The Sword of Alexander (2007), Gonzō
- Like a Dragon (2007), Imanishi
- Crows Zero (2007), Jōji Yazaki
- Happy Ever After (2007)
- SS (2008), Kurihara
- Climber's High (2008)
- 20th Century Boys 1: Beginning of the End (2008)
- 20th Century Boys 3: Redemption (2009)
- Crows Zero 2 (2009), Jōji Yazaki
- Railways (2010), Yoshiki Kawahira
- The Raid 2 (2014), Hideaki Gotō
- The Mole Song: Undercover Agent Reiji (2014)
- Kiyamachi Daruma (2015), Shigeo Katsuura
- Galaxy Turnpike (2015)
- The Mole Song: Hong Kong Capriccio (2016)
- Usagi Oishi (2016), Katsusaburō Yamagiwa
- Mixed Doubles (2017), Motonobu Ochiai
- Mary and the Witch's Flower (2017), Zebedee
- Out and Out (2018)
- Come Kiss Me at 0:00 AM (2019)
- Sumodo (2020), narrator
- The Supporting Actors: The Movie (2021), himself
- The Great Yokai War: Guardians (2021), Yadōkai
- Jigoku no Hanazono: Office Royale (2021)
- The Mole Song: Final (2021)
- Radiation House: The Movie (2022), Toshio Onodera
- Kubi (2023), Araki Murashige
- All About Suomi (2024), Daikichi Totoyama
- Honeko Akabane's Bodyguards (2024), Masahito Jingū
- Doctor-X: The Movie (2024), Takashi Ebina
- My Special One (2025), himself
- Brand New Landscape (2025)
- Beethoven Fabrication (2025), Franz Gerhard Wegeler
- Angel Flight: The Movie (2026), Shiro Kashiwagi

=== TV dramas ===
- Battle Fever J (1979), Yoshio Murano
- Taiyō ni Hoero! (1986) episode.718(Final episode)
- Special Rescue Exceedraft (1992), Seiji Nagai
- Tokusou Robo Janperson (1993), Doctor Saionji
- Ninja Sentai Kakuranger (1994), Prince Junior
- Hōjō Tokimune (2001), Miura Mitsumura
- Kōshōnin (2003)
- Lion-Maru G (2006), Junior
- The Waste Land (2009)
- Teppan (2010–2011), Jō Murakami
- Taira no Kiyomori (2012), Hōjō Tokimasa
- Doctor-X: Surgeon Michiko Daimon (2013-2021), Takashi Ebina
- Andō Lloyd: A.I. knows Love? (2013), Isaku Ashimo
- Border: Keishichô Sôsa Ikka Satsujinhan Sôsa Dai 4-gakkari (2014)
- Yamegoku: Yakuza Yamete Itadakimasu (2015), Isao Tachibana
- Dr. Rintarō (2015), Shigeto Araki
- Wise and Foolish (2015), Taizan Mutō
- Sanada Maru (2016), Uesugi Kagekatsu
- Montage (2016), Jirō Sekiguchi
- The Supporting Actors (2017), himself
- Warotenka (2017), Gihei Fujioka
- Tales of the Bizarre 2017 Spring Special (2017), Yoichiro Narita
- The Supporting Actors 2 (2018), himself
- Magic x Warrior Magi Majo Pures! (2018), Jama Danshaku
- Kuroido Goroshi (2018), Rokusuke Kuroido
- Segodon (2018), Katsu Kaishū
- Radiation House (2019–2021), Toshio Onodera
- Talio (2020)
- The Supporting Actors 3 (2021), himself
- Shimura Ken to Drif no Daibakushō Monogatari (2021), Chosuke Ikariya
- Don't Call It Mystery (2022), Kanzō Yabu
- The Days (2023)
- Angel Flight (2023), Shiro Kashiwagi
- The Big Chase: Tokyo SSBC Files (2025) Masao Yaegashi
- Blossom (2026), Daizaburo Kurosaki

=== Video games ===
- Onimusha 3: Demon Siege (2005), Gargant (Japanese voice)
- Onimusha: Dawn of Dreams (2006), Gargant (Japanese voice)
- Yakuza 4 (2010), Junji Sugiuchi (voice and likeness)
- Binary Domain (2012), Officer Phillips (Japanese voice)
- Let It Die (2017), Narration (Japanese voice)

=== Japanese dubbing ===
- Guardians of the Galaxy (2014), Groot
- Guardians of the Galaxy Vol. 2 (2017), Groot
- Avengers: Infinity War (2018), Groot
- Ralph Breaks the Internet (2018), Groot
- Avengers: Endgame (2019), Groot
- Thor: Love and Thunder (2022), Groot
- The Guardians of the Galaxy Holiday Special (2022), Groot
- Guardians of the Galaxy Vol. 3 (2023), Groot

== Awards ==
2009
- International Drama Festival in Tokyo – Best Supporting Actor
