= Audition (1999 film) =

1999 film by Takashi Miike

- Theatrical release poster
- Directed by: Takashi Miike
- Screenplay by: Daisuke Tengan
- Based on: Audition by Ryu Murakami
- Produced by: Satoshi Fukushima; Akemi Suyama
- Starring: Ryo Ishibashi; Eihi Shiina; Jun Kunimura; Miyuki Matsuda; Toshie Negishi; Tetsu Sawaki; Shigeru Saiki; Ken Mitsuishi; Ren Osugi; Renji Ishibashi
- Cinematography: Hideo Yamamoto
- Edited by: Yasushi Shimamura
- Music by: Kōji Endō
- Production companies: Omega Project; Creators Company Connection; Film Face; AFDF Korea; Bodysonic
- Release dates: October 2, 1999 (VIFF); March 3, 2000 (Japan)
- Running time: 113 minutes
- Country: Japan
- Language: Japanese
- Box office: $131,296 (U.S.)

Audition (Japanese: オーディション, Hepburn: Ōdishon) is a 1999 Japanese horror film directed by Takashi Miike and written by Daisuke Tengan, who adapted it from Ryu Murakami's 1997 novel of the same name. It follows a middle-aged widower (Ryo Ishibashi) who enlists the help of his film producer friend (Jun Kunimura) to stage fake auditions in order to meet a new girlfriend, only to find that the young woman he chooses (Eihi Shiina) has a dark past.

The film was originally a project of the Japanese company Omega Project, who wanted to make another horror film after the financial success of Ring (1998). The company purchased the rights to Murakami's book and sought Miike and Tengan for an adaptation. The cast and crew consisted primarily of previous Miike collaborators, with the exception of Shiina, who had worked as a model prior to making her acting debut in Audition. The film was shot in Tokyo over a three-week period.

Audition premiered with a few other Japanese horror films at the Vancouver International Film Festival, but received increased attention when screened at the 2000 Rotterdam International Film Festival, where it received the FIPRESCI Prize and the KNF Award. Following a theatrical release in Japan, the film continued to play at festivals and had theatrical releases in the United States and United Kingdom, followed by several home media releases. It grossed $131,296 at the U.S. box office.

The film was received positively by Western film critics, with many singling out the intense climactic scene and commenting on its stark contrast to the scenes that preceded it. The film has appeared on several lists of the best horror films ever made and has had an influence on other horror directors, including Eli Roth and the Soska sisters.

== Plot ==
Shigeharu Aoyama's wife Ryoko dies from an undisclosed illness. Seven years later, Shigeharu's teenage son Shigehiko encourages him to remarry. Shigeharu's friend, film producer Yasuhisa Yoshikawa, organizes a fake casting call, at which young women ostensibly audition for the starring role in a new television series. Posing as a casting director so he can meet the aspiring actress, Shigeharu is immediately enchanted by an applicant named Asami Yamazaki, a former ballerina who claims her dancing career ended due to injuries.

Yasuhisa is suspicious when he cannot reach any of the references in Asami's résumé, including a music producer who went missing 18 months earlier, but Shigeharu continues to pursue her regardless. In her very small apartment, which contains little more than a large sack and a telephone, Asami sits perfectly still next to the phone for four days after the audition. When it finally rings, she answers, pretending she never expected Shigeharu to call. After several dates, she accompanies Shigeharu to a love hotel, where he intends to propose marriage. She reveals burn scars across her body and, before having sex, demands that he pledge his love to her. Deeply moved, he complies. The following morning, Shigeharu receives a call from the front desk to inform him that Asami has left.

Shigeharu tries to find Asami, but all of the contacts on her résumé are dead ends, as Yasuhisa warned. At the dance studio where Asami trained, Shigeharu finds her former instructor, who tortured Asami by burning her legs when she was a child and now has prosthetic feet. Shigeharu then goes to the bar where Asami claims to have worked, where he learns from a local man that the bar has been closed for a year following the murder and dismemberment of the owner, and that the police found an extra tongue, an extra ear, and three extra fingers upon recovering the body.

Asami sneaks into Shigeharu's house while he is at work and becomes jealous upon seeing a framed picture of Ryoko. She drugs his liquor and kills Gangu, the family dog. Shigeharu returns, drinks the liquor, collapses, and experiences flashbacks to previous dates with Asami and sexual experiences with other women from his past. In Asami's apartment, a man who is missing both feet, his tongue, an ear, and three fingers crawls out of the sack and begs for food. Asami vomits into a dog bowl, which the man hungrily consumes. Asami then uses a garrote wire to decapitate her dance instructor.

Shigeharu passes out. Once he awakens, Asami informs him that she has injected him with a paralytic agent that disables his muscles but leaves him conscious and able to feel. As she begins to insert acupuncture needles into him, she explains that he has failed to love only her. She cuts off his left foot with a wire saw, and begins to do the same to his right foot until Shigehiko returns home from school; Asami attacks him. Shigeharu suddenly reawakens in the hotel, where he proposes marriage to Asami, who accepts. He falls back asleep and returns to reality to find Shigehiko fighting Asami. Shigehiko overpowers Asami and kicks her down the stairs, breaking her neck. Shigeharu instructs Shigehiko to call the police and stares across the room at the dying Asami, who repeats something she said on one of their dates about being excited to see him again.

== Cast ==
- Ryo Ishibashi as Shigeharu Aoyama (青山 重治, Aoyama Shigeharu)
- Eihi Shiina as Asami Yamazaki (山崎 麻美, Yamazaki Asami)
- Jun Kunimura as Yasuhisa Yoshikawa (吉川泰久, Yoshikawa Yasuhisa), a film producer and Shigeharu's friend
- Tetsu Sawaki as Shigehiko Aoyama (青山 重彦, Aoyama Shigehiko), Shigeharu's teenage son
- Miyuki Matsuda as Ryoko Aoyama (青山良子, Aoyama Ryoko), Shigeharu's late wife
- Toshie Negishi as Rie (リエ)
- Shigeru Saiki as bar owner (酒場のマスター, Sakaba no masutā)
- Ken Mitsuishi as director (ディレクター, Direkutā)
- Ren Osugi as Shimada (芝田)
- Renji Ishibashi as old man in wheelchair (車椅子の老人, Kurumaisu no rōjin)

== Themes ==
Critics have considered Audition as both feminist and misogynistic. Miike has stated that when he met journalists in the United Kingdom and France, he found they commented on the film's feminist themes when Asami gets revenge on the men in her life. The film sets up Aoyama with traits and behaviors which could be considered sexist: a list of criteria for his bride to meet, and the phony audition format he uses to search for a future wife. Tom Mes, author of Agitator: The Cinema of Takashi Miike, stated that the torture sequence, with the mutilation of Aoyama, can be seen as revenge from Asami. Dennis Lim of the Los Angeles Times examined similar themes, noting that the film is "ultimately about the male fear of women and female sexuality" and that women are blatantly objectified in the first half of the film, only to have Asami "redress this imbalance" in the second half when she becomes an "avenging angel".

Chris Pizzello, writing in the American Cinematographer, stated that one plausible approach to interpreting the film is to see the final act as a representation of Aoyama's guilt at his mistreatment of women and his desire to dominate them. Aoyama develops a paranoid fantasy of an attacking object: because he harbours sadistic thoughts towards women, he develops a fear that the object will retaliate. Contrary to this, Miike has stated that the final torture scenes in the film are not a paranoid nightmare dreamed up by Aoyama. Tom Mes has argued against the feminist portrayal of the film, noting that Asami is not motivated by an ideological agenda, and that acknowledging that she takes revenge on a man who has lied to her would be ignoring that she has also lied to Aoyama. Asami states "I want to tell you everything" during the torture scene, implying she had not been truthful before. Mes also notes that the avenging angel theme contradicts a feminist-themed revenge interpretation, given that one of Asami's victims is female.

In Audition, the character of Asami is a victim of child abuse. Colette Balmain, in her book Introduction to Japanese Horror Film, described Asami as "just one more face of the wronged women in Japanese culture... They are victims of repression and oppression, and only death and loneliness remain for them". The film critic Robin Wood wrote that through her child abuse, Asami is taught that love and pain must be inseparable. The audience is led to identify with Asami through this victimization and also what Stephen LeDrew described as a "patriarchal Japanese society".

Elvis Mitchell (The New York Times) stated that the theme of the film was: "the objectification of women in Japanese society and the mirror-image horror of retribution it could create". Tom Mes suggested that these themes can be witnessed in the scene where Asami feeds her mutilated prisoner and then turns into the childhood version of herself and pets him like a dog. Mes concludes that this is done to suggest that what had happened in Asami's life had made her the violent adult seen in the film.

== Production ==
=== Development ===
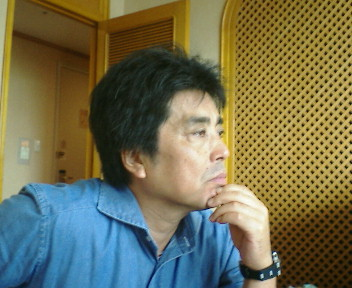
The film was adapted from the novel of the same name by Ryu Murakami.

The main production company behind Audition was the Japanese company Omega Project. Omega were originally behind the production of Hideo Nakata's film Ring; this was a great success in Japan and, subsequently, the rest of Asia. Omega had problems setting up the release of Ring in Korea and had the company AFDF Korea work on a Korean re-adaptation of Ring. The following year, in 1998, Omega partnered again with AFDF Korea and other production companies, including Creators Company Connection, Film Face, and Bodysonic to make the adaptation of Ryū Murakami's 1997 novel Audition. Omega wanted to create a film different from the supernatural-themed Ring, and chose to adapt Murakami's novel, which lacked this trait. To attempt something different, they hired a screenwriter (Daisuke Tengan) and a director (Takashi Miike) who were not known for working on horror films. Prior to Audition, Tengan was best known as a screenwriter for working with his father (Shohei Imamura) on The Eel, which won the Palme d'Or in 1997.

=== Pre-production ===
To create Audition, Miike worked with many of his previous collaborators, such as cinematographer Hideo Yamamoto. Miike spoke of his cinematographer by saying that Yamamoto was: "very sensitive towards death. Both of his parents died very young, and it's not something he talks about much". Miike also noted that he felt that Yamamoto was: "living in fear, and that sensibility comes through in his work. It's something I want to make the most of". The film's score was composed by Kōji Endō. Endō had previously composed work for Miike on films such as The Bird People in China. Yasushi Shimamura was the film's editor. Shimamura had worked with Miike as early as Lady Hunter: Prelude To Murder in 1991.

Actor Ryo Ishibashi wanted to work with Miike and agreed to the role. He commented that despite not being a great fan of horror films, he enjoyed scripts such as that of Audition, that showcased human nature. Model Eihi Shiina was cast in the film as Asami. Shiina's career was primarily as a model and she only began acting after being offered a film role while she was on holidays.

Shiina first learned about Miike through his film Blues Harp, which made her interested in meeting the director. When Shiina first met Miike, they began talking about her opinions on love and relationships. On their second meeting, Miike asked Shiina to play the part of Asami. Shiina thought that the opinions and feelings she expressed to Miike were the reason she was cast in the role, and she tried to play the role as naturally as she could without going over the top.

=== Production ===
Audition was shot in approximately three weeks, which was about one more week than usual for Miike's films at the time. Scenes such as those in Asami's apartment and at a restaurant were shot on location in a real apartment and a real restaurant. Outdoor scenes were shot in Tokyo, along intersections in Omotesandō.

The torture scene at the end of the film did not initially contain Asami's lines "Kiri-kiri-kiri". Shiina was initially whispering her lines while filming this scene, but after discussion with Miike, the two decided that having her say these lines would make the scene scarier. Ishibashi found that Miike was "having so much fun with that scene", and that Miike was especially excited when Ishibashi's character's feet are cut off. For the special effects where Shiina's character places acupuncture needles into Ishibashi, special effects make-up was used to create a mask layer which was laid upon Ishibashi's eyes, which is then pierced by the needles.

== Release ==
=== Theatrical ===
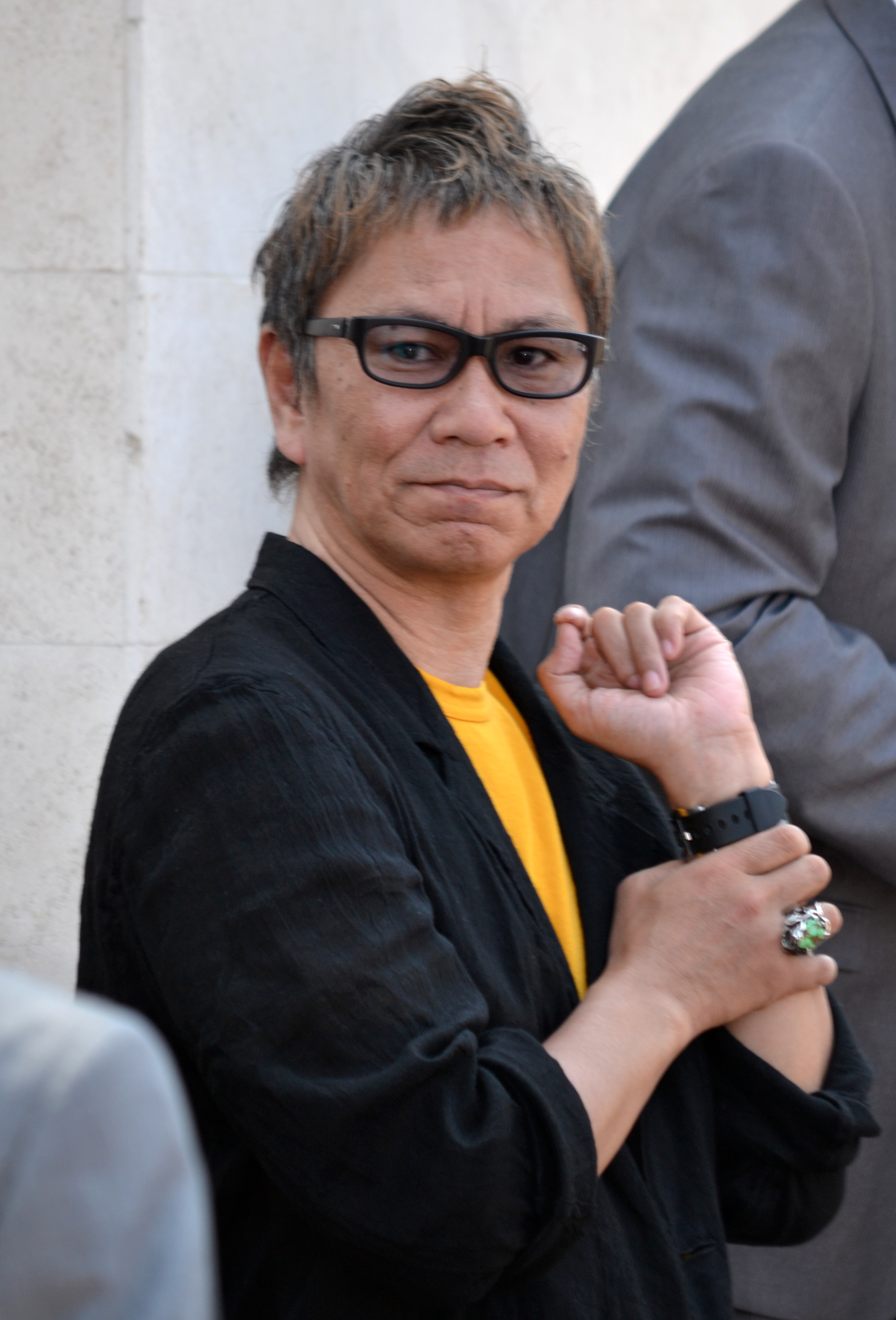
Director Takashi Miike won two awards for Audition at the Rotterdam International Film Festival.

Audition had its world premiere on October 2, 1999, at the Vancouver International Film Festival. The premiere was part of a program of modern Japanese horror films at the festival, including Ring, Ring 2, Shikoku, and Gemini. Audition was screened at the 29th Rotterdam International Film Festival in The Netherlands in early 2000 where it was shown as part of a Miike retrospective. Tom Mes stated that Audition received the most attention at Rotterdam, where it won the FIPRESCI Prize for the best film of competition. The FIPRESCI award was given by a jury of international film journalists, who grant this award during the Rotterdam International Film Festival. Only films not in competition qualify for the award. Audition also won the KNF Award, voted by the Circle of Dutch Film journalists.

Audition was released theatrically in Japan on March 3, 2000. When asked about the reception in Japan, Miike stated that there was "no reaction" as the film was shown in small theaters for a short theatrical run.

Miike followed up that the Japanese audience did not really know about Audition until it received a greater reputation abroad. It received its American premiere at the Seattle International Film Festival in 2000. The film was given its theatrical release in the United States on August 8, 2001. It eventually grossed $131,296 in the country.

In the United Kingdom, Audition received screenings in 2000 at both FrightFest and the Raindance Film Festival. It was released theatrically in the United Kingdom by Metro Tartan in mid-March 2001. It was Miike's first film to be released theatrically in the United Kingdom.

=== Home media ===
Audition was released on DVD in the United States by Chimera on June 4, 2002. The DVD included an interview with Miike and a documentary on the Egyptian Theater in Los Angeles. A new DVD was released by Lionsgate in 2005 dubbed the "uncut special edition". This release included an interview with Ryu Murakami, a selected scene commentary by Miike, and a clip from Bravo's The 100 Scariest Movie Moments. Peter Schorn of IGN gave a negative review of the 2006 DVD, finding that the video was "overcompressed to the point that a distracting, shifting blockiness frequently in backgrounds that draws the eye away from the actors". IGN concluded that the: "overall image quality is soft and fuzzy, with weak black levels, murky shadow areas and less-than-impressive color saturation". On October 6, 2009, Shout! Factory released a DVD and Blu-ray release of the film that featured an introduction by Miike and actress Eihi Shiina, a full audio commentary by Miike and screenwriter Daisuke Tengan, and a documentary featuring the cast.

Audition was released in the United Kingdom on DVD by Tartan Video on June 28, 2004. The disc contained an interview with Miike and liner notes by Joe Cornish. Matthew Leyland (Sight & Sound) reviewed this release, stating that the audio and visual presentation was "exemplary" while noting that the interview with Miike was the only noteworthy bonus feature on the disc. The film was later released by Arrow Video on February 29, 2016. The Arrow Video release was exclusively restored in 2K resolution and was scanned from a 35 mm interpositive. A 4K UHD version, again from Arrow Video, is due for release on 15th June 2026.

== Reception ==
On Rotten Tomatoes, the film has a rating of 83% based on 81 reviews, with an average rating of 7.4/10. The website's critical consensus reads, "An audacious, unsettling Japanese horror film from director Takashi Miike, Audition entertains as both a grisly shocker and a psychological drama". On Metacritic, the film has a weighted average score of 70 out of 100, based on 19 critics, indicating "generally favorable reviews".

Ken Eisner (Variety) gave the film a positive review. Eisner referred to the film as a "truly shocking horror film" that was "made even more disturbing by its haunting beauty". Geoffrey Macnab, writing in Sight and Sound, referred to the film as a "slow-burning but ultimately devastating horror pic" and wrote that "it's a virtuoso piece of film-making with much more subtlety and depth than Miike's other films". The Hollywood Reporter's Frank Scheck described the film as "one of the most audacious, iconoclastic horror films in recent years". Mark Schilling (The Japan Times) praised Shiina and Ishibashi's acting, but noted that "among the film's few irritants is a smarmy, snarly bad guy turn by Renji Ishibashi as Asami's wheelchair-using ballet instructor. He is a reminder of where too many other Miike films have headed – straight for the video racks". Schilling concluded that "Miike is ready for a bigger role – as one of the leading Japanese directors of his generation". In the early 2010s, Time Out conducted a poll with several authors, directors, actors and critics who have worked within the horror genre to vote for their top horror films. Audition placed at number 18 on their top 100 list.

=== Final sequence response ===
Writers for Variety, The Hollywood Reporter and Sight & Sound all emphasized the film's final scene. Scheck (The Hollywood Reporter) wrote that "Miike lulls the audience into a state of complacency with a studied, slow-moving, lightly comic first half before delivering a gruesome final section that makes Stephen King's Misery look wholesome"; the ending was "all the more shocking for the clinical way in which it is presented". Eisner (Variety) stated that it is only at the ending of the film that Audition "breaks out of creepfest ghetto". In his essay on themes in Audition, Robin Wood stated that most of Miike's films are disturbing for "what they have to tell us about the state of contemporary civilization; they are not in the least disturbing in themselves, operating on some fantasy level of annihilation, with 'comic-book' violence". In comparison, he stated that Audition is "authentically disturbing, and infinitely more horrifying: the first time I watched it – on DVD, at home, after warnings I had received – I was repeatedly tempted, through the last half hour, to turn it off". Wood compared the film to Pier Paolo Pasolini's Salò, or the 120 Days of Sodom, stating that the film was "almost as unwatchable as the news reels – of Auschwitz, of the innocent victims of Hiroshima and Nagasaki and Vietnam, victims of Nazi or American dehumanization".

Of the film's success with Western audiences, Miike states that he was not surprised, but that he had "no idea what goes on in the minds of people in the West and I don't pretend to know what their tastes are. And I don't want to start thinking about that. It's nice that they liked my movie, but I'm not going to start deliberately worrying about why or what I can do to make it happen again". Actress Eihi Shiina stated that, in Japan, only a certain type of film fan would watch Audition. By comparison, she said, the film was seen by many more people overseas, which she attributed to "good timing".

== Aftermath and influence ==
"I'm just curious how it'd look like if someone tried to remake my work. But I really believe that it's hard to remake of [sic] any of my work."

— Miike on being asked about his films being remade in Hollywood

After the release of Audition, Miike was going to adapt Murakami's novel Coin Locker Babies, but the project failed to find enough financing.

Audition has been described as an influence on "torture porn". The term was invented by David Edelstein to describe films such as Saw, The Devil's Rejects and Wolf Creek offering "titillating and shocking" scenes which push the audience to the margins of depravity in order for them to "feel something". Audition influenced American directors such as Eli Roth. Roth stated that Audition influenced him to make his film Hostel, with Miike even making a cameo as a satisfied customer of the kidnappers who let customers torture their victims. Richard Corliss, writing in Time, opined that Audition was different from torture porn films as: "unlike Saw and its imitators in the genre of torture porn, Audition doesn't go for gore-ific money shots. Miike's films live inside their characters, taking the temperature of their longings, the ridiculous ambitions they chase so obsessively and their need to experience the extreme to prove they're alive".

Audition has been referenced in western popular culture such as comics, music videos, and other media. It was listed by twin directors Jen and Sylvia Soska as one of their favourite horror films, and with the sisters saying that it was an influence on their film American Mary. The directors noted the character of Asami, stating that an audience generally sees: "female characters in a horror film as the helpless victim. This film leads you in one direction, skillfully hinting at a darker storyline for the otherwise meek and slight Asami until the final 15 minutes where we are introduced to a merciless monster. A perfect personification of the irrational rage of a woman scorned". Director Quentin Tarantino included Audition in his list of top 20 films released since 1992 (the year he became a director), referring to it as a "true masterpiece if there ever was one".

Audition was among the films included in the book 1001 Movies You Must See Before You Die (2015).

Deadline reported that executive producer Mario Kassar had begun work on an English-language adaptation of Audition in 2014. Richard Gray was brought on to serve as the remake's director and screenwriter. The film's storyline would be taken from Ryu Murakami's novel as opposed to an adaptation of Miike's film, and the film would take place in North America. The new film would include scenes and locations in the novel that were not in Miike's film. Kassar spoke about the remake in 2016, saying he was "almost there. It's taking me a long time because it is kind of hard to do this movie but I'm not going to do it unless I know I'm doing it right." Focus Features and Hyde Park Entertainment announced development on an adaptation of the novel in 2025. The film is set to be directed and written by Christian Tafdrup and co-written by Christian's brother Mads Tafdrup.

== See also ==
- List of cult films
- List of horror films of 1999
- List of Japanese films of 1999

== Sources ==
- Andrews, Mark (September 23, 1999). "Looking to the Future: The Vancouver International Film Festival Doesn't Want its Audience to Go Grey, But It's Tough to Sell Art Films to the Young". The Vancouver Sun. Infomart. ISSN 0832-1299.
- Arnold, William (October 25, 2001). "'Audition' Has a Very Dark Side". Seattle Post-Intelligencer. Archived from the original on March 4, 2016.
- Aston, James; Walliss, John (2013). To See the Saw Movies: Essays on Torture Porn and Post-9/11 Horror. McFarland. ISBN 978-0-7864-7089-1.
- Balmain, Colette (2008). Introduction to Japanese Horror Film. Edinburgh University Press. ISBN 978-0-7486-2475-1.
- Bitel, Anton (2016). Guilty of Romance: Love, Loneliness and Loss in Takashi Miike's Audition (booklet). Arrow Films. p. 8. FCD1208/1209.
- Brown, Lane (August 17, 2009). "Team America, Anything Else Among the Best Movies of the Past Seventeen Years, Claims Quentin Tarantino". Vulture. New York Media LLC. Archived from the original on February 13, 2013.
- Child, Ben (June 30, 2014). "Hollywood to Remake Audition: English-language Version of Cult Japanese Horror Planned". The Guardian.
- Cirone, David (July 15, 2021). "Takashi Miike's Audition Homaged in Popular Image Comic Stray Dogs". J-Generation.
- Corliss, Richard (October 26, 2007). "Top 25 Horror Movies". Time. Archived from the original on May 10, 2016.
- Crow, Jonathan. "Audition (1999)". AllMovie. Archived from the original on May 10, 2012.
- D'Alessandro, Anthony (January 30, 2025). "Focus Features & Hyde Park Team For Adaptation Of 'Audition', Christian Tafdrup Directing & Writing". Deadline Hollywood.
- Desjardins, Chris (2005). Outlaw Masters of Japanese Film. I. B. Tauris. ISBN 978-1-84511-090-1.
- Eisner, Ken (October 31, 1999). "Review: 'Audition'". Variety. Archived from the original on March 6, 2016.
- Gartside, Will (2013). "The Hostel Rhetoric of Torture: A Discourse Analysis of Torture Porn". Projections. 7 (1). Berghahn Books and Journals. doi:10.3167/proj.2013.070107. ISSN 1934-9688.
- Gingold, Michael (September 17, 2014). "Exclusive: Director Richard Gray Talks the "Audition" Remake". Fangoria. Archived from the original on January 2, 2015.
- Hanley, Ken W. (March 11, 2014). "Stream to Scream: Takashi Miike's "Audition"". Fangoria. Archived from the original on March 9, 2016.
- Hantke, Steffen (2005). "Japanese Horror Under Western Eyes: Social Class and Global culture in Miike Takashi's Audition". In McRoy, Jay (ed.). Japanese Horror Cinema. Edinburgh University Press. ISBN 978-0-7486-1995-5.
- Hantke, Steffen (2010). American Horror Film: The Genre at the Turn of the Millennium. University Press of Mississippi. ISBN 978-1-60473-454-6.
- Ishibashi, Ryo. Ryo Ishibashi: Tokyo – Hollywood (Blu ray (Disc 1)). Arrow Films. FCD1208/1209.
- Jaafar, Ali (May 12, 2016). "Deadline Disruptors: King Of Cannes Mario Kassar On The Glory Days Of Carolco, Why Buying Arnie A Plane Made Sense & Talking Vaginas". Deadline.
- LeDrew, Stephen (January 2006). "Jokes and Their Relation to the Uncanny: The Comic, the Horrific, and Pleasure in Audition and Romero's Dead films". PSYART. University of Florida.
- Leyland, Matthew (October 2004). "Audition". Sight & Sound. Vol. 14, no. 10. British Film Institute. p. 74.
- Lim, Dennis (October 4, 2009). "'Audition': A Nightmare With No Escape". Los Angeles Times. Archived from the original on November 11, 2012.
- Macnab, Geoffrey (December 2001). "Audition". Sight & Sound. Vol. 11, no. 12. British Film Institute. p. 63. ISSN 0037-4806.
- McCutcheon, David (August 12, 2009). "Audition Again". IGN. Archived from the original on June 4, 2016.
- Mes, Tom. Commentary by Tom Mes (Blu ray (Disc 1)). Arrow Films. FCD1208/1209.
- Mes, Tom (2006). Agitator: The Cinema of Takashi Miike. FAB Press. ISBN 978-1-903254-41-7.
- Mes, Tom (August 2005). "Prelude to Pain". Rue Morgue. No. 48.
- Miike, Takashi; Tengan, Daisuke. Commentary by Takashi Miike and Daisuke Tengan (Blu ray (Disc 1)). Arrow Films. FCD1208/1209.
- Mitchell, Elvis (August 8, 2001). "Film Review; Wife Hunting Sure is a Sick and Frightful Business". The New York Times. Archived from the original on November 5, 2014.
- Otto, Jeff (22 July 2004). "Interview: Takashi Miike Page 2 of 2". IGN. Archived from the original on February 22, 2017.
- Phipps, Keith (October 24, 2007). "24 Hours Of Horror With Eli Roth". The A.V. Club. Archived from the original on March 25, 2016.
- Pizzello, Chris (September 2002). "DVD Playback: "Audition"". American Cinematographer. Vol. 83, no. 9. ISSN 0002-7928.
- Salem, Merryana (May 18, 2021). "Olivia Rodrigo's New Music Video is Packed Full of References to the Meanest Girls in Cinema". Junkee.
- Scheck, Frank (August 21, 2001). "'Audition' Casts Scary Net". The Hollywood Reporter. Vol. 369, no. 34. p. 143.
- Schilling, Mark (March 14, 2000). "Mid-life Crisis Meets Lethal Psychosis". The Japan Times. Archived from the original on January 13, 2009.
- Schneider, Steven Jay, ed. (2015). 1001 Movies You Must See Before You Die. Quintessence Editions (9th ed.). Hauppauge, New York: Barron's Educational Series. p. 878. ISBN 978-0-7641-6790-4. OCLC 796279948.
- Schorn, Peter (March 17, 2006). "Audition (Uncut Special Edition)". IGN.
- Shiina, Eihi. Eihi Shiina: From Audition to Vampire Girl (Blu ray (Disc 1)). Arrow Films. FCD1208/1209.
- Wood, Robin (2004). ""Revenge is Sweet": The Bitterness of Audition". Film International. No. 7. Intellect Ltd. ISSN 1651-6826.
- Yamato, Jen (28 June 2014). "'Terminator,' 'Basic Instinct' Producer Piecing Together 'Audition' Remake". Deadline Hollywood.
- "AICN Horror chats with Jen & Sylvia Soska, the writers/directors of American Mary!". Aint It Cool News. May 30, 2013.
- "Koji Endo". AllMovie. Archived from the original on June 4, 2016.
- "Audition (1999) – Takashi Miike – Releases". AllMovie [i]. Archived from the original on May 10, 2012.
- About the Restoration (booklet). Arrow Films. 2016. p. 14. FCD1208/1209.
- "Audition (2001)". Box Office Mojo. Internet Movie Database.
- "Audition (2000)". British Board of Film Classification. Archived from the original on April 7, 2016.
- "Unagi". Festival de Cannes. Cannes Film Festival. Archived from the original on March 12, 2016.
- "2000". FIPRESCI. Archived from the original on March 5, 2016.
- "FIPRESCI Award". International Film Festival Rotterdam. Archived from the original on March 5, 2016.
- "KNF Award". International Film Festival Rotterdam [i]. Archived from the original on March 5, 2016.
- "The 100 Best Horror Films – S". Time Out London.
- "The 18th Vancouver International Film Festival". Vancouver International Film Festival. Archived from the original on January 18, 2000.
- "Vitagraph Films". Vitagraph Films. Archived from the original on November 21, 2008.
