= Man, Next Natural Girl: 100 Nights in Yokohama =

1999 Japanese miniseries

- Directed by: Takashi Miike
- Written by: Itaru Era (screenplay); Yuuji Ishida (story); Tetsuya Koshiba (manga)
- Cinematography: Hideo Yamamoto
- Music by: Kōji Endō
- Release date: 1999
- Running time: 160 minutes/202 minutes
- Country: Japan

Man, Next Natural Girl: 100 Nights in Yokohama (天然少女萬NEXT 横浜百夜篇, Tennen shōjo Man next: Yokohama hyaku-ya hen; also known as N-Girls Vs Vampire and Man, Next Natural Girl: Perfect Box) is a 1999 two-part Japanese television series directed by Takashi Miike.

== Cast ==
- Ayana Sakai as Man Kôda
- Takashi Nagayama as Yuuya Narui
- Chiaki Ichiba as Riona Mishima
- Erika Yamakawa as Chiaki Amamiya
- Eri Nomura as Maki Nishida
- Chikako Ôba as Yukari Eda
- Shiori as Maria Kanzaki
- Aya Makinoda as Azumi Takizawa
- Sayaka Kamiya as Sena
- Hitomi Oota as Ayumi
- Yuuki Fukuzono as Kenjirô
- Tomonori Masuda as Satoshi
- Kazuhiro Sakai as Taichi
- Sara Matsuzaka as Minako
- Megumi Yasu as Eimi
- Yuuko Arai as Kasumi
- Chika Kaidu as Rei
- Kenta Kiritani as Hideki
- Kaz as Sakakibara
- Shingo Tsurumi as Bearded missionary/"God"
- Tenmei Kano as Eda Isao
- Tomoshi Uno as Akira
- Michisuke Kashiwaya as Haruki
- Hassei Takano
- Kazumi Kamiizumi
- Takehiko Tsuno
- Shuuto Tsuji
- Takahiro Araki
- Shirô Sakamoto as Club DJ
- Daisuke Nakagawa (actor)
- Takaomi Maeda
- Takashi Iwaki
- Yuuki Nishio
- Yuuki Sakamoto
- Kazumi Nakazawa as Saint agency model
- Tsubasa Otomiya as Saint agency model
- Yukiko Haji as Saint agency model
- Misuzu Sekine as Saint agency model
- Mayo Suganô as Saint agency model
- Hiromi Watanabe as Taichi's mother
- Tenha Yokomori as Baby Taichi
- Hirofumi Fukuzawa

== Other credits ==
- Produced by
  - Yuuji Ishida - planner, producer
  - Yasuhiro Kitsuda - producer
  - Nobuaki Murooka - producer
  - Wataru Tanaka - producer
- Original music by
  - Kōji Endō
  - Concerto Moon - theme song "When the Moon Cries"
- Makeup department
  - Masarô Fukuda - special makeup effects artist
  - Yuuichi Matsui - special makeup effects supervisor
  - Fumihiro Miyoshi - special makeup effects artist
  - Miyuki Yamaguchi - special makeup effects artist
- Special Effects by: Makoto Funabashi
- Visual effects by
  - Masayoshi Obata - CGI director
  - Misako Saka - CGI producer
