= Agitator (film) =

2001 film by Takashi Miike

- Theatrical release poster
- Directed by: Takashi Miike
- Screenplay by: Shigenori Takechi
- Story by: Shigenori Takechi
- Starring: Masaya Kato; Naoto Takenaka; Ryōsuke Miki; Masatō Ibu; Hiroki Matsukata
- Cinematography: Kiyoshi Itō
- Edited by: Yasushi Shimamura
- Music by: Kōji Endō
- Release date: 2001
- Running time: 150 minutes (theatrical); 200 minutes (extended)
- Country: Japan
- Language: Japanese

Agitator (荒ぶる魂たち, Araburu tamashii-tachi; also known as The Outlaw Souls) is a 2001 yakuza film directed by Takashi Miike.

== Plot ==
Mr. Kaito, head of the Kaito Group of over 2,000 soldiers under the umbrella of the Tenseikai Syndicate, seeks to absorb the 500 soldiers of the Shirane Group as well as the 400 soldiers of that group's rival, the Yokomizo Family, and become the largest group in the syndicate in order to ensure that he will be chosen as the successor to the hospitalized leader of the syndicate. Kaito enlists the aid of Mizushima and Muroi of the Shirane Group, promising that Mizushima will thereby take over as leader of the Shirane Group. Muroi hires Shinozake, who assaults hostesses on Yokomizo turf and is then killed by the Higuchi Gang. Higuchi is reprimanded by the Yokomizo Family but Mizushima and Muroi hire an outside assassin named Numata to kill the leader of the family, Yokomizo Takanori, and claim that the assassin was an overzealous Shirane soldier seeking revenge.

Mr. Kaito mediates on behalf of the Tenseikai but Tsuchiya of the Yokomizo does not accept the initial offer. Mizushima and Muroi offer to bring their leader Shirane Kozo to a place at a specific time where Yokomizo soldiers will be able to kill him so that Mizushima can take over the Shirane Group, after which Mizushima and Tsuchiya will swear brotherhood under Kaito, who will then be able take over the Tenseikai Syndicate. Kunihiko Kenzaki of the Higuchi Gang is sent to kill Shirane Kozo and completes his mission without interference, leading him to suspect that the hit was set up from the inside. The Higuchi Gang cuts ties with the Yokomizo Family just before Mizushima and Tsuchiya swear brotherhood under Kaito.

Kunihiko and the members of his Kenzaki Squad kidnap Muroi and beat him until he confesses the entire plan on tape. They blackmail Tsuchiya with this information, threatening to release it if their boss Yoichi Higuchi is not made head of the Yokomizo Family, but Yoichi is not interested and has already resigned himself to the fact that the Yokomizo and Shirane are now part of the same organization. Instead, they trade Muroi back to the Shirane in exchange for 50 million yen, but afterwards Yoichi is shot dead by Numata.

Mr. Torii is named the new head of the Higuchi Gang and tells Kunihiko that they are accepting Tsuchiya's invitation back into the Yokomizo Family. Kunihiko disbands the Kenzaki Squad and gives his men 20 million yen to divide between themselves, then kills Mizushima at a barber shop. Muroi's taped confession is heard by the members of the Executive Committee of the Yokomizo Family, who expel Mr. Hirata for his involvement. The Higuchi Gang is also suspended from the Yokomizo Family until further notice.

Numata kidnaps Kunihiko's soldier Sakuraba, explaining the Kunihiko killed his son years ago. Kunihiko comes to save Sakuraba and he and Numata run through the woods shooting at each other. Kunihiko's loyal soldiers Otomo, Yoshio, and Hitoshi rush to his aid. Numata kills Yoshio while Hitoshi whimpers helplessly, then Kunihiko and Otomo face off against Numata, who has a gun pointed at Sakuraba but says that he only wants Kunihiko. Kunihiko throws down his weapon in exchange for Sakuraba but Numata kills Sakuraba anyway. He then shoots at Kunihiko but Otomo jumps in front of him and is shot dead instead. Kunihiko then shoots Numata dead. In the final scene, Kunihiko and Hitoshi, the only survivors, drive through the gates of the yakuza headquarters with a lit stick of dynamite.

== Cast ==
- Masaya Kato as Kunihiko Kenzaki
- Naoto Takenaka as Yoichi Higuchi
- Hiroki Matsukata as Mr. Kaitō
- Ryōsuke Miki
- Masatō Ibu as Mizushima
- Taisaku Akino
- Mickey Curtis as Yokomizo
- Renji Ishibashi
- Kenichi Endō as Muroi
- Yoshiyuki Daichi as Sakuraba
- Aya Kawamura
- Takashi Miike as Shinozaki
- Kōji Tsukamoto
- Hakuryu
- Hitoshi Ozawa

== Reception ==
Reviewer AO of Empire magazine gave it 2 out of 5 stars, writing, "Though there are flashes of dark wit, punchy action, some well-judged flourishes and a sense of brooding fatalism, it all amounts to very little given the lack of story focus or sympathetic characters, with the one slightly touching (male) relationship truncated midway."

Reviewer Ross of the website hkcinema.co.uk called it "a solid genre piece offering a good deal of cunning manipulation alongside the gangland murders and will please both fans of yakuza pictures and Miike completists."

Rouven Linnarz of Asian Movie Pulse wrote, "While its dimensions, the number of characters and sub-plots, take away some of the tension and drama, you have to respect the vision behind the film, even though it may not be something you have not seen before."
