= Shinjuku Outlaw =

- DVD cover bearing the title Shinjuku Outlaws
- Directed by: Takashi Miike
- Written by: Fumio Tanaka (novel)
- Screenplay by: Ichirô Fujita; Yoshiki Nagasawa
- Cinematography: Masakazu Oka; Kazunari Tanaka
- Release date: October 21, 1994 (home video)
- Running time: 94 minutes
- Country: Japan
- Language: Japanese

Shinjuku Outlaw (新宿アウトロー, Shinjuku autoroo), also known as Shinjuku Outlaws, is a 1994 Japanese video (V-cinema) directed by Takashi Miike.

== Plot ==
Near the end of the Shōwa era, Mr. Tagami of the criminal investigation department takes the guards off of the yakuza boss Muraoka for one day, enabling Yomi Katsuichi to shoot him dead in a bowling alley. Muraoka's men return fire, leaving Yomi in a vegetative state in the hospital.

10 years later, Yomi awakens from his coma in Miyagi Prison and is released on parole. In Shinjuku, Tokyo, Mr. Tagami still accepts weekly bribes from Okumura in exchange for information. Eto has run off with Yomi's sister Ayumi and begun a prostitution ring in Shinjuku, Tokyo. Katayama of the Toryukai Group beats Eto for embezzling money from the girls.

Yomi rescues a gay man being attacked by members of the Taiwan Mafia. No longer bound to yakuza rules, he retrieves Eto from the Toryukai but instead of cutting off Eto's finger he fights his way out, making himself and Eto a target for the Toryukai and their allies, the Okumura Group. Asami, head of the Toryukai Group, and Okumura, head of the Aiyuu Federation, force Yomi to become one of their soldiers by threatening to kill Eto and Ayumi. A woman begins visiting Yomi, telling him that she is one of Okumura's whores.

Tagami catches Eto picking up a bag of drugs for distribution and learns that his supplier is Yoshizawa, a former member of Okumura's gang now working under the Taiwanese gangster Fang Yuan Shung.

Yomi and Tsuji, a Peruvian who was caught smuggling cocaine and then taken under Okumura's wing, go to Misaki Fishing Harbor to pick up a shipment of arms concealed within fish but the Taiwan Mafia arrives and attempts to take it. Tsuji and Yomi shoot the attackers, but Yoshizawa escapes. Fang summons Yomi and asks him to kill Okumura but Yomi is not interested.

Tagami pressures Eto to steal the drugs from an upcoming deal between Chang from the consulate and one of Fang's men and to give half of it to Okumura to cancel his debt. After the deal is made, Eto beats Fang's henchman and takes the drugs. Rather than giving it to Okumura, he gives it to the whore staying at Yomi's house and begins packing his things to flee with Ayumi but Tagami finds them and shoots them dead.

Fang's henchman breaks into Yomi's house and beats the whore bloody because she won't tell him where the drugs are. When Yomi returns she stabs the man with a piece of glass from the broken mirror then grabs his dropped gun and skillfully shoots him dead.

When Okumura shows Yomi the bodies of Eto and Ayumi, Yomi gives him the stolen drugs and offers to kill Fang for 50 million yen. Meanwhile, Fang's men begin hunting down and killing all of Okumura's men. Tsuji gives Yomi a gun then handles Fang's underlings at his hideout before Yomi enters and shoots the rest, including Fang and the gay man he rescued earlier. Tsuji checks around and is shot dead by the dying gay man.

Yomi returns to Okumura and shoots Katayama and Okumura dead before collecting his money. Masa, special investigator at the National Police Agency, threatens to arrest Tagami for his involvement in the killings, but Tagami pulls a gun on him and insists that the city is now cleaner.

Yomi tells the whore that he knows that she is working for Tagami. She drives him to the beach to meet Tagami and the two men shoot at each other, leaving Yomi dead. Enraged, she shoots the car, causing it to explode, destroying all of the money.

Pacing through Shinjuku at night, Tagami is approached by some yakuza but ignores them and keeps walking.

== Cast ==
- Hakuryu
- Yumi Iori
- Ruby Moreno
- Kiyoshi Nakajo
- Hiroyuki Watanabe
- Tatsuo Yamada
