= Graveyard of Honor (2002 film) =

- Theatrical poster
- Directed by: Takashi Miike
- Written by: Shigenori Takechi
- Based on: Jingi no Hakaba by Fujita Goro
- Starring: Goro Kishitani
- Cinematography: Hideo Yamamoto
- Edited by: Yasushi Shimamura
- Music by: Kōji Endō
- Distributed by: Daiei Film
- Release date: June 22, 2002
- Running time: 131 minutes
- Country: Japan
- Language: Japanese

Graveyard of Honor (新・仁義の墓場, Shin Jingi no Hakaba; lit. "New Graveyard of Honor") is a yakuza film directed by Takashi Miike. It is a remake of Kinji Fukasaku's 1975 film of the same name, which is based on the life of a real-life Yakuza member.

== Plot ==
Ishimatsu lives a yakuza lifestyle in an extreme manner. When he is ordered to murder another yakuza from another family in a public club, he accepts his orders. He knows that the public execution will lead to his arrest and prosecution for murder, which he knowingly accepts as part of his perceived understanding of the yakuza code of honor. While still free to walk the streets before he is arrested, Ishimatsu visits some of the night clubs and he is attracted to one of the waitresses at a restaurant he stops to eat at. Another of his yakuza friends invites her to visit Ishimatsu at a prearranged hideout, which the yakuza brothers keep for different purposes. When she does visit him that night to accept his invitation, Ishimatsu takes it as his opportunity to pounce on her aggressively and make her his mistress. It turns out that she was likely a virgin as apparently witnessed by the maidenly blood on Ishimatsu's hand after he finished her sexual initiation.

Ishimatsu is soon arrested by police and the trial moves swiftly towards a verdict of guilt for murder and he is sentenced to five years in prison. When in is released from prison, his old yakuza friends come to pick him up at the prison gates. After they greet them, Ishimatsu sees that his old waitress girlfriend has also come to the prison to welcome him back into the civilian world. Ishimatsu is empowered by seeing his old yakuza friends and decides that he will plan to now murder the old bosses in a distorted plan to change the yakuza power networks as they currently exist. The murder of the chief yakuza goes off badly and Ishimatsu becomes the target of a manhunt by other yakuza who wish to avenge the death of their previous crime boss who has just been killed by Ishimatsu.

Word gets out that Ishimatsu has killed one of the crime bosses without authorization and the other crime bosses start a manhunt for him. One of the gangs decides to find him by beating the information out of his girlfriend. When Ishimatsu finds out, he takes a long section of pipe with him to the gang and drops all four of them by beating them into the ground with the pipe. The other crime bosses take this seriously and one of them decides to rat Ishimatsu out to a detective who is anxious to see him behind bars. When Ishimatsu is cornered, he go on a dual wielding shooting on the streets surrounding his apartment with his handguns until he runs out of ammo. The police then arrest him and he is taken in for interrogation.

== Cast ==
- Goro Kishitani as Rikuo Ishimatsu
- Narimi Arimori as Chieko Kikuta
- Yoshiyuki Daichi as Yoshiyuki Ooshita
- Hirotaro Honda as Correctional officer
- Harumi Inoue as Yōko Imamura
- Renji Ishibashi as Denji Yukawa
- Takashi Miike as Restaurant gunman
- Ryōsuke Miki as Kōzō Imamura
- Yasukaze Motomiya as Kanemoto
- Mikio Ōsawa as Masato Yoshikawa
- Daisuke Ryu as Tadaaki Kuze
- Harumi Sone as Ryuuzō Fukui
- Shun Sugata as Toshi Nishizaki
- Tetsurō Tamba as Tetsuji Tokura
- Yoshiyuki Yamaguchi as Shigeru Hashida
- Shingo Yamashiro as Shinobu Sawada
- Shinji Yamashita as Masaru Narimura
- Rikiya Yasuoka as Aoyama
