= The Man in White =

2003 Japanese yakuza film

- Directed by: Takashi Miike
- Written by: Shigenori Takechi (screenplay and story)
- Cinematography: Kazunari Tanaka
- Edited by: Yasushi Shimamura
- Music by: Kōji Endō
- Release date: 2003
- Running time: 95 minutes (part 1); 148 minutes (part 2); 150 minutes (combined international version)
- Country: Japan
- Language: Japanese

The Man in White (許されざる者, Yurusarezaru Mono) is a 2003 Japanese yakuza film directed by Takashi Miike. The DVD release contains two parts, Man in White Part 1 - Bloody Battles of Lions (許されざる者 第一章 獅子の血戦, Yurusarezaru mono daiisshō shishi no kessen) (literal translation: Unforgiven Chapter 1: Bloody Battles of Lions) (95 minutes) and Man in White Part 2 - Requiem for the Lion (許されざる者 第二章 獅子たちの鎮魂歌, Yurusarezaru mono dainishō shishi-tachi no chinkonka) (literal translation: Unforgiven Chapter 2: Requiem for the Lion and His Men) (148 minutes). The international version condenses the story into a single 150-minute film.

== Plot ==
A yakuza gang member seeks revenge after his boss is murdered by an assassin.

== Cast ==
- Masaya Kato as Azusa
- Shōko Aida
- Naomi Akimoto
- Narumi Arimori
- Kenichi Endō
- Tatsuya Fuji
- Mitsuru Hirata
- Renji Ishibashi
- Masaya Kato
- Hiroshi Katsuno
- Kazuki Kitamura
- Masaomi Kondo
- Shigeru Kōyama
- Hiroki Matsukata
- Ryōsuke Miki
- Yasukaze Motomiya
- Hiroyuki Nagato
- Chikage Natsuyama
- Nobuo Kawai
- Jinpachi Nezu
- Masaki Nomura
- Masahiko Tsugawa

== Other credits ==
- Produced by:
  - Michinao Kai - producer
  - Shigeji Maeda - associate planner
  - Fujio Matsushima - planner
  - Makiko Natsuyama - producer
  - Shizuka Natsuyama - executive producer: Cinema Paradise/Shinema Paradaisu
  - Shōichirō Natsuyama - associate planner
  - Yasuko Natsuyama - executive producer: Cinema Paradise/Shinema Paradaisu
  - Tsuneo Seto - planner
  - Kōzō Tadokoro - producer
  - Shigenori Takechi - planner
- Production Design: Tatsuo Ozeki
- Sound Department: Yoshiya Obara - sound

== Reception ==
Reviwer Pedro Morata of asianmoviepulse.com wrote, "In the perhaps golden period of Miike at the beginning of the second millennium, where he already consolidated his cult following, comes 'Man in White', divided into two parts: 'Bloody Battle of Lions' and 'Requiem for the Lion'. There is a single international cut condensed in 150 minutes, but make sure to watch the first and second parts separately to delve deeper into the film and the characters that are presented to us. [...] Miike returns to bring us a violent film, full of action, with a plot very well written, simple but effective, focused on the world of the Yakuzas and, more exactly, on revenge as a developed theme, all adorned with the typical and unsightly styles from the director. Both films complement each other. While one could well see the first part and leave it there without further ado, I consider that the viewing is incomplete without its second part. [...] Nevertheless, the real protagonist here is Miike himself. In this story we will find all or all of its identity signs: Blood, yakuzas, honor, violence without a rest, and all kinds of excesses, although here we can appreciate that Miike himself decides to contain himself a little if we compare it with other works of his filmography. 'The Man in White' as a whole takes advantage of its tragic story to talk about loyalty, family, the meaning of what it is to live and the difficulties of life itself. In addition, the direction is as varied as possible. He directs the camera work in a thousand ways, from the simplest to the most extravagant way possible, moving the camera in a documentary handheld style through various little long takes and getting lost in insignificant details. When it comes to directing the action, the camera moves in a way much similar with the heroic bloodshed films from Hong Kong. In short, if you are a follower of Miike, these two films are a must see. If you are not familiar, it may be a bit tough to watch. Try to see them both considering the whole win in nuances, depth and interest, seeing a single part is a poor snack where there is almost no time for empathy."
