= The Bird People in China =

1998 Japanese film

- Theatrical release poster
- Directed by: Takashi Miike
- Written by: Masa Nakamura
- Based on: The Bird People in China by: Makoto Shiina
- Produced by: Yasuhiko Furusato; Toshiaki Nakazawa
- Starring: Masahiro Motoki; Renji Ishibashi; Mako
- Cinematography: Hideo Yamamoto
- Edited by: Yasushi Shimamura
- Music by: Koji Endo
- Release date: June 10, 1998
- Running time: 118 minutes
- Country: Japan
- Languages: Japanese; Chinese

The Bird People in China (中国の鳥人, Chūgoku no chōjin) is a 1998 Japanese comedy-drama film directed by Takashi Miike from a screenplay by his frequent collaborator Masa Nakamura. The film is considerably more mellow in tone compared to some of the director's more famous works.

== Plot ==
When Mr. Okamura is hospitalized for a hernia, a young Japanese businessman named Mr. Wada is sent as his replacement to assess a vein of jade in a remote village in Yunnan, China. His Chinese guide Mr. Shen does not speak English well but can speak Japanese. A member of the yakuza named Ujiie tells Mr. Wada that his company owes the yakuza money and he forces Mr. Wada to take him along to repay the debt in precious stones. They encounter a Japanese researcher who has found carvings of bird people throughout Japan and seeks to find more in Yunnan, which he believes is the origin of Japanese culture.

After losing their belongings and documents in a storm, they eventually find the village. They encounter a woman with blue eyes who teaches a school for flying as bird people based on diagrams in documents left by her grandfather, a Royal Air Force pilot who crashed near the village many years earlier. The documents are an English translation of an ancient book in an unusual dialect that her grandfather found near the village and Mr. Wada translates them from English into Japanese at the request of Ujiie.

Mr. Wada finds jade and the villagers are excited that this will bring electricity and tourism to their village but Ujiie fears that this will also bring the difficulties of the modern world, including crime, to the remote village. He kills the tortoises being used to pull their raft, then threatens to shoot Mr. Wada, Mr. Shen, and the ferryman in order to prevent modern civilization from exploiting the village. Mr. Wada convinces him to try to fly using the artificial wings from the school but they both crash.

In the following years, Ujiie becomes the village development advisor while Mr. Wada returns to Japan and raises a family.

== Cast ==
Actor	Role
Masahiro Motoki	Wada (the businessman)
Renji Ishibashi	Ujiie (the yakuza)
Mako	Shen (the guide)
Li Li Wang	Yan, Si-chang
Michiko Kichise	
Yuichi Minato	
Tomohiko Okuda	
Manzo Shinra	

== Production ==
The scenery of China is something not usually explored in Japanese film and thus was a massive change of pace for Miike, and a far cry from the recurrent themes of violence and sexuality present in his other films. Chinese locations in the movie include Dali City, Yunnan, where the characters enter through a stone arched gate and the Nujiang River, where they see people riding pulleys on steel cables over the water.

== Themes ==
The film explores themes of ecology and Third World versus First World, depicting the East as a legendary place having a mystical knowledge not shared by the West (including Japan), but deepens its message by inserting the character of the grandfather, a former British pilot. Near the end, the yakuza plans to kill the visiting foreigners in order to keep the village away from civilization, but is reminded that in order to get to the village he had to use trains and airplanes.

The movie's message is a mixed one, showing the good and the bad both of technology and tradition. The film shares the same humanistic message and feel found in most of Miike's works.

== Awards ==
The film was screened at a number of festivals before being released in theatrical distribution. It won the Audience Award at the 1998 Hawaii International Film Festival.
