= QP (TV series) =

2011 Japanese TV series

- Poster
- QP
- Genre: Action
- Based on: QP外伝 (QP Side Story) by Hiroshi Takahashi
- Screenplay by: Masa Nakamura
- Directed by: Takashi Miike (5 episodes); Kyōsuke Yabe (1 episode); Shintarō Sugawara (2 episodes); Takeshi Watanabe (4 episodes)
- Starring: Takumi Saitoh
- Theme music composer: Lenny Kravitz (opening theme); Maximum the Hormone (closing theme)
- Composer: Yoshihiro Ike
- Country of origin: Japan
- Original language: Japanese
- No. of episodes: 12

Production
- Producers: Shigeji Maeda; Misako Saka; Tetsuya Sakashita; Atsushi Satō
- Running time: 23 minutes
- Production companies: D.N. Dream Partners; Forecast Communications; Hulk Entertainment; Nippon Television Network; Oriental Light and Magic; Shonengahosha; Video Audio Project

Original release
- Network: Nippon Television
- Release: October 6 – December 29, 2011

QP is a 2011 Japanese twelve-episode action television series based on the manga QP外伝 (QP Side Story) by Hiroshi Takahashi. Despite its title, it is not an adaptation of the main QP manga series, but rather an adaptation of a side story series titled QP外伝 (QP Side Story) focused on the character Ryo Azuma. It is set in the same universe as Takahashi's Crows and Worst manga series. Five episodes were directed by Takashi Miike, 4 episodes were directed by Takeshi Watanabe, 2 episodes were directed by Shintarō Sugawara, and 1 episode was directed by Kyōsuke Yabe. The series originally aired from October 6, 2011 (listed in Japanese television listings as Wednesday, October 5, though it actually aired after midnight, making it Thursday, October 6), to December 29, 2011. No episode was aired on Thursday, December 15.

== Synopsis ==
Aspiring boxer Misaki Gen must retire from the sport after sustaining an injury to his hand. Out of work and desperate, he encounters the charismatic Ryo Azuma and joins his yakuza clan, the Tenrou-kai, in which Tom, Jerry, and Hiko are also members. The Tenrou-kai becomes embroiled in conflict with two other yakuza clans, Yokomizo-gumi and the Furuwa-gumi.

== Cast ==
- Takumi Saitoh as Ryo Azuma
- Nobuaki Kaneko as Tom
- Gota Watanabe as Jerry
- Kento Hayashi as Gen Misaki
- Kenchi Tachibana as Mario (credited as KENCHI (EXILE))
- Masataka Kubota as Age
- Dai Watanabe as Ryosuke Kimizuka
- Kyosuke Yabe Kanemitsu Hachiya
- Tomoroo Taguchi Hiko
- Yoshiki Arisono
- Kippei Shiina Hitoshi Kitajima
- Kōhei Watanabe as Yoshikawa
- Shintarō Yamada as Detective
- Takashi Miike as Kitō
- Kōsei Amano as Masaharu Kawashima
- Ayuta Nogami
- Kazuhiro Morisato
- Kentaro Kishi
- Junko Sawa
- Terunosuke Takezai
- Peyton Chiba
- Yuki Sukuki
- Shigeru Fukuda
- Jigoro (慈五郎)
- Kazuyoshi Ozawa
- Takeshi Yamamoto
- Denden
- Kazuhiko Kanayama
- Hiroki Sakurano
- Suzunosuke
- Taro Suwa
- Katsuya
- Hiroshige Amano
- Issei Okihara
- Koji Motegi
- Hiroshi Takahashi
- Takahiro Kuroishi
- Manzo Shinra (森羅万象)
- Takashi Ito
- Rion Inoue
- Yuto Nakano

== Episodes ==
No.	Title	Directed by	Original release date
1	"ロードランナー (Rōdo ranna) ("Roadrunner")"	Takashi Miike	October 6, 2011
2	"カーブミラー (Kābu mirā) ("Curved Mirror")"	Takashi Miike	October 13, 2011
3	"サマートライアングル (Samā toraianguru) ("Summer Triangle")"	Takashi Miike	October 20, 2011
4	"ウルトラメンソール (Urutora mensōru) ("Ultra Menthol")"	Kyōsuke Yabe	October 27, 2011
5	"ラッキーナンバー (Rakkī nanbā) ("Lucky Number")"	Shintarō Sugawara	November 3, 2011
6	"シマブクロ (Shimabukuro) ("Shimabukuro")"	Takeshi Watanabe	November 10, 2011
7	"クロスロード (Kurosurōdo) ("Crossroad")"	Takeshi Watanabe	November 17, 2011
8	"ファイヤーフライ (Faiyāfurai) ("Firefly")"	Takeshi Watanabe	November 24, 2011
9	"AV ("AV")"	Takeshi Watanabe	December 1, 2011
10	"ブルームーン (Burūmūn) ("Blue Moon")"	Shintarō Sugawara	December 8, 2011
11	"ラビッツフット (Rabittsufutto) ("Rabbit's Foot")"	Takashi Miike	December 22, 2011
12	"ウィンター・トライアングル (Wintā toraianguru) ("Winter Triangle")"	Takashi Miike	December 29, 2011

== Production ==
The role of Ryo Azuma was originally to be played by Sōsuke Takaoka, who had previously acted in Takashi Miike's film Crows Zero based on Takahashi's manga Crows, but Takaoka was dropped from the series and cut ties with his agency after making negative comments on Twitter about his disdain for the Korean Wave of entertainment, despite having previously played a Korean in the film Break Through! (2005). Takaoka was replaced by Takumi Saitoh, who had previously acted in Miike's films 13 Assassins, Ace Attorney, and For Love's Sake.

== Music ==
The opening theme was "Looking Back on Love" by Lenny Kravitz. The closing theme was "Black ¥ Power G-Men Spy" (ブラック￥パワーGメンスパイ) by Maximum the Hormone.

== Broadcast ==
The series debuted on Nippon Television on Thursday, October 6, 2011, at 1:29 AM. Subsequent episodes aired every Thursday at 0:59 AM. No episode was aired on Thursday, December 15. The final episode aired on December 29, 2011.

== Soundtrack album ==
A soundtrack album, QP Original Soundtrack, was released on December 7, 2011, during the original run of the television series.

== Comic adaptation ==
A comic adaptation of the TV drama, QP外伝 我妻涼 (QP Side Story: Ryo Azuma), written by Kyōsuke Yabe and Masa Nakamura and featuring Ryo Azuma as the main character, was released a low-priced book at convenience stores around the same time that the drama was airing. It was initially published up to issue 8, but the comic series was left unfinished when it was discontinued. In 2013, the magazine Play Comic published by Akita Shoten announced that it would reprint the original 8 issues and that it would create new comic adaptations of the rest of the episodes of the series starting from episode 9.

Volume one was released on June 7, 2013, ISBN 978-4-253-25201-0
Volume two was released on October 18, 2013, ISBN 978-4-253-25202-7
Volume three was released on May 20, 2014, ISBN 978-4-253-25203-4
Volume four was released on November 20, 2014, ISBN 978-4-253-25204-1

== Home video ==
Nippon Television released a DVD box and Blu-ray box of the episodes in widescreen format with an 8-page booklet. Bonus features include a collection of promotional videos produced by director Takashi Miike.

== Reception ==
Reviewing the first episode for the website Asian Movie Pulse, reviewer Panos Kotzathanasis wrote that "the script seems to stray quite away from the original." The reviewer noted the high production values and apparent high budget of the series, writing, "Evidently, NTV (Nippon Television) did not cut down on expenses with this one, as, apart from Miike, the cast consists of Takumi Saito as Azuma and Kippei Shiina as the leader of the Yokomizo clan, the production values are of the highest level, and the episode even includes a song by Lenny Kravitz. Overall, the title points more to a movie than a TV episode, both technically and aesthetically." The reviewer also noted that "seems to adore Saito, who looks cooler than ever, with the fact that he says very little also adding to that sense, while the sequence of him under pain and naked is as sensual as possible, despite the lack of full nudity."
