= Yamegoku: Yakuza Yamete Itadakimasu =

- Promotional image
- Genre: Drama
- Written by: Takeharu Sakurai
- Directed by: Yukihiko Tsutsumi; Shin Katō; Toshio Tsuboi; Tatsuya Shiraishi
- Starring: Yuko Oshima; Kazuki Kitamura; Ryo Katsuji; Tsubasa Honda; Yūko Natori; Kenichi Endō
- Opening theme: "Sekai wa Owaranai" by Thinking Dogs
- Country of origin: Japan
- Original language: Japanese
- No. of series: 1
- No. of episodes: 10

Production
- Producers: Hiroki Ueda; Yūsuke Itō; Chiaki Kusu
- Running time: 54 minutes

Original release
- Network: TBS
- Release: 16 April – 18 June 2015

Yamegoku: Yakuza Yamete Itadakimasu (Japanese: ヤメゴク〜ヤクザやめて頂きます〜), also known as Yamegoku: Helpline Cop, is a Japanese television drama series that premiered on TBS on 16 April 2015. This is Yuko Oshima's first time starring in the lead role of a serial drama. It received an average viewership rating of 6.5%.

== Cast ==
- Yuko Oshima as Bakushū Nagamitsu, a detective (Leading role)
- Kazuki Kitamura as Kakeru Mikajima
- Ryo Katsuji as Naomichi Sano, an advisor at the Yakuza countermeasure center
- Tsubasa Honda as Haruka Nagamitsu, Bakushū's sister and a nurse
- Tetsushi Tanaka as Hakubun Ishiyama, Bakushū's supervisor
- Ken Shōnozaki as Ken Tōjō, Bakushū's colleague
- Kouki Okada as Kouki Mizuhara, a detective
- Sayaka Yamaguchi as Shōko Aridome, a doctor
- Mio Miyatake as Sakura Nagamitsu, Bakushū's sister and a high school student
- Emiko Matsuoka as Yuka Mikajima, Bakushū's colleague
- Erena Kamata as Haru Mikajima
- Makiya Yamaguchi as Eitoku Tanigawa, a personal section manager at a police department
- Kim Sungrak as Senichi Mizuta, a Yakuza head
- Tadashi Sakata as Kiichirō Fujita
- Yūko Natori as Yumiko Nagamitsu, Bakushū's mother and a child care worker
- Kenichi Endō as Isao Tachibana, a Yakuza head

== Episodes ==
No.	Title	Directed by	Original release date	Viewers (%)
1	"堤幸彦最新シリーズ！喪服の女警官とマル暴刑事 人情任侠事件簿"	Yukihiko Tsutsumi	16 April 2015	9.1
2	"人の再生を邪魔する奴は許さねえ 麦秋怒りの鉄拳！！！！"	Yukihiko Tsutsumi	23 April 2015	6.7
3	"秘密の依頼 娘の恋人がヤクザ！！"	Shin Katō	30 April 2015	6.0
4	"極道の妻VS女刑事!! 母の涙の訳"	Toshio Tsuboi	7 May 2015	6.2
5	"親の愛、友の情"	Yukihiko Tsutsumi	14 May 2015	6.4
6	"麦秋の過去を知る男"	Shin Katō	21 May 2015	6.1
7	"狙われた家族"	Toshio Tsuboi	28 May 2015	5.2
8	"兄が出所!?女弁護士との智略戦"	Tatsuya Shiraishi	4 June 2015	5.8
9	"残酷な真実"	Yukihiko Tsutsumi	11 June 2015	6.2
10	"命が示す人生道"	Yukihiko Tsutsumi	18 June 2015	6.2

== Curiosities ==
- Kazuki Kitamura and Kenichi Endō have already performed together in 2014 in The Raid 2, as well as Yakuzas: Kenichi Endō as Hideaki Goto, head of Goto Family, a powerful yakuza family from Japan and one of two mob bosses that control Jakarta and Kazuki Kitamura as Ryuichi, the main Goto lieutenant and interpreter.
- Yuko Oshima, the protagonist of this drama, is a former member from AKB48, one of the biggest groups of J-pop and Japan.
- Before Isao Tachibana, Kenichi Endō had already been portrayed/interpreted two notorious fictional yakuza bosses in previous films: Joji Yazaki in Crows Zero and Crows Zero 2 and Hideaki Goto in The Raid 2: Berandal. In the first two films, he is the main antagonist, and in The Raid 2 he is a kind of anti-hero / anti-villain.
- Actors with previous experiences in productions involving Yakuza: Kazuki Kitamura (Dead or Alive (film), Like a Dragon and The Raid 2), Ryo Katsuji (Crows Explode), Tetsushi Tanaka (Get Up! and Outrage Beyond), and Kenichi Endō (Like a Dragon, Crows Zero, Crows Zero 2, The Raid 2: Berandal, Dead or Alive 2: Birds and more).
- It is possible that Senichi Mizuta, one of the bosses of the Yakuza and one of characters of this series is Zainichi Korean, mainly because he is interpreted by a Korean Zainichi, Kim Sung-Rak. With that it is quite possible that he was inspired by Machii Hisayuki, "The Ginza Tiger" and founder of Toa-kai or Tokutaro Takayama, one of bosses of Aizukotetsu-kai.

Preceded by Utsukushiki Wana: Zanka Ryōran (8 January 2015 - 12 March 2015)	TBS Thursday Dramas; Thursdays 21:00 - 21:54 (JST)	Succeeded by 37.5-do no Namida (9 July 2015 - )
