= List of Worst characters =

Worst is a Japanese manga series written and illustrated by Hiroshi Takahashi. The plot revolves around a group of teenage boys who fight their way through the notorious high school, Suzuran.

== First Part ==
Suzuran

The delinquent school whose reputation roars in other prefectures as the most notorious of all. Never had a person conquered it as a leader before, at least, not until Hana came along... One of the Four Powers.

Housen

The Housen Killer Corps, led by a strict military-like chain-of-command. King Joe formerly stood at its top, the seat is now handed to Mitsumasa. Traditional enemies of Suzuran. Distinctive with their bald heads. One of the Four Powers.

Kurotaki Alliance

Formerly one of the greatest powers in the city, a gathering of many schools, the Alliance has now dissolved. One of the Powers.

The Front of Armament

A bosozoku group. One of the Four Powers.

Zeniya Group

A group based in Osaka, led by Dosuken. Ogawa Chiharu is a member of that group.

== Second Part ==
Suzuran

Where people such as Tsukishima Hana and Hanaki Guriko (The Womanizer extraordinaire) hail from. Anarchy and chaos reign in it. Reputed to be the worst, and strongest school in the area.

Housen

Tsukimoto Mitsumasa and the Moonlight Brothers now lead it, aiming to build up the great empire of Housen once more.

Jet Black Scorpion

Is now a puppet used by Amachi.

Amachi's Army

After Amachi transferred to Rindow after being beaten by Hana, he began taking over the schools in the lawless Kurotaki Alliance district, using Rindow High as a base. At the peak of their strength, more than 300 men would move under Amachi's order.

The Front of Armament

Part II of Worst begins with TFOA on its sixth generation. The seventh Generation was stated to be a generation that would become the strongest in the Armament's history.

== Umehoshi Household ==
Tsukishima Hana

The protagonist. He came from a rural town where telephone signals don't reach. Joined Suzuran as a Freshman and in the First Year War, defeated Amachi becoming the winner, and by default the leader of the First Year's. He declared he'd become the leader of Suzuran, broaching a taboo subject no one has dared shed light upon. Hana is the resident of room 5 at the Umehoshi Household. Helps his friends no matter what. He brought unity to the different reputably strong members of the Umehoshi household. He is close friends with the other residents. Every morning goes for a 40–60 km jog. Eats a lot, especially rice, eating more than three bowls for breakfast every day. Nicknamed baldy. He is now a sophomore at Suzuran, and leader of the Hana-Gumi faction.

Sakota Takefumi

During his middle school days, people feared him as the Kishi Mid Dinosaur. He is a member of the Hana-Gumi and also a sophomore at Suzuran. At the Umehoshi Household he is resident of room 6. Tried to establish himself as the top dog in the Umehoshi household previously, but failed when Hana beat him.

Fujishiro Takumi

He has a history with Amachi and the Armament's Shougo, though the details are still unclear. Apparently, all three came from the same school. A member of the Umehoshi family, and resident of room 2. Sakota had remarked to Renji once that it might be possible that Takumi was stronger than both of them, and characters had noted before that he was a man with a cool head on his shoulders. Takumi dropped out of Kurosaki High School and is now working at a garage. Joined The Front of Armament and became the vice-head under Murata Shougo.

Mutou Renji

With brains and brawn, he's a rare case at Suzuran. He has an older brother named, Shin. He is now a member of Hana-Gumi and also a sophomore at Suzuran. He seems to run the shadow force of Hana-gumi along with Asai, the tactician of Hana-gumi. Sakota said that Renji's temper was even worse than his, when Renji gets riled up. He attended Sanchuu in middle school. He is the resident of room 1 at the Umehoshi Household.

Tominaga Toranosuke

Weak at strength but strong at heart. Is a virtual encyclopedia on the gangs running Suzuran, as shown during the First Year War when he identified the seniors. A member of the Umehoshi family, resident of room 3, and a sophomore at Suzuran. Seems to have a talent with darts and bowling. He set up a Suzuran Darting Club with Ginji.

Umehoshi Masashi

The Landlord of the Umehoshi Household. He has the appearance and feel of a mafia leader. Even though he and his brother often argue often over Mary's choice to become a woman, when others insult Mary's choice, Masashi will stand up for Mary.

Umehoshi Yasushi

AKA Mary. The younger brother of Umehoshi Masashi, who helps by cooking at the Umehoshi Household. He is also goes by the name Mari or Mary. Enjoys scaring people, said that Sakota was the easiest to terrify. De Niro does not acknowledge her as a human.

== Suzuran ==
=== 27th Suzuran Generation ===
Hanazawa Saburou

AKA Zetton. A lone wolf, and the strongest senior of Suzuran in Hana's first year. A pervert and a happy-go-lucky kind of guy. Was a senior who supported Hana. Currently studying to become a teacher, planning on returning to Suzuran as one.

Yonezaki Takayuki

Senior at Suzuran in Hana's first year, and a lone wolf. Very calm and cool-headed. Engineered Hana and Guriko's first meeting with Zetton. Normally quiet, but when he opens his mouth to speak, his opinions are often highly valued. He and Gunji can be said to be the foils to Zetton, Hideyoshi and Masa's loud personalities. Left to work in a bar in Roppongi.

Katou Hideyoshi

Senior at Suzuran in Hana's first year, and the leader of the Hideyoshi Faction. Proud and brash, seems to have luck with the ladies, a fact that the other seniors are not very happy about. Nicknamed Mad Dog. Left for Tokyo when he graduated, along with Masa.

Iwashiro Gunji

Senior at Suzuran in Hana's first year, and the leader of the Iwashiro Faction. Very calm and cool-headed. He and Yonezaki can be said to be the foils to Zetton, Hideyoshi and Masa's loud personalities. Remained in the city to continue the family business.

Kobayashi Masanari

AKA Masa. Hideyoshi's right-hand man and best friend. A senior at Suzuran in Hana's first year. The attack on him by a Housen student and Hideyoshi's subsequent revenge can be said to be the spark that started the Suzuran vs. Housen war. Left for Tokyo along with Hideyoshi when they graduated.

=== 28th Suzuran Generation ===
Hanaki Guriko

Hailing from Kyushu. He's Suzuran's No.1 The entire city's Strongest Man. He is also a womanizer extraordinaire and is always in a jolly, trickster-like manner. Many people challenge for Guriko, who is only interested in women and not in fighting, in order to take his title as the Strongest. He is a sophomore at Suzuran in Hana's first year, and is currently a senior. He tends to go into a blind rage whenever someone messes with his phone or makes fun of his womanizing. When he was sophomore he was rarely present in school. After becoming a senior, he is seen more often, mostly on the roof, which seems to be the place for seniors or the school's leaders at Suzuran. When he's in his fits, Guriko doesn't bother telling the difference between friends and enemies, for example, his often takes out his anger on Kinji, who always seems to be around. He is very protective of his 9 girlfriends, and will turn dead serious and take out his wrath with extreme prejudice on any man who flirts with, or dares to bother his girlfriends.

Kurosawa Kazumitsu

He has no faction, but is considered Guriko's right-hand man. He is a sophomore at Suzuran in Hana's first year. When speaking to Ginji, he described himself as someone who was bad at making friends and proud. Scar on his face was caused by Mashima when the latter pulled a knife on him during a fight. Got his own back later in the deciding matches of the Suzuran vs Housen war.

Kanbe Yoshikatsu

Nicknamed Butcher. He is the Don of the biggest faction at Suzuran, FBI. He is a sophomore at Suzuran in Hana's first year. Loud and believes strongly in his subordinates. Was disillusioned when it turned out that one of them was the mole in the Suzuran vs Jet Black Scorpion's war. Tried to make one, last failed grab for power at Suzuran.

Harada Tokio

He inherited the Iwashiro Faction, which is now known as the Harada Faction. He is a sophomore at Suzuran in Hana's first year. Dissolved it when he reacher senior year, stating that he had no more time to run it.

=== 29th Suzuran Generation ===
Tsukishima Hana, Takefumi Sakota, Mutou Renji and Tominaga Toranosuke are in this batch.

Yaita Ikumi

Same year as Hana. Seemed to have a long-running rivalry with Sakota from middle-school. Entered Suzuran High and subsequently made it to the second round of the First Year War. Technically, he and Hana were the only other ones to be not defeated by Amachi, as he was hospitalized on that day from food poisoning. Later joined the Hana-gumi at Sakota's invitation. Nicknamed "Grey-haired-kun" by Hana. Murakawa calls him the AV King, so called for his hidden stash of X-rated videos.

Ozaki Kenichi

Same year as Hana. Seemed to have a long-running rivalry with Renji from middle school. Provoked Renji on the first day of school by mentioning his brother, backed off after Renji grew angry. During the First Year War, his opponent was Amachi Hisashi, who promptly broke his arm and started kicking him when down. Later joined the Hana-gumi, though initially reluctant to join. Renji later persuaded him by telling him that "Every family needs a shadowy guy like you."

Murakawa Katsuhiro

Same year as Hana. Entered the First Year War, and was promptly knocked out by Hana. Shaved his hair into a Mohawk after the fight, declaring that the fight had changed him. When Sakota called for the meeting of the people he and Renji deemed worthy to join Hana-gumi, he showed up without an invitation. Still joined Hana-gumi though. Seems to have a tendency to give people nicknames, often hangs around with Yaita and Ozaki.

Asai Takahito

Same year as Hana. Formerly of Butcher's group, FBI. Later joined Hana-gumi when Renji suggested he be used as a liaison between both FBI (who was allowed to remain as a group) and Hana-gumi. When Yaita and Murakawa try to take him out for a bonding session, he ignores them at first. Later reacts when Murakawa and Yaita tells him that the latter has a stash of 56 videos unsuitable for little children. Subsequently, Murakawa nicknames him the "Silent Pervert". Runs the shadow force of Hana-gumi along with Renji.

Yamaguchi Ranmaru

Same year as Hana. Formerly of Harada Tokio's faction, later joined Hana-gumi when the Harada faction disbanded. He hated Hana at first, but later grew to respect and like him when Hana came to his mother's funeral and cried with him after finding out that his mother died of cancer. Says that even though Hana isn't any good with basketball, when Hana is on the team, everybody feels energized, and most importantly, that they can have fun, regardless of winning or losing. Constantly mooches cigarettes and beer off people.

=== 30th Suzuran Graduates ===
Daizen Tsutomu

AKA Tetsuwan Tstomu. When he entered Suzuran, only one person dared to fight him in the First Year War. Is huge and very big-sized, doesn't seem to have much of a sense of style. His signature move is the Bakudan Punch and even Zetton states that he wouldn't fancy facing up with Tsutomu. However, was defeated by both Guriko and Hana when he challenged them. Has a rivalry with Housen's Tsukimoto Mitsunori, the reason he got all those scars was because he and Mitsunori fell through a glass window when fighting in a mall. Takes insults to his looks very seriously. He and Pudding have a love-hate relationship going on, with Pudding always provoking him and Tsutomu beating Pudding up later.

Nakamura Ginji

Knows Kurosawa. Was the only person who dared fight Tsutomu in the First Year War, was beaten quickly. Said to have been sent to the hospital three times by Tsutomu. Kurosawa comments that Ginji has a personality similar to himself when he first entered Suzuran, and cautioned Ginji that he should not follow him as he would end up with nothing. Later steered him towards Hana, telling him that he was a man that possesses something both he and Ginji lacks. Loves darts, and later set up a Suzuran Darting Club with Tora.

Akaike Yuuji

AKA Akaji. Stayed around in the First Year War to watch Tsutomu and Ginji both battle it out. Apparently, he was one of the few who dared fight with Tsutomu in middle-school. Has a tendency to pull out a comb and comb his hair wherever he is.

Aoyama Kouji

AKA Aoji. Stayed around in the First Year War to watch Tsutomu and Ginji both battle it out. Apparently, he was one of the few who dared fight with Tsutomu in middle-school. Has a tendency to mix up his idioms.

Sawaguchi Masaru

AKA Pudding. Stayed around in the First Year War to watch Tsutomu and Ginji both battle it out. Earned his nickname after failing to steal some pudding during his middle-school days. Went to the same middle-school as Yaita Ikumi. Enjoys insulting Tsutomu, and often gets beaten up over it. He and Tsutomu have something of a love-hate relationship over it.

== Housen ==
=== King Joe's Generation ===
Kanayama Jou

AKA King Joe. The king who rules Housen with an iron fist. The undisputed leader of Housen at his time, however, towards the end, cracks were showing in his iron reign. Pushed by the Moonlight Brothers to start the war between Suzuran and Housen. When Armament people commented that King Joe's reign might be coming to and end, Takeda Kousei stepped in and informed them that Joe was not as weak as they would believe. Was one of the Four Powers. Took advantage of the Suzuran vs Housen war to pass the reins onto the Moonlight Brothers, was the only one who won in the 5 vs 5 deciding match between Housen and Suzuran.

Tsukimoto Mitsunobu

The eldest of the Moonlight Brothers. Was the one who pushed King Joe to start a war with Suzuran. Fought with Guriko in the 5 vs 5 deciding matches, and was never quite the same after that. Has low blood pressure, so he is always dazed in mornings. However, if you whisper "Guriko" in his ear, he will wake up immediately. When he graduated, he started work in a delivery service. Was beaten up by Muroto Zenmei and the Naitou twins, thus forcing Housen to start a war with Amachi.

Jun Ujiie

Hates it when people call him Uu-jii. Was among those who led the initial attacks against Suzuran. King Joes's second-in-command.

Katsutoshi Ebana

King Joe's 3rd-in-command. He's the one who led the ambush on Yonezaki in the war between Housen and Suzuran.

=== Tsukimoto Mitsuyoshi's Year ===
Tsukimoto Mitsuyoshi

Second oldest of the Moonlight Brothers. Has a bone to pick with Ujiie, often provoking him by calling him Uu-jii. Faced up against Butcher in the 5 vs 5 matches. Has an obsession with drama serials.

Kazuya Mashima

Gave Kurosawa his scar. Pulls out a knife when pushed into a corner.

=== Tsukimoto Mitsumasa's Year ===
Tsukimoto Mitsumasa

Same age as Hana. Third oldest of the Moonlight Brothers. During his first year, he was a carefree kind of guy, refusing to listen to the seniors and basically only joining in on the war when there was fun to be had. Commented that Hana, Amachi and Shougo were interesting guys to watch out for. All changed when the reins were passed to him. Became more mature and a smart tactician. Lost to Hana on a one on one.

Ono Teruki

Mitsumasa's second-in-command. Refused to join up with Mitsumasa at first, but later joined up when he saw how Mitsumasa challenged King Joe. Smart and levelheaded. Was described by Mitsumasa as a lone wolf.

Ootani Ken

Mitsumasa's childhood friend. Seemingly calm, but later grew on to become a hotheaded guy. Currently and important member in Housen's ruling committee.

Matsuo Daisuke

Challenged Mitsumasa on the first day of school but was defeated. Currently an important member in Housen's ruling committee.

Miura Satoru

Mitsumasa's friend. Later betrayed Mitsumasa because of personal reasons.

==== Tsukimoto Mitsunori's Year ====
Tsukimoto Mitsunori

The fourth of the Moonlight Brothers. Respects Mitsumasa and is willing to go down on knees and beg for him. Has a long-running rivalry with Tsutomu of Suzuran.

Fukuura Daisuke aka Fukusuke

He was the leader of a group of freshmen that didn't particularly disagree with Mitsunori about who was the leader of the freshmen (or Housen in its entirety) rather, he just wanted to be free.

Tajima Takahiro aka Turbo

Freshman at Housen. Helped Mitsunori convince Daisuke to fall under his leadership.

== The Front of Armament ==
=== 5th Generation ===
Takeda Kousei

Head of the 5th TFOA Generation. An upright man who was formerly one of the Four Powers. Retired due to an illness, recovered subsequently. Punched Shinji when he found out that Shinji dissolved the 5th Generation without telling him and later expresses concern that TFOA might split up, as Tesshou and Kiyohiro both could not stand each other.

Yanagi Shinji

Vice-head of the 5th TFOA Generation. Kousei's strong right hand, he passed his TFOA jacket onto Takumi, urging him to consider joining TFOA as he did so. Made the call to dissolve the 5th Generation without Kousei knowing when he found out that Kousei had an illness.

Inada Genji

5th Generation T.F.O.A member under Takeda Kousei. Responsible for Tesshou.

=== 6th Generation ===
Kawachi Tesshou

He is the Sixth Head of the Front of Armament. He has challenged Guriko more than any other. Loud, brash and charismatic. Had a terrible relationship with Yoshimi Kiyohiro, got along with him after he beat Kiyohiro in a battle to decide who was the 6th Head. Still annoys Kiyohiro from time to time, and says that Kiyohiro was the first person in TFOA's history to beat up the Head on a daily basis. Even so, he and Kiyohiro were firm comrades. Is determined to train Shougo as the 7th Head of TFOA, going so far as to beat him up when he found out that Shougo went behind his back to invite Takumi. Shougo comments that Tesshou was a natural leader. Died in a car accident.

Yoshimi Kiyohiro

Vice-head of 6th TFOA Generation. He and Tesshou had a terrible relationship from long ago, but subsequently, got along with him after a battle to decide who was the 6th Head. Formerly wanted to resign from TFOA if he loses the battle, but Tesshou told him to stay as the Vice-Head if he loses. Tesshou still annoys him from time to time, and he never hesitates to pull his punches when Tesshou annoys him. Even so, both were firm comrades. Seems to be the calmer, more levelheaded counterpart to Tesshou's brashness. When Tesshou died, Kiyohiro visited the site of the accident, crying while asking what would he do without Tesshou.

Togawa Shouta

Close friend of Tesshou, promised his seniors in the 5th Generation to keep an eye on Kiyohiro and Tesshou.

Sugitani Shouhei

Seemingly levelheaded man. Often seen smoking. Went with Kiyohiro when Kiyohiro gathered up people to follow Tesshou when the latter went off alone with Murata Shougo to a mediation meeting between TFOA, Hyakki and Kyouya.

Sahashi Mamoru

Member of the 6th Generation.

Kataoka Kouji

Member of the 6th Generation. Was beaten up by members of Kyouya after Shougo and others attacked their members.

Nanba Takeshi

Known as the Silent Tank. Said to be on par with Tesshou, not one for words. Constantly wears a metal mask. Turns out that he was burned when he was young, and soon barred himself from socializing with others. His mother wept for him daily. Tesshou moved in not long after, and somehow discovered that his next door neighbour had a son. Exploded into the room Nanba was hiding and promptly went on to scream that he was causing his mother to cry for him and that he was a useless bastard. Nanba said that he was shocked by Tesshou's loud voice when they first met, though subsequently, they became friends. Stayed with the 7th generation briefly to redeem himself to Teeshou

=== 7th Generation ===
Murata Shougo

Head of the 7th TFOA Generation. Brother of Murata Juuzou. Same year as Hana, and an old friend of Takumi Fujishiro. Seems to have dealings with Amachi in the past, though the details are unclear. The scar on his face was left by Amachi. An upright, honest man who treasures the bond of friendship, when an old middle-school friend got beaten up by gang members of Kyouya, he went after them, not caring of the consequences. Witnessed Tesshou's death. Went missing when Tesshou died, came back with a new resolve.

Kim Hyongan

Levelheaded analyst of the 7th Generation. Close friends with Nara Akira and Murata Shougo. Accompanied Shougo to get his revenge on the Kyouya members.

Nara Akira

Aggressive member of the 7th Generation. Close friends with Kim Hyongan and Murata Shougo. Accompanied Shougo to get his revenge on the Kyouya members.

Kobayashi Ichizen aka Zen

7th Generation Member of The Front Of Armament. After losing to Shougo in a fight, Shougo later used the opportunity to introduce Zen to Tesshou.

== Amachi's Army ==
Amachi Hisashi

He left Suzuran after losing to Hana at the First Year War. He then enrolled at Rindow High. Amachi is aiming to dominate all of the high schools, with Suzuran as the top prize. He is now a sophomore at Rindow High. A ruthless man who uses money and violence to get what he wants.

Muroto Zenmei

The older of the two Arson Brothers. A paid underling of Amachi and well-known thug. Rapist, robber and arsonist. Violent and unpredictable. Formerly used as a yakuza tool before joining up with Amachi.

Muroto Koumei

The younger of the two Arson Brothers. A paid underling of Amachi and a well-known thug. Seems to know Daitou Takashi. Joined up with Amachi when Amachi told him that he was able to clear Koumei's fathers debt and bring Zenmei back.

Kagawa Kazuya

AKA Gaga. Amachi's right-hand man. A fan of bad guys.

Daitou Takashi

Seems to know Muroto Koumei. Was beaten up by Amachi, subsequently joined him. Tactician of the group. Said by Koumei to have a good head on his shoulders and fast with his fists.

Naitou Ichie

Dangerous thug that Zenmei met in juvie. Twin elder brother of Naitou Ichigo.

Naitou Ichigo

Dangerous thug that Zenmei met in juvie. Twin younger brother of Naitou Ichie.

== Manji Empire ==
=== Vice-Head ===
Taniyoshi Tomo

==== Kuzutora Group ====
Boss
Taniyoshi Tomo

==== Zento Group ====
Boss
Higuchi Shuuji

==== Masuda Group ====
Boss
Inoue Tatsumi

==== Shutou Group ====
Boss
Nakano Issei

==== Kinjou Group ====
Boss
Anan Yoshiki

==== Odaken Group ====
Boss
Shibaki Masami

==== Hiruma Group ====
Boss
Hiruma Yuuji

==== Kuzugami Group ====
Boss
Ebisu Koiuchi

== Others ==
Sera Naoki

Renji's junior high friend and a highly regarded fighter. He leads Kawa 2nd High as Nakajima Shinsuke's Successor. It is said that in all his fights with Sakota, he never went down. Amachi came to him personally to battle it out with him.

Ogawa Chiharu

A member of Osaka's Zeniya Family. Came to town under the protection of the Front of Armament and stirred up trouble. Fought with Hana and lost.

Sakurada Asao aka Abo

The boss of Yuri South High. Well known for both challenging Guriko 3 times, and his right cross that has taken out both Yaita and Murakawa in one hit. Seems to be good acquaintances with Sera.

Yamaguchi Zenjirou

Kurosaki Industrial student, same year as Hana. Initially challenged Takumi to test both of their strength. Zenjirou would go on to be good friends of Takumi and Kuwahara. Would later join TFOA.

Kuwahara Nobuaki

Kurosaki Industrial student, same year as Hana. A friend of Takumi's, he isn't the greatest fighter but proves himself through his loyalty. Would later join TFOA.
