= 13 Assassins (2010 film) =

2010 film by Takashi Miike

- Original Japanese theatrical film poster
- Directed by: Takashi Miike
- Screenplay by: Daisuke Tengan
- Story by: Shōichirō Ikemiya
- Based on: 13 Assassins by Eiichi Kudo
- Produced by: Michihiko Umezawa; Minami Ichikawa; Tôichirô Shiraishi; Kazuomi Suzaki; Hisashi Usui; Takahiro Ohno; Hirotsugu Yoshida; Shigeji Maeda
- Starring: Koji Yakusho; Takayuki Yamada; Yusuke Iseya; Tsuyoshi Ihara; Hiroki Matsukata; Mikijirō Hira; Gorō Inagaki; Masachika Ichimura
- Cinematography: Nobuyasu Kita
- Edited by: Kenji Yamashita
- Music by: Kōji Endō
- Production companies: Sedic International; Recorded Picture Company
- Distributed by: Toho (Japan); Artificial Eye (United Kingdom)
- Release dates: 9 September 2010 (Venice Film Festival); 25 September 2010 (Japan)
- Running time: 141 minutes
- Countries: United Kingdom; Japan
- Language: Japanese
- Budget: $6 million
- Box office: $17.5 million

13 Assassins (Japanese: 十三人の刺客, Hepburn: Jūsannin no Shikaku) is a 2010 samurai film directed by Takashi Miike, and starring Koji Yakusho, Takayuki Yamada, Sōsuke Takaoka, Hiroki Matsukata, Kazuki Namioka and Gorō Inagaki. A remake of Eiichi Kudo's 1963 Japanese period drama film 13 Assassins, it is set in 1844 toward the end of the Edo period in which a group of thirteen assassins—comprising twelve samurai and a hunter—secretly plot to assassinate Lord Matsudaira Naritsugu, the murderous leader of the Akashi clan, to thwart his appointment to the powerful Shogunate Council.

The film marks the third collaboration in which Yamada and Takaoka co-starred, the first two being Crows Zero and Crows Zero 2, both directed by Miike. Principal photography took place over two months, from July to September 2009, in Tsuruoka, Yamagata, in northern Japan. The film opened in Japan on 25 September 2010 and in the United States on 29 April 2011. It received critical acclaim from western critics, who compared it favourably to Akira Kurosawa's oeuvre.

== Plot ==
In 1844, during the Edo Period, the Tokugawa Shogunate is in decline. Lord Matsudaira Naritsugu of Akashi sadistically rapes, tortures, mutilates and murders nobles and commoners, but is protected by the Shōgun, his half-brother. With Naritsugu due to ascend to the Shogunate Council, the Shōgun's Justice Minister, Sir Doi Toshitsura, realizes that this ascendance will cause civil war between the Shōgun and the many feudal lords Naritsugu has offended. The Mamiya clan's feudal lord publicly commits seppuku as a protest against the Shōgun's refusal to punish Naritsugu, who had personally murdered the feudal lord's entire family. When the Shōgun insists upon Naritsugu's promotion, Sir Doi hires a trusted older samurai, Shimada Shinzaemon, to assassinate Naritsugu. However, Naritsugu's loyal retainers led by Hanbei, an old contemporary of Shinzaemon, learn of the plot by spying on Doi.

Shinzaemon gathers ten more samurai, including his nephew, Shinrokurō, plus one rōnin, to attack Naritsugu during his official journey from Edo to Akashi. Before Naritsugu leaves, Hanbei confronts Shinzaemon over the plot. The assassins decide to ambush Naritsugu at the town of Ochiai, predicting that he will insist on carrying out his pre-announced visit of Naegi and thus pass through Ochiai. During the assassins' journey to Ochiai, they stop at a town where they are attacked by rōnin paid off by Hanbei. Fearing more attacks, the assassins leave the roads, instead trekking through the mountains, but lose their way. They rescue a hunter, Kiga Koyata, who guides them to Ochiai and volunteers to become the thirteenth assassin.

The assassins enlist the help of Makino, a feudal lord whose daughter-in-law was raped and son murdered by Naritsugu. Using troops with firearms, Makino blocks the official highway, forcing Naritsugu to take a detour. Makino then commits seppuku to conceal his involvement in the conspiracy. Sensing a trap, Hanbei advises Naritsugu to avoid Naegi, but Naritsugu refuses as this would publicly embarrass him. Naritsugu acknowledges that visiting Naegi is unsafe, but also exciting. Meanwhile, the assassins, with the legal authority and generous financial assistance of Doi, buy the help of Ochiai to convert the town into an elaborate maze of booby traps and camouflaged fortifications.

Naritsugu and his retinue arrive at Ochiai, with reinforcements arranged by Hanbei, increasing their number from 70 to 200. As Ochiai's civilians escape, the 13 assassins trap Naritsugu's party in Ochiai. A lengthy battle begins, with the assassins first using arrows and explosives, then using swords for melee combat, with the exception of Koyata, who fights with rocks in slings and with sticks. While many of Naritsugu's retainers are killed, Naritsugu is aroused by the bloodshed of the battle and declares that when he ascends to the Shogunate Council, he will start wars reminiscent of the Sengoku Period.

While most of the Akashi forces are defeated, at least 10 of the assassins perish, with several fighting until they collapsed dead from their injuries. Eventually, Shinzaemon and Shinrokurō confront Naritsugu, Hanbei and two remaining retainers. Shinzaemon argues that Naritsugu will ruin the realm, but Hanbei insists on loyalty to his master. Shinzaemon duels Hanbei and decapitates him after kicking mud into Hanbei's eyes, while Shinrokurō slays the last two Akashi retainers. Naritsugu kicks Hanbei's severed head away and announces that the people and the samurai have only one purpose: to serve their lords. Shinzaemon counters that the lords cannot live without the support of the people and that, if a lord abuses his power, the people will rise up against him. Naritsugu and Shinzaemon mortally wound each other. Crying, crawling in the mud, and experiencing rare fear and pain, Naritsugu thanks Shinzaemon for causing the most exciting day of Naritsugu's life. Shinzaemon decapitates Naritsugu before succumbing to his wounds.

Shinrokurō wanders through the carnage and Koyata runs up, appearing virtually unharmed despite being impaled through the neck by Naritsugu and slashed in the stomach by Hanbei. Koyata dismisses his previous injuries as trivial. Shinrokurō and Koyata leave separately, with Shinrokurō intending to become a bandit or travel to America, while Koyata vows to elope with his lover.

An epilogue states that Naritsugu's death was officially attributed to illness, and that 23 years later, the Tokugawa Shogunate was overthrown during the Meiji Restoration.

== Cast ==
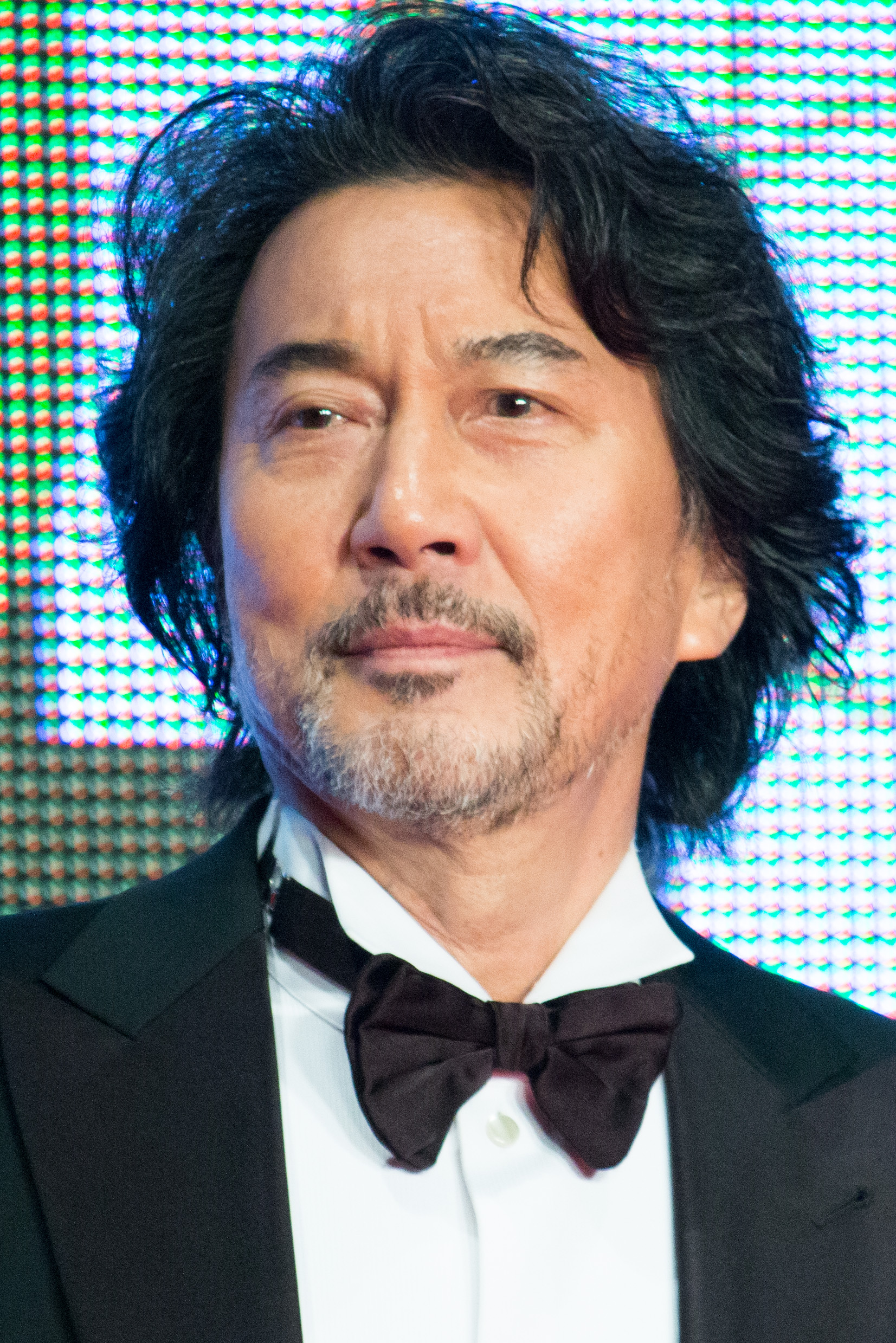
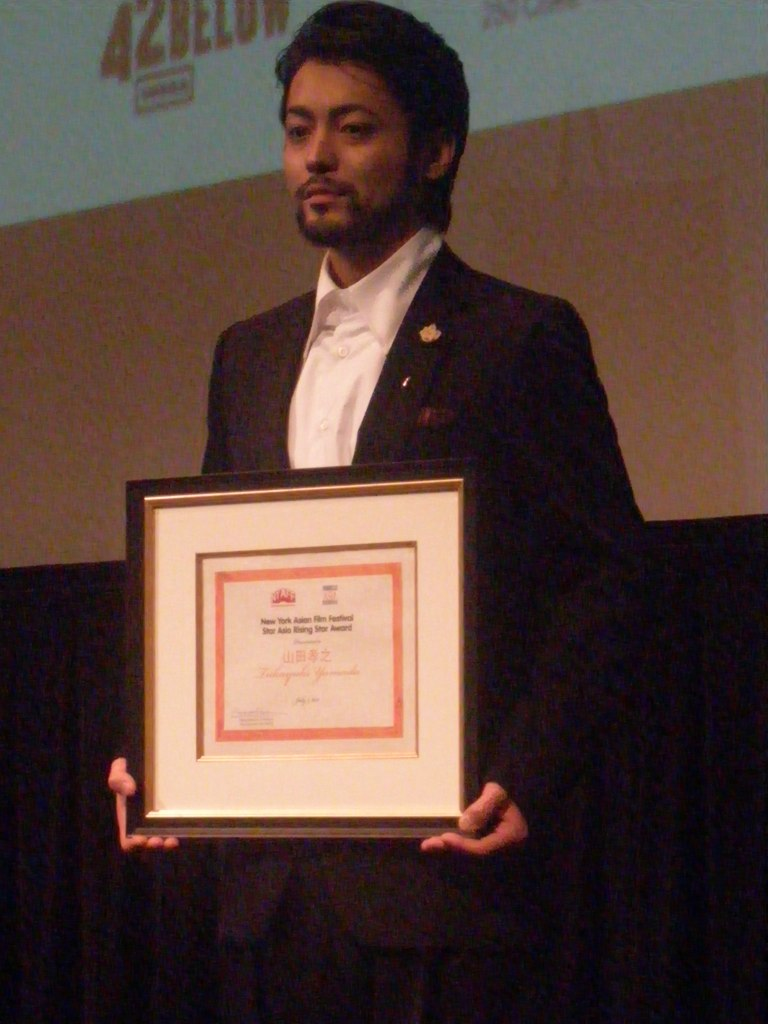
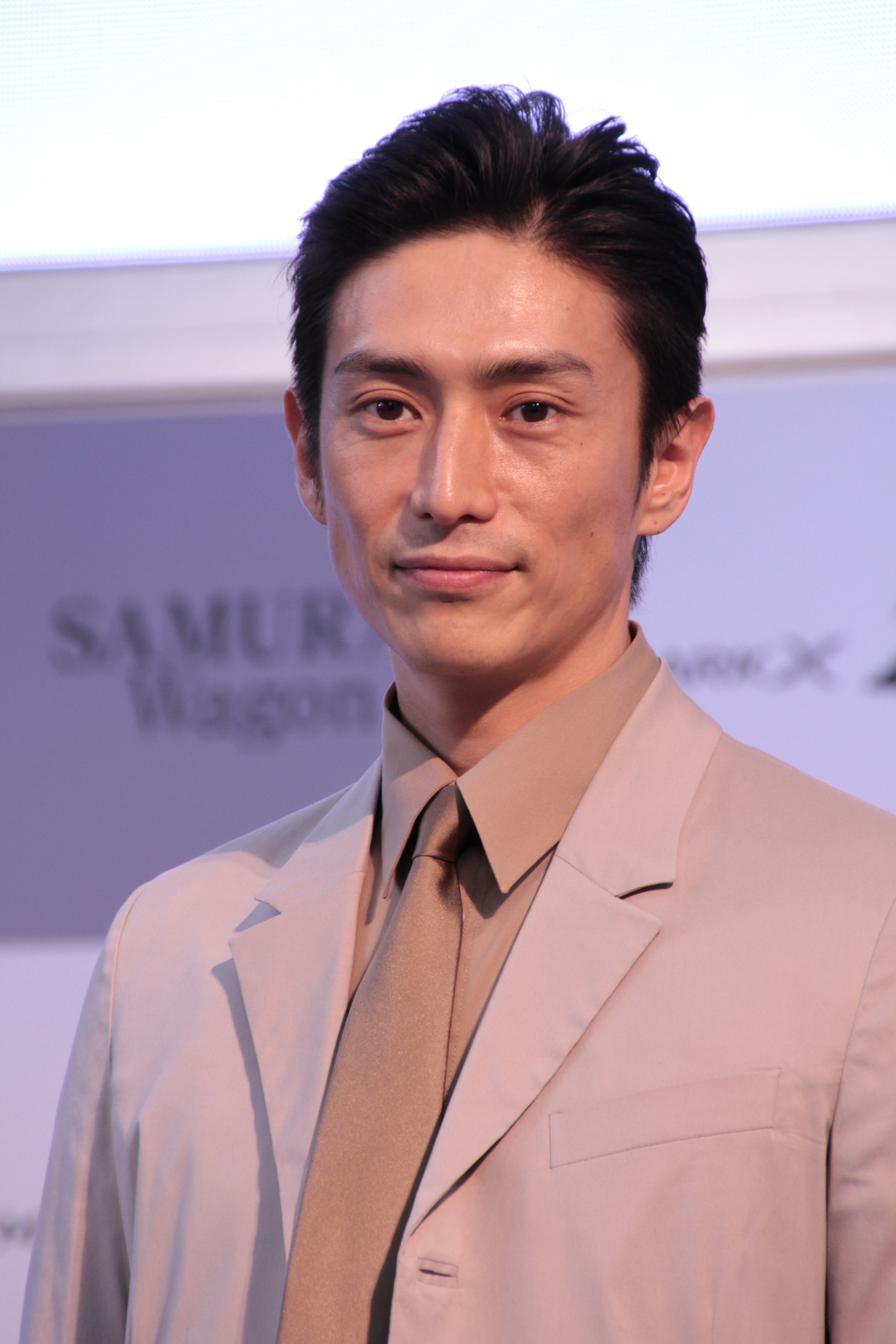
Top to bottom: Koji Yakusho, Takayuki Yamada and Yusuke Iseya
- Gorō Inagaki as Lord Matsudaira Naritsugu: The ruler of the Akashi Domain. His violent atrocities in his land have gone unpunished since he is protected by the Shōgun, who is his half-brother.
- Mikijirō Hira as Sir Doi Toshitsura: The senior advisor to the Shogunate Council. Alarmed that Naritsugu has been considered by the Shōgun for a political position on the council, he hires Shinzaemon to kill Naritsugu beforehand.
- Koji Yakusho as Shimada Shinzaemon: A war-weary, decorated samurai who believes that there is more to Bushido than blind obedience. Convinced that there was no chance for an honorable death, he is deeply elated when hired to carry out the mission. He assembles a group of eleven samurai to plot an ambush on Naritsugu's annual journey from Edo to his land in Akashi.
- Seiji Rokkaku as Otake Mosuke
- Hiroki Matsukata as Kuranaga Saheita: Second-in-command to Shinzaemon, another veteran samurai who volunteers his best and most trusted students for the mission
- Tsuyoshi Ihara as Hirayama Kujūrō: A masterless samurai of unmatched swordsmanship, who trained under Shinzaemon
- Takayuki Yamada as Shimada Shinrokurō: Shinzaemon's nephew, who has strayed from Bushido to become a gambler and a womanizer. Bored and ashamed, he joins the mission to redeem himself.
- Yusuke Iseya as Kiga Koyata: A hunter who is found suspended in a cage in the forest as a punishment for seducing his boss's wife and aids the assassins in finding a route to Ochiai. He is eventually recruited by Shinzaemon as the thirteenth assassin. Although not explicitly stated, it is heavily implied that he is a supernatural entity.

== Production ==
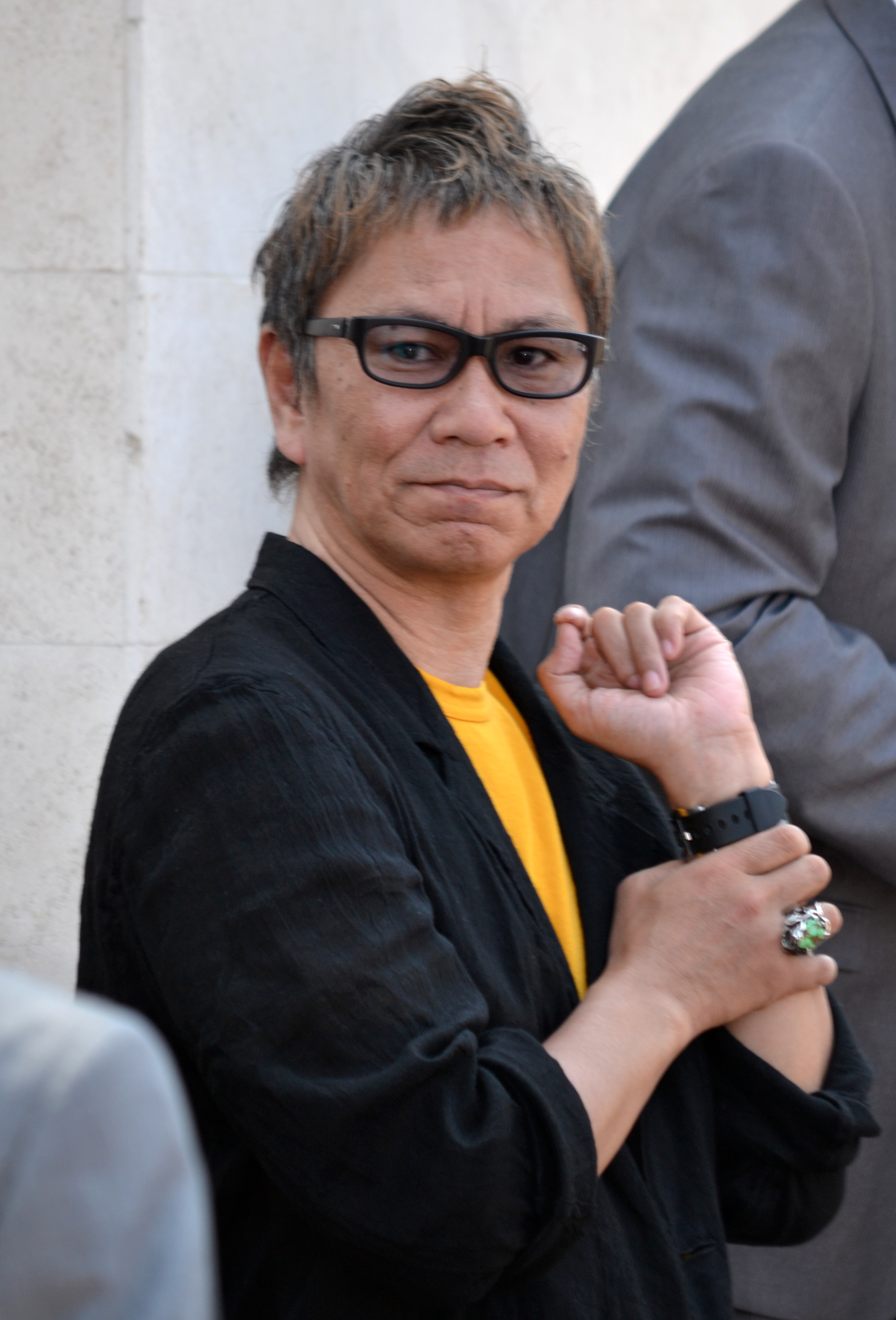
Director Takashi Miike

13 Assassins was produced through Toshiaki Nakazawa's film outfit, Sedic International, and Jeremy Thomas's Recorded Picture Company. Nakazawa had previously worked with director Takashi Miike on The Bird People in China and Andromedia (both in 1998), Yakuza Demon (2003), and Sukiyaki Western Django (2007). At the start of production, Thomas said he was pleased to be working again with "wonderful Japanese filmmakers like Toshiaki Nakazawa and Takashi Miike, whose work speaks for itself as being amongst the most successful and innovative coming from Japan". Nakazawa replied that he would like Thomas "to wear a sword also, and with one more assassin, together we will send out the fourteen assassins over there". Of his approach in directing the film, Miike said:

I felt that all of us working on our remake of 13 Assassins had to honour the original director, Eiichi Kudo, and everyone else who created the original. It was important to avoid doing what most modern-day chanbara do, which is to insert a love story, or interpose modern-day mindsets. Over the years, people have remade Kurosawa movies, but failed every time because they have not been able to adapt the story into something young audiences can understand.

Having been a fan of Koji Yakusho's acting, Miike made it a priority that he be cast in the leading role. In addition, he sought younger actors to play the assassins, in particular Sousuke Takaoka and Takayuki Yamada, with whom Miike had worked in his two films, Crows Zero (2007) and its sequel Crows Zero 2 (2009). The film's screenplay was written by Daisuke Tengan, who had also written the screenplay for Miike's film Audition (1999).

The film entered production over a two-month period. Principal photography began in July 2009 on a large open-air set in Tsuruoka in the Yamagata Prefecture in northern Japan. The filming of the action scenes took about three weeks and was met with minor weather-related difficulties. Miike had strayed from the use of CGI in the film as well as planning the scenes via storyboarding, insisting on shooting the scenes right away. In a separate interview, however, Miike said that some CGI were used, albeit minimal. Over half of the thirteen actors playing the assassins were reportedly inexperienced in sword fighting and horseback riding, and Miike wanted them to be just that, explaining, "If the actors had been skilled from the beginning, and had been in several samurai movies before, the way they approached the action would've been different; they probably would've ended up being something they were doing to look good or be beautiful, or to fall into the trappings of the stereotypical form that they had." Filming concluded in early September 2009.

== Release ==
For international exhibition, the 141 minute film was edited to 125 minutes.

=== Theatrical run ===
Jeremy Thomas's London-based company HanWay Films handled international sales. Toho had prebought the rights to distribute in Japan, and released it on 25 September 2010. The film competed for the Golden Lion at the 67th Venice International Film Festival on 9 September 2010.

Magnet Releasing, a genre arm of Magnolia Pictures, acquired North American distribution rights. The film streamed video on demand in March 2011, and was released theatrically in the United States on 29 April.

At the box office, 13 Assassins grossed $802,778 in the US and Canada. From an estimated $6 million budget, it grossed $17,555,141 worldwide.

=== Critical reception ===
13 Assassins drew favorable reviews from critics, many of whom praised its final battle sequence (which runs 45 minutes). Rotten Tomatoes gives a score of 95%, with an average rating of 7.9/10, based on reviews from 131 critics. The consensus reads, "Takashi Miike's electric remake of Eiichi Kudo's 1963 period action film is a wild spectacle executed with killer, dizzying panache." On Metacritic, the film received "Universal acclaim" and was awarded its "Must-See" badge, with a weighted average of 84 out of 100 based on 33 reviews.

Roger Ebert of the Chicago Sun-Times, who gave the film 3 1/2 stars out of 4, praised the film as "terrifically entertaining, an ambitious big-budget epic, directed with great visuals and sound", and compared it favorably with other action films in its subtle use of CGI effects. Ebert also praised the way the film "focuses on story in the midst of violence", as well as incorporating characters and drama with a skill that most blockbuster action films lack. Ebert later included it in his Best Films of 2011 list as an addendum to his top 20. Manohla Dargis chose 13 Assassins as her Critic's Pick for The New York Times, describing it as "A stirring, unexpectedly moving story of love and blood".

V. A. Musetto of the New York Post said the film complements Akira Kurosawa's Seven Samurai (1954) and Ran (1985), describing Miike's film as "a pulse-quickening masterpiece that would please the mighty Kurosawa". Mark Schilling of The Japan Times commended Miike's direction and the performance of the ensemble cast (including Koji Yakusho's). Schilling gave the film 4 stars out of 5, but, notwithstanding other favorable comparisons, he noted that it barely "strike[s] the deeper chords" of Seven Samurai. Tom Mes of Film Comment said the film "culminates in a riveting, ingeniously plotted, and inventively shot 45-minute battle scene that few contemporary Japanese directors besides Miike could pull off, either logistically or artistically". Leslie Felperin of Variety praised the film's technical aspects, describing Kenji Yamashita's editing as "gracefully executed", Kazuhiro Sawataishi's costume design as "terrific, character-defining", and Kōji Endō's soundtrack as "rousing, propulsive score".

=== Home media ===
The film's DVD and Blu-ray versions were released in the United States on 5 July 2011 by Magnet Releasing, and in the United Kingdom on 5 September by Artificial Eye. The DVD version was the 12th-bestselling DVD in its first week of availability in the US, selling 41,593 copies. In its second week, it dropped to 30th place, selling 13,922 copies. The Blu-ray version was the third-bestselling Blu-ray, selling 33,142 copies in its first week. In its second week, it dropped to 10,335 copies and was placed 20th. The Blu-ray version garnered positive reviews from IGN, DVD Talk, Slant Magazine, and HuffPost UK.

=== Accolades ===
In Japan, the film won four of its ten nominations at the 34th Japan Academy Prize, and won both of its two nominations at the 32nd Yokohama Film Festival. In 2014 Time Out polled several film critics, directors, actors, and stunt actors to list their top action films. 13 Assassins was listed at 94th place on the list. Rotten Tomatoes ranked the film at No. 70 on its list of the "140 Essential Action Movies To Watch Now", and was ranked at No. 5 on Screen Rant's "12 Best Action Movies You've Never Heard Of". 13 Assassins made the British Film Institute's list of 10 great samurai films.

Award	Date of ceremony	Category	Recipient(s) and nominee(s)	Result	Ref(s)
Asian Film Awards	21 March 2011	Best Production Design	Hayashida Yuji	Won	
Asian Film Awards	21 March 2011	Best Director	Takashi Miike	Nominated	
Asian Film Awards	21 March 2011	Best Actor	Koji Yakusho	Nominated	
Asian Film Awards	21 March 2011	Best Editor	Kenji Yamashita	Nominated	
Austin Film Critics Association Awards	28 December 2011	Top 10 Films	—	Ninth place	
Chlotrudis Society for Independent Films	21 March 2012	Best Director	Takashi Miike	Nominated	
Chlotrudis Society for Independent Films	21 March 2012	Best Cinematography	Nobuyasu Kita	Nominated	
Chlotrudis Society for Independent Films	21 March 2012	Best Production Design	Yûji Hayashida	Nominated	
Japan Academy Prize	18 February 2011	Outstanding Achievement in Cinematography	Nobuyasu Kita	Won	
Japan Academy Prize	18 February 2011	Outstanding Achievement in Lighting Direction	—	Won	
Japan Academy Prize	18 February 2011	Outstanding Achievement in Art Direction	Yûji Hayashida	Won	
Japan Academy Prize	18 February 2011	Outstanding Achievement in Sound Recording	Jun Nakamura	Won	
Japan Academy Prize	18 February 2011	Picture of the Year	—	Nominated	
Japan Academy Prize	18 February 2011	Director of the Year	Takashi Miike	Nominated	
Japan Academy Prize	18 February 2011	Screenplay of the Year	Daisuke Tengan	Nominated	
Japan Academy Prize	18 February 2011	Outstanding Performance by an Actor in a Leading Role	Koji Yakusho	Nominated	
Japan Academy Prize	18 February 2011	Outstanding Achievement in Music	Kōji Endō	Nominated	
Japan Academy Prize	18 February 2011	Outstanding Achievement in Film Editing	Kenji Yamashita	Nominated	
Online Film Critics Society	2 January 2012	Best Foreign Language Film	—	Nominated	
Satellite Awards	18 December 2011	Best Foreign Language Film	—	Nominated	
St. Louis Gateway Film Critics Association	12 December 2011	Best Foreign Language Film	—	Won	
Washington D.C. Area Film Critics Association	5 December 2011	Best Foreign Language Film	—	Nominated	
Yokohama Film Festival	6 February 2011	Best Film	—	Won	
Yokohama Film Festival	6 February 2011	Best Screenplay	Daisuke Tengan	Won	
