= Teppan =

Teppan may refer to:

- The metal griddle used in the teppanyaki style of Japanese cuisine
- Teppan (TV series), a Japanese television drama from 2010–2011
