= Crows (manga) =

Japanese manga series by Hiroshi Takahashi

- Cover of the first Crows volume

クローズ (Kurōzu)
- Genre: Yankī
- Manga
- Written by: Hiroshi Takahashi
- Published by: Akita Shoten
- Magazine: Monthly Shōnen Champion
- Original run: 1990 – 1998
- Volumes: 26
- Original video animation
- Directed by: Masamune Ochiai
- Produced by: Hiroshi Iwakawa; Noriko Nishino
- Music by: Keiichi Gotō
- Studio: Knack Productions
- Released: January 28, 1994 – June 24, 1994
- Runtime: 45 minutes per episode
- Episodes: 2
- Manga

Crows Gaiden: Katagiri Ken Monogatari
- Written by: Hiroshi Takahashi
- Published by: Akita Shoten
- Magazine: Monthly Shōnen Champion
- Original run: May 2, 2014 – October 6, 2014
- Volumes: 1
- Manga

Crows: Explode
- Written by: Hiroshi Takahashi (original story); Kōsuke Mukai; Rikiya Mizushima; Takashi Hasegawa
- Illustrated by: Tatsuya Kanda
- Published by: Akita Shoten
- Magazine: Monthly Shōnen Champion
- Original run: October 6, 2017 – October 6, 2020
- Volumes: 9
- Manga

Crows Gaiden: Housenka – The Beginning of Housen
- Written by: Hiroshi Takahashi
- Illustrated by: Shūhei Saitō
- Published by: Akita Shoten
- Magazine: Monthly Shōnen Champion
- Original run: November 6, 2017 – present
- Volumes: 7
- Related
- Worst; Crows Zero; Crows Zero 2; Crows Explode
- icon

Crows (Japanese: クローズ, Hepburn: Kurōzu) is a Japanese high school delinquent manga series by Hiroshi Takahashi. It has the same setting and also shares some characters with Takahashi's later manga QP and Worst.

== Plot ==
The story begins when Harumichi Bōya transfers into the second year at Suzuran High School. Suzuran is notorious for its delinquent students who are nicknamed 'Crows' because of their dark uniforms and inauspicious nature. Quickly enough Bōya meets a group centered around Hiromi Kirishima who are trying to challenge the school boss Hideto Bandō. From there the story follows the exploits of Suzuran students and the teen-aged delinquents of various surrounding schools and gangs.

== Characters ==
=== Suzuran ===
Harumichi Bōya (坊屋 春道)
Voiced by Hidenari Ugaki (OVA)
The main protagonist. His loyalty to his friends and cocky nature often get him into conflict but he is otherwise lazy and laid-back and rejects any leadership role.
Yasuo Yasuda (安田 泰男) / Yasu
Voiced by Kappei Yamaguchi (OVA)
Yasu is small and scrawny which makes him an easy target for bullies. He becomes Bōya's closest friend and right-hand man.
Futoshi Akutsu (亜久津 太) / Atchan
Voiced by Masashi Sugawara (OVA), played by Issei Okihara (live action)
Akutsu is bullying Yasu when he first crosses paths with Bōya who quickly teaches him a lesson. Despite being somewhat cowardly he becomes loyal in his own way to Bōya.
Hiromi Kirishima (桐島 ヒロミ)
Voiced by Toshiyuki Morikawa (OVA), played by Shunsuke Daito (live action)
Leader of the group that included Mako and Pon. After initially clashing with Bōya he allied with him to fight against Bandō. Also appears in the manga "QP".
Makoto Sugihara (杉原 誠) / Mako
Voiced by Jūrōta Kosugi (OVA), played by Yū Koyanagi (live action)
One of the strongest fighters at Suzuran. Managed to get a girlfriend much to Bōya's chagrin. Dropped out of school in his last year.
Toshiaki Honjō (本城 俊明) / Pon
Voiced by Kōji Tsujitani (OVA), played by Ryō Hashizume (live action)
A hotheaded boy usually wearing a face mask after breaking his two front teeth in a bike accident.
Hideto Bandō (阪東 秀人)
Voiced by Kazuki Yao (OVA), played by Dai Watanabe (live action)
The ruthless boss of Suzuran when Bōya arrived and a member of the gang The Front of Armament. Also appears in the manga "QP".
Megumi Hayashida (林田 恵) / Rindaman
Voiced by Akio Ōtsuka (OVA), played by Motoki Fukami (live action)
Third year student and a surly loner who was the only one at Suzuran who could stand up to Bōya in a fight. He has however no interest in gang politics. He is modelled after the character "Ricky Linderman" from the 1980 film My Bodyguard.
Saburō Hanazawa (花澤 三郎) / Zetton
A former middle school junior of Bōya who entered Suzuran as a freshman when Bōya was beginning his third year. His nickname comes from a Kaiju in the Ultraman television series.

=== Kurotaki Alliance ===
Osamu Furukawa (古川 修) / Bulldog
Boss of Takiya Commerce High School and president of The Kurotaki Alliance. A charismatic leader who bonds with Bōya over their common inability to get anywhere with girls.
Kenichi Maruyama (丸山 賢一) / Maruken
Played by Joey Iwanaga (Crows Explode live action)
Kenichi Kadozumi (角住 賢一) / Kakuken
Played by Shuhei Nogae (Crows Explode live action)
Maruken and Kakuken are the bosses of Kurosaki Industrial. Though they often argue about trivial things they are such close friends that they are sometimes collectively known as 'MaruKaku'. They are the first to join Bulldog and form The Kurotaki Alliance.
Shinsuke Nakajima (中島 信助) / Ammo
A freshman at Kawada 2nd High who managed to become the new boss by defeating the previous boss Ishikawa. He is the only freshman to become an officer in The Kurotaki Alliance.

=== Hōsen ===
Tatsuya Bitō (美藤 竜也)
Played by Haruma Miura (live action)
Ruled Hōsen Academy, Suzuran's rival school, along with his younger brother Hideyuki. They seek revenge for the death of their older brother. Later the brothers move to Tokyo.
Jō Kanayama (金山 丈) / King Joe
A freshman who took control of Hōsen after the Bitōs left. Always ambitious and picking fights with the bosses of other schools. His nickname is the name of a robot in the Ultra Seven television series.

=== Others ===
Ryūshin Kunō (九能 龍信)
Became the leader of The Front of Armament motorcycle gang after his brother Hideomi is defeated. Unlike his brother, Ryūshin is tough and honorable. Later moves to Tokyo to become a professional boxer.
Genjirō Katsuragi (桂木 源次郎)
Voiced by Masahiro Anzai (OVA)
A graduate of Suzuran and a construction worker. Many Suzuran students see him as a big brother figure, in particular Rindaman.

== Media ==
=== Manga ===
Takahashi wrote a one volume side story called Crows Gaiden: Katagiri Ken Monogatari which was published in 2014. A tribute manga called Crows Respect written by various authors was published by Akita Shoten in 2018. Two manga spin-offs were released in 2017 in Monthly Shōnen Champion. The first titled Crows: Explode, written by Kōsuke Mukai, Rikiya Mizushima and Takashi Hasegawa and illustrated by Tatsuya Kanda, began on October 6; it finished on October 6, 2020. The second, Crows Gaiden: Housenka – The Beginning of Housen by Shūhei Saitō, about the beginning of Hōsen Academy, started on November 6.

=== Films ===
The manga inspired three live-action films: Crows Zero in 2007, Crows Zero 2 in 2009 (both directed by Takashi Miike), and Crows Explode (directed by Toshiaki Toyoda) in 2014. The films are not direct adaptations but take place before the events of the manga. Several characters from the manga appear in the movies but not the main character Bōya.

=== OVAs ===
The series was adapted into a two episode OVA by Knack Productions in 1994, which covered the first three volumes of the manga. The ending theme for episode 1 is "Totsuzen, Natsu no Arashi no Youni" by THE STREET BEATS and the ending theme for episode 2 is "Outsider" by THE STREET BEATS.

No.	Title	Original release date
1	"Crows"; Transliteration: "Kurouzu" (Japanese: クローズ)	January 28, 1994
2	"High-School Fighting Legend Crows 2"; Transliteration: "Koukou Butouden Kurouzu 2" (Japanese: 高校武闘伝 クローズ 2)	June 24, 1994

=== Video games ===
==== Saturn ====
A beat-em-up game for the Sega Saturn titled Crows: The Battle Action was released in 1997, which was developed and published by Athena.

==== Playstation 4 ====
An action-adventure video game by Bandai Namco Games for PlayStation 4 titled Crows: Burning Edge was released on October 27, 2016. Plans to publish the PlayStation Vita version were cancelled due to "various circumstances". It was previously announced in July 2015 to coincide with the manga's 25th anniversary.

While the game centers on the adventures of Harumichi Bōya, the story of Another Crow deals with another teenage delinquent named Masamune Akagi with his story taking place at the same time with Bōya's own events. Another original character next to Akagi is Naoun Kyohei. The story was written by Takahashi.

It sold 9,574 units in its first week of release.
