= Takayuki Yamada =

Japanese actor, singer, and producer (born 1983)

- 山田 孝之
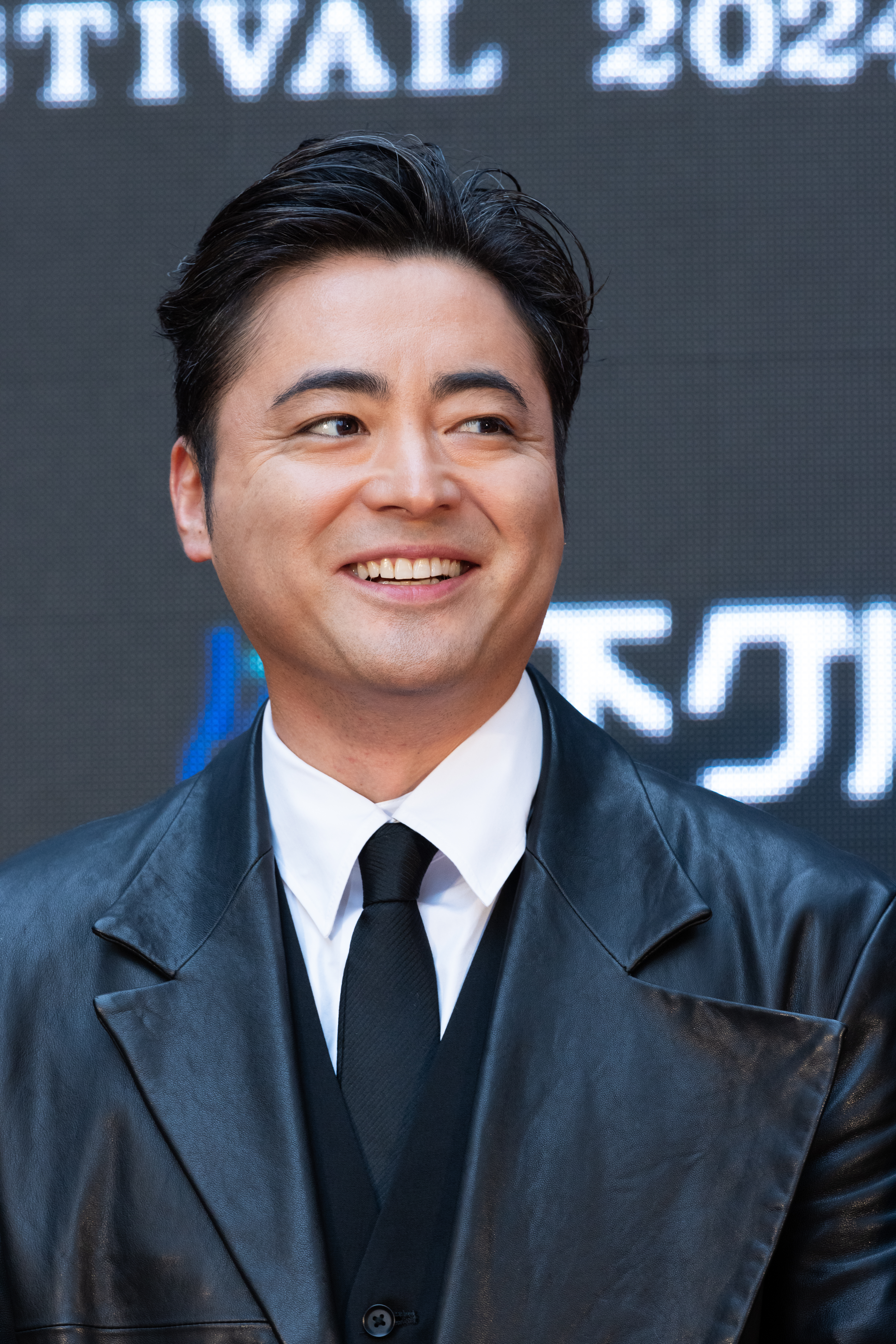
- Yamada attending the 37th Tokyo International Film Festival in 2024
- Born: October 20, 1983 (age 42); Naha, Okinawa, Japan
- Occupations: Actor; singer; producer
- Years active: 1998–present
- Agent: Stardust Promotion
- Children: 2

Takayuki Yamada (山田 孝之, Yamada Takayuki; born October 20, 1983) is a Japanese actor, singer, and producer. He is best known for his role as Sakutaro Matsumoto in TV drama Socrates in Love and as Densha Otoko in the 2005 film of the same name. Yamada gained international popularity through his portrayal as Tamao Serizawa in Crows Zero film series. Japanese media often dubs him as chameleon actor for his wide acting spectrum throughout his career. He began venturing as producer with live-action web series Saint Young Men. In 2018, he became the lead singer of band The XXXXXX.

== Personal life ==
Yamada was born in Naha, Okinawa, but raised in Satsumasendai, Kagoshima until the age of 15. He is the youngest of three siblings. His two older sisters, Kaori and Sayuki, worked as models for teen magazines in late 1990s. His parents own a coffee shop.

In 2004, Yamada had been dating actress and model Chiho Oyama. From their relationship, a child was born. This was discovered and reported by Sponichi in 2006. Yamada, Oyama and her family had many discussions about his inability to continue in the entertainment world and be a father at the same time, so they agreed that the child would be raised by the mother, with Yamada paying child support and living expenses until the child reached adulthood. Oyama continued writing on her blog about her love of being a mother to her child (a boy), even if it had to be done as a single mother.

Yamada was seen dating a non-celebrity woman around 2010. 2 years later, news of his marriage to a non-celebrity woman 7 years his senior was reported as happening 1 January 2012. On 20 October of the same year, the news of a pregnancy was reported. In early March 2013, his office reported that their son was born. A photo of Yamada wearing a wedding ring, which he posted in his Instagram on 9 December, 2016, was like a confirmation to fans that he was married.

== Career ==
=== Early career ===
Yamada got scouted after shopping with his sisters in front of Laforet Harajuku. After being scouted, in his third year of middle school he moved from Kagoshima to Tokyo. Yamada graduated from a middle school in Tokyo but did not go to high school to focus on his acting career.

=== Acting career ===
He made his debut in 1999 by starring in TV drama Psychometrer Eiji 2. He also had a significant role in the NHK Asadora: Churasan (ちゅらさん) in 2001. His breakout was the 2003 TV drama about men synchronized swimming Water Boys, taking the lead role as Kankuro Shindo. He was chosen to portray Shindo through audition among hundreds of young actors. Yamada continued his success in leading role with Socrates in Love as Sakutaro Matsumoto the year after. In the same year, he got Newcomer Award at 2004 Elan d'or Awards and was appointed as first image character of newly reformed Tokyo Metro. As of 2017, Yamada was the only male image character Tokyo Metro has ever had. After his triumphant breakout on television, he got his first movie lead role in Densha Otoko which later became Japan's 14th best selling movie of 2005.

=== Music career ===
In 2002 he released 真夏の天使~All I want for this Summer is you~ a CD with a couple of songs (with the backup versions), as well as a DVD with the musical video for the theme song.

He collaborated with Jin Akanishi in August 2016 to form the unit called "Jintaka", which disbanded 2 months later. And in 2018, together with Gō Ayano (guitar), and Asahi Uchida (synthesizer), forms the unit "The xxxxxx" (read as: "The Six") (Yamada is vocals).

=== Producer ===
Yamada appears on a YouTube video titled "The Open Call -Main Partner Takayuki Yamada- Episode 0". "The Open Call" is an audition project for an original movie scheduled to be filmed in 2027 and screened in 2028. The project differs from a normal audition in that in this one, the ideal candidate is chosen for a particular role, while the project is based in the candidates actions and interactions. The acting, the words spoken, and the stories the candidates have carried with them during the judging, all of it will become part of the script of the movie. The process is being streamed on the NTT Docomo "Lemino" site. On the official page, Yamada is identified as producer. Guest judges (or partners, as mentioned on–site) include Tsuyoshi Muro, Akari Takaishi and Kazunari Ninomiya.

== Other ==
=== Social network ===
It was reported that Yamada had closed down his Instagram (@takayukiyamadaphoto), much to the surprise of the fans. On his Twitter, he confirmed the reason for doing so is that he became overwhelmed with the quantity of followers, but that he is "fine and full of energy, that it seems about to burst both physically and mentally".

== Filmography ==
=== Series ===
Year	Title	Role	Notes	Ref.
1999	Psychometrer Eiji 2	Takayuki	Debut role	
2000	Rokubanme no Sayoko	Shu Sekine		
2000	Aoi Tokugawa Sandai	Takechiyo	Taiga drama	
2001	Churasan	Keitatsu Kohagura	Asadora	
2001	Jidan Kosho Jinnai Tamako Ura File			
2001	Koi ga Shitai x3	Wataru Aoshima		
2002	The Long Love Letter	Sho Takamatsu		
2002	Jidan Kosho Jinnai Tamako Ura File 2			
2002	Akahige			
2002	Onmyoji Abe no Seimei	Toya		
2002	The Queen of Lunchtime Cuisine	Minoru Ushijima		
2003	Hatachi	Ryuji Shindo	Lead role	
2003	Water Boys	Kankuro Shindo		
2004	Socrates in Love	Sakutaro Matsumoto	Lead role	
2004	Fire Boys	Daigo Asahina	Lead role	
2004	Jidan Kosho Jinnai Tamako Ura File 3			
2005	H2	Hiro Kunimi	Lead role	
2005	Densha Otoko		cameo; ep. 1	
2005	Start Line	Jun Imai	TV movie	
2006	Journey Under the Midnight Sun	Ryoji Kirihara	Lead role	
2006	Taiyou no Uta	Kouji Fujishiro	Lead role	
2009	Boss	Shingo Tajima		
2010–16	Ushijima the Loan Shark	Kaoru Ushijima	Lead role; 3 seasons	
2010	Wagaya no Rekishi	Tatsuya Nakadai	Mini-series	
2011	Arakawa Under the Bridge	Hoshi		
2011–16	The Brave Yoshihiko	Yoshihiko	Lead role; 3 seasons	
2014	Nobunaga Concerto	Denjiro/ Hideyoshi Hashiba		
2015	Replay and Destroy	Kaname Yokoyama	Lead role	
2017	Hagoku	Seitaro Sakuma	TV movie	
2018	Dele	Keishi Sakagami	Lead role	
2018	Yareta Kamo Iinkai	Oasis		
2019–21	The Naked Director	Toru Muranishi	Lead role; 2 seasons	
2023	What Will You Do, Ieyasu?	Hattori Hanzō	Taiga drama	
2023	Yomawari Neko	Heizō Endō	Lead role	
2024	House of Ninjas	Yosuke Tsujioke		
2024	Tanabata no Kuni	Yoriyuki Marukami		
2024	Tokyo Swindlers	Narrator		
2025	Quiztopia	K-ichi K-i	Lead role	
2025	Last Samurai Standing	Ando Jinbei		
2025	Glass Heart	Reji		

=== Film ===
Year	Title	Role	Notes	Ref.
2002	The Cat Returns	Lune (voice)		
2003	Dragon Head	Nobuo Takahashi		
2004	Jennifer	Takashi	Lead role	
2005	Densha Otoko	Densha Otoko	Lead role	
2006	The Letters (Tegami)	Naotaka Takeshima	Lead role	
2007	Crows Zero	Tamao Serizawa		
2007	Say Hello For Me	Satoshi Toyama	Lead role	
2007	Maiko Haaaan!!!		Cameo	
2008	Ikigami	Satoshi Izuka		
2008	252: Signal of Life	Makoto Shigemura		
2009	Battle League Horumo	Akira Abe	Lead role	
2009	MW	Yutaro Garai	Lead role	
2009	Crows Zero 2	Tamao Serizawa		
2009	Chasing My Girl	Sugimoto	Lead role	
2010	Seaside Motel	Yosuke Asakura		
2010	13 Assassins	Shinrokuro Shimada		
2010	Vengeance Can Wait	Takao Banue		
2011	Gantz	Masamitsu Shigeta		
2011	Oba: The Last Samurai	Toshio Kitami		
2011	Gantz: Perfect Answer	Masamitsu Shigeta		
2011	Unfair 2: The Answer	Katsuaki Murakami		
2011	Looking for a True Fiancee	Teruhiko Katayama	Lead role	
2012	Arakawa Under the Bridge	Hoshi		
2012	The Floating Castle	Yoshitsugu Otani		
2012	The Samurai That Night	Hiroshi Kijima		
2012	Bungo: Stories of Desire	Matsuo	segment Nigitta Te	
2012	Ushijima the Loan Shark	Kaoru Ushijima	Lead role	
2012	Lesson of the Evil	Tetsuro Shibahara		
2012	Milocrorze – A Love Story	Ovreneli Vreneligare/ Besson Kumagai/ Tamon	Lead role	
2013	I'll Give It My All... Tomorrow	Shuichi Ichinosawa		
2013	The Devil's Path	Shuichi Fujii	Lead role	
2013	Rakugo Eiga	Raifu Reto		
2014	Ushijima the Loan Shark Part 2	Kaoru Ushijima	Lead role	
2014	The Mole Song: Undercover Agent Reiji	Shun Tsukihara		
2014	Monsterz	Shuichi Tanaka		
2015	Bakuman	Akira Hattori		
2015	Shinjuku Swan	Hideyoshi Minami		
2016	Nobunaga Concerto	Hideyoshi Hashiba		
2016	Terra Formars	Ichiro Hiruma		
2016	Ushijima the Loan Shark Part 3	Kaoru Ushijima	Lead role	
2016	Someone	Sawa		
2016	Ushijima the Loan Shark The Final	Kaoru Ushijima	Lead role	
2017	Gintama	Elizabeth (voice)		
2017	Cinema Fighters	Toru	segment Parallel World	
2017	Takayuki Yamada 3D The Movie	Himself	Lead role	
2017	JoJo's Bizarre Adventure: Diamond Is Unbreakable Chapter I	Angelo Katagiri		
2017	DC Super Heroes vs. Eagle Talon	Batman/Bruce Wayne (voice)		
2018	Ten	Takashi	short movie	
2018	50 First Kisses	Daisuke Yuge	Lead role	
2018	Hardcore	Ukon Gondō	Lead role; also producer	
2019	Dragon Quest: Your Story	Papasu (voice)		
2020	Step	Ken'ichi	Lead role	
2020	The Untold Tale of the Three Kingdoms	Yellow Turban		
2021	Brothers in Brothel	Tokuta	Lead role	
2023	Six Singing Women	Uwajima	Lead role	
2023	The Imaginary	Jinzan (voice)		
2024	11 Rebels	Masa	Lead role	
2024	Faceless	Seigo Matanuki		
2024	Saint Young Men: The Movie	TBA	Also producer	
2025	Blazing Fists	Man in bear suit	Uncredited cameo	
2025	Detective Conan: One-Eyed Flashback	Takashi Omoto (voice)		
2025	New Interpretation of the End of Edo Period	Katsura Kogorō		
2025	Good News	Shinichi Ishida	Korean film	
2026	Shin Gekijōban Keroro Gunsō: Fukkatsu Shite Sokkō Chikyū Metsubō no Kiki de Arimasu!	Yoshihiko (voice)		

=== Anime ===
Year	Title	Role	Notes	Ref.
2024	Babies of Bread	Croissant Baby	ONA	

=== Japanese dub ===
Year	Title	Role	Notes	Ref.
2006	Eragon	Eragon		
2017	Loving Vincent	Armand Roulin		

=== Video games ===
Year	Title	Role	Notes	Ref.
2016	Dragon Quest Heroes II	Cesare		

=== Others ===
Year	Title	Notes	Ref.
2018–20	Saint Young Men	Executive producer	
2019	Day and Night	Producer, screenwriter	

=== Commercials ===
Year	Title	Notes	Ref.
2002	Coca-Cola "No Reason" campaign	celebrating 2002 World Cup	
2003	Japanese Red Cross Society "20-year-old's blood donation" campaign		
2004	Toyo Suisan "Maruchan Yakisoba, Yakiudon"		
2004	Tokyo Metro	First campaign image character	
2005	Tokyo Electric Power Company "TEPCO Hikari"		
2010–2011	Movaslo "Evangelion ~Shinjitsu no Tsubasa~"		
2011	Asahi Food and Healthcare "Cream Genmai Bran"		
2011	Fields "We are all challengers" campaign		
2014–2023	The Coca-Cola Company Japan "Georgia"	main image character	
2014–2023	Storia "MARO"	main image character	
2015 –	Sony Interactive Entertainment "PlayStation 4"	main image character	
2016	Frima "Fril"	flea marketplace application	
2017 –	Fujitsu "Arrows"	with Shun Oguri	

== Discography ==
Year	Title	Release	Label	Peak chart position	Notes
2002	真夏の天使~All I want for this Summer is you~	August 10, 2002	Universal Music Group		Sold in CD, and DVD of the Music video
2016	Choo Choo SHITAIN	September 21, 2016	Go Good Records	4th (October 3, 2016)	CD, CD + DVD / As "Jintaka"
2018	Seeds (single)	November 30, 2018	THE XXXXXX		Digital release / As "The xxxxxx"
2018	Zealot (single)	December 21, 2018	THE XXXXXX		Digital release / As "The xxxxxx"
2019	"THE XXXXXX" (album)	April 5, 2019	THE XXXXXX		Digital release / As "The xxxxxx"
2019	"deep breath" (single)	May 31, 2019	THE XXXXXX		Digital release / As "The xxxxxx"

== Other Musical Collaborations ==
- Directed music video for "Tee"'s song 恋のはじまり, and makes a cameo appearance in it (May 31, 2016).
- カンヌの休日 feat. 山田孝之 (Cannes no Kyuujitsu feat. Yamada Takayuki), Fujifabric's single (February 2, 2017)

== Awards and nominations ==
=== Awards ===
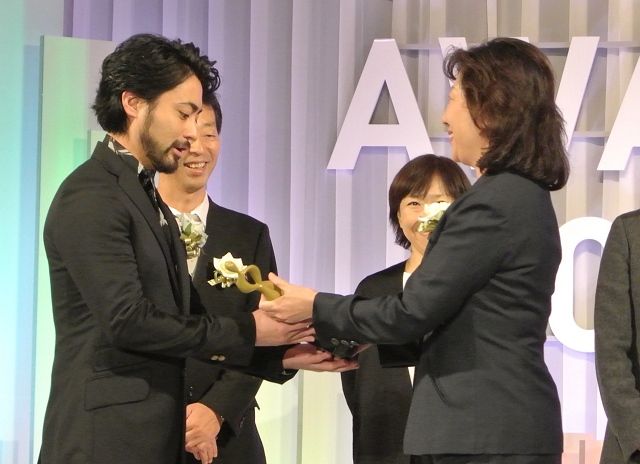
Yamada receiving an award at the International Drama Festival in Tokyo 2017.

- 2004: 28th Elan d'or Awards – Newcomer of the Year
- 2011: New York Asian Film Festival – Star Asia Rising Star Award
