= Kazuki Namioka =

Japanese actor (born 1978)

- Born: August 2, 1978 (age 47); Osaka, Osaka Prefecture, Japan
- Occupation: Actor
- Years active: 2004–present

Kazuki Namioka (波岡 一喜, Namioka Kazuki; born August 2, 1978) is a Japanese actor. He made his acting debut in the television series Pride. He appeared in Hiroshi Shinagawa's 2009 debut film Drop. He also co-starred with Kōji Yakusho in Takashi Miike's 13 Assassins.

== Filmography ==
=== Films ===
- Break Through! (2005)
- Densha Otoko (2005)
- The Fast and the Furious: Tokyo Drift (2006)
- Waiting in the Dark (2006)
- Midnight Eagle (2007)
- Hero (2007)
- Crows Zero (2007)
- Tokyo Sonata (2008)
- Chameleon (2008)
- L: Change the World (2008)
- Fish Story (2009)
- Yellow Kid (2009)
- Crows Zero 2 (2009)
- Drop (2009)
- 13 Assassins (2010)
- Golden Slumber (2010)
- Space Battleship Yamato (2010)
- Helldriver (2010)
- Zebraman 2: Attack on Zebra City (2010)
- Parade (2010)
- The Detective Is in the Bar (2011)
- Shodo Girls: Blue Blue Sky [Aoi Aoi Sora] (2011) - Kazuki Yatsushiro
- Gaku: Minna no Yama (2011)
- Ninja Kids!!! (2011)
- Hara-Kiri: Death of a Samurai (2011)
- Ace Attorney (2012)
- Stand Up! Vanguard (2012)
- Library Wars (2013)
- The Great Passage (2013)
- Why Don't You Play in Hell? (2013)
- 7 Days Report (2014)
- Danger Dolls (2014)
- Okāsan no Ki (2015)
- Namae (2018)
- Lady in White (2018)
- Hell Girl (2019)
- Iwane: Sword of Serenity (2019)
- Gozen (2019)
- Janitor (2021)
- In the Wake (2021) - Suzuki
- Nishinari Goro's 400 Million Yen (2021)
- Noise (2022)
- Phases of the Moon (2022)
- Bad City (2023) - Murata
- Daisuke Jigen (2023)
- There Was Such a Thing Before (2025)
- Kyojo: Requiem (2026)
- Wait Offshore (2026)

=== Television ===
- Pride (2004)
- Genseishin Justirisers (2004-2005)
- Densha Otoko (2005)
- Lion-Maru G (2006)
- Kamen Rider Den-O (2007)
- Heaven's Flower The Legend of Arcana (2011)
- Ghost Writer's Homicide Coverage (2012–15)
- Kamen Rider Gaim (2013)
- Hibana (2016)
- Miotsukushi Ryōrichō (2017)
- Kuroshoin no Rokubei (2018), Ōmura Masujirō
- Mob Psycho 100 Live Action (2018)
- The Yagyu Conspiracy (2020), Karasuma Ayamaro
- Reach Beyond the Blue Sky (2021), Kawamura Ejūrō
- What Will You Do, Ieyasu? (2023), Honda Tadazane
- Chihayafuru: Full Circle (2025), Tsuyoshi Shima
