= Crows Zero =

- Directed by: Takashi Miike
- Screenplay by: Shōgo Mutō
- Based on: Crows by Hiroshi Takahashi
- Produced by: Mataichiro Yamamoto
- Starring: Shun Oguri; Kyosuke Yabe; Takayuki Yamada; Shunsuke Daito; Meisa Kuroki; Tsutomu Takahashi; Goro Kishitani
- Cinematography: Takumi Furuya
- Edited by: Shuichi Kakesu; Tomoki Nagasaka
- Music by: Naoki Otsubo; The Street Beats
- Production company: Tristone Entertainment
- Distributed by: Toho
- Release date: October 27, 2007 (Japan)
- Running time: 129 minutes
- Country: Japan
- Language: Japanese
- Box office: $22,036,607

Crows Zero (クローズZERO, Kurōzu Zero), also known as Crows: Episode 0, is a 2007 Japanese action film directed by Takashi Miike with a screenplay by Shōgo Mutō. It is based on the manga Crows by Hiroshi Takahashi and stars Shun Oguri, Kyōsuke Yabe, Meisa Kuroki and Takayuki Yamada. The plot serves as a prequel to the manga and focuses on the power struggle between gang of students at Suzuran All-Boys High School.

Crows Zero was released in Japan on 27 October 2007 and became a commercial success. It has spawned two sequels titled Crows Zero 2 and Crows Explode as well as a manga adaptation released 13 November 2008.

== Plot ==
Genji Takiya is a newly transferred high school senior who arrives at Suzuran All-Boys High School, which is infamous for its population of violent delinquents. During the freshman orientation assembly, the yakuza arrive at the school seeking vengeance on third-year Serizawa Tamao for assaulting some members of their gang. The thugs mistake Genji for their target and a brawl ensues on the school field.

Meanwhile, Serizawa is visiting his best friend Tatsukawa Tokio, who has just been discharged from a hospital. Upon returning to the school, Serizawa witnesses Genji defeat the last of the yakuza. That night, Genji goes to his frequented nightclub and meets R&B singer Aizawa Ruka. Genji goes to see his father Takiya Hideo, who is the yakuza boss. Genji proclaims his ambition to conquer Suzuran, a feat which Hideo himself had unsuccessfully attempted in his youth. Genji makes Hideo promise to acknowledge him as his successor should he succeed. The next day, Genji challenges Serizawa to a fight, but is halted by Tokio. Tokio tells Genji that if he really wants to make an impression then he should begin by defeating Rindaman, a legendary fighter at the school.

After Rindaman refuses his challenge, Genji encounters Katagiri Ken, one of the yakuza who previously arrived at the school. Ken attacks Genji in retaliation for getting his gang arrested, but is taken down with a single punch. Humbled, Ken goes with Genji to the club where they discuss the latter's plans for Suzuran. Following advice from Ken, Genji begins building his army called Genji Perfect Seiha (GPS). Anticipating the brewing conflict, Serizawa also begins recruiting factions for his own cause. Genji succeeds in rallying several strong members, including Tamura Chūta, Makise Takashi and Izaki Shun. Serizawa is alarmed by Genji's rapid rise to power, but chooses not to take action. One of Serizawa's lieutenants Tokaji Yūji is not so ambivalent and begins covertly attacking members of the GPS, severely beating Chūta and putting Izaki in the hospital.

The provocations cause tensions between the two armies to rise drastically, but Genji is prevented from acting by Makise. One night, Tokio and Serizawa visit the nightclub and encounter Genji. When Tokio runs interference between the opposing leaders, he suffers a seizure and is rushed to a hospital. Tokio learns that he has a cerebral aneurysm which requires surgery. Despite initial hesitation about the procedure's 30% success rate, Tokio agrees to the operation. Tokaji approaches Bandō Hideto, who is leader of "The Front of Armament" biker gang, with a plan to kidnap Ruka and further aggravate Genji. Elsewhere, the yakuza boss Yazaki Jōji orders Ken to kill Genji, disregarding the fact that doing so will incite a war between the yakuza organizations.

The task proves to be hard for Ken, who has grown fond of Genji and begins lamenting his decision to become a yakuza. Ken decides to inform Takiya Hideo of the plot to kill his son. Genji gets a call from Ruka, who tells him that she is being held hostage by men with skulls on their jackets, and that her captors mentioned the name "Bandō". Surmising that her captors are The Armament, Genji gathers the GPS and proceeds to the biker gang's headquarters. A fight ensues, but Genji soon realizes that the men they are fighting are missing their trademark skull patches. Bandō demands an end to fight, revealing that he had ordered the skulls to be removed after part of The Armament aligned with Tokaji. After locating Tokaji and saving Ruka, Genji decides it is finally time for war against Serizawa.

They decide to fight at 5:00 pm the following day at the same time that Tokio will undergo his operation, with Serizawa believing it will allow him to fight alongside Tokio. The next day as the battle begins, the tide seems to be in Serizawa's favor, but after Bandō's faction of The Armament arrives and joins the GPS, the odds are evened out. The fighting continues until only Serizawa and Genji are left standing. Meanwhile, Ken is taken to the harbor to be executed for disobeying the order to kill Genji. Yazaki gives Ken his coat as a parting gift before shooting him in the back. He falls into the water and begins to sink. Genji and Serizawa fight well into the night. Though injured and exhausted, Genji eventually gains the upper hand and triumphs. Clinging to consciousness, Serizawa receives a call from the hospital informing him that Tokio's operation was a success.

Back at the docks, Ken suddenly recovers and swims to the surface. He discovers that the coat Yazaki had given to him was bulletproof, and that his "execution" was a ploy to allow him to leave the organization and live a different life. Several days later, Genji again challenges Rindaman, who is the final obstacle on his path to ruling Suzuran. Rindaman expresses his belief that Suzuran can never be truly conquered and that there will always be someone left to fight.

== Characters ==
=== Genji Perfect Seiha (GPS) ===
- Genji Takiya
- Takashi Makise
- Chuta Tamura
- Izaki Shun

=== Serizawa Army ===
- Serizawa Tamao
- Tatsukawa Tokio
- Tokaji Yūji
- Tsutsumoto Shoji
- The Mikami Brothers

=== The Front of Armament (Second Year, Biker Gang) ===
- Bandō Hideto

=== Ebizuka Junior High Trio (First Year) ===
- Kirishima Hiromi
- Honjō Toshiaki
- Sugihara Makoto

=== Unaffliliated ===
- Hayashida "Rindaman" Megumi

== Cast ==
- Shun Oguri as Genji Takiya
- Takayuki Yamada as Serizawa Tamao
- Sansei Shiomi as Yoshinobu Kuroiwa
- Kenichi Endō as Joji Yazaki
- Meisa Kuroki as Aizawa Ruka
- Kyōsuke Yabe as Katagiri Ken
- Kenta Kiritani as Tatsukawa Tokio
- Suzunosuke Tanaka as Tamura Chūta
- Sousuke Takaoka as Izaki Shun
- Goro Kishitani as Takiya Hideo
- Yutaka Matsushige as Ushiyama
- Motoki Fukami as Hayashida "Rindaman" Megumi
- Yusuke Izaki as Mikami Takeshi
- Hisato Izaki as Mikami Manabu
- Shunsuke Daito as Kirishima Hiromi
- Yusuke Kamiji as Tsutsumoto Shōji
- Tsutomu Takahashi as Makise Takashi
- Yu Koyanagi as Sugihara Makoto
- Kaname Endo as Tokaji Yūji
- Dai Watanabe as Bandō Hideto
- Ryo Hashizume as Honjō Toshiaki
- Kazuki Namioka as Washio Gōta

== Release ==
The film was released in Japan on October 27, 2007. It was also screened internationally in Malaysia, Singapore, Taiwan, South Korea, and Hong Kong throughout 2008. The film was released on DVD in the United States on March 31, 2009.

== Reception ==
=== Critical response ===
Najib Zulfikar of Total Film gave 3/5 stars and wrote "Miike amps it all up to 11 in his inimitable style, as impossibly coiffured pretty boys duke it out and the Yakuza take an interest in the outcome. Sadly, the story's so overpopulated it's hard to care who'll survive to graduate." David Brook of Blueprint Review gave the film 2.5/5 stars indicating, "Teenage boys will lap up every minute of it (other than the songs which probably won't appeal to many Westerners) and the lack of obviously 'bad' and 'good' guys means the conclusion wasn't always going to be clear cut (after an hour or so you can see where its heading though)."

=== Box office ===
The film grossed US$22,036,607 worldwide.

== Sequels ==
The film was followed by two sequels: Crows Zero 2 (also directed by Miike) in 2009 and Crows Explode in 2014.

=== Adaptations ===
It was also adapted into a manga illustrated by Kenichirō Naitō and published in Monthly Shōnen Champion magazine.
