= Takashi Ito =

Takashi Ito may refer to:

- Takashi Ito (basketball) (b. 1990), Japanese professional basketball player
- Takashi Ito (director) (b. 1956), Japanese experimental filmmaker
- Takashi Ito (kickboxer) (b. 1970), Japanese former kickboxer
