= Crows Explode =

- Poster
- Directed by: Toshiaki Toyoda
- Based on: Crows by Hiroshi Takahashi
- Starring: Masahiro Higashide; Taichi Saotome; Ryo Katsuji; Kento Nagayama; Yūya Yagira
- Release date: April 12, 2014 (Japan)
- Country: Japan
- Language: Japanese
- Box office: US$10,315,875 (Japan)

Crows Explode (Japanese: クローズ EXPLODE, Hepburn: Kurōzu Explode) is a 2014 Japanese action film directed by Toshiaki Toyoda. It is the third film based on the manga Crows by Hiroshi Takahashi. It is the sequel to 2009's Crows Zero 2. It features new characters and an almost entirely new cast, including Masahiro Higashide and Taichi Saotome. The film was released in Japan on April 12, 2014.

== Plot ==
Kaburagi Kazeo is a new transfer student at Suzuran All-Boys High School. While walking to school, he witnesses a group of students get clipped by a passing town car. He arrives just in time for the "opening ceremony", a showdown between Goura Toru, the school's number one fighter, and another student. The fracas is interrupted by the arrival of Kagami Ryohei, another transfer student, whose arrogance immediately draws the ire of the crowd. Recognizing his vehicle as the town car from earlier, Kazeo confronts Ryohei, who ignores him and walks away. Before he can follow, Kazeo is attacked by another student, Wajima, whom he promptly knocks out with a single punch.

At the Doberman Bar, former mob enforcer Katagiri Ken enjoys a drink while trying to keep a low profile. He encounters Makise Takashi, whom he implores to forget they saw each other. Makise instead ropes Ken into coming to work with him at a local auto dealer. Back at Suzuran, Kazeo is approached by Ogisu Kenichi, who explains that since beating Wajima at the opening ceremony, Kazeo has been ranked as the school's number five fighter. He goes on to suggest that Kazeo might be a contender to take on Goura for the top spot, and that they should join forces. Kazeo rejects the idea, asserting that he has no interest in conquering Suzuran. Meanwhile, Ryohei begins taking on challengers, and proves to be a skilled fighter himself.

Later, at the bar, Kazeo and Kenichi get into a scrap with Shibata Hiroki, the top fighter from neighboring Kurosaki Industrial High. Back at the Nakata dealership, Ken is adjusting well to his new life as a salesman, and has become smitten with the owner, Aya. However, he soon discovers that the local mob is trying to force the shop out in order to redevelop the land. To protect Aya and the business, Ken goes to see the mob boss, Mr. Nara, who refuses to stop pursuing the Nakata property. During the meeting, Ken encounters Fujiwara, a former Kurosaki student turned mob recruit, as well Ryohei. Having known Ryohei's father from his former profession, Ken is disheartened to learn that Ryohei is now being groomed as Nara's successor.

Kazeo visits the cemetery accompanied by his mother, with whom he has a strained relationship. It is revealed that his father was a professional boxer who died due to injuries sustained during a match, and that his mother subsequently developed problems with drinking and gambling. The next day, Ken comes to Suzuran to find Ryohei but runs into Kazeo, with whom he shares stories of his youth at the school. Fujiwara is sent on behalf of the Nara Gang to harass the Nakata shop. He also begins stirring up conflict between Kurosaki and Suzuran as revenge against Shibata, with whom he holds a grudge following an incident which landed Fujiwara in prison. His plan pays off, as an enraged Goura begins attacking Kurosaki students in retaliation. Goura soon learns that Ryohei and Fujiwara are acquainted, but is stabbed by a Kurosaki student.

Shibata confronts Fujiwara, but is defeated and left with a broken arm. Ryohei and his gang begin relentless assaults at Suzuran, resulting in Kenichi being hospitalized. The injured Goura challenges Ryohei, but is also defeated, and Ryohei is named Suzuran's top fighter. Later, Fujiwara and Ryohei return to the Nakata shop to shut it down once and for all, setting fire to the building. Escaping the blaze, Ken seeks out Kazeo and begs him to stop Ryohei, for his own good. Spurred on by the escalating violence, Kazeo assembles his own force to take back the school.

Kazeo leads his gang, joined by Goura, to confront Ryohei and Fujiwara. Despite his injury, Goura singlehandedly dispatches many opponents before taking on Fujiwara himself, where he quickly loses the upper hand. As Fujiwara prepares to finish Goura, Shibata arrives. Noticing burns on Shibata's chest that he caused, Fujiwara admits that he had deserved to have been punished for his actions; he apologizes to Shibata and retreats. Kazeo finally clashes with Ryohei, and after an intense and lengthy battle, he emerges victorious. Ken arrives soon after and whisks the battered Ryohei off for treatment, and away from the influence of the Nara Gang.

Sometime later, the Nakata auto shop has been renovated and is a thriving business again. Kazeo, having become the number one fighter and united the school, faces down the final obstacle on his path to completely conquering Suzuran – the indomitable Rindaman. The film ends as their battle begins.

== Cast ==
- Masahiro Higashide – Kaburagi Kazeo
- Taichi Saotome – Kagami Ryohei
- Ryo Katsuji – Ogisu Kenichi
- Kento Nagayama – Fujiwara Hajime
- Yūya Yagira – Goura Toru
- Motoki Fukami – Hayashida Megumi / Rindaman
- Kyosuke Yabe – Katagiri Ken
- Tsutomu Takahashi – Makise Takashi
- Elliot Rosado Koya (as ELLY) – Yamashita Gohei
- Tomoki Nakamura (as KENZO) – Takagi Tetsuji
- Takanori Iwata – Shibata Hiroki
- Suzu Hirose – Mie Uchida
- Joey Beni

== Production ==
The first trailer was released online by World Cinema News on April 17, 2013. The cast was officially revealed at a press conference on April 3, 2013. Kyosuke Yabe, Tsutomu Takahashi, and Motoki Fukami reprised their roles as Katagiri, Makise, and Rindaman respectively.

== Reception ==
Reviews of the film have been neutral. Mark Schilling of The Japan Times gave it two-and-a-half out of five stars, praising the film's acting and fight sequences, while criticizing the formulaic nature of the genre, saying "After seeing too many fists slamming into too many faces for reasons only testosterone-charged delinquents find compelling, I'm calling time-out on the whole genre."

As of 11 May 2014, the film has grossed US$10,315,875 in Japan.

== Home-Media ==
Crows Explode was released on Blu-ray and DVD in Japan on 22 October 2014, in standard and premium editions. It is set to be released on home media in Spain by Mediatres Estudio, in accordance to an agreement between them and the Tokyo Broadcasting System. The film was released in Spain on a single DVD and on a Blu-ray pack with the previous two films on October 7, 2015.

== Adaptations ==
In conjunction with the release of the film, Shōnen Champion Comics published a one-shot prequel manga titled Crows Explode Gaiden, written by Crows author Hiroshi Takahashi with art by Tetsuhiro Hirakawa. A new manga adaptation, illustrated by Tatsuya Kanda, was launched in the 2018 November issue of Shōnen Champion.
