= Kaname Endo =

Japanese actor (born 1983)

- 遠藤 要
- Born: 25 December 1983 (age 42); Noda, Chiba, Japan
- Other names: Shiro Komiya (former stage name)
- Occupation: Actor
- Years active: 2006-present
- Agent: Avex Vanguard
- Known for: entering a period of suspension in response to the reported illegal gambling on 9 February 2017
- Notable work: Crows Zero
- Television: Teppan
- Height: 175 cm (5 ft 9 in)
- Website: Kaname Endo

Kaname Endo (遠藤 要, Endō Kaname; born 25 December 1983, in Noda, Chiba) is a Japanese actor. His real former stage name is Shiro Komiya (小宮城, Komiya Shiro).

== Filmography ==
=== TV dramas ===
Year	Title	Role	Network	Ref.
2008	Keishichō Sōsaikka 9 Kakari		TV Asahi	
2008	Rookies	Eishin Uesaka	TBS	
2008	Yasuko to Kenji	Iwase	NTV	
2009	Yonimo Kimyōna Monogatari 2009 Aki no Tokubetsu-hen "Jisatsu-sha Recycle-hō"		Fuji TV	
2009	Tokyo Dogs		Fuji TV	
2010	Kettō! Rōjin Tō		Wowow	
2010	Sotsu uta		Fuji TV	
2010	Joker: Yurusa rezaru Sōsa-kan		Fuji TV	
2010	Gekai: Shugoro Hatomura		Fuji TV	
2010	Teppan	Kinya Murakami	NHK Osaka	
2011	Lady: Saigo no Hanzai Profile	Takayuki Hoshino	TBS	
2011	Hanazakari no Kimitachi e	Ryo Otemachi	Fuji TV	
2011	Jiu	Ryoichi Takeuchi	TV Asahi	
2011	Kasōken no Onna: Dai 11 Series	Yasuo Isomura	TV Asahi	
2012	Aibō Season 10 Ganjitsu Special	Takeshi Yamada	TV Asahi	
2012	Densetsu no Kansatsu-i: Oniguma no Jiken-bo		TBS	
2012	Osamu Shirato no Kiken-bo	Daisuke Iwasaki	TBS	
2012	Dragon Seinen-dan	Kenji	MBS	
2012	Depart Shikake Hito! Tamami Tennoji no Satsujin Suiri	Kazuma Murase	ABC	
2012	Ōoku: Tanjō "Yūkō Iemitsu-hen"	Masataka Wada	TBS	
2012	Akutō	Kenji Tadokoro	Fuji TV	
2013	Ataru Special: New York kara no Chōsen-jō!!	Osamu Tsukahara	TBS	
2013	Mierīno Kashiwagi	Shu Tamaki	TV Tokyo	
2013	The Case Files of Biblia Bookstore	Uchiyama	Fuji TV	
2013	Fukuoka Renai Hakusho 8 Megu to Ai-kun	Takeshi Kitajima	KBC	
2013	Last Cinderella	Yusuke	Fuji TV	
2013	Another Face: Keiji Sōmu-ka Tetsu Otomo	Hiromi Shibuya	ABC	
2013	Furueru Ushi	Koji Ikemoto	Wowow	
2013	Saito-san 2	Shinji Maezono	NTV	
2013	Kosuke Kindaichi Vs Kogoro Akechi	Kiichiro Yoshiike	Fuji TV	
2013	Keiji no Shōmei	Motoya Sonezaki	TV Tokyo	
2013	Kurokōchi	Taichi Tsubokura	TBS	
2013	Olympic no Minoshirokin	Tetsuo Kurahashi	TV Asahi	
2014	Gunshi Kanbei	Bunshiro Ibuki	NHK	
2014	Urethro Mi Taiken Shōjo	Kabu	TV Tokyo	
2014	Maruho no Onna: Hoken Hanzai Chōsa-in	Naoya Kurata	TV Tokyo	
2014	Aoi Honō	Masahiko Minami	TV Tokyo	
2014	Kabuka Bōraku	Shuhei Tasaki	Wowow	
2015	Mondainoaru Restaurant		Fuji TV	
2015	Kōhaku ga Umaretahi	Dick Mine	NHK	
2015	Yōkoso, Wagaya e		Fuji TV	
2015	I'm Home		TV Asahi	
2015	Shugoshin Bodyguard Teru Shindo	Kazuya Dozono	TBS	
2015	Keishichō Minamidaira Han: Shichinin no Keiji	Naoya Sakakibara	TBS	
2015	Kenji Masao Sawaki	Yosuke Shinoda	TV Tokyo	
2015	Okutama Chūzai Deka	Takashi Shiboku	TV Tokyo	
2015	High & Low: The Story Of S.W.O.R.D.	Ukyo	NTV	
2016	AKB Horror Night: Adrenaline no yoru		TV Asahi	
2016	Gold Woman	Oyamada	TV Asahi	
2016	"Kutabare" Bocchan	Sota Tadoroki	NHK	
2016	Soshite, Dare mo inaku natta	Seratakeshi Kawano / fake Shinichi Todo	NTV	
2016	Yassan: Tsukiji-hatsu! Oishī Jiken-bo	Inamori	TV Tokyo	

=== Films ===
Year	Title	Role	Ref.
2006	The Fast and the Furious: Tokyo Drift		
2007	Crows Zero	Yuji Tokaji	
2008	Nonko 36-sai (Kaji Tetsudai)		
2009	Crows Zero II	Yuji Tokaji	
2009	20th Century Boys		
2009	Yellow Kid	Tamura	
2009	Kyō kara Hit Man	Tanaka	
2009	Kaiji: Jinsei Gyakuten Game		
2010	Box!		
2010	Box Hakamada Jiken: Inochi to Wa		
2010	Odoru Daisōsasen The Movie 3 Yatsu-ra o Kaihō seyo!	Metropolitan Police Department investigator	
2010	Koi no Tadashī Hōhō wa Hon ni mo Sekkeizu ni mo Notte inai	Shuchi Hasegawa	
2010	SP: The Motion Picture	Kurata	
2011	Hard Romantic-er	Park Yong-Ou	
2012	Afro Tanaka	Daisuke Murata	
2013	Platinu-Data	Minoru Tokura	
2013	Monster		
2013	Ryusei	Toru Yamakawa	
2014	Gaki Rock		
2015	Obverse and reverse	Kyoichi Domae	
2016	High & Low: The Movie	Ukyo	

=== Stage ===
Year	Title	Role	Ref.
2014	AVM		
2014	Friend –Konya koko de no Ichi to In-mori-		
2016	Macbeth	Macduff	

=== Variety ===
Year	Title	Network
2013	run for money Tōsō-chū	Fuji TV
2014	Wao	Fuji TV

=== DVD ===
Year	Title	Role
2008	Takeru Satoh First DVD My Color	
2009	Gachiban VI: Yajū Kōrin	Jo Kurogane

=== Advertisements ===
Product	Title
Sega	Phantasy Star Portable
Toyota	Next One

=== CD ===
Artist	Title
Real'	Usotsuki

=== Radio ===
Year	Title	Network	Ref.
2009	Shun Oguri no All Night Nippon	NBS	

== Awards ==
Award	Category
65th Mainichi Film Awards	Sponichi Grand Prix Rookie Award
