= Ryo Katsuji =

Japanese actor and voice actor

- 勝地 涼
- Born: August 20, 1986 (age 39); Tokyo, Japan
- Occupation: Actor
- Years active: 2000–present
- Agent: Foster
- Spouse: Atsuko Maeda (m. 2018; div. 2021)
- Children: 1
- Website: www.web-foster.com/pc/artists/Katsuji/Ryo

Ryo Katsuji (勝地 涼, Katsuji Ryō; born August 20, 1986, in Tokyo) is a Japanese actor and voice actor. He graduated from the Horikoshi High School.

== Filmography ==
=== Films ===
- Tales of the Unusual (2000), Ōishi Chikara
- All About Lily Chou-Chou (2001), Hitoshi Terawaki
- Yume Oikakete (2003), Junichi
- Battle Royale II (2003), Haruya Sakurai
- Hanging Garden (2005), Morisaki
- Aegis (2005), Kou Kisaragi
- A Heartful of Love (2005), Teruyoshi Fukawa
- Origin: Spirits of the Past (2006) (voice), Agito
- Hana yori mo naho (2006), Sōemon Aoki
- Kōfuku na Shokutaku (2007), Bengaku Ōura
- Tokyo Tower: Mom and Me, and Sometimes Dad (2007), Hiraguri
- Kisshō Tennyo (2007), Ryō Tōno
- Awa Dance (2007), Kōji Tachibana
- The Shōnen Merikensack] (2009), Masaru
- Waiting for Good News (2009), Wataru Niigaki
- The Shock Labyrinth (2009), Motoki
- Mobile Suit Gundam 00 the Movie: A Wakening of the Trailblazer (2010) (voice), Descartes Shaman
- Surely Someday (2010), Kyōhei Manabe
- Hankyū Densha (2011), Keiichi Kosaka
- Ogawa no Hotori (2011), Shinzō
- Kita no Kanaria Tachi (2012), Naoki Ikushima
- Reunion (Asu e no Tōkakan) (2013), Yūta Oikawa
- Kodomo Keisatsu (2013), Shin Kunimitsu
- Crows Explode (2014), Kenichi Ogisu
- The Vancouver Asahi (2014), Kei Kitamoto
- Eating Women (2018), Shiraishi
- Gintama 2 (2018), Shige Shige Tokugawa
- Masquerade Hotel (2019)
- Silent Tokyo (2020)
- Underdog (2020), Shun Miyaki
- Nemesis: The Mystery of the Golden Spiral (2023), Takahiro "Taka" Chikuma
- Saint Young Men: The Movie (2024), Śakra
- New Interpretation of the End of Edo Period (2025), Tokugawa Yoshinobu

=== TV dramas ===
- Atsuhime (2008), John Manjirō
- Yae's Sakura (2013), Yamakawa Kenjirō
- Nemesis (2021), Takahiro "Taka" Chikuma
- The Laughing Salesman (2025)

=== TV films ===
- Live for this Love (TBS, 2005)
- Sukoshi wa, Ongaeshi ga Dekitakana (TBS, 2006)
- Satomi Hakkenden (TBS, 2006)
- Papa no Namida de Ko wa Sodatsu (Fuji TV, 2007)
- Kurobe no Taiyo (Fuji TV, 2009)
- America ni Makenakatta Otoko (TV Tokyo, 2020), Kiichi Miyazawa
- Shimura Ken to Drif no Daibakushō Monogatari (Fuji TV, 2021), Cha Katō

=== Anime television series ===
- Un-Go (2011), Yuki Shinjuro

=== Video games ===
- Drag-On Dragoon 2: Fuin no kurenai, haitoku no kuro (2005) (voice: Japanese version) - Nowe

=== Japanese dubbing ===
- Power Rangers (2017), Jason Scott/Red Ranger (Dacre Montgomery)

== Recognitions ==
- 29th Japan Academy Film Prize: Best Newcomer for Aegis (2006)
