= Hiroshi Takahashi (artist) =

Japanese manga artist

- Born: 12 December 1965 (age 60); Aizubange, Fukushima Prefecture, Japan
- Occupation: Manga artist
- Known for: Crows

Hiroshi Takahashi (高橋 ヒロシ, Takahashi Hiroshi; born 12 December 1965) is a Japanese manga artist.

== Profile ==
Takahashi is mostly known from his manga Crows, Worst and QP. Crows was loosely adapted into three live-action films: Crows Zero in 2007, Crows Zero 2 in 2009 and Crows Explode in 2014. Another manga of his, QP was adapted into a live-action TV series of the same name in 2011. Crows was adapted into a 2-episode OVA series named Koukou Butouden Crows. Takahashi's latest work is called Jank Runk Family, published in the 19th issue of Akita Shoten's Young Champion magazine.

== Works ==
=== Manga ===
- Hey! Riki (1989), debut work
- Crows (1990–1998), serialized in Monthly Shōnen Champion
  - Crows Gaiden (2014 – present), serialized in Monthly Shōnen Champion
- Kiku (1992–1993), serialized in Weekly Shōnen Champion
- QP (1999–2001), serialized in Young King
- Worst (2001–2013), serialized in Monthly Shōnen Champion
  - Worst Gaiden (2009), serialized in Monthly Shōnen Champion
- Jank Runk Family (ジャンク・ランク・ファミリー, janku ranku famirī) (September 2016 – January 2026), serialized in Young Champion

=== Other ===
- Drop (novel illustrations), story by Hiroshi Shinagawa
- Examurai Sengoku (character design)

== Adaptations ==
Several works by Hiroshi Takahashi have been adapted into other forms of media.

- Crows Zero (2007 film)
- Crows Zero 2 (2009 film)
- QP (2011 TV series)
- Crows Explode (2014 film)
