= Teppan (TV series) =

- Genre: Drama
- Written by: Toshio Terada; Masako Imai; Erika Seki
- Directed by: Tsuyoshi Inoue
- Starring: Miori Takimoto; Narumi Yasuda; Ken'ichi Endō; Kaname Endo; Naoyuki Morita; Aki Asakura; Shingo Yanagisawa; Toshinori Omi; Seiya Osada; Satoshi Matsuda; Shūji Kashiwabara; Tamiyasu Cho; Miyuki Kawanaka; Hidekazu Akai; Rie Tomosaka; Hiroshi Kanbe; Satoru Matsuo; Koki Maeda; Kotomi Kyono; Raita Ryū; Sumiko Fuji
- Narrated by: Tamao Nakamura
- Opening theme: "Himawari" by Taro Hakase
- Country of origin: Japan
- Original language: Japanese
- No. of episodes: 151

Production
- Producer: Kazuki Miki
- Running time: 15 minutes
- Production company: NHK Osaka

Original release
- Network: NHK
- Release: September 27, 2010 – April 2, 2011

Teppan (てっぱん) is a Japanese television drama that aired on NHK in 2010–2011. It was the 83rd Asadora. It starred a new actress, Miori Takimoto, in the role of a young woman raised by an adopted family in Onomichi who learns of her real grandmother and decides to move to Osaka to start an okonomiyaki restaurant. The title word "teppan" refers to the metal surface on which okonomiyaki are cooked. The series, while interrupted by the Tohoku earthquake, averaged a 17.2% rating (in the Kanto region), making it the fourth most popular of the Asadora dramas in the previous five years.

== Cast ==
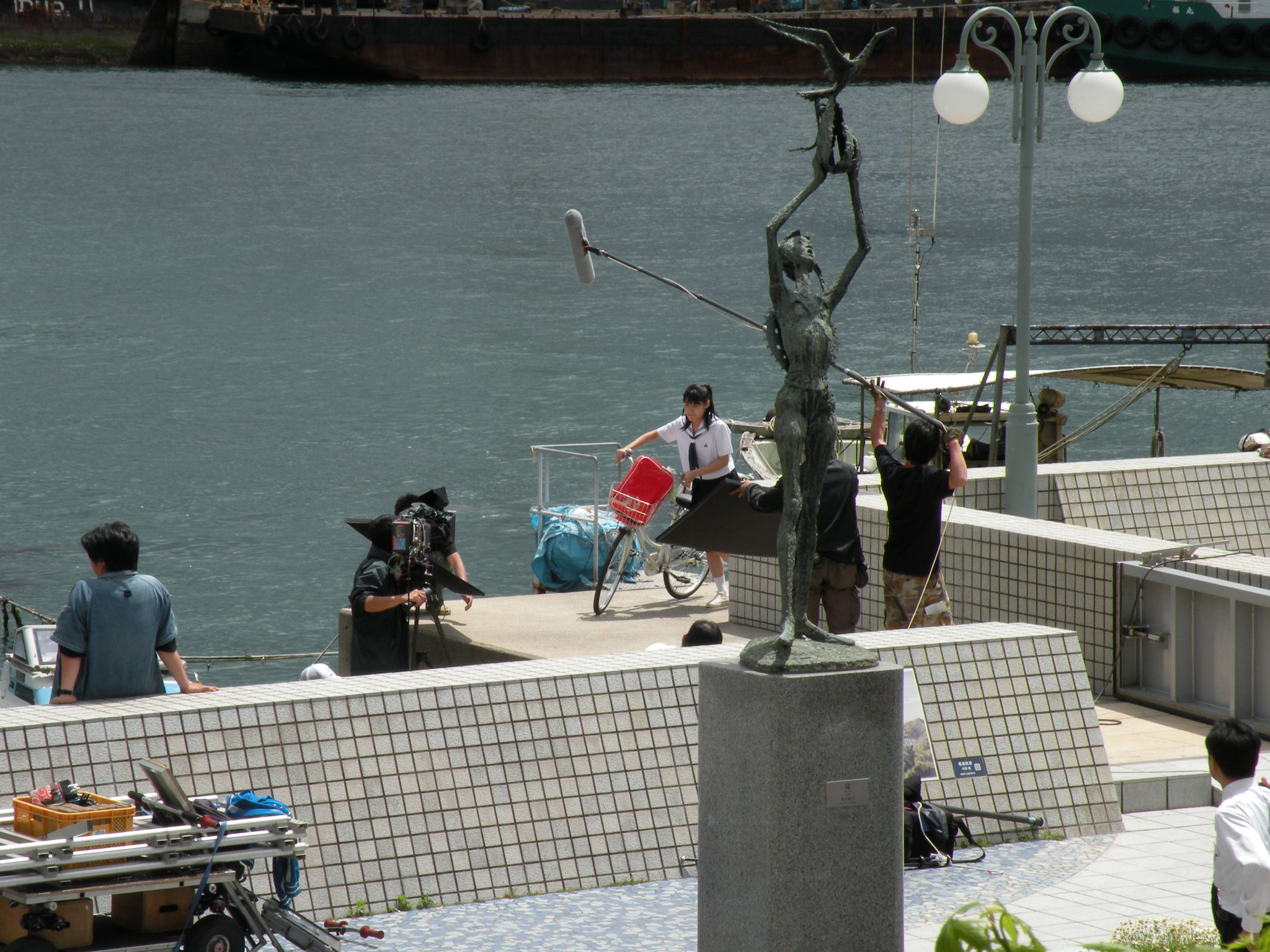
Teppan being filmed on location

- Miori Takimoto, as Akari Murakami, the heroine
- Narumi Yasuda, as Michiko Murakami, Akari's adoptive mother
- Ken'ichi Endō, as Jō Murakami, Akari's adoptive father
- Kaname Endo as Kinya Murakami
- Naoyuki Morita as Teppei Murakami
- Aki Asakura as Kana Shinomiya, Akari's friend
- Shingo Yanagisawa as Kyuta Shinomiya, Kana's father
- Toshinori Omi as Ryuen Yokoyama
- Seiya Osada as Kaoru Takizawa, a marathon runner
- Satoshi Matsuda as Takashi Nemoto, Kaoru's coach
- Shūji Kashiwabara as Jun Iwasaki
- Tamiyasu Cho as Hajime Hamano
- Miyuki Kawanaka as Sayoko Matsushita
- Hidekazu Akai as Eiji Kanda
- Rie Tomosaka as Fuyumi Nishino
- Hiroshi Kanbe as Takuro Sasai, an artist
- Satoru Matsuo as Toru Nakaoka
- Koki Maeda as Tamio Nakaoka, Toru's son
- Kotomi Kyono as Nozomi Kobayakawa
- Raita Ryu as Den Hasegawa
- Sumiko Fuji, as Hatsune Tanaka, Akari's real grandmother
- Tamao Nakamura (narrator)
- Haruka Kinami, as Tanaka Chiharu

== International broadcast ==
- The broadcast rights for the drama were sold to Sri Lanka with the intention of dubbing it into Sinhalese.

| Preceded by Gegege no Nyobo | Asadora; 27 September 2010 – 2 April 2011 | Succeeded by Ohisama |
