= Shunsuke Daito =

Japanese actor and fashion model (born 1986)

Shunsuke Daitō
- 大東 駿介
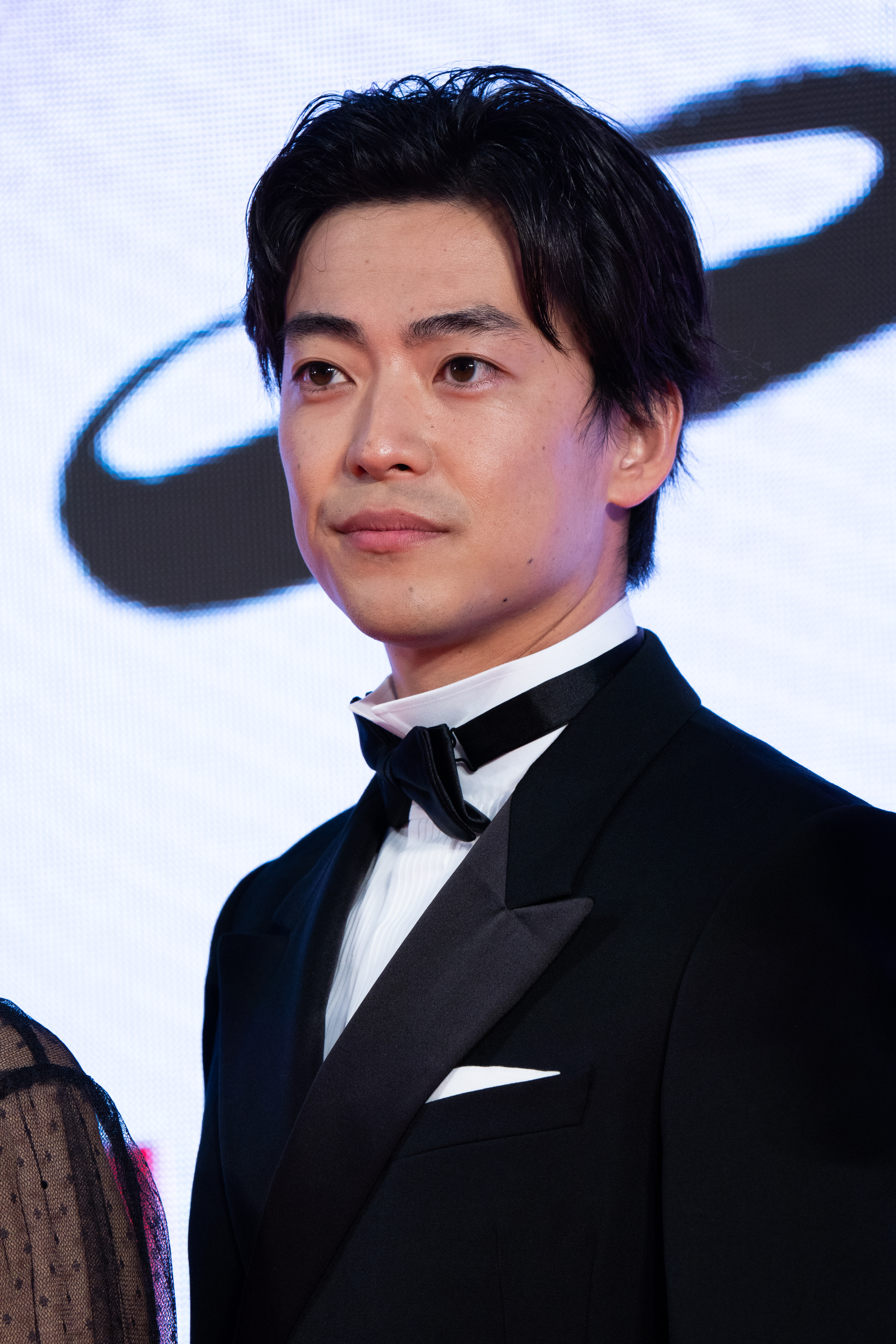
- Daitō at the Tokyo International Film Festival in 2019
- Born: March 13, 1986 (age 40); Osaka, Japan
- Occupation: Actor
- Years active: 2005–present
- Agent: Blue Label
- Height: 1.82 m (5 ft 11 1/2 in)
- Spouse: Unknown (m. 2015)
- Children: 3
- Website: http://www.shunsuke-daitoh.com/

Shunsuke Daito (大東 駿介, Daitōh Shunsuke; born March 13, 1986) is a Japanese actor and fashion model. Currently, he is employed by the Blue Label a subsidiary of TV Asahi. Since debuting in 2005's Nobuta wo Produce, he has appeared in many Japanese dramas, movies, variety shows and on stage.

== Early life ==
Daito was born on March 13, 1986, in Sakai, Osaka, as an only child. His mother ran a home-based dry cleaning shop, while his father worked as a taxi driver. When he was in the third grade of elementary school, his parents divorced. He had no contact with his father until his father's death. After the separation, he lived with his mother, who "raised" him as a single parent until he reached junior high school. However, on November 30, 2019, in an episode of A-Studio, Daito revealed that his mother neglected him as a child, leaving him at home for long periods without proper financial support. As a result, he experienced extreme poverty in his second year of junior high school and became socially withdrawn for a time. When his aunt learned about his home situation, she took him in and raised him. He recalled, "My aunt raised me like her own child."

== Personal life ==
According to an interview with News Post Seven on June 4, 2020, Daito married an ordinary woman in December 2015 and that they have three kids together.

== Filmography ==
=== Television ===
Year	English Title	Japanese Title	Role	Ref.
2005	Nobuta wo Produce	野ブタ。をプロデュース	Kenta Taniguchi	
2006	Isshūkan no Koi	一週間の恋		
2006	Sukoshi wa, Ongaeshi ga Dekita ka na	少しは、恩返しができたかな	Table Tennis Club Member	
2006	Punchline	パンチライン	Kazuma Saitō	
2006	Delicious Proposal	おいしいプロポーズ	Shō Fujita	
2006	Teppan Shōjo Akane!!	鉄板少女アカネ!!	Episode 4 Guest	
2006	Anna-san no Omame	アンナさんのおまめ	Yū Kameda	
2007	Himitsu no Hanazono	ヒミツの花園	Comic Editor Staff Miura	
2007	First Kiss	ファースト・キス	Kōji Haneda	
2007	Hanazakari no Kimitachi e	花ざかりの君たちへ	Shin Sano	
2008	The Negotiator	交渉人〜THE NEGOTIATOR〜	Yoshihiro Iizuka	
2008	My Sassy Girl	猟奇的な彼女	Ryōsuke Takami	
2008	Shibatora	シバトラ〜童顔刑事・柴田竹虎〜	Gakuto Katō	
2008	Love17	Love17	Shinya Azuki	
2008	Rescue	Rescue～特別高度救助隊	Tsuyoshi Kohinata	
2009	Giwaku	疑惑		
2009	Love Shuffle	ラブシャッフル	Yōji Takigawa	
2009	Twin Spica	ふたつのスピカ	Shinnosuke Fuchuya	
2009	Welkame	連続テレビ小説 ウェルかめ	Masaru Yamada	
2009	Shaken Baby!	しぇいけんBABY!	Eita Shima	
2010	Tumbling	タンブリング	Ryūichiro Kiyama	
2010	Nagareboshi	流れ星	Makoto Toshiro	
2010	Ojichan wa 25-sai	おじいちゃんは25歳	Kensuke Kurihara	
2011	Lady	Lady〜最後の犯罪プロファイル〜	Episode 3 Guest	
2011	Ouran High School Host Club	桜蘭高校ホスト部	Kyoya Ootori	
2012	Taira no Kiyomori	平清盛	Taira no Iemori	
2015	Burning Flower	花燃ゆ	Hoshino Chōtarō	
2015	Age Harassment	エイジハラスメント	Toshiyuki Ueda	
2019	Idaten	いだてん ～東京オリムピック噺～	Yoshiyuki Tsuruta	
2020	Young GTO	湘南純愛組!	Kyōsuke Masaki	
2021	Nakamura Nakazo: Shusse no Kizahashi	中村仲蔵 出世階段		
2021	Zenkamono	前科者	Jirō Ishikawa	
2022	Lost Man Found	拾われた男	Sugita	
2023	Ranman	らんまん	Hayato Kuraki	
2023	Ōoku: The Inner Chambers	大奥	Hitotsubashi Yoshinobu	
2026	Brothers in Arms	豊臣兄弟!	Maeda Toshiie	
2026	Lost and Found	ロスト・アンド・ファウンド 君を探して	Kenji	

=== Movies ===
Year	English Title	Japanese Title	Role	Ref.
2007	Young Thugs: Chinatown Romeo and Juliet	岸和田少年愚連隊 中華街のロミオとジュリエット		
2007	Crows Zero	クローズZERO	Hiromi Kirishima	
2008	The Chasing World	リアル鬼ごっこ	Hiroshi Satō	
2008	Tabidachi (Ashoro Yori)	旅立ち〜足寄より〜	Chiharu Matsuyama	
2008	Nakitai Toki no Kusuri	泣きたいときのクスリ	Ryūichi	
2009	Crows Zero 2	クローズZERO II	Hiromi Kirishima	
2009	My Girlfriend's a Geek	腐女子彼女。	Hinata Suwa	
2009	Your Story	女の子ものがたり	Taka	
2012	Ace Attorney	逆転裁判	Dick Gumshoe	
2014	Tokyo Tribe	TOKYO TRIBE	Iwao	
2015	125 Years Memory	海難1890	Shintaro	
2017	Homecoming	望郷		
2018	Kamen Rider Heisei Generations Forever	仮面ライダー平成ジェネレーションズFOREVER	Tid/Another Kuuga/Another Ultimate Kuuga	
2019	108: Revenge and Adventure of Goro Kaiba	108〜海馬五郎の復讐と冒険〜	Seiya	
2020	37 Seconds	37 Seconds	Toshiya	
2021	Tomorrow's Dinner Table	明日の食卓	Taichi Ishibashi	
2021	The Sound of Grass	草の響き	Kenji Sakuma	
2022	The Broken Commandment	破戒		
2022	Violence Action	バイオレンスアクション	Ayabe	
2023	G-Men	Gメン	Sakurai	
2024	Sin and Evil	罪と悪		
2024	My Home Hero: The Movie	映画 マイホームヒーロー	Yakushiji	
2024	The Voices at War	劇場版 アナウンサーたちの戦争	Seijun Shimura	
2025	Thus Spoke Rohan Kishibe: At a Confessional	岸辺露伴は動かない 懺悔室	Mizuo	
2027	Kasuka na Kare o Dakishimete	かすかな彼を抱きしめて		

=== Video games ===
Year	English Title	Japanese Title	Role	Ref.
2012	Yakuza 5	龍が如く5 夢、叶えし者	Shigeki Baba	
2014	Ryu ga Gotoku Ishin!	龍が如く 維新！	Tōdō Heisuke	
2025	Like a Dragon: Pirate Yakuza in Hawaii	龍が如く8 外伝パイレーツ イン ハワイ	Mortimer	
