= Crows Zero 2 =

2009 Japanese action film

- Directed by: Takashi Miike
- Screenplay by: Shogo Muto
- Based on: Crows by Hiroshi Takahashi
- Produced by: Mataichiro Yamamoto
- Starring: Shun Oguri; Shunsuke Daitō; Suzunosuke Tanaka; Sōsuke Takaoka; Kyōsuke Yabe; Takayuki Yamada; Yusuke Nakajima
- Cinematography: Nobuyasu Kita
- Edited by: Shuichi Kakesu; Tomoki Nagasaka
- Release date: April 11, 2009 (Japan)
- Running time: 133 minutes
- Country: Japan
- Language: Japanese
- Box office: $29,893,636

Crows Zero 2 (クローズZERO II, Kurōzu Zero 2) is a 2009 Japanese action film directed by Takashi Miike, written by Shogo Muto and produced by Mataichiro Yamamoto. It is a sequel to Crows Zero, where Shun Oguri, Kyōsuke Yabe, Meisa Kuroki and Takayuki Yamada reprise their roles from the prequel.

Crows Zero 2 was released in Japan on April 11, 2009.

== Plot ==
Eight months after triumphing over Serizawa Tamao, Takiya Genji struggles to attain supremacy at Suzuran All-Boys High School. Following a decisive defeat at the hands of the legendary Rindaman and on the verge of graduating without fulfilling his goal, Genji grows desperate and begins challenging Rindaman regularly, but consistently gets defeated in the battle.

Genji's situation escalates when he unwittingly breaks a non-aggression pact between Suzuran and a rival school Housen Academy by saving Kawanishi Noboru during a confrontation. Genji learns that the agreement between the two schools was established two years prior when Noboru violated a gang law due to a skirmish and used a weapon to fatally wound Housen's former leader Bitō Makio. Suzuran had subsequently sworn not to interfere with Housen's retribution upon Noboru's release from prison. With the pact being broken due to Genji's stubbornness, Genji's alliance, mainly Serizawa, asks him to be prepared for the upcoming tension that will be created between the two schools.

Genji's protection of Kawanishi provokes Housen's current leader Narumi Taiga to declare war against Suzuran. Genji and his allies engage in several violent conflicts with Housen's Army of Killers. One such incident leads to the destruction of Suzuran by Gota Washio's foolishness. Washio was previously affiliated with Suzuran, but was banned by Genji, which leads to him joining Housen Academy.

In an attempt to exact revenge on Genji, Washio burnt the entire Suzuran school. This leads to the GPS being united for a final stand against Housen Academy. The gang leaders decide to meet at the top of Housen Academy for the final fight, where Genji finally defeats Narumi and his Army of Killers. On his last day at school, Genji challenges Rindaman again, where Genji manages to knockdown Rindaman, much to everyone's astonishment and happiness, but Genji still lost.

== Cast ==
- Shun Oguri as Takiya Genji
- Takayuki Yamada as Serizawa Tamao
- Kuroki Meisa as Aizawa Ruka genji's Girlfriend
- Kyōsuke Yabe as Katagiri Ken
- Kenta Kiritani as Tatsukawa Tokio
- Suzunosuke Tanaka as Tamura Chūta
- Sōsuke Takaoka as Izaki Shun
- Goro Kishitani as Takiya Hideo
- Motoki Fukami as Hayashida Rindaman Megumi
- Shunsuke Daito as Kirishima Hiromi
- Tsutomu Takahashi as Makise Takashi
- Yusuke Kamiji as Tsutsumoto Shōji
- Yutaka Matsushige as Ushiyama
- Yusuke Izaki as Mikami Manabu
- Hisato Izaki as Mikami Takeshi
- Ryō Hashizume as Honjō Toshiaki
- Yu Koyanagi as Sugihara Makoto
- Kaname Endo as Tokaji Yūji
- Shinnosuke Abe as Kawanishi Noboru
- Yoshiyuki Yamaguchi as Bitō Makio
- Nobuaki Kaneko as Narumi Taiga
- Kengo Ohkuchi as Kumagiri Rikiya
- Tomoya Warabino as Shibayama Hayato
- Gō Ayano as Urushibara Ryō
- Kazuki Namioka as Washio Gōta
- Haruma Miura as Bitō Tatsuya
- โอม ดามากูชิ

== Release ==
The film was released in Japan on 11 April 2009. It was also screened internationally in Singapore, Russia and Hong Kong throughout 2009. The film was released in US at the Santa Barbara International Film Festival on February 6, 2010.

== Reception ==
=== Box office ===
The film grossed US$29,893,636 worldwide.

=== Critical response ===
Niels Matthijs of Twitch Film wrote "Visually Crows Zero II is still looking incredibly slick. Maybe not as many landmark shots, but the dense and graffiti-laden backgrounds make for a tasty looking film alright. The fighting scenes are still a blast to behold too, with strong, intense and action-driven camera work and some tight editing to keep the adrenaline flowing." Likewise, Mark Schilling of The Japan Times gave 3.5/5 stars and wrote "Miike directs with an energy, velocity and cheeky bravado that are pure punk. He also understands why his Suzuran toughs fight as easily as they breathe – it's not just a release for their raging hormones, but a way of being with their friends and telling the world they exist."

== Sequels & adaptations ==
The film was followed by a sequel titled Crows Explode and was released in 2014. It was also adapted into a manga titled Crows Zero II: Suzuran x Housen, which is illustrated by Hirakawa Tetsuhiro (writer of Clover) and published in Bessatsu Shōnen Champion magazine.
