= Worst (manga) =

Japanese delinquent manga series by Hiroshi Takahashi

- Cover of the first tankōbon volume, featuring Hana Tsukishima

ワースト (Wāsuto)
- Genre: Yankī
- Manga
- Written by: Hiroshi Takahashi
- Published by: Akita Shoten
- English publisher: NA: Digital Manga Publishing
- Magazine: Monthly Shōnen Champion
- Original run: 2001 – July 6, 2013
- Volumes: 33
- Related
- Crows

Worst (Japanese: ワースト, Hepburn: Wāsuto) is a Japanese delinquent manga series written and illustrated by Hiroshi Takahashi. It has the same setting as Takahashi's previous manga Crows and QP and revolves around a group of teenage boys who fight their way through the notorious high school Suzuran.

The manga was first published by Monthly Shōnen Champion in 2001. The series is currently being serialized in Japan and has been collected into twenty-five tankōbon volumes. In North America, Digital Manga Publishing has released only three volumes, with the last graphic novel released in November 2004.

Hiroshi Takahashi had also released Worst Gaiden, which is the short collection of sides stories for the Worst series.

The Worst manga has had over 46 million copies in circulation.

== Plot ==
Hana Tsukishima is a country boy who recently moved to the city to enroll in the infamous Suzuran High School. He is a good guy, ingenuous and honest, but he is also very strong. During his first days at the school, he is involved in the Ichinen Sensō, the "war of the first year", where the strongest of the newly enrolled is decided. Before his first round, he announces that his goal is to become the leader of Suzuran High. From there on, he and his friends are embroiled in gangs and rival school disputes, led by clan-logic and strength hierarchy.

== Volume listing ==
Worst (manga) at Anime News Network's encyclopedia

No.	Original release date	Original ISBN	English release date	English ISBN
1	May 30, 2002	978-4253202176	August 25, 2004	978-1-56970-983-2
2	May 30, 2002	978-4253202183	September 25, 2004	978-1-56970-982-5
3	October 3, 2002	978-4253202190	November 25, 2004	978-1-56970-981-8
4	January 9, 2003	978-4253202206	—	—
5	May 1, 2003	978-4253202213	—	—
6	September 4, 2003	978-4253202220	—	—
7	January 8, 2004	978-4253202237	—	—
8	April 30, 2004	978-4253202244	—	—
9	August 5, 2004	978-4253202251	--	—
10	December 9, 2004	978-4253202268	—	—
11	April 8, 2005	978-4253202275	—	—
12	September 8, 2005	978-4253202282	—	—
13	December 8, 2005	978-4253202299	—	—
14	April 7, 2006	978-4253202305	—	—
15	August 8, 2006	978-4253202312	—	—
16	December 8, 2006	978-4253202329	—	—
17	April 6, 2007	978-4253202336	—	—
18	August 8, 2007	978-4253202343	—	—
19	Janunary 6, 2008	978-4253202350	—	—
20	May 6, 2008	978-4253202367	—	—
21	October 8, 2008	978-4253202374	—	—
22	February 6, 2009	978-4253202381	—	—
23	February 6, 2010	978-4253202398	—	—
24	June 8, 2010	978-4253202404	—	—
25	November 6, 2010	978-4253216159	—	—
26	April 6, 2011	978-4253216166	—	—
27	August 1, 2011	978-4253216173	—	—
28	January 6, 2012	978-4253216180	—	—
29	May 1, 2012	978-4253216197	—	—
30	October 5, 2012	978-4253216203	—	—
31	February 8, 2013	978-4253216210	—	—
32	June 7, 2013	978-4253216227	—	—
33	December 6, 2013	978-4253216234	—	—

== Reception ==
As of 15 January 2012, volume 28 has sold more than 200,000 copies.
