= Monthly Shōnen Champion =

Japanese manga magazine

- Cover of the September 2013 issue of Monthly Shōnen Champion, published by Akita Shoten on August 6, 2013
- Categories: Shōnen manga
- Frequency: Monthly
- Publisher: Akita Shoten
- First issue: March 1970
- Country: Japan
- Based in: Tokyo
- Language: Japanese
- Website: www.akitashoten.co.jp/m-champion

Monthly Shōnen Champion (Japanese: 月刊少年チャンピオン, Hepburn: Gekkan Shōnen Champion) is a Japanese shōnen manga anthology. It is published by Akita Shoten since March 1970.

It became a monthly magazine with the December issue released in November 1970, and was renamed to its current name with the January 1975 issue released in December 1974.

== Manga artists and series ==
- Daijiro Morohoshi
  - Mudmen
- Hideo Azuma
  - Chibi Mama-chan
  - Kakuto Family
  - Yadorigi-kun
- Hideyuki Yonehara
  - Chocolate Blus
- Hiroshi Takahashi
  - Crows
  - Worst
- Keiji Nakazawa
  - Advance! Donganden
  - Genkotsu Iwata
- Kenjiro Kawatsu
  - No Bra
- Kentarō Yano
  - Hunter Killer Mina
  - Masami no Kimochi
- Masaki Satou
  - Bokura Chōjō Club Desu
  - Mirai Ningen Go Go Go
- Miki Tori
  - Tamanegi Parco
  - Tokimeki Brain
- Mitsuteru Yokoyama
  - His Name Is 101
- Morishige
  - Hanaukyo Maid Team
- Nagisa Fujita
  - Do Chokkyuu Kareshi x Kanojo
- Yū Minamoto
  - Samurai Harem: Asu no Yoichi
- Shinigo Honda
  - Creature!
