= Piercing (disambiguation) =

Piercing most commonly refers to body piercing.

It may also refer to:

- Piercing (metalworking), a manufacturing process for cutting webs, sheet metal, and plates
- Piercing (novel)
- Piercing (film), a 2018 horror film
- "Piercing", a 2001 song by Katy Hudson (later known as Katy Perry)

== See also ==
- Rotary piercing, a metalworking process for forming seamless tubes
- Piercing set, a concept in computational geometry
