= Yumi Asō =

Japanese actress (born 1963)

- 麻生 祐未
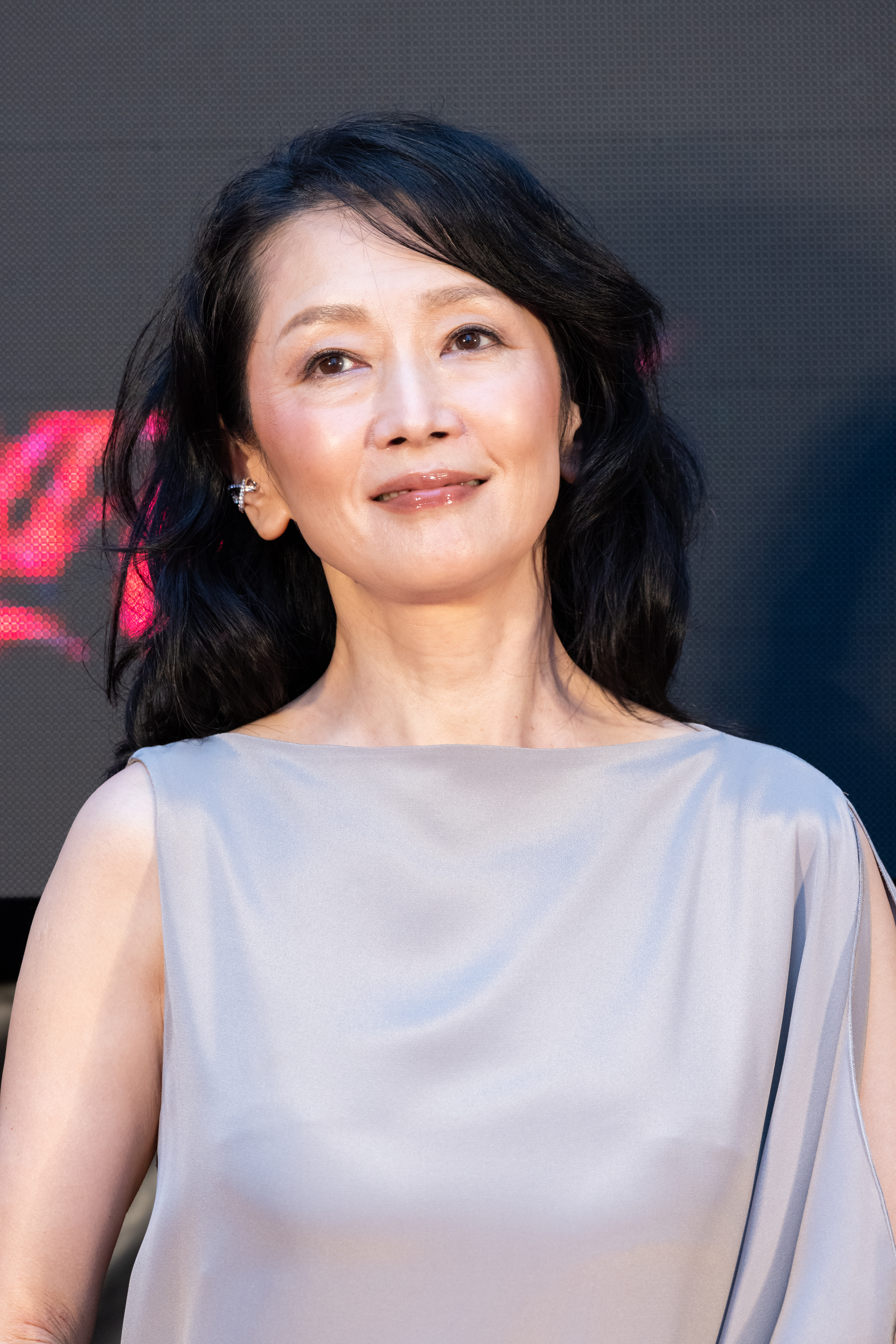
- Asō at the 37th Tokyo International Film Festival in 2024
- Born: Yumi Okumura; August 15, 1963 (age 63); Osaka Prefecture, Japan
- Occupation: Actress
- Years active: 1983–present
- Spouse: Toshiya Nagasawa (m. 2004; div. 2008)
- Children: 1

Yumi Okumura (奥村 由美, Okumura Yumi; born August 15, 1963), better known by the stage name Yumi Asō (麻生 祐未, Asō Yumi), is a Japanese actress. She is a niece of singer Chiyo Okumura.

== Biography ==
She was born in Osaka Prefecture but grew up in Nagasaki Prefecture. She graduated from Aoyama Gakuin University.

She appeared in Yōjirō Takita's 1986 film Comic Magazine with Yuya Uchida and Beat Takeshi. She also appeared in Lee Sang-il's 2002 film Border Line with Tetsu Sawaki and Ken Mitsuishi.

== Personal life ==
She married actor Toshiya Nagasawa in March 2004, and they had one child. The couple separated less than two years later, and officially divorced in 2008.

== Selected filmography ==
=== Film ===
- Aitsu to Lullaby (1983)
- Comic Magazine (1986)
- Yakuza Tosei no Suteki na Menmen (1988)
- Kachō Kōsaku Shima (1992)
- The Abe Clan (1995)
- Tetto Musashino-sen (1997)
- Detective Riko (1998)
- Yūjō: Friendship (1998)
- Kizuna (1998)
- Detective Riko: Megami no Eien (1998)
- Border Line (2002)
- Last Scene (2002)
- Rockers (2003)
- Survive Style 5+ (2004)
- The Pavillion Salamandre (2006)
- Oh! Oku (2006)
- Koizora (2007)
- Love for Beginners (2012)
- We Were There (2012)
- My Little Sweet Pea (2013)
- Angel Home (2013)
- The Mourner (2015)
- Age Harassment (2015)
- Shippu Rondo (2016)
- Kiseki: Sobito of That Day (2017)
- Nakuna Akaoni (2019)
- Perfect Days (2023)
- The Harbor Lights (2025), Emiko Kaneko
- The Bird Is Calling (2025), Nobuko Kuki
- My Crazy Feminist Girlfriend (2026)
- Last Dance (2027)

=== Television ===
- Musashibō Benkei (1986), Shizuka Gozen
- Takeda Shingen (1988), Nōhime
- Aishiteiru to Itte Kure (1995), Hikaru Shimada
- Honmamon (2001–2002)
- Journey Under the Midnight Sun (2006)
- Ryūsei no Kizuna (2008)
- Jin (2009)
- General Rouge no Gaisen (2010)
- Shinzanmono (2010)
- The Legend of Yang Guifei (2010)
- Carnation (2011–2012)
- Hana Moyu (2015), Kaneko Tsuru
- The Emperor's Cook (2015), Okichi
- Miotsukushi Ryōrichō (2017)
- Half Blue Sky (2018)
- The Grand Family (2021), Yasuko Manpyō
- Trillion Game (2023), Mari Usami (ep. 8)
- Even Though We're Adults (2025), Yoriko
- Brothers in Arms (2026), Horiike Kinu
- Prodigies (2027), Kimiko

=== Radio ===
- Hideki Saijo Raspberry Club (1985–1986), Assistant MC
