= Ariel Loh =

Taiwanese American music producer, composer, and sound mixer

- Born: Cortlandt Manor, New York, U.S.
- Occupations: Music producer; Composer; Sound mixer
- Years active: 2012–present

Ariel Loh is a Taiwanese-American music producer, composer, and sound mixer who is transgender and works in the music and film industries.

== Life and career ==
Loh earned her Bachelor’s of Music in Studio Production from SUNY Purchase. She has contributed to projects featured on Billboard, Rolling Stone, BBC, NPR, Pitchfork, Vice, MTV, and streaming platforms such as Netflix, Hulu, Amazon, and Apple TV+. She releases ambient music under the production name Window Seat. Her productions include work with Yoke Lore on "Beige," which received an RIAA certification, the Harry Belafonte Best Song for Social Change Award for his song, "Deliver" during the 2025 Grammy Awards weekend. Ariel Loh is the first Asian-American transgender woman to win a Grammy.

In 2016, Loh scored Nicolas Pesce's debut feature film The Eyes of My Mother, with Variety noted "the buzzing synths and rattling winds of Loh’s alien-electro score" for their theatrical debut, along with other projects like Get Rolling With Otis on Apple TV+ and the upcoming film Visitation. She has also mixed projects including The Novice (2021), Expats (2024), and Terminator Zero (2024). Ariel Loh co-founded the Trans Music Archive, a nonprofit dedicated to archiving the contributions of transgender musicians on vinyl records.

== Discography ==
=== Selected Production Credits ===
- 2017 – Yoke Lore – "Good Pain" (EP)
- 2018 – Yoke Lore - "Absolutes" (EP)
- 2019 – Yoke Lore - "Meditations" (EP)
- 2020 – Gracie and Rachel - "Hello Weakness, You Make Me Strong" (LP)
- 2020 – Yoke Lore, Jax Anderson - "Sensitive Heart" (Single)
- 2021 – Yoke Lore - "Seeds" (Single)
- 2023 – Gracie and Rachel - "Nowhere Now Here" (EP)
- 2023 – Yoke Lore - "Toward A Never Ending Beginning" (LP)
- 2023 – Iman Jordan - "Odyssey" (Single)
- 2024 – Semler - "Saints Of Nevada" (Single)
- 2024 – Iman Jordan - "War" (Single)
- 2024 – Iman Jordan - "Deliver" (Single)

=== Selected Film and TV Scores ===
- 2016 – The Eyes of My Mother
- 2019 – Bei Bei
- 2021 – Get Rolling With Otis
- 2020 – Pink Skies Ahead
- TBA – Visitation
