= 69 (2004 film) =

2004 Japanese film directed by Lee Sang-il

- Japanese poster
- Directed by: Sang-il Lee
- Written by: Kankurō Kudō
- Based on: 69 by Ryū Murakami
- Produced by: Masatake Kondo
- Starring: Satoshi Tsumabuki; Masanobu Andō; Yuta Kanai; Asami Mizukawa
- Cinematography: Kōzō Shibasaki
- Edited by: Tsuyoshi Imai
- Music by: Masakazu Sakuma; Naoki Tachikawa
- Distributed by: Toei Company
- Release date: July 10, 2004 (Japan)
- Country: Japan
- Language: Japanese
- Box office: $4,551,540

69 is a 2004 Japanese film adaptation of Ryu Murakami's 1987 novel 69. The film was directed by Sang-il Lee.

== Plot ==
In Sasebo (on the Island of Kyushu, Southern Japan), in 1969, inspired by the iconoclastic examples of Dylan, Kerouac, Godard and Che, a band of mildly disaffected teenagers led by the smilingly charismatic Ken decide to shake up "the establishment", i.e., their repressive school and the nearby US military installation. A series of anarchic pranks meets with varying levels of success, until Ken and his friends focus their energies on mounting a multimedia "happening" to combine music, film and theater.

== Cast ==
- Satoshi Tsumabuki as Kensuke "Ken" Yazaki
- Masanobu Andō as Tadashi "Adama" Yamada
- Yuta Kanai as Manabu Iwase
- Asami Mizukawa as Mie Nagayama
- Rina Ohta as Kazuko "Lady Jane" Matsui
- Yoko Mitsuya as Yumi Sato
- Hirofumi Arai as Bancho
- Hideko Hara as Ken's mother
- Ittoku Kishibe as Matsunaga sensei
- Jun Kunimura as Sasaki
- Kyohei Shibata as Ken's father
- Kenny Scott as military officer

== Awards and nominations ==
- 47th Blue Ribbon Awards
  - 10 best Japanese movies (won)
  - Nominations: Best Director, Best Actor
- 29th Hochi Film Award for Best Actor (Satoshi Tsumabaki) (won)
- 19th Takasaki Film Festival: Best Supporting Actor Award (Kyohei Shibata) (won)

== Reception ==
A review on Asian Movie Pulse concluded, "“69” is not the best novel of Ryu Murakami neither the best film of Sang-il Lee, and the fact that a film about the 60's is stripped of any elements of nostalgia definitely works against it. However, through Tsumabuki's charisma, the in-your-face buffooness and the music ends up being entertaining and quite pleasant to both eyes and ears." while Variety stated, "Helmer Sang-il Lee, a third-generation Korean-Japanese, does a serviceable, if undistinctive, job in the director’s chair. Compared with other films based on the work of Murakami (Audition, Tokyo Decadence), this is considerably tamer fare. Perfs are likable but generic, and tech credits professional but uninspiring."
