= In the Miso Soup =

1997 novel by Ryu Murakami

- First edition
- Author: Ryu Murakami
- Original title: イン ザ・ミソスープ; In za Misosūpu
- Translator: Ralph McCarthy
- Language: Japanese
- Genre: Philosophical novel
- Publisher: Yomiuri Shimbun
- Publication date: 1997
- Publication place: Japan
- Media type: Print (Paperback)
- Pages: 192 pp (UK paperback edition), 216 pp (US paperback edition)
- ISBN: 0-14-303569-X (US); 0-74757-888-5 (UK)
- OCLC: 61520482
- Dewey Decimal: 895.6/35 22
- LC Class: PL856.U696 I513 2006
- Preceded by: Kyoko
- Followed by: Strange Days

In the Miso Soup (イン ザ・ミソスープ, In za Misosūpu) is a novel by Ryu Murakami. It was published over several months in Japanese throughout 1997 as a serialized feature in the Yomiuri Shimbun. In the same year, it was revised and republished as a book by Gentosha Bunko. The novel won the Yomiuri Prize for Fiction in 1997.

In 2003, the book was first translated and published in English.

== Plot summary ==
Twenty-year-old Kenji is a Japanese "nightlife" guide for foreigners—he navigates gaijin men around the sex clubs and hostess bars of Tokyo. On December 29 he receives a phone call from an American named Frank, who seeks three nights of his services. While Kenji has promised to spend more time with his girlfriend, sixteen-year-old Jun, the money is too good to pass up. He finds himself closing out the end of the year accompanying Frank around Shinjuku, wondering if his strange, plastic-skinned patron could be responsible for the gruesome events recently reported in the news.

== Themes ==
=== Structure ===
The novel has three chapters, each roughly coinciding with one night spent with Kenji's new customer, Frank.

=== Consumerism and Japanese culture ===
Kenji's time with Frank notes several American products or hotspots that Japanese people are apparently very familiar with, e.g. "Niketown," a large Nike department store in Manhattan which remained open until 2017.

While Kenji focuses on these consumerist details to reveal how Frank is suspicious, the third chapter revisits them to underscore how the specific characters were not only lonely, but dealing with their loneliness through unabated consumption. The antagonist, echoing the narrator, suggests that some foreigners are more knowledgeable about Japan and Japanese custom than actual Japanese people. In this regard, an English language review from Dr. Yoshiko Yokochi Samuel starkly notes: "The entire final chapter, in which the twin themes are highlighted in a static, no-action setting, is, in fact, the weakest part of this otherwise effective horror story." The themes Samuel notes are the "miso soup" metaphor and criticisms of contemporary Japan.

== Characters ==
=== Major characters ===
- Kenji: A nightlife guide based in Tokyo. He is an average English speaker who specializes in touring foreigners through Kabuki-cho. As mentioned, Kenji is the narrator of the story.
- Frank: An American tourist who contracts Kenji's services. Frank disturbs Kenji from the outset, and is the antagonist.

=== Minor characters ===
- Asami/Madoka: A "special services" hostess at a peep show.
- Jun: Kenji's sixteen year-old girlfriend.
- Maki: Female patron/prostitute at the omiai pub. She claims to not be a prostitute, but also claims to be a high price call girl.
- Noriko: A tout for the omiai pub and former juvenile delinquent.
- Reika and Rie: Two lingerie pub hostesses.
- Satoshi: A lingerie club barker and acquaintance of Kenji's.
- Yokoyama: Publisher of Tokyo Pink Guide. The only publication Kenji advertises in, and Frank's sex industry bible.
- Yuko: Female patron/prostitute at the omiai pub. She is seated with Frank, Kenji, and Maki.
