= Ryū Murakami =

Japanese writer and filmmaker (1952–2026)

- 村上 龍
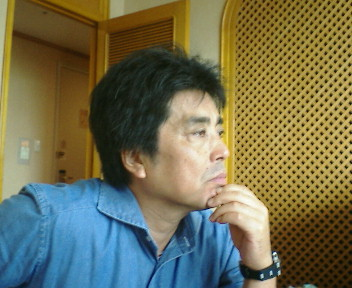
- Ryū Murakami in 2005
- Born: Ryūnosuke Murakami (村上龍之助, Murakami Ryūnosuke); 19 February 1952; Sasebo, Nagasaki, Japan
- Died: 17 October 2026 (aged 74); Tokyo, Japan
- Occupations: Novelist; essayist; filmmaker
- Writing career
- Notable works: Almost Transparent Blue; Coin Locker Babies; 69; Piercing; In the Miso Soup
- Movement: Postmodernism

Ryū Murakami (村上 龍, Murakami Ryū; 19 February 1952 – 17 October 2026) was a Japanese novelist, essayist and filmmaker. His novels explore human nature through themes of disillusion, drug use, surrealism, murder and war, set against the dark backdrop of Japan. His best known novels are Almost Transparent Blue, Audition, Coin Locker Babies, and In the Miso Soup.

== Life and career ==
Murakami was born Ryūnosuke Murakami (村上龍之助, Murakami Ryūnosuke) in Sasebo, Nagasaki, on 19 February 1952. The name Ryūnosuke derived from the protagonist in Daibosatsu-tōge, a work of fiction by Kaizan Nakazato.

During his high school years in Sasebo, he joined a rock band called Coelacanth as its drummer. In the summer of his third year in high school, Murakami and his classmates barricaded the school's rooftop, inspired by the university student protests then taking place across Japan, and were placed under house arrest for three months. During this time, he was exposed to hippie culture, which would exert a strong influence on him.

After graduating from high school in 1970, Murakami formed another rock band and produced 8-millimeter indie films. He enrolled in the silkscreen department at Gendaishichosha School of Art in Tokyo, but dropped out in the first year. In October 1972, he moved to Fussa, Tokyo, and was admitted to the sculpture program at Musashino Art University. He married a keyboard player in the 1970s, and their son was born in 1980.

In the early 1990s, during the Special Period, Ryū Murakami promoted and supported Cuban music in Japan, especially after meeting José Luis Cortés (NG La Banda) in Havana. He established Murakami’s label within Sony Music and produced recordings by Cuban musicians. His work for twenty years with Cuban musicians contributed to Cuban music recognition in Japan.

Murakami started up e-magazine JMM (Japan Mail Media) in 1999 and served as the publication's chief editor. From 2006 on, he also hosted with Eiko Koike a talk show that focused on business and finance called Kanburia Kyuden, broadcast on TV Tokyo. That same year, he started up a video streaming service, RVR (Ryu's Video Report). In 2010, he founded a company, G2010, to sell and produce eBooks.

Ryū Murakami died at his home in Tokyo on 17 October 2026, at the age of 74. His death was announced by his publisher Gentosha on 23 October.

== Works ==
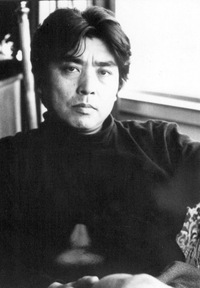

Murakami's first work of fiction was the short novel Almost Transparent Blue, written while he was still a university student. It deals with promiscuity and drug use among disaffected youth. Critically acclaimed as a new style of literature, it won the Gunzo Prize for New Writers in 1976, despite objections to its portrayal of decadence. Later that same year, it won the Akutagawa Prize, and became a bestseller.

In 1980, Murakami published a much longer novel, Coin Locker Babies, again, to critical acclaim, and won the Noma Literary New Face Prize. Coin Locker Babies became popular among Japan's punks and other alienated youth. The autobiographical novel 69 followed, and then Ai to Gensō no Fascism (1987) was released. The novel's plotline revolves around the struggle to reform Japan's survival-of-the-fittest society with a secret "Hunting Society". His subsequent novel Topaz (1988) concerns a sado-masochistic woman's radical expression of her sexuality.

A nominee for the 30th Tanizaki Prize, Murakami's The World in Five Minutes From Now (1994) was written from the perspective of a parallel universe version of Japan. In 1996, he expanded his autobiography 69, and released the Murakami Ryū Movie and Novel Collection. He also won the Taiko Hirabayashi Prize. That same year, he wrote Topaz II, a novel about a high school girl who engages in "compensated dating". Anime director Hideaki Anno later adapted the novel as the live-action film Love & Pop. Murakami's Popular Hits of the Showa Era concerns the escalating firepower in a battle between social outcasts: five teenage boys versus five middle-aged women. Literary scholar Barbara Greene suggests that the text reveals how "the invisible violence of post-Bubble Japan's social order is made explicit through a low-stakes, yet hyperviolent, guerilla war undertaken by a set of ludicrous and narcissistic characters whose increasingly deadly attacks are met with public indifference. Within the consumer-capitalist social order, personal satisfaction is the paramount goal..."

In the Miso Soup, a psychological thriller novel set in Tokyo's Kabuki-cho red-light district, was released in 1997. The novel won the Yomiuri Prize for Fiction that year. Thereafter, Parasites (Kyōsei chū, 2000), a novel about a young hikikomori fascinated by war, won the 36th Tanizaki Prize. That same year, Exodus from the Land of Hope (Kibō no Kuni no Exodus) was released. The novel centers on junior high school students, who create a new society through the internet to replace the normalized Japanese one in which they no longer wish to be engaged.

In 2001, Murakami became involved with his friend Ryuichi Sakamoto's group NML No More Landmines, that sets out to remove landmines from former battle sites around the world.

In 2004, Murakami announced the publication of 13 Year Old Hello Work, aimed at increasing interest among young adults who are entering the workforce. Hantō wo Deyo (2005) is about an invasion of Japan by North Korea. It won him the Noma Liberal Arts Prize and Mainichi Publishing Culture Award.

The novel Audition was made into a feature film by Takashi Miike. Murakami reportedly liked it so much he gave Miike his blessing to adapt Coin Locker Babies into a film. Jordan Galland worked on the screenplay for Coin Locker Babies, but Miike's fundraising efforts for the film proved inadequate.

In 2011, Utau Kujira won the Mainichi Art Award.

== Selected bibliography ==
=== Novels ===
Year	Japanese Title	English Title	Notes
1976	Kagirinaku Tōmei ni Chikai Burū (限りなく透明に近いブルー)	Almost Transparent Blue	English translation by Nancy Andrew
1977	Umi no Mukō de Sensō ga Hajimaru (海の向こうで戦争が始まる)	War Begins Beyond the Sea	French translation by Claude Okamoto
1980	Koinrokkā Beibīzu (コインロッカー・ベイビーズ)	Coin Locker Babies	English translation by Stephen Snyder, republished by Pushkin Press, 2013
1983	Daijōbu mai furendo (だいじょうぶマイ・フレンド)	All Right, My Friend	
1985	Tenisu Bōi no Yūutsu (テニスボーイの憂鬱)	Melancholy of Tennis Boy	
1987	69 Shikusuti Nain	69	English translation by Ralph F. McCarthy, published by Pushkin Press, 2013
1987	Ai to Gensō no Fasizumu (愛と幻想のファシズム)	Fascism of Love and Fantasy	
1989	Raffuruzu Hoteru (ラッフルズホテル)	Raffles Hotel	French translation by Corinne Atlan
1991	Kokkusakkā Burūsu (コックサッカーブルース)	Cocksucker Blues	
1991	Chōdendō Naito Kurabu (超電導ナイトクラブ)	Superconduction Nightclub	
1992	Ibisa (イビサ)	Ibiza	
1992	Nagasaki Oranda Mura (長崎オランダ村)	Nagasaki Holland Village	
1993	Ekusutashī (エクスタシー)	Ecstasy	French translation by Sylvain Cardonnel
1993	Fijī no Kobito (フィジーの小人)	Fijian Midget	
1993	Sanbyakurokujūhachi Yādo Pā Fō Dai Ni Da (368Y Par4 第2打)	368Y Par4 the 2nd shot	
1993	Ongaku no Kaigan (音楽の海岸)	The seashore of the music	
1994	Shōwa Kayō Daizenshū (昭和歌謡大全集)	Popular Hits of the Showa Era: A Novel	English translation by Ralph F. McCarthy. Published by Pushkin Press, 2013
1994	Gofungo no Sekai (五分後の世界)	The World in Five Minutes From Now	
1994	Piasshingu (ピアッシング)	Piercing	English translation by Ralph F. McCarthy. Published in English January 2007.
1995	KYOKO	Kyoko	French translation by Corinne Atlan
1996	Hūga Uirusu Gofungo no Sekai Tū (ヒュウガ・ウイルス 五分後の世界II)	Hūga Virus: The World in Five Minutes From Now II	
1996	Merankoria (メランコリア)	Melancholia	French translation by Sylvain Cardonnel
1996	Rabu ando Poppu Topāzu Tū (ラブ&ポップ トパーズII)	Love & Pop: Topaz II	French translation by Sylvain Cardonnel
1997	Ōdishon (オーディション)	Audition	English translation by Ralph McCarthy. Spanish translation by J.C. Cortés.
1997	Sutorenji Deizu (ストレンジ・デイズ)	Strange Days	
1997	In za Misosūpu (イン ザ・ミソスープ)	In the Miso Soup	English translation by Ralph F. McCarthy. Published in English 2005.
1997	In za Misosūpu (イン ザ・ミソスープ)	In the Miso Soup	French translation ("Miso Soup") by Corinne Atlan. Published in French January 2003.
1998	Rain (ライン)	Lines	French translation ("Lignes") by Sylvain Cardonnel, Czech translation ("Čáry") by Jan Levora.
2000	Kyōsei Chū (共生虫)	Parasites	French translation by Sylvain Cardonnel
2000	Kibō no Kuni no Ekusodasu (希望の国のエクソダス)	Exodus from the Land of Hope	
2001	Tanatosu (タナトス)	Thanatos	French translation by Patrick Honnoré
2001	THE MASK CLUB	The Mask Club	
2001	Saigo no Kazoku (最後の家族)	The Last Family	
2005	Hantō o Deyo (半島を出よ)	From the Fatherland, with Love	Translated into English by Ralph McCarthy, Charles De Wolf and Ginny Tapley Takemori, published by Pushkin Press, 2013
2010	歌うクジラ	A Singing Whale	
2011	Kokoro wa Anata no Motoni (心はあなたのもとに)	My Love is Beneath You	
2015	Ōrudo Terorisuto (オールド・テロリスト)	Old Terrorist	
2020	MISSING Ushinawa Rete Iru Mono (MISSING 失われているもの)		

=== Short story collections ===
Year	Japanese Title	English Title	Notes
1984	Kanashiki Nettai (悲しき熱帯)	Tropical Sad	reissued under the new title of "Summer in the city" in 1988.
1986	Posuto Poppu Āto no aru Heya (POST ポップアートのある部屋)	POST, Room with Pop Art	
1986	Hashire! Takahashi (走れ！タカハシ)	Run! Takahashi	a series of novels about one baseball player
1986	ニューヨーク・シティ・マラソン	New York City Marathon	
1988	Topāzu (トパーズ)	Topaz	
1988	Murakami Ryū Ryōri Shōsetsushū (村上龍料理小説集)	The collection of the Ryū Murakami dish novels	
1991	Koi wa itsumo Michina mono (恋はいつも未知なもの)	Love is always strange	
1995	Murakami Ryū Eiga Shōsetsushū (村上龍映画小説集)	The collection of the Ryū Murakami movie novels	
1996	Monika – Ongakuka no Yume Shōsetsuka no Monogatari (モニカ-音楽家の夢・小説家の物語)	Monica – Dream of a musician, story of a novelist	Joint work with Ryuichi Sakamoto
1997	Hakuchō (白鳥)	Swan	
1998	Wain Ippai dake no Shinjitsu (ワイン一杯だけの真実)	Truth of a cup of wine	
2003	Tōku Hanarete Soba ni ite (とおくはなれてそばにいて)		
2003	Dokonidemo aru Basho Dokonimo inai Watashi (どこにでもある場所どこにもいないわたし)		renamed to Kūkō nite (空港にて; at the airport) in the paperback edition
2007	Tokkenteki Jōjin Bishoku Murakami Ryū Ryōri & Kannō Shōsetsushū (特権的情人美食 村上龍料理&官能小説集)	The privileged mistress gastronomy: The collection of Ryū Murakami dish & sensuality novels	
2012	Gojūgo-sai kara no Harōraifu (55歳からのハローライフ)	Hello Life from 55 years old	
2016		Tokyo Decadence: 15 Stories	A collection of stories from several of Murakami's story collections, translated by Ralph McCarthy. Spanish translation by J.C. Cortés

=== English short stories ===
Year	Japanese Title	English Title	Notes
2004		It's Been Just a Year and a Half Now Since I Went with My Boss to That Bar	short story published in Zoetrope: All-Story (Vol. 8, No. 4, 2004). English translation by Ralph McCarthy.
2005		I am a Novelist	short story published in The New Yorker (Jan. 3, 2005). English translation by Ralph McCarthy
2009		At the Airport	short story in Zoetrope All-Story (Vol. 13, No. 2, 2009). English translation by Ralph McCarthy.
2010		No Matter How Many Times I Read Your Confession, There's One Thing I Just Don't Understand: Why Didn't You Kill the Woman?	Zoetrope All-Story (Vol. 14, No. 4, 2010).
2011		Penlight	Zoetrope All-Story (Vol. 15, No. 3, 2011). English translation by Ralph McCarthy.

=== Non-fiction and essays ===
Year	Japanese Title	English Title	Notes
1985	Amerikan Dorīmu (アメリカン★ドリーム)	American Dream	
1987	Subete no Otoko wa Shōmōhin de aru (すべての男は消耗品である。)	Every Man is a Consumable	Vol.1–11 (1987–2010)
1991	Murakami Ryū zen essei 1976–1981 (村上龍全エッセイ 1976–1981)	All the Ryū Murakami essays 1976–1981	
1991	Murakami Ryū zen essei 1982–1986 (村上龍全エッセイ 1982–1986)	All the Ryū Murakami essays 1982–1986	
1991	Murakami Ryū zen essei 1987–1991 (村上龍全エッセイ 1987–1991)	All the Ryū Murakami essays 1987–1991	
1992	Ryū gen higo (龍言飛語)		
1993	"Futsū no onna no ko" to shite sonzaishitakunai anata e. (「普通の女の子」として存在したくないあなたへ。)	To you who don't want to exist as "an ordinary girl."	
1996	Anata ga inakunatta ato no Tōkyō monogatari (あなたがいなくなった後の東京物語)	Tokyo Story after you go away	
1998	Samishī koku no satsujin (寂しい国の殺人)	Murder in a lonely country	
1998	Fijikaru intenshiti (フィジカル・インテンシティ)	Physical Intensity	Vol.1-5 (1998–2002)
1999	Samishī koku kara haruka wārudo sakkā e (寂しい国から遥かなるワールドサッカーへ)	From the Lonely country to far-off world soccer	
2000	Dare ni demo de kiru renai (誰にでもできる恋愛)	The love that anyone can do	
2001	Dame na onna (ダメな女)	Useless Woman	
2002	Damesarenai tameni, watashi wa keizai manda Murakami Ryū Weekly Report (だまされないために、わたしは経済を学んだ 村上龍weekly report)	I studied economics so as not to be deceived: Ryū Murakami weekly report	
2002	Renai no Kakusa (恋愛の格差)	Involuntary celibacy	
2002	Makuro Nihon keizai kara mikuro anata jishin e Murakami Ryū Weekly Report (マクロ・日本経済からミクロ・あなた自身へ 村上龍weekly report)	From macro, Japanese economy to micro, yourself: Ryū Murakami weekly report	
2003	Jisatsu yori wa SEX Murakami Ryū no Renai Jōsei ron (自殺よりはSEX 村上龍の恋愛・女性論)	SEX is better than Suicide: Ryū Murakami's theory of love and woman	
2006	Watashi wa amaete iru no deshō ka? 27 sai OL (わたしは甘えているのでしょうか？27歳・OL)	Am I spoiling myself? 27 years old, female office worker	
2006	Murakami Ryū bungaku teki essei shū (村上龍文学的エッセイ集)	The collection of Ryū Murakami literary essays	
2007	Angai, kaimono suki (案外、買い物好き)	Unexpectedly, I'm a shopping lover	
2008	Sore de mo watashi wa koi ga shitai kōfuku ni naritai okane mo hoshī (それでもわたしは、恋がしたい 幸福になりたい お金も欲しい)	Still I want to love, want to be happy, and also want money	
2009	Mushumi no susume (無趣味のすすめ)	Encouragement of having no hobby	
2010	Nigeru chuukōnen, yokubō no nai wakamonotachi (逃げる中高年、欲望のない若者たち)	Old and middle age who run away, youths with few wants	
2012	Sakura no ki no shita niwa gareki ga uzumatte iru. (櫻の樹の下には瓦礫が埋まっている)	Debris is buried under the cherry tree.	

=== Interviews and letters ===
Year	Japanese Title	English Title	Notes
1977	中上健次vs村上龍 俺たちの船は、動かぬ霧の中を、纜を解いて	Kenji Nakagami vs Ryū Murakami: Our ship unmoors in a stagnant fog	with Kenji Nakagami
1981	ウォーク・ドント・ラン 村上龍VS村上春樹 Wōku donto ran Murakami Ryū vs Murakami Haruki	Walk, Don't Run: Ryū Murakami vs Haruki Murakami	with Haruki Murakami
1985	EV.Cafe 超進化論	EV.Cafe ultra-Darwinism	with Ryuichi Sakamoto
1992	友よ、また逢おう	See you, my friend	Ryū Murakami = Ryuichi Sakamoto letters
1994	村上龍＋椹木野衣 最新対論 神は細部に宿る	Ryū Murakami + Noi Sawaragi Latest Discussion: God is in the details	with Noi Sawaragi
1999	村上龍対談集 存在の耐えがたきサルサ	Ryū Murakami interview collection: The Unbearable Salsa of Being	
2006	「個」を見つめるダイアローグ 村上壟X伊藤穣一	Dialogue to stare at "individual": Ryū Murakami X Joichi Ito	

=== Picture books ===
Year	Japanese Title	English Title	Notes
1983	絵本 だいじょうぶマイ・フレンド	Picture book: All Right, My Friend	Illustrator: Katsu Yoshida
1989	友達のラ リ ル レ ロ		Illustrator: Sumako Yasui
1996	絵物語・永遠の一瞬 すてきなジェニファー	Wonderful Jennifer	Illustrator: Yoko Yamamoto
1999	あの金で何が買えたか バブル・ファンタジー	What were we able to buy with that money?: Bubble Fantasy	Illustrator: Yuka Hamano
2000	ストレイト・ストーリー	The Straight Story	picture book of the movie (director: David Lynch) of the same title, Illustrator: Yuka Hamano
2001	おじいさんは山へ金儲けに 時として、投資は希望を生む	The old man goes to the mountain for money-making. The investment occasionally produces hope.	Illustrator: Yuka Hamano
2003	13歳のハローワーク	Hello Work for 13 years old	Illustrator: Yuka Hamano
2003	ポストマン	Postman	Illustrator: Yuka Hamano
	シールド（盾）	Shield	Illustrator: Yuka Hamano

== Filmography ==
Year	Japanese Title	English Title	Role	Director
1979	限りなく透明に近いブルー; Kagirinaku tōmei ni chikai burū	Almost Transparent Blue	Novel, Scriptwriter, Director	Ryū Murakami
1983	だいじょうぶマイ・フレンド; Daijōbu mai furendo	All Right, My Friend	Novel, Scriptwriter, Director	Ryū Murakami
1989	ラッフルズホテル; Raffuruzu Hoteru	Raffles Hotel	Novel, Director	Ryū Murakami
1992	トパーズ; Topāzu	Topaz a.k.a. Tokyo Decadence	Novel, Scriptwriter, Director	Ryū Murakami
1996	ラブ＆ポップ; Rabu & Poppu	Love & Pop	Novel	Hideaki Anno
1999	オーディション; Ōdishon	Audition	Novel	Takashi Miike
2000	KYOKO	Because of You	Novel, Scriptwriter, Director	Ryū Murakami
2001	走れ！イチロー; Hashire! Ichirō	Run! Ichiro	Novel	Kazuki Ōmori
2003	昭和歌謡大全集; Shōwa kayō daizenshū	Karaoke Terror: The Complete Japanese Showa Songbook	Novel	Tetsuo Shinohara
2004	シクスティナイン; Shikusutinain	69	Novel	Lee Sang-il
2006	ポプラル！ Popuraru!	Popular!	Executive Producer	Jen Paz
2018	ピアッシング Piasshingu	Piercing	Novel	Nicolas Pesce

=== Produced albums (Murakami’s label) ===
Year	Title	Artist	Notes
1992	Nueva Generación	NG La Banda	
1993	Cabaret Panorámico / Échale Limón	NG La Banda	
1993	Live in Japan	NG La Banda	Recorded live in Tokyo
1993	No Hace Falta Pensar La Muerte	Paulo y Su Elite	
1994	La Bruja	NG La Banda	
1995–1996	KYOKO Original Sound Track	Various Artists	Film soundtrack
