= Sawaki =

Sawaki (written: 沢木 or 澤木 lit. "swamp tree") is a Japanese surname. Notable people with the surname include:

- Ikuya Sawaki (沢木 郁也; born 1951), Japanese voice actor
- Keisuke Sawaki (澤木 啓祐; born 1943), Japanese long-distance runner
- Kōdō Sawaki (沢木 興道; 1880–1965), Japanese Zen Buddhist
- Tetsu Sawaki (沢木 哲; born 1982), Japanese actor

The surname Sawaki (written: 沢木 or 澤木) combines the kanji sawa (沢 or 澤), meaning "swamp" or "marsh," with ki (木), meaning "tree" or "wood," suggesting a geographic origin related to wetland forests.

== Fictional characters ==
- Tadayasu Souemon Sawaki (沢木 惣右衛門 直保), protagonist of the manga series Moyashimon
- Momoe Sawaki (沢木桃恵), a character in Wonder Egg Priority
- Shuichiro Sawaki (沢木修一郎), a character in Wonder Egg Priority
