= Isla Johnston =

British actress

- Occupation: Actress
- Years active: 2018-present
- Television: The Queen's Gambit

Isla Johnston is a British television and film actress. She began her career as a child actress, and appeared as the Young Beth in the Netflix miniseries The Queen's Gambit (2020). She was named a 2026 Screen International Star of Tomorrow.

== Early life ==
Johnston grew up in Suffolk, England. She lived on a farm which grew wheat, barley, grapeseed and sugar beet. Her mother had previously worked as a model, and her father works in IT. She has a younger brother. Her first acting role was as Lady Macbeth for Shakespeare Schools Theatre Festival, at Gislingham Primary School as a ten year-old. After appearing in acting roles, Johnston returned to school to finish her A-Levels, including art history and history and gaining an A* in drama.

== Career ==
Johnston began acting in 2018, with her first role in the Channel 4 miniseries Kiri. She also made an appearance on the long running BBC One series Doctors. She played a younger version of the character Beth Harmon, played by Anya Taylor-Joy, in 2020 Netflix series The Queen's Gambit.

In 2021, she could be seen the role of Lucy Spencer in the Apple TV+ original series Invasion. In 2022, she appeared in BBC Two series Life After Life playing the younger version of the character Ursula, played by Thomasin McKenzie. In 2023, she was cast in a lead role in the Nicolas Pesce horror film Visitation, alongside Olivia Cooke.

In 2025, she could be seen alongside Nicolas Cage in The Carpenter's Son, her performance described in The Times as "captivating" as a vulnerable female Satan, “one of the great screen Satans…an easy match for Robert De Niro in Angel Heart. That year, she was cast in the lead role by Baz Luhrman in an upcoming biographical film about Joan of Arc.

== Filmography ==
Key
†	Denotes works that have not yet been released

Year	Title	Role	Notes
2018	Kiri	Fiona	1 episode
2019	Doctors	Sarah Kemp	1 episode
2020	The Queen's Gambit	Young Beth	4 episodes
2021	Invasion	Lucy Spencer	4 episodes
2022	Life After Life	Young Ursula	4 episodes
2025	The Carpenter's Son	The Stranger	Film
TBA	Visitation†		Post-production
