= For Mrs. =

Japanese manga magazine

- Categories: Josei manga
- Frequency: Monthly
- Circulation: 150,000 (Oct. 2009 – Sept. 2010)
- First issue: December 1986; 39 years ago
- Company: Akita Shoten
- Country: Japan
- Based in: Tokyo
- Language: Japanese
- Website: akitashoten.co.jp/formrs

For Mrs. (Japanese: フォアミセス, Hepburn: Foa Misesu) is a monthly Japanese josei manga magazine published by Akita Shoten on the third of each month. First issued in December 1986, it is aimed at adult women and tends to feature stories on child-rearing and families. A spin-off magazine, For Mrs. Special, launched in August 1994 and is published quarterly by Akita Shoten.

== Serializations ==
- Inochi no Utsuwa by Kimiko Uehara (1991–present)
- With the Light: Raising an Autistic Child by Keiko Tobe (2000–2010)
- Shiawase wa Tabete Nete Mate by Tori Mizunagi (2020–present)

== Circulation ==
For Mrs. had a circulation of 150,000 from 1 October 2009 to 30 September 2010.
