= Mari-chan =

Japanese manga

まりちゃん
- Manga

Āi! Mari-chan ハーイ!まりちゃん
- Written by: Kimiko Uehara
- Volumes: 2
- Manga

Lovely Mari-chan ラブリーまりちゃん
- Written by: Kimiko Uehara
- Original run: 1984 – 1989
- Volumes: 7
- Manga

Happy Mari-chan ハッピーまりちゃん
- Written by: Kimiko Uehara
- Volumes: 7
- Manga

Āi! Mari-chan Ai no Etowāru ハーイ!まりちゃん 愛のエトワール
- Written by: Kimiko Uehara
- Volumes: 7
- Manga

銀のトウシューズ
- Written by: Kimiko Uehara
- Volumes: 6
- Manga

白鳥の歌
- Written by: Kimiko Uehara
- Volumes: 4

Mari-chan (まりちゃん) is a Japanese manga series by Kimiko Uehara. It won the 35th Shogakukan Manga Award for Children's manga.
