= Almost Transparent Blue =

1976 novel by Ryū Murakami

- Front cover of the 1st ed. English trade paperback (1981)
- Author: Ryū Murakami
- Original title: 限りなく透明に近いブルー
- Translator: Nancy Andrew
- Language: Japanese
- Genre: Postmodern novel
- Publisher: Kodansha International (JPN)
- Publication date: 1976 (1st edition)
- Publication place: Japan
- Media type: Print (Hardcover)
- Pages: 126 (English 1st ed. hardcover 1977)
- ISBN: 0-87011-305-4 (English 1st ed. hardcover 1977)
- OCLC: 3753849
- Dewey Decimal: 895.6/35 19
- LC Class: PL856.U696 K313 1977

Almost Transparent Blue (限りなく透明に近いブルー, Kagirinaku Tōmei ni Chikai Burū; "Almost Infinitely Transparent Blue") is a 1976 novel, written by Japanese author Ryū Murakami, that features a portrait of narrator Ryū and his friends trapped in a cycle of sex, drugs and rock 'n roll during the 1970s.

== Plot ==
Narrated by the main character Ryū, the novel focuses on his small group of young friends in the mid-1970s. Living in a Japanese town with an American air force base, their lives revolve around sex, drugs and rock 'n roll.

The near-plotless story weaves a vividly raw, image-intensive journey through the daily monotony of drug-induced hallucinations, vicious acts of violence, overdoses, suicide, and group sex.

== Characters ==
- Ryū – Narrator. 19-year-old substance abuser.
- Lilly – Ryū's prostitute friend and casual sex partner.
- Reiko – Okinawan friend of Ryū and girlfriend of Okinawa.
- Okinawa – drug-addicted Okinawan friend of Ryū and boyfriend of Reiko.
- Yoshiyama – Unemployed junkie friend of Ryū and abusive boyfriend of Kei.
- Kei – Friend of Ryū and girlfriend of Yoshiyama.
- Kazuo – Male friend of Ryū.
- Moko – Substance abuser friend of Ryū.
- Jackson – African American Airman at the local AFB, he arranges for group sex escapades between his base comrades and Ryū's group.

== Reception and legacy ==
Murakami submitted the novel to the literary magazine Gunzo's debutant contest, in which it won the first prize. It also won the prestigious Akutagawa Prize the same year. The title of rock band Luna Sea's song "Blue Transparency -Almost Transparent Blue-" (BLUE TRANSPARENCY 限りなく 透明に 近い ブルー), off their 1991 self-titled debut album, is a reference to the novel.

== Film adaptation ==
26-year-old Murakami made his directorial debut with a film adaptation of his novel Almost Transparent Blue, which he also scripted. It was released in Japan on March 3, 1979, and was distributed by Toho. Hidenori Taga and Kei Ijisato under Kitty Records produced the film, starring Kunihiko Mitamura (Ryu), Mari Nakayama (Lilly), Haruhiko Saitô (Yoshiyama), Keiko Wakasa (Kei), Narumi Tokura (Reiko), Yuri Takase (Moko), Goro Masaki (Kazuo), Togo Igawa (Okinawa) and Akiko Nakamura (Mari).

== English-language editions ==
- Ryū Murakami, Almost Transparent Blue (Kagirinaku tōmei ni chikai burū), translated by Nancy Andrew, 1st hardback ed., Tokyo; New York : Kodansha International : Distributed by Kodansha International/USA through Harper & Row, 1977, 126 pages. Tokyo; New York : Kodansha International : Distributed by Kodansha International/USA through Harper & Row, 1977, 126 p. ISBN 0-87011-305-4
- Ryū Murakami, Almost Transparent Blue, translated by Nancy Andrew, 1st paperback ed., Tokyo; New York : Kodansha International, 1981 (reissue, 1992), 126 p. ISBN 0-87011-469-7
- Ryū Murakami, Almost Transparent Blue, translated by Nancy Andrew, 1st trade paperback ed., New York : Kodansha America, 2003, 128 p. ISBN 4-7700-2904-7

== Censorship ==
In August 2025, the Lukashenko regime added the book to the List of printed publications containing information messages and materials, the distribution of which could harm the national interests of Belarus.
