= Shiawase wa Tabete Nete Mate =

Japanese manga series

- First tankōbon volume cover, featuring Satoko Mugimaki

しあわせは食べて寝て待て
- Genre: Slice of life
- Manga
- Written by: Tori Mizunagi
- Published by: Akita Shoten
- Imprint: ALC DX
- Magazine: For Mrs.
- Original run: February 3, 2020 – present
- Volumes: 6
- Television drama
- Directed by: Ryōhei Nakano; Kenji Tanaka; Takashi Uchida
- Written by: Ryōko Kuwahara; Saeki Nejime
- Music by: Nobuyuki Nakajima
- Studio: NHK Enterprises
- Original network: NHK General TV
- Original run: April 1, 2025 – May 27, 2025
- Episodes: 9

Shiawase wa Tabete Nete Mate (しあわせは食べて寝て待て) is a Japanese manga series written and illustrated by Tori Mizunagi. It began serialization in Akita Shoten's josei manga magazine For Mrs. in February 2020. A live-action television drama adaptation aired between April and May 2025.

== Synopsis ==
Satoko Mugimaki is a 38-year-old woman who suffers from an immune system disorder which forces her to quit her previous job, and work in an office on a part-time basis at four days a week. Satoko later moves into a new apartment, and meets and befriends the landlady Suzu Miyama. Suzu notices that Satoko has health problems and volunteers to help her get better. Soon Satoko meets other people in her new neighborhood, and finds that it helps raise her spirits as she deals with her reoccurring health problems.

== Characters ==
Satoko Mugimaki (麦巻さとこ, Mugimaki Satoko)
Portrayed by: Yuki Sakurai
Suzu Miyama (美山鈴, Miyama Suzu)
Portrayed by: Mariko Kaga
Tsukasa Hajiro (羽白司, Hajiro Tsukasa)
Portrayed by: Hio Miyazawa
Keiichirō Tō (唐圭一郎, Tō Keiichirō)
Portrayed by: Seiji Fukushi
Otome Aoba (青葉乙女, Aoba Otome)
Portrayed by: Tomoko Tabata
Hiroki Mashiko (マシコヒロキ, Mashiko Hiroki)
Portrayed by: Yuto Nakayama
Chiharu Tomoezawa (巴沢千春, Tomoezawa Chiharu)
Portrayed by: Aoi Okuyama
Riku Sorihashi (反橋りく, Sorihashi Riku)
Portrayed by: Kie Kitano
Hitoshi Yatsugashira (八つ頭仁志, Yatsugashira Hitoshi)
Portrayed by: Jun Nishiyama
Natsuki Kōma (高麗なつき, Kōma Natsuki)
Portrayed by: Shiori Doi
Yumi Mejiro (目白弓, Mejiro Yumi)
Portrayed by: Hinano Nakayama
Keiko Mugimaki (麦巻惠子, Mugimaki Keiko)
Portrayed by: Mayumi Asaka

== Media ==
=== Manga ===
Written and illustrated by Tori Mizunagi, Shiawase wa Tabete Nete Mate began serialization in Akita Shoten's josei manga magazine For Mrs. on February 3, 2020. Its chapters have been collected in six tankōbon volumes as of October 2025.

No.	Release date	ISBN
1	April 16, 2021	978-4-253-16082-7
2	November 16, 2021	978-4-253-16083-4
3	October 14, 2022	978-4-253-16084-1
4	September 14, 2023	978-4-253-16085-8
5	November 15, 2024	978-4-253-16396-5
6	October 16, 2025	978-4-253-00428-2

=== Drama ===
A live-action television drama adaptation aired on NHK General TV from April 1, to May 27, 2025. The drama starred Yuki Sakurai, Mariko Kaga, Hio Miyazawa in lead roles, and Seiji Fukushi, Tomoko Tabata, Kie Kitano, and Mayumi Asaka among others in supporting roles. A television special is set to premiere on NHK General TV in Q3 2026.

== Reception ==
The series was ranked eighth in the 2022 edition of Takarajimasha's Kono Manga ga Sugoi! guidebook list of best manga for female readers. The series was ranked ninth in the 2025 Da Vinci Book of the Year ranking.
