= Visitation (film) =

Irish horror film

- Directed by: Nicolas Pesce
- Screenplay by: Helen Gaughran
- Produced by: David Lancaster; Stephanie Wilcox; Katie Holly; Jillian Share; Courtney Cunniff; Chanel Vidal
- Starring: Olivia Cooke; Alfie Allen; Penelope Wilton; Stephen Rea; Isla Johnston
- Cinematography: Zachary Galler
- Music by: Ariel Loh
- Production companies: Entertainment One; Rumble Films; Keeper Pictures
- Country: Ireland
- Language: English

Visitation is an upcoming Irish horror film directed by Nicolas Pesce and written by Helen Gaughran. It stars Olivia Cooke, Isla Johnston and Alfie Allen.

== Premise ==
With her mother sick, a teenage girl is sent away to live in a nunnery.

== Cast ==
- Olivia Cooke
- Alfie Allen
- Penelope Wilton
- Stephen Rea
- Isla Johnston

== Production ==
The film is directed by Nicolas Pesce and written by Helen Gaughran with Zachary Galler as director of photography. Entertainment One, Rumble Films, and Blinder Films are producers on the film with David Lancaster and Stephanie Wilcox serving as producers for Rumble Films alongside Keeper Pictures' Katie Holly, and Jillian Share, Courtney Cunniff, and Chanel Vidal for eOne.

The cast is led by Olivia Cooke and also includes Alfie Allen, Penelope Wilton, Stephen Rea and Isla Johnston.

Principal photography took place in January and February 2023 in Dublin and County Meath in the Republic of Ireland.
