= Chong (film) =

2000 film by Lee Sang-il

Blue – Chong
- DVD cover
- Directed by: Sang-il Lee
- Written by: Sang-il Lee
- Produced by: Shigeki Chiba
- Starring: Mashima Hidekazu; Ryujin Yamamoto; Shiho Takemoto; Naohiro Ariyama; Tsutomu Yuzawa
- Cinematography: Shin Hayasaka
- Edited by: Chieko Takiguchi
- Production company: Pia Production
- Distributed by: Pia Film Festival
- Release date: April 21, 2001 (Japan)
- Running time: 54 minutes
- Country: Japan
- Language: Japanese

Blue – Chong (Japanese: 青〜chong〜), also known as Chong, is a 2000 Japanese medium-length film (54 min.) directed by Sang-il Lee. It premiered in 2000 at the Pia Film Festival in Tokyo, but was only released on April 21, 2001 by Pia Production. A comedy drama, it depicts the life of a high school student attending a Korean school in Japan, especially focusing on the school baseball team.

It was produced in 1999 as a graduation piece at the Japan Film School and won four awards including the Grand Prix at the Pia Film Festival (PFF) 2000. It is Sang-il Lee's directorial debut, before his first feature film two years later. It is also the debut work of cinematographer Shin Hayasaka.

== Cast ==
- Yang Dae-song (Korean: 양대송; Japanese: ヤン・デソン) - Mashima Hidekazu
- Cho Hyun-Ki (Korean: 조현기; Japanese: チョ・ヒョンギ) - Ryujin Yamamoto
- Yoon Na-mi (Korean: 윤나미; Japanese: ユン・ナミ) - Shiho Takemoto
- Lee Chong-bok (Korean: 이종복; Japanese: 李鍾福) - Naohiro Ariyama
- Dae-song's father - Tsutomu Yuzawa
- Dae-song's mother - Kintohime
- Yang Song-mi (Korean: 양송미; Japanese: ヤン・ソンミ) - Yuka Shimizu
- Suzuki - Hiroshi Nishikawa
- Principal - Reiichi Ogiso
- Baseball club manager - Takaya Fujiwara
- Female teacher - Wu Xing-hime
- Male teacher - Ike Yoshihide
- Convenience store clerk - Kazuhiko Koshikawa
- Ms. Saito - Asami Saito
- Omiya Ana - Ikuyo Kimura
- Pupil in the class - Kazuaki Kubo
- Pupil in the class - Koji Moyama
- Pupil in the class - Naomichi Koike
- Delinquent of the underpass - Ryota Tokunaga
- Delinquent in the underpass - Sadaharu Yashiro

== Title ==
The title character, 青, means blue in Japanese (read "ao"), and translates to "chong" (which also means blue) in Korean. The sign was chosen as the title because, in Japan, the word Chong is a derogatory term for Koreans in the country. The film is therefore sometimes referred to as Ao - Chong or Blue - Chong.

== Awards ==
- 22nd Pia Film Festival (2000): Grand Prix
- Planning Award (TBS Award)
- Entertainment Award (Rentrack Japan Award)
- Music Award (TOKYO FM Award)

== Screenings ==
- 29th International Film Festival Rotterdam
- 4th Busan International Film Festival
- 5th Shinyuri Film Festival
- 10th Niigata Film Festival
- 15th Takasaki Film Festival

== DVD ==
A DVD version was released by Geneon on April 7, 2006.

== Reception ==
The film "skillfully manages to approach the difficult subject of the Korean minority in Japan through a charming and very involving story about a man between two nationalities", according to Nippon Connection.

Chong was also said to be a "groundbreaking [production] in the way [it] expressed the self-approach of Korean-Japanese or zainichi Koreans with rich humour. This subject matter, which in the past could only be expressed in a dark and serious way, was here skillfully expressed in a light-hearted and funny way".

The film alludes to elements in the life of the director.
