= Nobuyuki Nakajima =

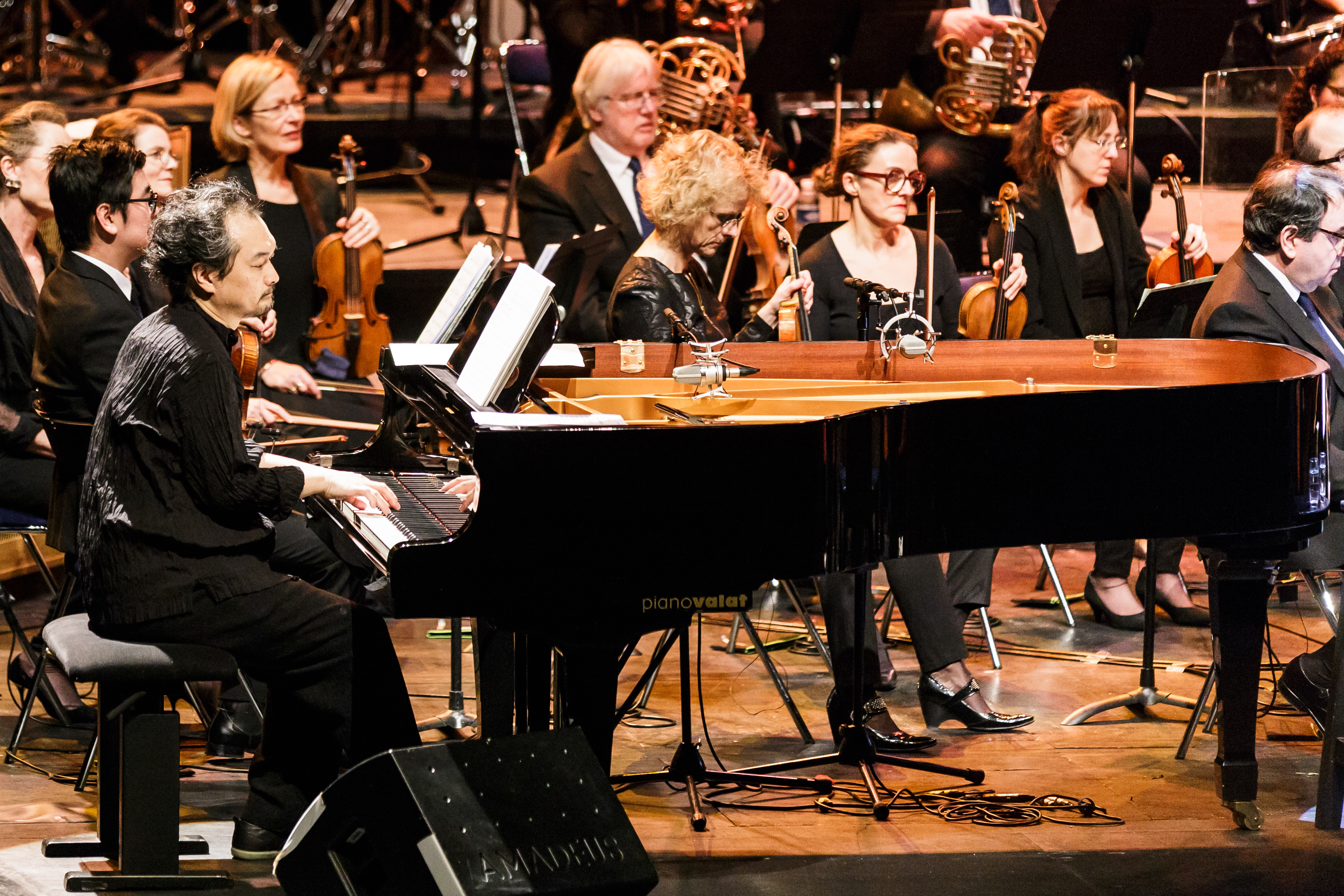

Background information
- Born: 31 July 1969 (age 57)
- Genres: Film Music; Classical; Pops
- Occupations: Composer; Pianist
- Years active: 1995 –
- Website: nobuyukinakajima.com

Nobuyuki Nakajima (中島 ノブユキ) is a Japanese musician, composer, arranger, and pianist, who studied composition in Tokyo and Paris. He has composed original soundtracks for Japanese TV series such as the NHK Taiga drama Yae no Sakura (nominated for the 42nd International Emmy Awards, Drama Series).

In recent years, he participated in Jane Birkin's world tours (Jane Birkin sings Serge Gainsbourg "Via Japan") as musical director, orchestrator and pianist (over 70 concerts in 27 countries) 2011–2013. Since 2016, he also joined her world tour "Gainsbourg Symphonique", as the orchestral arranger and pianist.

== Discography ==
=== Studio albums ===
- ETE, Palma ~ a vague impression of the summer ~ (2006)
- PASSACAILLE (2007)
- MELANCOLIA (2010)
- Cancellare (2012)
- clair-obscur (2014)
- Broken Blossoms (2015)

=== Original soundtrack albums ===
- The Fallen Angel (Ningen Shikkaku) (2010)
- Tamayura OVA (2010)
- Tamayura ~ hitotose ~ (2011)
- Yae no Sakura I (2013)
- Yae no Sakura II (2013)
- Yae no Sakura III (2013)
- Yae no Sakura complete edition (2014)
- The Mourner (2015)

== Works as a Composer ==
=== Film ===
- The Fallen Angel (dir. Genjiro Arato / 2010)
- The Mourner (dir. Yukihiko Tsutsumi / 2015)
- good-bye (dir. Toshihiro Hanyu / 2015)
- sinsin (dir. Yu Yamanaka / 2020)

=== Drama ===
- Yae's Sakura (Yae no Sakura) (NHK Taiga Drama / 2013), 42nd International Emmy Awards Nominee, Drama Series
- Kamisama no Boat (dir. Takashi Minamoto / NHK-BS / 2013)
- Inemuri Sensei (dir. Takashi Minamoto / TV Asahi / 2013)
- Liquid: Oni no Sake, Kiseki no Kura (dir. Takashi Minamoto / NHK-BS / 2015)
- Beautiful Slow Life (dir. Takashi Minamoto / NHK / 2015)
- Godan (WOWOW / 2015)
- Tokyo Trial (NHK / Netflix / 2016)
- Shiawase wa Tabete Nete Mate (NHK / 2025)

=== Animated film ===
- Tamayura (dir. Junichi Sato / 2010~2016)

=== TV program ===
- Tabi no Chikara Theme music (NHK-BS Documentary / 2011)
- Musée d'Orsay (NHK-8K / 2020)

== Works as an arranger ==
- Jane Birkin : Jane Birkin sings Serge Gainsbourg "VIA JAPAN" 2011-2013 (Arrangement / Piano)
- Jane Birkin : Birkin Gainsbourg - le symphonique 2016~ (Orchestral Arrangement / Piano)
- Jane Birkin : Gainsbourg Symphonie Intime 2018~ (Arrangement / Piano)
- PIAF SYMPHONIQUE 2019~ (Orchestral Arrangement / Piano)
- Alain Chamfort : DANDY SYMPHONIQUE 2020~ (Orchestral Arrangement / Piano)

== Other works ==
=== Compilation ===
- " Ibiza Sundowner Presented By José Padilla " (2012) Thinking of You (NN's Dreamy Mix)

=== Collaboration ===
- " une petite fille " Jane Birkin + Nobuyuki Nakajima (2012)
