= Scrap Heaven =

- Film poster
- Directed by: Sang-il Lee
- Written by: Sang-il Lee
- Produced by: Suguru Kubota; Masami Yanagihara; Satoshi Kouno; Haruhiko Yoshida
- Starring: Ryō Kase; Joe Odagiri; Chiaki Kuriyama; Akira Emoto; Ken Mitsuishi
- Cinematography: Kōzō Shibasaki
- Edited by: Tsuyoshi Imai
- Music by: Shigekazu Aida
- Distributed by: Tokyo Shock
- Release date: October 8, 2005 (Japan)
- Running time: 117 minutes
- Country: Japan
- Language: Japanese

Scrap Heaven (Japanese: スクラップ・ヘブン, Hepburn: Sukurappu Hebun) is a 2005 thriller drama film, directed by Sang-il Lee. The film was theatrically released on October 8, 2005, in Japan. It was later released to North American stores in 2007.

== Plot ==
A pharmacist, police officer, and a janitor are commuting fall hostages on bus that gets hijacked by a terrorist. The terrorist forces the three into a violent game of Rock, Paper, Scissors and Russian roulette, which the janitor Tetsu loses. The terrorist then shoots Tetsu, causing the bus to make a sudden stop. After noticing that pharmacist Saki has only one eye, the terrorist feels remorse and finally turns the weapon on himself. The tragic bus ride leaves police officer Shingo feeling humiliated and ashamed of himself, for not handling the bus hijacking.

Several months later, Shingo and Tetsu meet again. After being humiliated in the police force, and saving Tetsu from the yakuza, the two decide to get revenge on society by starting a revenge-for-hire operation. By scribbling graffiti on bathroom walls to advertise their business, Shingo and Tetsu offer their services to anyone with a problem. They start getting customers like a patient wanting to get revenge on a doctor for malpractice. Meanwhile, the pharmacist Saki, also affected by the hijacking becomes disillusioned and anti-social. She begins to plot her own ways of getting revenge on society by constructing a liquid bomb.

== Cast ==
- Ryō Kase as Police Officer Shingo
- Joe Odagiri as Toilet Cleaner Tetsu
- Chiaki Kuriyama as Pharmacist Saki
- Akira Emoto
- Ken Mitsuishi
