= Sang-il Lee (director) =

Zainichi Korean filmmaker (born 1974)

- 李 相日
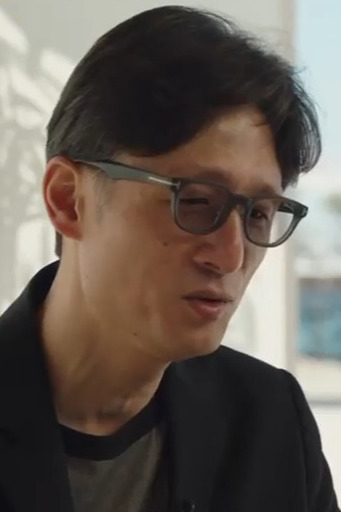
- Lee in 2025
- Born: 6 January 1974 (age 52); Niigata, Niigata Prefecture, Japan
- Occupation: Director
- Years active: 1999–present

Japanese name
- Kanji: 李 相日
- Hiragana: り さんいる
- Katakana: リ サンイル
Transcriptions
- Romanization: Ri San'iru

Korean name
- Hangul: 이상일
- Hanja: 李相日
- RR: I Sangil
- MR: I Sangil

Sang-il Lee (Japanese: 李 相日, Hepburn: Ri San'iru; Korean: 이상일, born January 6, 1974) is a film director based in Japan. He is a third-generation Zainichi Korean born in Niigata and raised in Yokohama, Japan. His films often explore human conflict and societal issues. He has received multiple awards at the Japan Academy Film Prize, including Picture of the Year and Director of the Year.

Lee began his career with his graduation project from the Japan Institute of the Moving Image, Blue – Chong (1999). The coming-of-age film, featuring a main character who attends a North Korean-affiliated high school mirroring Lee's own background, won four awards including the Grand Prize at the 2000 Pia Film Festival (PFF). His 2006 film Hula Girls, which depicts coal miners' daughters saving their declining town through hula dancing, won Best Picture and Best Director at the Japan Academy Film Prize, and was selected as Japan's official entry for Best Foreign Language Film at the 79th Academy Awards.

He subsequently directed adaptations of Shuichi Yoshida's novels. Villain (2010), which depicts the aftermath of a murder, and Rage (2016), an ensemble drama exploring suspicion and trust, both received numerous Japan Academy nominations and acting awards. In addition to directing a Japanese remake of Clint Eastwood's Unforgiven (2013) and the kidnapping drama The Wandering Moon (2022), Lee directed his third Yoshida adaptation, Kokuho (2025). The film, which depicts the lives of kabuki actors, grossed over 20.34 billion yen, surpassing Bayside Shakedown 2 to become the highest-grossing live-action Japanese film in history. It won 10 categories at the 49th Japan Academy Film Prize and earned a nomination for Best Makeup and Hairstyling at the 98th Academy Awards.

In 2025, Lee received the Akira Kurosawa Award at the 38th Tokyo International Film Festival. The following year, he was awarded the Minister of Education, Culture, Sports, Science and Technology's Art Encouragement Prize from the Agency for Cultural Affairs, as well as the Japan Art Academy Prize.

== Early life ==
Lee was born in 1974 in Niigata, Niigata Prefecture, as a third-generation Zainichi Korean. His father was a teacher at the Niigata Korean Elementary and Junior High School. After living in Niigata until the age of four, Lee was raised in Yokohama, Kanagawa Prefecture. He attended Korean elementary, middle, and high schools in Yokohama, and later enrolled in the Department of Economics at Kanagawa University.

During his high school years, Lee also experienced a rebellious phase much like Ken, the protagonist of his later film 69. Reflecting on his time at Zainichi Korean schools, Lee recalled that portraits of Kim Il Sung and Kim Jong Il were displayed in every classroom. Questioning their purpose, he stated that he frequently felt the urge to hurl the portraits off the school's roof.

His part-time involvement in the production of V-Cinema sparked his interest in film, leading him to enter the Japan Academy of Moving Images (currently the Japan Institute of the Moving Image) in Kawasaki, Kanagawa Prefecture, after graduating from Kanagawa University in 1996.

== Career ==
=== 1999–2005: Directorial debut and early works ===
In 1999, Lee wrote and directed his graduation project film, Blue – Chong. The script, which he adapted from his own real-life experiences, garnered the support of his classmates at the film school, leading to his selection as the director. The coming-of-age film centers on a third-generation Zainichi Korean who is the ace pitcher of a Korean high school baseball team, using humor to depict his struggles with his Korean and Japanese identities. Chong was highly acclaimed and won the Grand Prize at the 22nd Pia Film Festival (PFF) Award in 2000. It also became the first film in the festival's history to sweep four categories, simultaneously winning the Planning Award, the Entertainment Award, and the Music Award. Regarding his choice of the Zainichi theme for his debut, Lee stated that it was "like playing the joker in my hand right from the start."

In 2002, Lee made his feature film debut by writing and directing Border Line. The film was funded through the PFF Scholarship, a program that provides production funding for the second film of PFF winners. A road movie inspired by actual events, Border Line gained recognition upon being selected for the Vancouver International Film Festival. This critical acclaim led to a general theatrical release in June 2003.

In 2003, Toei selected Lee to direct a film 69 adaptation of Ryu Murakami's autobiographical novel of same name. With a screenplay by Kankuro Kudo and starring Satoshi Tsumabuki, the coming-of-age film follows high school students in Sasebo, Nagasaki Prefecture, in 1969, against the backdrop of the rising anti-Vietnam War movement and university protests. Lee, who was born in 1974, remarked, "Rather than a mere recreation, I intended to make a universal youth film that resonates with the present day." The film was released nationwide in July 2004.

In October 2005, Scrap Heaven, written and directed by Lee and produced by Office Shirous and Cinequanon, was released. The story centers on three protagonists around the age of 30—the same age as Lee at the time—who, after being involved in a bus hijacking, start a revenge proxy game against an irresponsible society. The film starred Joe Odagiri, Ryo Kase, and Chiaki Kuriyama. Lee began writing the script just before turning 30, explaining, "At this age, you can see your future to some extent. It is different from the bright future you imagined in your teens. Chased by work and bound by the real world, your imagination also shrinks. You get frustrated, become apathetic, and feel a vague sense of helplessness. I based the story on those feelings."

=== 2006–2017: Hula Girls, Villain, and Rage ===
In 2006, Lee directed and co-wrote Hula Girls, a produced and distributed by Cinequanon. Based on a true story set in Iwaki City, Fukushima Prefecture approximately 40 years prior, the film depicts the early days of the Joban Hawaiian Center (currently the Spa Resort Hawaiians) as it attempted to transition the town from a declining coal industry to a tourism industry utilizing hot springs. The project was initiated after Hitomi Ishihara, a producer at Cinequanon, visited the Spa Resort Hawaiians for another film shoot and became interested in the history of its founding. Following its release, the film garnered strong support through word of mouth, eventually exceeding 1.3 million admissions and 1.5 billion yen in box-office revenue. Hula Girls won Best Film at the 19th Nikkan Sports Film Awards in December 2006. On January 9, 2007, it was selected as the number one Japanese film at the 80th Kinema Junpo Best Ten awards. Furthermore, at the 30th Japan Academy Film Prize in February 2007, the film won Picture of the Year, while Lee won Director of the Year and Screenplay of the Year. The film was also submitted as Japan's official entry for Best Foreign Language Film at the 79th Academy Awards.

In March 2007, Lee received the Art Encouragement Prize for New Artists in the film category from the Agency for Cultural Affairs, an honor awarded annually to artists who have broken new ground in their respective fields. Upon receiving the award, Lee stated, "I will simply continue to give my all to each film, one by one. With this recognition comes greater scrutiny from others, so I must be even stricter with myself. I want to strive to deliver high-quality works."

In 2008, Lee contributed to The Short Films: We Were All Once Children, an omnibus of five short films centered on the theme of children, which was produced by Asahi Broadcasting Corporation in Osaka to commemorate the relocation of its headquarters. Lee directed the short Tagatame, which utilizes a clever narrative twist to depict the struggles of a terminally ill man (played by Tatsuya Fuji) who worries about the future of his 29-year-old intellectually disabled son. The anthology, featuring additional shorts directed by Kazuyuki Izutsu, Kazuki Omori, Yoichi Sai, and Junji Sakamoto, was presented at a free commemorative screening in July 2008.

In November 2009, filming began in Kyushu region for Villain, a film adaptation of Shuichi Yoshida's suspense novel about a construction worker who murders a woman and flees across three prefectures in Kyushu with another woman. Lee directed the film and co-wrote the screenplay with Yoshida. Distributed by Toho, the film stars Satoshi Tsumabuki and Eri Fukatsu, and features a musical score by Joe Hisaishi. Villain was completed in April 2010 and released in September of that year. The film was highly acclaimed and garnered numerous accolades, including Best Actress for Fukatsu at the 34th Montreal World Film Festival. It won Best Film at the 23rd Nikkan Sports Film Awards, as well as Best Picture and Best Actress (for Fukatsu) at the 35th Hochi Film Awards. Furthermore, Villain was ranked as the number one Japanese film at the Kinema Junpo Best Ten, where Lee won Best Director and shared the Best Screenplay award with Yoshida. Villain grossed 1.98 billion yen at the box office.

In August 2012, Warner Bros. announced that Lee would direct a Japanese jidaigeki remake of Clint Eastwood's 1992 Western film Unforgiven, retaining the same title. Produced and distributed by Warner Bros., the Japanese adaptation is set in Hokkaido during the early Meiji era. The film stars Ken Watanabe as the protagonist, a remnant of the Tokugawa shogunate who was feared as Jubei the Killer by the Satcho forces during the Bakumatsu period. He faces off against Ichizo Oishi (played by Koichi Sato), a police chief who currently controls the town after being passed over for promotion despite his background in the Imperial army. Filming took place entirely in Hokkaido, beginning in late September 2012, where a large open set was constructed for the production. The film was released in September 2013.

Lee directed and wrote the screenplay for Rage, reuniting with Shuichi Yoshida to adapt his 2014 novel of the same name. Produced and distributed by Toho, the ensemble drama revolves around the unsolved murder of a married couple in Tokyo and three mysterious men who subsequently appear in Tokyo, Okinawa, and Chiba. The film stars Ken Watanabe, Aoi Miyazaki, Satoshi Tsumabuki, and Suzu Hirose, featuring a musical score by Ryuichi Sakamoto, and was released in September 2016. Reflecting on Lee's rigorous directing style, Hirose recalled, "To Director Lee, my acting must have been out of the question. He didn't hold back in saying things that are usually difficult to say, tearing everything I did to shreds. I was desperately trying to catch up while feeling incredibly frustrated." Rage grossed 1.61 billion yen at the box office, and Lee won Best Director at the 41st Hochi Film Awards for his work on the film. Furthermore, at the 40th Japan Academy Film Prize announced in January 2017, Rage received the most honors of the year, securing Excellent Awards in 11 categories with a total of 12 awards. These included Excellent Picture, Excellent Director for Lee, and acting awards for Miyazaki, Tsumabuki, Mirai Moriyama, and Hirose.

In 2017, Lee contributed to the omnibus film The Blue Hearts ga Kikoeru (The Blue Hearts), a project celebrating the 30th anniversary of the legendary Japanese rock band The Blue Hearts. Lee directed the short film "1001 no Violin" (1001 Violins), starring Etsushi Toyokawa. The drama follows a former worker at the Fukushima Daiichi Nuclear Power Plant who evacuated to Tokyo with his family following the 2011 Great East Japan earthquake and tsunami. Three years after the disaster, struggling with his unresolved feelings, he returns to Fukushima to search for the dog they left behind. Pursuing strict realism, Lee insisted on shooting the segment on location in Fukushima, utilizing actual homes borrowed from evacuees while monitoring radiation levels with Geiger counters. He stated that filming anywhere else was not an option, as the fictional story was deeply rooted in the harsh realities faced by actual victims. Although the omnibus project initially faced the threat of cancellation due to the production company's financial difficulties, it was ultimately saved by a successful crowdfunding campaign and received a nationwide theatrical release in April 2017. Reflecting on the film's underlying message, Lee noted that it explores the struggle of individuals trying to protect their own conscience from suffocating under societal pressures, a theme he felt strongly resonated with the enduring and unyielding spirit of The Blue Hearts' music.

=== 2021–present: The Wandering Moon and Kokuho ===
In August 2021, filming began on The Wandering Moon, Lee's adaptation of Yu Nagira's 2020 novel. The story centers on a woman who was branded a kidnapped girl at the age of nine and the college student labeled as her kidnapper, depicting their reunion 15 years later as they navigate the lingering stigmas and the hidden truths behind the incident. The film reunites Lee with Suzu Hirose, who co-stars alongside Tori Matsuzaka, Ryusei Yokohama, and Mikako Tabe. Co-produced by Uno-Films, led by U-Next CEO Yasuhide Uno, who also served as executive producer, and Gaga, the film was distributed by Gaga and released in Japan on May 13, 2022. For his work on the film, Lee won Best Director at the 35th Nikkan Sports Film Awards. Furthermore, The Wandering Moon received Excellent Awards in six categories, including Excellent Pictures, at the 46th Japan Academy Film Prize.

In March 2024, Lee began filming Kokuho, marking his third live-action adaptation of a work by Shuichi Yoshida. Based on Yoshida's novel of the same name, the story is set in Japan from the post-war period through the era of rapid economic growth. It follows a protagonist born into a yakuza family who becomes an onnagata kabuki actor, depicting his journey to become a Living National Treasure as he hones his craft and pushes to greater heights alongside the scion of the Hanai family. The film stars Ryo Yoshizawa, with supporting performances by Ryusei Yokohama, Ken Watanabe, Shinobu Terajima, and Mitsuki Takahata, and features a screenplay by Satoko Okudera. Toho, which had produced and distributed Lee's two previous Yoshida adaptations, opted to handle only domestic distribution due to the film's older target demographic, high production costs, and lengthy runtime. Consequently, production was spearheaded by Sony Music's Aniplex and Myariagon Studio. Released on June 6, 2025, the film became a massive box office success. Within 172 days of its release by November 24, it grossed 17,377,394,500 yen, surpassing Bayside Shakedown 2 (2003) to break the record for the highest-grossing live-action Japanese film in history. By March 8 of the following year, its box office revenue reached 20.34 billion yen, making it the 8th highest-grossing film of all time in Japan and the second highest-grossing live-action film, trailing only Titanic (1997). At the 49th Japan Academy Film Prize in March 2026, the film swept the awards, winning 10 categories including Picture of the Year and Director of the Year. It was also nominated for Best Makeup and Hairstyling at the 98th Academy Awards.

In August 2025, Lee was selected to receive the Akira Kurosawa Award at the 38th Tokyo International Film Festival. Following this, on March 2, 2026, he was awarded the Minister of Education, Culture, Sports, Science and Technology's Art Encouragement Prize by the Agency for Cultural Affairs. Furthermore, on March 26, he received the 2025 Japan Art Academy Prize, which honors outstanding artistic achievements.

== Filmography ==
- 2000: Blue – Chong
- 2002: Border Line
- 2004: 69
- 2005: Scrap Heaven
- 2006: Hula Girls
- 2010: Kaidan - Horror Classics (Ayashiki Bungo Kaidan) in ep. 3 "The Nose" (TV series)
- 2010: Villain
- 2013: Unforgiven
- 2016: Rage
- 2017: The Blue Hearts
- 2022: The Wandering Moon
- 2025: Kokuho

== Awards and nominations ==
Awards	Year	Category	Nominated work	Result	Ref.
Tokyo International Film Festival	2025	Akira Kurosawa Award	Himself	Honoured	
Hochi Film Awards	2006	Best Film	Hula Girls	Won	
Hochi Film Awards	2016	Best Director	Rage	Won	
Hochi Film Awards	2025	Best Director	Kokuho	Won	
Japan Academy Film Prize	2007	Best Film	Hula Girls	Won	
Japan Academy Film Prize	2007	Best Screenplay	Hula Girls	Won	
Japan Academy Film Prize	2007	Best Director	Hula Girls	Won	
Japan Academy Film Prize	2026	Best Film	Kokuho	Won	
Japan Academy Film Prize	2026	Best Director	Kokuho	Won	
Korean Association of Film Critics Awards	2026	FIPRESCI Award (Foreign)	Kokuho	Won	
