= The Mourner =

- Poster
- Directed by: Yukihiko Tsutsumi
- Screenplay by: Sumio Ōmori
- Based on: The Mourner by Arata Tendo
- Starring: Kengo Kora; Yuriko Ishida; Arata Iura
- Cinematography: Daisuke Sōma
- Edited by: Chieko Suzaki
- Music by: Nobuyuki Nakajima
- Production companies: Kino Films; Kinoshita Group; Office Crescendo
- Release date: February 14, 2015 (Japan)
- Running time: 138 minutes
- Country: Japan
- Language: Japanese
- Box office: ¥59.9 million

The Mourner (Japanese: 悼む人, Hepburn: Itamu Hito) is a 2015 Japanese drama film directed by Yukihiko Tsutsumi and based on a novel of the same name by Arata Tendo. It was released on February 14, 2015.

== Cast ==
- Kengo Kora as Shizuto Sakatsuki
- Yuriko Ishida as Yukiyo Nagi
- Arata Iura as Sakuya Kōsui
- Yusuke Yamamoto
- Yumi Asō
- Suzuka Ohgo
- Keiko Toda
- Mitsuru Hirata as Takahiko Sakatsuki
- Kippei Shiina as Kōtarō Makino
- Shinobu Otake as Junko Sakatsuki

== Production ==
Filming started on March 22, 2014.

== Reception ==
The film has grossed ¥59.9 million at the Japanese box office.
