= The Eyes of My Mother =

2016 American film by Nicolas Pesce

- Theatrical release poster
- Directed by: Nicolas Pesce
- Written by: Nicolas Pesce
- Produced by: Max Born; Jacob Wasserman; Schuyler Weiss
- Starring: Kika Magalhães; Olivia Bond; Diana Agostini; Paul Nazak
- Cinematography: Zach Kuperstein
- Edited by: Nicolas Pesce
- Music by: Ariel Loh
- Production companies: Borderline Presents; Tandem Pictures
- Distributed by: Magnet Releasing
- Release dates: January 22, 2016 (Sundance); December 2, 2016 (United States)
- Running time: 77 minutes
- Country: United States
- Languages: English; Portuguese
- Budget: $300,000
- Box office: $48,539

The Eyes of My Mother is a 2016 American black-and-white horror film written, edited and directed by Nicolas Pesce in his directorial debut. It stars Kika Magalhães, Olivia Bond, Diana Agostini, and Paul Nazak. The film was produced by Borderline Presents and Tandem Pictures and distributed by Magnet Releasing.

The Eyes of My Mother premiered at the 2016 Sundance Film Festival and was theatrically released in the United States on December 2, 2016, by Magnet Releasing. The film received generally positive reviews from critics and a polarizing reception from audiences.

== Plot ==
Francisca and her parents live on a farm where they raise animals. A trained surgeon, Francisca's mother teaches her how to remove eyeballs from farm animals, as well as the legend of St. Francis of Assisi. One day, Charlie, a door-to-door salesman, asks to use the bathroom. Against her better judgment, Francisca's mother lets him into the house. Charlie draws a gun and takes Francisca's mother into the bathroom. When her father comes home, he finds Charlie bludgeoning his wife's body in the tub. He knocks Charlie out and chains him up in the barn. Francisca and her father bury her mother in the backyard. Francisca visits Charlie and he explains the thrill of killing others. When he asks Francisca if she plans to kill him, she reacts with confusion, proclaiming that Charlie is her only friend and that she will take care of him. She then removes Charlie's eyes and vocal cords, bags them, and puts them in the refrigerator.

Years later, Francisca's father dies, and the now adult Francisca preserves his body. At a bar, Francisca meets a young woman named Kimiko, whom she takes home. Kimiko asks about Francisca's mother; when Francisca explains that her mother was murdered, Kimiko offers condolences, and Francisca kisses her. Francisca then jokes that she killed her father. A frightened Kimiko tries to leave, but Francisca murders her before dismembering her and placing her bagged organs in the refrigerator. Afterward, she bathes Charlie, still chained up in the barn, and brings him inside to sleep in her bed with her. Charlie attempts to escape, but she catches him and repeatedly stabs him. She tells him that he was right; killing someone "feels amazing". She places his organs into bags and keeps them in her refrigerator, just as she had done to Kimiko.

Now distraught at being completely alone, Francisca wanders the woods until she reaches a highway and catches a ride with a woman named Lucy and her infant son Antonio back home. Francisca becomes enamored of Antonio, and upon reaching her house, asks Lucy if she can hold him. When Lucy agrees, she thanks Lucy for the "gift" and rushes out of the car with Antonio. Lucy frantically pursues her, but Francisca stabs her, removes her eyes and vocal cords, and keeps her chained up in the barn like she had done to Charlie, subsequently spending the next few years raising Antonio as her own son.

When Antonio reaches late childhood, he becomes curious about the barn, which Francisca has forbidden him to enter. He enters the barn as Francisca is asleep one night and is terrified at the sight of a blinded, chained Lucy, groaning unintelligibly and reaching for him. Antonio asks Francisca about the woman in the barn, but she claims to not know what he is referring to. Lucy later escapes the barn and blindly makes her way to a road where a trucker finds her. After discovering Lucy missing, Francisca digs up her mother's remains and cradles the corpse as she speaks to it, expressing how much she misses her. As she sees police approaching her house, she rushes inside to wake Antonio and urges him to leave, telling him how much she loves him and making him promise that whatever he learns about her that night won't change that. Armed with a knife, she hides in the bathroom with him and begs the police not to take her baby, and a gun is fired.

== Cast ==
- Kika Magalhães as Francisca
  - Olivia Bond as Young Francisca
- Diana Agostini as the Mother
- Paul Nazak as the Father
- Will Brill as Charlie
- Joey Curtis-Green as Antonio
- Clara Wong as Kimiko
- Flora Diaz as Lucy

== Release ==
The Eyes of My Mother premiered in the NEXT section at the 2016 Sundance Film Festival on January 22, 2016. It was acquired by Magnolia Pictures' foreign language film division Magnet Releasing. It was released to select theaters and via iTunes, cable/satellite video on demand, and Amazon Video on December 2, 2016.

== Soundtrack ==
Composer, Ariel Loh, exclaimed that they were inspired by simplistic music and wanted the score to reflect that. “There is always something stark and clean about a simple design that often gives it more weight and effectiveness than something intricate and complicated," Loh told Vehlinggo. The soundtrack was released by Waxwork Records on vinyl for the first time and included cues that didn't make it in the film, and featured album art by Nikita Kaun.

== Reception ==
The Eyes of My Mother was positively received by critics. On Rotten Tomatoes, the film holds an approval rating of 78%, based on 101 reviews, with an average of 6.90/10. The site's consensus states: "The Eyes of My Mother uses a shocking trauma to fuel a hauntingly hypnotic odyssey whose nightmarish chill lingers long after the closing credits." Metacritic reports a 63 out of 100 rating, based on 23 critics, indicating "generally favorable reviews".
