= The Carpenter's Son =

2025 film by Lotfy Nathan

- Theatrical release poster
- Directed by: Lotfy Nathan
- Written by: Lotfy Nathan
- Based on: Infancy Gospel of Thomas
- Produced by: Julie Viez; Alex Hughes; Riccardo Maddalosso; Eugene Kotlyarenko; Nicolas Cage; Yiannis Iakovidis
- Starring: Nicolas Cage; Noah Jupe; Souheila Yacoub; Isla Johnston; FKA Twigs
- Cinematography: Simon Beaufils
- Edited by: Sophie Corra; Monika Willi; Guillaume Fusil
- Music by: Lorenz Dangel
- Production companies: Spacemaker; Cinenovo; Anonymous Content; Curious Gremlin; Saturn Films
- Distributed by: Magnolia Pictures (United States); Altitude Film Distribution (United Kingdom)
- Release dates: November 14, 2025 (United States); November 21, 2025 (United Kingdom)
- Running time: 94 minutes
- Countries: United Kingdom; France; United States
- Language: English
- Box office: $170,553

The Carpenter's Son is a 2025 supernatural thriller film written and directed by Lotfy Nathan and starring actors Nicolas Cage, FKA Twigs, Noah Jupe and Souheila Yacoub. The film is based on the early years of Jesus Christ as chronicled in the Infancy Gospel of Thomas.

The film was released in the United States on November 14, 2025.

== Cast ==
- Nicolas Cage as The Carpenter (Joseph)
- FKA Twigs as The Mother (Mary)
- Noah Jupe as The Boy (Jesus)
- Souheila Yacoub as Lilith
- Isla Johnston as The Stranger (Satan)

== Production ==
In May 2024, it was announced that Cage, FKA Twigs, Jupe and Yacoub were cast in the film.

Filming began and occurred in Sfakia, Preveli and Megara (all in Greece) in August and September 2024. During filming, Cage was reportedly attacked by a swarm of bees in one of the caves intended to be a filming location.

In May 2025, Magnolia Pictures acquired US distribution rights to the film.

Director Lotfy Nathan is of Coptic Christian background. In an interview he said that "for a lot of Coptic Christians–which is where I come from–they wouldn’t abide the idea of Jesus having human doubt and the potential of sin, but for me to depict that, that makes for a picture of him that’s easier to identify with, which is actually a good thing."

== Release ==
The Carpenter's Son was released in the United States on November 14, 2025. The film was then released a week later in the United Kingdom on November 21, by Altitude Film Distribution.

== Reception ==
=== Critical response ===
On review aggregator Rotten Tomatoes, the film holds a 30% approval rating based on 64 critic reviews, with an average rating of 4.8/10. The website's critics consensus reads, "The Carpenter's Son is peculiar enough to hold some cult appeal, but for all the promise this biblical horror's conception holds, its execution proves far from immaculate." On Metacritic, the film holds a weighted average score of 40/100, based on 18 critics.

The Guardian awarded the film two stars out of a possible five, describing it as "a bafflingly acted and messily made bore ... a messy and atonal, if mercifully short, waste of eye-catching locations".

=== Bans ===
The film was banned in the Philippines by the MTRCB after it deemed its presentation of Jesus Christ as "rebellious, malicious, or seemingly under demonic influence", along with "contemptuous" and "violent, sexual, or degrading" portrayals of religious imagery and figures as offensive to Christian values.
