= With the Light =

Manga and television series

- Cover of the first volume of With the Light

光とともに…〜自閉症児を抱えて〜 (Hikari to Tomoni... ~Jiheishōji o Kakaete~)
- Genre: Drama
- Manga
- Written by: Keiko Tobe
- Published by: Akita Shoten
- English publisher: Yen Press
- Magazine: For Mrs.
- Original run: 2000 – June 2010
- Volumes: 15
- Television drama
- Original network: NTV
- Original run: April 14, 2004 – June 23, 2004

With the Light: Raising an Autistic Child (光とともに…〜自閉症児を抱えて〜, Hikari to Tomoni… ~Jiheishōji o Kakaete~) is a josei drama manga by Keiko Tobe. It began serialization in 2000 in For Mrs., and serial chapters were collected in 15 tankōbon volumes by Akita Shoten. The series depicts the struggles of a young mother, Sachiko Azuma, raising her autistic son Hikaru in modern Japan. The series is licensed in English in North America by Yen Press, with eight volumes (each collecting two tankōbon volumes with the exception of the final volume) published as of September 2011.

In January 2009, the series went on hiatus due to Tobe's illness and remained uncompleted when she died in January 2010. Her works during her illness were collected and published with some of her earlier works as volume 15 in June 2010.

The series received an Excellence Prize for manga at the 2004 Japan Media Arts Festival. It was adapted as a television drama, airing on NTV from April 14, 2004, to June 23, 2004, which won several awards at Japan's 41st Television Drama Academy Awards, including "Best Drama". The theme song was performed by Rythem.

== Plot ==
The manga series begins with Hikaru's birth. Sachiko, Hikaru's mother, realizes that her son is a little bit different from the other babies. When Hikaru is diagnosed with autism at one and a half years old, Sachiko faces the ignorance towards autism from others around her. However, gradually, Sachiko meets more people who are accepting of Hikaru and his autism, and she regains her determination to raise Hikaru into a "cheerful, working adult" in society.

== Characters ==
=== Azuma Family ===
Sachiko Azuma (née Nishiyama)
The narrator of the series/Hikaru's mother. In the beginning, she finds herself battling the difficulties of raising an autistic child along with the indifference of her husband and society blaming her for her son's condition. However, with the help of many people, she starts to raise Hikaru with hope.
Masato Azuma
Sachiko's husband/Hikaru's father. Early on, Masato seemed to be unsympathetic to what Sachiko was going through because his high-level position in his company took hours of hard work, leaving him little time to talk to her. Masato was also embarrassed by Hikaru's behavior and upset by his diagnosis. He and Sachiko separated temporarily after a fight about Masato's refusal to face the issue. Without Sachiko around to make sure he was taking care of himself, he collapsed from overwork. This prompted him to rethink his priorities and decided to choose to become a good father to Hikaru. Masato is demoted in the third volume by a mean superior and sent to a factory far away where no one before lasted for a long time. In his new workplace, Masato completes a series of proposals for products and ideas to improve the lives of disabled people and find them work within the company. These proposals get him promoted in volume four and he sets about setting up a mushroom factory staffed by disabled people, and perhaps Hikaru someday.
Hikaru Azuma
Sachiko and Masato's firstborn, and the main character of the series. His autism showed up one and a half years after his birth. Hikaru hated to be picked up and held as a baby and did not grow in step with children his age, leading Sachiko to seek a doctor for him. He always has been wearing diapers for a long time. He even stays in his stroller even when he's too old for it. Hikaru dislikes loud and painful noises such as crowds, Buddhist chanting, and babies crying. He likes trains and memorizes many of them, including ones no longer running. Like many autistic people, when something is changed in his routine without any warning, such as a show switching times or being canceled, it upsets him. However, as the story continues, he and his parents figure out how to handle the situation. Since elementary school, he starts to show some unique talents, including cooking and mixing colors. Sachiko named Hikaru for the beautiful sunrise when he was born (the Japanese word 光る, which is read as "hikaru", means "shine").
Kanon Azuma
Sachiko and Masato's second child. She was born in second volume of the original version. She does not have autism unlike her brother, Hikaru. Despite this, Sachiko hopes that her two children will grow to care for and teach one another. She was named after the type of music she listened to while giving birth to her (canon). She was born during a typhoon while Masato was away in Sweden.

=== Teachers ===
Shigeru Aoki
The special education teacher at Shichigatsu Elementary; a clever and optimistic instructor. After spending four years with Hikaru, he transfers to another school because he thought staying with the same teacher for a long time wouldn't benefit the students in the special education class. In the years he spends with Hikaru, he helps him grow.
Noriko Wakabayashi
The teacher for the 'buddy system' class at Shichigatsu Elementary, who works closely with Aoki to benefit the students. Later, she marries Aoki; however, unlike him, she continues to stay in Shichigatsu Elementary.
Gunji
Described as having once been a 'passionate teacher', Gunji becomes the new special education teacher after Aoki in Hikaru's fifth grade year. In the beginning, Gunji struggles with the students because she hadn't taught autistic children before and didn't know much about autism. Through trial and error, she eventually regains her passion for teaching children. Since she had one year of teaching left to retire, she leaves the school after teaching Hikaru during his fifth grade year.

=== Others ===
Miyu Honda
Miyu enters the story in the second volume of 'With the Light' (third of the tankōbon). She is autistic, like Hikaru. However, when she entered Shichigatsu Elementary, Miyu's mother didn't know that she was autistic. Also, from being pretty much neglected before, she faced much adversity. But with the help and support of Aoki over the years she spends with him, Miyu grows and develops.
Additionally, her name on the English version of the manga series is spelled wrong; it should actually be written as "Miu" and not "Miyu", since the hiragana of her name is "みう", which is read as "Miu".
Moe Nakajima
Hikaru's childhood friend who cared for him since preschool. Moe is very good with children and hopes to become a preschool teacher someday.
Daisuke Ishida
Daisuke, who is two years older than Hikaru, was Hikaru's partner in planting tomatoes in the school vegetable garden. He enjoyed the time he spent with Hikaru because he was an only child who had always wanted a little brother.
Takuya Oki
Takuya was jealous of Hikaru's loving family because he was abused by his alcoholic father and neglected. Also, his mother runs away from the house with another man, leaving Takuya devastated. But when one day he sees Hikaru wander onto a bus by himself, he goes after him out of worry. Later, Takuya's father dies of liver damage. Takuya is sent to an orphanage, where he is abused by a group of sixth graders. However, he was soon helped by Masato, and possibly got transferred to another orphanage.
Kanata Tanaka
A childhood friend of Hikaru. Kanata becomes a teen idol from his fifth grade year. Later, he moves away because of his father's job, as well as his own career as a celebrity.
Hisako Nakajima
Moe's mother. When Hikaru was on top of a high building, Moe follows him, despite having a fear of heights. Since that incident, Hisako starts to resent Hikaru and Sachiko, blaming them for her daughter's near-death experience. At home, she lives with her daughter and mother, whom she takes care of following a stroke. After seeing how devoted her daughter is to Hikaru, she begins to accept him.
Katakura
One of Sachiko's former friends from the mothers' group. She begins to resent Hikaru because she thinks he is weird, and also Sachiko because she thinks Sachiko isn't doing a good job at raising her son. She cares a lot about how Eri, her daughter, does academically. The reason is because if Eri doesn't do well, she is the one who gets blamed by her husband for not doing a good job with raising her daughter.
Tanaka
One of Sachiko's friends from the mothers' group. Unlike Eri's mother, she stands to defend her Hikaru and Sachiko. Sachiko comments that despite the fact that she dresses flashy, she's always a devoted mother and a loyal friend.
Takako Azuma
Masato's mother. She blames Sachiko at first about Hikaru's diagnosis, but later finds out that autism isn't the parents' fault. While she does not blame Sachiko for Hikaru's autism anymore, she doesn't really accept Hikaru. She is very devoted to Kanon. In tankōbon three, she berates Sachiko for putting Kanon in daycare instead of a kindergarten and letting her act "crude." She presses Sachiko and Masato to send Kanon to the same school as her other granddaughter. She also goes far as to offer to let Kanon, but only Kanon, live with her for the school. Masato rejects her offer. She tends to alternate between a kimono and Western clothing.
Mr. & Mrs. Nishiyama
Sachiko's parents. After Sachiko gets out if the house with Hikaru after an argument with Masato, she lives with them for a while until Masato collapses at work and decides to become a better father to Hikaru. Mrs. Nishiyama has frail health, while Mr. Nishiyama is close to retirement. She sometimes comes to Sachiko and Masato's house and helps out.

== Manga ==
The manga began serialization in For Mrs. in 2000. Serial chapters have been collected in 15 tankōbon volumes by Akita Shoten. The series is licensed in English by Yen Press for North America, which collected two tankōbon volumes in each English volume.

Volume	Japanese		English		English release volume
Volume	ISBN	Release date	ISBN	Release date	English release volume
1	ISBN 978-4-253-10433-3	July 19, 2001	ISBN 978-0-7595-2356-2	September 2007	1
2	ISBN 978-4-253-10434-0	February 21, 2002	ISBN 978-0-7595-2356-2	September 2007	1
3	ISBN 978-4-253-10441-8	October 31, 2002	ISBN 978-0-7595-2359-3	March 2008	2
4	ISBN 978-4-253-10442-5	April 24, 2003	ISBN 978-0-7595-2359-3	March 2008	2
5	ISBN 978-4-253-10443-2	December 4, 2003	ISBN 978-0-7595-2384-5	September 2008	3
6	ISBN 978-4-253-10444-9	June 3, 2004	ISBN 978-0-7595-2384-5	September 2008	3
7	ISBN 978-4-253-10445-6	November 25, 2004	ISBN 978-0-7595-2385-2	March 2009	4
8	ISBN 978-4-253-10455-5	May 28, 2005	ISBN 978-0-7595-2385-2	March 2009	4
9	ISBN 978-4-253-10456-2	November 28, 2005	ISBN 978-0-7595-2401-9	September 2009	5
10	ISBN 978-4-253-10457-9	August 28, 2006	ISBN 978-0-7595-2401-9	September 2009	5
11	ISBN 978-4-253-10581-1	May 28, 2007	ISBN 978-0-316-07733-0	March 2010	6
12	ISBN 978-4-253-10582-8	November 28, 2007	ISBN 978-0-316-07733-0	March 2010	6
13	ISBN 978-4-253-10583-5	April 28, 2008	ISBN 978-0-316-07734-7	September 2010	7
14	ISBN 978-4-253-10584-2	January 28, 2009	ISBN 978-0-316-07734-7	September 2010	7
15	ISBN 978-4-253-10585-9	June 3, 2010	ISBN 978-0-316-19445-7	September 2011	8
