= Kie Kitano =

- 北乃 きい
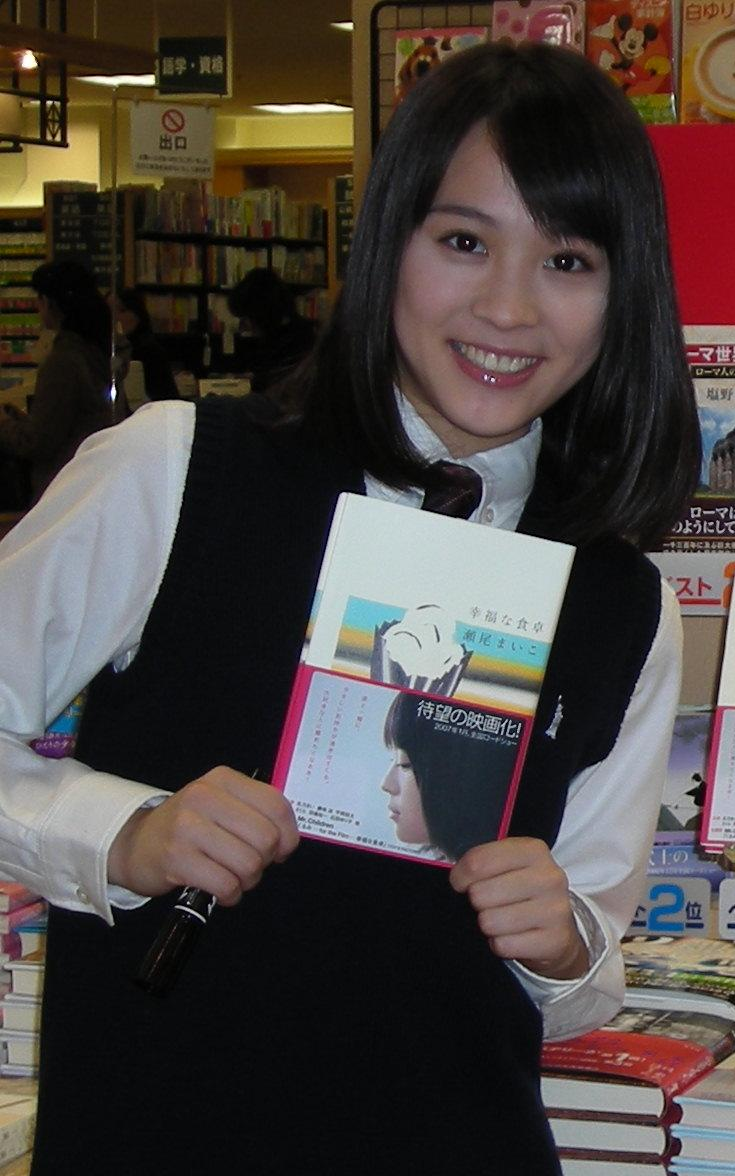
- Kitano in December 2006
- Born: March 15, 1991 (age 35); Yokosuka, Kanagawa, Japan
- Occupation: Actress
- Years active: 2005–present
- Agent: Foster agency
- Musical career
- Genres: J-pop; R&B
- Instrument: Vocals
- Years active: 2007–present
- Label: Avex Trax

Kie Kitano (北乃 きい, Kitano Kii; born March 15, 1991) is a Japanese actress.

== Career ==
Kitano was born in Kanagawa Prefecture, and is a former member of the celebrity girls futsal team Miss Magazine. In 2005, Kitano won a Miss Magazine Award, becoming the youngest (age 14) to receive that award. In 2007, Kitano was chosen for the first time star in the drama Life. To properly portray her character, Kitano saved up and bought every volume of the manga on which the drama is based. With Happy Dining Table, she has won 31st Japan Academy Award in the New Actor category. In February 2008, she has also won the 29th Yokohama Film Festival with the same film. After acting in Life and Kofuku no Shokutaku, she was chosen to appear in the promotional video for the single released on October 10, 2007 by Little. Between December 2007 and January 2008, she was chosen as the third cheering manager for Japan's High School Soccer Tournament, following Maki Horikita and Yui Aragaki. She was nominated for Best Supporting Actress Award at Milano Film Festival in 2014 for her impressive portrayal of a music producer's assistant in "The Tenor Lirico Spinto."

== Filmography ==
=== Dramas ===
- 14 Sai no Haha (2006)
- Junjo Kirari (2006)
- Life (2007)
- Taiyo to Umi no Kyoshitsu (2008)
- Nagareboshi (2010)
- You Kame's Cicada (2010)
- Toilet no Kamisama (2011)
- School (2011)
- Cleopatra Ladies -Eternal Desire for Beauty (2012)
- Gintama Mitsuba Arc (2017), Mitsuba
- Konuka Ame (2017), Osumi
- Natsuzora (2019)
- Burn the House Down (2023), Kurea
- Shiawase wa Tabete Nete Mate (2025), Riku Sorihashi

=== Movies ===
- Yubisaki kara Sekai wo (2006)
- Happy Dining Table (2007) – starring
- Speed Master (2007)
- Spider-Man 3 (2007) – Mary Jane Watson (voice-over for Kirsten Dunst)
- GeGeGe no Kitaro Sennen Noroi Uta (2008) as Kaede Hiramoto
- Love Fight (2008) – starring
- Postman (2008)
- Half Way (2009)
- Pokémon: Arceus and the Jewel of Life – Sheena (voice, 2009)
- Bandage (2010)
- Bushido Sixteen (2010)
- Tokyo Story (2013)
- Jōkyō Monogatari (2013)
- The Tenor Lirico Spinto (2014)
- I Don't Have Many Friends (2014)
- Teacher And Stray Cat (2015)
- Tap The Last Show (2017)
- Sengoku Girl and Kendō Boy (2020)
- Oshorin (2023)
- Teppen no Ken (2024)
- Kill Your Tears, Okiharu (2026)

=== Photobooks ===
- First Step (2007)
- Kitano Moyō (北乃模様) (2008)

=== Promotional videos ===
- "I Can See Clearly Now" by Beat Crusaders (2005)
- "Pink Candy -the movie-" by Kotaro Oshio (2007)
- "Yume no Sei" (夢のせい) by Little (2007)
- "Kibō no Uta/Kaze" (希望の唄／風) by Funky Monkey Babys (2008)

== Discography ==
(All released under Avex Group unless otherwise noted.)

=== Albums ===
- Shin (心) (2011-04-13)
- Can You Hear Me? (2012-03-14)

=== Singles ===
- "Sakura Saku" (サクラサク) (2010-02-24) No. 7, 33,479 copies sold
- "Hanataba" (花束) (2010-08-11)
- "Kizuna" (絆) (2011-03-02)
- "Darl:orz" (2012-01-18)

=== Chakuuta ===
- "Sakura Mau" (桜舞う) (2007.01.27)

== Awards and nominations ==
Year	Award	Category	Work(s)	Result	Ref.
2008	29th Yokohama Film Festival	Best New Talent	Happy Dining Table	Won	
2008	31st Japan Academy Film Prize	Newcomer of the Year	Happy Dining Table	Won	
