= Nancy Andrew =

American Japanologist (1947–1998)

- Born: August 17, 1947; Dallas, Texas
- Died: November 29, 1998 (aged 51); Tokyo
- Education: Indiana University Bloomington; Waseda University; Harvard Yenching Institute
- Occupation: Japanese-English translator
- Known for: English translation of Ryū Murakami's novel, Almost Transparent Blue

Linda Nancy Andrew (August 17, 1947 – November 29, 1998) was the English-language translator of Japanese author Ryū Murakami's highly acclaimed novel, Almost Transparent Blue, which had won the Akutagawa Prize in 1976.

Born in Dallas, Texas, Andrew was the only child of Dr. Warren Andrew (1910–1982), who later chaired the Department of Anatomy at the Indiana University School of Medicine in Indianapolis, and Nancy Valerie Miellmier Andrew (1914–1993), later a secretary with the Indiana State Anatomical Board.

Her interest in Japanese language and culture was kindled when she traveled to Japan with her parents just before her thirteenth birthday in 1960. Graduating from Shortridge High School in Indianapolis in 1965, she studied East Asian languages at Indiana University in Bloomington and Waseda University in Tokyo.

After receiving an honors degree from Indiana in 1969, she began graduate study at the Harvard Yenching Institute, where her faculty adviser was Edwin O. Reischauer, former United States Ambassador to Japan, and where she was an editor of Stone Lion Review, published by the East Asian Graduate Students Colloquium.

While doing research for her doctoral dissertation on the feminist movement in Japan, Andrew abandoned her academic studies to work as a translator for NHK, the Japan Broadcasting Corporation. Her translation of Murakami's surrealistic novel of post-war life in Japan was published in 1977.
