= Piercing (novel) =

Novel by Ryū Murakami

- The Book's Cover
- Author: Ryū Murakami
- Language: English
- Genre: Psychological thriller
- Publisher: Bloomsbury Publishing
- Publication date: 7 January 2008
- Publication place: Japan
- Media type: Print Paperback
- Pages: 192 pp
- ISBN: 978-0-7475-9313-3
- OCLC: 173239023
- Preceded by: The World in Five Minutes From Now 1995
- Followed by: Kyoko 1995

Piercing is a novel by Ryū Murakami. Originally published in Japanese in 1994, it was translated and published in English by Bloomsbury Publishing in 2008. An American film adaptation starring Christopher Abbott and Mia Wasikowska, directed by Nicolas Pesce, was released in 2019.

== Overview ==
Piercing is set in Tokyo and follows Kawashima Masayuki trying to come to terms with his overwhelming desire to stab his infant child with an ice pick. He resolves to divert the impulse into an unsuspecting prostitute. However, as he begins to execute his meticulous crime everything, including his past, begins to unravel.

== Critical reception ==
"...a haunting Japanese version of a David Lynch nightmare" - Chris Petit, Guardian Book Review.

"Far from being a cheap gorefest, ‘Piercing’ handles its violence with controlled aplomb, making it seem a natural by-product of Tokyo’s economic dominance. The result is a brief and convincing narrative of a crime and its motivations. With simple language and vividly evoked images, the novel looks at a single moment of horror from every angle." - Ed King, Time Out Book Review.
