= Mayumi Asaka =

Japanese actress. (born 1955)

- 朝加 真由美
- Born: September 6, 1955 (age 70); Hokuto, Hokkaido, Japan
- Occupation: Actress
- Years active: 1973–present
- Spouse(s): Masaru Shinozuka (1986–2005 or 2006)
- Children: 2, including Mai Tezuka

Mayumi Asaka (朝加 真由美 or あさか まゆみ, Asaka Mayumi) (born September 6, 1955) is a Japanese actress. One of her television roles was as the ninja Sagiri in the jidaigeki Abarenbo Shogun.

As of 2005, she is still active in television commercials.

On August 31, 2006, she played a guest-star role in the prime-time series Shin Kasōken no Onna File 8 on TV Asahi. She also guest-starred in the episode of Mito Komon for broadcast on August 20, 2007 (season 37, episode 20). A year later, Mayumi appeared in a TV Tokyo Wednesday night mystery show, Ryokō Sakka Chaya Jirō #8.

== Filmography ==
=== Films ===
- The Last Hero (1982), Naoko Mikimoto
- Umi e, See You (1988), Erika Yokouchi
- The Complex (2013), Hitomi's mother
- Love and the Grand Tug-of-war (2021)
- Fragments of the Last Will (2022)
- Dr. Coto's Clinic 2022 (2022), Masayo Hoshino

=== Television ===
- Ultraman Taro (1973)
- The Emperor's Cook (1980), Mitsu
- Dr. Coto's Clinic (2003–06), Masayo Hoshino
- Last Friends (2008), Yoko Kishimoto
- Reach Beyond the Blue Sky (2021), Shibusawa Masa
- Tanabata no Kuni (2024), Sachiko's grandmother
- Shiawase wa Tabete Nete Mate (2025), Keiko Mugimaki
- The Ghost Writer's Wife (2025–26), Tatsu Ueno
