= Coin Locker Babies =

1995 novel by Ryū Murakami

- Front cover of the 1995 1st ed. English hardcover
- Author: Ryū Murakami
- Original title: コインロッカー・ベイビーズ
- Translator: Stephen Snyder
- Cover artist: Manabu Yamanaka
- Language: Japanese
- Genre: Postmodern novel
- Publisher: Kodansha International (JPN)
- Publication date: 1980 (1st edition)
- Publication place: Japan
- Media type: Print (Hardcover)
- Pages: 393 pp (English hardcover 1st edition, 1995)
- ISBN: 4-7700-1590-9 (English hardcover 1st edition, May 1995)
- OCLC: 32130835
- Dewey Decimal: 895.6/35 20
- LC Class: PL856.U696 K613 1995

Coin Locker Babies (コインロッカー・ベイビーズ, Koinrokkā Beibīzu) is a 1980 novel by Ryū Murakami about coin-operated-locker babies, translated into English by Stephen Snyder. The translation was published in 1995 by Kodansha (講談社 Kōdansha) International Ltd and republished in 2013 by Pushkin Press. A Bildungsroman novel, Coin Locker Babies is known for transcending genres, containing elements of social commentary, surrealism, dark comedy, philosophy, noir and horror.

== Plot summary ==
It is the surreal story of two boys, Hashi and Kiku, who were both abandoned by their mothers during infancy and locked in coin lockers at a Tokyo train station in the summer of 1972. Both boys become wards of a Catholic orphanage in Yokohama, where the tough and athletic Kiku comes to the defense of the slight, and often picked on, Hashi. They both experience difficulties, and are given mental treatment involving playing the sound of an in utero heartbeat to them, a sound they will later search for after having forgotten it.

They are adopted by foster parents, the Kuwayamas (the wife is Zainichi Korean), who live on an island off Kyushu. At the age of 16 both find themselves in a diseased urban wasteland in Tokyo named Toxitown. Hashi, whose voice has a profound effect on those who hear it, becomes a bisexual rock star, employed by an eccentric producer named D. Hashi falls in love with his (female) manager Neva and they marry. Kiku becomes a pole vaulter and, with his girlfriend Anemone, a model who has converted her condo into a swamp for her crocodile, searches for a substance named DATURA in order to take his revenge upon the city of Tokyo and destroy it. Along the way, however, in a search for Hashi's real mother, D finds a woman and arranges a meeting with Hashi on live television. Kiku watches and sees Hashi break down, and goes to help, but ends up shooting the woman, who is actually his own mother. He is sentenced to five years in prison.

While Kiku is in prison, Hashi's music career grows, but he starts going mad from the stress, eventually trying to kill Neva to try and hear the sound he heard as a child. While in prison, Kiku embarks on a naval training ship, which is caught up in a typhoon and has to put in to land, saving some Thai fishermen on the way. Here, he and some other prisoners, Hayashi and Nakakura, make an escape and are picked up by Anemone. They travel to the island of Garagi, where Kiku had read about a large quantity of DATURA being buried in the sea. They go to the dive site and find the DATURA, however Nakakura takes some in and attacks Kiku and Hayashi, killing Hayashi before Kiku kills him. Anemone and Kiku then "bomb" Tokyo with DATURA. The book ends with a scene of Hashi, now in a mental hospital, escaping to find the city destroyed. He takes in some DATURA and has an urge to destroy a woman he sees nearby, grabbing her by the mouth and trying to rip her apart, when he realises that she is his mother.

== Main characters ==
Kikuyuki Sekiguchi (関口菊之)

One of the two coin locker babies in the novel. His name is commonly shortened to just Kiku. "Sekiguchi" was the name his mother had written on the box before she left him in the locker. The name Kikuyuki came from a list used for naming abandoned children. He was placed in the Cherryfield Orphanage after being discovered, which is where he meets Hashi, who shares the same history. Kiku is the tougher of the two, often defending Hashi in the orphanage. He later goes on to be an excellent pole vaulter, but finds himself in Toxitown in search of DATURA.

Hashio Mizouchi (溝内橋男)

The second of the coin locker babies. Most often referred to as just Hashi (ハシ). He was found in the locker after a blind man's dog began howling at the smell coming from inside the locker. He is the thinner and weaker of the coin locker babies, and as a child would create strange sets out of common objects. He also finds himself in Toxitown, where he is to become a singer under his manager, D.

The Kuwayamas

Shuichi and Kazuyo, the husband and wife who eventually adopt both Kiku and Hashi. Kazuyo is of Korean origin. They live on a small island off the coast of Kyushu.

Anemone (アネモネ)

A model in Tokyo who becomes an interest for Kiku. She has turned her condo into living quarters for her crocodile, Gulliver. She eventually accompanies Kiku on his quest to find DATURA and is supportive of his idea to destroy Tokyo.

Mr. D (ミスターＤ, Misutā D)

Commonly just called 'D', which is said to stand either for Director or, as D insists, Dracula. D is Hashi's manager who is preparing to debut him as a singer, using his unique background for publicity.

Neva (ニヴァ, Nivua)

Neva is a thirty-eight-year-old woman who lost both her breasts to cancer. She starts off as Hashi's stylist but later becomes his manager. Consequently, they start falling for each other and are married. She later becomes pregnant.

Kimie Numata

Kiku's real mother. Mr. D finds her through an investigator after charging him to secretly look for Hashi's mother. However, Hashi finds out his mother is already deceased so the woman can only be Kiku's mother. An altered Kiku tries to shoot everyone in sight and ends up shooting Kimie, accidentally but fatally.

== Film adaptation ==
A film version began development in 2005, with a screenplay by Sean Lennon to be directed by Michele Civetta. The film was originally to star Val Kilmer, Tadanobu Asano, Asia Argento, and Lennon, but production never got off the ground.

== Production ==
In an interview conducted by Steve Erickson, later collected by Ralph McCarthy for Kyoto Journal in 2011, Murakami revealed the original idea that drove the novel:

“In the years before writing the novel there were several cases in Japan of babies abandoned in coin lockers. Most were already dead, and the parents or whoever it was were looking for a place to dispose of the corpses. But some of the babies were still alive, and some even survived. What would happen if these babies grew up and discovered that they had been abandoned like that? Wouldn’t it be easy for them to feel a tremendous hatred for the world? Wouldn’t it be easy for them to want to destroy it?”

== Criticism ==
Japanese society in Murakami’s work represents a kind of compulsory collective, a totalitarian system with its power center in Tokyo, which undermines the identity and self-esteem of the individual while bringing out the lowest instincts. The Japanese myth of the caring mother is dismantled, as is the patriarchal order that demands the submission and functioning of the individual. Rebellion here is followed by resignation, and personal development falls victim to uniformity. Only total destruction helps: Murakami lets his protagonists remain faithful to their no-future mission.

— Lisette Gebhardt in: literaturkritik.de

The controversy over the treatment of child abuse and the depiction of violence shown in the novel has also been addressed by the author:

"It’s not that something is ‘happening’ (child abuse) but that these are things that have always happened in society and have begun to emerge. Child abuse and the cycle of violence are global problems, not things that happen only in Japan.”

When asked about his connection with nihilism, in an interview conducted by Joseph George for Vice in 2013, Murakami stated:

"I also have problems with the world I see around me. In the case of wounded young people, those with creativity may be able to channel that anger or destructive energy into writing or music. But if not, they tend to move toward violence or even terrorism. If the destructive energy comes with a kind of moral charge, then it can turn into a revolution."

== Legacy ==
- The creators of the video game Silent Hill 4: The Room stated in an interview that this book was an influence for that game.
- Japanese rock band The Pillows were originally called "The Coin Locker Babies", after the title of the novel. The name was used from 1986 to 1988 before a major shift in the band's line-up.
- Japanese rock band Urbangarde titled a 2015 song "Coin Locker Babies" after the novel.
