= Kimiko Uehara =

Manga artist

Kimiko Uehara 上原 きみ子
- Born: Kimiko (君子) Murakami (村上); April 25, 1946 (age 80) Gifu
- Area: Manga artist
- Pseudonym: Kimiko Kaneda
- Notable works: Lovely Mari-chan

Kimiko Uehara (上原 きみ子, Uehara Kimiko; real name Murakami Kimiko) is a prominent Japanese shōjo and josei manga artist. She is best known for shōjo series such as Maiko no Uta ("Maiko's Poem"), Lovely Mari-chan, Marybell, Honoo no Romance, Lolly no Seishun, and Yumedokei ("Sweet Memory"). She received the 1990 Shogakukan Manga Award for children's manga for Lovely Mari-chan. Uehara is cited by Naoko Takeuchi, author of Sailor Moon, as an influence, especially her dialog in Lolly no Seishun and Honoo no Romance.

Her current manga is Inochi no Utsuwa, published by Akita Shoten since 1991 in the josei magazine For Mrs..

== Overview ==
Her first work "Flower of Black Cosmos" debuted in 1965 as a rental comic under the pen name of Kimiko Kaneda at age 19. In 1968, She began working for a commercial magazine as "Kumiko Uehara" when "Shoken Monogatari" was published in the November issue of "Ribon" (Shueisha). She published 2 works in "Ribon" related magazines. Uehara, who wanted to draw a Drama, submitted to Shōjo Comic (Shogakukan) and was accepted. In 1969 her first serial series "Aiba Enzeru" was published. After that, popular works continued in the 1970s, starting with "Rune no Seishun" serialized in "Weekly Girls Comic" followed by "Lolly no Seishun" and "Honou no Romansu". In the 1980s her popular Mari-chan series was published expanding the field of activity to magazines primarily targeting elementary school students.

From the 1990s on, she changed her pen name to Kimiko Uehara, and also began writing ladies comics. Above all, the long-running work Inochi no Utsuwa ("Life Vessel"), published in "For Mrs." (Akita) was adapted into a drama in 1998. As of November 2020, the manga contains 83 volumes.

A wide range of subjects, including horseback riding, figure skating, and ballet, are featured in her work. They have been characterized as Drama, Romance, School life, Sports and Comedy. Her work has been published by major Japanese publishers such as Shogakukan, Shueisha, Kodansha, Akita Shoten, Hakusensha. They have variously published girls' comics (Shōjo), children's comics, and ladies comics (Josei).

== Comics ==
In the latter half of the 1990s, almost all publications Uehara had works in such as "Flower Comics" (Shogakukan) went out of print, which drove up their prices at used book stores. However, in the 2000s a few works were re-issued as paperback comics. As of 2014, except for certain works (such as from the rental comic era or the Uehara Kimiko Meisakushū ["Kimiko Uehara Masterpiece Collection"]), her work is becoming more widely available. Even so, there are still many works that have not been reissued.

== Main works ==
- Shōken Monogatari ("Shōken Story") (1968, commercial magazine debut)
- Aiba Enzeru ("My Horse Angel") (1969)
- Rune no Seishun (1970-1971)
- Capri no Shinju (1972)
- Tenshi no Serenāde (Weekly Shōjo Comic / Shōgakukan, 1972, No. 48-1973, No. 31)
- Honou no Romansu ("Blazing Romance") (1975-1977)
- Maiko no Uta ("Maiko's Poem") Maiko's poem (1977-1981)
- Marīberu ("Marie Bell") (1978-1980)
- Ha-i! Mari-chan (1980-1984, see the "Mari-chan" series)
- Seishun Hakusho ("Youth's White Paper") (1981-1983)
- Yumedokei ("Sweet Memory") (1982-1984)
- Viva! Akane-chan (1983-1984)
- Kochira ai! Ōtō seyo (1984-1986)
- Lovely Mari-chan (1984-1989)
- Happy Mari-chan (1986-1991)
- Gin no Toe Shoes ("Silver toe shoes") (1987-1991)
- Ai no Arabesuku (1994-1995)
- Inochi no Utsuwa (1991–present)
