= Inochi no Utsuwa =

Japanese manga series by Kimiko Uehara

いのちの器
- Manga
- Written by: Kimiko Uehara
- Published by: Akita Shoten
- Imprint: Akita Lady's Comics DX
- Magazine: For Mrs.
- Original run: 1991 – present
- Volumes: 98 (as of November 2025)
- Television drama
- Original network: Fuji TV
- Original run: 5 October 1998 – 28 December 1998
- Episodes: 59

Inochi no Utsuwa (Japanese: いのちの器; lit. "Vessel of Life") is a Japanese manga series written and illustrated by Kimiko Uehara. The story follows the life of Kyoko, an obstetrician and gynecologist practicing in a small town in Nagano, Japan. Inochi no Utsuwa has been serialized in Akita Shoten's josei manga magazine For Mrs. since 1991 and collected in 98 tankōbon volumes as of November 2025. It was adapted into a live-action Japanese television drama series that aired for 59 episodes on Fuji TV in 1998.

== Characters ==
Kyoko Ariyoshi (有吉（山野）響子, Ariyoshi (Yamano) Kyoko)
Portrayed by: Azusa Watanabe
Akira Ariyoshi (有吉晃, Ariyoshi Akira)
Portrayed by: Shinichiro Okano
Masashi Ariyoshi (有吉（佐伯）雅志, Ariyoshi (Saeki) Masashi)
Yuko Hattori (服部（有吉）優子, Hattori (Ariyoshi) Yuko)
Momoko Ariyoshi (有吉桃子, Ariyoshi Momoko)
Hotaka Ariyoshi (有吉穂高, Ariyoshi Hotaka)
Goro Ariyoshi (有吉五郎, Ariyoshi Goro)
Haruna Ariyoshi (有吉春菜, Ariyoshi Haruna)
Yoriko Koishikawa (小石川頼子, Koishikawa Yoriko)

== Reception ==
In 2004, Inochi no Utsuwa was one of the titles recommended by the jury of the manga division at the 8th Japan Media Arts Festival.
