= Border Line (film) =

- DVD cover
- Directed by: Sang-il Lee
- Written by: Sang-il Lee; Hajime Matsura
- Produced by: Mayumi Amano
- Starring: Tetsu Sawaki; Yumi Asō; Ken Mitsuishi; Jun Murakami; Ayaka Maeda; Kanako Fukaura; Yoshiyuki Morishita
- Cinematography: Shin Hayasaka
- Edited by: Aoyama Masafumi
- Music by: Ayuo
- Release date: 2002
- Running time: 118 minutes
- Country: Japan
- Language: Japanese

Border Line is a 2002 Japanese drama film, and the feature film debut of film director Sang-il Lee. It observes the lives of three unrelated characters, a son, a father and a mother, each of whom has a troubled family background.

The film is Sang-il Lee's feature debut, after his medium-length debut Chong in 2000.

== Plot ==
Matsuda, 17, is being uncooperative at school. A radio broadcast reveals that he then murders his father and runs away on his bike. The next morning a drunken taxi driver, Kurosawa runs him over in his taxi. Feeling guilty about the accident, he is soon driving Matsuda to northern Japan. Matsuda remains uncommunicative and unfriendly.

Aikawa is a convenience store clerk with a son at elementary school and a husband who has abandoned the family after losing his job. Her son fakes illness to avoid school. She later discovers that he is being bullied. She becomes increasingly stressed by financial and family worries, and eventually attempts a bank robbery and kidnaps one of her son's bullies to teach him a lesson.

The middle-aged Yakuza finds that his partner has stolen his boss's money to pay for an operation for his daughter. He is given one week to find his partner and recover the money. He finds and reluctantly executes him, only to steal the money himself and give it to the widow.

He saves Matsuda from suicide, and, recognizing another troubled person on the run, invites him to stay with him at the deserted house he is using. The pair form a friendship like father and son. However, the gangsters track him down and kill him.

Matsuda goes to Hakodate, Hokkaido to trace the Yakuza's estranged daughter, now earning money as a prostitute.

At the end of the film, Kurosawa appears in Hokkaido, carrying a middle-aged female passenger in his taxi. She meets Matsuda on the beach. She may be his mother.

== Cast ==
- Tetsu Sawaki as Shuji Matsuda, 17-year-old high school student
- Yumi Asō as Aikawa, convenience store clerk
- Ken Mitsuishi as middle-aged yakuza)
- Jun Murakami as Kurosawa, the taxi driver

== Reception ==
Time Out praised the film, stating, Maintaining a semi-detached empathy with the characters, Lee suggests that the disintegration of the family is at the root of the problems. The all-star cast worked for peanuts because they loved the script; and the young director marshals the ensemble with such skill you'd think he'd been doing it for years."
