= Piercing (film) =

- Theatrical release poster
- Directed by: Nicolas Pesce
- Screenplay by: Nicolas Pesce
- Based on: Piercing by Ryū Murakami
- Produced by: Jacob Wasserman; Josh Mond; Antonio Campos; Schuyler Weiss
- Starring: Christopher Abbott; Mia Wasikowska; Laia Costa; Maria Dizzia; Marin Ireland; Wendell Pierce
- Cinematography: Zack Galler
- Edited by: Sofía Subercaseaux
- Production companies: Paradise City; YL Pictures Co; Borderline Films; Memento Films
- Distributed by: Universal Pictures; Greenwich Entertainment
- Release dates: January 20, 2018 (Sundance); February 1, 2019 (United States)
- Running time: 81 minutes
- Country: United States
- Language: English
- Box office: $149,211

Piercing is a 2018 American psychological horror-thriller film written and directed by Nicolas Pesce, based on the novel of the same name by Ryū Murakami. It stars Christopher Abbott, Mia Wasikowska, and Laia Costa, and features Maria Dizzia, Marin Ireland, and Wendell Pierce in supporting roles.

Piercing had its world premiere at the Sundance Film Festival on January 20, 2018 and was theatrically released on February 1, 2019, by Universal Pictures, to generally positive reviews from critics.

== Plot ==
Reed stands over his infant daughter with an ice pick, while his wife sleeps across the room unaware. He has an overwhelming desire to stab his daughter with the ice pick, but is able to push the urge down in the moment. Later, while calming the baby, she looks up at him and says, "You know what you have to do, right?". He then decides that he must enact his murderous impulses upon a prostitute, so as to protect his daughter from himself. He has convinced his wife that he is going on a business trip. However, he actually intends to rent a hotel room, hire the services of a sex worker, and go through with his meticulous plot of killing the person with an ice pick, while getting away with the crime.

Reed makes his way to a hotel at the beginning of the night. Once he enters the room, he begins a rehearsal of his plans. He continually wipes fingerprints and times himself in a notebook after falling unconscious by chloroform. However, when the appointed time arrives, Jackie has arrived instead of his intended victim. She brings with her a collection of kinky fetish gear and a sadistic impulse. After a bad first encounter, she hides in the bathroom, and Reed nervously awaits. He grows impatient and enters the bathroom after Jackie ignores his calls. Upon entry, he sees her repeatedly stabbing herself with a pair of scissors in the leg. He overpowers her and carries her to the bed where she passes out, most likely due to the pills she swallowed earlier. He quickly bandages her and ditches his plans to murder. He grabs his belongings and attempts to leave the hotel, but returns after seeing Jackie leaving the room undressed and bleeding.

Reed decides to dress and transport Jackie to the hospital, but on the taxi ride there, Jackie whispers that she "was onto him", suggesting she knew of his plans to kill her. She asks him to wait for her at the hospital, and he promises he will. While waiting, Reed imagines his wife giving him advice and being a voice of reason, suggesting either Jackie does not know what his true intentions are, and he still may be able to kill her, or that she played coy and is alerting the hospital staff and will get Reed imprisoned. He reasons that she does not know and she returns excited to see him still there.

After establishing that trust, they go to Jackie's apartment. Jackie cordially offers dinner, but Reed is quiet and appears uninterested. Jackie attempts seduction which ultimately leads to them lying in her bed. They continually speak in double meaning, either conveying ideas of sex or murder, yet neither knows which intention the other has. Reed resolves that she wants him to kill her, and he gets up to grab his gear from across the room. Yet Jackie is confused, thinking he wanted sex. As he moves towards her, she again suggests dinner. They eat, and Reed begins to suffer from violent and nightmarish hallucinations, notably of his domineering mother who tortures him with a lit cigarette. Jackie explains she spiked his soup with narcotics and he falls into a state of unconsciousness. He moans his wife's name and this infuriates Jackie, leading to her beating him with a can opener. Towards the end, Reed gains the upper hand and Jackie still does not believe he is a killer. She allows him to tie her up, thinking he will finally have sex with her. Yet he pulls out an ice pick and right as he attempts to stab her, he passes out once more. Jackie unties herself and looks through his bags, she finds his notebook and reads the sadistic plans he had intended for her.

When Reed awakes the following morning, he finds himself bound and gagged. Jackie sits at her mirror, and pierces her nipple. She then climbs on top of him, readying the ice pick. As she raises it, he wails, and she hesitates. She ungags him and they stare at each other. After a beat, Reed asks the same question she did before he attempted to murder her, "Can we eat first?"

== Cast ==
- Christopher Abbott as Reed
- Mia Wasikowska as Jackie
- Laia Costa as Mona, Reed's wife
- Marin Ireland as Reed's mother
- Maria Dizzia as Chevonne
- Wendell Pierce as the doctor

== Production ==
In February 2017, it was announced Christopher Abbott, Mia Wasikowska, Maria Dizzia, Marin Ireland and Wendell Pierce had joined the cast of the film, with Nicolas Pesce directing from a screenplay written by himself, based upon the novel of the same name by Ryū Murakami. Josh Mond, Antonio Campos, Schuyler Weiss, Jacob Wasserman, will produce the film, while Sean Durkin, Max Born, Avi Stern, Emilie Georges, Naima Abed, Al Di, Phil Hoelting will serve as executive producers under their Boderline Films, Memento Films, Paradise City, YL Pictures banners, respectively. Production concluded that same month.

== Release ==
The film had its world premiere at the Sundance Film Festival on January 20, 2018. Universal Pictures acquired distribution rights to the film in May 2018. It was released on February 1, 2019.

=== Reception ===
On the review aggregator website Rotten Tomatoes, 72% of 101 critics' reviews are positive, with an average rating of 6.3/10. The critical consensus states, "Stylish with a sadistic streak, Piercing pairs gripping lead performances with a smartly macabre story that delivers unpredictable thrills." Metacritic, which uses a weighted average, assigned the film a score of 63 out of 100, based on 23 critics, indicating "generally favorable" reviews.
