= Keiko Tobe =

Japanese manga artist

- Born: 30 July 1957
- Died: 28 January 2010 (aged 52)
- Area: manga
- Notable works: With the Light
- Awards: Japan Media Arts Festival Awards Excellence Prize

Keiko Tobe (戸部 けいこ, Tobe Keiko; 30 July 1957 – 28 January 2010) was a Japanese manga artist who wrote primarily josei manga. She was best known for creating With the Light, which won an Excellence Prize in the Japan Media Arts Festival Awards in 2004 from the Japanese Agency for Cultural Affairs and inspired a television drama.

== Biography ==
Tobe was born in Hyōgo Prefecture. When she was in second grade, she made her first manga, The Three Ghosts. It was about three ghosts with different personalities having slapstick adventures in their owner's mansion. She then decided to be a manga artist. Her older brother also wanted to be a manga artist and he submitted all his manga artwork to Garo before shifting to oil painting and passing down his tools to her.

After graduating, she married and had two sons. When her younger son was in kindergarten, he had a male classmate with autism. Later, she met the autistic boy's mother who said she wanted him to be a 'cheerful working adult'. This inspired Tobe to create With the Light, a manga dealing with autistic children. At that time, there were very few manga about disabilities and they never received attention. With the Light changed perspectives on this issue.

Tobe died of mesothelioma on January 28, 2010, after going on hiatus from With the Light.
