= Kyoko (novel) =

1995 novel by Ryu Murakami

- Novel cover
- Author: Ryū Murakami
- Original title: キョウコ
- Language: Japanese
- Genre: Fiction
- Publisher: Shueisha
- Publication date: 1995
- Publication place: Japan
- Media type: Print
- Pages: 213
- ISBN: 4087740986
- OCLC: 34700067
- Preceded by: Piercing (novel)

Kyoko is a 1995 novel by Ryū Murakami. The book tells the story of a young woman who comes to New York City to find the Cuban-American GI who taught her to dance salsa. She ends up traveling throughout the United States to help her friend, who is dying of AIDS, see his family one last time, although he doesn't even remember her.

In the year 1996, a film was made from the story of this book, under the title Kyoko or, in English, Because of You, written and directed by the author, Ryū Murakami. The film was later released in the United States in the year 2000.

== Publishing history ==
- Publisher: Philippe Picquier (August 31, 2000). ISBN 2-87730-505-8.
