= 69 (novel) =

Novel by Ryū Murakami

- First English language edition
- Author: Ryu Murakami
- Original title: 69 sixty nine
- Translator: Ralph F. McCarthy
- Language: Japanese
- Genre: Roman à clef, Novel
- Published: 1987 (Kodansha Europe) (Eng. trans.)
- Publication place: Japan
- Media type: Print (Hardback & Paperback)
- Pages: 192 pp (Eng. trans first edition, hardback)
- ISBN: 4-7700-1736-7 (Eng. trans first edition, hardback)
- OCLC: 28549113
- Dewey Decimal: 895.6/35 20
- LC Class: PL856.U696 S4813 1993

69 (シクスティナイン, Shikusutinain) is a roman à clef novel by Ryu Murakami. It was published first in 1987. It takes place in 1969, and tells the story of some high school students coming of age in an obscure Japanese city who try to mimic the counter-culture movements taking place in Tokyo and other parts of the world.

== Synopsis ==
Thirty-two-year-old narrator Kensuke Yazaki takes a nostalgic look back at the year 1969, when he was an ambitious and enthusiastic seventeen-year-old, living in Sasebo, in Nagasaki, where he gets into antics with his equally ambitious and enthusiastic best friends, Iwase and Adama. Their priorities are girls, cinema, music, literature, pop culture, organizing a school festival to be called "The Morning Erection Festival", besting teachers and enemies, and finding a way to change the world somehow.

== Film, TV or theatrical adaptations ==
The 2004 film 69 is based on Murakami's novel.

== Release details ==
- 1987, Japan, ? (ISBN 4-08-772616-9), Pub date 1 August 1987, hardback (First edition)
- 1993, Europe ?, Kodansha Europe (ISBN 4-7700-1736-7), Pub date 1 September 1993, hardback (Eng. trans.)
- 1995, Europe ?, Kodansha Europe (ISBN 4-7700-1951-3), Pub date ? March 1995, paperback (Eng. trans.)
- 2006, Europe ?, Kodansha Europe (ISBN 4-7700-3013-4), Pub date 7 February 2006, paperback (Eng. trans.)
- 2004, Germany, Suhrkamp Verlag (ISBN 3-518-45633-4), Pub date 30 September 2004, paperback
