= Tokyo Decadence =

1992 film

- Tokyo Decadence DVD cover
- Directed by: Ryū Murakami
- Screenplay by: Ryū Murakami
- Based on: Topaz by Ryū Murakami
- Produced by: Chosei Funahara
- Starring: Miho Nikaido; Sayoko Amano; Yayoi Kusama; Chie Sema
- Cinematography: Tadashi Aoki
- Edited by: Kazuki Katashima
- Music by: Ryuichi Sakamoto
- Distributed by: Cinema Epoch
- Release date: 6 January 1992 (Japan)
- Running time: 113 minutes
- Country: Japan
- Language: Japanese
- Box office: $277,845

Tokyo Decadence (Japanese: トパーズ, Hepburn: Topāzu) is a 1992 Japanese pink film. This erotic film was directed by Ryū Murakami (村上 龍) with music by Ryuichi Sakamoto (坂本 龍一 ). The film was shot and completed during 1991 and released in the start of 1992. It stars Miho Nikaido (二階堂 美穂) and is also referred to as Topaz, that title being both the translation of the original Japanese title and that of the Murakami story it is an adaptation of. Because of the cruel and graphic nature of this film, it has been banned in several countries such as Australia and South Korea. Shimada Masahiko (島田 雅彦) also makes an appearance in this film. The story follows Ai (愛; lit. "love"), the submissive and lovesick prostitute who goes about her trade with misery and is being abused by hedonists and criminals while trying to find some sort of appeasement away from the fact that her lover is currently married.

== Plot ==
Ai, a timid 22-year-old college student in Tokyo, works as a prostitute for an exclusive escort agency that caters to wealthy, perverted men. To please her clients, Ai has to play out elaborate fantasy scenarios involving sexual humiliation and light sadomasochism/bondage.

Ai visits a fortune-teller, played by Yayoi Kusama, who advises her to find a "pink stone", and then fashion it into a ring. The fortune teller also advises Ai to put a telephone directory under her television, and to avoid a gallery in the east. When she later loses the ring she risks her life to recover it.

Ai shows an emotional connection to one of her clients, another sex worker who is a female dominant and who Ai clearly admires. She confides to this client that she has unrequited love for the gallery artist, and Ai's client tells her that she must live life to the fullest otherwise she will be filled with regrets. She tells Ai that she must confront this part of her life then she can move forward as her future will be hers.

Taking the advice of her female client, and an unidentified drug which her client gave her to provide her with the courage of lions, she becomes dangerously inebriated and fails in an attempt to meet her ex lover.

She meets the artist's wife who sings for her, saying that it's a great audience even though Ai is the only other person present. The wife says that they were previously rivals but because the artist is suffering from dementia the rivalry is over and they can be friends. The wife is then collected by her nurse who says that if anything happens to the wife she will be held responsible. After Ai attempts to break into the artist's house the police are called and take her into custody. She is rescued from the police by the artist's wife who is said to have once been a great singer but is now crazy.

Throughout the film, Ai's movements have been timid and stiff and her posture demure. After the credits there is a sequence of her dancing on stage boldly and fluidly thus finalizing her growth in to her new future.

== Cast ==
- Miho Nikaido as Ai
- Sayoko Amano as Saki
- Yayoi Kusama as Fortune Teller
- Chie Sema as Opera Lady

== Release ==
The film was banned by the Ontario Film Review Board. David Cronenberg protested the board's decision stating that "even by their own rules, which they invented, it's clearly acceptable".

== Reception ==
On the review aggregator website Rotten Tomatoes, 71% of 7 critics' reviews are positive, with an average rating of 6.7/10. Metacritic, which uses a weighted average, assigned the film a score of 48 out of 100, based on 14 critics, indicating "mixed or average" reviews.

Writing for the Guardian, Peter Preston described the film as "not, by any standard, entertainment. It is, from time to time, almost too agonising to watch: but at least, in its unrelenting, occasionally powerful way, it shows how sex and violence can sometimes, in their capacity for degradation, be brothers under the crawly skin."

== See also ==
- Sadism and masochism in fiction
- Love & Pop
