= Tetsu Sawaki =

Japanese actor (born 1982)

- Born: August 24, 1982 (age 43); Osaka, Japan

Akihiro Kuremura (呉村 哲弘, Kuremura Akihiro), (born August 24, 1982) is a Japanese former actor and former singer, known by his stage name Tetsu Sawaki (沢木 哲, Sawaki Tetsu) whilst under the management of Johnny & Associates, Inc.. Kuremura currently works as a tax advisor at his hometown of Osaka, Japan.

== Filmography ==
- Audition (1999)
- A Closing Day (閉じる日) (2000)
- Boogiepop and Others (2000)
- GO! (2001)
- All About Lily Chou-Chou (2001)
- Hush! (ハッシュ!) (2001)
- Gaichu (害虫) (2001)
- Ashita wa kitto (あしたはきっと・・・) (2001)
- Border Line (2002)
- Bright Future (2003)

== Television ==
1. Africa Nights (アフリカの夜) (1999)
