= Nicolas Pesce =

American film director

- Born: January 18, 1990 (age 35); New York City, U.S.
- Occupation(s): Director, screenwriter
- Known for: The Eyes of My Mother; Piercing; The Grudge

Nicolas Pesce (/pɛʃ/ PESH) (born January 18, 1990) is an American filmmaker. He is best known for directing the horror films The Eyes of My Mother (2016), Piercing (2018) and The Grudge (2019).

== Life and career ==
Nicolas Pesce was born in New York City to an Italian-Brazilian family. His theatrical debut, The Eyes of My Mother, premiered in the NEXT section at the 2016 Sundance Film Festival on January 22, 2016. Pesce's next feature film, Piercing then premiered at the 2018 Sundance Film Festival on January 20, 2018. Pesce's third feature film, The Grudge, the fourth installment in the American The Grudge series was released on January 3, 2020 in the United States, having begun its international rollout on December 31, 2019. In January 2023, Pesce's latest film, Visitation, was in production in Ireland with Olivia Cooke and Isla Johnston starring.

== Filmography ==
=== Feature films ===
Year	Title	Director	Writer	Notes
2016	The Eyes of My Mother	Yes	Yes	Directorial debut; also editor
2018	Piercing	Yes	Yes	
2019	The Grudge	Yes	Yes	
TBA	Visitation	Yes	No	Post-production

=== Short films ===
Year	Title	Director	Writer	Notes
2018	The Caretaker	Yes	Yes	co-directed with Adam Donald and Jacob Wasserman

=== Television ===
Year	Title	Director	Writer	Notes
2020	Monsterland	Yes	No	Episode: "Palacios, TX"
