= List of Japanese films of 1991 =

A list of films released in Japan in 1991 (see 1991 in film).

Japanese films released in 1991
Title	Director	Cast	Genre	Notes
!<Ai·Oo>	Yukihiko Tsutsumi	Kyohei Shibata, Kazukiyo Nishikiori, Kenji Otsuki	—	
964 Pinocchio	Shozin Fukui		Science fiction	
Cho shojo REIKO	Takao Okawara	Arisa Mizuki, Ken Osawa, Wakako Shimazaki	—	
Deer Friend	Yukihiro Sawada	Tomokazu Miura, Midori Kanazawa, Teppei Yamada	—	
Denei shoujo	Ryu Kaneda	Ken Osawa, Kaori Sakagami, Hiromi Hamaguchi	—	
Doraemon: Nobita's Dorabian Nights	Tsutomu Shibayama, Daikichiro Kusube		—	Animated film
Domo Arigato			3-D travelogue	
Dragon Ball Z: Lord Slug				
Dragon Ball Z: Cooler's Revenge				
Eyecatch Junction	Takashi Miike	Lisa Tachibana, Hiroko Nakajima, Aiko Asano	—	Direct-to-video release
Fushigi no umi no Nadia	Kaoru Umeno		—	Animated film
Godzilla vs. King Ghidorah	Kazuki Ōmori	Kosuke Toyohara, Anna Nakagawa, Megumi Odaka	—	
Happy Wedding	Yoshimitsu Morita	Yoshiko Mita, Yuki Saito, Toshiaki Karasawa	—	
Haroo Kiteii-Maho no mori Ohimesama	Hidemi Kubo		—	Animated film
Hiruko the Goblin	Shinya Tsukamoto	Kenji Sawada, Masaki Kudo, Rin Miyama		
Journey of Honor	Gordon Hessler	Sho Kosugi, David Essex, Toshiro Mifune	Jidai-geki	
Kerokero Keroppi no sanjushi	Masami Hata		—	Animated film
Lady Hunter	Takashi Miike	Yoshie Kashiwabara, Ko Murata, Naomi Morinaga	—	Direct-to-video release
Manatsu no Chikyū	Osamu Murakami	Kikuchi Kenichirō, Eri Fukatsu, Michitaka Tsutsui	Drama	
Misty	Toshiharu Ikeda	Toshiyuki Nagashima, Miho Tsumiki, Yoshie Ichige	—	
Mobile Suit Gundam F91	Yoshiyuki Tomino		Science fiction	Animated film
My Sons	Yoji Yamada	Rentarō Mikuni, Masatoshi Nagase, Emi Wakui		
My Soul Is Slashed	Shusuke Kaneko	Ken Ogata, Tatsuro Morimoto, Narumi Yasuda	Vampire	
Nami no kazudake dakishimete	Yasuo Baba	Miho Nakayama, Yūji Oda, Tetsuya Bessho	—	
Only Yesterday	Isao Takahata		—	Animated film
Penta no sora	Takashi Nagata	Norisuke Yamashita, Shino Ikenami, Keisuke Yaosaka	—	
The Princess and the Goblin	József Gémes	Joss Ackland, Claire Bloom, Roy Kinnear, Sally Ann Marsh, Rik Mayall, Peggy Mount, Peter Murray, Victor Spinetti, Mollie Sugden, Frank Rozelaar Green, William Hootkins, Maxine Howe, Steve Lyons, Robin Lyons	Animated fantasy	British-Hungarian-Japanese-American-Danish co-production
Rainbow Kids	Kihachi Okamoto	Tanie Kitabayashi, Toru Kazama, Katsuyasu Uchida	Comedy	
Rhapsody in August	Akira Kurosawa	Richard Gere, Sachiko Murase, Hidetaka Yoshioka	Drama	
Roujin Z	Hiroyuki Kitakubo		—	Animated film
A Scene at the Sea	Takeshi Kitano	Claude Maki, Hiroko Ohshima	Drama	
Shusho kusensen ijonashi	Shusuke Kaneko	Yūji Oda, Koji Matoba, Emi Wakui	—	
Strawberry Road	Koreyoshi Kurahara	Ken Matsudaira, Mako, Mariska Hargitay	—	
Taabo no ryugusei daitanken	Mikao Mitsuki		—	Animated film
Tora-san Confesses	Yoji Yamada	Kiyoshi Atsumi	Comedy	44th in the Otoko wa Tsurai yo series
Urusei Yatsura: Always, My Darling	Katsuhisa Yamada		Comedy, romance, science fiction	Animated film
Wow, The Kid Gang of Bandits	Keiichi Hara		—	Animated film
Yumeji	Seijun Suzuki	Kenji Sawada	Drama	
Zeiram	Keita Amamiya	Yuko Moriyama, Yukijiro Hotaro, Kunihiko Iida	—	

== See also ==
- 1991 in Japan
- 1991 in Japanese television

== Footnotes ==
=== References ===
- Galbraith IV, Stuart (1996). The Japanese Filmography: 1900 through 1994. McFarland. ISBN 0-7864-0032-3.
- Galbraith IV, Stuart (2008). The Toho Studios Story: A History and Complete Filmography. Scarecrow Press. ISBN 978-1461673743.
- Mes, Tom (2006). Agitator: The Cinema of Takashi Miike. FAB Press. ISBN 1903254418.
- Mes, Tom (2005). Iron Man. The Cinema of Shinya Tsukamoto. Fab Press. ISBN 1-903254-35-3.
