= We're No Angels =

We're No Angels or We Are No Angels may refer to:

- We're No Angels (1955 film), a 1955 film starring Humphrey Bogart
- We Are No Angels (1975 film), a 1975 film starring Michael Coby and Paul L. Smith
- We're No Angels (1989 film), a 1989 film starring Robert De Niro and Sean Penn
- We're No Angels (1993 film), a 1993 film directed by Takashi Miike
- We're No Angels 2, a 1993 film directed by Takashi Miike
- "We're No Angels", a 1988 song by John Farnham, later covered by Tina Arena

== See also ==
- We Are Not Angels
