= Mari's Prey =

Mari's Game
- Directed by: Keiichirō Yoshida
- Written by: Yōichi Maekawa; Keiichirō Yoshida; Nobuhisa Kodama
- Produced by: Kenji Ejiri; Matsugu Yamada
- Starring: Makiko Kuno
- Cinematography: Kōichi Kimura
- Edited by: Nobutake Kamiya
- Distributed by: Funny Angel
- Release date: January 27, 1996
- Running time: 88 minutes
- Language: Japanese

Mari's Game (マリーの獲物, Marī no Emono; alternately translated as Mari's Prey) is a 1996 Japanese erotic thriller film directed by Keiichirō Yoshida. The film stars Makiko Kuno.

== Cast ==
- Makiko Kuno
- Takeshi Yamato
- Kenichi Endō
- Ren Osugi
- Teppei Shibuya
- Taisaku Akino
- Hitomi Shiraishi
- Kanpei Hazama
- Kasae Umetsu
- Ryuji Katagiri
- Shohei Hino

== See also ==
- XX: Beautiful Hunter
