= Lady Hunter: Prelude to Murder =

- Directed by: Takashi Miike
- Written by: Shinjirō Ishihama (story); Tatsuo Eguchi (screenplay)
- Produced by: Shochiku Company
- Starring: Yoshie Kashiwabara; Naomi Morinaga
- Cinematography: Shigeru Komatsubara
- Music by: Tomio Terada
- Release date: December 21, 1991
- Running time: 79 minutes
- Country: Japan
- Language: Japanese

Lady Hunter: Prelude To Murder (レディハンター 殺しのプレリュード, Redi Hantā: Koroshi No Pureryūdo) is a 1991 Japanese action film directed by Takashi Miike. It was the first film shot by Takashi Miike, even though it was released after Toppū! Minipato tai - Aikyacchi Jankushon.

== Plot ==
A former soldier working in a daycare center must take a young child, Riki, home with him when his mother does not show up to pick him up at the end of the day. While driving home he escapes a kidnap attempt on the child by a mysterious group of armed men and decides to hide out with his former lover Saeko, a female former soldier with whom he was in love during their time in the service together. The attackers, led by the boy's father the King of Moldova, captured his mother earlier and are now coming for his son. They track the boy to Saeko's home, where Saeko and her former lover must battle to save the child from being abducted by his father. Saeko still has dreams about her time in the service and is willing to use her skills to fight off the attackers and protect the boy.

== Cast ==
- Yoshie Kashiwabara as Saeko
- Naomi Morinaga
- Kōsuke Morita
- Isao Murata

== See also ==
- List of Japanese films of 1991
