= Inday =

Inday may refer to:

- Inday, a U.S. manufacturer of electronics whose owner named the company after his Filipino wife's nickname
- Inday, a Filipino given name
  - Inday Badiday or Lourdes Jimenez Carvajal, (August 6, 1944 – September 26, 2003), a Filipino host and journalist
  - "Inday" Happylou Magtibay (played by Barbie Forteza), a main character in the 2018 GMA Network television series Inday Will Always Love You
  - Sara Duterte (born 1978), a Filipino politician and the 15th vice president of the Philippines commonly known as "Inday Sara"
  - Dionesa Tolentin (born 2000), a Filipino footballer commonly known as "Inday Tolentin"
  - Fasullo/Inday, a character on the GMA Network television series Zaido: Pulis Pangkalawakan
- Inday Ba or N'Deaye Ba, (10 August 1972 – 20 April 2005), a Swedish-Senegalese film, stage, and television actress
- Typhoon Inday, the name of six typhoons in the Northwestern Pacific Ocean
