= Makiko Kuno =

Japanese actress (born 1967)

- Born: February 21, 1967 (age 59); Maebashi, Gunma Prefecture, Japan
- Other names: Shōko Kuno
- Occupation: Actress
- Years active: 1987–present

Makiko Kuno (クノ真季子, Kuno Makiko; born February 21, 1967 in Maebashi, Gunma Prefecture, Japan) is a Japanese actress. Her early stage name was Shōko Kuno (久野翔子, Kuno Shōko); she changed it to Makiko Kuno (久野 真紀子, Kuno Makiko), and switched to writing her surname in katakana in 2005.

Kuno has been active as a model since senior high school, and as an actress made her debut in 1987. In 1986, she participated in the first Pocari Sweat Image Girl Contest, but lost to 17-year-old Chisato Moritaka in the finals. Kuno was the image girl of the JR East kiosks from 1988 to 1994. In 1994, she released a collection of photographs, Mitsu, and appeared nude in an original video, XX: Utsukushiki Karyūdo. In 1998, Kuno played the part of Sunday in the Chunsoft sound novel Machi to a favorable reception. In addition, she qualified as a sommelier in 1998.

== Filmography ==
=== Film ===
- Banana Shoot (1989) as Fuko Hosaka
- Taro! Tokyo makai taisen (1991) as Yasuhara
- The Guard from Underground (1992) as Akiko Narushima
- Fuyu no kappa (1995) as Tamako
- Mari's Prey a.k.a. マリ-の獲物 (1996)
- The Mars Canon (2001) as Kinuko
- World's End Girlfriend Sekai no owari (2005)
- Mushishi (2006) as Maho's mother

=== Television ===
- Ultraman Gaia (1998) as Kyoko Inamori
- Urutora kyû: Dâku fantajî (2004) TV series, a.k.a. Ultra Q: Dark Fantasy

=== Game ===
- Machi (1998)

=== Original video ===
- XX: Beautiful Hunter (1994) as Shion
- Oretachi wa tenshi ja nai (1993) as Eri
- Oretachi wa tenshi ja nai 2 (1993) as Eri
- Sugar: Howling of Angel (1996)
- Inagawa Junji no shinjitsu no horror (2003) a.k.a. J-Horror Anthology: Legends
