= Shigeru Komatsubara =

Japanese cinematographer (born 1949)

Shigeru Komatsubara (小松原茂, Komatsubara Shigeru, born 1949) is a Japanese cinematographer. His work has mostly been in the action genre, but his first feature film was as an assistant on The Pornographers by Shohei Imamura. He worked on early Takashi Miike straight-to-video films such as Lady Hunter and A Human Murder Weapon, and then resumed working with Imamura as chief cinematographer for some of his last films such as Unagi and Dr. Akagi. He also did the cinematography for the 2013 TV series Neko Zamurai starring Kazuki Kitamura.

== Awards ==
He received a Japan Film Technical Award (Nihon Eiga Gijutsushō) from the Motion Picture and Television Engineering Society of Japan for the cinematography for Unagi in 1997, and won the Japan Movie Critics Award for best cinematography in 2008 for Koi suru tomato.

== Filmography ==
Year	Title	Director
1983	The Ballad of Narayama	Shohei Imamura
1991	Toppū! Minipato tai - Aikyacchi Jankushon	Takashi Miike
1991	Lady Hunter: Prelude To Murder	Takashi Miike
1992	A Human Murder Weapon	Takashi Miike
1995	Bad Guy Beach	Shō Aikawa
1996	Zero Woman: Assassin Lovers	Masahide Kuwabara
1997	Unagi	Shohei Imamura
1998	Dr. Akagi	Shohei Imamura
1999	Moonlight Whispers	Akihiko Shiota
2001	Warm Water Under a Red Bridge	Shohei Imamura
2006	13 no Tsuki	Hiroyuki Ikeuchi
2007	Kyonyu wo business ni shita otoko	Takeshi Watanabe
2007	Lemon no Koro	Yuki Iwata
2008	Oka wo koete	Banmei Takahashi
2008	Dōsōkai	Takayuki Takuma
2009	Dōtei Hōrōki	Yûichi Onuma
2013	Aragure	Hajime Gonno
2013	Jinjin	Daiki Yamada
2013	Tobe! Dakota	Seiji Aburatani
