= Kuuma Empire =

Kuuma Empire is a fictional space crime organization in Zaido: Pulis Pangkalawakan and the revival of Fushigi World Fuuma of Uchuu Keiji Shaider.

== History ==
The Kuumas are the descendants of the clan of Fuuma Le-ar. 20 years after their retreat and the death of Le-ar, Ida revived their leader to conquer the universe once again. They follow a strategy in making a planet part of the Kuuma Empire: they kidnap the children of a planet to alert the adults, they then negotiate with the planets leaders. If they surrender, the planet will become a part of the Kuuma empire. If not the planet is destroyed, the planet Earth is the only planet not under control the Kuuma or destroyed. They have the Time Space Warp (Strange Dimension or Shigi Jikyu in original version) a realm with temperatures reaching up to 6000 degrees Celsius. It magnifies the power of their soldiers and monsters. Like the original Fuuma grunts called Miraclers, Kuuma grunts are also spies and have the ability to disguise as humans. Their known dance is the Shigi Shigi and their music is the revival version of Fushigi (sung by Koorogi '73) which can be heard in original series. Their mothership is different from the mothership of Fuuma.

=== Downfall ===
Kuuma Le-ar plans to dominate the entire Planet Earth by resurrecting monsters to destroy there once again. He orders Sigma (Alexis) to seek chaos on Earth, but instead of this, he betrays him. Drigo saves his son Alexis, Alvaro and the Zaido Squad while destroys the machine which controls the Amasonas and later killed by both Ida and Le-ar. Le-ar's monsters, grunts and even his allies are defeated by Zaido Squad, Amasonas, humans and other allies. Le-ar kills Commander Zion before the Kuuma lord faces the three Zaidos. Le-ar, along with Ida, confronts Gallian (Blue), Cervano (Red) and Alexis (Green) in the final Time Space Warp battle. Both Zaido Red and Zaido Green defeat Ida. Zaido Blue beheads Le-ar. Both Ida, who becomes older again, and the beheaded Le-ar are trapped in the Time Space Warp forever and both are died and the entire mothership of Kuuma is exploded. The tomb of the body of Le-ar is now destroyed by the Zaido Squad as an order from Luna. The world is now at peace.

== Members of Kuuma ==
=== Kuuma Le-ar ===
The revival version of Great Emperor Kubilai of the original series. Kuuma Le-ar is the evil leader of the Kuuma Empire bent on annihilating all beings in the galaxy. 20 years later after he was defeated by Shaider, he was revived by Ida by using a blood of Annie to destroy the entire galaxy once again. Le-ar is a giant head with a third eye on his forehead and permanently situated on the center Kuuma Palace wall. He "bears" the Kuuma monsters by spewing out a cocoon from its mouth. He seeks to retrieve his body which was found on Earth before Zaido Squad does. When Ramiro and group of Kuumas found the lost body of Le-ar, the lord of Kuuma merges his lost body into man-size form (unlike the original Kubilai that has large head attached to his small body) so that he would become more powerful than ever. He fuses with Ramiro when he refuses his condition in order to get Debbie back to her father. He resurrects his previous monsters, which the Zaido Squad defeated them, to bring forth the destruction and chaos on Planet Earth. He duels Zaido Blue, Zaido Green and Zaido Red in the final Time Space Warp battle. He is beheaded by Zaido Blue. He and his grandson Ida who becomes old are now trapped inside the Time Space Warp forever and both die. His body is now destroyed to make the Earth peace.

Kuuma Le-ar is voiced by Tirso Cruz III, who also played Ramiro.

=== Ida (II) ===
Ida is the grandson and adviser of Le-ar. He is also the high priest of the Kuuma and is hailed as one of the most beautiful beings in the universe. Like his ancestor Priest Poe (or Babaylan Ida in the Philippine dubbed version), Ida maintains his flawless, androgynous appearance by imbibing a concoction made from the blood of 13 young women. Ida is known for his trademark phrase "Time Space Warp, ngayon din!" (roughly translates to "Strange Dimension, now!"). Ida confronts Zaido Red and Zaido Green in the final Time Space Warp battle. He is defeated by Zaido Green and Zaido Red before they would help Zaido Blue to finish Le-ar. Ida, along with the beheaded Le-ar, is now trapped in the Time Space Warp as he gets older and both die.

Paolo Ballesteros played the role of Ida.

=== Drigo (II) ===
As Le-ar's field commander, Drigo leads the Kuuma in their campaign against Earth. Unlike his predecessor Hessler (Drigo I), he is rather incompetent and is often the subject of derogatory comments. In flashbacks, he revealed that he had a relationship with Sharina, Cervano's real mother but unbeknownst to him and to Commander Zion, it was actually Shanara (Helen) who was impregnated by Drigo when she pretended to be her twin sister to break up with him. Drigo turns out to be father of Alexis (not Cervano) and points out that his son is half-human, half-Kuuma. Drigo saves his son Alexis, Alvaro and Zaido Squad from Ida and Le-Ar's attack, destroys the mainframe to turn the Amasonas back into their lives and battles both of them until he is killed by Ida and Le-Ar in the final battle. Drigo is played by Jay Manalo.

=== Ida Dida ===
Ida Dida is the mini version of Ida who was given birth by Le-ar during Ida's birthday. Even if Ida speaks, she repeats what he says. Her fate is unknown.

Ida Dida is played by a child actress, Nicole Dulalia.

=== Gayke ===
Gayke is a Kuuma grunt who is usually sent by Ida to aid in their missions (as opposed to Fasullo with Drigo). He disguises as a female human being, but retains the mannerisms of a Kuuma soldier. He sometimes accompanies Ida when they go to Earth for a mission. Gayke wanted to keep his "female human" form but he was hesitant because of Ida. Ida agreed to let Gayke keep his girly form so that he can watch over the kids of Tala and help any Kuuma monster in carrying out the mission. This is to point out that all Kuumas are male (except for Ida Dida), and they had to "recruit" female human beings just so they can form a group of Amasonas (so that they get to have real female members). He was among the grunts who were killed in the final battle.

Gayke (Human) is portrayed by Chariz Solomon.

=== Fasullo/Inday ===
Fasullo is a Kuuma intelligence agent sent by Drigo to guard the Zaidos (especially Cervano). He disguises as Inday, an English-speaking maid working for Cervano's Family. When Fasullo first appeared and talked to Drigo, he had a male voice in Spanish-like language. He turns into an ally after he saved Cervano's adoptive family from the grunts' attack, retaining his "Inday" persona and now speaks in Tagalog but in Balagtasan phrase. Before the final battle, Fasullo joins the forces of good, the Zaido and the Galactic Force. Fasullo is the only Kuuma blood who didn't harm the humans (even Cervano and his adoptive family) and befriended them when he disguised as Inday. After the final battle, he retains his "female" persona as Inday and his "Kuuma" status wears off and also he has to leave Cervano's family. Inday lives with love interest Dodong.

Fasullo/Inday is portrayed by Patricia Ismael.

=== Amasonas ===
The Amasonas (literally Amazons) are a revival of the Girl's Army in the original Shaider series. The term was used to describe the Girl's Army in the Philippine dubbed version of Shaider. Unlike the original kunoichi who were unidentified, the new Amasonas are identified by color and are in reality, human beings taken from Planet Earth. All the amasonas have had a bad history with the men in their lives. During that time, the Kuuma Empire was also in dire need of reinforcements, as a lot of Drigo's men were killed in the battle with the three Zaido. Ida took advantage of this point when the girls were filled with hatred, sorrow and confusion, and brought them and other girls who were also troubled in a "seminar" for women called KUMA or KUmakalinga sa mga Magdalenang Api (lit: Those who care for oppressed women). The five were chosen because according to Ida, they had the most hatred inside of them, plus he didn't want the looks of all the other girls. Ida hypnotized and brought the five girls to the Kuuma headquarters where they were turned into Amazonas. The colors of their respective Amasona outfits are the same as the colors of the dress/clothes they were wearing during their transformation. Their powers are using gold magic dust to put victims into sleep. Later, they have remembered their loved ones and their lives and have to betray the Kuuma. However, Ida orders the Kuumas to reprogram the Amasonas to make them stronger than before. Later, they revert into their normal lives and join the forces, the Zaido, against Kuuma.

==== Amasonang Lila ====
Amasonang Lila (Purple Amazon) is the fastest of the Amasonas, her expertise lies on the use of her personal weapon: the kali. Debbie is Ramiro's daughter, and a colleague of Mona's at the newspaper before turning into an Amasona. Debbie has recently discovered that it was her father who ordered the execution of Alvaro, Alexis' older brother. Later, Debbie joins the side of good. After the defeat of Kuuma and death of her father Ramiro (Le-ar), she reunites with her friend Mona. In the end, she meets and falls in love with Alvaro.

LJ Reyes played the role of Amasonang Lila/Debbie.

==== Amasonang Itim ====
Sonia Tamano, or known as Amasonang Itim (Black Amazon), used to be a colleague of Carmela in a security agency. Seeing Gallian save her from a hostage-taker made her readily fall for him. However, after making advances on him, she was rejected by Gallian and was told off by Carmela. Adding the fact that she was cheated upon by her former boyfriend, she was pushed to the brink which made her join KUMA. Now, she is an expert in pistols and fights for the forces of Kuuma. Sonia joins the Zaido against the Kuuma. Sonia, along with Marla and Debbie, saves Rhea and Stacy from Shadow's attack and stops him also. After the final battle, she reunites with Carmela. In the end, Sonia takes care of Mona after her friend Carmela decides to leave with Gallian for good.

Iwa Moto played the role of Amasonang Itim/Sonia Tamano.

==== Amasonang Rosas ====
Amasonang Rosas (Pink Amazon), known as Marla, is a martial arts expert who used to be one of Doctor Eng's boarders. Before she became an Amasona, she was being harassed by her training officer at a fast food chain. When she rejected his advances, she was eliminated from the training and was replaced by another one who is more "qualified" when in reality she just refused to kiss the officer. Of all the Amasonas, she is the strongest. Her weapons are a pair of short, trident-like blades. Marla turns into human again and joins the forces of good. After the final battle, she reunites with Amy. In the end, Marla works with Doctor Eng in his medicine store.

Amasonang Rosas/Marla is portrayed by Melissa Avelino.

==== Amasonang Puti ====
Stacy, known later as Amasonang Puti (White Amazon), was once a scorned girlfriend of Cervano before joining the Amasonas. From her group, she is cursed with a conscience, and must struggle every time if she will do good or evil. Her weapon is a spiked ball attached to a chain which she uses to hit her enemies and/or make them immobilized by bounding them with the chain. Later, Stacy joins her former boyfriend's force, the Zaido. In the end, Stacy and Rhea tell Cervano that they've become close friends.

Amasonang Puti/Stacy is played by Arci Muñoz.

==== Amasonang Kahel ====
Another girlfriend of Cervano scorned, Amasonang Kahel (Orange Amazon), known as Rhea, becomes more aggressive after she becomes part of the Kuuma Empire. With her expertise in guns and her sharp eye for shooting, she will prove to be a formidable enemy. Rhea would become an ally to Zaido Squad before the final battle. She shoots Siba-tiba while saving Amy. In the end, Stacy and Rhea tell Cervano that they've become close friends.

Vaness del Moral played the role of Amasonang Kahel/Rhea.

=== Kuuma Monsters ===
==== Nigi-nigi ====
Nigi-nigi is the first monster deployed by Kuuma. It can destroy enemies using laser beams from its eyes. It vaguely resembles the Predator from the film series, albeit this creature had a cluster of tentacles as hands. Eliminated by Zaido Blue in a Time Space Warp Battle. Nigi-nigi was resurrected by Le-ar but later killed again by Zaido Blue in the final battle.

- Counterpart(s) from the original: Bari-bari

==== Bawaw-aw ====
Bawaw-aw is the second monster created by Kuuma. The monster's name is the Filipino onomatopoeia of a dog's bark. Can itself disguise as a Pomeranian named "Mighty" which can bite victims so they get infected with rabies and turn into animals. Wiped out by Zaido Red in a Time Space Warp battle. Bawaw-aw was revived by Le-ar but was terminated by Zaido Blue in the final battle. Bawaw-aw is also named as "Bawaw".

- Counterpart(s) from the original: Peto-peto, Mero-mero

==== Tinik-ik ====
Tinik-ik is the third monster deployed by Kuuma. The monster shaped like a Venus fly trap. Named after the Tagalog term for thorns, tinik. It can devour living things (even humans) to grow bigger and stronger and has a sweet scent so that the victims may attract and worship it. If this monster grows stronger, it turns the victims (including Amy) into plants. Dr. Eng named the plant as "Mimosa Negra" because of the dark color it has. When Tinik-ik is in its true form, it is somewhat resembled The Undead Joker of Masked Rider Blade. Destroyed by Zaido Green in a Time Space Warp battle. Tinik-ik was revived by Le-ar but later killed again by Zaido Green in the final battle.

- Counterpart(s) from the original: Giru-giru, Tsuta-Tsuta

==== Siba-tiba ====
Siba-tiba is the fourth monster created by Kuuma. The huge, orange-skinned monster that his weapons are giant knife and giant fork which can turn any victims into food and also has the power to use odorous gas to put the victims into sleep. Named after the Tagalog terms for glutton, Siba, and for fat, tiba, which is also meaning of taba. He can disguise as a human like the other Kuumas and he is named as "Tabatino". He's also responsible for making and selling crispy chips to make the children (as victims) enlarge their stomach and excess the same gas. There is another mini version of Siba-Tiba. Zaido Green slayed Siba-tiba by using Avilo Robot in Time Space Warp battle and its mini version is also slain by Zaido Kids. Siba-tiba was revived by Le-ar to seek chaos once again but shot and killed by Rhea (Amasonang Kahel) while she saved Amy in the final battle.

Tabatino (Siba-tiba in human) is played by Ryan Yllana.

- Counterpart(s) from the original: Goku-goku

==== Bola-boba ====
Bola-boba is the fifth monster created by Kuuma. This monster that his body is composed of other types of sports balls and other sports equipment and his head is a trophy. Named after Tagalog words for ball, bola, and for dumb, boba. He disguises as a coach named "Vola". The mini version of Bola-boba disguises as a human (Buboy) also and uses a mini ball as a spell to make the children playful endlessly. Bola-boba kidnaps the Starlight varsity players and turn them into Kuuma grunts so that he can make the losing athletes and audiences (as victims) into trophies by using a ball. The mini version of Bola-boba was defeated by Zaido Kids and the spell was removed. Killed by Zaido Blue in Time Space Warp battle. However, Bola-boba, along the monsters, are revived to destroy the world again. Bola-boba was revived by Le-ar to destroy humans once again but killed by Zaido Green in the final battle.

Coach Vola (Bola-boba in human) is played by Alex Crisano and Buboy (mini Bola-boba) is also played by Mura.

- Counterpart(s) from the original: Koto-koto

==== Pasko-paksiw ====
Pasko-paksiw is the sixth monster deployed by Kuuma. This green-skinned monster (vaguely resembles The Grinch) who dresses up as Santa Claus and the mini version dresses up also as an elf. Pasko-paksiw gives the children a Christmas sock and a pendant (as traps), which when the children sleep, the mysterious power of a pendant flows out, gets the children and put them inside the sock to turn them into Christmas balls. Despite this, these balls can break easily to free the children. Terminated by Zaido Red in Time Space Warp battle. Pasko-paksiw has not revived by Le-ar. Therefore, Shadow, who is also known as Toby and an enemy to Zaido Squad, is Pasko-paksiw's replacement.

- Counterpart(s) from the original: Sata-sata

==== Giga-wiga ====
Giga-wiga, the seventh monster, is half-monster, half-machine deployed by Kuuma that his body armor is composed of game controller buttons and two monitors with two orbs on his shoulders and his head is topped with a monitor screen also. It has metal sharp claws as a weapon. Disguising as "Giggle", he hacks the virus into the computers (even video game gadgets) and making them into his video game so that he may use his powers to trap the players or clients (as victims) inside the video game and any victim (challenger) will challenge Giga-wiga. He creates the miniature version of his image to fight the Zaido Kids and later defeated by them. Zaido Blue dispatches Giga-wiga by using Avilo Robot in Time Space Warp battle. Giga-wiga was revived by Le-ar, however he was killed by Zaido Blue in the final battle.

Gio Alvarez played the role of Giggle (Giga-wiga in human).

- Counterpart(s) from the original: Robo-robo, Kon-kon, Movie-movie

==== Roko-loko ====
Roko-loko, eighth monster, is a skull-faced monster who wields his electronic guitar as his weapon to hypnotize audience (victims) so that they would praise the Kuuma. He accompanies with Kuumas to disguise as humans including Roko-loko himself (Rock) to form his rock band. His hypnotic musical powers can be vulnerable by reversing this music in which Ulla did to the Zaido Kids who were hypnotized by Roko-loko. He was killed by Zaido Blue in Time Space Warp battle and the miniature form was also dispatched by Zaido Kids. This is considered as the last monster deployed by Kuuma and defeated by Zaido. Revived by Le-ar but later killed by Zaido Red in the final battle.

- Counterpart(s) from the original: Tam-tam

=== Shigeki ===
Shigeki is a descendant of ancient Samurai warriors and he tries to defeat the Zaido. His armor is invincible and the Zaido Kids cannot easily defeat him but until he is defeated by Zaido Blue, Zaido Red and Amy despite his strong attacks and fades away into nothingness. Shigeki is not a member of Kuuma Empire.

Shigeki is played by Japanese actor Tai Tomoyuki.

=== Other members ===
==== Armida (impostor) ====
The real Armida used to be mother of Gallian and the queen of Nalax who died during the Kuuma-supported coup by Izcaruz. The Kuuma made the clone of her image (same as Arianna/Carmela) so that they would infiltrate the Galactic Force and kill Gallian. Unknown to Gallian, she and "Arianna" wanted him to believe them and they want to put Commander Zion and Carmela (the real Arianna) in "execution". Zion and Gallian finds out that Armida is an impostor which was made by Kuuma. Killed by Amy so that she would activate Zaido badge to make Gallian, Alexis, and Cervano transform.

Pinky Amador played Armida (real and impostor).

==== Arianna (impostor) ====
The clone of Arianna (Carmela) which was made by Kuuma. She attempts to kill Gallian but later was killed by him.

Arianna impostor was played by Diana Zubiri, who also played Carmela (real Arianna).

==== Sigma ====
Known as Alexis Lorenzo (Zaido Green). He joined the forces of evil after his biological father, Drigo saved him from Gallian's attack. Le-ar made him a disciple of Kuuma and named him Sigma. Like his father, he commanded the revived monsters to bring forth the chaos on Earth. Despite this, he didn't kill his mother and he's also a descendant of Shaider. Armed with a blade which is somewhat similar to Zaido Blade. He and his brother Alvaro witness the death of their mother Helen (Shanara) who was killed by Le-ar. His "Sigma" alias breaks off and later returns as Zaido Green in which he forgives Gallian and Cervano for his wrong things.

Sigma is played by Marky Cielo, who is also behind of Zaido Green/Alexis. Thus, his character, Alexis, made himself an anti-hero.

==== Gamma ====
Known as Alvaro Lorenzo. When Kuumas retrieved his dead body, Ida revived him by putting a water of Herabim which can revive any living things. He sent to Earth to invade as Gamma. His mission is to kill Zaido Blue (Gallian) and Zaido Red (Cervano) but failed. He targeted Zaido Green but knew that he's Alexis. He convinced him to join the Kuuma forces. Armed with gamma ray laser gun. He and his brother Alexis witness the death of their mother Helen who was killed by Le-ar. Alvaro becomes an ally to Zaido Squad in the final battle and his alter-ego wears off.

Gamma/Alvaro Lorenzo is portrayed by Raymart Santiago.

==== Shadow ====
Known as Toby Mendoza who used to be Cervano's friend and styled himself as "Zaido Gold". He convinced Cervano to join the Zaido but declined. He became Shadow, Zaido-like enemy. He was defeated by Zaido Squad. After his defeat and disappearance, he was revived by Le-ar to seek revenge once again. However, he was defeated by Amasonas in the final battle.

Shadow/Toby Mendoza is played by Gian Carlos.

== Time Space Warp ==
The Time Space Warp is an alternate universe with various traps and other dimensions. Some of the traps used in this realm are designed to match the monster's theme. Also seen are grunts and minions that assist the monster against each Zaido. The temperature in this dimension reaches about 6,000 degrees Celsius. The primary purpose of this dimension is to enhance Kuuma monster's powers and abilities for about 4 times, giving it the upper hand against each Zaido. When Kuuma Le-Ar calls for the Time Space Warp, Ida will summon it to draw the beast inside, thereby luring each Zaido to follow it into Fuuma territory. A constant threat each Zaido faces while inside this dimension is a Kuuma gunship; for this reason, he calls on Avilo, using either its giant blaster or robot form to destroy the gunship.

Despite an upgrade in its fighting strength, a Kuuma monster can still be destroyed by each Zaido while inside the Time Space Warp. This, in turn, will dissolve the warp until the next time it is summoned again. Ida's phrase in Tagalog is "Time Space Warp, ngayon din!" (Strange Dimension, Now!)

== See also ==
- Zaido: Pulis Pangkalawakan
