= We're No Angels (1993 film) =

1993 Japanese comedy film

- Directed by: Takashi Miike
- Written by: Jōji Abe (story); Itō Yasutaka (screenplay)
- Based on: 俺達は天使じゃない by Jōji Abe
- Produced by: Fujio Matsushima
- Cinematography: Yasuhiko Mitsui
- Music by: Tomio Terada
- Release date: October 29, 1993
- Running time: 77 minutes
- Country: Japan
- Language: Japanese

We're No Angels (俺達は天使じゃない, Oretachi wa tenshi ja nai) is a 1993 Japanese action comedy film directed by Takashi Miike based on the novel of the same name by Jōji Abe.

== Plot ==
Joe Nakajima is released from Fuchū Prison. The first person he encounters is his fellow former yakuza Kenta, who was released six months earlier and has undergone sex reassignment surgery to become a woman in order to start a new life at the suggestion of Chu, a man who runs the Angel Delivery service as a legitimate employment opportunity for former yakuza with the aid of funding from Mr. Abe, a former yakuza who is now a successful author. Joe falls for Eri Ishikawa, the landlady in whose home the business is located, causing Kenta to become jealous.

Eiji Yasuda, the boss of Yasuda Finance who was one of Joe's fellow inmates, catches his wife having sex with his underling Tsuyoshi. Tsuyoshi is unwilling to cut off his pinky finger, so Yasuda offers to take the deed to his home as collateral for a restitution payment of 30 million yen. Tsuyoshi visits his sister Eri and steals the deed to her home, and thereby to Angel Delivery as well, to give to his boss.

The Love Cult Church priest tells Yasuda to gather more money from the cult members. Yasuda calls Eri and tells her that she must pay at least the interest on a loan for which her home has been put up as collateral. She tells her employees that she must close the business because she owes money to Yasuda Finance, so Joe visits Yasuda. Yasuda says that he is charging 10 million yen per month in interest and that Joe can take over the debt if he wants, but that he will have to offer worthwhile collateral. Yasuda's underlings beat Kenta severely when she refuses to have sex with one of them. This gives Eri an idea, so she offers herself to Yasuda in exchange for absolving the debt. After they have sex, Yasuda refuses to absolve the debt. When Jo comforts Eri as she walks back home, Kenta watches with jealousy and tears off her wish bracelet. She is then approached by a member of the Love Cult Church.

Joe borrows money and obtains two grenades from Mr. Abe. Joe and Chu go to Yasuda Finance, where Joe beats up the yakuza working there and gives Yasuda 40 million yen for the deed to Eri's home. After Joe gets the deed, Chu chews up the lending agreement and Joe takes back the money now that there is no lending agreement. More yakuza enter and try to take the money, but Joe pulls the pin on a grenade to force everyone to let him walk away. The Love Cult Church priest cuts off Yasuda's pinky finger and gives the finger as well as control of Yasuda Finance Yasuda's underling whom Kenta refused sex.

When Kenta fails to show up for work, the members of Angel Delivery share that they all lent money to her before she disappeared. Eri says that Kenta has been visiting the Love Cult Church and that Chu went to investigate. Kenta gives all her money to the church, then sees the church leaders giving the money to the man whom she refused sex. Chu explains to Joe and Eri that Yasuda takes the church donations because a religious organization is exempt from scrutiny by the government, then Yasuda Finance gives loans to the churchgoers, thereby keeping all of the money in a loop. Chu sneaks into the church and cracks their safe, discovering their funds and financial records. He overhears Kenta being attacked and tries to save her, but becomes trapped. Eri begs to talk to the priest, but when she is refused entry, Joe forces his way in and beats up the yakuza. They find the priest, who removes his costume to reveal his extensive yakuza tattoos. Joe defeats him and saves Chu and Kenta.

== Cast ==
- Rikiya Yasuoka as Jo Nakajima
- Junji Inagawa as Chu
- Makiko Kuno as Eri Ishikawa
- Love as Kenta
- Jōji Abe as Jōji Abe
- Saki Kurihara as one of the leaders of the Love Cult Church
- Kenji Shiiya
- Ren Osugi as Love Cult Church priest (Ueno, a yakuza kingpin)

== Sequel ==
The film was followed by the sequel We're No Angels 2, which was released on home video on December 24, 1993.

== Production and release ==
The transgender character Kenta was played by transgender actress Love.

We're No Angels was released on VHS on October 29, 1993. It was released on DVD together with its sequel on February 24, 2012.

== Reception ==
Reviewer Panos Kotzathanasis of Asian Movie Pulse wrote, "The combination of action, comedy, and sensualism works quite well for the film, since Miike manages to present them all adequately, in a fashion that results in a faulty, but also quite entertaining effort. The unfulfilled love triangle between Jo, Eri and Kenta functions as the base of the narrative, with most occurrences taking place due to the particular dynamics, which are the main source of both comedy and the few moments of drama. [...] Technically, there is not much to comment on, with Fujio Matushima's cinematography being basic, in essence just accompanying the episodic nature of the narrative. Probably the best aspect of the production is the set design, an element that finds its apogee on the cult part." The review concludes that the film "is not among Miike's best works, and the story is hyperbolic. However, it is quite entertaining, and in terms of production, relatively accomplished, with the combination resulting in one of the most watchable early efforts of the prolific Japanese director."

In his book Agitator: The Cinema of Takashi Miike, author Tom Mes writes that "it's quite remarkable how similar the premise [...] is to Bodyguard Kiba: a former yakuza, just released from prison and trying to adjust to a normal life, finds himself in trouble with a group of gangsters. However, the execution couldn't be more different, since Oretachi Wa Tensbi Ja Nai is first and foremost a comedy." Discussing the characters, Tom Mes writes, "This quartet of former criminals trying to adjust to life as law-abiding citizens is another early version of the typical Miike group of outcasts." Mes concludes, "Where the film works best is in the dynamics between the four main characters, although the character of Chu remains rather ill defined. Much of the humour in Oretachi Wa Tenshi Ja Nai is sexual, usually involving the size of Jo's member, Jo and Chu's curiosity about Kenta's body, or the triangle of unanswered love between Kenta, Jo and Eri. Though rather juvenile, the humour is on the whole fairly inoffensive, which mixes well with the likeable performances from the main cast, but less so with several dramatic scenes in the aftermath of Eri's sexual encounter with Yasuda."

Asian Movie Enthusiast stated that the film and its sequel "have simplistic, low-brow humor". Criticizing the tonal shifts, he stated, "Similar to Eyecatch Junction, the shifts in tone really screw this film up."

Reviewer Eigasuke wrote, "It's a cheap V-cinema based on a novel by Joji Abe and starring Rikiya Yasuoka, but... the bizarre performance by Ren Osugi as the cult leader, which I'd heard rumors about, is a real treat!" The reviewer also noted, "I never got bored of the vulgar jokes."

CinemaTerror stated, "This is for Miike completists only."

In a combined review of both films, 16oz Cinema called We're No Angels Miike's "most slapsticky film probably and one of his most underrated".
