= Eyecatch Junction =

- Toppū! Minipato tai – Aikyacchi Jankushon
- Directed by: Takashi Miike
- Written by: Akio Takemoto; Hiro Masaki
- Story by: Akio Takemoto
- Produced by: Japan Home Video (JHV)
- Starring: Aiko Asano; Daisuke Nagakura
- Cinematography: Shigeru Komatsubara
- Release date: October 25, 1991
- Running time: 92 minutes
- Country: Japan
- Language: Japanese

Eyecatch Junction (Japanese: 突風!ミニパト隊/アイキャッチジャンクション, Hepburn: Toppū! Minipato tai - Aikyacchi Jankushon; lit. Sudden Gust! Mini-Patrol Corps / Eyecatch Junction) is a 1991 Japanese action comedy film directed by Takashi Miike. This was the second film directed by Takashi Miike, though it was released prior to Lady Hunter: Prelude to Murder, the first film he directed.

== Plot ==
The Shintai Sobu fitness club is formed by the chief of police to maintain high public opinion of the police force and its first recruit is the ambitious traffic cop Makoto. She enters into a martial arts competition with athletic weightlifter Atsuko, who agrees to join if she loses while Makoto agrees to shave her head if she loses. Makoto almost loses but discovers that Atsuko is ticklish and defeats her by exploiting this weakness. Together with their fitness instructor Miyuki, these daring policewomen form the secret Eyecatch Junction team to defeat criminals using athletics and gymnastics. Megumi Okada, contractor for the Central Station's Crime Lab and the mayor's daughter, eavesdrops on their conversations using her technology and secretly sends them information she collects under the code name Secret Eyecatch. While investigating the murder of college student Kyoko Iida, they uncover the details of an escort ring called the System Club and take down the yakuza running it.

== Cast ==
- Daisuke Nagakura as Detective Kawamura
- Aiko Asano
- Minako Fujimoto
- Hiroko Nakajima
- Risa Tachibana
- Bū Takagi

== See also ==
- List of Japanese films of 1991
