= We're No Angels 2 =

1993 Japanese action comedy film

- Directed by: Takashi Miike
- Written by: Jōji Abe (story); Itō Yasutaka (screenplay)
- Based on: 俺達は天使じゃない by Jōji Abe
- Produced by: Fujio Matsushima
- Cinematography: Yasuhiko Mitsui
- Music by: Tomio Terada
- Release date: December 24, 1993
- Running time: 70 minutes
- Country: Japan
- Language: Japanese

We're No Angels 2 (俺達は天使じゃない2, Oretachi wa tenshi ja nai 2) is a 1993 Japanese action comedy film directed by Takashi Miike. It is the sequel to We're No Angels, which was released earlier in 1993. Both films are based on the novel by Jōji Abe.

== Plot ==
A recap of the previous film explains that Jo, Chu, Eri, and Kenta defeated Yasuda and then defeated Ueno, a yakuza kingpin posing as the priest of the Love Cult Church.

On a refrigerator delivery, Kenta mentions not enjoying delivering things to city hall. Jo thinks that she is still thinking like a yakuza, but it turns out that she is avoiding a boyfriend who works in city hall. The police receive a letter from Katsumasu Kawahara, First Secretary to Yasuo Nakata, Vice President of the Liberal Democratic Party, detailing Nakata's crimes. Detective Mizuta wants to investigate, but the police chief, using the codename "Yaraposki", calls Nakata to warn him about the person seeking to expose him. Kawahara is garroted by a bearded man with a tracheal tube on his way to meet with Mizuta.

Chu uses his lockpicking skills to help Kawahara's daughter Mio, who has locked her keys in her car. Mio later calls Angel Delivery to help her move and gives Chu a pair of her father's shoes as a gift. Chu discovers a strip of negative film in one of the shoes showing donations of millions of yen to various retirement homes, but when Jo and Eri visit the Sunflower Home, they find the residents wearing cheap clothing such as straw sandals. Kenta suggests that the money is being funneled elsewhere.

Nakata's boss tells him to get the film negative back in two days. At the Angel Delivery office, the bearded man knocks out Eri and fights with Chu, but Kenta's return causes the man to flee. Mizuta shows Mio her father's letter and she agrees to get the film negative and give it to him the next day. The bearded man sneaks into Mio's home and kidnaps her, then makes her call Chu and ask him to come alone with the film negative. Chu goes alone and is caught by the bearded man, who takes the film negative, but Jo follows him and saves him and Mio.

Eri begins working at the Sunflower Home retirement home and snoops around the administrative offices. She does not find any financial records, but there is a large safe in one of the offices that is suspicious. Kenta mentions that her boyfriend in city hall told her that the director of the retirement home is the brother-in-law of an influential politician named Nakata. Chu reveals that he made a copy of the film negative. The police chief discovers some discrepancies in the film negative that he was given by the bearded man.

The police stop Jo, Chu, and Kenta in their delivery truck and pretend that they have found drugs inside. Angered by the frameup, Jo fights off the police and escapes while Chu and Kenta are arrested. Mio calls Mizuta for help, while Jo gets money from Mr. Abe. The police chief gives the film negative to Nakata, who gets back in his limo to leave, but Jo is inside and drives him to the Sunflower Home retirement home. Jo obtains the combination to the safe from Nakata's brother-in-law Koto, then lights dynamite to force Nakata to confess to causing Kawahara's murder, ordering the retirement home to funnel money for him, and hiring a hitman to kill the members of Angel Delivery. Eri uses a camcorder to record Nakata's confession. Nakata says that he will claim he was coerced to say those things, so Jo brings in a tattoo artist who tattoos the words "dirty politician" to Nakata's forehead.

As the police chief leaves his office, Mizuta appears with two other policemen holding a warrant to arrest the police chief for embezzlement and information trafficking. Nakata flees the country. The bearded man walks away freely. As the credits are rolling, Chu cries out "Hey wait!" The credits rewind, and Chu is shown distressed in prison. He screams, "Stop right there! Why did this happen to me? Why?! Let me out!" The screen fades to black, and the credits begin rolling again from the start.

== Cast ==
- Rikiya Yasuoka as Jo Nakajima
- Junji Inagawa as Chu
- Makiko Kuno as Eri Ishikawa
- Love as Kenta
- Mickey Curtis as assassin (bearded man with tracheal tube)
- Jōji Abe as Jōji Abe
- Chiyako Mari as Mio
- Kazuya Nakayama as Mizuta

== Production and release ==
The transgender character Kenta was played by transgender actress Love.

We're No Angels 2 was released on VHS on December 24, 1993. It was released together with We're No Angels on DVD on February 24, 2012.

== Reception ==
Reviewer Panos Kotzathanasis of Asian Movie Pulse wrote, "The combination of nudity, action and comedy is still here, but is not implemented in the same entertaining fashion as in the first part, with the sequel's only really interesting aspect being the presence of the noir-style killer, played with gusto by Mickey Curtis and depicted quite fittingly by DP Yasuhiko Mitsui. The fact that Kenta and Jo are somewhat pushed to the background in favor of Chu faults the overall narrative, since the particular character lacks the level of appeal the two other have, with he same applying to Junji Inagawa's charisma in comparison with Love and Rikiya Yasuoka. Add to that the lack of a secondary concept like the cult of the previous episode and you have the reasons why the sequel is definitely on a lower level than the first one. A couple of slapstick and crude jokes, like the one with the elderly man urinating on Jo, the unfolding of a rather wide roll of paper, and the whole appearance of the Angels with the ridiculous hats, may bring a bit of grinning on the viewer, but that's about it, even regarding the humor in the movie." The review concludes that the film "is one of the most forgettable entries in Miike's vast filmography and an effort only addressed to hard-core fans."

In his book Agitator: The Cinema of Takashi Miike, author Tom Mes writes that "The problems that plague the film are even more apparent in the sequel, which Miike shot back-to-back with the first film. Oretachi Wa Tenshi Ja Nai 2 possibly suffers even more from a convoluted plot hinging on far too many coincidences. [...] The plot of Oretachi Wa Tenshi Ja Nai 2 is surprising only in its ability to rely on coincidence to advance the story. Like A Human Murder Weapon, the story is so underdeveloped that the film is only 70 minutes long. The four main characters have become thoroughly flat, all-purpose crimefighters. Like the characters in a formulaic TV series, they are suitable for use in any intrigue that offers enough opportunity for a few gags and some punchups. The contrast between the dramatic moments and the comedy is even more apparent here than in the first episode, particularly in the scenes of the kidnapping and torture of Mio. Scenes like these sit rather uncomfortably with running gags like Jo repeatedly building and then crushing a model airplane." The review concludes, "This mishmash of comedy, action, violence and nudity is emblematic of the approach of many V-cinema productions. In advertising, trailers or video box art such aspects certainly help draw in the punters, but in the end little attempt is made to tie them up into a proper storyline. So even though the film should theoretically contain enough elements to entertain indiscriminate viewers, the lack of structure more often than not makes the end result rather a bore. Even at a mere 70 minutes."

Asian Movie Enthusiast stated that, in comparison to We're No Angels, We're No Angels 2 "seems to toss in some other plot lines and conflicts in rather messy ways. It starts off with that premise and then it, you know, flows into some other stuff." On the positive side, he stated that the sequel is "a bit more serious and does a better job of avoiding some of those low-grade jokes, but it still suffers from many of the same non-comedic flaws."

Reviewer Eigasuke wrote, "The story is rough and full of retorts, but... thanks to the dynamic acting of Rikiya Yasuoka, it relentlessly runs through to the ending." Discussing the cast, the reviewer wrote, "The assassin Mickey Curtis was a bizarre performance comparable to Ren Osugi's role as the head of a religious corporation in the first film, but Kazuya Nakayama, who has been quite wild in Miike's recent works, was just a quiet, good guy, which was disappointing."

CinemaTerror stated, "It's for the hardcore Miike completists only."

In a combined review of both films, 16oz Cinema called We're No Angels 2 "a complete shit movie, like, that doesn't make any sense" and said that "There's really not too much to this film".
