= Space Sheriff Shaider =

- Genre: Tokusatsu; Superhero fiction; Space western
- Created by: Saburō Yatsude
- Developed by: Shozo Uehara
- Directed by: Shinichiro Sawai
- Starring: Hiroshi Tsuburaya; Naomi Morinaga
- Narrated by: Tōru Ōhira
- Opening theme: Title song by Akira Kushida
- Ending theme: "Hello! Shaider" by Akira Kushida
- Composer: Michiaki Watanabe
- Country of origin: Japan
- No. of episodes: 49

Production
- Running time: 25 minutes
- Production companies: Toei Company; Asatsu-DK

Original release
- Network: TV Asahi
- Release: March 2, 1984 – March 8, 1985

Related
- Space Sheriff Sharivan; MegaBeast Investigator Juspion

Space Sheriff Shaider (宇宙刑事シャイダー, Uchū Keiji Shaidā) is a Japanese tokusatsu television show that aired from March 2, 1984, to March 8, 1985. It is the last of the "Space Sheriff Series" of the broader Metal Hero Series franchise, it is a sequel the previous two being Space Sheriff Gavan and Space Sheriff Sharivan.

Action footage from Shaider was used for Season 2 of VR Troopers. For distribution purposes, Toei refers to this television series as Space Captain Sheider.

== Plot ==
In college studying archaeology, Dai Sawamura deciphers the symbols of the Nazca Lines in Peru. Impressed by this feat, the Galaxy Federal Police (銀河連邦警察, Ginga Renpō Keisatsu) recruit and train him to be Earth's third Space Sheriff. He's given the code name Shaider in memory of an ancient warrior who defeated Emperor Kubilai and brought down his Fuuma Empire 12,000 years ago. When Fuuma returns, Dai is deputized as he returns to Earth to battle Fuuma.

== Characters ==
=== Vavilos ===
Vavilos (バビロス, Babirosu) serves as the headquarters of Shaider and Annie as it circles around the Earth. In combat, Vavilos can fire the Vavilos Beam (バビロス ビーム, Babirosu Bīmu) from its wings. Whenever Shaider enters the Fushigi Dimension (known as "Time Space Warp" in the Philippines) and encounters a giant Fuuma gunship, he summons Vavilos, commanding it to transform either into a giant gun called the Big Magnum or a giant robot called the Vavilos Robot, whose chest emits a giant laser beam called Vavilos Fire, fires Vavilos Lasers from its hands, can catch the Fuuma Gunship's missiles and throw it back towards the Gunship and can shoot Vavilos Missiles.

- Dai Sawamura (沢村 大, Sawamura Dai)
  (Alexis del Mundo in Philippine dub) A former archaeologist, he continued his astronomer father's research into studying the Nazca images and manages to track the meaning behind it from Peru to Easter Island. There, Dai uncovers an altar that knocks him unconscious. Finding himself on Planet Bird, Dai becomes Shaider (シャイダー, Shaidā) for managing to solve the missing item. Eventually learning of the warrior Shaider and his presumed relation, Dai realizes his fate is to finish his ancestor's duty by putting an end to Fuuma. When Fuuma managed to take over most of the Universe, Dai learns the altar is actually an entrance to where the headless body of Kubilai was sealed along with Kubilai's weak point. Though sealed in by Poe with a limited amount of oxygen, Shaider manages to escape and fight his way through the Fushigi Castle to save Annie before fighting Kubilai and won against the fiend. With his mission on Earth over, Dai decides to take Annie around the world. When he transforms with the command "Shouketsu" (焼結, Shōketsu; "Sinter" or “Plasma Spark”), He is bathed with Plasma Blue Energy emitted from Vavilos to form his blue-colored Combat Suit (コンバットスーツ, Konbatto Sūtsu) armor within milliseconds. As Shaider, he wields the Laser Blade (レーザーブレード, Rēzā Burēdo) sword, which he uses in his signature move the Shaider Blue Flash, and the Video Beam Gun (ビデオビームガン, Bideo Bīmu Gan) that he can use in conjunction with the Shaider Scope scanner to track down invisible foes. His own moves include the Shaider Punch, the Shaider Kick, and the Blue Flash Spark.
- Annie (アニー, Anī)
  Dai's girlfriend, whose homeworld of Mount was annihilated by Fuuma. She requested to be assigned to Earth with Dai, with intentions of vengeance. She usually drives a yellow Mazda RX-7 FB to patrol the streets or arrive at the scene of a battle, using a Laser Shot sidearm in battle. In the crossover special, Dai Reveals to Retsu and Den that she is In Egypt studying archaeology. During the events of Shaider: Next Generation, she is the doctor in a clinic who assisted Shu Karasuma (the new Shaider) by removing the marvel beast Pitapita's unbreakable marvel gel that bound him to its hostage.

==== Arsenal ====
- Shaian (シャイアン, Shaian)
  A multi-part tank that splits into the Sky Shaian (スカイ シャイアン, Sukaishaian), a fighter jet that fires Shaian Beam (シャイアン ビーム, Shaian Bīmu) and the Battle Shaian (バトル シャイアン, Batorushaian), a drill tank that contains Shaian Rockets (シャイアン ロケッツ, Shaian Rokettsu) to attack enemy arsenals on the ground, or underground, rescuing people enslaved by Fuuma in the process. It is also equipped with a Shaian Searcher (シャイアン サーチャー, Shaian Sāchā).
- Blue Hawk (ブルホーク, Buruhōku)
  A Suzuki motorcycle that serves as Shaider's vehicle to enter the "Strange Realm" in order to chase Fuuma's Strange Beasts. Capable of shooting Hawk Lasers (ホークレーザー, Hōkurēzā) and Hawk Missiles (ホークミサイル, Hōkumisairu). On VR Troopers, the Blue Hawk is the name of the jet-fighter used by Ryan Steele, while the motorcycle he uses is called the Nitro Cycle.
- Suzuki SJ
  A stock Suzuki mini-SUV with Jimny livery and spare tire cover design, which Dai uses to patrol in plain clothes. Essentially the same vehicle used in Space Sheriff Gavan, only in blue instead of red.
- Mazda RX-7 Savanna FB
  A yellow sports car which Annie uses to patrol in plain clothes.

=== Earth ===
- Kojiro Oyama (大山 小次郎, Ōyama Kojirō)
  Carrying over from Sharivan and Gavan, Kojiro now runs a pet shop where he owns a pig named Tonko. He doubles as a teacher, giving Dai a place to stay after learning of his past and (once again) unaware of his dual identity. He has feelings for Annie.
- Yoko Komura (小村陽子, Komura Yōko)
  Kojiro's teenage assistant, living with her father Ryusuke Komura (小村良介, Komura Ryōsuke) and younger brother Ryochi Komura (小村良一, Komura Ryōichi).
- Wataru Morishita (森下ワタル, Morishita Wataru)
  A student under Oyama.
- Shin Matsukawa (松川信, Matsukawa Shin)
  A student under Oyama.
- Rumi Akimoto (秋本ルミ, Akimoto Rumi)
  A student under Oyama.
- Keiko Akimoto (秋本恵子, Akimoto Keiko)
  A student under Oyama who is Rumi's sister.
- Warrior Shaider (戦士シャイダー, Senshi Shaidā)
  An ancient warrior from the stars who drove Kubilai from Earth and demolished the Mu Empire (ムー帝国, Mū Teikoku), remaining on Earth for the rest of his days and fathering a line that presumably leads to Dai, the current Shaider. Warrior Shaider's ideals were also the foundation of the Galactic Union Patrol.

=== Galactic Union Police ===
- Commander Qom (コム長官, Komu Chōkan)
  He is the commander of Galactic Union Patrol and the father of Mimi.
- Marin (マリーン, Marīn)
  She is Commander Qom's assistant.
- Mimi (ミミー, Mimī)
  She is the daughter of Commander Com, formerly Gavan's assistant and now his fiancée. She is a teacher at the Space Sheriff School. She asks Shaider to take Annie with him to Earth. After the final battle against Fuuma, she marries Gavan.
- Retsu Ichijouji/Space Sheriff Gavan (一条寺 烈/宇宙刑事ギャバン, Ichijōji Retsu/Uchū Keiji Gyaban)
  The captain of Galactic Union Patrol. He battles Fuuma to defend the Bird Planet. After the battle against Fuuma, he announces his marriage to Mimi.
- Den Iga/Space Sheriff Sharivan (伊賀電/宇宙刑事シャリバン, Iga Den/Uchū Keiji Shariban)
  He is a Space Sheriff from Iga Planet and helps defend that planet from Fuuma attack.
- Ullu
  He has a face like a squirrel, Dai's classmate and friend who was deputized in response to Fuuma's war declaration. He was killed when Fuuma attacks his home planet during the Great Invasion.
- Kitz
  He has a face like a bird, Dai's classmate and friend who was deputized in response to Fuuma's war declaration. He was killed when Fuuma attacks his home planet during the Great Invasion.
- Andro
  Dai's classmate and friend who was deputized in response to Fuuma's war declaration. He is killed when Fuuma attacks his home planet during the Great Invasion.
- Vivian (ビビアン, Bibian)
  A cheery journalist from Planet Bird who, against the wishes of her father, the president, heads to Earth to write about the Space Sheriffs and Fuuma. However, crashing into the Fuuma fortress by mistake, Vivian is used in the villains' plan to destroy Vavilos. In the process, due to Pairpair, Vivian falls in love with Shaider to Annie's dismay.

=== Fushigi World Fuuma ===
Fushigi World Fuuma (不思議界フーマ, Fushigikai Fūma) is a religion from the Mayan Pyramid-like Fushigi Palace in the Fushigi Dimension, a subspace made of atomic particles that reaches temperatures around 6,000 degrees Celsius. The residents of this realm revere Kubilai as a god while carrying out his intent of conquering the universe through psychological attacks on many planets, destroying worlds like Gao, Omega, Mind, Gor, Marine, and Mount before targeting Earth to establish the second Mu Empire. Their airforce includes mini-carriage-like fighter jets and battleships with frowning face plates. Eventually, on Kubilai's birthday, Fuuma celebrates by systematically destroying every planet while pressing hard on their goal to conquer Earth. But once Kubilai is killed, Fuuma disbands as the palace self-destructs just as they nearly dominated the entire universe.

- Great Emperor Kubilai (大帝王クビライ, Daiteiō Kubirai)
  (name derived from Shakespeare's King Lear | also known as Fuuma Lei-Ar in the Philippine dub). The three red-eyed former rulers of the Mu Empire (ムー帝国, Mū Teikoku), Kubilai corrupted the hearts and minds of humanity long ago until the warrior Shaider came and slaughtered his son Rahu and daughter-in-law and vanquished the evils of the world. Losing his snake-armed body in the process, Kubilai was reduced to a giant, golden head, and he embedded himself in the wall of the Fuuma Palace's throne room where he rules Fuuma while a new robotic body was being built for him. When he found the resting place of his ancient foe and the prison holding his body, Kubilai went to great lengths to ensure his weakness, his third eye, would not be revealed. When Shaider storms his palace, Kubilai unveils his robot body and takes Shaider into the Fushigi Dimension for an epic final battle. After detaching from his robot body, Kubilai meets his end when Shaider plunged his Laser Blade into Kubilai's third eye and then used Shaider's Blue Flash to finish him.
  - Kubilai Body (クビライ胴体, Kubirai Dōtai)
    Sealed within the Eastern cave where Dai found the ruins by the Warrior Shaider, Kubilai's headless body grew several more tentacled limbs with one-eyed snake-like heads on the ends and an eye protruding from its neck. When Dai broke the seal to find the means to stop Kubilai's head, he unwittingly revived the body, and he hunts Shaider to take out his pent-up rage on. Managing to trick the body into the cave's entrance in order to blind it, Shaider manages to blow off all of his tendrils and then defeat the body with the Shaider Blue Flash before it could regenerate. The monster managed to mock Shaider when he is trapped in the chamber before being killed for good.
- Priest Poe (神官ポー, Shinkan Pō)
  Kubilai's 15,000-year-old grandkid who serves as advisor and strategist, wearing elegant white robes with a horned, immense oval-shaped headdress and the "Sky Cutter" scepter through which they shoot blue beams from its core. As a high priest with telekinetic abilities, Poe presides over the Fushigi Beast birth and Fushigi Dimension Generation ceremonies. Poe also drinks an elixir made somehow from young girls and Kubilai's energy every 500 years to maintain their youthful appearance or their face assumes its actual corpse-like appearance and they would die. Having nightmares about the Nazca images, yet soothed by a mark on their staff, Poe wanted to find out the meaning behind it. It was only after Kubilai reveals the full story to them that Poe becomes more determined to kill Shaider to the point of taking part in later attacks on Shaider to avenge their parents and Mu. After Hessler and Girls 1 and 3 die, Poes arrives on Easter Island to go all out in killing Shaider through their "Phantom Showtime" torture with the aid of the remaining Girls and the Beasts. However, Shaider manages to escape the trap, though Poe later destroys the entrance to the prison of Kubilai's Body to trap Shaider. When Kubilai is killed, Poe loses the means to stay young and fades away into nothingness alongside the Beasts.
- Commander Hessler (へスラー指揮官, Hesurā Shikikan)
  A sword-wielding field operative in black armor. Hessler oversees the attacks on Earth. He is a proud yet easily irritated warrior. Though he encouraged Himley to fight alongside him, Hessler started to regret the decision when Girls 1 and 2 point out to him that his brother might upstage him. Driven by the justified paranoia, Hessler mortally wounds his brother during their fight with Shaider and leaves him to die. After the death of Girl 1, Hessler heads to Eastern Island to confront Shaider as he makes his way to the ruins. Their duel transverses from Easter Island to the Fushigi Dimension where Hessler falls to Shaider's Shaider Blue Flash.
- Himley (ヒムリー, Himurī)
  Hessler's younger brother, dressed in spider-like armor and armed with two swords and a trident. His powers include a pair of swords, a trident, eye beams, and purple hand lightning. Undergoing the same training as Hessler, Himley gains Kubilai's blessing to aid his brother. Using a Batian Tarantula, and playing on Shaider's kindness for children, Himley manages to poison him before fighting him as the paralysis starts to take effect. After Shaider escapes, managing to get cured in time, Himley is given a golden sword as a reward along with the favor of Girls 3-5. However, this goes to Himley's head as he plots taking his brother's place as Fuuma's general. Though he nearly killed Shaider, Himley ends up being killed in a sneak attack inflicted by his brother. Himley was not sent To the Fushigi Dimension during the final fight with Shaider.
- Girls' Army (ギャル軍団, Gyaru Gundan)
  A team of five deadly kunoichi trained in the most vicious and dangerous arts of combat led by Girl 1. The other members include the purple-suited Girl 2 (ギャル2, Gyaru Ni), the red-suited Girl 3 (ギャル3, Gyaru San), the green-suited Girl 4 (ギャル4, Gyaru Yon), and the pink-suited Girl 5 (ギャル5, Gyaru Go). They serve under Hessler and battle Shaider and Annie on every Fuuma Mission. While Girl 3 performed a suicide attack at Hessler's command in an attempt to kill Shaider, the remaining members help Po in stopping Shaider from finding out Kubilai's secret. Soon after capturing Annie and Shaider arrives to save her, the three Girls allow Kubilai to devour them into their combined bat form to kill Shaider.
  - Girl 1 (ギャル1, Gyaru Ichi)
    The black-suited leader of the Girl's Army, Hessler's right hand. On Kubilai's birthday, Girl 1 offers to personally kill Shaider and Annie for her master. To achieve that goal, Girl 1 uses Fuuma science to become a black-armored cyborg with various concealed weapons. However, though her body is destroyed by Shaider, the spell Po cast on her during the operation takes effects as Girl 1's astral self possesses Annie to have her sabotage Vavilos. When Shaider intervenes, Girl 1 becomes tangible battles Shaider as they take their fight into the Fushigi Dimension where her powers are magnified. But in the end, Shaider kills her for good with Video Beam on the source of her life after disrupting her form with Shaider Blue Flash.
- Beasts (珍獣, Yajū)
  The low level creatures of Fuuma present in the throne room who sometimes aid in Fuuma missions that require them to assume forms. Composed of the child-like flutist Yaada (ヤーダ, Yāda), the gray-trunked Nossori (ノッソリ, Nossori), the insectoid Singing Shingin (歌うたいのシンギン, Utautai no Shingin), the pot-bellied Hungry Gaaki (腹ペコのガーキ, Fukupeko no Gāki), and the stone-like One-Eyed Aiida (一つ目のアイーダ, Hitotsumu no Aīda). The other member of their group named Upper Half Monk (上半身のモンク, Kohanmi no Monku) is fastened to the wall and thus is more of a decoration than an agent of Fuuma. After Kubilai's death, the Beasts faded out of existence along with Poe.
- Miracler Combatmen (戦闘員ミラクラー, Sentōin Mirakurā)
  The followers of Fuuma who wear Rangda-style masks with big round eyes and fanged mouths armed with hatchets and rifles. They act either as foot soldiers or as pilots for the carriage-shaped aircraft. Shaider occasionally pummels them before going on to fight the Strange Beasts. Destroyed at the end of the series when the fortress crumbled apart and exploded.

==== Fushigi Beasts ====
The Fushigi Beasts (不思議獣, Fushigijū) are psychedelic, deceptively comical-looking creatures that Kubilai "gives birth" to in the form of pearls called Fushigi Beast Eggs (不思議獣卵, Fushigijū Tama) using a special ceremony with the help of Poe. Placed within boiling Fushigi Seawater, the pearl enlarges into a giant egg that Kubilai hatches with his beam. Their naming system is two syllables, then those two syllable repeated. According to Poe in episode 5 they are considered as Kubilai's offspring, not just creations. During a fight with Shaider, a Fushigi Beast retreats into a Fushigi Dimension (不思議次元, Fushijigen) where it becomes four times more powerful in an attempt to get the upper hand against Shaider along with using the realm itself as a weapon.

- Balibali (バリバリ, Baribari)
  A green and red Fushigi Beast with a Rangda-like face, using a spear, and able to roll into a ball. Its powers include super speed, levitation, teleportation, size changing, turning into a giant anemone, an explosive spear, and a sword. It was sent to Earth in order to ensure Fuuma's scheme to using the Fushigi Song to send people into a berserker rage via a pirated broadcast. When Shaider arrives to stop it, Balibali is deployed to deal with him. After Shaider destroys the broadcast source, Balibali escapes into th Fushigi Dimension with the Star Sheriff in pursuit. Balibali tries to kill Shaider in both giant and normal-sized forms before the Star Sheriff destroys it with his Shaider Blue Flash.
- Petpet (ペトペト, Petopeto)
  A hideous canine/Garuda Fushigi Beast with eyeball bombs and a long tongue. Its powers include a human disguise, emitting the petopeto virus which forces animals to become berserk, explosive boomerangs, a zambatou, a long tongue, teleportation, size changing, choking gas from the mouth, and eye bombs. Petpet assumes the form of a dwarf trumpeter and takes some of the Beasts incognito as a carnival band so they can parade around town while shooting particles from his mouth to drive any animal infected into a crazed carrier that passes the madness into other animals. Managing to track Petpet down with Annie's help, Shaider chases the Fushigi Beast into the Fushigi Dimension where the monster uses the environment to his advantage before Shaider uses his Shaider Blue Flash to destroy Petpet.
- Girugiru (ギルギル, Girugiru)
  A green plant monster. Its powers include a halberd with a machine gun, high jumping, invisibility, and choking from the trunk. Girugiru was created in a plan to keep the Star Sheriffs from interfering by exposing Annie to altered delusion-inducing, with Girugiru and the Rare Beasts disguising themselves as the rest of her family to trick her into attacking her partner. Once Annie snaps out of the deception, Shaider chases Girugiru into the Fushigi Dimension and destroys it with Shaider Blue Flash.
- Meromero (メロメロ, Meromero)
  A purple skull-faced witch/vampire Fushigi Beast with a ram-headed staff, Meromero disguised herself as a witch to lure children with delusions of magic they can be switched with the Beasts posing as them in animal form so that the real children can be turned into loyal animal-human hybrids to manipulate their parents into submission. When Dai gets involved, he manages to find the lab at an amusement park with the aid of Yohko's dog. With Annie providing cover, Shaider manages to restore the mutated children and destroy the lab. As Annie takes the captive children and Yohko to safety, Shaider pursue Meromero into the Fushigi Dimension where it gained the ability to disappear and attack him out of nowhere, but Shaider uses his Shaider Scope to counter before destroying with Shaider Blue Flash. Its powers include a witch and butterfly disguise, a staff with teleportation properties and can emit explosions, retracting into her levitation cloak, invisibility, and telekinesis.
- Mujimuji (ムジムジ, Mujimuji)
  An oversized staff-wielding silkworm Fushigi Beast that looks like it is attached to an unspecified creature with a goofy looking face. Its powers include mouth webs that can cocoon humans in seconds, a staff with a torch at the end, invisibility, and a sword. Mujimuji is used in a scheme to make hard working people lazy. With the Girl' Army spreading rumors about the monster as an enlightened being, they gathered hard working people to become lazy gluttons before entering a chrysalis state to eventually become worm-like creatures. However, the incident gets Dai's Attention when Girl 1 kidnaps Yohko for a forced conversion after being brushed off. When Annie is captured during her infiltration, Shaider saves her from becoming a chrysalis before fighting Mujimuji as Annie takes his potential victims to safety. Taking the fight to the Fushigi Dimension, Mujimuji overpowers Shaider with its silk attacks until it was destroyed by the Shaider Blue Flash with his victims restore to normal.
- Gokugoku (ゴクゴク, Gokugoku)
  A cook/armadillo/ingredients-based Fushigi Beast with a bowl-like hat who creates food and beverages that gives whoever eats it telekinetic powers in a scheme to have the bullied children take revenge on their tormentors. Its powers include teleportation, a high body temperature, a mentally controlled set of an oversized fork and butter knife with explosive properties, and a machine gun in each fork tip. Gokugoku's food was first tested on a depressed child named Shigeru who attacked not only the bullies, but his PE coach and his own family with before collapsing once losing the last of his powers. Shigeru's sudden change catches Dai's attention as Fuuma starts recruiting more bullied kids to cause chaos. Using the cat Shigeru discarded, Dai finds the boy as he is force-fed by the Girls Army. Once having Annie take Shigeru out of harm's way, Shaider battles Gokugoku before they enter the Fushigi Dimension. Using his knife and fork on Shaider, Gokugoku is destroyed by the Shaider Blue Flash.
- Barabara (バラバラ, Barabara)
  A Fushigi Beast based on the Rose Animal, a proposed giant frog/rose hybrid, who was sent after the biotechnology scientist Dr. Katori to get the data to create actual rose animals to ravage cities. Its powers include a detachable pedal cloak, a throned spear with a machine gun, high jumping, teleportation, size growth, and finger beams. Barabara was only created as a countermeasure when Dai offers to protect Dr. Katori's daughter Ayako when she is targeted when the scientist refused to give the Girls Army his research. After Barabara renders Annie powerless with its rose petals, Fuuma gains the CD holding the Rose Animal data until Shaider arrives and destroys it in the ensuing fight. Fighting Barabara in the Fushigi Dimension, Shaider manages to impale the monster with its own weapon before finishing it off with the Shaider Blue Flash.
- Kerokero (ケロケロ, Kerokero)
  A green cobra Fushigi Beast with a mantis-like head and torso coming out of its head. Its powers include a ringed staff, a human disguise, high jumping, invisibility, telepathic explosions, and can survive decapitation. Kerokero was created help Hessler capture a rebelling teenage girl named Yukari, who is actually the princess of Planet Freyn that sent to Earth during Fuuma's genocide to be safe until she is of proper age to return to her home world with the other survivors and rebuilt it. When Dai and Annie uncover the truth, Yukari refused to believe it and was captured by Fuuma as she runs off when brought to where the earth-bound Freynians are to gather. After saving Yukari, Shaider battles Hesseler's group and Fuuma aircraft before chasing Kerokero into the Fushigi Dimension. After chopping its head off, Shaider destroys Kerokero with the Blue Shaider Flash. Soon after, Yukari finally leaves for Freyn. Note: the Space Sheriff Gavan laser blade theme was used for destroying Kerokero.
- Tamtam (タムタム, Tamutamu)
  A Fushigi Beast with taikos for pectorals that allow it to teleport and armed with a mallet and twin swords. Its powers include hypnotic taikos, holograms, a staff, teleportation, dividing into three guitar ninjas, and a pair of swords. Tamtam's ability to manipulate music is used in a scheme to make the children into Fuuma's devoted servants. Tamtam first uses the music of the brainwashed Blue Boys band and using it to corrupt the minds of the youth. Investigating the concert and unable confirm Fuuma's influence, Dai finds the band. Fuuma then starts the next phrase by ensuring the parents would the Blue Boys Band due to their children flunking, luring the children into a concert with Tamtam and a few Beasts posing as the Blue Boys. However, Dai and Annie crashed the concert, saving the captive audience and the real band. Chasing Tamtam into the Fushigi Dimension, Shaider battles guitarists in gas masks and a giant mallet drumstick before destroying the Fushigi Beast with Shaider Blue Flash.
- Paspas (パスパス, Pasupasu)
  A college professor Fushigi Beast with a large hardback book embedded in its chest. Its powers include telekinesis through music, holograms, a large quill sword armed with a machine gun, size changing, teleportation, and invisibility. Able to manipulate dolls with its music, Paspas targeted children to teach them the Fuumese language and spread it like wildfire. Dai learns of the scheme when he encountered a group children who have no recollection of being out. When Dai starts getting too close, Paspas aid Hessler and Girls Army in attacking him until he escapes in Vavilos. Once the parents finally believe Dai after seeing Paspas' work themselves, he and Annie disguise themselves as stuffed animals to wait out the Fushigi Beast. After gaining access to Paspas' dimension, Shaider made his move. As Annie gets the children to safety, Shaider battles Paspas in the Fushigi Dimension before destroying it with Shaider Blue Flash.
- Getogeto (ゲトゲト, Getogeto)
  A prison officer-themed Fushigi Beast with a cell door as part of its collar and a pinwheel staff. Its powers include teleportation, shrinking objects while placing them in his mouth, high jumping, a five-hooked staff that emits electric surges and has a machine gun, encasing opponents in a glass ball, and size changing. Getogeto is used in a Fuuma scheme to abduct child prodigies to be enhanced for a ten-year plot to conquer Japan incognito. However, Annie manages to allow herself to be captured while in disguise so she can free the kids as Shaider arrives to her location. As Annie takes the children to safety, Shaider pursues Getogeto into the Fushigi Dimension where the Fushigi Beast overpowers with its mirror-themed powers until Shaider destroys it with his Shaider Blue Flash.
- Roborobo (ロボロボ, Roborobo)
  A robotic Fushigi Beast with a mouth-less humanoid face with wing decorations and a mouth on its chest Its powers include commanding robot children, a staff with a wrench on the end, high jumping, size changing, face flames, summoning three swordsmen with explosive capes and hand rockets, and a machine gun in the scalp. Roborobo was used Fuuma's scheme to supplant children with robotic duplicates and eventually eliminate the real one. When they piece together the plan, they save Genta as he is attacked by his robot double, forcing the robot into its true form as they follow it to Hessler and Roborobo. Pursuing Roborobo into the Fushigi Dimension, Shaider battles the Fushigi Beast and its three phantom-masked warriors before using the Shaider Blue Flash to destroy Roborobo, with all the robot duplicates evaporating as a result.
- Kotokoto (コトコト, Kotokoto)
  An Olympic athlete Fushigi Beast with a trophy-like head, iron weights on his shoulders, a gold medal around its neck, and an arsenal of Olympic-themed weapons. Its powers include a large wrecking ball, high jumping, size changing, a gun in the right hand, an explosive ring, speed, teleportation, a pullvolt, invisibility, and a sword. Kotokoto was used in Hessler's scheme to lure promising athletes into an underground gym to make them into Fuuma followers by taking out her competition. When Dai noticed such a change in girl named Haruka, he and Annie managed to find the underground gym break Fuuma's hold over the athletes. As Annie takes the athletes to safety, Shaider pursues Kotokoto to the Fushigi Dimension and splits the monster's head in half with Shaider Blue Flash.
- Guriguri (グリグリ, Guriguri)
  A yellow/gold/black-colored dragon-like Fushigi Beast with a large, open, fanged filled fire-spewing mouth above one set of eyes with another set on the sides of its head. Its powers include possession, a cutlass with a machine gun in the tip, high jumping, size changing, mouth flames, invisibility, teleportation, and summoning cross bombs. Guriguri was created to pursue Jimmy Kitahra, who mutated after being exposed to time warp radiation. As Jimmy believed Mariko to be her aunt, his love Kiriko, Fuuma had Guriguri possess her to capture Jimmy in order to duplicate his molecular-bending powers for their plans. However, Shaider intervenes and chases Guriguri into the Fushigi Dimension, stabbing the monster with its own sword before finishing it off with the Shaider Blue Flash.
- Gamegame (ガメガメ, Gamegame)
  A tusked turtle Fushigi Beast armed with a trident who breathes fire and smoke. Its powers include swimming, high jumping, a trident with a machine gun in each spear, teleportation, summoning a cage, size changing, flammable mouth mist, and summoning four harpooners with grenades. Gamegame was created to go after the last three survivors of Planet Marine and their golden turtle until Shaider drove it off. When Gamegame goes after the Marinians, Shaider chased it into the Fushigi Dimension, fighting it and its phantom-masked warriors until Shaider runs the monster through with its own weapon before destroying it with Shaider Blue Flash while the Marinians leave for Earth's seas.
- Bokeboke (ボケボケ, Bokeboke)
  A scaly, green frilled lizard Fushigi Beast designed for the purpose of destroying Shaider. Its powers include a reflective torso, mouth energy blasts, size changing, high jumping, choking gas from the mouth, teleportation, and dividing into three swordsmen. It overpowers Shaider in his first encounters until Annie arrives and blasts the monster in the back of the head, causing it to go into state of confusion and drives Hessler away before shrinking into a fairly harmless and cute lizard creature that is found by Kochirou. While Bokeboke runs off into a nearby household, Fuuma searches for their creation to restore it to true form with twice the power. After Bokeboke regains it normal form, Shaider manages to hit it in the back with his Laser Blade before chasing into the Fushigi Dimension where he destroys it with Shaider Blue Flash after stabbing it in the head.
- Girigiri (ギリギリ, Girigiri)
  A Moai-topped explorer-themed Fushigi Beast armed with the ability to conjure giant levitating stone heads. Its powers include a shovel-machine gun hybrid staff, retracting into his Moai-like helmet, size changing, mouth flames, dividing into three swordsmen, and high jumping. Created in response to Poe having dreams, it was sent with the Girls' Army after Dr. Asai to get his aid in translating the Nazca images. After managing to save Dr. Asai and his daughter, Shaider pursues Girigiri into the Fushigi Dimension and manages to chop its hat off before destroying it with his Shaider Blue Flash.
- Muumuu (ムームー, Mūmū)
  A multi-colored armored Tlaloc-themed Fushigi Beast. Its powers include a memory-scanning helmet, a mentally controlled trident that emits electric surges and has a machine gun, size changing, explosive mouth webs, and teleportation. Muumuu was created to capture Annie in a scheme to force Dai to reveal the meaning behind the Nazca images. After saving Annie, Shaider chases Mumu into the Fushigi Dimension and manages to impale with its own trident before destroying it with the Shaider Blue Flash.
- Magmag (マグマグ, Magmag)
  A magnet-themed Fushigi Beast with magnet shapes on its forearms. Its powers include a pair of powerful wrist magnets, a trident, magnetic rays from the wrist magnets, and high jumping. Magmag was created by Poe after reviewing Shaider's fighting style and arsenal, designing the monster to use its magnet-forearms to cause Shaider's Combat Suit to malfunction. The attack also effected Dai's self-confidence as perfects his swordsmanship while Magmag kidnaps a bus full of children so Fuuma can rig it to explode to call the Space Sheriff out. After finishing his training, Shaider arrives to Annie's aid and overcomes Magmag's magnetism, destroying the Fushigi Beast with Shaider Blue Flash. This monster was not sent to the Fushigi Dimension during Shaider's final battle with it.
- Shigishigi (シギシギ, Shigishigi)
  A green, thorny unspecified plant Fushigi Beast with an eye in its mouth. Its powers include spawning Fushigi Song Flowers that make people violent, teleportation, a human disguise, high jumping, a spear, size changing, mouth sparks and mist, summoning an entrapping flower, and dividing into three spearmen. Growing Fushigi Song Flowers on its body, Shigishigu to spread them across the city to brainwash whoever sniffs them enter a state of bliss before becoming dangerously violent as part of a plan to have the human race destroy itself. As Dai and Annie were vaccinated on Planet Bird, they were unaffected and attempt to destroy as many Fushigi flowers as an antidote is created. When Shigishigi causes a potential World War III, Shaider baits the Monster into a trap to fight it. Chasing Shigishigi into the Fushigi Dimension, Shaider destroys it with Shaider Blue Flash after stabbing it with its own weapon.
- Surisuri (スリスリ, Surisuri)
  A camera operator/Tenome-themed Fushigi Beast. Its powers include a human disguise, a camera that creates magical illusions, teleportation, a cane with a blade at the butt, size changing, and explosive flashes from his camera. This monster was not sent To the Fushigi Dimension. Surisuri poses as a photographer, having Chiharu's family care for Yaada in a cuckoo family experiment to destroy social ties through imprinting. Annie gets involved and is affected by Surisuri's spell, seeing the Fushigi Beast as Shaider as the real one comes to her aid immune to Surisuri's spell due to his Combat Suit's visor. Developing contact lens from the visor material, Dai and Annie infiltrate the Fuuma base. Chasing Surisuri into the Fushigi Dimension, Shaider stabs him with his cane before destroying him with the Shaider Blue Flash.
- Umiumi (ウミウミ, Umiumi)
  A sea monster-themed Fushigi Beast with a jellyfish head that has two mouths, starfish hands, and wields a fin-blade halbard as its weapon. Its powers include swimming, a zambatou, size changing, summoning six-gilled sharks, dividing into three swordsmen, and teleportation. This monster was not sent To the Fushigi Dimension. It was created to capture women on Namegawa Island to be scientifically altered into Marinian-like beings to serve Fuuma, capturing Dr. Koshirou and Yoko as a result. However, a prototype gillman leads Dai to their base of operations before being killed off. Freeing the Fuuma captives, Shaider pursues Umiumi to the Fushigi Dimension. Fighting the monster's giant sharks and phantom-masked grunts, Shaider destroys Umiumi with Shaider Blue Flash.
- Gasgas (ガスガス, Garugasu)
  A spiked torture equipment-themed Fushigi Beast with nunchaku that's able to spew gas. Its powers include invisibility, a chained mace and kanabo that can emit electric shocks, high jumping, choking mouth gas, telekinesis, teleportation, size changing, eye bombs, dividing into three swordsmen with choking gas and laser guns, and a sword that emits sparks. Gasgas was created as part of a Fuuma scheme to use the anti-Vavilos device they developed to negate Shaider's remote transformation. When Dai falls for the trap, he is unable to become Shaider as he is forced to run for his life while subjected to the poison gas. However, Annie actives the Shokatsu System manually to save Shaider as he proceeds to destroy the machine. Chasing Gasgas into the Fushigi Dimension, Shaider fights through the monster's red-helmeted, commando-garbed grunts before knocking the monster's broadsword away to destroy it with Shaider Blue Flash.
- Lovelove (ラブラブ, Raburabu)
  A white winged unicorn-themed Fushigi Beast in red armor. Its powers include creating a pocket dimension, a mentally controlled scythe-like spear, mental explosions, a human disguise, teleportation, and high jumping. Lovelove aided Poe in the guise of a trumpet-playing barkeep to abduct pretty women along with Annie. However, Shaider saves Annie and chases Lovelove into the Fushigi Dimension, destroying him with Shaider Blue Flash.
- Psypsy (サイサイ, Saisai)
  A gray psychic Fushigi Beast that wields a spiked club. Its powers include a human disguise, telekinesis, a staff with a mace on the end that emits electric bolts, and teleportation. Psypsy posed as Akane's father to have her assume the identity of Esper Queen to cause chaos with her Esper Army gang. When Shaider gets involved and exposes his scheme, Psypsy assumes his true form. Chasing Psypsy into the Fushigi Dimension, Shaider destroys him with Shaider Blue Flash.
- Kamikami (カミカミ, Kamikami)
  A Daoshi-headed Fushigi Beast with a trident. Its powers include invisibility, spawning hypnotic stone heads of Kubali, high jumping, a mentally controlled double sided trident with a machine gun in each tip, and teleportation. Kamikami was used in a scheme to convert the populace of the New Town community into a Kubilai-worshipping cult. Shaider started investigating the strange events around the Yoshida family, destroying the Kubailai idol to free New Town folk. Shaider then chases Kamikami into the Fushigi Dimension and destroys the Fushigi Beast with Shaider Blue Flash.
- Deathdeath (デスデス, Desudesu)
  A scaly gladiator-themed Fushigi Beast in a green fur mantle with horns on his head. Its powers include a human disguise, bull horns, a sword, teleportation, size changing, and pink energy balls from the hands. Posing as a Caesar-like figure, Deathdeath oversaw the combat between Girda and Billy Shinigami, converted into Fuuma cyborgs, massacre athletes kidnapped and drugged by Fuuma. One learning the truth, Shaider defeats the cyborgs and frees the athletes before chasing Deathdeath into the Fushigi Dimension, knocking the monster's sword away and then destroys him with Shaider Blue Flash.
- Itoito (イトイト, Itoito)
  A wool spindle-headed Fushigi Beast with a sheep's head and front legs protruding from its pelvis, and moth-like wings. Its powers include making fibers that turn humans violent, a spear with a pair of large scissors on the end that shoot lasers, summoning a pair of large boots, mouth flames, dividing into three men with electric cloths, and high jumping. Hessler and the Girl's Army use the wool from Itoito to manufacture clothing that gives the user super powers with a violent side effect, testing on the clothes on children before making a clothing line for adults. Annie infiltrates the store front, donning various guises to stop the production at its source. As Annie accomplishes in her mission, Shaider chases Itoito into the Fushigi Dimension and destroys it with Shaider Blue Flash.
- Buyobuyo (ブヨブヨ, Buyobuyo)
  A four-tusked Ukiyo-e-inspired elephant-like Fushigi Beast with an extendable trunk-like tendril and a star-bladed spear. Its powers include disguising itself as a tent-like mat, teleportation, telekinesis, illusions, an extendable trunk, a mentally controlled staff with a star blade on the end, and high jumping. Buyobuyo was created to assist in Fuuma's black market scheme involving child slavery by posing as a Goony Mat funhouse. Despite Hessler's precautions for the Shaian, Shaider manages to force his way into the base to free Annie and the children. After blasting the Fuuma base to bits, Shaider destroys Buyobuyo with Shaider Blue Flash.
- Fumafuma (フマフマ, Fumafuma)
  A furry white Kappa/monkey-like Fushigi Beasts with large fangs. They were created as part of a plan to make use of the premature Fushigi Beast Eggs Kubilai sneezed out while suffering a head cold, selling them off as "canned pets" Fumafuma of Amazon. The Fumafuma would be bought by children as Fuuma converts one of the Fumafuma with a growth elixir and have it command the smaller ones to attack the humans. After Shaider takes out the Fumafuma manufacture plant, he and Annie track down the modified Fumafuma as it gathers its army and go on a rampage. When Shaider arrives to Annie's aid, the Fumafuma fuse into a single Kappa/monkey-like form that could blast electricity and wield an electric trident. In the end, Shaider destroys the Fumafuma monster with Shaider Blue Flash.
- Karikari (カリカリ, Kaikari)
  A triple-headed eagle Fushigi Beast in armor. Its powers include a lance-like trident, a rotatable set of three eagle heads, a mouth gun, teleportation, and high jumping. Karikari was created to aid Fuuma's Darkian allies in capturing the Cureian prince Ozma. As Annie takes Ozma and Tamiko to safety, Shaider defeats the boy's Darkian pursuers before chasing Karikari into the Fushigi Dimension. Managing to impale Karikari with its own weapon, Shaider destroys it with Shaider Blue Flash.
- Marimari (メリメリ, Merimeri)
  A white doll Fushigi Beast mutant with a large, creepy, smiling mouth and a cutlass. Its powers include a human disguise, controlling dummies, immobilizing humans, a sword, a shield, high jumping, size changing, choking gas from the mouth, and invisibility. Posing a ventriloquist and using an animated puppet named Sakura, Marimari captures children to make into his marionettes. When Shaider intervening, Marimari captures Annie to add her to his collection. Once he destroys Sakura to break Marimari's hold over his victims so Annie can get the children to safety, Shaider pursues the Fushigi Beast into the Fushigi Dimension and destroys it with Shaider Blue Flash.
- Kagekage (カゲカゲ, Kagekage)
  A bug-eyed snake/insect-like Fushigi Beast. Its powers include a halberd, illusions, a human disguise, a tentacle in the right arm, teleportation, converting into toxic green slime, size changing, and eye tractor beams. Kagekage was created by Kubilai to destroy the dig site in order to conceal his weakness. After stealing the gold tablet from the dig site, Kagekage assumes a slime form to capture Shaider as Poe attempts to kill him. Upon breaking free however, Shaider forces Kagekage off him as they take their fight to Fushigi Dimension, blasting the monster to bits with the Video Beam.
- Daridari (ダリダリ, Daridai)
  A dog-faced Fushigi Beast. Its powers include a long sword with a hidden machine gun, a human disguise, high jumping, spawning arrow-like harpoons, size changing, mouth flames, teleportation, and invisibility. Daridari assumes the form of Dai's father, Professor Daijiro Sawamura, to lure him a trap so he can be killed. However, Annie frees Shaider as he chases Daridari into the Fushigi Dimension and destroys it with Shaider Blue Flash.
- Comcom (コンコン, Concon)
  A computer-headed owl-themed Fushigi Beast armed with a broadsword. Its powers include spawning dream computers, high jumping, a sword, teleportation, size changing, hot sparks from the mouth, summoning pipes that emit hot sparks, and summoning a fake Shaider. Comcom was created to produce a supply of Yumecom, computers designed to grant the desires of whatever typed in it, in a scheme to induce laziness. When Dai gets to the bottom of it sometime after raiding on a factory, he and Annie eventually find Fuuma's base of operations and destroy it. Chasing Comcom into the Fushigi Dimension, fighting a duplicate of himself in the process, Shaider manages to destroy the Fushigi Beast with Shaider Blue Flash.
- Guchiguchi (グチグチ, Guchiguchi)
  A Fushigi Beast with a head resembling human lips with fangs who uses a sword and shield as his weapon. Its powers include high jumping, a pair of swords, a round shield, teleportation, a human disguise, hypnosis, mouth flames, summoning five soldiers, spitting spears, and size changing. Assuming a human form called General Guchi, Guchiguchi recruits teenagers to create a foul-tempered army large enough to cause a world war and overwhelm Shaider. Using a homing beacon place in a truck holding captive teens, Annie finds the training grounds as Shaider arrives to provide back up. Chasing Guchiguchi into the Fushigi Dimension, forcing him into his true form while disarming him, Shaider destroys the Fushigi Beast with Shaider Blue Flash to break its hold over the teens.
- Moviemovie (ムビムビ, Mobimobi)
  A red Fushigi Beast of indeterminate species with a movie camera on top of its head. Its powers include turning into a film camera, a cane that emits electric shocks, teleportation, high jumping, spawning mirages from the forehead camera, and invisibility. Moviemovie poses as a video camera used in the filming of Mashoujo Cinderella with child actress Sei starring in a Fuuma directed movie in hopes to encouraging bad behavior towards it target viewers. Going into the Fushigi Dimension to stop Sei from unknowingly killing her costar, Shaider battles Moviemovie and destroys it with Shaider Blue Flash.
- Satasata (サタサタ, SataSata)
  A black Santa Claus-suited Satan-themed Fushigi Beast with kudu-like horns and bat-like wings. Its powers include a drill lance that emits explosions and fire with a machine gun in the drill, a black Santa Claus disguise, teleportation, a pocket dimension, size changing choking mouth mist, and invisibility. Satasata posed as "Satan Claus" and visited all the boys and girls to take their presents and then creates an Anti-Santa cult, converting children into his masked followers to commit acts of violence. After freeing the children from Satasata's influence and forcing him into his true form, Shaider chases the Fushigi Beast into the Fushigi Dimension and destroys it with Shaider Blue Flash.
- Terotero (テロテロ, TeroTero)
  A green fish-like Fushigi Beast with secondary bug-eyes on its neck along with a drill-arm attachment, that's able to use a giant mallet and morning star. Its powers include laser absorbing, summoning a drill on the right arm, a body strong enough to survive several thousand foot drops, a claw hammer that can turn into a wrecking ball-like mace, and high jumping. This monster was not sent To the Fushigi Dimension. Terotero was created in a Fuuma scheme to take down Vavilos when Annie unknowingly brought it into the ship as an Fushigi Beast Egg within a plush bunny. Once hatched, Terotero evaded Annie as she unknowingly matures it with her laser. Using the primary Blue Plasma System, Annie manages to activate the secondary system in time as Shaider fall into Hessler's trap. Managing to drag Terotero out of the Vavilos, Shaider disarms the Fushigi Beast before destroying it with the Shaider Blue Flash.
- Pairpair (ペアペア, Paruparu)
  A white Cupid-themed Fushigi Beast with a heart-shaped chest armed with a heart-bladed staff. Its powers include manipulating love hormones, a large heart arrow that fires heart bombs, teleportation, mouth needles, and high jumping. It was created in a scheme to destroy the bond between Shaider and Annie by making Vivian fall in love with the former. Pairpair later hold Shaider at by while Vivian carries out Fuuma's plan to destroy Vavilos. Chasing Pairpair into the Fushigi Dimension, Shaider impales the Fushigi Beast with its own weapon before destroying it with Shaider Blue Flash.
- Hebihebi (ヘビヘビ, Hebihebi)
  A blue snake Fushigi Beast armed with a trident. Its powers include a human disguise, teleportation, an electric staff with coiling ribbons, size changing, hot mouth sparks, summoning six ribbon twirlers, mouth energy bolts, and high jumping. It posed as the teacher Miss Mitsuru to gather bullies in classroom 6-0, seemingly making them good in the public eye via her piano playing. However, in reality, she makes them into dangerous sociopaths. However, when Shaider uncovers the scheme, Hebihebi battles the Space Sheriff as they take their battle to the Fushigi Dimension where she is destroyed by Shaider Blue Flash after being impaled by her own weapon.
- Tsutatsuta (ツタツタ, Tsutatsuta)
  An ivy-themed Fushigi Beast and he last of the Fushigi Beasts to be created, sent to Earth in the form of a sapphire egg to a middle class Ikeda family in an experiment to undermine Japan's social class system. Its powers include spawning explosive vines from the body that can emit electric shocks, size changing, a whip tongue, extendable arms, teleportation, a leaf-like trident, and eye energy bolts. Once fully grown into his plant-like form with ravenous hunger, Tsutasuta devours the family dog Jiro and forces the Ikeda family to buy a vast amount of food to the point of putting them in massive debt. After getting the family to safety, Shaider chases Tsutatsuta into the Fushigi Dimension and destroys him with Shaider Blue Flash.

=== Movie-exclusive villains ===
- Meteor Gunman Omega (流れ星のガンマン オメガ, Ryuseino Ganman Omega)
  An alien assassin who makes a living been hunting down Space Sheriffs, previously fighting Gavan and later Sharivan. Arriving to Earth, adapting a helmet, twin shoulder cannons, and other weapons into his fighting style after losing to Gavan and Sharivan, Omega targeted Shaider and challenges him to a fight to the death. However, Hessler and the Girls' Army intervene out of pride by holding Annie and children hostage, Omega stops them from killing Shaider. Soon after saving the children, Shaider battles Omega with Annie and Fuuma as witnesses as Omega finally falls to Shaider's Blue Flash.
- Muchimuchi
  A large worm-tentacled Fushigi Beast of indeterminate species. Its powers include a human disguise, dimensional warping, tongue spears, teleportation, spawning clones, waist tentacles, size changing, mouth flames, and green tentacle energy bolts. Muchimuchi poses as an old man to kidnap genius children to use them in their plan to take over the universe as child soldiers. With Shaider faking his death, he and Annie manage to save the abducted children. Chasing Muchimuchi into the Fushigi Dimension, Shaider destroys it with Shaider Blue Flash.

== Cast ==
- Dai Sawamura/Shaider
  Hiroshi Tsuburaya
- Annie
  Naomi Morinaga
- Commander Com
  Toshiaki Nishizawa
- Mimi
  Wakiko Kano
- Marin
  Kyoko Nashiro
- Kojiro Oyama/
  Masayuki Suzuki
- Priest Poe
  Jun Yoshida
- Hessler
  Kazuhiko Kubo
- Girl 1
  Keiko Nawa
- Girl 2
  Aya Kanno (1-15)
  Mai Ooishi (16-35)
  Yumiko Yashima (36-48)
- Girl 3
  Yoshimi Kawashima
- Girl 4
  Noriko Kojima
- Girl 5
  Rina Naoi

=== Voice cast ===
- Great Emperor Kubilai
  Shōzō Iizuka
- Narrator
  Tōru Ōhira

== Movies ==
Two movies were also filmed. Space Sheriff Shaider (宇宙刑事シャイダー, Uchū Keiji Shaidā) takes place between episodes 19 and 20, and was released on July 14, 1984. Pursuit! The Strange Kidnappers! (追跡! しぎしぎ誘拐団, Tsuiseki! Shigi-Shigi Yukaidan) takes place between episodes 39 and 40, and was released on December 22, 1984.

- Space Sheriff Shaider (movie)
  - Shozo Uehara (script),
    Hideo Tanaka (director)
- Space Sheriff Shaider -Pursuit! The Strange Kidnappers
  - Shozo Uehara (script),
    Hideo Tanaka (director)

== Songs ==
Opening theme

- "Space Sheriff Shaider" (宇宙刑事シャイダー, Uchū Keiji Shaidā)
  - Lyrics
    Keisuke Yamakawa
  - Composition and Arrangement
    Michiaki Watanabe
  - Artist
    Akira Kushida

Ending theme

- "Hello! Shaider" (ハロー！シャイダー, Harō! Shaidā)
  - Lyrics
    Keisuke Yamakawa
  - Composition and Arrangement
    Michiaki Watanabe
  - Artist
    Akira Kushida

== Video game ==
A video game based on the television series, The Space Sheriff Spirits, was released for the PlayStation 2 system on May 25, 2006, by Bandai Namco. This product was made available in Japan, Hong Kong and Taiwan. The actors for Gavan and Sharivan reprised their roles, but Hiroshi Tsuburaya died before the game was developed, so anime voice actor Takuo Kawamura took over the role of Shaider instead.

== In other countries ==
Space Sheriff Shaider was released in the Philippines as Shaider in the late-1980s, where it became the first tokusatsu show to be dubbed in Filipino on ABS-CBN (1988-1991), IBC (1992-1994), RPN-9 (1997-1999), GMA-7 (2003-2005), Hero TV (2006-2009), and TeleAsia (2015). In this release, Dai Sawamura was renamed, Alexis. Also in this version, Kojiro Oyama is called Doctor Ang, Kubilai is called Fuuma Ley-ar, Priest Poe is called Ida (voiced by a female instead of a male as in the original) and Hessler is called Drigo.

The series was aired on M6 in France under the title Capitaine Sheider. The theme song was performed by Bernard Minet.

The series was also broadcast in Brazil, also under the name Sheider, in the early 1990s. Different from other tokusatsu series in Brazil, Sheider was broadcast on a channel as unpopular as the main ones around that time in Brazil, TV Gazeta, in 1990. As a result, only a few people saw the show. Rede Globo (who was the distributor of the series in Brazil), though one of the most popular television channels, later began broadcasting Sheider in the early morning, around 5 am, in 1992, until it disappeared completely from television.

In 2024, Discotek announced they'll release the series on Blu-Ray in September 2024.
