= A Human Murder Weapon =

- Directed by: Takashi Miike
- Written by: Comic book: Ikki Kajiwara; Nobuo Nakano; Screenplay: Hisao Maki
- Starring: Sylvester A. Anderson; Bill Costa; John Holley
- Cinematography: Hiroshi Nakamura; Shigeru Komatsubara
- Release date: 1992
- Running time: 71 minutes
- Country: Japan
- Language: Japanese

A Human Murder Weapon (人間兇器 愛と怒りのリング, Ningen kyōki: Ai to ikari no ringu) is a 1992 Japanese film directed by Takashi Miike. This is the first of many Miike films to be based on manga, in this case one by Ikki Kajiwara.

== Cast ==
- Megumi Kudo
- Yoshika Maedomari
- Hisao Maki as Teacher Omoto (voice)
- Chika Matsui
- Daisuke Nagekura as Jin
- Atsushi Onita as himself
- Eisaku Shindō
- Combat Toyoda
