= XX: Beautiful Hunter =

- Directed by: Masaru Konuma
- Written by: Hiroshi Takahashi
- Story by: Mangetsu Hanamura
- Produced by: Tsuguo Hattori; Makoto Okada
- Starring: Makiko Kuno; Johnny Okura; Kōji Shimizu
- Cinematography: Seizō Sengen
- Music by: Satoru Nagauchi
- Distributed by: Toei Video
- Release date: August 12, 1994
- Running time: 85 minutes
- Language: Japanese

XX: Beautiful Hunter (XX 美しき狩人, XX: Utsukushiki karyuudo) is a 1994 Japanese film directed by Masaru Konuma. The film stars Makiko Kuno, Johnny Okura and Kōji Shimizu. The movie was licensed in the US by Central Park Media and was released under their Asia Pulp Cinema label.

== Plot ==
Beautiful as she is deadly, Shion is the most merciless assassin of the Magnificat crime group. But when her hand and heart hesitate to murder the man she loves, her superiors mark her for death! Torn from the crime lords who were her only family, Shion must choose between a life of killing and a life on the run.

== Cast ==
- Makiko Kuno as Shion
- Johnny Okura as Ito
- Koji Shimizu as Father Kano
- Maiko Kazama as Mitsuko
- Katsuo Tokashiki as Man 7
- Kenji Mitamura
- Ryohei Takaoka

=== English Voice Cast ===
The English dub was produced by Matlin Recording in New York City.

- Candi Snackwell as Shion
- Haywood Jab as Ito
- Joseph Stills as Father
- Cariola as Mitsuko
- Tom Wilson as Man 7
- Sonny Dey as Maid
- Yotee

== See also ==
- Naked Killer
