= Naomi Morinaga =

Japanese actress and stuntwoman

- 森永 奈緒美
- Born: Kanagawa Prefecture, Japan
- Occupation: Actress
- Years active: 1981–2014

Naomi Morinaga (森永 奈緒美, Morinaga Naomi in Kanagawa Prefecture) is a former Japanese actress and stuntwoman. She is known for her performance as Annie, the title character's sidekick in the tokusatsu television series Uchuu Keiji Shaider and as Hellen/Hellvira, the protagonist's sister in Jikuu Senshi Spielban. She retired from acting in 1998, but briefly reprised her role as older Annie in the 2014 film Space Sheriff: THE NEXT GENERATION.

== Works ==
=== Film ===
- Space Sheriff Shaider: The Movie (1984), as Annie
- Space Sheriff Shaider: Pursuit! Shigi Shigi Abduction Plan (1984), as Annie
- Hissatsu 4: Urami Harashimasu (Sure-Fire Death 4: We Will Avenge You) (1987)
- Oazuke (1990), as Woman Warrior
- Angel Target (1991)
- Kamen Rider ZO (1993)
- Captive (1994)
- Supernatural Woman Legend Seiraine 4 (1996)
- Space Sheriff: THE NEXT GENERATION (2014)

=== TV ===
- Uchuu Keiji Shaider (Space Sheriff Shaider) (1984–1985), as Annie
- Hissatsu Shigotonin V (1985)
- Jikuu Senshi Spielban (1986–1987), as Helen/Hellvira/Lady Helen
