= Aiko Asano =

Japanese actress and singer (born 1969)

Aiko Asano 浅野 愛子
- Born: 2 March 1969 (age 57); Tokyo, Japan
- Occupations: Actress, singer

Aiko Asano (浅野 愛子, Asano Aiko; born 2 March 1969) is a Japanese actress and singer.

== History ==
She played a lead role in Nobuhiko Obayashi's 1987 Japanese film The Drifting Classroom, which was based on a popular horror manga series The Drifting Classroom by Kazuo Umezu. Her music album Silver Doll and her nude photo book The Younger Sister of Summer were released almost simultaneously with the release of The Drifting Classroom. Those releases led her to considerable fame in Japan in the late 1980s. In 1994, she retired from entertainment industry and got married.

In 2016, Asano did an interview to look back over her experience; she said that her manager wanted her to do the nude photobook The Younger Sister of Summer and she did not really want to do it, but the photographer tried his very best to make her feel more comfortable during the photoshoots; eventually, she became more proud of the nude book The Younger Sister of Summer as she grew older. Aiko Asano also said that she worked very hard to study English for starring in The Drifting Classroom.
