= Japanese Movie Critics Awards =

Film awards presented since 1991

The Japanese Movie Critics Awards (日本映画批評家大賞, Nihon Eiga Hihyōka Taishō) are presented annually since 1991.

As with the New York Film Critics Circle Awards and Los Angeles Film Critics Association Awards, the selection committee consists of film critics.

== Award winners ==
=== 1990s ===
1991 (1st Japanese Movie Critics Awards)

- Best Picture: My Sons (Director: Yoji Yamada)
- Best Director: Naoto Takenaka
- Best Actor: Rentarō Mikuni
- Best Actress: Yuki Kudō
- Best Newcomer: Shinsuke Shimada
- Special Award: Osamu Takizawa (滝沢 一)
- Platinum Award: Keisuke Kinoshita

1992

- Best Picture: Seishun Dendekeke Desdeke
- Best Director: Kaneto Shindo
- Best Actor: Takehiro Murata
- Best Actress: Yoshiko Mita

1993

- Best Picture: To Die at the Hospital
- Best Director: Kōichi Saitō
- Best Actor: Ken Tanaka
- Best Actress: Kyōko Kagawa, Emi Wakui, Junko Ikeuchi

1994

- Best Picture: A Dedicated Life
- Best Director: Tatsumi Kumashiro, Ryūichi Hiroki
- Best Actor: Eiji Okuda
- Best Actress: Tomoko Yamaguchi

1995

- Best Picture: A Last Note
- Best Director: Makoto Shīna
- Best Actor: Eiji Okuda
- Best Actress: Kumiko Akiyoshi

1996

- Best Picture: Village of Dreams
- Best Director: Yoshimitsu Morita
- Best Actor: Kōji Yakusho
- Best Actress: Mieko Harada
- Best Newcomer: Masanobu Andō

1997

- Best Picture: Moonlight Serenade
- Best Director: Masahiro Shinoda
- Best Actor: Akira Emoto
- Best Actress: Kyōka Suzuki

1998

- Best Picture: Kizuna
- Best Director: Takeshi Kitano
- Best Actor: Ken Watanabe
- Best Actress: Takako Matsu

1999

- Best Picture: Coquille
- Best Director: Masahiro Shinoda, Nagisa Oshima
- Best Actor: Tomokazu Miura
- Best Actress: Jun Fubuki, Kyōka Suzuki

=== 2000s ===
2000

- Best Picture: Zawazawa ShimoKitazawa
- Best Director: Ryūichi Hiroki, Kazuo Kuroki
- Best Actor: Yoshio Harada
- Best Actress: Hitomi Kuroki

2001

- Best Picture: Black Summer in Japan: False Charges
- Best Director: Isao Yukisada
- Best Actor: Yōsuke Kubozuka
- Best Actress: Yui Natsukawa
- Best Supporting Actor: Tarō Yamamoto
- Best Supporting Actress: Mitsuko Baisho, Sayoko Ninomiya

2002

- Best Picture: KT
- Best Director: Yoichi Sai
- Best Actor: Kōichi Satō, Masaya Kato
- Best Actress: Rie Miyazawa
- Best Supporting Actor: Ryo Ishibashi
- Best Supporting Actress: Kyōko Kagawa

2003

- Best Picture: Lord of the Warabi
- Best Director: Toyohisa Araki
- Best Actor: Masahiko Tsugawa
- Best Actress: Shinobu Terajima, Yūko Takeuchi
- Best Supporting Actor: Ken Watanabe, Teruyuki Kagawa
- Best Supporting Actress: Hitomi Nakahara

2004

- Best Picture: Swing Girls
- Best Director: Nobuhiko Obayashi
- Best Actor: Ken Matsudaira
- Best Actress: Kumiko Akiyoshi
- Best Supporting Actor: Masaya Takahashi
- Best Supporting Actress: Anna Tsuchiya
- Rookie of the Year: Kamiki Ryunosuke

2005

- Best Picture: Curtain Call
- Best Director: Mitsuo Kurotsuchi
- Best Actor: Kataoka Ainosuke VI, Ichikawa Somegorō VII
- Best Actress: Yūko Tanaka
- Best Supporting Actor: Takashi Sasano, Sansei Shiomi
- Best Supporting Actress: Haruka Igawa

2006

- Best Picture: The Professor's Beloved Equation
- Best Director: Eiji Okuda
- Best Actor: Kenji Sawada
- Best Actress: Eri Fukatsu
- Best Supporting Actor: Tsuyoshi Ihara
- Best Supporting Actress: Kirin Kiki, Hula Girls

2007

- Best Picture: Town of Evening Calm, Country of Cherry Blossoms
- Best Director: Kichitaro Negishi
- Best Actor: Shun Oguri
- Best Actress: Yūko Takeuchi
- Best Supporting Actor: Kyosuke Yabe
- Best Supporting Actress: Hiromi Nagasaku, Keiko Takahashi

2008

- Best Picture: United Red Army
- Best Director: Yōjirō Takita
- Best Actor: Noriyuki Higashiyama
- Best Actress: Eiko Koike
- Best Supporting Actor: Ittoku Kishibe
- Best Supporting Actress: Maki Sakai

2009

- Best Picture: Feel the Wind
- Best Director: Kichitaro Negishi
- Best Actor: Akira Terao
- Best Actress: Hiroko Yakushimaru
- Best Supporting Actor: Renji Ishibashi
- Best Supporting Actress: Kaoru Yachigusa

=== 2010s ===
2010

- Best Picture: Haru's Journey
- Best Director: Yōichi Higashi
- Best Actor: Dai Watanabe, Masatoshi Nagase
- Best Actress: Yuki Uchida, Hiromi Nagasaku
- Best Supporting Actor: Teruyuki Kagawa, Yūsuke Iseya
- Best Supporting Actress: Keiko Matsuzaka

2011

- Best Picture: Someday
- Best Director: Izuru Narushima
- Best Actor: Tomokazu Miura
- Best Actress: Shinobu Otake
- Best Supporting Actor: Kataoka Ainosuke VI
- Best Supporting Actress: Nobuko Miyamoto

2012

- Best Picture: Key of Life
- Best Director: Takeshi Kitano
- Best Animation Feature Film: Wolf Children
- Best Animation Director: Hideaki Anno
- Best Actor: Tori Matsuzaka
- Best Actress: Sakura Ando
- Best Supporting Actor: Takao Osawa
- Best Supporting Actress: Chieko Matsubara

2013

- Best Picture: The Great Passage
- Best Director: Keisuke Yoshida
- Best Animation Feature Film: The Tale of the Princess Kaguya
- Best Animation Director: Isao Takahata
- Best Actor: Ryuhei Matsuda
- Best Actress: Kumiko Asō
- Best Supporting Actor: Lily Franky
- Best Supporting Actress: Ran Ito

2014

- Best Picture: 0.5 mm
- Best Director: Mipo O
- Best Animation Feature Film: Expelled from Paradise
- Best Animation Director: Hiromasa Yonebayashi
- Best Actor: Gō Ayano
- Best Actress: Sakura Ando
- Best Supporting Actor: Masaki Suda
- Best Supporting Actress: Chizuru Ikewaki

2015

- Best Picture: Solomon's Perjury
- Best Director: Hitoshi Ōne
- Best Animation Feature Film: The Boy and the Beast
- Best Animation Director: Masakazu Hashimoto
- Best Actor: Tadanobu Asano
- Best Actress: Mikako Tabe
- Best Supporting Actor: Atsushi Itō
- Best Supporting Actress: Hikari Mitsushima

2016

- Best Picture: Her Love Boils Bathwater
- Best Director: Ryōta Nakano
- Best Animation Feature Film: A Silent Voice
- Best Animation Director: Makoto Shinkai
- Best Actor: Kaoru Kobayashi
- Best Actress: Rie Miyazawa
- Best Supporting Actor: Masahiro Higashide
- Best Supporting Actress: Hana Sugisaki

2017

- Best Picture: The Third Murder
- Best Director: Nobuhiko Obayashi
- Best Animation Feature Film: The Night Is Short, Walk On Girl
- Best Animation Director:
- Best Actor: Takuya Kimura
- Best Actress: Hikari Mitsushima
- Best Supporting Actor: Sansei Shiomi
- Best Supporting Actress: Tae Kimura

2018

- Best Picture: Yakiniku Doragon
- Best Director: Kazuya Shiraishi
- Best Animation Feature Film: Okko's Inn
- Best Animation Director:
- Best Actor: Tasuku Emoto
- Best Actress: Shizuka Ishibashi
- Best Supporting Actor: Kanichiro
- Best Supporting Actress: Tomochika

2019

- Best Picture: Just Only Love
- Best Director: Haruhiko Arai
- Best Animation Feature Film: Sumikko Gurashi The Movie - The Pop-up Book and the Secret Child
- Best Animation Director:
- Best Actor: Shotaro Mamiya
- Best Actress: Erika Toda
- Best Supporting Actor: Yōsuke Kubozuka
- Best Supporting Actress: Sairi Ito

=== 2020s ===
2020

- Best Picture: Child of the Stars
- Best Director: Akiko Oku
- Best Animation Feature Film: Gon, the Little Fox
- Best Animation Director:
- Best Actor: Nakamura Baijaku II, Kanji Tsuda
- Best Actress: Non
- Best Supporting Actor: Shohei Uno
- Best Supporting Actress: Miyoko Asada

2021

- Best Actress: Non (actress), Hold Me Back (original title: Watashi wo kuitomete)
- Best Director: Akiko Ôku (director), Hold Me Back (original title: Watashi wo kuitomete)
- Best New Director: Hikari, 37 Seconds

2022 (The 31st Japanese Movie Critics Awards)

- Best Picture: Wheel of Fortune and Fantasy
- Best Actor: Arata Furuta (Intolerance)
- Best Actress: Kumi Takiuchi (A balance)
- Best Supporting Actor: Ryohei Suzuki (Baragaki:Unbroken Samurai; Last of the Wolves)
- Best Supporting Actress: Tōko Miura (Drive my car)
- Best Director: Keishi Ōtomo (Rurouni Kenshin:The Final; Rurouni Kenshin:The Beginning)
- Best Documentary: Lamafa, the last whale hunters
- Best Animation Feature Film: Hula Fulla Dance
- Best Animation Director: Hideaki Anno (Evangelion 3.0+1.0:Thrice upon a time)
- Best New Director: Mayu Akiyama (Shinonome Color Weekend); Yugo Sakamoto (Baby Assassins); Akio Fujimoto (Along the sea)
- Best New Actor (Toshiko Minami Award): Himi Sato (Moonlight Shadow) ; Fukase (Character)
- Best New Actress (Kazuko Komori Award): Saori Izawa (Baby Assassins) ; Ruka Ishikawa (Colorless) ; Marika Itō (It's a Summer Film) ; Yoko Nishikawa (Itomichi)
- Best Screenplay: Miwa Nishikawa (Under the Open Sky)
- Best Film Editing (Keiichi Uraoka Award): Takahide Hori (Junk Head)
- Best Cinematography: Yoshihiko Ueda (A garden of Camellias)
- Special Award (Takeshi Matsunaga Award): Tomoaki Ogura
- Golden Glory Award (Haruo Mizuno Award): Ichirō Araki
- Diamond Grand Prize: Sumiko Fuji (A garden of Camellias)

2023

- Best Picture: Metamorphose no Engawa
- Animation of the Year: The Tunnel to Summer
- Best Director: Sho Miyake, Small, Slow But Steady
- Best Director (Animation): Masaaki Yuasa, Inu-Oh
- Best Actor: Kiichi Nakai, Dreaming of the Meridian Arc
- Best Actress: Yuka Itaya, Yoake made bus tei de
- Best Documentary: Yumemiru Sho Gakko (directed by Vin Oota)

2024

- Best Picture: Living in Two Worlds
- Animation of the Year: Look Back
- Best Director: Yu Irie, About An
- Best Actor: Ryo Yoshizawa, Living in Two Worlds
- Best Actress: Yuumi Kawai, A Girl Named Ann
- Best Supporting Actor: Ayano Go, Maru
- Best Supporting Actress: Akiko Oshitari, Living in Two Worlds
- Best Documentary: The Big House (directed by Ryo Takebayashi)

2025

- Best Picture: The Two Worlds I Live In
- Best Director: Yu Irie
- Best Actor: Ryo Yoshizawa, The Two Worlds I Live In
- Best Actress: Yuumi Kawai
- Best Supporting Actor: Yusaku Mori, Missing
- Best Supporting Actress: Akiko Oshidari, The Two Worlds I Live In
