= 16th Yokohama Film Festival =

1995 film festival in Yokohama, Japan

- Location: Kannai Hall, Yokohama, Kanagawa, Japan
- Founded: 1980
- Festival date: 22 January 1995

The 16th Yokohama Film Festival (第16回ヨコハマ映画祭) was held on 22 January 1995 in Kannai Hall, Yokohama, Kanagawa, Japan.

== Awards ==
- Best Film: Tokarefu
- Best Film Score: Shigeru Umebayashi – Tokarefu, Ghost Pub
- Best Actor: Eiji Okuda – Like a Rolling Stone
- Best Actress: Saki Takaoka – Crest of Betrayal
- Best Supporting Actor: Kōichi Satō – Tokarefu
- Best Supporting Actress: Shigeru Muroi – Ghost Pub
- Best Director: Junji Sakamoto – Tokarefu
- Best New Director: Takeshi Watanabe – Kyōjū Luger P08
- Best Screenplay: Yōzō Tanaka – Ghost Pub, Natsu no Niwa: The Friends
- Best Cinematography: Norimichi Kasamatsu – Alone in the Night, Angel Guts: Red Lightning, Angel Dust
- Best New Talent:
  - Shunsuke Matsuoka – 800 Two Lap Runners
  - Hinako Saeki – It's a Summer Vacation Everyday
  - Yui Natsukawa – Alone in the Night
- Special Prize: Azuma Morisaki – For his work.

== Best 10 ==
1. Tokarefu
2. Ghost Pub
3. Crest of Betrayal
4. 800 Two Lap Runners
5. Like a Rolling Stone
6. 119
7. A Night in Nude
8. Natsu no Niwa: The Friends
9. A Dedicated Life
10. Alone in the Night

runner-up: Kyōjū Luger P08
