= Mainichi Film Award for Best Film =

Mainichi Awards for Best Japanese Film

- Awarded for: Best Film of the year
- Country: Japan
- First award: 1946
- Website: Official website

A list of the winners of the Award for Best Film at the Mainichi Film Award.

Year	Film	Director
1946	Aru yo no Tonosama	Teinosuke Kinugasa
1947	Ima Hitotabi no	Heinosuke Gosho
1948	Drunken Angel	Akira Kurosawa
1949	Late Spring	Yasujirō Ozu
1950	Until We Meet Again	Tadashi Imai
1951	Repast	Mikio Naruse
1952	Ikiru	Akira Kurosawa
1953	An Inlet of Muddy Water	Tadashi Imai
1954	Twenty-Four Eyes	Keisuke Kinoshita
1955	Floating Clouds	Mikio Naruse
1956	Mahiru no ankoku	Tadashi Imai
1957	The Rice People	Tadashi Imai
1958	The Ballad of Narayama	Keisuke Kinoshita
1959	Kiku to Isamu	Tadashi Imai
1960	Her Brother	Kon Ichikawa
1961	A Soldier's Prayer	Masaki Kobayashi
1962	Harakiri	Masaki Kobayashi
1963	High and Low	Akira Kurosawa
1964	Woman in the Dunes	Hiroshi Teshigahara
1965	Red Beard	Akira Kurosawa
1966	Shiroi Kyotou	Satsuo Yamamoto
1967	Samurai Rebellion	Masaki Kobayashi
1968	The Profound Desire of the Gods	Shōhei Imamura
1969	Double Suicide	Masahiro Shinoda
1970	Kazoku	Yoji Yamada
1971	Silence	Masahiro Shinoda
1972	Shinobu Kawa	Kei Kumai
1973	Tsugaru Jongarabushi	Kōichi Saitō
1974	Castle of Sand	Yoshitarō Nomura
1975	The Fossil	Masaki Kobayashi
1976	Fumou Chitai	Satsuo Yamamoto
1977	The Yellow Handkerchief	Yoji Yamada
1978	The Incident	Yoshitarō Nomura
1979	Nomugi Pass	Satsuo Yamamoto
1980	Kagemusha	Akira Kurosawa
1981	Muddy River	Kōhei Oguri
1982	Fall Guy	Kinji Fukasaku
1983	Merry Christmas, Mr. Lawrence	Nagisa Oshima
1984	W's Tragedy	Shinichiro Sawai
1985	Ran	Akira Kurosawa
1986	The Sea and Poison	Kei Kumai
1987	A Taxing Woman	Juzo Itami
1988	My Neighbor Totoro	Hayao Miyazaki
1989	Black Rain	Shōhei Imamura
1990	Childhood Days	Masahiro Shinoda
1991	My Sons	Yoji Yamada
1992	Sumo Do, Sumo Don't	Masayuki Suo
1993	All Under the Moon	Yoichi Sai
1994	A Dedicated Life	Kazuo Hara
1995	A Last Note	Kaneto Shindo
1996	Shall We Dance?	Masayuki Suo
1997	Princess Mononoke	Hayao Miyazaki
1998	Begging for Love	Hideyuki Hirayama
1999	Poppoya	Yasuo Furuhata
2000	Face	Junji Sakamoto
2001	Spirited Away	Hayao Miyazaki
2002	The Twilight Samurai	Yoji Yamada
2003	Akame 48 Waterfalls	Genjiro Arato
2004	Blood and Bones	Yoichi Sai
2005	Pacchigi!	Kazuyuki Izutsu
2006	Sway	Miwa Nishikawa
2007	I Just Didn't Do It	Masayuki Suo
2008	Departures	Yōjirō Takita
2009	Shizumanu Taiyō	Setsurō Wakamatsu
2010	Villain	Lee Sang-il
2011	Postcard	Kaneto Shindo
2012	A Terminal Trust	Masayuki Suo
2013	The Great Passage	Yuya Ishii
2014	My Man	Kazuyoshi Kumakiri
2015	Three Stories of Love	Ryōsuke Hashiguchi
2016	Shin Godzilla	Hideaki Anno and Shinji Higuchi
2017	Hanagatami	Nobuhiko Obayashi
2018	Shoplifters	Hirokazu Kore-eda
2019	Listen to the Universe	Kei Ishikawa
2020	Mother	Tatsushi Ōmori
2021	Drive My Car	Ryusuke Hamaguchi
2022	Small, Slow But Steady	Shō Miyake
2023	Okiku and the World	Junji Sakamoto
2024	All the Long Nights	Shō Miyake
2025	Teki Cometh	Daihachi Yoshida
