= Haruhiko Arai =

Japanese screenwriter

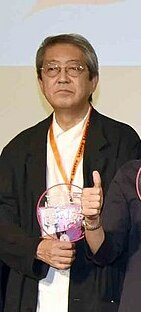
- Born: 1947 (age 78–79)
- Occupations: Screenwriter; Film director

Haruhiko Arai (荒井 晴彦, Arai Haruhiko; born 1947) is a Japanese screenwriter and film director. He is also a publisher and an editor of the Eiga Geijutsu magazine and a professor of the Japan Institute of the Moving Image.

== Career ==
Arai won the Mainichi Film Award for best screenplay for the film W's Tragedy in 1984. He wrote the screenplay for Junji Sakamoto's KT (2001), and also penned the screenplays for Ryuichi Hiroki's films Vibrator (2003) and It's Only Talk (2005). In 2013, he wrote the scripts for Junichi Inoue's A Woman and War and Shinji Aoyama's The Backwater.

His published but unfilmed scenario, Divine Comedy (神聖喜劇, Shinsei kigeki), has been called lesescenario by figures such as the director Shinichiro Sawai.

== Filmography ==
=== As screenwriter ===
- The Woman with Red Hair (1979)
- Enrai (1981)
- Time and Tide (1983)
- W's Tragedy (1984)
- The City That Never Sleeps: Shinjuku Shark (1993)
- Body and Soul (1997)
- KT (2002)
- Vibrator (2003)
- It's Only Talk (2005)
- Someday (2011)
- A Woman and War (2013)
- The Backwater (2013)
- Unlucky Woman's Blues (2014)
- Kabukicho Love Hotel (2014)
- September 1923 (2023)

=== As director ===
- Body and Soul (1997)
- It Feels So Good (2020)
- A Spoiling Rain (2023)
- The Stars and Moon are Holes in the Sky (2025)

== Bibliography ==
- Arai, Haruhiko (2004). Shinario shinsei kigeki. Tokyo: Ōta Shuppan. ISBN 9784872339024.

== See also ==
- Kazuo Kasahara
