= 45th Yokohama Film Festival =

2024 film festival in Yokohama, Japan

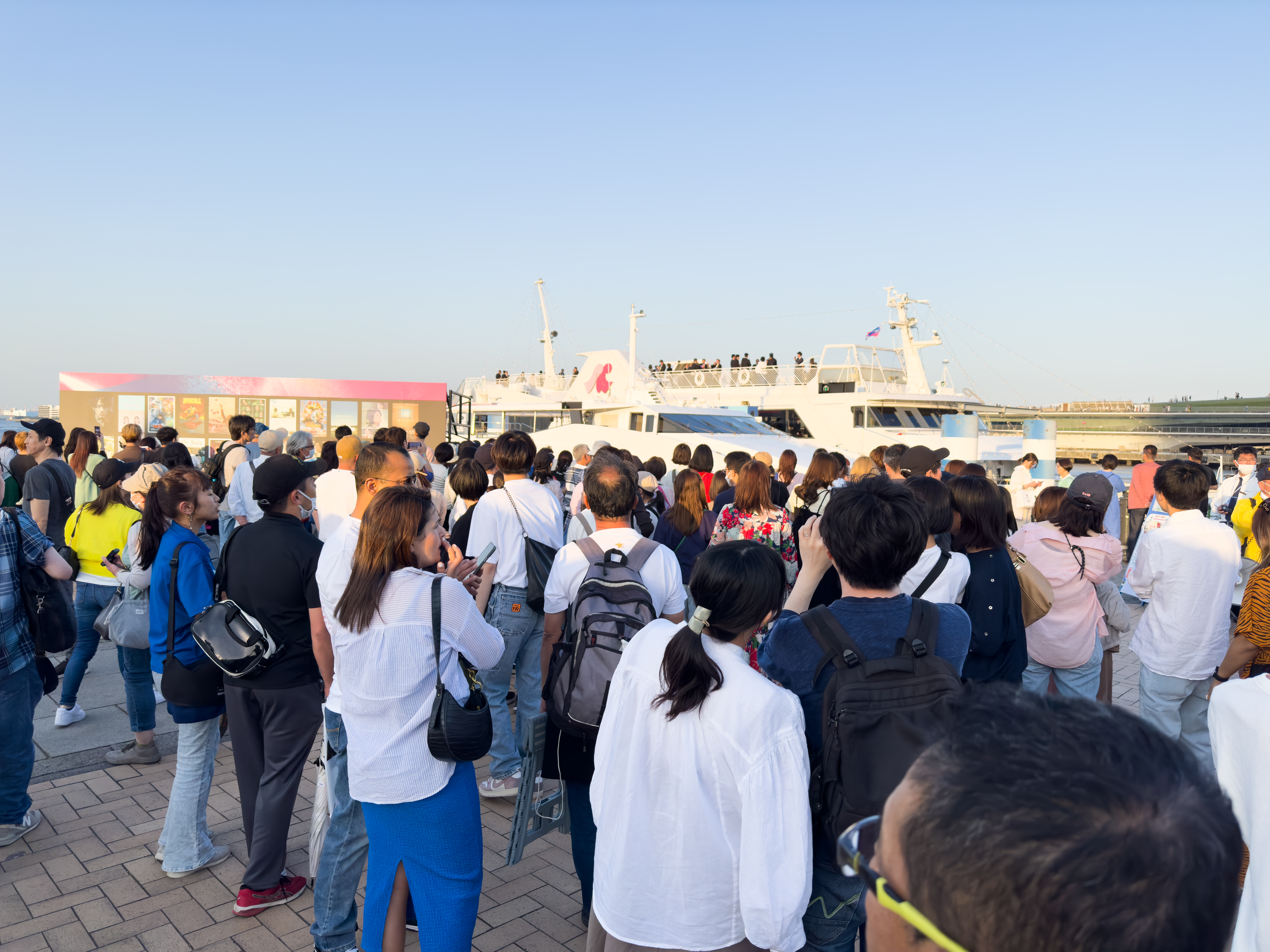
- Location: Yokohama, Kanagawa, Japan
- Founded: 1980
- Festival date: 4 February 2024

The 45th Yokohama Film Festival (第45回ヨコハマ映画祭) was held on 4 February 2024. The awards were announced on 11 December 2023.

== Awards ==
- Best Film: - Small, Slow But Steady
- Best Director: Yuya Ishii - Masked Hearts, The Moon
- Yoshimitsu Morita Memorial Best New Director: Takuya Katō - Fly On
- Best Screenplay: Atsushi Asada - I Am What I Am
- Best Cinematographer: Yūta Tsukinaga - Small, Slow But Steady
- Best Art Direction: Mitsuo Harada - Okiku and the World
- Best Actress:
  - Yukino Kishii - Small, Slow But Steady
  - Haru Kuroki - Okiku and the World
- Best Actor: Ryohei Suzuki - Egoist, Tokyo MER: Mobile Emergency Room – The Movie
- Best Supporting Actress: Kumi Nakamura - Takano Tofu, Undercurrent
- Best Supporting Actor:
  - Hayato Isomura - (Ab)normal Desire, The Moon, Ripples, The Dry Spell, Hard Days
  - Kōichi Satō - Okiku and the World, Masked Hearts, Familia, Baian the Assassin, M.D. Part 2 and others
- Best Newcomer:
  - Mayu Hotta - Tsugaru Lacquer Girl
  - Ren Meguro - As Long as We Both Shall Live, Phases of the Moon
- Examiner Special Award: Shin'ichro Matsuura and the boxing movies involving him
- Special Grand Prize: Tatsuya Fuji

== Top 10 ==
No.	Title
1	Small, Slow But Steady
2	Okiku and the World
3	September 1923
4	Masked Hearts
5	(Ab)normal Desire
6	The Moon
7	A Spoiling Rain
8	Undercurrent
9	Picture of Spring
10	Fly On
Runner-up: Godzilla Minus One
