= Naomi Fujiyama =

Japanese actress

- Born: December 28, 1958 (age 67); Osaka, Japan
- Occupation: Actress
- Years active: 1962–present
- Parent: Kanbi Fujiyama (father)

Naomi Fujiyama (藤山 直美, Fujiyama Naomi; born December 28, 1958) is a Japanese actress. She won the award for best actress at the 25th Hochi Film Award and at the 22nd Yokohama Film Festival for Face.

She is the daughter of leading Japanese comedian Kanbi Fujiyama.

== Filmography ==
=== Film ===
- Zatoichi and the Chess Expert (1965)
- Face (2000)
- Godzilla Against Mechagodzilla (2002)
- Get Up! (2003)
- Three for the Road (2007)
- Danchi (2016)

=== Television ===
- Hissatsu Watashinin (1983)
- Imo Tako Nankin (2006–07)

== Honours ==
- Medal with Purple Ribbon (2020)
- Osaka Culture Prize Cultural Transmission Prize (2007)
