= Fusako Kuramochi =

Japanese shōjo manga artist

Fusako Kuramochi (くらもち ふさこ, Kuramochi Fusako; real name 倉持房子 Kuramochi Fusako, born 14 May 1955 in Shibuya, Tokyo) is a Japanese shōjo manga artist. While still in high school, she made her professional debut with Megane-chan no Hitorigoto, published in the Autumn 1972 issue of Bessatsu Margaret. She won the magazine's gold medal for amateur manga artists. Afterwards, Kuramochi studied Japanese painting at Musashino Art University, but left before graduation to pursue her career full-time.

Her manga Tennen Kokekkō received the 1996 Kodansha Manga Award for shōjo manga, and was adapted as a live-action movie in 2007. Her series A-Girl was adapted as an anime OVA in 1993. Her manga Hana ni Somu won the Grand Prize category of the 21st Tezuka Osamu Cultural Prize in 2017.
