= Etsushi Toyokawa =

Japanese actor (born 1962)

- 豊川 悦司
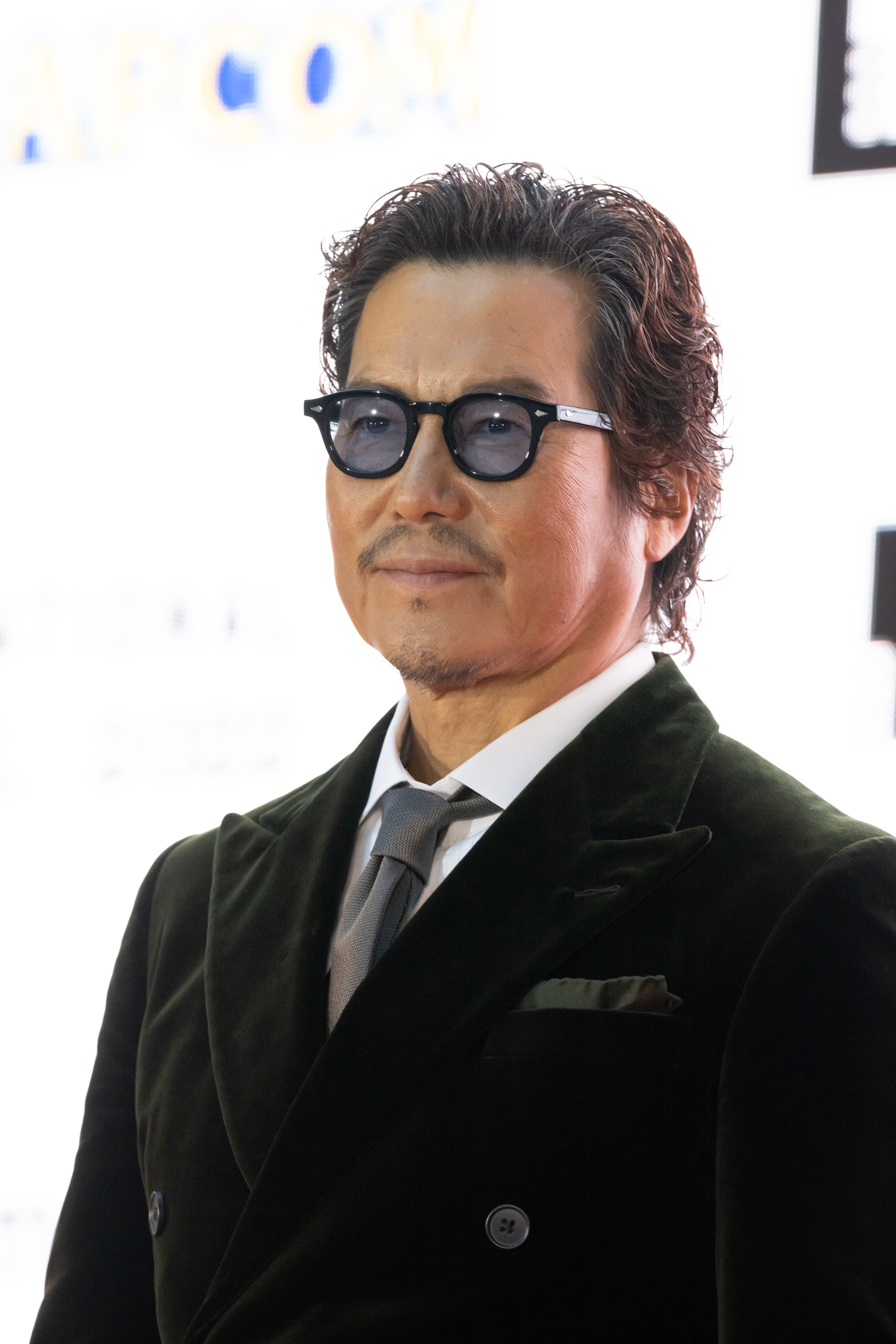
- Toyokawa in 2022
- Born: March 18, 1962 (age 64); Yao, Osaka, Japan
- Occupation: Actor
- Years active: 1989–present

Etsushi Toyokawa (Japanese: 豊川 悦司, Hepburn: Toyokawa Etsushi; born March 18, 1962) is a Japanese actor.

== Biography ==
Born in Yao, Osaka, he studied at Shimizudani High School, and eventually dropped out of Kwansei Gakuin University to pursue a career in acting. He began by joining the sho-gekijo theatrical troupe "Under Thirty," which was known for the membership of another famous actor, Watanabe Eriko, at the time. Though like many new theatre actors at the time, he struggled to make ends meet until he got his first big break in 1992, in the television drama Night Head alongside Shinji Takeda, as one of two brothers with supernatural powers.

In 1993 he won the "Newcomer of the Year" award for his drama Kira Kira Hikaru, and the Popularity Award in 1996 for his work in the drama Love Letter.

He also won the Japanese Academy Award as best supporting actor three times, the Hochi Film Award for Love Letter, No Way Back and Hanako.

== Selected filmography ==
=== Film ===
Year	Film	Role	Notes	Ref.
1989	Kimi wa Boku wo Suki ni Naru			
1990	Boiling Point	Okinawa-Rengou Kumichou		
1990	Byouin e Ikou			
1991	The Gentle 12	Juror 11		
1992	Kira Kira Hikaru	Mutsuki Kishida		
1993	Tsuribaka Nisshi 6			
1994	Angel Dust	Tomoo Suma		
1994	Undo	Yukio		
1994	Night Head	Naoto Kirihara	Leading role	
1994	Ghost Pub	Nobuya Sugimoto		
1995	Love Letter	Shigeru Akiba		
1995	No Way Back	Yuji Kobayashi	American film	
1995	School Mystery	Yuji Sakamoto	Also known as Phantom of the Toilet	
1996	Yatsuhaka-Mura	Kosuke Kindaichi	Leading role	
1997	Kizu Darake no Tenshi	Mitsuru Kida	Leading role	
1997	Lie Lie Lie	Makoto Aikawa		
2000	Face	Hiroyuki Nakagami		
2000	Zawazawa Shimokitazawa			
2000	New Battles Without Honor and Humanity	Kadoya Kaneo		
2002	Inochi	Yutaka Higashi		
2002	Dog Star	Shiro		
2003	Moon Child	vampire Luca		
2004	Tange Sazen	Tange Sazen	Leading role	
2004	Lakeside Murder Case	Masaru Tsukumi		
2005	The Man Behind the Scissors	Yasunaga		
2005	Year One in the North	Ashirika		
2005	The Great Yokai War	Yasunori Katō		
2005	Loft	Makoto Yoshioka		
2006	Hula Girls	Yojiro Tanikawa		
2006	Nihon Chinbotsu	Yusuke Tadokoro		
2007	Tsubaki Sanjuro	Hanbei Muroto	Remake of the Kurosawa film	
2007	The Kiss	Akio Sakaguchi		
2007	Southbound	Ichiro Uehara	Leading role	
2007	The Investigation Game	Fumihiko Makishima	Leading role	
2008	10 Promises to My Dog	Yuichi Saito		
2008	Teacher and Three Children	Yoshihito Yamazaki		
2008	20th Century Boys: Beginning of the End	Otcho		
2009	20th Century Boys 2: The Last Hope	Otcho		
2009	20th Century Boys 3: Redemption	Otcho		
2010	Sword of Desperation	Kanemi Sanzaemon	Leading role	
2010	A Good Husband	Shunsuke Kitami	Leading role	
2010	Postcard	Keita Matsuyama	Leading role	
2013	Platinum Data	Reiji Asama		
2013	Human Trust	Harry Endo		
2014	Judge!	Ichirō Ōtaki		
2014	Climbing to Spring	Goro Tada		
2014	Her Granddaughter	Jun Kaieda	Leading role	
2016	Black Widow Business	Tōru Kashiwagi		
2017	March Comes in Like a Lion	Kōda		
2017	March Goes out Like a Lamb	Kōda		
2017	The Blue Hearts	Tatsuya Akiyama		
2018	Flea-picking Samurai	Senbē		
2018	Laplace's Witch	Amakasu		
2018	Punk Samurai Slash Down	Naitō Tatewaki		
2019	Paradise Next	Shima	Leading role, Taiwanese-Japanese film	
2019	Midway	Admiral Isoroku Yamamoto	American film	
2019	Samurai Marathon	Ioki Suketora		
2020	Last Letter	Atō		
2021	Ito	Kōichi Sōma		
2021	One Summer Story	Tomomitsu Waragai		
2021	I Never Shot Anyone	Atō		
2021	Every Trick in the Book	Kenjirō Kurata		
2022	My Brother, The Android and Me	Kaoru Kiryu	Leading role	
2022	Kingdom 2: Far and Away	Biao Gong		
2022	2 Women	Atsurō Shiraki	Leading role	
2023	Baian the Assassin, M.D.	Fujieda Baian	Leading role	
2023	Baian the Assassin, M.D. 2	Fujieda Baian	Leading role	
2023	And So I'm at a Loss	Kōji		
2023	Revolver Lily	Kinya Hosomi		
2026	Kingdom 5: The Clash of Souls	Biao Gong		

=== Television ===
Year	Title	Role	Notes	Ref.
1991	Taiheiki	Kichiji	Taiga drama	
1993	Homura Tatsu	Kiyohara no Iehira	Taiga drama	
1995	Tell Me That You Love Me	Koji Sakaki	Leading role	
1997	Aoi Tori	Yoshimori Shibata	Leading role	
2006	Bengoshi no Kuzu	Kuzu Motohito	Leading role	
2011	Go	Oda Nobunaga	Taiga drama	
2012	Beautiful Rain	Keisuke Kinoshita	Leading role	
2018	Half Blue Sky	Haori Akikaze	Asadora	
2020	Earwig and the Witch	Mandrake (voice)	TV movie	
2020	The Fugitive	Masami Hosaka	Mini-series	
2021–24	No Activity	Shingo Tokita	Leading role; 2 seasons	
2024–27	Tokyo Swindlers	Harrison Yamanaka	Leading role; 2 seasons	

== Video games ==
- Lost Odyssey (2008)
