= Hayabusa: Harukanaru Kikan =

- Directed by: Tokiyuki Takimoto
- Starring: Ken Watanabe; Yōsuke Eguchi; Yui Natsukawa; Yukiyoshi Ozawa; Tatsuya Fuji; Tsutomu Yamazaki
- Production companies: 20th Century Fox Japan; Dentsu
- Distributed by: 20th Century Fox International
- Release date: February 11, 2012 (Japan)
- Running time: 136 minutes
- Country: Japan
- Language: Japanese

Hayabusa: Harukanaru Kikan (はやぶさ 遥かなる帰還) is a 2012 Japanese drama film directed by Tokiyuki Takimoto based on the story of the Hayabusa asteroid probe, which collected samples from the asteroid Itokawa in 2005 and returned them to Earth in 2010.

Two other films made on the same subject were Hayabusa (2011) and Welcome Home, Hayabusa (2012). Hayabusa: The Long Voyage Home emphasized the role of the people on the ground as they helped return the probe.

== Cast ==
- Ken Watanabe
- Yōsuke Eguchi
- Yui Natsukawa
- Yukiyoshi Ozawa
- Ricco Ross
- Tatsuya Fuji
- Tsutomu Yamazaki

== See also ==
- Hayabusa spacecraft
