= Human Trust =

- Film poster

Japanese name
- Kanji: 人類資金
- Directed by: Junji Sakamoto
- Written by: Junji Sakamoto; Harutoshi Fukui
- Produced by: Yukiko Shii
- Starring: Kōichi Satō; Mirai Moriyama; Alisa Mizuki; Shingo Katori; Yoo Ji-tae; Vincent Gallo; Tatsuya Nakadai
- Cinematography: Norimichi Kasamatsu
- Edited by: Ryo Hayano
- Music by: Goro Yasukawa
- Production company: Kino Films
- Distributed by: Shochiku
- Release date: October 19, 2013 (Japan)
- Running time: 140 minutes
- Country: Japan
- Languages: Japanese; English; Russian; Thai
- Box office: $3,547,836

Human Trust (Japanese: 人類資金, Hepburn: Jinrui Shikin) is a 2013 Japanese suspense film directed by Junji Sakamoto, starring Kōichi Satō, Mirai Moriyama, Alisa Mizuki, Shingo Katori, Yoo Ji-tae, Vincent Gallo, and Tatsuya Nakadai. It was filmed in Japan, Russia, Thailand, and the United States.

== Plot ==
In 2014, Yuichi Mafune (Kōichi Satō), a confidence man, is hired by "M" (Shingo Katori) to steal 10 trillion yen from the M Fund and use it for humanitarian assistance to the Third World. Harold Marcus (Vincent Gallo), an investment banker, sends Osamu Endo (Yoo Ji-tae), an assassin, to stop them.

== Cast ==
- Kōichi Satō as Yuichi Mafune
- Mirai Moriyama as Seki Yukit
- Alisa Mizuki as Miyuki Takato
- Shingo Katori as Nobuto "M" Sasakura
- Tatsuya Nakadai as Nobuhiko Sasakura
- Vincent Gallo as Harold Marcus
- Yoo Ji-tae as Osamu Endo
- Etsushi Toyokawa as Harry Endo
- Ittoku Kishibe as Kazuyoshi Honjo
- Joe Odagiri as Eiji Kugenuma
- Susumu Terajima as Tadashi Sakata
- Renji Ishibashi as Detective Kitamura

== Reception ==
Elizabeth Kerr of The Hollywood Reporter gave the film a mixed review, saying: "Technically the film is competent if unremarkable and the (occasionally wooden) cast does what it can with the material, which forces them all to swing wildly between melodramatic thriller mode and standard action hero antics". Meanwhile, Mark Schilling of The Japan Times gave it 2 out of 5 stars, saying: "Even stranger is the climax, which features a lengthy speech that makes Charlie Chaplin's famous peroration in The Great Dictator seem like a model of compression and restraint. Chaplin at least had the excuse of railing against Nazism. Sakamoto and Fukui are simply guilty of equating real-world politics with high school speech contests."
