= Lie Lie Lie (film) =

- Film poster
- Directed by: Shun Nakahara
- Screenplay by: Aki Itami; Manabu Saruwata
- Based on: Eien mo nakaba o sugite by Ramo Nakajima
- Produced by: Hiroshi Fujikura; Makoto Ishikawa; Kosaburo Sasaoka; Takashige Ichise
- Starring: Etsushi Toyokawa; Honami Suzuki; Kōichi Satō; Hirotarō Honda; Miwako Kawai
- Cinematography: Junichi Fujisawa
- Edited by: Isao Tomita
- Music by: Ryo Yoshimata
- Production companies: Toei Company; Pony Canyon; Hakuhodo
- Distributed by: Toei Company
- Release date: October 4, 1997 (Japan)
- Running time: 123 minutes
- Country: Japan
- Language: Japanese

Lie Lie Lie, also stylized as Lie lie Lie, is a 1997 Japanese comedy drama crime film directed by Shun Nakahara and written by Aki Itami and Manabu Saruwata (the latter a joint pen name for Nakahara, Naoya Narita and Kosaburo Sasaoka). It is based upon the novel Eien mo nakaba o sugite (lit. Halfway through Eternity) by Ramo Nakajima. It stars Etsushi Toyokawa, Honami Suzuki and Kōichi Satō as a trio of con artists. Ryo Yoshimata composed the film's score, while its self-titled theme song was written and performed by Bonnie Pink. Lie Lie Lie was theatrically released by Toei Company on October 4, 1997, in Japan.

== Plot ==
Zeiji Hatano is a freelance computer typesetter who lives alone and suffers from insomnia. He spends his days silently typing in an undistinguished office. One day, Makoto Aikawa, a former high school classmate he has not seen in ten years, shows up on his doorstep with a bag of clams. He claims to be the CEO of a trading company, and that the clams are a rare species of shellfish. However, Aikawa is soon sleeping on Hatano's couch. In fact, Aikawa is a seasoned con artist. He went on the run to Hokkaido after swindling a large sum of money with his friend and partner Yocchan. Aikawa then had an affair with and borrowed money from Kiki, daughter of Ta, the head of the Senzu-gumi gang. With Kiki's father threatening him, Aikawa has run away once again.

Aikawa offers Hatano sleeping pills for his insomnia, which he takes. However, the sleeping pills produce a strange side effect. Hatano becomes manic and, in an unconscious state, writes an entire manuscript. This gives Aikawa an idea for a new scam, slowly dragging Hatano into his con artist lifestyle. Aikawa, who has heard about a competition for publisher Mitani, pitches himself as a bookbinder and, with his skills of persuasion, secures an order with the company. Then, when presenting the manuscript to Mitani, he pretends it was "written by a ghost from abroad". Misaki Ui, the female editor handling the transaction, admires the manuscript's contents, but sees through Aikawa's charm. However, tired of her work, her company, and the advances of her illicit boss, and drawn to Hatano, Misaki agrees to the publication on the condition that she be allowed to join the scam.

Misaki intentionally inflates the number of copies printed for the first edition to inflict a financial blow on her boss and the company, but the book ends up selling in large quantities. The publication is a great success, even resulting in a television debate with literary scholar Hirazawa. Aikawa plans to keep giving Hatano sleeping pills so he can write sequels. However, at a party celebrating the book's success, Kiki and Ta show up and confront Aikawa. Misaki persuades Kiki to let him go. Afterwards, Hatano realizes that he has feelings for Misaki.

A few days later, Aikawa leaves once again. Hatano, who is no longer typing unconsciously, confesses his feelings to Misaki through a typesetter. Just as Misaki replies that she feels the same, Aikawa returns with yet another idea for a scam.

== Cast ==
- Etsushi Toyokawa as Makoto Aikawa
- Honami Suzuki as Misaki Ui
- Kōichi Satō as Zeiji Hatano
- Hirotarō Honda as Deputy Director Kaito
- Miwako Kawai as Kiki Sendo
- Akaji Maro as Den
- Tatsuo Matsumura as Seiichiro Hirasawa
- Umejaku Nakamura as Mitani
- Miki Sanjō as Mrs. Hirasawa
- Koichi Ueda as Yocchan
- Yuji Kotari as Party Guest
- Ryuji Yamamoto as Party Guest
- Tomorowo Taguchi as Party Guest
- Kazuyuki Aijima
- Masahiro Komoto

== Soundtrack ==
The film's score was composed by Ryo Yoshimata. Its self-titled theme song, "Lie Lie Lie", was written and performed by Bonnie Pink. The song had been included on Pink's second album, released earlier the same year by Pony Canyon. It eventually became the album's fourth single, released a day ahead of the film's premiere. The film's end credits song, "Tatoeba no Hanashi", was also performed by Pink.

== Release ==
Lie Lie Lie was theatrically released by Toei Company on October 4, 1997, in Japan.
