= Zatoichi: The Last =

2010 film by Junji Sakamoto

- Theatrical release poster
- Directed by: Junji Sakamoto
- Written by: Kikumi Yamagishi
- Based on: "Zatoichi Monogatari" by Kan Shimozawa
- Produced by: Chihiro Kameyama
- Starring: Shingo Katori
- Cinematography: Norimichi Kasamatsu
- Edited by: Tomoko Hiruta
- Music by: Project Wago
- Production company: Sedic International
- Distributed by: Toho
- Release date: May 29, 2010 (Japan)
- Running time: 132 minutes
- Country: Japan
- Language: Japanese

Zatoichi: The Last (Japanese: 座頭市 THE LAST, Hepburn: Zatōichi Za Rasuto) is a 2010 samurai film directed by Junji Sakamoto and starring Shingo Katori in the role of Zatoichi.

== Plot ==
The film starts with young Ichi's wife (Satomi Ishihara) being accidentally killed by Toraji (Sosuke Takaoka), the cowardly art-loving son of a yakuza boss. Following her death, Zatoichi (Shingo Katori) returns to his hometown where he hopes to resume a normal life under the guise of farming with his friend Ryuji (Takashi Sorimachi). Unfortunately, the same group of yakuza plans to change Zatoichi's hometown into a harbor and begin exploiting local peasants for money. Ryuji's land deeds are taken and ransomed at a high price, so Zatoichi uses his gambling skills to win money for the deeds. This unveils his identity, so the yakuza burn down his house. The villagers draft a Tanran scroll to present to a passing official asking for assistance. Having Zatoichi in the village would not work in their favor, however, so the villagers devise a plan to dispose of him. They give him a blank scroll to "deliver" to the officials and lead him on a dangerous path into the yakuza. He eventually realizes it is the wrong path and makes it to the officials. The betrayal is revealed when he shows the blank scroll to the officials, who are insulted and subsequently leave. Zatoichi takes responsibility for getting rid of the yakuza onto himself, so he goes to the yakuza headquarters and kills the boss. In the end, he is shot by Toraji and stabbed by one of the yakuza minions. Crawling on hands and feet, he goes to the beach where he presumably dies and reunites with his wife in the next life.

== Cast ==
- Shingo Katori as Zatoichi
- Satomi Ishihara as Tane
- Takashi Sorimachi as Ryuji
- Chieko Baisho as Mitsu
- Seishiro Kato as Goro
- Tatsuya Nakadai as Tendo
- Sosuke Takaoka as Toraji
- Susumu Terajima as Tatsuji
- Youki Kudoh as Toyo
- Arata Iura as Juzo
- Kosuke Toyohara as Sen
- Nakamura Kanzaburō XVIII as Masakichi
- Yoshio Harada as Genkichi
- Zeebra as Yasuke
- Koichi Iwaki as Shimaji
- Takashi Ukaji as Kajiwara
- Toshio Shiba as Kitagawa

== Reception ==
Mark Schilling of The Japan Times criticized Zatoichi: The Last, noting that the film is "ultimately chanbara (sword-fighting) entertainment, similar to The Dark Knight and other Hollywood comic book movies that try for darkness and depth but still have CG action at their center."
