= Children of the Dark =

- Film poster
- 闇の子供たち
- Directed by: Junji Sakamoto
- Written by: Junji Sakamoto
- Based on: Yami no Kodomotachi by Yang Sok-il
- Produced by: Yukiko Shiii
- Starring: Yōsuke Eguchi; Aoi Miyazaki; Satoshi Tsumabuki; Kōichi Satō
- Cinematography: Norimichi Kasamatsu
- Edited by: Tomoko Hiruta
- Music by: Taro Iwashiro
- Distributed by: Go Cinema
- Release date: August 2, 2008 (Japan)
- Running time: 138 minutes
- Country: Japan
- Language: Japanese

Children of the Dark (Japanese: 闇の子供たち, Hepburn: Yami no Kodomotachi), also known as Children of Darkness, is a 2008 Japanese crime film written and directed by Junji Sakamoto based upon the book by the same name by Yang Sok-il. The film premiered on August 2, 2008 in Japan and stars Yōsuke Eguchi, Aoi Miyazaki and Satoshi Tsumabuki. Due to its content, Bangkok International Film Festival pulled Children of the Dark from its 2008 film lineup, stating that it was “not appropriate for Thai society.”

== Cast ==
- Yōsuke Eguchi as Hiroyuki Nanbu
- Aoi Miyazaki as Keiko Otowa
- Satoshi Tsumabuki as Hiroaki Yoda
- Kōichi Satō as Katsuhito Kajikawa
- Sawa Suzuki as Mineko Kajikawa
- Kosuke Toyohara as Tetsuo Shimizu
- Prima Ratchata as Napapom
- Setanan Homyamyen as Aranya
- Thanayong Wongtrakun

== Production ==
Filming for Children of the Dark took place in Bangkok despite initial problems securing a filming permit for Thailand, who denied Sakamoto's attempts to procure one. Actor Yōsuke Eguchi had some difficulties with the script, as he did not speak Thai and did not have enough time to learn beyond a few basic words in the language. As a result, Eguchi had to learn the script phonetically, and he wrote the each script line's pronunciation in katakana before memorizing the lines. After completing the film, Eguchi stated that he began to see things "deeper", as he "saw slums nestled among high-rise buildings in Bangkok, where wealth exists alongside the poor and vulnerable."

Children of the Dark was initially accepted into the Bangkok International Film Festival, who intended to show the film at their 2008 festival, only for festival sponsors Tourism Authority of Thailand and the Federation of National Film Association to pull the film after learning of the movie's content. Sakamoto offered to edit the film in order for it to be shown, only for the festival programmers to decline as they wanted the movie to remain uncut.

== Reception ==
The Japan Times gave the film three out of five stars, questioning Sakamoto's decision to insert a twist in the film's ending as they felt that it was the "one false note in Sakamoto’s strongest, bravest and most debate-worthy film in years." Richard Kuipers of Variety gave Children of the Dark a positive review, and described it as "a compelling, disturbing thriller set in the twilight world of child prostitution in Thailand."
