= Tekken (disambiguation) =

Tekken is a series of fighting video games produced by Namco.

Tekken may also refer to:

- Tekken (video game), the first game in the series
  - Tekken 2
  - Tekken 3
  - Tekken Tag Tournament
  - Tekken 4
  - Tekken 5
  - Tekken 6
  - Tekken Tag Tournament 2
  - Tekken 7
  - Tekken 8
  - Tekken: The Motion Picture, a 1998 animated film based on the series
  - Tekken (2009 film), a live-action film based on the series
  - Tekken: Blood Vengeance, a 2011 animated film based on the series
  - Tekken Mobile, a mobile game
- Tekken (1990 film), a Japanese film by Junji Sakamoto
