= Tekken (1990 film) =

1990 Japanese film

- Film poster
- Directed by: Junji Sakamoto
- Written by: Junji Sakamoto
- Produced by: Michio Akiyama; Genjiro Arato; Kaho Song
- Starring: Takeshi Yamato; Bunta Sugawara; Karen Kirishima; Yoshio Harada; Toshiya Fujita
- Cinematography: Norimichi Kasamatsu
- Music by: Shigeru Umebayashi
- Release date: November 23, 1990 (Japan)
- Running time: 128 minutes
- Country: Japan
- Language: Japanese

Tekken (Japanese: 鉄拳) is a 1990 Japanese film directed by Junji Sakamoto. It stars Takeshi Yamato, Bunta Sugawara and Karen Kirishima.

== Plot ==
The plot centers around a young ex-prisoner who takes up boxing (tekken is Japanese for "clenched fist").

== Cast ==
- Takeshi Yamato as Akio Gotoh
- Bunta Sugawara as Seiji Nakamoto
- Karen Kirishima as Akio's Girlfriend
- Yoshio Harada
- Toshiya Fujita
- Masakatsu Funaki
- Masato Hagiwara
- Hajime Hana
- Kikuko Hashimoto
- Shinbō Minami
- Hitoshi Nonomura
- Masakazu Serizawa
- Yuichiro Shiga
- Shiza Takeshi
- Keisuke Tsuchiya
- Yoko Ueno
- Ryuji Yamamoto
- Michiyo Yasuda
- Takashi Sakamoto

== Awards ==
Bunta Sugawara won a Hochi Film Award for Best Actor for his performance.

== Other uses ==
This film has no relation to the Tekken video game series or the video game based 2009 film counterpart, despite using the same name.
