= Yui Natsukawa =

Japanese actress (born 1968)

- Born: Miki Miyagawa; June 1, 1968 (age 58); Yatsushiro, Kumamoto, Japan
- Occupation: Actress
- Years active: 1987–present

Yui Natsukawa (夏川 結衣, Natsukawa Yui) is a Japanese actress. She co-starred with Hiroshi Abe in the 2006 Japanese drama The Man Who Can't Get Married and in Hirokazu Kore-eda's 2008 film Still Walking.

== Filmography ==
=== Film ===
- Sora ga Konnani Aoi Wake ga Nai (1993), Kaoru Aoki
- Yoru ga Mata Kuru (1994), Nami Tsuchiya
- Kura (1995), Seki Yamanaka
- Gonin 2 (1996), Saki
- The Trap (1996), Yuriko
- Watashitachi ga Suki datta Koto (1997), Aiko Shibata
- Shikoku (1999), Hinako Myoujin
- Acacia no Michi (2001), Kijima, Miwako
- Distance (2001), Kiyoka
- Onmyōji (2001), Fujiwara no Sukehime
- Sotsugyō (2002), Izumi
- When the Last Sword Is Drawn (2002), Shizu / Mitsu
- Spy Sorge (2003), Hideko Ozaki
- Zatōichi (2003), O-Shino, Hattori's Wife
- Yudan Tateiki (2004), Miss Makiko
- Hana (2006), Oryo
- Tales from Earthsea (2006), The Queen (voice)
- A Gentle Breeze in the Village (2007), Itoko Migita
- Still Walking (2008), Yukari Yokoyama
- Ballad (2009), Kawakami Misako
- The Lone Scalpel (2010), Namiko Nakamura
- I Wish (2011), Kyoko (Megumi's Mother)
- Hayabusa: Harukanaru Kikan (2012), Mari inoue
- Tokyo Family (2013), Fumiko Hirayama
- A Tale of Samurai Cooking (2013), Tei
- The Little House (2014), Yasuko Arai
- Solomon's Perjury (2015), Kuniko Fujino
- Soromon no gishou: Kouhen saiban (2015), Kuniko Fujino
- 125 Years Memory (2015), Yuki
- What a Wonderful Family! (2016), Fumie Hirata
- 64: Part I (2016), Mikami, Minako
- 64: Part II (2016), Mikami, Minako
- What a Wonderful Family! 2 (2017), Fumie Hirata
- What a Wonderful Family! 3: My Wife, My Life (2018)
- Red Snow (2019), Sanae Etô
- The Day's Organ (2019), Fusayo Yanai
- Hotel Royal (2020)
- The Silent Service (2023), Hitomi Sonezaki
- The Silent Service: The Battle of the Arctic Ocean (2025), Hitomi Sonezaki
- Not Me That Went Viral (2025), Mayuko Yamagata
- Suzuki=Bakudan (2025)

=== Television ===
- Taniguchi Rokuzo Shoten (1993)
- Aoi Tori (1997), Kaori Machimura
- Net Violence (2000)
- Aru Hi Arashi no Yoni (2001)
- Proof of the Man (2004), Kiriko Motomiya
- Yoshitsune (2005), Akiko (Tomomori's wife)
- Grave of the Fireflies (2005, TV Movie), Kyoko Yokokawa (Seita and Setsuko's mother)
- Kekkon Dekinai Otoko (2006), Hayasaka Natsumi
- Toilet no Kamisama (2011)
- Galileo (2013), Nogi Yuko
- The Unbrokwn (2016)
- Meet Me After School (2018), Aiko Kuroiwa
- The Fugitive (2020), Yōko Kakurai
- Ann's Lyrics: Ann Sakuragi's Haiku Lessons (2021)
- The Silent Service (2024–27), Hitomi Sonezaki
- Asura (2025)
- Human Vapor (2026), Kazumi Kirishima

== Awards and nominations ==
Year	Association	Category	Nominated work	Result	Ref.
1995	16th Yokohama Film Festival	Best New Actress	Yoru ga Mata Kuru	Won	
2001	Hōsō Bunka Foundation Award	Best Actress (Television)	Net Violence	Won	
2001	Japanese Movie Critics Awards	Best Actress	Acacia no Michi	Won	
2001	Takasaki Film Festival	Best Supporting Actress	Distance	Won	
2008	Nikkan Sports Film Awards	Best Supporting Actress	Still Walking	Won	
2009	Takasaki Film Festival	Best Supporting Actress	Still Walking	Won	
2011	32nd Yokohama Film Festival	Best Supporting Actress	The Lone Scalpel	Won	
2011	65th Mainichi Film Awards	Best Supporting Actress	The Lone Scalpel	Won	
2011	34th Japan Academy Film Prize	Best Supporting Actress	The Lone Scalpel	Nominated	
2011	34th Japan Academy Film Prize	Excellence Award	The Lone Scalpel	Won	
2011	Tokyo Sports Film Award	Best Supporting Actress	The Lone Scalpel	Won	
