= Sword of Desperation =

- Poster

Japanese name
- Kanji: 必死剣鳥刺し
Transcriptions
- Revised Hepburn: Hisshiken Torisashi
- Directed by: Hideyuki Hirayama
- Screenplay by: Hidehiro Itō; Itaru Era
- Story by: Shūhei Fujisawa
- Produced by: Hidehiro Ito; Shinya Egawa
- Starring: Etsushi Toyokawa; Chizuru Ikewaki; Kōji Kikkawa
- Cinematography: Koichi Ishii
- Edited by: Chieko Suzaki
- Music by: Edison
- Production companies: Excellent Film; TV Asahi; Pony Canyon; Sankei Shimbun; K Dash
- Distributed by: Toei Company
- Release date: July 10, 2010 (Japan)
- Running time: 114 minutes
- Country: Japan
- Language: Japanese

Sword of Desperation (Japanese: 必死剣鳥刺し, Hepburn: Hisshiken Torisashi) is a 2010 Japanese jidaigeki drama film directed by Hideyuki Hirayama. It was released in Japan on July 10, 2010. It was written by Hidehiro Itō and Itaru Era, based on a novel by Shūhei Fujisawa, and was produced by Hidehiro Itō.

== Plot ==
Ukyo-dayu, a powerful Edo-era daimyō, and his court attend a Noh play in the courtyard of his palace. The play is about a fox spirit, which is fitting given the deception and trickery that are at the heart of this story.

After the performance ends, members of the court bow in respect as Lord Ukyo and his family, including his favorite concubine Lady Renko, are leaving. Suddenly, a samurai named Sanzaemon Kanemi unsheathes his tantō and stabs Lady Renko to death. He surrenders his weapon and is taken into custody. Despite expecting to be put to death for murdering his lord's consort, Kanemi is surprised to learn that Lord Ukyo has instead sentenced him to spend a year under house arrest.

Kanemi's estate is barricaded and placed under watch by armed guards, while Kanemi himself is sealed in a makeshift cell inside a woodshed. His servants are dismissed, and only his young niece, Rio, is left to feed and care for him since his wife died years earlier from sickness. As the months pass by, Kanemi reflects on his crime and the circumstances surrounding it. Flashbacks reveal how Lady Renko had upset senior officials of the court, including Lord Ukyo's chief advisor Minbu Tsuda, by interfering with efforts to reduce unnecessary expenses such as lavish clothes for her and her ladies-in-waiting, insisting that taxes on the clan's farmers be raised even in the midst of a devastating famine, and diverting large sums of money towards the renovation of a decrepit temple controlled by her family.

Hayatonosho Obiya, a senior military commander, is horrified to discover that Lady Renko arranged for the execution of several peasants and the public display of their heads for daring to present Lord Ukyo with a petition to stop collecting taxes. He argues with his lord to get rid of Lady Renko, only to be sent away. Eventually, Tsuda realizes that something must be done and asks Kanemi to assassinate Lady Renko. He then personally convinces Lord Ukyo to spare Kanemi's life and is rewarded for his handling of the situation with a promotion in court rank.

After a year passes, Kanemi is freed from imprisonment and learns that he has been appointed to serve as Lord Ukyo's bodyguard by Tsuda. Ukyo is not pleased with this decision but refuses Kanemi's request to be dismissed from his new office. Tsuda secretly confides in Kanemi that his service as a bodyguard is in fact part of a larger strategy to deal with Obiya, who has become disillusioned with Lord Ukyo's rule and plans to remove him from power and replace him with his own handpicked daimyo. Kanemi was chosen based on Tsuda's awareness of the "Sword of Desperation", a technique Kanemi himself created in which a samurai can land an unblockable blow on an opponent. However, Kanemi explains that for the technique to work, the user must first be "half-dead", which Tsuda does not understand.

Kanemi tries to introduce Rio to a potential suitor, telling her that she will never be happy unless she marries and leaves him. However, Rio confesses that, while caring for her uncle, she developed romantic feelings for him and begs to be allowed to stay. One night, after failing to fall asleep, Kanemi visits Rio and has sex with her. The next day, he orders her to travel to a remote village and wait for him, swearing that once all of his obligations to the court are complete, he will come and find her.

Obiya arrives at Lord Ukyo's palace and forces his way past the guards, threatening him with violence if he fails to step down. Kanemi confronts him and the two men duel; Kanemi manages to lodge Obiya's sword into the wall and then fatally stab him. Suddenly, Tsuda and dozens of samurai emerge from hiding and surround him. Tsuda declares that Kanemi is a murderer and condemns him to death. Another flashback reveals that Tsuda made a promise to Lord Ukyo that once Kanemi had dealt with Obiya, he would see to it that he was executed for Lady Renko's murder.

Unwilling to hurt his fellow samurai, Kanemi is severely wounded before managing to kill a handful of his attackers and crawl on his hands and knees up to Tsuda. A blade is thrust into his shoulder, causing him to seemingly fall over and die from blood loss. As Tsuda calmly approaches his body, Kanemi springs to life and performs the "Sword of Desperation", killing Tsuda. Lord Ukyo panics and hides as his samurai repeatedly stab Kanemi while he quietly kneels and dies, a look of peace on his face. The film ends with Rio, now holding Kanemi's infant son in her arms, as she awaits his return.

== Cast ==
- Etsushi Toyokawa as Sanzaemon Kanemi
- Chizuru Ikewaki as Rio
- Kōji Kikkawa as Hayatonosho Obiya
- Naho Toda as Mutsue
- Jun Murakami as Ukyo-dayu
- Megumi Seki as Renko
- Fumiyo Kohinata as Junai Hoshina
- Ittoku Kishibe as Minbu Tsuda
