= Eisuke Nakazono =

Japanese writer

Eisuke Nakazono (中薗 英助, Nakazono Eisuke; August 27, 1920 – April 9, 2002), pen-name for Hideki Nakazono, was one of Japan's pioneer writers of spy fiction.

Nakazono was born in Fukuoka Prefecture. As a young man he was a journalist in China from 1938 to 1946 in China. He became a writer of spy novels and essays after he returned to Japan. He won the 1992 Yomiuri Prize for his "book of recollections" of his time in China, Peking hanten kyūkan nite. In 2002 he died of pneumonia at a hospital in Kawasaki, Kanagawa, at the age of 81. The South Korean film KT (2002) was based on Nakazono's novel Rachi (1983).
