= Vibrator (film) =

- Film poster

Japanese name
- Kana: ヴァイブレータ
- Directed by: Ryūichi Hiroki
- Screenplay by: Haruhiko Arai
- Based on: Vibrator by Mari Akasaka
- Produced by: Akira Morishige; Kenji Komatsu; Yoshihiro Nagata
- Starring: Shinobu Terajima; Nao Ōmori; Tomorowo Taguchi
- Cinematography: Kazuhiro Suzuki
- Edited by: Ryūichi Hiroki
- Music by: Hikaru Ishikawa
- Production companies: Cinequanon; Eisei Gekijo; Nippon Group Holdings; Studio Three
- Release date: December 6, 2003 (Japan)
- Running time: 95 minutes
- Country: Japan
- Language: Japanese

Vibrator (Japanese: ヴァイブレータ, Hepburn: Vaiburēta) is a 2003 Japanese film directed by Ryūichi Hiroki. It is based on the 1999 book of the same name by writer Mari Akasaka.

== Plot ==
After meeting a handsome truck driver (Nao Omori) in an urban mini-mart, a 30-something freelance writer (Shinobu Terajima) embarks on a life-changing emotional journey of sexual discovery.

== Cast ==
- Shinobu Terajima
- Nao Omori
- Tomorowo Taguchi
- Masahiro Toda
- Eriko Takayanagi
- Riho Makise
- Miki Sakajo
- Jun Murakami
- Eugene Nomura

== Awards and nominations ==
25th Yokohama Film Festival

- Won: Best Film
- Won: Best Director – Ryūichi Hiroki
- Won: Best Screenplay – Haruhiko Arai
- Won: Best Actress – Shinobu Terajima
- Won: Best Supporting Actor – Nao Ōmori
