= When the Last Sword Is Drawn =

- Theatrical poster for When the Last Sword Is Drawn (2003)
- Directed by: Yōjirō Takita
- Screenplay by: Takehiro Nakajima
- Based on: When the Last Sword Is Drawn by Jiro Asada
- Produced by: Nozomu Enoki; Hideji Miyajima
- Starring: Kiichi Nakai; Kōichi Satō; Yui Natsukawa; Takehiro Murata
- Cinematography: Takeshi Hamada
- Edited by: Nobuko Tomita
- Music by: Joe Hisaishi
- Distributed by: Shochiku
- Release date: November 4, 2002 (Japan)
- Running time: 137 minutes
- Country: Japan
- Language: Japanese
- Budget: $4,000,000
- Box office: $2,487,338

When the Last Sword Is Drawn (Japanese: 壬生義士伝, Hepburn: Mibu Gishi Den; lit. "Legend of the Loyal Retainers of Mibu") is a 2002 historical drama film directed by Yōjirō Takita and loosely based on real historical events. When the Last Sword Is Drawn won the Best Film award at the 2004 Japanese Academy Awards, as well as the prizes for Best Actor (Kiichi Nakai) and Best Supporting Actor (Kōichi Satō). It received a further eight nominations.

== Synopsis ==
The film tells the story of two Shinsengumi samurai. Saitō Hajime (played by Kōichi Satō) is a heartless killer. Yoshimura Kanichiro (played by Kiichi Nakai) appears to be a money-grabbing and emotional swordsman from the northern area known as Nambu Morioka.

The main storyline is set during the fall of the Tokugawa shogunate, but it is told in a series of flashbacks as Saitō and another man reminisce. The themes include conflicting loyalty to the clan, lord, and family.

More than just swordplay, it is the story of a man willing to do anything for the good of his family, even if it means never being able to see them.

== Cast ==
- Kiichi Nakai — Yoshimura Kanichiro
- Kōichi Satō — Saitō Hajime
- Yui Natsukawa — Shizu/Mitsu
- Takehiro Murata — Ono Chiaki
- Miki Nakatani — Nui
- Yuji Miyake — Ohno Jiroemon
- Sansei Shiomi — Kondō Isami
- Eugene Nomura — Hijikata Toshizo
- Masato Sakai — Okita Soji
- Atsushi Itō — Young Chiaki Ono
- Kanji Tsuda — Ōkubo Toshimichi
- Hideaki Itō — Tokugawa Yoshinobu
