= Mari Akasaka =

Japanese novelist

- Born: 13 May 1964 (age 62); Tokyo, Japan
- Occupation: novelist

Mari Akasaka (赤坂 真理, Akasaka Mari; born 13 May 1964) is a Japanese novelist.

== Biography ==
Mari Akasaka was born in Suginami, Tokyo, and studied Politics in the Law Department at Keio University. In 1999 her novel Vibrator was nominated for the Akutagawa Prize. She was again nominated for the Akutagawa Prize in 2000 for her novel, Muse, and won the Noma Literary Prize for New Writers for the same novel.

Vibrator was adapted into a 2003 film directed by Ryūichi Hiroki, starring Shinobu Terajima and Nao Ōmori. The English translation of the book was published in 2005.

== Works ==
- Chō no Hifu no Shita (1997)
- Vibrator (1998)
- Vanille (1999)
- Calling (1999)
- Muse (1999)
- Kare ga Kanojo no Onna Datta Koro (2003)
- Taiyō no Namida (2008)
- Tokyo Prison (2012)
