= Still Walking =

- Film poster
- Directed by: Hirokazu Kore-eda
- Written by: Hirokazu Kore-eda
- Produced by: Yoshihiro Kato; Satoshi Kōno; Hijiri Taguchi; Masahiro Yasuda
- Starring: Hiroshi Abe; Yui Natsukawa; You; Kazuya Takahashi; Shohei Tanaka; Susumu Terajima; Kirin Kiki; Yoshio Harada
- Cinematography: Yutaka Yamasaki
- Edited by: Hirokazu Kore-eda
- Music by: Gontiti
- Production company: CineQuanon
- Distributed by: Cine Qua Non Films
- Release date: June 28, 2008 (Japan)
- Running time: 114 minutes
- Country: Japan
- Language: Japanese
- Box office: $3.26 million

Still Walking (Japanese: 歩いても 歩いても, Hepburn: Aruitemo aruitemo) is a 2008 Japanese film edited, written, and directed by Hirokazu Kore-eda. The film is a portrait of a family over roughly 24 hours as they commemorate the death of the eldest son. The film was widely praised by critics and won the Golden Astor for Best Film at the 2008 Mar del Plata International Film Festival.

== Plot ==
The Yokoyama family come together every year to commemorate the death of the eldest son, Junpei, who accidentally drowned 12 years ago while saving the life of a boy. His father Kyohei, a retired doctor, and mother Toshiko are joined by their surviving son Ryota, who has recently married a widow (Yukari) with a young son (Atsushi), and their daughter Chinami, her husband and their children. Ryota resents knowing that Junpei was the favorite son, whose belongings are still left untouched by Toshiko, and that his parents attribute positive memories of him to Junpei; a bitter Kyohei, who is still mourning his son, has always been disappointed that Ryota went into art restoration instead of becoming a doctor and taking over the family business like Junpei. Meanwhile, Chinami pushes the idea of moving her family in with her ageing parents in order to take care of them.

Kyohei and Toshiko are initially distant and cold to Yukari, openly believing it to be bad luck for Ryota to marry a widow, but eventually warm up to her and the shy Atsushi due to Yukari's kindness and push to bond. The family spends the day reminiscing and discussing their personal lives and careers, though Ryota only privately reveals to Yukari that he is struggling to find gainful employment in his field of art restoration. Ryota tries to confront his father after he catches Kyohei advising Atsushi to go into medicine, but Kyohei rebuffs his attempts. In the evening, they are visited by Yoshio, the boy Junpei died rescuing 12 years ago. The meeting is strained and uncomfortable; most of the family is angry and disappointed that Yoshio, now 25, is fat, lazy, and aimless, and believe that he should have died instead of Junpei. Only Ryota, who empathizes with feeling inferior to Junpei, defends him, and implores Toshiko to stop inviting him and making him feel guilty over Junpei's death. Toshiko refuses, telling him that Junpei's death would be too much to bear without having someone to blame for it, and that being reminded of the death once a year is the least Yoshio can do.

Chinami and her family depart for home, and the rest of the family gather for dinner. Yukari asks questions about Toshiko and Kyohei's marriage, which reveals years of mutual resentment and disappointment, though the couple nevertheless remains together. Toshiko reveals the couple's personal romantic song, Blue Light Yokohama by Ayumi Ishida, which Kyohei was unaware of. Toshiko explains that one night, she heard Kyohei singing the song from another woman's house, and Toshiko then purchased a record of the song's album and would listen to it in private. At night, a butterfly gets into the house and lands on Junpei's picture; Toshiko believes it is Junpei, and though Ryota is too cynical to agree, he captures and releases the butterfly outside. Toshiko advises Ryota not to have a child with Yukari so that it would be easier for them to divorce. During the night, the Yokoyamas' neighbor makes an emergency call due to chest pains, and Kyohei, distressed, advises her to call an ambulance and apologizes for not being of more help before watching her be taken away to the same hospital that had put his family clinic out of business.

Ryota, Yukari, and Atsushi leave in the morning. Though Kyohei and Toshiko look forward to seeing them for New Year's, Ryota and Yukari privately agree to renege on the meeting. As they drive away, Ryota explains in a voiceover that Kyohei died a few years later, with Toshiko dying shortly after, without Chinami moving in or Ryota having fulfilled the promises he made to them earlier during the reunion. The film ends with Ryota's family – now including a young daughter – tending to the Yokoyama family graves, with Ryota continuing the same rituals and sayings that he'd learnt from his mother.

== Cast ==
- Hiroshi Abe as Ryota Yokoyama
- Yui Natsukawa as Yukari Yokoyama
- You as Chinami Kataoka
- Kazuya Takahashi as Nobuo Kataoka
- Shohei Tanaka as Atsushi Yokoyama
- Susumu Terajima as Sushi deliverer
- Kirin Kiki as Toshiko Yokoyama
- Yoshio Harada as Kyohei Yokoyama

== Production ==
In an interview with Kore-eda included in the Blu-Ray release of the movie, the director candidly discussed how much – but not all – of the movie was motivated by memories of his own childhood and the eventual death of his mother. On the same disk, a short "making of" supplement showed how many of the film's scenes were brought to life from the script during rehearsals or invented outright while shooting on location in what appeared to be the Yokohama area south of Tokyo.

== Reception ==
Still Walking received wide acclaim from film critics. Review aggregator Rotten Tomatoes reports a perfect approval rating of 100% based on 64 reviews, with a weighted average of 8.3/10. The site's consensus reads: "Hirokazu Kore-eda's film may seem modest at first, but this family drama casts a delicate, entrancing spell". Metacritic ranked the film at 89%, which was based on 21 reviews. In a Chicago Sun-Times review, Roger Ebert gave the work four stars and touted that Kore-eda is an heir of Yasujirō Ozu. Trevor Johnston of Sight & Sound wrote that "however one positions Still Walking in the firmament of Japan's cinematic achievements, one thing is sure: it belongs up there with the masters." The film won the Asian Film Award for Best Director, and was nominated for the Grand Prix of the Belgian Syndicate of Cinema Critics. It was also the choice of Joshua Rothkopf in IndieWire's 2018 list of the best Japanese films of the 21st century.

== See also ==
- List of films with a 100% rating on Rotten Tomatoes, a film review aggregator website
