= Kōichi Satō (actor) =

Japanese actor (born 1960)

Koichi Sato
- 佐藤 浩市
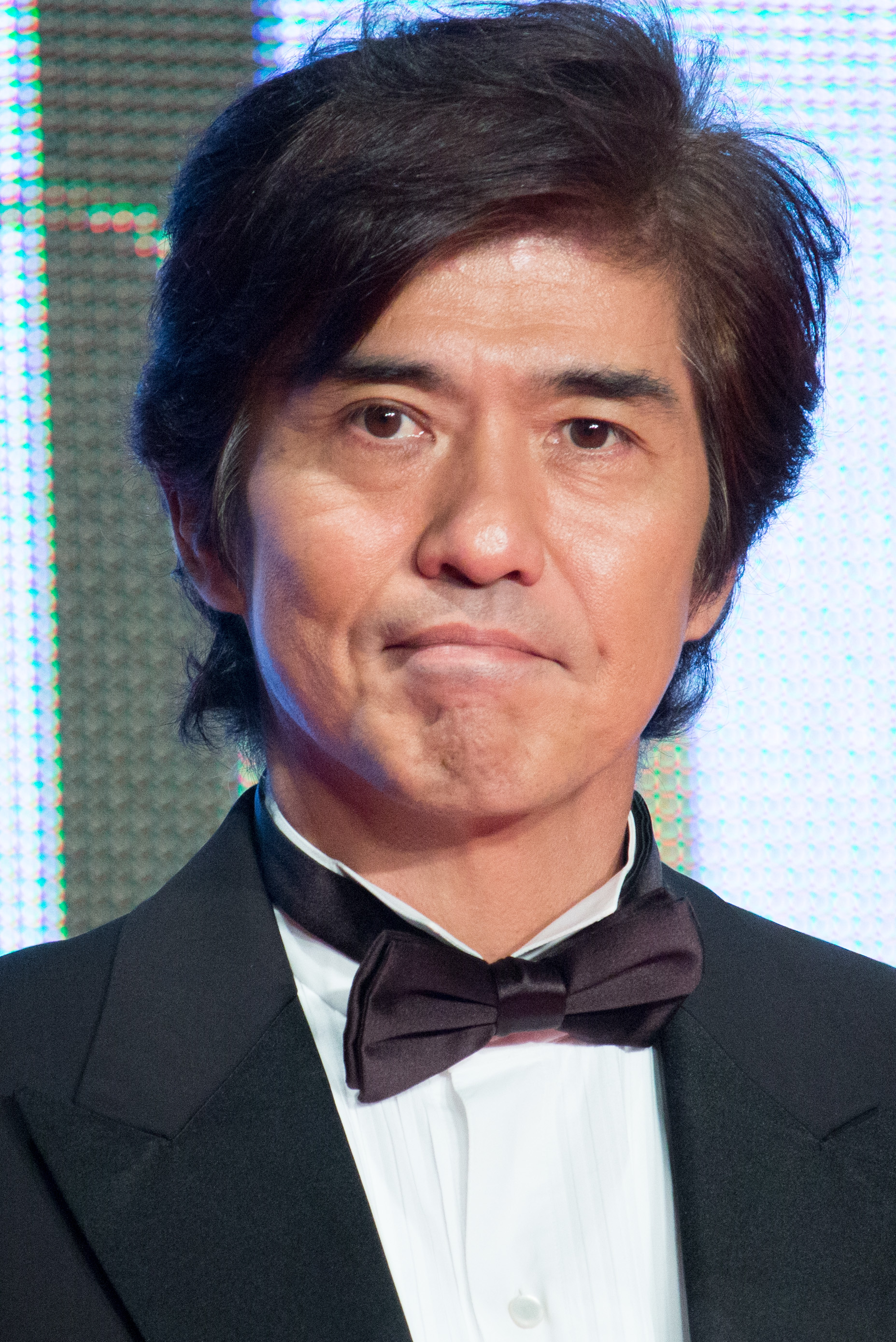
- Koichi Sato at 28th Tokyo International Film Festival
- Born: December 10, 1960 (age 65); Shinjuku, Tokyo, Japan
- Occupation: Actor
- Years active: 1980–present
- Spouse: Ayaka Hirota (m. 1993)
- Children: 2 (including Kanichiro)
- Parent: Rentarō Mikuni (father)
- Musical career
- Genre: Blues
- Instrument: Vocals
- Label: Universal Music Japan
- Website: Theatre de Poche Official Web (in Japanese); Universal Music Official Website (in Japanese)

Koichi Sato (佐藤 浩市, Satō Kōichi; born December 10, 1960) is a Japanese actor. He is the son of actor Rentarō Mikuni. He is known for his acting skills and has won three individual Blue Ribbon Awards in the categories of Best Newcomer (1982), Best Actor (2003), and Best Supporting Actor (2024). He is the first actor to win three individual awards since his father, Rentarō Mikuni.

== Early years ==
Sato was born in 1960 in Kagurazaka, Shinjuku, Tokyo. His mother was a geisha working there. His father was actor Rentarō Mikuni, and it was Mikuni ‘s third marriage.

Sato’s given name Koichi (浩市) was taken from one Kanji character each from the film directors name Hiroshi Inagaki (稲垣 浩) and Kon Ichikawa (市川 崑), with whom Mikuni was close at the time. Sato was often taken to the filming location by Mikuni since he was a child. However, Mikuni left home when Sato was in the fifth grade, and his parents officially divorced at the following year, when he was eleven years old. A scene where Mikuni took Sato to Jukkoku Pass in Izu, Shizuoka and said, "This is my last farewell to you. You go back to your mother's. I'm going to start a wandering life." is a well-known episode. (Note: In an attempt to entertain others, Mikuni told his own personal history, which was a mixture of fiction and fact, and as he told it, he tended to assume that it was true. The episode of parting with Sato at Jukkoku Pass is a story Mikuni himself told in various media. Sato later said that although it is true that he and Mikuni visited Jukkoku Pass many times, he did not hear anything special from him in the divorce.)

Mikuni, known for his free-spirited personality, seldom came home, and his mother was often away from home, so Sato, who was an only child, grew independent from an early age and was used to being on his own. (Note: Until Mikuni left home, Sato's grandmother, aunts, and uncles (Mikuni's mother, sister, and brother) lived together in a house in Kagurazaka, and Mikuni took care of their living expenses.) Sato said that he didn't really recognize Mikuni as a father and that it was rather distressing to have dinner with him when he occasionally came home.

== Career ==
Sato left home during his high school years and entered the film department of Tama Art Academy, a vocational school attached to Tama Art University, but dropped out after one year. In 1980, while still in school, he was invited by an acquaintance of his father to make his acting debut in the NHK TV series Sequel to the Case, starring Tomisaburo Wakayama, and the following year he made his film debut in the movie The Gate of Youth. When he saw this film in the movie theater and saw his own image on the screen, he made a renewed decision to live his life as an actor.

His acting ability was recognized early on, and he went on to win a string of awards for the films he appeared in. For The Gate of Youth, he won Japan Academy Film Prize for Newcomer of the Year and the Blue Ribbon Award for Best Newcomer. He won the Blue Ribbon Award for Best Actor for KT and Utsutsu in 2002 and Best Supporting Actor in 2023. He is the first actor since his father, Rentarō Mikuni, to win three Blue Ribbon Awards for individual awards.

Sato said that his encounter with the two directors was a major turning point for him. The two directors are Shinji Sōmai, director of the 1983 film The Catch and Junji Sakamoto, director of the 1994 film Tokarev. Director Somai taught him, "Sadness and anger are not one thing. Try to express your anger in ten different ways. You are not sad because you cry, but you laugh because you are sad." In Sakamoto's Tokarev, Sato played the role of an infant kidnapper, and he discussed the character of this villain with the director, expressing his opinions. The director acknowledged Sato's opinion, and they worked while discussing, which Sato said was very stimulating for him to act. He and Sakamoto hit it off and became a regular actor in Sakamoto's films and appeared in many of his films, including Face, KT, Children of the Dark, and Human Trust. Debates about acting can get heated, and Sato and Sakamoto once got into a fight in a bar and were interceded by Yoshio Harada, who was there. In 2023, Sato and his son Kanichiro co-starred in Sakamoto's film Okiku and the World.

Sato also said that his encounter with director Kōki Mitani opened up a new path for him. Sato took on the challenge of a full-fledged comedy in The Magic Hour, a 2008 film directed by Mitani, in which he had never acted before. The scene in which he plays Murata, an unsuccessful actor, comically keeps jumping on a trampoline and licks a knife "with a bizarre look on his face" as described in the script written by Mitani was so impressive that the scene was even imitated by a impersonator. This role, played by Sato, who had a strong image as a serious actor, became a topic of conversation, and the film led Sato to broaden his acting range into the field of comedy.

== Arguments with the director ==
Since his debut, Sato used to insist what he thought as an actor and argued vehemently with the director on the set, as did his father. His attitude was sometimes described as cheeky. When he was over 30 years old, Sato received a letter from Mikuni one day. In the letter, Mikuni wrote only one sentence, "Ikasarete areba koso (生かされてあればこそ)." It meant, "You are kept alive by those around you." Initially, Sato did not quite understand what the words meant. Sato said that Mikuni probably did not think well of his attitude and behavior at the time, as if he was living by himself, and that in later years he gradually came to feel the weight of those words within himself. In addition to that, one day when he was over 40 years old, a veteran female staff member said to him, "You may think you have won by arguing with the director, but it is not only the director who has lost, but all the staff members on site are feeling miserable." He realized that the director represents the entire staff. Since then, he has taken the approach of having the director listen to his opinions in advance and discuss them until he is satisfied.

== Relationship with Mikuni ==
Since his debut, he has felt conflicted about being called "Rentaro Mikuni's son," and in his 20s and 30s he often felt anger at being called that no matter how hard he worked at acting and achieved results. For many years, Sato had been said to have a feud with Mikuni. Sato and Mikuni first worked together in 1986 in A Promise, but there was little contact between the two in that film. Ten years later, in 1996, the two co-starred in earnest on a film adaptation of a manga series Oishinbo. Mikuni, who was cast to play the role of Yuuzan Kaibara, nominated Sato to play his son Shiro Yamaoka. However, during the press conference, the two called each other "Mikuni-san" and "Sato-kun" as if they were strangers, (Note: "san" and "kun" is the honorific suffix, meaning "dear" or "honorable Mr".) and they were reportedly at odds over their acting theories, reporting to a father-son feud. However, since the content of the movie was also about a father-son feud, Sato did not dare to deny the "non-getting along" theory at the time. However, after Sato's son Kanichiro was born in 1996, Mikuni dearly loved on his grandson and showed up at his sports event at school, and the father-son rift is said to have disappeared gradually. When Mikuni died in 2013, Sato said of his father, "He was a terrible man as a father. The only thing that existed between him and me was the word 'actor'."

Before his debut, Sato told his father that he would become an actor. Mikuni's only response was "Ah, is that so." When he later asked, "Why did you say it like that?" Mikuni replied he had been concerned, "Ah, this guy is going to do acting. But what would this guy do if he didn't have anything?" Actually, after Sato's debut, Mikuni went around asking people who were going to work with Sato to take good care of his son. Later Sato's son, Kanichiro, later told him that he also hoped to be an actor, Sato understood the concern his father had felt about him. Sato could only say "Ah, so," like his father.

== Musical Activities ==
Sato began singing at the urging of senior actor Yoshio Harada, and since his first stage appearance in 2012 at the Yoshio Harada Memorial Live, he has regularly sung on stage with fellow actors. On December 10, 2021, his first album as a singer, Yakusha Uta 60 Alive was released on his birthday. According to Universal Music Japan, the genre in which he sings is blues. This album is a double CD and DVD set, and the DVD includes a live performance without an audience recorded at Blue Note Tokyo. Close actor friends Akira Terao, Ryudo Uzaki, Noritake Kinashi, Yōsuke Eguchi, and Yukiyoshi Ozawa also participated in the live performances as guests.

== Personal life ==
In his personal life, he married in his 20s and had one child, but later divorced. He remarried in 1993 to stage actress Ayako Hirota, and their first son, Kanichiro, made his acting debut in 2017. Accepting the wishes of his wife, who is a volunteer, he has been working with the Tokyo Metropolitan Government's "Friend Home" program since around 2018 to temporarily care for children from infant homes and orphanages on weekends and during vacations through the foster care system.

== Filmography ==
=== Film ===
Year	Title	Role	Notes	Ref.
1981	The Gate of Youth	Shinsuke Ibuki		
1981	Manon	Itaru		
1982	Dotonbori River			
1982	The Gate of Youth: Part 2	Shinsuke Ibuki	Lead role	
1983	Antarctica			
1983	The Catch			
1983	Battle Anthem			
1984	Fireflies in the North			
1984	Mishima: A Life in Four Chapters			
1984	Mitsugetsu		Lead role	
1985	Penguin's Memory	Mike Davis (voice)	Lead role	
1985	Kids			
1985	Love Hotel			
1986	A Promise			
1986	Death Powder	Kiyoshi	Lead role	
1986	Bound for the Fields, the Mountains and the Seacoast			
1988	The Silk Road	Zhao Xingde	Lead role	
1989	Shadow of China	Akira Kitayama		
1989	Company-Sponsored Funeral			
1990	Ruten no umi			
1991	Psychic Girl Reiko			
1994	Crest of Betrayal	Tamiya Iemon	Lead role	
1994	Tokarev			
1995	Gonin	Mikihiko Bandai	Lead role	
1995	Pu	Kishore	Lead role	
1996	Oishinbo	Shirō Yamaoka	Lead role	
1996	Gonin 2	Mikihiko Bandai		
1997	Lie Lie Lie		Lead role	
1997	30	Suzuki		
1998	Spiral	Mitsuo Andō	Lead role	
1998	Wait and See		Lead role	
2000	Face			
2000	Whiteout			
2000	New Battles Without Honor and Humanity			
2002	KT	Masuo Tomita	Lead role	
2002	Utsutsu		Lead role	
2003	Rockers			
2003	When the Last Sword Is Drawn	Saitō Hajime		
2003	Samurai Resurrection	Yagyū Jūbei Mitsuyoshi		
2003	Wild Berries			
2004	Infection	Dr. Akiba	Lead role	
2005	Aegis			
2005	What the Snow Brings	Takeo Yazaki		
2005	Sea Cat			
2006	Waiting in the Dark			
2006	The Uchoten Hotel			
2006	Starfish Hotel	Arisu	Lead role	
2006	A Cheerful Gang Turns the Earth			
2007	Sukiyaki Western Django	Taira no Kiyomori		
2007	Smile			
2007	Love Never to End			
2007	A Gentle Breeze in the Village			
2008	The Magic Hour	Taiki Murata	Lead role	
2008	Nobody to Watch Over Me		Lead role	
2008	Children of the Dark			
2008	Free and Easy 19			
2009	Kamui Gaiden	Mizutani Gumbei		
2009	Brass Knuckle Boys			
2009	Amalfi: Rewards of the Goddess			
2010	Heaven's Story			
2010	The Last Ronin	Terasaka Kichiemon	Lead role	
2011	A Ghost of a Chance	Taiki Murata		
2011	Unfair 2: The Answer			
2011	That's the Way!!			
2011	Someday			
2012	Dearest	Shin'ichi Nanbara		
2012	Reunion			
2012	The Floating Castle			
2013	The Kiyosu Conference	Ikeda Tsuneoki		
2013	Unforgiven			
2013	Human Trust		Lead role	
2013	A Chair on the Plains		Lead role	
2014	The Vancouver Asahi			
2014	Time Trip App	Saigō Takamori		
2015	The Pearls of the Stone Man		Lead role	
2015	Terminal		Lead role	
2015	Hero			
2015	Unfair: The End			
2015	Gonin Saga	Mikihiko Bandai	Cameo	
2015	Galaxy Turnpike	Taiki Murata		
2016	64: Part I	Yoshinobu Mikami	Lead role	
2016	64: Part II	Yoshinobu Mikami	Lead role	
2016	Midnight Diner 2	Ishida		
2017	Flower and Sword	Sen no Rikyū		
2018	Sakura Guardian in the North			
2018	My Friend A	Shūji Yamauchi		
2018	A Banana? At This Time of Night?			
2019	The Fable	The Boss		
2019	Hit me Anyone One More Time			
2019	The Promised Land			
2019	Red Snow			
2019	The Landlady			
2019	Aircraft Carrier Ibuki	PM Keiichirō Tarumi		
2019	Almost a Miracle	Hino		
2020	Fukushima 50	Toshio Isaki	Lead role	
2020	The Gun 2020			
2020	I Never Shot Anyone	Michio Kodama		
2020	Silent Tokyo	Jin Asahina	Lead role	
2020	Bolt	Yoshida (voice)		
2021	Kiba: The Fangs of Fiction	Ryūji Tōmatsu		
2021	The Sun Stands Still	Takeshi Kazama		
2021	The Fable: The Killer Who Doesn't Kill	The Boss		
2022	Soul at Twenty	Ken'ichi Takahashi		
2022	Kingdom 2: Far and Away	Lü Buwei		
2023	Baian the Assassin, M.D. 2	Inoue Hanjūrō		
2023	Familia	Komaba		
2023	One Last Bloom	Jin'ichi Hirooka	Lead role	
2023	Nemesis: The Mystery of the Golden Spiral	Mado		
2023	Kingdom 3: The Flame of Destiny	Lü Buwei		
2023	We're Broke, My Lord!	Ikkosai		
2023	Okiku and the World	Genbei		
2023	Masked Hearts			
2024	The Box Man	General		
2024	Sin and Evil	Kasahara	Special appearance	
2024	Kingdom 4: Return of the Great General	Lü Buwei		
2024	Tomorrow in the Finder			
2025	Gosh!!			
2025	Unforgettable	Doctor		
2025	Climbing for Life	Masaaki Tabe		
2025	Happy End	Narrator	Documentary	
2025	After the Quake	Katagiri	Lead role	
2025	One Last Throw	Tsutomu Kadokura		
2026	One Last Love Letter	Shinsuke's father		
2026	Kingdom 5: The Clash of Souls	Lü Buwei		
2026	The Secret Battlefield	Hideki Tojo		
2027	Hara o Kukutte			
2027	The Gate of Murder	Gan-san		
2027	All That Exists	Sakunosuke Kishi		

=== Television ===
Year	Title	Role	Notes	Ref.
1986	Musashibō Benkei	Kiso Yoshinaka		
1990	Tobu ga Gotoku	Sakamoto Ryōma	Taiga drama	
1991	Takeda Shingen	Uesugi Kenshin	TV movie	
1992	Shin'ai naru Mono e			
1993	Hotel Doctor		Lead role	
1993	Subarashiki kana Jinsei			
1993–94	Homura Tatsu	Minamoto no Yoshiie	Taiga drama	
1994	Yokohama Shinjū		Lead role	
1995	Koi mo Nidome nara			
1995	Koibito yo			
1995	The Abe Clan	Abe Yagobei	TV movie	
1996	Tsubasa o Kudasai!			
1998	Tabloid			
1999	Africa no Yoru			
1999	Dokushin Seikatsu			
2000	Tenki-yoho no Koibito	Katsuhiko Yano	Lead role	
2001	Aru Hi, Arashi no You ni			
2001	Chūshingura 1/47	Ōishi Kuranosuke	TV movie	
2002	Tengoku e no Kaidan		Lead role	
2003	Welcome to the High Plains	Seiji Omokawa	Lead role	
2004	Shinsengumi!	Serizawa Kamo	Taiga drama	
2004	Pride	Yūichirō Hyōdō		
2005	Climber's High	Kazumasa Yūki	Lead role, miniseries	
2006	The Animal Trail			
2006	Suppli	Imaoka		
2007	High and Low	Kingo Gondō	Lead role, TV movie	
2009	The Summer of the Bureaucrats	Shingo Kazakoshi	Lead role	
2010	Wagaya no Rekishi	Taizo Onizuka	Miniseries	
2012	The Locked Room Murders	Gō Serizawa		
2014	Leaders	Saichiro Aichi	Lead role, miniseries	
2015	Murder on the Orient Express	Tōdō	Miniseries	
2016	Botchan		Special appearance, TV movie	
2016	Sogeki		Lead role, TV movie	
2017	Leaders 2	Saichiro Aichi	Lead role, TV movie	
2017	Ishitsubute		Lead role	
2018	Jimmy: The True Story of a True Idiot	Keisuke Miyake		
2018	As a Father of Murderer Son	Keiichi Yoshinaga	Lead role, TV movie	
2018	Cold Case Season 2	Naoya Terayama	Episode 4	
2020	The Sun Stands Still: The Eclipse	Takeshi Kazama	Miniseries	
2021	Okehazama	Saitō Dōsan	TV movie	
2021	Bullets, Bones and Blocked Noses	Yukio Nonishi	Miniseries	
2022	The 13 Lords of the Shogun	Kazusa Hirotsune	Taiga drama	
2023	What Will You Do, Ieyasu?	Sanada Masayuki	Taiga drama	
2024	Like a Dragon: Yakuza	Masaru Sera		
2025	After the Quake	Katagiri	Lead role; miniseries	
2025	The Big Chase: Tokyo SSBC Files	Shunsuke Kuze		
2025	Simulation: Defeat in the Summer of 1941	Hideki Tojo	Miniseries	
2025	Passing the Reins	Kozo Sanno		
2026	Water Margin	Wang Jin		

== Awards and nominations ==
Years	Awards	department	work(s)	Result	Ref.
1982	24th Blue Ribbon Awards	Best New Actor	The Gate of Youth	Won	
1982	5th Japan Academy Film Prize	Newcomer of the Year	The Gate of Youth	Won	
1984	8th Elan d'or Awards	Newcomer of the Year	Himself	Won	
1984	7th Japan Academy Film Prize	Best Supporting Actor	The Catch	Nominated	
1995	18th Japan Academy Film Prize	Best Actor	Crest of Betrayal	Won	
1995	7th Nikkan Sports Film Award	Best Actor	Crest of Betrayal	Won	
1995	16th Yokohama Film Festival	Best Supporting Actor	Tokarev	Won	
1996	10th Takasaki Film Festival	Best Actor	Gonin	Won	
2001	24th Japan Academy Film Prize	Best Supporting Actor	Whiteout	Won	
2001	15th Takasaki Film Festival	Best Supporting Actor	Face	Won	
2003	12th Japanese Movie Critics Awards	Best Actor	KT	Won	
2003	45th Blue Ribbon Awards	Best Actor	KT	Won	
2004	27th Japan Academy Film Prize	Best Supporting Actor	When the Last Sword Is Drawn	Won	
2006	32nd Hōsō-Bunka Foundation Award	Performance Award	Climber's High	Won	
2007	61st Mainichi Film Awards	Best Actor	What the Snow Brings	Won	
2007	18th Tokyo International Film Festival	Best Actor Award	What the Snow Brings	Won	
2007	61st Japan Broadcast Film and Arts Awards	Excellence Award	What the Snow Brings	Won	
2007	30th Japan Academy Film Prize	Best Supporting Actor	The Uchoten Hotel	Nominated	
2007	61st Japan Broadcast Film and Arts Awards	Best Actor	Honto to Uso to Tequila	Nominated	
2008	1st International Drama Festival in Tokyo	Best Actor	Kaze no Hate, Tengoku to Jigoku, and Honto to Uso to Tequila	Won	
2009	63rd Japan Broadcast Film and Arts Awards	Best Actor Award	Honto to Uso to Tequila	Won	
2009	32nd Japan Academy Film Prize	Best Supporting Actor	The Magic Hour	Nominated	
2012	35th Japan Academy Film Prize	Best Supporting Actor	The Last Ronin	Nominated	
2013	36th Japan Academy Film Prize	Best Supporting Actor	Anata e	Nominated	
2013	36th Japan Academy Film Prize	Best Supporting Actor	The Floating Castle	Nominated	
2015	40th Hochi Film Award	Best Actor	Kishūteneki Terminal and The Pearls of the Stone Man	Won	
2016	29th Nikkan Sports Film Award	Best Actor	64: Part I and 64: Part II	Won	
2016	39th Japan Academy Film Prize	Best Actor	Kishūteneki Terminal	Nominated	
2017	40th Japan Academy Film Prize	Best Actor	64: Part I	Won	
2018	5th Kyoto International Art and Film Festival	Toshiro Mifune Award	Himself	Won	
2024	45th Yokohama Film Festival	Best Supporting Actor	Familia, Baian the Assassin, M.D. 2, Okiku and the World and Masked Hearts	Won	
2024	66th Blue Ribbon Awards	Best Supporting Actor	Okiku and the World, Masked Hearts and One Last Bloom	Won	
