= 800 Two Lap Runners =

- Directed by: Ryūichi Hiroki
- Screenplay by: Masato Kato
- Based on: novel by Makoto Kawashima
- Produced by: Isao Yoshiwara
- Starring: Shunsuke Matsuoka; Eugene Nomura
- Cinematography: Naoki Kayano
- Music by: Motohiro Tomita
- Distributed by: Herald Ace (ヘラルド・エース)
- Release date: July 9, 1994
- Running time: 110 minutes
- Country: Japan
- Language: Japanese

800 Two Lap Runners is a 1994 Japanese film directed by Ryūichi Hiroki starring Shunsuke Matsuoka and Eugene Nomura. For director Hiroki, the film marks a transition from his early work in pink film to mainstream cinema.

== Plot ==
This coming-of-age story revolves around two young long distance runners, Kenji Hirose and Ryuji Nakazawa. Kenji, haunted by memories of his dead friend Aihara with whom he had a brief homosexual affair, is now dating Aihara's former girlfriend Kyoko, but Kyoko is more interested in Kenji than he is in her. Ryuji, Kenji's friend and track rival, is pursuing hurdler Shoko but she in turn is after Kenji. Ryuji does have his own admirer, Nao, Kenji's younger sister, but when they do get together, Nao resembles her brother too much for Ryuji to go through with the lovemaking.

== Cast ==
- Shunsuke Matsuoka (松岡俊介) as Kenji Hirose
- Eugene Nomura (野村祐人) as Ryuji Nakazawa
- Tsugumi Arimura (有村つぐみ) as Shoko Ida
- Miwako Kawai (河合みわこ) as Kyoko Yamaguchi
- Reiko Shiraishi (白石玲子) as Nao Hirose
- Yoshihiko Hakamada (袴田吉彦) as Aihara
- Naomi Sawada (沢田奈緒美) as Tomomi Ogawa
- Yūki Tanaka (田中優樹) as Shunichi Saitō

== Release ==
800 Two Lap Runners was screened at the Berlin International Film Festival in the "Panorama" section in February 1994 before its theatrical release in Japan on July 9, 1994, by Herald Ace (ヘラルド・エース). It was released on DVD in Japan by Pioneer LDC on May 24, 2002.

== Reception ==
Kinema Junpo magazine placed the film at number 7 in its list of the ten best Japanese films of 1994. At the 16th Yokohama Film Festival held in January 1995, 800 Two Lap Runners was listed as the fourth best film of 1994 and actor Shunsuke Matsuoka was given one of the Best New Talent Awards. The film also took two awards at the 49th annual Mainichi Film Awards, Eugene Nomura for Best New Talent and Naoki Kayano for Cinematography.
