= A Gentle Breeze in the Village =

Japanese manga series

- Cover of Tennen Kokekkō volume 14 as published by Shueisha

天然コケッコー (Tennen Kokekkō)
- Genre: Slice of life
- Manga
- Written by: Fusako Kuramochi
- Published by: Shueisha
- English publisher: Shueisha (digital)
- Magazine: Chorus
- Original run: 1994 – 2000
- Volumes: 14
- Live-action film
- Directed by: Nobuhiro Yamashita
- Written by: Aya Watanabe
- Released: July 24, 2007
- Runtime: 121 minutes

A Gentle Breeze in the Village, also known as Tennen Kokekkō (天然コケッコー; lit. "Natural Cock-a-doodle-doo"), is a Japanese slice of life manga series written and illustrated by Fusako Kuramochi. It was serialized in the magazine Chorus from 1994 to 2000.

The manga won the 20th Kodansha Manga Award in 1996.

It was adapted as a movie in 2007, directed by Nobuhiro Yamashita and starring Kaho. It was released on July 24, 2007.

Shueisha began publishing the manga in English, under the title Pure and Natural Cock-A-Doodle-Doo, on its Manga Million digital platform in 2026.

== Plot summary ==
Soyo Migita (Kaho) is the eldest of six students attending a combined primary and junior high school. She experiences school as a closely connected environment alongside younger classmates. However, her position as the oldest and tallest student is approaching its end.

Hiromi Osawa (Masaki Okada) is a young boy from Tokyo who arrives in the village. Soyo becomes drawn to him and initially attempts to suppress her growing emotions. Over time however, she comes to acknowledge these feelings and begins to respond to them.

== Main characters ==
Soyo Migita (右田 そよ, Migita Soyo)
Hiromi Oosawa (大沢 広海, Ōsawa Hiromi)
A boy who came from Tokyo and became Soyo's first classmate. He later becomes her boyfriend. He has a very good sense of fashion.
Atsuko Yamabe (山辺 篤子, Yamabe Atsuko)
One grade younger than Soyo and her best friend. She wants to be a manga illustrator. She uses Hiromi as a model for the male character in her story.
Ibuki Taura (田浦 伊吹, Taura Ibuki)
One grade younger than Soyo and her best friend. His house is a store.
Itoko Migita (右田 以東子, Migita Itoko)
Mother of Soyo.

== Film ==
The film was shown at the 2007 Toronto International Film Festival during the Contemporary World Cinema program. It was later shown at the 28th Yokohama Film Festival that year.

Tennen Kokekkō was ranked as the 2007 Asahi Best Ten Film Festival Number 1, 2007 Japan Movie Best Ten Number 2, and as the 2007 Yokohama Film Festival Japan Movie Best Ten Number 2. Kaho had won two actress awards from this film, including the Best New Actress award.

=== Cast ===
- Kaho as Soyo Migita
- Masaki Okada as Hiromi Osawa
- Erisa Yanagi as Ibuki Taura
- Shoko Fujimura as Atsuko Yamabe
- Yui Natsukawa as Itoko Migita
- Kōichi Satō as Atsuko's Father

=== Staff ===
- Director: Nobuhiro Yamashita
- Filming: Tatsuto Kondō
- Music: Rei Harakami
- Theme song: "Kotoba wa Sankaku Kokoro wa Shikaku" by Kururi

=== Filming location ===
- Shimane Prefecture
