= Ghost Pub =

- Film poster
- Directed by: Takayoshi Watanabe
- Written by: Yōzō Tanaka
- Produced by: Hirohisa Mukuju
- Starring: Kenichi Hagiwara; Shigeru Muroi; Tomoko Yamaguchi
- Cinematography: Junichi Fujisawa
- Edited by: Akira Suzuki
- Music by: Shigeru Umebayashi
- Production companies: Kitty Films; Suntory; TV Asahi
- Release date: October 29, 1994 (Japan)
- Running time: 110 minutes
- Country: Japan
- Language: Japanese

Ghost Pub (Japanese: 居酒屋ゆうれい, Hepburn: Izakaya Yūrei) is a 1994 Japanese film directed by Takayoshi Watanabe.

== Cast ==
- Kenichi Hagiwara : Sotaro
- Shigeru Muroi : Sizuko
- Nobuo Yana : Uoharu
- Tomoko Yamaguchi : Satoko
- Etsushi Toyokawa : Sugimoto
- Hidetoshi Nishijima : Koichi

== Reception ==
19th Hochi Film Awards

- Won: Best Actor - Kenichi Hagiwara
- Won: Best Supporting Actress - Shigeru Muroi
- Won: Best Newcomer - Tomoko Yamaguchi
