= Ittoku Kishibe =

Japanese actor and musician (born 1947)

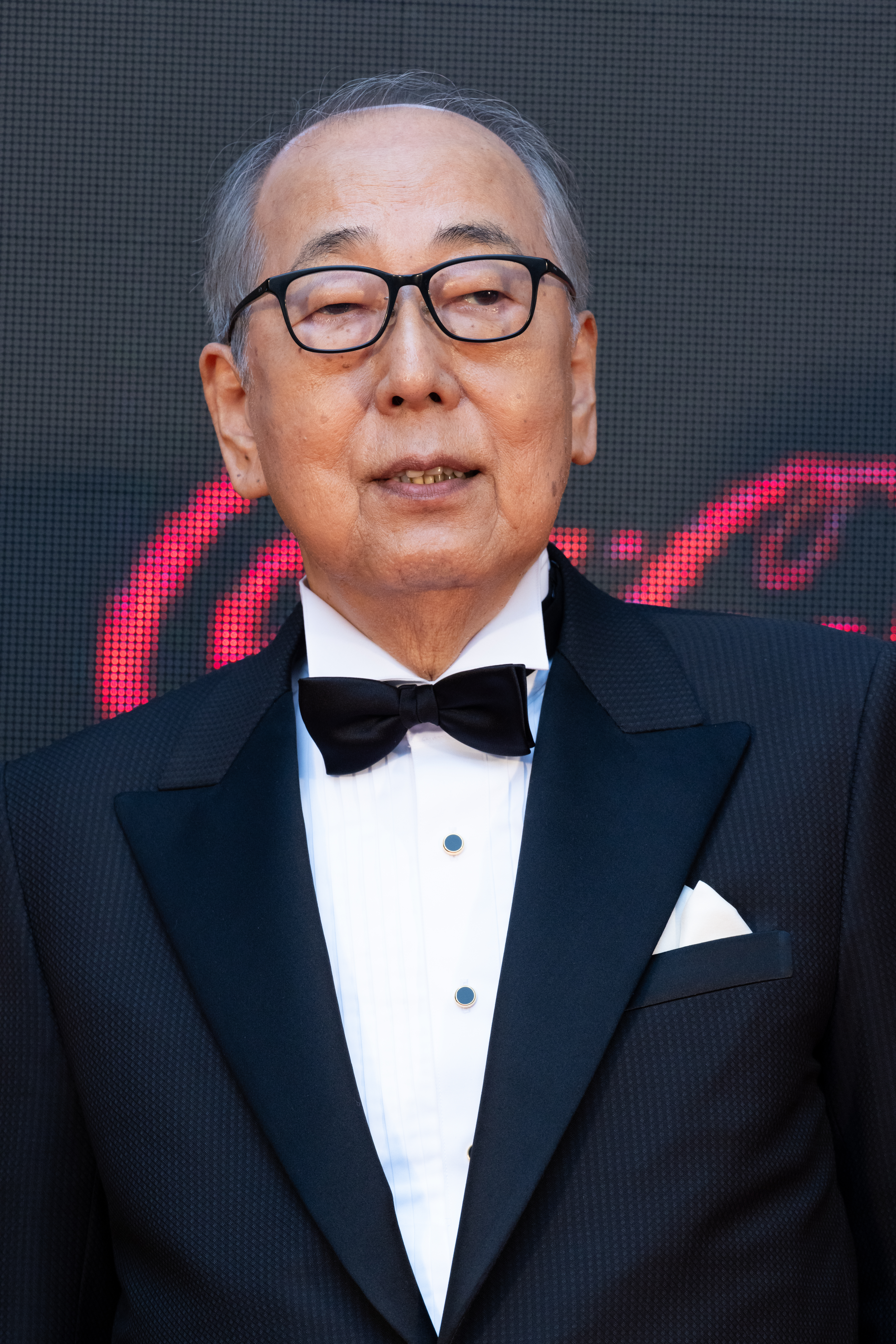
- Ittoku at the 37th Tokyo International Film Festival in 2024
- Born: Osami Kishibe; 9 January 1947 (age 79); Kyoto, Occupation of Japan
- Other names: Sally, Osami Kishibe
- Occupations: Actor, musician
- Years active: 1967–present
- Relatives: Shiro Kishibe (brother)

Ittoku Kishibe (岸部 一徳, Kishibe Ittoku; born 9 January 1947), born Osami Kishibe (岸部 修三, Kishibe Osami), is a Japanese actor and musician.

== Career ==
He originally entered show business as the bassist for the Japanese rock bands, The Tigers and Pyg, but later switched to acting. The veteran of over 115 films, he won the Best Actor Japanese Academy Award for The Sting of Death in 1991, and was nominated for the Best Supporting Actor award in 1994. He appeared in Toshiyuki Morioka's Jokyo Monogatari in 2013.

== Selected filmography ==
=== Films ===
| Year | Title | Role | Notes |
|---|---|---|---|
| 1983 | Toki o Kakeru Shōjo | Toshimi Fukushima | |
| 1984 | The Funeral | Akira | |
| 1985 | Lonely Heart | Tetsu Yoshida | |
| 1985 | Gray Sunset | Yoshikazu Ishimoto | |
| 1986 | His Motorbike, Her Island | News reporter | |
| 1986 | Final Take | Director Ogata | |
| 1987 | Tokyo Blackout | Yasuhara | |
| 1989 | Violent Cop | Nito | |
| 1990 | The Sting of Death | Toshio | |
| 1991 | Rainbow Kids | Daisaku Yanagawa | |
| 1991 | Chizuko's Younger Sister | | |
| 1993 | Rampo | Cafe owner | |
| 1993 | Kaettekita Kogarashi Monjirō | | |
| 1993 | Samurai Kids | | |
| 1996 | Sleeping Man | Chief | |
| 1999 | Shark Skin Man and Peach Hip Girl | Tanuki | |
| 1999 | Keiho | Inspector Nagoshi | |
| 2000 | Face | Eiichi Hanada | |
| 2000 | New Battles Without Honor and Humanity | Awano | |
| 2001 | Onmyoji | The Emperor | |
| 2003 | Get Up! | Kaneyama | |
| 2003 | Zatoichi | Boss Inosuke Ginzo | |
| 2004 | 69 | Matsunaga sensei | |
| 2004 | Survive Style 5+ | Tatsuya Kobayashi | |
| 2004 | Vital | Dr. Kashiwabuchi | |
| 2004 | Lady Joker | Seiichi Shirai | |
| 2005 | Itsuka dokusho suruhi | Takanashi | |
| 2005 | Aegis | | |
| 2006 | Hula Girls | Norio Yoshimoto | |
| 2006 | Waiting in the Dark | | |
| 2007 | Battery | | |
| 2007 | Hero | Kaoru Kayama | |
| 2007 | Adrift in Tokyo | Ittoku Kishibe (himself) | |
| 2008 | 10 Promises to My Dog | | |
| 2008 | Aibō The Movie | Kohken Onoda | |
| 2008 | Chameleon | | |
| 2008 | Jirocho Sangokushi | | |
| 2008 | Happy Flight | Shoji Takahashi | |
| 2008 | GS Wonderland | | |
| 2009 | Osaka Hamlet | | |
| 2009 | Asahiyama Zoo Story: Penguins in the Sky | Seinosuke Yanagihara | |
| 2009 | Nonchan Noriben | | |
| 2009 | Tsuribaka Nisshi 20: Final | | |
| 2010 | 13 Assassins | | |
| 2010 | Sword of Desperation | Tsuda | |
| 2011 | Tada's Do-It-All House | | |
| 2011 | Someday | Osamu | |
| 2012 | Tenchi: The Samurai Astronomer | | |
| 2013 | Jokyo Monogatari | | |
| 2013 | A Boy Called H | | |
| 2013 | The Backwater | Detective | |
| 2013 | Human Trust | Kazuyoshi Honjo | |
| 2014 | Lady Maiko | Orikichi Kitano | |
| 2017 | Tap The Last Show | Kiichirō Mōri | |
| 2018 | Sakura Guardian in the North | | |
| 2018 | Recall | Takeshi Kanō | |
| 2018 | Lying to Mom | Yukio Suzuki | |
| 2019 | Leaving the Scene | Detective Yanagi | |
| 2020 | I Never Shot Anyone | Kazuyuki Ishida | |
| 2021 | First Gentleman | Kurō Hara | |
| 2021 | 99.9 Criminal Lawyer: The Movie | Haruhiko Madarame | |
| 2023 | Kubi | Sen no Rikyū | |
| 2024 | Doctor-X: The Movie | Akira Kanbara | |

=== Television ===
- Ashura no Gotoku Part2 (1980)
- Kenpō wa Madaka (1996), Toshio Irie
- AIBOU: Tokyo Detective Duo (2000–2011)
- Boushi (2008)
- The Waste Land (2009), Satoi
- Doctor X (2012–2021), Akira Kanbara
- The Great White Tower (2019)
