= Face (2000 film) =

- Theatrical release poster
- Directed by: Junji Sakamoto
- Written by: Junji Sakamoto; Isamu Uno
- Produced by: Yukiko Shii
- Starring: Naomi Fujiyama; Etsushi Toyokawa; Kōichi Satō
- Cinematography: Norimichi Kasamatsu
- Edited by: Toshihide Fukano
- Music by: Yasuhiro Kobayashi
- Production companies: Eisei Gekijo; Mainichi Broadcasting System; Sedic International; Kuho
- Distributed by: Shochiku
- Release date: 12 September 2000 (Japan)
- Running time: 123 minutes
- Country: Japan
- Language: Japanese

Face (Japanese: 顔, Hepburn: Kao) is a 2000 Japanese film directed by Junji Sakamoto. At the 24th Japan Academy Prize, it won one award and received four other nominations.

== Plot ==
Sullen and withdrawn "ugly" elder sister Masako toils endlessly with mending chores in her widowed mother's dry cleaning shop, seething with hatred for her flashy younger sister Yukari, who visits only for free laundry service. When their mother dies, and Yukari persists in her abuse, Masako cracks and strangles her. She flees and takes a number of identities and odd jobs, meeting people as she goes. To her surprise, Masako finds people in general to be kind and helpful (although she's sexually abused more than once), and she blossoms as a person, even to the extent of becoming a popularly liked bar hostess like her murdered sister.

== Cast ==
- Naomi Fujiyama
- Etsushi Toyokawa
- Jun Kunimura
- Michiyo Okusu
- Riho Makise
- Shungiku Uchida
- Ai Sotome
- Misako Watanabe
- Nakamura Kanzaburō XVIII
- Ittoku Kishibe
- Kōichi Satō

== Awards and nominations ==
24th Japan Academy Prize.

- Won: Best Director - Junji Sakamoto
- Nominated: Best Picture
- Nominated: Best Screenplay - Junji Sakamoto and Isamu Uno
- Nominated: Best Actress in a Supporting Role - Michiyo Okusu
- Nominated: Best Music - Yasuhiro Kobayashi

25th Hochi Film Award

- Won: Best Film
- Won: Best Actress - Naomi Fujiyama

22nd Yokohama Film Festival

- Won: Best Film
- Won: Best Director - Junji Sakamoto
- Won: Best Screenplay - Junji Sakamoto and Isamu Uno
- Won: Best Actress - Naomi Fujiyama
