= Tokarefu =

- Theatrical release poster

Japanese name
- Kana: トカレフ
- Directed by: Junji Sakamoto
- Written by: Junji Sakamoto; Haruko Imamura
- Produced by: Yukiko Shii
- Starring: Takeshi Yamato; Yumi Nishiyama; Kōichi Satō; Masakazu Serizawa; Jun Kunimura
- Cinematography: Isao Ishii
- Edited by: Kenichi Takashima
- Music by: Shigeru Umebayashi
- Production companies: Genjiro Arato Pictures; Bandai Visual
- Release date: March 5, 1994 (Japan)
- Running time: 103 minutes
- Country: Japan
- Language: Japanese

Tokarefu (Japanese: トカレフ), also known as Tokarev, is a 1994 Japanese film directed by Junji Sakamoto.

== Cast ==
- Takeshi Yamato as Michio Nishiumi
- Yumi Nishiyama as Ayako Nishiumi
- Kōichi Satō as Kei Matsumura
- Masakazu Serizawa as Toshikazu Shimoyama
- Jun Kunimura as Detective Takahashi
- Motomi Makiguchi as Head of Kindergarten
- Hiroshi Miyasaka as Police
- Ryushi Mizukami
- Shinsuke Suzuki as Detective Wada
- Yōji Tanaka as Yakuza
- Daichi Ruike
- Ryuji Yamamoto

== Awards and nominations ==
16th Yokohama Film Festival

- Won: Best Film
- Won: Best Director – Junji Sakamoto
- Won: Best Supporting Actor – Kōichi Satō
