= KT (film) =

- Film poster
- Directed by: Junji Sakamoto
- Screenplay by: Haruhiko Arai
- Based on: Rachi by Eisuke Nakazono
- Produced by: Lee Bong-su; Yukiko Shii
- Starring: Kōichi Satō; Kim Kap-soo; Choi Il-hwa
- Cinematography: Norimichi Kasamatsu
- Edited by: Kim Hyeong-ju
- Music by: Park Ji-woong
- Distributed by: Cinequanon
- Release date: May 3, 2002
- Running time: 130 minutes
- Country: South Korea
- Languages: Korean; Japanese

KT is a 2002 Japanese-South Korean film directed by Junji Sakamoto with a screenplay by Haruhiko Arai. It is based on the 1983 novel Rachi (also known as The Abduction: The Complete Story of the Kim Dae-jung Incident) by Eisuke Nakazono, which told the story of the kidnapping of politician Kim Dae-jung by agents of military dictator Park Chung Hee in August 1973 while on a trip to Tokyo. He was released in Seoul after five days.

The title KT means Killing the Target.

== Plot ==
The story is centered on Masuo Tomita, a Japanese intelligence officer who helped arrange for South Korean agents to kidnap and try to kill Park Chung Hee's enemy Kim Dae-jung, who was in exile in Tokyo. Tomita went along with the plan to save a South Korean teacher Lee Jeong-mi, whom he loved.

== Cast ==
- Kōichi Satō ... Masuo Tomita
- Kim Kap-soo ... Kim Chang-won
- Choi Il-hwa ... Kim Dae-jung
- Yoshio Harada ... Akikazu Kamikawa
- Michitaka Tsutsui ... Kim Kap-soo
- Yang Eun-yong ... Lee Jeong-mi
- Kim Byung-se ... Kim Jung-won
- Teruyuki Kagawa ...Haruo Satake
- Akira Emoto ... Hiroshi Uchiyama
- Kyoko Enami ... Kab-Soos Mother
- Noboru Hamada ... Minister
- Masahiro Komoto
- Akaji Maro ... Susumu Kawahara
- Ken Mitsuishi ...Yu Chun-seong
- Ryūshi Mizukami
- Nana Nakamoto ... Toshiko Takashima
- Hirochi Oguchi ... Shoichi Tsukada
- Gō Rijū ... Hong Seong-jin
- Kenji Sahara... Minister
- Ken Utsui
- Hōka Kinoshita
- Akira Hamada
