= Crest of Betrayal =

1994 Japanese film by Kinji Fukasaku

- Theatrical release poster
- Directed by: Kinji Fukasaku
- Written by: Motomu Furuta; Kinji Fukasaku
- Produced by: Tetsuo Sasho; Ryuta Saito
- Starring: Kōichi Satō; Saki Takaoka; Keiko Oginome; Renji Ishibashi; Eriko Watanabe
- Cinematography: Shigeru Ishihara
- Edited by: Koichi Sonoi
- Music by: Kaoru Wada
- Production company: Shochiku
- Release date: October 22, 1994 (Japan)
- Running time: 106 minutes
- Country: Japan
- Language: Japanese

Crest of Betrayal, known in Japan as Chūshingura Gaiden: Yotsuya Kaidan (Japanese: 忠臣蔵外伝 四谷怪談; "The Treasury of Loyal Retainers Side Story: Yotsuya Ghost Story"), is a 1994 Japanese film directed by Kinji Fukasaku. Written by Motomu Furuta and Fukasaku, it combines two enduring Japanese legends; Chūshingura, which tells the story of the historical forty-seven rōnin, and Yotsuya Kaidan, a ghost story about a beautiful woman who falls victim to passion and evil.

== Plot ==
When Lord Asano draws his sword and injures Kira, he is sentenced to death by seppuku. That night rioters raid the Asano house to steal his belongings. Twenty days later, the Asano samurai meet and vow to take revenge, but Ōishi Kuranosuke makes them wait a year to see if the Asano clan can be restored through appeals. Meanwhile, he divorces his wife and sends her away to her father's house with their younger children as he whiles away his time in the companionship of geisha to lull his enemies into a sense of security. When all hope of restoring the Asano clan is lost, Ōishi gathers the men in Kyoto to prepare for their vendetta.

Tamiya Iyemon saves Oume when she is being accosted on her way to the shrine and earns the gratitude of her grandfather Ito Kihei, steward to Kira, but the Asano clan members refuse to accept his money. He then has poison sent to his wife Oiwa, claiming that it is medicine from Iyemon. The poison disfigures her face and causes her to have a miscarriage. She grabs a knife to murder Ito but accidentally stabs herself to death with it while struggling to get free from her admirer Takuetsu. When Ito confesses his actions, Iyemon agrees to marry his granddaughter Oume in return for being recommended for a position with Lord Kira. Ito introduces him to Shimizu Ichigaku, Kira's bodyguard. Iyemon returns home and kills Takuetsu, then Ito's men dispose of the bodies in the river for him.

On his wedding night, Iyemon sees a vision of Oiwa and strikes at her with his sword, killing Oume. Shimizu covers up the murder, blaming it on robbers, and promises Iyemon that he will still recommend him to Kira. In return, Iyemon agrees to assassinate Ōishi. He sneaks to Ōishi's house and announces his intention to kill Ōishi, causing Horibe and the other ronin to attack and kill him.

As a half-dead ghost, Iyemon watches as Oishi and the Asano clan raid the inn where Kira is staying. Oiwa's ghost assists them by using the power of storms to kill several of Kira's men, including the men who put her body in the river. Hazama Jujiro finds Kira's hiding spot and Ōishi instructs Jujiro to behead Kira. When he does, it severs Iyemon's ties to the world of the living and his death is complete. Iyemon's ghost and Oiwa's ghost gaze once more upon the Asano clan and the ghosts from the Ito household before wandering away.

== Cast ==
- Kōichi Satō as Tamiya Iyemon
- Saki Takaoka as Oiwa
- Keiko Oginome as Oume
- Renji Ishibashi as Kihei Ito
- Eriko Watanabe as Omaki
- Shōhei Hino as Kampei
- Naomasa Musaka as Takuetsu
- Maiko Kikuchi as Okaru
- Masaomi Kondo as Tamiya Iyori
- Keizo Kanie as Shimizu Ichigaku
- Hiroyuki Sanada as Lord Asano (special appearance)
- Takahiro Tamura as Kira (special appearance)
- Yûko Natori as Ukihashi (special appearance)
- Tsunehiko Watase as Yasubei Horibe
- Masahiko Tsugawa as Ōishi Kuranosuke

== Other Credits ==
- Art Direction by
  - Kazutoshi Marui
  - Yoshinobu Nishioka
- Sound Department
  - Koichi Hirose - sound
  - Shinichi Suzuki - sound editor
- Gaffer: Toshio Nakajima
