= Okiku and the World =

- Theatrical release poster

Japanese name
- Kana: せかいのおきく
Transcriptions
- Romanization: Sekai no Okiku
- Directed by: Junji Sakamoto
- Written by: Junji Sakamoto
- Produced by: Mitsuo Harada
- Starring: Haru Kuroki; Kanichiro; Sosuke Ikematsu; Kōichi Satō
- Cinematography: Norimichi Kasamatsu
- Release date: 28 April 2023 (Japan)
- Running time: 89 minutes
- Country: Japan
- Language: Japanese

Okiku and the World (Japanese: せかいのおきく, Hepburn: Sekai no Okiku) is a 2023 Japanese jidaigeki film directed by Junji Sakamoto.

== Plot ==
It is the Bakumatsu era and two men, Chūji and Yasuke, collect human waste in the outhouses of Edo (now Tokyo) and bring it to farms in the countryside to sell as fertilizer. One day in a rainstorm, they meet Okiku, who is the daughter of the rōnin Matsumura Genbei and who teaches children how to read and write. Chūji falls in love with her but they are of different social classes. Genbei is involved in some of the political machinations taking place during the end of the shogunate, and is killed by other samurai. Okiku tried to save him, but she herself is cut in the throat and, while surviving, loses her voice. Refusing to leave her small domicile, Okiku is finally brought out into the world by Chūji's love. She resumes teaching children, stressing the importance of the word "world".

== Cast ==
- Haru Kuroki as Okiku
- Kanichiro as Chūji
- Sosuke Ikematsu as Yasuke
- Kōichi Satō as Matsumura Genbei
- Renji Ishibashi as Magoshichi
- Claude Maki as Kijun, a priest

== Reception ==
Okiku and the World was given the Kinema Junpo Award for Best Film of the Year in 2023 in the magazine's poll of film critics. Sakamoto also won the Kinema Junpo Award for Best Screenplay. At the Mainichi Film Awards, the film won Best Picture, Best Screenplay, and Best Sound Recording.
