= Ryūichi Hiroki =

Japanese film director (born 1954)

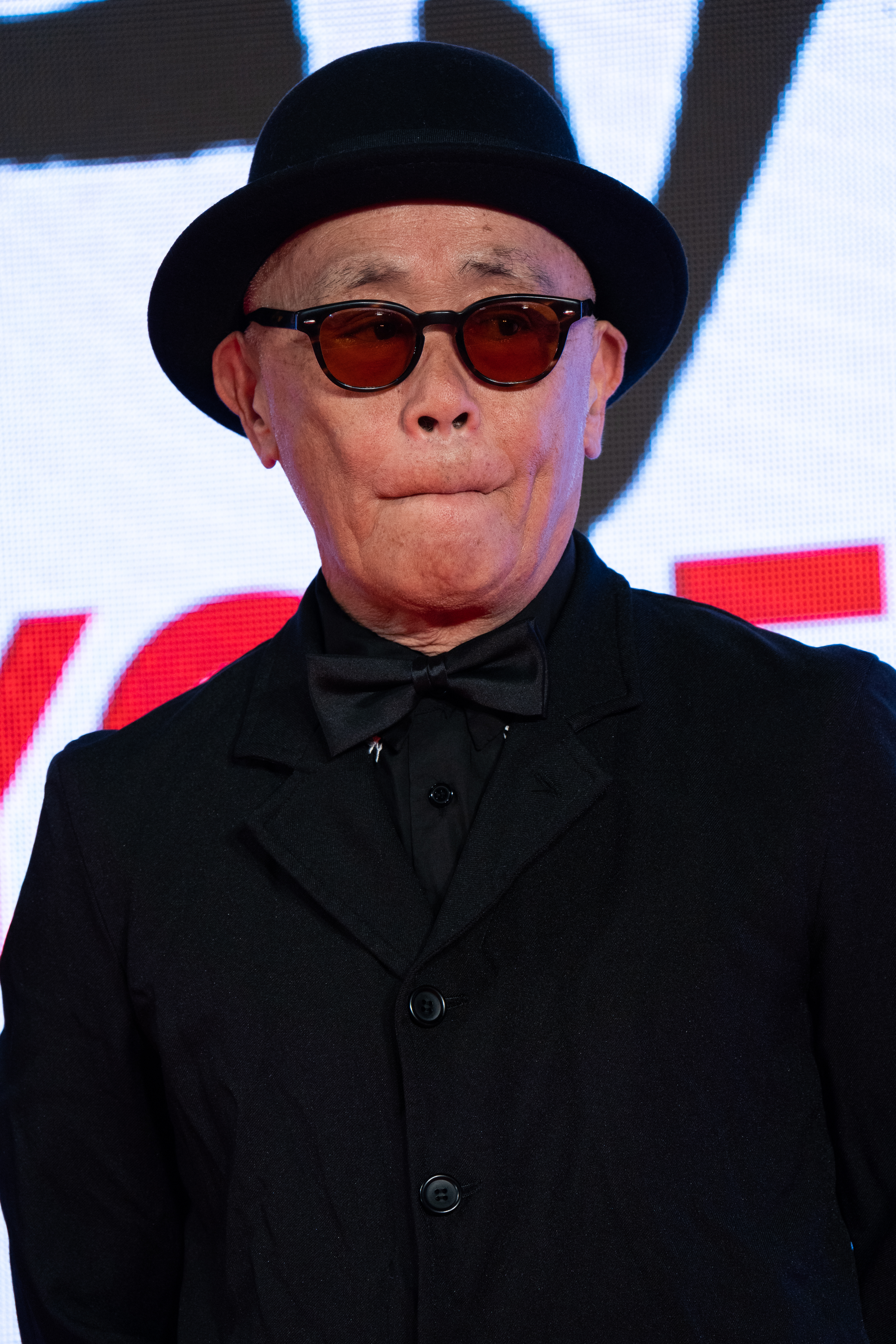
- Born: January 1, 1954 (age 72); Fukushima Prefecture, Japan
- Occupation: Film director

Ryūichi Hiroki (廣木 隆一, Hiroki Ryūichi; born January 1, 1954) is a Japanese film director. He won critical acclaim for 800 Two Lap Runners. Film critic and researcher Alexander Jacoby has described Hiroki as "one of the modern Japanese cinema's most intelligent students of character".

== Biography ==
=== Pink film ===
Hiroki is one of several Japanese film directors who got their start in the Japanese softcore pornographic film genre of pink film. He said in an interview that in the late 1970s when he wanted to get into directing, he wrote a script for a pink film and brought it to the Ōkura Eiga studio but they told him he needed to start as an assistant director. At this time he met prolific pink film director Genji Nakamura and during the next three years, Hiroki worked as an assistant director, editor, and manager for Nakamura's company Yū Pro. Hiroki made his first film as a director with Sexual Abuse! Exposed Woman for Million Film in 1982. His debut met with poor reviews and was "terrible" according to Hiroki and he went back to being an assistant director for a time.

Hiroki's next excursion into directing, beginning in November 1983, was more successful, a trio of homoerotic pink films for ENK, a new company with links to Nikkatsu, which specialized in gay pink film. Our Season, Our Generation and Our Moment were frank depictions of the tribulations of gay couples in 1980s Japan. All three films starred veteran pink film actor Tōru Nakane and Our Season, considered the best of the trio by the pink film historians Thomas and Yuko Weisser, had a screenplay by future director Rokurō Mochizuki.

The Weissers dub Hiroki "the prince of youth porn" for his 1984 film produced by Yū Pro and distributed by Nikkatsu, Teacher, Don't Turn Me On!, once again scripted by Rokurō Mochizuki and featuring Tōru Nakane as the college-age tutor of a high-school girl. His most notorious works for Nakamura's Yū Pro were a series of brutal S&M movies directed under the pseudonym Gō Ijūin (伊集院剛), which was also sometimes used by scriptwriter Hitoshi Ishikawa and Nakamura himself. According to Hiroki, using a pseudonym gave him greater freedom to describe S&M relationships in a new way. The Gō Ijūin films directed by Hiroki were the 1984 The SM, distributed by Million Film, The Sexual Abuse from February 1985 and The Sacrifice from February 1986, with the latter two films being released by Nikkatsu.

Also in 1986, Nikkatsu released Hiroki's creative but bizarrely titled Yū Pro production SM Class: Accidental Urination promoted as "New wave S&M with a sense of humor". In October 1987, Hiroki directed pioneering AV Idol Hitomi Kobayashi in the pink film The True Self of Hitomi Kobayashi released by Million Film and the next year supervised another early AV actress Eri Kikuchi in Eri Kikuchi: Huge Breasts released by Nikkatsu in January 1988.

Hiroki also ventured into the adult video (AV) world, directing for Athena Eizou, a company founded by former pink film director Tadashi Yoyogi, with titles such as the August 1989 Vanana Baby (ヴァナナベイビー) starring Mako Hyuga and the May 1990 video Nyū sekushī meitsu nukenukefinisshu dai kyōran (ＮＥＷセクシーメイツ ヌケヌケフィニッシュ大狂乱).

=== Into mainstream film ===
Although Hiroki left the pink film industry in the late 1980s, he continued to make films dealing with sexuality. Hiroki has said that he never changed his film making, but his later movies were aimed at a different audience. In May 1989 Hiroki with fellow directors Masato Ishioka and Tadafumi Tomioka founded their own production company Heaven (ヘブン).

In November 1990, Hiroki directed a romance about modern young couples in Japan, A Love Affair With Sawako for the Shochiku company. This was followed by the erotic horror V-cinema production Sadistic City which took the Japanese Film Section Grand Prize for a video at the Yubari International Fantastic Film Festival. Hiroki's breakthrough into mainstream film, however, came with his 1994 feature 800 Two Lap Runners which looked at teenage heterosexual and homosexual relationships against a track and field background. The film opened at the Berlin International Film Festival in February 1994 before being released in Japan in July 1994. It placed number 7 on the Kinema Junpo's list of the ten best Japanese movies of 1994.

Hiroki returned to his theme of the emotional and sexual lives of young adults in modern urban Japan in his June 1996 film Midori about a high-school girl pretending to be ill in order to see her boyfriend. His 2000 work Tokyo Trash Baby is an understated look at a lonely woman who goes through the garbage of the neighbor she is obsessed with looking for mementos. His other film in 2000 had a very different theme; the erotic comic drama I Am an S&M Writer, with a screenplay by Hiroki's former pink film colleague Hitoshi Ishikawa, is based on a possibly partly autobiographical novel by celebrated S&M writer Oniroku Dan.

=== Recognition ===
Hiroki's 2003 film Vibrator, based on the novel by Mari Akasaka and starring Nao Omori and Shinobu Terajima, returned to his theme of alienated women. It was described by Tom Mes as "one of the bravest and most important films of recent years." Vibrator won the Best Film award at the 25th Yokohama Film Festival in 2004 and Hiroki was named Best Director. The film was also widely seen overseas. where it won a number of awards giving Hiroki a measure of international renown.

He once again worked with actress Shinobu Terajima on the 2005 film It's Only Talk, returning to his concentration on the problems of modern city life in Japan. The film won Best Film Third Place at the 16th Japanese Professional Movie Awards (2006) and Hiroki was given a Special Award. Also during this period, Hiroki directed two character dramas with sexual themes, L'Amant about a teenaged girl selling herself as a sex slave and M, detailing the experiences of a housewife whose sexual experimentation leads to prostitution.

Later films include The Egoists, a romance film starring Kengo Kora and Anne Suzuki and River, a film which was originally inspired by the Akihabara massacre. His ensemble drama film, Kabukicho Love Hotel, screened at the 2014 Toronto International Film Festival.

== Style and influences ==
Hiroki was described by Niels Matthijs of Twitch Film as "one of the few male directors who can portray a woman with lifelike depth."

== Filmography ==
=== Feature films ===
- Sexual Abuse! Exposed Woman (性虐！女を暴く, Seigyaku! Onna o abaku) (1982)
- Our Season (ぼくらの季節, Bokura no kisetsu) (1983)
- Our Generation (ぼくらの時代, Bokura no jidai) (1983)
- Teacher, Don't Turn Me On! (先生、私の体に火をつけないで, Sensei, watashi no karada ni hi o tsukenaide) (1984)
- The SM (1984) as Gō Ijūin
- Our Moment (ぼくらの瞬間, Bokura no shunkan) (1985)
- The Sexual Abuse (ザ・折檻, Ze Sekkan) (1985) as Gō Ijūin
- The Sacrifice (ザ・生贄, Ze ikenie) (1986) as Gō Ijūin
- SM Class: Accidental Urination (ＳＭ教室 失禁, SM Kyōshitsu: Shikkin) (1986)
- The True Self of Hitomi Kobayashi (小林ひとみの本性, Kobayashi Hitomi no honshō) (1987)
- Eri Kikuchi: Huge Breasts (菊池エリ 巨乳責め, Kikuchi Eri: Kyonyūzeme) (1988)
- Male Virgin Story 4: Take Me to the Skiing童貞物語４ ボクもスキーに連れてって (Dōtei monogatari 4:Boku mo sukī ni tsuretette) (1989)
- A Love Affair With Sawako (さわこの恋 上手な嘘の恋愛講座, Sawako no koi: Jōzuna uso no ren'ai kōza) (1990)
- Sadistic City (魔王街 サディスティック・シティ, Maōgai: Sadisuchikku shitī) (1993) (V-cinema)
- Evil Dream (夢魔, Muma) (1994)
- 800 Two Lap Runners (1994)
- Forever with You (君といつまでも, Kimi to itsu made mo) (1995)
- A Love to Melt the Snow (ゲレンデがとけるほど恋したい。, Gerende ga tokeru hodo koi shitai) (1995)
- Midori (「物陰に足拍子」より ＭＩＤＯＲＩ, "Monogatari kara ashibyōshi" yori: Midori) (1996)
- The Night the Angel Turned Away (天使に見捨てられた夜, Tenshi no misuterareta yoru) (1999)
- I Am an S&M Writer (不貞の季節, Futei no kisetsu) (2000)
- Tokyo Trash Baby (東京ゴミ女, Tōkyō gomi onna) (2000)
- Labyrinth of Leg Fetishism (美脚迷路, Bikyaku meiro) (2001)
- The Barber’s Sadness (理髪店主のかなしみ, Rihatsu tenshu no kanashimi) (2002)
- Vibrator (2003)
- The Silent Big Man (2004)
- Girlfriend: Someone Please Stop the World (ガールフレンド, Gārufurendo) (2004)
- L'Amant (L'amant ラマン) (2004)
- Female (2005)
- It's Only Talk (2005)
- Love on Sunday (恋する日曜日, Koi suru nichiyōbi) (2006)
- Yokan (予感) (2006)
- M (2006)
- Bakushi (縛師 Bakushi) (2007)
- Your Friend (きみの友だち, Kimi no tomodachi) (2008)
- New Type: Just for Your Love (ニュータイプ ただ、愛のために, Nyūtaipu Tada ai no tame ni) (2008)
- April Bride (2009)
- The Lightning Tree (雷桜, Raiou) (2010)
- The Egoists (2011)
- River (2011)
- Nobody's Perfect (だいじょうぶ3組, Daijobu 3 Kumi) (2013)
- Yellow Elephant (2013)
- Crying 100 Times: Every Raindrop Falls (2013)
- Kabukicho Love Hotel (2014)
- Her Granddaughter (2014)
- Strobe Edge (2015)
- Policeman and Me (2017)
- Side Job (2017)
- The Miracles of the Namiya General Store (2017)
- Marmalade Boy (2018)
- It's Boring Here, Pick Me Up (ここは退屈迎えに来て) (2018)
- Ride or Die (2021)
- Noise (2022)
- Motherhood (2022)
- You've Got a Friend (2022)
- Phases of the Moon (2022)
- 2 Women (2022)
- The Sickness Unto Love (2025)

=== Short films ===
- Cops vs Cops (2003)

=== Television ===
- Modern Love Tokyo (2022, episode 2)
- All Lives (2024, television film)
