= Someday (2011 film) =

2011 film

- DVD cover
- Directed by: Junji Sakamoto
- Written by: Hiroshi Nobue; Junji Sakamoto
- Produced by: Kensuke Zushi; Mina Akiyama; Keiichi Shigematsu; Toru Hattori; Koushi Uchida; Hiroshi Furukawa; Yukiko Shii
- Starring: Yoshio Harada; Michiyo Okusu; Ittoku Kishibe
- Cinematography: Norimichi Kasamatsu
- Edited by: Ryo Hayano
- Music by: Goro Yasukawa
- Release date: 16 July 2011 (Japan)
- Running time: 93 minutes
- Country: Japan
- Language: Japanese

Someday (Japanese: 大鹿村騒動記, Hepburn: Ōshika-mura sōdōki) is a 2011 Japanese drama film directed by Junji Sakamoto.

== Cast ==
- Yoshio Harada as Yoshi Kazamatsuri
- Michiyo Okusu as Takako Kazamatsuri
- Ittoku Kishibe as Muchira No
- Kōichi Satō as Ippei Koshida
- Takako Matsu as Mie Oi
- Satoshi Tomiura as Daiji Raion
- Eita as Kanji Shibayama
- Renji Ishibashi as Kensan Shigetake
