= A Dedicated Life =

- DVD cover
- Kanji: 全身小説家
- Revised Hepburn: Zenshin shōsetsuka
- Directed by: Kazuo Hara
- Produced by: Sachiko Kobayashi
- Cinematography: Kazuo Hara
- Edited by: Jun Nabeshima
- Music by: Takashi Sekiguchi
- Production company: Sprint Production (Kazuo Hara)
- Distributed by: Sprint Production; Euro Space
- Release date: 23 September 1994 (Japan)
- Running time: 157 minutes (Note: A variety of lengths is given for the film's running time, depending on the source. The Internet Movie Database lists 157 minutes, which complies with the length of the Japanese DVD video release.)
- Country: Japan
- Language: Japanese

A Dedicated Life (Japanese: 全身小説家, Hepburn: Zenshin shōsetsuka; lit. A Wholehearted Writer) is a 1994 Japanese documentary and docudrama film directed by Kazuo Hara about writer Mitsuharu Inoue. It shows the last four years of Inoue's life while fighting cancer, and tries to capture his character and the influence he had on the people around him.

== Synopsis ==
Filming Inoue both at public appearances and in private, and interviewing fellow writers like Yutaka Haniya as well as former pupils of Inoue's literary training centers, some of which speak frankly about their affair with their married teacher, Kazuo Hara draws a portrait of a multi-faceted personality: socially committed and egotistical, extroverted and hiding behind a persona.

Additionally, the film contains scenes which re-enact Inoue's childhood and youth according to his own accounts, which are partially put into question by statements from relatives.

== Cast ==
- Mitsuharu Inoue
- Yutaka Haniya
- Jakuchō Setouchi
- Hiroshi Noma
- Ikuko Inoue
- Kim Gumija as Mother Takako
- Yoshie Yamamoto as Grandmother Saka
- Haruhi Iso as Choi Tsuruyo
- Masayuki Kubota as Mitsuharu as youth
- Hiroya Sugiyama as Mitsuharu as child

== Production ==
Early into the film's production, Inoue was diagnosed with liver metastasis, underwent an operation (which is shown in detail) and continued his work as a writer and teacher. He died in May 1992.

== Reception ==
Upon the film's presentation at the Forum section of the 1995 Berlin International Film Festival, critic David Stratton, writing for Variety magazine, called A Dedicated Life "riveting viewing, and, in the end, extremely moving", and "a demanding, but most impressive, film portrait".

== Awards ==
- 19th Hochi Film Award for Best Film
- 49th Mainichi Film Award for Best Film
- 68th Kinema Junpo Award for Best Film
- 18th Japan Academy Film Prize – Special Award for Kazuo Hara
