= Junji Sakamoto =

Japanese film director (born 1958)

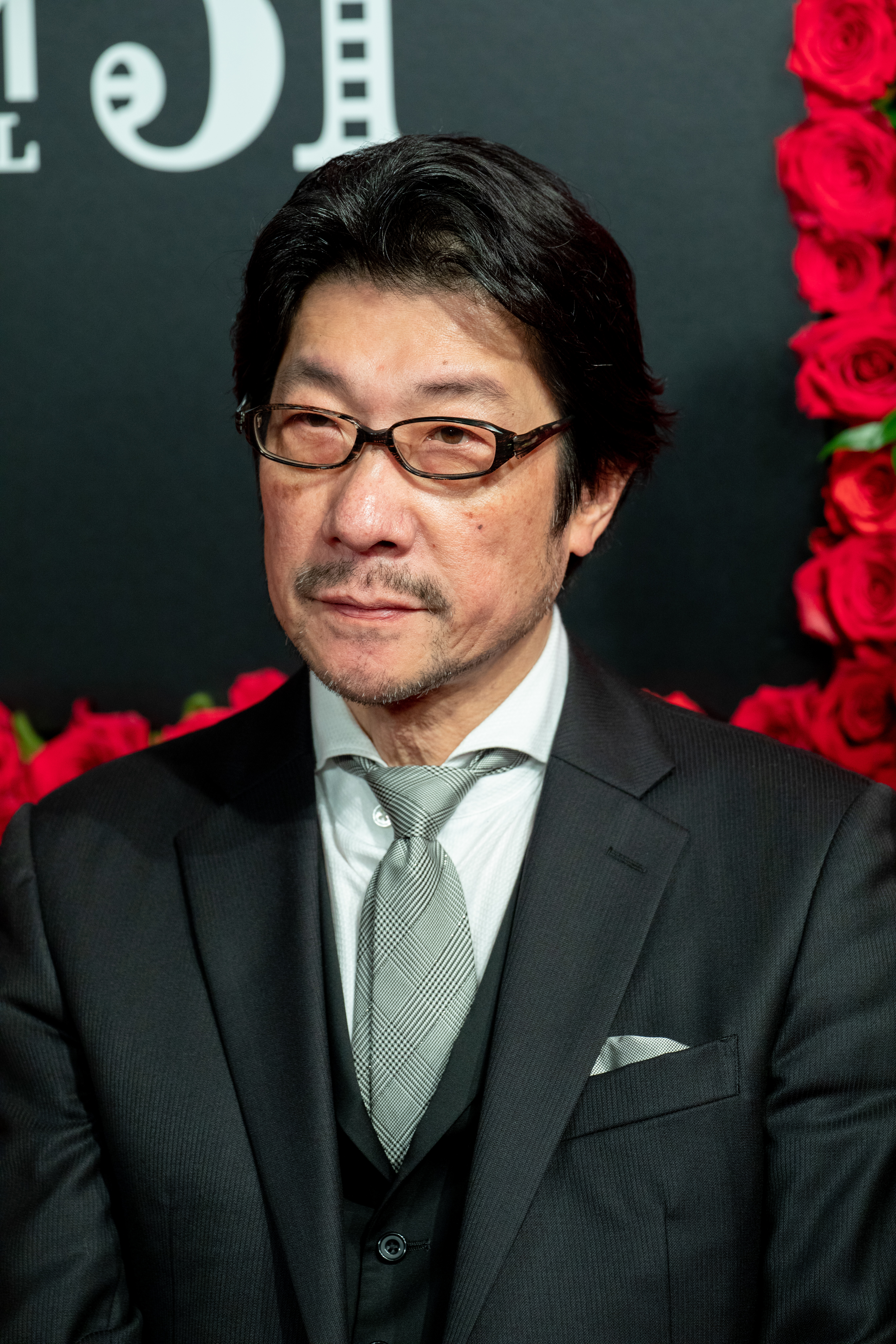
- Junji Sakamoto at the 2018 Tokyo International Film Festival
- Born: January 1, 1958 (age 68); Sakai, Osaka, Japan
- Occupation: Film director
- Years active: 1989–present

Junji Sakamoto (阪本 順治, Sakamoto Junji; born October 1, 1958 in Sakai, Osaka) is a Japanese film director.

== Career ==
After working as a set assistant or assistant director under such filmmakers as Sogo Ishii and Kazuyuki Izutsu, he made his directorial debut in 1989 with Dotsuitarunen (earning the Directors Guild of Japan New Directors Award) and followed it up with another boxing film, Tekken, in 1990. Sakamoto became known for action films focusing on the conflicts between male characters, such as Tokarefu and New Battles Without Honor and Humanity, but has also made films centered on female characters such as Face and Awakening. He won the award for Best Director at the 24th Japan Academy Prize and at the 22nd Yokohama Film Festival for Face. He won the Special Jury prize for My House at the Las Palmas de Gran Canaria International Film Festival in 2003.

Chameleon, an action film starring Tatsuya Fujiwara and Asami Mizukawa, screened at the Busan International Film Festival in 2008. Children of the Dark, a thriller film shot in Thailand, was denied to screen at the Bangkok International Film Festival in 2008. Zatoichi: The Last, a jidaigeki film starring Shingo Katori, and Strangers in the City, a thriller film starring Toru Nakamura and Manami Konishi, were both released in 2010. Someday, an ensemble comedy film starring Yoshio Harada, won the Best Picture prize at the Yokohama Film Festival in 2011. He also directed A Chorus of Angels, a 2012 film starring Sayuri Yoshinaga, to commemorate the 60th anniversary of Toei Company. His 2013 film, Human Trust, starred Kōichi Satō, Yoo Ji-tae, and Vincent Gallo.

== Style and influences ==
A number of Sakamoto's works, such as Ōte and Biriken, are set in Osaka, particularly the Shinsekai sector. His films have also taken up such controversial topics as postwar Japanese history and the problem of national sovereignty (Out of This World or Aegis), or the trafficking of children in Asia (Children of the Dark).

== Filmography ==
- Dotsuitarunen (1989)
- Tekken (1990)
- Ōte (1991)
- Tokarefu (1994)
- Boxer Joe (1995)
- Biriken (1996)
- Scarred Angels (1997)
- The Goofball (1998)
- Face (2000)
- New Battles Without Honor and Humanity (2000)
- KT (2002)
- My House (2003)
- Out of This World (2004)
- Aegis (2005)
- Awakening (2007)
- Chameleon (2008)
- Children of the Dark (2008)
- Zatoichi: The Last (2010)
- Strangers in the City (2010)
- Someday (2011)
- A Chorus of Angels (2012)
- Human Trust (2013)
- Joe, Tomorrow (2015)
- The Projects (2016)
- Ernesto (2017)
- Another World (2019)
- I Never Shot Anyone (2020)
- My Brother, The Android and Me (2022)
- A Winter Rose (2022)
- Okiku and the World (2023)
- Climbing for Life (2025)

== Honors ==
- In 2023, Sakamoto was honoured by New York Asian Film Festival with a Lifetime Achievement Award.
- Medal with Purple Ribbon (2025)
