= 29th Japan Film Professional Awards =

Japanese film awards

- Date: 2020

The 29th Japan Film Professional Awards (Japanese: 第29回日本映画プロフェッショナル大賞, Hepburn: Dai 29-kai Nihon Eiga Purofesshonaru Taishō) was the 29th edition of the Japan Film Professional Awards. In addition to ranking the best films of 2019, ten films were selected as the best of the decade (2010-2019). An award ceremony did not take place. Unlike previous years, no acting awards were given.

== Awards ==
- Best Film of 2019: Miyamoto
- Best Film of the 2010s: Happy Hour
- Movie MVP of the 2010s: Ryusuke Hamaguchi (Happy Hour, Asako I & II, Intimacies)

== 10 best films of 2019 ==
1. Miyamoto (Tetsuya Mariko)
2. A Girl Missing (Koji Fukada)
3. Siblings of the Cape (Shinzо̄ Katayama)
4. Just Only Love (Rikiya Imaizumi)
5. Farewell Song (Akihiko Shiota)
6. Another World (Junji Sakamoto)
7. Randen: The Comings and Goings on a Kyoto Tram (Takuji Suzuki)
8. One Night (Kazuya Shiraishi)
9. To the Ends of the Earth (Kiyoshi Kurosawa)
10. Melancholic (Seiji Tanaka)

== 10 best films of the 2010s ==
1. Happy Hour (Ryusuke Hamaguchi)
2. Heaven's Story (Takahisa Zeze)
3. Saudade (Katsuya Tomita)
4. 100 Yen Love (Masaharu Take)
4. Harmonium (Koji Fukada)
5. Three Stories of Love (Ryōsuke Hashiguchi)
6. Asako I & II (Ryusuke Hamaguchi)
7. Tremble All You Want (Akiko Ōku)
8. The Story of Yonosuke (Shūichi Okita)
9. Cold Fish (Sion Sono)
