= 8th Japan Film Professional Awards =

Japanese film awards in 1999

- Date: April 17, 1999
- Site: Theatre Shinjuku, Tokyo, Japan

The 8th Japan Film Professional Awards (第8回日本映画プロフェッショナル大賞) is the 8th edition of the Japan Film Professional Awards. It awarded the best of 1998 in film. The ceremony took place on April 17, 1999, at Theatre Shinjuku in Tokyo.

== Awards ==
- Best Film: Serpent's Path
- Best Director: Itsumichi Isomura (Give It All)
- Best Actress: Rena Tanaka (Give It All)
- Best Actor: Show Aikawa (Serpent's Path, Kumo no Hitomi)
- Best Supporting Actor: Kazuma Suzuki (Orokamono: Kizu Darake no Tenshi)
- Best New Encouragement: Seiichi Tanabe (Blues Harp)
- Best New Encouragement: Hinano Yoshikawa (Tokyo Eyes)
- Best New Director: Yoshimasa Ishibashi (Kuruwasetaino)
- Special: Kameari Meigaza (The theatre used to play softcore pornographic films called Roman porno. It closed in 1999.)

== 10 best films ==
1. Serpent's Path (Kiyoshi Kurosawa)
2. Give It All (Itsumichi Isomura)
3. Love & Pop (Hideaki Anno)
4. Wait and See (Shinji Sōmai)
5. Orokamono: Kizu Darake no Tenshi (Junji Sakamoto)
6. The Bird People in China (Takashi Miike)
7. Tokyo Eyes (Jean-Pierre Limosin)
7. Murder on D Street (Akio Jissoji)
9. Neji Shiki (Teruo Ishii)
10. Kumo no Hitomi (Kiyoshi Kurosawa)
10. Kuruwasetaino (Yoshimasa Ishibashi)
