= 20th Japan Film Professional Awards =

Japanese film awards in 2011

- Date: May 31, 2011
- Site: Theatre Shinjuku, Tokyo, Japan

The 20th Japan Film Professional Awards (第20回日本映画プロフェッショナル大賞) was the 20th edition of the Japan Film Professional Awards. Films of 2010 which had not already won a major domestic film award were eligible. Instead of an award ceremony, a charity event for the film Keibetsu was held to commemorate the 20th edition. A preview screening of the film took place on May 31, 2011, at Kadokawa Cinema Shinjuku.

== Awards ==
- Best Film: Sawako Decides
- Best Director: Takahisa Zeze (Heaven's Story)
- Best Actress: Yuki Uchida (Bakamono)
- Best Actor: Sousuke Takaoka (Sankaku)
- Best New Director: Tetsuya Mariko (Yellow Kid)
- Best New Encouragement: Kengo Kora (Kenta to Jun to Kayochan no Kuni)
- Best New Encouragement: Kiko Mizuhara (Norwegian Wood)
- Special: Mitsuru Kurosawa (For his longtime work.)

== 10 best films ==
1. Sawako Decides (Yuya Ishii)
2. Heaven's Story (Takahisa Zeze)
3. The Hero Show (Kazuyuki Izutsu)
4. GeGeGe no Nyōbō (Takuji Suzuki)
5. Haru's Journey (Masahiro Kobayashi)
6. Yellow Kid (Tetsuya Mariko)
7. Kenta to Jun to Kayochan no Kuni (Tatsushi Ōmori)
8. Sketches of Kaitan City (Kazuyoshi Kumakiri)
9. Outrage (Takeshi Kitano)
10. Colorful (Keiichi Hara)
