= 28th Japan Film Professional Awards =

Japanese film awards

- Date: 2019

The 28th Japan Film Professional Awards (Japanese: 第28回日本映画プロフェッショナル大賞, Hepburn: Dai 28-kai Nihon Eiga Purofesshonaru Taishō) was the 28th edition of the Japan Film Professional Awards. It awarded the best of 2018 in film. An award ceremony did not take place.

== Awards ==
- Best Film: And Your Bird Can Sing
- Best Director: Ryusuke Hamaguchi (Asako I & II)
- Best Actress: Shuri (Love at Least)
- Best Actor: Ren Osugi (The Chaplain)
- Emerging Director: Kōsai Sekine (Love at Least, Tower of the Sun)
- Special: Yūrakuchō Subaru-za
- Audience: Love at Least (Selected by crowdfunding participants from the previous year.)

== 10 best films ==
1. And Your Bird Can Sing (Sho Miyake)
2. Asako I & II (Ryusuke Hamaguchi)
3. Dynamite Graffiti (Masanori Tominaga)
4. Dare to Stop Us (Kazuya Shiraishi)
5. The Chaplain (Dai Sakō)
6. Love at Least (Kōsai Sekine)
7. The Chrysanthemum and the Guillotine (Takahisa Zeze)
8. Come On Irene (Keisuke Yoshida)
9. Every Day a Good Day (Tatsushi Ōmori)
10. Punk Samurai Slash Down (Gakuryū Ishii)
