= The World Is Mine (manga) =

Japanese manga series

- First tankōbon volume cover

ザ・ワールド・イズ・マイン (Za Wārudo izu Main)
- Manga
- Written by: Hideki Arai
- Published by: Shogakukan
- Magazine: Weekly Young Sunday
- Original run: 1997 – 2001
- Volumes: 14
- icon

The World Is Mine (Japanese: ザ・ワールド・イズ・マイン, Hepburn: Za Wārudo izu Main) is a Japanese manga series written and illustrated by Hideki Arai. It was serialized in Shogakukan's seinen manga magazine Weekly Young Sunday from 1997 to 2001, with its chapters collected in fourteen tankōbon volumes.

== Plot ==
Two fugitives, Mon and Toshiya "Toshi" Misumi, travel north through Japan while planting improvised fire extinguisher bombs. After Toshi's arrest in Aomori Prefecture, Mon launches a violent assault on a police station to free him, establishing their infamy as domestic terrorists. Meanwhile, a mysterious beast known as Higumadon crosses the Tsugaru Strait and emerges on Honshu. The creature attracts the attention of Takeru Iijima, a hunter once renowned as superhuman, while journalist Takayuki Hoshino follows the unfolding events.

Japanese authorities struggle to contain Mon and Toshi's escalating attacks, while the government and military face international scrutiny over whether to destroy or preserve Higumadon. As these crises unfold, countless lives are disrupted by the actions of both the terrorists and the beast.

== Publication ==
Written and illustrated by Hideki Arai, The World Is Mine was serialized in Shogakukan's seinen manga magazine Weekly Young Sunday from 1997 to 2001. Shogakukan collected its chapters in fourteen tankōbon volumes, released from June 5, 1997, to May 1, 2001. Enterbrain republished the manga in a five-volume revised edition, "Shinsetsu The World Is Mine" (真説 ザ・ワールド・イズ・マイン), from August 31 to October 25, 2006.

== Reception ==
The manga was a finalist for the fourth and sixth installments of the Tezuka Osamu Cultural Prize in 2000 and 2002, respectively.

Tomo Machiyama of Pulp included the series on the "Most Hellish (Untranslated) Manga....ever!!!" list. Machiyama described the series as "A Clockwork Orange meets Natural Born Killers". Machiyama said that the story "sounds really stupid and meaningless", but that it is "meticulously rendered in detailed super-realism", highlighting its art. Machiyama concluded: "To get through this comic is a challenge to your humanity."

== Legacy ==
Manga author Tatsuki Fujimoto commented the influence that Arai's The World Is Mine and Kiichi!! had on his manga series Fire Punch. Film director Tetsuya Mariko said that the manga influenced him for the 2016 film Destruction Babies.
