= Boys Be Ambitious =

- DVD cover

Japanese name
- Kanji: 岸和田少年愚連隊 Boys Be Ambitious
Transcriptions
- Revised Hepburn: Kishiwada shōnen gurentai
- Directed by: Kazuyuki Izutsu
- Screenplay by: Wui-Sin Chong; Masayoshi Azuma
- Based on: Kishiwada shōnen gurentai by Riichi Nakaba
- Starring: Hiroyuki Yabe; Takashi Okamura; Nanako Okochi; Hiroyuki Miyasako; Houka Kinoshita
- Cinematography: Takeshi Hamada
- Release date: March 16, 1996 (Japan)
- Running time: 105 minutes
- Country: Japan
- Language: Japanese

Boys Be Ambitious (Japanese: 岸和田少年愚連隊 BOYS BE AMBITIOUS, Hepburn: Kishiwada shōnen gurentai) is a 1996 Japanese film directed by Kazuyuki Izutsu. The film is based on the autobiographical novel Kishiwada shōnen gurentai by Riichi Nakaba, and stars Takashi Okamura and Hiroyuki Yabe of the comedy duo Ninety-nine. It was followed by the sequel Young Thugs: Innocent Blood (1997) and the prequel Young Thugs: Nostalgia (1998).

== Cast ==
- Hiroyuki Yabe
- Takashi Okamura
- Nanako Okochi
- Hiroyuki Miyasako
- Houka Kinoshita
- Ren Osugi

== Awards ==
39th Blue Ribbon Awards

- Won: Best Film
