= Kiichi!! =

Japanese manga series

- First tankōbon volume cover, featuring Kiichi Someya

キーチ!!
- Manga
- Written by: Hideki Arai
- Published by: Shogakukan
- Magazine: Big Comic Superior
- Original run: July 27, 2001 – February 24, 2006
- Volumes: 9
- Manga

Kiichi VS
- Written by: Hideki Arai
- Published by: Shogakukan
- Magazine: Big Comic Superior
- Original run: August 10, 2007 – July 12, 2013
- Volumes: 11
- icon

Kiichi!! (キーチ!!) is a Japanese manga series written and illustrated by Hideki Arai. It was serialized in Shogakukan's seinen manga magazine Big Comic Superior from July 2001 to February 2006, with its chapters collected in nine tankōbon volumes. It follows the story of Kiichi Someya, from his childhood through to adulthood. A sequel, titled Kiichi VS, was serialized in the same magazine from August 2007 to July 2013, with its chapters collected in eleven tankōbon volumes.

== Plot ==
Kiichi Someya (染谷輝一, Someya Kiichi) was raised by his parents to be free and honest. This led to him developing a violent temper and being prone to outbursts whenever he was displeased. His aggression frequently causes problems at kindergarten, though his parents attribute his behavior to strong personal conviction and never scold him harshly, instead raising him with affection. One day, however, Kiichi witnesses his parents murdered before his eyes by a random assailant—an event that drastically alters his life. Following the incident, Kiichi disappears and ends up living among the homeless. After a period spent alone in the mountains and eventually being taken into protective custody, he learns the importance of surviving on his own. By the time he reaches elementary school, a bullied classmate named Misato Saji (佐治 みさと, Saji Misato) confides in him that her father is forcing her into child prostitution. Together with his classmate Keiichiro Kai (甲斐 慶一郎, Kai Keiichirō), Kiichi becomes deeply involved in this case, which concerns powerful figures.

Ten years later, Kiichi co-founds an nonprofit organization with Keiichiro, the Kiichi's Company (キーチズ・カンパニー), advocating the motto "Be honest" and carrying out various forms of aid work. His popularity and influence grow so great that they surpass even those of the sitting prime minister. Gradually, however, Kiichi and Kai grow apart. Following a decision to support Kurita Refrigeration (栗田冷蔵, Kurita Reizō), a company brought to the brink by a scandal involving fraudulent labeling of imported beef, Kiichi breaks ties with the company. Kiichi eventually meets the murderous terrorist group known as the Haramita Theater Troupe (劇団波羅蜜多, Gekidan Haramita). There, he falls in love with the group's leader, Aya Tanaka (田中 あや, Tanaka Aya). Driven solely by his feelings for her, Kiichi takes over the group and commits shocking acts.

== Publication ==
Written and illustrated by Hideki Arai, Kiichi!! was serialized in Shogakukan's seinen manga magazine Big Comic Superior from July 27, 2001, to February 24, 2006. (Note: It started in the magazine's 16th issue of 2001, released on July 27 of that same year; it finished in the magazine's sixth issue of 2006, released on February 24 of that same year.) Shogakukan collected its chapters in nine tankōbon volumes, released from January 30, 2002, to May 30, 2006.

A sequel to the series, titled Kiichi VS (キーチVS), was serialized in Big Comic Superior from August 10, 2007, to July 12, 2013. Shogakukan collected its chapters in eleven tankōbon volumes, released from April 26, 2008, to August 30, 2013.

=== Kiichi!! ===
No.	Japanese release date	Japanese ISBN
1	January 30, 2002	978-4-09-186061-3
2	July 30, 2002	978-4-09-186062-0
3	February 28, 2003	978-4-09-186063-7
4	July 30, 2003	978-4-09-186064-4
5	June 30, 2004	978-4-09-186065-1
6	July 30, 2004	978-4-09-186066-8
7	June 30, 2006	978-4-09-186067-5
8	February 28, 2006	978-4-09-186068-2
9	May 30, 2006	978-4-09-180380-1

=== Kiichi VS ===
No.	Japanese release date	Japanese ISBN
1	April 26, 2008	978-4-09-181868-3
2	October 30, 2008	978-4-09-182206-2
3	April 30, 2009	978-4-09-182480-6
4	October 30, 2009	978-4-09-182756-2
5	April 28, 2010	978-4-09-183147-7
6	November 30, 2010	978-4-09-183412-6
7	July 29, 2011	978-4-09-183832-2
8	January 30, 2012	978-4-09-184195-7
9	June 29, 2012	978-4-09-184529-0
10	January 30, 2013	978-4-09-184863-5
11	August 30, 2013	978-4-09-185397-4

== Legacy ==
Manga author Tatsuki Fujimoto commented the influence that Arai's Kiichi!! and The World Is Mine had on his manga series Fire Punch.
