= 6th Japan Film Professional Awards =

Japanese film awards in 1997

- Date: April 12, 1997
- Site: Theatre Shinjuku, Tokyo, Japan

The 6th Japan Film Professional Awards (第6回日本映画プロフェッショナル大賞) is the 6th edition of the Japan Film Professional Awards. It awarded the best of 1996 in film. The ceremony took place on April 12, 1997, at Theatre Shinjuku in Tokyo.

== Awards ==
- Best Film: Helpless
- Best Director: Takeshi Kitano (Kids Return)
- Best Actress: Maiko Kawakami (Debeso)
- Best Actor: Tadanobu Asano (Helpless, Focus)
- Best New Director: Shinji Aoyama (Helpless, Chinpira)
- Special: Tatsuoki Hosono (Shabu Gokudō)
- Best Distinguished Service: Tomorowo Taguchi (Midori, Dangan Runner)
- Best Distinguished Service: Mai Kitajima (Gonin 2)

== 10 best films ==
1. Helpless (Shinji Aoyama)
2. Kids Return (Takeshi Kitano)
3. Young Thugs: Innocent Blood (Kazuyuki Izutsu)
4. Shabu Gokudō (Tatsuoki Hosono)
5. Don't Look Up (Hideo Nakata)
6. Okaeri (Makoto Shinozaki)
7. Romance (Shunichi Nagasaki)
8. Gonin 2 (Takashi Ishii)
9. Biriken (Junji Sakamoto)
9. Focus (Satoshi Isaka)
9. Midori (Ryūichi Hiroki)
