= 7th Japan Film Professional Awards =

Japanese film awards in 1998

- Date: March 28, 1998
- Site: Theatre Shinjuku, Tokyo, Japan

The 7th Japan Film Professional Awards (第7回日本映画プロフェッショナル大賞) is the 7th edition of the Japan Film Professional Awards. It awarded the best of 1997 in film. The ceremony took place on March 28, 1998, at Theatre Shinjuku in Tokyo.

== Awards ==
- Best Film: Cure
- Best Director: Takashi Miike (Rainy Dog, Young Thugs: Innocent Blood)
- Best Actress: Naomi Nishida (My Secret Cache)
- Best Actor: Yoshio Harada (Onibi)
- Best Supporting Actor: Masato Hagiwara (Cure)
- Best New Encouragement: Sarina Suzuki (Young Thugs: Innocent Blood)
- Best New Encouragement: Maki Sakai (Gozonji! Fundoshi Zukin)
- Best New Encouragement: Yasue Sato (Bounce Ko Gals)
- Special: Kazuyoshi Okuyama (For his achievements as a producer.)

== 10 best films ==
1. Cure (Kiyoshi Kurosawa)
2. A Yakuza in Love (Rokurō Mochizuki)
3. Postman Blues (Sabu)
4. Onibi (Rokurō Mochizuki)
5. Young Thugs: Innocent Blood (Takashi Miike)
6. Unagi (Shohei Imamura)
7. Tetsu to Namari (Kazuhiro Kiuchi)
8. 2/Duo (Nobuhiro Suwa)
9. Raigyo (Takahisa Zeze)
10. Tettō Musashino-sen (Naoki Nagao)
