= 4th Japan Film Professional Awards =

Japanese film awards in 1995

- Date: April 15, 1995
- Site: Theatre Shinjuku, Tokyo, Japan

The 4th Japan Film Professional Awards (第4回日本映画プロフェッショナル大賞) is the 4th edition of the Japan Film Professional Awards. It awarded the best of 1994 in film. The ceremony took place on April 15, 1995, at Theatre Shinjuku in Tokyo.

== Awards ==
- Best Film: Kyōjū Luger P08
- Best Director: Takeshi Watanabe (Kyōjū Luger P08, Goku Tsubushi)
- Best Actress: Sawa Suzuki (Ai no Shinsekai)
- Best Actor: Etsushi Toyokawa (Undo, Angel Dust)
- Best New Director: Shunji Iwai (Undo)
- Special: Hiroshi Abe (Kyōjū Luger P08, Ōsaka Gokudō Sensō Shinoidare)
- Special: Eriko Watanabe (Crest of Betrayal, Kowagaru Hitobito)
- Best New Encouragement: Isao Ishii (For filming Tokarev.)

== 10 best films ==
1. Kyōjū Luger P08 (Takeshi Watanabe)
2. Nobody (Toshimichi Ōkawa)
3. Undo (Shunji Iwai)
4. Totsuzen Honō no Gotoku (Kazuyuki Izutsu)
5. Shoot! (Kazuki Ōmori)
6. Ai no Shinsekai (Banmei Takahashi)
7. Yoru ga Mata Kuru (Takashi Ishii)
8. Koi no Tasogare (Takayoshi Yamaguchi)
9. Watcher in the Attic (Akio Jissoji)
10. Ōsaka Gokudō Sensō Shinoidare (Tatsuoki Hosono)
10. The Dream of Garuda (Takahisa Zeze)
