= The World Is Mine =

The World Is Mine or World Is Mine may refer to:

- The World Is Mine (manga), 1997
- "The World Is Mine" (Ice Cube song), 1997
- "The World Is Mine" (Cracker song), 1998
- "The World Is Mine" (Hooverphonic song), 2002
- "The World Is Mine" (David Guetta song), 2004
- The World Is Mine, a 2002 album by Quruli
- "The World Is Mine", a 2006 song by Kevin Federline from Playing with Fire (Kevin Federline album)
- "World Is Mine", a song written by ryo and performed by Hatsune Miku, from Supercell, 2008
- "World Is Mine", a song by ASAP Ferg featuring Big Sean, from Always Strive and Prosper, 2016
