= 31st Japan Film Professional Awards =

Japanese film awards in 2022

- Date: 2022

The 31st Japan Film Professional Awards (Japanese: 第31回日本映画プロフェッショナル大賞, Hepburn: Dai 31-kai Nihon Eiga Purofesshonaru Taishō) was the 31st edition of the Japan Film Professional Awards. It awarded the best of 2021 in film. An award ceremony did not take place.

== Awards ==
- Best Film: Wheel of Fortune and Fantasy
- Best Director: Yujiro Harumoto (A Balance)
- Best Actress: Kumi Takiuchi (A Balance)
- Best Actor: Ryo Narita (You're Not Normal, Either!)
- Emerging Director: Sōshi Matsumoto (It's a Summer Film)
- Special: Nobuhiro Doi (We Made a Beautiful Bouquet)
- Special: Cinema Iris (For many years of achievements.)
- Special Achievement: Shinichiro Sawai (For his many years of achievements as a film director.)

== 10 best films ==
1. Wheel of Fortune and Fantasy (Ryusuke Hamaguchi)
2. A Balance (Yujiro Harumoto)
3. Aristocrats (Yukiko Sode)
4. Ito (Satoko Yokohama)
5. Under the Open Sky (Miwa Nishikawa)
6. A Madder Red (Yuya Ishii)
7. Intolerance (Keisuke Yoshida)
8. We Made a Beautiful Bouquet (Nobuhiro Doi)
8. The Sound of Grass (Saitō Hisashi)
9. Blue (Keisuke Yoshida)
