= 19th Japan Film Professional Awards =

Japanese film awards in 2010

- Date: May 15, 2010
- Site: Shin-Bungeiza, Tokyo, Japan

The 19th Japan Film Professional Awards (第19回日本映画プロフェッショナル大賞) is the 19th edition of the Japan Film Professional Awards. Films of 2009 which had not already won a major domestic film award were eligible. The ceremony took place on May 15, 2010, at Shin-Bungeiza in Tokyo. In addition to the usual categories, five films were selected for best films of the "Zero era" (Released from 2000 to 2009).

== Awards ==
- Best Film: I'm a Cat Stalker
- Best Director: Mamoru Hosoda (Summer Wars)
- Best Actress: Bae Doona (Air Doll)
- Best Actor: Shun Sugata (Confessions of a Dog)
- Best New Director: Takuji Suzuki (I'm a Cat Stalker)
- Best New Encouragement: Hikari Mitsushima (Pride)
- Best New Encouragement: Marie Machida (Miyoko Asagaya Kibun)

== 10 best films ==
1. Watashi wa Neko Stalker (Takuji Suzuki)
2. Summer Wars (Mamoru Hosoda)
3. Air Doll (Hirokazu Koreeda)
4. Ōsaka Hamlet (Fujirō Mitsuishi)
5. Annyeong Yumika (Tetsuaki Matsue)
6. April Bride (Ryūichi Hiroki)
7. Occult (Kōji Shiraishi)
8. Shōnen Merikensakku (Kankurō Kudō)
9. Pride (Shusuke Kaneko)
9. Oh, My Buddha! (Tomorowo Taguchi)

== 5 best films of the zero era ==
1. Eureka (Shinji Aoyama)
2. United Red Army (Kōji Wakamatsu)
3. Bright Future (Kiyoshi Kurosawa)
4. Akame 48 Waterfalls (Genjiro Arato)
5. Ichi the Killer (Takashi Miike)
