= Houka Kinoshita =

Japanese actor (born 1964)

- 木下ほうか
- Born: January 24, 1964 (age 62); Daitō, Osaka, Japan
- Occupation: Actor
- Years active: 1981–2022

Houka Kinoshita (木下 ほうか, Kinoshita Hōka; born January 24, 1964, in Daitō, Osaka, Japan) is a Japanese actor who was formerly represented by the talent agency, Cast Power. He graduated from Osaka Prefectural Nozaki High School and Osaka University of Arts.

== Biography ==
In 1980, Kinoshita auditioned for the film, Gaki Teikoku, which he passed and made his acting debut. After graduating from Osaka University of Arts, he entered Yoshimoto Kogyo and joined Yoshimoto Shinkigeki troupe, but he did little to stand out on the comedy stage, and quit after three years. In 1989, Kinoshita moved to Tokyo at the request of director Kazuyuki Izutsu and became one of the popular by-players in Japanese cinema. He later moved to Cast Power in 2011. Kinoshita's hobby is riding a bike, and his skills are kick-boxing and karate.

=== Sexual assault allegations ===
In March 2022, three actresses came forward that Kinoshita sexually assaulted and abused them in 2011. Hideo Sakaki, a close friend of Kinoshita who had appeared in several of Sakaki's films, was accused by four actresses of similar allegations. The victims allege that Kinoshita and Sakaki collaborated in sexual coercion by introducing young women to each other that were looking to break into the film industry. Shortly after the allegations surfaced, Kinoshita released a statement stating that "there are some differences from the facts" and that he does not remember certain events from ten years ago. However, he added that the events are "generally correct" and proceeded to apologize to the victims and others who were "deeply injured" by his actions; he also indefinitely ceased his "entertainment activities." Kinoshita was dropped by his management Cactus.

== Filmography ==
=== TV series ===
Year	Title	Role	Network	Notes	Ref.
1991	Seichō Matsumoto Sakka Katsudō 40 Nenkinen-ha no tō		Fuji TV		
1992	Aki no Tokusen Supense		KTV		
1994	Kigyō Byōtō		NHK		
1995	Saikō no Koibito		TV Asahi		
1997	Onna Bengoshi Yuriko Mizushima no Kikenna Jiken File		Fuji TV		
1998	Gakkō no Kaidan G		Fuji TV		
2000	Hate Tsuru Soko Naki		Fuji TV		
2000	Tamaru Onna		TV Tokyo		
2000	Saigo no Strike		Fuji TV		
2001	Kenkaku Shōbai	Bunkichi	Fuji TV	3rd Series, Episode 2	
2001	Kyōto Satsujin Annai	Shintaro Kusamori	TV Asahi		
2002	Kyōto Gion-iri Muko Keiji Jiken-bo		Fuji TV		
2002	Gokenin Zankurō	Ushimatsu	Fuji TV	5th Series, Episode 8	
2002	Inyōshi Abenoseimei: Ō Toyōkitan		Fuji TV		
2002	Taxi Driver's Mystery Diary	Kiyoshi Okabe	TV Asahi		
2002	Omatsuri Bengoshi Goro Sawada	Katsunari Suzuki	TV Asahi		
2003	Kētai Keiji Zenigata Namida		BS-TBS		
2003	Teru Teru Kazoku	Oka	NHK		
2003	Anata no Tonari ni Dare ka Iru	Takuro Miyoshi	Fuji TV		
2003	Chouseishin Gransazer	Henry Wakasugi	TV Tokyo		
2004	Onmyō Shōjo		KBS		
2004	Sky High 2	Masaharu Yanagihara	TV Asahi	Episode 1	
2004	Onsen (Hi) Dai Sakusen	Toshio Maruyama	TV Asahi		
2005	Garo		TV Tokyo	Episode 10	
2005	Bungaku no Uta Koisuru Nichiyōbi	Shuzo Imitsuoka	BS-TBS		
2006	Fukushū no Diamond		TV Asahi		
2006	Tokumei Kakarichō Hitoshi Tadano		TV Asahi		
2006	Kētai Keiji Zenigata Kaminari		BS-TBS		
2006	Shin Keishichō Josei Sōsahan	Kosuke Ofuna	TV Asahi		
2007	Aibō		TV Asahi	Season 5, Episode 12	
2007	Akuma ga Kirite Fue o Fuku		Fuji TV		
2007	Byakkotai		TV Asahi		
2007	Tokyo Eki o Wasuremono Azukari-sho	Shu Takimoto	TV Asahi		
2007	Seicho Matsumoto Special Drama Nura Reta Hon	Shinji Yamada	TBS		
2008	Negima! Magister Negi Magi		TV Tokyo		
2008	Kamen Rider Kiva	Akira Kido	TV Asahi		
2008	Tsuiseki: Shissō Hito Sōsa-kan Shinjiro Ishimori		TBS		
2008	Team Batista no Eikō	Tamotsu Kishikawa	Fuji TV		
2008	Room of King	Man of film distribution company	Fuji TV		
2008	Joshidai Nama Kaikeishi no Jiken-bo	Akihiko Okudaira	BS-TBS	Episode 10	
2008	Shūchakueki no Ushio Keiji vs. Jiken Kisha Saeko	Gunji Tsumada	TV Asahi		
2009	Nene: Onna Taikōki	Ashikaga Yoshiaki	TV Tokyo		
2009	Naniwa Nohana: Ogata Kōan Jiken-chō	Kashimaya	NHK		
2009	Rikon Tsuma Tantei		TBS		
2009	Hanchō: Jinnan-sho Asaka Han		TBS	Episode 11; Guest	
2009	Kon Katsu!	Akira Kishida	Fuji TV	Episode 10; Guest	
2009	Gyōretsu 48-jikan		NHK		
2010	Jirocho Shimizu no Jirochō Ishin-den		TV Tokyo		
2010	853: Keiji Shinnosuke Kamo	Tetsuya Kuroiwa	TV Asahi	Episode 2	
2010	Chase: Kokuzei Sasatsu-kan	Tadokoro	NHK		
2010	Tumbling		TBS	Episode 2	
2010	Kōiki Keisatsu	Teruhisa Urushibara	TV Asahi		
2010	GeGeGe no Nyōbō	Haruta	NHK		
2010	Hissatsu Shigoto Hito 2010	Yaichiro Tsubaki	ABC, TV Asahi		
2010	Ihin no Koe o Kiku Otoko	Masami Tajima	TV Asahi		
2010	Setsuen	Minoru Kamiya	TV Tokyo		
2011	Iryū Sōsa		TV Asahi	Episode 6	
2011	Toge no Machi		TV Asahi		
2011	Zeimu Chōsakan Tarō Madogiwa no Jiken-bo	Noriyuki Naruse	TBS		
2011	Castle of Sand	Chief Tanaka	TV Asahi	Episode 2	
2011	100 no Shikaku o Motsu Onna: Futari no Batsuichi Satsujin Sōsa	Hiromasa Yajima	TV Asahi		
2011	Kami-sama no Nyōbō	Juzaburo Goto	NHK	Episode 3	
2011	Aka Kabu Kenji Funsen-ki	Saburo Hirotaki	TBS		
2011	Ai Inochi: Shinjuku Kabukichō Kakekomi Tera		TV Asahi		
2012	Kaitaku-sha-tachi	Shigeruzo Sakamoto	NHK BS Premium		
2012	Hōigaku Kyōshitsu no Jiken File	Nakazawa	TV Asahi		
2012	Akumu no Drive	Isozaki	BS Asahi		
2012	Hidamari no Ki	Hotta Masayoshi	NHK BS Premium		
2012	Hanchō: Keishichō Asaka Han	Jiro Kikujima	TBS	Episode 6	
2012	Haiiro no Niji	Toru Saga	TV Asahi		
2012	Mikaiketsu Jiken	Kiyohide Hayakawa	NHK	Episode 2	
2012	Keiji Seiichi Yoshinaga Namida no Jiken-bo	Koji Shinoyama	TV Tokyo		
2012	Shokatsu Deka	Masayuki Otomo	Fuji TV		
2012	Keigo Tono Mysteries	Yukio Sano	Fuji TV	Episode 7	
2012	Midorikawa Keibu vs. 33-bu no Yūki	Ichi Oikawa	TBS		
2013	Made in Japan	Desk	NHK	Episode 1	
2013	Mitsuhiko Asami Series	Keiji Morimoto	TBS		
2013	Kamo, Kyoto e Iku: Shinise Ryokan no Okami Nikki	Mutsuo Oda	Fuji TV	Episode 4	
2013	Onihei Hanka-chō Special Mihari no Ito	Toyozo	Fuji TV		
2013	Galileo		Fuji TV		
2013	Ganriki Keibuho Yaichi Kishima	Chi Nagano	TV Tokyo		
2013	Keishichō Sōsaikka 9 Kakari Season8	Ryoji Goto	TV Asahi	Episode 6	
2013	Kenji Masao Sawaki Dai San no Yōgi-sha	Keiji Kamishima	TV Tokyo		
2013	Kasōken no Onna Dai 13 Series	Haruhiko Kawadera	TV Asahi	Episodes 1 and 2	
2013	Sangaku Keiji	Kenji Suzaki	TBS		
2013	Kirawa re Kansatsu-kan Otonashi Ichi Roku: Keisatsu Naibu Chōsa no Oni	Masaru Matsuba	TV Tokyo		
2014	Nezumi, Edo o Hayaru	Sahei	NHK	Episode 3	
2014	Hanzai Shinri-gaku Kyōju Mamoru Kanesaka no Sōsa File	Hiroya Anami	TV Asahi		
2014	Genjirō Kamiya Torimono Hikae	Yakichi	NHK BS Premium	Episode 3	
2014	Gokuaku Ganbo	Higashiyama	Fuji TV	Episode 2	
2014	Mosaic Japan	Jonathan Wong	WOWOW		
2014	Hirugao: Heijitsu Gogo 3-ji no Koibito-tachi	Toru Takigawa	Fuji TV		
2014	Kuro-fuku Monogatari	Kurosawa	TV Asahi		
2014	Nobunaga Concerto	Keikuni Koizumi	Fuji TV	Episode 10	
2015	Ryūsei Wagon	Fujiki	TBS		
2015	Munesue Keiji no Kuroi Matsuri	Tetsuji Takakura	TV Asahi		
2015	Tatakau! Shoten Girl	Takanori Nojima	KTV		
2015	Hoshin	Daigo Hasumi	TV Tokyo		
2015	Enka: Gold Rush	Minowa	WOWOW		
2015	Ichiro	Kisoji Ito	NHK BS Premium		
2015	Risk no Kami-sama	For	Fuji TV	Final Episode	
2015	Shitamachi Rocket	Shigeharu Mizuhara	TBS		
2019	Natsuzora	Shigehiko Tsuyuki	NHK	Asadora	
2019	Sherlock: Untold Stories	Futoshi Ishii	Fuji TV	Episode 1	
2020	Kirin ga Kuru	Oda Nobumitsu	NHK	Taiga drama	

=== Film ===
Year	Title	Role	Notes	Ref.
1981	Gaki Teikoku			
1993	Do Chinpira			
	Demon Fighter Kocho			
1994	Kenka-ya Densetsu no Ura Kenka-shi! Muhai Densetsu			
1994	Godzilla vs. SpaceGodzilla	Hideki Ono		
1996	Young Thugs: Innocent Blood	Sada		
1997	Marutai no Onna	Eiji		
1997	Jingi 11 Hokuriku Gokudō Kari			
1998	Wait and See	Salary Worker		
1999	Poppoya	Miner		
1999	Spellbound	Nagayama		
2001	Ichi the Killer	DV man		
2001	Onmyoji	Emperor Kanmu		
2001	Godzilla, Mothra and King Ghidorah: Giant Monsters All-Out Attack	Motorcycle gang captain		
2002	Igyō no Koi			
2002	Ryuji Forever	Ishihara		
2002	Harmful Insect	Track Driver		
2002	Pakodate Hito	Edit director		
2002	Doing Time	Ouchi		
2003	Get Up!	Kinoshita		
2003	When the Last Sword Is Drawn	Photographer		
2005	Break Through!			
2005	Kita no Reinen			
2005	Zoo			
2005	The Kouga Ninja Scrolls	Saemon Kisaragi		
	Irasshaimase, Kanja-sama			
2006	Aoi Uta: No do Jiman Seishun-hen			
2006	Nezu no Ban	Hashieda		
2006	A Cheerful Gang Turns the Earth			
2006	Oh! Oku	Boatman		
2006	Yo-Yo Girl Cop			
2007	Ai no Ryūkeichi	Court bailiff		
2007	Patchigi! Love&Peace			
2007	Celeb ga Kekkonshitai 13 no Akuma	Akira Kimikoshi		
2007	Kitokito!			
2007	Tōbō Kuso Tawake			
2007	Grow			
2008	Kamachop	Azuma		
2008	Kamen Rider Kiva: King of the Castle in the Demon World	Akira Kido		
2008	Jirō Naga Sangokushi	Ono no Tsurukichi		
2008	Shiawase no Kaori			
2009	Asahiyama Zoo Story: Penguins in the Sky			
2009	Three Count			
2010	Yūkai Rhapsody	Endo		
2010	Itsuji Itao no Datsugoku-ō	Iizuka prison officer		
2010	Hero Show	Convenience store manager		
2010	Zebraman 2: Attack on Zebra City	Man attacked in Aihara		
2011	Mainichi Kaasan			
2011	Gekkō no Kamen			
2011	Karate-Robo Zaborgar			
2011	Gokudō Meshi	Prison officer Iwamoto		
2012	Okaeri, Hayabusa			
2012	Eden			
2012	Fujimi Orchestra	Kazuo Ichiyama		
2012	Boku no Naka no Otoko no Musume	Shizuka Mama		
2013	Daijōbu 3-kumi			
2013	Tenshin			
2013	Hyaku-nen no Tokei			
2014	In the Hero			
2014	Itsuka no, Genkan-tachi to,	Takeshi Otsuka		
2014	Greatful Dead	Kiyonao Shiomi	Also served as producer	
2015	Murder on D Street			
2015	Soromon no Gishō Zenpen Jiken / Kōhen Saiban	Kusuyama		
2015	Nora Inu wa Dansu o Odoru			
2017	Hamon: Yakuza Boogie			
2017	Love and Lies	Sosuke's father		
2018	We Make Antiques!			
2018	Recall	Kashiwabara		
2019	Whistleblower	Tabe		
2019	Manriki			
2020	Wiseguy			
2020	Stigmatized Properties	Matsuo		
2020	Kanemasa	Terada		
2020	We Make Antiques! Kyoto Rendezvous			
2021	Angry Rice Wives			
2021	First Gentleman	Minoru Tokuda		
2021	Nishinari Goro's 400 Million Yen			
