= Hinano Yoshikawa =

Japanese actress (born 1979)

Hinano Yoshikawa (吉川ひなの, born Ai Takada; December 21, 1979) is a Japanese actress, fashion model and singer.

== Biography ==
=== Life and career ===
Yoshikawa was born on December 21, 1979. In Higashikurume, Tokyo, Japan. She started her fashion model career at the age of 14 and still is a model.

She made her acting debut in 1997 in Moonlight Serenade (Setouchi munraito serenade). The following year she made her international debut in Jean-Pierre Limosin's Tokyo Eyes, a Franco-Japanese film, in which she played Hinano. This movie earned her the Best Debut Actress award at the Japanese Professional Movie Awards in 1999.

The first TV series she appeared in was The Last Song (Seikimatsu no uta) broadcast in 1998.

=== Personal life ===
In 1999, Yoshikawa married Izam, singer of Japanese visual kei rock band Shazna, only to file for separation two months later and divorce two months after that. Both the marriage and divorce caused a scandal.

== Filmography ==
=== Cinema ===
- Moonlight Serenade (Setouchi munraito serenade), 1997
- Tokyo Eyes, 1998
- Inu no eiga (lit. Dog's Movie), 2005
- Who's Camus Anyway? (Kamyu nante shiranai), 2005
- Haunted Highway (Death Ride), 2006

=== TV series ===
- The Last Song (TV series) (Seikimatsu no uta), 1998
- Waratte iitomo, 2000-2002
- Golden Bowl (Gōruden bouru), 2002

== Music ==
=== Discography ===
- I Am Pink (CD album, Pony Canyon PCCA-01200), 1998
