= Okami-san =

Japanese manga series

- First tankōbon volume cover

おかみさん
- Genre: Comedy; Slice of life; Sports
- Manga
- Written by: Ichimaru
- Published by: Shogakukan
- Magazine: Big Comic Original
- Original run: 1990 – 1999
- Volumes: 17
- Manga

Okami-san Heisei Basho
- Written by: Ichimaru
- Published by: Shogakukan
- Magazine: Big Comic Original
- Original run: October 20, 2011 – September 5, 2013
- Volumes: 2
- icon

Okami-san (おかみさん; lit. 'The Manageress') is a Japanese manga series written and illustrated by Ichimaru. It was serialized in Shogakukan's seinen manga magazine Big Comic Original from 1990 to 1999, with its chapters collected in 17 tankōbon volumes. It was followed by a sequel, Okami-san Heisei Basho, serialized in the same magazine from 2011 to 2013, with its chapters collected in two tankōbon volumes. The series is about a woman who becomes the manager of a stable of sumo wrestlers.

In 1993, Okami-san won the 38th Shogakukan Manga Award in the general category.

== Plot ==
Hatsuko Yamazaki (山咲 はつ子, Yamazaki Hatsuko) is a cheerful and energetic woman who becomes the manageress of the newly established Kasugabeya stable after marrying sumo wrestler Kazuo Yamazaki (山咲 一雄, Yamazaki Kazuo). Initially, she has no knowledge of sumo, is inexperienced in household management, and struggles with cooking. Despite these challenges, her optimism and determination allow her to connect with the stable's young wrestlers. Through conflicts and mutual encouragement, she gradually grows into a supportive figure for them. Set in the world of professional sumo, the series depicts the daily life of a sumo stable, incorporating details about sumo traditions and culture. The story focuses on Hatsuko's personal growth as she adapts to her role and forms bonds with the wrestlers under her care.

== Publication ==
Written and illustrated by Ichimaru, Okami-san was serialized in Shogakukan's seinen manga magazine Big Comic Original from 1990 to 1999. Shogakukan collected its chapters in seventeen tankōbon volumes, released from August 30, 1991, to March 30, 1999.

A sequel, titled Okami-san Heisei Basho (おかみさん 平成場所; lit. 'The Manageress: Heisei Tournament'), was serialized for sixteen chapters in the same magazine from October 20, 2011, to September 5, 2013. Two tankōbon volumes were released on February 28 and December 27, 2013.

=== Volumes ===
==== Okami-san ====
No.	Japanese release date	Japanese ISBN
1	August 30, 1991	978-4-09-182651-0
2	December 17, 1991	978-4-09-182652-7
3	July 30, 1992	978-4-09-182653-4
4	January 30, 1993	978-4-09-182654-1
5	September 30, 1993	978-4-09-182655-8
6	April 28, 1994	978-4-09-182656-5
7	November 30, 1994	978-4-09-182657-2
8	August 30, 1995	978-4-09-182658-9
9	April 27, 1996	978-4-09-182659-6
10	September 30, 1996	978-4-09-182660-2
11	February 28, 1997	978-4-09-184411-8
12	June 30, 1997	978-4-09-184412-5
13	September 30, 1997	978-4-09-184413-2
14	February 26, 1998	978-4-09-184414-9
15	July 30, 1998	978-4-09-184415-6
16	October 30, 1998	978-4-09-184416-3
17	March 30, 1999	978-4-09-184417-0

==== Okami-san Heisei Basho ====
No.	Japanese release date	Japanese ISBN
1	February 28, 2013	978-4-09-185023-2
2	December 27, 2013	978-4-09-185724-8

== Reception ==
In 1993, alongside Hideki Arai's Miyamoto kara Kimi e, Okami-san won the 38th Shogakukan Manga Award in the general category.
