= 10th Japan Film Professional Awards =

Japanese film awards in 2001

- Date: April 14, 2001
- Site: Shin-Bungeiza, Tokyo, Japan

The 10th Japan Film Professional Awards (第10回日本映画プロフェッショナル大賞) was the 10th edition of the Japan Film Professional Awards. It awarded the best of film in 2000. The ceremony took place on April 14, 2001 at Shin-Bungeiza in Tokyo.

== Awards ==
- Best Film: Charisma
- Best Director: Junji Sakamoto (Face)
- Best Actress: Rena Tanaka (First Love)
- Best Actor: Kōji Chihara (Hysteric)
- Best New Encouragement: Yūsuke Iseya (Across a Gold Prairie)
- Best New Encouragement: Hitomi Miwa (Crazy Lips)
- Best New Director: Akira Ogata (Boys' Choir)
- Special: Hiroyuki Okiura (Jin-Roh: The Wolf Brigade)
- Movie King of 90's: Takashi Miike
- Movie King of 90's: Rikkyo University S.P.P.

== 10 best films ==
1. Charisma (Kiyoshi Kurosawa)
2. Face (Junji Sakamoto)
3. Tokyo Trash Baby (Ryūichi Hiroki)
4. Hysteric (Takahisa Zeze)
5. First Love (Tetsuo Shinohara)
6. Nagisa (Masaru Konuma)
7. By Player (Kaneto Shindo)
8. I Am an S&M Writer (Ryūichi Hiroki)
9. Boys' Choir (Akira Ogata)
9. Jin-Roh: The Wolf Brigade (Hiroyuki Okiura)
9. Bullet Ballet (Shinya Tsukamoto)
