= Goodbye, Eri =

Japanese manga by Tatsuki Fujimoto

- Volume cover

さよなら絵梨 (Sayonara Eri)
- Genre: Drama; Mystery
- Manga
- Written by: Tatsuki Fujimoto
- Published by: Shueisha
- English publisher: NA: Viz Media
- Magazine: Shōnen Jump+
- Published: April 11, 2022
- Volumes: 1

Goodbye, Eri (Japanese: さよなら絵梨, Hepburn: Sayonara Eri) is a Japanese one-shot web manga written and illustrated by Tatsuki Fujimoto. It was released on the Shōnen Jump+ website in April 2022 and published in print in July 2022.

== Plot ==
Yuta Ito receives a smartphone for his birthday. Shortly after opening his present, Yuta's terminally ill mother assigns him the task of filming her and compiling a movie about her in the event of her death. After she dies, Yuta premieres the movie at his school but is met with heavy derision over his decision to end the film with him running away from an exploding hospital. Bullied and ostracized, Yuta decides to commit suicide by jumping from the roof of his mother's hospital. He is stopped by a girl named Eri, who reveals that she actually loved his movie and urges him to make another one. The two work together to bring this to fruition, alternating between production and marathoning various movies for inspiration and education. They decide on making the movie a semi-documentary about themselves, but with various exaggerations and fictional elements, most prominently the idea of Eri being a vampire.

Yuta and Eri grow closer as time goes by until Eri falls unconscious while the two are playing at the beach. Eri is also revealed to be terminally ill like Yuta's mother. A depressed Yuta is discouraged from attempting any more progress on his movie. However, his father encourages him to push forward while also revealing to the reader that Yuta's mother was actually abusive towards her son and husband. The film she had Yuta make was an attempt to either capitalize on her illness if she survived or memorialize her in a positive light if she died. Showcasing an early glimpse of untrustworthy nature of reality and fiction.

Yuta and Eri complete their movie just before Eri dies. Yuta screens his new movie, which is met with praise this time around. Yuta is later confronted by one of Eri's friends, and the two admit that Eri was not the idealized version Yuta filmed and edited for their movie, but both agree they prefer to remember their mutual friend this way. Since then, Yuta spends time balancing his normal life with his obsession to recut Eri's movie.

Years later, an adult Yuta suffers the loss of his wife, child, and father in a car accident. Losing the will to live, Yuta decides once more to attempt suicide at the screening room where he and Eri would marathon movies. Arriving there, Yuta discovers a still-alive and youthful Eri. Eri reveals that she really is a vampire who repeatedly experiences memory loss caused by cycles of brain death throughout her eternal life. The Eri from her previous life had left specific instructions for her future incarnations, as well as the movie she and Yuta made to ensure that she would remember him forever and know what kind of person she should strive to be. His will to live restored, Yuta bids farewell to Eri and leaves. Behind him, the building that housed the screening room exploded, much like in the ending of his movie about his mother, leaving the reality of previous scenes ambiguous.

== Publication ==
On February 4, 2022, Shihei Lin, an editor at Shueisha, announced that Tatsuki Fujimoto would be writing a 200-page one-shot, which was released on the Shōnen Jump+ website on April 11, 2022. The manga was published in tankōbon form on July 4, 2022.

Viz Media and Manga Plus published the manga simultaneously with the Japanese release. The tankōbon volume was released by Viz Media on June 27, 2023.

== Reception ==
Within a day of its release, the manga garnered over 2.2 million views on the Shōnen Jump+ website. It ranked second in the 2023 edition of Takarajimasha's Kono Manga ga Sugoi! list of best manga for male readers. It ranked sixth on "The Best Manga 2023 Kono Manga wo Yome!" ranking by Freestyle magazine. It ranked seventh in the 16th Manga Taishō in 2023. The series was nominated for a Harvey Award in the Best Manga category in 2023. It was also nominated for the Eisner Award in the Best U.S. Edition of International Material—Asia category in 2024.

Adi Tantimedh from Bleeding Cool praised the plot and characters, calling it one of the best comics of 2022. Tyra from Animate Times praised the plot and artwork, particularly noting its panel division and other effects. Chinese digital newspaper The paper praised the manga for its use of techniques such as meta-cinema, play within play, intermediatity, self-reference, fractal narrative, and narrative trickery, describing it as an "ergodic avant-garde experiment".
