= Tatsuki Fujimoto Before Chainsaw Man =

Japanese one-shot manga collection

- First tankōbon volume cover

藤本タツキ短編集 (Fujimoto Tatsuki Tanpenshū)
- Genre: Fantasy comedy; Horror
- Manga
- Written by: Tatsuki Fujimoto
- Published by: Shueisha
- English publisher: NA: Viz Media
- Imprint: Jump Comics+
- Published: October 4, 2021 (#1); November 4, 2021 (#2)
- Volumes: 2
- Original net animation

Tatsuki Fujimoto 17–26
- Directed by: Seishirō Nagaya (1); Nobukage Kimura (2); Nobuyuki Takeuchi (3); Naoya Ando (4); Tetsuaki Watanabe (5, 7); Kazuaki Terasawa (6); Shū Honma (8)
- Written by: Seishirō Nagaya (1); Teruko Utsumi (2 & 3); Naoya Ando (4); Tatsuo Kobayashi (5); Kōhei Tokuoka (6); Tetsuaki Watanabe (7); Yoko Yonaiyama (8)
- Music by: Rei Ishizuka (1, 5 & 6); Keiji Inai (2); Yuma Yamaguchi (3); Kenji Kawai (4); Kevin Penkin (7); Masahiro Tokuda (8)
- Studio: Zexcs (1); Lapin Track (2 & 3); Studio Graph77 (4); 100studio (5, 7); Studio Kafka (6); P.A. Works (8)
- Licensed by: Amazon Prime Video
- Released: November 7, 2025
- Runtime: 12–22 minutes
- Episodes: 8
- icon

Tatsuki Fujimoto Before Chainsaw Man, known in Japan as Fujimoto Tatsuki Tanpenshū (藤本タツキ短編集; lit. 'Tatsuki Fujimoto's Short Stories'), is a Japanese two-volume anthology collection of one-shot stories written and illustrated by Tatsuki Fujimoto. The two volumes, 17–21 and 22–26, were released in October and November 2021, respectively. An original net animation (ONA) adaptation of the anthology, titled Tatsuki Fujimoto 17–26, was released worldwide on Amazon Prime Video in November 2025.

== Overview ==
"A Couple Clucking Chickens Were Still Kickin' in the Schoolyard"
In 2019, an extraterrestrial force successfully defeated Earth, resulting in widespread devastation for humanity. To the victors, humans are no more than livestock, just as chickens once were to people. However, two human survivors, Yūto and Ami, are currently concealed in a school courtyard that has been overrun by extraterrestrial students. They have survived by disguising themselves as chickens, which are creatures that most aliens find unappealing. However, a diligent student named Yōhei discovers their secret and opposes the senseless slaughter of humans, deciding to help them survive.
"Sasaki Stopped a Bullet"
Sasaki holds his teacher, Chieko Kawaguchi, in the highest regard. She instilled in him the value of pursuing his dreams with confidence and determination, regardless of the challenges he might face. However, one day, elements of Kawaguchi's past resurface, jeopardizing her reputation and potentially impacting her professional standing among her students. Sasaki is determined to defend his idol. He puts her own teachings into practice, pushing himself to achieve the impossible in order to protect her.
"Love is Blind"
As student council president, Ibuki has achieved much, but he attributes his successes to his only fellow member, Yuri Kōnosu. As he approaches graduation and his departure for university, he resolves to confess his feelings to her. This personal objective takes precedence over all other responsibilities, including his official duties. He is resolute in his decision to proceed, undeterred by any anticipated challenges.
"Shikaku"
Shikaku is a highly skilled assassin known for her meticulous precision and her ability to show unexpected compassion. Her latest client, Yugeru, is an immortal vampire weary of endless existence. In a desperate attempt to secure his release, he offers Shikaku $100 million to bring his life to an end. When she fails, she apologizes for his suffering, and he forgives her. Their mutual empathy fosters a sense of connection. Yugeru has lost all hope, but Shikaku's resolve may become the spark that rekindles his will to live.
"Mermaid Rhapsody"
Toshihide, the son of a mermaid, has the ability to hold his breath for extended periods. He utilizes this talent to play an underwater piano. His music attracts a mermaid named Shiju, who saves him when he runs out of air. In return, he provides her with piano lessons, fostering a close bond between them. Toshihide later confronts the legend that mermaids eat humans, fearing that his friendship with Shiju may result in him becoming her prey.
"Woke-Up-as-a-Girl Syndrome"
Following a diagnosis of the irreversible "Woke-Up-as-a-Girl Syndrome", Toshihide experiences isolation and harassment from his classmates and is forced to reevaluate his relationship with his girlfriend, Rie. His situation becomes more complex as he begins to perceive Rie's brother, Akira, in a new manner. Previously prone to avoiding confrontation, Toshihide now must learn to confront his challenges directly in order to establish a new sense of normalcy and fundamentally redefine his own identity.
"Nayuta of the Prophecy"
Nayuta, a child with a horned appearance and a congenital absence of a human heart and cursed speech, was prophesied before birth to bring about the world's end. She is a figure of fear and disdain, and is held responsible for the deaths of her parents and the suffering of many. Despite the challenges she faces, her brother Kenji remains committed, working diligently to care for and protect her. While Kenji manages a variety of tasks, Nayuta spends her days reading, creating swords, and hunting rodents for food. As public concern about her existence grows, Kenji struggles with the complexity of his relationship with his sister, who could potentially be the harbinger of apocalypse.
"Sisters"
A nude portrait of Mitsuko Ebara is displayed at the entrance of her school after her sister Kyōko's painting wins the top prize in a prestigious art competition. In accordance with academic tradition, the award-winning work is exhibited for a full year, forcing Mitsuko to endure relentless teasing and humiliation from her classmates. Furious and embarrassed, she vows to make Kyōko suffer as she has.

== Characters ==
=== A Couple Clucking Chickens Were Still Kickin' in the Schoolyard ===
Yūto (ユウト)
Voiced by: Kensho Ono (Japanese); Edward Stoneguard (English)
Ami (アミ)
Voiced by: Shion Sakurai
Yōhei (陽平)
Voiced by: Kazuki Ura
Megumi Kaneda (金田萌美, Kaneda Megumi)
Voiced by: Kimiko Saitō
Masatoshi Endō (遠藤マサトシ, Endō Masatoshi)
Voiced by: Mitsuo Iwata

=== Sasaki Stopped a Bullet ===
Sasaki (佐々木くん, Sasaki-kun)
Voiced by: Toshiki Kumagai (Japanese); Stephen Fu (English)
Chieko Kawaguchi (川口千恵子, Kawaguchi Chieko)
Voiced by: Chika Anzai (Japanese); Brittany Cox (English)
Kuwano (桑野)
Voiced by: Yoichi Okano (Japanese); Cory Yee (English)

=== Love is Blind ===
Ibuki (伊吹)
Voiced by: Shun Horie (Japanese); Nick Thurston (English)
Yuri Kōnosu (鴻巣ユリ, Kōnosu Yuri)
Voiced by: Shion Wakayama (Japanese); Abby Espiritu (English)
Hayasaka-sensei (早坂先生)
Voiced by: Toshiyuki Morikawa
Robber (強盗, Gōtō)
Voiced by: Takahiro Yamamoto
Alien (宇宙人, Uchūbito)
Voiced by: Junichi Suwabe
Alien Bride (宇宙人嫁, Uchūbito yome)
Voiced by: Mamiko Noto

=== Shikaku ===
Shikaku (シカク)
Voiced by: Kana Hanazawa (Japanese); Madeline Dorroh (English)
Yugeru (ユゲル)
Voiced by: Tomokazu Sugita (Japanese); Aleks Le (English)

=== Mermaid Rhapsody ===
Toshihide (トシヒデ)
Voiced by: Chiaki Kikuta (Japanese); Nick Carson (English)
Shiju (シジュ)
Voiced by: Eri Yukimura (Japanese); Cassandra Lee Morris (English)

=== Woke-Up-as-a-Girl Syndrome ===
Toshihide (トシヒデ)
Voiced by: Yuki Sakakihara (Japanese); Cynthia Fears (English)
Rie (リエ)
Voiced by: Maki Kawase (Japanese); Shelby Young (English)
Akira (アキラ)
Voiced by: Seiichirō Yamashita (Japanese); Brian Doe Chua (English)

=== Nayuta of the Prophecy ===
Nayuta (ナユタ)
Voiced by: Hitomi Sasaki (Japanese); Courtney Chu (English)
Kenji (ケンジ)
Voiced by: Yōhei Matsuoka (Japanese); Adam McArthur (English)

=== Sisters ===
Mitsuko Ebara (江原光子, Ebara Mitsuko)
Voiced by: Runa Nakashima (Japanese); Hayden Bishop (English)
Kyōko Ebara (江原杏子, Ebara Kyōko)
Voiced by: Tomo Nakai (Japanese); Courtney Lin (English)
Teacher (先生, Sensei)
Voiced by: Tomohiko Imai (Japanese); Roger Rose (English)

== Publication ==
Tatsuki Fujimoto Before Chainsaw Man consists of eight early one-shot stories written and illustrated by Tatsuki Fujimoto before starting his second manga series Chainsaw Man. The first volume, 17–21, includes: "A Couple Clucking Chickens Were Still Kickin' in the Schoolyard" (庭には二羽ニワトリがいた, Niwa ni wa Niwa Niwatori ga ita) (released in 2011); "Sasaki Stopped a Bullet" (佐々木くんが銃弾止めた, Sasaki-kun ga Juudan Tometa) (released in 2013); "Love is Blind" (恋は盲目, Koi wa Moumoku) (released in 2013); and "Shikaku" (シカク) (released in 2014). The tankōbon volume was published by Shueisha on October 4, 2021.

The second volume, 22–26, includes: "Mermaid Rhapsody" (人魚ラプソディ, Ningyo Rapusodi) (released in 2014); "Woke-Up-as-a-Girl Syndrome" (目が覚めたら女の子になっていた病, Me ga Sametara Onnanoko ni Natteita Yamai) (released in 2017); "Nayuta of the Prophecy" (予言のナユタ, Yogen no Nayuta) (released in 2015); and "Sisters" (妹の姉, Imōto no Ane) (released in 2018). The volume was released on November 4, 2021.

In North America, Viz Media announced that it had licensed both volumes in June 2022; they were released on January 17 and April 18, 2023, respectively.

=== Volumes ===
No.	Original release date	Original ISBN	English release date	English ISBN
1	October 4, 2021	978-4-08-882803-9	January 17, 2023	978-1-9747-3477-1
1. "A Couple Clucking Chickens Were Still Kickin' in the Schoolyard" (庭には二羽ニワトリがいた, Niwa ni wa Niwa Niwatori ga ita); 2. "Sasaki Stopped a Bullet" (佐々木くんが銃弾止めた, Sasaki-kun ga Juudan Tometa); 3. "Love is Blind" (恋は盲目, Koi wa Moumoku); 4. "Shikaku" (シカク)
2	November 4, 2021	978-4-08-882822-0	April 18, 2023	978-1-9747-3478-8
1. "Mermaid Rhapsody" (人魚ラプソディ, Ningyo Rhapsody); 2. "Woke-Up-as-a-Girl Syndrome" (目が覚めたら女の子になっていた病, Me ga Sametara Onnanoko ni Natteita Yamai); 3. "Nayuta of the Prophecy" (予言のナユタ, Yogen no Nayuta); 4. "Sisters" (妹の姉, Imōto no Ane)

== Anime adaptation ==
In September 2025, it was announced that the eight stories would each receive an original net animation (ONA) adaptation, titled Tatsuki Fujimoto 17–26 (藤本タツキ 17–26), which debuted worldwide on Amazon Prime Video on November 7 of the same year. Each story was produced by a different staff and animation studio. The eight-episode series had a limited two-week run in nine Japanese cinemas starting on October 17, screening in two four-episode parts.

It had a world premiere in the United States on October 5, 2025, during the Global Stage Hollywood Film Festival at the TCL Chinese 6 Theatre in Hollywood.

=== Episodes ===
No.	Title	Directed by	Written by	Animation studio	Original release date
1	"A Couple Clucking Chickens Were Still Kickin' in the Schoolyard"; Transliteration: "Kōteide wa, Sū-wa no Niwatori ga mada Kokkotto Nakinagara genki ni Ugokimawatte ita" (Japanese: 校庭では、数羽のニワトリがまだコッコッと鳴きながら元気に動き回っていた。)	Seishirô Nagaya	Seishirô Nagaya	Zexcs	November 7, 2025
2	"Sasaki Stopped a Bullet"; Transliteration: "Sasaki-kun ga jū-dan Tometa" (Japanese: 佐々木くんが十段とめた)	Nobukage Kimura	Teruko Utsumi	Lapin Track	November 7, 2025
3	"Love Is Blind"; Transliteration: "Koihamōmoku" (Japanese: 恋は盲目)	Nobuyuki Takeuchi	Teruko Utsumi	Lapin Track	November 7, 2025
4	"Shikaku"; Transliteration: "Shikaku" (Japanese: シカク)	Naoya Andô	Naoya Andô	Studio Graph77	November 7, 2025
5	"Mermaid Rhapsody"; Transliteration: "Ningyo rapusodi" (Japanese: 人魚ラプソディ)	Tetsuaki Watanabe	Tatsuo Kobayashi	100studio	November 7, 2025
6	"Woke-Up-as-a-Girl Syndrome"; Transliteration: "Asaokitara on'nanoko ni natte ita shōkōgun" (Japanese: 朝起きたら女の子になっていた症候群)	Kazuaki Terasawa	Kazuaki Terasawa	Studio Kafka	November 7, 2025
7	"Nayuta of the Prophecy"; Transliteration: "Yogen no nayuta" (Japanese: 予言のナユタ)	Kai Hasako & Tetsuaki Watanabe	Tetsuaki Watanabe	100studio	November 7, 2025
8	"Sisters"; Transliteration: "Shimai" (Japanese: 姉妹)	Osamu Honma	Yoko Yonaiyama	P.A. Works	November 7, 2025

== Reception ==
Tatsuki Fujimoto 17–26 has been nominated for the 2026 International Emmy Awards in the Best Short-Form Series category.
