= 30th Japan Film Professional Awards =

Japanese film awards in 2021

- Date: 2021

The 30th Japan Film Professional Awards (Japanese: 第30回日本映画プロフェッショナル大賞, Hepburn: Dai 30-kai Nihon Eiga Purofesshonaru Taishō) was the 30th edition of the Japan Film Professional Awards. It awarded the best of 2020 in film. An award ceremony did not take place.

== Awards ==
- Best Film: The Real Thing
- Best Director: Hideo Jojo (On the Edge of Their Seats)
- Best Actress: Nana Komatsu (Sakura, Threads: Our Tapestry of Love)
- Best Actor: Tsuyoshi Kusanagi (Midnight Swan)
- Emerging Director: Hikari (37 Seconds)
- Special: Keisuke Toyoshima (Mishima: The Last Debate)
- Special: Arata Ōshima (Why You Can't Be Prime Minister)
- Special Achievement: Chiho Katsura (In recognition of his many years of accomplishments as a screenwriter, and as a member of the Nichipro Awards selection committee.)
- Special Achievement: Naoya Narita (In recognition of his many years of accomplishments as a producer, and as a member of the Nichipro Awards selection committee.)

== 10 best films ==
1. The Real Thing (Koji Fukada)
2. 37 Seconds (Hikari)
3. On the Edge of Their Seats (Hideo Jojo)
4. Underdog (Masaharu Take)
5. Midnight Swan (Tsuyoshi Kusanagi)
6. Voices in the Wind (Nobuhiro Suwa)
7. Labyrinth of Cinema (Nobuhiko Obayashi)
8. Reiko and the Dolphin (Shinji Imaoka)
9. A Beloved Wife (Shin Adachi)
10. Sakura (Hitoshi Yazaki)
10. Kotera-san Climbs! (Tomoyuki Furumaya)
