= Mishima: The Last Debate =

- Film poster
- Directed by: Keisuke Toyoshima
- Edited by: Masaki Murakami
- Distributed by: GAGA
- Release date: March 20, 2020
- Running time: 108 minutes
- Country: Japan
- Language: Japanese

Mishima: The Last Debate (Japanese: 三島由紀夫vs東大全共闘〜50年目の真実〜, Hepburn: Mishima Yukio vs Tōdai Zenkyōtō: 50 nenme no shinjitsu) is a 2020 Japanese documentary film by Japanese director Keisuke Toyoshima.

== Story ==
The documentary opens with an exploration of Yukio Mishima's life experiences and the New Left in Japan at the time. It then recreates archival footage of Mishima's May 13, 1969, debate with the All-Campus Joint Struggle Committees (Zenkyoto) in Room 900 at the Komaba Campus of the University of Tokyo. The film also includes follow-up interviews with participants from that era.

== Production and release ==
The documentary primarily draws on footage of the debate filmed by TBS Television at the time. The footage had long been believed lost, but was recently rediscovered and restored, forming the core of Keisuke Toyoshima's film.

Director Keisuke Toyoshima, though interested in the social issues explored in the film, initially felt he couldn't tackle the subject matter because he wasn't part of the student movement generation nor a devoted fan of Mishima's work. However, when producer Tetta Tone approached him, he decided to take on the project. The decisive factor was Tone's desire to make a film from the perspective of a generation unfamiliar with the impact of Mishima's suicide.

The film was distributed theatrically in Japan by Gaga on March 20, 2020. A Blu-ray/DVD edition was released on February 26, 2021.

== Reception ==
In Japan, the film topped Filmarks' opening-day audience satisfaction ranking and was also ranked No. 1 by Pia's first-day survey. According to Nippon Broadcasting's write-up citing Kogyo Tsushin's weekend tally, the documentary debuted at No. 7 in the nationwide admissions chart for March 21–22, 2020.

James Marsh of the South China Morning Post gave the film a 3.5/5 rating, writing that what he found most fascinating was likely the reaction of those present, regardless of which side of the political spectrum they stood on, as the debate unfolds.

The film received the Special Award at the 45th Hochi Film Awards in 2020. Keisuke Toyoshima was honored with the Special Award at the 30th Japan Film Professional Awards (2020) for this film.
