= Dear Stranger =

- Film poster
- Directed by: Tetsuya Mariko
- Written by: Tetsuya Mariko
- Produced by: Eisei Shu, Ying Liang, Julia Xu, Naoya Takahashi
- Starring: Hidetoshi Nishijima; Gwei Lun-mei
- Cinematography: Yasuyuki Sasaki, Rikuo Ueno
- Edited by: Matthieu Laclau
- Music by: Jim O'Rourke
- Production company: Toei Company Ltd.
- Distributed by: EST N8
- Release date: September 12, 2025
- Countries: Japan; Taiwan; United States
- Languages: English; Chinese

Dear Stranger is a 2025 film directed by Tetsuya Mariko starring Hidetoshi Nishijima and Gwei Lun-mei. It explores themes of trust and grief in the American immigrant experience and multi-cultural marriage between a Japanese man and his Taiwanese-American wife.

== Plot ==
Kenji, a Japanese professor studying ruins and seeking tenure, and his wife Jane, a Taiwanese-American puppeteer, have a happy life in New York City with their son, Kai. However, as Jane becomes more absorbed in her life as a mother, she begins to lose a hold on her artistic dreams and identity. Their lives are thrown out of spin when Kai goes missing.

== Production ==
The film is the first English production from Japan's Toei Company. It was shot entirely on location in New York City and edited in Taiwan.

Aside from Toei, the film is backed by Roji Inc. and has support from JLOX+ and the Taiwan Creative Content Agency (TAICCA).

Mariko was inspired to make the film upon his return to Japan from the U.S. after the COVID pandemic, pivoting from his previous focus on "absurd violence" towards an emotional drifting apart.

For Jane's puppeteer work, Mariko collaborated with Blair Thomas to choreograph puppetry that would express Jane's passion for the art form and her struggle balancing it with her family life.

== Cast ==
- Hidetoshi Nishijima as Kenji
- Gwei Lun-Mei as Jane
- Fiona Fu as Shu-An Yao
- Julian Wang as Donny

== Release ==
The film premiered on September 12, 2025 in Japan and screened at the 30th Busan International Film Festival on September 18.

The film was screened as a special screening film in the Nippon Cinema Now Section of the 38th Tokyo International Film Festival on November 4, 2025. It will be presented in 'Country Focus: Japan - 2025' section of the 56th International Film Festival of India in November 2025.
