= 32nd Japan Film Professional Awards =

Japanese film awards in 2023

- Date: June 17, 2023
- Site: Theatre Shinjuku, Tokyo, Japan

The 32nd Japan Film Professional Awards (Japanese: 第32回日本映画プロフェッショナル大賞, Hepburn: Dai 32-kai Nihon Eiga Purofesshonaru Taishō) was the 32nd edition of the Japan Film Professional Awards. It awarded the best of 2022 in film. The ceremony took place on June 17, 2023, at Theatre Shinjuku in Tokyo.

== Awards ==
- Best Film: This is Amiko
- Best Director: Junji Sakamoto (A Winter Rose)
- Best Actress: Rena Nōnen (The Fish Tale)
- Best Actress: Yūko Kageyama (The Wandering Bonbon)
- Best Actor: Tomomitsu Adachi (Drive Into Night)
- Emerging Director: Ema Kawawada (My Small Land)
- Emerging Director: Yūsuke Morii (This is Amiko)
- Special: The production team of Lesson in Murder (For their contributions to the film industry.)
- Special: Cinema Skhole (For many years of achievements.)

== 10 best films ==
1. This is Amiko (Yūsuke Morii)
2. No Place to Go (Banmei Takahashi)
3. My Small Land (Ema Kawawada)
4. The Nighthawk's First Love (Yuka Yasukawa)
5. Drive Into Night (Dai Sakō)
6. The Fish Tale (Shūichi Okita)
7. Love Life (Koji Fukada)
8. Love Nonetheless (Hideo Jojo)
9. A Winter Rose (Junji Sakamoto)
10. BL Metamorphosis (Shunsuke Kariyama)
