= Kawawa High School =

Public high school in Yokohama, Japan

Coordinates: 35°32′15.5″N 139°33′9.2″E

- Japanese: 神奈川県立川和高等学校
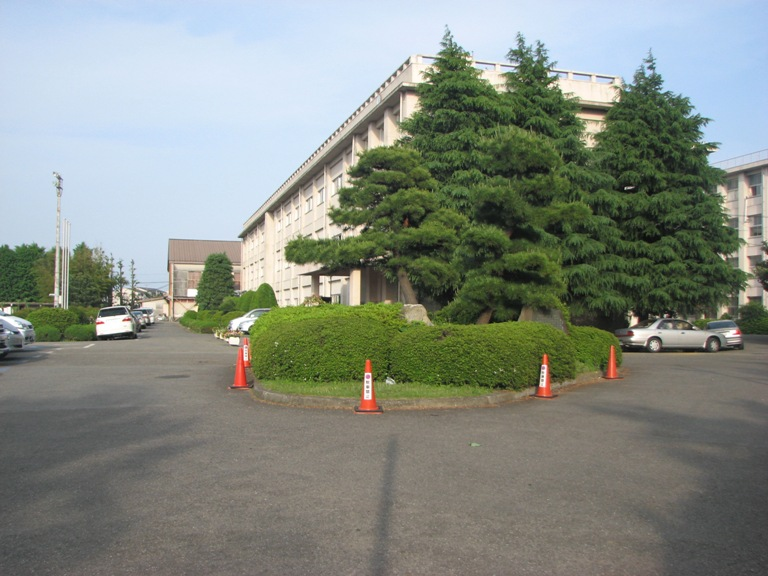

Information
- Website: www.pen-kanagawa.ed.jp/kawawa-h/

Kanagawa Prefectural Kawawa High School (Japanese: 神奈川県立川和高等学校, romanized: Kanagawa Kenritsu Kawawa Kōtōgakkō) is a high school in Tsuzuki-ku, Yokohama, Japan, founded in 1962. The school is operated by the Kanagawa Prefectural Board of Education.

== Notable students and teachers ==
- Hideki Arai
