= Tokyo Eyes =

- Directed by: Jean-Pierre Limosin
- Written by: Jean-Pierre Limosin; Santiago Amigorena; Philippe Madral; Yuji Sakamoto
- Produced by: Kenzo Horikoshi; Hengameh Panahi
- Starring: Shinji Takeda; Hinano Yoshikawa
- Cinematography: Jean-Marc Fabre
- Edited by: Danielle Anezin
- Music by: Xavier Jamaux
- Production companies: Lumen Films; Euro Space
- Distributed by: Lumen Films (France); Euro Space (Japan)
- Release dates: September 9, 1998 (France); October 24, 1998 (Japan)
- Running time: 97 minutes
- Countries: France; Japan
- Language: Japanese

Tokyo Eyes is a 1998 French-Japanese romantic thriller film directed by Jean-Pierre Limosin and starring Shinji Takeda and Hinano Yoshikawa. It was selected for the 1998 Cannes Film Festival in the Un Certain Regard category.

== Plot ==
K (Shinji Takeda), a young Japanese debugger and free-lance programmer (also Techno LPs collector in his free time), is a vigilante who non-fatally shoots wrong-doers as he encounters them in his daily life.

Before each shooting, he puts on a pair of thick glasses. The local media quickly names the mysterious attacker "Four-eyes" (Le Bigleux in the original version, lit. "the poor-sighted") based on the police composite.

Hinano (Hinano Yoshikawa) is a seventeen-year-old girl who works part-time as a hairdresser. She lives with her older brother Roy, a police officer (Tetta Sugimoto) assigned to the "Four-Eyes" case. While in the subway, she notices a young man secretly filming other passengers, and, intrigued, begins to follow him. Later, she asks her friend and co-worker Naomi (Kaori Mizushima) to join her investigation into the strange young man.

She finally approaches K, and they quickly become friends. He invites her to his apartment and shares his interests of trance music and video games with her. Hinano is suspicious, but she relents, and finds herself in the middle of a romance with the unconventional young man.

In the meantime, Four Eyes is still at large, and Roy's investigation is not closer to finding the shooter. Hinano witnesses one of K's shootings, and is conflicted about what she should do with this knowledge. Hinano confronts K, and K explains that he modified his pistol to be inaccurate, presumably so that the bullets don't actually hit its target. However, later on K accidentally kills one of his victims - a man who was breaking up with a girl for a different girl.

In a second confrontation, K reveals that he uses the thick glasses to cause his victims to hold still, and so that he himself cannot see his victims clearly. He admits that he would not be able to shoot his victims if he looked them in the eye. In addition, he takes video because of a desire to see what is going on in the world, not just look. Despite having much video footage of people, he says it is hard to see. But K explains to Hinano that he is willing to give it all up, and refers to Four-Eyes as someone he can separate from, which puts Hinano at ease.

K is visited by a low-ranking yakuza member (Beat Takeshi) who comes to pick up K's handgun which was apparently on loan, but it is accidentally fired into K's lower abdomen. K does not go to the hospital, but instead meets Hinano and walks around with her. K asks Hinano to meet him at the top of the tallest building in Tokyo. Hinano waits at the top of an observation deck, but K, succumbing to his wound, sways dangerously by the curb of a busy street. In the last sequence, Hinano is walking down the street. Her hand is grabbed; she looks up and sees K's smiling face.

The ending is ambiguous, since it is not clear whether K died. It should be pointed that the international version, including the Japanese one, features seven minutes of additional footage, and possibly a more explicit ending compared to the original cut.

== Cast ==
- Shinji Takeda as K
- Hinano Yoshikawa as Hinano
- Tetta Sugimoto as Roy
- Kaori Mizushima as Naomi
- Ren Osugi as Bus driver
- Masayuki Yui as Beauty parlor manager
- Moro Morooka as Video shop manager
- Ken Mitsuishi as Video shop customer
- Fumiya Tanaka as DJ
- Beat Takeshi as Yakuza

== Reception ==
At Rotten Tomatoes, the film holds an approval rating of 100% based on 5 reviews, and an average rating of 7.1/10. At Metacritic, the film has a weighted average score of 52 out of 100, based on 7 critics, indicating "mixed or average reviews".

Jason Buchanan of AllMovie gave the film 2 out of 5 stars, writing, "A curious hybrid of French sensibilities and Japanese aesthetics, Tokyo Eyes weaves the intriguing tale of a wannabe killer and the girl who falls for him to visually extravagant, but somewhat hollow, effect." Derek Elley of Variety commented that "Mostly shot in hand-held style, but with care rather than abandon, the film at least has a natural, untouristy feel for Tokyo's tangled geography and does not try to impose a faux-Japanese rigor to its visual makeup." Lawrence Van Gelder of The New York Times called the film "intriguing but ultimately irresolute". Reece Pendleton of Chicago Reader wrote, "The film may never fully attain the emotional resonance it seems to be striving for, but it's still an accomplished and interesting piece of work."

At the 8th Japanese Professional Movie Awards, Hinano Yoshikawa won the Best New Actress award.
