= Cafe Isobe =

- Film poster
- Directed by: Keisuke Yoshida
- Starring: Hiroyuki Miyasako; Riisa Naka; Kumiko Asō; Mari Hamada
- Release date: July 5, 2008 (Japan)
- Country: Japan
- Language: Japanese

Cafe Isobe (Japanese: 純喫茶磯辺, Hepburn: Jun-kissa Isobe) is a 2008 Japanese film directed by Keisuke Yoshida. It was in the Narrative Feature Competition at the 2008 Hawaii International Film Festival.

== Plot ==
Yujiro ISOBE is a 39-year-old steeplejack. He is divorced and lives with his daughter Sakiko, a high school junior, in an apartment complex. Sakiko is a good daughter who does all the housework, but Yujiro's work ethic is far from strong. Yujiro's ex-wife and Sakiko's mother, Mugiko, lives not far away and works at a bar. Sakiko sometimes visits her mother at the bar.

One day, Yujiro's father dies and Yujiro receives an inheritance, the amount of which is not disclosed. Yujiro stops going to work and spends every night at a "cabaret club" until the closing time.

One night, at the dinner table, Sakiko asks, with some hesitation, "Hey, Dad, aren't you going to work?" Yujiro evades the question, saying, "I'm thinking about it...." One day Yujiro happens enters a coffee shop and sees the owner talking intimately with a female customer, which makes him decide to open a coffee shop himself. While Sakiko is heavily surprised, Yujiro steadily proceeds with preparations for the opening. Eventually, Sakiko also becomes excited about the opening of the coffee shop, and suggests some stylish names for the shop in English to Yujiro.

When the opening preparations are well underway, Sakiko goes to see the site and fiercely protests that the shop name is "Jun-kissa Isobe," ("Jun-kissa" means "authentic cafe") and is shocked at how lame and unfashionable the interior is.

Yujiro hires a slightly overweight part-timer, Asami EGASHIRA, and Sakiko also decides to work as a waitress. The day of opening arrives. However, there is no sign of any customers. The next day, while Sakiko is at school, Motoko SUGAWARA comes to the shop as a customer. Motoko is of Yujiro's type. When Motoko asks Yujiro if he is hiring a part-timer while he hands her a commemorative opening gift, a cell phone strap, Yujiro immediately decides to hire Motoko. Sakiko comes to work after finishing school and vehemently protests to Yujiro about hiring Motoko from a business perspective, but Yujiro of course doesn't accept it. Furthermore, Yujiro fires Asami.

Because of the very scarcity of customers, Yujiro asks an old friend who runs a printing company to create flyers for the cafe. Sakiko and Motoko go to hand them out in front of the nearest train station, but few people take them. Although Sakiko and Yujiro don't know about it, Motoko slacks off and kills time at a burger restaurant, throwing the remaining stack of flyers in the trash when she leaves the restaurant.

When Sakiko gives up on handing out flyers and returns to the store, Yujiro shows her his new strategy. It is a revealing outfit, with a red miniskirt, that makes the wearer look like a prostitute. Sakiko is shocked and angry, and as soon as she protests that no woman could wear such an outfit, Motoko appears from the back of the shop wearing the outfit. When Motoko starts handing out flyers in front of the shop dressed like that, many men take them.

Thanks to Motoko, the cafe becomes very popular from the next day, and although there are customers who want to take pictures with Motoko and some suspicious customers who do something that seems like sexual harassment, Yujiro is very pleased.

After closing time, Yujiro invites Motoko to an izakaya (pub) several times, confirms that she does not have a boyfriend, and takes her home in a taxi, gradually closing the distance between them. He even begins to think about marrying Motoko.

Finally, Yujiro goes to the izakaya with Motoko, with the engagement ring he bought with the rest of his inheritance in his pocket. However, the atmosphere starts to become awkward when Sakiko suddenly appears there. Sakiko, who has already sensed Yujiro's intention to marry Motoko and is opposed to it in her heart, begins to be hostile towards Motoko. Yujiro tries to bring the mood back to normal with harmless topics, but when the topic turns to Motoko's love life, she suddenly says that she had a sexual relationship with OZAWA, a customer who has been sexually harassing her, leaving Yujiro and Sakiko dumbfounded.

The next day, Yujiro's attitude towards Motoko becomes distant. Then, when OZAWA comes to the cafe and Yujiro sees him holding Motoko's hand as usual, he slaps him on the head, and the two get into a big fight. When the police arrive and Yujiro gets into the patrol car, Motoko says to Yujiro in a small voice, "I'm quitting this cafe," and Yujiro replies faintly, "Yeah, please."

After Motoko quits, the number of customers at the bar drops dramatically. Yujiro asks Asami to come back and serve customers in the clothes Motoko was wearing, but it has no effect.

After a while, Sakiko happens to meet Motoko on the street and they have tea at a coffee shop, this time, very amicably. Motoko tells Sakiko that she is going back to her hometown in Hokkaido that night and entrusts Sakiko with a letter addressed to Yujiro. Sakiko hands Motoko's letter to Yujiro, but Yujiro pretends to be indifferent. However, that night, Yujiro suddenly runs out of the shop and goes out on his bicycle to look for Motoko. However, he cannot meet Motoko and returns to the shop.

One year later, Sakiko is a high school senior and has already decided on her future as a culinary school student. One day, Sakiko happens to meet Motoko again on the street. Motoko is pregnant and her belly is getting bigger. Motoko explains that on that night a year ago, there was a problem with her ticket and she was unable to return to Hokkaido, and that she started dating a JR employee who told her about the ticket, and that she plans to get married soon.

After saying goodbye to Motoko, Sakiko goes to see the "site" of the Cafe Isobe. Yes, the cafe was closed down shortly after Motoko quit. Tears come to her eyes as she reminisces about the irritating but nostalgic memories. Then, Yujiro, who had just finished his work as a steeplejack, passes by on his bicycle and sees Sakiko. He asks her if she was crying. Sakiko runs off to hide the fact that she was crying, and Yujiro chases after her.

== Cast ==
- Hiroyuki MIYASAKO as Yujiro ISOBE
- Riisa NAKA as Sakiko ISOBE
- Kumiko ASO as Motoko SUGAWARA
- Mari HAMADA as Mugiko (Yujiro's ex-wife and Sakiko's mother)
- Haruna KONDO (of Harisembon) as Mami EGASHIRA
- Yosuke SAITO as SHIBATA (patron who is of Kumamoto origin)
- Dankan as OZAWA (patron)
- Mickey Curtis as HONGO (patron)
- Soko WADA as YASUDA (patron)
- Aoi YUKI as Kana (KANAZAWA), Sakiko's friend
- Yumika TAJIMA as Mana (MANABE), Sakiko's friend
- Nori HORIKOSHI as hostess at Yujiro's favorite cabaret club
- Toshihiro YASHIBA as owner of a coffee shop who intimately talks with a female customer
- Meiken ITO as Motoko's rough ex-boy friend
- Tetsunori AKIRA as master of izakaya
- Koji ABE and Ari ODORIKO as patrons
- Hajime TANIGUCHI as very thin patron
- Yutaka MISHIMA as cafe renovator
- Tomoya NAITO as delivery man from Sampei Foods Company
