= 13th Japan Film Professional Awards =

Japanese film awards in 2004

- Date: 2004

The 13th Japan Film Professional Awards (第13回日本映画プロフェッショナル大賞) is the 13th edition of the Japan Film Professional Awards. Films of 2003 were eligible, with a focus on independent works not released by major distribution companies. An award ceremony did not take place.

== Awards ==
- Best Film: Bright Future
- Best Director: Kiyoshi Kurosawa (Bright Future, Doppelganger)
- Best Actress: Chizuru Ikewaki (Josee, the Tiger and the Fish)
- Best Actress: Shinobu Terajima (Vibrator, Akame 48 Waterfalls)
- Best Actor: Joe Odagiri (Bright Future)
- Best Actor: Tatsuya Fuji (Bright Future, The Man in White)
- Best New Director: Miwa Nishikawa (Hebi Ichigo)

== 10 best films ==
1. Bright Future (Kiyoshi Kurosawa)
2. Vibrator (Ryūichi Hiroki)
3. Josee, the Tiger and the Fish (Isshin Inudo)
4. Baka no Hakobune (Nobuhiro Yamashita)
5. Sayonara, Kuro (Joji Matsuoka)
6. Akame 48 Waterfalls (Genjiro Arato)
7. A Snake of June (Shinya Tsukamoto)
8. Women in the Mirror (Yoshishige Yoshida)
9. A Boy's Summer in 1945 (Kazuo Kuroki)
9. 9 Souls (Toshiaki Toyoda)

Runner-up: Doppelganger (Kiyoshi Kurosawa)
