= 21st Japan Film Professional Awards =

Japanese film awards in 2012

- Date: May 26, 2012
- Site: Theatre Shinjuku, Tokyo, Japan

The 21st Japan Film Professional Awards (第21回日本映画プロフェッショナル大賞) was the 21st edition of the Japan Film Professional Awards. Films of 2011 which had not already won a major domestic film award were eligible. The ceremony took place on May 26, 2012 at Theatre Shinjuku in Tokyo.

== Awards ==
- Best Film: Kantoku Shikkaku
- Best Director: Amir Naderi (Cut)
- Best Actress: Nana Eikura (Tokyo Park, Life Back Then)
- Best Actor: Hidetoshi Nishijima (Cut)
- Best New Director: Hitoshi Ōne (Moteki)
- Best New Director: Kōji Maeda (Cannonball Wedlock)
- Special: Yoshinori Chiba (For production of Guilty of Romance.)
- Best Distinguished Service: Mako Midori (For The Egoists performance and her longtime work.)

== 10 best films ==
1. Kantoku Shikkaku (Katsuyuki Hirano)
2. Life Back Then (Takahisa Zeze)
3. Tokyo Park (Shinji Aoyama)
4. Guilty of Romance (Sion Sono)
5. Tada's Do-It-All House (Tatsushi Ōmori)
6. I Wish (Hirokazu Koreeda)
7. Hospitalité (Kōji Fukada)
8. The Egoists (Ryūichi Hiroki)
9. Shinsei Kamattechan Rock 'n' Roll wa Nariyamanai (Yu Irie)
9. Cannonball Wedlock (Kōji Maeda)
