= Air Doll =

2009 Japanese film

- Promotional poster
- Directed by: Hirokazu Kore-eda
- Screenplay by: Hirokazu Kore-eda
- Based on: Kuuki Ningyo by Yoshiie Gōda
- Produced by: Hirokazu Kore-eda; Toshiro Uratani
- Starring: Bae Doona; Arata; Itsuji Itao
- Cinematography: Pin Bing Lee
- Edited by: Hirokazu Kore-eda
- Music by: World's End Girlfriend
- Distributed by: Asmik Ace Entertainment; Fortissimo Films; Ocean Films
- Release date: 14 May 2009
- Running time: 112 minutes
- Country: Japan
- Language: Japanese
- Box office: $1,130,635

Air Doll (Japanese: 空気人形, Hepburn: Kūki Ningyō) is a 2009 Japanese drama film directed by Hirokazu Kore-eda. It is based on the manga series Kuuki Ningyo by Yoshiie Gōda, which was serialized in the seinen manga magazine Big Comic Original. It stars Bae Doona as an inflatable sex doll that develops consciousness and falls in love.

Air Doll debuted in the Un Certain Regard section at the 62nd Cannes Film Festival. It opened in Japanese cinemas on 26 September 2009. Kore-eda said the film is about the loneliness of urban life and the question of what it means to be human.

== Plot ==
Middle-aged Hideo lives alone with an inflatable sex doll he calls Nozomi. The doll is his closest companion; he dresses her, talks to her over dinner, takes her for walks in a wheelchair, and has sex with her.

While Hideo is at work, Nozomi comes to life. She dresses in her maid's outfit and explores the world outside their apartment with wonder. She takes a job in a video store and becomes romantically involved with one of the employees, Junichi. When she accidentally cuts herself and deflates, Junichi repairs the tear with adhesive tape and re-inflates her.

One day, Hideo visits the store; she serves him, embarrassed, but he does not recognise her. Her boss presumes that Hideo is her boyfriend and that she is cheating on Junichi, coercing Nozomi into sex. At their home, Hideo discovers Nozomi is no longer a doll. He asks her to return to lifelessness, as he finds human relationships "annoying". Hurt, she runs away.

Nozomi goes to the factory where she was manufactured and meets her maker. He tells her that he believes all the dolls have hearts, as he can tell from their faces when they are returned what kind of treatment they received. When she asks what happens to used dolls, he says he throws them out with the garbage.

Nozomi tells Junichi she will do whatever he wants for him. He asks to let out her air and re-inflate her as he did in the video store. Afterwards, as he sleeps, she attempts to return the favour; finding no plug, she cuts him with scissors, and attempts to stem the blood flow with adhesive tape. Junichi dies and she leaves his body with the garbage. Heartbroken, she removes the tape sealing her own wound and allows herself to deflate, to be collected with the garbage.

== Cast ==
- Bae Doona as Nozomi (Air Doll)
- Arata as Junichi
- Itsuji Itao as Hideo
- Joe Odagiri as Sonoda (the doll maker)
- Sumiko Fuji as Chiyoko
- Masaya Takahashi as Keiichi
- Susumu Terajima as Todoroki
- Kimiko Yo as Yoshiko

== Reception ==
On review aggregator website Rotten Tomatoes, Air Doll holds an approval rating of 63% based on 38 reviews, with an average rating of 5.6/10. It has a 65/100 average on Metacritic, based on 11 reviews.

Reaction to the film's debut screening at Cannes was mixed, with reviewers praising Bae Doona's performance but criticising the film for its length and a lack of substance. Screen International's Dan Fainaru described the film as having a "rather thin narrative core" and its director's approach as "too diffuse", but concluded that it could be "an enjoyable work" under the right conditions. Writing for Variety, Dan Ellery said the film would have potential if cut to about 90 minutes but that "in its present form, pic may not get much farther than the fest netherworld." In contrast, The Hollywood Reporter's Maggie Lee described it as "an achingly beautiful meditation on loneliness and longing in the city" and suggested its themes would particularly appeal to female audiences.

Air Doll was one of the five films praised by David Ehrlich in his contribution to IndieWire's 2018 list of the best Japanese films of the 21st century, with the others being Spirited Away (2001), Millennium Actress (2001), Nobody Knows (2004), and Linda Linda Linda (2005). Ehrlich described Air Doll as "criminally under-seen".

== Home media ==
The film was released on DVD in Japan on 26 March 2010, in standard and limited editions. Both editions include English subtitles. It was also released on Blu-Ray (Region A) on 28 June 2022. It is also available digitally as of 20 August 2022.
