= Tatsuki Fujimoto =

Japanese manga artist

Tatsuki Fujimoto 藤本 タツキ
- Born: October 10, 1992 (age 34); or; October 10, 1993 (age 33); (sources differ) Nikaho, Akita, Japan
- Area: Manga artist
- Notable works: Fire Punch; Chainsaw Man; Look Back; Goodbye, Eri
- Awards: Shogakukan Manga Award (2021); Harvey Awards (2021–2023)

Tatsuki Fujimoto (Japanese: 藤本 タツキ, Hepburn: Fujimoto Tatsuki; born October 10, 1992, or 1993 (Note: In 2017, Koharu Nagayama (Fujimoto himself under an alias, claiming to be his younger sister) wrote on Twitter that the author would be "24, 25 or 26 years old", and also that the author turned 25 that year. Shogakukan also stated that the author was born in 1992. However, according to Shihei Lin (Fujimoto's editor) and Shueisha, he was 17 in 2011 (turning 18 that year) when he sent his first one-shot work, and according to Oricon he was born in 1993.)) is a Japanese manga artist, known for his works Fire Punch and Chainsaw Man.

== Early life ==
Fujimoto was born on October 10, 1992, or 1993, in Nikaho, Akita Prefecture, Japan. He started drawing at an early age. He had no preparatory schools available near his home, so he went to painting classes in which his grandparents attended and practiced oil painting. He graduated in Western painting from Tohoku University of Art and Design in Yamagata, Yamagata Prefecture in 2014.

== Career ==
In 2011, Fujimoto drew his first submitted one-shot work, A Couple Clucking Chickens Were Still Kickin' in the Schoolyard (庭には二羽ニワトリがいた, Niwa ni wa Niwa Niwatori ga ita), which was nominated for the December Jump SQ. Monthly Award (it was later published on the Shōnen Jump+ online platform on July 17, 2017). Fujimoto's one-shot, Seigi no Mikata (正義の見方; "Sense of Justice"), was an entry work for the 10th Supreme Comic Grand Prize season II in 2013. His next one-shot work was Kami Hikōki (かみひこうき; "Paper Planes"), for which he won a Jury Special Award at the 3rd Shueisha's Crown Newcomers' Awards in 2013. Fujimoto's next one-shot work was Sasaki Stopped a Bullet (佐々木くんが銃弾止めた, Sasaki-kun ga Juudan Tometa), for which he won his second Jury Special Award at the 5th Shueisha's Crown Newcomers' Awards in 2013 (later published on Shōnen Jump+ on June 13, 2016).

Fujimoto's next work was Love is Blind (恋は盲目, Koi wa Mōmoku), for which he won an Honorable Mention Award at the November 2013 Shueisha's Crown Newcomers' Awards, and was his first published work, being launched in Jump SQ.19 vol. 13 on April 19, 2014. His next one-shot works were Shikaku (シカク), published in Jump SQ.19 vol. 14 on June 19, 2014; Mermaid Rhapsody (人魚ラプソディ, Ningyo Rapusodi), published in Jump SQ.19 vol. 17 on December 19, 2014; and Nayuta of the Prophecy (予言のナユタ, Yogen no Nayuta), published in Jump Square on July 4, 2015.

Fujimoto published his first major and serialized work, Fire Punch (ファイアパンチ, Faia Panchi), on Shueisha's Shōnen Jump+ online magazine, where it ran from April 18, 2016, to January 1, 2018. The series spawned eight tankōbon volumes. Fujimoto also published on Shōnen Jump+ the one-shot Woke-Up-as-a-Girl Syndrome (目が覚めたら女の子になっていた病, Me ga Sametara Onnanoko ni Natteita Yamai) on April 24, 2017, and the one-shot Sisters (妹の姉, Imōto no Ane) in the June 2018 issue of Jump Square on May 2, 2018.

Fujimoto's second major serialized work, Chainsaw Man (チェンソーマン, Chensō Man), was published in Shueisha's Weekly Shōnen Jump from December 3, 2018, to December 14, 2020. A second part was serialized in Shōnen Jump+ from July 13, 2022, to March 25, 2026. Chainsaw Man topped Takarajimasha's Kono Manga ga Sugoi! list of best manga of 2021 for male readers, and earned Fujimoto the 66th Shogakukan Manga Award for Best Shōnen Manga. In 2021, the manga won the Harvey Awards for Best Manga; it won the award for the second time in 2022; and for the third time in 2023.

Fujimoto illustrated the cover of the novels anthology 5-Minute Stories: An Unexpected End (5分で読める驚愕のラストの物語, Gofun de Yomeru Kyōgaku no Rasuto no Monogatari), released on April 2, 2021. Fujimoto participated as a guest judge at Shonen Jump+'s Million Tag online reality show in July 2021.

Fujimoto published the one-shot Look Back (ルックバック, Rukku Bakku) on Shōnen Jump+ on July 19, 2021. The chapter was collected by Shueisha in a single tankōbon volume, released on September 3, 2021. Look Back topped the Kono Manga ga Sugoi! 2022 list of best manga for male readers.

A two-volume collection of Fujimoto's previous one-shots, Tatsuki Fujimoto Before Chainsaw Man (藤本タツキ短編集, Fujimoto Tatsuki Tanpenshū; "Tatsuki Fujimoto's Short Stories"), subtitled 17–21 and 22–26, were released on October 4 and November 4, 2021, respectively. He illustrated the novel Chainsaw Man: Buddy Stories (チェンソーマン バディ・ストーリーズ, Chensō Man Badi Sutōrīzu), published on November 4, 2021. Fujimoto illustrated a version of one of the forty-two volumes of the Dragon Ball manga for the Dragon Ball Super Gallery Project, celebrating the series' 40th anniversary, which was published in Saikyō Jump on December 3, 2021.

Fujimoto published Goodbye, Eri (さよなら絵梨, Sayonara Eri), a 200-page one-shot, on Shōnen Jump+ on April 11, 2022. The chapter was collected by Shueisha in a single tankōbon volume, released on July 4, 2022.

Along with illustrator Oto Tōda, Fujimoto published the one-shot Just Listen to the Song (フツーに聞いてくれ, Futsū ni Kiitekure; "Listen to Me Normally") on Shōnen Jump+ on July 4, 2022.

== Influences ==
Fujimoto commented that he wanted to "draw manga like Korean films", citing the 2008 South Korean film The Chaser as example, stating: "the main character chases after the villain, but thirty minutes into the movie, he catches him. This is supposed to happen at the end of the movie, so you keep wondering what will happen next. A lot of people say that in Korean movies they cannot tell what the director is thinking, but actually, if you watch until the end, you will get it. I wanted to make something like that." He also mentioned the 2016 Japanese film Sadako vs. Kayako, Kōji Shiraishi's film series Senritsu Kaiki File Kowasugi!, the 2011 Indonesian film The Raid and Takeshi Kitano's work. He was also influenced by manga authors Hiroaki Samura, Hideki Arai, and Tsutomu Nihei. Fujimoto was inspired by the 1974 film The Texas Chain Saw Massacre to create Chainsaw Man.

== Works ==
=== Serialized manga ===
- Fire Punch (ファイアパンチ, Faia Panchi) (2016–2018) — Serialized in Shōnen Jump+ and published by Shueisha in eight volumes
- Chainsaw Man (チェンソーマン, Chensō Man) (2018–2026) — Serialized in Weekly Shōnen Jump (2018–2020) and Shōnen Jump+ (2022–2026); published by Shueisha in 24 volumes

=== One-shots ===
- Seigi no Mikata (正義の見方; "Sense of Justice") (2013); unpublished
- Kami Hikouki (かみひこうき; "Paper Planes") (2013); unpublished
- Tatsuki Fujimoto Before Chainsaw Man (藤本タツキ短編集, Fujimoto Tatsuki Tanpenshū; "Tatsuki Fujimoto's Short Stories") (2021); two collected volumes of Fujimoto's earliest one-shots
  - A Couple Clucking Chickens Were Still Kickin' in the Schoolyard (庭には二羽ニワトリがいた, Niwa ni wa Niwa Niwatori ga ita) (2011)
  - Sasaki Stopped a Bullet (佐々木くんが銃弾止めた, Sasaki-kun ga Juudan Tometa) (2013)
  - Love is Blind (恋は盲目, Koi wa Moumoku) (2013); later published in Jump SQ.19
  - Shikaku (シカク) (2014); published in Jump SQ.19
  - Mermaid Rhapsody (人魚ラプソディ, Ningyo Rhapsody) (2014); published in Jump SQ.19
  - Nayuta of the Prophecy (予言のナユタ, Yogen no Nayuta) (2015); published in Jump Square
  - Woke-Up-as-a-Girl Syndrome (目が覚めたら女の子になっていた病, Me ga Sametara Onnanoko ni Natteita Yamai) (2017); published in Shōnen Jump+
  - Sisters (妹の姉, Imōto no Ane) (2018); published in Jump Square
- Look Back (ルックバック, Rukku Bakku) (2021); published in Shōnen Jump+ and collected in one volume
- Goodbye, Eri (さよなら絵梨, Sayonara Eri) (2022); published in Shōnen Jump+ and collected in one volume
- Just Listen to the Song (フツーに聞いてくれ, Futsū ni Kiitekure; "Listen to Me Normally") (2022); illustrated by Oto Tōda; published in Shōnen Jump+

== Assistants ==
- Yuji Kaku
- Oto Tōda
- Tatsuya Endo
- Yukinobu Tatsu
- Tohru Kuramori
