= Itoshi no Irene =

Japanese manga series

- First tankōbon volume cover

愛しのアイリーン
- Manga
- Written by: Hideki Arai
- Published by: Shogakukan
- Magazine: Weekly Big Comic Spirits
- Original run: 1995 – 1996
- Volumes: 6
- Live-action film
- Directed by: Keisuke Yoshida
- Written by: Keisuke Yoshida
- Released: September 14, 2018
- Runtime: 137 minutes
- icon

Itoshi no Irene (愛しのアイリーン; "Beloved Irene") is a Japanese manga series written and illustrated by Hideki Arai. It was serialized in Shogakukan's seinen manga magazine Weekly Big Comic Spirits from 1995 to 1996, with its chapters collected in six tankōbon volumes. It was adapted into a live action film, which premiered in Japan in September 2018.

== Media ==
=== Manga ===
Written and illustrated by Hideki Arai, Itoshi no Irene was serialized in Shogakukan's seinen manga magazine Weekly Big Comic Spirits from 1995 to 1996. Shogakukan collected its chapters in six tankōbon volumes, released from September 30, 1995, to November 30, 1996. Daitosha republished the series in two volumes on December 5, 2003. Ohta Publishing republished the series in a two-volume edition, which included a 16-page epilogue chapter, on December 15, 2010, and January 20, 2011.

==== Volumes ====
No.	Japanese release date	Japanese ISBN
1	September 30, 1995	4-09-184001-9
2	December 19, 1995	4-09-184002-7
3	March 30, 1996	4-09-184003-5
4	May 30, 1996	4-09-184004-3
5	August 30, 1996	4-09-184005-1
6	November 30, 1996	4-09-184006-X

=== Live action film ===
A live action film adaptation was announced in February 2018. The film, directed by Keisuke Yoshida, stars Ken Yasuda as Iwao Shishido and Philippine actress Nats Sitoy as Irene Gonzalez. The film premiered in Japan on September 14, 2018.
