= Nikkan Sports Film Special Award =

Annual Japanese film award

- Country: Japan
- Presented by: Nikkan Sports
- First award: 1988
- Website: www.nikkansports.com/entertainment/award/ns-cinema/top-ns-cinema.html

The Nikkan Sports Film Special Award is an award given at the Nikkan Sports Film Awards.

== List of winners ==
| No. | Year | Actor | Film |
|---|---|---|---|
| 1 | 1988 | N/A | N/A |
| 2 | 1989 | Hibari Misora; Yūsaku Matsuda | |
| 3 | 1990 | Seiko Matsuda | Docchi mo Docchi |
| 4 | 1991 | Tadashi Imai | Sensō to Seishun |
| 5 | 1992 | N/A | N/A |
| 6 | 1993 | Kinichi Hagimoto | Kinchan no Cinema Jack |
| 7 | 1994 | N/A | N/A |
| 8 | 1995 | Nobuko Otowa | His career |
| 9 | 1996 | Kiyoshi Atsumi | His career |
| 10 | 1997 | N/A | N/A |
| 11 | 1998 | Akira Kurosawa | His career |
| 12 | 1999 | N/A | N/A |
| 13 | 2000 | N/A | N/A |
| 14 | 2001 | N/A | N/A |
| 15 | 2002 | N/A | N/A |
| 16 | 2003 | N/A | N/A |
| 17 | 2004 | N/A | N/A |
| 18 | 2005 | N/A | N/A |
| 19 | 2006 | Shohei Imamura | His career |
| 20 | 2007 | N/A | N/A |
| 21 | 2008 | N/A | N/A |
| 22 | 2009 | Hisaya Morishige | His career |
| 23 | 2010 | N/A | N/A |
| 24 | 2011 | N/A | N/A |
| 25 | 2012 | Kaneto Shindo | His career |
| 26 | 2013 | N/A | N/A |
| 27 | 2014 | Ken Takakura | His career |
| 28 | 2015 | Yūkichi Shinada | His career |
| 29 | 2016 | N/A | N/A |
| 30 | 2017 | N/A | N/A |
| 31 | 2018 | N/A | N/A |
| 32 | 2019 | N/A | N/A |
| 33 | 2020 | Tetsuya Watari | His career |
| 34 | 2021 | N/A | N/A |
| 35 | 2022 | N/A | N/A |
| 36 | 2023 | N/A | N/A |
| 37 | 2024 | Toshiyuki Nishida | His career |
| 38 | 2025 | N/A | N/A |
