= Saudade (film) =

2011 film

- Theatrical release poster
- Directed by: Katsuya Tomita
- Written by: Toranosuke Aizawa; Katsuya Tomita
- Produced by: Kōtarō Date; Tomomi Tomita
- Starring: Wesley Bandeira; Chie Kudô; Chika Kumada
- Cinematography: Takako Takano
- Edited by: Takako Takano; Katsuya Tomita
- Music by: Stillichimiya
- Release dates: 25 June 2011 (Locarno); 22 October 2011 (Japan)
- Running time: 167 minutes
- Country: Japan
- Language: Japanese

Saudade (Japanese: サウダーヂ, Hepburn: Saudāji) is a 2011 Japanese comedy film directed by Katsuya Tomita.

== Cast ==
- Wesley Bandeira
- Chie Kudô
- Chika Kumada
- Shinji Miyadai
- Tomohito Nakajima
- Ai Ozaki
- Fabiano Salgado
- Ayano Sekine
- Yasushi Sumida
- Tsuyoshi Takano
- Tomoko Takeda

== Production ==
This film was produced on a low budget of 15 million yen, including a donation of 5 million yen. Director Katsuya Tomita, who was also a truck driver at the time, shot the film on weekends in his hometown of Kōfu, Yamanashi Prefecture. It took a year and a half to complete.
