= Melancholic (film) =

- Film poster
- Directed by: Seiji Tanaka
- Written by: Seiji Tanaka
- Produced by: Yoji Minagawa
- Starring: Yoji Minagawa; Yoshitomo Isozaki; Mebuki Yoshida; Stefanie Arianne; Yuta Okubo; Takanori Kamachi; Keiji Yamashita; Hiroko Shinkai; Makoto Hada; Masanobu Yada; Yasuyaki Hasamaya
- Cinematography: Ryo Takahashi
- Edited by: Seiji Tanaka
- Production company: One Goose
- Distributed by: UPLINK Company; Jingumae Produce Company; One Goose
- Release dates: October 2018 (Tokyo International Film Festival); 3 August 2019
- Running time: 114 minutes
- Country: Japan
- Language: Japanese
- Budget: ¥3,000,000

Melancholic (Japanese: メランコリック) is a 2018 Japanese crime comedy-drama film directed by Seiji Tanaka, starring Yoji Minagawa, Yoshitomo Isozaki and Mebuki Yoshida. Tanaka's directorial debut, it follows a university graduate who begins working part-time at a bathhouse, only to discover that the building is owned by a gangster who uses it as a space for murder and body disposal.

== Cast ==
- Yoji Minagawa as Kazuhiko Nabeoka
- Yoshitomo Isazaki as Matsumoto
- Mebuki Yoshida as Soejima Yuri
- Stefanie Arianne as Angela Yen
- Yuta Okubo as Tamura
- Takanori Kamachi as Sekine
- Keiji Yamashita as Shûichi Nabeoka
- Hiroko Shinkai as Keiko Nabeoka
- Makoto Hada as Azuma
- Masanobu Yada as Tanaka
- Yasuyaki Hasamaya as Kodera

== Production ==
The film was produced by One Goose, a collective founded by and comprising Seiji Tanaka, Yoji Minagawa and Yoshitomo Isozaki. Tanaka and Isozaki met through the theatre department of the Nihon University College of Art, and the two later met Minagawa. In March 2017, Minagawa approached Tanaka, asking him to write and direct a feature-length film he wanted to make at an izakaya in Nakano, Tokyo. Tanaka accepted the offer, and Isozaki was approached for the project soon after. One Goose was formed in the Winter of 2017 for the project.

Minagawa initially suggested that Tanaka write and direct an action film. Though the latter did initially consider doing so, he felt that it would be difficult to create something original within that genre. As such, he decided against having the film's genre be purely action. It was then that he came up with the idea of having the protagonist be a cleaner who takes care of the crime scene after the action has already taken place. To procure the funds required for the film, it was decided that they would first produce a short film on the concept. The 15-minute short film revolved around two individuals who are paid to dispose of bodies. It was screened at a film festival in Kyoto, though it did not receive a theatrical release.

For the feature film, they struggled with finding a suitable filming location. Isozaki then suggested a public bathhouse be the setting. Tanaka felt that it made sense as a location for body disposal. Tanaka named the television series Breaking Bad as an inspiration for the project. The film Whiplash served as an inspiration for the protagonist's relationship with his parents. The cast was primarily made up of associates of Minagawa, with the only exception being Makoto Hada. He was cast in the role of Azuma, the bathhouse owner, after an audition. The film was made on a budget of roughly ¥3,000,000. It was shot over 10 days and filmed only on the weekends as Tanaka worked full-time during the week at an IT company. Due to the project's low budget, several of its cast and staff played multiple roles, including Minagawa, who also served as a producer. Shooting primarily took place at the Matsu no Yu public bathhouse in Urayasu city in Chiba Prefecture. According to Ninagawa, who negotiated the filming location, the bathhouse's owner was "very understanding" and allowed them to use the building "freely" for filming. To prepare for his role, Minagawa went to the Akamon to observe University of Tokyo students. The editing process was completed on the morning of the submissions deadline for the Tokyo International Film Festival.

== Release ==
The film premiered as part of the Japanese Cinema Splash section at the 31st Tokyo International Film Festival at the end of October 2018. It screened at the Kohan Film Festival at Lake Motosu in July 2019. The film opened in four theatres in Japan on 3 August 2019. The film quickly became a "smash hit", selling out at the Uplink Shibuya and Uplink Kichijoji theatres on its first day. The following month it was announced that its release would be expanded to over 40 theatres across the country. It was released to Blu-ray and DVD on 3 July 2020.

== Reception ==
Hideyuki Nakazawa and Naoto Mori of Cinema Today individually rated the film 5 stars out of 5, while Harumi Nakayama and Hiroaki Saito both gave the film a 4/5 star rating. Nakazawa considered it an "unexpected masterpiece" and called it a "thrilling and refreshing coming-of-age drama brimming with love and friendship." Nakayama praised the base premise and felt that it established Tanaka as a "promising new talent", though she felt that the score did not fit the film at times. Saito lauded the lead performance and the "skilful" storytelling. A critic from Cinemarche praised the direction and the performances and called it a "meticulously drawn and layered depiction of everyday life."

Mark Schilling of The Japan Times rated the film 4 stars out of 5 and called it "extraordinarily well made" and "darkly funny, viscerally thrilling and improbably heartwarming, all without departing far from the stark immediacy of its opening scenes." He felt that the characters are "baseline likable, even when doing the dirtiest of dirty work." Schilling praised the "spot on" performance and opined that the film is "taut, without a single wasted moment". Andrew Daley of EasternKicks rated the film 4 stars out of 5 and lauded the lead performance, writing that it was the film's "strongest" aspect. Daley noted that the film is a "constant exercise in challenging audience expectations and the conventions of society thrust upon individuals" and it is here where Tanaka "comes across strongest." Roxy Simons, also of EasternKicks, considered it an "unexpectedly powerful" and "well-acted" drama which "blends genres with finesse." It was included on the website's list of the top 10 best films of 2019 by Pieter-Jan Van Haecke.

Kurei Hibiki of Cinema Today was more reserved in his praise, giving the film a 3/5 star rating. He found the central premise unrealistic and the direction "far too monotonous" at times. Akash Deshpande of High on Films was far more critical of the film, giving it a rating of 2.5/5 stars. Deshpande opined that while it "brings different elements to the table that try to elevate it, occasionally to a more surreal ground", the screenplay "can’t sustain the required tension leaving the film with only a few admirable points." He felt that it could have been "tighter" and that the resolution "hardly feels earned". However, Deshpande noted that the characterisation was compelling and that Minagawa's performance is "more than impressive".

Melancholic was also well-received in film festivals outside Japan. It won the White Mulberry Award at the Udine Far East Film Festival and the Best Director Award in the Japanese Cinema Splash section of the Tokyo International Film Festival. The film received the Silver Award at the 2019 Kaneto Shindo Awards, held in November. The same year, it won the Nippon Visions Audience Award at the Nippon Connection film festival in Frankfurt am Main and the Audience Award at the Japan Cuts film festival. For his performance, Minagawa was nominated for the Newcomer of the Year (Male) Award at the 74th Mainichi Film Awards.

Following its release, numerous critics drew comparisons between the film and One Cut of the Dead, another independent Japanese film which had premiered a year before Melancholic, sometimes considering it a successor or a "second One Cut of the Dead." Tanaka disliked the notion that they had made the film with One Cut of the Dead in mind, noting that that film had not been released yet when production on Melancholic began, though he noted that such comparisons had likely attracted filmgoers and aided its success.
