= Young Thugs: Nostalgia =

1998 film by Takashi Miike

- DVD cover
- Directed by: Takashi Miike
- Screenplay by: Masa Nakamura
- Based on: Kishiwada shōnen gurentai: Bōkyō by Riichi Nakaba
- Produced by: Yasuhiko Furusato; Masao Kimura; Toshiaki Nakazawa
- Cinematography: Hideo Yamamoto
- Edited by: Yasushi Shimamura
- Music by: Kōji Endō
- Distributed by: Artsmagic Ltd. (US); Shochiku Company (Japan)
- Release date: September 26, 1998 (Japan)
- Running time: 94 minutes
- Country: Japan
- Language: Japanese

Young Thugs: Nostalgia (Japanese: 岸和田少年愚連隊・望郷, Hepburn: Kishiwada Shōnen Gurentai: Bōkyō) is a 1998 Japanese film directed by Takashi Miike. It is based on the autobiographical novel Kishiwada shōnen gurentai: Bōkyō written by Riichi Nakaba. It is the prequel to the 1997 film Young Thugs: Innocent Blood.

== Plot ==
Riichi's life begins with his father Toshi winning money betting on the gender of his child, then naming him after a move in the game of Japanese Mahjong. When Riichi wins a fight, his family gets him drunk and the next day he vomits into his recorder during class. His teacher Miss Itō visits his home and witnesses his father Toshi abusing his mother. Toshi begins sleeping with the stripper Akemi.
Riichi's friend Kotetsu's grandmother searches in vain for her paints in the river and is eventually put in a care home. Riichi and Gasu accompany Kotetsu as he runs away from home in Osaka in an attempt to reach his brother's place in Shikoku. They quickly run out of money and are forced to return home.
The first prize of the school competition is paints and Riichi resolves to win them for Kotetsu's grandmother. They steal supplies and build a life-size replica of the Apollo Lunar Module but Riichi's rival Sada and his gang destroy it. Riichi and Kotetsu but up the other gang and force them to rebuild the replica. It wins first prize and they attempt to give the paints to Kotetsu's grandmother but find her dead at the spot by the river where she was searching.
Factories are built over where the pillars of the community once stood. Riichi fights with Sada at the construction site as his father Toshi returns from participating in protests against the government. When Riichi returns home and finds his mother gone, he assumes that Toshi has abused his mother again and the two begin fighting. His mother returns home and Toshi invites Riichi to the cycling races with him.

== Cast ==
- Takeshi Caesar as Riichi's uncle
- Setsuko Karasuma as Riichi's mother
- Yuki Nagata as Riichi Nakaba
- Toshikazu Nakaba
- Akihiro Shimizu as Nakamura
- Matsunosuke Shofukutei as Riichi's grandfather
- Saki Takaoka as Miss Itō
- Naoto Takenaka as Riichi's father Toshi
- Yoshinori Yasuda as Sada

== Other credits ==
- Sound Department: Yoshiya Obara - sound
- Assistant Director: Bunmei Katō

== Reception ==
Reviewer Grant Watson of Fictionmachine called the film "an act of nostalgia looking back to Miike’s own childhood as much as Riichi’s. It is a somewhat loose and messy film, without a particularly strong narrative through-line, but when it does work it is marvellous. It’s scattershot but amiable, and absolutely sparks with Miike’s own distinctive style."

Reviewer of Asian Movie Pulse called it a "touching and heartfelt portrayal of childhood and growing up".

Reviewer John Charles of Digital HK Movies wrote, "The narrative is leisurely but involving, thanks to the characters’ peculiar interaction and the setting, which contrasts the student riots in Tokyo with the local excitement over the Apollo 11 mission" and that "one leaves NOSTALGIA feeling fulfilled, thanks to the estimable performances (the children are particularly good) and Miike’s deft approach, which is evident in almost every scene."

Michael Den Boer of 10kbullets.com called it "a character driven film that really showcases Miike’s talents as a director."

Calvin McMillin of LoveHKFilm.com called it "a strangely endearing coming-of-age story from the always interesting Takashi Miike" and "far more compelling than most films of its type."

In his book Agitator: The Cinema of Takashi Miike, author Tom Mes wrote that the film "is the apogee of Miike’s depiction of the childhood idyll."
