= Miyamoto kara Kimi e =

Japanese manga series

- First tankōbon volume cover

宮本から君へ
- Manga
- Written by: Hideki Arai
- Published by: Kodansha
- Magazine: Morning
- Original run: 1990 – 1994
- Volumes: 12
- Television drama
- Directed by: Tetsuya Mariko
- Written by: Tetsuya Mariko
- Music by: Shoji Ikenaga
- Studio: TV Tokyo; Shochiku Studio
- Original network: TV Tokyo
- Original run: April 7, 2018 – June 30, 2018
- Episodes: 12
- Live-action film
- Directed by: Tetsuya Mariko
- Written by: Tetsuya Mariko; Takehiko Minato
- Music by: Shoji Ikenaga
- Studio: Miyamoto kara Kimi e SPC; Star Sands; Kadokawa Corporation
- Released: September 27, 2019
- Runtime: 129 minutes
- icon

Miyamoto kara Kimi e (Japanese: 宮本から君へ; lit. 'From Miyamoto to You') is a Japanese manga series written and illustrated by Hideki Arai. It was serialized in Kodansha's seinen manga magazine Morning from 1990 to 1994, with its chapters collected in 12 tankōbon volumes. It was adapted into television drama that aired on TV Tokyo from April to June 2018, followed by a live action film which premiered in September 2019. In 1993, Miyamoto kara Kimi e won the 38th Shogakukan Manga Award in the general category.

== Media ==
=== Manga ===
Written and illustrated by Hideki Arai, Miyamoto kara Kimi e was serialized in Kodansha's seinen manga magazine Morning from 1990 to 1994. Kodansha collected its chapters in twelve tankōbon volumes, released from July 19, 1991, to November 18, 1994; they republished in six volumes from September 20 to November 19, 1999. Ohta Publishing republished the series in a new edition of four volumes, under the title Sadamoto Miyamoto kara Kimi e (定本 宮本から君へ), from January 17 to April 16, 2009.

=== Drama ===
In March 2018, it was announced that the manga would receive a television drama adaptation. It was broadcast on TV Tokyo from April 7 to June 30, 2018. (Note: TV Tokyo listed the air dates for the series on Friday at 24:52, which is effectively Saturday at 0:25 a.m. JST.)

=== Live-action film ===
The television drama series was followed by a live-action film, which premiered in Japan on September 27, 2019.

== Reception ==
In 1993, alongside Ichimaru's Okami-san, Miyamoto kara Kimi e won the 38th Shogakukan Manga Award in the general category.
