= Tetsuya Mariko =

Japanese film director

- 真利子哲也
- Born: July 12, 1981 (age 45); Tokyo
- Occupation: Film director

Tetsuya Mariko (born July 12, 1981) is a Japanese filmmaker.

He graduated from Hosei University with a Japanese literature major. His masters is from Tokyo University of the Arts with a degree in film production.

== Biography ==
Mariko was born on July 12, 1981, in Tokyo, Japan. He began making short films while at Hosei University. He produced The Far East Apartment in 2003 and Mariko's 30 Pirates in 2004, and won the Grand Prix at the Yubari International Fantastic Film Festival two years in a row, as well as the Grand Prix at the 7th Kyoto International Student Film Festival, earning awards at a total of nine film festivals and received critical acclaim. He made Yellow Kid, his first feature-length film, while a graduate student at the Graduate School of Film and New Media at Tokyo University of the Arts. He won the New Director Grand Prix at Takasaki Film Festival and the New Directors Award at the Japanese Film Professionals Awards for this film. It also received high acclaim at international film festivals, such as Vancouver International Film Festival, International Film Festival Rotterdam, and Hong Kong International Film Festival. It achieved the rare feat of general theatrical release despite being a thesis film.

In 2011, his work NINIFUNI was selected for a special screening at the 64th Locarno International Film Festival, which is uncommon for a medium-length film.

In 2016, Mariko made his commercial film debut with Destruction Babies, which won the Best New Director Award at the 69th Locarno International Film Festival and the Silver Montgolfiere Award at the 38th Three Continents Film Festival. Domestically, he won the New Director Award at the 38th Yokohama Film Festival and received high praise for his film.

In 2018, he adapted a manga series Miyamoto into a TV series and served as the showrunner and director. The following year, there was a film adaptation where he was the director and co-writer.

In April 2019, Mariko spent a one-year residency as a visiting artist at Harvard University’s Reischauer Institute of Japanese Studies through the Emerging Artists Overseas Training Program. That same year, the film Miyamoto received high acclaim and won the Director’s Award at the 62nd Blue Ribbon Awards, the 32nd Nikkan Sports Film Awards, and the 34th Takasaki Film Festival.

== Filmography ==
=== Feature films ===
- Yellow Kid (2009)
- Destruction Babies (2016)
- Miyamoto (2019)
- Dear Stranger (2025)

=== Short and medium-length films ===
- Hozo (2001)
- The Far East Apartment (2003)
- A Life Without Cars (2004)
- Mariko’s 30 Pirates (2004)
- Nichola’s Bridge (2007)
- Ninifuni (2011)
- Fun Fair (2012, filmed in Malaysia)
- Mayday (2020, from the anthology film, State of Emergency)
- Coyote (2021, part of the CINEMA FIGHTERS Project, Redder Than Yesterday, Bluer Than Tomorrow)

=== Television ===
- Asunaro Sanjo! (2013, NOTTV)
- No Con Kid #09 True Love Story (2013, TV Tokyo)
- Dias Police: Foreign Police (2016, TBS)
- Miyamoto (2018, TV Tokyo) - Writer-director for all 12 episodes.

== Awards ==
2010

- 20th Japanese Film Professional Awards - Best New Director for Yellow Kid
- 25th Takasaki Film Festival - Young Director Grand Prize for Yellow Kid

2016

- 69th Locarno International Film Festival - Best New Director Award in New Directors Competition for Destruction Babies
- 38th Three Continents Film Festival - Silver Montgolfiere Award for Destruction Babies
- 38th Yokohama Film Festival - Best New Director for Destruction Babies

2018

- 56th Galaxy Award for the Television Section - Encouragement Award for Miyamoto - the TV series

2019

- 32nd Nikkan Sports Film Awards - Best Director for Miyamoto
- 34th Takasaki Film Festival - Best Director for Miyamoto
- 62nd Blue Ribbon Awards - Best Director for Miyamoto
