= Hideki Arai =

Japanese manga artist

Hideki Arai (新井 英樹, Arai Hideki) (born 15 September 1963 in Kanagawa Prefecture) is a Japanese manga artist. He received the 38th Shogakukan Manga Award for general manga in 1993 for Miyamoto kara Kimi e. His manga The World Is Mine was chosen by the editors of Pulp for their Manga Hell list of controversial manga.

He attended Kawawa High School and graduated from the Meiji University.

== Works ==
- Hachigatsu no Hikari (1 volume)
- Miyamoto kara Kimi e (12 volumes)
- Amanatsu (short story collection, 1 volume)
- Itoshi no Irene (6 volumes originally, reprinted in 2)
- The World Is Mine (14 volumes, reprinted in 5)
- Kiichi!! (9 volumes)
- Sugar (8 volumes)
- Rin (4 volumes, serialized in Bessatsu Young Magazine - sequel to Sugar)
- Kiichi VS (11 volumes, serialized in Big Comic Superior)
- Scatter: Wish you Were Here (5 volumes)
- Kuuya Shounin ga Ita (1 volume)
- Sekai, World, Sekai (1 volume)
- Nagisa Nite (3 volumes)
- Kiss: Kyoujin, Sora wo Tobu (3 volumes)
- Hito no Ko (2 volumes)
- Spunk (4 volumes)
