= Fire Punch =

Japanese manga series by Tatsuki Fujimoto

- First tankōbon volume cover, featuring Agni

ファイアパンチ (Faia Panchi)
- Genre: Dark fantasy; Dystopian; Supernatural thriller
- Manga
- Written by: Tatsuki Fujimoto
- Published by: Shueisha
- English publisher: NA: Viz Media
- Imprint: Jump Comics+
- Magazine: Shōnen Jump+
- Original run: April 18, 2016 – January 1, 2018
- Volumes: 8
- icon

Fire Punch (Japanese: ファイアパンチ, Hepburn: Faia Panchi) is a Japanese web manga series written and illustrated by Tatsuki Fujimoto. It was serialized through Shueisha's Shōnen Jump+ website from April 2016 to January 2018, with its chapters collected in eight tankōbon volumes. In North America, Viz Media licensed the manga for English release.

Fire Punch takes place on an Earth that has become frozen over and barren. The series follows Agni, a young man who is able to regenerate his body. After his village succumbs to inextinguishable flames he is left constantly on fire, leaving him in anguish and vowing to get revenge.

== Plot ==
In a future where Earth has been engulfed by an endless winter, the world is said to have been rendered barren by the Ice Witch, one of the few beings possessing extraordinary abilities known as "Blessings". Among them are Agni and his sister Luna, both gifted with the Blessing of regeneration. In their isolated village, they aid the elderly by offering the meat of Agni's severed limbs for sustenance. When a man named Doma, another Blessed, arrives and offers to take Agni to the city of Behemdorg, he reacts with revulsion upon discovering the villagers' reliance on cannibalism. In response, he annihilates the settlement using his Blessing: inextinguishable fire, burning its inhabitants alive—including Luna, who dies due to her regeneration being slower than Agni's. Though left in a state of perpetual combustion, Agni survives, spending eight years recovering his strength while consumed by vengeance.

During his quest for retribution, Agni encounters Sun, a boy with the Blessing of electricity who reveres him as a deity. He also crosses paths with Judah, a Blessed soldier whose resemblance to Luna unnerves him. After a violent confrontation, Judah subdues Agni, intending to deliver him to Behemdorg, where Sun has been imprisoned to power the city. Agni reunites with Doma, who seeks forgiveness but refuses to die in atonement. On a train bound for Behemdorg, Togata, a regenerative Blessed and passionate cinephile, intervenes, slaughtering the soldiers and persuading Agni to be filmed and become the protagonist of Togata's film, to which he agrees in exchange for training. Upon reaching the city, Agni's flames engulf Behemdorg, reducing it to ruins and liberating its enslaved populace. Judah, now purposeless, attempts self-immolation in Agni's fire, but the Ice Witch intervenes, decapitating her and absconding with her head.

The Ice Witch, Sulya, revives Judah, placing her under mental control. She reveals that they are both "Evolved", an advanced form of humanity with abilities surpassing ordinary Blessings. Sulya intends to end the ice age by transforming Judah into a "World Tree" that will consume all life to warm the planet. Meanwhile, in an abandoned village, Agni becomes an unwilling leader of freed slaves who worship him as the "Fire Punch". Togata aids in sustaining the community, even as Agni offers his flesh for their survival. Learning that Behemdorg's remnants, including Doma, are nearby. Togata, revealed to be a trans man, departs, though Agni pursues him. Struggling to comprehend Togata's identity, Agni eventually accepts him as an older sibling, reconciling their bond.

Agni confronts Doma, now raising children with ideals of compassion and pacifism. Doma justifies his past actions as an attempt to prevent moral degradation through cannibalism. Though momentarily swayed, Agni is overwhelmed by memories of Luna's death and slaughters Doma and several children in a fugue state. Wracked with guilt, he attempts suicide but is saved by Togata, who perishes in the process. Returning to the village, Agni discovers a colossal tree where Judah has absorbed the life force of his followers, the "Agnists". Trapped within the World Tree, Judah pleads for death to escape Sulya's control. Agni obliges, but her powers extinguish his flames, halting his regeneration. Though she survives, her memories are lost, and Agni names her Luna. They settle in a salt mine with survivors from Doma's group, though Agni's sanity deteriorates over time. Judah eventually realizes Agni is not her brother, and they form a romantic relationship.

Meanwhile, Sun ascends to a messianic role among the Agnists. Judah is abducted as Sulya convinces Sun that her sacrifice is necessary to warm the world. However, after a dispute over the direction of the world to come, Sun beheads Sulya in Agni's name. Agni succumbs to his "Fire Punch" persona, pursuing the Agnists to rescue Judah/Luna. In the ensuing conflict, Sun perishes, and Judah damages Agni's brain, erasing his memories before completing the World Tree ritual.

Eighty years later, the Earth begins to thaw. Agni, now known as Sun, lives quietly near the base of Judah's tree. He is given Togata's camera, though the corrupted footage—silent and monochrome—holds no meaning for him. Centuries pass, and Judah, still within the tree, forgets her past entirely. Millennia later, as Earth is destroyed by an asteroid, she wonders if she will remain trapped forever. In the distant future, long after the universe's death, a man resembling Agni appears beside her. Introducing themselves as Sun and Luna, though neither recognizes the other, they embrace and drift into slumber. Elsewhere, two figures resembling Agni and Luna exit an empty cinema.

== Publication ==
Written and illustrated by Tatsuki Fujimoto, Fire Punch was published on Shueisha's Shōnen Jump+ website from April 18, 2016, to January 1, 2018. Shueisha collected its chapters in eight tankōbon volumes, released from July 4, 2016, to February 2, 2018.

In North America, the manga has been licensed for English release by Viz Media. The eight volumes were published under the Viz Signature imprint from January 16, 2018, to October 15, 2019.

=== Volumes ===
| No. | Original release date | Original ISBN | English release date | English ISBN |
|---|---|---|---|---|
| 1 | July 4, 2016 | 978-4-08-880731-7 | January 16, 2018 | 978-1-4215-9717-1 |
Chapters 1–8
| 2 | October 4, 2016 | 978-4-08-880797-3 | April 17, 2018 | 978-1-4215-9718-8 |
Chapters 9–18
| 3 | December 2, 2016 | 978-4-08-880873-4 | July 17, 2018 | 978-1-4215-9719-5 |
Chapters 19–28
| 4 | March 3, 2017 | 978-4-08-881014-0 | October 16, 2018 | 978-1-4215-9808-6 |
Chapters 29–39
| 5 | June 2, 2017 | 978-4-08-881061-4 | January 15, 2019 | 978-1-4215-9944-1 |
Chapters 40–49
| 6 | August 4, 2017 | 978-4-08-881147-5 | April 16, 2019 | 978-1-9747-0039-4 |
Chapters 50–60
| 7 | November 2, 2017 | 978-4-08-881170-3 | July 16, 2019 | 978-1-9747-0451-4 |
Chapters 61–71
| 8 | February 2, 2018 | 978-4-08-881327-1 | October 15, 2019 | 978-1-9747-0452-1 |
Chapters 72–83

== Reception ==
When Fire Punch began serialization, it received little advertising due to a tight budget, and expectations for its success were low. However, shortly after the first chapter's release, the series gained sudden popularity on social media, even trending on Twitter. According to Shōnen Jump+ chief editor Shuhei Hosono, this was the first time in his 16-year career at Shueisha that a manga had spread so quickly and become a major online discussion. Hosono also credited Fire Punch and World's End Harem with driving a surge in Shōnen Jump+'s user base in Q2 2016, as weekly active readers jumped from 1.1 million to 1.3 million.

In 2017, Fire Punch was nominated for the 10th Manga Taishō. The series ranked 15th on the "Nationwide Bookstore Employees' Recommended Comics of 2017" poll by Honya Club online bookstore. It also ranked third on Takarajimasha's Kono Manga ga Sugoi! list of best manga of 2017 for male readers.

== See also ==
- List of webcomics with LGBTQ characters
