= Japanese Professional Movie Awards =

Annual Japanese film award

- Awarded for: Excellence in film making
- Country: Japan
- Presented by: Hiroo Ōtaka
- First award: 1991
- Website: https://nichipro-award.com/

The Japanese Professional Movie Awards (Japanese: 日本映画プロフェッショナル大賞, Hepburn: Nihon Eiga Purofesshonaru Taishō) are an annual Japanese film award. The first awards were given to films made in 1991. This award is hosted by Hiroo Ōtaka.

== Categories ==
- Best Film
- Best Director
- Best Actor
- Best Actress

== Editions ==
- 1st (1991)
- 2nd (1992)
- 3rd (1993)
- 4th (1994)
- 5th (1995)
- 6th (1996)
- 7th (1997)
- 8th (1998)
- 9th (1999)
- 10th (2000)
- 11th (2001)
- 12th (2002)
- 13th (2003)
- 14th (2004)
- 15th (2005)
- 16th (2006)
- 17th (2007)
- 18th (2008)
- 19th (2009)
- 20th (2010)
- 21st (2011)
- 22nd (2012)
- 23rd (2013)
- 24th (2014)
- 25th (2015)
- 26th (2016)
- 27th (2017)
- 28th (2018)
- 29th (2019)
- 30th (2020)
- 31st (2021)
- 32nd (2022)
- 33rd (2023)
