= Jean-Pierre Limosin =

French film director

- Born: 1949 (age 76–77); France
- Occupations: Film director Screenwriter
- Years active: 1983–present

Jean-Pierre Limosin (French: [li.mɔ.zɛ̃]; born 1949) is a French film director and screenwriter. He has directed seven films since 1983. His film Tokyo Eyes was screened in the Un Certain Regard section at the 1998 Cannes Film Festival.

== Filmography ==
- Faux fuyants (1983)
- Gardien de la nuit (1986)
- L'autre nuit (1988)
- Tokyo Eyes (1998)
- Novo (2002)
- Carmen (2005)
- Young Yakuza (2007)
