= Keisuke Yoshida (director) =

Japanese film director and screenwriter

- Born: 1975 (age 50–51); Japan
- Occupations: Film director, screenwriter

Keisuke Yoshida (𠮷田 恵輔, Yoshida Keisuke) is a Japanese film director and screenwriter. His film Raw Summer won the Fantastic Off-Theatre Competition Grand Prize at the 2006 Yubari International Fantastic Film Festival.

== Filmography ==
- Raw Summer (2005)
- The Contents of the Desk (2006)
- Cafe Isobe (2008)
- Triangle (2010)
- The Workhorse & the Bigmouth (2013)
- Mugiko-san to (2013)
- Silver Spoon (2014)
- Himeanole (2016)
- Thicker Than Water (2018)
- Come On Irene (2018)
- Intolerance (2021)
- Blue (2021)
- God Seeks in Return (2022)
- Missing (2024)
- Mentor (2026)
- Unchained (2026)
