= Young Thugs: Innocent Blood =

1997 film by Takashi Miike

- DVD cover
- Directed by: Takashi Miike
- Screenplay by: Masa Nakamura
- Based on: Kishiwada shōnen gurentai: Chikemuri junjō-hen by Riichi Nakaba
- Produced by: Masao Kimura; Toshiaki Nakazawa
- Cinematography: Hideo Yamamoto
- Edited by: Yasushi Shimamura
- Music by: Tomio Terada
- Release date: June 21, 1997 (Japan)
- Running time: 108 minutes
- Country: Japan
- Language: Japanese

Young Thugs: Innocent Blood (Japanese: 岸和田少年愚連隊 血煙り純情篇, Hepburn: Kishiwada shōnen gurentai: Chikemuri junjō-hen) is a 1997 Japanese film directed by Takashi Miike. It is based on the autobiographical novel Kishiwada shōnen gurentai: Chikemuri junjō-hen written by Riichi Nakaba. It is the sequel to the 1996 film Boys Be Ambitious and is followed by the 1998 prequel film Young Thugs: Nostalgia.

== Plot ==
Riichi, Yūji, Kotetsu, and Ryōko have just graduated from high school in Kishiwada. For one last childhood prank Ryōko lures one of her teachers behind a building with the offer of intercourse before Riichi and Yūji tip over a potted plant onto his head and Ryōko photographs it. Ryōko manages to get a job at a hair salon while Kotetsu manages to get a job as a bartender. Riichi and Yūji are left to work as gang enforcers. When Riichi begins sleeping with Nahomi, his girlfriend Ryōko pours a glass of tomato juice on his head then asks Masae to cut Ryōko's long hair to her shoulders. Ryōko then collects all of her pictures of herself and Riichi together in a garbage bag that she gives to their friend Yūji to burn. Yūji gives the bag of photos to Riichi, who initially does not react but later burns them. Masae visits and yells at Riichi for making Ryōko cry, then begins spending more time with Yūji, eventually becoming his girlfriend.
After Riichi moves in with Nahomi she begs him not to fight back against other gang members, so when he is attacked at an arcade he allows himself to be beaten and stuffed in a batting cage with baseballs fired at him. He returns to Nahomi bloody and bruised and demands praise for not fighting back but she only apologizes and asks him to wait for her while she is at work. Riichi goes to his usual spot but his boss tells him that Nahomi asked him not to put Riichi to work anymore so Riichi breaks up with Nahomi and moves back in with his mother. Riichi visits Yūji but finds him together with Masae, then he sees Kotetsu driving a car borrowed Isami. Upset at his own lack of progress in life, Riichi picks a fight with a group of eight youths, punching and kicking them until they flee.
Riichi, Yūji, and Kotetsu plan a road trip and Riichi attempts to improve his image by not fighting, even when challenged by his old rival Sada. Yūji's mother's surgery is successful and Isami lends Kotetsu a different car, which they use to set out on the road trip to the sea. They are overtaken on the road by a fancy red car, which angers Kotetsu and Riichi. They attempt to race but the brakes and steering fail and they nearly crash into some construction equipment. Yūji soils himself and decides to wash off in the freezing water. When he climbs out he grabs a metal stepladder just before it is struck by lightning, killing him.
Back in Kishiwada, Ryōko and Nahomi console Masae, whose only memento of Yūji is a protractor he found on the ground that he used to find a perfect 67-degree angle. The protractor's original owner, a young schoolboy named Tomoda, spots it in Masae's hands and asks for it back. Nahomi offers to buy him a new one and Masae offers to buy him a hundred more but Tomoda decides to let her keep it because the protractor is happier with Masae. Riichi reveals to Ryōko that he did not burn one of the photos, the photo of Ryōko's teacher with dirt and a flower on his head. After they part ways, Riichi attempts to run back to Ryōko but cannot find her because she has already climbed to the roof of her building. A group of children down below lose hold of a red balloon and Ryōko leans over the railing but is also unable to grab hold of it. Riichi sees that the summer festival season has begun again and charges at his old rival Sada with his fist raised to fight.

== Cast ==
- Takeshi Caesar as Bar owner
- Kōji Chihara as Riichi Nakaba
- Seiji Chihara as Yūji
- Moeko Ezawa
- Marie Kikuchi as Nahomi
- Kazuki Kitamura as Sada
- Takashi Miike as man in red trousers getting beaten up by Riichi
- Riichi Nakaba as Isami
- Hiroko Nakajima as Masae
- Sarina Suzuki as Ryōko
- Kyōsuke Yabe as Kotetsu

== Other credits ==
- Production Design: Akira Ishige
- Assistant Director: Bunmei Katō

== Reception ==
John Charles of Hong Kong Digital called the film "a pleasing character study, filled with persuasive performances and marvelously quirky digressions".

Reviewer Del Harvey of Film Monthly called it "an excellent, must-see film."

In a review for Asian Movie Pulse, reviewer Rouven Linnarz wrote, "Supported by a great cast and solid cinematography, this film offers a different look at Takashi Miike, a worthwhile diversion from the more extreme cinema he has become famous for in the course of his career."

In his book Agitator: The Cinema of Takashi Miike, author Tom Mes notes that the film "remains a unique entry in Takashi Miike's body of work. It’s the only time he ever agreed to make a sequel to another director’s film."

== Prequel ==
Young Thugs: Innocent Blood was followed by a prequel released in 1998 titled Young Thugs: Nostalgia.
