= Kazuyuki Izutsu =

Japanese film director (born 1952)

- Born: 13 December 1952 (age 73); Nara Prefecture, Japan
- Occupation: Film director

Kazuyuki Izutsu (井筒 和幸, Izutsu Kazuyuki; born 13 December 1952) is a Japanese film director, screenwriter and film critic.

== Career ==
Born in Nara Prefecture, Izutsu started making 8mm films in high school, and directed his first 35mm film, a pink film, in 1975. He earned a citation from the Directors Guild of Japan New Directors Award in 1981 for Gaki Teikoku, and his Boys Be Ambitious won the best picture award at the 1996 Blue Ribbon Awards. He received two Japanese Academy Award nominations in 2006 for writing and directing Pacchigi! and won the award for best director at the 27th Yokohama Film Festival for that film. Izutsu frequently appears on television in Japan and is known for his critical commentary. He has also directed many television commercials.

== Filmography ==
- Iku Iku Maito Gai: Seishun no Monmon (1975)
- Nikuiro no Umi (1978)
- Bōkōma Shinju-zeme (1979)
- Shikijō Mesu-gari (1981)
- Gaki Teikoku: Akutare Sensō (1981)
- Gaki Teikoku (1981)
- Akai Fukushū: Bōkan (1982)
- Miyuki (1983)
- Hare Tokidoki Satsujin (1984)
- Nidaime wa Christian (1985)
- Inuji ni Seshi Mono (1986)
- Abunai Hanashi Mugen Monogatari (1989)
- Universal Laws (1990)
- Boys Be Ambitious (1996)
- Amateur Singing Contest (1999)
- Big Show! Hawaii ni Utaeba (1999)
- Get Up! (2003)
- Pacchigi! (2005)
- Pacchigi! Love & Peace (2007)
- The Hero Show (2010)
- Fly with the Gold (2012)
- Wiseguy (2020)
- Border (2027)
