= The Gate of Youth: Part 2 =

- Theatrical poster
- Directed by: Koreyoshi Kurahara
- Written by: Kôji Takada
- Based on: The Gate of Youth by Hiroyuki Itsuki
- Produced by: Tan Taikawa; Gorô Kusakabe; Kyô Namura
- Starring: Kōichi Satō; Kaori Momoi; Kaoru Sugita; Kazama Morio; Mitsuru Hirata
- Cinematography: Hanjiro Nakazawa
- Edited by: Akira Suzuki
- Music by: Shunsuke Kikuchi
- Production company: Toei
- Distributed by: Toei
- Release date: January 23, 1982 (Japan)
- Running time: 137 minutes
- Country: Japan
- Language: Japanese

The Gate of Youth: Part 2 (Japanese: 青春の門 自立篇, Hepburn: Seishun no mon: Jiritsu hen), also known as The Gate of Youth: Independence Chapter, is a 1982 Japanese drama film directed by Koreyoshi Kurahara and written by Kôji Takada. It is a direct sequel to the 1981 film The Gate of Youth, which was co-directed by Kurahara and Kinji Fukasaku. Both films are an adaptation of the literary series of the same name by Hiroyuki Itsuki. The Gate of Youth: Part 2 continues the story of Shinsuke Ibuki as he navigates life at Waseda University in the mid-1950s. Compared to the first film, which largely took place in a rural setting, Part 2 is a gritty urban drama.

The film once again stars Kōichi Satō in the role of Shinsuke, as well as Kaori Momoi, Kaoru Sugita, Kazama Morio and Mitsuru Hirata. Toei theatrically released The Gate of Youth: Part 2 on January 23, 1982, in Japan.

== Plot ==
Leaving his hometown of Chikuo behind, Shinsuke Ibuki (Kōichi Satō) moves by himself to Tokyo and enrolls in Waseda University. As the Sunagawa Struggle gains momentum in the background and the social climate becomes chaotic, Shinsuke spends his days looking for lodgings.

One day, Shinsuke meets a drama club student named Tatsuya Ogata (Kazama Morio). They quickly hit it off, and Ogata takes Shinsuke out drinking. After getting completely drunk, Shinsuke is brought to Ogata’s boarding house, where Ogata gives him a room. However, the next morning, Ogata is nowhere to be seen. It is revealed that Ogata had already been kicked out of the house, having saved up six months' worth of rent to spend on other things.

Things go from bad to worse as Shinsuke’s student ID is stolen, preventing him from working part-time to pay his bills. By chance, he spots Ogata selling rabbits at a street vendor and confronts him. However, Ogata shows no remorse. He gives the job to Shinsuke before running off. Shinsuke takes the position as he needs the money. The next day, he sells a rabbit to a mysterious, attractive woman, but he is unable to get her name before she disappears.

A few days later, Ogata invites Shinsuke to a brothel. Shinsuke begrudgingly accepts the invitation. Ogata pays their way in using money he earned from selling his blood. The beautiful prostitute Shinsuke meets there, Kaoru (Kaori Momoi), is the woman who bought the rabbit from him a few days earlier. They make love.

Eventually, Shinsuke joins Waseda’s boxing club and begins serious training under the guidance of instructor Ishii (Tsunehiko Watase). Around the same time, Shinsuke's childhood friend Orie (Kaoru Sugita) arrives in Tokyo, having followed Shinsuke, and takes up residence in a ramen shop. However, when she is falsely accused of stealing money from the shop, she becomes enraged and storms out.

Orie, now without shelter, is at a loss. Her acquaintance Takuji (Shōhei Hino) shows up and offers sweet words. However, his intentions do not turn out to be sincere. He attempts to rape Orie, but she is saved by Kaoru. Kaoru helps Orie obtain a job as a maid at the brothel.

Informed of Orie’s arrival, Shinsuke goes to the brothel, intending to visit her for the first time in a long while. When he arrives, Orie is out. He decides to wait for her and rests in Kaoru's room. Kaoru suddenly suffers from stomach cramps. Shinsuke rubs Kaoru’s back to comfort her, and Kaoru hugs him. Unfortunately, Orie, who had just returned home, witnesses the incident and disappears without telling anyone where she is going. Both Shinsuke and Kaoru search for her desperately, but their efforts are in vain.

Orie wanders the streets. One day, she comes across Takuji again. Takuji offers her a job at a seedy prostitution bar. With no other choice, she sells herself to the bar, located on the west side of Ikebukuro.

Kaoru and Shinsuke soon discover Orie’s whereabouts. Kaoru gives Shinsuke ¥50,000 to buy Orie’s freedom. He goes to rescue Orie, but the proprietress and bartender don't take him seriously. He is then beaten to a pulp by Eiji (Yorozuya Kinnosuke), a yakuza assassin present at the scene. However, Shinsuke is able to explain the situation, and thanks to Eiji's efforts, Orie is able to leave.

Later, Ishii and his girlfriend Riko (Yutaka Nakajima) have a conversation about Riko’s pregnancy. They argue about whether or not to have the child. Riko does not want a baby, but Ishii demands she bear his child. Afterwards, Riko asks Shinsuke to accompany her to the hospital, to which he agrees. At the hospital, Riko has an abortion. Shinsuke informs Ishii of this and harshly criticizes his attitude. From then on, Ishii is a completely different person. He becomes addicted to alcohol and begins frequenting the bars in Shinjuku Ni-chōme, where he meets Kaoru. She takes a liking to Ishii, despite his addiction.

Months pass. Shinsuke is informed that Eiji the assassin was killed. Meanwhile, Kaoru has also become addicted to alcohol. She and Ishii attempt suicide by overdosing on pills. However, both of them survive. Shinsuke decides to leave them behind, having had enough of life on the gritty streets of Tokyo.

Shinsuke joins the Waseda drama club. During summer break, together with Ogata and the other drama club members, he sets off for Hokkaido in pursuit of a new life.

== Cast ==
- Kōichi Satō as Shinsuke Ibuki
- Kaori Momoi as Kaoru
- Kaoru Sugita as Orie
- Kazama Morio as Tatsuya Ogata
- Mitsuru Hirata as Masakazu Kawachi
- Shōhei Hino as Takuji
- Akiko Hyûga as G.I.'s only
- Mariko Kaga as Oei
- Yūko Katagiri as Etsuko
- Nenji Kobayashi as Ryoji Kimoto
- Mako Midori as Teruyo
- Yutaka Nakajima as Riko Hayase
- Yorozuya Kinnosuke as Eiji Niki
- Mineko Nishikawa as Hatsumi
- Maki Tachibana as Shizuko
- Jirō Yabuki as Ryuji Hamazaki
- Ma'ako Kido
- Takashi Ebata
- Ai Nogawa
- Umezu Sakae
- Shinji Kanai
- Tsunehiko Watase as Instructor Tadao Ishii

== Production ==
Following the success of the first film, Toei announced that the series would receive annual installments. As he was given more production time on the sequel, Kurahara chose to be sole director for Part 2. The producers chose Kôji Takada as the film's screenwriter. He would work with Kurahara again on Haru no Kane.

With the exception of Kōichi Satō as Shinsuke and Kaoru Sugita as Orie, the cast almost entirely features new characters and actors. However, Tsunehiko Watase, who played Kanayama in the first film, appears again in Part 2 as a Waseda professor and boxing instructor. Nenji Kobayashi also returned in a new role. Kaori Momoi was selected for the role of Kaoru, who was played by Ayumi Ishida in the Toho version. Itsuki recommended her due to his belief that "no one else could fit the role." Keiko Matsuzaka, whose character Tae had died in the previous film, was asked to appear again in a different role, but this proposal was rejected by Shochiku.

After shooting this film, director Kurahara committed to full-time production on Antarctica, a project he had been planning for four years. According to cast and crew, Kurahara could not stop talking about Antarctica during filming for The Gate of Youth: Part 2.

== Release ==
The Gate of Youth: Part 2 was released on January 23, 1982 by Toei. It did not fare as well as the first film at the box office. As a result, plans for a prospective third installment were scrapped.

== Awards ==
The film was nominated in three categories at the 6th Japan Academy Film Prizes, including Best Actress for Kaori Momoi (also nominated for Suspicion), Best Screenplay for Kôji Takada (also nominated for Onimasa), and Best Music Score for Shunsuke Kikuchi (also nominated for To Trap a Kidnapper).
