= Manon (1981 film) =

- Film poster
- Directed by: Yōichi Higashi
- Screenplay by: Yōichi Higashi; Akiko Tanaka
- Based on: Manon Lescaut by Abbé Prévost
- Produced by: Katsuhiro Maeda
- Starring: Setsuko Karasuma; Masahiko Tsugawa; Kōichi Satō; Takeshi Kitano; Hiroko Isayama
- Cinematography: Koichi Kawakami
- Edited by: Keiko Ichihara
- Music by: Ichiro Araki
- Production company: Gentosha
- Distributed by: Toho-Towa
- Release date: September 26, 1981 (Japan)
- Running time: 108 minutes
- Country: Japan
- Language: Japanese

Manon (Japanese: マノン) is a 1981 Japanese drama film directed by Yōichi Higashi and co-written by Higashi with Akiko Tanaka. The film is based on the 18th century French novel Manon Lescaut by Abbé Prévost. It tells the story of Mitsuko, a trainee at a theater company who is sexually involved with two different men: one a wealthy loan shark, the other a penniless college student. The film stars Setsuko Karasuma in the lead role, in addition to Masahiko Tsugawa, Kōichi Satō, Takeshi Kitano (in one of his earliest acting roles) and Hiroko Isayama. Ichiro Araki composed the film's score, in addition to playing the role of Yoshino. Its theme song is "Don't Wait for the Big Bird" (Big Birdを待たないで) by the Japanese rock band Tensaw. Manon was theatrically released by Toho-Towa on September 26, 1981, in Japan.

== Plot ==
Mitsuko, a trainee at a theater troupe, lives with a teacher named Yoshino. She is a sexually active young woman who works part-time to support herself. At her job, she meets Takizawa, a wealthy loan shark, and spends the night with him. They strike up a relationship, and Mitsuko starts living with him after a fight with Yoshino. Meanwhile, Mitsuko's brother, a gangster named Shinobu, learns of her relationship with Takizawa and begins extorting him.

Takizawa heads to Matsumoto, Nagano for the funeral of a friend who died suddenly. Mitsuko accompanies him. Left alone during the funeral, Mitsuko heads out into the city late at night. She meets Itaru, a college student working part-time at a construction site. They spend the night together on the rooftop of a department store.

The next day, Takizawa and Mitsuko return to Tokyo by train. Unable to ignore his attraction to Mitsuko, Itaru follows them on the same train. However, he becomes homeless in Tokyo and wanders aimlessly through the city. Eventually, Itaru steals money from a supermarket cash register to survive. He is caught and runs off to Takizawa's place of business. Takizawa takes him in, feeling a strange affinity for the reckless young Itaru. Slowly but surely, Mitsuko's makeshift ménage à trois implodes, ruining the lives of all three characters.

== Cast ==
- Setsuko Karasuma as Mitsuko
- Masahiko Tsugawa as Takizawa
- Kōichi Satō as Itaru
- Takeshi Kitano as Shinobu
- Hiroko Isayama as Eiko
- Ichiro Araki as Yoshino
- Kiyohiko Ichihara as Takumi
- Genji Kawai
- Kazumasa Negishi
- Taro Jin
- Akira Hanagami
- Beat Kiyoshi as Financial Company Employee
- Sakura Kamo
- Chōichirō Kawarasaki as Kuwashiro

== Background ==
Lead actress Karasuma played the title character in Higashi's previous film Shiki Natsuko (1980). Kōichi Satō was 21 years old at the time of filming, and had made his film debut earlier the same year in The Gate of Youth.

== Release ==
Manon was theatrically released by Toho-Towa on September 26, 1981, in Japan. The film was later released to DVD on October 26, 2013.

== Awards and nominations ==
24th Blue Ribbon Awards

- Won: Best Supporting Actor (Masahiko Tsugawa)
- Won: Best Newcomer (Kōichi Satō, also won for The Gate of Youth)
