= 十三 =

十三, meaning "thirteen", may refer to:

- Jūsō, residential district in Yodogawa-ku, Osaka, Japan
- Jūzō, Japanese given name
- Unno Jūza (海野 十三; 1897-1949), Japanese novelist

== See also ==
- The dictionary definition of 十 at Wiktionary
- The dictionary definition of 三 at Wiktionary
- Thirteen (disambiguation)
