= Jūzō =

- Gender: Male

Origin
- Origin: Japanese
- Meaning: Different meanings depending on the kanji used

Jūzō, Juzo or Juuzou (written: 十三 or 重蔵) is a masculine Japanese given name. Notable people with the name include:

- Jūzō Itami (伊丹 十三; 1933–1997), Japanese actor and film director
- Juzo Sanada (真田 重蔵; 1923–1994), Japanese baseball player
- Jūzō Yamasaki (山崎 十三; born 1941), Japanese manga artist

== Fictional characters ==
- Jūzō Ibuki (伊吹 重蔵), a character in the 1969 novel The Gate of Youth by Hiroyuki Itsuki and its film and television adaptations
- Jūzō Fuwa (腑破 十臓), a character in the television series Samurai Sentai Shinkenger
- Jūzō Honenuki (鉈 十三), a character in the manga series Boku no Hero Academia
- Jūzō Okita (沖田 十三), a character in the anime series Space Battleship Yamato
- Jūzō Sakakura (逆蔵 十三), a character in the anime series Danganronpa 3: The End of Hope's Peak High School
- Jūzō Suzuya (鈴屋 什造), a character in the manga series Tokyo Ghoul

== See also ==
- Jūzaburō Namba (難波 重三郎), a character in the television series Kamen Rider Build
- Tsutaya Jūzaburō (蔦屋 重三郎; 1750–1797), Japanese publisher
