= Setsuko Karasuma =

Japanese model, actress and idol (born 1955)

Setsuko Karasuma (烏丸 せつこ, Karasuma Setsuko) is an actress and model born on 3 February 1955 in Ōtsu, Shiga Prefecture, Japan. She attended Chukyo University, but left before finishing. She is employed by the From First Production talent agency. Karasuma made her debut as a Clarion Girl in 1980, moving quickly into the gravure idol scene. Her debut as a film actress came as she got the lead role in the 1980 adaptation of the Hiroyuki Itsuki novel Four Seasons・Natsuko (四季・奈津子, Shiki・Natsuko).

== Filmography ==
=== Film ===
- Kaichōon (1980), Sachiko Yoshii
- Four Seasons・Natsuko (1980)
- Manon (1981)
- Station (1981)
- Sukkari...sono Ki de (1981)
- Make Up (1987)
- Mishima: A Life in Four Chapters (1985)
- Twilight of the Cockroaches (1987), Momoko
- Harōbari Nezumi (1991)
- Hokui 15° no Duo (1991)
- Kiseki no Yama: Sayōnara Meiken Heiji (1992), Keiko Kanō,
- Minami no Shima ni Yuki ga Furu (1995), Tomomi Kanoya
- Young Thugs: Nostalgia (1998)
- Haha no Iru Basho・Taifū Ikka (2004)
- Parōre (2004)
- Hisao (2004)
- Ta ga Tame ni (2005)
- Sō Kamoshirenai (2006)
- Matsugane Ransha Jiken (2007)
- The Truth about Nanjing (2007)
- The Crimes That Bind (2018)
- You've Got a Friend (2022)
- Living in Two Worlds (2024), Hiroko Suzuki
- August Grove (2026)

=== Television ===
- Scarlet (2020)
