= Agnes Lum =

American singer (born 1956)

- Born: Agnes Nalani Lum; May 21, 1956 (age 70); Honolulu, Territory of Hawaii (now State of Hawaii, United States)
- Other name: Lum-chan
- Years active: 1975–1983
- Modeling information
- Height: 1.6 m (5 ft 3 in)
- Hair color: Black-brown
- Eye color: Brown

Agnes Nalani Lum (/lʌm/; born May 21, 1956), or Lum-chan, is an American former model, singer, and actress who gained popularity in Japan in the late 1970s and early 1980s. She began modeling while still in high school. She won the Miss Hawaii USA contest in 1974, but was disqualified due to barely missing the age cutoff.

After modeling for Shiseido in 1974, she became a very popular model in Japan, appearing in advertisements for Coca-Cola, Lion, Toyota, Asahi Kasei, and Kodak. She was also featured on the covers and in interior photo collections in magazines such as Weekly Playboy, Heibon Punch, Myojo, Goro, and Yomiuri Weekly. The fictional character Lum, from the Urusei Yatsura manga series by Rumiko Takahashi, was modeled after her.

During her short singing career, Lum released two singles and two albums from 1977 to 1978. The first single, "Downtown After the Rain" (雨あがりのダウンタウン, Ame-agari no Dauntaun), charted at #79 on the Oricon singles chart. A compilation album was released in 2002. She appeared as herself in a short promotional film released in 1976, as well as taking a supporting role in the 1981 film, The Young General Who Returned (帰ってきた若大将, Kaettekita Wakadaishō). She has made numerous appearances on television variety shows and "what is this celebrity doing now?" shows.

Lum married a childhood friend in 1986, and they had twins in 1987.

== Biography and career ==
Agnes Nalani Lum was born on May 21, 1956 in Honolulu, Territory of Hawaii to a Chinese father and a multiracial mother of Korean, Native American, and Native Hawaiian ancestry. She attended Kalāheo Intermediate School where she was a cheerleader in 9th grade. While attending Kailua High School, she continued with her cheerleading and began working as a model, becoming well known in Hawaii. She was named Miss Hawaii USA in 1974, but was disqualified because she was three days too young to compete in the contest.

=== Career ===
Her first job modeling for a Japanese company was for Shiseido in 1974. Following that job, she became a sensation and was requested for additional modeling work in Japan, appearing in advertisements for Coca-Cola, Lion, Toyota, Asahi Kasei, and Kodak. She was often referred to as "Lum-chan" in order to avoid confusion with Agnes Chan, a popular idol at the time in Japan. All of the photography work for these jobs were done outside of Japan, including in Hawaii and Guam. In March 1975, she made her first trip to Japan, and she remembers it being very cold. Her first modeling jobs in Japan were for Glico Dairy Products and an appearance in the magazine Non-no. She was the cover model ten times or more for Weekly Playboy, Heibon Punch, Myojo (ja), Goro (ja), and Yomiuri Weekly (ja), and she was the inspiration for the name of the fictional character Lum from Urusei Yatsura.

Lum became an overnight success in Japan after becoming the first Clarion Girl in June 1975, hired to promote Clarion products in a television and print advertising campaign. The first Clarion poster to feature Lum had 10,000 copies printed, but most of them were shortly stolen from storefronts. 100,000 additional copies of the poster were printed, but most of them also disappeared quickly. Lion offered 50 posters featuring Lum as promotional gifts for those who purchased their Emeron Minky Treatment (a hair product), and they were flooded with over 140,000 requests for the poster. Her popularity was considered unusual for a photographic model as she was not an actor or a singer at the time, and she showed little interest in those.

She was scheduled for a trip to Japan in July 1976, but canceled it amid rumors that she disliked the busy photography and media appearance schedule. A short promotional video, Sun Lover: Agnes Lum (太陽の恋人 アグネス・ラム, Taiyō no Koibito: Agunesu Ramu), was released in September. She traveled to Japan a second time in November that year, where she was enthusiastically greeted by fans at the airport. At a signing event at a bookstore, 3000 people showed up for an event with space for only 100, and the event was ended after only 20 minutes. At her appearance at the first Hiroshima Flower Festival in May 1977, she had to be taken away on a fire truck due to the number of fans overwhelming the venue.

In July 1977, she released her first single, "Downtown After the Rain" (雨あがりのダウンタウン, Ame-agari no Dauntaun), which sold 8,000 copies and reached #79 on the Oricon singles chart. Her first full album, I Am Agnes Lum, was also released in July. That same year, she made her debut appearance on NHK's Kōhaku Uta Gassen variety show and on Star Sen-ichiya (スター千一夜, Sutā Sen'ichiya), a long-running celebrity variety show. Her second single, I Won't Say Goodbye (さよならは言わない, Sayonara wa Iwanai), was released in March 1978 along with her second and final non-collection album, With Love. She appeared as "Flora" in the Toho film The Young General Who Returned (帰ってきた若大将, Kaettekita Wakadaishō) in February 1981.

=== Retirement from modeling ===
Lum married a childhood friend in 1986, and had twin sons born in 1987, and retired from full-time modeling work. She appeared, along with her twin sons, in a 1996 television commercial for the Daihatsu Pyzar. She has periodically made appearances in commercials and on various television shows since retiring. Photos of Lum have been featured in numerous pachinko machines, posters, calendars, advertisements, and other goods. Her twins are both married and are neighbors to Lum and her husband.

Photobooks and other works documenting her career were only released years after she retired. South of Eden: My Hawaiian Way of Life (エデンの南-My Hawaiian Way of Life, Eden no Minami – Mai Hawaian Uei obu Raifu), with photography by Tsuyoshi Inaji, was released in July 1998. It contains photos of and essays about Lum and her family in Hawaii. Agnes Lum, with photography by Kenji Nagatomo, was released in April 2000. When Agnes Lum Was Here (アグネス・ラムのいた時代, Agunesu Ramu no Ita Jidai) by Kenji Nagatomo and Miho Osada was released in February 2007. September 2012 saw the release of The Gravure Idol: Fairy of Paradise: Agnes Lum Photobook (The グラビアアイドル 楽園の妖精 アグネス・ラム写真集, Za Gurabia Aidoru: Rakuen no Yōsei: Agunesu Ramu Shashinshū) by Kenji Nagatomo. Ten years later, Agnes Lum Photobook: 1974 Memories (アグネス・ラム写真集 「1974Memories」, Agunesu Ramu Shashinshū: 1974 Memories), by Hogara Iketani, was released in January 2017. An ebook, Agnes Lum: Lover of Sandy Beaches (アグネス・ラム 砂浜の恋人, Agunesu Ramu: Sunahama no Koibito) by Kenji Nagatomo and Hogara Iketani, was released in July 2019.

== Books ==
Listed chronologically.

- South of Eden: My Hawaiian Way of Life (エデンの南-My Hawaiian Way of Life, Eden no Minami – Mai Hawaian Uei obu Raifu) by Tsuyoshi Inaji (July 1998, Saibunkan, ISBN 4-916115-12-0)
- Agnes Lum by Kenji Nagatomo (April 2000, KK Bestsellers, ISBN 4-584-17079-7)
- Hibiscus (2001, Digibook, CD-ROM book)
- When Agnes Lum Was Here (アグネス・ラムのいた時代, Agunesu Ramu no Ita Jidai) by Kenji Nagatomo and Miho Osada (February 2007, Chuokoron Shinsha, ISBN 978-4-12-150238-4)
- Dankai Punch #4 (団塊パンチ４号, Dankai Panchi Yon-gō) (February 2007, Asuka Shinsha, ISBN 978-4-87031-784-0)
- The Gravure Idol: Fairy of Paradise: Agnes Lum Photobook (The グラビアアイドル 楽園の妖精 アグネス・ラム写真集, Za Gurabia Aidoru: Rakuen no Yōsei: Agunesu Ramu Shashinshū) by Kenji Nagatomo (September 2012, Magazine House, ISBN 978-4-83872468-0
- Agnes Lum Photobook: 1974 Memories (アグネス・ラム写真集 「1974Memories」, Agunesu Ramu Shashinshū: 1974 Memories) by Hogara Iketani (January 2017, Futabasha, ISBN 978-4-57531214-0)
- Agnes Lum: Lover of Sandy Beaches (アグネス・ラム 砂浜の恋人, Agunesu Ramu: Sunahama no Koibito) by Kenji Nagatomo and Hogara Iketani (July 2019, Shogakukan, ebook only)

== Discography ==
=== Singles ===
- "Downtown After the Rain" (雨あがりのダウンタウン, Ame-agari no Dauntaun) / "I'm Agnes" (July 1977, Warner-Pioneer, L-100W)
  Keisuke Yamagawa (lyrics), Yūzō Kayama (composition)
- I Won't Say Goodbye (さよならは言わない, Sayonara wa Iwanai) / "Goodbye Dreamer" (グッバイ・ドリーマー, Gubbai Dorīmā) (March 1978, Warner-Pioneer, L-203W)
  Mayo Shōno (lyrics), Masami Koizumi (composition)

=== Albums ===
- I Am Agnes Lum (July 1977, Warner-Pioneer, L-11001W)
- With Love (March 1978, Warner-Pioneer, L-11003W)
- Best (December 2002, Pony Canyon, PCCA-01832)

== Filmography ==
Main characters in bold.

- Sun Lover: Agnes Lum (太陽の恋人 アグネス・ラム, Taiyō no Koibito: Agunesu Ramu) as **herself** (September 1976, Tōei Tokyo, 25 minutes)
- The Young General Who Returned (帰ってきた若大将, Kaettekita Wakadaishō) as **Flora** (February 1981, Toho, 99 minutes)

== Television ==
Main characters in bold.

- Kaenki (火炎樹) (November 1978, Fuji TV, debut television role)
- Daikūkō (大空港) episode 22: "Setsugen no Daitsuisei: Daitōryō Reijō ni Kiki Semaru!!" (雪原の大追跡 大統領令嬢に危機迫る!!) as Anita (January 1979, Fuji TV)
- Tetsudō Kōankan (鉄道公安官) episode 16: "Agnes' Secret Kamakura Trip" (アグネスの鎌倉秘密旅行, Kamakura Himitsu Ryokō) as **Princess Agnes of the Kingdom of Toronga** (August 1979, TV Asahi)
- Dorifu Daibakushō (ドリフ大爆笑) two episodes (July 1977 and July 1980) as **herself** (variety show, Fuji TV)
- Nichiyō Bikku Supesharu (日曜ビックスペシャル) episode "Big Change! That Celebrity Is Now..." (大転身!あの有名人は今…, Daitenkan! Ano Yūmeijin wa Ima...) as **herself** (March 2000, TV Tokyo)
- Ano Hito wa Ima!? 20-seiki Densetsu Aidoru 108-nin Unmi Daisōsaku (あの人は今!?20世紀伝説アイドル108人運身大捜索) as **herself** (December 2000, Nippon TV)
- Chōgoka!! Ano Hito wa Ima! Kagayaku! Yume no Kōhaku Uta Gassen (超豪華!! あの人は今! 輝く! 夢の紅白歌合戦) as **herself** (February 2003, TBS)
- Ano Hito wa Ima!? Terebi Seitan 50-nen Seiki no Hiroin 50-nin (あの人は今!? テレビ生誕50年世紀のヒロイン50人) as **herself** (October 2003, Nippon TV)
- Ano Hito wa Ima!? 30-kai Kinen Densetsu no Hīro & Hiroin 108-nin (あの人は今!? 30回記念伝説のヒーロー&ヒロイン108人) as **herself** (March 2007, Nippon TV)
