= The Gate of Youth =

The Gate of Youth may refer to:

- The Gate of Youth (青春の門, Seishun no mon), a Japanese novel series by Hiroyuki Itsuki
- Adaptations
  - The Gate of Youth (1975 film)
  - The Gate of Youth (1981 film)
