= The Gate of Youth (1981 film) =

1981 Japanese film

- Theatrical release poster
- Directed by: Kinji Fukasaku; Koreyoshi Kurahara
- Written by: Tatsuo Nogami
- Based on: The Gate of Youth by Hiroyuki Itsuki
- Produced by: Tan Taikawa; Gorō Kusakabe; Kyō Namura
- Starring: Kōichi Satō; Bunta Sugawara; Keiko Matsuzaka; Kaoru Sugita; Tomisaburo Wakayama
- Narrated by: Mizuho Suzuki
- Cinematography: Toru Nakajima; Hanjiro Nakazawa
- Edited by: Akira Suzuki
- Music by: Hako Yamasaki
- Production company: Toei
- Distributed by: Toei
- Release date: January 15, 1981 (Japan)
- Running time: 140 minutes
- Country: Japan
- Language: Japanese
- Budget: ¥750 million
- Box office: ¥820 million

The Gate of Youth (Japanese: 青春の門, Hepburn: Seishun no mon) is a 1981 Japanese drama film co-directed by Kinji Fukasaku and Koreyoshi Kurahara. A Kurahara-directed sequel titled Seishun no mon: Jiritsu hen (青春の門 自立篇, lit. The Gate of Youth: Part 2) was released in 1982.

Both films are based on a story by Hiroyuki Itsuki that was originally serialized in the magazine Shūkan Gendai from 1969–70 before being picked up by Kodansha and published as a series of novels (continuing publication intermittently until 1994, and again in 2017 after a 23-year hiatus). The same story inspired a 1975 film of the same name, which itself received a 1977 sequel (also titled Seishun no mon: Jiritsu hen), as well as three separate television productions in 1976-77 (TBS), 1991 (TV Tokyo), and 2005 (TBS).

The Gate of Youth stars Kōichi Satō (in his feature film debut) as protagonist Shinsuke Ibuki, in addition to Bunta Sugawara, Keiko Matsuzaka, Kaoru Sugita (also her feature film debut) and Tomisaburo Wakayama. Toei theatrically released the film on January 15, 1981, in Japan.

== Plot ==
Shinsuke Ibuki (Kōichi Satō) is the son of a miner who works at Chikuo coalfield near Mt. Kaharu, northwest of Tagawa, Fukuoka. His widowed father Juzo (Bunta Sugawara) is nicknamed "Spider" due to his large tattoo. Juzo is a natural leader looked up to by the other miners. When the miners go on strike, Imperial soldiers are brought in with live rounds and fixed bayonets to force them back to work. Juzo uses his skill with dynamite to create a diversion and prevent the troops from firing on the miners.

In 1938, when his son is three years old, Juzo buys freedom for Tae (Keiko Matsuzaka), a prostitute at the local brothel, and takes her to be his wife. Shinsuke comes to accept Tae as his real mother. However, this angers Ryugoro Hanawa (Tomisaburo Wakayama), boss of the Hanawa yakuza gang and patron/unrequited lover of Tae. The two fight over her, but the fight is broken up. Despite their opposition, Juzo and Hanawa gain a begrudging respect for one another. Juzo makes Hanawa promise that, in the event of Juzo's passing, Hanawa will take care of Shinsuke and Tae. He also leaves a gun for Shinsuke in case of emergency.

While planning a rematch against Hanawa's men, Juzo and his team hear that the mine has flooded. Juzo orders everyone to assist in the rescue efforts. He discovers that 30 Korean miners have been trapped by the flood. His Japanese comrades are willing to let the trapped miners die as they are "only Koreans". But Juzo does not accept this. He blasts part of the tunnel to save them. All 30 Korean miners are saved, but Juzo dies in the blast. In the ensuing chaos, some miners appear to be shot, though the culprits are unknown.

Due to Juzo's death, Shinsuke grows up in poverty. His beautiful stepmother rejects all offers of becoming a mistress or remarrying, as she is faithful to Juzo's memory. As the war drags on, she begins working in the mines with the other women. The miners continue to suffer, with all attempts to gain fair pay dismissed as "Communist". Meanwhile, Hanawa is drafted into the Imperial Japanese Army and stationed in Siberia. He eventually returns, reorganizes his gang and becomes a wealthy man who buys up several establishments in the region.

By 1944, six years after the death of his father, Shinsuke has become an unruly teenager. Tae kicks Shinsuke out of the house when he and his friends gang up on a Korean boy named Kumana. He later visits Kumana alone and challenges him to a duel, which ends in a draw. Kumana's father Kanayama Shuretsu (Tsunehiko Watase), de facto leader of the Korean miners, whose original name was Kim Chu-ryol, breaks up the confrontation. Afterwards, he tells Shinsuke and Tae that Juzo saved his life in the mine collapse six years earlier. He gives them a large portion of meat as a gift. Through this incident, Shinsuke learns to treat the Koreans with humanity. Tae develops feelings for Kanayama, but he is abruptly drafted into the war. Meanwhile, Shinsuke becomes attracted to his friend and classmate Orie (Kaoru Sugita). However, he is too young to understand these feelings and does not initially act on them.

When the war ends, the Korean miners tie up their manager, who confesses that Imperial troops shot at them during the mine collapse years earlier. Kanayama returns from the war and meets with Tae. He proposes marriage. Despite her attraction to him, Tae rejects Kanayama's proposition, though they remain friends. In the interim, Hanawa has become a mentor to Shinsuke. Hanawa lets Shinsuke ride on the back of his Harley-Davidson motorcycle. He also gives Tae some money and invites them to live with him in Iizuka, but Tae refuses. She also rejects an offer to become the mistress of her superior at the mine.

The Koreans, fed up with their treatment, enter the mine office and demand equal pay to the Japanese miners. When the police are called in, a riot ensues. Hanawa, now owner of the mine, brings in additional men to quell the unrest. During the confrontation, Kanayama injures Hanawa, after which he hides out at Tae's house. When the other miners arrive to turn him in to the police, Tae gives Kanayama the gun that Juzo left behind, allowing him to escape. Order is restored, though Kanayama is protected from prosecution by his fellow Korean miners.

Tae begins coughing up blood. It is revealed that she has contracted tuberculosis from her years working in the mine. Hanawa tries to help her, but she is eventually put into a hospital to treat her condition. She remains there for several years. As a result, Shinsuke moves to Iizuka, where he lives with Hanawa and attends school.

Just as he is about to enter senior high school in 1950, Shinsuke is scouted by baseball coach Mr. Hirano. The coach says he shows great promise and could even go to university on an athletic scholarship. A year later, Shinsuke's childhood friend Orie and her mother (Taeko Shinbashi) visit Tae in the hospital. Shinsuke arrives on a motorcycle given to him by Hanawa. However, instead of letting Orie ride with him, he takes his music teacher Ms. Azusa (Hitomi Kageyama), whom he has a crush on, to a record store in Hakata. He later feels conflicted by this decision, as he is also still attracted to Orie.

A few years pass. In 1953, Hanawa once again offers to marry the sickly Tae, as he is still in love with her. Tae rejects his proposal. Ms. Azusa quits and returns to Tokyo. Shinsuke visits Orie, who is now working as a bar hostess and prostitute in Kokura. She tells him that her mother recently died. Shinsuke's motorcycle is stolen, so he and Orie stay together at a hotel. Orie takes Shinsuke's virginity, then encourages him to leave his past behind and go to university in Tokyo.

Back in Chikuo, Hanawa is shot in the knee. As the shooting occurred at night, the assailant is unknown. His gang suspects that the Korean miners are responsible. Shinsuke returns to help out Hanawa. While investigating, Chota (Nenji Kobayashi), one of Hanawa's gang members, shoots at them but is captured. It is revealed that Chota was attempting to frame the Koreans in order to start a gang war. Kanayama confirms that the Koreans were not responsible for the shooting. Hanawa and Shinsuke take Chota back with them for punishment.

That same night, Tae dies. Her death and Chota's act of violence finally convince Shinsuke to go to Tokyo. He writes a goodbye letter to Hanawa, purchases a train ticket and rides away.

== Cast ==
- Bunta Sugawara as Juzo Ibuki, Shinsuke's father
- Keiko Matsuzaka as Tae Ibuki, Shinsuke's stepmother
- Kōichi Satō as Shinsuke Ibuki, teenager
  - Koji Kumagai as Shinsuke, elementary and junior high school age
  - Yoshitaka Kase as Shinsuke, child
  - Hisaji Murakami as Shinsuke, infant
- Kaoru Sugita as Orie Maki, teenager
  - Yuko Kikuchi as Orie, elementary and junior high school age
  - Kayoko Nakajima as Orie, elementary school age
- Taeko Shinbashi as Masae Maki
- Tomisaburo Wakayama as Ryugoro Hanawa
- Kōji Tsuruta as Yabetora
- Tsunehiko Watase as Kanayama Shuretsu / Kim Chu-ryol
- Junichi Ishida as Hirano
- Ryunosuke Kaneda as Hanezawa
- Nenji Kobayashi as Chota
- Aoi Nakajima as Kimiyo Hirai
- Kantarō Suga as Ichimura
- Saburō Tokitō as Haruo
- Eiji Okada as Tôno, Chika's stepfather
- Hitomi Kageyama as Azusa Hatae, Shinsuke's music teacher
- Mizuho Suzuki as Narrator
- Kanai Shinji as Hirai Kamekichi
- Takeshi Ôbayashi as Choi Gil-do
- Sakae Umezu as Yuzo Murata
- Kikuo Kaneuchi as Wu Chang-won
- Shigeru Osohara as Lee Kyu-nan
- Yoshiro Ichikawa as Takao Cho
- Keijirô Shiga as Jeong Ben-il
- Kazuo Katô as Director
- Masako Araki as Miner's wife
- Manabu Morita, Otabe Michimaro as Mine owners
- Mayumi Inoue as Harumi
- Tsuyako Okajima as Inn owner
- Oki Mukuro as Section Chief
- Mayumi Umeda as Woman at wedding
- Moeko Ezawa as Shop owner
- Takashi Hio
- Ma'ako Kido

== Production ==
The Gate of Youth is based on a serialized story by Hiroyuki Itsuki. It was originally adapted by Kirio Urayama for Toho in 1975. Urayama’s version was a box office success and spawned a 1977 sequel. However, there were major creative differences between author Itsuki and director Urayama, which prevented production on the third installment. In May 1979, Itsuki visited Toei president Shigeru Okada and requested that his company take over production of the series. Itsuki's only condition was that Ken Takakura should star as Juzo Ibuki, as he had directly inspired the character.

The project initially struggled to get off the ground, due to the recency of the previous adaptation. Production was eventually scheduled to begin in late 1980, with a release date set for January 15, 1981, as Toei had an open slot to fill in that month. By that time, Takakura had already been booked to star in Yasuo Furuhata's Station. The producers offered Takakura the role anyway, but he flatly refused, saying "I can't take responsibility for a hastily put together major production." He also stated "I don't want to do rushed work." Eventually, it was agreed that Bunta Sugawara could play the role of Juzo, and Toei rushed to put The Gate of Youth into production.

Co-producer Gorô Kusakabe asked Tatsuo Nogami to write the script. Though Nogami had a busy schedule due to his work on Hissatsu, he agreed to Kusakabe's offer and hurriedly wrote the screenplay. Nogami recommended Koreyoshi Kurahara, with whom he had worked on the Hissatsu series, as director. Kurahara accepted, as he had a gap in his schedule due to a previous project falling through. Kurahara also participated in the scriptwriting, though he was uncredited for his work.

Due to the scope of the project and Toei's insistence on hitting the pre-set release date, Kurahara suggested a two-man system for directing, as Kurahara did not believe that he alone could complete the work in time. He suggested Kinji Fukasaku, whose previous film Virus had been a large flop, and whose in-development project The Miracle of Joe Petrel had recently fallen apart, for the co-director slot. Fukasaku accepted. It was determined that Kurahara would direct the dramatic scenes, while Fukasaku would handle the action sequences. Fukasaku and Kurahara had been friends since their undergraduate days at Nihon University, and their collaboration went smoothly.

The central role of Shinsuke Ibuki went to Kōichi Satō in his feature film debut. Many actresses screen-tested for the roles of Orie and Tae. Kaoru Sugita, at the time 16 years of age, would secure the role of Orie, also her feature film debut. However, Itsuki specifically requested Keiko Matsuzaka for the role of Tae.

Matsuzaka was one of the most popular actresses in Japan at that time, and she had an exclusive contract with Shochiku. Kusakabe made three requests to Shochiku, at one point kneeling on the ground to beg. Finally, Toei president Okada went to Shochiku. He and Shochiku president Ryuzo Otani came to an agreement, deciding that Matsuzaka would be loaned to Toei for only one film, which would be The Gate of Youth. This news was announced by Okada at Toei's headquarters on November 17, 1980. When later asked about the role, Matsuzaka said "I saw Sayuri Yoshinaga do it at Toho and thought it was a wonderful role, and if I could play it, I'd be honored, and it's a role that any actress would want to play. If it's made into a movie, I definitely want to be in it...It took a long time for it to be decided, and I waited anxiously for over a month. I was shooting Sekigahara on location at Lake Motosu, and I accidentally left my wireless microphone on when I went into the bathroom... everyone could hear... I was so nervous about whether Gate of Youth would be decided, that I was kind of absent-minded."

Shooting began three days after the announcement of Matsuzaka's casting, on November 20, 1980. Matsuzaka and Fukasaku's first day on set was November 25. Filming wrapped by the end of December. The filming time of only a month was considered unusually fast for a major production.

Asked about working with Fukasaku, Matsuzaka said "He never flattered me and he was a bit difficult to approach, but once we got to know each other, he was very kind and it was very easy to work with him. The shooting schedule was very tight, so I felt like I was caught up in a heated whirlpool and I was completely absorbed in my work." She also said "When I was [acting] sad, I tended to make my face look more exaggerated than most people. This time, director Fukasaku saw through me right away, and it was somehow refreshing. He is a really wonderful person. He understands women so well that I wonder why he has not made any films about women before." Matsuzaka worked with Fukasaku again on Dotonbori River, Shanghai Rhapsody and A Chaos of Flowers.

Post-production was completed on January 6, 1981, a little over a week before the film was set to release.

== Marketing ==
At a meeting with industry reporters at the Ginza Toyu Club on December 15, 1980, Toei president Okada was quoted as saying "The values of movies have changed now. The theme of movies being art or entertainment is only applicable to a certain number of critics. Whether a movie becomes a hit with the general public depends not on how good the film is, but on whether it has the elements to become an event...for [Gate of Youth], Matsuzaka Keiko was borrowed from Shochiku in order to make it an event. Gate of Youth is partnering with Kodansha and will have 200 million yen in advertising costs...in '81 I intend to focus on being an event planner, not a producer."

Despite the size of its marketing budget, the film's promotional period was short, causing concern over its box office potential. However, Kodansha, the publisher of Itsuki's series, actively promoted the film, placing full-page advertisements in The Asahi Shimbun and many local newspapers. Itsuki gave magazine and radio interviews, while Matsuzaka also participated in the three-week nationwide ad campaign.

The Gate of Youth included Matsuzaka's first sex scene, which was utilized by the promotional team. Toei upper management insisted that no nude photos of Matsuzaka be distributed to the media until 1981, when they were released all at once, causing a stir.

== Release ==
Toei theatrically released The Gate of Youth on January 15, 1981 in 173 theaters. It was a hit at the box office. Within 36 days, it had grossed ¥820 million, outperforming the original film.

When Kōichi Satō saw the film in theaters with his own image projected on the screen, it strengthened his resolve to make acting his full-time profession.

== Awards ==
Kōichi Satō won the 5th Japan Academy Film Prize for Newcomer of the Year and the 24th Blue Ribbon Award for Best Newcomer for his work in the film.

For her performance, Keiko Matsuzaka earned the 5th Japan Academy Film Prize for Best Actress, also awarded for her work in Tora-san's Love in Osaka. She also won the 24th Blue Ribbon Award for Best Actress (which, like the Japan Academy Film Prize, was also awarded for her performance in Tora-san's Love in Osaka).

== Sequel ==
A direct sequel, The Gate of Youth: Part 2, directed solely by Kurahara, was released a year later.
