= Twilight of the Cockroaches =

1987 film

- American promotional poster
- Directed by: Hiroaki Yoshida
- Written by: Hiroaki Yoshisa
- Produced by: Mayumi Izumi; Tatsumi Watanabe
- Starring: Kaoru Kobayashi; Setsuko Karasuma
- Cinematography: Iwao Yamaki
- Edited by: Seiji Endô
- Music by: Morgan Fisher
- Production companies: Madhouse; Kitty Films
- Distributed by: Nippon Herald Films
- Release dates: November 21, 1987 (Japan); July 24, 1992 (USA)
- Running time: 105 minutes
- Country: Japan
- Language: Japanese

Twilight of the Cockroaches (ゴキブリたちの黄昏, Gokiburi-tachi no Tasogare) is a 1987 Japanese fantasy drama film written and directed by Hiroaki Yoshida that combines live-action footage with animation. The plot concerns a society of anthropomorphic cockroaches who live peacefully in the apartment of a bachelor named Saito, until a woman moves in and the humans begin to exterminate the cockroaches. The cockroaches are depicted through animation, and the humans are depicted through live-action footage.

Director Yoshida has stated that the film is "about Japan" and that the "concept of a 'hated' species is like the racial and cultural enmity with which Japan is perceived". In his New York Times review, Vincent Canby wrote: "The publicity material for Twilight of the Cockroaches describes the film as an allegory about the fate in store for affluent Japan if it doesn't meet its international responsibilities. The film may read that way in Japan. In this country, it looks somewhat darker and more muddled".

The English dub of the film was produced by Streamline Pictures. During the early-to-mid 1990s, the film was shown frequently on Turner Broadcasting stations such as TBS, TNT, and Cartoon Network, often paired with Vampire Hunter D and Robot Carnival.

The soundtrack was composed by Morgan Fisher.

The film was originally released on VHS and LaserDisc by Lumivision in 1991. It was later released on DVD by Discotek Media on February 26, 2019.

== Plot ==
The film focuses on a large tribe of cockroaches called the Hosino Tribe, who live in an apartment owned by a human called Mr. Saito, who lives by himself and is seen to be very messy, making it ideal for the roaches. Saito knows about the roach infestation, but does not care to do anything about them, and the roaches view Saito as a benefactor. They live in luxury, neglecting their traditional abilities and living without caution. They are led by a roach named Sage/Professor, who advises them on matters and states he negotiates with Saito on any issues. In the past, the Hosino tribe were at war against the humans, called the Hosino War, which ended when the then human occupants, the Hosino clan, left and Saito arrived. The Hosino roaches call this Armistice Day.

Ichiro and Naomi are two cockroaches in the tribe, engaged and planning a wedding. Naomi is having doubts about the relationship, and Ichiro is unable to fly. One evening, a roach from another far off tribe called Hans arrive, injured from a battle. Naomi falls in love with him. After recuperating and informing the Hosino tribe of his war, Hans leaves to go back to his tribe. Naomi follows him in secret, with Ichiro unaware. Naomi arrives at another apartment owned by a woman named Momoko. Naomi begins to kindly ask for her help in finding her friend, but Momoko instead tries to stomp on her. It is revealed that Momoko and Hans' militaristic tribe are at war with each other, with Hans' tribe launching attacks on Momoko to get food and Momoko retaliating by killing the roaches with insecticides.

Naomi and Hans are reunited and three weeks pass with them staying together. One evening, Saito and Momoko notice each other from across the apartment complex and soon start seeing each other, though the Hosino roaches are unaware of her. During one visit, Naomi inadvertently returns to Saito's apartment, having hidden in Momoko's purse after a horrific experience in a roach motel. Ichiro and Naomi are reunited, with Naomi telling Ichiro she has amnesia and does not remember being gone. They proceed with their wedding.

Before Naomi can finish her vows, the wedding is disrupted by Momoko, who attacks and kills many of them. Naomi, Ichiro, and the rest of the roaches escape. During the funeral, Sage tells everyone that he will discuss this unprovoked attack with Saito. The next day, however, he is found dead, pinned to a dart board. Meanwhile, Momoko and Saito start mass exterminating the roaches. The Hosino roaches, having not encountered this in several generations, are taken by surprise and many are killed. Meanwhile, Naomi reveals to her grandfather that she is pregnant, but does not know if the litter is Ichiro's or Hans', with Naomi believing it to be the latter. Her grandfather tells her that it is likely a mix of both. Meanwhile Ichiro learns from two of the elderly roaches that everything he and the other roaches were told about the Hosino was a lie made up by Sage and that Saito only tolerated the roaches because he did not have any motivation to get rid of them after his wife and children left him. They also reveal that the reason Sage lied about the war was because he did not know the truth, having hidden in the cellar during the war, and had never met Saito before his wife left him.

The elderly roaches, who remember a time before peace, teach the rest how to forage and steal dropped food, but the roaches grow hungry. Eventually, Hans's tribe arrives, intending to invade, but after learning that the Hosino tribe no longer has any food, agrees to help them. In addition, both Ichiro and Hans, knowing that the other loves Naomi, agree to settle things like men after the battle is over. They set out to drive out the humans using their superior numbers. In response, Saito and Momoko resolve to kill all the roaches at once, setting off many bug bombs and spraying them all around the apartment. The leader of Hans' tribe tells him to escape, as it is believed Hans is the savior of the tribe. As he flees, however, Hans is killed by a falling book dropped by Momoko.

Naomi and Ichiro are some of the few survivors of the onslaught. Naomi receives a vision of her late grandmother, who tells Naomi that she is immune to the insecticides and that she will pass this to her children. Naomi tells Ichiro to escape and meet her at a nearby shrine (actually a toy abandoned in the apartment yard complex), where they will start a new life away from humans. As they escape, Naomi is seemingly killed with insecticides and Ichiro, though he manages to begin flying, is shot to death with an air rifle.

Naomi is revealed to have survived, her vision of being immune proving true, and escapes. The epilogue shows her with a huge litter of children, all seemingly immune to insecticides. Some of her children look like Ichiro and Hans, meaning that both were fathers to a new generation of roaches.

== Cast ==
=== Voice actors ===
- Atsuko Asano as Naomi
- Ichiro Miyakawa as Ichiro
- Mitsuru Hirata as Yasuo
- Hiroshi Yagyu as Seiji
- Ryoko Takakura as Parsley
- Toshio Furukawa as Fritz
- Keisuke Ootori as Kosuke
- Takashi Kusaka as Alois
- Kōzō Shioya as Takashi
- Tanie Kitabayashi as Torah
- Mitsutoshi Ishigami as Grump
- Masato Tsujimura as Kantaro
- Masato Furuoya as Hans

=== Live-action actors ===
- Kaoru Kobayashi as Saito
- Setsuko Karasuma as Momoko

== See also ==
- Joe's Apartment
