= Clarion Girl =

Campaign girl representing Clarion car audio products

A Clarion Girl is a Japanese campaign girl chosen to represent the Clarion car audio products in television and print advertising campaigns. A new representative is chosen annually, and many careers have been launched or enhanced due to being selected during the annual contest. The Clarion Girl campaigns began in 1975 with the selection of Agnes Lum as the first Clarion Girl. Setsuko Karasuma, Masumi Miyazaki, and Renhō were chosen in following years. As of 2002, Clarion stopped selecting one per year, and began working jointly with Fuji TV, expanding into internet advertising.

== Clarion Girls through the years ==
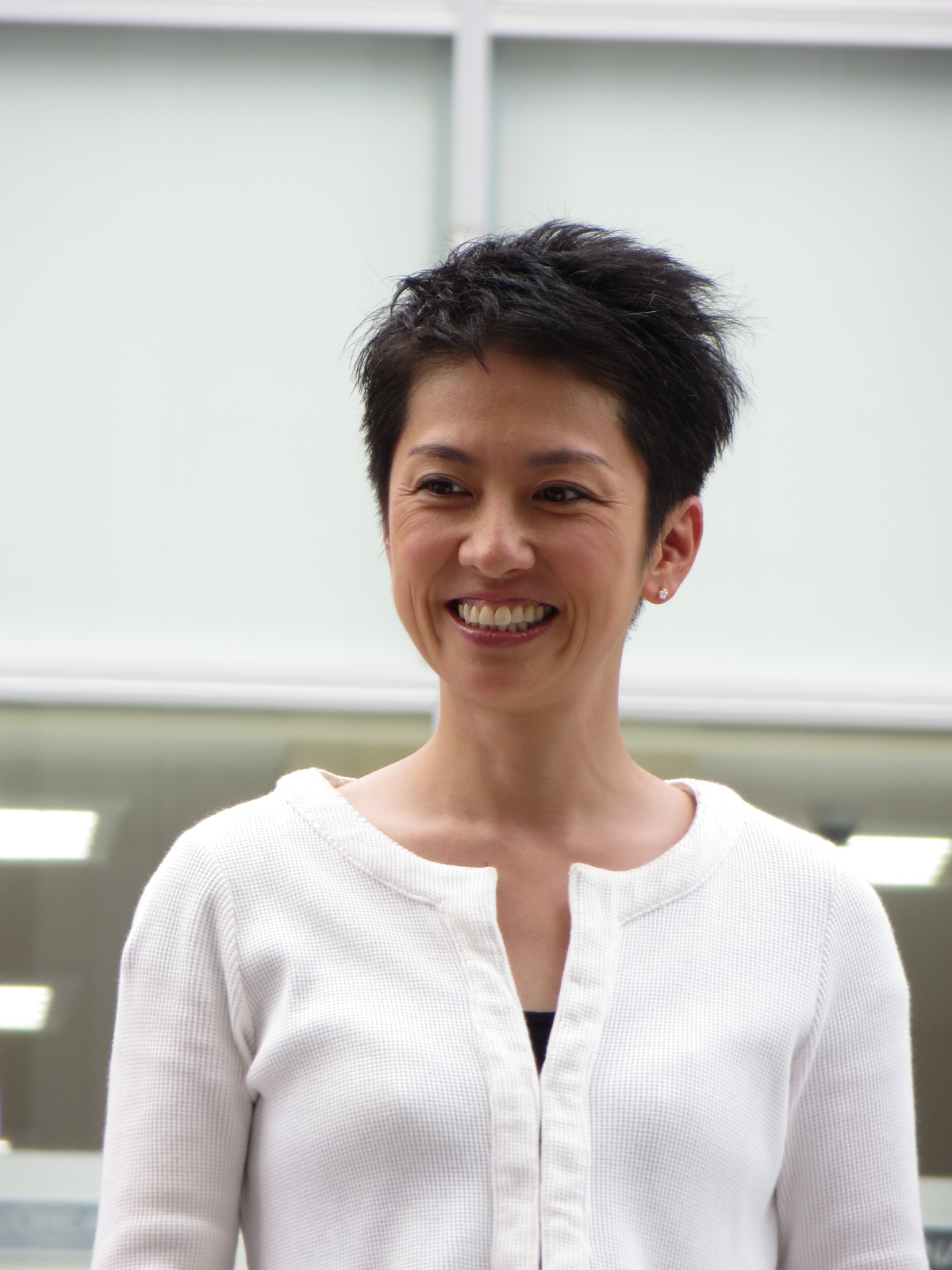
Renhō, 1988 Clarion Girl

1. Agnes Lum (1975)
2. Maile Dale (1976)
3. Sabine Kaneko (1977)
4. Mayumi Horikawa (1978)
5. Naomi Tanaka (1979)
6. Setsuko Karasuma (1980)
7. Yumi Hasegawa (1981)
8. Kaoru Ōtake (1982)
9. Emi Kagawa (1983)
10. Yuri Kurokawa (1984)
11. Masumi Miyazaki (1985)
12. Mika Shiokawa (1986)
13. Miki Kawashima (1987, real name Daria Kawashima)
14. Renhō (1988)
15. Megumi Yūki (1989)
16. Reiko Katō (1990)
17. Shōko Ueda (1991)
18. Shiho Shinjō (1992)
19. Noriko Tachikawa (1993)
20. Misa Takada (1994)
21. Chiaki Hara (1995)
22. Naoko Izumi (1996)
23. Rie Kasai (1997)
24. Sayo Aizawa (1998)
25. Natsu Tōdō (1999)
26. Ai Hazuki (2000)
27. Eliana Silva (2001)
28. Airi Tōriyama (2003)
29. Aoi (2004)
30. Miku Sano (2005)
31. Uri Yun (2006)
