= Toshio Shimao =

Japanese novelist

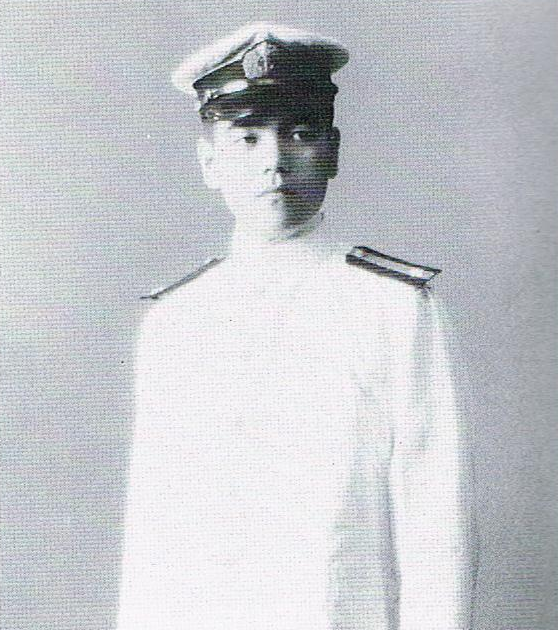
Toshio Shimao in 1944 as a naval officer

Toshio Shimao (島尾 敏雄, Shimao Toshio; April 18, 1917 – November 12, 1986) was a Japanese novelist. He has been called a "writer's writer", which is used as both a compliment and criticism.

== Biography ==
Shimao was born in Yokohama, but his family moved to Kobe when he was eight. His mother died when he was seventeen and soon after he had a period of study in Nagasaki. He later traveled to Taiwan and the Philippines, but returned to education and graduated from Kyushu University in 1943. In 1944 he was appointed commander of the 18th Shin'yō Special Attack Squadron (a unit of explosive suicide motorboats) and was stationed on Kakeroma Island in the Amami Islands.The war ended while he was still waiting for his orders. His wartime experiences inspired his earliest works, including Shima no hate (1946) and Shutsukotō-ki (A Tale of Leaving a Lonely Island, 1949), as well as several later works including Shuppatsu wa tsui ni otozurezu (1962) and Gyoraitei gakusei (Student on the Torpedo Boat, 1985). His wartime period is also where he met his wife, Miho, a Catholic.

A second major theme in his work is that of madness in women, with notable examples in Ware fukaki fuchi yori (1954) and Shi no toge (The Sting of Death, 1960). This theme was related to his wife's mental illness. At some point in 1955, the date is unclear, his wife became mentally ill to the point of requiring hospitalization. He then chose to live with her at the mental hospital, which was seen as a highly unusual action yet praised by Yutaka Haniya's wife as showing "extraordinarily deep love." Although Shimao seems to have felt somewhat to blame for his wife's illness due to his past affairs and what he describes as his own selfishness. In 1955 he took her back to Amami Ōshima, the largest of the Amami Islands; his novella The Sting of Death describes this period using his own name and that of his wife. That work was adapted for the film The Sting of Death in 1990.

A possible third aspect is that in 1956 he converted to Catholicism and his interest is said to be present with the title "The Sting of Death" being a reference to 1 Corinthians 15:55.

== Major prizes ==
- 1950 Postwar Literature Prize for Shutsukotō-ki (A Tale of Leaving a Lonely Island)
- 1960 Minister of Education Award for Art for novella Shi no toge (The Sting of Death)
- 1972 Mainichi Publishing Culture Award for Garasu shoji no shiruetto (Silhouette through Frosted Glass)
- 1977 Yomiuri Literary Prize for collection The Sting of Death
- 1977 Tanizaki Prize for Hi no utsuroi (日の移ろい)
- 1985 Noma Literary Prize for Gyoraitei gakusei (Student on the Torpedo Boat)

== English translations and studies ==
- The Sting of Death and Other Stories, trans. Kathryn Sparling, Michigan Papers in Japanese Studies, University of Michigan Press, 1985. ISBN 0-939512-18-1
- J. Philip Gabriel, Mad Wives and Island Dreams: Shimao Toshio and the Margins of Japanese Literature, University of Hawaii Press, 1999. ISBN 0-8248-2089-4

== Selected works ==
- Amami Kyōdo Kenkyukai ho (奄美鄉土硏究会報), Nase-shi : Amami Kyōdo Kenkyūkai, began in 1959.
- Tōhoku to Amami no mukashibanashi, 1973.
- Yaponeshia josetsu = Japanesia, 1977.
- Shimao Toshio ni yoru Shimao Toshio, Tokyo : Seidōsha, 1981.
- Sugiyuku toki no naka de, Tōkyō : Shinchōsha, 1983.
- Gyoraitei gakusei, (魚雷艇 学生), Tōkyō : Shinchōsha, 1985.
- Yumekuzu, (夢屑), Tōkyō : Kōdansha, 1985.
- Shinʾyō hasshin, (震洋 発進), Tōkyō : Ushio Shuppansha, 1987.
- Kimushi, (記夢志), Tōkyō : Chūsekisha, 1993.
