= Flea-picking Samurai =

2018 Japanese comedy film

- Film poster
- のみとり侍
- Directed by: Yasuo Tsuruhashi
- Screenplay by: Yasuo Tsuruhashi
- Story by: Shigeo Komatsu
- Produced by: Yuko Hata
- Starring: Abe Hiroshi; Shinobu Terajima; Etsushi Toyokawa; Takumi Saitoh; Morio Kazama
- Cinematography: Tomoo Ezaki
- Edited by: Hiroshi Yamada
- Music by: Kei Haneoka
- Production companies: GyaO; Hikari TV; Kobunsha; Robot Communications; The Yomiuri Shimbun Holdings; Jidaigeki Senmon Channel; Tokyu Agency; Wowow; Dentsu; Yomiuri Telecasting Corporation; Kansai Television; TV Osaka; Asahi Broadcasting Corporation; Mainichi Broadcasting System
- Distributed by: Toho
- Release date: May 18, 2018 (Japan)
- Running time: 115 minutes
- Country: Japan
- Language: Japanese

Flea-picking Samurai (Japanese: のみとり侍, Hepburn: Nomitori Samurai) is a 2018 Japanese comedy film directed by Yasuo Tsuruhashi.

== Cast ==
- Abe Hiroshi as Hironoshin Kobayashi
- Shinobu Terajima as Omine
- Etsushi Toyokawa as Seibee
- Takumi Saitoh as Tomonosuke Saeki
- Morio Kazama as Jinbee
