= The Sting of Death =

- DVD cover
- Directed by: Kōhei Oguri
- Written by: Kōhei Oguri; Toshio Shimao (novel)
- Produced by: Seiya Araki
- Starring: Keiko Matsuzaka; Ittoku Kishibe
- Cinematography: Shohei Ando
- Edited by: Nobuo Ogawa
- Music by: Toshio Hosokawa
- Distributed by: Shochiku (Japan)
- Release date: 28 April 1990 (Japan)
- Running time: 115 minutes
- Country: Japan
- Language: Japanese

The Sting of Death (Japanese: 死の棘, Hepburn: Shi no Toge) is a 1990 Japanese drama film directed by Kōhei Oguri and based on the novel by Toshio Shimao. It tells the story of a writer with a wandering eye and his jealous wife. The film was selected as the Japanese entry for the Best Foreign Language Film at the 63rd Academy Awards, but was not accepted as a nominee.

== Cast ==
- Keiko Matsuzaka as Miho (ミホ)
- Ittoku Kishibe as Toshio (トシオ)
- Midori Kiuchi as Kuniko (邦子)
- Takenori Matsumura as Shin'ichi (伸一)
- Yuri Chikamori as Maya (マヤ)
- Akira Yamanouchi as Masagaro a.k.a. Oji (おじ)
- Miyoko Nakamura as Riki a.k.a. Oba (おば)

== Production ==
The film was partly shot on location in Kakeromajima, Amami Islands.

== Awards ==
The Sting of Death won the FIPRESCI Prize and the Grand Prize of the Jury at the 1990 Cannes Film Festival where it was also nominated for the Golden Palm. In that year it also won the Hochi Film Award and the Nikkan Sports Film Award. In 1991 the film won the Award of the Japanese Academy, the Blue Ribbon Award, the Kinema Junpo Award and the Mainichi Film Concours.

== Home media ==
Home video distributor Radiance Films released the film on Blu-ray in early 2024.

== See also ==
- Cinema of Japan
- List of submissions to the 63rd Academy Awards for Best Foreign Language Film
- List of Japanese submissions for the Academy Award for Best Foreign Language Film
