= Tsūkai! OL Dōri =

- Genre: Drama
- Starring: Yasuko Sawaguchi; Kazuki Kosakai; Shingo Tsurumi; Satomi Kobayashi; Kazumi Kawai; Masumi Miyazaki
- Country of origin: Japan
- Original language: Japanese
- No. of episodes: 12

Original release
- Network: TBS
- Release: October 10 – December 26, 1986

Tsūkai! OL Dōri (痛快!OL通り) is a Japanese television drama series that aired on TBS in 1986.

== Cast ==
- Yasuko Sawaguchi
- Kazuki Kosakai
- Shingo Tsurumi
- Satomi Kobayashi
- Kazumi Kawai
- Masumi Miyazaki
