= Akira Yamaguchi =

Japanese artist (born 1969)

Akira Yamaguchi (山口 晃, Yamaguchi Akira; born 1969 in Tokyo, Japan) is a Japanese contemporary artist.

== Biography ==
Born in Tokyo, he grew up in the city of Kiryū, Gunma Prefecture.

He received his B.A. in oil painting (1994) and M.A. in oil painting (1996) from the Tokyo University of the Arts. Yamaguchi designed the cover art for the album V by the nu-jazz music duo United Future Organization and illustrated the book Chronicles of My Life: An American in the Heart of Japan by Donald Keene.

He lives and works in Tokyo. His artwork has been exhibited worldwide. He is represented by Mizuma Art Gallery.

He appeared in the 2003 film Lost in Translation. Yamaguchi illustrated Hiroyuki Itsuki's serialized novel about the life of Shinran, with the illustrations later published in their own standalone collection.

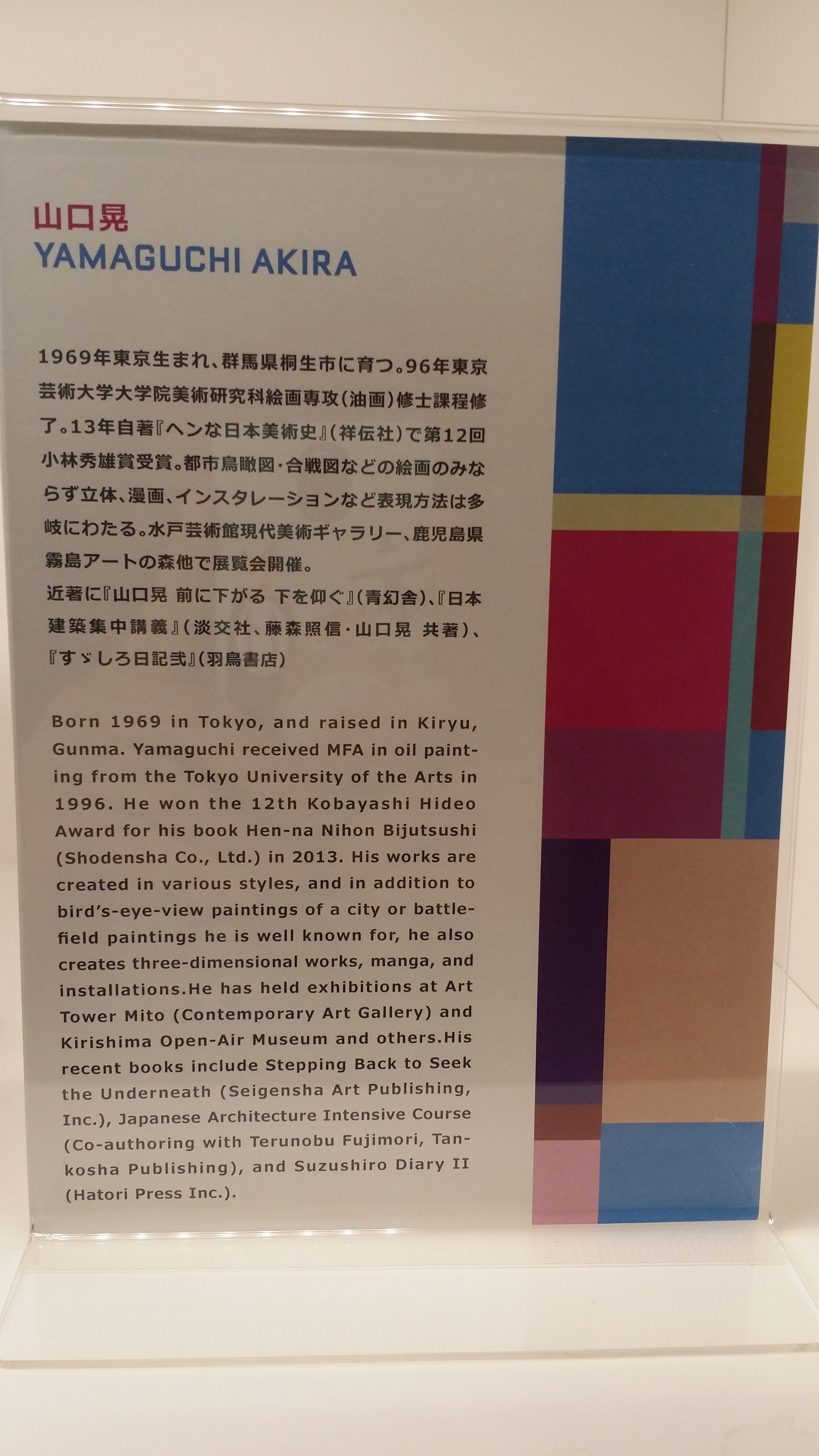
Yamaguchi Akira Exhibition Summary

== Style ==
Yamaguchi's painting style combines contemporary oil painting techniques with the traditional Japanese composition style known as Yamato-e. He has also produced a number of drawings and ukiyo-e.

== See also ==
- List of Japanese artists
