= Mayumi Horikawa =

Mayumi Horikawa (堀川 まゆみ, Horikawa Mayumi) is a Japanese model and singer-songwriter born on 2 May 1958 in Okinawa Prefecture. Horikawa was selected as the fourth Clarion Girl in 1978, and debuted as a singer that same year under producer Masataka Matsutōya.

Horikawa has written and composed songs for popular artists including Miki Imai, Jun'ichi Inagaki, Yukiko Okada, Kyōko Koizumi, Yuki Saito, Noriko Sakai, Miho Nakayama, Yū Hayami, Chiemi Hori, Saori Yagi, and Marina Watanabe.

== Discography ==
=== Albums ===
- The Art of Romance(1993)
- The Elm-Passing Girl (楡（エルム）通りの少女, Erumu Tōri no Shōjo) (1978)
- Maym (1986)
- Olive (1979)

=== Composition ===
- Almost Steady (もうすぐSteady, Mō Sugu Sutedī)
- Chestnut Hair in the Wind (風の中の栗毛, Kaze no Naka no Kurige)
- Coke Bottle Letter (コーク壜の手紙, Kōkubin no Tegami)
- Daddy (ダディー, Dadī)
- Glass Road (ガラスの街, Garasu no Machi)
- Last Phrase (ラスト・フレイズ, Rasuto Fureizu)
- Lemon Sense (レモン感覚, Remon Kankaku)
- Light and Shadow (光と影, Hikari to Kage)
- Song for Jenny (ソング・フォー・ジェニー, Songu fō Jenī)
- The Sun Has Yet to Rise (陽はまた昇る, Hi wa Mata Noboru)
- Tropical Cyclone (熱帯性低気圧, Nettaisei Teikiatsu)
