= Tsunehiko Watase =

Japanese actor (1944–2017)

- 渡瀬 恒彦
- Born: July 28, 1944; Shimane, Japan
- Died: March 14, 2017 (aged 72); Tokyo
- Education: Waseda University
- Occupation: Actor
- Years active: 1969–2017
- Spouse: Reiko Ohara (m. 1973; div. 1978)
- Relatives: Tetsuya Watari (brother)

Tsunehiko Watase (Japanese: 渡瀬 恒彦, Hepburn: Watase Tsunehiko; July 28, 1944 – March 14, 2017) was a Japanese actor. He is best known for portraying Rintaro Kano in Keishicho Sosa Ikka 9 Gakari ("Homicide Team 9"). He won Best Supporting Actor at the 2nd Japan Academy Prize for The Incident and at the 3rd Hochi Film Award for The Incident, Kōtei no inai hachigatsu and The Fall of Ako Castle.

== Biography ==
=== 1944–1969: Pre-debut ===
Watase was born on July 28, 1944, in Shimane. He had an older brother, Michihiko Watase. He moved from his hometown of Shimane to Awaji, Tsuna, Hyōgo. In his junior high school exam, he had the second highest score, and in his third year of junior high school, he received his black belt in judo. He belonged to the swimming club in high school. His classmate, Hyōgo Prefectural Assemblyman Hiroshi Noma, recalled that Watase "was always reading Natsume Sōseki" and his Japanese score was always in the top 5 among 270 students. During high school, Watase aspired to be a newspaper reporter.

After graduating from high school, Watase was accepted into the Faculty of Law at Chuo University and Keio University, but not Waseda University. His older brother told him to go to Keio University, but after seeing his mother in tears over the rejection letter in the garden, he decided to retake the college exams a year later. Influenced by Shirou Ozaki's Theater of Life, he entered Waseda University's Faculty of Law. He began living with his older brother, who was attending Aoyama Gakuin University at the time. While at Waseda, he belonged to the karate club and was a second dan. He said he was "a sloppy student", his dream to become a newspaper reporter disappeared because the university had no lectures or graduation thesis at the height of student activism, and at one point he wrote a lot of poems, hoping to become a lyricist. Watase then thought that after graduating, he wanted to work in a job that was demanding and cutting-edge, and his brother advised him to "take the hard path". He got a job in public relations at Dentsu but quit the company after a month to work in sales at Japark, an advertising agency in Aoyama founded by his senior.

While working at Japark, an acquaintance of his brother started a real estate agency and did not have any advertising staff, so Watase would help on his days off. While there, Shigeru Okada, the head of Toei's planning and production department, asked him if he wanted to be an actor. His older brother, then an actor under the stage name Tetsuya Watari, opposed Watase entering the entertainment industry, saying it was a "premodern workplace" and that he wanted Watase to take the "normal, strict path". Concerned he was being used to lure his brother to Toei, Watase met Okada with the intention of refusing. However, after being told "just leave it to me", he was fascinated by his personality and decided that if there were more people like Okada in the world, he wanted to work with them, and he would give his all until he was 30.

=== 1970–1977: Debut, early roles ===
On January 31, 1970, Watase made his debut with the release of Killer Hitman Betsucho, in which he played the lead. He was the first young talent brought in from outside Toei to make their debut in a leading role since Hashizo Okawa. Watase had come to Kyoto without studying acting, stayed in the same room as the director, and attended all filming regardless of whether he was part of the scene or not. Though he doubted whether acting was right for him, Watase was too busy with work to worry. For Watase, action was the only element in which he could compete against great actors, and he was expected to be Toei's hope for an action star.

With Modern Yakuza: Three Bloody Sakura Brothers (1971), True Story: Private Ginza Police (1973), Karajishi Police (1974), a fierce and tragic murder between brothers played by Watase and Akira Kobayashi, and Jeans Blues: A Scoundrel With No Tomorrow (1974), where he played the Japanese Bonnie and Clyde with Meiko Kaji, Watase continued to play roles of outlaws struggling at the bottom. In 1977, while filming Hokuriku Proxy War, Watase was thrown out of an open Jeep, and his leg was crushed by the car. He was replaced by Goro Ibuki. The injury led him to change from an action actor to a character actor, expanding his range of roles.

Watase announced his engagement to actress Reiko Ohara, whom he co-starred with in Three Bees (1970), in February 1972. They married in 1973 and divorced in 1978.

=== 1978–1991: Expansion of roles ===
In 1978, Watase received Blue Ribbon and Kinema Junpo awards for his supporting roles in The Incident, his first role outside of Toei, and The Fall of Ako Castle. He was also nominated for the Japan Academy Film Prize for his leading role in the Shochiku film August Without an Emperor. In 1979, Watase won the Kinema Junpo Best Actor Award for his roles in Quivering Tongue and The Baby God Gave Me. Watase was enthusiastic about the film adaptation of Nobuhiko Kobayashi's novel Karajishi Corporation, but it was impossible to make a yakuza film at Shochiku; Kobayashi recalled that it was a great regret.

In a 2014 interview, Watase recalled that appearing in a Bathclin commercial was an opportunity to expand his horizons, connect with his audience more, and increase his recognition, as he had primarily appeared in serious roles.

=== 1992–2014: Increase in television roles ===
In 1994, Watase suffered a cerebral infarction, leaving him with a slight disability in his left hand. Although Watase continued to appear in films such as Crest of Betrayal, around this time he began appearing in more television dramas like Taxi Driver's Mystery Diary, which he had starred in since 1992. In the Inspector Totsugawa series, which he starred in from 1992 to 2015, producer Kazukiyo Morishita recalled that Watase was "not only an actor, but a staff member", having input on the script and sometimes directing the production.

In Chiri to Techin, which aired beginning in late 2007, Watase played Kusawaka Tsurezuritei, one of the four kings of rakugo in Kamigata. Though he struggled to play a role different from those he had played previously, feeling distant from a character that understood rakugo, Watase expressed a sense of accomplishment.

In 2012, Watase won the 20th Hashida Award for his starring roles in television dramas like Omiya-san.

=== 2015–2017: Later life and death ===
In August 2015, Watase was diagnosed with gallbladder cancer. His diagnosis was made public in May 2016. He died on March 14, 2017 due to multiple organ failure caused by the cancer.

== Reception and acting style ==
Director Sadao Nakajima said that Watase's interest in acting began when he met Ichirō Araki in Modern Yakuza: Three Bloody Sakura Brothers (1971). Araki's noisy acting style transformed Watase's previous acting style of simply throwing himself into it.

Watase did many of his stunts without a stunt double. In Crazy Beast (1976), Watase obtained a bus driver's license for a scene where a bus he is driving flips over. Nakajima praised Watase's athletic ability, as he was able to hang onto a helicopter as it took off. Gradually, Nakajima worried that Watase was becoming overconfident in his driving skills, as in Violent Panic:the big crash 1976), he was the only cast member to not use a stunt double for the climactic scene in which 200 cars and motorcycles collide.

== Filmography ==
=== Film ===
- Sympathy for the Underdog (1971)
- Wandering Ginza Butterfly (1972)
- Battles Without Honor and Humanity (1973)
- Battles Without Honor and Humanity: Proxy War (1973)
- Bodyguard Kiba 2 (1973)
- Aesthetics of a Bullet (1973)
- A True Story of the Private Ginza Police (1973)
- The Rapacious Jailbreaker (1974)
- New Battles Without Honor and Humanity (1974)
- New Battles Without Honor and Humanity: The Boss's Head (1975)
- Violent Panic: The Big Crash (1976)
- Legend of Dinosaurs & Monster Birds (1977)
- The Fall of Ako Castle (1978)
- The Incident (1978)
- Kōtei no Inai Hachigatsu (1978)
- Heaven Sent (1979)
- G.I. Samurai (1979)
- Virus (1980)
- Sailor Suit and Machine Gun (1981)
- The Gate of Youth (1981)
- Dotonbori River (1982)
- The Gate of Youth: Part 2 (1982)
- Antarctica (1983)
- Heaven and Earth (1990)
- Rex: A Dinosaur's Story (1993)
- Crest of Betrayal (1994)
- Tokyo Blackout (1987)
- Toki o Kakeru Shōjo (1997)
- Andromedia (1998)

=== Television ===
- Oshin (1983–1984)
- Sanada Taiheiki (1985–1986) – Sanada Nobuyuki
- Inspector Totsugawa Series (1992–2015) – Inspector Totsugawa
- Taxi Driver's Mystery Diary (1992–2016) – Yoake
- Homura Tatsu (1993–1994) – Fujiwara no Hidehira
- Musashi (2003)
- Keishicho Sosa Ikka 9 Gakari (2005–2017) – Rintaro Kano
- Omiya-san (2008–2009)
