= Kaoru Sugita =

Japanese actress and singer

- Born: Kaoru Hashimoto; November 27, 1964 (age 61); Shinjuku, Tokyo, Japan
- Occupations: Actress, singer
- Known for: Kinpachi-sensei

Kaoru Hashimoto (橋本 薫, Hashimoto Kaoru; born November 27, 1964 in Shinjuku, Tokyo), better known by her stage name Kaoru Sugita (杉田 かおる, Sugita Kaoru), is a Japanese actress and singer.

== Biography ==
She attended Myōjō Academy in Mitaka, later transferring to and graduating from NHK Gakuen (NHK Academy). At age 7, she made her debut in the NTV television series Papa to Yobanaide. She portrayed a pregnant middle-school student in an episode of the TBS series Kinpachi-sensei.

In the series Ikenaka Genta 80 Kilo, she not only played the female lead, but sang the song Tori no Uta.

She has also appeared in the films such as Oh! Oku and Dead or Alive.

== Filmography ==
=== Films ===
- Nutcracker Fantasy (1979)
- The Gate of Youth (1981)
- The Gate of Youth: Part 2 (1982)
- Tora-san Goes Religious? (1983)
- Dead or Alive (1999)
- Lakeside Murder Case (2004)
- Oh! Oku (2006)
- Welcome to the Village (2025)

=== Television ===
- Kinpachi-sensei (1979), Yukino Asai
- Ikenaka Genta 80 Kilo (1980)
- Sanbiki ga Kiru! (1987)
- Nurse Aoi (2006)
- Kurosagi (2006)
- Fushin no Toki: Woman Wars (2006)
- Blossom (2026), Namie Kimura

== Bibliography ==
- Joyū Gokko (1998)
