= Runin: Banished =

- Directed by: Eiji Okuda
- Written by: Izuru Narushima
- Starring: Keiko Matsuzaka; Kazuhiro Nishijima; Mariya Ito; Jinpachi Nezu; Eiji Okuda; Mayu Ozawa
- Production company: Zero Pictures
- Release dates: April 6, 2005 (Method Fest Independent Film Festival); January 14, 2004 (Japan)
- Running time: 149 minutes
- Country: Japan
- Language: Japanese

Runin: Banished (るにん, Runin) is a 2005 Japanese film directed by Eiji Okuda. The film is set in 1838, and follows the fate of various people exiled to remote Hachijo Island in the Pacific Ocean. The main character is Toyogiku, a courtesan exiled a number of years ago for arson, who longs to return to the mainland. The exiles often experience starvation, but are punished by death if caught trying to escape. The film's drama is provided by two new exiles, Kisaburo and Kacho, who upset the status quo on the island.

The cast includes Keiko Matsuzaka(Toyogiku, the exiled courtesan), Kazuhiro Nishijima (Kisaburo, the gambler), Mariya Ito (Kacho, the prostitute), Jinpachi Nezu (Inaba), Eiji Okuda (Kinjiro, the rich man) and Mayu Ozawa (Ochiyo).
