= Morio Kazama =

Japanese actor

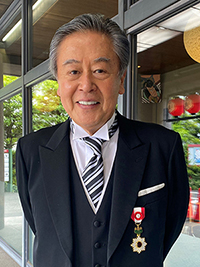
- 2023
- Born: April 26, 1949 (age 77); Setagaya, Tokyo, Japan
- Occupation: Actor
- Years active: 1957–present

Morio Kazama (風間杜夫, Kazama Morio) is a Japanese actor. He won the award for best supporting actor at the 2nd Yokohama Film Festival for Shiki Natsuko and Yūgure made and at the 6th and 7th Japan Academy Prizes.

Morio Kazama has been referred to as "The Japanese version of Alain Delon".

== Filmography ==
=== Films ===
- Wanpaku Ōji no Orochi Taiji (1963) – Childhood Zushiōmaru (voice, credited as Tomohito Sumita)
- Shiki Natsuko (1980)
- Yūgure made (1980)
- Fall Guy (1982) – Ginshirō
- The Rape (1982) – Shogo Ueda
- The Gate of Youth: Part 2 (1982) – Tatsuya Ogata
- Theater of Life (1983) - Miyagawa
- Shanghai Rhapsody (1984)
- The Tale of Genji (1987)
- A Chaos of Flowers (1988)
- Samurai Fiction (1998)
- The Wind Rises (2013) – Satomi (voice)
- A Bolt from the Blue (2014)
- Honnō-ji Hotel (2017)
- Flea-picking Samurai (2018)
- Underdog (2020)
- Asakusa Kid (2021)
- How to Forget You (2025) – Sawada
- Principal Examination (2025), Kishimoto

=== Television drama ===
- Tokyo Megure Keishi (1978) (episode 10)
- Onna Taikōki (1981) – Azai Nagamasa
- Stewardess Monogatari (1983) — Instructor Hiroshi Murasawa
- Byakkotai (1986) – Matsudaira Katamori
- Unmeitōge (1993) - Tokugawa Iemitsu
- Furuhata Ninzaburō (1996)
- Celeb to Binbō Tarō (2008)
- Massan (2015) – Kumatora Morino
- Segodon (2018) – Saigō Kichibei
- Yell (2020) – Mohei Gondō
- Japan Sinks: People of Hope (2021) – Makoto Ikushima
- Lost Man Found (2022) – Satoru's father
- Atom's Last Shot (2022) – Shigeo Tominaga

=== Television animation ===
- Akagi (2005–06) – Urabe

==== Live-action ====
- The X-Files (TV Asahi edition) – Fox Mulder (David Duchovny)

==== Animation ====
- The Simpsons – Fox Mulder

== Honours ==
- Medal with Purple Ribbon (2010)
- Order of the Rising Sun, 4th Class, Gold Rays with Rosette (2023)
