= Masumi Miyazaki =

Japanese actress and model (born 1968)

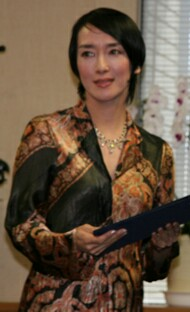
- 2007
- Born: January 26, 1968 (age 58); Nagoya, Aichi Prefecture, Japan
- Occupations: Actress, model
- Height: 1.62 m (5 ft 4 in)

Masumi Miyazaki (宮崎 萬純, Miyazaki Masumi) (born January 26, 1968, in Nagoya, Aichi Prefecture, Japan), is an actress and model. She graduated from the private Horikoshi High School, and made her film debut in the 1983 release Aiko 16-sai, and was selected as the 11th Clarion Girl in 1985. Miyazaki has appeared nude in multiple films, including XX Utsukushiki Kyōki (ＸＸ美しき凶器) and Yaneura no Sanposha (屋根裏の散歩者). She has also released nude photo books and appeared in the Japanese edition of Playboy.

In 1996, Miyazaki married and ceased work on her entertainment career. She now lives in the United States where she is a housewife and a lecturer. She resumed work as an entertainer in 2005. In November of that same year, Miyazaki announced that she had breast cancer.

== Filmography ==
- Aiko 16-sai (1983)
- Be-Bop High School (1985, Toei)
  - Be-bop High School: Kōkō Yotarō Aika (1986, Toei)
  - Be-bop High School: Kōkō Yotarō Kōshinkyoku (1987, Toei)
  - Be-bop High School: Kōkō Yotarō Kyōsōkyoku (1987, Toei)
  - Be-bop High School: Kōkō Yotarō Ondo (1988, Toei)
  - Be-bop High School: Kōkō Yotarō Kanketsuhen (1988, Toei)
- Fuyu Monogatari (1989, Toho)
- Zazie (1989)
- Black Princess: Jigoku no Tenshi (1990)
- Fūsen (1990)
- Isan Sōzoku (1990)
- Black Princess 2: Honō no Hyōteki (1991)
- Yumeji (1991)
- Yaneura no Sanpōsha (1992)
- Kokkai e Ikō (1993)
- Oedipus no Kyōjū (1993)
- XX Utsukushiki Kyōki (1993)
- Shingokudō no Tsuma-tachi: Horetara Jigoku (1994)
- Yaneura no Sanpōsha (1994)
- Sharaku (1995)
- Strange Circus (2005)

=== Television ===
- Tsūkai! OL Dōri (1986, TBS)
- Chocchan (1987, NHK)
- Takeda Shingen (1988, NHK), Ran
- Tokimeki Zakari (1988, Fuji TV)
- Nihon'ichi no Kattobu Otoko (1990, Fuji TV)
- Taiheiki (1991, NHK)
- Zutto Anata ga Suki Datta (1992, TBS)
- Shinkansen Monogatari '93 Natsu (1993, TBS)
- Uramiya Honpo (2006, TV Tokyo)
- Teppan Shōjo Akane (2006, TBS network)

=== Commercials ===
- Seiko Epson "Wordbank LXT" (1988)
- Lion "Marine Fresh" (1988)
- Shiseido "Fairwind Pact" (1988)
- Shiseido summer campaign (1989)
- Hitachi IC "Office Processor" (1990)
- Japan Ad Council "Early stage breast cancer mammography examination" (from 2006)

== Books ==
- XX-Holy Body
- XXX
