= Shiki Natsuko =

- DVD cover
- Directed by: Yōichi Higashi
- Screenplay by: Hiroyuki Itsuki
- Based on: Shiki Natsuko by Hiroyuki Itsuki
- Produced by: Katsuhiro Maeda; Toru Yoshida
- Starring: Setsuko Karasuma; Hitomi Kageyama; Yoko Aki; Morio Kazama; Hirotarō Honda
- Cinematography: Hiroichi Kawakami
- Edited by: Keiko Ichihara
- Music by: Michi Tanaka
- Production companies: Gentosha; Toei
- Distributed by: Toei
- Release date: August 6, 1980 (Japan)
- Running time: 120 minutes
- Country: Japan
- Language: Japanese
- Budget: ¥200 million
- Box office: ¥400 million

Shiki Natsuko (Japanese: 四季・奈津子), also known as Four Seasons: Natsuko, is a 1980 Japanese drama film directed by Yōichi Higashi, with a screenplay credited to author Hiroyuki Itsuki, based on his novel of the same name. The film follows the lives of Natsuko and her three sisters over the course of several months. It stars Setsuko Karasuma, Yoko Aki and Morio Kazama, and was released on August 6, 1980 by Toei, in Japan, where it was a financial success. The film's theme song, "Four Seasons - Natsuko" (四季・奈津子), was performed by the Japanese band Cherish, with music by Mikio Kasai and lyrics by Itsuki.

== Premise ==
A coming of age story in which an aimless young woman named Natsuko, feeling neglected and seeking new experiences, breaks off her relationship with her boyfriend and moves to Tokyo to live with her elder sister. She meets several strange characters along the way, all while figuring out what she wants to do with her life.

== Cast ==
- Setsuko Karasuma as Natsuko
- Hitomi Kageyama as Akiko
- Akiko Kana as Haruko
- Mitsuko Ota as Yuuko
- Yoko Aki as Kei
- Morio Kazama as Tatsuo Kanamori
- Hirotarō Honda as Nakagaki
- Shōhei Hino as Kawamoto
- Masumi Okada as Takahito Mori
- Nobuko Miyamoto as Mariko
- Teizô Muta as Natsuko's Father
- Yûsuke Okada as Dr. Sawaki
- Ryūichi Tamura as Sadao Kaneko
- Yoshio Shirai as Ryuusaku Kurokawa – Shirai, a prominent Japanese film critic, replaced Juzo Itami in the role after Itami suffered a heart attack.
- Nobuko Miyamoto as Mariko
- Keiji Fujiki as Fast Food Employee
- Hatsuo Yamaya as Chinese Restaurant's Chef
- Toshiya Fujita as Actor in Film (cameo)
- Masato Hoshi
- Shinobu Tsuruta

== Background ==
Shiki Natsuko was based on a novel of the same name by Hiroyuki Itsuki, the first in his Shiki series. The book was originally serialized by Shueisha in the women's magazine MORE before being published as a novel in November 1979. By the time of the film's release, the book had sold over one million copies in Japan. Itsuki intermittently published new installments in the series until 2000.

Itsuki said of his motivation for writing the novel: "I wanted to write an adventure story about an independent woman who doesn't cling to a man, against the backdrop of an era in which the number of working women is increasing and women's advancement in society is becoming more noticeable." Regarding the series as a whole, he said, "I wanted to weave in the changes that have occurred in Japan over the past 23 years while following the story of four sisters."

== Production ==
Director Yōichi Higashi was known for making films about women, but in an interview at the time of the film's release, he said, "I was constantly being offered films of the same vein, and to be honest, I was tired of women's films... [but] I didn't want to use young boys today as a subject because they're boring. Women live by their emotions, and even though what they say and what they do are contradictory, they live vividly and are moving overall, so I made two women's films in a row." Shiki Natsuko was Higashi's first foray into commercial cinema.

Higashi chose to shoot the film without a traditional script, instead employing a dialogue writer to write scenes each night and make revisions on set (considered a first for the Japanese film industry at the time). To keep the production on track, Higashi kept a rough outline of the story in his notebook. His assistant director also kept a copy of the novel on hand, informing the cast and crew in advance of which page and scene would be shot on which day. Higashi also allowed the cast to improv lines and took their opinions of the characters into account when ordering script revisions (Itsuki was credited for the final screenplay). The production shot 50,000 to 60,000 feet of film, rather than the usual 20,000 feet, which angered Toei. Director Higashi explained: "I don't like jobs that become familiar, so in that sense I may not be a professional director. Depending on how you look at it, my shooting style may be quite careless."

The film was shot entirely on location. Locations included Akasaka, Tokyo Station, Nerima, Fukuoka Airport and Iizuka.

== Release ==
Toei released Shiki Natsuko on August 6, 1980, in Japan. The film was a financial success, grossing double its budget at the box office.

== Awards ==
5th Hochi Film Award

- Won: Best Supporting Actress - Yoko Aki

2nd Yokohama Film Festival

- Won: Best Supporting Actor - Morio Kazama

54th Kinema Junpo Best Ten Awards

- Best Ten List: 7th place
