= Keiko Matsuzaka =

Japanese actress (born 1952)

- 清水慶子
- Born: Keiko Shimizu; July 20, 1952 (age 74); Tokyo, Japan
- Other names: Keiko Takauchi (髙内 慶子); Han Kyeong-ja (韓慶子)
- Years active: 1967–present
- Spouse: Haruhiko Takauchi (m. 1991)
- Children: 2

Keiko Matsuzaka (松坂 慶子, Matsuzaka Keiko; born July 20, 1952) is a Japanese actress.

== Early life ==
Matsuzaka was born on July 20, 1952, in Ōta, Tokyo; her father was a naturalized South Korean, while her mother was Japanese. She has a younger brother seven years junior.

== Career ==
In the 1960s, Matsuzaka became a child actress. Matsuzaka grew into adulthood in film working for Daiei and Shochiku.

Matsuzaka played the "Madonna" role in the 1981 film Naniwa no Koi no Torajirō, the 27th in the Otoko wa Tsurai yo series. The producers called on her again for that role in Torajirō no Endan, the 46th of the 49 installments (1993). Keiko also appeared in Legend of the Eight Samurai (1983), Shin Izakaya Yūrei (1996), Dr. Akagi by Shōhei Imamura (1998), Runin: Banished by Eiji Okuda (2004), and Inugamike no Ichizoku (scheduled for release in 2007). She won the award for best actress at the 6th Hochi Film Award for The Gate of Youth and Tora-san's Love in Osaka, and at the 15th Hochi Film Award for The Sting of Death.

Her early television appearances have included the tokusatsu superhero series Ultra Seven (1968). She portrayed Nohime, wife of Oda Nobunaga, in the 1973 NHK Taiga drama Kunitori Monogatari. From 1973 to 1981, she appeared in Edo o Kiru, including five seasons as the character Oyuki. The 1975 Taiga drama Genroku Taiheiki featured Keiko as Aguri (Yōzen'in), the wife and later widow of Asano Naganori in the dramatization of the events of the forty-seven rōnin. She then appeared in Kusa Moeru in the same time slot in 1979, and portrayed Sada (Kawakami Sadayakko), the lead role in the 1985 Taiga drama Haru no Hatō. Having portrayed Aguri, Keiko also played Riku, the wife of Oishi Yoshio, in Chūshingura Yōzen'in no Inbō, broadcast on January 2, 2007. She played Taira no Tokiko in the 2005 NHK Taiga drama Yoshitsune. She has made numerous other television appearances in series and specials, jidaigeki, contemporary dramas, and variety shows. Recently she is portrayed "Ikushima" in the 2008 NHK Taiga Drama Atsuhime.

Matsuzaka has represented a variety of products and companies in television commercials. These include Nippon Menard Cosmetic Co., Nissin Foods, Yutoku Pharmaceutical Industries, Nissan Sunny, Rohto Pharmaceutical Co., Kleenex, and Ōtsuka Foods.

Among her other works are songs released in 1979 and 2002, and a book of photographs of her, also in 2002.

== Personal life ==
In 1991, Matsuzaka married jazz guitarist Haruhiko Takauchi (Haru Takauchi). Their wedding ceremony took place in New York on January 2nd. She gave birth to her first daughter in 1992 and her second daughter in 1994.

At the time, a marriage between a popular actress and a relatively unknown musician, who earned little, was criticized by the public and media alike as a "marriage of inequality." Matsuzaka's parents also made no secret of their strong opposition to the marriage and revealed their thoughts through interviews with the media. Matsuzaka initially protected her husband, Takauchi, but eventually declared estrangement from her father. After their marriage, she moved to New York, where her husband was based, and spent seven years there.

== Filmography ==
=== Films ===
- Green Light to Joy (1967)
- Rikugun rakugohei (1971)
- Ju hyo ereji (1971)
- Play (1971)
- Kuro no honryu, a.k.a. Ordinary Darkness (1972)
- Miyamoto Musashi, a.k.a. Sword of Fury (1973)
- Ai yori aoku (1973)
- Stray Dog (1973)
- The Last Samurai (1974)
- Double Clutch (1978)
- The Incident (1978)
- Bandits vs. Samurai Squadron (1978)
- The Three Undelivered Letters (1979)
- Nichiren (1979)
- Bad Sorts (1980)
- May love be restored (1980)
- The Gate of Youth (1981)
- Tora-san's Love in Osaka (1981)
- Lovers Lost (1982)
- The Go Masters (1982)
- Fall Guy (1982)
- Theater of Life (1983) as Osode
- Meiso chizu (1983)
- Legend of the Eight Samurai (1983)
- The Go Masters (1983)
- Make-up (1984)
- Shanghai Rhapsody (1984) as Madoka "Madonna" Hatano
- Nezumi kozo kaito den (1984)
- House on Fire (1987)
- Beyond the Shining Sea (1986)
- Hissatsu! III Ura ka Omote ka (1986)
- Final Take: The Golden Age of Movies (1986)
- Carefree Goddesses (1987)
- The Great Department Store Robbery (1987)
- Lady Camellia, a.k.a. Princess Tsubuki (1988)
- Hana no ran, a.k.a. A Chaos of Flowers (1988)
- The Sting of Death (1990)
- Goodbye Mama (1991)
- Otoko wa Tsurai yo: Tora-san's Matchmaker (1993)
- A Mature Woman (1994)
- Shin izakaya yurei (1996)
- Dr. Akagi (1998)
- Ping Pong Bath Station (1998)
- Sakuya: Slayer of Demons (2000)
- Pinch Runner (2000)
- The Happiness of the Katakuris (2001)
- The Ripples (2002)
- The Boat to Heaven (2003)
- Runin: Banished (2004)
- Colour Blossoms (2004)
- Miracle in Four Days (2005)
- Waru (2006)
- The Go Master (2006)
- The Inugamis (2006)
- Legend of the Demon Cat (2017)
- The House Where the Mermaid Sleeps (2018)
- Boku ni Aitakatta (2019)
- Ano Niwa no Tobira o Aketatoki (2022)
- Don't Call It Mystery: The Movie (2023) as Mariko Koinuma
- Till We Meet Again on the Lily Hill (2023) as Tsuru
- Unforgettable (2025) as Ritsuko Mamiya
- Till We Meet Again on the Starry Hill (2026)

=== Television ===
- Ultra Seven (1968)
- Kunitori Monogatari (1973) - Nōhime
- Edo o Kiru (1973–1981)
- Genroku Taiheiki (1975)
- Kusa Moeru (1979)
- Akō Rōshi (1979)
- Sekigahara (1981) - Hatsume
- Magical Mystery Theater: "The Woman in the Black Mansion" (February 25, 1982) & "Jealousy" (Part 1: March 4, 1982, Part 2: March 11, 1982)
- Haru no Hatō (1985) - Sada Yacco
- Skip (1996)
- Mōri Motonari (1997) - Sugi no Kata
- Prince Shotoku (2001)
- Part-Time Detective (2002) as Noriko Yamada
- Part-Time Detective 2 (2004) as Noriko Yamada
- Proof of the Man (2004)
- Yoshitsune (2005) - Taira no Tokiko
- Chūshingura Yōzen'in no Inbō (2007)
- Atsuhime (2008) - Ikushima
- Burning Flower (2015)
- Here Comes Asa! (2016)
- Segodon (2018) - Saigō Masa
- Manpuku (2018)
- Ōoku the Final (2019) - Jōen-in
- Doctor-X: Surgeon Michiko Daimon (2019)
- Ashita no Kazoku (2020)
- The Makanai: Cooking for the Maiko House (2023) - Chiyo
- Ranman (2023) - Taki Makino and old Chizuru Makino
- Asura (2025) - Fuji

== Music ==
Her song "Ai No Suichuka" (愛の水中花) (1979) reached number 2 on the Oricon Singles Chart and the Music Labo singles chart.

== Awards and nominations ==
- Japan Academy Prize
  - Japan Academy Prize for Outstanding Performance by an Actress in a Leading Role nomination in Jiken (1978)
  - Japan Academy Prize for Outstanding Performance by an Actress in a Leading Role nomination in The Three Undelivered Letters (1979)
  - Japan Academy Prize for Outstanding Performance by an Actress in a Leading Role nomination in The Wicked (1980)
  - Japan Academy Prize for Popularity Award in The Wicked (1980)
  - Japan Academy Prize for Outstanding Performance by an Actress in a Leading Role in The Gate of Youth and Otoko wa Tsurai yo: Tora-San's Love in Osaka (1981)
  - Japan Academy Prize for Outstanding Performance by an Actress in a Leading Role in Fall Guy and Lovers Lost (1982)
  - Japan Academy Prize for Outstanding Performance by an Actress in a Leading Role nomination in Shanghai Rhapsody and Kesho (1984)
  - Japan Academy Prize for Outstanding Performance by an Actress in a Leading Role nomination in House on Fire and Hako Kirameku Hate (1986)
  - Japan Academy Prize for Outstanding Performance by an Actress in a Leading Role nomination in Onna Sakasemasu and Princess Tsubaki (1987)
  - Japan Academy Prize for Outstanding Performance by an Actress in a Leading Role in The Sting of Death (1990)
  - _{Matsuzaka is the only actress who received consecutive lead actress award, and is one of the two actresses to have won three or more competitive awards for acting in leading role, preceded by Sayuri Yoshinaga with 4 awards}
- Blue Ribbon Awards
  - Blue Ribbon Awards for Best Actress in The Gate of Youth and Otoko wa Tsurai yo: Tora-San's Love in Osaka (1981)
  - Blue Ribbon Awards for Best Actress in The Sting of Death (1990)
- Kinema Junpo Awards
  - Kinema Junpo Award for Best Actress in Fall Guy (1982)
  - Kinema Junpo Award for Best Actress in The Sting of Death (1990)
- Mainichi Film Awards
  - Mainichi Film Award for Best Actress in Fall Guy and Lovers Lost (1982)
  - Mainichi Film Award for Best Actress in The Sting of Death (1990)
  - Mainichi Film Award for Tanaka Kinuyo Life Achievement Award (1997)
  - Mainichi Film Award for Best Supporting Actress in Sakuya: Slayer of Demons (2000)
  - Mainichi Film Award for Best Supporting Actress in Grave of the Fireflies (2008)
- Hochi Film Award
  - Hochi Film Award for Best Actress in The Gate of Youth and Otoko wa Tsurai yo: Tora-San's Love in Osaka (1981)
  - Hochi Film Award for Best Actress in The Sting of Death (1990)
- Nikkan Sports Film Award
  - Nikkan Sports Film Award for Best Actress in The Sting of Death (1990)
- Miscellaneous awards
  - Yokohama Film Festival for Life Achievement Award (1983)
  - Method Fest Independent Film Festival for Festival Director's Award in Runin: Banished (2004)
  - Osaka International Film Festival for Best Actress in Osaka Hamlet (2010)
- Elan d'or Awards
  - Newcomer of the Year (1973)

== Honours ==
- 60th NHK Broadcast Cultural Award (2008)
- Medal with Purple Ribbon (2009)
- Order of the Rising Sun, 4th Class, Gold Rays with Rosette (2026)
