= Tora-san's Love in Osaka =

- Theatrical poster
- Directed by: Yoji Yamada
- Written by: Yoji Yamada; Yoshitaka Asama
- Starring: Kiyoshi Atsumi; Keiko Matsuzaka
- Cinematography: Tetsuo Takaba
- Edited by: Iwao Ishii
- Music by: Naozumi Yamamoto
- Distributed by: Shochiku
- Release date: August 8, 1981
- Running time: 104 minutes
- Country: Japan
- Language: Japanese

Tora-san's Love in Osaka (男はつらいよ 浪花の恋の寅次郎, Otoko wa Tsurai yo: Naniwa no Koi no Torajirō) aka Tora's Many-Splintered Love is a 1981 Japanese comedy film directed by Yoji Yamada. It stars Kiyoshi Atsumi as Torajirō Kuruma (Tora-san), and Keiko Matsuzaka as his love interest or "Madonna". Tora-san's Love in Osaka is the twenty-seventh entry in the popular, long-running Otoko wa Tsurai yo series. It was the first film in the series in which Hidetaka Yoshioka played the role of Tora-san's nephew Mitsuo Suwa.

== Synopsis ==
When his travels bring him to Osaka, Tora-san falls in love with a local geisha. He helps her to track down her estranged brother, and informs his family that he plans to marry her. His plans are foiled when the geisha informs Tora-san that she is engaged.

== Cast ==
- Kiyoshi Atsumi as Torajirō
- Chieko Baisho as Sakura
- Keiko Matsuzaka as Fumi Hamada
- Shimojo Masami as Kuruma Tatsuzō
- Chieko Misaki as Tsune Kuruma (Torajiro's aunt)
- Gin Maeda as Hiroshi Suwa
- Hidetaka Yoshioka as Mitsuo Suwa
- Hisao Dazai as Boss (Umetarō Katsura)
- Gajirō Satō as Genkō
- Chishū Ryū as Gozen-sama
- Kannosuke Ashiya as Kikai

== Critical appraisal ==
Tora-san's Love in Osaka was the fifth top box-office money-maker in Japan for 1981. For her role in the film Keiko Matsuzaka was named Best Actress at the Japan Academy Prize and Blue Ribbon Awards. Kiyoshi Atsumi was nominated for Best Actor by the Japanese Academy.

Stuart Galbraith IV writes that Tora-san's Love in Osaka is an "above-average entry in this consistently excellent series". He points out that some of the film's humor may be lost on western viewers since it stems from the contrast between Tokyo and Osaka culture. Director Yamada, according to Galbraith, "obviously favors rural, remote Japan to sprawling urban landscapes like Osaka," but nevertheless, "the film plays as a heartfelt valentine to the city and its people." The German-language site molodezhnaja gives Tora-san's Love in Osaka three and a half out of five stars.

== Availability ==
Tora-san's Love in Osaka was released theatrically on August 8, 1981. In Japan, the film was released on videotape in 1986 and 1996, and in DVD format in 1998, 2002 and 2008.

== Bibliography ==
=== English ===
- "OTOKO WA TSURAI YO NANIWA NO KOI NO TORAJIRO (1981)". British Film Institute. Archived from the original on 2012-10-17.
- "OTOKO WA TSURAIYO -NANIWA NO KOI NO TORAJIRO". Complete Index to World Film.
- Otoko wa tsurai yo: Naniwa no koi no Torajirô (1981) at IMDb
- Galbraith IV, Stuart (2006-08-11). "Tora-san 27: Tora-san's Many-splintered Love (Region 3)". DVD Talk.

=== German ===
- "Tora-San's Many-Splintered Love" (in German). www.molodezhnaja.ch.

=== Japanese ===
- 男はつらいよ 浪花の恋の寅次郎 (1981) (in Japanese). allcinema.net.
- "男はつらいよ 浪花の恋の寅次郎". Japanese Cinema Database (Agency for Cultural Affairs). Archived from the original on 2014-02-26.
- 男はつらいよ 浪花の恋の寅次郎 (in Japanese). Japanese Movie Database.
- 男はつらいよ 浪花の恋の寅次郎 (in Japanese). Kinema Junpo. Archived from the original on 2012-03-21.
