= Clarion (company) =

Japanese manufacturer

Faurecia Clarion Electronics Co., Ltd.
- Native name: フォルシアクラリオン・エレクトロニクス株式会社
- Romanized name: Forushia Kurarion Erekutoronikusu kabushiki gaisha
- Type: Subsidiary (kabushiki gaisha)
- Industry: Automotive; Consumer electronics
- Founded: December 18, 1940
- Headquarters: Saitama, Saitama, Japan
- Key people: Tatsuhiko Izumi (Representative Director, Chairman and CEO) Hidetoshi Kawamoto (Representative Director, President and COO)
- Products: Car audio and automotive navigation systems
- Number of employees: 10,037 (Consolidated)
- Parent: Forvia
- Website: clarion.com

Faurecia Clarion Electronics Co., Ltd. (フォルシアクラリオン・エレクトロニクス株式会社, Forushia Kurarion Erekutoronikusu kabushiki gaisha) is a Japanese manufacturer of car audio, automotive navigation systems, AutoPCs, visual equipment, bus equipment, and communication equipment. Since 2019 it has been fully owned by Faurecia Clarion Electronics.

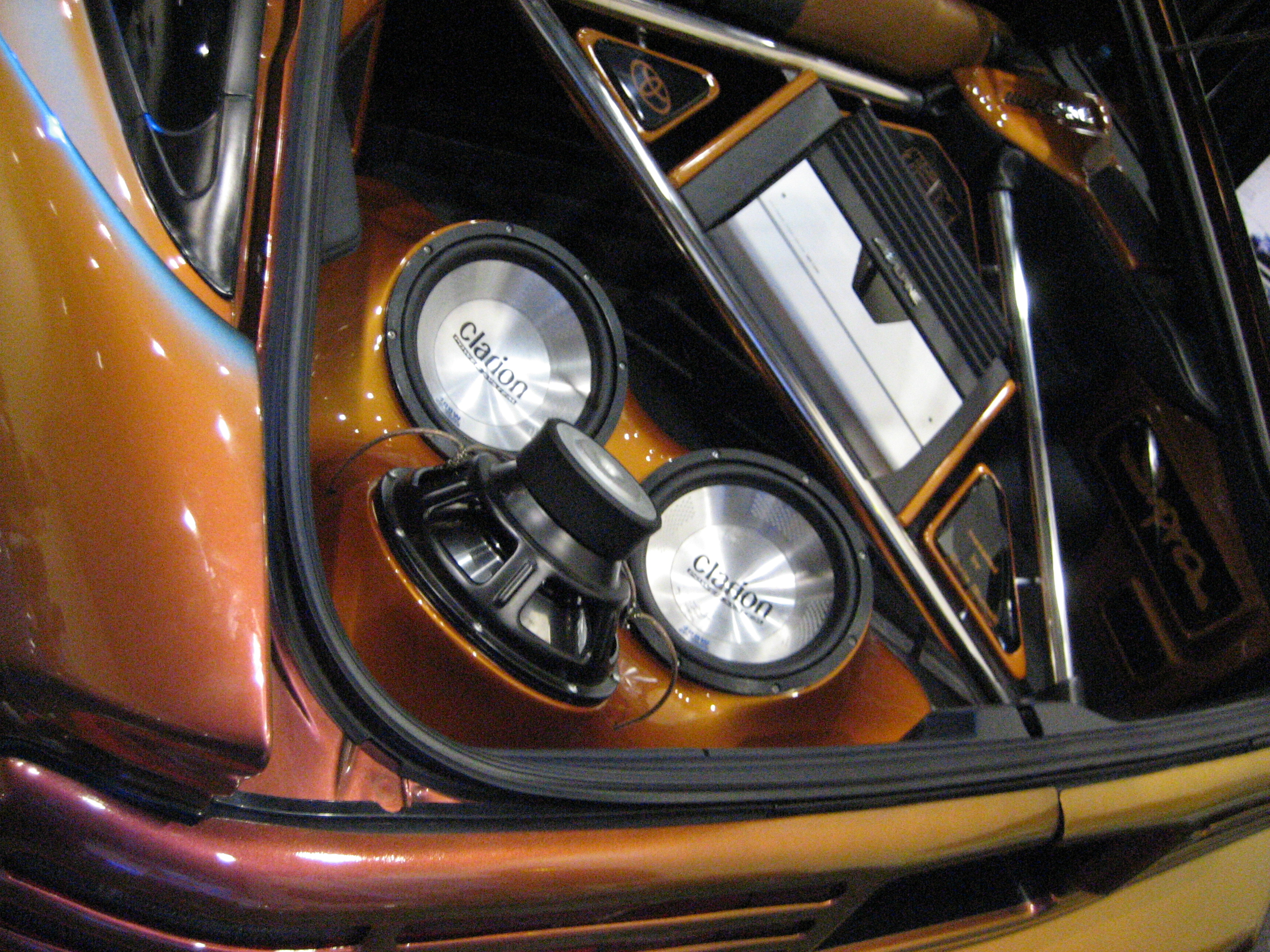
A Clarion sound system in the trunk/boot of a car.

Up until the end of 2005, products in Japan were marketed under the brand name AddZest, while outside Japan the same product typically carried the Clarion name brand. This was changed in 2006, and the brand "Clarion" along with a redesigned logo are now used worldwide. It is known for its close relationship with Nissan, which uses Clarion products almost exclusively in its vehicles. Nissan once owned a 6.25% share in Clarion, although that was reduced in 2002.

Clarion manufacturers aftermarket car audio and speakers for vehicles.

A contest is held annually to select the Clarion Girl, who is chosen to represent Clarion's car audio equipment in television and print advertising campaigns during the following year. The contest was started in 1975, and is now co-sponsored by Fuji TV.

== History ==
- December 1940 – Established as Hakusan Wireless Electric Company in 21 Hakusanmae-cho, Bunkyo-ku, Tokyo; begins manufacturing battery-operated household radios.
- November 1943 – Merges with Takizawa Wireless Electric Industries Co., Ltd.; renamed Teikoku Dempa Co., Ltd.
- December 1970 – Trade name changed to Clarion Co., Ltd.
- December 1970 – First overseas factory established as a joint venture in Malaysia.
- July 1983 – Factory established in France.
- October 1989 – Manufacturing company established in the Philippines.
- January 1995 – Clarion Orient Co. established in Hong Kong.
- March 1995 – ISO9001 certification obtained at all Clarion business sites.
- April 1995 – Manufacturing company established in China.
- October 1997 – Manufacturing company established in Hungary.
- January 1998 – In-car PC “Clarion AutoPC” jointly developed with Microsoft Corporation.
- December 1998 – Launch of the world's first in-vehicle computer "AutoPC" in the United States.
- December 1999 – OEM supply of "AutoPC" to French automaker Citroën begins.
- November 2001 – “AutoPC CADIAS” exhibits at Tokyo Motor Show.
- March 2002 – Launch of satellite radio receiver in North America.
- August 2003 – Started supplying CD car audio to Shanghai GM, China.
- February 2004 – World First Launch of Linux, Java J2ME CDC equipped in-vehicle information terminal for commercial vehicles.
- December 2006 – Becomes a Hitachi Group company.
- January 2007 – Xanavi Informatics Corporation becomes a wholly owned subsidiary.
- November 2008 – Launch of mobile communication terminal “ClarionMiND” in North America.
- April 2009 – Wholly owned subsidiary Xanavi Informatics Corp. is absorbed and merged.
- January 2010 – Car audio supplied to Tata Motors, India for its "Nano" car.
- October 2010 – Registered Head Office transferred to Saitama Shintoshin; renamed "Registered Head Office/Technology Center".
- March 2011 – World's first in-vehicle full-digital speakers developed.
- June 2012 – "Smart Access" cloud-based information network service for vehicles launches in North America.
- May 2013 – Sales company established in India.
- September 2015 – Development and release of a new Full Digital Sound
- August 2018- JL Audio assumes responsibility for Clarion's Marine Audio Electronics and Accessories Business in North America, South America, Australia and New Zealand.
- October 2018 - Faurecia Automotive announces plans to acquire 100% of Clarion to form a new business unit Faurecia Clarion Electronic Systems to be headquartered in Tokyo Japan, transaction is expected to be complete in the first quarter of 2019.
- System(Dnote®) licensed by Trigence, Demo exhibition held at the Frankfurt Motor Show.
- March 2021 - JL Audio has expanded its exclusive licensing agreement with the Clarion brand. Initially restricted to marine products, this license now extends to the powersports and recreational vehicle (RV) markets. The expansion aims to enhance JL Audio's marketing, sales, and support efforts across these additional sectors.
