= Station (1981 film) =

- Theatrical poster for Station (1981)
- Directed by: Yasuo Furuhata
- Written by: Sō Kuramoto
- Produced by: Hitoshi Ogura
- Starring: Ken Takakura; Chieko Baisho
- Cinematography: Daisaku Kimura
- Edited by: Nobuo Ogawa
- Music by: Ryudo Uzaki
- Distributed by: Toho
- Release date: November 7, 1981 (Japan)
- Running time: 132 minutes
- Country: Japan
- Language: Japanese

Station (Japanese: 駅 STATION, Hepburn: Eki Station) is a 1981 Japanese drama film directed by Yasuo Furuhata. Among many awards, it was chosen as Best Film at the Japan Academy Film Prize ceremony.

== Plot ==
A detective goes out of his way to crack the case of a serial killer who specializes in murdering police officers.

== Cast ==
- Ken Takakura: Eiji Mikami
- Chieko Baisho: Kiriko (1979) Michio
- Ayumi Ishida: Naoko Mikami (1968)
- Setsuko Karasuma: Suzuko Yoshimatsu (1976)
- Kai Atō: Ryosuke Honjo
- Yu Fujiki: Ichiro Mikami
- Akihiko Hirata
- Ryō Ikebe: Chief Nakagawa
- Ken Iwabuchi: Yoshitaka Mikami
- Tanie Kitabayashi: Masayo Mikami
- Yuko Kotegawa: Fuyuko Mikami
- Sachiko Murase: Ryosuke's mother
- Hideo Murota: Shigeru Morioka
- Toshiyuki Nagashima: Michio Mikami
- Akira Nagoya: Takada
- Jinpachi Nezu: Goro Yoshimatsu
- Junkichi Orimoto
- Hideji Otaki: Aiba
- Nenji Kobayashi : Detective Tasumi
- Kei Satō
- Tetsuya Takeda
- Masao Komatsu
- Kunie Tanaka: Sugawara
- Minori Terada: Chikaraishi
- Ryudo Uzaki: Yukio Kinoshita
- Masako Yagi: Aiba's wife

== Reception ==
=== Awards and nominations ===
5th Japan Academy Prize

- Won: Best Picture
- Won: Best Screenplay - Sou Kuramoto
- Won: Best Actor - Ken Takakura
- Won: Best Music - Ryudo Uzaki
- Won: Best Sound Recording - Nobuyuki Tanaka
- Nominated: Best Director - Yasuo Furuhata
- Nominated: Best Actress - Chieko Baisho
- Nominated: Best Actor in a Supporting Role - Ryudo Uzaki
- Nominated: Best Actress in a Supporting Role - Ayumi Ishida and Setsuko Karasuma
- Nominated: Best Cinematography - Daisaku Kimura
- Nominated: Best Lighting Direction - Hideki Mochizuki
- Nominated: Best Art Direction - Yukio Higuchi

== Bibliography ==
- Eki Station (1981) at IMDb
- "駅 STATION" (in Japanese). Japanese Movie Database.
- "駅 STATION" (in Japanese). Variety Japan.
- "駅 STATION" (in Japanese). allcinema.net.
- "EKI". The Complete Index to World Film. Archived from the original on 2012-04-06.
