= Hiroyuki Itsuki =

Japanese novelist and writer

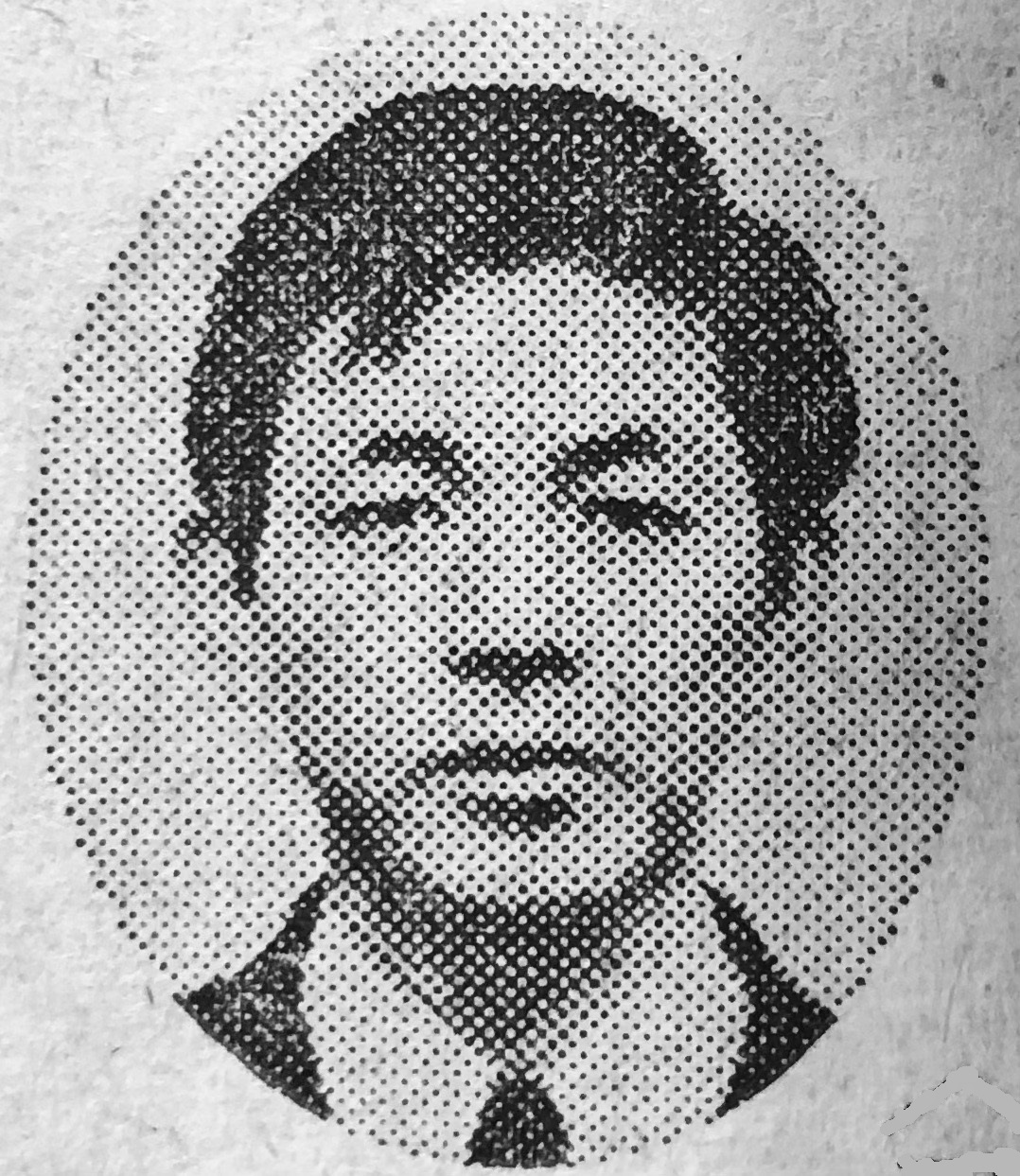
- Itsuki in 1967
- Born: Hiroyuki Matsunobu; 20 September 1932 (age 93); Yame District, Fukuoka
- Writing career
- Notable works: The Gate of Youth; Tariki: Embracing Despair, Discovering Peace

Hiroyuki Itsuki (Japanese: 五木 寛之, born September 30, 1932) is a Japanese novelist, essayist and lyricist, best known in Japan by his novel The Gate of Youth and in the English-speaking world by Tariki: Embracing Despair, Discovering Peace.

== Career ==
Hiroyuki Matsunobu (Japanese: 松延 寛之) was born in Yame District, Fukuoka Prefecture, in 1932. He spent his early childhood in Korea and returned to Fukuoka at the end of World War II.

In his middle and high school days, he loved reading the novels by the Russian authors, such as Gogol, Chekhov, Turgenev and Dostoyevsky. In 1952, he enrolled himself in the Russian Literature Department of Waseda University, but did not complete college education due to financial difficulty.

After working in Tokyo as a coordinator and a lyricist for the radio programs about ten years, he married Reiko Oka, his college sweetheart and a medical doctor, in 1965, and moved to his wife's town of Kanazawa. He assumed his last name of Itsuki, as one of her wife's uncles did not have children.

In 1965, Itsuki traveled with his wife to the Soviet Union and Scandinavia and published his novel Good-bye to Moscow Hoodlums (Japanese: さらばモスクワ愚連隊), for which he was awarded Shosetu Gendai magazine's new author prize. In 1967 he received the 56th Naoki Prize (1966下) for Aozameta uma o miyo (蒼ざめた馬を見よ, Look at the Pale-Faced Horse). His 1968 novel, The Young Ones Will Aim to Walk in the Wilderness (Japanese: 青年は荒野をめざす), about a Japanese trumpeter's adventure of jazz, sex, and alcohol in Nakhotka, Moscow, Helsinki, Paris and Madrid, and its movie with the theme song by The Folk Crusaders (its lyrics by Itsuki) were a big hit among those who spend their youth in the late 1960s. In 1970, he moved to Yokohama.

In 1973, The Tomb of a Toki (Japanese: 朱鷺の墓), another novel on the Russian theme, was published. In 1974, Itsuki translated Richard Bach's Jonathan Livingston Seagull into Japanese, which became a best seller. From 1969 to 1993, he wrote a novel series titled The Gate of Youth (Japanese: 青春の門) about the life of Shinsuke Ibuki in eight volumes, for the first of which he received the Eiji Yoshikawa Prize in 1976.

Starting in 1981, he studied the history of Buddhism as a special student at Ryukoku University, Kyoto, and in 2001 he published Tariki: Embracing Despair, Discovering Peace in English, which was awarded the Book of the Year prize in the spiritual department. His latest books include Shinran (Japanese: 親鸞) in three volumes (2014), which was serialized with illustrations by Akira Yamaguchi and won the 64th Mainichi Publishing Culture Award Special Prize in 2010.

== See also ==
- Naoki Prize
