= 38th Tokyo International Film Festival =

2025 Japanese film festival

- Official poster
- Opening film: Climbing for Life by Junji Sakamoto
- Closing film: Hamnet by Chloé Zhao
- Location: Tokyo, Japan
- Founded: 1985
- Awards: Tokyo Grand Prix: Palestine 36
- Hosted by: UNIJAPAN; Ministry of Economy, Trade and Industry; Japan Foundation; Tokyo Metropolitan Government
- Artistic director: Koshino Junko
- No. of films: 184
- Festival date: Opening: October 27, 2025; Closing: November 5, 2025
- Website: 2025 TIFF

Tokyo International Film Festival
- 39th 37th

The 38th Tokyo International Film Festival took place from 27 October to 5 November 2025 at Yūrakuchō-Marunouchi-Ginza area. The festival opened with 2025 Japanese biographical film Climbing for Life directed by Junji Sakamoto about the life of Junko Tabei. The opening was attended by the director Sakamoto, Sayuri Yoshinaga, Rena Nōnen, festival navigator Kumi Takiuchi, and other Japanese and international stars, including Takumi Saitoh, Misato Morita, China’s Fan Bingbing and Peter Chan, and French actress Juliette Binoche.

Carlo Chatrian, Italian journalist, author and programmer served as the Jury President of international competition. Chloé Zhao, Chinese-born filmmaker, and Lee Sang-il, Japanese-born film director and screenwriter, were honoured with Kurosawa Akira Award for their extraordinary contributions to world cinema. Sayuri Yoshinaga, Japanese actress and activist and Yoji Yamada, Japanese film director, will be honoured with Lifetime Achievement Award.

The closing ceremony was held on November 5, 2025, where the various awards were announced. Palestine 36, a 2025 historical drama written and directed by Annemarie Jacir won the Tokyo Grand Prix, while 2025 documentary film We Are the Fruits of the Forest by Rithy Panh won the Special Jury Prize. The festival closed with the screening of an American–British co-produced historical drama Hamnet by Chloé Zhao.

== Overview ==
The film registration for the festival began in April 2025 with the closing date for submission fixed for July 7, 2025.

Takiuchi Kumi was appointed this year's festival navigator. She will "navigate" the audience at official events as the face of the festival.

The poster unveiled on September 19, was created by Japanese graphic designer Oshima Idea in collaboration with Rikiya Imaizumi, a Japanese director. Inspired by the theme of observation and emotional connection, the poster depicts a scene set in a Tokyo café where two women discuss topics like love, war, and politics. Hoshi Moeka portrays the older woman, who complains about her boyfriend, while Ca Non, from the idol group Gang Parade, plays the younger woman who has feelings for the other woman. The poster uses black-and-white stills to reflect the subtle emotional tension between the characters.

The festival unveiled the full lineup of the 38th edition in a press conference held on October 1, 2025.

The festival concluded on November 5, 2025 with Michael Rivas as master of ceremonies. Yuriko Koike, Governor of Tokyo was chief guest. In this edition 184 films were screened, with 69,162 admissions. 163,009 audience attended the various events held during the festival.

== Juries ==
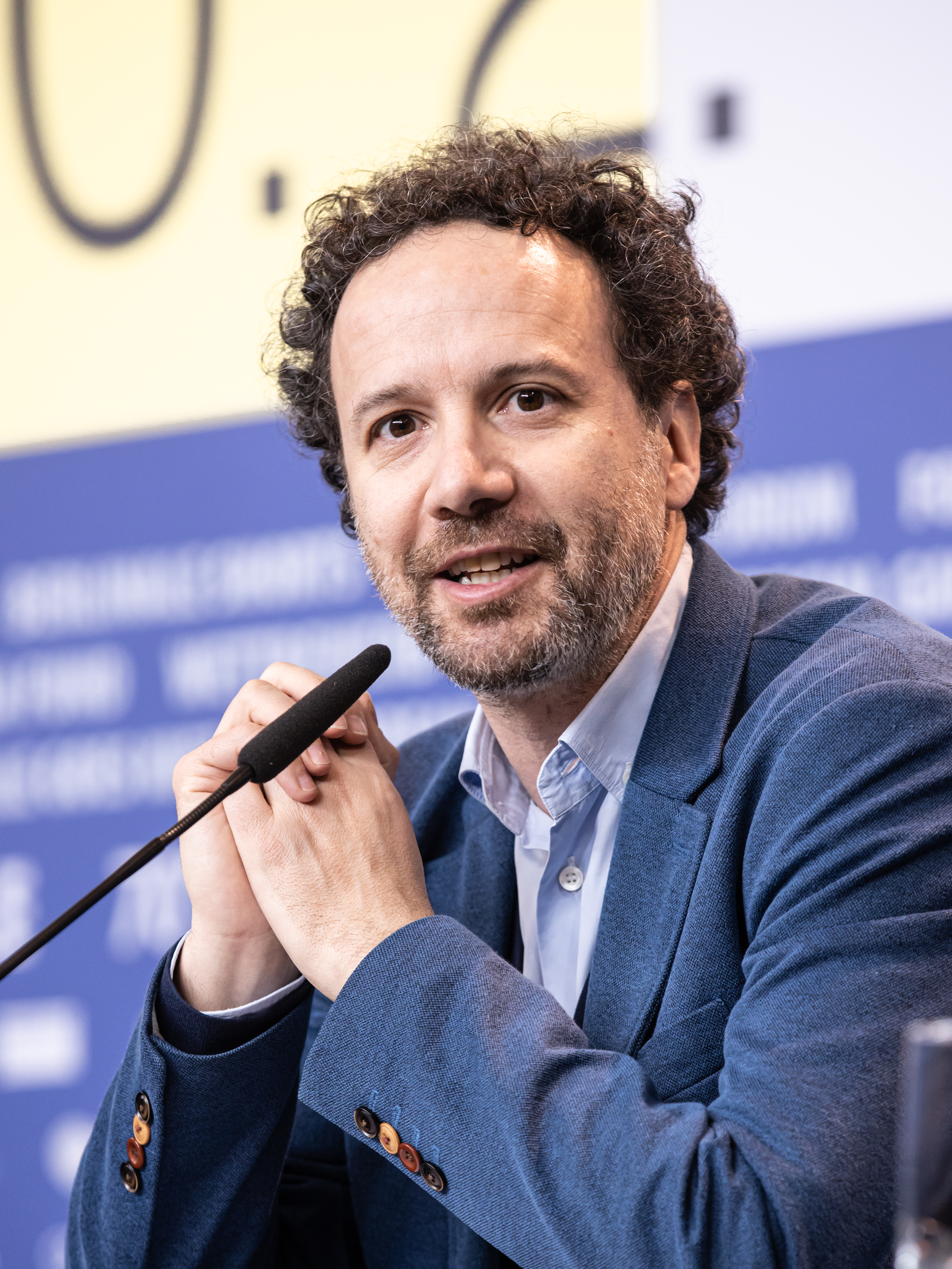
Carlo Chatrian, Jury president, Main competition

The juries consists of the following members:

=== Main competition ===
- Carlo Chatrian, journalist, cinema critic and artistic director – Jury president
- Gwei Lun-mei, Taiwanese actress
- Matthieu Laclau, Film editor
- Takumi Saitoh, Japanese actor and filmmaker
- Vivian Qu, Chinese film director, screenwriter and producer

=== TIFF Ethical Film Award ===
- Elaiza Ikeda, Philippine-born Japanese actress, fashion model and singer, President of the jury
- Uozumi Soichiro
- Sudo Rimi
- Tsumura Yuka

=== Asian Future Jury ===
- Ellen Y.D. Kim, Director of Asian Contents & Film Market, Busan International Film Festival
- Matsunaga Daishi, Director
- Nishizawa Akihiro, Programming Manager

== Screening venues ==
The following venues will host the festival screenings.

- Marunouchi TOEI
- Marunouchi Piccadilly
- Toho Cinemas Hibiya
- Yurakucho Yomiuri Hall
- Kadokawa Cinema Yurakucho
- Humantrust Cinema Yurakucho
- Cine Switch Ginza (Chuo City)
- Toho Cinemas, Chanter
- Hulic Hall Tokyo
- Hibiya Step Square
- LEXUS MEETS...
- Mitsubishi Building 1F M+ Success
- Tokyo Takarazuka Theater (Chiyoda, Tokyo)

== Official Selection ==
The festival from this year will consist of ten main sections.

=== Opening and closing films ===
Climbing for Life by Junji Sakamoto will be opening film of the festival to commemorate the 50th anniversary of Junko Tabei's Everest achievement.

English title	Original title	Director(s)	Production country(ies)
Opening film
Climbing for Life	てっぺんの向こうにあなたがいる	Junji Sakamoto	Japan
Centerpiece Screening
Tokyo Taxi	TOKYOタクシー	Yoji Yamada	Japan
Closing film
Hamnet		Chloé Zhao	United Kingdom, United States

=== International Competition ===
The main competition has 15 films vying for Tokyo Grand Prix.

English Title	Original Title	Director(s)	Production Country
Atropia		Hailey Gates	United States
Blonde	金髪	Sakashita Yuichiro	Japan
Echoes of Motherhood	恒星の向こう側	Nakagawa Ryutaro	Japan
Golem in Pompei		Amos Gitai	France
Heads or Tails?	Testa o croce?	Alessio Rigo de Righi, Matteo Zoppis	Italy, United States
Hen	Kota	György Pálfi	Greece, Germany, Hungary
Maria Vitória		Mário Patrocínio	Portugal
Morte Cucina	ครัวสาว	Pen-ek Ratanaruang	Thailand
Mother	Мајка	Teona Strugar Mitevska	Belgium, North Macedonia
Mother Bhumi	地母	Chong Keat Aun	Malaysia, Hong Kong, Italy, Saudi Arabia
Mothertongue	春树	Zhang Lü	China
Palestine 36	فلسطين ٣٦	Annemarie Jacir	Palestine, United Kingdom, France, Denmark
Sermon to the Void	Boşluğa xütbə	Hilal Baydarov	Azerbaijan, Mexico, Turkey
Take Off		Pengfei	China
We Are the Fruits of the Forest	Nous sommes les fruits de la forêt	Rithy Panh	Cambodia, France

=== Gala Selection ===
The following films were selected to be screened as part of the Gala Selection.

English Title	Original Title	Director(s)	Production Country
Blue Boy Trial		Iizuka Kasho	Japan
Bring Him Down to a Portable Size	兄を持ち運べるサイズに	Nakano Ryota	Japan / France / China
Can't Cry With Your Face	君の顔では泣けない	Sakashita Yuichiro	Japan
Eddington		Ari Aster	United States
Holy Night: Demon Hunters	거룩한 밤: 데몬 헌터스	Lim Dae-hee	South Korea
Love on Trial	恋愛裁判	Koji Fukada	Japan
Night Flower	ナイトフラワー	Uchida Eiji	Japan
One Last Throw	栄光のバックホーム	Akiyama Jun	Japan
Rental Family		Hikari	United States, Japan
She's Got No Name	酱园弄·悬案	Peter Chan	China
Sirāt		Oliver Laxe	France, Spain
Sons of the Neon Night	風林火山	Juno Mak	China, Hong Kong
Springsteen: Deliver Me from Nowhere		Scott Cooper	United States

=== World Focus ===
The following films were selected for the World Focus section, which focuses on international films.

English Title	Original Title	Director(s)	Production Country
Girls on Wire	想飞的女孩	Vivian Qu	China
Kiss of the Spider Woman		Bill Condon	United States
Kopitiam Days		Yeo Siew Hua, Shoki Lin, M. Rihan Halim, Tan Siyou, Don Aravind, Ong Kuo Sin	Singapore
The Lake	Le Lac	Fabrice Aragno	Switzerland
Magellan	Magalhães	Lav Diaz	Portugal, Spain, France, Philippines, Taiwan
Mare's Nest		Ben Rivers	United Kingdom, France, Canada
The Mastermind		Kelly Reichardt	United States, United Kingdom
Tunnels: Sun In The Dark	Địa đạo: Mặt trời trong bóng tối	Bui Thac Chuyen	Vietnam
The Captive	El cautivo	Alejandro Amenábar	Spain, Italy
Dreams		Michel Franco	Mexico, United States
Matador		Pedro Almodóvar	Spain
The Wave	La ola	Sebastián Lelio	Chile
April	丟包阿公到我家	Freddy Tang	Taiwan
Crown Shyness	樹冠羞避	Chang Chun-yu	Taiwan
Double Happiness	雙囍	Joseph Chen-chieh Hsu	Taiwan
The Waves Will Carry Us	人生海海	Lau Kek-huat	Taiwan
Kika		Alexe Poukine	Belgium, France
Vitrival – The Most Beautiful Village in the World	Vitrival	Noëlle Bastin, Baptiste Bogaert	Belgium
Black God, White Devil	Deus e o Diabo na Terra do Sol	Glauber Rocha	Brazil
The Dragon of Wickedness Against the Holy Warrior	O Dragão da Maldade contra o Santo Guerreiro	Glauber Rocha	Brazil
Central Station	Central do Brasil	Walter Salles	Brazil
White House	Kasa Branca	Luciano Vidigal	Brazil
The Blue Trail	O Último Azul	Gabriel Mascaro	Brazil, Mexico, Netherlands, Chile
Milton Bituca Nascimento		Flávia Moraes	Brazil

=== Asian Future ===
The following films were selected to compete in the Asian Future section, which features films from Asian directors who have directed a maximum of three feature films.

English Title	Original Title	Director(s)	Production Country
Journey into Sato Tadao		Terasaki Mizuho	Japan
The Chatterboxes		Kawai Ken	Japan
Far in the Middle of the East	Door Dar Mianeh Shargh	Arash Aneessee	Iran, Austria
The Greatest Funeral Hits	En Güzel Cenaze Şarkıları	Ziya Demirel	Turkey
Halo	헤일로	Roh Young-wan	South Korea
Kiiroiko	きいろいこ	Imai Mika	Japan
Linka Linka	林卡林卡	Kangdrun	China
Noah’s Daughter	دختر نوح	Amirreza Jalalian	Iran
Number 23	第二十三号	Xia Hao	China
The Old Man and His Car		Michael Kam	Singapore
Tomorrow’s Min-Jae	내일의 민재	Park Young-jae	South Korea

=== Nippon Cinema Now ===
English Title	Original Title	Director(s)	Production Country
Saikai Paradise	西海楽園	Tsuruoka Keiko	Japan
White Flowers and Fruits	白の花実	Sakamoto Yukari	Japan
In Their Traces	魂のきせき	Kobayashi Shigeru	Japan
Echoes of the Orient		Yang Liping	Japan
All Greens	万事快調〈オール・グリーンズ〉	Koyama Takashi	Japan
Poca Pon	ポカポン	Ohtsuka Shin-ichi	Japan
TimeLimit		Elizabeth Miyaji	Japan
Lost Land	Harà Watan	Akio Fujimoto	Japan, France, Malaysia, Germany
Special screening
Dear Stranger	ディア・ストレンジャー	Tetsuya Mariko	Japan, Taiwan, United States

=== Women’s Empowerment ===
English Title	Original Title	Director(s)	Production Country
100 Sunset		Kunsang Kyirong	Canada
About Me		Nomoto Kozue	Japan
Cinema Jazireh	Kino Džazíra	Gözde Kural	Turkey, Bulgaria, Romania
Happy Birthday	هابي بيرث داي	Sarah Goher	Egypt
I Am Nevenka	Soy Nevenka	Icíar Bollaín	Spain, Italy
Sato and Sato	佐藤さんと佐藤さん	Chihiro Amano	Japan
Someone Like Me	像我這樣的愛情	Tam Wai-ching	Hong Kong

=== Animation ===
The following films were selected for the Animation section.

English Title	Original Title	Director(s)	Production Country
Allah Is Not Obliged	Allah n'est pas obligé	Zaven Najjar	France
Angel's Egg 4K Restoration	天使のたまご 4Kリマスター	Mamoru Oshii	Japan
ChaO	チァオ	Yasuhiro Aoki	Japan
Decorado		Alberto Vázquez	Spain, Portugal
I Am Frankelda	Soy Frankelda	Arturo and Roy Ambriz	Mexico
The Last Blossom	ホウセンカ	Baku Kinoshita	Japan

=== Japanese Classics ===
The following films were selected for the Japanese Classics section.

Year	English Title	Original Title	Director(s)	Production Country
1998	April Story	四月物語	Shunji Iwai	Japan
1958	Conflagration	炎上	Kon Ichikawa	Japan
1985	Mishima: A Life in Four Chapters		Paul Schrader	United States, Japan
1996	Shall We Dance?	Shall we ダンス?	Masayuki Suo	Japan
1996	Swallowtail Butterfly	スワロウテイル?	Shunji Iwai	Japan

=== Youth ===
The following films were selected for the Youth section.

English Title	Original Title	Director(s)	Production Country
Mad Bills to Pay (or Destiny, dile que no soy malo)		Joel Alfonso Vargas	United States
The Stranger	L'Étranger	François Ozon	France
TIFF 2025: Teens Meet Cinema - World Premiere Screening Event + TIFF Teens Cine Club 2025 Presentation	TIFFティーンズ映画教室2025上映会 + TIFFティーンズ・シネクラブ2025報告会	Panelists:Ikematsu Sosuke (Actor / Member of Cine Club), Dohi Etsuko (Children Meet Cinema)	Japan
TIFF International Symposium on Film Education: Challenges for Film Education Networks and Practitioners	TIFF映画教育国際シンポジウム2025～映画教育のネットワークと担い手の課題～	Panelists: Veerle Snijders (Eye Filmmuseum), Iwasaki Yuko / Suwa Nobuhiro / Dohi Etsuko	Japan

=== TIFF Series ===
The following television series were selected for the TIFF Series section.

English Title	Original Title	Director(s)	Production Country
Scandal Eve	スキャンダルイブ	Kanai Kou	Japan

== Awards ==
The awards were announced on November 5 in the closing ceremony:

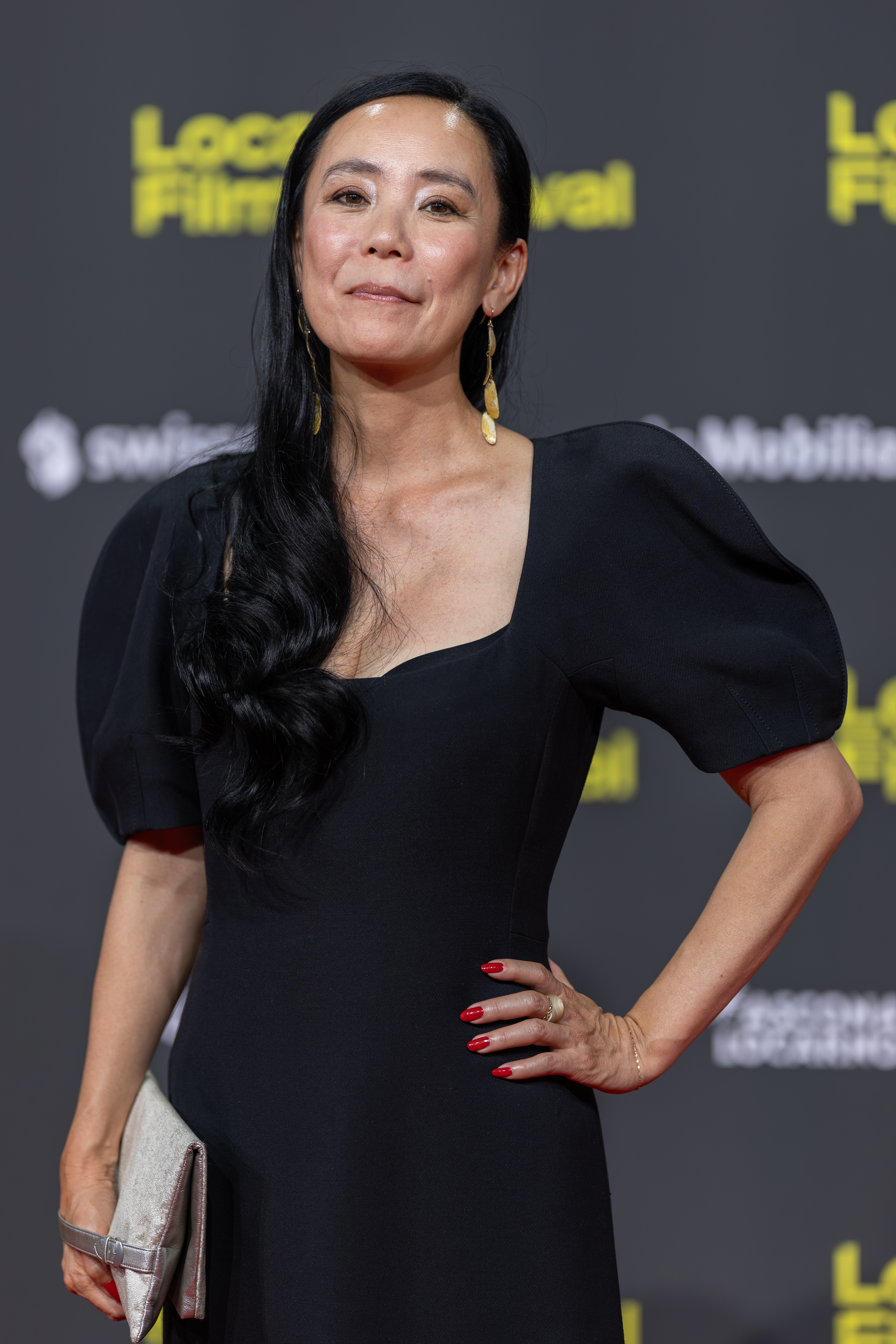
Naomi Kawase Best Actress Award winner

- Tokyo Grand Prix, (The Governor of Tokyo Award): Palestine 36 by Annemarie Jacir, Palestine, United Kingdom, France, Denmark
- Special Jury Prize: We Are the Fruits of the Forest by Rithy Panh
- Award for Best Director:
  - Zhang Lü for Mothertongue
  - Alessio Rigo de Righi, Matteo Zoppis for Heads or Tails?
- Award for Best Actor: Wang Chuanjun for Mothertongue
- Award for Best Actress: Momoko Fukuchi and Naomi Kawase for Echoes of Motherhood
- Award for Best Artistic Contribution: Mother by Teona Strugar Mitevska, Belgium, North Macedonia
- The Audience Award: Blonde by Sakashita Yuichiro, Japan
- Asian Future Best Film Award: Halo by Roh Young-wan, South Korea
- TIFF Ethical Film Award: White House by Luciano Vidigal, Brazil
- Asian Students’ Grand Prix Award: Floating by Lee Ji-yun, South Korea
- Kurosawa Akira Award:
  - Lee Sang-il, Japanese film director and screenwriter
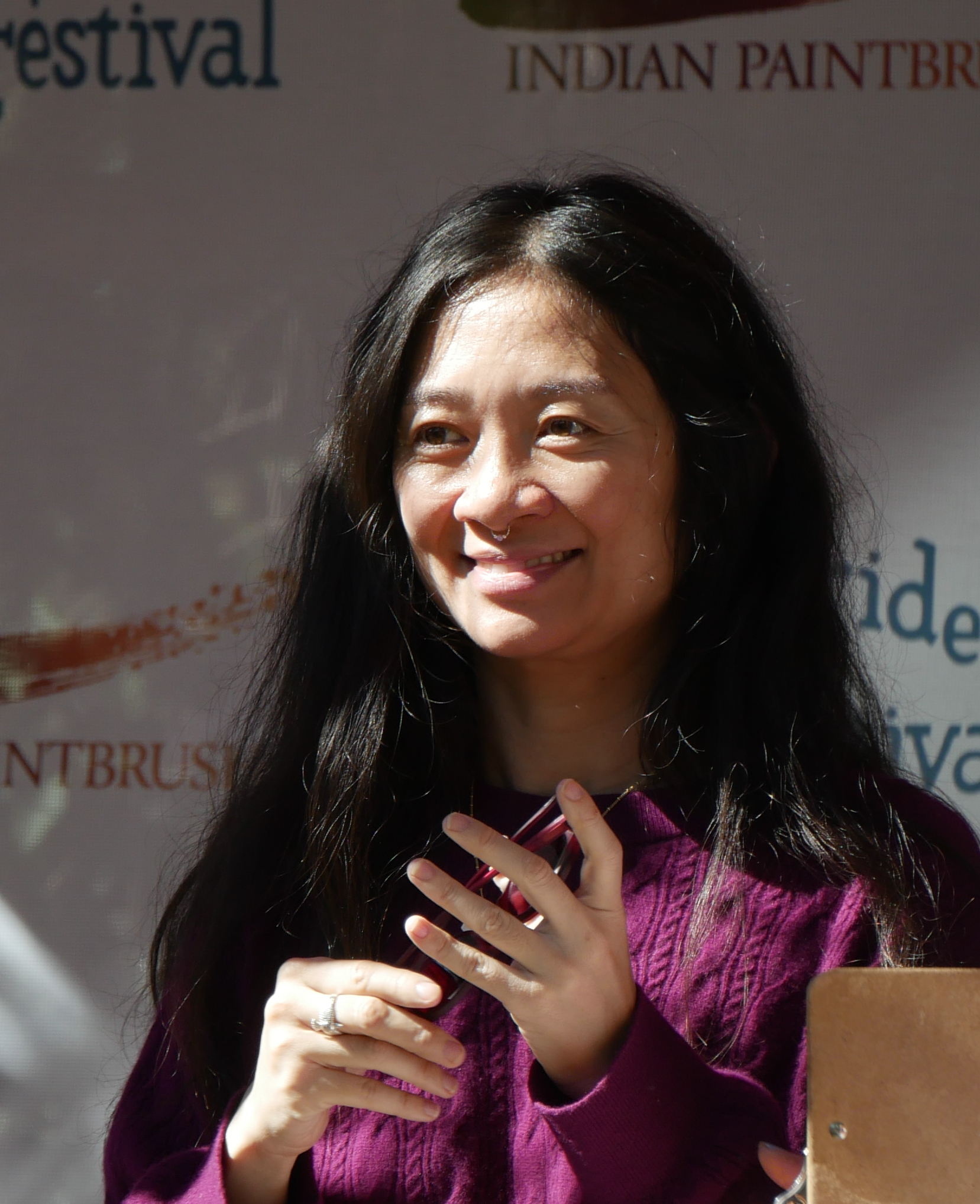
    Chloé Zhao, Kurosawa Akira Award recipient
  - Chloé Zhao, Chinese-born filmmaker
- Lifetime Achievement Award:
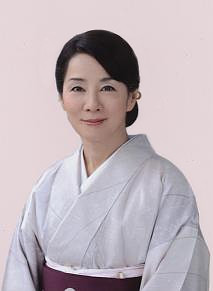
  Sayuri Yoshinaga, Lifetime Achievement Award honree
  - Sayuri Yoshinaga, Japanese actress and activist
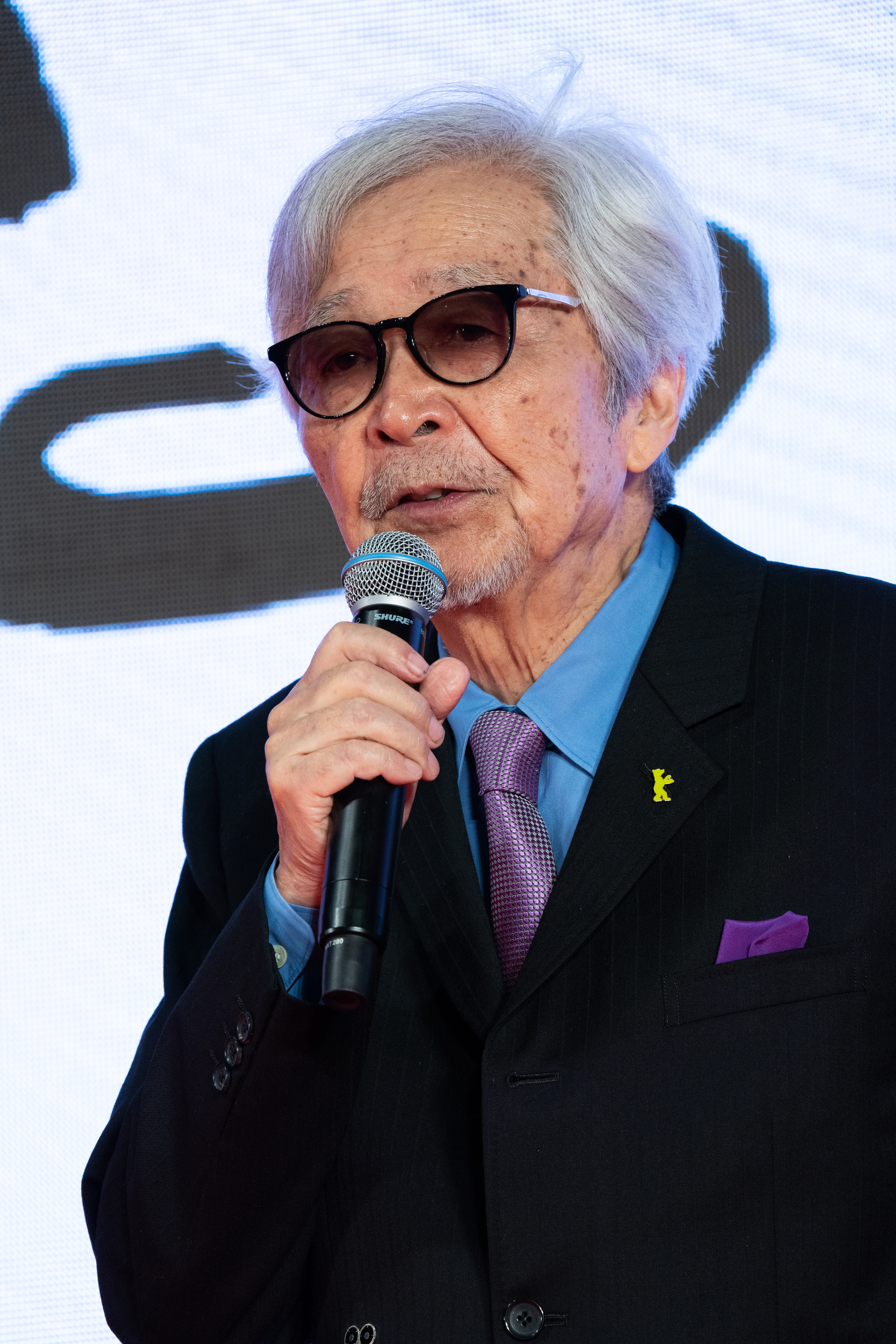
    Yoji Yamada, Lifetime Achievement Award recipient
  - Yoji Yamada, Japanese film director
