= Morte Cucina =

2025 Thai thriller drama film

- Promotional poster
- Thai: ครัวสาว
- Literally: Girl's Kitchen
- Directed by: Pen-ek Ratanaruang
- Screenplay by: Pen-ek Ratanaruang
- Produced by: Soros Sukhum; Conor Zorn
- Starring: Bella Boonsang; Krit Sripoomseth; Nopachai Chaiyanam; Tadanobu Asano
- Cinematography: Christopher Doyle
- Edited by: M.L. Pattamanadda Yukol
- Music by: Vichaya Vatanasapt
- Production company: 185 Films
- Distributed by: Goodfellas
- Release date: September 23, 2025 (Zinemaldia)
- Running time: 96 minutes
- Country: Thailand
- Language: Thai

Morte Cucina (Thai: ครัวสาว), is a 2025 Thai thriller drama film written and directed by Pen-ek Ratanaruang. The film follows Sao, a highly skilled cook scarred by a tragic past, now works as a waitress at a Bangkok restaurant.

It had its premiere on 23 September 2025 as the opening film of Culinary Zinema section of the 73rd San Sebastián International Film Festival. It had its Asian Premiere at the 38th Tokyo International Film Festival on 28 October 2025 in International competition vying for Tokyo Grand Prix.

== Synopsis ==
Sao, a talented cook working as a waitress in Bangkok, lives a quiet life despite a painful history. Her world changes when she unexpectedly meets the man responsible for her past trauma. Determined to confront him, Sao uses her culinary skills to carefully plan and carry out her revenge.

== Cast ==
- Bella Boonsang
- Krit Sripoomseth
- Nopachai Chaiyanam
- Tadanobu Asano
- Wendy Zuho as Vivienne

== Release ==
Morte Cucina had its premiere at the 73rd San Sebastián International Film Festival on 23 September 2025 in Culinary Zinema.

The film had its Asian Premiere at the 38th Tokyo International Film Festival on 28 October 2025 in International competition.

== Accolades ==
| Award | Date of ceremony | Category | Recipient | Result | Ref. |
|---|---|---|---|---|---|
| Tokyo International Film Festival | November 5, 2025 | Tokyo Grand Prix | Morte Cucina | Nominated | |
