= Golem in Pompei =

2025 documentary film by Amos Gitai

- Promotional poster
- Directed by: Amos Gitai
- Written by: Isaac Bashevis Singer
- Screenplay by: Amos Gitai; Marie-José Sanselme
- Story by: Virginia Woolf
- Produced by: Jill Masson; Steve Handel; Benedetto Habib
- Starring: Irène Jacob; Laurent Naouri; Minas Qarawany; Misha Lescaut
- Cinematography: Dan Bronfeld
- Edited by: Yuval Orr
- Music by: Aleksey Kochetkov; Kiumars Mousajevi
- Production company: AGAV Films
- Release dates: 28 October 2025 (Tokyo); 2 June 2026 (France)
- Running time: 107 minutes
- Country: France
- Languages: French; Yiddish; Arabic; Hebrew; Spanish; English; Russian; German; Japanese

Golem in Pompei is a French documentary film directed by Amos Gitai. It is a film version of the play Golem, which was performed among the ancient ruins of Pompeii in June 2025. The documentary combines dramatic scenes with fictional elements to highlight connections between history and modern life. The cast includes Irène Jacob, Micha Lescaut, Minas Milad Qarawany and Bahira Abrassi, each of whom has a previous connection to Amos Gitai's work.

The film had its World Premiere at the 38th Tokyo International Film Festival on 28 October 2025 in International competition vying for Tokyo Grand Prix.

== Content ==
The documentary presents a filmed version of the stage play Golem, directed by Amos Gitai and first performed at the Pompeii Theater Festival in Italy in June 2025.

Set in medieval Europe, the play explores the legend of the Golem, a figure from Kabbalists tradition made from clay and brought to life. The production draws particular inspiration from The Golem, a children's book by Nobel Prize-winning author Isaac Bashevis Singer. The opening scene includes a quote from Virginia Woolf’s World War II-era essay, Thoughts on Peace under an Air Raid.

== Cast ==
- Irène Jacob
- Laurent Naouri
- Minas Qarawany
- Misha Lescaut

== Release ==
Golem in Pompei had its world premiere at the 38th Tokyo International Film Festival on 28 October 2025 in International competition.

The film was released for DVD in France on 2 June 2026.

== Accolades ==
Award	Date of ceremony	Category	Recipient	Result	Ref.
Tokyo International Film Festival	November 5, 2025	Tokyo Grand Prix	Golem in Pompei	Nominated	
