= Maria Vitória (film) =

2025 Portuguese drama film

- Promotional poster
- Portuguese: Maria Vitória
- Written by: Mário Patrocínio
- Produced by: Ana Pinhão Moura
- Starring: Mariana Cardoso; Miguel Borges; Miguel Nunes; Ana Cristina Oliveira
- Cinematography: Pedro J. Márquez
- Edited by: Cláudia Silvestre
- Music by: Edgar Valente; Bernardo D’Addario
- Production companies: APM - Actions Per Minute; Belino Production
- Distributed by: BRO Cinema
- Release dates: 1 November 2025 (Tokyo); 5 March 2026 (Portugal)
- Running time: 113 minutes
- Country: Portugal
- Language: Portuguese

Maria Vitória is a 2025 Portuguese drama film written and directed by Mário Patrocínio in his feature directorial debut. Starring Mariana Cardoso in titular role, the film follows Maria Vitória, who lives in a remote village in the Portuguese mountains and plays football in the local boys' youth team.

The film had its World Premiere at the 38th Tokyo International Film Festival on 1 November 2025 in International competition vying for Tokyo Grand Prix. It was released theatrically on 5 March 2026 in Portugal.

== Synopsis ==
Maria trains tirelessly with her father Nacho and plays on the local boys' team, hoping to go pro. Her routine is disrupted when her older brother Bruno returns after years away, reopening wounds from a fire that killed their mother. As Maria prepares for a crucial match, she begins to challenge her father's control and reflect on her own goals. The film explores her journey toward independence and self-discovery, set against the backdrop of grief and rural isolation.

== Cast ==
Main

- Mariana Cardoso as Maria Vitória
- Miguel Borges
- Miguel Nunes as Bruno
- Ana Cristina de Oliveira
- Bárbara Albuquerque

Supporting

- Adriano Carvalho
- Ana Cristina Oliveira
- António Durães
- Bárbara Albuquerque
- Benedito José
- Isabel Simões
- Joana Ribeiro
- João Amaral
- João Vicente
- Marcello Urgeghe
- Marco Mendonça
- Miguel Amorim
- Rui Pedro Silva
- Adufeiras do Paul

== Production ==
Maria Vitória was filmed in the mountainous region of Serra da Estrela, Portugal. It marks the feature fiction debut of director Mário Patrocínio, who spent part of his childhood in Japan. His return to the country for the film's premiere at the 38th Tokyo International Film Festival represents a memorable personal and artistic milestone.

The film was produced by APM – Actions Per Minute in association with BRO Cinema. It received financial support from the ICA – Institute of Cinema and Audiovisual, PIC Portugal – Tourism and Cinema Support Fund, and RTP – Portuguese Radio and Television. Additional institutional support was provided by the Municipal Council of Manteigas, the Municipal Council of Covilhã, and Belmonte City Hall.

== Release ==
Maria Vitória had its world premiere at the 38th Tokyo International Film Festival on 1 November 2025 in International competition.

Subsequently, on 16 November 2025, it was screened in the Out of Competition section of the Lisbon & Estoril Film Festival.

It was also presented at the Arizona International Film Festival on 19 April 2026.

The film was short listed for Portuguese submission for the 99th Academy Awards for Best International Feature Film.

== Accolades ==
Award	Date of ceremony	Category	Recipient	Result	Ref.
Tokyo International Film Festival	November 5, 2025	Tokyo Grand Prix	Maria Vitória	Nominated	
Arizona International Film Festival	25 April 2026	Best Foreign Feature	Maria Vitória	Won	
