= Echoes of Motherhood =

2025 Japanese drama film

- Promotional poster
- Japanese: 恒星の向こう側
- Literally: Beyond the Stars
- Directed by: Nakagawa Ryutaro
- Screenplay by: Nakagawa Ryutaro
- Produced by: Momo Inaba
- Starring: Momoko Fukuchi; Naomi Kawase; Kanichiro; Aki Asakura
- Cinematography: Ueno Senzo
- Edited by: Nakagawa Ryutaro
- Music by: Haruka Nakamura
- Production companies: Production I.G; Nakachika Pictures
- Release dates: October 29, 2025 (Tokyo); October 30, 2026 (Theaters)
- Running time: 91 minutes
- Country: Japan
- Language: Japanese

Echoes of Motherhood (恒星の向こう側) is a Japanese drama film written and directed by Nakagawa Ryutaro. It is his concluding film in a trilogy by the exploring themes of loss and renewal, following 2016 film Run, Faster Than Despair and 2018 film April's Long Dream. Starting Momoko Fukuchi, Naomi Kawase, Kanichiro and Aki Asakura, the film depicts the love and conflict between mother and daughter, and husband and wife.

The film had its World Premiere at the 38th Tokyo International Film Festival on October 29, 2025 in International competition vying for Tokyo Grand Prix.

== Synopsis ==
Echoes of Motherhood explores the complexities of familial and romantic relationships, portraying how love can evolve through conflict, grief, and reconciliation.

The story centers on Michi, who returns to her family home after learning her mother Kanako has limited time left. Their meeting was strained, as Kanako's attempts to reconnect are met with emotional distance. Michi's husband, Toshizo, struggles with lingering feelings for his late friend Mari, despite having a child with Michi. As Michi listens to old recordings left by her mother, she uncovers a hidden chapter of Kanako's past. This discovery helps Michi understand her mother's choices and embrace the idea of love passed down through generations.

== Cast ==
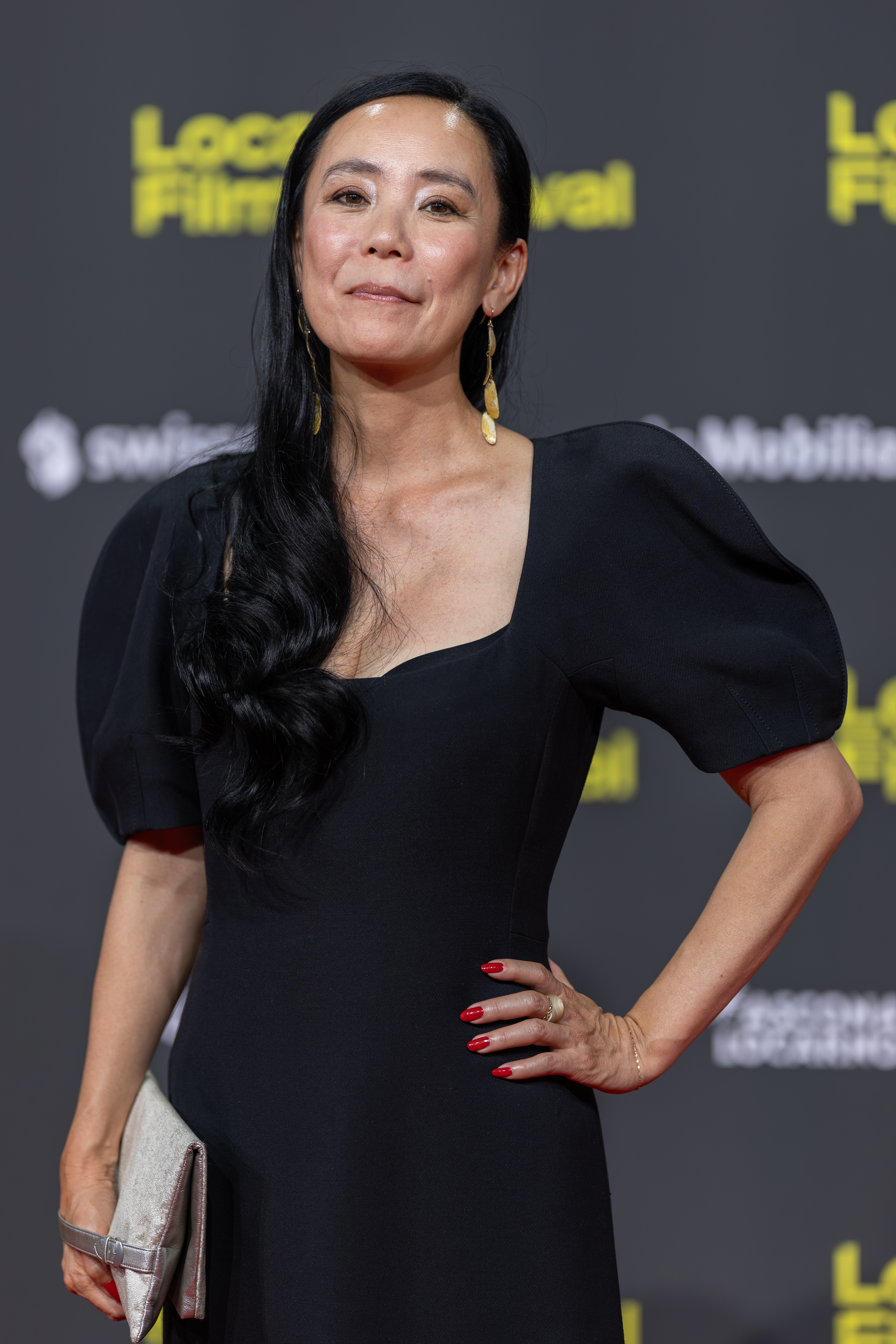
Naomi Kawase protagonist of the film

- Momoko Fukuchi as Michi
- Naomi Kawase as Kanako
- Kanichiro as Toshizo
- Aki Asakura
- Sara Minami
- Takahiro Miura
- Shiori Kubo
- Sachiyo Nakao

== Production ==
Notsuke Peninsula in Hokkaido

The film was shot in the Notsuke Peninsula in Betsukai and Hokkaido.

== Release ==
Echoes of Motherhood had its world premiere at the 38th Tokyo International Film Festival on October 29, 2025 in International competition.

It will be released in theatres on October 30, 2026.

== Accolades ==
| Award | Date of ceremony | Category | Recipient | Result | Ref. |
|---|---|---|---|---|---|
| Tokyo International Film Festival | November 5, 2025 | Tokyo Grand Prix | Echoes of Motherhood | Nominated | |
| Tokyo International Film Festival | November 5, 2025 | Best Actress | Momoko Fukuchi and Naomi Kawase | Won | |
