= Blonde (2025 film) =

2025 Japanese drama film

- Promotional poster
- Japanese: 金髪
- Directed by: Sakashita Yuichiro
- Written by: Sakashita Yuichiro
- Produced by: Yusuke Wakabayashi; Kazumi Fukase
- Starring: Takanori Iwata; Tamaki Shiratori; Mugi Kadowaki
- Cinematography: Yuta Tsukinaga
- Edited by: Ryuichi Takita
- Music by: Yuko Sebu
- Production company: The Klockworx
- Distributed by: The Klockworx
- Release date: October 28, 2025 (Tokyo)
- Running time: 103 minutes
- Country: Japan
- Language: Japanese

Blonde (金髪, Kinpatsu/Kimpatsu) is a 2025 Japanese drama film written and directed by Sakashita Yuichiro. Starting Takanori Iwata, Tamaki Shiratori and Mugi Kadowaki, the film follows junior high school teacher Ichikawa, who tries to act like he knows everything, ignores problems, and pretends to be a grown-up, believing that would make life easier.

The film had its World Premiere at the 38th Tokyo International Film Festival on October 28, 2025 in International competition, where it won The Audience Award.

== Synopsis ==
Blonde is centered on Ichikawa, a 30-year-old junior high school teacher struggling with maturity. His life takes a sudden turn when dozens of students in his class dye their hair blonde in protest against strict school rules—a movement led by student Ita Midori. At the same time, Ichikawa’s girlfriend, Akasaka, confronts him about marriage, questioning his childish behavior. As the "Golden Hair Demo" draws national attention, Ichikawa joins forces with Midori to navigate the chaos and find a way forward.

== Cast ==
- Takanori Iwata as Ichikawa
- Tamaki Shiratori as Ita Madori
- Mugi Kadowaki as Akasaka
- Maho Yamada as Nakamoto
- Kentaro Tamura as Komai
- Chika Uchida as Nishihara

== Release ==
Blonde had its world premiere at the 38th Tokyo International Film Festival on October 28, 2025 in International competition.

The film is scheduled for release on November 21, 2025 in Japanese theatres by The Klockworx.

== Accolades ==
Award	Date of ceremony	Category	Recipient	Result	Ref.
Tokyo International Film Festival	November 5, 2025	Tokyo Grand Prix	Blonde	Nominated	
Tokyo International Film Festival	November 5, 2025	The Audience Award	Blonde	Won	
Mainichi Film Awards	February 10, 2026	Best Music	Hiroko Sebu	Pending	
