= Climbing for Life =

2025 Japanese biographical film

- Theatrical release poster
- Japanese: てっぺんの向こうにあなたがいる
- Literally: You are there, beyond the top
- Directed by: Junji Sakamoto
- Screenplay by: Riko Sakaguchi
- Based on: Life With its Ups and Downs by Junko Tabei
- Produced by: Rioko Tominaga
- Starring: Sayuri Yoshinaga; Rena Nōnen; Ryuya Wakaba; Asuka Kudo
- Cinematography: Norimichi Kasamatsu
- Edited by: Shinichi Fushima
- Music by: Goro Yasukawa
- Production company: Kino Films
- Distributed by: Kino Films
- Release dates: September 19, 2025 (Zinemaldia); October 31, 2025 (Japan)
- Running time: 123 minutes
- Country: Japan
- Language: Japanese

Climbing for Life (Japanese: てっぺんの向こうにあなたがいる) is a 2025 Japanese biographical film directed by Junji Sakamoto about the life of Junko Tabei. Starring Sayuri Yoshinaga as Tabei, it chronicles her historic 1975 ascent of Mount Everest, making her the first woman to do so, and follows her life as a pioneering mountaineer. It is based on her essay Life, With its Ups and Downs.

It had its premiere on September 19, 2025, in the Special Screening section of the 73rd San Sebastián International Film Festival.

The film opened the 38th Tokyo International Film Festival on October 27, 2025, to commemorate the 50th anniversary of her Everest achievement.

== Cast ==
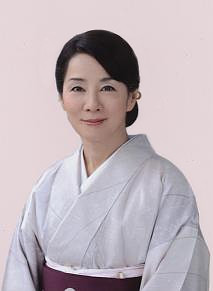
Sayuri Yoshinaga

- Sayuri Yoshinaga as Junko Tabe, based on Junko Tabei
  - Rena Nōnen as young Junko Tabe
- Ryuya Wakaba as Shintaro Tabe
- Kōichi Satō as Masaaki Tabe
  - Asuka Kudo as young Masaaki Tabe
- Fumino Kimura as Norie Tabe
- Wan Marui as Hiroe Iwata
- Wako Ando as Risako Shimizu
- Chisato Nakai as Kaoruko Maruyama
- Misa Wada as Ryoko Arai
- Yūki Amami as Etsuko Kitayama
  - Mizuki Kayashima as young Etsuko

== Production ==
Principal photography commenced on August 18, 2024, in diverse locations across Japan—including all six Kanto prefectures, along with Nagano, Yamanashi, Fukushima, and Toyama. It was shot in snow-covered mountain regions, amid blizzard conditions. It was wrapped up in November 2024.

== Release ==
Climbing for Life had its premiere at the 73rd San Sebastián International Film Festival on 19 September 2025. It will also be presented in Spotlight on Japan section of the Hawaiʻi International Film Festival on October 17, 2025.

The film opened the 38th Tokyo International Film Festival on October 27, 2025, and Asian Film Festival Barcelona, on October 29, 2025.

On October 29, it was screened at the Hong Kong Asian Film Festival in Cineaste Delights section.

The film is scheduled for release on October 31, 2025 in Japanese theatres by Kino Films.
