= Junko Tabei =

Japanese mountain climber (1939–2016)

- 田部井 淳子
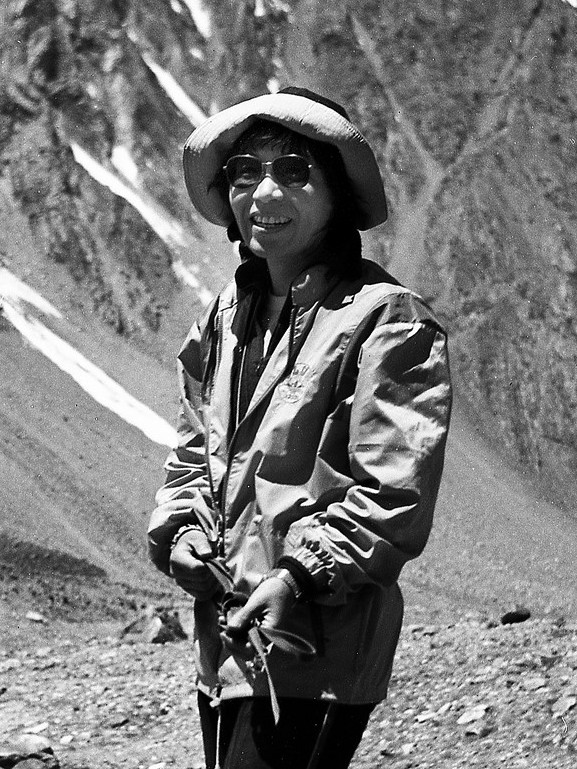
- Tabei in 1985 at Ismoil Somoni Peak (then called Communism Peak, the highest point in the Soviet Union)
- Born: Junko Ishibashi; 22 September 1939; Miharu, Fukushima, Japan
- Died: 20 October 2016 (aged 77); Kawagoe, Saitama, Japan
- Occupations: Mountaineer; author; teacher
- Known for: First woman to summit Mount Everest (1975); first woman to ascend the Seven Summits (1992)
- Spouse: Masanobu Tabei
- Children: 2

Junko Tabei (Japanese: 田部井 淳子, Hepburn: Tabei Junko; née Ishibashi; 22 September 1939 – 20 October 2016) was a Japanese mountaineer, author and teacher. She was the first woman to reach the summit of Mount Everest and ascend the Seven Summits, climbing the highest peak on every continent.

Tabei wrote seven books, organized environmental projects to clean up trash left behind by climbers on Everest, and led annual climbs up Mount Fuji for youth affected by the Great East Japan Earthquake.

An astronomer named asteroid 6897 Tabei after her and in 2019, a mountain range on Pluto was named Tabei Montes in her honor.

== Early life ==
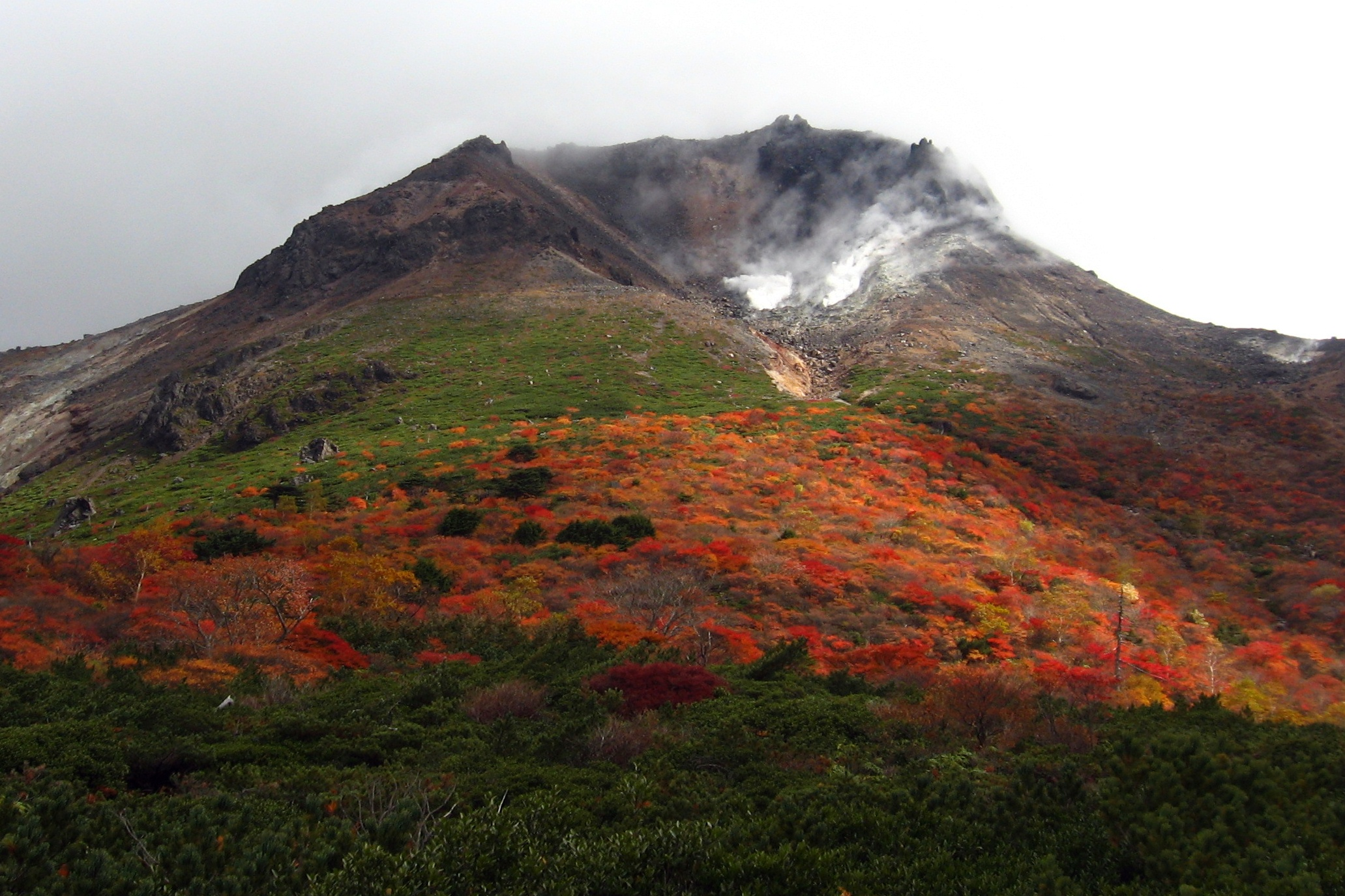
The volcanic Chausu Peak of Mount Nasu

Junko Ishibashi was born on 22 September 1939 in Miharu, Fukushima, the fifth daughter of seven children. Her father was a printer. She was considered a frail child, but nevertheless she began mountain climbing at the age of ten, going on a class climbing trip to Mount Nasu. She enjoyed the non-competitive nature of the sport and the striking natural landscapes that came into view upon reaching the top of the mountain. Although she was interested in doing more climbing, her family did not have enough money for such an expensive hobby, and Ishibashi made only a few climbs during her high school years.

From 1958 to 1962, Ishibashi studied English and American literature at Showa Women's University. She initially planned on a career as a teacher. After graduation, she returned to her earlier passion for climbing by joining a number of men's climbing clubs. While some men welcomed her as a fellow climber, others questioned her motives for pursuing a typically male-dominated sport. Soon, Ishibashi had climbed all the major mountains in Japan, including Mount Fuji.

When she was 27, Ishibashi married Masanobu Tabei, a mountaineer she had met during a climbing excursion on Mount Tanigawa. The couple eventually had two children: a daughter, Noriko, and a son, Shinya.

== Career ==
=== Early climbing expeditions ===
In 1969, Junko Tabei established the Joshi-Tohan Club (Women's Mountaineering Club) for women only. The club's slogan was "Let's go on an overseas expedition by ourselves", and the group was the first of its kind in Japan. Tabei later stated that she founded the club as a result of how she was treated by male mountaineers of the time; some men, for example, refused to climb with her, while others thought she was only interested in climbing as a way to find a husband. Tabei helped fund her climbing activities by working as an editor for the Journal of the Physical Society of Japan.

The Joshi-Tohan Club embarked on their first expedition in 1970, climbing the Nepalese mountain Annapurna III. They successfully reached the summit using a new route on the south side, achieving the first female and first Japanese ascent of the mountain. Tabei and one other member, Hiroko Hirakawa, were chosen to complete the final climb to the top, accompanied by two sherpa guides. The climbers had brought a camera, but the temperature was so cold that the camera's film cracked.

From her experience in the Annapurna III ascent, Tabei realized that she and the other Japanese women had sometimes struggled to reconcile traditional Japanese values of quiet strength with the more immediate practical needs of mountaineering. Many Joshi-Tohan Club members were initially reluctant to admit they did not know something or needed assistance, preferring to keep a stoic silence, but mountain climbing forced the women to acknowledge their personal limits and accept help from each other.

=== 1975 Everest expedition ===
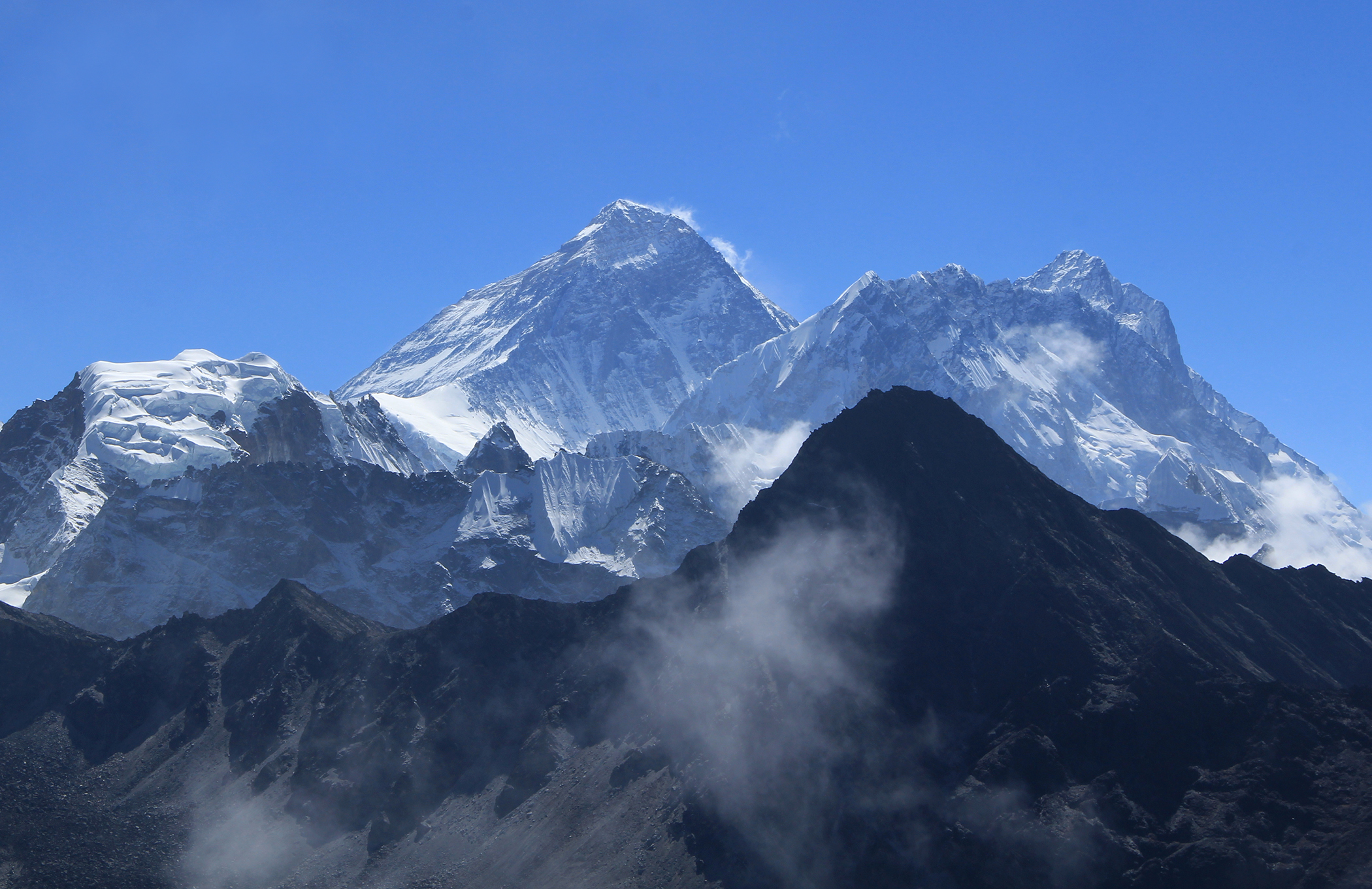
Mount Everest

After Tabei and Hirakawa successfully summited Annapurna III on 19 May 1970, the Joshi-Tohan Club decided to tackle Mount Everest. The club created a team known as the Japanese Women's Everest Expedition (JWEE), led by Eiko Hisano, which would attempt to summit Mount Everest. JWEE contained 15 members, most of them working women who came from a range of professions. Two of the women, including Tabei, were mothers. They applied for a climbing permit for Everest in 1971, but had to wait four years to receive a place in the formal climbing schedule.

Tabei helped to find sponsors for the expedition, although she was frequently told that the women "should be raising children instead". She was able to obtain last-minute funding from the Yomiuri Shimbun newspaper and Nippon Television, but each group member still needed to pay 1.5 million yen (US$5,000). Tabei taught piano lessons to help raise the necessary funds. To save money, Tabei made much of her own equipment from scratch, creating waterproof gloves out of the cover of her car and sewing trousers from old curtains.

After a long training period, the team made the expedition in May 1975. The group attracted much media attention with their plans, and the 15 women were initially accompanied by journalists and a television camera crew as they began their climb. They used the same route to ascend the mountain that Sir Edmund Hillary and Tenzing Norgay had taken in 1953, and six sherpa guides assisted the team for the full span of the expedition. On 4 May, the team was camping at 6,300 metres (20,700 ft) when an avalanche struck their camp. Tabei and four of her fellow climbers were buried under the snow. Tabei lost consciousness until sherpa guides dug her out. Luckily, there were no casualties. Bruised and injured by the incident, Tabei could barely walk and was forced to spend two days recovering. As soon as she was able, however, she resumed the expedition and continued leading her team up the mountain.

Although the team had originally planned to send two women up to the peak of Everest (accompanied by a sherpa), a bout of altitude sickness meant that the team's sherpas could not carry the number of oxygen bottles required to accommodate two climbers. Only one woman could continue. After much discussion, Hisano nominated Tabei to complete the climb. Nearing the peak, Tabei was furious to discover that she would have to cross a thin, hazardous ridge of ice that had gone completely unmentioned in accounts by previous expeditions. She crawled along it sideways, later describing it as the most tense experience she had ever had. Twelve days after the avalanche, on 16 May 1975, with her sherpa guide Ang Tsering, Tabei became the first woman to reach the summit of Everest.

Tabei was showered with attention as a result of her achievement. In Kathmandu, a parade was held in her honor. On her return to Japan, she was received at the Tokyo airport by thousands of cheering supporters. She received messages from the King of Nepal and the Japanese government, a television miniseries was made about the Everest expedition, and Tabei made personal appearances across Japan. However, Tabei remained uncomfortable with this level of fame. She later told media that she preferred to be remembered as the 36th person to summit Everest: "I did not intend to be the first woman on Everest."

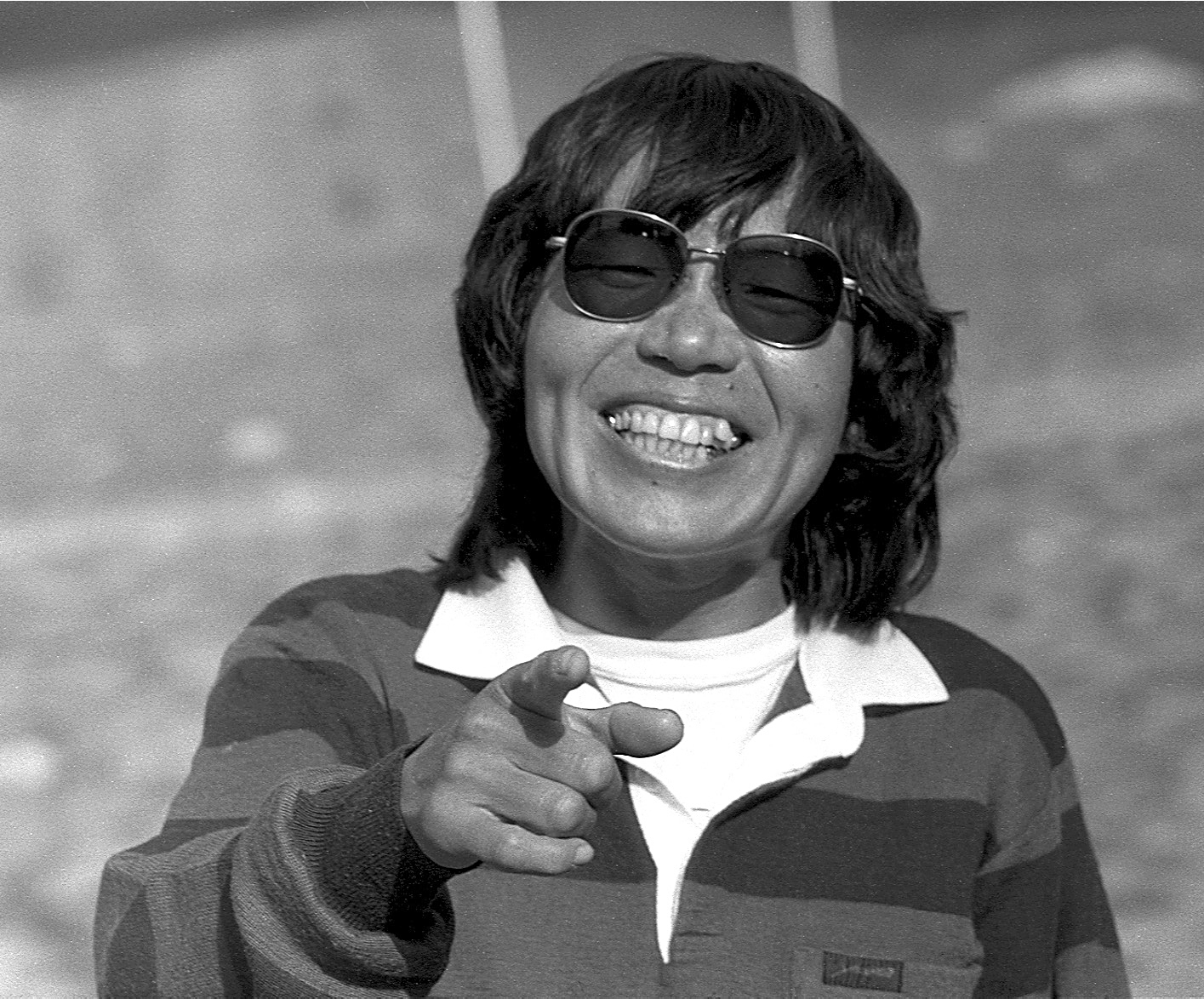
Junko Tabei, 1985 Photo by: Jaan Kynnap

=== Later activities ===
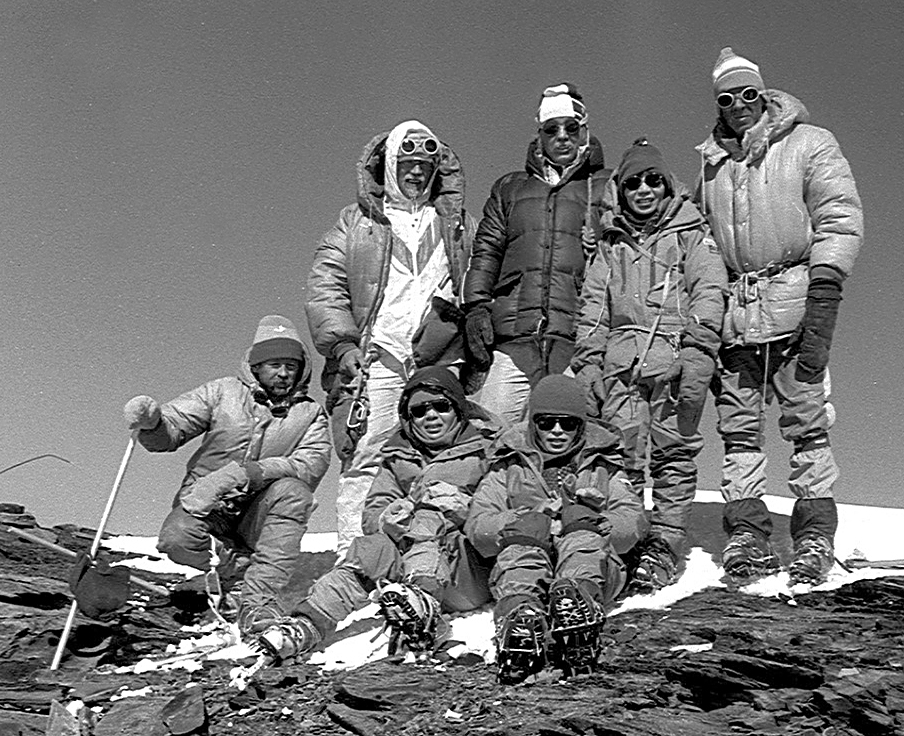
Junko Tabei on Communism Peak in 1985 together with two other Japanese and four Estonian mountaineers

Tabei continued her mountaineering pursuits, eventually climbing the highest mountain on each continent: Kilimanjaro (1980), Aconcagua (1987), Denali (1988), Elbrus (1989), Mount Vinson (1991), and Puncak Jaya (1992). Upon her successful climb of Puncak Jaya, she became the first woman to complete the Seven Summits. By 2005, Tabei had taken part in 44 all-female mountaineering expeditions around the world. She had a personal goal to climb the highest mountain in every country in the world, and by the end of her lifetime she had completed at least 70 of these mountains.

She never accepted corporate sponsorship after Mount Everest, preferring to remain financially independent. She saved money to fund her expeditions by making paid public appearances, guiding mountain-climbing tours, and tutoring local children in music and English. Tabei's friends and supporters sometimes donated food and equipment.

In addition to her climbing, Tabei worked on ecological concerns; in 2000, she completed postgraduate studies at Kyushu University focusing on the environmental degradation of Everest caused by the waste left behind by climbing groups. Tabei was also the director of the Himalayan Adventure Trust of Japan, an organization working at a global level to preserve mountain environments. One of the trust's projects was to build an incinerator to burn climbers' trash. She also led and participated in "clean-up" climbs in Japan and the Himalayas alongside her husband and children.

In May 2003, a celebration was held in Kathmandu to celebrate the 50th anniversary of the first successful summit of Mount Everest, and crowds of Nepalese people gathered to cheer a procession of past Everest climbers. Tabei and Sir Edmund Hillary were given a special place in the festivities for their respective achievements.

Between 1996 and 2008, Tabei wrote and published seven books. Following the Great East Japan Earthquake in 2011, Tabei began organizing annual guided excursions up Mount Fuji for schoolchildren affected by the disaster.

== Death and legacy ==
Tabei was diagnosed with stomach cancer in 2012, but continued with many of her mountaineering activities. In July 2016, despite her advancing illness, she led a youth expedition up Mount Fuji. She died in a hospital in Kawagoe on 20 October 2016.

Before Tabei's death, an astronomer had named asteroid 6897 Tabei after her.

On 22 September 2019, Google commemorated the 80th anniversary of her birth with a Doodle. The accompanying write-up gave her motivation slogan, "Do not give up. Keep on your quest."

On 19 November 2019, a mountain range on Pluto was named Tabei Montes in honor of Tabei's mountaineering accomplishments. The theme for naming mountains on Pluto is "Historic pioneers who crossed new horizons in the exploration of the Earth, sea and sky".

== In popular culture ==
In 2025, a film titled as Climbing for Life directed by Junji Sakamoto starring Sayuri Yoshinaga, chronicles her historic first ascent of Mount Everest as a woman in 1975 and her subsequent life challenges, marking the 50th anniversary of her achievement. The film opened the 38th Tokyo International Film Festival on October 27, 2025.

Tabei is the subject of the children's picture book Up, Up, Ever Up! Junko Tabei: A Life in the Mountains, which was written by Anita Yasuda and illustrated by Yuko Shimizu. It was included in Rise: A Feminist Book Project's Top Ten of 2026.

== See also ==
- List of 20th-century summiters of Mount Everest
- List of climbers and mountaineers
- List of female explorers and travelers
- List of Mount Everest records
- List of women's firsts
- Timeline of Mount Everest expeditions
