= We Are the Fruits of the Forest =

2025 documentary film by Rithy Panh

- Teaser poster
- French: Nous Sommes les Fruits de la Forêt
- Directed by: Rithy Panh
- Produced by: Catherine Dussart
- Starring: Pa Kreb; Mak Kreb; Yeay Kreb
- Cinematography: Rithy Panh; Mourng Vet; Cheng Socheat; Sok Chan Rado; Prum Mesa
- Edited by: Rithy Panh
- Music by: Marc Marder
- Production company: Catherine Dussart Production
- Release date: 30 October 2025 (Tokyo)
- Running time: 87 minutes
- Countries: Cambodia; France
- Language: Bunong

We Are the Fruits of the Forest (French: Nous Sommes les Fruits de la Forêt) is a 2025 Bunong-language documentary film directed by Cambodian-French filmmaker Rithy Panh, which follows the lives of ethnic minorities in Cambodia's mountainous regions over four years.

The film a Cambodia-France co-production, had its World Premiere at the 38th Tokyo International Film Festival on 30 October 2025 in International competition, where it won the Special Jury Prize.

== Content ==
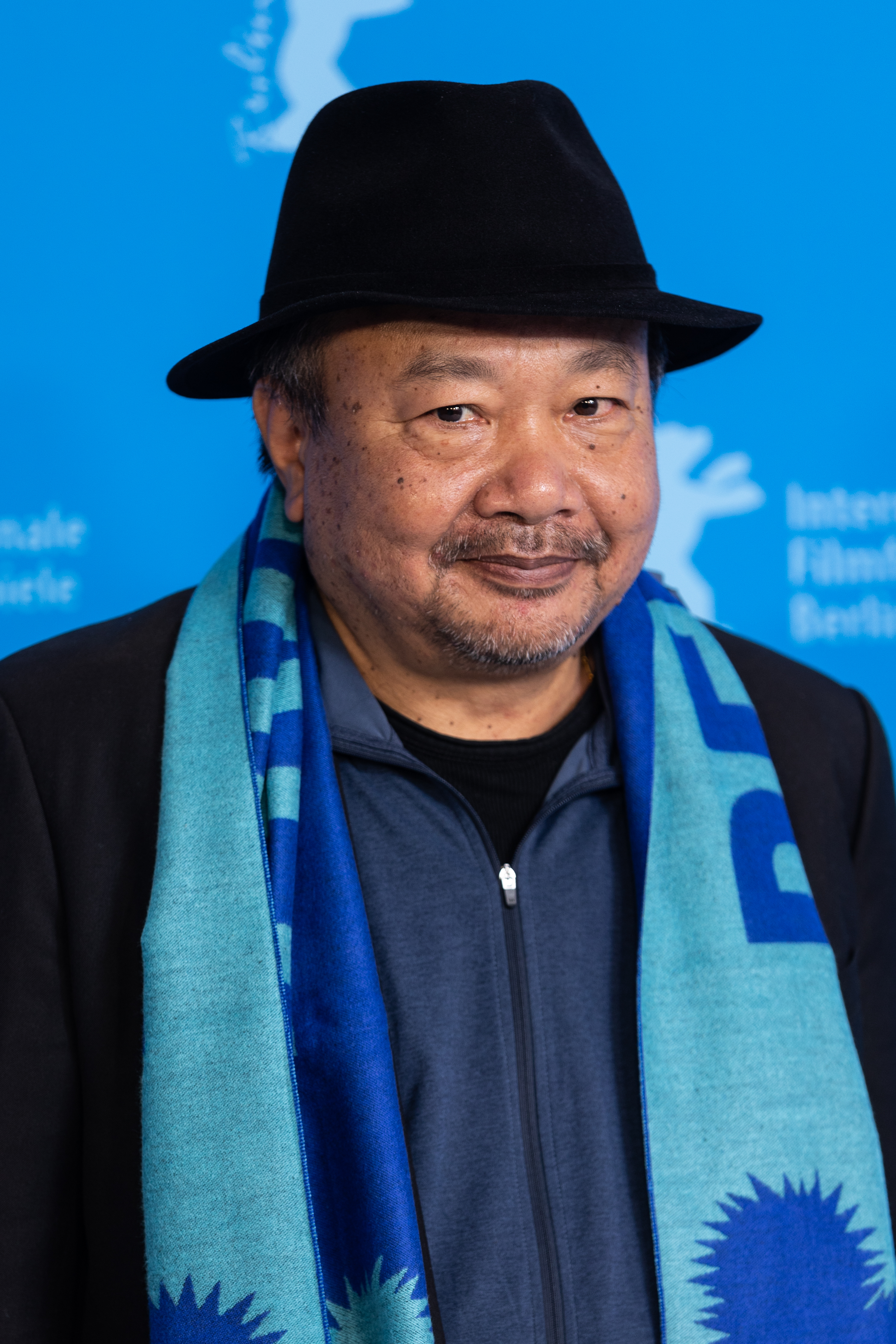
Rithy Panh, The director of the film

We Are the Fruits of the Forest is filmed over several years that explores the lives of the Bunong people, an indigenous ethnic group in Cambodia. They live primarily in mountainous region of Mondulkiri and Ratanakiri in Cambodia. The film highlights their deep connection to ancestral traditions and the natural environment, which is increasingly at risk due to climate change and large-scale land development by global companies. The director uses archival footage from different time periods to trace changes in their way of life and to depict their present-day reality. The documentary also raises broader questions about how modern societies relate to nature.

== Cast ==
- Pa Kreb
- Mak Kreb
- Yeay Kreb

== Release ==
We Are the Fruits of the Forest had its world premiere at the 38th Tokyo International Film Festival on 30 October 2025 in International competition.

It screened in the Forum section of 76th Berlin International Film Festival for its European premiere on 14 February 2026.

== Accolades ==
Award	Date of ceremony	Category	Recipient	Result	Ref.
Tokyo International Film Festival	November 5, 2025	Tokyo Grand Prix	We Are the Fruits of the Forest	Nominated	
Tokyo International Film Festival	November 5, 2025	Special Jury Prize	Rithy Panh	Won	
