= Mothertongue (film) =

2025 Chinese drama film

- Promotional poster
- Simplified Chinese: 春树
- Hanyu Pinyin: Chūn Shù
- Directed by: Zhang Lü
- Screenplay by: Zhang Lü; Liu Shuyi
- Produced by: Peng Jin; Huang Jianxin
- Starring: Bai Baihe; Wang Chuanjun; Liu Dan
- Cinematography: Piao Songri
- Edited by: Liu Xinzhu
- Production company: Chengdu Lu Films Co. Ltd.
- Release date: 29 October 2025 (Tokyo)
- Running time: 122 minutes
- Country: China
- Language: Mandarin

Mothertongue (Chinese: 春树) is a 2025 Chinese drama film written and directed by Korean-Chinese filmmaker Zhang Lü and stars Bai Baihe, Wang Chuanjun and Liu Dan. The film follows a struggling actress Chunshu, who returns to her hometown in Sichuan. Confused by the fact that she can no longer speak her native dialect, she searches for a new life.

The film had its World Premiere at the 38th Tokyo International Film Festival on October 29, 2025 in International competition vying for Tokyo Grand Prix.

== Premise ==
After living in Beijing for ten years, Chunshu comes back to her hometown, Chengdu, but she feels confused and disconnected, She felt deeply distant from both her mother and the city. A newcomer named Dongdong unexpectedly enters her life and slowly helps her reconnect with the city by exploring old memories and making new discoveries.

== Cast ==
- Bai Baihe as Chunshu
- Liu Dan as Zhang Mei
- Wang Chuanjun as Wang Dongdong
- Peng Jin as Fang Lijuan
- Liu Shuyi as Xiaofen

Special appearance

- Huang Jiansis
- Le Jiskam
- Leilan Connie Loung Han
- Wang Hongwei
- Huang Yan
- Nie Chuvi

== Release ==
Mothertongue had its world premiere at the 38th Tokyo International Film Festival on October 29, 2025 in International competition.

== Accolades ==
| Award | Date of ceremony | Category | Recipient | Result | Ref. |
|---|---|---|---|---|---|
| Tokyo International Film Festival | November 5, 2025 | Tokyo Grand Prix | Mothertongue | Nominated | |
| Tokyo International Film Festival | November 5, 2025 | Best Director | Zhang Lü | Won | |
| Tokyo International Film Festival | November 5, 2025 | Best Actor | Wang Chuanjun | Won | |
