= Ellen Y.D. Kim =

South Korean film producer and businesswoman

- 김영덕
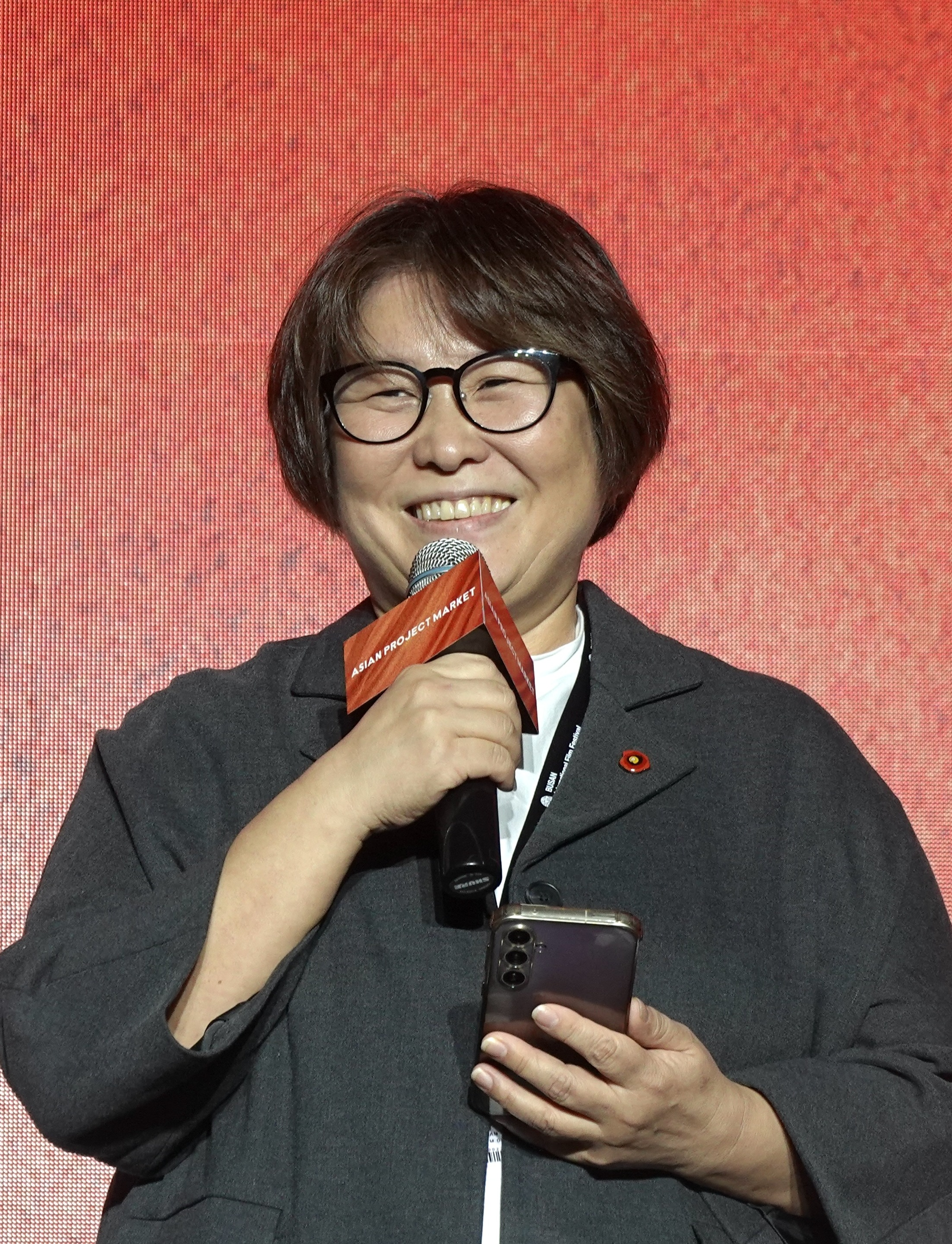
- Ellen Y.D. Kim at the 2025 Busan International Film Festival
- Occupation: Market director of Asian Contents & Film Market (ACFM)
- Years active: 1990s - current

Ellen Y.D. Kim (Korean: 김영덕) is the market director of the Asian Contents & Film Market (ACFM), the industry platform of the Busan International Film Festival (BIFF). Kim was appointed in March 2024 to succeed Oh Seok Geun, who departed in 2023 as part of upheaval in upper festival management. It was the first open search for the position.

== Career ==
Kim worked at BIFF in the 1990s as a manager in various capacities, including program team manager and planning and budget team manager. She had been among those that helped establish ACFM in 2006.

Before being appointed to be market director of ACFM, Kim had been program director of the Bucheon International Fantastic Film Festival for eight years.

In addition, Kim is an indie film producer, having co-produced features including the 2002 film Cry Woman; the 2008 film Night And Day, the 2011 film Hanaan, and 2020 film Sewing Sisters.

In 2025, Kim introduced a number of new programs, including Doc Square, a program for documentary industry; InnoAsia, a track exploring the role of AI and other technologies in content creation; and "The A" an industry report and summit about entertainment trends in Asia.
