= Asian Contents & Film Market =

Movie industry trade show in Asia

- 2026 official poster
- Formation: 2005
- Type: Film market
- Location: Busan, South Korea
- Parent organization: Busan International Film Festival
- Website: ACFM

The Asian Contents & Film Market (ACFM) is an entertainment trade show that runs alongside the Busan International Film Festival. It brings together creators, investors, and buyers large from across Asia, but also from other regions of the world. It is comparable to the Marché du Film in the Cannes Film Festival, with a focus on Asia.

It was previously known as the Asian Film Market, and is currently headed by Ellen Y.D. Kim.

== Format ==
The festival generally pulls together around 2,700 industry professionals for combination of sales market, exhibition booths, panels and networking session. Among the standard components of the market are:

- Busan Story Market (BSM), a market showcasing original IP from Asian publishers
- the Asian Project Market (APM)
- Asian Cinema Fund (ACF), a funding initiative
- Producer Hub, a networking program, launched in 2024
- Platform Busan, panels for emerging film makers

Starting with the 2025 edition ACFM added

- Doc Square, a program for documentary industry
- InnoAsia, a track exploring the role of AI and other technologies in content creation
- "The A" an industry report and summit about entertainment trends in Asia.

== History ==
The market was first announced at a launch party during the Berlinale in February 2006, which the first market taking place eight months later in the Grand Hotel in Busan. The first market hosted 554 companies from 35 countries and 1,160 registered participants. The second iteration took place at the Grand Hotel before moving to Seacloud Hotel by Haeundae Beach for three years. As of 2011, it moved to the Busan Exhibition and Convention Center (Bexco).

=== 2026 ===
The 21st edition of the film market will run from October 10 to 13 at the Exhibition Center 2, of the Busan Exhibition and Convention Center, Busan. Japan is selected as the "Country of the Year – Producer Hub", as such ten Japanese producers will visit the market to introduce their country's projects and explore cooperation from producers of the various nations.

On July 30, the Asian Project Market selected 30 projects representing 20 countries.

On August 4, the Busan Story Market revealed 25 official selections for 2026.

On August 20, ACFM launched the Country of Honour program in 2026 with Thailand joining as the inaugural Country of Honour.
