= Carlo Chatrian =

Italian film critic and journalist (born 1971)

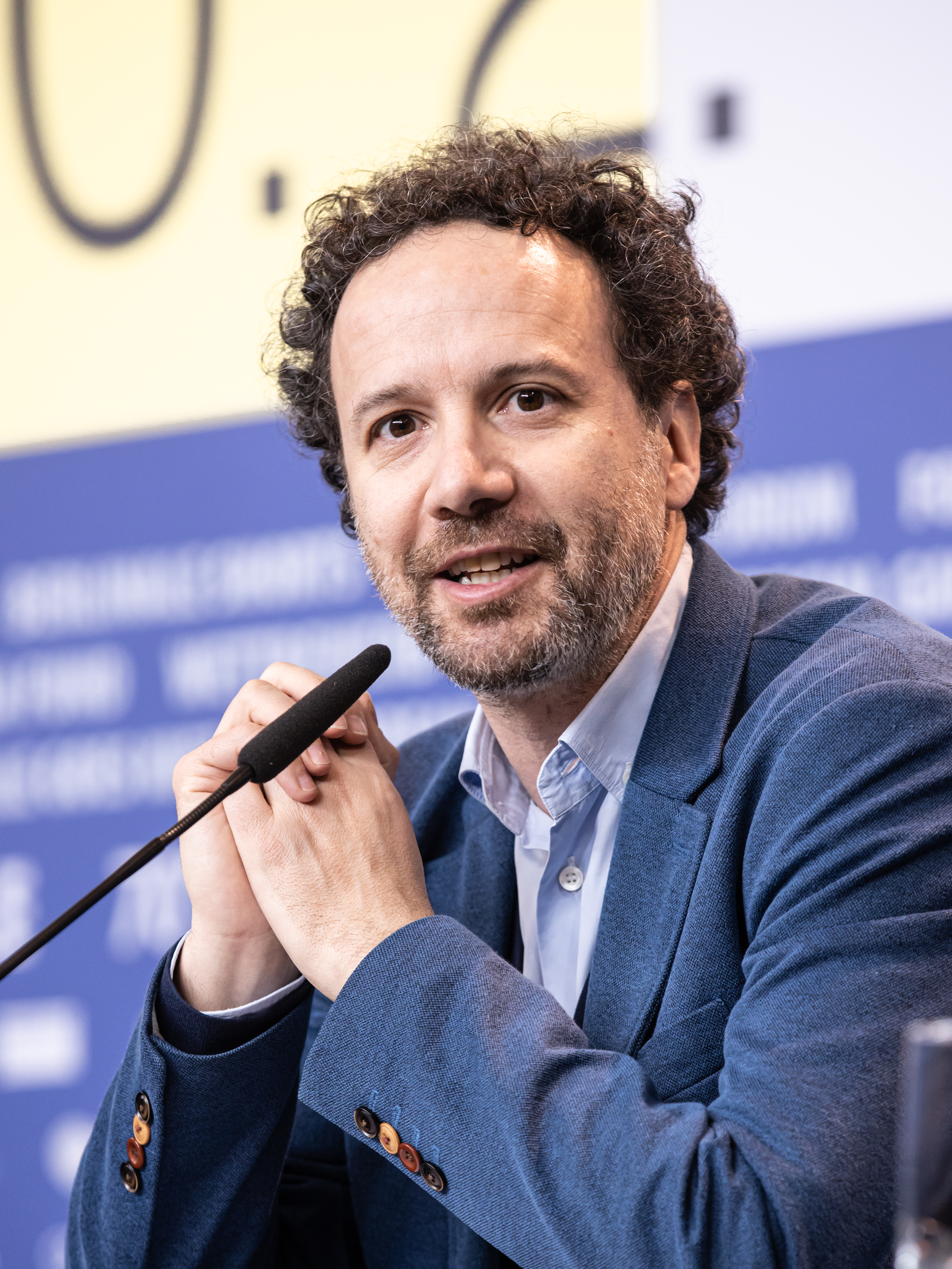
- Chatrian in 2020
- Born: 9 December 1971 (age 54); Turin, Italy
- Occupations: Journalist, author, film programmer

Carlo Chatrian (French: [karlo ʃatʁijɑ̃]; born 9 December 1971) is a journalist, cinema critic and artistic director.

Chatrian directed the Festival del film Locarno from 2013 to 2018 and the Berlin International Film Festival from 2020 to 2024. He left the Berlinale noting how the changes brought to the festival by the Culture Ministry would not grant him sufficient programming freedom.

Since 2024, he has been the director of the National Cinema Museum in Turin.

== Early life and education ==
Originally from Torgnon, Chatrian graduated in Literature and Philosophy from Turin University in 1994.

== Career ==
As a film critic he works regularly for the magazines Filmcritica, Duellanti, Cineforum and is director of Panoramiques.

As a programmer and curator Chatrian worked with various festivals and film institutions:

- Museo nazionale del Cinema, Turin (1994)
- Filmmaker Doc, Milan (1995–2005)
- Alba International Film Festival (Deputy Director 2001–2007)
- Courmayeur Noir Film Festival (Curator section Doc Noir 2002–2010)
- Locarno Film Festival (Artistic Director 2012–2018, Member of the selection committee 2006–2009, Curator retrospective since 2008)
- Festival dei Popoli, Florence (Member of the selection committee since 2008, Head of selection since 2011)
- Cinéma du réel, Paris (2010)
- Swiss Film Archive, Lausanne (Advisor since 2010)
- Visions du Réel, Nyon (Programmer since 2011)
- Foundation Film Commission Vallée d'Aoste (Director from 2011 until 2017.)

On September 4, 2012, Chatrian was nominated artistic director at the Festival del film Locarno.

In June 2018, Chatrian was named as the new artistic director of the Berlin International Film Festival (Berlinale), to assume this position in 2020 in collaboration with Mariette Rissenbeek as executive director. In September 2023, he announced that he would step down from his role at the Berlinale after the 2024 edition. Chatrian motivated his decision saying that the new management structure of the festival, pushed for by the German Federal Culture Ministry, would not grant him sufficient freedom to shape the program.

On September 18, 2024, Chatrian was appointed as the new director of the National Cinema Museum in Turin, for a five-year mandate.

== Bibliography ==
Chatrian has published numerous monographs on filmmakers such as Wong Kar Wai, Johan van der Keuken, Frederick Wiseman, Errol Morris, Maurizio Nichetti and Nanni Moretti; he wrote several essays for magazines and film publications.

Selection of publications:

- Alovisio, Silvio / Chatrian, Carlo (1997): Le ceneri del tempo. Il cinema di Wong Kar Wai. TraccEdizioni, Piombino.
- Brianzoli, Giorgia / Chatrian, Carlo (1999): Il mulino delle immagini. GS Editrice, Santhia.
- Brianzoli, Giorgia / Chatrian, Carlo / Mosso, Luca (2000): Paesaggi umani. Filmmaker Editrice, Milano.
- Chatrian, Carlo / Mosso, Luca (2002): In prima persona. Il cinema di Errol Morris. Il castoro, Milano.
- Barisone, Luciano / Chatrian, Carlo / Nazzaro, Giona A. (2003): Io, un altro. Effata Edizioni, Cantalupa.
- Barisone, Luciano / Chatrian, Carlo (2003): Nicolas Philibert. Effata Edizioni, Cantalupa.
- Causo, Massimo / Chatrian, Carlo (2005): Maurizio Nichetti. Effata Edizioni, Cantalupa.
- Chatrian, Carlo / Renzi, Eugenio (2008): Nanni Moretti. Entretiens. Cahiers du Cinéma.
- Chatrian, Carlo / Persico, Daniela (2008): Claire Simon. Milano.
- Chatrian, Carlo / Paganelli, Grazia (2010): Manga Impact. Phaidon, London.
