= Tokyo International Film Festival =

Annual film festival held in Tokyo, Japan

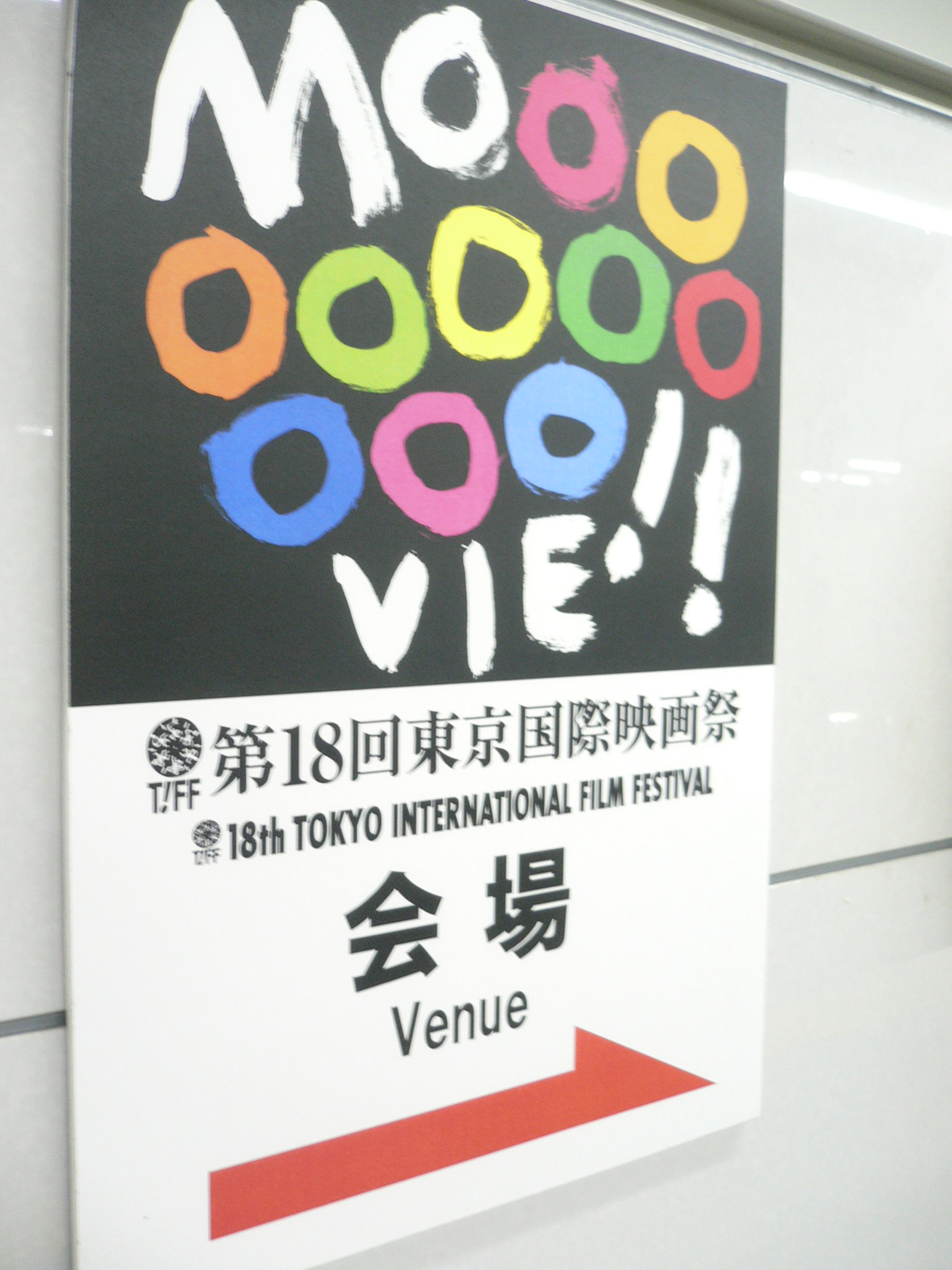
- Venue signage at Roppongi Station during the 18th TIFF in 2005
- Location: Tokyo, Japan
- Founded: 1985
- Most recent: 2025
- Language: International
- Website: www.tiff-jp.net

Current: 38th
- 39th 37th

The Tokyo International Film Festival (東京国際映画祭, Tōkyōkokusaieigasai; TIFF) is a film festival established in 1985. The event was held biennially from 1985 to 1991 and annually thereafter. According to the FIAPF, it is one of Asia's competitive film festivals and the second largest film festival in Asia behind the Shanghai International Film Festival, as well as the only Japanese festival accredited by the FIAPF.

The awards handed out during the festival have changed throughout its existence, but the Tokyo Grand Prix, handed to the best film, has stayed as the top award. Other awards that have been given regularly include the Special Jury Award and awards for best actor, best actress and best director.

In recent years, the festival's main events have been held over one week in late October, at the Roppongi Hills development. Events include open-air screenings, voice-over screenings, and appearances by actors, as well as seminars and symposiums related to the film market. Takeo Hisamatsu was appointed festival director effective April 14, 2026. He took over from Hiroyasu Ando, who served from 2019 till April 2026.

== List of festivals and award winners ==
Edition	Year	Jury president	Award winners				
Edition	Year	Jury president	Tokyo Grand Prix Director	Best Director Film	Best Actor Film	Best Actress Film	Special Jury Prize Director
1st	1985	David Puttnam	Typhoon Club; Shinji Sōmai	Péter Gothár; Time Stands Still	Not awarded		Jacques and November; François Bouvier and Jean Beaudry; Kiss of the Spider Woman; Héctor Babenco
2nd	1987	Gregory Peck	Old Well; Wu Tianming	Lana Gogoberidze; Turnover	Zhang Yimou; Old Well	Rachel Ward; The Good Wife	Housekeeping; Bill Forsyth
3rd	1989	Yves Montand	That Summer of White Roses; Rajko Grlić	Rajko Grlić; That Summer of White Roses	Marlon Brando; A Dry White Season	Elena Yakovleva; Intergirl	Intergirl; Pyotr Todorovsky
4th	1991	Lewis Gilbert	City of Hope; John Sayles	Alan Parker; The Commitments	Otar Megvinetukhutsesi; Get Thee Out	Zhao Lirong; The Spring Festival	A Brighter Summer Day; Edward Yang; The Spring Festival; Huang Jianchong
5th	1992	Richard D. Zanuck	White Badge; Chung Ji-young	Chung Ji-young; White Badge	Max Von Sydow; The Silent Touch	Lumi Cavazos; Like Water for Chocolate	About Love, Tokyo; Mitsuo Yanagimachi
6th	1993	Franco Zeffirelli	The Blue Kite; Tian Zhuangzhuang	Taylor Hackford; Blood In Blood Out	Masahiro Motoki; Last Song	Lü Liping; The Blue Kite; Lolita Davidovich; Younger and Younger	Searching for Bobby Fischer; Steven Zaillian
7th	1994	Mike Medavoy	The Day the Sun Turned Cold; Yim Ho	Yim Ho; The Day the Sun Turned Cold	Niu Zhenhua; Back to Back, Face to Face	Debra Winger; A Dangerous Woman	47 Ronin; Kon Ichikawa
8th	1995	Hugh Hudson	Not awarded	Joseph Novoa; Sicario	Not awarded	Yasuko Tomita; The Christ of Nanjing	The Man Who Read Music from Plates; Jan Jakub Kolski
9th	1996	Serge Silberman	Kolya; Jan Svěrák	Wu Tianming; The King of Masks	Zhu Xu; The King of Masks	Hildegun Riise and Marie Theisen; The Other Side of Sunday	In Full Gallop; Krzysztof Zanussi; Libertarias; Vicente Aranda
10th	1997	Saul Zaentz	The Perfect Circle; Ademir Kenović; Beyond Silence; Caroline Link	Ademir Kenović; The Perfect Circle	Koji Yakusho; Cure	Rene Liu and Jing Tseng; Murmur of Youth	Brassed Off; Mark Herman
11th	1998	Jeremy Thomas	Open Your Eyes; Alejandro Amenábar	Guy Ritchie; Lock, Stock and Two Smoking Barrels	Brad Renfro; Apt Pupil	Maki Miyamoto; The Geisha House	Leaf on a Pillow; Garin Nugroho
12th	1999	Karel Reisz	Darkness and Light; Chang Tso-chi	Martha Fiennes; Onegin	Carlos Alvarez-Novoa; Alone	María Galiana; Alone	Rainbow Trout; Park Jong-won
13th	2000	Volker Schlöndorff	Amores perros Alejandro González Iñárritu	Alejandro González Iñárritu; Amores perros	Moussa Maaskri; Mondialito	Jennifer Jason Leigh; The King is Alive	Virgin Stripped Bare by Her Bachelors; Hong Sang-soo
14th	2001	Norman Jewison	Slogans; Gjergj Xhuvani	Reza Mirkarimi; Under the Moonlight; Gjergj Xhuvani; Slogans	Andrew Howard; Mr In-Between	Luiza Xhuvani; Slogans	Under the Moonlight; Reza Mirkarimi
15th	2002	Luc Besson	Broken Wings; Nir Bergman	Carlo Rola; Sass	Graham Greene; Skins	Donatella Finocchiaro; Angela	Hotel Hibiscus; Yuji Nakae
16th	2003	Gong Li	Nuan; Huo Jianqi	Chris Valentien and Till Schauder; Santa Smokes	Teruyuki Kagawa; Nuan	Shinobu Terajima; Vibrator; Khristy Jean Hulslander; Santa Smokes	The Suit; Bakhtyar Khudojnazarov
17th	2004	Yoji Yamada	Whisky; Juan Pablo Rebella and Pablo Stoll	Im Chan-sang; The President's Barber	Olzhas Nusuppaev; Schizo	Mirella Pascual; Whisky	Kekexili: Mountain Patrol; Lu Chuan
18th	2005	Zhang Yimou	What the Snow Brings; Kichitaro Negishi	Kichitaro Negishi; What the Snow Brings	Kōichi Satō; What the Snow Brings	Helena Bonham Carter; Conversations with Other Women; Jin Yaqin; You and Me	Conversations with Other Women; Hans Canosa
19th	2006	Jean-Pierre Jeunet	OSS 117: Cairo, Nest of Spies; Michel Hazanavicius	Jonathan Dayton and Valerie Faris; Little Miss Sunshine	Roy Dupuis; The Rocket	Abigail Breslin; Little Miss Sunshine	Thirteen Princess Trees; Lü Yue
20th	2007	Alan Ladd Jr.	The Band's Visit; Eran Kolirin	Peter Howitt; Dangerous Parking	Damian Ul; Tricks	Shefali Shah; Gandhi, My Father	The Western Trunk Line; Li Ji-xian
21st	2008	Jon Voight	Tyulpan; Sergey Dvortsevoy	Sergey Dvortsevoy; Tyulpan	Vincent Cassel; Mesrine	Félicité Wouassi; With a Little Help from Myself	Four Nights with Anna; Jerzy Skolimowski
22nd	2009	Alejandro González Iñárritu	Eastern Plays; Kamen Kalev	Kamen Kalev; Eastern Plays	Christo Christov; Eastern Plays	Julie Gayet; Eight Times Up	Rabia; Sebastián Cordero
23rd	2010	Neil Jordan	Intimate Grammar; Nir Bergman	Gilles Paquet-Brenner; Sarah's Key	Wang Qianyuan; The Piano in a Factory	Fan Bingbing; Buddha Mountain	Postcard; Kaneto Shindo
24th	2011	Edward R. Pressman	The Intouchables; Éric Toledano and Olivier Nakache	Ruben Östlund; Play	François Cluzet; The Intouchables	Glenn Close; Albert Nobbs	The Woodsman and the Rain; Shuichi Okita
25th	2012	Roger Corman	The Other Son; Lorraine Lévy	Lorraine Lévy; The Other Son	Seo Young-joo; Juvenile Offender	Neslihan Atagül; Araf	Juvenile Offender; Kang Yi-kwan
26th	2013	Chen Kaige	We Are the Best! Lukas Moodysson	Benedikt Erlingsson; Of Horses and Men	Wang Jingchun; To Live and Die in Ordos	Eugene Domingo; Barber's Tales	Bending the Rules; Behnam Behzadi
27th	2014	James Gunn	Heaven Knows What; Joshua Safdie and Ben Safdie	Joshua Safdie and Ben Safdie; Heaven Knows What	Robert Więckiewicz; The Mighty Angel	Rie Miyazawa; Pale Moon	The Lesson; Kristina Grozeva and Petar Valchanov
28th	2015	Bryan Singer	Nise: The Heart of Madness; Roberto Berliner	Mustafa Kara; Cold of Kalandar	Roland Møller and Louis Hofmann; Land of Mine	Glória Pires; Nise: The Heart of Madness	All Three of Us; Kheiron
29th	2016	Jean-Jacques Beineix	The Bloom of Yesterday; Chris Kraus	Hana Jušić; Quit Staring at My Plate	Paolo Ballesteros; Die Beautiful	Lene Cecilia Sparrok; Sami Blood	Sami Blood; Amanda Kernell
30th	2017	Tommy Lee Jones	Grain; Semih Kaplanoğlu	Edmund Yeo; Aqérat (We, The Dead)	Duan Yihong; The Looming Storm	Adeline D'Hermy; Maryline	Crater; Silvia Luzi and Luca Bellino
31st	2018	Brillante Mendoza	Amanda; Mikhaël Hers	Edoardo De Angelis; The Vice of Hope	Jesper Christensen; Before the Frost	Pina Turco; The Vice of Hope	Before the Frost; Michael Noer
32nd	2019	Zhang Ziyi	Uncle; Frelle Petersen	Saeed Roustayi; Just 6.5	Navid Mohammadzadeh; Just 6.5	Nadia Tereszkiewicz; Only the Animals	Atlantis; Valentyn Vasyanovych
33rd	2020	No competition due to the COVID-19 pandemic.					
34th	2021	Isabelle Huppert	Vera Dreams of the Sea; Kaltrina Krasniqi	Darezhan Omirbaev; Poet	Amir Aghaei, Fatih Al, Bariş Yildiz, and Onur Buldu; The Four Walls	Julia Chávez; The Other Tom	La civil Teodora Mihai
35th	2022	Julie Taymor	The Beasts; Rodrigo Sorogoyen	Rodrigo Sorogoyen; The Beasts	Denis Ménochet; The Beasts	Aline Küppenheim; 1976	World War III; Houman Seyyedi
36th	2023	Wim Wenders	Snow Leopard; Pema Tseden	Kishi Yoshiyuki (Ab)normal Desire	Yasna Mirtahmasb; Roxana	Zar Amir Ebrahimi; Tatami	Tatami; Guy Nattiv, Zar Amir Ebrahimi
37th	2024	Tony Leung	Teki Cometh; Daihachi Yoshida	Daihachi Yoshida; Teki Cometh	Kyōzō Nagatsuka; Teki Cometh	Anamaria Vartolomei; Traffic	Adios Amigo; Iván David Gaona
38th	2025	Carlo Chatrian	Palestine 36; Annemarie Jacir	Zhang Lü/Alessio Rigo de Righi, Matteo Zoppis; Mothertongue/Heads or Tails?	Wang Chuanjun; Mothertongue	Momoko Fukuchi and Naomi Kawase; Echoes of Motherhood	We Are the Fruits of the Forest; Rithy Panh
39th	2026	Rolf de Heer	Sister Brother Manhole Cover	Lisandro Alonso for Double Freedom	Ryo Narita for Two Cigarettes, Three Nights	Hu Ling for The Night That Binds Us	Magic Atlas by Sun Xun

== Other awards ==
=== Best Screenplay Award ===
- 2017 - Euthanizer, Teemu Nikki
- 2018 - Amanda, Mikhael Hers and Maud Ameline
- 2019 - A Beloved Wife, Shin Adachi

=== Best Artistic Contribution Award ===
- 2012 - Pankaj Kumar, Ship of Theseus
- 2014 - Ispytanie, Aleksandr Kott
- 2015 - Family Film, Olmo Omerzu
- 2017 - The Looming Storm
- 2018 - The White Crow
- 2019 - Chaogtu with Sarula
- 2021 - Crane Lantern
- 2022 - Peacock Lament, Sanjeewa Pushpakumara
- 2024 - My Friend An Delie, Dong Zijian
- 2025 - Mother by Teona Strugar Mitevska
- 2026 - Until the Day Ends by Jelena Maksimović

=== Audience Award ===
- 2013 - Red Family, Lee Ju-hyoung
- 2014 - Pale Moon, Daihachi Yoshida
- 2015 - God Willing, Edoardo Falcone
- 2016 - Die Beautiful, Jun Lana
- 2017 - Tremble All You Want, Akiko Ooku
- 2018 - Another World, Junji Sakamoto
- 2019 - Only the Animals, Dominik Moll
- 2020 - Hold Me Back, Akiko Ooku (sole award given)
- 2021 - Just Remembering, Daigo Matsui
- 2022 - By the Window, Rikiya Imaizumi
- 2024 - Big World, Yang Lina
- 2025 - Blonde by Sakashita Yuichiro
- 2026 - Heysel 85 by Teodora Ana Mihai

=== Asian Future Best Film Award ===
- 2014 - Bedone marz بدون مرز, Amirhossein Asgari امیرحسین عسگری
- 2015 - Pimpaka Towira, The Island Funeral
- 2016 - Birdshot
- 2017 - Passage of Life
- 2018 - A First Farewell
- 2019 - Summer Knight
- 2021 - World, Northern Hemisphere
- 2022 - Butterflies Live Only One Day, Mohammadreza Vatandoust
- 2024 - Apollon by Day Athena by Night, Emine Yildirim
- 2025 - Halo by Roh Young-wan
- 2026 - Serife Tavsan by Tareq Daoud

=== Japanese Cinema Splash Best Picture Award ===
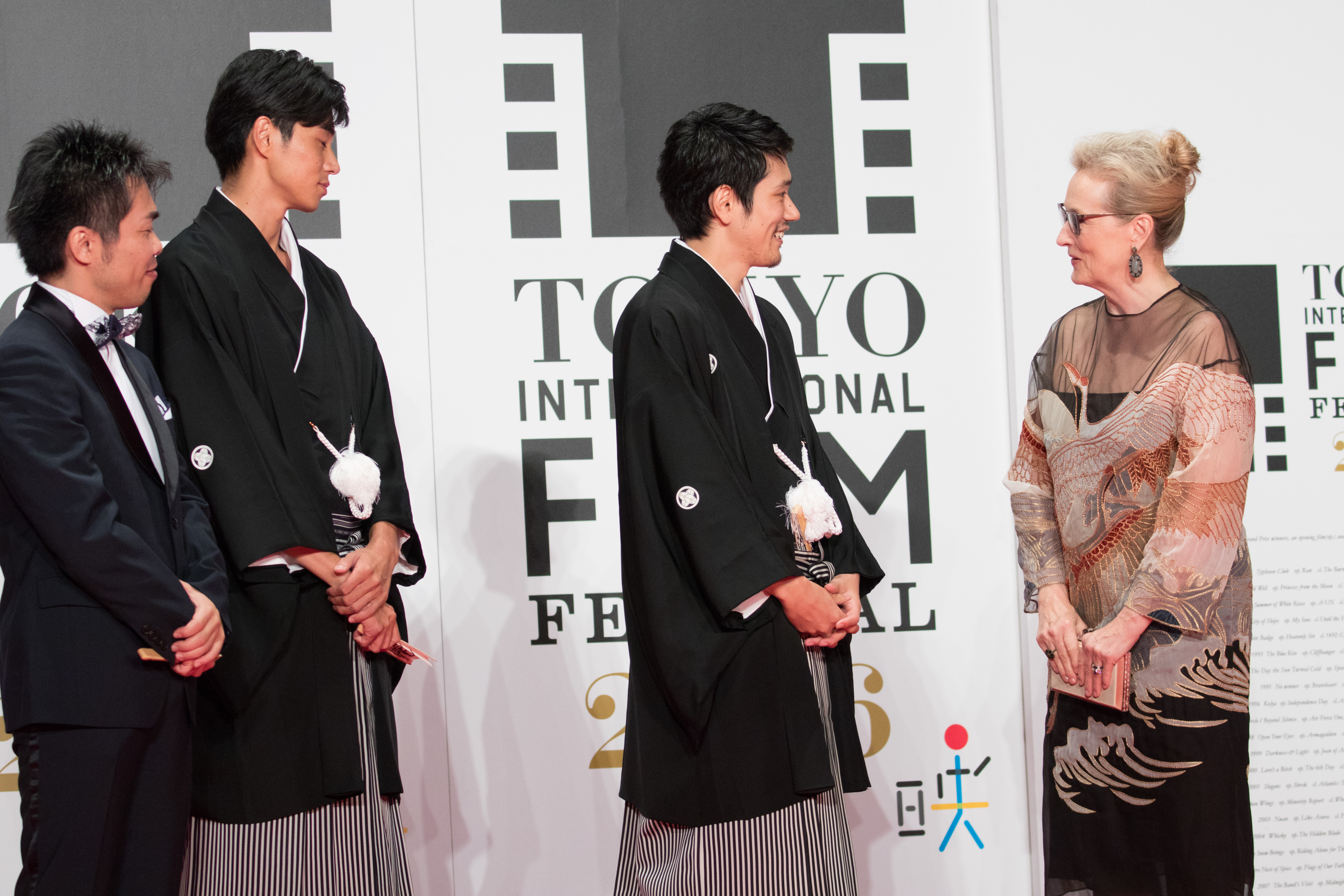
Meryl Streep at opening ceremony in 2016

- 2014 - 100 Yen Love, Masaharu Take
- 2015 - Ken and Kazu, Hiroshi Shoji
- 2017 - Of Love & Law, Hikaru Toda
- 2016 - Poolsideman, Hirobumi Watanabe
- 2018 - Lying to Mom, Katsumi Nojiri
- 2019 - i -Documentary of the Journalist-, Tatsuya Mori

=== Tokyo Gemstone Award ===
- 2017 - Mayu Matsuoka, Shizuka Ishibashi, Adeline D'Hermy, Daphne Low
- 2018 - Liên Bỉnh Phát, Karelle Tremblay, Mai Kiryu, Nijiro Murakami
- 2019 - Josefine Frida Pettersen, Sairi Ito, Riru Yoshina, Yui Sakuma

== Kashiko Kawakita Award ==
"Kashiko Kawakita Award" a new award is established by the Kawakita Memorial Film Institute to honour women advancing film culture in Japan and internationally. The award that takes its name from Kashiko Kawakita, known as "Madame Kawakita", will be presented starting with the 2026 edition of the festival. Hata Sahoko, film critic is the first recipient of the award.

- Hata Sahoko, film critic (2026)
